= Pure economic loss in English law =

Recovery for pure economic loss in English law, arising from negligence, has traditionally been limited. Notably, recovery for losses that are "purely economic" arise under the Fatal Accidents Act 1976; and for negligent misstatements, as stated in Hedley Byrne v. Heller. Economic loss generally refers to financial detriment that can be seen on a balance sheet but not physically. Economic loss is then divided into "consequential economic loss" - that which arises directly from some physical damage or injury (e.g. loss of earnings from having your arm cut off) and "pure economic loss", which is everything else.

The fear behind allowing claims for "pure economic loss" is that potentially unlimited claims could flood in. The risks may be unknowable, and parties would find it impossible to insure. The U.S. judge Benjamin N. Cardozo famously described it as, "liability in an indeterminate amount, for an indeterminate time, to an indeterminate class".

Examples of pure economic loss include:

- Loss of income suffered by a family whose principal earner dies in an accident. The physical injury is caused to the deceased, not the family.
- Loss of market value of a property owing to the inadequate specifications of foundations by an architect.
- Loss of production suffered by an enterprise whose electricity supply is interrupted by a contractor excavating a public utility.

The latter case is exemplified by the case of Spartan Steel and Alloys Ltd v. Martin & Co. Ltd. Similar losses are also restricted in German law though not in French law.

== Complex structure theory ==
The complex structure theory is an argument which has been put forward in pure economic loss cases which suggests that a large chattel may be considered to consist of several parts and so damage to other "property" for the purpose of applying Donoghue v Stevenson principles. This theory as a normative doctrine has been rejected by Lord Bridge in Murphy v Brentwood.

== Key cases ==
- Donoghue v Stevenson
- Anns v Merton London Borough Council
- Caparo Industries plc v Dickman
- Murphy v Brentwood District Council
- Hedley Byrne & Co Ltd v Heller & Partners Ltd
- Smith v Eric S Bush
- White v Jones
- Henderson v Merrett Syndicates Ltd
- Spartan Steel & Alloys Ltd v Martin & Co (Contractors) Ltd
- Junior Books v Veitchi
- D & F Estates Ltd v Church Commissioners for England
- Deloitte & Touche v Livent Inc (Receiver of) (Canadian case)

== Bibliography ==
- Bishop, W. (1982). "Economic loss in tort". Oxford Journal of Legal Studies. 2: 1–29. doi:10.1093/ojls/2.1.1.
- Giliker, P. (2005). "Revisiting pure economic loss: lessons to be learnt from the Supreme Court of Canada?". Legal Studies. 25: 49–71. doi:10.1111/j.1748-121X.2005.tb00270.x. S2CID 144517741.
- Lunney, M. & Oliphant, K. (2003). Tort Law: Text and Materials (2nd ed.). Oxford: Oxford University Press. pp. pp 339–423. ISBN 978-0-19-926055-3.
- Stapleton, J. (1991). "Duty of care and economic loss: a wider agenda". Law Quarterly Review. 107: 249.
- Stapleton, J. (2002). "Pure economic loss: lessons from case-law-focused 'middle theory'". UCLA Law Review. 50: 531.
- van Gerven, Walter; Lever, Jeremy; Larouche, Pierre, eds. (2001). Cases, Materials and Text on National, Supranational and International Tort Law. Oxford: Hart Publishing. ISBN 978-1841131399.
- Weinrib, E. J. (2005) "The disintegration of duty", in Madden, M. S. Exploring Tort Law, London: Cambridge University Press, pp143-272 ISBN 0-521-85136-X
- Lunney, M. & Oliphant, K. (2003). Tort Law: Text and Materials (2nd ed.). Oxford: Oxford University Press. pp. pp 339–423. ISBN 978-0-19-926055-3.
