= Deloitte & Touche v Livent Inc (Receiver of) =

- Supreme Court of Canada

Hearing: 15 February 2017 Judgment: 20 December 2017
- Full case name: Deloitte & Touche v Livent Inc, Through its Special Receiver and Manager Roman Doroniuk
- Citations: 2017 SCC 63
- Docket No.: 36875
- Prior history: APPEAL from Livent Inc v Deloitte & Touche, 2016 ONCA 11 (8 January 2016), affirming Livent Inc v Deloitte & Touche LLP, 2014 ONSC 2176 (4 April 2014). Leave to appeal granted, Deloitte & Touche v. Livent Inc., Through its Special Receiver and Manager Roman Doroniuk, 2016 CanLII 33999 (9 June 2016)
- Ruling: Appeal allowed in part, McLachlin CJ and Wagner and Côté JJ dissenting in part

Holding
- Anns v Merton LBC and Cooper v Hobart apply in cases of pure economic loss arising from an auditor’s negligent misrepresentation or performance of a service. A two-stage analysis must be undertaken to determine whether a prima facie duty of care exists between the parties, and if so, whether there are any residual policy considerations that may negate the imposition of such a duty.

Court membership
- Chief Justice: Beverley McLachlin; Puisne Justices: Rosalie Abella, Michael Moldaver, Andromache Karakatsanis, Richard Wagner, Clément Gascon, Suzanne Côté, Russell Brown, Malcolm Rowe

Reasons given
- Majority: Gascon and Brown JJ, joined by Karakatsanis and Rowe JJ
- Concur/dissent: McLaughlin CJ, joined by Wagner and Côté JJ
- Abella and Moldaver JJ took no part in the consideration or decision of the case.

Deloitte & Touche v Livent Inc (Receiver of), 2017 SCC 63 is a leading case of the Supreme Court of Canada concerning the duty of care that auditors have toward their clients during the course of a professional engagement.

== Background ==
In 1998, Livent's financial statements for the 1996 and 1997 fiscal years were restated, resulting in a significant downward adjustment of reported income, and its share value fell from USD $6.75 to $0.28 per share. This resulted in numerous criminal, civil, regulatory and disciplinary proceedings in both Canada and the US. (Note: Disciplinary proceedings were undertaken against four of Deloitte's partners, of whom three were found guilty of the charges laid.)

After Livent sought bankruptcy protection under the Companies' Creditors Arrangement Act in November 1998, it was subsequently placed into receivership in September 1999, with Ernst & Young being appointed as receiver and manager. In November 2001, a special receiver was appointed by the court with respect to any potential legal action against Deloitte, Livent's former auditor, and such action was commenced in February 2002, alleging that "Deloitte owed a duty to ensure that Livent’s financial statements were reported in accordance with its own accounting policies and generally accepted accounting principles," which, if followed, would have revealed the extent of fraudulent activity that had been occurring within the company. It was further alleged that "[i]ts alleged negligent issuance of unqualified opinions, in turn, deprived the honest directors and shareholders of the opportunity to put a stop to the fraud, and the losses eventually caused to the company by the fraud, at an earlier date."

== The courts below ==
=== At trial ===
At the Ontario Superior Court of Justice, Deloitte was held to have been negligent, and Gans J awarded damages totalling $84,750,000 to Livent. In so doing, he observed that the standard of care is based on the profession's generally accepted auditing standards, and that the current state of Canadian jurisprudence concerning an auditor's duty can be expressed as follows:

- "he must come to it with an inquiring mind ... suspecting that someone may have made a mistake somewhere and that a check must be made to ensure that there has been none." (Note: Fomento (Sterling Area) Ltd v Selsdon Fountain Pen Co Ltd, [1958] 1 All ER 11, at 23)
- "it might be said that the modern procedures call for more sophistication and higher standards on the part of those who perform the work [and] it would seem that due skill and care calls for a more searching and critical approach today on matters of stock and provision for bad and doubtful debts than it did fifty years ago, and to some extent even ten years ago." (Note: Pacific Acceptance Corporation v Forsyth, (1970) 92 WN (NSW) 92, at 74)
- "where an auditor who is following or attempting to follow GAAS has an opportunity to acquire or is exposed to knowledge or information which might affect his opinion but he fails to recognize and act on that information ... [s]uch an omission cannot, in my view, always be excused even if the auditor is following GAAS." (Note: Revelstoke Credit Union v Miller, [1984] 2 WWR 297, at 303-304)

In that regard, liability was assessed as follows:

- On a balance of probabilities, any breach of the standard of care in audits prior to 1996 did not cause any damage to Livent;
- The 1996 audit procedures did not conform to GAAS, but the negligence did not cause any compensable harm;
- Issues arising in the 1997 audit, together with issues arising from additional work related to assurance for a press release and comfort letter relating to financing efforts in mid-year, were so significant that Deloitte should have resigned as auditor and reported their findings to Livent's audit committee as well as to the securities regulators, or, alternatively, they should have refused to issue an auditor's report for that year;
- The doctrines of corporate identification (Note: originally identified in Lennard's Carrying Co Ltd v Asiatic Petroleum Co Ltd, [1915] AC 705 (8 March 1915), adopted by the SCC in Canadian Dredge & Dock Co v The Queen, 1985 CanLII 32, [1985] 1 SCR 662 (23 May 1985)) and ex turpi causa non oritur actio (Note: recently examined in Moore Stephens v Stone Rolls Ltd (in liq) [2009] UKHL 30, [2009] 1 AC 1391 (30 July 2009)) were not available as a defence by Deloitte
- Deloitte's negligence was the proximate cause of the damages in question, in line with recent English jurisprudence (Note: within the bounds discussed in Galoo Ltd & Ors v Bright Grahame Murray (a firm) [1993] EWCA Civ 3, [1995] 1 All ER 16 (21 December 1993) and Sasea Finance Ltd (in liquidation) v KPMG (formerly KPMG Peat Marwick McLintock) [2000] 1 All ER 676)
- Contributory negligence was not available for reducing any damages in question
- Deepening insolvency, while much discussed in academic literature, did not assist in reducing damages

=== On appeal ===
Both parties appealed to the Court of Appeal for Ontario. Deloitte appealed with respect to the issues of corporate identification, ex turpi causa and proximate liability, while Livent's cross-appeal submitted that the trial judge erred in failing to hold Deloitte liable for negligence in respect of the 1996 audit and also in reducing the award of damages by 25 per cent.

The appeal and cross-appeal were both dismissed. In a 3-0 ruling, Blair JA held that:

- even if the factors identified in Canadian Dredge (Note: with respect to the actions taken by the directing mind of a corporation) are satisfied, enquiries must be made by the Court as to whether applying attribution for the purposes of ex turpi causa is consistent with the contract or relationship between the plaintiff and the defendant, and whether doing so is necessary to preserve the integrity of the justice system;
- the trial judge did not err in determining that the cause of action belonged to Livent, and no question of indeterminate liability arose;
- while auditors have a general duty to ensure that financial statements present "a fair and accurate picture" and to provide shareholders with the information necessary to help them in their oversight of management, auditors of publicly-traded corporations are also obliged to ensure that their reports help "to foster fair and efficient capital markets by protecting investors from unfair, improper or fraudulent practices, and to maintain public confidence in those markets."
- Deloitte was only responsible for those losses that were reasonably foreseeable as a result of its negligence
- the trial judge did not err in determining Deloitte's causation of negligence, nor was his approach in error in assessing the quantum of damages or as to not apply the doctrine of contributory negligence
- as to the cross-appeal, while auditors may be exposed to liability in the absence of fraud, the trial judge did not err in his approach

== At the Supreme Court of Canada ==
In a 4-3 ruling, the appeal was allowed in part, and Livent was awarded for costs throughout. For the majority, Gascon and Brown JJ held that the framework established in Anns v Merton LBC (Note: Anns v Merton London Borough Council [1977] UKHL 4, [1978] AC 728 (12 May 1977)) and Cooper v Hobart (Note: Cooper v Hobart, 2001 SCC 79, [2001] 3 SCR 537 (16 November 2001)) served to identify whether a duty of care existed, and that the Court's previous decision in Hercules Managements Ltd (Note: Hercules Managements Ltd v Ernst & Young, 1997 CanLII 345, [1997] 2 SCR 165 (22 May 1997), which adopted Caparo Industries plc v Dickman [1990] UKHL 2, [1990] 2 AC 605 (8 February 1990) into Canadian jurisprudence) had already established where liability may exist in the context of a statutory audit. Accordingly, Deloitte was liable for negligence only with respect to Livent's 1997 audit, and damages were reduced from $84,750,000 to $40,425,000. A several-stage analysis is required in order to properly determine whether liability arises:

- While Hercules stands for the general proposition that an auditor may owe its client a duty of care in relation to a particular undertaking, it is the Anns/Cooper framework that identifies a principled basis for imposing liability.
- In Stage 1, foreseeability alone is not enough to establish a prima facie duty of care - it is also necessary to establish proximity; therefore, in the prima facie duty of care analysis:

- proximity entails asking whether the parties are in such a "close and direct" relationship that it would be "just and fair having regard to that relationship to impose a duty of care in law"
- reasonable foreseeability entails asking whether an injury to the plaintiff was a reasonably foreseeable consequence of the defendant’s negligence

- In Stage 2, where a prima facie duty of care is recognized on the basis of proximity and reasonable foreseeability, the question then becomes whether there are "residual policy considerations" outside the relationship of the parties that may negate the imposition of a duty of care

- In that regard, indeterminate liability is liability of a specific character, not of a specific amount, and it is only a residual policy consideration

Applied to the case at hand, Deloitte’s undertakings in relation to soliciting investment, and the 1997 Audit, gave rise to proximate relationships, but the increase in Livent’s liquidation deficit which arose from its reliance on the Press Release and Comfort Letter connected with the first undertaking was not a reasonably foreseeable injury. However, the injury that arose to Livent from the negligent handling of the 1997 audit was reasonably foreseeable, and there was no basis in distinguishing this case from the facts that arose in Hercules.

In response to McLachlin CJ's assertion that, while the above framework for analysis was conceptually correct, residual policy considerations would have also defeated Livent's claim in this case, the majority declared:

- The character of indeterminacy has temporal, claimant and value aspects, none of which arise here.
- A remoteness analysis does not apply, as the duty analysis is concerned with the type of injury that is reasonably foreseeable as flowing from the defendant’s conduct, whereas the remoteness analysis is concerned with the reasonable foreseeability of the actual injury suffered by the plaintiff. However, Livent's loss was reasonably foreseeable.
- The "SAAMCO principle" (Note: South Australia Asset Management Corp v York Montague Ltd [1996] UKHL 10, [1997] AC 191 (20 June 1996)) does not apply in the present case, as "the shareholders’ capacity to oversee the conduct of Livent’s business was entirely dependent upon the statutory audit preceding that oversight."

While Canadian Dredge remains authoritative as to the application of the doctrine of corporate identification, its principles provide a sufficient basis to find that the actions of a directing mind be attributed to a corporation, not a necessary one, and, where its application would render meaningless the very purpose for which a duty of care was recognized, such application will rarely be in the public interest.

As to the question of contributory negligence, the Negligence Act in Ontario requires that a plaintiff’s fault be factored into the apportionment of damages. However, corporate identification is a prerequisite to the plaintiff, Livent, being at fault. Therefore, the Act only makes contribution by a negligent plaintiff mandatory; it does not make attribution of negligence to a plaintiff mandatory.

== Impact ==
As the SCC held in Hercules, "if an action is to be brought [against an auditor] in respect of such losses, it must be brought either by the corporation itself (through management) or by way of a derivative action." The case was notable in that it was initiated by Livent's bondholders, who were not in a position to sue directly but did finance the special receiver (acting on behalf of the corporation), whose litigation will enable them to receive a large part of the award. The win proves that this indirect route can succeed, but it will most likely benefit creditors more than shareholders. While Hercules expressed concern about the effect of indeterminate liability upon an auditor's duty of care, Livent found that it was not of sufficient concern, as well as declaring that auditors are no longer insulated from liability on the basis of policy concerns.

The SCC also observed that "the liability that could attach to one year’s negligent audit could not extend beyond the following year’s audit," which has been observed to be a significant finding in limiting potential liability.

The SCC's holding that a proximate relationship will preclude indeterminate liability in any event, in the context of a statutory audit, has been observed to be a key development in Canadian jurisprudence. Such jurisprudence was already developing, and at least one other ruling, in similar circumstances and with similar effect, was already made in a summary judgment in Ontario, even before the SCC handed down its judgment.

There are still uncertainties as to the extent to which the decision will affect the dynamics and details of the audit process. The Capital Markets Institute of the Rotman School of Management at the University of Toronto hosted a panel in January 2018 to assess the implications of the decision for auditor responsibility, governance and Canadian public corporations. It is quite likely that audit firms will face greater insurance premiums as a result of their now-higher risk exposure, which will thus result in debate as to how that risk should be allocated (with likely cascading down into higher audit fees to be charged to all clients).

Jurisprudence in this matter is mixed within the various members of the British Commonwealth. The Commercial Court of England and Wales stated in January 2019 that it did "not consider the Livent decision to be of any real assistance in identifying the scope of the duty of an auditor under English law, or as to the circumstances in which legal causation will be established. It appears from a consideration of the majority judgment that the approach to scope of duty in Canadian law is not identical to that in English law as it stands today, (Note: because of the House of Lords overruling Anns v Merton in 1990, in Murphy v Brentwood District Council [1991] UKHL 2, [1991] 1 AC 398 (26 July 1990)) nor does there appear to have been any detailed analysis of the correlation or otherwise between the auditors' negligence and the particular losses claimed, which also involves a consideration of what reliance there was (on which the majority and the Chief Justice differed as to the existence of any such reliance)." (Note: Assetco Plc v Grant Thornton UK LLP [2019] EWHC 150 (Comm) at para. 955 (31 January 2019))
