= ACRES v Tan Boon Kwee =

Leading Singapore court case on negligence

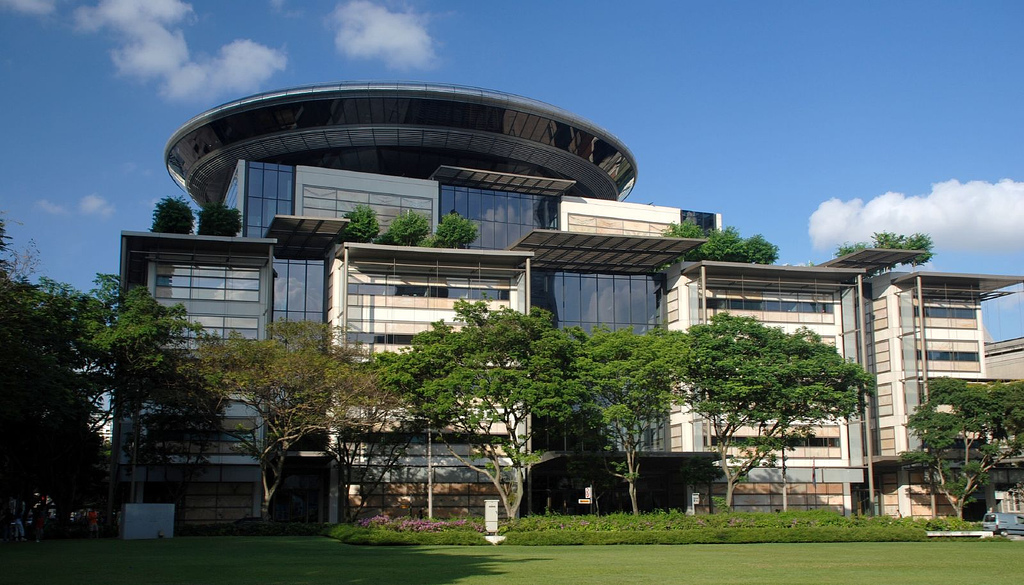
- Court: Court of Appeal of Singapore
- Full case name: Animal Concerns Research & Education Society v Tan Boon Kwee
- Decided: 20 January 2011
- Citations: [2011] 2 SLR 146; [2011] SGCA 2

Court membership
- Judges sitting: Chao Hick Tin; Andrew Phang; V K Rajah

Keywords
- Duty of care; Negligence; Tort

Animal Concerns Research & Education Society v Tan Boon Kwee [2011] SGCA 2 is a leading case in the law of negligence in Singapore. It was an appeal to the Singapore Court of Appeal by the Animal Concerns Research and Education Society (ACRES) on a lawsuit alleging that Tan Boon Kwee, a contractor, had polluted land. The court ruled in favour of ACRES, awarding over $25 million in damages; however, the majority was not recovered due to Tan's inability to pay.

ACRES established a number of key principles in the application of the Spandeck test in negligence. In it, Justice Andrew Phang found that the existence of the arbitration clause in Spandeck was what negated the imposition of a duty of care, and that contracts in themselves do not preclude a tortious relationship from arising. He also noted that the test of "legal proximity" need sometimes be considered beyond mere physical proximity. At the policy stage, Phang ruled that positive policy considerations should be weighed in tandem with negative ones.

== Background ==
ACRES is a charity that engages in animal conservation work. It engaged A.n.A Contractor Pte Ltd in constructing an animal shelter. A.n.A subsequently employed Tan Boon Kwee, a director of the company, to supervise the construction of the site. Originally, the site was to be constructed by levelling the soil on the site; however, under Tan's supervision, soil from another site was brought in instead, resulting in severe soil pollution. At the court of first instance (the Singapore High Court), ACRES sued A.n.A for breach of contract and Tan for negligence in supervising the work. The court allowed the claim for breach of contract but not in negligence. ACRES appeals to the Singapore Court of Appeal on the claim in negligence.

== Judgment ==
Justice Andrew Phang, in delivering the judgment of the court, allowed ACRES's appeal, overruling the high court's decision on negligence. The high court judge ruled that s 10(5)(b) of the Building Control Act did not impose a duty of care upon the defendant. However, Phang ruled that the Act did preclude the present appeal as the statute concerned "structural elements", whereas the present case comprised "earth filling".

Applying the Spandeck test, he affirmed that claims of pure economic loss in curing physical damage were allowed. He ruled that the defendant could factually foresee loss as a result of negligence, that there was proximity between plaintiff and defendant, and that there were no policy reasons to negate the imposition of a duty of care.

On the proximity limb in Spandeck, Phang focussed upon the test of legal proximity beyond the three proximities of physical, causal, and circumstantial proximity in Spandeck. Phang found that the position that Tan occupied, as a "clerk of works" had a historical and legal basis for generally assuming responsibility to a client over construction, "regardless of whether they are in a formal employer-employee relationship". Additionally, Tan's position as both a clerk of works and a director of the contracting company posed an "exceptional fact situation, for clerks of work in claims of negligence should usually not be held fully liable for damages but playing some role in contributory negligence or vicarious liability. Arising from the "variation in qualifications of clerks of works", Phang noted that the nature of clerks of works meant that they owed a limited scope of duty to clients, if any. Phang ruled that the general principles of when liability can be established must be considered in regard to the facts, citing Hedley Byrne as an example of when a general principle of imposing duty was not applied. As a matter of fact, Phang found that Tan voluntarily assumed responsibility of supervising construction, and that he must have also known that ACRES relied on that assumption of responsibility in engaging with A.n.A, applying the twin criteria test in Hedley.

Phang distinguished the present case from the case of Spandeck, where it was held that the contractual relationship between parties precluded a duty of care in tort from arising. He found that the crux of the judgment in Spandeck was that the existence of an arbitration clause indicated that parties wanted to exclude a duty in tort from their contractual relationship. As no such clause was in the present case, and because "[t]he mere fact that there is a pre-existing contractual relationship or backdrop between parties should not... exclude a duty of care...", Phang imposed a prima facie duty of care on Tan.

On the policy limb in Spandeck, Phang considered three policy considerations: statutory duty; the corporate veil of the respondent; and the respondent's conflict of interest. In clarifying the approach outlined in Spandeck, he noted that whilst the limb of policy was to be used to negate a prima facie duty of care, it "does not mean that courts cannot... have due regard to the presence of policy considerations" and that "courts may sometimes need to deploy such countervailing positive policy considerations in order to dismiss spurious negative [ones]".

First, he distinguished the present case from the English case of Murphy v Brentwood DC, stating that whilst the relevant statute in Murphy regulated the impositions of duty, the Building Control Act did not. Phang interpreted the Act as concerning "purely criminal sanctions". He also ruled "the fact that the Act does not cover a particular situation" can give way to the possibility that such a situation is one that "the courts should remedy, as opposed to the possibility that the Legislature intended for such a situation to be completely unregulated by common law". The policy ground of "public and workplace safety" was also a reason considered in not allowing the policy consideration of statute to negate the imposition of duty.

Second, Phang found that imposing a duty on Tan himself rather than A.n.A would not be "an unwarranted lifting of the corporate veil" as the negligent acts arose from his acting in a personal capacity as a clerk of works rather than A.n.A's corporate actions. Third, Phang found that the positive policy consideration Tan appointed himself as a clerk of works, in doing so misrepresenting himself to the Building and Construction Authority, was one that made the imposition of duty even more justiciable.

Overall, Phang found that Tan had clearly breached the duty of care owed to ACRES, and that there was causation and remoteness on the part of Tan's actions. Phang did not accept Tan's argument that Tan did not breach his duty as a clerk of works because what he knew as in the capacity of a clerk was different from what he knew in the capacity as a director, reasoning that the "distinction [w]as somewhat unreal".

== Significance ==
ACRES was a leading development in the autochthonous Singapore law of negligence, having been applied in other leading cases such as NTUC Foodfare Co-operative Ltd v SIA Engineering and Go Dante Yap v Bank Austria Creditanstalt. Academic scholarship have generally viewed ACRES favourably, with Margaret Fordham describing it as a "welcome addition to the Spandeck jurisprudence". Academic commentators have noted many significant theoretical developments in ACRES to the Spandeck test. For one, the court in ACRES acknowledged that proximity factors could also be factors in policy. Commentators have also pointed how the court ACRES integrated the requirement of knowledge in Hedley Byrne into the separate requirement of reliance, how it affirmed that the policy stage was ultimately a negative one, and how it indicated that duties in tort must be explicitly excluded through the structuring of a contract. Nonetheless, some have described the policy approach in ACRES has been described as "a simple balancing exercise", one that demonstrates how "the Singapore courts have not faced any formidable challenge in having to balance positive and negative policy considerations" using the Spandeck test.

Some have criticised the uncertainty brought about by the definition of proximity, noting that while in ACRES the three proximities of physical, causal, and circumstantial proximity were specifically noted, the court did not actually consider the proximities in its judgment, choosing instead to focus on the voluntary assumption of responsibility. In reference to other cases, some have argued that the voluntary assumption of responsibility test in ACRES cannot explain judgments that appear to have disregarded assumption of responsibility as the requirement for proximity.

== Aftermath ==
An award of damages was made in 2013, giving ACRES $26.5 million in damages, largely owing to the cost of cleanup. ACRES was not able to claim the full amount of damages from the suit as Tan Boon Kwee became bankrupt in 2012 owing to legal fees. Tan was later imprisoned in 2015 after criminally attempting to avoid paying damages to ACRES.
