= Spring v Guardian Assurance plc =

United Kingdom labour law court case

- Court: House of Lords
- Decided: 7 July 1994
- Citation: [1994] UKHL 7, [1995] 2 AC 296

Court membership
- Judges sitting: Lord Keith of Kinkel; Lord Goff of Chieveley; Lord Lowry; Lord Slynn of Hadley; Lord Woolf

Keywords
- Employee, reference

Spring v Guardian Assurance plc [1994] UKHL 7, [1995] 2 AC 296 is a UK labour law and English tort law case, concerning the duty to provide accurate information when writing an employee reference.

== Facts ==
The plaintiff was employed by a company that acted as estate agents and agents for the sale of insurance products by Guardian Insurance, the latter of which it was designated as an "appointed representative" (Note: within the meaning of s. 44 of the Financial Services Act 1986) under rules issued by LAUTRO. (Note: The Life Assurance and Unit Trust Regulatory Organisation, a self-regulatory organization under the Financial Services Authority (since replaced by the Prudential Regulation Authority).) In that regard, the plaintiff was designated as a "company representative" of Guardian Assurance, (Note: in accordance with rule 1.2 of the LAUTRO Rules 1988) and thus authorized to sell Guardian insurance policies and to advise on their merits.

When the plaintiff's employer was sold to Guardian, its new chief executive did not get on with the plaintiff, and the latter was subsequently dismissed without explanation. He then sought to form his own business selling insurance, and approached the Scottish Amicable Life Assurance Society to be appointed as one of their company representatives.

LAUTRO rules required its members to take "reasonable steps to satisfy itself that he is of good character and of the requisite aptitude and competence, and those steps shall ... include ... the taking up of references relating to character and experience." Guardian Assurance sent unsatisfactory references for Mr Spring, not just to Scottish Amicable, but also to two other companies that were considering a similar appointment. He claimed this amounted to negligent misstatement, and that the company was liable for damages in tort. He accordingly sued for malicious falsehood, breach of contract and negligence.

== Judgment ==
By 4-1, the House of Lords held that Guardian Insurance owed the plaintiff a duty of care in tort, under the principle first expressed in Hedley Byrne & Co Ltd v Heller & Partners Ltd and later expanded upon in Anns v Merton LBC. By 3-2, it further held that, "Where the relationship between the parties is that of employer and employee, the duty of care could be expressed as arising from an implied term of the contract of employment."

The trial judge had also ruled that the claim for malicious falsehood had not been made out, and that was not subsequently appealed. All Lords noted that, in cases such as this, the defence of qualified privilege would defeat such an action unless the plaintiff proved malice, and it was justified on policy grounds first expressed by Lord Diplock in Horrocks v Lowe, which was subsequently expanded upon in New Zealand jurisprudence in a manner endorsed by Lord Keith.

The House of Lords held that sending a bad reference, if it contained inaccurate information, could be a breach of duty in tort for negligence.

Lord Woolf agreed that negligent misstatement causing economic loss is actionable, but dissented on the outcome, explaining that the importance should not be exaggerated for the reasons given in Caparo Industries plc v Dickman concerning the required degree of foreseeability and proximity.

== Impact and aftermath ==
Although the Anns test had been restricted by the Lords' 1990 ruling in Murphy v Brentwood DC, Spring was held to be a case where the second branch of the test could be properly applied.

=== Further developments in England and Wales ===
While there is a duty of care in the preparation of a reference, the employer does not have a general duty to provide one in cases other than where a subsequent employer is required to receive it, and it does not matter what form the reference might take.

In the United Kingdom, references can be disclosed to the person about whom they are written, under the subject access provisions of the Data Protection Act 1998. As a result, together with the duty of care under Spring, many organizations have issued guidance as to best practice to be undertaken by reference providers.

The duty of care has also been held to apply in non-reference situations, as noted in 2011 in McKie v Swindon College. In another case, the Court of Appeal of England and Wales has held that "a reference must not give an unfair or misleading impression overall, even if its discrete components are factually correct." However, while a reference must be accurate and fair, it is not necessary to report all material facts concerning an individual, but it can be argued that, if an agreed reference arising from a settlement agreement is misleadingly incomplete, the employer can be sued by a subsequent employer for breaching its duty of care. The Employment Appeal Tribunal, in an unfair dismissal case, ruled that, in preparing a reference, it was not reasonable to provide details of complaints against an employee of which the employee was not aware.

The Court of Appeal has further held that, if an employee leaves when an investigation is ongoing but has not been concluded, or where issues arise after an employee leaves that have not been investigated, employers can disclose this information but should do so in a measured and fair way, which will be particularly important if to omit this information would mean providing a misleading reference.

=== Other jurisdictions ===
In Canada, the question of negligent misrepresentation had already been addressed in 1993 by the Supreme Court of Canada in Queen v Cognos, in which a five-part test was devised to determine where a claim could succeed:

1. a duty of care exists based on a special relationship between the representor and the representee;
2. the representation must be untrue, inaccurate or misleading;
3. the representor must have acted negligently in making the misrepresentation;
4. the representee must have relied, in a reasonable manner, on the negligent misrepresentation; and
5. reliance must have been detrimental to the representee in the sense that damages resulted.

The SCC later adopted Spring for representations concerning those associated with the representor in Young v Bella, in which the Court declared, "There is no reason in principle why negligence actions should not be allowed to proceed where (a) proximity and foreseeability have been established, and (b) the damages cover more than just harm to the plaintiff’s reputation (i.e. where there are further damages arising from the defendant’s negligence)... In fact, all of the cases cited by the respondents as standing for the proposition that defamation had 'cornered the market' on reputation damages were cases in which (unlike here) there was no pre-existing relationship between the parties that gave rise to a duty of care."

== See also ==
- UK labour law

== Cases in other jurisdictions ==
- Austin v Torrington Co, 810 F.2d 416 (4th Cir. 1987), archived from the original on 5 February 2016.
