= Practice Statement =

1966 statement made in the House of Lords

The Practice Statement [1966] 3 All ER 77 was a statement made in the House of Lords by Lord Gardiner LC on 26 July 1966 on behalf of himself and the Lords of Appeal in Ordinary, that they would depart from precedent in the Lords in order to achieve justice.

== Background ==
Until the year 1966, the House of Lords in the United Kingdom was bound to follow all of its previous decisions under the principle of stare decisis, even if this created "injustice" and "unduly restrict(s) the proper development of the law" (London Tramways Co. v London County Council [1898] AC 375). The Practice Statement 1966 is authority for the House of Lords to depart from their previous decisions. It does not affect the precedential value of cases in lower courts; all other courts that recognise the Supreme Court (formerly the House of Lords) as the court of last resort are still bound by Supreme Court (and House of Lords) decisions. Before this, the only way a binding precedent could be avoided was to create new legislation on the matter.

A germane example is the case of Anderton v Ryan (1985) where the House of Lords interpreted the Criminal Attempts Act 1981 in such a way as to make the Act virtually ineffective. Only one year later in R v Shivpuri (1986) Lord Bridge (a member of the erroneous majority in Anderton) acknowledged the error and said "the Practice Statement is an effective abandonment of our pretension to infallibility. If a serious error embodied in a decision of this House has been distorted by the law, the sooner it is corrected the better".

By contrast, in Knuller v DPP, Lord Reid, who had previously given a strong dissenting judgment in Shaw v DPP, said while he still disagreed with the majority decision in that case, in the interests of certainty he would not overturn Shaw (even though the Practice Statement had given authority to do so).

Suggestions that a rigid adherence to stare decisis be dropped had been made prior to 1966, initially by Lord Wright in an article for the Cambridge Law Journal in 1943, and by Lord Gardiner and others in the 1963 book Law Reform Now.

== Content ==
This is the text of the Practice Statement:

Their Lordships regard the use of precedent as an indispensable foundation upon which to decide what is the law and its application to individual cases. It provides at least some degree of certainty upon which individuals can rely in the conduct of their affairs, as well as a basis for orderly development of legal rules.

Their Lordships nevertheless recognise that too rigid adherence to precedent may lead to injustice in a particular case and also unduly restrict the proper development of the law. They propose therefore, to modify their present practice and, while treating former decisions of this house as normally binding, to depart from a previous decision when it appears right to do so.

In this connection they will bear in mind the danger of disturbing retrospectively the basis on which contracts, settlement of property, and fiscal arrangements have been entered into and also the especial need for certainty as to the criminal law.

This announcement is not intended to affect the use of precedent elsewhere than in this House.

— Lord Gardiner's statement in the House of Lords, 26 July 1966

== Reception ==
Louis Blom-Cooper described the change brought about by the Practice Statement as being as if the Lords "dropped a pebble into the judicial pool that produced not merely a few ripples but also a seismic wave in English juridicial thinking ... the story of that legally historic event displays the carapace of traditional English lawyers' disinclination readily to accept radical change and to the cautious application of such change, once it is ultimately conceded".

In 2006, Lord Bingham stated of the application of the statement:

Over the past 40 years the House has exercised its power to depart from its own precedent rarely and sparingly. It has never been thought enough to justify doing so that a later generation of Law Lords would have resolved an issue or formulated a principle differently from their predecessors.

Following the passage of the Constitutional Reform Act 2005, the Supreme Court of the United Kingdom was established in 2009. It follows the precedent of its predecessor. In Austin v Mayor and Burgesses of the London Borough of Southwark Lord Hope, writing for the majority, comments on the Practice Statement's applicability to the new court:

25. The Supreme Court has not thought it necessary to re-issue the Practice Statement as a fresh statement of practice in the Court’s own name. This is because it has as much effect in this Court as it did before the Appellate Committee in the House of Lords. It was part of the established jurisprudence relating to the conduct of appeals in the House of Lords which was transferred to this Court by section 40 of the Constitutional Reform Act 2005.

== Invocations in case law ==
Between 1966 and the replacement of the House of Lords by the Supreme Court in 2009, the Practice Statement was explicitly invoked in 21 cases, including:

- Conway v Rimmer, overruling Duncan v Cammell Laird Co
- Herrington v British Railways Board, overruling Robert Addie & Sons (Colliers) Ltd v Dumbreck
- R v Shivpuri, overruling Anderton v Ryan
- R v G, overruling R v Caldwell
- Murphy v Brentwood DC, overruling Anns v Merton LBC
- Crown v Adomako, overruling R v Zuckerberg

Subsequent invocations of the Practice Statement by the Supreme Court include:

- Knauer v Ministry of Justice, overruling Cookson v Knowles and Graham v Dodds

== See also ==
- Re Spectrum Plus Ltd
- Young v Bristol Aeroplane Co Ltd—sets out when the Court of Appeal may depart from its own precedent
