= Canadian National Railway Co v Norsk Pacific Steamship Co =

- Supreme Court of Canada

Hearing: May 2, 1991 Judgment: April 30, 1992
- Full case name: Norsk Pacific Steamship Company Limited, Norsk Pacific Marine Services Ltd., The Tug Jervis Crown and Francis MacDonnell v. Canadian National Railway Company
- Citations: [1992] 1 SCR 1021, (1992), 91 DLR (4th) 289
- Docket No.: 21838
- Ruling: Appeal dismissed; CN is entitled to recovery from Norsk

Holding
- Pure economic loss is compensable when it falls under the category of relational economic loss. The plaintiff's contractual relationship with the property owner whose property has been damaged can be sufficient to hold the defendant tortfeasor liable.

Court membership
- Chief Justice: Antonio Lamer; Puisne Justices: Gérard La Forest, Claire L'Heureux-Dubé, John Sopinka, Charles Gonthier, Peter Cory, Beverley McLachlin, William Stevenson, Frank Iacobucci

Reasons given
- Majority: McLachlin J., joined by L'Heureux-Dubé and Cory JJ.
- Concurrence: Stevenson J.
- Dissent: La Forest J., joined by Sopinka and Iacobucci JJ.
- Lamer C.J. and Gonthier J. took no part in the consideration or decision of the case.

Canadian National Railway Co v Norsk Pacific Steamship Co, [1992] 1 SCR 1021 is a leading Supreme Court of Canada decision on pure economic loss in tort law. The court recognized situations in which pure economic loss is compensable. In particular, the court held that relational economic loss falls within the category of losses that are sufficiently proximate to give rise to a duty of care.

== Background ==
A barge being towed in heavy fog by tug Jervis Crown, owned and operated by the Norsk Pacific Steamship Co. and Norsk Pacific Marine Services Ltd., collided with the New Westminster Railway Bridge, which spans the Fraser River between Surrey and New Westminster. Canadian National Railway (CN) was the primary user (86% of total use) of the bridge owned by Public Works Canada (PWC). The bridge is the sole direct link for several railway companies between the north and south shores of the Fraser in Metro Vancouver.

The tug owners were familiar with the area and were at all times aware that the bridge was mainly used by CN and was essential to their operations.

After the accident, it took several weeks to repair the bridge, during which time CN and other railways were forced to re-route traffic. This increased the cost of operations and reduced the freight capacity during that time.

The railways sued the tug owners and operators for the additional cost incurred as a result of the closure of the bridge. The tug owners claimed that there was no right to recover, as CN was not the owner of the bridge and suffered no direct physical or property damage. Their losses were purely economic (based on lost profits and increased operational costs), which were not generally recoverable in tort law.

== Opinion of the court ==
McLachlin J. (as she then was), joined by L'Heureux-Dubé and Cory JJ., found in favour for the plaintiff CN. Using the Anns test as adopted by the Supreme Court of Canada in Kamloops (City) v. Nielsen, she found that Norsk owed a duty of care to CN, making the loss recoverable.

Under the first branch of the Anns test, she held that there must be sufficient proximity between the parties in addition to the damage being foreseeable. In the context of contractual relational economic loss, there must be a close examination of the facts to determine if there is sufficient closeness, including "physical propinquity, assumed or imposed obligations and close causal connection."

Under the second branch of the Anns test, she rejected three broad policy arguments advanced by the defendant: (1) the insurance argument was questionable because it assumes that victims are better suited to insure themselves than tortfeasors, (2) the loss-spreading justification is inadequate because it does not justify cases where there is only one victim, and (3) the contractual allocation of risk argument was rejected because it assumes that all businesses efficiently allocate risk and have equal bargaining power, and overlooks the concept of fault in determining liability.

Applying the law to the case, McLachlin found that CN was sufficiently close to Norsk as well as the property in question. She noted that the relationship between CN and PWC was such that the bridge could be considered a "joint" or "common venture" under which recovery for economic loss had been allowed in the United Kingdom.

== Concurrence ==
Stevenson J., writing for himself, concurred with McLachlin J. on the result but did not fully endorse her view on relational economic loss. Mainly focusing on foreseeability, he held that:

There is no danger of indeterminate liability, and thus no policy reason to deny recoverability, when the defendant actually knows or ought to know of a specific individual or individuals, as opposed to a general or unascertained class of the public, who is or are likely to suffer a foreseeable kind of loss as a result of negligence by that defendant.

== Dissent ==
LaForest J. held that no duty of care arises unless the case falls within narrow exceptional categories, which does not include the case at hand. He would have upheld the traditional bright line rule excluding recovery for economic loss caused by damage to third party property.

He questioned the applicability of tort compensation in such cases and wrote that "it is legitimate to consider which party is the better loss bearer in this type of case." He found that "a denial of recovery in this case is justified in light of C.N.'s overwhelmingly superior risk bearing capacity on the facts of this case."

In addition, LaForest J. argued that McLachlin's approach would create uncertainty in the law, as the plaintiffs could be an indeterminately large class and there is no way for the defendant to know who might be affected by damage caused by their tugboats. Under McLachlin's approach, both parties would require insurance at a high cost and thus is not economically efficient.

== Aftermath ==
The state of the law on economic loss was unclear immediately following the decision in Norsk, as neither McLachlin nor LaForest's judgments were the clear majority.

In Bow Valley Husky (Bermuda) Ltd. v. Saint John Shipbuilding Ltd., [1997] 3 SCR 1210, McLachlin clarified the result, affirming that recovery for contractual relational economic loss is the exception rather than the norm. There is a presumption against contractual relational economic loss, subject to recognized exceptional categories:

1. Where the claimant has a possessory or proprietary interest in the damaged property;
2. General average contribution cases; and
3. Where the relationship between the claimant and the property owner constitutes a joint venture.

In Martel Building v. Canada, [2000] 2 SCR 860, the court summed up the state of the law, partially endorsing LaForest's judgment with regards to the categories of cases that can potentially give rise to compensable economic loss. These five categories were:

1. The Independent Liability of Statutory Public Authorities;
2. Negligent Misrepresentation;
3. Negligent Performance of a Service;
4. Negligent Supply of Shoddy Goods or Structures;
5. Relational Economic Loss.

These categories are not closed but will be approached on a case-by-case basis based on the rationale from Norsk and Bow Valley.

== See also ==
- List of Supreme Court of Canada cases (Lamer Court)
