= R v Shivpuri =

Regina v Pyare Shivpuri
- Court: House of Lords
- Decided: 15 May 1986
- Citation: [1987] AC 1; [1986] UKHL 2
- Cases cited: Anderton v Ryan [1985] AC 560; R v Hussain [1969] 2 QB 567
- Legislation cited: Criminal Attempts Act 1981

Case history
- Prior actions: Conviction in Reading County Court, 24 February 1984; Conviction upheld (appeal denied) in the Court of Appeal, 5 November 1984 (both unreported)
- Subsequent action: None

Court membership
- Judges sitting: Lord Hailsham LC, Lord Elwyn-Jones, Lord Scarman, Lord Bridge and Lord Mackay

R v Shivpuri [1986] UKHL 2 is a House of Lords case in English law as to whether a criminal attempt which had a "more than merely preparatory act" and mens rea of an inchoate stage but of a crime which transpired to be impossible (or rendered lawful) in its completion – as the actus reus unwittingly related to a lawful, not what the defendant apprehended to be an unlawful substance – amounted to an attempt to commit a crime. The judicial panel, the highest court of England, decided it would amount to the crimes of attempted dealing in and harbouring a controlled drug, with intent to evade the prohibition of importation of the same. In doing so, it overturned its own ruling the year before in Anderton v Ryan, applying the Practice Statement of 1966.

== Facts ==
The appellant, on a visit to India, was approached by a man named Desai, who offered to pay him £1,000 if, on his return to England, he would receive a suitcase which a courier would deliver to him containing packages of substance which the appellant was then to distribute according to instructions he would receive. The suitcase was duly delivered to him in Cambridge. On 30 November 1982, acting on instructions, the appellant went to Southall station to deliver a package of substance to a third party. Outside the station, he and the man he had met by appointment were arrested. A package containing a powdered substance was found in the appellant's shoulder bag. At the appellant's flat in Cambridge, he produced to customs officers the suitcase from which the lining had been ripped out and the remaining packages of the same powdered substance. In answer to questions by customs officers and in a long written statement the appellant made what amounted to a full confession of having played his part, as described, as recipient and distributor of illegally imported drugs. The appellant believed the drugs to be either heroin or cannabis. In due course the powdered substance in the several packages was scientifically analysed and found not to be a controlled drug but snuff or some similar harmless vegetable matter.

== Judgment ==
The certified question from the Court of Appeal (Criminal Division) was "Does a person commit an offence under section 1 of the Criminal Attempts Act 1981 where, if the facts were as that person believed them to be, the full offence would have been committed by him, but where on the true facts the offence which that person set out to commit was in law impossible, e.g., because the substance imported and believed to be heroin was not heroin but a harmless substance?"

The House of Lords adjudged that the certified question be answered in the affirmative. In doing so, it overturned its own ruling the year before in Anderton v Ryan, applying the Practice Statement of 1966. In his opinion, Lord Bridge argued that section 1(2) of the Criminal Attempts Act, which states that a person may be guilty of attempting to commit a crime even when the actual commission of the offence is impossible, implies that section 1(1) only requires that a person's act to be more than merely preparatory to the commission of an intended offence, rather than the commission of an actual offence.
