= Anderton v Ryan =

1985 House of Lords case related to impossible attempts in English criminal law

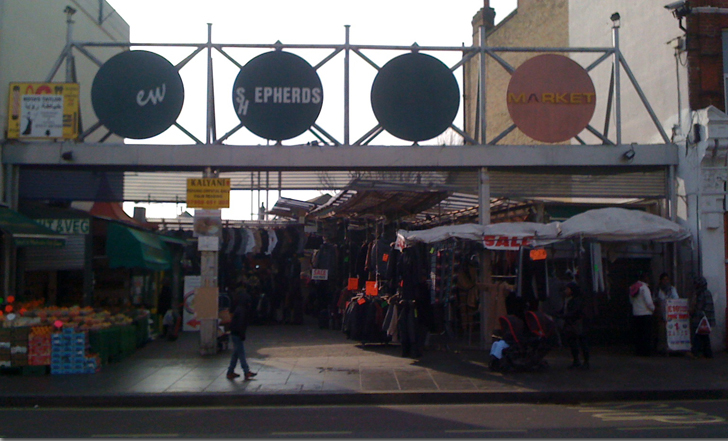
- Court: House of Lords
- Full case name: Anderton v Ryan
- Decided: 9 May 1985
- Citation: [1985] AC 560; 2 WLR 968; 2 All ER 355; 81 Cr App R 166, HL(E)
- Transcript: judgment
- Legislation cited: Criminal Attempts Act 1981

Case history
- Prior actions: Conviction upheld in a law-reported decision of the Divisional Court of the High Court (Queens Bench Decision) [1985] AC 560; [1985] 2 WLR 23; [1985] 1 All ER 138; 80 Cr App R 235, DC (later "followed" (confirmed to be correct))

Keywords
- Attempt; Mistaken belief; handling or purchasing stolen goods; legitimate goods; Overturned English legal precedents

Anderton v Ryan [1985] is a House of Lords case in English criminal law (in the highest court of the land at the time), on whether an act which would amount to an offence but which by virtue of a misunderstanding of the goods involved was impossible (nonetheless a fully believed offence by the perpetrator at the time, specifically of purchasing posited stolen goods) breaks section 1 of the Criminal Attempts Act 1981; the court established against a similar defendant the next year that the reverse should hold true in future (per R v Shivpuri).

== Facts ==
A woman purchased a video cassette recorder (VCR) on the belief that it was stolen. She reported an unrelated burglary in her house to the police. While they were investigating the burglary, she confessed to having purchased the VCR she believed to be stolen. No evidence was found to confirm that the VCR had been stolen. She was convicted of attempted handling of stolen goods.

== Judgment ==
The court convened 13 months and five days after the law-reported decision of the quickly referred conviction to the Divisional Court of the High Court, Queen's Bench Division (from the local magistrates' initial decision). The Court of Appeal was skipped because the case was cleared in timetables and administratively for a "leapfrog appeal" (direct to the House of Lords).

The House of Lords decided that impossibility was not within the scope of the offence under s. 1(2) of the Criminal Attempts Act (nor any other residual offence from earlier legal precedents). That is, impossibility of the complete act rendered the inchoate offence also an impossibility. The conviction was thus quashed.

== Significance ==
The case R v Shivpuri overruled the decision a year later and represents an example of the House of Lords Judicial Committee overruling its jurisprudence under the Practice Statement 1966.

== See also ==
- English criminal law
