= D&F Estates Ltd v Church Comrs for England and Wales =

D&F Estates Ltd v Church Commissioners for England and Wales
- Court: House of Lords
- Decided: 14 July 1988
- Citation: [1989] AC 177; [1988] 2 All ER 992
- Transcript: Judgment

Court membership
- Judges sitting: Lord Bridge of Harwich; Lord Templeman; Lord Ackner; Lord Oliver of Aylmerton; Lord Jauncey of Tullichettle

Keywords
- duty of care, physical damage, pure economic loss

D&F Estates Ltd v Church Commissioners for England and Wales [1989] AC 177; [1988] 2 All ER 992 was a landmark House of Lords judgment in English law which restricted the duty of care in negligence to cases of physical damage and injury rather than pure economic loss.

== Facts ==
The Church Commissioners owned a block of flats built by a firm of contractors. The plastering work was sub contracted. Fifteen years after the property was built it was found that the plastering work was defective. As there was no direct contractual relationship between the plaintiff and the defendants an action was brought in tort.

The judge found that all the plaster applied to concrete surfaces was defective because the sub-contractors, using a particular plaster then newly on the market called "Gyplite," had failed to follow the manufacturers' instructions. They should have applied one coat of bonding plaster and one coat of finishing plaster, but instead had interposed a coat of browning plaster (the older time-consuming and less effective method due to the time required for drying) and it was this that in due course caused plaster, which should have remained sound for the lifetime of the building, to lose its key and require replacement. He said:

in my judgment, a careful and competent plasterer would not have taken the risk of departing from what I find to be clear and unambiguous instructions to use bonding plaster followed by finishing plaster on concrete surfaces generally. In other words I consider that the plasterers were at fault. It was suggested on behalf of the plaintiffs that a reason why the plasterers did not follow the manufacturers' instructions was because it was more economical and easier to use undercoats of bonding plaster and browning plaster to achieve the desired thickness instead of a single undercoat of bonding plaster. I am not satisfied, having heard the evidence of Mr. Marshall about the cost of applying the different grades of plaster, that this is the correct explanation and it is not necessary for me to come to any conclusion about it. It is sufficient for me to say that in my judgment the plasterers did not exercise due care in that they failed to follow the manufacturers' instruction.

== Judgment ==
=== Court of Appeal ===
Court of Appeal found that as the contractor had employed a competent sub contractor, therefore no duty of care was owed.

=== House of Lords ===
The House of Lords also confirmed damages are recoverable in tort.

== See also ==
- Pure economic loss in English law
