= Social host liability =

Social host liability is created by a statute or case law that imposes liability on social hosts as a result of their serving alcohol to adults or minors. A social host is most often a private individual who serves alcohol in a non-commercial setting. Persons subject to social-host liability in civil actions are typically those that provided alcohol to the obviously intoxicated social guests who subsequently are involved in vehicle crashes or other activities causing death or injury to third parties, or to minors who are injured as a result of intoxication that results from service of alcohol by the host, but the circumstances under which social host liability can result varies by jurisdiction.

Most people are aware that serving alcohol to people who are below the legal age for the consumption of alcohol is illegal in the United States. Exceptions from that prohibition for service of alcohol to minors in family settings, for religious reasons and other purposes varies by state. In some states a person who serves alcohol to a minor may potentially be held liable if the alcohol provided is found to have contributed to the commission of a crime.

A social host who knowingly serves alcohol to minors or knowingly allows minors to consume alcohol may also potentially face criminal charges.

== United States ==
Within the United States, social host liability for the service of alcohol can vary greatly from state to state. Thirty-one states allow for social host liability for damages or injuries caused by underaged drinkers.

If the underage drinking took place in a minor's home, even if the minor's parents were not present and did not provide the alcohol, the minor's parents may potentially be held liable if they knew or should have known that an underage party would occur while they were away at which minors would consume alcohol, they can potentially be held liable for the minor party-goers' actions on and off their property.

In some states, such as New Hampshire, a minor who serves other minors may be liable for injuries that result from the service.

=== Dram shop acts ===
A related body of law known in the United States as dram shop liability governs the liability of taverns, liquor stores, and other commercial establishments that serve alcoholic beverages.

== Canada ==
In Canada, social host liability for the service of alcohol to adult guests was restricted by the Supreme Court in the case of Childs v. Desormeaux. The court found that social hosts do not have a duty of care to third parties who are injured by an intoxicated guest. The court did not address whether a duty could arise where a social host continued to serve a clearly intoxicated guest with knowledge that the guest would later drive a vehicle.
