= Dutton v Bognor Regis UDC =

Law case

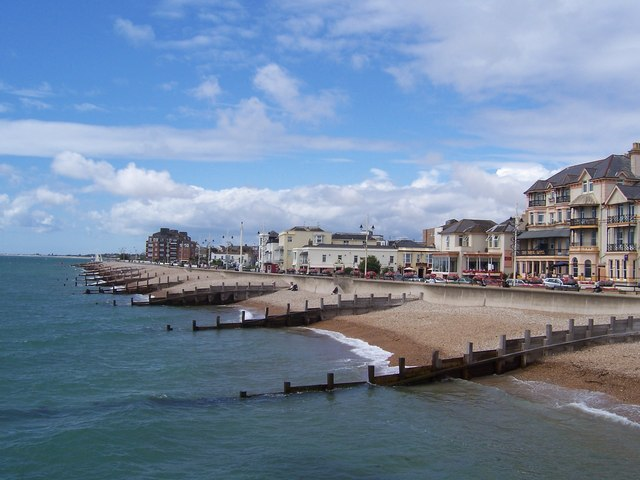
- Bognor Regis
- Court: Court of Appeal
- Full case name: Dutton v Bognor Regis Urban District Council
- Citation: [1972] 1 QB 373, [1972] 2 WLR 299, [1972] 1 All ER 462, [1972] 1 Lloyd's Rep 227

Court membership
- Judges sitting: Lord Denning MR; Sachs LJ; Stamp LJ

Case opinions
- Lord Denning MR

Keywords
- Duty of care, defective premises

Dutton v Bognor Regis Urban District Council [1972] 1 QB 373 is an English contract law and English tort law case concerning defective premises and the limits of contract damages. It was disapproved by the House of Lords in Murphy v Brentwood DC and is now bad law except in Canada and New Zealand.

== Facts ==
Mrs Dutton sought to recover damages from a builder, Bognor Regis Building Co Ltd, and the local council, Bognor Regis Urban District Council, which had certified her house was sound after it emerged that the foundations of her house were defective because it had been built on a rubbish tip. That would have been discoverable if proper checks had been made. Mrs Dutton had bought the building from a Mr Clark, who, in turn, had bought the building from the builder and so Mrs Dutton had no direct contract with either the builder or the council. She settled the claim with the builder for £625 after getting advice that an action in negligence could not succeed, but she continued in an action against the council, and Cusack J awarded damages £2,115. The council appealed.

== Judgment ==
The Court of Appeal held that Mrs Dutton could recover money from the council as an extension of the principle in Donoghue v Stevenson. It was fair and reasonable that the council should be liable to a later purchaser of a house that its surveyor had negligently certified to be sound.

Lord Denning MR's judgment went as follows:

;4. The Position of the Builder

Mr. Tapp submitted that the inspector owed no duty to a purchaser of the house. He said that on the authorities the builder, Mr. Holroyd, owed no duty to a purchaser of the house. The builder was not liable for his negligence in the construction of the house. So also the council's inspector should not be liable for passing the bad work. I would agree that if the builder is not liable for the bad work the council ought not to be liable for passing it. So I will consider whether or not the builder is liable. Mr. Tapp relied on Bottomley v. Bannister [1932] 1 K.B. 458 . That certainly supports his submission. But I do not think it is good law today. In the 19th century, and the first part of this century, most lawyers believed that no one who was not a party to a contract could sue on it or anything arising out of it. They held that if one of the parties to a contract was negligent in carrying it out, no third person who was injured by that negligence could sue for damages on that account. The reason given was that the only duty of care was that imposed by the contract. It was owed to the other contracting party, and to no one else. Time after time counsel for injured plaintiffs sought to escape from the rigour of this rule. But they were met invariably with the answer given by Alderson B. in Winterbottom v. Wright (1842) 10 M. & W. 109, 115:

"If we were to hold that the plaintiff could sue in such a case, there is no point at which such actions would stop. The only safe rule is to confine the right to recover to those who enter into the contract: if we go one step beyond that, there is no reason why we should not go fifty."

So the courts confined the right to recover to those who entered into the contract. If the manufacturer or repairer of an article did it negligently, and someone was injured, the injured person could not recover: see Earl v. Lubbock [1905] 1 K.B. 253 and Blacker v. Lake and Elliot Ltd (1912) 106 L.T. 533. If the landlord of a house contracted with the tenant to repair it and failed to do it - or did it negligently - with the result that someone was injured, the injured person could not recover: see Cavalier v. Pope [1906] A.C. 428 . If the owner of land built a house on it and sold it to a purchaser, but he did his work so negligently that someone was injured, the injured person could not recover: see Bottomley v. Bannister [1932] 1 K.B. 458 . Unless in each case he was a party to the contract.

That 19th century doctrine may have been appropriate in the conditions then prevailing. But it was not suited to the 20th century. Accordingly it was done away with in Donoghue v. Stevenson [1932] A.C. 562 . But that case only dealt with the manufacturer of an article. Cavalier v. Pope (on landlords) and Bottomley v. Bannister (on builders) were considered by the House in Donoghue v. Stevenson [1932] A.C. 562, but they were not overruled. It was suggested that they were distinguishable on the ground that they did not deal with chattels but with real property; see by Lord Atkin at p. 598 and by Lord Macmillan at p. 609. Hence they were treated by the courts as being still cases of authority. So much so that in 1936 a judge at first instance held that a builder who builds a house for sale is under no duty to build it carefully. If a person was injured by his negligence, he could not recover: see Otto v. Bolton & Norris [1936] 2 K.B. 46 .

The distinction between chattels and real property is quite unsustainable. If the manufacturer of an article is liable to a person injured by his negligence, so should the builder of a house be liable. After the lapse of 30 years this was recognised. In Gallagher v. N. McDowell Ltd [1961] N.I. 26, Lord MacDermott C.J. and his colleagues in the Northern Ireland Court of Appeal held that a contractor who built a house negligently was liable to a person injured by his negligence. This was followed by Nield J. in Sharpe v. E. T. Sweeting & Son Ltd [1963] 1 W.L.R. 665 . But the judges in those cases confined themselves to cases in which the builder was only a contractor and was not the owner of the house itself. When the builder is himself the owner, they assumed that Bottomley v. Bannister [1932] 1 K.B. 458 was still authority for exempting him from liability for negligence.

There is no sense in maintaining this distinction. It would mean that a contractor who builds a house on another's land is liable for negligence in constructing it, but that a speculative builder, who buys land and himself builds houses on it for sale, and is just as negligent as the contractor, is not liable. That cannot be right. Each must be under the same duty *394 of care and to the same persons. If a visitor is injured by the negligent construction, the injured person is entitled to sue the builder, alleging that he built the house negligently. The builder cannot defend himself by saying: "True I was the builder; but I was the owner as well. So I am not liable." The injured person can reply: "I do not care whether you were the owner or not, I am suing you in your capacity as builder and that is enough to make you liable."

We had a similar problem some years ago. The liability of a contractor doing work on land was said to be different from the liability of an occupier doing the selfsame work. We held that each was liable for negligence: see Billings (A. C.) & Sons v. Riden [1957] 1 Q.B. 46, and our decision was upheld by the House of Lords: [1958] A.C. 240 : see also Miller v. South of Scotland Electricity Board, 1958 S.C. 20, 37-38.

I hold, therefore, that a builder is liable for negligence in constructing a house - whereby a visitor is injured - and it is no excuse for him to say that he was the owner of it. In my opinion Bottomley v. Bannister [1932] 1 K.B. 458 is no longer authority. Nor is Otto v. Bolton & Norris [1936] 2 K.B. 46 . They are both overruled. Cavalier v. Pope [1906] A.C. 428 has gone too. It was reversed by the Occupiers' Liability Act 1957, section 4 (1) .

5. The Position of the Professional Adviser

Mr. Tapp then submitted another reason for saying that the inspector owed no duty to a purchaser. He said that an inspector is in the same position as any professional man who, by virtue of his training and experience, is qualified to give advice to others on how they should act. He said that such a professional man owed no duty to one who did not employ him but only took the benefit of his work: and that an inspector was in a like position. To support this proposition, Mr. Tapp brought out a long-forgotten case in the House of Lords, Robertson v. Fleming (1861) 4 Macq. 167, a Scottish case about the responsibility of a lawyer. Lord Wensleydale said, at p. 199:

"He only, who by himself, or another as his agent, employs the attorney to do the particular act in which the alleged neglect has taken place, can sue him for that neglect, ..."

That observation was made in 1861 when the legal profession laboured under the fallacy which I have already mentioned - the fallacy by which it was thought that, when one contracting party was negligent, no one could sue him for that negligence except the other contracting party. That doctrine did not avail manufacturers after 1932 - Donoghue v. Stevenson [1932] A.C. 562 : nor did it avail professional men after 1964 - Hedley Byrne & Co. Ltd. v. Heller & Partners Ltd. [1964] A.C. 465 . In neither of those cases, strangely enough, was Robertson v. Fleming, 4 Macq. 167 referred to. But the result of them is to lessen the authority of that case and the observations in it.

Nowadays since Hedley Byrne & Co. Ltd. v. Heller & Partners Ltd. [1964] A.C. 465 it is clear that a professional man who gives guidance to others owes a duty of care, not only to the client who employs him, but also to another who he knows is relying on his skill to save him from harm. It is certain that a banker or accountant is under such a duty. and I see no reason why a solicitor is not likewise. The essence of this proposition, however, is the reliance. In Hedley Byrne v. Heller it was stressed by Lord Reid at p. 486, by Lord Morris of Borth-y-Gest at pp. 502-503, and by Lord Hodson at p. 514. The professional man must know that the other is relying on his skill and the other must in fact rely on it.

6. Reliance

Mr. Tapp made a strong point here about reliance. He said that even if the inspector was under a duty of care, he owed that duty only to those who he knew would rely on this advice - and who did rely on it - and not to those who did not. He said that Mrs. Dutton did not rely on the inspector and, therefore, he owed her no duty. It is at this point that I must draw a distinction between the several categories of professional men. I can well see that in the case of a professional man who gives advice on financial or property matters - such as a banker, a lawyer or an accountant - his duty is only to those who rely on him and suffer financial loss in consequence. But in the case of a professional man who gives advice on the safety of buildings, or machines, or material, his duty is to all those who may suffer injury in case his advice is bad In Candler v. Crane, Christmas & Co. [1951] 2 K.B. 164, 179, I put the case of an analyst who negligently certifies to a manufacturer of food that a particular ingredient is harmless, whereas it is, in fact, poisonous: or the case of an inspector of lifts who negligently reports that a particular lift is safe, whereas it is in fact dangerous. It was accepted that the analyst and the lift inspector would be liable to any person who was injured by consuming the food or using the lift. Since that case the courts have had the instance of an architect or engineer. If he designs a house or a bridge so negligently that it falls down, he is liable to every one of those who are injured in the fall: see Clay v. A. J. Crump & Sons Ltd. [1964] 1 Q.B. 533 . None of those injured would have relied on the architect or the engineer. None of them would have known whether an architect or engineer was employed, or not. But beyond doubt, the architect and engineer would be liable. The reason is not because those injured relied on him, but because he knew, or ought to have known, that such persons might be injured if he did his work badly.

This view is in accord with a case in the U.S.A. - Nelson v. Union Wire Rope Corporation (1964) 199 N.E.Rep. (2d) 769. During the building of a court house, a lift plunged down six floors with 19 workmen aboard. It had been regularly inspected by an insurance company, and passed as safe. The insurance company made these inspections gratuitously in order to promote their business. The inspector was negligent. He passed the lift as safe when it was unsafe. The Supreme Court of Illinois, by a majority, held that the insurance company were liable for the negligence of the inspector. They said, at p. 779, that the defendant's liability "is not limited to such persons as might have relied upon it to act but extends instead to such persons as defendant could reasonably have foreseen would be endangered as the result of negligent performance."

I quite agree.

7. Proximity

Mr. Tapp submitted that in any case the duty ought to be limited to those immediately concerned and not to purchaser after purchaser down the line. There is a good deal in this, but I think the reason is because a subsequent purchaser often has the house surveyed. This intermediate inspection, or opportunity of inspection, may break the proximity. It would certainly do so when it ought to disclose the damage. But the foundations of a house are in a class by themselves. Once covered up, they will not be seen again until the damage appears. The inspector must know this, or, at any rate, he ought to know it. Applying the test laid down by Lord Atkin in Donoghue v. Stevenson [1932] A.C. 562, 580-581, I should have thought that the inspector ought to have had subsequent purchasers in mind when he was inspecting the foundations. He ought to have realised that, if he was negligent, they might suffer damage.

8. Economic Loss

Mr. Tapp submitted that the liability of the council would, in any case, be limited to those who suffered bodily harm: and did not extend to those who only suffered economic loss. He suggested, therefore, that although the council might be liable if the ceiling fell down and injured a visitor, they would not be liable simply because the house was diminished in value. He referred to the recent case of S.C.M. (United Kingdom) Ltd. v. W. J. Whittall & Son Ltd. [1971] 1 Q.B. 337 .

I cannot accept this submission. The damage done here was not solely economic loss. It was physical damage to the house. If Mr. Tapp's submission were right, it would mean that if the inspector negligently passes the house as properly built and it collapses and injures a person, the council are liable: but if the owner discovers the defect in time to repair it - and he does repair it - the council are not liable. That is an impossible distinction. They are liable in either case.

I would say the same about the manufacturer of an article. If he makes it negligently, with a latent defect (so that it breaks to pieces and injures someone), he is undoubtedly liable. Suppose that the defect is discovered in time to prevent the injury. Surely he is liable for the cost of repair.

9. Limitation of Action

Mr. Tapp also said that if this action were allowed, it would expose the council to endless claims. The period of limitation would only start to run when the damage was done, that is, when the cracks appeared in the house. This would mean that they might be liable many years hence. I do not think that is right. The damage was done when the foundations were badly constructed. The period of limitation (six years) then began to run. That appears from Bagot v. Stevens Scanlan & Co. Ltd. [1966] 1 Q.B. 197, 203 . Diplock L.J. said that if the drains were not properly designed and built

"the damage from any breach of that duty must have occurred at the time when the drains were improperly built, because the plaintiff at that time was landed with property which had bad drains when he ought to have been provided with property which had good drains, and the damage, accordingly, occurred on that date."

The council would be protected by a six-year limitation, but the builder might not be. If he covered up his own bad work, he would be guilty of concealed fraud, and the period of limitation would not begin to run until the fraud was discovered: see Applegate v. Moss [1971] 1 Q.B. 406 .

10. Policy

This case is entirely novel. Never before has a claim been made against a council or its surveyor for negligence in passing a house. The case itself can be brought within the words of Lord Atkin in Donoghue v. Stevenson: but it is a question whether we should apply them here. In Dorset Yacht Co. Ltd. v. Home Office [1970] A.C. 1004, Lord Reid said, at p. 1023, that the words of Lord Atkin expressed a principle which ought to apply in general "unless there is some justification or valid explanation for its exclusion." So did Lord Pearson at p. 1054. But Lord Diplock spoke differently. He said it was a guide but not a principle of universal application (p. 1060). It seems to me that it is a question of policy which we, as judges, have to decide. The time has come when, in cases of new import, we should decide them according to the reason of the thing.

In previous times, when faced with a new problem, the judges have not openly asked themselves the question: what is the best policy for the law to adopt? But the question has always been there in the background. It has been concealed behind such questions as: Was the defendant under any duty to the plaintiff? Was the relationship between them sufficiently proximate? Was the injury direct or indirect? Was it foreseeable, or not? Was it too remote? and so forth.

Nowadays we direct ourselves to considerations of policy. In Rondel v. Worsley [1969] 1 A.C. 191, we thought that if advocates were liable to be sued for negligence they would be hampered in carrying out their duties. In Dorset Yacht Co. Ltd. v. Home Office [1970] A.C. 1004, we thought that the Home Office ought to pay for damage done by escaping Borstal boys, if the staff was negligent, but we confined it to damage done in the immediate vicinity. In S.C.M. (United Kingdom) Ltd. v. W. J. Whittall & Son Ltd. [1971] 1 Q.B. 337, some of us thought that economic loss ought not to be put on one pair of shoulders, but spread among all the sufferers. In Launchbury v. Morgans [1971] 2 Q.B. 245, we thought that as the owner of the family car was insured she should bear the loss. In short, we look at the relationship of the parties: and then say, as matter of policy, on whom the loss should fall.

What are the considerations of policy here? I will take them in order.

First, Mrs. Dutton has suffered a grievous loss. The house fell down without any fault of hers. She is in no position herself to bear the loss. Who ought in justice to bear it? I should think those who were responsible. Who are they? In the first place, the builder was responsible. It was he who laid the foundations so badly that the house fell down. In the second place, the council's inspector was responsible. It was his job to examine the foundations to see if they would take the load of the house. He failed to do it properly. In the third place, the council should answer for his failure. They were entrusted by Parliament with the task of seeing that houses were properly built. They received public funds for the purpose. The very object was to protect purchasers and occupiers of houses. Yet they failed to protect them. Their shoulders are broad enough to bear the loss.

Next I ask: is there any reason in point of law why the council should not be held liable? Hitherto many lawyers have thought that a builder (who was also the owner) was not liable. If that were truly the law, I would not have thought it fair to make the council liable when the builder was not liable. But I hold that the builder who builds a house badly is liable, even though he is himself the owner. On this footing, there is nothing unfair in holding the council's surveyor also liable.

Then I ask: If liability were imposed on the council, would it have an adverse effect on the work? Would it mean that the council would not inspect at all, rather than risk liability for inspecting badly? Would it mean that inspectors would be harassed in their work or be subject to baseless charges? Would it mean that they would be extra cautious, and hold up work unnecessarily? Such considerations have influenced cases in the past, as in Rondel v. Worsley [1969] 1 A.C. 191 . But here I see no danger. If liability is imposed on the council, it would tend, I think, to make them do their work better, rather than worse.

Next, I ask: Is there any economic reason why liability should not be imposed on the council? In some cases the law has drawn the line to prevent recovery of damages. It sets a limit to damages for economic loss, or for shock, or theft by escaping convicts. The reason is that if no limit were set there would be no end to the money payable. But I see no such reason here for limiting damages. In nearly every case the builder will be primarily liable. He will be insured and his insurance company will pay the damages. It will be very rarely that the council will be sued or found liable. If it is, much the greater responsibility will fall on the builder and little on the council.

Finally I ask myself: If we permit this new action, are we opening the door too much? Will it lead to a flood of cases which neither the council nor the courts will be able to handle? Such considerations have sometimes in the past led the courts to reject novel claims. But I see no need to reject this claim on this ground. The injured person will always have his claim against the builder. He will rarely allege - and still less be able to prove - a case against the council.

All these considerations lead me to the conclusion that the policy of the law should be, and is, that the council should be liable for the negligence of their surveyor in passing work as good when in truth it is bad.

I would therefore dismiss this appeal. In parting from the case I would like to pay my tribute to the help we have received from counsel on both sides and the very good research they have done in the course of the case.

== See also ==
- English contract law
