= Jordan House Hotel Ltd v Menow =

- Supreme Court of Canada

Hearing: 8–9 November 1972 Judgment: 7 May 1973
- Citations: [1974] SCR 239
- Prior history: APPEAL from Menow v. Honsberger et al., 1970 CanLII 47 (27 April 1970)
- Ruling: Appeal dismissed

Court membership
- Chief Justice: Gérald Fauteux; Puisne Justices: Douglas Abbott, Ronald Martland, Wilfred Judson, Roland Ritchie, Emmett Hall, Wishart Spence, Louis-Philippe Pigeon, Bora Laskin

Reasons given
- Majority: Laskin J, joined by Martland and Spence JJ
- Concurrence: Ritchie J, joined by Judson J
- Fauteux CJ and Abbott, Hall and Pigeon JJ took no part in the consideration or decision of the case.

Jordan House Hotel Ltd v Menow (1973) is a landmark decision of the Supreme Court of Canada on the commercial host liability where the Court held that a bar owner has a duty to reasonably ensure their intoxicated patrons are able to make it home safely.

Menow had a reputation of behaving badly and was banned from the Jordan House Hotel for drunken behavior. Eventually he was allowed back and was allowed to be served alcohol on the condition that he be escorted by a responsible adult. On a later night he went to the hotel bar but was abandoned by his escort for three hours while he was served drinks. He became extremely intoxicated and began to harass other patrons. Menow was soon ejected from the hotel bar and started to make his way home down a highway but was hit by a car.

Menow brought an action against the hotel in tort for violating their duty of care by serving him alcohol and not ensuring he was safe when he left the hotel.

At trial, the court held that the hotel violated a common law duty of care to protect patrons from "danger of personal injury, foreseeable as a result of the eviction". The duty, the trial judge found, could have easily been discharged by calling the police or arrange for a safe way home.

The Supreme Court upheld much of the trial judge's ruling. Ritchie J. found that the hotel was aware of Menow's behaviour yet still assisted him in becoming intoxicated, which they ought to have known might result in danger to Menow. This awareness should have "seized them with a duty to be careful not to serve him with repeated drinks after the effects of what he had already consumed should have been obvious." The breach of duty was a result of both a failure to protect Menow once he became intoxicated and a failure to ensure he did not become intoxicated in the first place.

== See also ==
- Stewart v Pettie [1995] 1 S.C.R. 131
- Childs v Desormeaux [2006] 1 SCR 643
