= Livent =

Theatre production company in Toronto (1989–1999)

The Live Entertainment Corporation of Canada, better known as Livent, was a theatre production company based in Toronto, Ontario. Founded in 1989 by former Cineplex Odeon executives Garth Drabinsky and Myron Gottlieb, the company initially found success with its production of The Phantom of the Opera at its Pantages Theatre in Toronto. In 1993, they brought Kiss of the Spider Woman to Broadway, winning the Tony Award for Best Musical. They became known for lavish productions with their 1994 revival of Show Boat (estimated to be the most expensive production in Broadway history at the time), and their ambitious 1998 original musical Ragtime.

In 1998, Livent announced the discovery of "accounting irregularities". Revised financial statements showed previously undisclosed losses, and the company filed for bankruptcy protection. As a result, the company's stock price plummeted, and its assets were eventually sold off in 1999. The company's collapse led to criminal and civil litigation. An Ontario court found that Drabinsky and Gottlieb had systematically doctored Livent's financial statements, and sentenced them to jail terms of several years for fraud and forgery.

At its height, Livent was the largest live theatre company in North America, and was the first publicly traded company dedicated to live theatre. Livent used Toronto as a testing ground for its pre-Broadway tryouts and has been credited (along with its competitor, Mirvish Productions) with elevating Toronto to the second-most important destination for live theatre in North America, and bringing hundreds of millions of dollars of tourism income to the city.

== Formation ==
The company was founded in 1989 by Garth Drabinsky and Myron Gottlieb, former chairman and vice chairman, respectively, of Cineplex Odeon Corporation. Following an internal struggle within the company, the Drabinsky and Gottlieb purchased its live entertainment division for Can$88 million CAD (borrowing $65m to fund the purchase), spawning an independent business, Live Entertainment of Canada Inc. The name, later shortened to Livent Inc., (Note: Also sometimes given as Live Entertainment Corporation of Canada) was originally intended as a placeholder (based on the fact that the company was formed from the live entertainment division of Cineplex Odeon), but Drabinsky and Gottlieb ultimately kept it. With the purchase they acquired the Pantages Theatre in Toronto (now known as the Ed Mirvish Theatre) and the Canadian rights to the popular musical The Phantom of the Opera.

Livent became a publicly traded company in May 1993 with a stock offering that raised $40 million. This made it the first publicly traded company whose primary business was live theatre.

== Business endeavours ==
Livent pursued a three-pronged business model which Drabinsky referred to as 'reproduction, restoration, and origination':

Reproduction
Acquiring the rights to stage successful current musicals in other markets. Examples included the Toronto production of Phantom of the Opera, and touring productions of Phantom and Joseph and the Amazing Technicolor Dreamcoat
Restoration
Staging revivals of classic shows such as Show Boat
Origination
Funding new shows such as the musicals Kiss of the Spider Woman and Ragtime, and the play Barrymore

In addition, Livent acquired several theatres, beginning in Toronto and expanding to Vancouver, Chicago. Most notably, in 1998, the group built the Ford Center for the Performing Arts in Manhattan, to house the original production of Ragtime on Broadway.

=== Spending and accounting practices ===
Livent became known for its lavish and ambitious productions. Their 1994 revival of Show Boat was speculated to be, at the time, the most expensive production ever on Broadway, with an investment of over US$10 million and ongoing costs of $600,000 per week (a more typical cost for a Broadway revival at the time was around $3 million). Show Boat also became the most expensive show to see on Broadway, with standard orchestra tickets priced at $75 (a price point that other shows eventually followed). Livent was noted for "unprecedented ad blitzes", including frequent full-page ads in the New York Times. The company was also known for paying its actors high salaries, a practice which made it unpopular with other theatre producers (who, unlike Livent, typically negotiated actors' compensation through the League of American Theaters and Producers).

As early as 1994, commentators noted Livent's unusual accounting practices. Livent amortized the pre-production costs of its musicals over a five-year period (as long as the production continued to run), rather than reporting them immediately. This was a legal accounting practice, but aroused suspicion from insiders because it was "unheard of" in the theatre industry. In 1994, Livent kept its Broadway production of Kiss of the Spider Woman open for several months after it had ceased to cover its weekly operating costs. It was widely believed that this was done in order to delay reporting the production's loss on the company's balance sheet, though Drabinsky disputed this.

Industry insiders also noted that Livent did not include advertising costs when reporting the cost of a show, and that they included group sales when reporting ticket sales figures. Both practices were out of step with the norm among Broadway producers.

== Decline and fall ==
On April 13, 1998, Garth Drabinsky stepped down as CEO, and was replaced by Michael Ovitz, former president of the Walt Disney Company, who had spent US$20 million for a controlling stake of Livent. On August 10, Livent announced they had discovered serious 'accounting irregularities', and would need to release revised earnings statements going back to 1996. While the irregularities were being investigated, Drabinsky and Gottlieb were suspended as employees, and trading of Livent's stock temporarily ceased. On November 18, 1998, Livent released corrected financial statements for 1996 through the second quarter of 1998, showing that their debts were greater than their assets. The same day, they filed for US bankruptcy protection in a Manhattan court. The company's stock resumed trading November 20, plummeting to a share price of 50 cents from its previous price of Can$10.15 when trading was halted. In August 1999, Livent's assets were sold off to American company SFX Entertainment for an estimated US$97 million.

== Subsequent events ==
=== Insolvency proceedings ===
In November 1998, Livent sought bankruptcy protection in the US and Canada, claiming a debt of $334 million.

In April 2014, Livent's special receiver obtained judgment against Deloitte & Touche LLP for $84,750,000 in the Ontario Superior Court of Justice, in relation to Deloitte's failure to exercise its duty of care with respect to the audit of Livent's financial statements during 1993–1998. The ruling was upheld by the Ontario Court of Appeal in January 2016, but in December 2017, the Supreme Court of Canada in Deloitte & Touche v Livent Inc (Receiver of) allowed an appeal in part, declaring that liability existed only in respect of Deloitte's negligence in conducting the audit for Livent's 1997 fiscal year, and accordingly reduced the amount of damages awarded to $40,425,000.

=== Criminal proceedings ===
In January 1999, Livent's former chairman Garth Drabinsky and president Myron Gottlieb were indicted in the United States District Court for the Southern District of New York on charges they personally misappropriated $4.6 million in company funds and "cooked the books" to hide enormous losses from investors. Arrest warrants are outstanding with respect to the US criminal proceedings, but double jeopardy rules prevent US extradition proceedings from taking place, because of the conviction in Canadian courts.

On March 25, 2009, Drabinsky and Gottlieb were found guilty of fraud and forgery in Ontario Superior Court for misstating the company's financial statements between 1993 and 1998. On August 5, 2009, Drabinsky and Gottlieb were sentenced to jail terms of seven and six years, respectively.

Drabinsky filed an appeal in the Ontario Court of Appeal with respect to his sentence on September 3, 2009. During that appeal, he remained free on bail. On September 13, 2011, the Court of Appeal, while upholding the convictions, reduced Drabinsky's sentence to 5 years. Drabinsky applied for leave to appeal to the Supreme Court of Canada, and the application was dismissed without costs on March 29, 2012. Drabinsky was originally held at Millhaven Institution for assessment. In December 2011, he was transferred to serve out his sentence at Beaver Creek Institution, a minimum security prison, located in Gravenhurst, Ontario, and was released on day parole in February 2013. Drabinsky was granted full parole on January 20, 2014, and completed his sentence in September 2016.

=== Civil proceedings ===
In 2005, former investors in Livent corporate bonds won a $23.3 million settlement against Drabinsky and Gottlieb in the United States District Court for the Southern District of New York, for which enforcement of the judgment was upheld by the Ontario Court of Appeal in 2008, but the judgment was still unpaid in 2012.

=== Regulatory proceedings ===
In January 1999, Livent reached an administrative settlement with the U.S. Securities and Exchange Commission, while civil and criminal proceedings were simultaneously pursued against Drabinsky, Gottlieb and certain other former Livent employees.

Administrative proceedings were initiated against Livent, Drabinsky and others by the Ontario Securities Commission in 2001, and they were suspended in 2002 until all outstanding criminal proceedings had been completed. In February 2013, the OSC announced that proceedings were to be withdrawn against Livent and another party, and that hearings would take place on March 19, 2013, in the remainder of the matter. Myron Gottlieb and Gordon Eckstein, who were other parties in the proceedings, subsequently entered into settlement agreements with the OSC in September 2014 and May 2015 respectively.

in 2017, the Ontario Securities Commission permanently banned Drabinsky from becoming a director or officer of any public company in Ontario. The OSC also prohibited him from acting as an investment promoter, and banned him from trading securities (other than as a retail investor, for trades within his RRSP or through a registered dealer for accounts in his name only).
