= Dram shop =

Business that serves liquor by the drink

A dram shop (or dramshop) is a bar, tavern or similar commercial establishment where alcoholic beverages are sold. Traditionally, it is a shop where spirits were sold by the dram, a small unit of liquid.

Dram shop liability refers to the body of law governing the liability of taverns, liquor stores, and other commercial establishments that serve alcoholic beverages. Within the United States, laws that impose potential liability upon businesses that sell alcohol for injuries caused by their patrons are usually called dram shop laws or dram shop acts.

Generally, dram shop laws establish the liability of establishments arising out of the sale of alcohol to visibly intoxicated persons or minors who subsequently cause death or injury to third parties (those not having a relationship to the business that sold the alcohol) as a result of alcohol-related car crashes and other accidents.

The laws are intended to protect the general public from the hazards of serving alcohol to minors and intoxicated patrons. Groups such as Mothers Against Drunk Driving (MADD) have advocated for the enforcement and enactment of dram shop laws across the United States as well as in the United Kingdom, Canada, New Zealand and Australia. The earliest dram shop laws date from the 19th-century temperance movement. Grog shop, referring to grog, is an alternate term that was most commonly used in the 19th century.

== United States ==
Serving alcohol to minors is illegal in all 50 states. Many states impose liability on bars for serving minors who subsequently injure themselves or others, to deter bars from serving alcohol to minors. Thus in states like Texas and New Jersey, minors can sue a drinking establishment for their own injuries sustained while intoxicated. In Texas, this also applies to a minor served alcohol at a residential property. In other states, dram shop liability only extends to serving the "habitually intoxicated".

The majority of states allow for recovery when the defendant knew (or should have known) the customer was intoxicated. Some states have attempted to address this problem through more exacting tests. Many states impose liability on social hosts as well as commercial establishments. This related area of the law is known as social host liability.

Different states' dram shop acts also differ as to whether a person who becomes intoxicated and injures themselves has a cause of action against the establishment that served them. Some states, such as New Jersey, will allow such a cause of action but will instruct the jury to take the intoxicated person's own negligence into account. Other states, such as New York, will not allow a person who injures themselves to bring a lawsuit against the bar that served them, but if that person dies will allow such a person's children to sue the drinking establishment for loss of parental consortium.

=== Illinois ===
Under Illinois' dram shop law, plaintiffs can recover after demonstrating that:

1. alcohol was sold to the patron by the defendant;
2. damages were sustained by the plaintiff;
3. the sale of alcohol was the proximate cause of the intoxication; and
4. intoxication was at least one cause of the plaintiff's damages.

Proximate cause includes the requirement that the dram shop must have been able to foresee that its actions could cause injuries to third parties, but this is true for any establishment that serves (sells) alcohol. One Illinois court allowed a lawsuit against a company that dropped off self-serve barrels of beer at a union picnic.

=== Maryland ===
In the state of Maryland there is no dram shop statute.

Maryland only imposes social host liability on adults who knowingly and willfully provide alcohol to minors. Social host liability was recognized by the Maryland Court of Appeals on July 5, 2016, pursuant to ruling that adults should be responsible for the actions of the underage drinkers they host, because those under 21 aren't competent to handle the potentially dangerous effects of alcohol.

=== Massachusetts ===
In Massachusetts, the state's highest court has held that a bar could be sued where a patron exhibiting "drunk, loud and vulgar" behavior was determined to be "visibly intoxicated". In that case, the evidence showed that the intoxicated patron had been served six or more White Russians by a bar. The patron left the bar, arriving at another bar about fifteen minutes later "totally drunk", holding a White Russian. The next bar that he went to refused to serve him. Shortly thereafter, the intoxicated patron lost control of his car, drove on a sidewalk, and killed a pedestrian.

=== Missouri ===
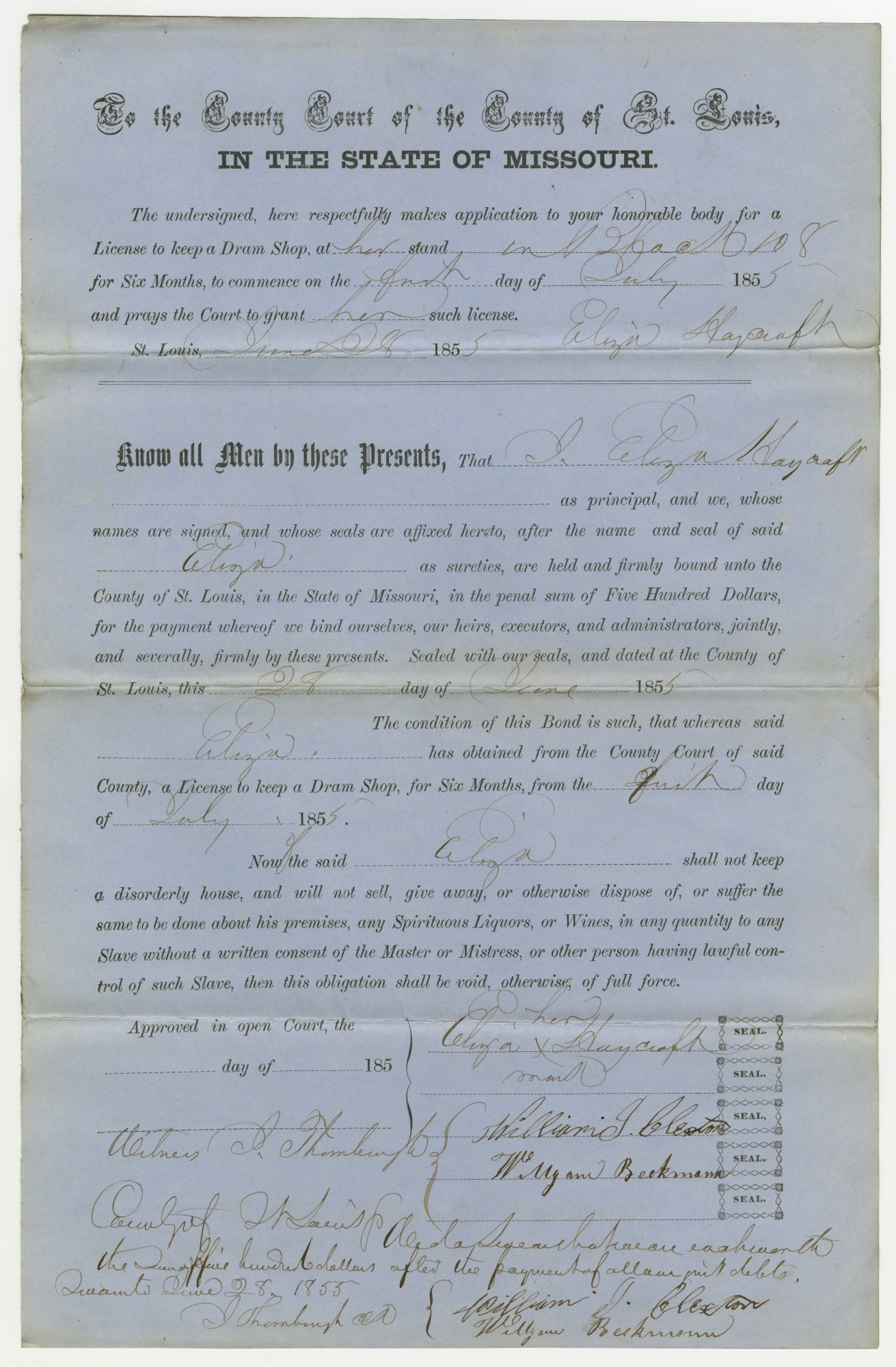
Dram shop license of Eliza Haycraft, June 28, 1855 - DPLA

Missouri's dram shop law requires proof that the party demonstrates "significantly uncoordinated physical action or significant physical dysfunction."

=== New York ===
To recover damages under the New York state dram shop law, a plaintiff must prove the following:

1. the plaintiff suffered injury or damages as the result of the actions of an intoxicated individual,
2. the defendant served alcohol to the intoxicated person who caused the damages or injury, and
3. the defendant, therefore contributed to the further intoxication of the individual.

=== Texas ===
In Texas, a patron must be so obviously intoxicated that he presents a clear danger to himself and others. Dram shops are able to protect themselves from any claims of liability provided they are able to prove that they require all their employees to attend a TABC-approved "seller training program" and that the employee accused of over-serving an intoxicated individual actually attended the program. If these criteria are met, then any plaintiff seeking to sue the dram shop must prove that the employer either directly or indirectly encouraged said employee to violate the Texas Dram Shop Act in order for there to be liability. This dram shop immunity is called "The Safe Harbor".

== Effectiveness ==
A 1993 study from the National Bureau of Economic Research found some reduction in alcohol-related fatalities from the implementation of dram shop laws though it did not control for the special cases of Utah and Nevada, which may have distorted the results. A 2011 survey of eleven studies measuring dram shop acts against alcohol-related harms found strong evidence of the effectiveness of dram shop laws in reducing those harms.
