= Stewart v Pettie =

- Supreme Court of Canada

Hearing: 13 October 1994 Judgment: 26 January 1995
- Full case name: Mayfield Investments Ltd, operating as the Mayfield Inn v Gillian Stewart and Keith Stewart, and Stuart David Pettie
- Citations: [1995] 1 SCR 131
- Docket No.: 23739
- Prior history: APPEAL from Stewart v. Pettie, 1993 ABCA 214 (4 June 1993), overturning Stewart v. Pettie, 1991 CanLII 5918 (10 May 1991)
- Ruling: Appeal allowed; cross-appeal dismissed

Court membership
- Chief Justice: Antonio Lamer; Puisne Justices: Gérard La Forest, Claire L'Heureux-Dubé, John Sopinka, Charles Gonthier, Peter Cory, Beverley McLachlin, Frank Iacobucci, John C. Major

Reasons given
- Unanimous reasons by: Major J
- Lamer CJ and L'Heureux-Dubé J took no part in the consideration or decision of the case.

Stewart v Pettie, [1995] 1 SCR 131 is a leading decision of the Supreme Court of Canada on the duty of care owed by commercial establishments serving liquor.

== Background ==
In December 1985, two couples, Gillian and Keith Stewart and Stuart and Shelley Pettie, went to a dinner theatre in Edmonton. At dinner Stuart Pettie was served a number of rum-and-cokes but showed no signs of intoxication. Afterwards the four discussed who should drive and Pettie insisted he was fit to drive, and so they agreed to let him drive. On the way back Stuart Pettie got them in an accident. Gillian Stewart was rendered quadriplegic; others suffered lesser injuries.

At trial the judge found that the dinner theatre could not have been aware of Stuart's degree of intoxication and did not impose liability based solely on the number of drinks served. On appeal the Court of Appeal overturned the decision and allocated 10% liability to the theatre. The Supreme Court held that the Mayfield investments (owners of the theatre) did not breach the duty that they owed to Gillian Stewart.

== Opinion of the Court ==
Justice Major, writing for the unanimous court, held that the theatre was not liable. Major J. examined the previous cases of Crocker v. Sundance Northwest Resorts Ltd. and Jordan House Ltd. v. Menow, finding that they confirmed the existence of a duty to third parties who are reasonably expected to pose a risk.

A breach of the duty is only where there was a foreseeable risk of harm. Here, there was no reasonable way that the theatre could foresee that Stuart would be the one to drive since he was accompanied by three individuals, two of them sober. The theatre was correct in assuming that Stuart would not be the one to drive. Nevertheless, Major confirmed that the theatre must monitor the patron's alcohol consumption based on the amount served and not solely on the patron's visible condition.

In an obiter dictum, Major mused that even if there was a breach of the standard of care, it was not clear if a warning by Mayfield would have resulted in a different choice of driver.

== See also ==
- Jordan House Hotel Ltd v Menow [1974] S.C.R. 239
- Childs v Desormeaux [2006] 1 SCR 643
- List of Supreme Court of Canada cases (Lamer Court)
