= Letter of recommendation =

Document which assesses a person being recommended

A letter of recommendation or recommendation letter, also known as a letter of reference, reference letter, or simply reference, is a document in which the writer assesses the qualities, characteristics, and capabilities of the person being recommended in terms of that individual's ability to perform a particular task or function. Letters of recommendation are typically related to employment (such a letter may also be called an employment reference or job reference), admission to institutions of higher education, or scholarship eligibility. They are usually written by someone who worked with or taught the person, such as a supervisor, colleague, or teacher. Financial institutions, such as banks, may ask other institutions for references to judge, for example, a potential customer's creditworthiness.

References may also be required of companies seeking to win contracts, particularly in the fields of engineering, consultancy, manufacturing, and construction, and with regard to public procurement and tenders, to assess their ability to deliver the required level of service.

== History ==
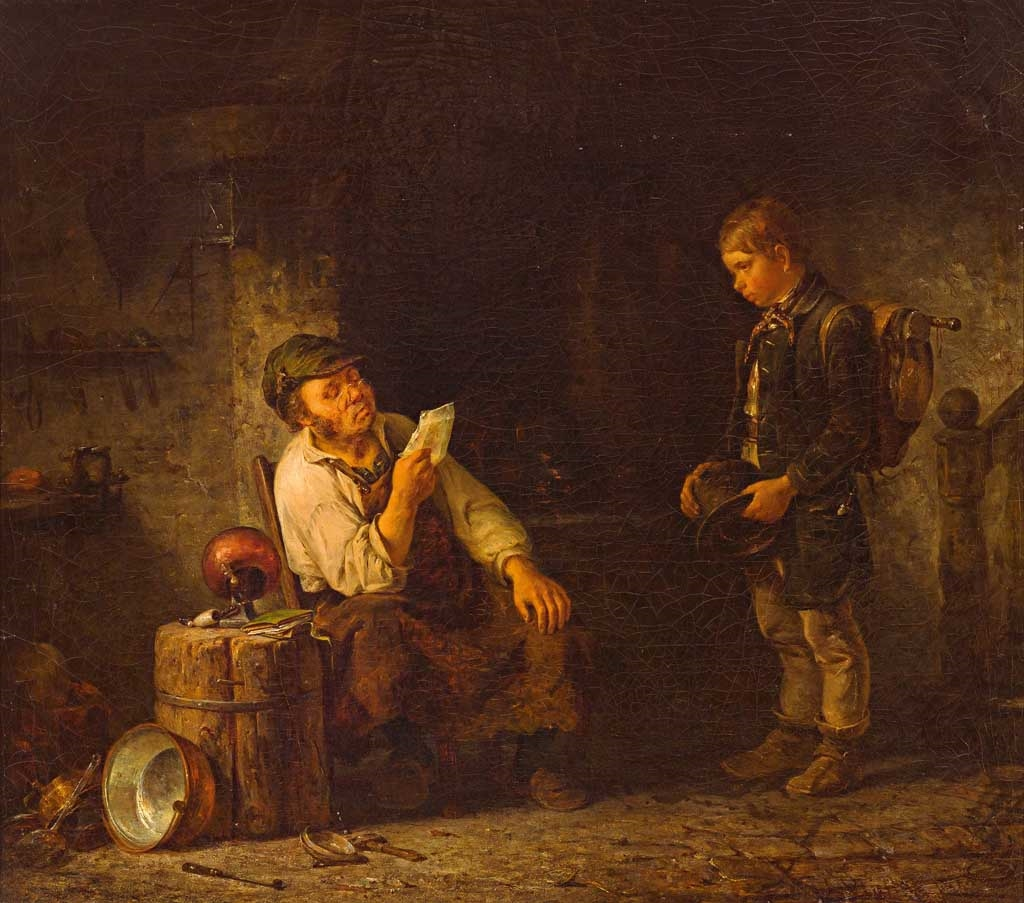
"Assistant with letter of recommendation introduces himself to the coppersmith", by August Heinrich Plinke, 19th century

Letters of recommendation have a long history: for example in the New Testament, Saint Paul discusses whether he needs a letter of recommendation to commend his ministry to the church in Corinth.

== Referee ==
The person providing a reference is called a referee. An employment reference letter is usually written by a former employer or manager, but references can also be requested from co-workers, customers, and vendors. Teachers and professors often supply references for former students. Reference letters for organizations are usually supplied by parties to which the company has provided similar services in the past.

Reference letters for students are usually written by a former teacher or professor.

== Content ==
The employment reference letter can cover topics such as:

- the employee's tasks and responsibilities
- the duration of employment or tasks/ responsibilities
- the position relative to the author of the reference letter
- the employee's abilities, knowledge, creativity, intelligence
- the employee's qualifications (foreign languages, special skills)
- the employee's social attitude
- the employee's power of rapport
- reason(s) of employment termination
- some text with the actual recommendation itself (e.g. 'I unequivocally recommend ... [name] as a ... [function/role] and would be happy to hire him/ her again').

== Language ==
In some countries, elements of performance are evaluated using established forms of expression, sometimes euphemistic. For example, in the German-language Arbeitszeugnis, the following terms are frequently used:

- Excellent = stets zu unserer vollsten Zufriedenheit erledigt (always done to our complete satisfaction)
- Good = stets zu unserer vollen Zufriedenheit (always to our full satisfaction)
- Satisfactory = zu unserer vollen Zufriedenheit (to our full satisfaction)
- Adequate = zu unserer Zufriedenheit (to our satisfaction)
- Poor = hat sich bemüht, den Anforderungen gerecht zu werden (has endeavored to meet the demands)

This language established itself as an unwritten code in the employment world. Its purpose was to give even weakly performing employees a letter of recommendation that does not sound negative. However, the euphemistically glazed-over descriptions are now codified and generally known, so that the original cryptic intent is no longer served. Nonetheless, it is still standard to use this codified language.

== Recipient of the letter ==
Depending on context and issuer, letters can be either:

- specifically requested to be written about someone, and therefore addressed to a particular requester (such as a new employer, university admissions officer)
- or may be issued to the person being recommended without specifying an addressee

For example, a German Arbeitszeugnis is usually issued automatically to a leaving employee, and is therefore not addressed to a particular requester. A letter of recommendation for a university of college in the US is usually written for and addressed to a specific institution the student wants to apply to.

If the letter is addressed to a particular requester, the letter will often be sent directly to that requester, and not to the applicant. In that case, applicants usually have the right to view a copy of the letter. Some applications, such as professional schools, give applicants the choice to waive their right to view their letters. Usually, applicants are encouraged to waive their rights because if they do not, it is a sign they are not confident in their recommenders.

== Checking of references ==
Most potential employers will contact referees to obtain references before offering a job to a new employee. A survey by the Society for Human Resource Management (SHRM) found that eight out of ten resource professionals said they regularly conduct reference checks for professional (89%), executive (85%), administrative (84%) and technical (81%) positions. Candidates are advised to ensure that they provide a suitable list of referees to their new prospective employer or institution, and to contact those referees to ensure that they are able and willing to provide a suitable reference. In some cases, employers will contact a candidate's former company for a reference even if no contact is supplied by the candidate.

== Duty to provide a reference ==
Some employers may not be willing to provide reference letters because they may be concerned about potential lawsuits. In this case, the employer may only provide the job title, dates of employment, and salary history. Finland, Germany, Austria, Switzerland, Hungary and Bulgaria are the only countries in Europe where employees can legally claim an employment reference, including the right to a correct, unambiguous, and benevolent appraisal.

While there is no common law duty to provide a reference, the Supreme Court of Canada has held that a refusal to do so may constitute "conduct that is unfair or is in bad faith" with respect to a wrongful dismissal, and thus "indicative of the type of conduct that ought to merit compensation by way of an addition to the notice period." There is a duty of care to ensure that, where one is provided, it is accurate and fair and not give a misleading impression, as held by the House of Lords in Spring v Guardian Assurance plc. If an employer goes beyond what a reference should contain, or if it gives inaccurate or misleading information, liability may arise in the areas of breach of statutory duty, negligent misstatement, deceit, defamation or malicious falsehood. It does not matter what form the reference might take.

In the United Kingdom, references received by an employer from another person or organization can be disclosed to the person about whom they are written under the subject access provisions of the Data Protection Act 1998, but certain confidentiality considerations apply as to the identity of the person giving the reference. As a result, together with the duty of care under Spring, many organizations have issued guidance as to best practice to be undertaken by reference providers.

The duty of care has also been held to apply in non-reference situations, as noted in 2011 in McKie v Swindon College. In another case, the Court of Appeal of England and Wales has held that "a reference must not give an unfair or misleading impression overall, even if its discrete components are factually correct." However, while a reference must be accurate and fair, it is not necessary to report all material facts concerning an individual, but it can be argued that, if an agreed reference arising from a settlement agreement is misleadingly incomplete, the employer can be sued by a subsequent employer for breaching its duty of care. The Employment Appeal Tribunal, in an unfair dismissal case, ruled that, in preparing a reference, it was not reasonable to provide details of complaints against an employee of which the employee was not aware.

The Court of Appeal has further held that, if an employee leaves when an investigation is ongoing but has not been concluded, or where issues arise after an employee leaves that have not been investigated, employers can disclose this information but should do so in a measured and fair way, which will be particularly important if to omit this information would mean providing a misleading reference.

In 2014, the UK government's Crown Commercial Service issued an information note clarifying that government departments are permitted to issue references relating to suppliers, and that failure to do so, reflecting a belief that policy matters prevented references from being issued, could have a detrimental effect on companies' development, especially small and medium sized enterprises. The information note emphasized the importance of references being based on evidence and contemporaneous records, related to a specific proposed contract for which a reference has been requested, and issued by a member of staff formally authorized to speak for the organization providing the reference.

In 2016, the Financial Conduct Authority and the Prudential Regulation Authority are issuing rules that will require the furnishing of references, before any approval or certification may be given by them, as well as specifying the information that they must contain.

== Relieving letters in India ==
In India, employees typically receive a relieving letter (also called an experience certificate or service certificate) from their employer when leaving a job. While the relieving letter may also serve as a letter of recommendation, the specific purpose of the relieving letter is to prove to any new employer that the applicant properly resigned from their old job and fulfilled all obligations to the former employer, such as working the notice period.

Generally, employers are legally required to provide a relieving letter to leaving employees. In Kerala, for example, this is regulated in the Kerala Shops and Commercial Establishments Bill Despite this, employers will sometimes deny or delay providing a relieving letter, which makes it difficult for a leaving employee to start a new job.

== See also ==
- Character witness

== Bibliography ==
- Karl-Heinz List: Das zeitgemäße Arbeitszeugnis. Ein Handbuch für Zeugnisaussteller. 3. Auflage. BW Bildung und Wissen Verlag, Nürnberg 2008, ISBN 978-3-8214-7676-6.
- Hein Schleßmann: Das Arbeitszeugnis. Zeugnisrecht, Zeugnissprache, Bausteine, Muster. 18. Auflage. Verlag Recht und Wirtschaft, Frankfurt am Main 2007, ISBN 978-3-8005-3083-0.
- Volker Stück: Das Arbeitszeugnis. In: Monatsschrift für Deutsches Recht. 60. Jg., Bd. 2, 2006, S. 791–799.
- Arnulf Weuster, Brigitte Scheer: Arbeitszeugnisse in Textbausteinen. Rationelle Erstellung, Analyse, Rechtsfragen. 11. Auflage. Richard Boorberg Verlag, Stuttgart, München, Hannover, Berlin, Weimar, Dresden 2007, ISBN 978-3-415-03862-2.
- Gowe, Gregory T. (May 2006). "Reference Letters" (PDF). greggowe.com. Vancouver: Lawson Lundell LLP.
