= Spandeck Engineering v Defence Science and Technology Agency =

Landmark case in Singapore tort law

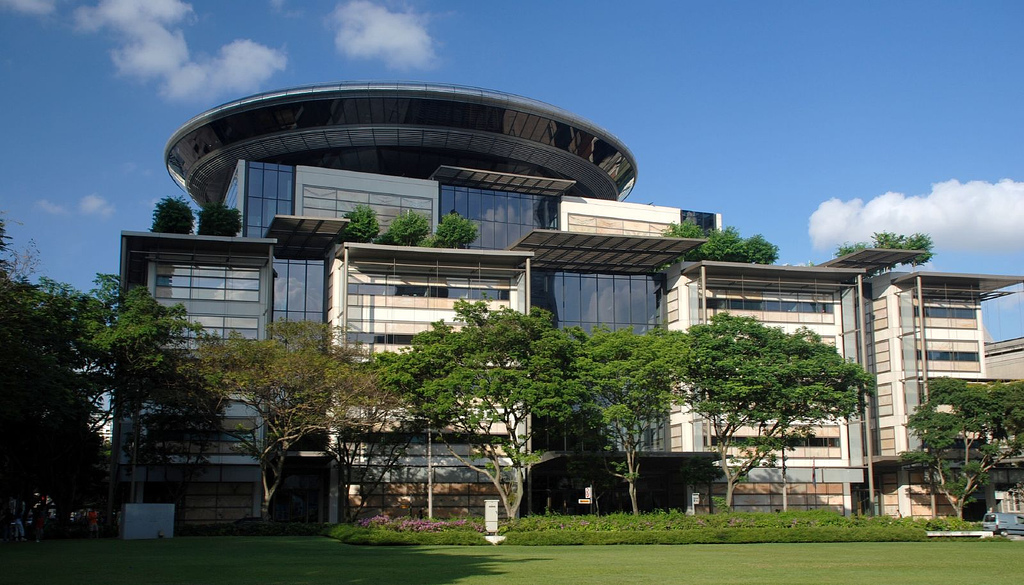
- Court: Court of Appeal of Singapore
- Full case name: Spandeck Engineering (S) Pte Ltd v Defence Science & Technology Agency
- Decided: 8 Aug 2007
- Citations: [2007] 4 SLR (R) 100; [2007] SGCA 37
- Legislation cited: Defence Science and Technology Agency Act (Cap 75A, 2001 Rev Ed)

Holding
- The test to determine the imposition of a duty of care was a two-stage test comprising first, proximity and second, policy considerations, which were together preceded by the threshold question of factual foreseeability. The first stage of proximity required sufficient legal proximity between the claimant and defendant for a duty of care to arise. The focus was on the closeness of the relationship between the parties, including physical, circumstantial and causal proximity, supported by the twin criteria of voluntary assumption of responsibility and reliance. If a positive answer to the threshold question of factual foreseeability and the first stage of proximity was assumed, a prima facie duty of care arose. Policy considerations, such as the presence of a contractual matrix which clearly defined the rights and liabilities of the parties and their relative bargaining positions, then arose and were applied to the factual matrix to determine whether or not to negate this prima facie duty.

Court membership
- Judges sitting: Chan Sek Keong; Andrew Phang; V K Rajah

Case opinions
- A duty of care can be established through a two-stage test. First, a prime facie duty of care arises when there is proximity. Two, the prima facie duty can be negated from policy considerations. A threshold of foreseeability exists for the test to be applied.

Keywords
- Duty of care; Negligence; Tort

Spandeck Engineering v Defence Science and Technology Agency [2007] SGCA 37 was a landmark decision in Singapore law. It established a new framework for establishing a duty of care, differentiating the Singaporean law of tort from past English common law precedent such as Caparo v Dickman and Anns v Merton, whilst also allowing for claims in pure economic loss, which are generally not allowed in English law.

== Background ==
An early framework for the establishment of a duty of care was outlined in Donoghue v Stevenson [1932] UKHL 100, which outlines the neighbourhood principle of care:

You must take reasonable care to avoid acts or omissions which you can reasonably foresee would be likely to injure your neighbour. Who, then, in law, is my neighbour? The answer seems to be – persons who are so closely and directly affected by my act that I ought reasonably to have them in contemplation as being so affected when I am directing my mind to the acts or omissions which are called in question.

This principle was revised into a two-stage test outlined in Anns v Merton London Borough Council [1977] UKHL 4, which stated that a prima facie duty of care arose when there was proximity between two parties such that careless acts on the part of one party could be reasonably foreseen to cause harm to the contrasting party. Anns v Merton was later overturned in Murphy v Brentwood District Council [1991] UKHL 2, and a new, three-stage test was outlined in Caparo Industries PLC v Dickman [1990] UKHL 2.

The Application of English Law Act of 1993 binds some English common law judgments in Singapore courts, but the Singapore judiciary has final jurisdiction over the application and interpretation of the law. Spandeck v DSTA was a departure from the English common law framework for establishing duties of care, replacing Caparo's three-stage test with its own two-stage test distinct from the one in Anns v Merton.

== Facts ==
The Defence Science and Technology Agency (DSTA), a statutory board of the Singapore government, engaged Spandeck Engineering on a contractual basis to work on a construction project. As per statute, DSTA provided a supervisory officer to pay Spandeck according to the terms of contract. Spandeck had underestimated the costs required for the project and subsequent payments to sub-contractors, which went over-budget, were not certified by DSTA. Spandeck was unable to pay its own contractors with the money that it was given, and negotiations were conducted to revise the contract. These negotiations fell through, and Spandeck decided instead to novate its contract to a third-party, thereby forfeiting a right to arbitration under an arbitration clause. After, Spandeck sued DSTA for damages, alleging that it had a "duty of care ... in certifying, in a fair and unbiased manner, payment for work... to avoid causing it any loss due to undervaluation and under-certification of works".

== Judgment ==
The Court of Appeal ruled that for a duty of care to be owed, a two-stage test can be applied, comprising proximity and policy. In determining legal proximity, the court considered two formulations: Justice Deane's formulation in Sutherland Shire Council v Heyman comprising physical, circumstantial, and causal proximity; and the "twin criteria" of voluntary assumption of responsibility and reliance outlined in Hedley Byrne. They regarded these formulations, quoting Andrew Phang, as "two different... sides of the same coin and ought therefore to be viewed in an integrated and holistic fashion." Policy considerations allowed the court to negate a prima facie duty of care, "involving value judgments which reflect differential weighing and balancing of competing moral claims and broad social welfare goals."

Such a test could be applied regardless of what kinds of damages the case involved, and it was intended to be applied in determining a duty of care in any situation, regardless of the kind of loss involved. In establishing the test, the court rejected a categorisational approach towards cases of negligence, instead emphasising common law incrementalism within the two-stage test:

Ultimately, a single test to determine the existence of a duty of care for all claims of negligence would do well to eliminate the perception that there are, at once, two or more tests which are equally applicable. While it may be that these tests could yield the same result, their serial applicability diminishes the desirability of having a general principle that can provide a coherent, consistent and reliable way of determining or recognising a duty of care.

In addition, a threshold of foreseeability must be met for the test to be applied. Objective foreseeability was not classified as a stage in the test outlined, with the reasoning that "it would be fulfilled in almost all cases" and would be "too wide a criterion to be effective as a legal control mechanism". Additionally, the court ruled that claims in pure economic loss were allowed in Singapore, diverging from English case law as outlined in Murphy v Brentwood DC. Chief justice Chan Sek Keong, in delivering the court's judgment, stated:

We respectfully agree that there is no justification for a general exclusionary rule against recovery of all economic losses and indeed, this is already the position the Singapore courts have taken, following Ocean Front... Although the Singapore decisions on pure economic loss have largely been restriction to such situations [concerning the economic value of land in near-contractual relationships], there is no reason not to extend liability for pure economic loss to other situations, provided the issues of indeterminate liability and policy can be adequately dealt with.

With regard to the present case, whilst the court found foreseeability, it found that proximity did not exist between Spandeck and DSTA, owing to the arbitration clause in contract. Quoting the previous judgment of Pacific Associates, the court affirmed that:

[I]t would not be reasonable [for the court in Pacific Associates] to impose a Hedley Byrne duty... because "it would cut across and be inconsistent with the structure of relationships created by the contracts, into which the parties had entered... The court in Pacific Associates also held that the engineer did not owe a duty of care to a contractor who had suffered economic loss... as the contractor was safeguarded by the terms of its contract with the employer. Purchas LJ considered that the courts should be slow to superimpose an added duty of care in excess of the rights the contractor was content to acquire... [I]f the contractor required extra-contractual protection for the defaults of the engineer, it was open to the contractor to stipulate for it when contracting. By accepting the invitation to tender the contractor must be taken to accept the role to be played by the engineer as defined in the contract.

== Analysis and Development ==
Spandeck laid a universal foundation of establishing a duty of care in Singapore law, and subsequent cases relied upon its framework to determine duties. This framework is different from that in Caparo in that Caparo advocated for an incrementalist approach in determining duty of care, where categories of duties are established based on cases, and duties are determined based on similarities to past cases. Spandeck, on the other hand, asserted a universal test that was independent of past decisions, using precedent as an aid in determining duty. Spandeck also differed from the framework found in Anns, which affirmed a universal test that can determine a duty of care wholly independent of individual considerations.

Spandeck's formulation has been criticised by some academics for its emphasis on proximity, which the courts of some jurisdictions have disregarded as the limb for establishing a prima facie duty of care. Colin Liew, a professor at the National University of Singapore, has criticised Spandeck's as giving rise to "conceptual, analytical and methodological uncertainties" and has argued for a re-examination of the definition of duty of care. In regard to criticism of proximity as a concept, Chan CJ in Spandeck stated:

If indeed the "proximity" concept is merely a label or artificial exercise in judicial creativity, then one must ask why the concept is still resorted to or utilised in the various tests. Its very presence suggests that it has some substantive content that is capable of being expressed in terms of legal principles. Rather than denouncing it as a mere "label", the courts should strive to infuse some meaning into it, if only so that lawyers who advise litigants and even law teachers can make some sense of the judicial formulations.

The test was later applied by the court of appeal in the context of psychiatric injury in another landmark case, Ngiam Kong Seng v Lim Chiew Hock [2008] SGCA 23.

== See also ==
- Donoghue v Stevenson
- English tort law
