= Animal Concerns Research and Education Society =

Singaporean NGO and animal welfare charity

- Founded: 2001
- Type: Non-governmental organisation, charity
- Registration no.: T01SS0121K
- Region served: Singapore
- Key people: Louis Ng, Founder and Former CEO; Anbarasi Boopal, Former Co CEO; Kalaivanan Balakrishnan, Current CEO
- Website: acres.org.sg

Animal Concerns Research and Education Society (ACRES) is a non-governmental organisation and a registered animal welfare charity with the Ministry of Culture, Community and Youth (MCCY) in Singapore. It aims to raise awareness of animal welfare issues, adopts animal research projects and their findings for public outreach and education, and partners with authorities and related parties.

== History ==
The organization was founded in 2001 by Louis Ng when he was still a National University of Singapore undergraduate. He began full-time work at ACRES upon his graduation in 2002.

In 2004, ACRES sent Blue, a vervet monkey, back to Zambia, and in 2006, Asha, a rhesus macaque, back to India.

ACRES engaged A.n.A Contractor Pte Ltd in constructing an animal shelter which subsequently employed Tan Boon Kwee, a director of the company, to supervise the construction of the site. Construction started in January 2007. Originally, the site was to be constructed by levelling the soil on the site; however, under Tan's supervision, soil from another site was brought in instead, resulting in severe soil pollution. In 2008, at the court of first instance (the Singapore High Court), ACRES sued A.n.A for breach of contract and Tan for negligence in supervising the work. The court allowed the claim for breach of contract but not in negligence. ACRES appeals to the Singapore Court of Appeal on the claim in negligence. ACRES then appealed to the Singapore Court of Appeal, ACRES v Tan Boon Kwee, alleging that Tan had polluted land. The court ruled in favour of ACRES, awarding over $25 million in damages; however, the majority was not recovered due to Tan's inability to pay.

In November 2013, ACRES opened a wildlife sanctuary at their Wildlife Rescue Centre to house animals, including tortoises, turtles and iguanas, that were rescued from illegal wildlife trade. As of February 2017, ACRES has more than 100 wild animals waiting to be sent back into the wild in their native countries.

On 2 February 2017, Rahayu, a Malaysian giant turtle, was sent back to Malaysia after more than a year of negotiations with the Malaysian wildlife authorities. It was later the first reptile to be successfully released back into the wild.

On 16 April 2018, six rescued reptiles, four giant Asian turtles, and two elongated tortoises were sent back to Malaysia, as ACRES' first mass repatriation.
