= Anns/Kamloops test =

The Anns/Kamloops test is a criterion in Canadian law for determining whether a plaintiff in a civil suit may make a claim in tort for pure economic loss. The first part refers to the decision of the House of Lords in Anns v Merton LBC, which established a broad test for determining the existence of a duty of care in the tort of negligence. The second part refers to the decision of the Supreme Court of Canada in Kamloops (City of) v Nielsen, which provided further clarification.
