= Criminal Attempts Act 1981 =

Act of the Parliament of the United Kingdom

Criminal Attempts Act 1981 (Note: Section 12.)
- Act of Parliament
- Parliament of the United Kingdom
- Long title: An Act to amend the law of England and Wales as to attempts to commit offences and as to cases of conspiring to commit offences which, in the circumstances, cannot be committed; to repeal the provisions of section 4 of the Vagrancy Act 1824 which apply to suspected persons and reputed thieves; to make provision against unauthorised interference with vehicles; and for connected purposes.
- Citation: 1981 c. 47
- Territorial extent: England and Wales (Note: Section 11(2).)

Dates
- Royal assent: 27 July 1981
- Commencement: 27 August 1981 (Note: Section 11(1).)

Other legislation
- Amends: Vagrancy Act 1824; Prevention of Crimes Act 1871; Penal Servitude Act 1891; Perjury Act 1911; Army Act 1955; Air Force Act 1955; Sexual Offences Act 1956; Naval Discipline Act 1957; Criminal Law Act 1967; Sexual Offences Act 1967; Firearms Act 1968; Misuse of Drugs Act 1971; Powers of Criminal Courts Act 1973; Criminal Law Act 1977; Magistrates' Courts Act 1980
- Amended by: Criminal Justice Act 1982; Police and Criminal Evidence Act 1984; Road Traffic (Consequential Provisions) Act 1988; Computer Misuse Act 1990; Criminal Justice Act 1993; Sexual Offences Act 2003; Criminal Justice Act 2003; Coroners and Justice Act 2009; Anti-social Behaviour, Crime and Policing Act 2014; Sentencing Act 2020; Online Safety Act 2023

Status: Amended

Text of statute as originally enacted

Revised text of statute as amended

Text of the Criminal Attempts Act 1981 as in force today (including any amendments) within the United Kingdom, from legislation.gov.uk.

The Criminal Attempts Act 1981 (c. 47) is an act of the Parliament of the United Kingdom. It applies to England and Wales and creates criminal offences pertaining to attempting to commit crimes. It abolished the common law offence of attempt.

== Provisions ==
=== Attempting to commit an offence ===
Section 1(1) of the act creates the offence of attempt:

(1) If, with intent to commit an offence to which this section applies, a person does an act which is more than merely preparatory to the commission of the offence, he is guilty of attempting to commit the offence.

Section 1 applies to any indictable offence triable in England and Wales, except conspiracy, aiding and abetting, and offences under sections 4 and 5 of the Criminal Law Act 1967 (which deal with assisting offenders and concealing information about crimes).

Section 1(2) reads:

(2) A person may be guilty of attempting to commit an offence to which this section applies even though the facts are such that the commission of the offence is impossible.

Section 1(3) states that a person is to be judged according to what the defendant thought the facts of the case were at the time of the attempt, rather than what the facts really were, in the event that the defendant was mistaken about what was happening.

Section 2 states that rules regarding time limits for prosecuting, powers of arrest and search, and so on, are the same for offences of attempting to commit an offence as they are for the offence attempted.

Section 3 provides that where another Act creates an offence of attempting to commit an offence under that Act, similar rules apply to that offence as the rules in section 1 (unless the other Act specifically says otherwise).

Section 4 generally sets the penalties for attempting to commit an offence as the same as the offence attempted. The only exception today is murder, which carries a mandatory sentence of life imprisonment, whereas section 4 makes the sentence for attempted murder discretionary (up to a maximum of life imprisonment).

Historically, offences under the Sexual Offences Act 1956 (repealed in 2004) were exempt from section 4, and attempts to commit sexual offences sometimes carried lower sentences than the completed offence. For example, rape was punishable with life imprisonment, but attempted rape carried a maximum of seven years, until the 1956 Act was amended by the Sexual Offences Act 1985.

=== Other offences ===
The Act abolished the offence of "loitering with intent" under the Vagrancy Act 1824.

Section 9 creates a summary offence called "vehicle interference." This is committed by interfering with a motor vehicle or trailer, or anything in the vehicle or trailer, with intent to steal it or anything in it. It carries a maximum sentence of three months.

== Case law ==
- Anderton v Ryan [1985] AC 560
- R v Shivpuri [1987] AC 1
