= Cooper v Hobart =

- Supreme Court of Canada

Hearing: June 20, 2001 Judgment: November 16, 2001
- Full case name: Mary Francis Cooper v. Robert J. Hobart and Her Majesty the Queen in right of the Province of British Columbia
- Citations: 2001 SCC 79, [2001] 3 SCR 537
- Docket No.: 27880
- Ruling: Appeal dismissed

Holding
- A Registrar does not owe a duty of care to investors

Court membership
- Chief Justice: Beverley McLachlin; Puisne Justices: Claire L'Heureux-Dubé, Charles Gonthier, Frank Iacobucci, John C. Major, Michel Bastarache, Ian Binnie, Louise Arbour, Louis LeBel

Reasons given
- Unanimous reasons by: McLachlin CJ and Major J
- L'Heureux-Dubé and Iacobucci JJ took no part in the consideration or decision of the case.

Cooper v Hobart [2001] 3 S.C.R. 537, 2001 SCC 79 is a Supreme Court of Canada case that redefined the "Anns/Kamloops test", which was adopted in Kamloops (City of) v Nielsen to establish a duty of care in civil tort cases.

== Background ==
Eron was a mortgage broker licensed under the Mortgage Broker's Act. Cooper advanced money to Eron. Hobart, acting in his official capacity as Mortgage Broker Registrar, suspended Eron's license under the Act.

Cooper alleged that Hobart breached a duty of care that he allegedly owed to her and other investors because he had been aware of the serious violations of the Act committed by Eron and did not suspend his license soon enough. The Registrar of Mortgage Brokers had become aware of Eron in August 1996 and did not suspend his license until October 1997.

At trial, the Registrar was found to have owed a duty of care to the investors. On appeal, the Court overturned the verdict on grounds that there was insufficient proximity.

== Reasoning of the Court ==
McLachlin CJ and Major J found that if there is no existing category that would create a duty of care, the plaintiff must show proximity, a close and direct relationship with the defendant. In this case, there was no such proximity because the statute governing the Registrar imposed no such duty. While the losses to the plaintiff were foreseeable, proceeding to a policy analysis was unnecessary.

The Court noted that even if it had gone to a policy analysis, the duty of care would be negated by policy considerations as a ruling for the plaintiff would in effect create a public insurer for investors on taxpayer dollars.

== Aftermath and precedence ==
This case concerns pure economic loss. It is a purported application of the Anns/Kamloops test, however it actually adopts a new standard.

== See also ==
- List of Supreme Court of Canada cases (McLachlin Court)
