= Kamloops (City of) v Nielsen =

- Supreme Court of Canada

Hearing: November 22, 1982 Judgment: July 26, 1984
- Full case name: City of Kamloops v Jan Clemmensen Nielsen, Wesley Joseph Hughes and Gladys Annetta Hughes
- Citations: [1984] 2 SCR 2
- Ruling: Kamloops appeal dismissed.

Court membership
- Chief Justice: Bora Laskin; Puisne Justices: Roland Ritchie, Brian Dickson, Jean Beetz, Willard Estey, William McIntyre, Julien Chouinard, Antonio Lamer, Bertha Wilson

Reasons given
- Majority: Wilson J, joined by Ritchie and Dickson JJ
- Dissent: McIntyre J, joined by Estey J

Kamloops (City of) v Nielsen, [1984] 2 SCR 2 ("Kamloops") is a leading Supreme Court of Canada decision setting forth the criteria that must be met for a plaintiff to make a claim in tort for pure economic loss. In that regard, the Kamloops case is significant because the Supreme Court adopted the "proximity" test set out in the House of Lords decision, Anns v Merton LBC. Kamloops is also significant as it articulates the "discoverability principle" in which the commencement of a limitation period is delayed until the plaintiff becomes aware of the material facts on which a cause of action are discovered or ought to have been discovered by the plaintiff in the exercise of reasonable diligence. This was later adopted and refined in Central Trust Co v Rafuse. Finally, Kamloops develops the law governing circumstances where a plaintiff can sue the government in tort.

== Facts ==
A house in Kamloops, British Columbia, had insufficient foundations, which were discovered upon inspection by the city. Stop work orders were issued but not enforced. The house was sold to the Nielsens. On discovering the construction deficiencies, the Nielsens sued the city for negligent performance of inspection. The vendor of the house, Hughes, assumed liability as well. Seventy-five percent of the liability was delegated to Hughes, and twenty-five percent was delegated to the city.

== Issues ==
Under statute, the city had a discretion whether to inspect construction. The city argued that it could not be liable for exercising that discretion. The statute also fixed a limitation period in which a plaintiff could sue the city, and the city argued the limitation period had expired. Finally, the city argued that the damages sought were considered to be "pure economic loss," which at law were generally not recoverable.

== Results ==
The exercise of the statutory discretion granted to the city to inspect was a policy decision. A plaintiff cannot sue government for a policy decision. However, once the city chose to inspect, the enforcement of that inspection was an operational decision, which could give rise to a duty of care. On a breach of that duty of care, a plaintiff could sue. The court concluded that the city breached its duty of care by negligently enforcing inspection.

The court concluded that the limitation period had not expired when the action was started. While the lawsuit had commenced after the limitation period, if measured from the time the city failed to properly inspect. The court held that the commencement of a limitation period was delayed until the material facts on which a claim is based have been discovered or ought to have been discovered by the plaintiff by the exercise of reasonable diligence. This principle is later refined by the Supreme Court in Central Trust Co v Rafuse.

Finally, the court held that the plaintiffs could recover its loss despite its categorization as "pure economic loss". The Supreme Court adopted the Anns test (from Anns v Merton LBC), which allows a claim in tort for economic loss when:

a. there is a sufficiently close relationship between the parties so that in the reasonable contemplation of the defendant, carelessness on its part could cause damages to the plaintiff; and

b. there are no considerations that should serve to limit or negate the scope of the duty, the class of persons to which it is owed, or the damages to which a breach of the duty would give rise.

Since its decision in Kamloops, the Supreme Court has enumerated five categories of compensable economic loss, originating in Canadian National Railway Co v Norsk Pacific Steamship Co, While the categories are not closed, those that have been identified to date are:

a. The Independent Liability of Statutory Public Authorities;
b. Negligent Misrepresentation;
c. Negligent Performance of a Service;
d. Negligent Supply of Goods or Structures;
e. Relational Economic Loss.

Anns has since been overturned in the United Kingdom, but on a number of occasions, the Supreme Court has reaffirmed the Anns test in Canada, including in Dobson (Litigation Guardian of) v Dobson and Cooper v Hobart.

== See also ==
- List of Supreme Court of Canada cases (Dickson Court)
