= Murphy v Brentwood DC =

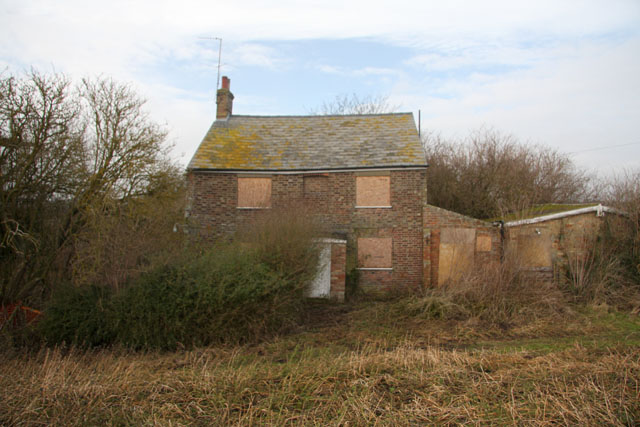
- Court: House of Lords
- Decided: 26 July 1990
- Citations: [1991] UKHL 2; [1991] 1 AC 398; [1990] 2 All ER 908
- Transcript: House of Lords transcript

Court membership
- Judges sitting: Lord Mackay, the Lord Chancellor; Lord Keith; Lord Bridge; Lord Brandon; Lord Ackner; Lord Oliver; Lord Jauncey

Laws applied
- This case overturned a previous ruling
- Anns v Merton London Borough Council [1978]

Keywords
- duty of care, physical damage, pure economic loss

Murphy v Brentwood District Council [1991] UKHL 2, [1991] 1 AC 398 was a judicial decision of the House of Lords in relation to recovery for pure economic loss in tort.

The court overruled the decision Anns v Merton London Borough Council with respect to a duty of care in English law.

== Facts ==
A builder failed to build proper foundations to a house. The defendant local authority, approving the building for its building regulations, failed to recognise the problem. When the building became dangerously unstable, the claimant was unable to raise any money for repairs, chose not to sue anyone at that stage and therefore had to sell the house at a considerable loss. He sought to recover his loss from Brentwood District Council, but the action failed as the loss, the deflated value he obtained for the house, was classed as a pure economic loss.

== Judgment ==
The House of Lords overruled (Note: Since the 1966 Practice Statement, the House of Lords has been able to depart from its own precedent to achieve justice.) Anns and held that the council was not liable in the absence of physical injury. (Note: As the case concerned economic loss, not personal injury, the House of Lord's statement on that point is obiter dicta.) Also, the case of Dutton v Bognor Regis UDC was disapproved.

The judgment was rejected in some Commonwealth jurisdictions, notably Canada, Australia, Singapore and New Zealand, all of which have preferred the two-stage Anns test of proximity and policy.

== Reflection ==
Just as in the Anns case, building regulations are part of the bylaws of the local council and require that notice should be given to the council both at the commencement of the work and at specific stages, such as when the foundation trenches were ready to be poured. Councils have the powers to inspect the foundations and to require any corrections necessary to bring the work into conformity with the bylaws, but they are not under an obligation to do so. In Anns, the House of Lords considered whether the local council were under any duty of care toward owners or occupiers of houses as regards inspection during the building process and unanimously decided that a duty of care existed and that was not barred by a "limitation of actions" statute.
