= Anns v Merton LBC =

United Kingdom legal case

Anns v Merton London Borough Council
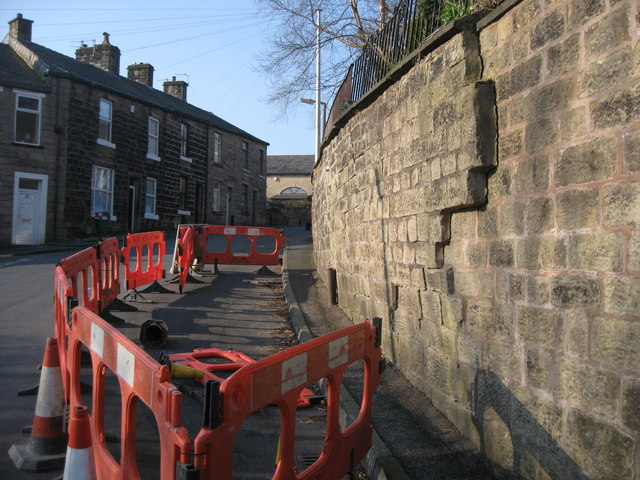
- Court: House of Lords
- Full case name: Anns and others v London Borough of Merton
- Decided: 12 May 1977
- Citations: [1977] UKHL 4 [1978] AC 728 [1977] 2 All ER 492 [1977] 2 WLR 1024

Case history
- Prior action: Judgment for defendant at first hearing on the basis that the plaintiffs were statute barred.

Court membership
- Judges sitting: Lord Wilberforce; Lord Diplock; Lord Simon; Lord Salmon; Lord Russell

Case opinions
- Established the two-stage Anns test whether a duty of care existed which requires: a 'sufficient relationship of proximity based upon foreseeability' between plaintiff and defendant; and considerations of reasons that there should not be a duty of care.
- Decision by: Lord Wilberforce

Laws applied
- Overruled by
- Murphy v Brentwood DC [1991]

Anns v Merton London Borough Council [1977] UKHL 4, [1978] AC 728 was a decision of the House of Lords that established a broad test for determining the existence of a duty of care in the tort of negligence, called the Anns test or sometimes the two-stage test for true third-party negligence. The case was overruled by Murphy v Brentwood DC [1991].

== Facts and background ==
In 1962, the local authority of Merton approved building plans for the erection of a block of maisonettes. The approved plans showed the base wall and concrete foundations of the block to be 'three feet or deeper to the approval of local authority'. The notice of approval said that the bylaws of the council required that notice should be given to the council both at the commencement of the work and when the foundations were ready to be covered by the rest of the building work. The council had the powers to inspect the foundations and to require any corrections necessary to bring the work into conformity with the bylaws but was not under an obligation to do so.

The block of maisonettes was finished in 1962. The builder, which was also the owner, granted 999-year leases for the maisonettes, and the last conveyance took place in 1965. In 1970, structural movements occurred resulting in failure of the building comprising cracks in the wall, sloping of the floors and other defects. In 1972, the plaintiffs, who were lessees of the maisonettes, issued writs against the builder and the council.

The plaintiffs claimed that the damage was a consequence of the block having been built on inadequate foundations since there was a depth of only two feet and six inches, instead of the three feet or deeper shown on the plans and required under the bylaws. The plaintiffs claimed damages in negligence against the council for approving the foundations and/or failing to inspect the foundations.

At the hearing at first instance, the plaintiffs' case failed on the basis that it was statute barred as the cause of action arose on the first sale of a maisonette by the owner, more than six years before an action was commenced. The Court of Appeal allowed the appeals on the basis that the cause of action arose when the damage was discovered or ought to have been discovered.

The court found in favour of the tenants.

== Legal reasoning ==
The appeal was raised on two points:

- Whether the local council were under any duty of care toward owners or occupiers of houses as regards inspection during the building process
- What period of limitation applied to claims by such owners or occupiers against the local council

The House of Lords unanimously decided that a duty of care existed and that such a duty was not barred by a "limitation of actions" statute.

The leading judgment was delivered by Lord Wilberforce with whom all the fellow judges concurred. Lord Salmon delivered a speech within which he agreed in substance with Lord Wilberforce but contained a separate analysis of, in particular, the issue of duty of care.

Lord Wilberforce accepted what might be seen as the high point of the adoption of the statements of Lord Atkin in Donoghue v Stevenson, the "neighbour principle":

Through the trilogy of cases in this House, Donoghue v Stevenson, Hedley Byrne & Co Ltd v Heller & Partners Ltd and Home Office v Dorset Yacht Co Ltd, the position has now been reached that in order to establish that a duty of care arises in a particular situation, it is not necessary to bring the facts of that situation within those of previous situations in which a duty of care has been held to exist. Rather the question has to be approached in two stages. First one has to ask whether, as between the alleged wrongdoer and the person who has suffered damage there is a sufficient relationship of proximity or neighbourhood such that, in the reasonable contemplation of the former, carelessness on his part may be likely to cause damage to the latter, in which case a prima facie duty of care arises. Secondly, if the first question is answered affirmatively, it is necessary to consider whether there are any considerations which ought to negative, or to reduce or limit the scope of the duty or the class of person to whom it is owed or the damages to which a breach of it may give rise.

Hedley Byrne v Heller was held as an example of a case in which there was a reduction in the scope of the duty of care.

The Anns Test was established a by Lord Wilberforce as two-stage test. It required a sufficient relationship of proximity based upon foreseeability and then considerations of reasons that there should not be a duty of care.

Applying that general statement and approach, Lord Wilberforce considered the particular position of the council as the administrator of the Public Health Act 1936 and its bylaws as to building made by the council under that Act. Lord Wilberforce summarised the position as being one where the council was administering an act-enabling local council through building bylaws to supervise and control the operations of builders, particularly the supervision of the foundations of buildings because the foundation is covered up as the building proceeds. That is specifically recognised by a particular bylaw, which required the foundation of every building to be taken down to such a depth or to be so designed and constructed as to safeguard the building against damage by swelling or shrinkage of the subsoil. Lord Wilberforce noted that the builder was required to notify the local authority before it covered up the foundations so that the local authority had the right to inspect and to insist on correction.

As Lord Wilberforce noted, the issue with respect to the council was that it was discharging powers and duties as a matter of public, not private, law. However, he noted that there was no doubt that private law duties arise over and above or alongside the public law's functions.

Lord Wilberforce noted that almost every exercise of statutory power must inherently adversely affect the interests of private citizens, but in many cases, the powers can be carried out properly and without causing harm to the parties likely to be affected.

The court needs to give consideration to the balance between efficiency and thrift. The local council was under no duty to inspect but had a duty to give proper consideration whether it should inspect or not. Further that if the council inspected, it had to carry out that inspection exercising reasonable care. Lord Wilberforce had to consider a decision of the House of Lords in East Suffolk River Catchment Board v. Kent in which it was argued a Statutory Authority failed in reasonable time to repair the breach of a drainage bank and damage was sustained by the plaintiffs land as a result. Lord Wilberforce stated that case was decided on the basis of a different statute, subject to a different range of considerations, but that it might be said that there was no real consideration of a general duty of care and that the content of any duty of care against the background of considerable flooding and other activity being undertaken by the defendant argued for a lower standard of care, if not the absence of a duty of care.

Lord Wilberforce had no difficulty saying that on that basis the duty of care existed was affirmed and owed to the owners and occupiers of the houses. The owners or occupiers were not an endless indeterminate class of potential plaintiffs.

The nature of the duty of care had to be closely related to the consideration of the statutory powers granted to the council and the exercise of due care in those powers.

Lord Wilberforce dismissed the limitation of actions issues quite quickly and held that the claim was not statute-barred.

== Rejection of precedent ==
Over the following years, the courts backed away from the Anns approach and instead decided on a more category-based reasoning. The test was finally put to rest with the case of Murphy v Brentwood DC [1991] 1 AC 398, [1990] 2 All ER 908. It has been suggested by academics that the change was in reaction to the conservative political climate in the United Kingdom at the time.

Nevertheless, the Anns approach has inspired the development of tort law in many parts of the world. It has since been adopted by Canada in the case City of Kamloops v. Nielsen and later modified by Cooper v. Hobart. The modified Anns test is largely used for establishing new duties of care.

== Canada ==
The Anns test was adopted by the Supreme Court of Canada in 1984 to help it determine Kamloops (City of) v Nielsen. Despite being overruled in the United Kingdom, the Anns test remains current in Canadian law and has been used there in 31 Supreme Court rulings.
