= Various Claimants v Barclays Bank plc =

- Court: UK Supreme Court
- Citation: [2020] UKSC 13, [2020] AC 973, [2020] 2 WLR 960, [2020] 4 All ER 19, [2020] PNLR 22, (2020) 175 BMLR 1, [2020] PIQR P11, [2020] ICR 893, [2020] Med LR 155, [2020] IRLR 481, [2020] WLR(D) 205, 2020 Rep LR 74

Keywords
- Vicarious liability in English law

Various Claimants v Barclays Bank plc [2020] UKSC 13, [2020] AC 973 is an English tort law case, concerning vicarious liability in English law.

== Facts ==
Dr Bates, a doctor, did medical assessments of potential employees for Barclays from 1968 to 1984. Dr Bates was paid a fee for each report he did, and conducted the assessments in his own home. He was given no retainer fee that could have made him accept further jobs for the bank. Dr Bates sexually assaulted the claimants who argued Barclays was vicariously liable, but died in 2009 thus making recovery from him impossible. In 2012, the police concluded there would have not enough evidence for a criminal prosecution against Bates were he still alive.

At first instance, the High Court held Barclays was vicariously liable. The Court of Appeal dismissed the bank’s appeal.

== Judgment ==
The Supreme Court allowed the bank’s appeal and held a doctor was a contractor, not an employee. The bank was not vicariously liable.

== Significance ==
For a number of years before the decision in Barclays, the application of vicarious liability had been expanded both in terms of the type of tortious activity that could be considered within the scope of employment, and the type of relationships that could give rise to a relationship akin to employment (for instance, religious bodies in the context of sexual abuse as in Catholic Child Welfare Society v Institute of the Brothers of the Christian Schools). The decision by the Supreme Court rejected the extension of vicarious liability to genuine independent contractors. The decision was applied by the Court of Appeal in Hughes v Rattan.

== See also ==
- English tort law
