= Mohamud v Wm Morrison Supermarkets plc =

- Court: UK Supreme Court
- Citation: [2016] AC 677, [2016] UKSC 11

Mohamud v Wm Morrison Supermarkets plc [2016] UKSC 11 is an English tort law case, concerning vicarious liability in English law.

== Facts ==
Mohamud claimed that Morrisons was liable for a racial and physical assault by a petrol station employee, Mr Khan, in Small Heath, Birmingham. He asked to print off documents from a USB stick, was refused, racially abused, and told to leave. Khan then followed Mohamud to his car, told him never to come back, and physically assaulted him, ignoring a supervisor’s order to stop.

The Judge dismissed the claim for there being no close connection between what Khan was employed to do and the tortious conduct. The Court of Appeal upheld the judge.

== Judgment ==
The Supreme Court held that Morrisons was vicariously liable. Khan was an employee, so there was no difficulty on the first part of the test for vicarious liability. The issue was whether the connection is close, and it was.

Lord Toulson gave the leading judgment.

1. Vicarious liability in tort requires, first, a relationship between the defendant and the wrongdoer and, secondly, a connection between that relationship and the wrongdoer’s act or default, such as to make it just that the defendant should be held legally responsible to the claimant for the consequences of the wrongdoer’s conduct...

26. Salmond’s formula... was cited and applied in many cases, sometimes by stretching it artificially; but, even with stretching, it was not universally satisfactory. The difficulties in its application were particularly evidence in cases of injury to persons or property caused by an employee’s deliberate act of misconduct.

...

39. [In Lister v Hesley Hall Ltd...] The Salmond formula was stretched to breaking point’ because ‘even on its most elastic interpretation, the sexual abuse of the children could not be described as a mode, albeit an improper mode, of caring for them.

45. [A court must ask...] whether there was a sufficient connection between the position in which he was employed and his wrongful conduct to make it right for the employer to be held liable under the principle of social justice which goes back to Holt CJ... To try and measure the closeness of the connection, as it were, on a scale of 1 to 10, would be a forlorn exercise and, what is more, it would miss the point. The cases in which the necessary connection has been found for Holt CJ’s principle to be applied are cases in which the employee used or misused the position entrusted to him in a way which injured the third party...

46. I do not see that the law would now be improved by a change of vocabulary....

47. I do not consider that it is right to regard him as having metaphorically taken off his uniform the moment he stepped from behind the counter. He was following up on what he had said to the claimant. It was a seamless episode... This was not something personal between them; it was an order to keep away from his employer’s premises, which he reinforced by violence... It was a gross abuse of his position, but it was in connection with the business in which he was employed to serve customers.

Lord Dyson agreed and said "To search for certainty and precision in vicarious liability is to undertake a quest for a chimaera."

Lord Neuberger, Lord Reed and Baroness Hale agreed.

== See also ==
- English tort law
