= Mattis v Pollock =

English tort law case

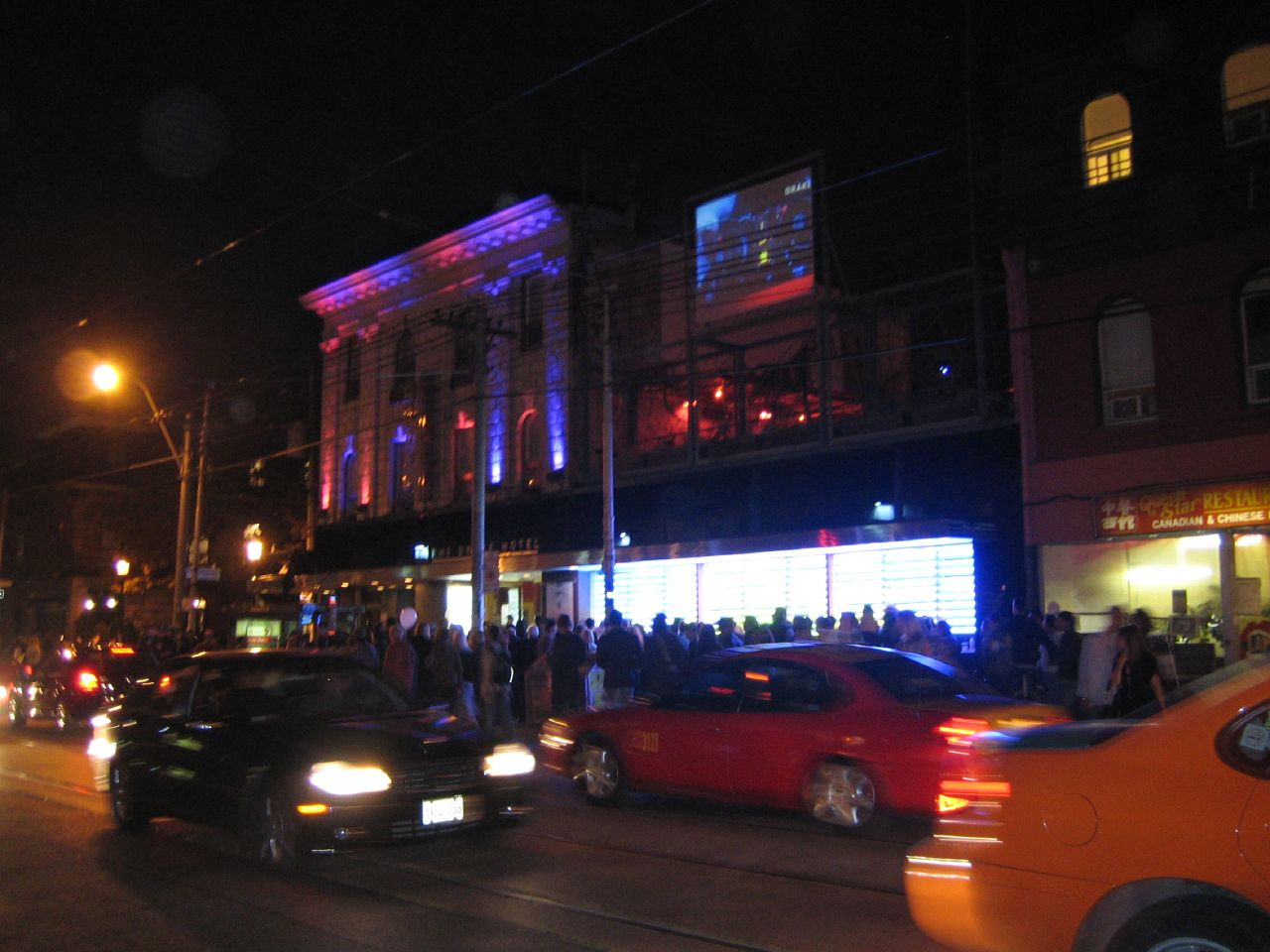
- Court: Court of Appeal
- Decided: 1 July 2003
- Citation: [2003] 1 WLR 2158

Keywords
- Vicarious liability, course of employment, close connection

Mattis v Pollock [2003] 1 WLR 2158 is an English tort law case, establishing an employer's vicarious liability for assault, even where it may be intentional or pre-meditated. Previously, judges had been unwilling to impose liability where assaults were motivated by revenge or vengeance; it was established, however, that following the decision in Lister v Hesley Hall Ltd, where an assault is closely linked to the duties of an employee, the employer should be held vicariously liable.

== Facts ==
Mr Cranston, an employee of Flamingos night club, in London, was employed as a bouncer to keep order at the club's doors, and to break up scuffles and fights. On 18 July 1998, an incident occurred involving a customer, Mr Fitzgerald, and Mr Cranston, who threw a friend of his across a room. It was submitted that Mr Pollock had given Mr Cranston instructions to "impress upon Mr Fitzgerald that Mr Cranston was prepared to use physical force to ensure compliance with any instructions that he might give to Mr Fitzgerald or any of his companions".

Subsequently, on 24 July, Mr Mattis was attending the club with a friend, Mr Cook. Mr Cranston was instructed that Cook should be barred from the club, and was ejected. A week later, Mr Mattis attended the club with other friends, at around 11:15pm. Mr Cook turned up with Mr Fitzgerald, at around 1am, and upon seeing them, Mr Cranston violently assaulted Mr Cook and one of his friends. Upon witnessing this, Mr Mattis attempted to pull Cranston from Cook, whereupon several other customers surrounded Cranston, who was forced to flee. Upon arriving back at the club, he grabbed Mr Mattis, and stabbed him in the back. As a result, Mr Mattis was rendered paraplegic.

== Judgment ==
The trial judge found the club's owner, Mr Pollock, was not liable for the stabbing of Mr Mattis. This event was not part of one continuous string of events; as Mr Cranston had fled home, leaving his duties, he was no longer within the course of his employment. He stated that:

"The lapse of time and intervening events were, in my judgment, of such a nature that it would not be right to treat the event culminating in the stabbing of Mr Mattis as one incident commencing in the club." Also according to the Times Law Reports

The doorman was employed by the defendant to keep order and discipline. However, he was encouraged and expected to perform his duties in an aggressive and intimidatory manner, which included manhandling customers. That aspect of the evidence was not sufficiently addressed by the judge.

The reality was the defendant should not have been employing the particular doorman at all, and certainly should not have been encouraging him to perform his duties as he did

The Court of Appeal rejected this, with Judge LJ stating:

The stabbing of Mr Mattis represented the unfortunate, and virtual culmination of the unpleasant incident which had started within the club, and could not fairly and justly be treated in isolation from earlier events, or as a separate and distinct incident. Even allowing that Cranston's behaviour included an important element of personal revenge, approaching the matter broadly, at the moment when Mr Mattis was stabbed, the responsibility of Mr Pollock for the actions of his aggressive doorman was not extinguished. Vicarious liability was therefore established. Accordingly the appeal on this ground must succeed.

Taking note of the recent decisions in Lister v Hesley Hall Ltd and Dubai Aluminium Co Ltd v Salaam, Judge LJ did not look to establish that the stabbing had occurred in the course of Cranston's employment, but whether the stabbing was closely connected to his work, and instruction It was of particular importance that Mr Cranston had been instructed by Mr Pollock, and was known to be, violent and intimidating toward customers:

Mr Pollock chose to employ Cranston, knowing and approving of his aggressive tendencies, which he encouraged rather than curbed, and the assault on Mr Mattis represented the culmination of an incident which began in Mr Pollock's premises and involved his customers, in which his employee behaved in the violent and aggressive manner which Mr Pollock expected of him.

== See also ==
- Lister v Hesley Hall Ltd
- Vicarious liability in English law
- English tort law
