= Peculiar risk doctrine =

The peculiar risk doctrine is a legal doctrine in the U.S. state of California by which an owner or employer can be held vicariously liable for damages caused by an independent contractor negligently performing their work.

The doctrine was created "to ensure that innocent third parties injured by the negligence of an independent contractor hired by a landowner to do inherently dangerous work on the land would not have to depend on the contractor's solvency in order to receive compensation for the injuries. Under the peculiar risk doctrine, a person who hires an independent contractor to perform work that is inherently dangerous can be held liable for tort damages when the contractor's negligent performance of the work causes injuries to others" (see Andreini case). There need not be any fault found on the part of the person who hires the independent contractor.

== Legal cases ==
- Privette v. Superior Court of Santa Clara County, 1993 5 Cal.4th 689
- Andreini v. Superior Court of San Mateo County, California Court of Appeal, 1998.
