= Century Insurance Ltd v Northern Ireland Road Transport Board =

Century Insurance Co Ltd v Northern Ireland Road Transport Board
- Court: House of Lords
- Citation: [1942] UKHL 2, [1942] AC 509

Century Insurance Co Ltd v Northern Ireland Road Transport Board [1942] AC 509 is an English tort law case, concerning vicarious liability in English law.

== Facts ==
An delivery company employee, Davison, threw a lit match on a floor after lighting a cigarette at a petrol station, causing fire.

== Judgment ==
The House of Lords held his conduct was in the course of employment.

Viscount Simon said it was negligence in the discharge of his duties.

Lord Wright held it was not prima facie negligent. Rather it was innocent. Only negligent through time and circumstance. You cannot treat the consequences as separate from the act. It did not matter that the acts were done for the driver’s own convenience rather than for the employer’s benefit.

== See also ==
- English tort law
