= Reverse doctrine of equivalents =

The reverse doctrine of equivalents is a legal doctrine of United States patent law, according to which a device that appears to literally infringe a patent claim, by including elements or limitations that correspond to each element or limitation of the patent claim, nonetheless does not infringe the patent, because the accused device operates on a different principle. That is, "it performs the same or a similar function in a substantially different way." It has been said that "the purpose of the 'reverse' doctrine is to prevent unwarranted extension of the claims beyond a fair scope of the patentee's invention."

== History ==
=== Supreme Court decisions ===
The two leading United States Supreme Court cases on the reverse doctrine of equivalents are Westinghouse v. Boyden Power Brake Co., and Graver Tank & Mfg. Co., Inc. v. Linde Air Prods. Co., Inc.,

In the Westinghouse case, Boyden's accused railroad train brake system satisfied the literal language of Westinghouse's patent claim, but the Court found no infringement. The Court said:

But even if it be conceded that the Boyden device corresponds with the letter of the Westinghouse claims, that does not settle conclusively the question of infringement. We have repeatedly held that a charge of infringement is sometimes made out, though the letter of the claims be avoided. [Citations omitted.] The converse is equally true. The patentee may bring the defendant within the letter of his claims, but if the latter has so far changed the principle of the device that the claims of the patent, literally construed, have ceased to represent his actual invention, he is as little subject to be adjudged an infringer as one who has violated the letter of a statute has to be convicted, when he has done nothing in conflict with its spirit and intent. "An infringement," says Mr. Justice Grier in Burr v. Duryee, 1 Wall. 531, 572, "involves substantial identity, whether that identity be described by the terms, 'same principle,' same 'modus operandi,' or any other. . . . The argument used to show infringement assumes that every combination of devices in a machine which is used to produce the same effect, is necessarily an equivalent for any other combination used for the same purpose. This is a flagrant abuse of the term 'equivalent.' "

More recently, in the Graver Tank case, the Court explained the doctrine in these terms:

[W]here a device is so far changed in principle from a patented article that it performs the same or a similar function in a substantially different way, but nevertheless falls within the literal words of the claim, the doctrine of equivalents may be used [in reverse] to restrict the claim and defeat the patentee's action for infringement.

=== Federal Circuit decisions ===
The Federal Circuit has imposed a number of limitations on the Supreme Court's seemingly broad statements in Westinghouse and GraverTank. In SRI Int'l v. Matsushita Elec. Corp., the district court had granted summary judgment of non-infringement against the patentee on the basis of the reverse doctrine of equivalents. The Federal Circuit en banc reversed, in a closely divided decision, stating that whether the reverse doctrine of equivalents applied "may depend on facts and circumstances unique to the case." It restated the doctrine in these terms: "The law also acknowledges that one may only appear to have appropriated the patented contribution, when a product precisely described in a patent claim is in fact 'so far changed in principle' that it performs in a 'substantially different way' and is not therefore an appropriation" of the patented invention.

To apply the reverse doctrine of equivalents, the Federal Circuit said, a factual investigation was needed to determine whether the Matsushita device's "structure is so far changed in principle that it performs the same or a similar function in a substantially different way," so that a trial of that issue was therefore required. This is not a legal question, the en banc SRI court insisted, and it disapproved the earlier statement of a Federal Circuit panel in Kalman v. Kimberly-Clark Corp., that non-infringement under the reverse doctrine of equivalents is a legal question.

The voting pattern of the en banc court in SRI was 5-1-5. The lead opinion insisted on a remand for trial on the reverse doctrine of equivalents issue, but found literal infringement. One judge found triable issues on reverse doctrine of equivalents, literal infringement, and prosecution history estoppel. The other five judges dissented, stating that (1) there was no literal infringement when the claims were properly construed in the light of the specification and the arguments made during the prosecution history, and (2) the undisputed fact record indicates that the accused device operates in a fundamentally different way from the patented device and therefore cannot infringe under the reverse doctrine of equivalents.

The lead opinion stated that the burden of proof was allocated in this "ping–pong" manner:

The patentee bears the burden of proving infringement by a preponderance of the evidence . . . . Initially that burden is carried when literal infringement has been proved . . . . When a patentee establishes literal infringement, the accused infringer may undertake the burden of going forward to establish the fact of noninfringement under the reverse doctrine of equivalents. If the accused infringer makes a prima facie case, the patentee, who retains the burden of persuasion on infringement, must rebut that prima facie case.

Several subsequent Federal Circuit decisions held that the reverse doctrine of equivalents did not apply in that case because the accused compound was not so dissimilar to those contemplated by the patentee that it would be inequitable to regard such a compound as being within the scope of the claim. Then, in Roche Palo Alto LLC v. Apotex, Inc., the Federal Circuit stated that the accused infringer must establish the principle of operation of the patent, in order to show a different principle, and held that supplying an expert to opine on the principle is insufficient to defeat a summary judgment motion.

== Continuing viability of doctrine ==
The Federal Circuit rarely approves of use of the reverse doctrine of equivalents to defeat a finding of infringement of a patent claim, and has frequently spoken of it in negative terms. For example, in Tate Access Floors v. Interface Architectural Research, the court remarked, "Even were this court likely ever to affirm a defense to literal infringement based on the reverse doctrine of equivalents, the presence of one anachronistic exception, long mentioned but rarely applied, is hardly reason to create another." In the same opinion, the court said, "Not once has this court affirmed a decision finding noninfringement based on the reverse doctrine of equivalents." Similarly, in Depuy Spine, Inc. v. Medtronic Sofamor Danek, Inc., the Federal Circuit said that 'the doctrine is rarely invoked and virtually never sustained."

Because of such statements, some district courts have questioned the continued viability of the reverse doctrine of equivalents. One district court stated that "the reverse doctrine of equivalents is . . . arguably moribund." On the other hand, another district court commented: "Until the Federal Circuit explicitly disregards the doctrine, the Court must presume its continued viability." Still another court commented:

Despite the paucity of cases relying on the reverse doctrine, the doctrine is not yet dead. Indeed, just last year, the Federal Circuit implied in two separate cases that the reverse doctrine of equivalents still had a heart beat, albeit a faint one.

== Commentary ==
● Samuel F. Ernst argues that many proposals are urged to combat the plague of "trolls" now troubling industry, but "the solution lies not in legislation, but in a common law doctrine lying right under our noses—the reverse doctrine of equivalents. Properly applied, the reverse doctrine of equivalents can serve to protect true innovation from patent thickets by excusing infringement when the defendant's product is substantially superior to the plaintiffs embodiment of the patented invention, both technologically and commercially." Ernst traces the historical development of the reverse doctrine of equivalents from the 1898 Boyden v. Westinghouse case to the "death," or perhaps "assassination," of the doctrine at the hands of the Federal Circuit. Ernst says, "The doctrine has been favored by scholars but frowned upon by the Court of Appeals for the Federal Circuit," citing for the first point Professors Mark Lemley and Robert Merges. Lemley is cited for "arguing that copyright law unfortunately lacks a doctrine akin to patent law's reverse doctrine of equivalents to protect radical improvers," while Merges is said to argue " that the reverse doctrine of equivalents is justified as a solution to situations where bargaining breakdown between patent holders and innovators of substantial improvements to patented inventions results in social welfare cost." He charges the Federal Circuit with, upon its inception in 1982, beginning "the practice of reversing or vacating district court decisions finding noninfringement under the reverse doctrine of equivalents."

Ernst says the Federal Circuit is wrong in calling the reverse doctrine of equivalents an "anachronistic exception, long mentioned but rarely applied." He points to a regular line of cases since Boyden leading all the way up to and past the 1982 founding of the Federal Circuit. "Further," he insists, "these cases do not suggest that the doctrine should be disfavored or rarely applied." These cases have gone unnoticed, Ernst says, because the name "reverse doctrine of equivalents" was not applied to this line of case law until the 1960s.

Ernst argues that "the reverse doctrine of equivalents should be invigorated to serve as a tool to protect the valuable unclaimed consideration society receives in exchange for the patent grant from the thicket of uncommercialized patented inventions."

● In an article in the AIPLA Quarterly Journal, Robert Unikel and Douglas Eveleigh urge reinvigoration of the reverse doctrine of equivalents in order to protect "alleged infringers who truly have transcended and/or transformed a patented invention using after-developed technologies." In such situations, they maintain, entrepreneurs accused of infringement resulting from use of after–developed technologies to perform functions described in earlier patents "will be able to argue that their products and/or methods, though technically a literal infringement of an earlier patent claim, are 'so far changed in principle from a patented article that [they] perform the same or similar function in a substantially different way.' " Such use of the reverse doctrine of equivalents would "act as a 'judicial safety valve' to preclude infringement based on what are essentially equitable factors."

They argue that the patent system's goal to promote innovation would be furthered by reinvigoration of the doctrine, because:

[M]eaningful application of the reverse doctrine of equivalents will assure that subsequent inventors/users who utilize after-developed technologies to create something entirely different and distinct from what is claimed in a patent—something 'so far changed [in] principle' that it does not truly reflect or embody a protected invention—will not be encumbered by unnecessary and/or inappropriate licensing obligations or damages awards."
