= José Antonio Ramírez López =

Spanish jurist, lawyer, and author

- Born: 1908
- Died: 1987 (aged 78–79)
- Occupation(s): jurist and lawyer

José Antonio Ramírez López (1908–1987) was a Spanish jurist and lawyer, author of a doctrinal study on the legal regime of bankruptcy.

== Works ==
- Los huéspedes de El Mundo (1936)
- Notas y adiciones de Derecho español al Tratado de Derecho de quiebras de Renzo Provinciali (1958)
- Derecho Concursal Español. La Quiebra (1959 1.ª ed.; 1998 2.ª ed.)
- Caín, ensayo (1967)
- La atalaya indiscreta (1968)
- El saco roto (1969)
- El Derecho llama a tu puerta (1970)
- Cartas de un abogado a las mujeres de España (1973)
- El laberinto de los afanes (1974)
- Las andanzas del Diablo. Confidencias de un abogado ingenuo (1975).
