= Morris v CW Martin & Sons Ltd =

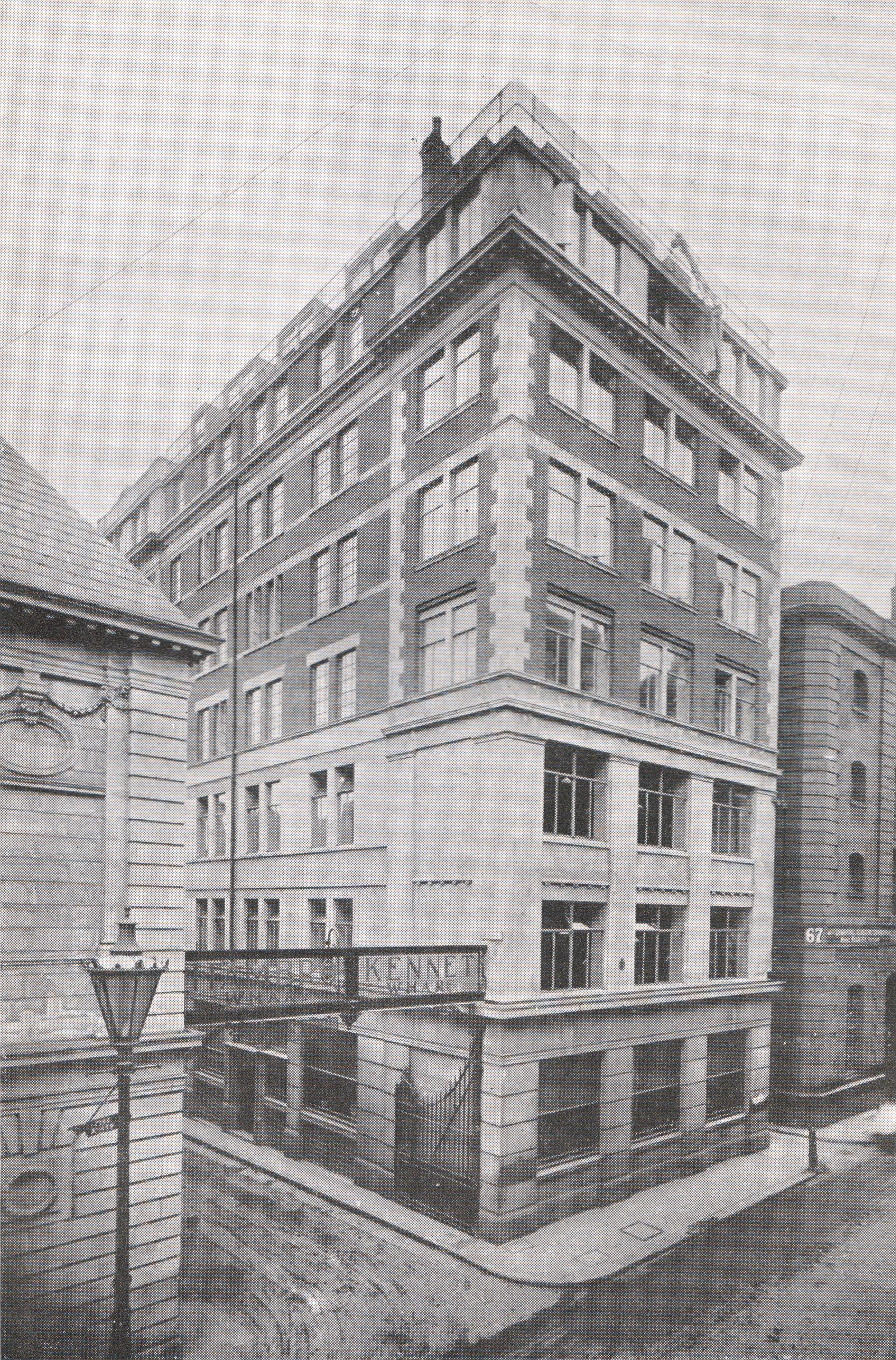
- Court: Court of Appeal of England and Wales
- Decided: 19 May 1965
- Citation: [1966] 1 QB 716

Keywords
- Sub-bailment, duty of care, theft

Morris v CW Martin & Sons Ltd [1966] 1 QB 716 is an English tort law case, establishing that sub-bailees are liable for the theft or negligence of their staff. Both Lord Denning and Diplock LJ rejected the idea that a contract need exist for a relationship of bailor and bailee to be found. Accordingly, it established an authority in vicarious liability, that employers are fully liable for the thefts - by employees - of goods that they have a duty to take care of.

== Facts ==
"(1) a wrongful act authorised by the master, or (2) a wrongful and unauthorised mode of doing some act authorised by the master."
John William Salmond's formulation of where an employer would be liable

Mrs Morris, the owner of a mink stole, sent her coat to a furrier in London, named Solomon Mark Beder. In a telephone exchange, Mr Beder stated that he did not do any cleaning himself, and that it was sub contracted to the defendant firm, CW Martins & Sons Ltd. They themselves were 'well-known', 'reputable' cleaners, and it was agreed that the fur coat would be sent to them. Upon collecting the fur coat, the defendant company did so under the terms of "The Fur Dressers and Dyers Conditions of Trading, 1955"; while it was in their possession, it was lost. Mrs Morris sued CW Martins & Sons Ltd, claiming that they had not exercised reasonable care in maintaining the coat; this argument was turned down by the first trial judge, who believed that the defendants took reasonable care to safeguard the coat. Additionally, he stated that the acts of the defendant's employee, in stealing the coat, were not committed in the course of his employment, and thus the employer could not be liable for them.

== Judgment ==
Lord Denning established that the key question to creating liability was whether Mrs Morris could sue the cleaning firm for the theft of their employee:

"Mr. Beder could clearly himself sue the cleaners. But can the plaintiff sue the cleaners direct for the misappropriation by their servant?"

Denning argued that she could, stating that a duty of care was owed by the sub-bailees to take reasonable care of the fur coat. This duty was non-delegable, in that they themselves were personally liable for the conversion of their employee, in stealing the coat:

From all these instances we may deduce the general proposition that when a principal has in his charge the goods or belongings of another in such circumstances that he is under a duty to take all reasonable precautions to protect them from theft or depredation, then if he entrusts that duty to a servant or agent, he is answerable for the manner in which that servant or agent carries out his duty. If the servant or agent is careless so that they are stolen by a stranger, the master is liable. So also if the servant or agent himself steals them or makes away with them.

This judgment had several effects. Denning was explicit in overruling the previous authority of Cheshire v Bailey, and creating a general duty of sub-bailees to take due care in the possession of goods. In doing so, both Denning and Diplock LJ rejected the trial judge's emphasis on contract theory; it is clear there was no contract between Mrs Morris and the eventual cleaners. However, the relationship of bailor and bailee of a chattel can exist outside of a contract, it was the existence of this relationship that gave rise to a duty in Diplock's view.

== See also ==
- Vicarious liability in English law
- English tort law

== Bibliography ==
- Devonshire, Peter (1996). "Sub-bailment on terms and the efficacy of contractual defences against a non-contractual bailor". Journal of Business Law (Jul). Sweet & Maxwell.
