= Williams v Natural Life Health Foods Ltd =

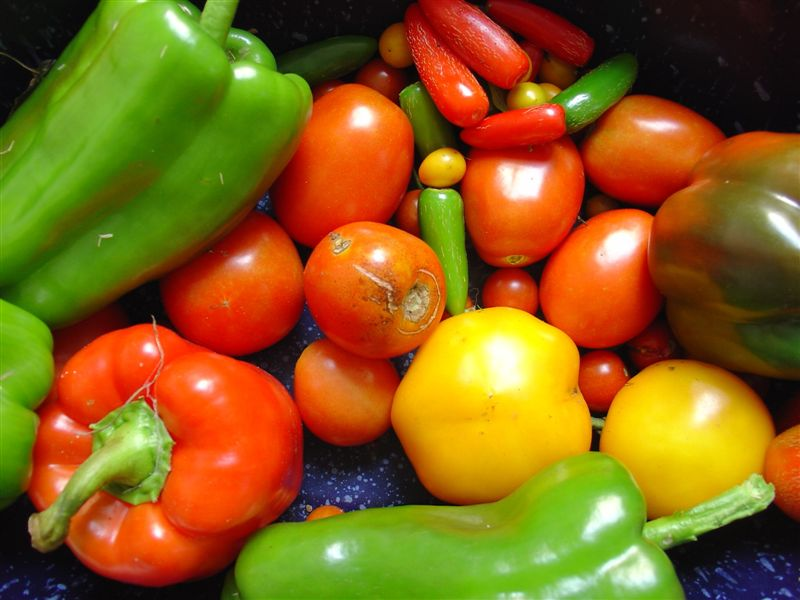
- Court: House of Lords
- Full case name: Williams and another v Natural Life Health Foods Ltd and Mistlin
- Citations: [1998] UKHL 17, [1998] 1 WLR 830, [1998] 2 All ER 577, [1998] 1 BCLC 689
- Transcript: Full judgment

Court membership
- Judges sitting: Lord Goff of Chieveley, Lord Steyn, Lord Hoffmann, Lord Clyde and Lord Hutton

Case opinions
- Lord Steyn

Keywords
- Assumption of responsibility, separate legal personality

Williams v Natural Life Health Foods Ltd [1998] UKHL 17 is an important English tort law, company law and contract law case. It held that for there to be an effective assumption of responsibility, there must be some direct or indirect conveyance that a director had done so, and that a claimant had relied on the information. Otherwise only a company itself, as a separate legal person, would be liable for negligent information.

== Facts ==
Mr Williams and his partner approached Natural Life Health Foods Ltd with a proposal. They wanted to get a franchise for a health food shop in Rugby (i.e. they wanted to use the Natural Life brand to run a new store and pay Natural Life Ltd a fixed fee). Mr Williams was given a brochure with financial projections. They entered the scheme. They failed, and lost money. So Mr Williams sued the company, alleging that the advice they got was negligent. However, before the suit could be completed, Natural Life Health Foods Ltd went into liquidation. So Mr Williams sought to hold the company's managing director and main shareholder personally liable. This was Mr Mistlin, who in the brochure had been held out as having a lot of expertise. Mr Mistlin had made the brochure projections, but had not been in any of the negotiations with Mr Williams.

The High Court allowed Mr Williams claim, and so did the Court of Appeal by a majority. The company and Mr Mistlin appealed to the House of Lords.

== Judgment ==
The House of Lords held unanimously that Mr Williams' claim would fail. They emphasised that there had been no separate assumption of responsibility directly to Mr Williams, and no requisite reliance. Lord Steyn's judgment was as follows.

What matters is not that the liability of the shareholders of a company is limited but that a company is a separate entity, distinct from its directors, servants or other agents. The trader who incorporates a company to which he transfers his business creates a legal person on whose behalf he may afterwards act as director. For present purposes, his position is the same as if he had sold his business to another individual and agreed to act on his behalf. Thus the issue in this case is not peculiar to companies. Whether the principal is a company or a natural person, someone acting on his behalf may incur personal liability in tort as well as imposing vicarious or attributed liability upon his principal. But in order to establish personal liability under the principal of Hedley Byrne, which requires the existence of a special relationship between plaintiff and tortfeaser, it is not sufficient that there should have been a special relationship with the principal. There must have been an assumption of responsibility such as to create a special relationship with the director or employee himself.

The practical application of the extended Hedley Byrne principle

Not surprisingly, opposing counsel approached the application of the principle of assumption of risk from different perspectives. Counsel for the respondents (the plaintiffs) concentrated in his argument on the pivotal role of Mr. Mistlin in the affairs of the company. Counsel for Mr. Mistlin (the defendant) concentrated on the absence of direct dealings between the respondents and Mr. Mistlin. The practical application of the extended Hedley Byrne principle was not agreed. Before I turn to the facts of the present case it is therefore necessary to explore this aspect. Two matters require consideration. First, there is the approach to be adopted as to what may in law amount to an assumption of risk. This point was elucidated in Henderson by Lord Goff of Chieveley. He observed, at [1994] 2 AC 145, 181B-C:

"... especially in a context concerned with a liability which may arise under a contract or in a situation 'equivalent to contract,' it must be expected that an objective test will be applied when asking the question whether, in a particular case, responsibility should be held to have been assumed by the defendant to the plaintiff"

The touchstone of liability is not the state of mind of the defendant. An objective test means that the primary focus must be on things said or done by the defendant or on his behalf in dealings with the plaintiff. Obviously, the impact of what a defendant says or does must be judged in the light of the relevant contextual scene. Subject to this qualification the primary focus must be on exchanges (in which term I include statements and conduct) which cross the line between the defendant and the plaintiff. Sometimes such an issue arises in a simple bilateral relationship. In the present case a triangular position is under consideration: the prospective franchisees, the franchisor company, and the director. In such a case where the personal liability of the director is in question the internal arrangements between a director and his company cannot be the foundation of a director's personal liability in tort. The enquiry must be whether the director, or anybody on his behalf, conveyed directly or indirectly to the prospective franchisees that the director assumed personal responsibility towards the prospective franchisees. An example of such a case being established is Fairline Shipping Corp v Adamson [1975] QB 180. The plaintiffs sued the defendant, a director of a warehousing company, for the negligent storage of perishable goods. The contract was between the plaintiff and the company. But Kerr J (later Kerr LJ) held that the director was personally liable. That conclusion was possible because the director wrote to the customer, and rendered an invoice, creating the clear impression that he was personally answerable for the services. If he had chosen to write on company notepaper, and rendered an invoice on behalf of the company, the necessary factual foundation for finding an assumption of risk would have been absent. A case on the other side of the line is Trevor Ivory Ltd v Anderson. This case concerned negligent advice given by a one-man company to a commercial fruit grower. Despite proper application of the spray it killed the grower's fruit crop. The company was found liable in contract and tort. The question was whether the beneficial owner and director of the company was personally liable. The plaintiff had undoubtedly relied on the expertise of the director in contracting with the company. The New Zealand Court of Appeal unanimously concluded that the defendant was not personally liable. McGechan J., who analysed the evidence in detail, said, at p. 532, that there was merely "routine involvement" by a director for and through his company. He said that there "was no singular feature which would justify belief that Mr. Ivory was accepting a personal commitment, as opposed to the known company obligation." That was the basis of the decision of the Court of Appeal. In his 1997 Hamlyn Lecture Lord Cooke of Thorndon commented that if the plaintiff in Trevor Ivory Ltd v Anderson "had reasonably thought that it was dealing with an individual, the result might have been different:" see Taking Salomon Further, Turning Points of the Common Law, p 18, note 50. Such a finding would have required evidence of statements or conduct crossing the line which conveyed to the plaintiff that the defendant was assuming personal liability.

That brings me to reliance by the plaintiff upon the assumption of personal responsibility. If reliance is not proved, it is not established that the assumption of personal responsibility had causative effect. In his Hamlyn Lecture Lord Cooke of Thorndon referred to two judgments of La Forest J in the Canadian Supreme Court on the element of reliance. In London Drugs Ltd v Kuehne & Nagel International Ltd 97 DLR (4th) 261, La Forest J emphasised in the context of an issue of personal liability of a company's employee the distinction between "mere reliance in fact and reasonable reliance on the employee's pocket-book." The second case is Edgeworth Construction Ltd v MD Lea & Associates Ltd [1993] 3 SCR 206. The plaintiff company had made a successful bid for a road building contract with a province. The plaintiffs allegedly lost money as a result of errors in the specifications and drawings prepared for the province by an engineering company. The Supreme Court held that the plaintiffs had a prima facie cause of action against the engineering company for negligent misrepresentation. I do not pause to consider that part of the decision. But the Supreme Court unanimously held that by affixing their seals to the drawing the individual engineers did not assume personal responsibility to the plaintiffs. La Forest J said, at p 212:

"The situation of the individual engineers is quite different. While they may, in one sense, have expected that persons in the position of the appellant would rely on their work, they would expect that the appellant would place reliance on their firm's pocketbook and not theirs for indemnification; see London Drugs, supra, at pp. 386-87. Looked at the other way, the appellant could not reasonably rely for indemnification on the individual engineers. It would have to show that it was relying on the particular expertise of an individual engineer without regard to the corporate character of the engineering firm. It would seem quite unrealistic, as my colleague observes, to hold that the mere presence of an individual engineer's seal was sufficient indication of personal reliance (or for that matter voluntary assumption of risk)."

This reasoning is instructive. The test is not simply reliance in fact. The test is whether the plaintiff could reasonably rely on an assumption of personal responsibility by the individual who performed the services on behalf of the company. To that extent I regard what La Forest J said in Edgeworth as consistent with English law.

Academic criticism of the principle of assumption of risk

Distinguished academic writers have criticised the principle of assumption of responsibility as often resting on a fiction used to justify a conclusion that a duty of care exists: see Barker, 'Unreliable Assumptions in the Modern Law of Negligence' [1993] 109 LQR 461; Hepple, 'The Search for Coherence' (1997) Current Legal Problems, Vol 50, 67, at 88; Cane, Tort Law and Economic Interests 2nd ed., 177 and 200. For this criticism two cases which were decided on special facts are cited: Smith v Eric S Bush [1990] 1 AC 831; White v Jones [1995] 2 AC 207. In my view the general criticism is overstated. Coherence must sometimes yield to practical justice. In any event, the restricted conception of contract in English law, resulting from the combined effect of the principles of consideration and privity of contract, was the backcloth against which Hedley Byrne was decided and the principle developed in Henderson. In The Pioneer Container [1994] 2 AC 324, 335, Lord Goff of Chieveley (giving the judgment of the Privy Council in a Hong Kong appeal) said that it was open to question how long the principles of consideration and privity of contract will continue to be maintained. It may become necessary for the House of Lords to re-examine the principles of consideration and privity of contract. But while the present structure of English contract law remains intact the law of tort, as the general law, has to fulfil an essential gap-filling role. In these circumstances there was, and is, no better rationalisation for the relevant head of tort liability than assumption of responsibility. Returning to the particular question before the House it is important to make clear that a director of a contracting company may only be held liable where it is established by evidence that he assumed personal liability and that there was the necessary reliance. There is nothing fictional about this species of liability in tort.

Applying the principle to the facts

Mr Mistlin owned and controlled the company. The company held itself out as having the expertise to provide reliable advice to franchisees. The brochure made clear that this expertise derived from Mr Mistlin's experience in the operation of the Salisbury shop. In my view these circumstances were insufficient to make Mr. Mistlin personally liable to the respondents. Stripped to essentials the reasons of Langley J, the reasons of the majority in the Court of Appeal and the arguments of counsel for the respondents can be considered under two headings. First, it is said that the terms of the brochure, and in particular its description of the role of Mr. Mistlin, are sufficient to amount to an assumption of responsibility by Mr Mistlin. In his dissenting judgment Sir Patrick Russell rightly pointed out that in a small one-man company "the managing director will almost inevitably be the one possessed of qualities essential to the functioning of the company": 156(a). By itself this factor does not convey that the managing director is willing to be personally answerable to the customers of the company. Secondly, great emphasis was placed on the fact that it was made clear to the franchisees that Mr Mislin's expertise derived from his experience in running the Salisbury shop for his own account. Hirst LJ summarised the point by saying that "the relevant knowledge and experience was entirely his qua Mr Mistlin, and not his qua director:" 153(h). The point will simply not bear the weight put on it. Postulate a food expert who over ten years gains experience in advising customers on his own account. Then he incorporates his business as a company and he so advises his customers. Surely, it cannot be right to say that in the new situation his earlier experience on his own account is indicative of an assumption of personal responsibility towards his customers. In the present case there were no personal dealings between Mr. Mistlin and the respondents. There were no exchanges or conduct crossing the line which could have conveyed to the respondents that Mr Mistlin was willing to assume personal responsibility to them. Contrary to the submissions of counsel for the respondents, I am also satisfied that there was not even evidence that the respondents believed that Mr Mistlin was undertaking personal responsibility to them. Certainly, there was nothing in the circumstances to show that the respondents could reasonably have looked to Mr Mistlin for indemnification of any loss. For these reasons I would reject the principal argument of counsel for the respondents.

The joint tortfeasor point

Counsel for the respondents tried to support the judgment of the Court of Appeal on the alternative ground that Mr. Mistlin had played a prominent part in the production of the negligent projections and had directed that the projections be supplied to the respondents. Accordingly, he submitted, Mr. Mistlin was a joint tortfeasor with the company, the latter being liable to the respondents on the extended Hedley Byrne principle.

I am satisfied that this case was never pleaded as an independent cause of action. Like Hirst LJ in the Court of Appeal (with whom Waite LJ agreed) I am satisfied reading Langley J's judgment as a whole (and see in particular at p. 303(c)) that he never intended to find that Mr. Mistlin was liable to the respondents as a joint tortfeasor. The possibility of such a cause of action was raised in the Court of Appeal but expressly abandoned. And it was not included in the Agreed Statement of Facts and Issues before the Appellate Committee. In these circumstances the point is not open to the respondents. In any event, the argument is unsustainable. A moment's reflection will show that, if the argument were to be accepted in the present case, it would expose directors, officers and employees of companies carrying on business as providers of services to a plethora of new tort claims. The fallacy in the argument is clear. In the present case liability of the company is dependent on a special relationship with the respondents giving raise to an assumption of responsibility. Mr. Mistlin was a stranger to that particular relationship. He cannot therefore be liable as a joint tortfeasor with the company. If he is to be held liable to the respondents, it could only be on the basis of a special relationship between himself and the respondents. There was none. I would therefore reject this alternative argument.

== See also ==
- Lister v Romford Ice & Cold Storage Co Ltd [1957] AC 555
- Professional negligence
