= Honeywill and Stein Ltd v Larkin Brothers Ltd =

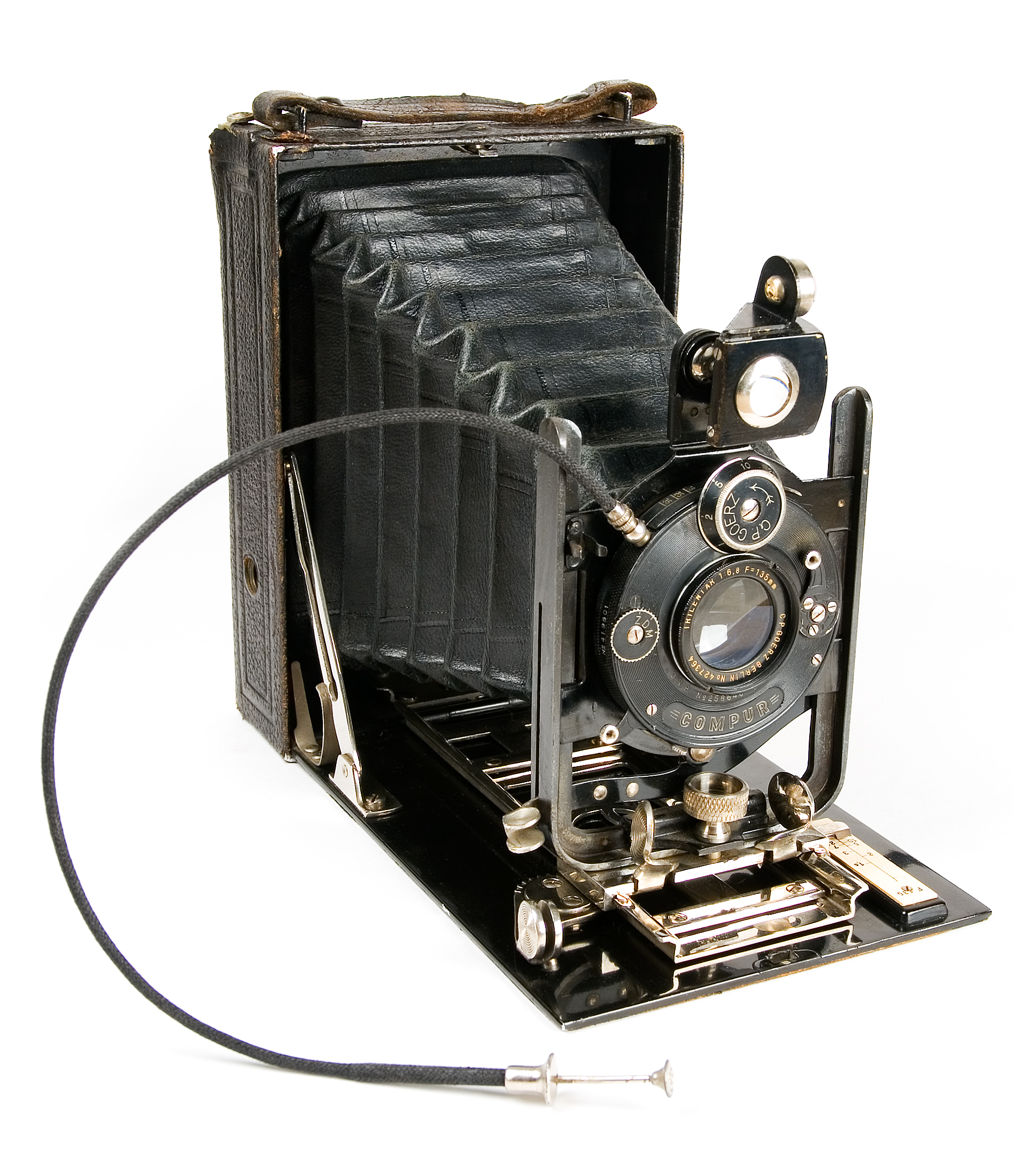
- Court: Court of Appeal of England and Wales
- Decided: 20 October 1933
- Citation: [1934] 1 KB 191

Keywords
- Vicarious liability, independent contractors, extra-hazardous activities

Honeywill and Stein Ltd v Larkin Brothers Ltd [1934] 1 KB 191 is an English tort law case, establishing that employers may be vicariously liable for damage done by their independent contractors, where they carry out 'extra-hazardous' activities. Generally, employers are only vicariously liable for the torts of their employees, and not for those of independent contractors. However, a non-delegable duty may be imposed on an employer where they contract for inherently dangerous activities to be undertaken.

== Facts ==
Honeywill and Stein Ltd, after conducting acoustic work in a cinema owned by Denman Picture Houses, requested permission to have photographs taken of the interior of the cinema. On the attendance of Larkin Brothers Ltd to take photographs, magnesium powder was ignited in order to create a flash light, to better illuminate the cinema interior. It was argued that such practice was common in photographing the insides of buildings, despite creating intense heat and being hazardous if ignited near fabrics. The photographers were found guilty of negligence in igniting the flash just four foot from a cinema curtain, setting fire to it and causing damage of £261.4s.3d. However, Honeywill and Stein Ltd, under threat of litigation from the cinema company chose to pay this balance in full. The action was therefore for the recovery of this sum, under the pretense that Honeywill and Stein Ltd could not be responsible for the tort of an independent contractor.

== Judgment ==
It had previously been held that employers were not liable for the torts of independent contractors, as they are for their employees. Slesser L.J. explained the finding of liability by stating that where an activity is contracted for, which brings with it an inherent danger, this is non-delegable:

In our opinion the principles enunciated by Talbot J are correct, and are applicable to the present case. To take the photograph in the cinema with a flashlight was, on the evidence stated above, a dangerous operation in its intrinsic nature, involving the creation of fire and explosion on another person's premises, that is in the cinema, the property of the cinema company. The appellants, in procuring this work to be performed by their contractors, the respondents, assumed an obligation to the cinema company which was, as we think, absolute, but which was at least an obligation to use reasonable precautions, to see that no damage resulted to the cinema company from these dangerous operations: that obligation they could not delegate by employing the respondents as independent contractors, but they were liable in this regard for the respondents' acts. For the damage actually caused the appellants were accordingly liable in law to the cinema company, and are entitled to claim and recover from the respondents damages for their breach of contract, or negligence in performing their contract to take the photographs.

Langton J followed a similar line of reasoning, stating that there should be two exceptions to employers not being liable for independent contractors; where a special duty is, by statute, imposed on an employer, and where chemicals or substances which are dangerous in themselves are to be used.

== See also ==
- Vicarious liability in English law
- English tort law

== Bibliography ==
- Friedmann, W (1942). "Liability for Independent Contractors". The Modern Law Review. 6 (1/2). Blackwell Publishing.
