= Rose v Plenty =

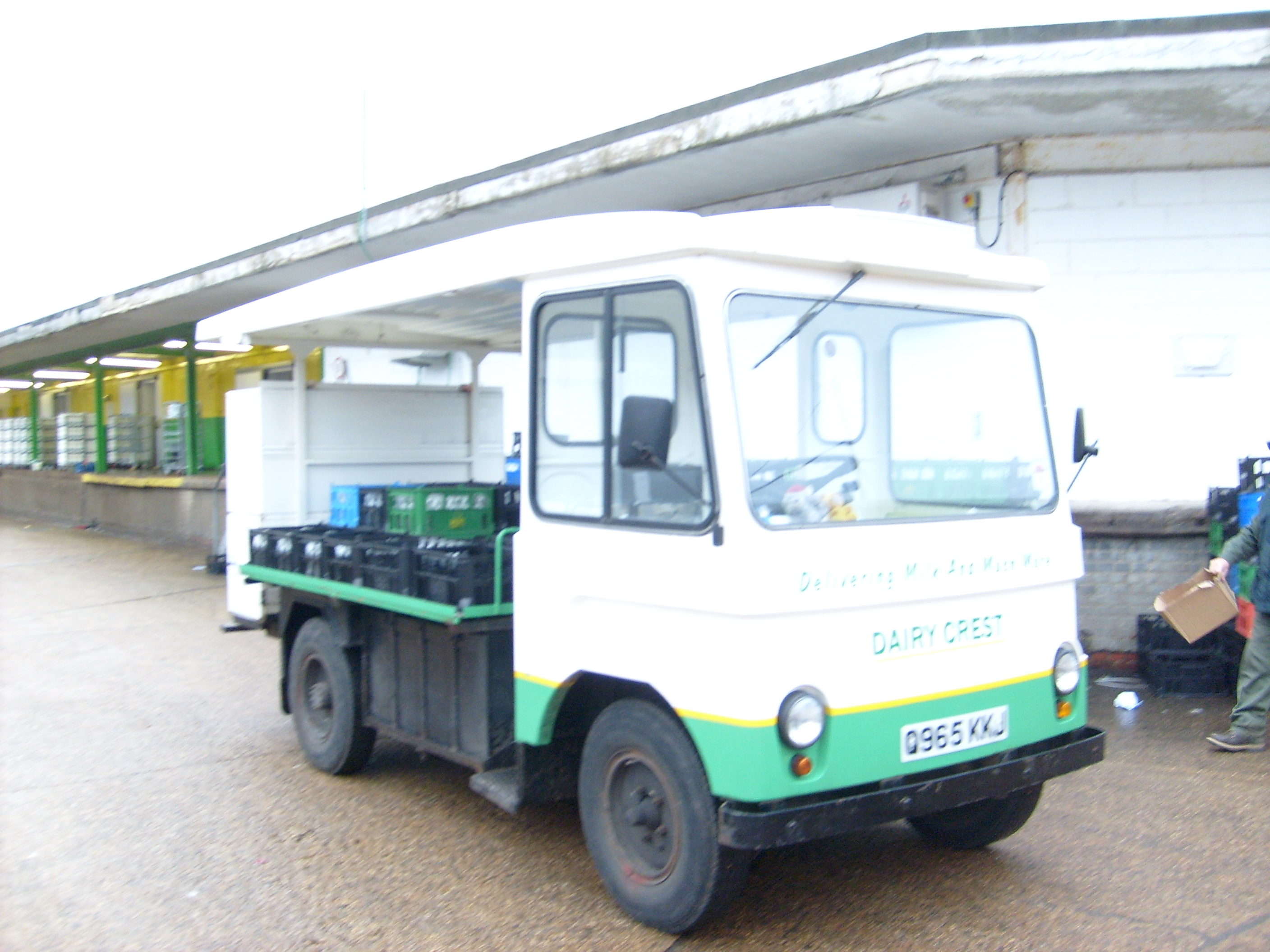
- Court: Court of Appeal
- Decided: 7 July 1975
- Citation: [1976] 1 WLR 141

Keywords
- Vicarious liability, course of employment

Rose v Plenty [1976] 1 WLR 141 is an English tort law case, on the issue of where an employee is acting within the course of their employment. Vicarious liability was tenuously found under John William Salmond's test for course of employment, which states that an employer will be held liable for either a wrongful act they have authorised, or a wrongful and unauthorised mode of an act that was authorised.

== Facts ==
Mr Plenty was a milkman under employment in Bristol by the Co-operative Retail Services Ltd, since Easter of 1970. At the depot where he worked, there was a prohibition on allowing children onto any vehicle, with evidence that the employers and trade unions had attempted to stop such behaviour. There were signs to this effect, which were large and visible to employees; one such stated:

"Children and young persons must not in any circumstances be employed by you in the performance of your duties.

However, children still persisted in going to the depot in the hopes of being allowed onto milk floats. Soon after he was employed, Mr Plenty was approached by Leslie Rose, at the time a 13-year-old boy, who asked if he could help the employee on his rounds. This was agreed upon, and Rose engaged in collecting money and delivering milk during Mr Plenty's rounds. He was paid a small wage for this help on several occasions, before he was injured due to the negligent driving of Mr Plenty, suffering a fractured leg. At first instance, Plenty was adjudged 75% contributorily negligent, and recovery from the employer was barred altogether, the judge stating that it was not in the scope of Mr Plenty's employment to take on a child as a subordinate.

== Judgment ==
On appeal to the Court of Appeal, this judgment was reversed, with Lord Denning making the leading speech. It was established that, as in the case of Limpus v London General Omnibus Company the employee was merely acting in an unauthorised way, whilst still going about his duties of delivering milk:

In the present case it seems to me that the course of the milk roundsman's employment was to distribute the milk, collect the money and to bring back the bottles to the van. He got or allowed this young boy to do part of that business which was the employers' business. It seems to me that although prohibited, it was conduct which was within the course of the employment; and on this ground I think the judge was in error. I agree it is a nice point in these cases on which side of the line the case falls; but, as I understand the authorities, this case falls within those in which the prohibition affects only the conduct within the sphere of the employment and did not take the conduct outside the sphere altogether. I would hold that the conduct of the roundsman was within the course of his employment and the masters are liable accordingly, and I would allow the appeal.

Whilst the majority of Lord Denning and Scarman LJ agreed upon this interpretation, Lawton LJ dissented, arguing that precedents set in two earlier cases, Twine v Bean's Express Ltd and Conway v George Wimpey & Co Ltd, could not be distinguished from the instant case. In these cases, no liability was found on the part of the employer where passengers taken by employees - against specific instructions - were injured. The leading judgment on appeal distinguished these on the grounds that the passenger (Leslie Rose) had been furthering (advancing) the employee's duties, this kept Mr Plenty within the course of his employment.

A consequence is the close or sporadic audit of all an employee's inherently risky activities becomes strongly advisable in the English employment system. The benefit is that third parties are less likely to suffer business-caused loss than before due to an employee's foolhardiness.

== See also ==
- Vicarious liability in English law
- English tort law
