= Catholic Child Welfare Society v Institute of the Brothers of the Christian Schools =

2012 English vicarious liability case

- Court: UK Supreme Court
- Citation: [2012] UKSC 56, [2013] 2 AC 1

Keywords
- Enterprise risk

Catholic Child Welfare Society v Institute of the Brothers of the Christian Schools [2012] UKSC 56 is an English tort law case, concerned with vicarious liability.

== Facts ==
A group action of 170 claimants had successfully claimed that between 1958 and 1992 they were sexually abused by Brother James Carragher, and various others, at St William's School in Market Weighton, in east Yorkshire. The Catholic Child Welfare Society (CCWS, a charitable company associated with the Diocese of Middlesbrough, referred to as the "Middlesbrough defendants") supplied the teachers and managed the school directly. The Institute of the Brothers of the Christian Schools (IBCS), an unincorporated association, also controlled where its "Brothers" taught.

The Court of Appeal found that the CCWS was liable, but the IBCS was not jointly liable. CCWS appealed to the UK Supreme Court, contending that IBCS should also be vicariously liable.

== Judgment ==
The Supreme Court found the IBCS was jointly liable because it formed part of the whole.

64. Bazley v Currie (1999) 174 DLR (4th) 45 was one of two decisions involving child abuse given by the Supreme Court of Canada on the same day. A not-for-profit organisation, D2, ran two residential care facilities for the treatment of emotionally troubled children. They unwittingly employed a paedophile, D1, who sexually abused one of the children in the home. The court, in a judgment delivered by McLachlin J, held D2 vicariously liable for the abuse. The issue related to stage 2. Could acts of sexual abuse properly be the subject of vicarious liability and, if so, on what basis? The court held that this question should be directly addressed in the light of considerations of policy. Two particular principles of policy were identified. The first was that where an employer puts into the community an enterprise carrying with it certain risks and those risks materialise and cause injury it is fair that, having created the enterprise and the risk, the employer should bear the loss. The second was that holding the employer vicariously liable might have a deterrent effect, causing employers to exercise a greater degree of care in relation to the appointment and supervision of employees. So far as the legal test of liability was concerned, para 42 of the judgment summarised the position as follows:

"…there must be a strong connection between what the employer was asking the employee to do (the risk created by the employer's enterprise) and the wrongful act. It must be possible to say that the employer significantly increased the risk of the harm by putting the employee in his or her position and requiring him to perform the assigned tasks."

65. Markesinis and Deakin's Tort Law, 6th ed (2007) describe this as the "enterprise risk" approach.

...

75. In Dubai Aluminium Co Ltd v Salaam [2002] UKHL 48; [2003] 2 AC 366 the relevant issue was whether dishonest conduct by a solicitor could involve the firm in liability under section 10 of the Partnership Act 1890 as having been carried on “ in the ordinary course of the business of the fi rm ” . Giving the leading speech Lord Nicholls held that it was necessary to apply the legal policy underlying vicarious liability, which he stated at para 21:

“is based on the recognition that carrying on a business enterprise necessarily involves risks to others. It involves the risk that others will be harmed by wrongful acts committed by the agents through whom the business is carried on. When those risks ripen into loss, it is just that the business should be responsible for compensating the person who has been wronged.”

76. This has strong echoes of the “ enterprise risk ” approach of the Canadian Supreme Court and, indeed, Lord Nicholls went on at para 23 to cite with approval from the judgment of McLachlin CJ in Bazley.

== See also ==
- English tort law
