= Vicarious liability in English law =

Vicarious liability in English law is a doctrine of English tort law that imposes strict liability on employers for the wrongdoings of their employees. Generally, an employer will be held liable for any tort committed while an employee is conducting their duties. This liability has expanded in recent years following the decision in Lister v Hesley Hall Ltd to better cover intentional torts, such as sexual assault and deceit. Historically, it was held that most intentional wrongdoings were not in the course of ordinary employment, but recent case law suggests that where an action is closely connected with an employee's duties, an employer can be found vicariously liable. A leading case is the Supreme Court decision in Catholic Child Welfare Society v Institute of the Brothers of the Christian Schools, which emphasised the concept of "enterprise risk".

Justification for such wide recovery has been made in several areas. The first is that, as is common in tort law, policy reasons should allow those injured to have means of compensation. Employers generally have larger assets, and greater means with which to offset any losses (deep pocket compensation) Secondly, it is under the instruction of an employer by which a tort is committed; the employer can be seen to gain from the duties of their employees, and thus must bear the consequences of any wrongdoings committed by them. Lastly, it has been justified as a way to reduce the taking of risks by employers, and to ensure adequate precautions are taken in conducting business.

== Developments in establishing liability ==
An employer is strictly liable for torts committed by those under his command, when they are found to be his employees. To this end, the courts must find a sufficient relationship to this effect, where issues of vicarious liability are raised. It has been stated judicially that no one test can adequately cover all types and instances of employment; thus, generally, the tests used and ultimate determination rest upon the individual aspects of each case, looking at all the factors as a whole. For example, it need not matter that an employer classifies a relationship as one of independent contractor, if all the other factors represent a relationship of employee.

Historical tests centered around finding control between a supposed employer and an employee, in a form of master and servant relationship. The roots for such a test can be found in Yewens v Noakes, where Bramwell LJ stated that:

"...a servant is a person who is subject to the command of his master as to the manner in which he shall do his work."

The control test effectively imposed liability where an employer dictated both what work was to be done, and how it was to be done. This is aptly suited for situations where precise instructions are given by an employer; it can clearly be seen that the employer is the causal link for any harm which follows. If on the other hand an employer does not determine how an act should be carried out, then the relationship would instead be one of employer and independent contractor. This distinction was explained by Slesser LJ:

It is well established as a general rule of English law that an employer is not liable for the acts of his independent contractor in the same way as he is for the acts of his servants or agents, even though these acts are done in carrying out the work for his benefit under the contract. The determination whether the actual wrongdoer is a servant or agent on the one hand or an independent contractor on the other depends on whether or not the employer not only determines what is to be done, but retains the control of the actual performance, in which case the doer is a servant or agent; but if the employer, while prescribing the work to be done, leaves the manner of doing it to the control of the doer, the latter is an independent contractor.

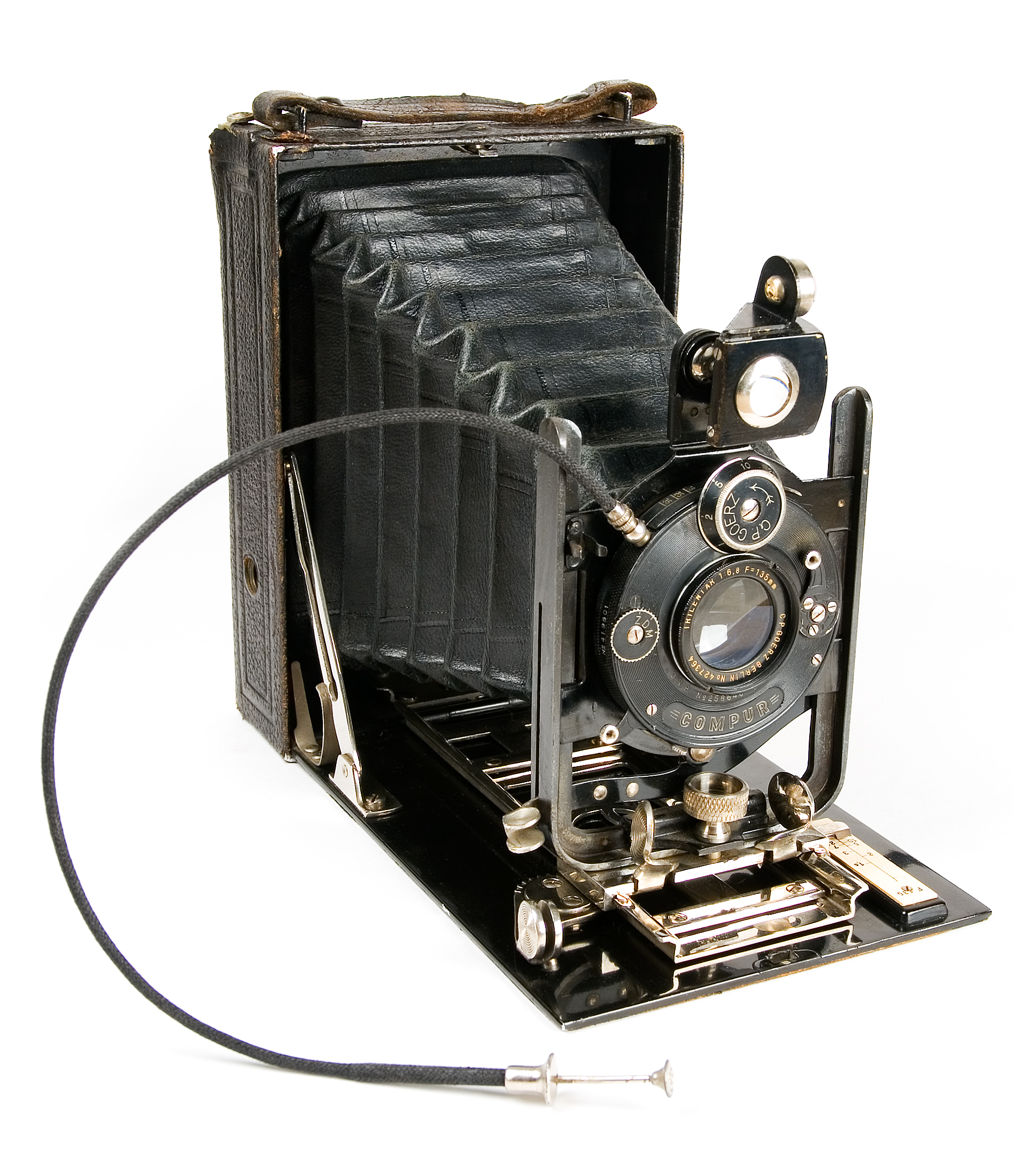
Liability for independent contractors was found in Honeywill and Stein Ltd v Larkin Brothers Ltd where photographers hazardously undertook to photograph a theatre interior, and set alight to it.

In recent years, as the duties of employees have grown ever more specialised and far reaching, the control test has seen less primary use in establishing liability. It is difficult to state for example that a hospital administrator controls the method and actions of a professional doctor, despite liability having been clearly established in such cases. Different formulations of the test have been proposed, in an attempt to rectify these problems. One such formulation focuses on the ability of an employer to specify where and when tasks be carried out, and with whose tools and materials.

Other tests of employment have focused on different contractual and external factors. Lord Denning proposed a test based on the integration of an individual to a business or organisation. Tests based on the economic relationship between an employer and employee have found favour in subsequent cases, notably Market Investigations Ltd v Minister of Social Security, in the decision of Lord Cooke. Here, it was argued that where a person was in business on their own account (and at their own risk), they would be under a contract for services, whilst otherwise they would be under a contract of service. This idea have been cited with approval by the Privy Council, with several relevant factors being considered, such as risk of loss, and chance of profit.

As can be noted, liability is generally not extended to the acts of independent contractors. Though such a distinction has been criticised, there are several circumstances in which an employer may be liable for the acts of contractors. If an employer commissions a tort, this will render the employer a joint tortfeasor. Additionally, where an employer is negligent in selecting a competent third party contractor, liability may be imposed. The broadest exception however is where a non-delegable duty is imposed upon an employer, either by statute or through common law, to prevent the harm of others. Where a duty is imposed by statute, either to carry out work in a certain way, or to take due care in carrying out work, then this is non-delegable. Common law duties may arise in several exceptional circumstances. One such is where an activity is being undertaken which is especially hazardous, and involves obvious risks of damage. This duty was recognised in Honeywill and Stein Ltd v Larkin Brothers Ltd, where photographers who negligently photographed the interior of a theatre set alight to the building. Their employers were found vicariously liable, as the dangerous methods of photography created a fire hazard. Additionally, where work is being undertaken on a highway, a non-delegable duty is created not to endanger any road users. Lastly, occupiers are liable in full where an independent contractor, through negligence, allows fire to spread to neighbouring land.

== The connection of torts to employment ==
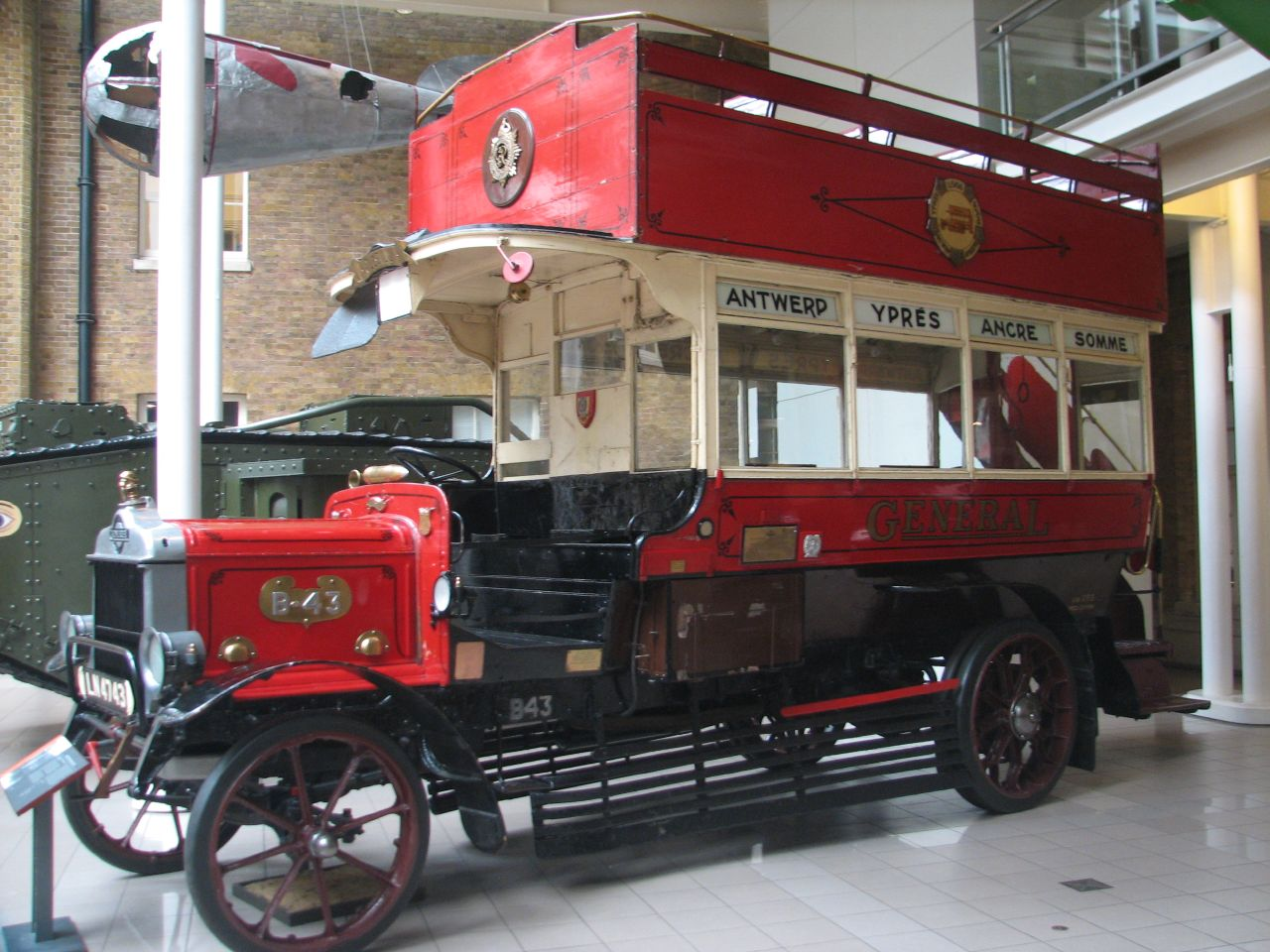
For an act to not hold an employer vicariously liable, it must be completely outside an employee's duties, as in Beard v London General Omnibus Company.

Once it is established that the sufficient relationship of employer and employee exists, it is necessary that any tort be committed in the course of employment. As with distinguishing an employer and employee relationship, there is no one test which adequately establishes which acts employers are vicariously liable for. Such determinations rest upon precedent, and the facts of each individual case. A preferred test of the courts was formulated by John William Salmond, some 100 years ago, which states that an employer will be held liable for either a wrongful act they have authorised, or a wrongful and unauthorised mode of an act that was authorised. The rationale for this is policy based; if an employer could simply issue detailed and long prohibitions on what an employee was not to do, they could never be found vicariously liable for the wrongdoings of their employees. However, a distinction can be drawn between acts which are prohibited, and acts which take employees out of the course of their employment. An illustration of the test is provided by two contrasting cases, Limpus v London General Omnibus Company and Beard v London General Omnibus Company, both involving road collisions. In the former, a driver pulled in front of another rival omnibus, in order to obstruct it. Despite express prohibitions from the employer, they were found liable; this was merely an unauthorised mode of the employee carrying out his duties (driving), not an entirely new activity. By contrast, in the latter case, the employer was not liable where a conductor (employed to collect fares on board the bus) negligently chose to drive the vehicle instead; this was completely outside of his duties.

The surrounding circumstances of wrongdoings are often important in deciding whether an act is in the course of employment or not. For example, where a professional rugby player was expressly prohibited in contract from assaulting another player, it was held that as it had been contemplated by the drafters, such an act was in the course of his employment. Where in Century Insurance Co v Northern Ireland Road Transport Board an employee set alight to a petrol station, by throwing a match carelessly away while refuelling a petrol tanker, this was adjudged to have been in the course of his employment.

There have been contrasting judgments where employees have given lifts in their vehicles, during hours of employment, as to whether their employers can be vicariously liable. Two similar cases demonstrate this problem. The first, Conway v George Wimpey & Co Ltd involved a driver, who, despite express prohibitions, gave a lift to an employee of another firm, and negligently injured him in an accident. No liability was imposed on the employer, as this was deemed to be an activity outside of the employee's duties. This can be compared to Rose v Plenty, where liability was imposed where a small boy was injured in a road accident, while helping a milkman on his rounds. It has been stated that these two decisions are not reconcilable. However, Lord Denning offered some justification in Rose v Plenty for the distinction, stating that the employee, in allowing the boy to assist him, was not acting outside of his employment, but acting in furtherance of it (through the boy assisting his duties).

"The master is only liable where the servant is acting in the course of his employment. If he was going out of his way, against his master's implied commands, when driving on his master's business, he will make his master liable; but if he was going on a frolic of his own, without being at all on his master's business, the master will not be liable."
Joel v Morison [1834] EWHC KB J39

Additional problems have arisen when attempting to establish where detours and leave from duty take an employee out of the course of his employment. One idea which is used in this area is that an employer will only be found liable where an employee is going about his business in a standard way. For example, a minor detour would not take an employee out of the course of his employment, but a 'frolic of his own', which did not at all involve his duties, would. Journeys to and from work, and whether these are regarded as in the course of employment, were considered in Smith v Stages, where Lord Lowry established several factors for determining liability. Ordinarily, employees will not be in the course of employment travelling to and from work, unless their transport is provided by their employer. However, travelling to an alternative place of work or to a workplace, during the employer's time, will be in the course of employment. Where course of employment generally begins with travelling to work has been established in the case of Compton v McClure. Here, an employer was found liable for the negligent driving of an employee, who, in an effort to clock in on time, injured another employee at the place of employment. It was stated that the 'least artificial place' to establish employment began was at the gates of the employer's factory, where they established speed limits, and supervised conduct.

In 2016, the Supreme Court judgment in Mohamud v WM Morrison Supermarkets plc [2016] UKSC 11 was handed down, with Lord Toulson giving the lead judgment. Lord Toulson held that the question of whether an employer was vicariously liable "in the simplest terms,” involved the consideration of two matters. The first question is what functions or “field of activities” had been entrusted by the employer to the employee. The second question is "whether there was sufficient connection between the position in which he was employed and his wrongful conduct to make it right for the employer to be held liable under the principle of social justice which goes back to Holt CJ”.

In 2020, the Supreme Court had a further opportunity to consider the principles underpinning vicarious liability in the case of WM Morrison Supermarkets plc v Various Claimants [2020] UKSC 12. In that case, a senior auditor employed by Morrisons had been asked to provide the supermarket's personnel records to their auditors KPMG. Whilst doing so, the employee surreptitiously downloaded the personnel files of 126,000 employees and uploaded it to an internet file sharing site. 9,263 employees and former employees of Morrisons then commenced proceedings against the company, alleging breach of statutory duty under s4(4) of the Data Protection Act 1988, misuse of private information, and breach of confidence, on the basis that Morrisons was vicariously liable for the employee's conduct. At first instance and in the Court of Appeal, it was held that Morrisons were vicariously liable, on the basis that

"the tortious acts in sending the claimants’ data to third parties were in our view within the field of activities assigned to him by Morrisons."

Lord Reed held that whilst the judge at first instance and Court of Appeal had “applied what they understood to be the reasoning of Lord Toulson in Mohamud [2016] AC 677” they had “misunderstood the principles governing vicarious liability in a number of relevant respects” which if correct would have constituted “a major change in the law.”

Lord Reed cited the judgment of Lord Nicholls of Birkenhead in Dubai Aluminium Co Ltd v Salaam [2002] UKHL 48 with approval, which he summarised as:

"the wrongful conduct must be so closely connected with acts the employee was authorised to do that, for the purposes of the liability of the employer to third parties, it may fairly and properly be regarded as done by the employee while acting in the ordinary course of his employment"

but he stressed:

"The words “fairly and properly” are not, therefore, intended as an invitation to judges to decide cases according to their personal sense of justice, but require them to consider how the guidance derived from decided cases furnishes a solution to the case before the court. Judges should therefore identify from the decided cases the factors or principles which point towards or away from vicarious liability in the case before the court, and which explain why it should or should not be imposed."

Consequently, as barrister Kevin Holder explained:

"the question was whether the employee's wrongful disclosure of data was so closely connected with the collation and transmission of the data to KPMG that, for the purposes of the liability of his employer to third parties, the disclosure may fairly and properly be regarded as made by him while acting in the ordinary course of his employment."

Lord Reed held:

"In the present case, it is abundantly clear that the employee was not engaged in furthering his employer's business when he committed the wrongdoing in question. On the contrary, he was pursuing a personal vendetta, seeking vengeance for the disciplinary proceedings some months earlier. In those circumstances, applying the test laid down by Lord Nicholls in Dubai Aluminium in the light of the circumstances of the case and the relevant precedents, his wrongful conduct was not so closely connected with acts which he was authorised to do that, for the purposes of Morrisons’ liability to third parties, it can fairly and properly be regarded as done by him while acting in the ordinary course of his employment."

== Intentional torts of employees ==
Historically, most actions alleging vicarious liability for intentional torts failed, primarily on the grounds that no employer employs an individual to be dishonest, or to commit crimes. This was the view taken with regard to most intentional torts, with several exceptions. Morris v CW Martin & Sons Ltd, for example establishes vicarious liability of thefts by an employee, where there is a non-delegable duty to keep the claimant's possessions safe. However, the scope of such liability was limited to torts committed in the course of employment, under the second limb of Salmond's course of employment test. This precluded recovery for torts committed while an employee was not involved in the furtherance of his employer's business. The importance vested in Salmond's test was not reconsidered until Lister v Hesley Hall Ltd, a case involving vicarious liability for sexual abuse. In following the ratio decidendi of the Supreme Court of Canada in the case of Bazley v Curry, the House of Lords established a newer test for finding liability in cases of intentional torts; where a tort committed by an employee is closely connected to their duties, their employer may be found liable. Although of undoubted greater use to claimants, the judicial latitude given to this test has been occasionally regarded as questionable. Lord Nicholls has stated that a "lack of precision is inevitable given the infinite range of circumstances where the issue arises."

=== Assault ===
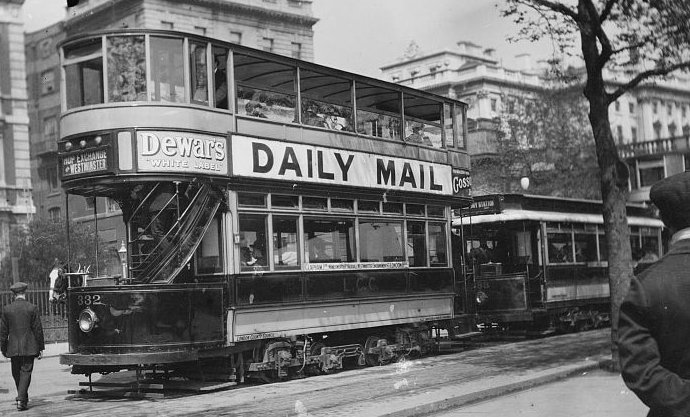
Liability for assault has been found much more readily than other intentional torts, as in Smith v North Metropolitan Tramways Co.

Unlike other intentional torts, which tend to be premeditated, liability for assault has been found in several cases prior to Lister v Hesley Hall Ltd. Poland v Parr & Sons involved an employee who assaulted a boy, believing him to be attempting to steal his employer's goods. Vicarious liability was imposed based on the employee's implied authority to protect his master's goods. Liability was also found where a tram conductor - in his duties - pushed a passenger out a tram, after he had not paid his fare. However, assault involving personal vengeance and spite was generally not found to result in liability, as in Warren v Henlys Ltd. This represents a principal limitation of the previous position of liability: only where an act was in the course of employment could an employer be liable. Premeditation and personal motive would take an employee out of their course of employment, breaking liability. The establishment of the close connection test has produced different results in cases of intentional assault, as demonstrated in Mattis v Pollock. Here, a bouncer for a nightclub was involved in a dispute with a customer. He subsequently went home and returned with a knife, stabbing the customer, resulting in serious injuries. The employer was held liable, despite the bouncer's intent on revenge, due to the close connection of the tort to the bouncer's employment and duties. It was of particular importance that the bouncer was employed to act in an aggressive and tough manner.

=== Theft ===
As noted, liability for theft has been found not primarily under the principles of course of employment, and vicarious liability, but via a non-delegable duty of employers to ensure that a third party's goods are kept safe. Morris v CW Martin & Sons Ltd, involving an employee who stole a fur coat from a dry cleaners, saw the establishment of this principle, with Lord Denning stating:

Once a man has taken charge of goods as a bailee for reward, it is his duty to take reasonable care to keep them safe: and he cannot escape that duty by delegating it to his servant. If the goods are lost or damaged, whilst they are in his possession, he is liable unless he can show - and the burden is on him to show - that the loss or damage occurred without any neglect or default or misconduct of himself or of any of the servants to whom he delegated his duty.

Vicarious liability for theft has also been found due to poor selections of employees by an employer, as in Nahhas v Pier House Management. Here, the management company of a luxury block of flats employed a porter, who was an 'ex-professional thief', to manage their building. A tenant of the building entrusted him with her keys, and was subsequently robbed of expensive jewellery. The management company were found to have been negligent in hiring the porter, having not carried out sufficient checks on his background, address, or obtaining a written reference. It has been stated it is unlikely that as a general rule, where there are proper checks and systems to prevent such incidents, liability would be found; it is in the interests of society to allow rehabilitation of offenders.

=== Sexual assault ===
Until recently, it was not considered that an employer could be vicariously liable for sexual assault, despite the particular vulnerability of children, and special care that must be taken in selecting employees. The Court of Appeal held in T v North Yorkshire CC that a headmaster's sexual abuse of children on a field trip was not within the scope of his employment, a previous criterion for an employer to be found vicariously liable. This rule was reversed in the shortly following case of Lister v Hesley Hall Ltd, effectively establishing liability for sexual assault, where it is closely connected with an employee's duties. Here, a warden of a boarding house sexually abused several children over the course of three years. Initially it was held (under the precedent of T v North Yorkshire CC) that such acts could not have been in the course of his employment. However, the House of Lords overruled the earlier case, with Lord Steyn stating:

The reality was that the county council were responsible for the care of the vulnerable children and employed the deputy headmaster to carry out that duty on its behalf. And the sexual abuse took place while the employee was engaged in duties at the very time and place demanded by his employment. The connection between the employment and the torts was very close.

In overruling T v North Yorkshire CC, the Lords established that the relative closeness connecting the sexual abuse and the warden's duties established liability. It was of importance however that the warden's duties were closely linked to the abuse. The mere opportunity to abuse children was not the reason for liability; it has been suggested that if it were a groundsman who had carried out the abuse, it would not have resulted in liability.

=== Fraud ===
Employers have been responsible for the fraudulent misrepresentations of their employees since the mid-nineteenth century, under the decision of Barwick v English Joint Stock Bank. This liability was extended in the early 20th century, to cover fraudulent actions which were not of benefit to the employer, a previous requirement. Thereupon, the test for vicarious liability of fraud was whether it was within an employee's authority – either actual, or outwardly appearing – to carry out the fraudulent actions that he did. It was not enough that an employee merely asserted that he had supposed authority, however; the defrauded individual or company must have been assured or led to believe by the employer – or have inferred through standard dealings – that the employee in question had it.

As with other intentional torts, such liability was extended following Lister v Hesley Hall Ltd, to cover any fraud which is closely related to an employee's employment. The first case of fraud to be decided under this authority was Dubai Aluminium Co Ltd v Salaam, involving the fraud of a senior partner in a firm of solicitors. The House of Lords chose to extend the principal liability of employers, to cover fraudulent representations made by employees with no actual or ostensible authority to make them. Here, despite the employer having made no representations to the claimants, it was found that the close connection between the partner's fraud and his duties established liability.

=== Employers and insurers ===
Lister v Romford Ice and Cold Storage Co created a controversial principle at common law, that where an employer is found vicariously liable for an employee's actions, they are entitled to recover an indemnity from them, to cover such losses. The House of Lords accepted by a narrow margin that there may be an implied term in the contracts of employees, by which they must exercise reasonable care and skill in their work. Such principles has received both criticism and support, for various reasons. Advocacy of the indemnity features on rules of principal liability; the person to commit a tort and to cause damage should pay damages arising from it. Critics state that the recovery of an indemnity is contrary to equity, due to the general lack of wealth of employees and servants. The advent of widespread insurance of employers has led to the recovery of indemnities being widely abandoned. This is illustrated by the British Insurance Association entering into a gentlemen's agreement not to utilise the rule:

"Employers' Liability Insurers agree that they will not institute a claim against the employee of an insured employer in respect of the death of or injury to a fellow-employee unless the weight of evidence clearly indicates (i) collusion or (ii) wilful misconduct on the part of the employee against whom a claim is made."

As such, indemnities are not pursued from employees. The decision in Lister was reaffirmed, without qualification, by the Supreme Court in Lifestyle Equities CV v Ahmed [2025] AC 1.

== See also ==
- English tort law
- Vicarious liability
