= Attribution (law) =

Legal doctrines extending liability to defendants that did not commit criminal acts

The doctrine of attribution is a legal doctrine by which liability is extended to a defendant who did not actually commit the criminal act. Examples include vicarious liability (when acts of another are imputed or "attributed" to a defendant), attempt to commit a crime (even though it was never completed), and conspiracy to commit a crime (when it is not completed or which is committed by another in the conspiracy).
