= Tipsy Coachman =

The Tipsy Coachman doctrine is a rule of law that upholds in a higher court a correct conclusion, despite flawed reasoning by the judge in a lower court. In other words, the lower judgment was right but for the wrong reason.

The colorful "tipsy coachman" label comes from a 19th-century Georgia case, Lee v. Porter, 63 Ga 345, 346 (1879), in which the Georgia Supreme Court, noting that the "human mind is so constituted that in many instances it finds the truth when wholly unable to find the way that leads to it", quoted from Oliver Goldsmith's Retaliation: A Poem written in 1774:

Here, waiter, more wine, let me sit while I'm able,
'Till all my companions sink under the table;
Then, with chaos and blunders encircling my head,
Let me ponder, and tell what I think of the dead.
...

Here lies honest William, whose heart was a mint,
While the owner ne'er knew half the good that was in't;
The pupil of impulse, it forced him along,
His conduct still right, with his argument wrong;
Still aiming at honour, yet fearing to roam,
The coachman was tipsy, the chariot drove home;
Would you ask for his merits, alas! he had none,
What was good was spontaneous, his faults were his own.

The Florida Supreme Court explained the doctrine in a 2002 appeal from a second-degree murder conviction:

We start with the proposition that generally, if a claim is not raised in the [trial] court, it will not be considered on appeal. However, notwithstanding this principle, in some circumstances, even though a trial court's ruling is based on improper reasoning, the ruling will be upheld if there is any theory or principle of law in the record which would support the ruling.

This longstanding principle of appellate law, sometimes referred to as the 'tipsy coachman' doctrine, allows an appellate court to affirm a trial court that reaches the right result but for the wrong reasons so long as there is any basis which would support the judgment in the record.

— Robertson v. State, 829 So. 2d 901, 906 (Fla. 2002) (internal citations and punctuation omitted)
