= Lister v Hesley Hall Ltd =

- Court: House of Lords
- Decided: 3 May 2001
- Citation: [2001] UKHL 22

Keywords
- Vicarious liability, course of employment, close connection

Lister v Hesley Hall Ltd [2001] UKHL 22 is an English tort law case which created a new precedent for finding where an employer is vicariously liable for the torts of their employees. Prior to this decision, it had been found that sexual abuse by employees of others could not be seen as taking place in the course of their employment, precluding recovery from the employer. The majority in the House of Lords, however, overruled the Court of Appeal and these earlier decisions, establishing that the "relative closeness" connecting the tort and the nature of an individual's employment established liability.

== Facts ==
A boarding annex (Axeholme House) serving Wilsic Hall School in Doncaster was opened in 1979; the principal students to live there having behavioural and emotional difficulties. The claimants in the instant case had resided there between the years 1979 to 1982, being aged 12 to 15 during this time, under the care of a warden, who was in charge of maintaining discipline and the running of the house. The warden lived at the house also, with his disabled wife, and together they were generally the only two members of staff in the house. His duties were to ensure order, in making sure the children went to bed, went to school, and engaged in evening activities, and at times also supervising other staff. It had been alleged by some of the boys that the warden had sexually abused them, including inappropriate advances and taking trips alone with them. A criminal investigation took place some ten years later, resulting in the warden being sentenced to seven years imprisonment; following this, the victims brought an action for personal injury against the employers, alleging they were vicariously liable.

== Judgment ==
T v North Yorkshire CC, decided just two years earlier by the Court of Appeal, had found that a headmaster's sexual abuse of a child on a field trip was not within the scope of his employment, a previous criterion by which an employer could be found vicariously liable. This was the view taken prior to the House of Lords appeal, but was reversed, with Lord Steyn making the leading judgment. Here, he cited a recent Canadian case, which had imposed liability for intentional torts, creating a new test of 'close connection', rather than using previous formulations:

My Lords, I have been greatly assisted by the luminous and illuminating judgments of the Canadian Supreme Court in Bazley v Curry, and Jacobi v Griffiths. Wherever such problems are considered in future in the common law world these judgments will be the starting point. On the other hand, it is unnecessary to express views on the full range of policy considerations examined in those decisions Employing the traditional methodology of English law, I am satisfied that in the case of the appeals under consideration the evidence showed that the employers entrusted the care of the children in Axeholme House to the warden. The question is whether the warden's torts were so closely connected with his employment that it would be fair and just to hold the employers vicariously liable. On the facts of the case the answer is yes. After all, the sexual abuse was inextricably interwoven with the carrying out by the warden of his duties in Axeholme House. Matters of degree arise. But the present cases clearly fall on the side of vicarious liability.

This decision is significant in the Lords' assessment of the Salmond test for vicarious liability as inadequate. The previous test had been framed as follows:

(1) a wrongful act authorised by the master, or
(2) a wrongful and unauthorised mode of doing some act authorised by the master.
It is clear that the master is responsible for acts actually authorised by him: for liability would exist in this case, even if the relation between the parties was merely one of agency, and not one of service at all. But a master, as opposed to the employer of an independent contractor, is liable even for acts which he has not authorised, provided they are so connected with acts which he has authorised that they may rightly be regarded as modes-although improper modes-of doing them.

— John William Salmond's formulation of where an employer would be liable

The Lords' new assessment was summarised as such:

For nearly a century English judges have adopted Salmond's statement of the applicable test as correct. .. It is not necessary to embark on a detailed examination of the development of the modern principle of vicarious liability. But it is necessary to face up to the way in which the law of vicarious liability sometimes may embrace intentional wrongdoing by an employee. If one mechanically applies Salmond's test, the result might at first glance be thought to be that a bank is not liable to a customer where a bank employee defrauds a customer by giving him only half the foreign exchange which he paid for, the employee pocketing the difference. A preoccupation with conceptualistic reasoning may lead to the absurd conclusion that there can only be vicarious liability if the bank carries on business in defrauding its customers. Ideas divorced from reality have never held much attraction for judges steeped in the tradition that their task is to deliver principled but practical justice.

This new test of close connection has been described as 'fairer', and of greater use to claimants. Lord Clyde stated three principles in his judgment which he felt should be considered:

- in considering the scope of the employment, a broad approach should be adopted;
- while consideration of the time and place at which the acts occurred will always be relevant, they may not be conclusive; and
- while the employment enables the employee to be present at a particular time and place, the opportunity of being present at particular premises whereby the employee has been able to perform the act in question does not mean that the act is necessarily within the scope of the employment.

Of importance is that the employment status of an individual cannot merely have provided the employee with an opportunity to commit a tort. There must be a connection between the duties of an employee and the tort committed, as restated in the subsequent case of Dubai Aluminium Co Ltd v Salaam, involving deceit and theft.

== Developments ==
Following this expansion of liability, employers have been found liable in subsequent cases for intentional torts of their employees. In Mattis v Pollock vicarious liability was found where a bouncer, intent on revenge, stabbed a patron of the night club at which he worked. Dubai Aluminium Co Ltd v Salaam established liability for fraud of employees, where it is outside their duties or authority to make certain representations.

== See also ==
- T v North Yorkshire CC
- Vicarious liability in English law
- English tort law
- Bazley v Curry [1999] 2 SCR 534

== Bibliography ==
- Deakin, Simon; Johnston, Angus; Markesinis, Basil (2007). Markesinis and Deakin's Tort Law. Oxford University Press. ISBN 978-0-19-928246-3.
- Levinson, Justin (2005). "Vicarious liability for intentional torts". Journal of Personal Injury Law (4). Sweet & Maxwell.
