= Bazley v Curry =

- Supreme Court of Canada

Hearing: October 6, 1998 Judgment: June 17, 1999
- Full case name: The Children's Foundation, the Superintendent of Family and Child Services in the Province of British Columbia and Her Majesty The Queen in Right of the Province of British Columbia as represented by the Ministry of Social Services and Housing v. Patrick Allan Bazley
- Citations: [1999] 2 SCR 534
- Docket No.: 26013
- Prior history: Judgment for Bazley in the British Columbia Court of Appeal
- Ruling: Appeal dismissed

Holding
- Vicarious liability may be attached to non-profit organizations

Court membership
- Chief Justice: Antonio Lamer; Puisne Justices: Claire L'Heureux-Dubé, Charles Gonthier, Peter Cory, Beverley McLachlin, Frank Iacobucci, John C. Major, Michel Bastarache, Ian Binnie

Reasons given
- Unanimous reasons by: McLachlin J
- Lamer CJ and Gonthier J took no part in the consideration or decision of the case.

Bazley v Curry, [1999] 2 SCR 534 is a Supreme Court of Canada decision on the topic of vicarious liability where the Court held that a non-profit organization may be held vicariously liable in tort law for sexual misconduct by one of its employees. The decision has widely influenced jurisprudence on vicarious liability outside of Canada.

== Facts ==
The Children's Foundation is a provincially funded, non-profit organization which operated two residential care facilities for children aged six to twelve. In April 1966, the foundation employed Leslie Charles Curry to work in its Vancouver home, where he was hired as a childcare counsellor practising "total intervention" in the lives of the children he was caring for. He worked there until March 1980, when the Foundation received a complaint. They investigated and discovered that Curry was in fact a paedophile and had been abusing the children under his care. In 1990 he was charged with 18 counts of gross indecency and two counts of buggery, and was convicted on all but one count, two of those convictions were in relation to the respondent in this case, Patrick Allen Bazley. Curry died not long thereafter. In this case, Bazley sought damages from The Children's Foundation, alleging that they are vicariously liable for the misconduct of its employee.

The main issue in this appeal was whether or not the Children's Foundation should be held vicariously liable for the actions of its employee. There were two questions before the court: May employers be held vicariously liable for sexual assaults on clients or persons within their care?; If so, should non-profit organizations be exempted from liability as a matter of policy?

== Judgment ==
The Supreme Court was cautious to allow vicarious liability to be attached to a non-profit organization. McLachlin J (as she then was) points out that vicarious liability is a form of strict liability, or no-fault liability. The Court was very openly concerned with policy in this decision as vicarious liability can be used by litigants to "sue into deeper pockets" even though the litigant may be suing an employer that is not at fault. McLachlin J surveyed a number of possible policy reasons for the imposition of vicarious liability and adopted two of J. G. Fleming's policy rationales:

(1) providing a just and practical remedy, and
(2) deterring future harm.

=== Test for vicarious liability ===
In determining if an employer can be found vicariously liable, courts will often use the Salmond test, which will find an employer liable for the actions of an employee which are:

(1) acts authorized by the employer or
(2) acts which are not authorized by the employer, but are so connected to authorized acts that they may be considered "modes" of acts authorized by the employer.

The Supreme Court here seems to express frustration at this test. It is possible to view Curry's actions either completely independently, or as a mode of performing an authorized act. The Salmond test does not give clear criterion for how differentiate these two. As such, the court clarified the test, saying that the court should consider:

(1) policy reasons in determining that vicarious liability should or should not apply
(2) whether the wrongful act is sufficiently related to the employment to justify imposing vicarious liability.

The court went on to explain that vicarious liability is generally appropriate where there is a significant connection between the creation or enhancement of risk and the wrong that flows from the risk. It will not be enough that the wrong took place on company property or through incidental connections.

In this case, because Curry was left alone for long periods of time unsupervised with his victims, was expected to bathe them and was placed by the foundation in a position of power over them, it can be said that there was a strong connection between what the employer was asking the employee to do and the wrongful act committed. The foundation significantly increased the risk of harm, and as such, should be found vicariously liable for Mr. Curry's actions.

=== Exception for non-profits? ===
The Foundation made three arguments that as a non-profit it should not be found vicariously liable

- it is unfair to fix liability without fault on non-profit organizations performing needed services on behalf of the community as a whole
- non-profit charitable organizations often work with volunteers and are thus less able than commercial enterprises to supervise what their agents do
- vicarious liability will put many non-profit organizations out of business or make it difficult for them to carry on their good work

McLachlin dismissed these arguments as "crass and unsubstantiated utilitarianism" and pointed out:

54 ... If, in the final analysis, the choice is between which of two faultless parties should bear the loss — the party that created the risk that materialized in the wrongdoing or the victim of the wrongdoing — I do not hesitate in my answer. Neither alternative is attractive. But given that a choice must be made, it is fairer to place the loss on the party that introduced the risk and had the better opportunity to control it.

The appeal was dismissed and the matter was sent back to trial to determine costs.

== See also ==
- List of Supreme Court of Canada cases (Lamer Court)
- Armory v Delamirie (1722), 1 Strange 505
- Jacobi v Griffiths, [1999] 2 SCR 570
- Lister v Hesley Hall Ltd, [2001] UKHL 22
