= Trevor Ivory Ltd v Anderson =

- Court: Court of Appeal
- Full case name: Trevor Ivory Limited & Anor v Anderson & Ors
- Decided: 20 December 1991
- Citation: [1992] 2 NZLR 517

Court membership
- Judges sitting: Cooke P, Hardie Boys and McGechan JJ

Keywords
- Negligent misstatement, Piercing the corporate veil, Director's liabilities, Corporate personality, Corporate law, assumption of responsibility

Trevor Ivory Ltd v Anderson is one of the leading New Zealand cases regarding the personal liability of company directors. The case concerns the personal liability of a director of a one-man company for negligent misstatement and applied the principle of Tesco Supermarkets Ltd v Nattrass that where a director is the "directing mind" of a company, his actions are legally those of the company. The application of the case by New Zealand courts during the leaky homes crisis has been described as a "barrier to litigants recovering from directors of these companies".

== Background ==
Trevor Ivory Ltd was a one-man company run by Trevor Ivory in the Nelson province and described as "agricultural and horticultural supplies and advisory service". In 1983, Trevor Ivory Limited entered into an oral contract with raspberry orchardists for the provision of consultancy services and the supply of sprays and fertilisers. The orchardists sought advice under the agreement about the spread of couch grass which was threatening their raspberry plantation and in March 1985 Mr Ivory recommended a trial spray of Roundup.

The trial spray had no immediate ill-effects and so Mr Ivory advised spraying all of the couch grass with Roundup. President Cooke described what happened thus,

Roundup is a powerful herbicide, well suited to killing couch grass but having the same effect on raspberry plants. Its use in the near vicinity of the plants was highly dangerous to them, especially when (as again the Judge found) no instructions were given by Mr Ivory to mow near and under the plants or otherwise remove any foliage from the plants near the ground. In the spring it was discovered that the crop had been seriously affected. Ultimately the raspberries had to be dug out. They were replaced by boysenberries.

— Cooke P, Trevor Ivory Ltd v Anderson

The raspberry orchardists sued Trevor Ivory in negligence and Heron J in the Nelson High Court found in their favour and awarded damages of $145,332 plus interest. The award of damages was made on the basis that the company was liable for breach of contract and negligent misstatement and that Mr Ivory was also personally liable for negligent misstatement.

Mr Ivory and Trevor Ivory Ltd appealed the decision that he was personally liable for negligent misstatement; the judges alleged failure to consider contributory negligence; and the quantum of damages. The Court of Appeal dismissed the appeal except on the question of personal liability.

== Judgments ==
The main point that the Court considered was whether Mr Ivory was personally liable for negligent advice given in the course of his company's operations. The unanimous decision of the Court was that Mr Ivory was not personally liable

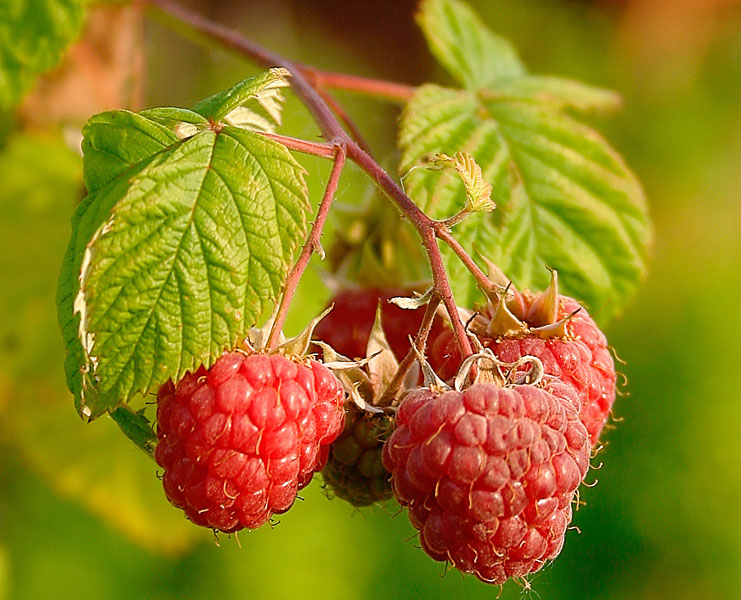
An orchard of raspberries had been killed by the negligent application of Roundup to a couch grass infestation.

=== Cooke P ===
In his judgement Cooke P restated the "elementary" law that "an incorporated company and any shareholder are separate legal entities, no matter that the shareholder may have absolute control."

Cooke P then surveyed Commonwealth case law that showed that a company officer or agent may, in certain circumstances, "come under a personal duty to a third party, breach of which ay entail personal liability".

In this field I agree with Nourse J (as he then was) in the White Horse case that it behoves the Courts to avoid imposing on the owner of a one-man company a personal duty of care which would erode the limited liability and separate identity principles associated with the names of Salomon and Lee. Viewing the issue as one of the assumption of a duty of care, which is the way in which Mr Fogarty for the respondents rightly asked us to view it, I cannot think it reasonable to say that Mr Ivory assumed a duty of care to the plaintiffs as if he were carrying on business on his own account and not through a company.

— Cooke P, Trevor Ivory Ltd V Anderson

Expanding on this point Cooke P noted,

Without venturing further into what some would see as unduly theoretical, it not heterodox, I commit myself to the opinion that, when he formed his company, Mr Ivory made it plain to all the world that limited liability was intended. Possibly the plaintiffs gave little thought to that in entering into the consultancy contract; but such a limitation is a common fact of business and, in relation to economic loss and duties of care, the consequences should in my view be accepted in the absence of special circumstances. It is not to be doubted that, in relation to an obligation to give careful and skilful advice, the owner of a one-man company may assume personal responsibility. Fairline is an analogy. But it seems to me that something special is required to justify putting a case in that class. To attempt to define in advance what might be sufficiently special would be a contradiction in terms. What can be said is that there is nothing out of the ordinary here.

— Cooke P, Trevor Ivory Ltd V Anderson

=== Hardie Boys J ===
In his own judgement Justice Hardie Boys discussed the central importance of a director assuming responsibility, either expressly or by imputation and, noted the current case was "approaching the borderline" and that, "It may be that in the present case there would have been a sufficient assumption of responsibility had Mr Ivory undertaken to do the spraying himself, but it is not necessary to consider that possibility."

Hardie Boys J stated that one of the key hurdles in this area of law was establishing that a director owed a personal duty of care because his acts were his acts as the agent of the company and not of the company itself.

“What does run counter to the purposes and effect of incorporation is a failure to recognise the two capacities in which directors may act; that in appropriate circumstances they are to be identified with the company itself, so that their acts are in truth the company’s acts. Indeed I consider that the nature of corporate personality requires that this identification normally be the basic premise and that clear evidence be needed to displace it with a finding that a director is not acting as the company but as the company’s agent or servant in a way that renders him personally liable.”

— Hardie Boys J, Trevor Ivory Ltd V Anderson

This could happen in certain situations, Hardie Boys J believed, "Assumption of responsibility may well arise or be imputed where the director or employee exercises particular control or control over a particular operation or activity".

=== McGechan J ===
Justice McGechan concurred with the rest of the Court, expressly noting of the argument given by counsel for the raspberry orchardists, "It may indeed be drawing the long bow to apply a Hedley Byrne approach so as to impose personal liability upon the managing director of a one-man company, in rural New Zealand".

When it comes to assumption of responsibility, I do not accept a company director of a one-man company is to be regarded as automatically accepting tort responsibility for advice given on behalf of the company by himself. There may be situations where such liability tends to arise, particularly perhaps where the director as a person is highly prominent and his company is barely visible, resulting in a focus predominantly on the man himself. All will depend upon the facts of individual cases, and the degree of implicit assumption of personal responsibility, with no doubt some policy elements also applying. I do not think this is such a case, although it approaches the line.

— McGechan J, Trevor Ivory Ltd V Anderson

== Significance ==
The case remains the benchmark in New Zealand law for establishing whether a director's action are those of the company or those of herself as an individual. However this area of law, which has received frequent attention due to the leaky homes crisis, remains unstable. The importance of the case has been eroded by the decision of the Court of Appeal in Body Corporate 202254 v Taylor [2009] 2 NZLR 17. As two commercial law academics reported, "New Zealand cases subsequent to Trevor Ivory have done little but create uncertainty for litigants. The courts’ approaches have varied widely with some judges applying Trevor Ivory and others making every effort to distinguish it."
