= Lister v Romford Ice and Cold Storage Co Ltd =

UK legal case

Lister v Romford Ice Co Ltd
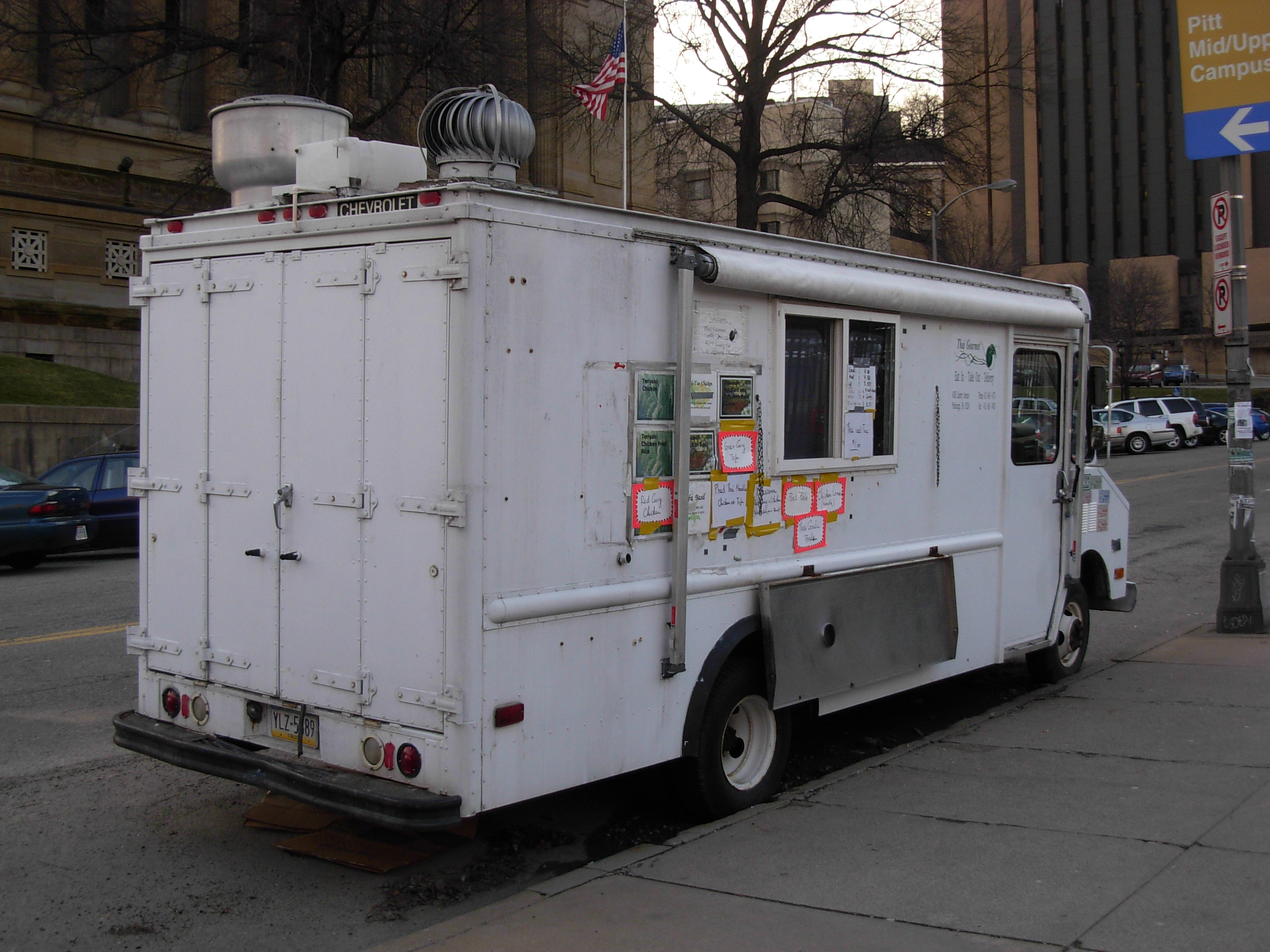
- Court: House of Lords
- Citations: [1956] UKHL 6, [1957] AC 555

Case history
- Prior action: [1956] 2 QB 180

Court membership
- Judges sitting: Viscount Simonds, Lord Morton of Henryton, Lord Radcliffe, Lord Tucker and Lord Somervell of Harrow.

Keywords
- Vicarious liability, subrogation

Lister v Romford Ice and Cold Storage Co Ltd [1956] UKHL 6 is an important English tort law, contract law and labour law, which concerns vicarious liability and an ostensible duty of an employee to compensate the employer for torts he commits in the course of employment.

== Facts ==
Martin Lister and his father Martin Lister were working for the Cold Storage company, driving a waste disposal lorry. They went to a slaughterhouse on Old Church Road, Romford. When they were entering through the gates to the yard, the father got out ahead and the son, driving, backed over him. McNair J awarded the father two thirds of the compensation to reflect the father’s contributory negligence. The insurers, who paid £1,600 and costs, sued the son in the name of the company (which was not consulted) by right of subrogation to indemnify them for this sum.

== Judgment ==
=== Court of Appeal ===
The majority of the Court of Appeal ([1956] 2 QB 180), Birkett LJ and Romer LJ, held that the insurance company could seek contribution from the son, because the son had a contractual duty of care and skill and it was not permissible to imply a term that no indemnity could be sought.

Denning LJ dissented. After describing the facts he went on as follows.

There can be little doubt that this action was a surprise both to the Cold Storage Company and to the son. Mr. Lister junior is now 33 and he has been employed by the company ever since he was 16. When he was 17 the directors asked him to take a driving test, and, after he had passed it, they asked him to drive the company's lorries. He has driven for them ever since, except when he was away on war service. The company have never suggested to him that he ought to insure himself. He took it for granted that he was fully covered by his employers. The managing director evidently thought the same. He was subpoenaed to give evidence on the son's behalf. He said that it never occurred to him that the company's motor drivers would be personally responsible: and he never suggested to them that they should cover themselves separately. The parties to this action are clearly of one mind about it, but the insurers think differently. They want the son to indemnify them out of his own pocket.

Let me put aside for the moment the question of insurance and treat the case as if the Cold Storage Company were the real plaintiffs. Even so, there was until very recently never a case of this kind recorded in our books. Many a master has been made responsible for the mistakes of his servants, but never has he sought to get contribution or indemnity from his servants. One obvious reason is that it is not worth while. The master is not allowed to make any deduction from his servant's wages: and it would seem the extreme of harshness to seize his savings or to make him bankrupt. The other reason is no doubt the reluctance of a good master to visit the risk of accidents on to his servants. The risk should be borne by the undertaking as a whole rather than by the servant who happens to make a mistake, especially when he is working his master's machine. The master takes the profits from using the machine and should bear the responsibility for the damage it does, even though the damage would not happen without some human error. It seems that these reasons no longer commend themselves to employers, or rather to their insurers, and we have to consider whether the claim is good in law.

At the outset Mr. Christopher Shawcross, for the son, took a preliminary objection to the proceedings. He pointed out that when the Cold Storage Company were sued by the father, if they wished to claim indemnity from the son, the appropriate way for them to do it would have been to issue a third party notice against the son. The judge could then in the one action have assessed the share of responsibility which attached to the father, the son and the company respectively. But instead of issuing a third party notice the company proceeded by means of a separate writ against the son: and they issued this writ, it is said, a week too soon. They issued it before the action against them was tried and before they were found liable themselves. They issued their writ against the son on January 23, 1953, but they were not found liable to the father until January 29, 1953. Mr. Shawcross argued that on this account the action was premature. The Cold Storage Company ought, he said, to have waited until they had actually been found liable to the father and then to have brought their action against the son.

At the hearing before this court everyone agreed that it was undesirable that the substantive claim should go off on a technical point of this kind. We therefore gave leave for a second action to be brought and consolidated with the first action, the pleadings and evidence in the first action to stand as if they had taken place in the second action. This was done, and we are able to deal with the merits of the case. Nevertheless, we still have to decide the preliminary point, because many costs depend upon it.

In order to decide this point, and indeed the other points in the case, it is necessary to decide what is the true basis of an action like this by a master against his servant. Is it an action of contract, or of tort, or is it only given by statute?

So far as contract is concerned it is not suggested that the servant ever agreed to indemnify his master, either expressly or impliedly, against this liability - he never agreed to any such thing - but it is suggested that the servant impliedly agreed to use reasonable care: and that an action lies by the master for breach of that contract. This is a possible way of formulating the claim. Indeed, I suggested it myself in Jones v Manchester Corporation, but, on reconsideration, I do not think it is the correct way, for the simple reason that it does not truly represent the facts. When a man holds himself out as a skilled man he thereby impliedly warrants that he is competent at his work, see Harmer v Cornelius, but he does not warrant that he will use reasonable care. That would be equivalent, in many cases, to a warranty that he will never make a mistake and I know of no case where it has been so held. If a lorry driver has an accident owing to a moment's inadvertence or a slight error of judgment, and a third person is injured, his employer must pay damages. The law imposes a very high standard of care in such cases. But it is going much too far to say that the driver is thereby in breach of a contract with his employer. No man, if asked, would give a warranty to his employer that he would at all times, without exception, come up to the standard of the reasonable man of the law who, so far as I know, when he is driving, never makes a slip or a mistake. The ordinary man would say "I will do my best; I cannot do more"; and that could hardly be said to be a contract by him. It would not be intended to create legal relations.

Take the converse case, where a servant is injured by the negligence of his employer; for instance, the father's claim against the Cold Storage Company. The liability of the employer is always regarded as a liability in tort, not in contract. The history of this subject shows the courts gradually putting a heavier liability on the master: and they have done it by developing the law, not by altering the contract. If you read through the whole of Wilsons & Clyde Coal Co Ltd v English, you will not find a word to suggest that the employer's liability nowadays rests on an implied term in the contract. The obligation of the employer is an obligation imposed by the law. It arises out of the relationship of master and servant, not out of any implied promise to use reasonable care. The defences open to the master too, contributory negligence and so forth, are all regulated by the law and not by the contract. The employer was at one time given the defence of common employment on the supposition of a contract, but that fiction has now been abolished. It bedevilled the law long enough and should serve as a warning not to imply promises contrary to the fact. If there is no implied promise of care by master to servant, so also there is none by servant to master.

Another objection to the implied contract is that it would mean that the master could sue his servant for negligence although the master suffered no damage. That cannot be right. It is trite knowledge that an action for breach of contract lies without proof of damage, whereas in the tort of negligence damage is essential. Test the position by taking the simple case where a servant negligently injures his master's person or property. Suppose, for instance, that a domestic servant carelessly breaks a plate whilst she is washing up the dinner things; or a chauffeur by his negligent driving injures his master, who is riding in the car. The master in each case can claim damages for negligence; see Digby v General Accident Fire and Life Assurance Corporation Ltd; but damage is, I think, the gist of the action. If the domestic servant was careless but broke nothing, the master would have no cause of action. If the chauffeur inadvertently failed to keep a good look out, but there was no accident, the master could not sue him for damages. He would not even be able to dismiss him, because it is not every piece of carelessness which justifies dismissal. There must be something gross or persistent about it before it will amount to misconduct such as to justify dismissal.

All this leads me to think that the action against a servant must be founded on tort; and when you turn to the books you will find that there are many authorities, old and new, which go to support this view. In 1534 FitzHerbert, in his New Natura Brevium 94D, said that "if a smith prick my horse with a nail ... I shall have my action upon the case against him, without any warranty by the smith to do it well ... for it is the duty of every artificer to exercise his art rightly and truly as he ought." In 1802, in Govett v Radnidge, where the defendant undertook to load a hogshead of treacle on a cart, but, in doing so, negligently broke it open, Lord Ellenborough said that the action was founded "on neglect of duty and not upon breach of promise." In 1895, in Taylor v Manchester, Sheffield and Lincolnshire Railway Co Ltd, where a passenger was injured by the negligence of the railway company who were carrying him under contract, it was held that the action was founded on tort. In 1952, in Jackson v Mayfair Window Cleaning Co Ltd, where cleaners were cleaning a chandelier under contract with the owner, but carelessly broke it, Barry J. held that the owner's claim was founded on tort and not on contract. Those were cases where the negligence occurred in carrying out a contract for services. All the more so when it occurs in a contract of service. I am aware that an action for negligence against a solicitor is founded on contract (see (Groom v Crocker, but that is very different, because there is no physical damage and the duty arises out of contract only: see Candler v Crane, Christmas & Co.

Now take the case where the servant's negligence does not injure the master himself, but a third person. If the master is sued by the third person and found liable, the master's claim against the servant does not properly lie in contract in this case any more than it does in the other. Indeed, in the one case where it was suggested that the master might have a remedy, it was put by Warrington LJ upon a breach of duty by the servant, not upon a breach of contract: see Weld-Blundell v Stephens. Here again, test the position by seeing whether damage is an essential ingredient. Can the master sue the servant before any claim is made upon him or before he knows that he is liable to the third person? I think not. Take the facts of this very case, but suppose that it had happened before 1945. Under the law as it then existed the father would have had no claim against the Cold Storage Company at all. He would have been defeated by his own contributory negligence and by the doctrine of common employment. Can anyone suppose that at common law the Cold Storage Company could have sued the son for negligence when the company were under no liability themselves? Clearly not. Damage must be the gist of the action here, too. This shows that the action does not lie in contract, but, if it lies at all, it is in tort.

So far as tort is concerned, I find it difficult to see how the law of tort can give an indemnity to the master. The master is made liable for a tort. Can he sue his servant for the self same tort? The common law regards the master as a tortfeasor: see The Koursk, per Scrutton LJ. The case comes within the rule that there is no contribution between tortfeasors. There is, of course, an exception which permits an innocent person to claim contribution or indemnity, but that exception only applies where the innocent person can rely on a contract for contribution or indemnity, express or implied. The master has no such contract. I do not think, therefore, that the common law would have permitted the master to sue in tort.

So far as statute is concerned, however, it is clear that the master has a remedy. By section 6 of the Act of 1935 Parliament has given the master a right to contribution or indemnity from his servant whenever it is just and equitable that he should have it. A master is clearly a tortfeasor within that section. In every case where the owner of a vehicle which is driven by a servant claims contribution from another vehicle he claims as a tortfeasor, because it is only to a "tortfeasor" that the right to contribution is given.

It is significant that the only cases in the books in which a remedy has been given are cases under the statute. There is no recorded case where a master has sued his servant at common law for contribution or indemnity. But even supposing that there was a remedy at common law, I do not think it can survive the Act of 1935. That Act covered the ground so fully that it cannot be supposed that Parliament intended that a separate and distinct remedy should still remain at common law. Are we now, I would ask, to set about the task of defining a remedy which has never been defined before in the whole 800 years of the common law? It would, I suggest, be a work of supererogation to embark on such a task. When Parliament has stated the principle to be applied in a given situation, the lawyers should not proceed to write another one of their own.

In the result I adhere to the view which I stated in Jones v Manchester Corporation that "In the absence of an express contract on the matter, the master has no right at law to an indemnity or contribution from his servant. It is entirely a matter for the discretion of the court under the Act of 1935 whether it should order any, and, if so, what contribution or indemnity between them."

If this is right, it means that the preliminary point succeeds. It has been decided that under the statute a master's claim does not arise until his liability is ascertained by judgment or admission (see George Wimpey & Co Ltd v British Overseas Airways Corporation, and even if he had a claim at common law it likewise does not arise until he has suffered damage.

I turn, therefore, to the merits of the case. Under the statute, if there had not been any insurance questions involved, the task of the court would have been comparatively simple, namely, to find out what would be just and equitable as between master and servant having regard to the extent of their respective responsibility for the damage and to order the son to pay his proper share: see section 6 (2) of the Act of 1935. But this case is much complicated by the insurance factor.

The Cold Storage Company were insured under two policies. First, they were insured against liability to their employees under an employers' liability policy. Secondly, they were insured against liability for motor accidents under a motor-vehicle policy which enured for the benefit of themselves and their drivers, but it did not cover liability to their employees. The father's claim was clearly covered by the employers' liability policy. The insurers have paid under that policy and are the real plaintiffs in the action.

Mr. Patrick O'Connor invited us to ignore this question of insurance, but I do not think we should blind ourselves in this way. It is undoubtedly true as a general rule that the court is not concerned with the fact that the plaintiff is insured or that he has been paid by his insurance company. That has been so ever since the days of Lord Mansfield; but it is equally true that the insurers who stand behind the action take their plaintiff as they find him, and if he is, for some reason or other, debarred from making a claim, they fall with him. See Simpson v Thomson.

It is one thing to say that, as between strangers, insurance is irrelevant, but quite another thing to say that as between master and servant it is irrelevant. If the master relies on an implied contract to make the servant liable, the servant may well rely on an implied term to exempt himself.

What, I ask, is the position when an insurance company brings an action against a servant, without the employer having any say in the matter? Take this very case, where the insurers issue a writ in the employer's name against the servant without consulting either the employer or the servant beforehand. When the servant receives the writ he will take it to his employer and say "Why are you suing me? Surely you have got the money from your insurance company. So you cannot sue me." This natural comment between master and man throws a flood of light on the implied understanding of the parties. When the man was taken on, he knew that his employer was insured. If anyone standing by were to ask what was to happen if the servant was involved in an accident, both employer and man would say at once "The insurance company will pay." They would not expect that the man would have to pay out of his own pocket. This shows that there is an implied term in these cases whereby, if the employer is insured, he will not seek to recover contribution or indemnity from the servant. I cannot help thinking that the insurers undertook the risk on the very same understanding. The premium was fixed no doubt on the basis that they would foot the bill themselves. No allowance would be made for the possibility of any contribution being obtained from the Cold Storage Company's servants. Yet, if this action is well founded, it means that in every one of these cases the insurance company can turn round and bring an action in the name of the employer against the servant. Nothing could be more detrimental to good relations between an employer and his servants. Nothing could be further from the contemplation of the parties.

In my opinion, no such action lies. If and in so far as the claim rests in contract, which I dispute, it is defeated by the implied term which I have just mentioned. The implied term which exempts the servant is just as plausible as the implied term which makes him liable. If and in so far as the claim rests on the statute, it comes within the express power of the court "to exempt any person from liability to make contribution." This seems to me to be an appropriate case in which the court should exercise this power. Whichever way it is put, however, I am clearly of opinion that an employer, who has been fully indemnified by his own insurance company, should not be allowed to turn round and sue his servant for a contribution or indemnity. It follows that I do not agree with the decision of Semtex Ltd v Gladstone.

That is sufficient to decide this case; but in case I am wrong on this point, I go on to consider the further argument based on the provisions for compulsory insurance under the Road Traffic Acts. Mr. Christopher Shawcross on behalf of the son said that, under those Acts, the driver should have been insured against liability not only to the public but also to his fellow-servants. It follows, on the one hand, that if the employer did not effect such an insurance, he was guilty of a breach of his duty towards the driver and could not recover in this action; but, on the other hand, if the employer had effected an insurance to cover the driver, the servant would have the benefit of it and the employer could not sue him.

This raises a question of the first importance. It depends on the true interpretation of section 35 (1) of the Road Traffic Act 1930, which is in these terms: "Subject to the provisions of this Part of this Act, it shall not be lawful for any person to use, or to cause or permit any other person to use, a motor vehicle on a road unless there is in force in relation to the user of the vehicle by that person or that other person, as the case may be, such a policy of insurance or such a security in respect of third-party risks as complies with the requirements of this Part of this Act." The problem is to apply that section to the various cases which arise when a servant is driving a motor-vehicle belonging to his master. It seems to me that when a master employs a servant to drive his motor-vehicle and the servant drives it, in the course of his employment, then the master is using the vehicle and so is the servant. Both of them are using it. In such cases it is important to distinguish between the master's user and the servant's user. So far as the user by the master is concerned, if he can point to an effective policy of insurance which covers the user by him of the vehicle at the material time, then no offence is committed by the master. That was the position in John T. Ellis Ltd v Hinds, when a youth of 16 drove a car for his employers without having a driving licence. The employers were in fact quite innocent people. The youth had deceived them into thinking that he was of age and held a driving licence. Upon examining the insurance policy the court held that the user by the employers was covered by the policy because they did not know that the youth did not hold a driving licence. They were, therefore, not guilty of an offence. But the youth himself was, I think, clearly guilty of an offence under the section. The user of the vehicle by him (as distinct from the user by his employers) was not covered by insurance. He could not escape by relying on their innocent use of the vehicle when his own use of it was guilty.

Next take the case where a servant is driving a car on a frolic of his own outside the course of his employment. In that case the servant is using the car but the master is not using it; nor is the master causing or permitting it to be used. The master is not caught by section 35 (1) at all. He is not bound to have a policy covering such user: see the observations of Lord Goddard CJ in Ellis v Hinds, when commenting on Sutch v Burns. The driver is, however, caught by section 35 (1) because he is a person using the car and his user ought to be covered by insurance. He is guilty of an offence unless he has taken out a policy covering his user, which he will not usually have done. The injured party will not suffer, however, because it is a case where the Act requires the liability to be covered by insurance and, as such, the Motor Insurers' Bureau will pay the injured party just as if the driver had taken out a policy as he ought to have done.

The present case is the difficult one when a servant injures a fellow-servant. Suppose that a servant, whilst driving in the course of his employment, runs down a fellow-servant in the road. In that case the master is using the vehicle and so is the servant. Both are using it. But the effect of the section is different for each. We must consider the master's user separately from the servant's user. (1) The master's user. So far as the master's user is concerned, he is not bound to have a motor policy which covers injury to his own employees: see section 36 (1) (b) (i) of the Act. The reason is, no doubt, because his responsibility to his own employees is discharged by his contribution to the National Insurance Fund or by his employers' liability policy. (2) The servant's user. So far as the servant's user is concerned, there must, I think, be a policy in force which covers him in case of injury to his fellow-servants. The section says that it is not lawful for him to use a motor-vehicle on the road unless there is in force, in relation to the user by him, such a policy of insurance against third party risks as complies with the Act. When you are considering the user by him, the fact that he is a servant is irrelevant. His user must be covered just the same as if he were not a servant. The policy must cover his user of the vehicle, no matter whom he runs down. It makes no difference that he runs down a fellow-servant. He must be covered for that risk. (3) The master's causing or permitting. The section also makes it an offence to "cause or permit any other person" to use a motor-vehicle on the road unless there is in force, in relation to the user by that person, such a policy of insurance as complies with the Act. When that section is applied to the use by a servant, it is plain that a master must not cause or permit his servant to use the lorry unless there is in force, in relation to the servant's user, a policy which complies with the Act; that is, a policy such as I have described under (2) above, which covers injuries to his fellow-servants. This means that an employer's motor policy, in order to comply with the Act, should be extended so as to cover cases where his servants, whilst driving in the course of their employment, cause injuries to others, including their fellow-servants.

I appreciate that in Lees v Motor Insurers' Bureau Lord Goddard CJ held that a servant need not be covered for injury to his fellow-servants: but he seems to have approached the case on the footing that, in such a case, there was only user by one person, namely, the master, and that, so long as there was a policy in force in relation to the master's user, the Act was satisfied. I am quite clear, however, that, in addition to the user by the master, there is at the same time a user by the servant. Under the Act there must be a policy in force in relation to the servant's user also, and this must cover fellow-servants. The authority of Lees v Motor Insurers' Bureau is greatly impaired by the fact that, when an appeal was brought to this court, the bureau did not resist it, but preferred to pay the widow her full claim and costs. I do not think that the decision in Lees v Motor Insurers' Bureau was correct.

What is then the position? When the Cold Storage Co. sent the son out with his lorry, they ought to have seen that there was in force a policy which covered his user of it in respect of claims by anyone, including his fellow-servants. The Act required that the son should be insured against this very risk. It would have been unlawful for the Cold Storage Co. to send him out uncovered. It was a necessary implication in his contract of employment that the company would not ask him to do anything unlawful, and thus it was implied that the company would see that his user was covered by insurance: see Gregory v Ford. That means that he would not be called upon personally to pay.

I do not stop to consider whether the Romford Cold Storage Co. did fulfil their obligation in this case. There is much to be said for the view that the motor policy did cover their servants in respect of injuries to fellow-servants. The wording of the policy is ambiguous, but it might well be construed so as to give the cover which the company were bound in law to effect. See Richards v Cox. But whether the motor policy did or did not cover the son, the Cold Storage Co. cannot claim an indemnity against the son when they were under an obligation to see that he was covered.

Mr. Patrick O'Connor submitted, however, that all this discussion about the Road Traffic Act was beside the mark, because this particular accident did not occur on a road but in a yard. I do not think that it can be put on one side in this fashion. Mr. Christopher Shawcross gave, I think, the correct answer when he pointed out that, in order to comply with the Act, the motor policy had to cover "injury to any person caused by or arising out of the user of the vehicle on a road": see section 36 (1) (b) . The injury to the father was not caused by the use of the lorry on a road, but it did, I think, arise out of it. The lorry was used for transport on roads and, in the ordinary course of its work, it had to pull into yards and forecourts, and so forth, so as to load and unload. Many accidents may occur whilst so doing. It would be very strange if there was no obligation to insure the lorry during these incidental operations. If an accident happened whilst it was backing from a public road into a private drive, so as to turn, the injury would clearly arise out of the use of the vehicle on a road. So, also, if it is backing from a main road into a private yard so as to load or unload; and that is this case. I agree that if the lorry was being used for something unconnected with road transport, as, for instance, if it was taking fodder to animals across a field, or if it had been in the yard a week and was not being used outside, there would be no need to insure it. But when it is engaged in operations incidental or ancillary to a journey on a road, then any injury during those operations arises, I think, out of the use of the vehicle on a road and must be covered by insurance. It seems that the insurance companies accept this view, because I notice that all motor policies in common form cover the use of motor-vehicles anywhere, not only on a road, but also in a yard or elsewhere. Any other view would make a deplorable gap in our system of compulsory insurance.

My conclusion is that the employers in this case were bound under the Act to insure the son in regard to this injury to the father, and being so bound they cannot claim indemnity from the son now. In my opinion the appeal should be allowed; in the first action on the ground that it was premature; in the second action (1) on the ground that a master, who has himself recovered indemnity from his insurers, cannot go on to recover indemnity from his servants; (2) on the ground that under the Road Traffic Act the company were bound to insure the son against this injury to his father.

=== House of Lords ===
The House of Lords held by a bare majority (Lord Radcliffe and Lord Somervell of Harrow dissenting) that contracts of employment contain an implied term that an employee owes a duty to take reasonable care of the employer's property and in the performance of his tasks. So the lorry, which was entrusted to him, was used carelessly when Martin ran over his father. This meant the son was responsible, and because no term could be implied that an employee may be indemnified by the employer or his insurance, the son would have to pay the insurance company back.

Lord Morton said the following on implied terms.

Counsel for the appellant sought to find some justification for implying one or other of these terms in the particular circumstances of the appellant's employment with the respondents, but I can find nothing in these circumstances which should differentiate the appellant from any other young man who, having passed the necessary driving test, is employed to drive a motor lorry. I add that the appellant had been driving motor lorries for the respondents for about 10 years before the accident happened.

If any such term is to be implied in this case, it must surely be implied in all cases where an employee is employed to drive any kind of vehicle which might cause damage to third parties. and the implied term cannot be limited to cases where the vehicle is being driven on a public highway, for the accident in the present case occurred in a yard. Surely it must logically extend to cases such as a crane driver in factory premises, and many other cases come to mind which cannot logically be distinguished from the present case.

Such an obligation might have been imposed on the employer by statute, and it is perhaps of some significance that the legislature did not take this course when the law was so strikingly altered by the Road Traffic Act, 1930.

It cannot be said, in my view, that the implication of either of these terms is necessary in order to give "to the transaction such efficacy as both parties must have intended that at all events it should have" (The Moorcock).

Lord Tucker, in the course of his judgment, set out the incidents of a "master-servant" relationship.

(1) the duty to give reasonable notice in the absence of custom or express agreement; (2) the duty to obey lawful orders of the master; (3) the duty to be honest and diligent in the master’s service (4) the duty to take reasonable care of his master’s property entrusted to him and generally in the performance of his duties; (5) to account to his master for any secret commission or remuneration received by him; (6) not to abuse his master’s confidence in matters pertaining to his services.

== See also ==
- Morris v Ford Motor Co Ltd [1973] 1 QB 792, Court of Appeal very close to refusing to follow Lister
- Williams v Natural Life Health Foods Ltd, English case where Lord Steyn implicitly overrules Lister
- Douglas v Kinger, 2008 ONCA 452, Canadian case doubting Lister
- London Drugs Ltd v Kuehne & Nagel International Ltd, La Forest J, dissenting, disapproving Lister
