= Yewens v Noakes =

Yewens V. Noakes
- Court: Exchequer Court
- Decided: 1880
- Citation: 6 QBD 530

Case history
- Appealed from: Court of Appeal decision: that a clerk who earned £150 a year did not fall within the definition of servant.
- Related action: Contract of Employment

Court membership
- Judges sitting: Lord Justice Bramwell and Lord Justice Thesiger

Case opinions
- Decision by: Bramwell: "a servant is a person who is subject to the command of his master as to the manner in which he shall do his work."
- Concurrence: Thesiger said it was obvious that a salaried clerk was not a "servant" any more than were "the manager of a bank, a foreman with high wages, persons in the position almost of gentlemen."

Keywords
- Tax law

Yewens v Noakes (1880) 6 QBD 530, was an English tax law case which addressed the question of the division between master and servant.

== Facts ==
There was a statutory exemption for duty on inhabited houses where premises were occupied by 'a servant or other person.... for the protection thereof.'

== Judgment ==
The Court of Appeal held that a clerk who earned £150 a year did not fall within the definition of servant.

Lord Justice Bramwell gave judgment said, "a servant is a person who is subject to the command of his master as to the manner in which he shall do his work."

Lord Justice Thesiger said it was obvious that a salaried clerk was not a "servant" any more than were "the manager of a bank, a foreman with high wages, persons in the position almost of gentlemen."

== See also ==
- Contract of employment
- UK labour law
