= Legal doctrine =

Set of rules or procedures through which judgements can be determined in a legal case

A legal doctrine is a framework, set of rules, test, or procedural steps — often established through precedent in the common law — through which judgments can be determined in a given legal case. For example, a legal doctrine comes about when a judge makes a ruling where a process is outlined and applied, and allows for the ruling to be equally applied to like cases. When enough judges make use of the process, it may become established as the de facto method of deciding like situations.

== Examples ==
Examples of legal doctrines include:

Doctrine	Definition and use
Faithless servant	Under the laws of a number of states in the United States, and most notably New York State law, an employee who acts unfaithfully towards his employer must forfeit all of the compensation he received during the period of his disloyalty. It is a very old common law doctrine that springs out of agency law.
Fundamental breach, also known as fundamental term or repudiatory breach	Under English common law, performance may be held to be so substandard that the party injured by the breach is to be exonerated from the performance even if the contract specifically requires performance in the face of a breach. It is an extension of the doctrine of deviation.
Laches	Under English common law, a court may refuse to hear a case not brought before it after a lengthy period since the right of action arose. The doctrine of laches is intended to prevent injustice to the defendant because of the plaintiff reserving action for the time most convenient or advantageous for them.
Substantial performance	A rule of equity in which, by contrast to fundamental breach, a contract that is substantially performed before a breach occurs may still be upheld to the benefit of the defendant. It is used by courts to prevent the injured party from taking unfair advantage of the party that breached after a portion of the contract has been performed.
Attribution	A series of doctrines (such as vicarious liability and common purpose) allowing an actor to be held liable for actions he did not actually commit.
Tipsy Coachman	A principle of appellate law that allows an appellate court to affirm a trial court that reaches the right result but for the wrong reasons, so long as there is any basis which would support the judgment in the record.

== See also ==
- Cogitationis poenam nemo patitur
- Concept
- Constitutional economics
- Constitutionalism
- Ex aequo et bono
- Legal fiction
- Legal precedent
- Rule according to higher law
