= Dubai Aluminium Co Ltd v Salaam =

English tort law case

- Court: House of Lords
- Citations: [2002] UKHL 48, [2003] 2 AC 366

Keywords
- Vicarious Liability

Dubai Aluminium Co Ltd v Salaam [2002] UKHL 48 is an English vicarious liability case, concerning also breach of trust and dishonest assistance.

== Facts ==
Salaam's solicitors were seeking contribution for damages because of their former client. Mr Salaam had defrauded Dubai Aluminium Co Ltd. Mr Salaam's solicitors were Amhurst Brown Martin & Nicholson, and they had drafted documents for him. Amhurst's had been sued and had settled a $10m claim. Then, they sought contribution from Mr Salaam under the Civil Liability (Contribution) Act 1978. This required showing that Amhurst's was liable for wrongful acts by Mr Anthony Amhurst, under the Partnership Act 1890 section 10.

== Judgment ==
=== Court of Appeal ===
The majority of the Court of Appeal, Evans LJ and Aldous LJ, held that the firm was not vicariously liable for the dishonest acts of Mr Salaam, and so was not entitled to a contribution from Mr Salaam for settling the claim by Dubai Aluminium.

Turner J dissented. Mr Salaam argued that wrongful acts that a partnership was vicariously liable for only extended to common law torts, not equitable wrongs like dishonest participation in a breach of trust. Jonathan Sumption QC acted for the solicitors.

=== House of Lords ===
The House of Lords held that Amhurst's was entitled to a contribution (which amounted to indemnity) from Mr Salaam. The 1890 Act was not restricted to tortious wrongs, and Mr Amhurst's actions were in the ordinary course of the business (Lister v Hesley Hall Ltd). So the firm was jointly liable for the damage, and Rix J had been wrong to take account of the firm's innocence when assessing Mr Salaam's contribution for a settlement. Given that Mr Salaam still possessed the proceeds of fraud it was equitable for him to pay the surplus for the firm's $10m liability.

Lord Nicholls gave the first judgment and said the following on vicarious liability:

20. Take the present case. The essence of the claim advanced by Dubai Aluminium against Mr Amhurst is that he and Mr Salaam engaged in a criminal conspiracy to defraud Dubai Aluminium. Mr Amhurst drafted the consultancy agreement and other agreements in furtherance of this conspiracy. Needless to say, Mr Amhurst had no authority from his partners to conduct himself in this manner. Nor is there any question of conduct of this nature being part of the ordinary course of the business of the Amhurst firm. Mr Amhurst had authority to draft commercial agreements. He had no authority to draft a commercial agreement for the dishonest purpose of furthering a criminal conspiracy.

21. However, this latter fact does not of itself mean that the firm is exempt from liability for his wrongful conduct. Whether an act or omission was done in the ordinary course of a firm's business cannot be decided simply by considering whether the partner was authorised by his co-partners to do the very act he did. The reason for this lies in the legal policy underlying vicarious liability. The underlying legal policy is based on the recognition that carrying on a business enterprise necessarily involves risks to others. It involves the risk that others will be harmed by wrongful acts committed by the agents through whom the business is carried on. When those risks ripen into loss, it is just that the business should be responsible for compensating the person who has been wronged.

22. This policy reason dictates that liability for agents should not be strictly confined to acts done with the employer's authority. Negligence can be expected to occur from time to time. Everyone makes mistakes at times. Additionally, it is a fact of life, and therefore to be expected by those who carry on businesses, that sometimes their agents may exceed the bounds of their authority or even defy express instructions. It is fair to allocate risk of losses thus arising to the businesses rather than leave those wronged with the sole remedy, of doubtful value, against the individual employee who committed the wrong. To this end, the law has given the concept of 'ordinary course of employment' an extended scope.

Lord Millett gave a concurring judgment. In obiter dicta he said that the claim could be based on dishonesty, like for liability in assisting breach of trust. At the same time it could ‘be based simply on the receipt, treating it as a restitutionary claim independent of any wrongdoing.’

Lord Hobhouse gave a short concurring judgment.

Lord Slynn agreed with Lord Nicholls.

Lord Hutton agreed with Lord Nicholls and Lord Millett.
