= Vicarious liability =

Extended liability to parties that had to control violators

Vicarious liability is a form of a strict, secondary liability that arises under the common law doctrine of agency, respondeat superior, the responsibility of the superior for the acts of their subordinate or, in a broader sense, the responsibility of any third party that had the "right, ability, or duty to control" the activities of a violator. It can be distinguished from contributory liability, another form of secondary liability, which is rooted in the tort theory of enterprise liability because, unlike contributory infringement, knowledge is not an element of vicarious liability. The law has developed the view that some relationships by their nature require the person who engages others to accept responsibility for the wrongdoing of those others. The most important such relationship for practical purposes is that of employer and employee.

== Employers' liability ==
Employers are vicariously liable, under the respondeat superior doctrine, for negligent acts or omissions by their employees in the course of employment (sometimes referred to as 'scope and course of employment'). To determine whether the employer is liable, the difference between an independent contractor and an employee is to be drawn. In order to be vicariously liable, there must be a requisite relationship between the defendant and the tortfeasor, which could be examined by three tests: Control test, Organisation test, and Sufficient relationship test. An employer may be held liable under principles of vicarious liability if an employee does an authorized act in an unauthorized way.

Employers may also be liable under the common law principle represented in the Latin phrase, qui facit per alium facit per se (one who acts through another acts oneself). That is a parallel concept to vicarious liability and strict liability, in which one person is held liable in criminal law or tort for the acts or omissions of another.

In Australia, the 'sufficient relationship' test, entailing the balancing of several factors such as skill levels required in the job, pay schemes, and degree of control granted to the worker, has been the favoured approach. For an act to be considered within the course of employment, it must either be authorized or be so connected with an authorized act that it can be considered a mode, though an improper mode, of performing it.

Courts sometimes distinguish between an employee's "detour" vs. "a frolic of their own". For instance, an employer will be held liable if it is shown that the employee had gone on a mere detour in carrying out their duties, such as stopping to buy a beverage or use an automated teller machine while running a work-related errand, whereas an employee acting in their own right rather than on the employer's business is undertaking a "frolic" and will not subject the employer to liability.

== Principals' liability ==
The owner of an automobile can be held vicariously liable for negligence committed by a person to whom the car has been lent, as if the owner was a principal and the driver their agent, if the driver is using the car primarily for the purpose of performing a task for the owner. Courts have been reluctant to extend this liability to the owners of other kinds of chattel. For example, the owner of a plane will not be vicariously liable for the actions of a pilot to whom he or she has lent it to perform the owner's purpose. In the United States, vicarious liability for automobiles has since been abolished with respect to car leasing and rental in all 50 states.

One example is in the case of a bank, finance company or other lienholder performing a repossession of an automobile from the registered owner for non-payment: the lienholder has a non-delegable duty not to cause a breach of the peace in performing the repossession, or it will be liable for damages even if the repossession is performed by an agent. This requirement means that whether a repossession is performed by the lienholder or by an agent, the repossessor must not cause a breach of the peace or the lienholder will be held responsible.

This requirement not to breach the peace is held upon the lienholder even if the breach is caused by, say, the debtor's objecting to the repossession or resisting the repossession. In the court case of MBank El Paso v. Sanchez, 836 S.W.2d 151, where a hired repossessor towed away a car even after the registered owner locked herself in it, the court decided that this was an unlawful breach of the peace and declared the repossession invalid. The debtor was also awarded $1,200,000 in damages from the bank. However, notably, a breach of the peace will invariably constitute a criminal misdemeanor. Criminal law imparts separate and distinct liability upon each actor considered a person under the law, and therefore a corporation and the corporation's employee may both be charged with having committed exactly the same crime, in addition to any civil liability for which the law imposes.

== Parental liability ==
In the United States, the question of parental responsibility generally follows the common law principle that a parent is not civilly liable for injuries resulting from a child's negligence merely because of the parent-child relationship.

When a child causes an injury, parents may be held liable for their own negligent acts, such as failure to properly supervise a child, or failure to keep a dangerous instrument such as a handgun outside the reach of their children. Many states have also enacted laws that impose some liability on parents for the intentional wrongful acts committed by their minor children.

== Liability of corporations in tort ==
In English law, a corporation can only act through its employees and agents so it is necessary to decide in which circumstances the law of agency or vicarious liability will apply to hold the corporation liable in tort for the frauds of its directors or senior officers. If liability for the particular tort requires a state of mind, then to be liable, the director or senior officer must have that state of mind and it must be attributed to the company.

In Meridian Global Funds Management Asia Ltd v Securities Commission [1995] 2 AC 500, two employees of the company, acting within the scope of their authority but unknown to the directors, used company funds to acquire some shares. The question was whether the company knew, or ought to have known that it had acquired those shares. The Privy Council held that it did. Whether by virtue of their actual or ostensible authority as agents acting within their authority (see Lloyd v Grace, Smith & Co. [1912] AC 716) or as employees acting in the course of their employment (see Armagas Limited v Mundogas S.A. [1986] 1 AC 717), their acts and omissions and their knowledge could be attributed to the company, and this could give rise to liability as joint tortfeasors where the directors have assumed responsibility on their own behalf and not just on behalf of the company.

So, if a director or officer is expressly authorised to represent a particular class on behalf of the company, and makes a fraudulent representation that causes loss to a Third Party, the company is liable, even though the representation was an improper way of doing what he was authorised to do. The extent of authority is a question fact and is significantly more than the fact of an employment that gave the employee the opportunity to carry out the fraud.

In Panorama Developments (Guildford) Ltd v Fidelis Furnishing Fabrics Ltd [1971] 2 QB 711, a company secretary fraudulently hired cars for his own use without the managing director knowing. A company secretary routinely enters into contracts in the company's name and has administrative responsibilities that would give apparent authority to hire cars. Hence, the company was liable.

== Employees' continued liability and indemnity ==
A common misconception involves the liability of the employee for tortious acts committed within the scope and authority of their employment. Although the employer is liable under respondeat superior for the employee's conduct, the employee, too, remains jointly liable for the harm caused. As the American Law Institute's Restatement of the Law of Agency, Third § 7.01 states,

An agent is subject to liability to a third party harmed by the agent's tortious conduct. Unless an applicable statute provides otherwise, an actor remains subject to liability although the actor acts as an agent or an employee, with actual or apparent authority, or within the scope of employment.

Every American state follows this same rule.

The question of indemnification arises when either solely the employee or solely the employer is sued. If only the employee is sued, then that employee may seek indemnification from the employer if the conduct was within the course and scope of their employment. If only the employer is sued, then the employer can attempt to avoid liability by claiming the employee's conduct was outside of the scope of the employee's authority, but the employer generally cannot sue the employee to recover indemnification for the employee's torts. For an example of a court confirming an employer's right to sue an employee for indemnification, see the case of Lister v Romford Ice and Cold Storage Co Ltd.

== Ecclesiastical corporations ==
In the 2003 decision Doe v. Bennett, the Supreme Court of Canada ruled that in cases of abuse scandals involving Catholic priests, liability derives from the power and authority over parishioners that the Church gave to its clergymen.

== See also ==
- Attribution (law)
- Superior orders
- Peculiar risk doctrine
- Vicarious liability in English law
