= Candler v Crane, Christmas & Co =

1951 English tort law case

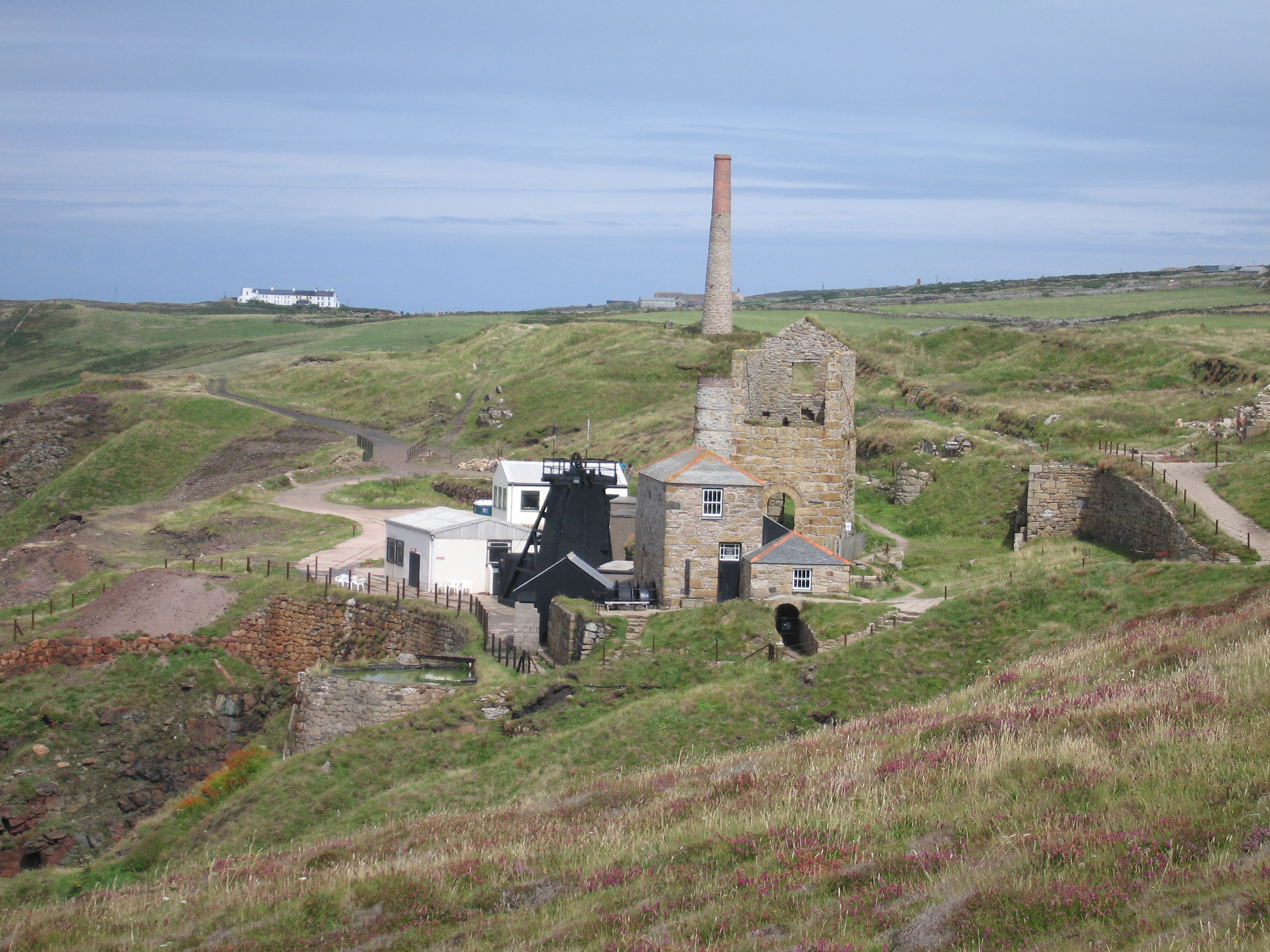
- Court: Court of Appeal
- Citation: [1951] 2 KB 164; [1951] 1 All ER 426; 36 Digest (Rep 1) 17; [1951] 1 TLR 371

Court membership
- Judges sitting: Lord Justice Cohen, Lord Justice Asquith and Lord Justice Denning

Case opinions
- Cohen LJ, Asquith LJ and Denning LJ

Keywords
- negligent misstatement, duty of care

Candler v Crane, Christmas & Co [1951] 2 KB 164 is an English tort law case on negligent misstatement.

In the case, Denning LJ delivered a dissenting judgment, arguing that a duty of care arose when making negligent statements. His dissenting judgment was later upheld by the House of Lords in Hedley Byrne v Heller 1963.

== Facts ==
Donald Ogilvie was the director of a company called Trevaunance Hydraulic Tin Mines Ltd, which mined tin in Cornwall. He needed more capital, so he placed an advertisement in The Times on 8 July 1946 which read,

"£10,000. Established Tin Mine (low capitalisation) in Cornwall seeks further capital. Install additional milling plant. Directorship and active participation open to suitable applicant - Apply"

Candler responded, saying he was interested in investing £2,000, provided he was shown the company's accounts. Ogilvie instructed Crane, Christmas & Co, a firm of auditors, to prepare the company's accounts and balance sheet. The draft accounts were shown to Candler in the presence of the auditor's clerk, a Mr Fraser. Candler relied on their accuracy and subscribed for £2,000 worth of shares in the company; but the company was actually in a very poor state. Ogilvie used the £2,000 on himself and then went bankrupt. Candler lost all the money he invested and brought an action against the accountants, Crane, Christmas & Co. for negligently misrepresenting the state of the company. As there was no contractual relationship between the parties, no case arose in misrepresentation, and so the action was brought in tort for pure economic loss.

== Judgment ==
The majority of the Court of Appeal (Cohen LJ and Asquith LJ) relied on the case of Derry v Peek to refuse a remedy to the plaintiff, holding that loss resulting from negligent misstatement was not actionable in the absence of any contractual or fiduciary relationship between the parties.

Denning LJ (as the future Master of the Rolls then was) delivered a dissenting judgment, in which he argued that any person in the reasonable contemplation of someone making a statement who might rely on that statement is owed a duty of care in tort. He was asked to read his decision first.

This case raises a point of law of much importance; because Mr. Lawson on behalf of the plaintiff submitted that, although there was no contract between the plaintiff and the accountants, nevertheless the relationship between them was so close and direct that the accountants did owe a duty of care to him within the principles stated in Donoghue v Stevenson; whereas Mr. Foster on behalf of the accountants submitted that the duty owed by the accountants was purely a contractual duty owed by them to the company, and therefore they were not liable for negligence to a person to whom they were under no contractual duty... The only defences raised by the accountants at the hearing of the appeal were:

(1) that Fraser was not acting in the course of his employment; and
(2) that, even if he were, they owed no duty of care to the plaintiff.

The judge appears to have treated it as beyond question that Fraser was acting in the course of his employment; and I agree with him. There is no doubt that Fraser was acting within his actual authority in writing up the books and preparing the accounts, and indeed his action in so doing was ratified and confirmed by the senior partner who signed the certificate; but it is said that Fraser had no authority to show the draft accounts to the plaintiff or to answer his queries, at any rate not without asking his principals for permission to do so. The senior partner admitted that it was a very common thing for accountants at the request of the chairman or person in control of a company to give details of the company's accounts to a prospective investor so as to induce him to invest money, but he said that it was for the principal of the firm to do it, and not for a clerk. That may well be so. It may not have been within Fraser's actual authority, but that is not the point. A master is often made responsible for the unauthorized or forbidden acts of his servant, when he has for his own purposes put the servant in a position where he can do the acts. Practical good sense demands that, even though the master is not at fault himself, he should be responsible if the servant conducts himself in a way which is injurious to others. He takes the benefits of the servant's rightful acts and should bear the burden of his wrongful ones; and he is, as a rule, the only one who has the means to pay. So here, I have no doubt that the accountants are responsible for the way in which Fraser conducted himself in preparing the accounts and showing them to the plaintiff who, after all, was perfectly innocent in the matter and had not the slightest idea that Fraser had no authority to do what he did.

Now I come to the great question in the case: did the accountants owe a duty of care to the plaintiff? If the matter were free from authority, I should have said that they clearly did owe a duty of care to him. They were professional accountants who prepared and put before him these accounts, knowing that he was going to be guided by them in making an investment in the company. On the faith of those accounts he did make the investment, whereas if the accounts had been carefully prepared, he would not have made the investment at all. The result is that he has lost his money. In the circumstances, had he not every right to rely on the accounts being prepared with proper care; and is he not entitled to redress from the accountants on whom he relied? I say that he is, and I would apply to this case the words of Knight Bruce, L.J., in an analogous case ninety years ago:

"A country whose administration of justice did not afford redress in a case of the present description would not be in a state of civilization": Slim v Croucher.

Turning now to authority, I can point to many general statements of principle which cover the case made by some of the great names in the law: Lord Eldon, LC, in Evans v Bicknell, Lord Campbell, LC, in Slim v Croucher, Lord Selborne, L.C., in Brownlee v Campbell, Lord Herschell in Derry v Peek, Lord Shaw in Nocton v Ashburton, and Lord Atkin in Donoghue v Stevenson. But it is said that effect cannot be given to these statements of principle, because there is an actual decision of this court in 1893 which is to the contrary, namely Le Lievre v Gould.

Before I consider the decision in Le Lievre v Gould itself, I wish to say that, in my opinion, at the time it was decided current legal thought was infected by two cardinal errors. The first error was one which appears time and time again in nineteenth century thought, namely, that no one who is not a party to a contract can sue on it or on anything arising out of it. This error has had unfortunate consequences both in the law of contract and in the law of tort. So far as contract is concerned, I have said something about it in Smith v River Douglas Catchment Board. So far as tort is concerned, it led the lawyers of that day to suppose that, if one of the parties to a contract was negligent in carrying it out, no third person who was injured by that negligence could sue for damages on account of it: see Winterbottom v Wright, Alton v Midland ry., and the notes to Pasley v Freeman; except in the case of things dangerous in themselves, like guns: see Dixon v Bell. This error lies at the root of the reasoning of Bowen, L.J., in Le Lievre v Gould, when he said that the law of England

"does not consider that what a man writes on paper is like a gun or other dangerous instrument",

meaning thereby that, unless it was a thing which was dangerous in itself, no action lay. This error was exploded by the great case of Donoghue v Stevenson, which decided that the presence of a contract did not defeat an action for negligence by a third person, provided that the circumstances disclosed a duty by the contracting party to him.

The second error was an error as to the effect of Derry v Peek, an error which persisted for thirty-five years at least after the decision, namely, that no action ever lies for a negligent statement even though it is intended to be acted on by the plaintiff and is in fact acted on by him to his loss. This error led the Court of Appeal in Low v Bouverie to deny the correctness of Slim v Croucher; and in Le Lievre v Gould to deny the correctness of Cann v Willson. The cases thus denied were so plainly just that the very denial of them was itself an error. The error was, however, exposed by the important case of Nocton v Ashburton, which decided that an action did lie for a negligent statement where the circumstances disclosed a duty to be careful; and that all that is to be deduced from (though not decided by) Derry v Peek is that in the particular circumstances of that case there was no duty to be careful. Lord Haldane observed significantly that the authorities subsequent to Derry v Peek had shown "a tendency to assume that it was intended to mean more than it did".

In my opinion these decisions of the House of Lords in Donoghue v Stevenson and Nocton v Ashburton are sufficient to entitle this court to examine afresh the law as to negligent statements, and that is what I propose to do.

Let me first be destructive and destroy the submissions put forward by Mr. Foster. His first submission was that a duty to be careful in making statements arose only out of a contractual duty to the plaintiff or a fiduciary relationship to him. Apart from such cases, no action, he said, had ever been allowed for negligent statements, and he urged that this want of authority was a reason against it being allowed now. This argument about the novelty of the action does not appeal to me in the least. It has been put forward in all the great cases which have been milestones of progress in our law, and it has always, or nearly always, been rejected. If you read the great cases of Ashby v White, Pasley v Freeman and Donoghue v Stevenson you will find that in each of them the judges were divided in opinion. On the one side there were the timorous souls who were fearful of allowing a new cause of action. On the other side there were the bold spirits who were ready to allow it if justice so required. It was fortunate for the common law that the progressive view prevailed. Whenever this argument of novelty is put forward I call to mind the emphatic answer given by Pratt, C.J., nearly two hundred years ago in Chapman v Pickersgill when he said:

"I wish never to hear this objection again. This action is for a tort: torts are infinitely various; not limited or confined, for there is nothing in nature but may be an instrument of mischief".

The same answer was given by Lord Macmillan in Donoghue v Stevenson when he said:

"The criterion of judgment must adjust and adapt itself to the changing circumstances of life. The categories of negligence are never closed".

I beg leave to quote those cases and those passages against those who would emphasize the paramount importance of certainty at the expense of justice. It needs only a little imagination to see how much the common law would have suffered if those decisions had gone the other way.

The second submission of Mr. Foster was that a duty to take care only arose where the result of a failure to take care will cause physical damage to persons or property. It was for this reason that he did not dispute two illustrations of negligent statements which I put in the course of the argument, the case of an analyst who negligently certifies to a manufacturer of food that a particular ingredient is harmless, whereas it is in fact poisonous, or the case of an inspector of lifts who negligently reports that a particular lift is safe, whereas it is in fact dangerous. The analyst and the lift inspector would, I should have thought, be liable to any person who was injured by consuming the food, or using the lift, at any rate if there was no likelihood of intermediate inspection: see Donoghue v Stevenson; Haseldine v CA Daw & Son LD. Mr. Foster said that that might well be so because the negligence there caused physical damage, but that the same would not apply to negligence which caused financial loss. He referred to some observations of Wrottesley, J., which were in his favour on this point: sec Old Gate Estates LD v Toplis. I must say, however, that I cannot accept this as a valid distinction. I can understand that in some cases of financial loss there may not be a sufficiently proximate relationship to give rise to a duty of care; but, if once the duty exists, I cannot think that liability depends on the nature of the damage.

The third submission of Mr. Foster was that the duty owed by the accountants was purely a contractual duty and therefore they were not liable for negligence to a person to whom they were under no contractual obligation. This seems to me to be simply a repetition of the nineteenth century fallacy which was stated in Alton v Midland Rly and exploded by Donoghue v Stevenson.

Let me now be constructive and suggest the circumstances in which I say that a duty to use care in statement does exist apart from a contract in that behalf. First, what persons are under such duty? My answer is those persons such as accountants, surveyors, valuers and analysts, whose profession and occupation it is to examine books, accounts, and other things, and to make reports on which other people - other than their clients - rely in the ordinary course of business. Their duty is not merely a duty to use care in their reports. They have also a duty to use care in their work which results in their reports. Herein lies the difference between these professional men and other persons who have been held to be under no duty to use care in their statements, such as promoters who issue a prospectus: Derry v Peek (now altered by statute), and trustees who answer inquiries about the trust funds: Low v Bouverie. Those persons do not bring, and are not expected to bring, any professional knowledge or skill into the preparation of their statements: they can only be made responsible by the law affecting persons generally, such as contract, estoppel, innocent misrepresentation or fraud. But it is very different with persons who engage in a calling which requires special knowledge and skill. From very early times it has been held that they owe a duty of care to those who are closely and directly affected by their work, apart altogether from any contract or undertaking in that behalf. Thus Fitzherbert, in his new Natura Brevium (1534) 94D, says that:

"If a smith prick my horse with a nail, I shall have my action on the case against him, without any warranty by the smith to do it well"; and he supports it with an excellent reason: "for it is the duty of every artificer to exercise his art rightly and truly as he ought".

This reasoning has been treated as applicable not only to shoeing smiths, surgeons and barbers, who work with hammers, knives and scissors, but also to shipbrokers and clerks in the Custom House who work with figures and make entries in books, "because their situation and employment necessarily imply a competent degree of knowledge in making such entries": see Shiels v Blackburne, per Lord Loughborough, which was not referred to by Devlin J, in Heskell v Continental Express LD.

The same reasoning has been applied to medical men who make reports on the sanity of others: see Everett v Griffiths. It is, I think, also applicable to professional accountants. They are not liable, of course, for casual remarks made in the course of conversation, nor for other statements made outside their work, or not made in their capacity as accountants: compare Fish v Kelly; but they are, in my opinion, in proper cases, apart from any contract in the matter, under a duty to use reasonable care in the preparation of their accounts and in the making of their reports.

Secondly, to whom do these professional people owe this duty? I will take accountants, but the same reasoning applies to the others. They owe the duty, of course, to their employer or client; and also I think to any third person to whom they themselves show the accounts, or to whom they know their employer is going to show the accounts, so as to induce him to invest money or take some other action on them. But I do not think the duty can be extended still further so as to include strangers of whom they have heard nothing and to whom their employer without their knowledge may choose to show their accounts. Once the accountants have handed their accounts to their employer they are not, as a rule, responsible for what he does with them without their knowledge or consent.

A good illustration is afforded by the decision in Le Lievre v Gould itself, which I certainly would not wish to call in question. The facts are somewhat differently stated in the various reports, but collecting them together they come to this: A surveyor there surveyed work for a building owner and handed certificates to him so that he could know the amounts which he had to pay the builder. The building owner then chose to show the certificates to his own mortgagees who advanced money on them instead of on the certificates of their own surveyor. The mortgagees then said that the owner's surveyor owed a duty of care to them. That was obviously untenable, because they should have had the work surveyed by their own surveyor. Indeed they had actually stipulated for it. The relationship was therefore one in which the inspection of an intermediate person might reasonably be interposed, and was consequently too remote to raise a duty of care: see per Lord Atkin in Donoghue v Stevenson. But excluding such cases as those, there are some cases - of which the present is one - where the accountants know all the time, even before they present their accounts, that their employer requires the accounts to show to a third person so as to induce him to act on them: and then they themselves, or their employers, present the accounts to him for the purpose. In such cases I am of opinion that the accountants owe a duty of care to the third person.

The test of proximity in these cases is: did the accountants know that the accounts were required for submission to the plaintiff and use by him? That appears from the case of Langridge v Levy as extended by Cleasby B in George v Skivington; and from the decision of that good judge, Chitty J, in Cann v Willson, which is directly in point. In that case a valuer made a valuation of property for the very purpose of enabling his client to raise a mortgage on it; and, in order to further the transaction, the valuer himself actually put the valuation before the mortgagee's solicitor saying that it was a very moderate valuation and not made in favour of the borrower. The mortgagee advanced money on the faith of the valuation, but it turned out that the valuer had been grossly careless, and the mortgagee lost his money. Chitty, J., held that the valuer was liable in negligence, apart from any contract at all. He said that the valuation was sent by the valuers direct to the mortgagee's solicitor

"for the purpose of inducing the plaintiff and his co-trustee to lay out the trust money on mortgage. It seems to me that the defendants knowingly placed themselves in that position, and in point of law incurred a duty towards him to use reasonable care in the preparation of the document called a valuation. I think it is like the case of the supply of an article - the supply of the hairwash in the case of George v Skivington".

That reasoning seems to me to be good sense and good law. I know that in Le Lievre v Gould the Court of Appeal said that Cann v Willson was wrongly decided; but it must be remembered that at that time the general opinion of the profession was that the case of George v Skivington, on which Chitty J, relied, was itself wrongly decided, or at any rate that the principle stated in it by Cleasby, B., was wrong: see per Field and Cave, JJ., and Bowen and Cotton, LJJ, in Heaven v Pender, and per Hamilton, J., in Blacker v Lake and Elliott. If George v Skivington was wrong, then, of course, Cann v Willson 115 was wrong, for it was based on it. But in Donoghue v Stevenson the House of Lords fully restored George v Skivington, and Lord Atkin himself approved the reasoning of Cleasby, B. 118 . It seems to me that by so doing the House of Lords have implicitly restored Cann v Willson, because they have restored the case on which it was based; and if Cann v Willson is good law it follows that in the present case the accountants owed a duty of care to the plaintiff, for the circumstances are indistinguishable.

Thirdly, to what transactions does the duty of care extend? It extends, I think, only to those transactions for which the accountants knew their accounts were required. For instance, in the present case it extends to the original investment of 2,000l. which the plaintiff made in reliance on the accounts, because the accountants knew that the accounts were required for his guidance in making that investment; but it does not extend to the subsequent 200l. which he made after he had been two months with the company. This distinction, that the duty only extends to the very transaction in mind at the time, is implicit in the decided cases. Thus a doctor, who negligently certifies a man to be a lunatic when he is not, is liable to him, although there is no contract in the matter, because the doctor knows that his certificate is required for the very purpose of deciding whether the man should be detained or not; but an insurance company's doctor owes no duty to the insured person, because he makes his examination only for the purposes of the insurance company: see Everett v Griffiths, where Atkin LJ, proceeds on the self-same principles as he expounded fully later in Donoghue v Stevenson. So, also, a Lloyd's surveyor who, in surveying for classification purposes, negligently passes a mast as sound when it is not, is not liable to the owner for damage caused by it breaking, because the surveyor makes his survey only for the purpose of classifying the ship for the Yacht Register and not otherwise: Humphery v Bowers. Again, a scientist or expert (including a marine hydrographer) is not liable to his readers for careless statements in his published works. He publishes his work simply for the purpose of giving information, and not with any particular transaction in mind at all. But when a scientist or an expert makes an investigation and report for the very purpose of a particular transaction, then, in my opinion, he is under a duty of care in respect of that transaction.

It will be noticed that I have confined the duty to cases where the accountant prepares his accounts and makes his report for the guidance of the very person in the very transaction in question. That is sufficient for the decision of this case. I can well understand that it would be going too far to make an accountant liable to any person in the land who chooses to rely on the accounts in matters of business, for that would expose him to "liability in an indeterminate amount for an indeterminate time to an indeterminate class": see Ultramares Corporation v Touche per Cardozo CJ. Whether he would be liable if he prepared his accounts for the guidance of a specific class of persons in specific class of transactions, I do not say. I should have thought he might be, just as the analyst and lift inspector would be liable in the instances I have given earlier. It is perhaps worth mentioning that Parliament has intervened to make the professional man liable for negligent reports given for the purposes of a prospectus: see ss. 40 and 43 of the Companies Act 1948. That is an instance of liability for reports made for the guidance of a specific class of persons - investors, in a specific class of transactions - applying for shares. That enactment does not help, one way or the other, to show what result the common law would have reached in the absence of such provisions; but it does show what result it ought to reach.

My conclusion is that a duty to use care in statement is recognized by English law, and that its recognition does not create any dangerous precedent when it is remembered that it is limited in respect of the persons by whom and to whom it is owed and the transactions to which it applies.

One final word: I think that the law would fail to serve the best interests of the community if it should hold that accountants and auditors owe a duty to no one but their client. Its influence would be most marked in cases where their client is a company or firm controlled by one man. It would encourage accountants to accept the information which the one man gives them, without verifying it; and to prepare and present the accounts rather as a lawyer prepares and presents a case, putting the best appearance on the accounts they can, without expressing their personal opinion of them. This is, to my way of thinking, an entirely wrong approach. There is a great difference between the lawyer and the accountant. The lawyer is never called on to express his personal belief in the truth of his client's case; whereas the accountant, who certifies the accounts of his client, is always called on to express his personal opinion as to whether the accounts exhibit a true and correct view of his client's affairs; and he is required to do this, not so much for the satisfaction of his own client, but more for the guidance of shareholders, investors, revenue authorities, and others who may have to rely on the accounts in serious matters of business. If we should decide this case in favour of the accountants there will be no reason why accountants should ever verify the word of the one man in a one-man company, because there will be no one to complain about it. The one man who gives them wrong information will not complain if they do not verify it. He wants their backing for the misleading information he gives them, and he can only get it if they accept his word without verification. It is just what he wants so as to gain his own ends. and the persons who are misled cannot complain because the accountants owe no duty to them. If such be the law, I think it is to be regretted, for it means that the accountants' certificate, which should be a safeguard, becomes a snare for those who rely on it. I do not myself think that it is the law. In my opinion accountants owe a duty of care not only to their own clients, but also to all those whom they know will rely on their accounts in the transactions for which those accounts are prepared.

I would therefore be in favour of allowing the appeal and entering judgment for the plaintiff for damages in the sum of 2,000l.

== See also ==
- Cann v Willson (1888) 39 Ch.D 39, a valuer instructed by a mortgagor sent his report to the mortgagee who made an advance in reliance on the valuation. The valuer was held liable in the tort of negligence to the mortgagee for failing to carry out the valuation with reasonable care and skill.
- Hedley Byrne & Co Ltd v Heller & Partners Ltd [1964] AC 465
- Ministry of Housing and Local Government v Sharp [1970] 2 QB 223, the local authority was held liable to the Ministry because of the failure of an employee of the authority to exercise reasonable skill and care in searching for entries in the local land charges register. The search certificate prepared by the clerk negligently failed to record a charge of £1,828 11s. 5d. in favour of the Ministry. Lord Denning MR, 268, rejected that a duty of care only arose when there was a voluntary assumption of responsibility, rather "from the fact that the person making it knows, or ought to know, that others, being his neighbours in this regard, would act on the faith of the statement being accurate."
- Smith v Eric S. Bush
- Caparo Industries plc v Dickman
- White v Jones
- Her Majesty's Commissioners of Customs and Excise v Barclays Bank Plc
