= Walsh v Jones Lang Lasalle Ltd =

Irish Supreme Court case

- Coat of arms of Ireland
- Court: Supreme Court of Ireland
- Full case name: David Walsh v Jones Lang Lasalle Ltd
- Decided: 1 June 2017
- Citation: [2017] IESC 38

Case history
- Appealed from: High Court
- Appealed to: Supreme Court

Court membership
- Judges sitting: O'Donnell J., McKechnie J., MacMenamin J., Laffoy J., O'Malley J.

Case opinions
- The Supreme Court clarified the law in Ireland in relation to the effect of statements disclaiming liability in actions claiming negligent misstatement
- Decision by: O’Donnell J, Laffoy J
- Concurrence: O'Malley J.
- Dissent: McKechnie J, MacMenamin J.

Keywords
- Negligent Acts | Negligent Misstatement | Negligence

Walsh v Jones Lang Lasalle Ltd [2017] IESC 38, is a decision of the Irish Supreme Court in which the court held that a purchaser bears the risk of reliance on erroneous information unless the vendor has clearly assumed responsibility for its accuracy. In reaching this decision, the court clarified the law in Ireland "in relation to the effect of statements disclaiming liability in actions claiming negligent misstatement."

== Background ==
David Walsh (the plaintiff in the original trial and the respondent in the Supreme Court appeal) was in search of a premises for his business management training. He got a call from an agent and was told a premises was for sale. Mr Walsh went to the premises with his agent and also the training manager. He returned to the premises a few months later and met Mr O'Neill who worked for Jones Lang Lasalle Ltd (the defendant in the original trial and the appellant in the Supreme Court appeal) . Mr O'Neill gave Mr Walsh a two-page brochure that contained his details and a photograph of the premises. The brochure also included the following disclaimer at the bottom of the first page in “very small print”:

Whilst every care has been taken in the preparation of these particulars, and they are believed to be correct, they are not warranted and intending purchasers/lessees should satisfy themselves as to the correctness of the information given.

Mr Walsh did not conduct his own measurement of the building. He calculated his purchase bid on the basis of the anticipated commercial rent per square footage, as stated in the brochure. The measurement of the premises in the brochure was incorrect. Mr Walsh sued Jones Lang Lasalle Ltd for negligence and negligent misstatement, on the basis that Jones Lang Lasalle Ltd failed "to take reasonable care in relation to the preparation and contents of the brochure". The legal issue raised was whether the small disclaimer was sufficient to relieve Jones lang Lasalle Ltd of liability for negligent misstatement.

=== The High Court ===
In the High Court, the judge (Quirke J.) held that the relationship between the Mr Walsh and Jones Lang Lasalle Ltd was "sufficiently proximate to give rise to a 'special relationship'". The Court further held that the presence of the disclaimer in the brochure and its "precise terms" were insufficient to exclude Jones Lang Lasalle Ltd from liability. If Jones Lang Lasalle Ltd wanted to be able to publish grossly inaccurate measurements, then it should have drawn to the attention of readers the fact that the "seemingly precise measurements published were likely to be wholly unreliable and should not be relied upon in any circumstances". The trial judge held that it was appropriate to measure the damages by calculating the amount that Mr Walsh had overpaid. The High Court therefore ruled in favour of Mr Walsh and awarded him damages of €350,000.

Jones Lang Lasalle Ltd appealed. There was no appeal in regards to the damages, rather the question in regard to liability.

== Holding of the Supreme Court ==
Written judgments were provided by O'Donnell J, Laffoy J, MacMenamin J. The majority - O'Donnell J, Laffoy J (O'Malley J concurring) - found in favour of Jones Lang Lasalle Ltd (as the appellant) and allowed the appeal. MacMenamin J (McKechnie J concurring) delivered the dissenting judgment.

=== Majority judgments ===
The majority judges concluded that the disclaimer clause in the brochure made it clear that the appellant was not assuming responsibility for the accuracy of the statement as to the dimensions of the property. The court referred to the case of Hedley Byrne & Co. v. Heller & Partners Ltd where it was established that "the author of a statement could, in certain circumstances, be liable for financial loss caused by it to a person relying on it". This case confirmed that liability in negligence could extend "beyond negligent acts causing physical damage and consequential loss covered by the principle in Donoghue v. Stevenson [1932] AC 562". However, in Hedley Byrne the House of Lords made it clear that "different principles applied in the case of damages claimed as a result of statements made rather than acts done or omitted to be done".

Laffoy J and O'Donnell J (for the majority) also referred to the English case of McCullagh v Lane Fox and Partners as relevant. In McCullagh, an estate agent had represented (both orally and in written particulars of the property) the price of the site. After purchasing the property, the plaintiff discovered that the plot site was only approximately half this size and sued the estate agent in negligence. The estate agents relied upon a disclaimer in their particulars document. Laffoy J cited with approval Hobhouse L.J.'s judgment in which it was noted that “[t]he relevance of the disclaimer is to negative one of the essential elements for the existence of the duty of care and negatives the assumption of responsibility for the statement”. Laffoy J also went on to note that the “right approach as is made clear in Hedley Byrne, is to treat the existence of the disclaimer as one of the facts relevant to answering the question whether there had been an assumption of responsibility by the defendants for the relevant statement”.

Laffoy J. therefore determined that the High Court had failed to adequately consider the significance of the disclaimer where the appellant made it clear that details in the brochure were not warranted. O'Donnell J. concluded that the High Court had erred in "running together the analysis of a claim for a negligent act (incorrect measurement of the floor area of the property) and a claim for negligent misstatement (contained in the particulars of the property in the brochure) leading to the assumption that there existed a duty of care and, only then, looking to the disclaimer to consider whether it was sufficient to exclude that presumed duty of care." O'Donnell J. held that the approach of the High Court was more appropriate to the consideration of an exemption clause that seeks to limit a contractual liability that was already extant. The context of negligent misstatement is different from the principles in Hedley Byrne.

O'Donnell J, Laffoy J (O'Malley J concurring) therefore concluded that there had been no assumption of responsibility on the part of the appellant in relation to the task of "furnishing accurate internal measurements and, consequently, no duty of care arose". As the court noted "an effective disclaimer of responsibility prevents the “proximity” ingredient of the existence of a duty of care being established." Where the person "giving the information in so doing has expressly included a disclaimer in the brochure or advertisement, ... the core issue in determining whether a duty of care exists is whether the existence of the disclaimer by reference to its terms has the effect that there is no assumption of responsibility for the task of furnishing correct information on the part of the estate agent giving the information to the recipient." In the present case, the disclaimer, when read objectively and as a whole was "clear and unambiguous as to non-assumption by [the appellants] of responsibility for the correctness of the particulars."

=== Minority / dissenting judgments ===
MacMenamin J and McKechnie J concluded that the appellant did owe the respondent a duty of care and that the appeal should be dismissed.

MacMenamin J. focused on the substance of the disclaimer. He noted that if the disclaimer in the brochure had been clear and appropriate, then it would have been "sufficient to exonerate the firm from liability." However, he distinguished McCullagh, as the terms of the disclaimer in McCullagh “were crystal clear”, something that could not be said for the disclaimer in the appellant's brochure. MacMenamin J. therefore concluded that the trial judge was correct in finding that the disclaimer "carried with it a representation from a firm of the highest integrity that every care had been taken in preparing the brochure". The judge went on to note that the trial judge had "concluded on cogent evidence that the information given was for a specific purpose, actually made known to the purchaser, in circumstances where the firm should have known that the information would be relied on, and acted upon" - "on the facts that the remainder of the disclaimer had no legal efficacy."

=== Conclusion ===
On the basis of the majority decision, the appeal was allowed.
