= Tort of deceit =

Legal injury

The tort of deceit is a type of legal injury that occurs when a person intentionally and knowingly deceives another person into an action that damages them. Specifically, deceit requires that the tortfeasor

- makes a factual representation,
- knowing that it is false, or reckless or is indifferent about its veracity,
- intending that another person relies on it,
- who then acts in reliance on it, to that person's own detriment.

Deceit dates in its modern development from Pasley v. Freeman. Here the defendant said that a third party was creditworthy to the claimant, knowing he was broke. The claimant loaned the third party money and lost it. He sued the defendant successfully.

== Relationship with negligence ==
The leading case in English law is Derry v. Peek, which was decided before the development of the law on negligent misstatement. In Hedley Byrne & Co Ltd v. Heller & Partners Ltd it was decided that people who make statements which they ought to have known were untrue because they were negligent, can in some circumstances, to restricted groups of claimants be liable to make compensation for any loss flowing from them, despite the decision in Derry v Peek. This falls under the so-called "voluntary assumption of responsibility" test.

In Bradford Equitable B S. v Borders, it was held that, in addition, the maker of the statement must have intended that the claimant would rely upon the statement.

Negligence and deceit differ with respect to remoteness of damages. In deceit the defendant is liable for all losses flowing directly from the tort, whether they were foreseeable or not. In Doyle v. Olby (Ironmongers) Ltd, Lord Denning MR remarked, "it does not lie in the mouth of the fraudulent person to say that [such damages directly flowing from the fraudulent inducement] could not reasonably have been foreseen". So where there is a sudden downturn in the property market, a person guilty of deceitful misrepresentation is liable for all the claimant's losses, even if they have been increased by such an unanticipated event. This is subject to a duty to mitigate the potential losses.

Contributory negligence is no defence in an action for deceit. However proving deceit is far more difficult than proving negligence, because of the requirement for intention.

== See also ==
- Tort law
- Misrepresentation
- Misleading or deceptive conduct
