= Smith v Eric S Bush =

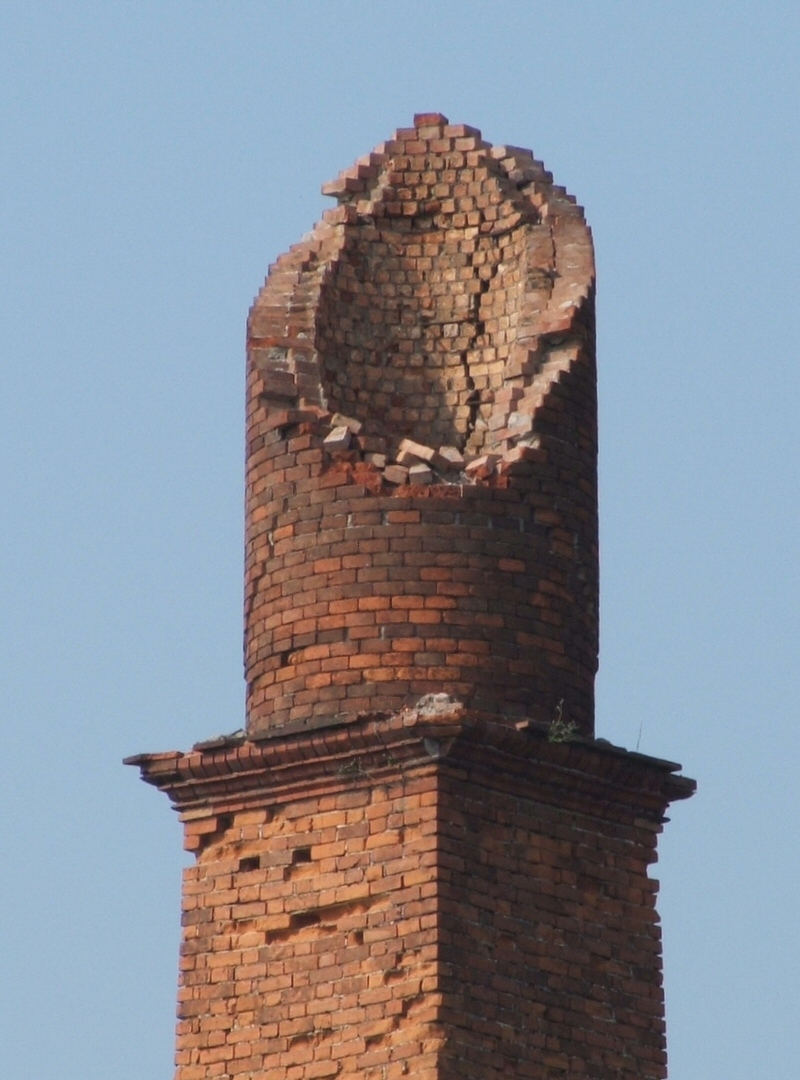
- Court: House of Lords
- Decided: 20 April 1989
- Citations: [1990] UKHL 1, [1989] 2 WLR 790; [1990] 1 AC 831

Case history
- Prior actions: Smith [1988] QB 743 and Harris [1988] QB 835

Court membership
- Judges sitting: Lord Keith of Kinkel, Lord Brandon of Oakbrook, Lord Templeman, Lord Griffiths and Lord Jauncey of Tullichettle

Case opinions
- Lord Templeman, Lord Griffiths and Lord Jauncey

Smith v Eric S Bush [1990] UKHL 1 is an English tort law and contract law case, heard by the House of Lords. First, it concerned the existence of a duty of care in tort for negligent misstatements, not made directly to someone relying on the statement. Second, it concerned the reasonableness of a term excluding liability under the Unfair Contract Terms Act 1977, s 2(2) and s 11.

== Facts ==
A surveyor, Eric Bush, was employed by a building society, Abbey National, to inspect and value 242 Silver Road, Norwich. Eric Bush disclaimed responsibility to the purchaser, Mrs Smith, who was paying a fee of £36.89 to the building society to have the valuation done. The building society had a similar clause in its mortgage agreement. The property valuation said no essential repairs were needed. This was wrong. But Mrs Smith relied on this and bought the house. Bricks from the chimney collapsed through the roof, smashing through the loft. Mrs Smith argued there was a duty of care in tort to exercise care in making statements and then that the clause excluding liability for loss or damage to property was unreasonable under 2(2) and 13(1) of UCTA 1977. The property was valued at £16,500 and bought for £18,000.

The case was joined with another appeal, Harris v Wyre Forest District Council. In this one, it was the Council that was the mortgagee. It also did the valuation. It also had a disclaimer, which was challenged by the home buyer.

For Mr and Mrs Harris Anthony Colman QC (now Colman J), Malcolm Stitcher and David Platt appeared, and for Wyre Forest District Council and Mr Lee appeared Piers Ashworth QC and Nicholas J Worsley. Mrs Smith was represented by Robert Seabrook Q.C. and Philip Havers, while Eric S. Bush was represented by Nigel Hague QC and Jane Davies.

== Judgment ==
It was held that it was not unreasonable for the purchaser of a modest house to rely on the surveyors' evaluation, as it was such common practice. In this way the court extended Hedley Byrne liability to proximate third parties.

Under UCTA 1977 an initial issue was the scope of the Act's coverage under s 13. Lord Templeman said the Act regulated ‘all exclusion notices which would in common law provide a defence to an action for negligence.’ Lord Griffiths said s.13 was ‘introducing a ‘but for’ test in relation to the notice excluding liability’, so courts should decide whether a duty of care would exist but for the exclusion. Lord Jauncey said the wording of s 13 was ‘entirely appropriate to cover a disclaimer which prevents a duty coming into existence.’

The Lords decided that even though the defendants had issued a liability waiver, this could not stand up to the test of reasonableness under s.11. That was because the purchase of a house by a private citizen like Mrs Smith was bound to be one of the most expensive in a lifetime, and it was more reasonable that a professional surveyor bear the risk of liability. The Lords did however say that not all exclusion clauses used by surveyors would be unreasonable, for instance in big property developments.

== See also ==
- Cann v Willson (1888) 39 ChD 39, a valuer instructed by a mortgagor sent his report to the mortgagee who made an advance in reliance on the valuation. The valuer was held liable in the tort of negligence to the mortgagee for failing to carry out the valuation with reasonable care and skill.
- Candler v Crane, Christmas & Co [1951] 2 KB 164
- Hedley Byrne & Co Ltd v Heller & Partners Ltd [1964] AC 465
- Ministry of Housing and Local Government v Sharp [1970] 2 QB 223, the local authority was held liable to the Ministry because of the failure of an employee of the authority to exercise reasonable skill and care in searching for entries in the local land charges register. The search certificate prepared by the clerk negligently failed to record a charge of £1,828 11s. 5d. in favour of the Ministry. Lord Denning MR, 268, rejected that a duty of care only arose when there was a voluntary assumption of responsibility, rather "from the fact that the person making it knows, or ought to know, that others, being his neighbours in this regard, would act on the faith of the statement being accurate."
- Caparo Industries plc v Dickman
- White v Jones
- Her Majesty's Commissioners of Customs and Excise v Barclays Bank Plc
