= Nocton v Lord Ashburton =

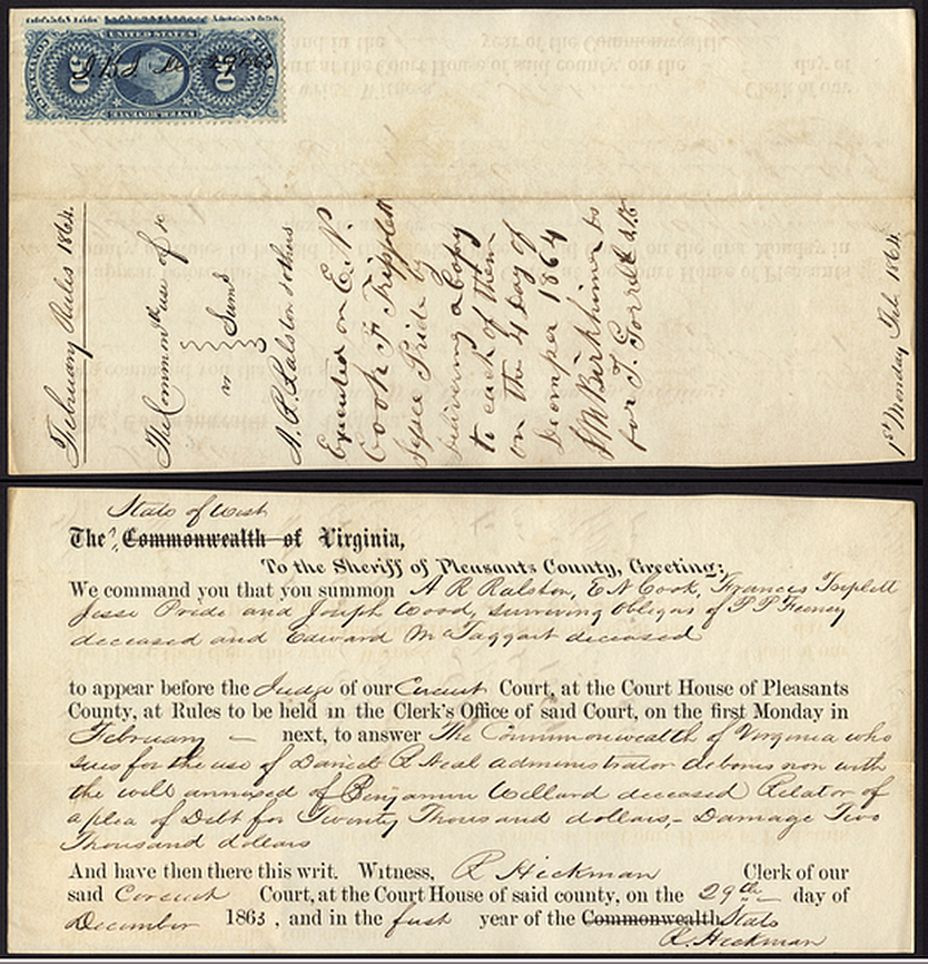
- Court: House of Lords
- Decided: 19 June 1914
- Citation: [1914] AC 932

Keywords
- Professional negligence, assumption of responsibility

Nocton v Lord Ashburton [1914] AC 932 is a leading English tort law case concerning professional negligence and the conditions under which a person will be taken to have assumed responsibility for the welfare of another. It confirmed it extended to unequivocal professional advice.

== Facts ==
Lord Ashburton bought a property for £60,000 on Church Street, Kensington, London. His solicitor was Nocton who advised him to seek the release (lease or sell) part of the house (which was also security for a mortgage). This was a bad idea, because as Nocton in fact knew, this meant that the security would become insufficient. Lord Ashburton alleged the advice was not given in good faith, but rather in Mr Nocton's self-interest.

== Judgment ==
Viscount Haldane LC for whole judicial committee held that despite Derry v Peek (which had disallowed any claim for misstatements apart from in the tort of deceit), Nocton was liable for his bad advice given the fiduciary relationship between the solicitor and client.

== See also ==
- Hedley Byrne & Co Ltd v Heller & Partners Ltd known as the Hedley Byrne principles of or test for professional negligent misstatements.
