= Commissioners of Customs and Excise v Barclays Bank plc =

2006 English tort law case

Customs and Excise v Barclays Bank Plc
- Court: House of Lords
- Decided: 21 June 2006
- Citation: [2006] UKHL 28

Case history
- Prior actions: [2004] EWCA Civ 1555, [2004] EWHC 122 (Comm)

Court membership
- Judges sitting: Lord Bingham of Cornhill, Lord Hoffmann, Lord Rodger of Earlsferry, Lord Walker of Gestingthorpe, Lord Mance

Keywords
- Assumption of responsibility, Caparo test, negligent misstatement

Her Majesty's Commissioners of Customs and Excise v Barclays Bank Plc [2006] UKHL 28 is a leading English tort law case concerning negligent misstatement and pure economic loss.

== Facts ==
The Customs and Excise needed to freeze the bank account of two Barclays customers, Brightstar Systems Ltd and Doveblue Ltd, as they both owed the Customs and Excise large sums of unpaid value added tax. By law, banks are required to comply with requests for freezing orders and are paid for the service. When the bank received the request, the bank replied that it would abide. But due to "operator error", the account was not frozen and the customer proceeded to empty all of the money from the account. Customs and Excise sued Barclays for the amount that was lost along with the interest. Barclays argued it had no duty of care, nor had it assumed responsibility.

== Judgment ==
=== Court of Appeal ===
Peter Gibson LJ, Longmore LJ, Lindsay LJ held that there was no duty and proposed that Hedley Byrne type assumption of responsibility should be subsumed into the threefold test from Caparo Industries plc v Dickman.

=== House of Lords ===
The House of Lords unanimously disapproved the Court of Appeal's decision, that "assumption of responsibility" was indistinct and subsumed into the law of negligence. It held, however, that in this case, because the bank was required by law to comply with the freezing order, there could not be said to have arisen any assumption of responsibility on Hedley Byrne grounds. Applying then the Caparo test, it was held to not be fair, just and reasonable to impose liability. The bank was therefore not required to reimburse Customs and Excise for the dissipated money.

== See also ==
- Negligence
