= Cann v Willson =

English tort law case

- Citation: 39 Ch D 39

Cann v Willson (1888) 39 Ch D 39, is an English tort law case, concerning negligent valuation.

== Facts ==
A valuer instructed by a mortgagor sent his report to the mortgagee who made an advance in reliance on the valuation.

== Judgment ==
The valuer was held liable in the tort of negligence to the mortgagee for failing to carry out the valuation with reasonable care and skill.

== Significance ==
The decision in Cann v Willson was retreated from in subsequent cases including Derry v Peek, Le Lievre v Gould, and Candler v Crane, Christmas & Co, but the principle that a third party could have a tort claim for negligent misstatement was brought back with the decision in Hedley Byrne & Co Ltd v Heller & Partners Ltd.

== See also ==
- Smith v Eric S Bush
