= Tabula in naufragio =

Legal term

Tabula in naufragio is a legal Latin phrase, literally interpreted as "a plank in a shipwreck". It is used metaphorically, particularly in law, to convey: "when all else has failed, it is the thing that stops (or is intended to stop) you from drowning." It is most commonly used to designate the power subsisting in a third (or subsequent) mortgagee, who took the third mortgage without notice of the second mortgage, and then acquired the first mortgage and attached it to the third mortgage, thereby obtaining priority over the second mortgagee. Without the legal ability to attach ("tack") to the first mortgage, the third mortgage would be worthless.

The phrase was first attributed to Sir Matthew Hale, although he died more than 200 years before the advent of the modern English doctrine of tacking arising from Hopkinson v Rolt. According to Black's Law Dictionary: "It may be fairly said that the doctrine survives only in the unjust and much criticised English rule of tacking."

The phrase is also used, often dismissively or wryly, to describe a proposition in legal submissions which the proponent hopes can (just about) stay afloat even though the rest of that party's case has been holed below the waterline. An example of this latter usage appears in the minority judgement of Lord Buckmaster in Donoghue v Stevenson, a case that established the modern concept of negligence in 1932. He wrote, "this passage has been used as a tabula in naufragio for many litigants struggling in the seas of adverse authority." Similarly, Lord Diplock used the phrase in Berger & Co Inc v Gill & Duffus SA:

It has for more than half a century justifiably remained one of those submerged cases which lawyers in general have tacitly accepted as being a total loss, until it was dredged up in the course of the hearing of the instant case in your Lordships' House to provide, in the judgments of Knox CJ and Higgins J, a tabula in naufragio for the buyers.
