= Misleading or deceptive conduct =

Australian legal doctrine

Misleading or deceptive conduct (often referred to as just misleading conduct) is a doctrine of Australian law.

Section 18 of the Australian Consumer Law, which is found in schedule 2 of the Competition and Consumer Act 2010, prohibits conduct by corporations in trade or commerce which is misleading or deceptive or is likely to mislead or deceive. The states and territories of Australia each have Fair Trading Legislation either containing similar provisions in relation to misleading or deceptive conduct by individuals, or simply applies the federal law to the state or territory. Section 12DA of the Australian Securities and Investment Commission Act 2001 prohibits misleading or deceptive conduct in financial services.

The doctrine aims primarily to provide consumer protection by preventing businesses from misleading their customers. However, it extends to all situations in the course of trade or commerce. A range of remedies are available in the event of misleading or deceptive conduct.

== Application ==
The prohibition on misleading conduct is set out in section 18(1) of the Australian Consumer Law:

"A person must not, in trade or commerce, engage in conduct that is misleading or deceptive or is likely to mislead or deceive."

The Australian Consumer Law defines conduct as:

"...doing or refusing to do any act, including the making of, or the giving effect to a provision of, a contract or arrangement, the arriving at, or the giving effect to a provision of, and understanding or the requiring of the giving of, or the giving of, a covenant;"

Section 18 of the Australian Consumer Law essentially mirrors the previous ban on misleading or deceptive conduct in section 52 of the Trade Practices Act.

The elements required to establish misleading or deceptive conduct are:

1. the impugned conduct was done in trade or commerce;
2. the impugned conduct was, in all the circumstances, misleading or deceptive;
3. the claimant relied on the conduct; and
4. as a result of its reliance on the conduct, the claimant suffered a loss.

=== Trade or commerce ===
"Trade or commerce" is given its ordinary construction, and applies not only to transactions between corporations and consumers, but to anyone providing or acquiring goods or services. However, purely private or domestic transactions will not be captured within the ambit of section 18.

=== Misleading or deceptive ===
Unlike related doctrines in contract or tort law, such as the tort of deceit and misrepresentation, misleading or deceptive conduct applies to any conduct that is, or is likely to be, misleading or deceptive, and does not require the making of a representation.

Conduct is likely to mislead or deceive where there is a "real and not remote" chance that it will mislead or deceive, which can be true even where the probability of misleading or deceiving is less than 50%. When the allegedly misleading or deceptive conduct is directed towards the public at large, the relevant reaction is that of the ordinary or reasonable members of the class of prospective purchasers. If the conduct is directed at specific individuals, the conduct as a whole is relevant, considering the nature of the parties and transaction.

=== Reliance and intent ===
Misleading or deceptive conduct is a "strict liability" offence, in that it does not matter whether the conduct was intended to mislead or deceive, or even whether the claimant could reasonably have protected its interests. This means that so long as there is an element of reliance on the part of the claimant, a respondent could be found to have engaged in misleading or deceptive conduct even if they had every reason to believe that their representations were true.

The reason for strict liability in this instance that a person making a representation is always better placed to know about whether or not it is true than the person relying on the representation, so the law is constructed to shift the onus of ensuring that the representation is true onto the person making it. This is in contrast to the traditional common law principle of "caveat emptor" or "let the buyer beware".

=== Loss ===
As a tort-style offence applying to cases of "pure economic loss" (as opposed to physical harm), a cause of action in misleading or deceptive conduct will only accrue from the time that any loss is suffered – i.e. conduct could be misleading and deceptive, and a person could rely on it and still have no claim. There would only be a claim when that person suffers a loss as a result of the conduct.

=== Other relevant matters ===
Individuals may be ancillary liable for breaches of s18 if they are "knowingly concerned" in the breach.

Where conduct is a representation about the future (as opposed to a representation about present facts), then that conduct will be taken to be misleading if the person making it cannot show they made the representation on reasonable grounds. In these situations, representations about the future are presumed to be misleading, and the burden of proof is on the person making the representation to produce evidence to show that they had reasonable grounds.

=== Contractual modification ===
Parties to a contract cannot exclude liability for misleading or deceptive conduct under section 18 of the Australian Consumer Law. Terms that purport to do so will be unenforceable to protect the public interest in ensuring that statutory remedies are available to persons who are misled or deceived into entering an agreement. As was stated in reference to section 52 of the Trade Practices Act 1974 (Cth), the modern equivalent of which is section 18 of the Australian Consumer Law:

49. Irrespective of the construction of these two special conditions it does not matter ultimately whether the impugned conduct with which this case is concerned falls literally within them or not. Section 52 is a section in the consumer protection provisions of an Act concerned to protect the public from misleading or deceptive conduct and unfair trade practices which may result in contravention of the Act. It has been held that exclusion clauses, of which special conditions 6 and 7 are examples, cannot operate to defeat claims under s. 52. It may be ... that such exclusion clauses will generally be ineffective because they cannot break the nexus between the conduct in contravention of s. 52 and the making of the agreement in issue. ... 50. There are wider objections to allowing effect to such clauses. Otherwise the operation of the Act, a public policy statute, could be ousted by private agreement. Parliament passed the Act to stamp out unfair or improper conduct in trade or in commerce; it would be contrary to public policy for special conditions such as those with which this contract was concerned to deny or prohibit a statutory remedy for offending conduct under the Act.

== Exceptions ==
Despite the strict liability nature of the offence, a person will not be deemed to have engaged in misleading or deceptive conduct where:

1. the circumstances make it apparent that the person is not the source of the information and that it expressly or impliedly disclaims any belief in its truth or falsity and is merely passing on the information for what it is worth;
2. the person, while believing the information, expressly or impliedly disclaims personal responsibility for what it conveys, for example, by disclaiming personal knowledge; or
3. the person, while believing the information, ensures that its name is not used in association with the information.

== Remedies ==
=== Fines ===
There are no pecuniary penalties available for a breach of section 18. However, for a breach of many of the related provisions in the Australian Consumer Law, the Australian Competition and Consumer Commission (ACCC) can seek pecuniary penalties. Following amendments commencing on 28 March 2026, the maximum penalty for a body corporate is the greatest of $100 million, three times the value of the benefit obtained from the conduct, or, where that value cannot be determined, 30 per cent of the corporation's adjusted turnover during the breach period. The maximum penalty for an individual is $2.5 million.

=== Damages ===
A victim of misleading or deceptive conduct is only entitled to damages (i.e., monetary compensation) if they have suffered loss or damage as a result of the conduct. The measure of loss or damage here is generally the same as it is in contract law or tort law. Since 2004, if a victim contributed to the loss or damage that they suffered, then the court can reduce the amount of damages that they are awarded, in a similar fashion to the reduction of damages in a negligence claim if the plaintiff is guilty of contributory negligence. However, if the person engaging in the conduct intended to mislead or deceive, or was fraudulent in their conduct, then the courts cannot reduce the damages.

There is a limitation period of six years on actions for damages.

== Notable cases ==
Because no pecuniary penalty attaches to section 18 itself, regulatory proceedings alleging misleading or deceptive conduct are commonly brought under section 18 together with the more specific prohibitions in Part 3-1 of the Australian Consumer Law, such as sections 29, 33 and 34, for which penalties are available.

In Australian Competition and Consumer Commission v TPG Internet Pty Ltd (2013) the High Court held that advertisements offering "unlimited" ADSL2+ broadband for $29.99 per month were misleading because the dominant message conveyed by the advertisements was not adequately qualified by less prominent text disclosing that the service had to be bundled with a home telephone line at additional cost. The Court observed that the advertisements had "selected some words for emphasis and relegated the balance to relative obscurity", and restored the $2 million penalty imposed at first instance. In Australian Competition and Consumer Commission v Coles Supermarkets Australia Pty Ltd (2026) the Federal Court found that Coles had contravened sections 18(1) and 29(1)(i) by advertising "Down Down" discounts on 245 grocery products whose higher "was" prices had applied only briefly following a price increase, holding that a former price must have applied for a reasonable period before a saving can be represented. Penalties were left to a later hearing, and a parallel proceeding against Woolworths was reserved.

Misleading claims about products have attracted substantial penalties. In 2016 the Full Federal Court increased to $6 million the penalty imposed on Reckitt Benckiser for representing that each product in the Nurofen "Specific Pain" range was formulated to treat a particular type of pain when all contained the same active ingredient, at the time the highest penalty awarded for misleading conduct under the Australian Consumer Law. That figure was exceeded in 2019, when the Federal Court ordered Volkswagen to pay $125 million over representations that more than 57,000 vehicles imported into Australia complied with diesel emissions standards, engine software having altered the vehicles' emissions behaviour during testing; the penalty was upheld on appeal in 2021 and the High Court refused special leave.

The doctrine has been applied to online intermediaries with differing results. In Google Inc v Australian Competition and Consumer Commission (2013) the High Court held that Google had not itself engaged in misleading conduct by displaying advertisers' sponsored links, because ordinary users would understand the search engine to be "only a means of communication between advertisers and consumers" rather than the source of the representations. By contrast, in 2022 the Federal Court ordered the hotel comparison site Trivago to pay $44.7 million after finding that its most prominently displayed room offers were determined largely by the fees paid to it by online booking sites rather than by price, and that strike-through price comparisons were drawn between different room types.

In Australian Competition and Consumer Commission v Qantas Airways Limited (2024) Qantas admitted contravening sections 18(1), 29(1)(b), 29(1)(g) and 34 by continuing to advertise and sell tickets for 70,543 flights for an average of 11 days after deciding to cancel them, affecting about 86,600 consumers, and by delaying notification of cancellation to holders of tickets on a further 60,297 flights, affecting up to about 884,000 consumers. The Federal Court imposed a $100 million penalty, and Qantas gave a court-enforceable undertaking to pay about $20 million to affected consumers.

Equivalent prohibitions apply to financial products and services under the Australian Securities and Investments Commission Act 2001. In 2024 the Federal Court ordered Vanguard Investments Australia, the Australian arm of Vanguard, to pay $12.9 million for representing that an "ethically conscious" bond index fund excluded issuers with significant fossil fuel business activities when a substantial proportion of the fund's holdings had not been screened against those criteria, at the time the largest penalty imposed in Australia for greenwashing.
