= Tacking (law) =

Tacking (an old form of “attaching”) is a legal right most usually relevant when the common law resolves competing priorities between two or more security interests arising over the same asset.

It is of two types:

1. Tacking the legal estate
2. Tacking further advances

Tacking the legal estate refers to the holder of an equitable mortgage getting better security by obtaining legal title to the security (whether by way of mortgage or otherwise). Usually this is prompted by their discovery, after they took their security, that there is an earlier equitable mortgage over the same asset. The effect of the tacking is to postpone (i.e., demote) the rights of the first creditor to those of the second: this follows the general principle that a legal interest takes priority over an equitable one.

Tacking further advances refers to the ability of a creditor (in some circumstances) to tack a later loan to security they took for an earlier loan, as in the following example:

1. Bank A lends a first advance to the borrower, which is secured by a mortgage over the borrower's property. The mortgage is expressed to secure this advance and any future advances.
2. Bank B subsequently lends other money to the borrower and takes a second ranking mortgage over the same property.
3. Bank A then subsequently lends a further, second advance to the borrower, relying on its original mortgage.

Bank A will always have a first priority claim against the property for the full amount of its first advance. But it will be able to claim against the property in priority to Bank B with respect to its second advance only if it is permitted to tack the second advance to the mortgage that was taken at the time the first advance was made. If Bank A is not permitted to tack the second advance, then Bank B's claim in respect of the sums that it lent will have priority over Bank A's claims with respect to the second advance.

The wider applications of tacking, which concern equitable claims to property more generally, are clear in the definition given by Black's Law Dictionary:

1. The joining of consecutive periods of possession by different persons to treat the periods as one continuous period; especially the adding of one's own period of land possession to that of a prior possessor to establish continuous Adverse possession for the statutory period.
2. The joining of a junior lien with the first lien in order to acquire priority over an intermediate lien.

Separately, in the definition of tabula in naufragio, Black's comments:

It may be fairly said that the doctrine survives only in the unjust and much criticised English rule of tacking.

== The common law rules ==
The right to tack was established by Sir Matthew Hale in Marsh v Lee in 1670, apparently as “tacking tabula in naufragio”. This was relatively soon followed by another landmark case, Gordon v Graham. (Note: Gordon v Graham, (1716) 2 Eq Cas Abr 598, 22 ER 502, as subsequently quoted in Hopkinson v Rolt: "A. mortgages to B. for a Term of Years, to secure a Sum of £ already lent to A., as also such other Sums as should hereafter be lent or advanced to him. A. makes a second Mortgage to C. for a certain Sum, with Notice of the first Mortgage; and then the first Mortgagee, having Notice of the second Mortgage, lends a further Sum.... Per Cowper, C. The second Mortgagee shall not redeem the first Mortgage, without paying as well the Money lent after, as that lent before the second Mortgage was made; for it was the Folly of the second Mortgagee, with Notice, to take such Security.")

During the nineteenth century, the authority of Gordon v Graham came to be doubted. It was questioned whether it had been correctly reported and, even if correctly reported, whether it correctly stated the law.

The matter came before the House of Lords in Hopkinson v Rolt. In that case, the borrower created a mortgage over his land which was expressed to "secure the sums due and which shall from time to time become due" to the bank. Later, he granted a second mortgage in favour of another creditor. Notice of the second mortgage was given to the bank. The borrower was later declared bankrupt, and a dispute arose as to the priority of the bank with respect to advances which were made under the first mortgage after it had received notice of the second mortgage.

The three law lords who heard the case were divided, with a majority favouring priority for the second mortgagee. Lord Campbell, the Lord Chancellor (with whom Lord Chelmsford agreed), opined:

I must say that the doctrine [in Gordon v Graham] seems to me to be contrary to principle. Although the mortgagor has parted with the legal interest in the hereditaments mortgaged, he remains the equitable owner of all his interest not transferred beneficially to the mortgagee, and he may still deal with his property in any way consistent with the rights of the mortgagee. How is the first mortgagee injured by the second mortgage being executed. . . ? The first mortgagee is secure as to past advances, and he is not under any obligation to make any farther advances (emphasis added). He has only to hold his hand when asked for a farther loan. Knowing the extent of the second mortgage, he may calculate that the hereditaments mortgaged are an ample security to the mortgagees; and if he doubts this, he closes his account with the mortgagor, and looks out for a better security.

The dissenting judge, Lord Cranworth, was in favour of upholding the rule in Gordon v Graham as it was reported. He expressed his view in a dissenting opinion:

I certainly had understood that in such a case, excluding all special circumstances, the first mortgagee would be secure for any subsequent advances covered by his security, even though he had notice of the second mortgage. This is so laid down on authority, has, I believe, been often acted on, and seems to me perfectly just and reasonable.

Mortgages are but contracts; and when once the rights of parties under them are defined and understood, it is impossible to say that any rule regulating their priority is unjust. If the law is once laid down and understood, that a person advancing money on a second mortgage, with notice of a prior mortgage covering future as well as present debts, will be postponed to the first mortgagee, to the whole extent covered or capable of being covered by the prior security, he has nothing to complain of. He is aware when he advances his money, of the imperfect nature of his security, and acts at his peril.

...

The rule ... is a convenient rule, causing injustice to no one. It has, probably, been often acted on, and to depart from it may, I think, retrospectively cause great injustice, and prospectively prevent advances of money by bankers or others, where such advances might be safely and usefully made.

=== Actual notice ===
Although for years it had been supposed that it was sufficient for the first mortgagee to have either actual or constructive notice of the second mortgage, in Westpac Banking Corporation v Adelaide Bank Limited it was held that constructive notice was not sufficient, and that a first mortgagee could tack future advances unless it had actual notice of the second ranking security.

=== Effect of subordination ===
Where a subordination agreement places a later mortgage in higher priority than one previously granted, the validity of releases granted by the previous mortgagors will have a significant impact on the priority assigned to each of the secured debts in question. In 2014, the Court of Appeal of Newfoundland and Labrador held in Medoc Properties Limited v. Standard Trust Company that the failure by an assignee to release one of two assigned mortgages with respect to such an agreement resulted in differing priorities given to them.

== Term loans and overdrafts ==
The common law rules relating to tacking have caused difficulty in relation to overdrafts and revolving loan facilities because of the rule in Clayton's Case, which provided that in relation to any account, payments into the account are presumed to discharge the earliest debts first. This has been held to have several effects:

- Where notice of a second mortgage is given, subsequent payments into the account are applied to reduce the overdraft existing at the time of the notice and, in effect, for the benefit of the subsequent mortgagee.
- The subsequent mortgagee takes subject to the overdraft only at that time, that is to say, not subject to future advances, and the reduction of the overdraft correspondingly improves his security. If the overdraft is paid off, then any subsequent indebtedness will be by way of future advances and the bank mortgage will be postponed entirely in relation to the subsequent mortgage, although the bank mortgage does not cease to be effective between the bank and its customer, the mortgagor.

The rule is only a presumption of convenience, but in practice it is difficult to displace, and can have a devastating effect on the security rights of first mortgagees. For example, suppose a customer secures an overdraft with a mortgage against their house. Then at a time when the overdraft stands at £100,000, the customer grants a second mortgage over their house as security for a term loan to another bank. If over the following nine months, the customer was to pay £90,000 into the account and draw a further £70,000 out of the account, the amount owed to the first bank would be reduced to only £80,000, but they would only have first ranking security for a mere £10,000. For the remaining £70,000 they would rank behind the second mortgagee.

Accordingly, in practice a bank will normally "break" an account when they receive notice of a subsequent charge over property which stands as security for an overdraft.

== Statutory modification ==
Ultimately, Hopkinson was thought to cause more inconvenience than it solved, and a number of common law jurisdictions have sought to modify the position by statute.

=== Modification in England and Wales ===
The Parliament of the United Kingdom has modified the application of the common law rules in several respects:

- With respect to unregistered land, s. 94 of the Law of Property Act 1925 enables further advances to be tacked onto a first mortgage if:

(a) the intervening mortgagee consents,
(b) the bank had no notice of the intervening mortgage at the time of the advance, (Note: but s. 94(2) provides that, "where the prior mortgage was made expressly for securing a current account or other further advances," registration of the charge does not constitute notice if it was not registered in a local deed registry at the time of its creation) or
(c) the original mortgage actually obliged the bank to make further advances.

- With respect to registered land, s. 49 of the Land Registration Act 2002 provides that a bank may tack if:

(a) the intervening mortgagee consents,
(b) the bank had no notice of the intervening mortgage from the subsequent mortgagee, or
(c) the original mortgage actually obliged the bank to make further advances and this agreement had been entered in the register prior to the creation of the subsequent charge.
