= Derry v Peek =

UK legal case

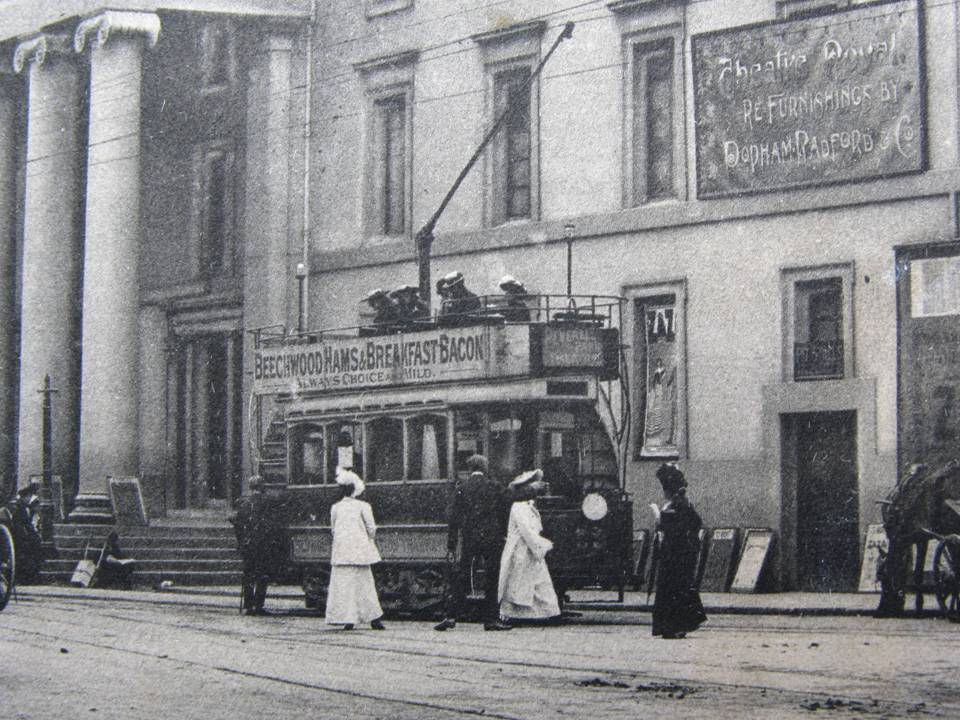
- Plymouth, Devonport and District Tramways
- Court: House of Lords
- Full case name: WILLIAM DERRY, J. C. WAKEFIELD, M. M. MOORE, J. PETHICK, AND S. J. WILDE v SIR HENRY WILLIAM PEEK, BARONET RESPONDENT
- Decided: 1 July 1889
- Citation: (1889) LR 14 App Cas 337, [1889] UKHL 1

Court membership
- Judges sitting: Lord Halsbury L.C., Lord Watson, Lord Bramwell, Lord FitzGerald, and Lord Herschell

Keywords
- Misrepresentation, fraud

Derry v Peek [1889] UKHL 1 is a case on English contract law, fraudulent misstatement, and the tort of deceit.

Derry v Peek established a three-part test for fraudulent misrepresentation, whereby the defendant is fraudulent if he:

(i) knows the statement to be false, or
(ii) does not believe in the statement, or
(iii) is reckless as to its truth.

The House of Lords determined that, when issuing a prospectus, a company has as no general duty to use "care and skill" in to avoid making misstatements. This point is no longer good law in cases where economic loss flows from non-fraudulent misstatements.

Within company law, this case has been qualified by statute, codified today in the Companies Act 2006, which now recognises the fundamental importance of full disclosure in securities markets, to avoid financial crises.

== Facts ==
The Plymouth, Devonport and District Tramways company issued a prospectus stating that the company had permission to use steam trams. In fact, the company had no such permission because the right to use steam power was subject to the Board of Trade's consent. The company applied, honestly believing that they would get permission because it was a mere formality. In reality, after the prospectus was issued, permission was refused and the company ended up in liquidation.

Led by Sir Henry Peek, shareholders who had purchased their stakes in the company on the faith of the statement sued the directors in misrepresentation.

== Judgment ==
The House of Lords held that the shareholders' action failed because it was not proved that the directors lacked honest belief in what they had said. Lord Herschell, however, pointed out that although unreasonableness of the grounds of belief is not deceitful, it is evidence from which deceit may be inferred. There are many cases,

"where the fact that an alleged belief was destitute of all reasonable foundation would suffice of itself to convince the court that it was not really entertained, and that the representation was a fraudulent one."

== Significance ==
The tort of deceit would have been established only if the misstatements had been fraudulently made. Derry v Peek thus validated the perspective of the majority judges in the Court of Appeal in Heaven v Pender. That is, for there to be deceit or fraud (which is the same) it must be shown that a defendant (i) knows a statement is untrue, or (ii) has no belief in its truth, or (iii) is reckless as to whether it is true or false.

Derry v Peek also outlined that no duty would be required in relationship to non-fraudulent misrepresentation, without the presence of a contract, a fiduciary relationship, fraud or deceit; but this was later overruled in Hedley Byrne v Heller.

The finding of fact that the directors "had an honest belief in the statement" runs contrary to the evidence that although they expected to get planning permission as a mere formality, they plainly knew that they did not yet have that permission.

== See also ==
- English tort law
- Contract law
- Equity
