= Donoghue v Stevenson =

1932 UK landmark court case on negligence

- Court: House of Lords
- Full case name: M'Alister (or Donoghue) (Pauper) v. Stevenson (Note: Scots law practice was to include both the married and maiden names of female litigants in the form "maiden name (or married name)". The maiden name for Donoghue, however, has been listed as both "McAlister" and "M'Alister" in the law reports, even though she was born May McAllister. "(Pauper)" indicates that Donoghue would have been unable to pay Stevenson's costs had she lost, but was granted an exemption from providing the required security.)
- Decided: 26 May 1932
- Citations: [1932] UKHL 100; [1932] SC (HL) 31; [1932] AC 562; [1932] All ER Rep 1
- Transcript: House of Lords transcript

Case history
- Prior action: Outer House of the Court of Session ([1930] SN 117)
- Appealed from: Inner House of the Court of Session ([1930] SN 138)

Court membership
- Judges sitting: Lord Buckmaster; Lord Atkin; Lord Tomlin; Lord Thankerton; Lord Macmillan

Case opinions
- Manufacturers have a legal duty of care to the ultimate consumers of their products if it is not possible for defects to be identified before the goods are received.

Keywords
- Delict; Duty of care; Negligence; Personal injury; Product liability; Tort

Donoghue v Stevenson [1932] AC 562 was a landmark court decision in Scots delict law and English tort law by the House of Lords. It laid the foundation of the modern law of negligence in common law jurisdictions worldwide, as well as in Scotland, establishing general principles of the duty of care.

Also known as the "Paisley Snail" or "Snail in the Bottle" case, the case involved Mrs May Donoghue drinking a bottle of ginger beer in a café in Paisley, Renfrewshire. Unbeknown to her or anybody else, a decomposed snail was in the bottle. She fell ill, and subsequently sued the ginger beer manufacturer, Mr Stevenson. The House of Lords held that the manufacturer owed a duty of care to her, which was breached because it was reasonably foreseeable that failure to ensure the product's safety would lead to harm to consumers. There was also a sufficiently proximate relationship between consumers and product manufacturers.

Prior to Donoghue v Stevenson, liability for personal injury in tort usually depended upon showing physical damage inflicted directly (trespass to the person) or indirectly (trespass on the case). Being made ill by consuming a noxious substance did not qualify as either, so the orthodox view was that Mrs Donoghue had no sustainable claim in law. However, the decision fundamentally created a new type of liability in law that did not depend upon any previously recognised category of tortious claims. This was an evolutionary step in the common law for tort and delict, moving from strict liability based upon direct physical contact to a fault-based system that only required injury. This evolution was taken further in the later decision of Letang v Cooper [1965] 1 QB 232 when it was held that actions should not be jointly pleaded in trespass and negligence, but in negligence alone.

== Background and facts ==
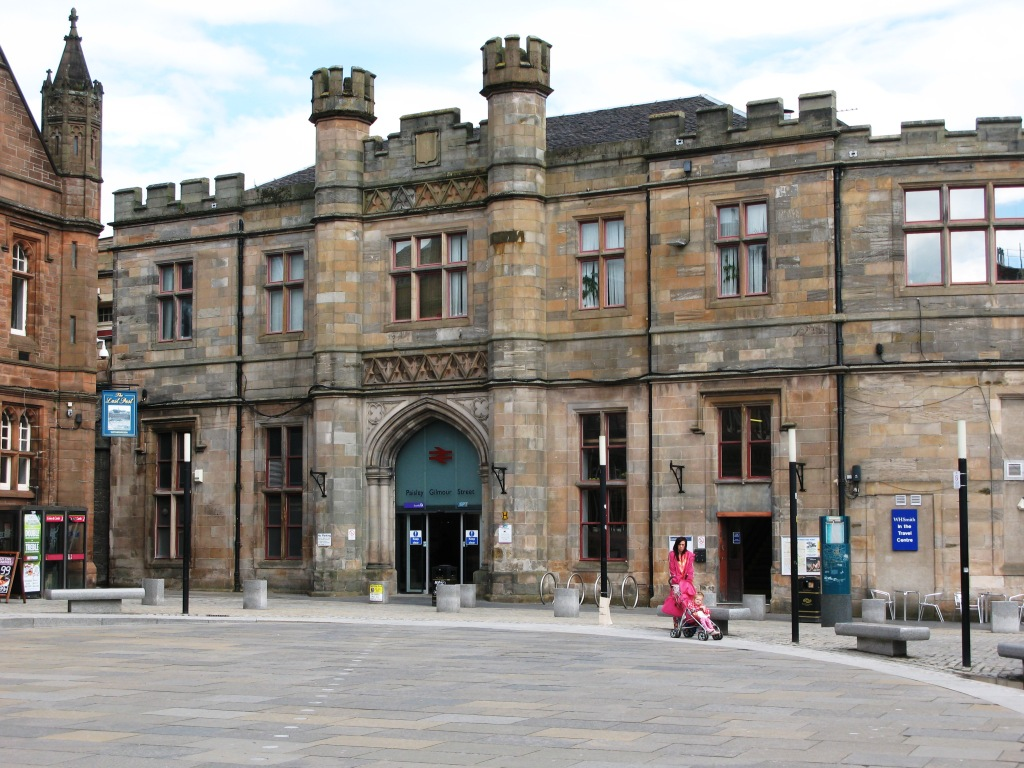
Gilmour Street station where Donoghue arrived in Paisley

On the evening of Sunday 26 August 1928, during the Glasgow Trades Holiday, May Donoghue took a train to Paisley, Renfrewshire. In Paisley, she went to the Wellmeadow Café. A friend, (Note: Although the friend was not named and has not been identified, she is referred to as "she" in the House of Lords judgment. It has been suggested that this information was provided by counsel during the hearing.) who was with her, ordered a pear and ice for herself. Donoghue asked for a Scotsman ice cream float, a mix of ice cream and ginger beer. The owner of the café, Francis Minghella, (Note: Minghella's surname was incorrectly spelt as "Minchella" in law reports of Donoghue v Stevenson.) brought over a tumbler of ice cream and poured ginger beer on it from a brown and opaque bottle labelled "D. Stevenson, Glen Lane, Paisley". Although the bottle was labelled as Stevenson's, McByde suggests it is possible it did not originally belong to him (Stevenson). Bottles were often reused, and in the process occasionally returned to the incorrect manufacturer. Moreover, Stevenson initially claimed he did not issue bottles matching the description provided by Donoghue.

Donoghue drank some of the ice cream float. When her friend poured the remaining ginger beer into the tumbler, a decomposed snail also floated out of the bottle. Donoghue claimed that she felt ill from this sight, complaining of abdominal pain. According to her later statements of facts, she was required to consult a doctor on 29 August and was admitted to Glasgow Royal Infirmary for "emergency treatment" on 16 September. She was subsequently diagnosed with severe gastroenteritis and shock.

The ginger beer had been manufactured by David Stevenson, who ran a company producing both ginger beer and lemonade at 11 and 12 Glen Lane, Paisley, less than 1 mile (1,600 m) from the Wellmeadow Café. The contact details for the ginger beer manufacturer were on the bottle label and recorded by Donoghue's friend.

Donoghue subsequently contacted and instructed Walter Leechman, a local solicitor and city councillor whose firm had acted for the claimants in a factually similar case, Mullen v AG Barr & Co Ltd, less than three weeks earlier (see also George v Skivington).

Despite the ruling in Mullen, Leechman issued a writ on Donoghue's behalf against Stevenson on 9 April 1929. The writ claimed £500 in damages, the same amount a claimant in Mullen had recovered at first instance, and £50 in costs. The total amount Donoghue attempted to recover would be approximately equivalent to £30,209 in 2025.

=== Condescendences ===
The full allegations made by Donoghue were presented in five condescendences, which claimed that Stevenson had a duty of care to Donoghue to ensure that snails did not get into his bottles of ginger beer, but that he had breached this duty by failing to provide a system to clean bottles effectively, a system that would usually be used in the business and was necessary given that the ginger beer was intended for human consumption. The ineffectiveness of the cleaning system was alleged to result from the bottles being left in places "to which it was obvious that snails had freedom of access ... and in which, indeed, snails and snail trails were frequently found", an allegation described by lawyer and author Matthew Chapman as "somewhat gratuitous". This breach of duty was alleged to have caused Donoghue's subsequent illness.

Stevenson responded to the condescendences by denying that any of his bottles of ginger beer had contained snails and "that the alleged injuries are grossly exaggerated ... any illness suffered by the [claimant] was due to the bad condition of her own health at the time". In response to the writ, Stevenson pleaded four main arguments:

- that the claim had no legal basis;
- that the facts could not be substantiated;
- that he had not caused Donoghue any injury;
- that the claimed amount was excessive.

=== Legal background ===
Injuries resulting from defective products were normally claimed on the basis of a contract of sale between the seller and the consumer. However, Donoghue had no contractual relationship with Minghella, the café owner as she had not purchased the ginger beer; while her friend did have a contract through having placed the order, she had not suffered any injury. Moreover, neither had a contract with Stevenson, the manufacturer. Donoghue was therefore required to claim damages for negligence.

Ansell v Waterhouse had established in 1817 that legal liability could arise for an act or omission "contrary to the duty which the law casts on him in the particular case" (i.e. negligence). However, there was no general duty of care and therefore no general liability for negligent behaviour. Only limited exceptions to this rule were made in which duties were found in specific circumstances, most of which had a contractual background.

The most difficult precedent for Donoghue was Mullen v AG Barr & Co Ltd, a recent (1929) Court of Session case. In Mullen, two children, John and Francis Mullen, and Jeanie Oribine had separately found dead mice in their bottles of ginger beer, manufactured by AG Barr & Co Ltd, and claimed to have become ill through drinking the tainted liquid. In separate hearings in Glasgow and Greenock Sheriff Court respectively, Orbine was successful in claiming compensation while the Mullens were not. The losing parties of both cases appealed to the Court of Session.

At the Court of Session, the claimants argued that although there was no direct evidence that the manufacturer had been negligent in preparing the ginger beer, negligence could be presumed (res ipsa loquitur) from the mere presence of dead mice in ginger beer bottles. However, the court ruled against the claimants. The majority held that on a factual basis AG Barr & Co Ltd had rebutted a presumption of negligence and that on a legal basis product manufacturers only owed a duty of care to the ultimate consumers if there was a contractual relationship between the parties; if the dangerousness of the product was intentionally withheld from the consumer (in which case there might also be a claim for fraud); or if there was no warning of the intrinsic dangerousness of certain products, such as explosives.

Only Lord Hunter dissented, finding that negligence to be inferred and that the fact that the bottle contents could not be examined (because of the dark glass) gave rise to a specific duty of care that would allow consumers to claim for damages.

However, neither of the circumstances in which negligence could be found in product liability cases applied to Donoghue: ginger beer is not intrinsically dangerous, nor did Stevenson intentionally misrepresent the threat it posed. Nevertheless, Donoghue's counsel argued that manufacturers also owed a duty of care to their ultimate consumers if it was not possible to examine the goods before they were used, an exception that would apply to Donoghue.

== Judgment ==
=== Court of Session, Outer House ===
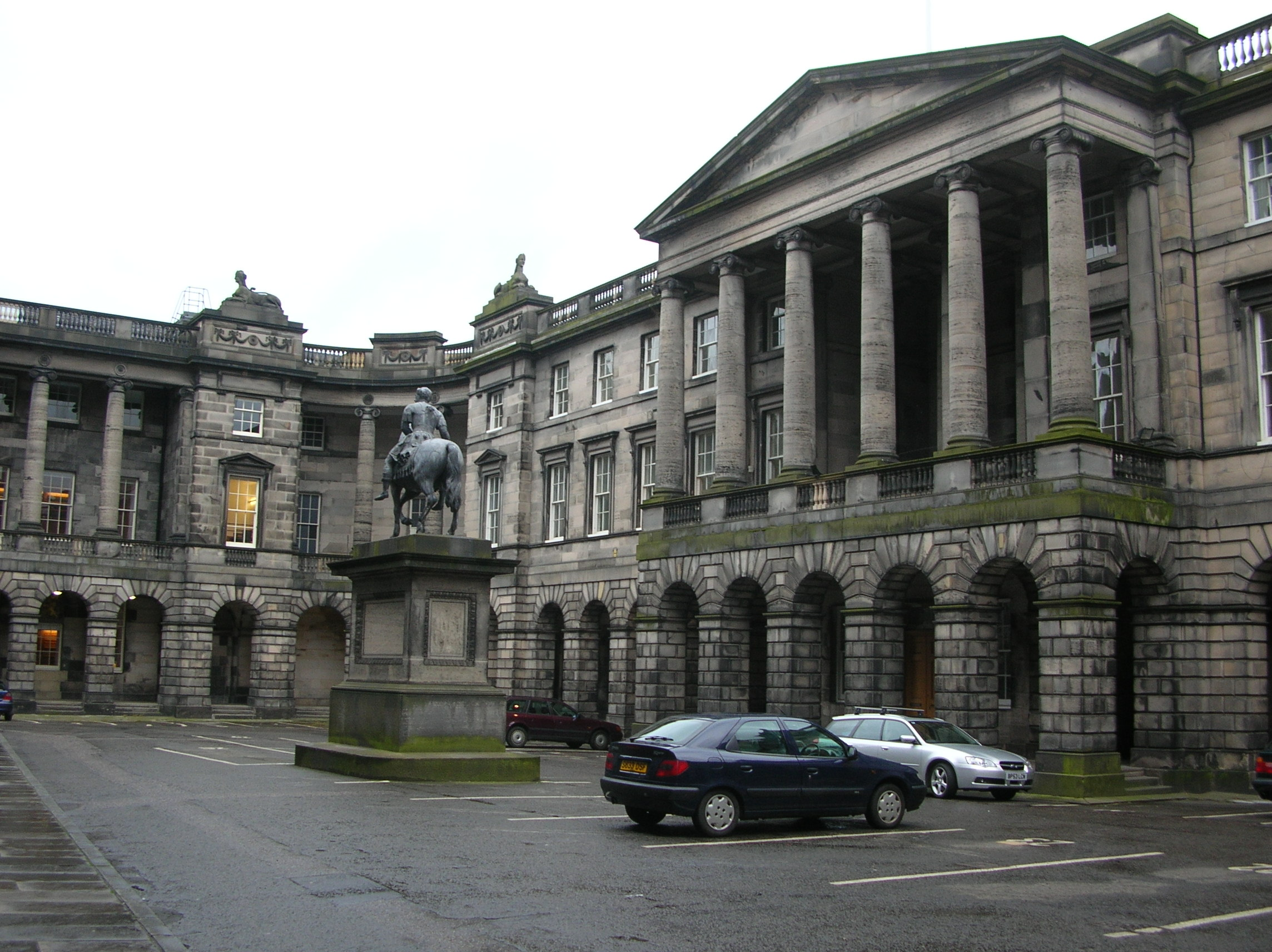
Parliament House in Edinburgh, where the Court of Session sits

The first interlocutory action was heard on the Court of Session on 21 May 1929 in front of Lord Moncrieff. After an adjournment, Minghella was added as a defender on 5 June; however, the claim against him was abandoned on 19 November, likely due to his lack of contractual relationship with Donoghue (Donoghue's friend had purchased the ginger beer) and his inability to examine the contents of the dark glass bottle. On 12 December, Minghella and Stevenson were awarded a combined costs claim of £108 6s 3d against Donoghue for this abandoned strand of litigation. However, it was recorded on 20 December that Donoghue did not pay the costs awarded to Minghella.

The case was heard by Lord Moncrieff in the Outer House on 27 June 1930. In his judgment, delivered on the same day, he held that, as a general principle, there should be liability for negligent preparation of food.

I am unhesitatingly of opinion that those who deal with the production of food or produce fluids for beverage purposes ought not to be heard to plead ignorance of the active danger which will be associated with their products, as a consequence of any imperfect observation of cleanliness at any stage in the course of the process of manufacture ... Tainted food when offered for sale is, in my opinion, amongst the most subtly potent of 'dangerous goods', and to deal in or prepare such food is highly relevant to infer a duty. I fail to see why the fact that the danger has been introduced by an act of negligence and does not advertise itself, should release the negligent manufacturer from a duty, or afford him a supplementary defence.

English case law that required that liability for injuries resulting from goods that were not intrinsically dangerous to have a contractual basis (breach of warranty) was dismissed by Lord Moncrieff (citing John Salmond) for the narrowness of the approach and because there was no decision that incorporated it into Scots law. Finally, Mullen, despite its factual similarity, was discounted by a "very close reading of the precedent opinions".

=== Court of Session, Inner House ===
Stevenson appealed the case to the Inner House, where it was heard by the same four judges who had found against Mullen: Lord Alness (the Lord Justice-Clerk), Lord Ormidale, Lord Hunter and Lord Anderson. In their judgment, given on 13 November 1930, they all referred back to and supported their statements in Mullen, Lord Alness observing that "the only difference – and, so far as I can see, it is not a material difference – between that case [Mullen] and this case [Donoghue] is that there we were dealing with a mouse in a ginger-beer bottle, and here we are dealing with a snail in a ginger-beer bottle". Thus, Lord Alness, Lord Ormidale and Lord Anderson all allowed the appeal while Lord Hunter dissented.

=== House of Lords ===
Donoghue filed a petition to appeal to the House of Lords on 25 February 1931. She also sought (and subsequently received) permission to pursue the case in forma pauperis (with the status of a pauper) – a status she had not, for unknown reasons, sought at the Court of Session – providing an affidavit declaring that "I am very poor, and am not worth in all the world the sum of five pounds, my wearing apparel and the subject matter of the said appeal only excepted". This claim was supported by the minister and two elders of her church and meant that Donoghue was not required to provide security for costs in case she lost the appeal. (Her legal team had agreed to work pro bono.)

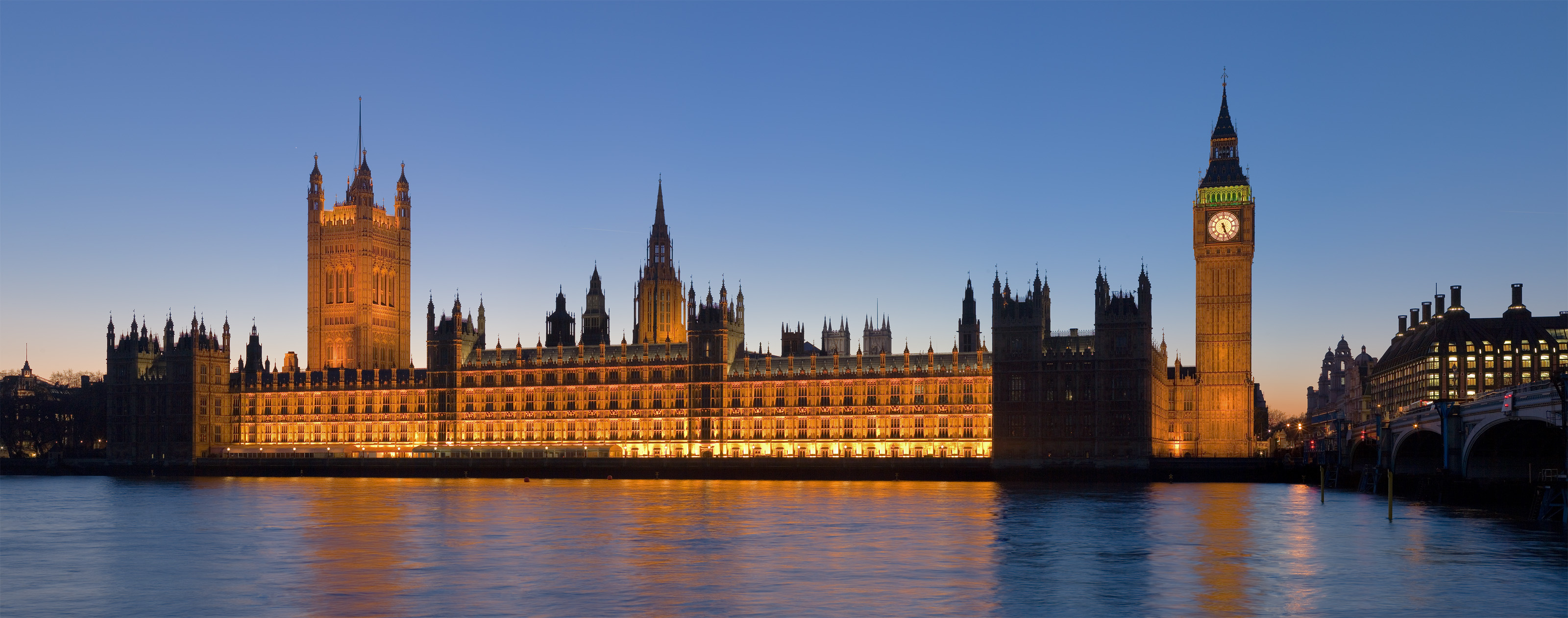
The Palace of Westminster, where five Lords of Appeal in Ordinary heard Donoghue's appeal

The petition was granted and the appeal was heard 10 and 11 December 1931 by Lord Buckmaster, Lord Atkin, Lord Tomlin, Lord Thankerton and Lord Macmillan. A supplementary statement from Donoghue's appeal papers indicates that her counsel, George Morton KC and William Milligan (later the Lord Advocate and a Privy Counsellor), argued that "where anyone performs an operation, such as the manufacture of an article, a relationship of duty independent of contract may in certain circumstance arise, the extent of such duty in every case depending on the particular circumstances of the case". Stevenson, they argued, owed a duty to take reasonable care in the manufacture of his ginger beer because the sealed bottles were opaque, and therefore could not be examined, and because the ginger beer was intended for human consumption.

Stevenson's counsel, Wilfrid Normand KC (Solicitor General for Scotland and later a Law Lord) and James Clyde (the latter later appointed the Lord President of the Court of Session and a Privy Counsellor), responded that "it is now firmly established both in English and Scottish law that in the ordinary case (which this is) the supplier or manufacturer of an article is under no duty to anyone with whom he is not in contractual relation". They denied that ginger beer was intrinsically dangerous or that Stevenson knew that the product was dangerous (the two established exceptions for finding a duty of care) and argued that the third exception that Donoghue was attempting to introduce had no basis in precedent.

The House of Lords gave judgment on 26 May 1932 after an unusually long delay of over five months since the hearing. (Note: Judgment was originally scheduled for 14 April, but was delayed for unknown reasons (although Alan Roger suggests that the delay gave Lord Macmillan time to rewrite his speech).) The court held by a majority of 3–2 that Donoghue's case disclosed a cause of action. The majority consisted of Lord Atkin, Lord Thankerton and Lord Macmillan.

Lord Atkin commented that he did "not think a more important problem has occupied your Lordships in your judicial capacity, important both because of its bearing on public health and because of the practical test which it applies to the system under which it arises". He agreed with counsel, based on his own research, that Scots and English law were identical in requiring a duty of care for negligence to be found and explained his general neighbour principle on when that duty of care arises.

At present I content myself with pointing out that in English law there must be, and is, some general conception of relations giving rise to a duty of care, of which the particular cases found in the books are but instances. The liability for negligence, whether you style it such or treat it as in other systems as a species of "culpa", is no doubt based upon a general public sentiment of moral wrongdoing for which the offender must pay. But acts or omissions which any moral code would censure cannot, in a practical world, be treated so as to give a right to every person injured by them to demand relief. In this way rules of law arise which limit the range of complainants and the extent of their remedy. The rule that you are to love your neighbour becomes in law, you must not injure your neighbour; and the lawyer's question, Who is my neighbour? receives a restricted reply. You must take reasonable care to avoid acts or omissions which you can reasonably foresee would be likely to injure your neighbour. Who, then, in law, is my neighbour? The answer seems to be – persons who are so closely and directly affected by my act that I ought reasonably to have them in contemplation as being so affected when I am directing my mind to the acts or omissions which are called in question.

He supported this broad test by citing Heaven v Pender and rejected the cases in favour of a narrower interpretation of a duty of care with the example of negligently poisoned food, for which there had been no claim against the manufacturer. "If this were the result of the authorities, I should consider the result a grave defect in the law, and so contrary to principle that I should hesitate long before following any decision to that effect which had not the authority of this House". He went on to suggest that there should be a duty of care owed by all manufacturers of "articles of common household use", listing medicine, soap and cleaning products as examples. "I do not think so ill of our jurisprudence as to suppose that its principles are so remote from the ordinary needs of civilised society and the ordinary claims it makes upon its members as to deny a legal remedy where there is so obviously a social wrong."

Lord Atkin then rejected cases that did not support his approach and cited Benjamin N. Cardozo in the New York case MacPherson v. Buick Motor Co. in favour of his view.

He concluded:

If your Lordships accept the view that this pleading discloses a relevant cause of action, you will be affirming the proposition that by Scots and English law alike a manufacturer of products, which he sells in such a form as to show that he intends them to reach the ultimate consumer in the form in which they left him, with no reasonable possibility of intermediate examination, and with the knowledge that the absence of reasonable care in the preparation or putting up of the products will result in an injury to the consumer's life or property, owes a duty to the consumer to take that reasonable care. It is a proposition which I venture to say no one in Scotland or England who was not a lawyer would for one moment doubt. It will be an advantage to make it clear that the law in this matter, as in most others, is in accordance with sound common sense. I think that this appeal should be allowed.

Lord Thankerton ruled that Donoghue had no contract with Stevenson, nor that her case was covered by one of the scenarios in which a duty of care had previously been found. However, he held that where goods could not be examined or interfered with, the manufacturer had "of his own accord, brought himself into direct relationship with the consumer, with the result that the consumer [was] entitled to rely upon the exercise of diligence by the manufacturer to secure that the article shall not be harmful to the consumer", an exception to the general nonexistence of a duty of care that applied to Donoghue.

Lord Thankerton further argued that it was impossible "to catalogue finally, amid the ever-varying types of human relationships, those relationships in which a duty to exercise care arises apart from contract" and commented that he "should be sorry to think that the meticulous care of the manufacturer to exclude interference or inspection by the [seller] should relieve the [seller] of any responsibility to the consumer without any corresponding assumption of duty by the manufacturer".

Lord Macmillan examined previous cases and held that "the law takes no cognisance of carelessness in the abstract. It concerns itself with carelessness only where there is a duty to take care and where failure in that duty has caused damage". Whether there was a duty and breach would be examined by the standard of the reasonable person. These circumstances "must adjust and adapt itself to the changing circumstances of life. The categories of negligence are never closed".

Lord Macmillan held that, according to this standard, Stevenson had demonstrated carelessness by leaving bottles where snails could access them; that he owed Donoghue a duty of care as commercial manufacturer of food and drink; and that Donoghue's injury was reasonably foreseeable. He therefore found that Donoghue had a cause of action and commented that he was "happy to think that in ... relation to the practical problem of everyday life which this appeal presents ... the principles of [English and Scots law] are sufficiently consonant with justice and common sense to admit of the claim which the appellant seeks to establish."

The minority consisted of Lord Buckmaster and Lord Tomlin. Lord Buckmaster focused on precedent, and commenced by warning that "although [common law] principles are capable of application to meet new conditions not contemplated when the law was laid down, these principles cannot be changed nor can additions be made to them because any particular meritorious case seems outside their ambit". He held that there were only the two recognised exceptions to the finding of a duty of care and supported Baron Alderson's judgment in Winterbottom v Wright that "the only safe rule is to confine the right to recover to those who enter into the contract; if we go one step beyond that, there is no reason why we should not go fifty".

Lord Buckmaster dismissed George v Skivington, opining that "few cases can have lived so dangerously and lived so long", and rejected Heaven as a tabula in naufragio (Latin: literally "plank in a shipwreck") that was unrelated to Donoghue's case; both "should be buried so securely that their perturbed spirits shall no longer vex the law". He concluded that there was no common law support for Donoghue's claim and supported Lord Anderson's judgment in Mullen.

In a case like the present, where the goods of the defenders are widely distributed throughout Scotland, it would seem little short of outrageous to make them responsible to members of the public for the condition of the contents of every bottle which issues from their works. It is obvious that, if such responsibility attached to the defenders, they might be called on to meet claims of damages which they could not possibly investigate or insure.

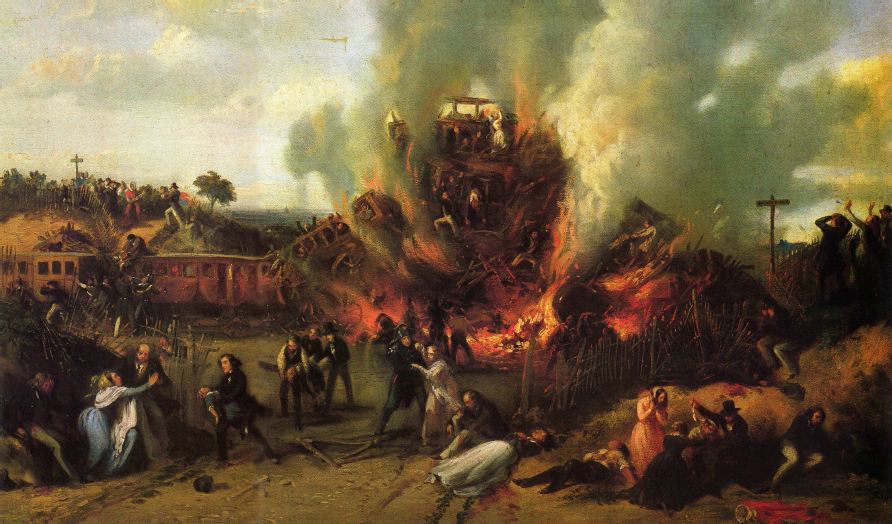
The 1842 Versailles rail accident Lord Tomlin referred to, in which over 70 people died when a train derailed; the cause was a broken axle.

Lord Tomlin concurred with Lord Buckmaster. While he agreed with Lord Atkin that the duty of care a manufacturer owed to its consumers was the same regardless of the product they produced, he held that no general duty of care existed and that the fact the product was in a sealed container made no difference to the finding of a such duty. He further endorsed concerns that Lord Atkin's broader test of liability would have allowed everyone injured in the Versailles rail accident to be able to claim compensation from the manufacturer of the axle that broke and caused the crash.

The suggested ratio decidendi (Latin: the reason for the decision) of the case has varied from the narrowest, jokingly suggested by Julius Stone, that there was merely a duty "not to sell opaque bottles of beverage containing dead snails to Scots widows", to the widest, suggested by Lord Normand, who had been one of Stevenson's counsel, that Lord Atkin's neighbour principle was the ratio.

Although the neighbour principle was a critical part of Lord Atkin's reasoning, and was therefore part of the ratio of his judgment, neither of the other judges in the majority expressly endorsed the principle. Robert Heuston therefore suggests that case only supports the claims there can be duties in tort even if there is no contract; that manufacturers owe a duty of care to the ultimate consumers of their goods; and possibly that negligence is a separate tort. "No amount of posthumous citation can of itself transfer with retrospective effect a proposition from the status of obiter dictum [passing comments] to that of ratio decidendi."

=== Subsequent events ===
The legal basis for the claim now settled, the case was returned to the Court of Session for a hearing scheduled for January 1933. In the hearing, Donoghue would have to prove the factual elements of the case that she had claimed, including that there had been a snail in the ginger beer as a result of Stevenson's negligence and that this snail had caused her illness. However, Stevenson died on 12 November 1932, aged 69. One year later, Stevenson's executors were listed as third-party defenders to the case. However, the claim was settled out of court in December 1934 for, according to Leechman's son, £200 of the £500 originally claimed. (Note: It has also been reported that the case was settled for £100 (by William McBryde on the basis of information from Lord Macmillan, which he probably heard from Lord Normand, one of Stevenson's counsel) and £500 (by Thomas Donoghue, May Donoghue's grandson; however, this amount is likely to be an exaggeration as it was the amount Donoghue originally claimed).)

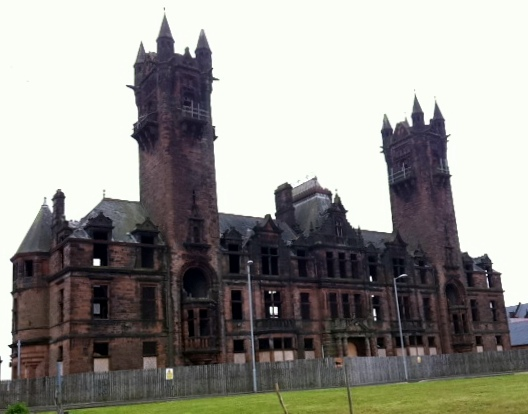
Gartloch Mental Hospital, where Donoghue died in 1958

Donoghue had moved to 101 Maitland Street with her son, Henry, around February 1931. He moved out when he married in 1937, after which she moved to 156 Jamieson Street. She continued to work as a shop assistant. In February 1945, Donoghue divorced her husband, from whom she had separated in 1928 and who now had two sons by another woman, and reverted to using her maiden name.

She died of a heart attack on 19 March 1958, at the age of 59, in Gartloch Mental Hospital, where she had probably been staying for a short period of time as a result of mental illness. Although she is listed on her death certificate as May McAllister, she was by then commonly known as Mabel Hannah, having adopted her mother's maiden name and the first name of her daughter, who had died when she was eleven days old.

Stevenson's business was taken over by his widow, Mary, and his son, the third David Stevenson in the family. It became a limited company (David Stevenson (Beers and Minerals) Limited) on 1 July 1950; the family sold their shares in 1956. The Glen Lane manufacturing plant was demolished in the 1960s.

The Wellmeadow Café, where the snail had been found, closed around 1931; the building was demolished in 1959. Minghella, its owner, subsequently became a labourer; he died on 20 March 1970.

== Significance ==
Lord Atkin's neighbour principle, that people must take reasonable care not to injure others who could foreseeably be affected by their action or inaction, was supported by reference to the biblical Great Commandment (to love one's neighbour as oneself) and the Parable of the Good Samaritan (defining who that "neighbour" was).

The neighbour principle itself was first mentioned in relation to law by Francis Buller (Note: Although authorship of An Introduction to the Law relative to Trials at Nisi Prius has also been attributed to Lord Bathurst.) in An Introduction to the Law relative to Trials at Nisi Prius, which was printed in 1768.

Of Injuries arising from Negligence or Folly. Every man ought to take reasonable care that he does not injure his neighbour; therefore, wherever a man receives any hurt through the default of another, though the same were not wilful, yet if it be occasioned by negligence or folly, the law gives him an action to recover damages for the injury so sustained.

In precedent, there was an obiter suggestion by Lord Esher in Heaven v Pender that "whenever one person is by circumstances placed in such a position with regard to another that every one of ordinary sense ... would at once recognise that if he did not use ordinary care and skill in his own conduct ... he would cause danger of injury to the person or property of the other, a duty arises to use ordinary care and skill to avoid such danger". However, this approach had been rejected by the two other judges in the Court of Appeal. Lord Esher's attempt to reintroduce the principle in further obiter remarks in Le Lievre v Gould, in which he stated that Heaven only established that there may be a duty even if there is no contract and that this duty arose if there was proximity between the parties, was also unsuccessful.

Two cases from the New York Court of Appeals, Thomas v. Winchester and MacPherson v. Buick Motor Co., were also influential in the formation of the neighbour principle. In Thomas, Thomas had purchased and administered belladonna to his wife after it was mislabelled by Winchester, the dealer, although not the seller, of the treatment as extract of dandelion. Thomas' wife became seriously ill as a consequence and Thomas successfully claimed in negligence; Winchester's behaviour had created an imminent danger which justified a finding of a duty of care.

This principle was relied on in MacPherson, in which a car wheel collapsed, injuring MacPherson. The manufacturer was sued in negligence and the court held that manufacturers could owe their ultimate consumers a duty of care in limited circumstances.

If the nature of a thing is such that it is reasonably certain to place life and limb in peril when negligently made, it is then a thing of danger. Its nature gives warning of the consequences to be expected. If to the element of danger there is added knowledge that the thing will be used by persons other than the purchaser, and used without new tests, then, irrespective of contract, the manufacturer of this thing of danger is under a duty to make it carefully ... If he is negligent, where danger is to be foreseen, a liability will follow.

Lord Atkin used the concept of legal neighbours in an address to the University of Birmingham's Holdsworth Club on 9 May 1930, in which he commented that "the man who swears unto his neighbour and disappointeth him not is a person commended by the law of morality, and the Law enforces that by an action for breach of contract". On 28 October 1931, just over one month before he heard Donoghue, Lord Atkin also used the principle in relation to defamation, perjury, fraud and negligence in a lecture at King's College London.

[A man] is not to injure his neighbour by acts of negligence; and that certainly covers a very large field of the law. I doubt whether the whole law of tort could not be comprised in the golden maxim to do unto your neighbour as you would that he should do unto you. (Note: The biblical version of the Golden Maxim requires that "thou shalt not avenge, nor bear any grudge against the children of thy people, but thou shalt love thy neighbour as thyself." The last part is repeated by Jesus in the Gospels as the second greatest commandment.)

=== Precedent ===
The case was reviewed by Frederick Pollock in a 1933 edition of Law Quarterly Review, in which he commented that there was no doubt as to the importance of the decision and that "a notable step has been made in enlarging and clarifying our conception of a citizen's duty before the law ... not to turn dangerous or noxious things loose on the world". However, Donoghue otherwise attracted little attention; it was understood only as precedent that manufacturers were liable for injuries their goods cause their ultimate consumers rather than that there was a general principle of liability in negligence.

The majority of the Court of Appeal (Lord Justice Cohen and Lord Justice Asquith) therefore held in Candler v Crane, Christmas & Co that Donoghue had not affected tortious liability for negligent misstatement. This narrow understanding of Donoghue changed with the cases of Hedley Byrne v Heller in 1963 and Home Office v Dorset Yacht Co in 1970.

=== Hedley Byrne v Heller ===
In Hedley Byrne, Hedley Byrne, advertising agents, had been indirectly informed by Heller & Partners Ltd, the bankers of Easipower, a company wishing to place a large order, that Easipower was a "respectably constituted company, considered good for its ordinary business engagements". Hedley Byrne relied on this information and subsequently lost over £17,000 when Easipower went into liquidation. The House of Lords held that Heller owed Hedley Byrne a duty of care as they used a special skill for Hedley Byrne and because this skill was relied upon by the company (although the negligence claim was unsuccessful due to a disclaimer of responsibility included in Heller's letter).

The application of Donoghue was discussed and, while all the judges agreed that it would be taking Donoghue too far to immediately apply it to Hedley Byrne, Lord Devlin suggested that "what Lord Atkin did was to use his general conception [the neighbour principle] to open up a category of cases giving rise to a special duty" and that the case could incrementally expand the duty of care.

=== Home Office v Dorset Yacht Co ===
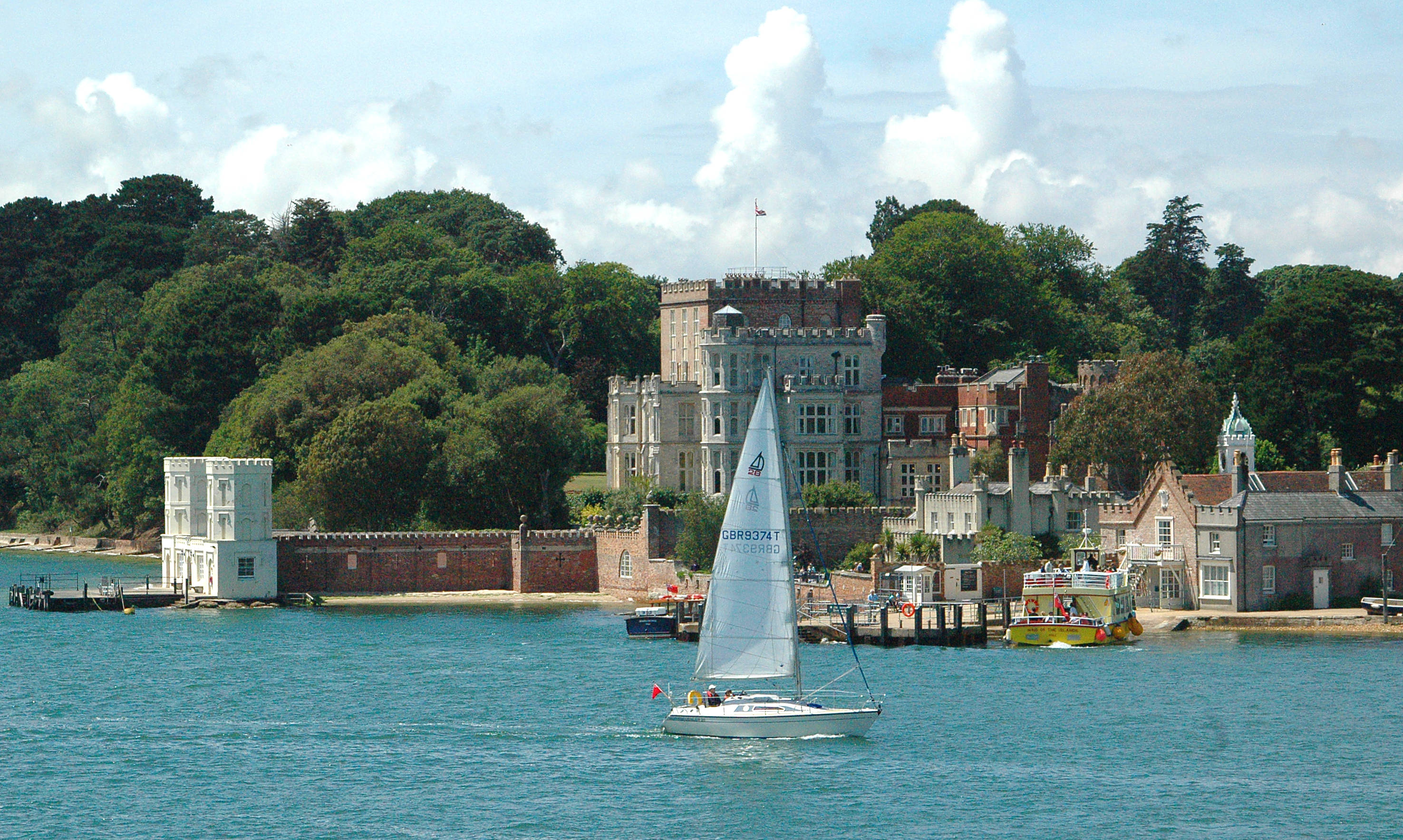
Brownsea Island, where some young offenders were taken in an apparent attempt to replicate Brownsea Island Scout camp

Home Office was the culmination of a movement from duties of care being found in specific circumstances to using the neighbour principle as a general duty of care. In Home Office, the Home Office had in 1962 taken a group of boys from a borstal to Brownsea Island in Poole Harbour, where seven had escaped overnight and collided one yacht with another belonging to Dorset Yacht Company. The company sued the Home Office for negligence and a preliminary issue, whether the Home Office owed a duty of care to Dorset Yacht Company, was found in the company's favour by both the High Court and the Court of Appeal. The case was appealed to the House of Lords, who held by a majority that the Home Office did owe a duty of care.

Lord Reid, giving the leading judgment, rejected the argument that there was no precedent for the claim, instead acknowledging "a steady trend towards regarding the law of negligence as depending on principle so that, when a new point emerges, one should ask not whether it is covered by authority but whether recognised principles [from Donoghue] apply to it". Donoghue, he argued, should therefore be applied in almost all circumstances.

[Donoghue] may be regarded as a milestone, and the well-known passage in Lord Atkin's speech should I think be regarded as a statement of principle. It is not to be treated as if it were a statutory definition. It will require qualification in new circumstances. But I think that the time has come when we can and should say that it ought to apply unless there is some justification or valid explanation for its exclusion.

In the sole dissenting judgment, Viscount Dilhorne held that the neighbour principle could not have been intended to be applied in all circumstances and that it could only be used to determine to whom a duty of care is owed rather than if one exists. Judges, he opined, "are concerned not with what the law should be but with what it is. The absence of authority shows that no such duty [to Dorset Yacht Company] now exists. If there should be one, that is, in my view, a matter for the legislature and not for the courts". Chapman comments "that this conclusion appeared ... distinctly quaint, old-fashioned and even untenable in the light of [Donoghue] shows how far the law had moved in the four decades which separated the two House of Lords decisions".

=== Caparo Industries plc v Dickman ===
In 1990, the House of Lords revised Lord Atkin's "neighbour" principle to encompass public policy concerns articulated in Caparo Industries plc v Dickman. The three-stage Caparo test for establishing a duty of care requires (i) foreseeability of damage, (ii) a relationship characterised by the law as one of proximity or neighbourhood, and (iii) that the situation should be one in which the court considers it would be fair, just and reasonable that the law should impose a duty of given scope on one party for the benefit of the other. In other jurisdictions, such as New Zealand, there is now a two-part test for novel fact situations, where the establishment of a duty must be balanced against applicable policy matters.

=== Comparative law ===
The judgment and reasoning of Lord Atkin in Donoghue v Stevenson is very similar to the judgment and reasoning applied by Cardozo CJ in the American case of Palsgraf v. Long Island Railroad Co., four years earlier. Although the similarity in approach has been noted by commentators, the decision in Palsgraf was not cited in either argument or in the judgments in Donoghue, although Lord Atkin did refer to an earlier decision of Cardozo J: MacPherson v. Buick Motor Co..

=== As a metaphor ===
Today the far reaching changes of the decision for the law of torts is sufficiently well recognised that the case's name is used as a metaphor. For example, Barclays Bank v W J Simms [1980] 1 QB 677 has been described as "the Donoghue v Stevenson of restitution for mistake". It has also been stated that Slade's Case "could be said to be the Donoghue v. Stevenson of contract". Similarly, Jarvis v Swans Tours Ltd has been called "the Donoghue v Stevenson of Tourism Law".

=== Commemoration ===
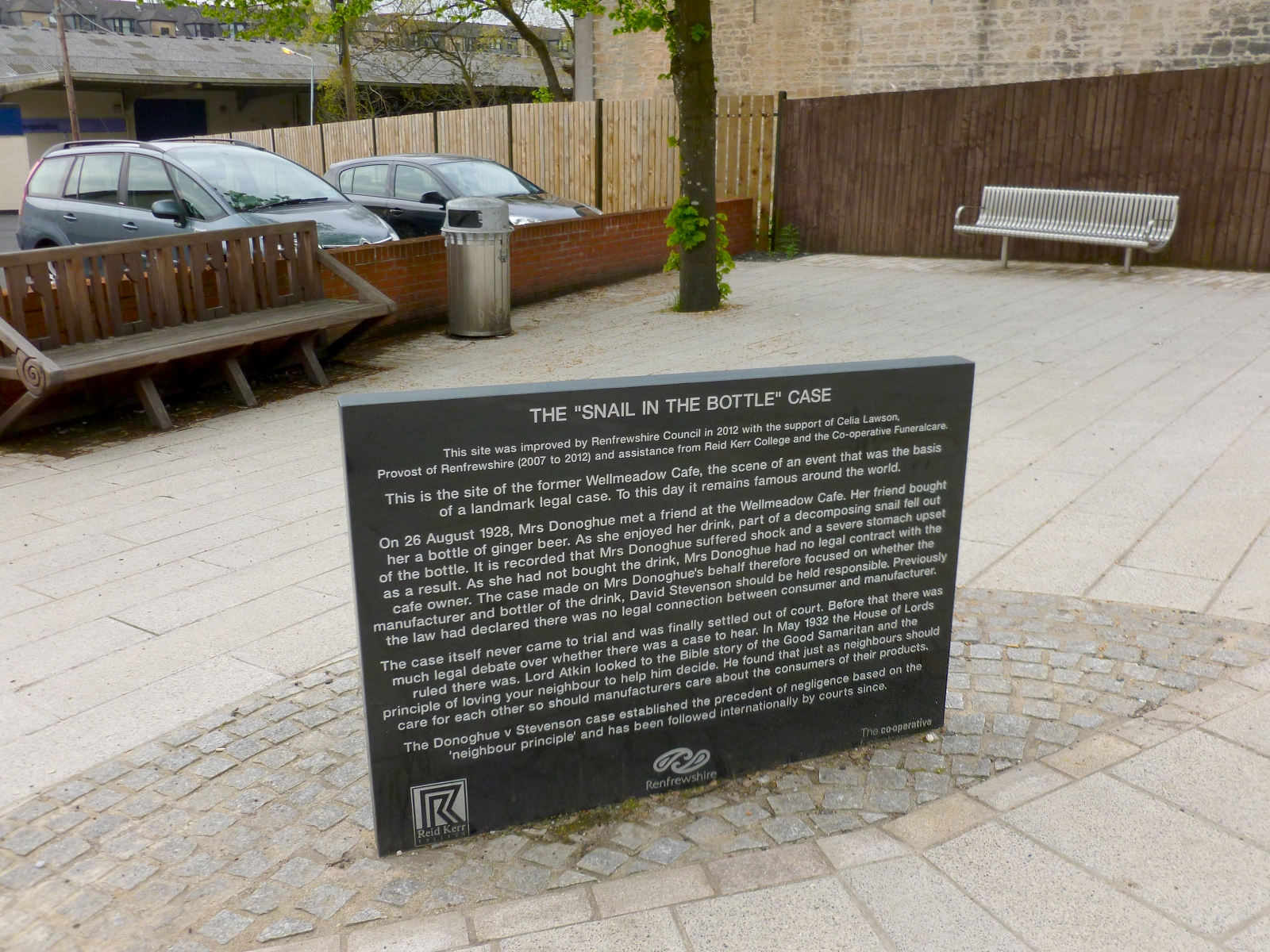
A memorial to the case on the former site of the Wellmeadow Cafe

In 1990, a pilgrimage to Paisley was organised by the Canadian Bar Association, the Faculty of Advocates and the Law Society of Scotland. This included a conference in Paisley Town Hall entitled "The Pilgrimage to Paisley: a Salute to Donoghue v Stevenson". A memorial commemorating the case was unveiled at the conference on the site of the former Wellmeadow Café and a bench was added in 1992; both were replaced in 2012.

In 1996, retired Canadian judge Martin Taylor together with David Hay QC and Michael Doherty produced a documentary on the case: The Paisley Snail.

=== Existence of the snail ===
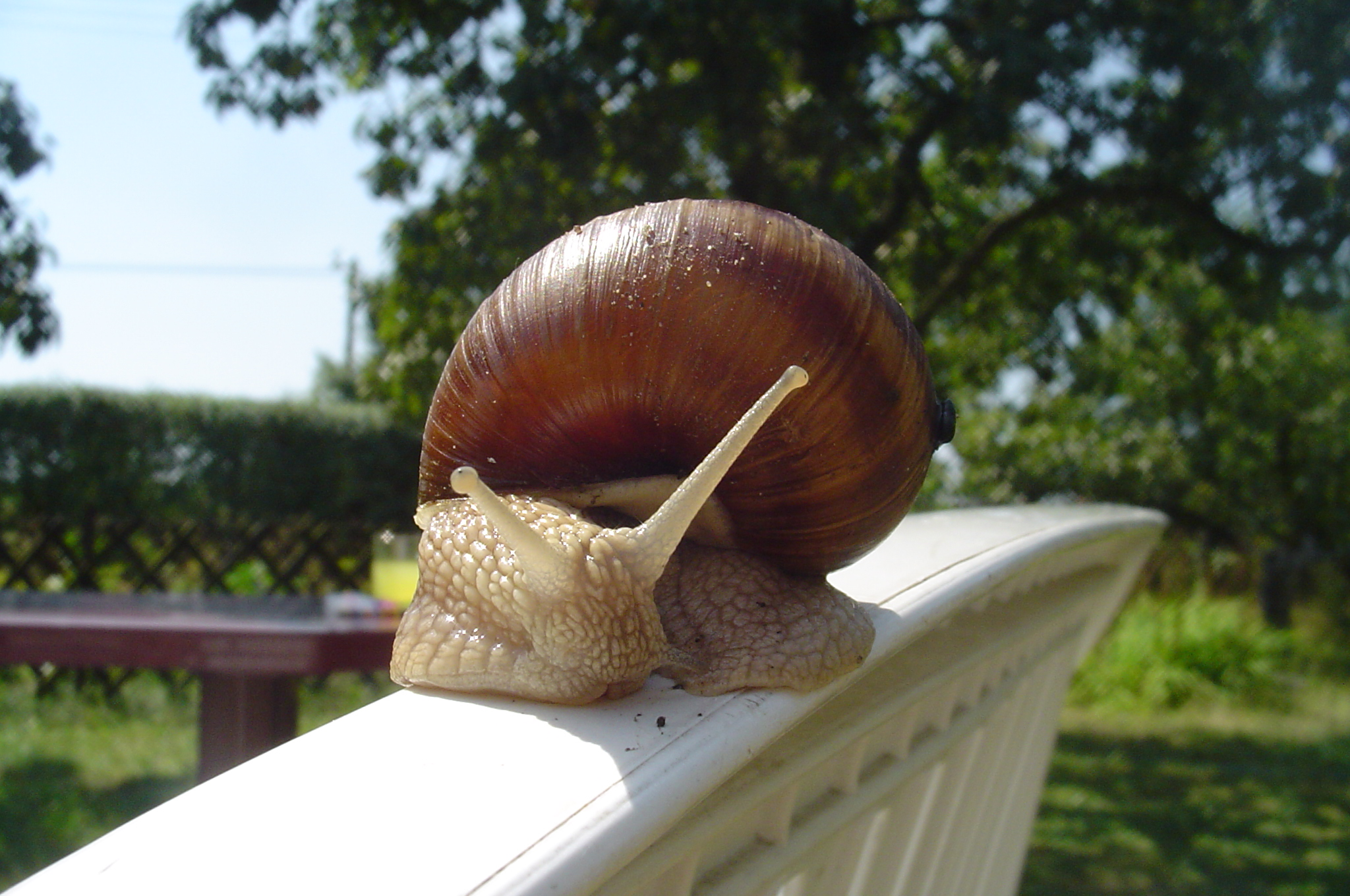
The existence of the Paisley Snail has been doubted.

In a speech scheduled to be delivered in May 1942 (although delayed by the Second World War), Lord Justice MacKinnon jokingly suggested that it had been proven that Donoghue did not find a snail in the bottle.

To be quite candid, I detest that snail ... I think that [Lord Normand] did not reveal to you that when the law had been settled by the House of Lords, the case went back to Edinburgh to be tried on the facts. And at that trial it was found that there never was a snail in the bottle at all. That intruding gastropod was as much a legal fiction as the Casual Ejector.

This allegation, suggests Chapman, established itself as a legal myth; it was repeated by Lord Justice Jenkins in a 1954 Court of Appeal practice note. However, both MacKinnon and Jenkins were unaware that the trial had not gone ahead because of Stevenson's death, and the events following the case were only published in response to the practice note. As Donoghue's factual claims were therefore never tested in court, it is generally held that what happened in the Wellmeadow Café is not proven and will not be known for certain.
