= George v Skivington =

1869 English case in negligence

- Decided: 1869
- Citation: 3 H&N 211; 157 ER 448

Case history
- Related action: Donoghue v Stevenson

Court membership
- Judge sitting: Baron Pollock

Keywords
- Tort law

George v Skivington (1869) is an English tort law case where it was held that a manufacturer who places a product intended for human consumption into the market, in a form that is liable for damage and who fails to exercise reasonable care to ensure that the product is suitable for human consumption, could be sued for damages by the victims.

== Facts ==
In 1869, when Mr George bought hair wash for his wife, who used it and was injured by the improperly manufactured product, he sued Mr Skivington (the manufacturer) and won the case, even though his wife was not a party to the contract.

== Judgement ==
Plaintiff was successful in his claim because the manufacturer knew the product was negligently made. The court awarded damages for the manufacturer failing to foresee reasonable omissions in a breach on contract.

== Significance ==
George v Skivington represented the first time in British common law, a third party or persons, which was not directly involved in the incident. The decision was used by Mrs Donoghue in the 1932 case Donoghue v Stevenson, as a precedent to support her case. This case supported Mrs Donoghue's claim that manufacturers owed a duty of care to the people using their products, even when bought by one person, and used by another (an outside party).

== See also ==
- English tort law
