= Heaven v Pender =

- Citation: (1883) 11 QBD 503

Heaven v Pender (1883) (11 QBD 503, Court of Appeal) was an English tort law case, which foreshadowed the birth of the modern law of negligence.

== Facts ==
Pender was the owner of a dry dock used for ship works, and Heaven was a ship painter who was using some staging slung over the side of a ship he was painting, supported by ropes. These ropes had previously been damaged and evidence showed that they were unfit for use. The painter was injured. In a summary advanced in relation to a later House of Lords case, Caledonian Railway Co. v. Warwick (1897), Lord Herschell stated that the dry dock's supporting apparatus

was part of the facilities which the dock afforded, just as they did by their cranes, their warehouses, or any other appliances, to the vessels that came to use their docks. This particular appliance was in such a condition that a person going upon it, trusting, as he would have a right to trust, that he might go upon it safely because it would bear his weight, was led into what has been called a trap, by which he sustained an injury. He was there upon the invitation of the dock company, and although it is true that the staging was used for painting a ship, it was part of the appliances, supplied by the dock company for purposes connected with the carrying on of their business. It was one of the facilities given by which they induced vessels to use their docks that they did supply these appliances[.] It was said that they had invited the plaintiff to come upon that staging, and that they were responsible if the man so invited was led into the trap by means of which he was injured.

== Judgment ==
(Brett MR – minority):

Whenever one person is by circumstances placed in such a position with regard to another that everyone of ordinary sense who did think would at once recognise that if he did not use ordinary care and skill in his own conduct with regard to those circumstances he would cause danger of injury to the person or property of the other, a duty arises to use ordinary skill and avoid such danger.

Tort law should assume a broad view of this area. If any person with ordinary sense realises that if they did not use proper care and skill, damage could be occasioned to another or another's property from their actions, they should be held liable.

=== Court of Appeal ===
The Master of the Rolls, William Brett, 1st Viscount Esher, suggested that there was a wider duty to be responsible in tort to those who might be injured if "ordinary care and skill" was not exercised.

Brett MR's obiter views would later be expressly adopted by Lord Atkin in the House of Lords in Donoghue v Stevenson, when the general concept of a tortious duty of care in negligence was established under English law.

=== House of Lords ===
The House of Lords was content to decide the case on the basis that a duty of care was owed by an occupier of land (the owner of the dry dock) to invitees (the employees of the contractor who were on the site to the economic benefit ultimately of the dry dock owner).
