= White v Jones =

- Court: House of Lords
- Decided: 16 February 1995
- Citations: [1995] UKHL 5, [1995] 2 AC 207, [1995] 1 All ER 691

Court membership
- Judges sitting: Lord Keith of Kinkel, Lord Goff of Chieveley, Lord Browne-Wilkinson, Lord Mustill and Lord Nolan

Case opinions
- Concurrence: Lord Goff of Chieveley, Lord Browne-Wilkinson and Lord Nolan
- Dissent: Lord Keith of Kinkel and Lord Mustill

Keywords
- Professional negligence, assumption of responsibility

White v Jones [1995] UKHL 5 is a leading English tort law case concerning professional negligence and the conditions under which a person will be taken to have assumed responsibility for the welfare of another.

== Facts ==
Two daughters of the deceased Mr Barratt (one of them married a man named White) sued Mr Jones for failing to follow their father's instructions when drawing up his will. Mr Barratt and his daughters had fallen out briefly and he asked the solicitor to cut them out of the will. Before he died they resolved their problems. He asked Mr Jones to change the will again so that £9,000 would be given to his daughters. After he died, with the will still the same, the family would not agree to have the settlement changed. The question was whether Mr Jones could be sued instead.

== Judgment ==
Lord Goff held with a majority of three to two in the House of Lords that the daughters would be able to claim. Influenced by the idea that solicitors may escape the consequences of not doing their job properly, he said that a special relationship existed between the daughters and the solicitor and that Mr Jones had assumed responsibility towards them. Therefore, the Caparo test was satisfied as the loss was foreseeable. This was so even though there was no contract or fiduciary relationship between them.

== See also ==
- Ross v Caunters [1980] Ch 297, Megarry VC held that a solicitor could be held liable to a disappointed beneficiary if the will turned out to be invalid.
