= Hedley Byrne & Co Ltd v Heller & Partners Ltd =

English tort case on economic loss from negligent misstatements

Hedley Byrne v Heller
- Court: House of Lords
- Decided: 28 May 1963
- Citation: [1964] AC 465, [1963] 2 All ER 575, [1963] 3 WLR 101, [1963] UKHL 4

Court membership
- Judges sitting: Lord Reid, Lord Morris of Borth-y-Gest, Lord Hodson, Lord Devlin and Lord Pearce

Keywords
- negligent misrepresentation, assumption of responsibility

Hedley Byrne & Co Ltd v Heller & Partners Ltd is an English tort law case on economic loss in English tort law resulting from a negligent misstatement. Prior to the decision, the notion that a party may owe another a duty of care for statements made in reliance had been rejected, with the only remedy for such losses being in contract law. The House of Lords overruled the previous position, in recognising liability for pure economic loss not arising from a contractual relationship, applying to commercial negligence the principle of "assumption of responsibility".

== Facts ==
Hedley Byrne were a firm of advertising agents. A customer, Easipower Ltd, put in a large order. Hedley Byrne wanted to check their financial position, and creditworthiness, and so asked their bank, (Note: National Provincial Bank) to acquire a report from Easipower’s bank, Heller & Partners Ltd., who replied in a letter that was headed,

without responsibility on the part of this bank

...Easipower is,

considered good for its ordinary business engagements.

The letter was sent for free. Easipower soon went into liquidation, and Hedley Byrne lost £17,000 (equivalent to £470,000 in 2023) on contracts. Hedley Byrne sued Heller & Partners for negligence, claiming that the information was given negligently and was misleading. Heller & Partners argued:

- Lack of a direct nexus, also known as proximity in negligence law (nor an assumption of responsibility of a type established in law) of duty of care. If so, this would mean none was owed regarding the statements.
- Liability was excluded; the header disclaimer used would make it unreasonable to rely on the bank reference/solvency statement, even if the law recognised some degree of duty of care owed.

== Judgment ==
The court found:

- the relationship between the parties was "sufficiently proximate" as to create a duty of care. It was reasonable for them to have known that the information that they had given would likely have been relied upon for entering into a contract of some sort. That would give rise, the court said, to a "special relationship", in which the defendant would have to take sufficient care in giving advice to avoid negligence liability. The relationship was that the plaintiff trusted the defendant with the information and therefore the defendant ought to have been honest
- however, on the facts, the disclaimer was sufficient to discharge any duty created by Heller's actions. There were no orders for damages, because,

A man cannot be said voluntarily to be undertaking a responsibility if at the very moment when he is said to be accepting it he declares that in fact he is not.

Lord Morris of Borth-y-Gest wrote,

I consider that it follows and that it should now be regarded as settled that if someone possessing special skill undertakes, quite irrespective of contract, to apply that skill for the assistance of another person who relies upon such skill, a duty of care will arise. The fact that the service is to be given by means of or by the instrumentality of words can make no difference. Furthermore, if in a sphere in which a person is so placed that others could reasonably rely upon his judgment or his skill or upon his ability to make careful inquiry, a person takes it upon himself to give information or advice to, or allows his information or advice to be passed on to, another person who, as he knows or should know, will place reliance upon it, then a duty of care will arise. ...in my judgment, the bank in the present case, by the words which they employed, effectively disclaimed any assumption of a duty of care. They stated that they only responded to the inquiry on the basis that their reply was without responsibility. If the inquirers chose to receive and act upon the reply they cannot disregard the definite terms upon which it was given. They cannot accept a reply given with a stipulation and then reject the stipulation. Furthermore, within accepted principles... the words employed were apt to exclude any liability for negligence.

Effectively, the House of Lords had chosen to approve the dissenting judgment of Lord Justice Denning in Candler v Crane, Christmas & Co [1951] 2 KB 164.

== Application ==
=== General rules and considerations ===
- Home Office v Dorset Yacht Co [1970] AC 1004, Lord Reid remarked,

In later years there has been a steady trend towards regarding the law of negligence as depending on principle so that, when a new point emerges, one should ask not whether it is covered by authority but whether recognised principles apply to it. Donoghue v Stevenson [1932] AC 562 may be regarded as a milestone, and the well-known passage in Lord Atkin's speech should I think be regarded as a statement of principle. It is not to be treated as if it were a statutory definition. It will require qualification in new circumstances. But I think that the time has come when we can and should say that it ought to apply unless there is some justification or valid explanation for its exclusion. For example, causing economic loss is a different matter: for one thing it is often caused by deliberate action. Competition involves traders being entitled to damage their rivals' interests by promoting their own, and there is a long chapter of the law determining in what circumstances owners of land can and in what circumstances they may not use their proprietary rights so as to injure their neighbours. But where negligence is involved the tendency has been to apply principles analogous to those stated by Lord Atkin ([as in] Hedley Byrne v. Heller [1964] A.C. 465).

=== Business to end-user consumer relations ===
- Smith v Eric S Bush [1990] 1 AC 831; The defendants were surveyors for a mortgagee. They performed a survey of the house, declaring it to need no significant repair. Relying on the survey, the house was conveyed to a purchaser. The chimney stack in the house fell down, and the purchaser sued for the negligent statement. It was held that even though the defendants had issued a liability waiver, it could not stand up to the Unfair Contract Terms Act 1977's test of reasonableness. More importantly, however, the court held that it was fair, just and reasonable for the purchaser of a modest house to rely on the surveyors' evaluation, as it was such common practice. Thus, the court extended Hedley Byrne liability to highly proximate third-party consumers.
- White v Jones [1995] 2 AC 207; In this case, which was carried by only a 3:2 majority in the highest court, a solicitor was told to draw up a new will, splitting the testator's estate between the two plaintiffs, his daughters. He negligently failed to do this by the time of the testator's death, and the estate passed in accordance with the testator's wishes expressed in a previous will. The daughters sued the solicitor in negligence. It was held that the solicitor had assumed a special relationship towards them, creating a duty of care which he had carried out negligently, and therefore had to indemnify them for their loss.

In such normal practices of reliance, in the consumer setting, the court extends Hedley Byrne liability and overrides many disclaimers.

=== Share agency liability (to shareholders) ===
- Henderson v Merrett Syndicates Ltd [1995] 2 AC 145; This case concerned the near collapse of Lloyd's of London when hurricanes in United States devastated its property holdings. It called upon its "Names" (the shareholders) to indemnify them for its losses. The Names sued the shareholding company for mismanagement and negligence. The Names had directly bought shares or, crucially, did so through a third-party agent. It was held that Merrett Syndicates was liable to both types of shareholders, as there was enough foreseeability to extend pure economic loss liability to "un-proximate" third parties. The major significance here was, however, the allowance of claims in both contract and tort, which blurred the divide between the two. Some of the first party Names claimed in tort to overcome the three-year limit in which an action must be taken in contract. In allowing such an action, the House of Lords expressly overruled Lord Scarman's ruling in Tai Hing Cotton Mill Ltd v Liu Chong Hing Bank Ltd [1986], in which it was held that: "there is nothing advantageous to the law's development in searching for a liability in tort where the parties are in a contractual relationship." The allowance of concurrent actions was immensely controversial, as it ran contrary to legal orthodoxy.

=== Usual company auditor to takeover bidder relations (no liability) ===
- Caparo Industries plc v Dickman [1990] 2 AC 605. An auditor (Dickman) negligently approved an overstated account of a company's profitability. A takeover bidder (Caparo) relied on these statements and pursued its takeover on the basis that the company's finances were sound. Once it had spent its money acquiring the company's shares, and company control, it found that the finances were in poorer shape than it had been led to believe. Caparo sued the auditor for negligence. The House of Lords however held that there was no duty of care between an auditor and a third party pursuing a takeover bid. The auditor had done the audit for the company, not the bidder. The bidder could have paid for and done its own audit. Thus there was neither a relationship of "proximity" nor was it "fair, just and reasonable" to make the auditor liable for the lost sums of money that the takeover incurred.

== See also ==
- Negligence
- Misrepresentation
- English tort law

== Bibliography ==
- Elliott, Catherine; Quinn, Frances (2007). Tort Law. Longman. ISBN 978-1-4058-4672-1.
