= Balfour =

Balfour may refer to:

== People ==
- Balfour (surname), a Scottish family name
- Balfour (given name), a list of people with the name

== Places ==
=== Canada ===
- Balfour, British Columbia, an unincorporated community
- Balfour, one of the townships that merged to form Rayside-Balfour, Ontario, a town
- Mount Balfour, on the border between British Columbia and Alberta

=== New Zealand ===
- Balfour, New Zealand, a town
- Balfour River

=== Scotland ===
- Balfour, Aberdeenshire, a settlement
- Balfour, Orkney, a village

=== South Africa ===
- Balfour, Eastern Cape, a town
- Balfour, Mpumalanga, a town

=== United States ===
- Balfour, Iowa, an unincorporated community
- Balfour, North Dakota, a city
- Balfour, North Carolina, an unincorporated community and census-designated place

=== Elsewhere ===
- Balfour Town, Salt Cay, the capital of Salt Cay, Turks Islands
- Mount Balfour (Antarctica)

== Buildings ==
- Beit Aghion, the residence of the Israeli prime minister, colloquially named "Balfour" after one of the streets that runs alongside it
- Castle Balfour, Lisnaskea, County Fermanagh, Northern Ireland
- Balfour Castle, Orkney, Scotland
- Balfour Castle, Angus, Scotland
- Balfour Building, Toronto, Ontario, Canada

== Companies ==
- Balfour Beatty, a British construction company
- Balfour Williamson, a former shipping company based in Liverpool, England, later an export confirming house and freight forwarding company
- L.G. Balfour Company, an American company specializing in school memorabilia

== Schools ==
- Balfour Collegiate, a public high school in Regina, Saskatchewan, Canada
- Sir Graham Balfour School, a coeducational secondary school and sixth form in Stafford, England
- Gymnasia Balfour, the former name of Ironi Alef High School in Tel Aviv, Israel

== Titles ==
- Earl of Balfour, a title in the Peerage of the United Kingdom
- Lord Balfour of Burleigh, a title in the Peerage of Scotland
- Baron Balfour of Glenawley, an extinct title in the Peerage of Ireland
- Baron Balfour of Inchrye, an extinct title in the Peerage of the United Kingdom
- Balfour baronets, three titles, one (extinct) in the Baronetage of Nova Scotia and two (one extant) in the Baronetage of the United Kingdom

== Other uses ==
- HMS Balfour, a Second World War II Royal Navy frigate
- MV Balfour, a Canadian ferry
- Balfour v Attorney-General, a 1919 New Zealand tort law case
- Balfour v. Balfour, a 1919 case in English contract law
- Balfour Biological Laboratory for Women, a laboratory attached to the University of Cambridge from 1884 to 1914
- Balfour Hospital, a rural general hospital in Kirkwall, Orkney, Scotland

== See also ==
- Balfour Declaration (disambiguation)
- Balfour Formation, a geological formation in South Africa
- Balfour House, an antebellum mansion in Vicksburg, Mississippi, United States
- SS Empire Balfour, a British refrigerated cargo ship built during the Second World War
- Balfour Strad, a fake Stradivarius violin
- Balfours, an Australian bakery
