= Negligence =

Failure to exercise reasonable care

Negligence (Latin: negligentia) is a failure to exercise appropriate care expected to be exercised in similar circumstances.

Within the scope of tort law, negligence pertains to harm caused by the violation of a duty of care through a negligent act or failure to act. The concept of negligence is linked to the obligation of individuals to exercise reasonable care in their actions and to consider foreseeable harm that their conduct might cause to other people or property. The elements of a negligence claim include the duty to act or refrain from action, breach of that duty, actual and proximate cause of harm, and damages. Someone who suffers loss caused by another's negligence may be able to sue for damages to compensate for their harm. Such loss may include physical injury, harm to property, psychiatric illness, or economic loss.

== Elements of negligence claims ==
To successfully pursue a claim of negligence through a lawsuit, a plaintiff must establish the "elements" of negligence. In most jurisdictions there are four elements to a negligence action:

1. duty: the defendant has a duty to others, including the plaintiff, to exercise reasonable care,
2. breach: the defendant breaches that duty through an act or culpable omission,
3. damages: as a result of that act or omission, the plaintiff suffers an injury, and
4. causation: the injury to the plaintiff is a reasonably foreseeable consequence of the defendant's act or omission.

Some jurisdictions narrow the definition down to three elements: duty, breach and proximately caused harm. Some jurisdictions recognize five elements, duty, breach, actual cause, proximate cause, and damages. Despite these differences, definitions of what constitutes negligent conduct remain similar.

=== Duty of care ===
The legal liability of a defendant to a plaintiff is based on the defendant's failure to fulfil a responsibility, recognised by law, of which the plaintiff is the intended beneficiary. The first step in determining the existence of a legally recognised responsibility is the concept of an obligation or duty. In the tort of negligence, the term used is duty of care.

The case of Donoghue v Stevenson (1932) established the modern law of negligence, laying the foundations of the duty of care and the fault principle which, (through the Privy Council), have been adopted throughout the Commonwealth. May Donoghue and her friend were in a café in Paisley. The friend bought Donoghue a ginger beer float. She drank some of the beer and later poured the remainder over her ice-cream and was horrified to see the decomposed remains of a snail exit the bottle. Donoghue suffered nervous shock and gastro-enteritis, but did not sue the cafe owner, instead suing the manufacturer, Stevenson. (As Donoghue had not herself bought the beer, the doctrine of privity precluded a contractual action against Stevenson.)

The Scottish judge, Lord MacMillan, considered the case to fall within a new category of delict (the Scots law nearest equivalent of tort). The case proceeded to the House of Lords, where Lord Atkin interpreted the biblical ordinance to "love thy neighbour" as a legal requirement to "not harm thy neighbour". He then went on to define neighbour as "persons who are so closely and directly affected by my act that I ought reasonably to have them in contemplation as being so affected when I am directing my mind to the acts or omissions that are called in question."

In England the case of Caparo Industries Plc v Dickman (1990) introduced a "threefold test" for a duty of care. Harm must be (1) reasonably foreseeable (2) there must be a relationship of proximity between the plaintiff and defendant and (3) it must be "fair, just, and reasonable" to impose liability. However, these act as guidelines for the courts in establishing a duty of care; much of the principle is still at the discretion of judges.

In Australia, Donoghue v Stevenson was used as a persuasive precedent in the case of Grant v Australian Knitting Mills (AKR) (1936). This was a landmark case in the development of the negligence law in Australia.

Whether a duty of care is owed for psychiatric, as opposed to physical, harm was discussed in the Australian case of Tame v State of New South Wales; Annetts v Australian Stations Pty Ltd (2002). Determining a duty for mental harm has now been subsumed into the Civil Liability Act 2002 in New South Wales. The application of Part 3 of the Civil Liability Act 2002 (NSW) was demonstrated in Wicks v SRA (NSW); Sheehan v SRA (NSW).

=== Breach of duty ===
Once it is established that the defendant owed a duty to the plaintiff/claimant, the matter of whether or not that duty was breached must be settled. The test is both subjective and objective. The defendant who knowingly (subjective, which is based on observation and personal prejudice or view) exposes the plaintiff/claimant to a substantial risk of loss, breaches that duty. The defendant who fails to realize the substantial risk of loss to the plaintiff/claimant, which any "reasonable person"(objective, which is totally based on ground facts without any personal prejudice or point of view) in the same situation would have realized, also breaches that duty. However, whether the test is objective or subjective may depend upon the particular case involved.

There is a reduced threshold for the standard of care owed by children. In the Australian case of McHale v Watson, McHale, a 9-year-old girl was blinded in one eye after being hit by the ricochet of a sharp metal rod thrown by a 12-year-old boy, Watson. The defendant child was held not to have the level of care to the standard of an adult, but of a 12-year-old child with similar experience and intelligence. Kitto J explained that a child's lack of foresight is a characteristic they share with others at that stage of development. The same principle was demonstrated to exist in English law in Mullin v Richards.

Certain jurisdictions, also provide for breaches where professionals, such as doctors, fail to warn of risks associated with medical treatments or procedures, such as an obstetrician did not warn a mother of complications arising. In Montgomery v Lanarkshire Health Board, the UK Supreme Court (hearing a Scottish delict case) decided that doctors are under a duty to ensure patients are aware of material risks in the treatment they recommend, and to make them aware (if possible) of any other reasonable treatment option—a form of informed consent. Under Queensland's Civil Liability Act, doctors owe both objective and subjective duties to warn—breach of either is sufficient to satisfy this element in a court of law.

In Donoghue v Stevenson, Lord Macmillan declared that "the categories of negligence are never closed"; and in Dorset Yacht v Home Office it was held that the government had no immunity from suit when they negligently failed to prevent the escape of juvenile offenders who subsequently vandalise a boatyard. In other words, all members of society have a duty to exercise reasonable care toward others and their property. In Bolton v. Stone (1951), the House of Lords held that a defendant was not negligent if the damage to the plaintiff were not a reasonably foreseeable consequence of his conduct. In the case, a Miss Stone was struck on the head by a cricket ball while standing outside a cricket ground. Finding that no batsman would normally be able hit a cricket ball far enough to reach a person standing as far away as was Miss Stone, the court held her claim would fail because the danger was not reasonably or sufficiently foreseeable. As stated in the opinion, "reasonable risk" cannot be judged with the benefit of hindsight. In Roe v Minister of Health, Lord Denning said the past should not be viewed through rose coloured spectacles, finding no negligence on the part of medical professionals accused of using contaminated medical jars, since contemporary standards would have indicated only a low possibility of medical jar contamination.

- United States v. Carroll Towing Co. 159 F.2d 169 (2d. Cir. 1947)

For the rule in the U.S., see Calculus of negligence

==== Intention and/or malice ====
Further establishment of conditions of intention or malice where applicable may apply in cases of gross negligence.

=== Causation ===
In order for liability to result from a negligent act or omission, it is necessary to prove not only that the injury was caused by that negligence, but also that there is a legally sufficient connection between the act and the negligence.

==== Factual causation (actual cause) ====
For a defendant to be held liable, it must be shown that the particular acts or omissions were the cause of the loss or damage sustained. Although the notion sounds simple, the causation between one's breach of duty and the harm that results to another can at times be very complicated. The basic test is to ask whether the injury would have occurred "but for", or without, the accused party's breach of the duty owed to the injured party. In Australia, the High Court has held that the "but for" test is not the exclusive test of causation because it cannot address a situation where there is more than one cause of damage. When "but for" test is not satisfied and the case is an exceptional one, a commonsense test ("Whether and Why" test) will be applied Even more precisely, if a breaching party materially increases the risk of harm to another, then the breaching party can be sued to the value of harm that he caused.

Asbestos litigations which have been ongoing for decades revolve around the issue of causation. Interwoven with the simple idea of a party causing harm to another are issues on insurance bills and compensations, which sometimes drove compensating companies out of business.

==== Legal causation (proximate cause) ====
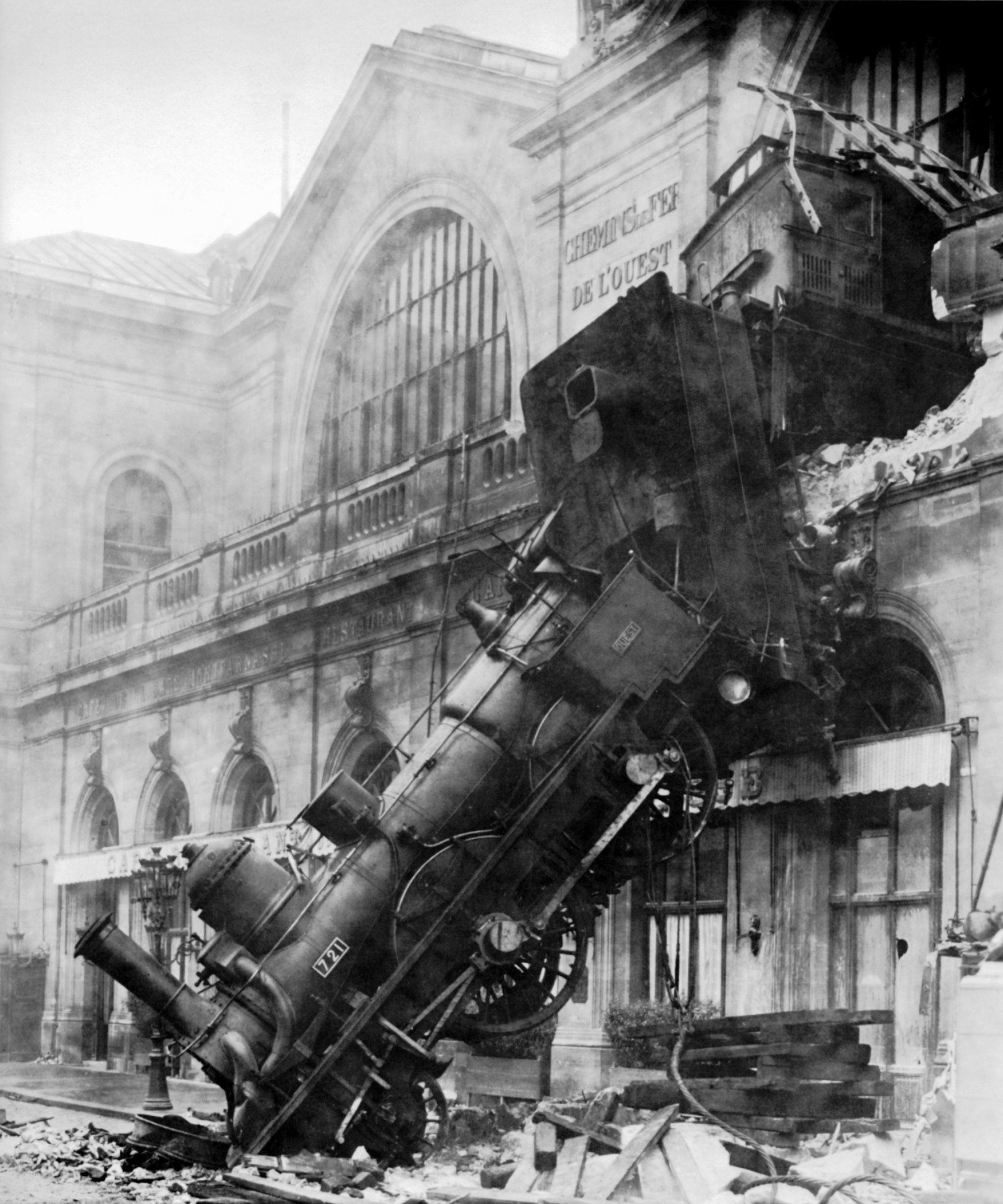
Negligence can lead to collisions like the Montparnasse derailment at Gare Montparnasse in 1895.

Sometimes factual causation is distinguished from "legal causation" to avert the danger of defendants being exposed to, in the words of Cardozo, J., "liability in an indeterminate amount for an indeterminate time to an indeterminate class". It is said a new question arises of how remote a consequence a person's harm is from another's negligence. We say that one's negligence is "too remote" (in England) or not a "proximate cause" (in the US) of another's harm if one would "never reasonably foresee it happening". A "proximate cause" in US terminology (to do with the chain of events between the action and the injury) should not be confused with the "proximity test" under the English duty of care (to do with closeness of relationship). The idea of legal causation is that if no one can foresee an incident, and therefore can not take care to avoid it, nobody could be responsible. For instance, in Palsgraf v. Long Island Rail Road Co., the judge decided that the defendant, a railway, was not liable for an injury suffered by a distant bystander. The plaintiff, Palsgraf, was hit by coin-operated scale which toppled because of fireworks explosion that fell on her as she waited on a train platform. The scales fell because of a far-away commotion (a train conductor had pushed a passenger holding a box containing an explosive) but it was not clear that what type of commotion caused the scale to fall, either it was the explosion's effect or the confused movement of the terrified people. A train conductor had run to help a man into a departing train. The man was carrying a package as he jogged to jump in the train door. The package had fireworks in it. The conductor mishandled the passenger, or his package, causing it to fall. The fireworks slipped and exploded on the ground causing shockwaves to travel through the platform, which became the cause of commotion on the platform, and as a consequence, the scales fell. (Note: The plaintiff's physical injuries were minor and more likely caused by a stampede of travelers on the platform rather than the concussion of the exploding fireworks. These details have not, however, stopped the case from becoming the source of extensive debate in American tort law.) Because Palsgraf was hurt by the falling scales, she sued the train company who employed the conductor for negligence. (Note: She could have sued the man or the conductor himself, but they did not have as much money as the company. Often, in litigation, where two defendants are equally liable but one is more able to satisfy a judgment, he will be the preferred defendant and is referred to as the "deep pocket.")

The defendant train company argued it should not be liable as a matter of law, because despite the fact that they employed the employee, who was negligent, his negligence was too remote from the plaintiff's injury. On appeal, the majority of the court agreed, with four judges adopting the reasons, written by Judge Cardozo, that the defendant owed no duty of care to the plaintiff, because a duty was owed only to foreseeable plaintiffs. Three judges dissented, arguing, as written by Judge Andrews, that the defendant owed a duty to the plaintiff, regardless of foreseeability, because all men owe one another a duty not to act negligently.

Such disparity of views on the element of remoteness continues to trouble the judiciary. Courts that follow Cardozo's view have greater control in negligence cases. If the court can find that, as a matter of law, the defendant owed no duty of care to the plaintiff, the plaintiff will lose his case for negligence before having a chance to present to the jury. Cardozo's view is the majority view. However, some courts follow the position put forth by Judge Andrews. In jurisdictions following the minority rule, defendants must phrase their remoteness arguments in terms of proximate cause if they wish the court to take the case away from the jury.

Remoteness takes another form, seen in The Wagon Mound (No. 2). The Wagon Mound was a ship in Sydney harbour. The ship leaked oil creating a slick in part of the harbour. The wharf owner asked the ship owner about the danger and was told he could continue his work because the slick would not burn. The wharf owner allowed work to continue on the wharf, which sent sparks onto a rag in the water which ignited and created a fire which burnt down the wharf. The Privy Council determined that the wharf owner "intervened" in the causal chain, creating a responsibility for the fire which canceled out the liability of the ship owner.

In Australia the concept of remoteness, or proximity, was tested with the case of Jaensch v Coffey. The wife of a policeman, Vicki Coffey, suffered a nervous shock injury from the aftermath of a motor vehicle collision, although she was not actually at the scene at the time of the collision. The court upheld that, in addition to it being reasonably foreseeable that his wife might suffer such an injury, it required that there be sufficient proximity between the plaintiff and the defendant who caused the collision. Here there was sufficient causal proximity. See also Kavanagh v Akhtar, Imbree v McNeilly, and Tame v NSW.

=== Injury ===
Even though there is breach of duty, and the cause of some injury to the defendant, a plaintiff may not recover unless he can prove that the defendant's breach caused a pecuniary injury.

As a general rule, plaintiffs in tort litigation can only recover damages if they prove both that they suffered a loss and that the loss was reasonably foreseeable to the defendant. When damages are not a necessary element of a tort claim, a plaintiff may prevail without demonstrating a financial injury, potentially recovering nominal damages along with any other remedy available under the law.

Negligence is different in that the plaintiff must ordinarily prove a pecuniary loss in order to recover damages. In some cases, such as defamation per se, damages may be presumed. Recovery for non-pecuniary losses, such as emotional injury, are normally recoverable only if the plaintiff has also proved a pecuniary loss. Examples of pecuniary loss include medical bills that result from an injury, or repair costs or loss of income due to property damage.

The damage may be physical, purely economic, both physical and economic (loss of earnings following a personal injury), or reputational (in a defamation case).

In English law, the right to claim for purely economic loss is limited to a number of "special" and "clearly defined circumstances", often related to the nature of the duty to the plaintiff as between clients and lawyers, financial advisers, and other professions where money is central to the consultative services.

Emotional distress has been recognized as an actionable tort. Generally, emotional distress damages had to be parasitic. That is, the plaintiff could recover for emotional distress caused by injury, but only if it accompanied a physical or pecuniary injury.

A claimant who has suffered only emotional distress and no pecuniary loss would not recover for negligence. However, courts have recently allowed recovery for a plaintiff to recover for purely emotional distress under certain circumstances. The state courts of California allowed recovery for emotional distress alone – even in the absence of any physical injury, when the defendant physically injures a relative of the plaintiff, and the plaintiff witnesses it.

The eggshell skull rule is a legal doctrine upheld in some tort law systems, which holds that a tortfeasor is liable for the full extent of damage caused, even where the extent of the damage is due to the unforeseen frailty of the claimant. The eggshell skull rule was recently maintained in Australia in the case of Kavanagh v Akhtar.

=== Special doctrines ===
Res ipsa loquitur: Latin for "the thing speaks for itself". To prove negligence under this doctrine the plaintiff must prove (1) the incident does not usually happen without negligence, (2) the object that caused the harm was under the defendant's control and (3) the plaintiff did not contribute to the cause.

Negligence per se comes down to whether or not a party violated a standard in law meant to protect the public such as a building code or speed limit.

== Damages ==
Damages place a monetary value on the harm done, following the principle of restitutio in integrum (Latin for "restoration to the original condition"). Thus, for most purposes connected with the quantification of damages, the degree of culpability in the breach of the duty of care is irrelevant. Once the breach of the duty is established, the only requirement is to compensate the victim.

One of the main tests that is posed when deliberating whether a claimant is entitled to compensation for a tort, is the "reasonable person". The test is self-explanatory: would a reasonable person (as determined by a judge or jury), under the given circumstances, have done what the defendant did to cause the injury in question; or, in other words, would a reasonable person, acting reasonably, have engaged in similar conduct when compared to the one whose actions caused the injury in question? Simple as the "reasonable person" test sounds, it is very complicated. It is a risky test because it involves the opinion of either the judge or the jury that can be based on limited facts. However, as vague as the "reasonable person" test seems, it is extremely important in deciding whether or not a plaintiff is entitled to compensation for a negligence tort.

Damages are compensatory in nature. Compensatory damages addresses a plaintiff/claimant's losses (in cases involving physical or mental injury the amount awarded also compensates for pain and suffering). The award should make the plaintiff whole, sufficient to put the plaintiff back in the position he or she was before Defendant's negligent act. Anything more would unlawfully permit a plaintiff to profit from the tort.

There are also two other general principles relating to damages. Firstly, the award of damages should take place in the form of a single lump sum payment. Therefore, a defendant should not be required to make periodic payments (however some statutes give exceptions for this). Secondly, the court is not concerned with how the plaintiff uses the award of damages. For example, if a plaintiff is awarded $100,000 for physical harm, the plaintiff is not required to spend this money on medical bills to restore them to their original position – they can spend this money any way they want.

Types of damage

- Special damages – quantifiable dollar losses suffered from the date of defendant's negligent act (the tort) up to a specified time (proven at trial). Special damage examples include lost wages, medical bills, and damage to property such as one's car.
- General damages – these are damages that are not quantified in monetary terms (e.g., there's no invoice or receipt as there would be to prove special damages). A general damage example is an amount for the pain and suffering one experiences from a car collision. Lastly, where the plaintiff proves only minimal loss or damage, or the court or jury is unable to quantify the losses, the court or jury may award nominal damages.
- Punitive damages – Punitive damages are to punish a defendant, rather than to compensate plaintiffs, in negligence cases. In most jurisdictions punitive damages are recoverable in a negligence action, but only if the plaintiff shows that the defendant's conduct was more than ordinary negligence (i.e., wanton and willful or reckless).
- Aggravated damages – In contrast to exemplary damages, compensation are given to the plaintiff when the harm is aggravated by the defendant's conduct. For example, the manner of this wrongful act increased the injury by subjecting the plaintiff to humiliation, insult.

== Comparison by jurisdiction ==
=== Civil law jurisdictions ===
In the Swiss Criminal Code, the term "négligence" is used to denote an omission, akin to the English term "negligence". However, unlike criminal negligence, it describes situations where the perpetrator acts without being aware of the potential consequences of their actions or disregards these consequences.

Similarly, under the Turkish Penal Code No. 5237, which took effect on June 1, 2005, "criminal negligence" (Turkish: İhmali suç) refers to a person's failure to act when required by law, while "negligence" (Turkish: Taksir) is defined as the occurrence of a legally foreseen consequence due to a lack of necessary care.

The French criminal code, as a rule, requires a person to have acted with mens rea, for an act to be punishable. Comparably, the Italian Penal Code [it], enacted on October 19, 1930, specifies in Article 42 that a person can only be punished for a crime if it was committed with intent. However, Article 43 provides exceptions for crimes arising from negligence or exceeding intentionality. These negligent crimes occur despite the defendant's foresight (Note: Refers to the situation of "conscious negligence" where the perpetrator performs the act with the confidence that the anticipated outcome will not occur, as opposed to intentional conduct.) and are the result of negligence, carelessness, lack of experience, or non-compliance with laws, regulations, orders, or disciplinary rules.

Consistent with other civil law systems, Turkish criminal law also treats criminal responsibility for acts committed negligently as an exception, confined to those acts explicitly stated in the law. Article 23 of the Turkish Penal Code further asserts that for crimes that are aggravated by their consequences to be attributed to the perpetrator, the base crime must be committed with intent. Furthermore, concerning the aggravated or unintended consequences, the perpetrator must have acted with at least a minimal level of negligence, whether advertently or inadvertently.

=== Common law jurisdictions ===
==== England and Wales ====
Claims for negligence in England and Wales are subject to the time scale provisions of the Limitation Act 1980. However, the Latent Damage Act 1986 amended the law in relation to "actions for damages for negligence not involving personal injuries" when evidence that work has been completed negligently does not become available until some time after the work has been completed, i.e. "latent damage".

==== India ====
With regard to negligence, Indian jurisprudence follows the approach stated in Ratanlal & Dhirajlal: The Law of Torts, laying down three elements:

- A duty of care (i.e. a legal duty to exercise "ordinary care and skill")
- A violation of the appropriate standard of care (Note: In other words, the breach of the duty caused by the omission to do something which a reasonable person, guided by those considerations which ordinarily regulate the conduct of human affairs would do, or doing something which a reasonable person would not do.)
- Causation (i.e. the violation resulted in injury to the plaintiff's person or property)

The Indian approach to professional negligence requires that any skilled task requires a skilled professional. Such a professional would be expected to be exercising his skill with reasonable competence. Professionals may be held liable for negligence on one of two findings:

- They were not possessed of the requisite skill which he professed to have possessed.
- They did not exercise, with reasonable competence in the given case, the skill which he did possess. The standard to be applied for determining whether or not either of the two findings can be made is whether a competent person exercising ordinary skill in that profession would possess or exercise in a similar manner the skill in question. Consequently, it is not necessary for every professional to possess the highest level of expertise in that branch which he practices. Professional opinion is generally accepted, but courts may rule otherwise if they feel that the opinion is "not reasonable or responsible".

==== New Zealand ====
- Balfour v Attorney-General [1991] 1 NZLR 519 (the court differentiated between defamation and negligence)
- Clearlite Holdings Ltd v Auckland City Corp [1976] 2 NZLR 729, Paxhaven Holdings LId. v. Attorney-General [1974] 2 N.Z.L.R. 185 (both on the interrelation of negligence and nuisance)
- Mainguard Packaging Ltd v Hilton Haulage Ltd [1990] 1 NZLR 360
- Cases regarding negligence in building construction: Bowen v Paramount Builders (Hamilton) Ltd [1977] 1 NZLR 394; Scott Group Ltd v McFarlane [1978] 1 NZLR 553; Mount Albert Borough Council v Johnson [1979] 2 NZLR 234; Brown v Heathcote County Council [1986] 1 NZLR 76; South Pacific Manufacturing Co Ltd v New Zealand Security Consultants & Investigations Ltd [1992] 2 NZLR 282; Invercargill City Council v Hamlin [1994] 3 NZLR 513; Te Mata Properties Ltd v Hastings District Council. [2009] 1 NZLR 460; Queenstown Lakes DC V Charterhall Trustees Ltd [2009] NZSC 116;
  - leaky buildings: Dicks v Hobson Swan Construction Ltd (2006) HC; North Shore City Council v Body Corporate ("Sunset Terraces"); Spencer on Byron (2011) SC.

==== United States ====
In the United States, negligence is governed primarily by state law, although negligence claims may also arise under federal law. The elements of a negligence action may vary by jurisdiction, but generally require that the plaintiff prove four elements: duty, breach, proximate causation and injury. A plaintiff who makes a negligence claim must prove all four elements of negligence in order to win his or her case. Therefore, if it is highly unlikely that the plaintiff can prove one of the elements, the defendant may request judicial resolution early on, to prevent the case from going to a jury. This can be by way of a demurrer, motion to dismiss, or motion for summary judgment.

The elements allow a defendant to test a plaintiff's accusations before trial, as well as providing a guide to the finder of fact at trial (the judge in a bench trial, or jury in a jury trial) to decide whether the defendant is or is not liable. Whether the case is resolved with or without trial again depends heavily on the particular facts of the case, and the ability of the parties to frame the issues to the court. The duty and causation elements in particular give the court the greatest opportunity to take the case from the jury, because they directly involve questions of policy. The court can find that regardless of any disputed facts, the case may be resolved as a matter of law from undisputed facts because as a matter of law the defendant cannot be legally responsible for the plaintiff's injury under a theory of negligence.

On appeal, depending on the disposition of the case and the question on appeal, the court reviewing a trial court's determination that the defendant was negligent will analyze at least one of the elements of the cause of action to determine if it is properly supported by the facts and law. For example, in an appeal from a final judgment after a jury verdict, the appellate court will review the record to verify that the jury was properly instructed on each contested element, and that the record shows sufficient evidence for the jury's findings. On an appeal from a dismissal or judgment against the plaintiff without trial, the court will review de novo whether the court below properly found that the plaintiff could not prove any or all of his or her case.

== See also ==
- Carelessness
- Criminal negligence
- Gross negligence
- Intentionality
- Malpractice
- Medical negligence
- Mens rea
- Neglect
- Negligence in English Law
