= Caparo Industries plc v Dickman =

Leading English tort law case

Caparo Industries PLC v Dickman
- Court: House of Lords
- Decided: 8 February 1990
- Citation: [1990] ALL ER 568, [1990] 2 AC 605

Court membership
- Judges sitting: Lord Bridge of Harwich; Lord Roskill; Lord Ackner; Lord Oliver of Aylmerton; Lord Jauncey of Tullichettle

Case opinions
- Decision by: Lord Bridge
- Concurrence: Lord Roskill, Lord Ackner, Lord Oliver and Lord Jauncey

Keywords
- negligence; three-fold test; negligent misstatement

Caparo Industries PLC v Dickman [1990] UKHL 2 is a leading English tort law case on the test for a duty of care. The House of Lords set out a "three-fold test" that for a duty of care in negligence:

- harm must be reasonably foreseeable as a potential result of the defendant's conduct (as established in Donoghue v Stevenson),
- the parties must be in a relationship of proximity, and
- it must be fair, just and reasonable to impose liability.

The case held that an accountant, who carelessly said a company's profits were healthier than they were, owed no duty of care to a takeover bidder. Previous cases on negligent misstatements had fallen under the principle of Hedley Byrne v Heller. This stated that when a person makes a statement, he voluntarily assumes responsibility to the person he makes it to (or those who were in his contemplation). If the statement was made negligently, then he will be liable for any loss which results. The question in Caparo was the scope of the assumption of responsibility, and what the limits of liability ought to be.

Since Caparo, the UK Supreme Court clarified in Robinson v Chief Constable of West Yorkshire Police that the three-fold test is not to be applied in every case, but may only be a useful guide where the situation is novel.

== Facts ==
A company called Fidelity plc, manufacturers of electrical equipment, was the target of a takeover by Caparo Industries plc. In March 1984 Fidelity had issued a profit warning, which had halved its share price. In May 1984 Fidelity's directors announced poor profits for the year up to March. The share price fell again. Caparo had begun buying up shares in large numbers. In June 1984 the annual accounts, which were done with the help of the accountant Dickman, were issued to the shareholders, which now included Caparo. Caparo reached a shareholding of 29.9% of the company. It made a general offer for the remaining shares, as the City Code's rules on takeovers required. Once it had control, Caparo found that Fidelity's accounts were in an even worse state than had been revealed by the directors or the auditors. It sued Dickman for negligence in preparing the accounts and sought to recover its losses. This was the difference in value between the company as it had and what it would have had if the accounts had been accurate.

== Judgment ==
=== Court of Appeal ===
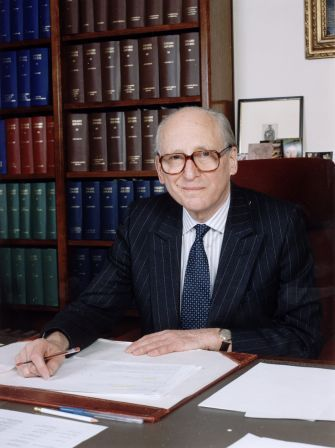
Lord Bingham of Cornhill

The majority of the Court of Appeal (Bingham LJ and Taylor LJ; O'Connor LJ dissenting) held that a duty was owed by the auditor to shareholders individually, and although it was not necessary to decide that in this case and the judgment was obiter, that a duty would not be owed to an outside investor who had no shareholding. Bingham LJ held that, for a duty owed to shareholders directly, the very purpose of publishing accounts was to inform investors so that they could make choices within a company about how to use their shares. But for outside investors, a relationship of proximity would be "tenuous" at best, and that it would certainly not be "fair, just and reasonable". O'Connor LJ, in dissent, would have held that no duty was owed at all to either group. He used the example of a shareholder and his friend both looking at an account report. He thought that if both went and invested, the friend who had no previous shareholding would certainly not have a sufficiently proximate relationship to the negligent auditor. So it would not be sensible or fair to say that the shareholder did either. Leave was given to appeal.

The "three stage" test, adopted from Sir Neil Lawson in the High Court, was elaborated by Bingham LJ (subsequently the Senior Law Lord) in his judgment at the Court of Appeal. In it he extrapolated from previously confusing cases what he thought were three main principles to be applied across the law of negligence for the duty of care:

"It is not easy, or perhaps possible, to find a single proposition encapsulating a comprehensive rule to determine when persons are brought into a relationship which creates a duty of care upon those who make statements towards those who may act upon them and when persons are not brought into such a relationship."

Thus the Lord Ordinary, Lord Stewart, in Twomax Ltd v Dickson, McFarlane & Robinson 1983 SLT 98, 103. Others have spoken to similar effect. In Hedley Byrne & Co Ltd v Heller & Partners Ltd [1964] AC 465 Lord Hodson said, at p. 514: "I do not think it is possible to catalogue the special features which must be found to exist before the duty of care will arise in a given case," and Lord Devlin said, at pp. 529-530:

"I do not think it possible to formulate with exactitude all the conditions under which the law will in a specific case imply a voluntary undertaking any more than it is possible to formulate those in which the law will imply a contract."

In Mutual Life and Citizens' Assurance Co Ltd v Evatt [1971] AC 793 Lord Reid and Lord Morris of Borth-y-Gest said, at p. 810: "In our judgment it is not possible to lay down hard-and-fast rules as to when a duty of care arises in this or in any other class of case where negligence is alleged." In Rowling v Takaro Properties Ltd [1988] AC 473, 501, Lord Keith of Kinkel emphasised the need for careful analysis case by case:

"It is at this stage that it is necessary, before concluding that a duty of care should be imposed, to consider all the relevant circumstances. One of the considerations underlying certain recent decisions of the House of Lords (Governors of the Peabody Donation Fund v Sir Lindsay Parkinson & Co Ltd [1985] A.C. 210 ) and of the Privy Council (Yuen Kun Yeu v Attorney-General of Hong Kong [1988] A.C. 175 ) is the fear that a too literal application of the well-known observation of Lord Wilberforce in Anns v Merton London Borough Council [1978] AC 728, 751-752, may be productive of a failure to have regard to, and to analyse and weigh, all the relevant considerations in considering whether it is appropriate that a duty of care should be imposed. Their Lordships consider that question to be of an intensely pragmatic character, well suited for gradual development but requiring most careful analysis. It is one upon which all common law jurisdictions can learn much from each other; because, apart from exceptional cases, no sensible distinction can be drawn in this respect between the various countries and the social conditions existing in them. It is incumbent upon the courts in different jurisdictions to be sensitive to each other's reactions; but what they are all searching for in others, and each of them striving to achieve, is a careful analysis and weighing of the relevant competing considerations."

The many decided cases on this subject, if providing no simple ready-made solution to the question whether or not a duty of care exists, do indicate the requirements to be satisfied before a duty is found.

The first is foreseeability. It is not, and could not be, in issue between these parties that reasonable foreseeability of harm is a necessary ingredient of a relationship in which a duty of care will arise: Yuen Kun Yeu v Attorney-General of Hong Kong [1988] A.C. 175, 192A. It is also common ground that reasonable foreseeability, although a necessary, is not a sufficient condition of the existence of a duty. This, as Lord Keith of Kinkel observed in Hill v Chief Constable of West Yorkshire [1989] A.C. 53, 60B, has been said almost too frequently to require repetition.

The second requirement is more elusive. It is usually described as proximity, which means not simple physical proximity but extends to

"such close and direct relations that the act complained of directly affects a person whom the person alleged to be bound to take care would know would be directly affected by his careless act:" Donoghue v Stevenson [1932] A.C. 562, 581, per Lord Atkin.

Sometimes the alternative expression "neighbourhood" is used, as by Lord Reid in the Hedley Byrne case [1964] A.C. 465, 483 and Lord Wilberforce in Anns v Merton London Borough Council [1978] A.C. 728, 751H, with more conscious reference to Lord Atkin's speech in the earlier case. Sometimes, as in the Hedley Byrne case, attention is concentrated on the existence of a special relationship. Sometimes it is regarded as significant that the parties' relationship is "equivalent to contract" (see the Hedley Byrne case, at p. 529, per Lord Devlin), or falls "only just short of a direct contractual relationship" (Junior Books Ltd v Veitchi Co Ltd [1983] 1 A.C. 520, 533B, per Lord Fraser of Tullybelton), or is "as close as it could be short of actual privity of contract:" see p. 546C, per Lord Roskill. In some cases, and increasingly, reference is made to the voluntary assumption of responsibility: Muirhead v Industrial Tank Specialities Ltd [1986] Q.B. 507, 528A, per Robert Goff L.J.; Yuen Kun Yeu v Attorney-General of Hong Kong [1988] A.C. 175, 192F, 196G; Simaan General Contracting v Pilkington Glass Ltd. (No. 2) [1988] Q.B. 758, 781F, 784G; Greater Nottingham Co-operative Society Ltd v Cementation Piling and Foundations Ltd. [1989] Q.B. 71, 99, 106, 108. Both the analogy with contract and the assumption of responsibility have been relied upon as a test of proximity in foreign courts as well as our own: see, for example, Glanzer v Shepard (1922) 135 NE 275, 276; Ultramares Corporation v Touche (1931) 174 N.E. 441, 446; State Street Trust Co v Ernst (1938) 15 N.E. 2d 416, 418; Scott Group Ltd v McFarlane [1978] 1 NZLR 553, 567. It may very well be that in tortious claims based on negligent misstatement these notions are particularly apposite. The content of the requirement of proximity, whatever language is used, is not, I think, capable of precise definition. The approach will vary according to the particular facts of the case, as is reflected in the varied language used. But the focus of the inquiry is on the closeness and directness of the relationship between the parties. In determining this, foreseeability must, I think, play an important part: the more obvious it is that A's act or omission will cause harm to B, the less likely a court will be to hold that the relationship of A and B is insufficiently proximate to give rise to a duty of care.

The third requirement to be met before a duty of care will be held to be owed by A to B is that the court should find it just and reasonable to impose such a duty: Governors of the Peabody Donation Fund v Sir Lindsay Parkinson & Co Ltd [1985] A.C. 210, 241, per Lord Keith of Kinkel. This requirement, I think, covers very much the same ground as Lord Wilberforce's second stage test in Anns v Merton London Borough Council [1978] A.C. 728, 752A, and what in cases such as Spartan Steel & Alloys Ltd v Martin & Co. (Contractors) Ltd [1973] Q.B. 27 and McLoughlin v O'Brian [1983] 1 A.C. 410 was called policy. It was considerations of this kind which Lord Fraser of Tullybelton had in mind when he said that "some limit or control mechanism has to be imposed upon the liability of a wrongdoer towards those who have suffered economic damage in consequence of his negligence:" Candlewood Navigation Corporation Ltd v Mitsui OSK Lines Ltd [1986] AC 1, 25A. The requirement cannot, perhaps, be better put than it was by Weintraub C.J. in Goldberg v Housing Authority of the City of Newark (1962) 186 A. 2d 291, 293:

"Whether a duty exists is ultimately a question of fairness. The inquiry involves a weighing of the relationship of the parties, the nature of the risk, and the public interest in the proposed solution."

If the imposition of a duty on a defendant would be for any reason oppressive, or would expose him, in Cardozo C.J.'s famous phrase in Ultramares Corporation v Touche, 174 N.E. 441, 444, "to a liability in an indeterminate amount for an indeterminate time to an indeterminate class," that will weigh heavily, probably conclusively, against the imposition of a duty (if it has not already shown a fatal lack of proximity). On the other hand, a duty will be the more readily found if the defendant is voluntarily exercising a professional skill for reward, if the victim of his carelessness has (in the absence of a duty) no means of redress, if the duty contended for, as in McLoughlin v O'Brian [1983] 1 A.C. 410, arises naturally from a duty which already exists or if the imposition of a duty is thought to promote some socially desirable objective.

=== House of Lords ===
Lord Bridge of Harwich who delivered the leading judgment restated the so-called "Caparo test" which Bingham LJ had formulated, but decided, following O'Connor LJ's dissent in the Court of Appeal, that no duty was owed at all, either to existing shareholders or to future investors by a negligent auditor. The purpose of the statutory requirement for an audit of public companies under the Companies Act 1985 was the making of a report to enable shareholders to exercise their class rights in general meeting. It did not extend to the provision of information to assist shareholders in the making of decisions as to future investment in the company. He said that the principles have developed since Anns v Merton London Borough Council. Indeed, even Lord Wilberforce had subsequently recognised that foreseeability alone was not a sufficient test of proximity. It is necessary to consider the particular circumstances and relationships which exist.

Lord Bridge then proceeded to analyse the particular facts of the case based upon principles of proximity and relationship. He referred approvingly to the dissenting judgment of Lord Justice Denning (as he then was) in Candler v Crane, Christmas & Co [1951] 2 KB 164 where Denning LJ held that the relationship must be one where the accountant or auditor preparing the accounts was aware of the particular person and purpose for which the accounts being prepared would be used. There could not be a duty owed in respect of "liability in an indeterminate amount for an indeterminate time to an indeterminate class" (Ultramares Corp v Touche, per Cardozo C.J New York Court of Appeals). Applying those principles, the defendants owed no duty of care to potential investors in the company who might acquire shares in the company on the basis of the audited accounts.

Lord Bridge concluded by answering the specific question of whether auditors should be liable to individual shareholders in tort, beyond a claim brought by a company. He referred to the Companies Act 1985 sections on auditors, and continued.

No doubt these provisions establish a relationship between the auditors and the shareholders of a company on which the shareholder is entitled to rely for the protection of his interest. But the crucial question concerns the extent of the shareholder's interest which the auditor has a duty to protect. The shareholders of a company have a collective interest in the company's proper management and in so far as a negligent failure of the auditor to report accurately on the state of the company's finances deprives the shareholders of the opportunity to exercise their powers in general meeting to call the directors to book and to ensure that errors in management are corrected, the shareholders ought to be entitled to a remedy. But in practice no problem arises in this regard since the interest of the shareholders in the proper management of the company's affairs is indistinguishable from the interest of the company itself and any loss suffered by the shareholders, e.g. by the negligent failure of the auditor to discover and expose a misappropriation of funds by a director of the company, will be recouped by a claim against the auditors in the name of the company, not by individual shareholders.

I find it difficult to visualise a situation arising in the real world in which the individual shareholder could claim to have sustained a loss in respect of his existing shareholding referable to the negligence of the auditor which could not be recouped by the company. But on this part of the case your Lordships were much pressed with the argument that such a loss might occur by a negligent undervaluation of the company's assets in the auditor's report relied on by the individual shareholder in deciding to sell his shares at an undervalue. The argument then runs thus. The shareholder, qua shareholder, is entitled to rely on the auditor's report as the basis of his investment decision to sell his existing shareholding. If he sells at an undervalue he is entitled to recover the loss from the auditor. There can be no distinction in law between the shareholder's investment decision to sell the shares he has or to buy additional shares. It follows, therefore, that the scope of the duty of care owed to him by the auditor extends to cover any loss sustained consequent on the purchase of additional shares in reliance on the auditor's negligent report.

I believe this argument to be fallacious. Assuming without deciding that a claim by a shareholder to recover a loss suffered by selling his shares at an undervalue attributable to an undervaluation of the company's assets in the auditor's report could be sustained at all, it would not be by reason of any reliance by the shareholder on the auditor's report in deciding to sell; the loss would be referable to the depreciatory effect of the report on the market value of the shares before ever the decision of the shareholder to sell was taken. A claim to recoup a loss alleged to flow from the purchase of overvalued shares, on the other hand, can only be sustained on the basis of the purchaser's reliance on the report. The specious equation of “investment decisions” to sell or to buy as giving rise to parallel claims thus appears to me to be untenable. Moreover, the loss in the case of the sale would be of a loss of part of the value of the shareholder's existing holding, which, assuming a duty of care owed to individual shareholders, it might sensibly lie within the scope of the auditor's duty to protect. A loss, on the other hand, resulting from the purchase of additional shares would result from a wholly independent transaction having no connection with the existing shareholding.

I believe it is this last distinction which is of critical importance and which demonstrates the unsoundness of the conclusion reached by the majority of the Court of Appeal. It is never sufficient to ask simply whether A owes B a duty of care. It is always necessary to determine the scope of the duty by reference to the kind of damage from which A must take care to save B harmless. “The question is always whether the defendant was under a duty to avoid or prevent that damage, but the actual nature of the damage suffered is relevant to the existence and extent of any duty to avoid or prevent it:” see Sutherland Shire Council v. Heyman, 60 A.L.R. 1, 48, per Brennan J. Assuming for the purpose of the argument that the relationship between the auditor of a company and individual shareholders is of sufficient proximity to give rise to a duty of care, I do not understand how the scope of that duty can possibly extend beyond the protection of any individual shareholder from losses in the value of the shares which he holds. As a purchaser of additional shares in reliance on the auditor's report, he stands in no different position from any other investing member of the public to whom the auditor owes no duty.

Lord Oliver and Lord Jauncey, Lord Roskill and Lord Ackner agreed.

== Significance ==
The judgment overturned the decision of a judge at first instance in JEB Fasteners Ltd v Marks Bloom & Co. Caparo and its extent were further discussed in Her Majesty's Commissioners of Customs and Excise v Barclays Bank Plc and Moore Stephens v Stone Rolls Ltd.

The three-stage test given in Caparo is used to deal with novel issues of duty of care. The first test—reasonable foreseeability—is judged objectively and seeks to exclude liability that a reasonable person could not foresee. It draws on previous case law including Donoghue and Hedley Byrne. The use of reasonable foreseeability as a criterion in the establishing a duty of care is a very general one and is a different type of inquiry than the level of foreseeability used in determining elsewhere in negligence—breach and remoteness, specifically.

While it has been described as "uncertain" and "slippery" by some later judges (and as being an unhelpful circular definition by critical scholars), the proximity criteria identified in Caparo has been interpreted to include proximity in terms of geography, time, the relationship between parties, and causal proximity. The level of proximity has been significant in cases involving failure by to control a third party (along with public policy factors) such as Dorset Yacht Co Ltd v Home Office, as well as in cases of pure psychiatric injury to secondary victims (such as the Hillsborough cases including Alcock v Chief Constable of South Yorkshire Police).

The third part of the test in Caparo—whether the extension of liability is "fair, just and reasonable" (commonly known as policy considerations)—has been of relevance in a variety of contexts including controversial "wrongful conception" claims, and cases regarding the extent of liability that should be imposed on emergency services. Policy factors are inherently fact specific, but they have included concerns about "opening the floodgates", as well as the desire to avoid medical professionals and emergency services becoming overly cautious and defensive in their practices.

=== In other jurisdictions ===
- In New Zealand, Caparo stands in disagreement with a decision of the New Zealand Court of Appeal in Scott Group Ltd v McFarlane. In both of these cases a duty of care was found in substantially similar circumstances.
- In Australia, Caparo was followed in Esanda Finance Corporation Ltd v Peat Marwick Hungerfords. Caparo is also noted for the comments made as to the analysis of Brennan J of the Australian High Court in Council of the Shire of Sutherland v Heyman espousing the proposition that the law should develop novel categories of negligence 'incrementally and by analogy with established categories'. That observation was subsequently rejected in Sullivan v Moody, in which the High Court stated, at [49] that the “three-stage test…in Caparo…does not represent the law in Australia.”
- In Canada, Caparo was followed in Hercules Managements Ltd. v. Ernst & Young. Cooper v Hobart is sometimes acknowledged to be the Canadian equivalent of Caparo.

== See also ==
- Robinson v Chief Constable of West Yorkshire Police [2018] AC 736
