= Robinson v Chief Constable of West Yorkshire Police =

English tort law case

- Court: Supreme Court of the United Kingdom
- Full case name: Robinson (Appellant) v Chief Constable of West Yorkshire Police (Respondent)
- Decided: 8 February 2018
- Citation: [2018] UKSC 4

Court membership
- Judges sitting: Lady Hale; Lord Mance; Lord Reed; Lord Hughes; Lord Hodge

Case opinions
- Decision by: Lord Reed
- Concurrence: Lady Hale and Lord Hodge

Keywords
- arrest; duty of care; foreseeability; immunity from suit; personal injury; negligence; three-fold test; police officers

Robinson v Chief Constable of West Yorkshire Police [2018] UKSC 4 is a leading English tort law case on the test for finding a duty of care. An elderly woman was injured by two police officers attempting to arrest a suspect and she claimed that the police owed her a duty of care not to be put in danger. The UK Supreme Court found that the police did owe a duty of care in this case as there was no general rule that the police are not under any duty of care when performing their duties.

In reaching its decision, the Supreme Court reinterpreted and narrowed the leading case Caparo Industries plc v Dickman and found that there was no single test for determining the duty of care, instead urging for an approach based on common law, precedent, and the incremental development of the law. In novel cases, where established principles or previous cases did not already establish whether there would be a duty of care, the court would be entitled to go beyond these principles to decide whether to find one. The Supreme Court also reinterpreted Hill v Chief Constable of West Yorkshire to reject the proposition that the police would never owe a duty of care; rather, liability for negligence would arise where such liability would be present under ordinary tort principles. Robinson is considered one of the most important cases in 2018, as it clarifies the liability of the police to members of the public and the general test towards finding a duty of care in general, in a significant shift from Caparo, which held that there was a three-part test to determining duty of care.

== Facts ==
In July 2008, the appellant, a 76-year-old woman, was knocked over on a street in Huddersfield by a group of men. Two of the men, the defendants, were police officers and a third was a suspected drug dealer, whom they were attempting to arrest. As the officers struggled with the dealer, he backed into the appellant, who fell over and was injured. The officers had foreseen that the drug dealer would attempt to escape and did not notice that the appellant was in the immediate vicinity.

The appellant claimed that the officers had owed her a duty of care and had breached that duty. The recorder in the first instance had found that the officers had been negligent, but that the police were immune from claims against them in negligence; the recorder relied on Hill v Chief Constable of West Yorkshire [1987] UKHL 12. The Court of Appeal reversed the liability decision and held that the police owed no duty of care. It applied the Caparo test and indicated that most negligence claims and omissions by the police in the course of investigating and preventing crime would fail the third stage of the test: whether it was fair, just and reasonable to impose a duty. It also found that as the suspect, not the officers, was responsible for the harm, the case concerned an omission rather than a positive act. The appellant appealed to the Supreme Court.

== Judgment ==
The appeal was allowed, with Lord Reed giving the majority judgment, with which Lady Hale and Lord Hodge agreed. Lord Mance and Lord Hughes, while agreeing that there was a duty of care, dissented on the reasons why one existed.

After reviewing the facts, Lord Reed held that Caparo Industries v Dickman repudiated the idea that there was a single test for determining the existence of a duty of care and urged an approach based on common law, precedent, and the incremental development of the law by analogy with established authorities. Only in novel cases, where established principles did not provide an answer, would courts need to go beyond established principles to decide whether to recognize a duty of care. In the instant case, the existence of a duty depended on the application of established principles of negligence.

Lord Reed then went on to determine whether there was a general rule that the police were under no duty of care when performing operational duties. In applying Michael v Chief Constable of South Wales Police [2015] UKSC 2 and re-examining Hill v Chief Constable of West Yorkshire [1987] UKHL 12, he held that the latter case was misunderstood. The general law of tort applied to the police, who are subject to liability for causing personal injury; Hill expressly confirmed the police's liability for negligence where such liability would arise under ordinary tortious principles. However, the general duty of the police to enforce the criminal law does not carry with it a private law duty towards individual members of the public. The common law does not normally impose liability for omissions, or for a failure to prevent harm caused by the conduct of third parties. He states:

It follows that there is no general rule that the police are not under any duty of care when discharging their function of preventing and investigating crime. They generally owe a duty of care when such a duty arises under ordinary principles of the law of negligence, unless statute or the common law provides otherwise. Applying those principles, they may be under a duty of care to protect an individual from a danger of injury which they have themselves created, including a danger of injury resulting from human agency, as in Dorset Yacht and Attorney General of the British Virgin Islands v Hartwell. Applying the same principles, however, the police are not normally under a duty of care to protect individuals from a danger of injury which they have not themselves created, including injury caused by the conduct of third parties, in the absence of special circumstances such as an assumption of responsibility.

Lord Reed went on to state that the case concerned a positive act rather than an omission and found that the appellant's injuries were caused by the officers' breach of their duty of care; she was injured due to exposure to the danger from which the police had a duty of care to protect her. As a result, the appeal was allowed.

Lord Mance and Lord Hughes both agreed with the majority that the present case concerned a positive act and that there was a duty of care owed. However, Lord Mance found it unrealistic to suggest that the courts are not influenced by policy considerations where the conduct of the police may be analyzed as positive. However, he agreed that the courts should now recognize "the direct physical interface between the police and the public, in the course of an arrest placing an innocent passer-by at risk, as falling within a now established area of general police liability for positive negligent conduct which foreseeably and directly inflicts physical injury".

Lord Hughes referred to policy considerations which limit the duty of care that police owe to individuals and held that the greater public good requires the absence of any duty of care. He stated:

... policing may sometimes involve unavoidable risk to individuals. It may very often involve extremely delicate balancing of choices. Crowd control, hostage situations, violent outbreaks of crime and the allocation of scarce resources where there are large numbers of persons with the potential to offend, even at the terrorist level, are simply examples. Sometimes decisions may have to be made under extreme pressure; at other times they may remain very difficult notwithstanding time for analysis, and there may be a high level of risk that they turn out to be wrong. The question is always not whether, with hindsight, the decision was wrong, but whether in all the circumstances it was reasonable.

== Significance ==
Robinson is considered to be a significant decision on the question of the scope of the common law duty of care owed by the police when their activities lead to injuries in English tort law. Before the case was decided, Guy Jubb and Mark Solomon in the Financial Times called for Caparo to be reassessed in light of the Carillion inquiry.

Robinson is considered an unequivocal endorsement of the proposition that public authorities face the same test for common law duty of care as any other entity, rather than enduring higher or more lenient standards. Commentators suggest that the decision "made significant inroads" into the general public policy exclusion in Hill v Chief Constable of West Yorkshire. It is expected that Robinson will be an "unwelcome development" for police forces dealing with the ramifications of budget cuts, and has opened new questions on whether police officers will undergo a more defensive approach to arrests. Isabel McArdel, a barrister at One Crown Office Row, commented the decision brings "welcome clarification" and that it is "relatively unsurprising" that public servants be subject to a duty of care requiring them to take reasonable care to avoid injuring bystanders. However, Jacob Eisler at Jesus College, Cambridge, has criticized Lord Reed's judgment, arguing that any duty of care for public authorities that do not flow from general common law principles must not be made explicit in statute.

The case has also been cited with approval by several cases, including:

- Poole BC v GN [2019] UKSC 25: Confirms that Caparo did not impose a universal tripartite test for the existence of the duty of care and that public authorities are generally subject to the same principles of the law of negligence as private individuals, except to the extent that legislation requires departure from those principles.
- Al-Najar v Cumberland Hotel (London) Ltd [2019] EWHC 1593: Held that Robinson identifies four situations in which liability for omissions will be imposed, one of which is where a party has assumed a responsibility to protect another from a danger.
- Chief Constable of Essex v Transport Arendonk BvBa [2020] EWHC 212: Held that the possibility of a duty of care owed by the police was not precluded by statute, and there were no authorities that resolved the issue. The matter needed a full trial of the evidence.

== See also ==
- Dorset Yacht Co Ltd v Home Office – case cited by Lord Reed
