= Vollers =

Voller or Vollers may refer to:

- Voller Brothers, violin makers
- Vollers Corset Company, a corset manufacturer

== People with the surname ==
- Karl Vollers, German orientalist
- Kurt Vollers, American former football offensive lineman
- Marja-Liisa Völlers, German politician
- Maryanne Vollers, author and journalist
- Marco Völler, (born 1989), German basketball player
- Rudi Völler, (born 1960), German football player and manager
