= Stieller v Porirua City Council =

- Court: Court of Appeal of New Zealand
- Full case name: Brian Joseph Stieller & Kay Marian Stieller v The Porirua City Council
- Decided: 19 June 1986
- Citation: [1986] 1 NZLR 84
- Transcript: High Court judgment

Court membership
- Judges sitting: Cooke P, Richardson J, McMullin J

Keywords
- negligence

Stieller v Porirua City Council [1986] 1 NZLR 84 is a cited case in New Zealand regarding council liability in tort for negligent inspection.

== Background ==
The Stieller family had purchased a new house. Later, they discovered that the weatherboards were substandard, and that a stormwater drain was not connected.

Both defects had gone unnoticed by the local council building inspector.

The Stieller's sued the council for negligent building inspections.

== Held ==
The Court of Appeal ruled that the council owed the buyers of the house a duty of care, and awarded damages against the council.

Footnote: The Court of Appeal decided Stieller v Porirua City Council on the same day as Brown v Heathcote County Council and Craig v East Coast Bays City Council which also involved negligent council building inspections.
