= Mainguard Packaging Ltd v Hilton Haulage Ltd =

- Court: High Court of New Zealand
- Full case name: Mainguard Packaging Limited v Hilton Haulage Limited
- Citation: [1990] 1 NZLR 360

Court membership
- Judge sitting: Mahon J

Keywords
- negligence, foreseeability of loss

Mainguard Packaging Ltd v Hilton Haulage Ltd is a leading case in New Zealand regarding claims for damages for negligence as well as foreseeability of loss.

== Background ==
While reversing a truck at Mainguard's factory, one of Hilton Haulage's drivers, through negligence, backed into a power pole, breaking some of the attached power wires, causing a fire at the factory. Although the fire caused some damage to the factory, the factory was still able to function, except for the fact that hitting the pole caused a power cut. The fire would not normally have occurred under such circumstances, however due to the exceptionally high earth resistance of that neighbourhood, caused the fire. The factory owners claimed damages for the fire, as well as damages for loss of production(economic loss) due to the related power cut.

== Held ==
As the fire was not foreseeable, there was no liability. However, as the loss of production was due to the power cut, and the driver was negligent, an award for damages for economic loss was made.
