= South Pacific Manufacturing Co Ltd v New Zealand Security Consultants & Investigations Ltd =

- Court: Court of Appeal of New Zealand
- Full case name: South Pacific Manufacturing Co Ltd v New Zealand Security Consultants & Investigations Ltd
- Citation: [1992] 2 NZLR 282

Keywords
- negligence

South Pacific Manufacturing Co Ltd v New Zealand Security Consultants & Investigations Ltd [1992] 2 NZLR 282 is a cited case in New Zealand regarding duty of care in negligence
