= Esanda Finance Corporation Ltd v Peat Marwick Hungerfords =

Judgement of the High Court of Australia

- Court: High Court of Australia
- Full case name: Esanda Finance Corporation Ltd v Peat Marwick Hungerfords
- Decided: 18 March 1997
- Citation: (1997) 188 CLR 241 (1997) HCA 8

Case history
- Prior action: Esanda Finance Corporation Ltd v Peat Marwick Hungerfords (Reg) (1994) 61 SASR 424
- Subsequent action: none

Court membership
- Judges sitting: Brennan CJ, Gaudron, McHugh, Dawson, Toohey and Gummow JJ

Case opinions
- (6:0) Appeal Dismissed with costs, there is no cause of action in negligence for breach of duty available to the appellants.

Esanda Finance Corporation Ltd v Peat Marwick Hungerfords was a High Court of Australia case regarding the liability of auditors to third parties. It was decided on 18 March 1997. The appellant, Esanda, loaned money to a corporation in reliance on a report prepared by a finance company, Peat Marwick Hungerfords. When the borrower defaulted on the loan, Esanda turned to the auditors to recover claiming it had acted on reliance of audited accounts which breached mandatory accounting standards in relation to preparing the accounts and but for this breach of duty by Peat Marwick Hungerford. Central to this argument was that Esanda had suffered a loss which would not have occurred if not for reliance on Excel's audited accounts, which were prepared with a breach of standards.

The Court held that there was no cause of action successfully pleaded by the Appellant and that the appeal should be dismissed with costs. Although this order was unanimous, there were four different judgments emanating from the Court to explain why. This case is generally seen as authority for the proposition that auditors do not owe a duty of care to third parties. However, the case was decided using the multi-factorial approach with reasons against finding a duty being: that Esanda, as a corporation, was not vulnerable as it could have made its own enquiries regarding the financial position of the borrower; and that allowing the appeal may have given rise to indeterminate liability to the auditor.

== See also ==
- Ultramares Corporation v. Touche (1932) - leading U.S. case on same issue.
