= Clearlite Holdings Ltd v Auckland City Corp =

Legal case in New Zealand

- Court: High Court of New Zealand
- Full case name: Clearlite Holdings Limited v Auckland City Corporation
- Decided: 20 August 1976
- Citation: [1976] 2 NZLR 729

Court membership
- Judge sitting: Mahon J

Keywords
- negligence

Clearlite Holdings Ltd v Auckland City Corp [1976] 2 NZLR 729 is a cited case in New Zealand regarding land based nuisance claims in tort.

== Background ==
Auckland City arranged for their contractor to drive a tunnel under Clearlites factory in order to install a drainage pipe.

For reasons not stated, the tunnel caused the concrete floor to crack due to the soil subsiding 2 inches, which cost Clearlite $19,873.91 to fix.

After the council refused to reimburse them for the cost to fix their floor, Clearlite sued both Auckland City and the contractor for negligence as well as in nuisance.

== Held ==
The court ruled that as the collapse was not the fault of the council or their contactor, the negligence claim must fail. However, the nuisance claim was successful as for nuisance cases, negligence is not required to be proved, merely foreseeability, and damages of $19,873.91 were awarded to Clearlite.
