= Balfour Declaration (disambiguation) =

The Balfour Declaration was a 1917 letter which stated the British government's support for the establishment of a Jewish homeland in Palestine.

Balfour Declaration may also refer to:

- Balfour Declaration (1926), which granted autonomy to the Dominions of the British Empire

== See also ==
- Balfour (disambiguation)
