= Ultramares Corp. v. Touche =

US tort law case

Ultramares Corporation v. Touche
- Court: New York Court of Appeals
- Full case name: ULTRAMARES CORPORATION, Appellant and Respondent v GEORGE A. TOUCHE et al., Copartners under the Firm Name of TOUCHE, NIVEN & COMPANY, Respondents and Appellants
- Decided: January 6, 1931
- Citation: 174 N.E. 441 (1932)
- Transcript

Court membership
- Judges sitting: Cardozo J, POUND, CRANE, LEHMAN, KELLOGG, O'BRIEN and HUBBS

Keywords
- Auditor liability, duty of care

Ultramares Corporation v. Touche, 174 N.E. 441 (1932) is a US tort law case regarding negligent misstatement, decided by Cardozo, C.J. It contained the now famous line on "floodgates" that the law should not admit "to a liability in an indeterminate amount for an indeterminate time to an indeterminate class."

== Facts ==
In 1924 auditors Touche Niven gave the rubber importer, Fred Stern and Company, an unqualified audit certificate, having failed to discover that management had falsified entries to overstate accounts receivable. The auditors knew that the accounts when certified would be used to raise money and for that purpose supplied 32 certified and serially numbered copies: p. 442. On the faith of one of those copies, given to it on its demand, the plaintiff, Ultramares Corporation, lent Fred Stern and Company money. Stern declared bankruptcy in 1925. Ultramares sued Touche Niven for the amount of the Stern debt, declaring that a careful audit would have shown Stern to be insolvent. The audit was found to be negligent, but not fraudulent. The judge set this finding aside based on the doctrine of privity, which protects auditors from third party suits. An intermediate appellate court reinstated the negligence verdict. The case then went to the New York Court of Appeals, Judge Benjamin Cardozo presiding.

== Judgment ==
Cardozo, C.J., held that the claim in negligence failed on the ground that the auditors owed the plaintiff no duty of care, there being no sufficiently proximate relationship.

The two causes of action will be considered in succession, first the one for negligence and second that for fraud.

(1) We think the evidence supports a finding that the audit was negligently made, though in so saying we put aside for the moment the question whether negligence, even if it existed, was a wrong to the plaintiff. To explain fully or adequately how the defendants were at fault would carry this opinion beyond reasonable bounds. A sketch, however, there must be, at least in respect of some features of the audit, for the nature of the fault, when understood, is helpful in defining the ambit of the duty.

We begin with the item of accounts receivable. At the start of the defendant's audit, there had been no posting of the general ledger since April, 1923. Siess, a junior accountant, was assigned by the defendants to the performance of that work. On Sunday, February 3, 1924, he had finished the task of posting, and was ready the next day to begin with his associates the preparation of the balance sheet and the audit of its items. The total of the accounts receivable for December, 1923, as thus posted by Siess from the entries in the journal, was $644,758.17. At some time on February 3, Romberg, an employee of the Stern company, who had general charge of its accounts, placed below that total another item to represent additional accounts receivable growing out of the transactions of the month. This new item, $706,843.07, Romberg entered in his own handwriting. The sales that it represented were, each and all, fictitious. Opposite the entry were placed other figures (12-29), indicating or supposed to indicate a reference to the journal. Siess when he resumed his work saw the entries thus added, and included the new item in making up his footings, with the result of an apparent increase of over $700,000 in the assets of the business. He says that in doing this he supposed the entries to be correct, and that his task at the moment being merely to post the books, he thought the work of audit or verification might come later, and put it off accordingly. The time sheets, which are in evidence, show very clearly that this was the order of time in which the parts of the work were done. Verification, however, there never was either by Siess or by his superiors, or so the triers of the facts might say. If any had been attempted, or any that was adequate, an examiner would have found that the entry in the ledger was not supported by any entry in the journal. If from the journal he had gone to the book from which the journal was made up, described as "the debit memo book," support would still have failed. Going farther, he would have found invoices, seventeen in number, which amounted in the aggregate to the interpolated item, but scrutiny of these invoices would have disclosed suspicious features in that they had no shipping number nor a customer's order number and varied in terms of credit and in other respects from those usual in the business. A mere glance reveals the difference.

The December entry of accounts receivable was not the only item that a careful and skillful auditor would have desired to investigate. There was ground for suspicion as to an item of $113,199.60, included in the accounts payable as due from the Baltic Corporation. As to this the defendants received an explanation, not very convincing, from Stern and Romberg. A cautious auditor might have been dissatisfied and have uncovered what was wrong. There was ground for suspicion also because of the inflation of the inventory. The inventory as it was given to the auditors, was totaled at $347,219.08. The defendants discovered errors in the sum of $303,863.20, and adjusted the balance sheet accordingly. Both the extent of the discrepancy and its causes might have been found to cast discredit upon the business and the books. There was ground for suspicion again in the record of assigned accounts. Inquiry of the creditors gave notice to the defendants that the same accounts had been pledged to two, three and four banks at the same time. The pledges did not diminish the value of the assets, but made in such circumstances they might well evoke a doubt as to the solvency of a business where such conduct was permitted. There was an explanation by Romberg which the defendants accepted as sufficient. Caution and diligence might have pressed investigation farther.

If the defendants owed a duty to the plaintiff to act with the same care that would have been due under a contract of employment, a jury was at liberty to find a verdict of negligence upon a showing of a scrutiny so imperfect and perfunctory. No doubt the extent to which inquiry must be pressed beyond appearances is a question of judgment, as to which opinions will often differ. No doubt the wisdom that is born after the event will engender suspicion and distrust when old acquaintance and good repute may have silenced doubt at the beginning. All this is to be weighed by a jury in applying its standard of behavior, the state of mind and conduct of the reasonable man. Even so, the adverse verdict, when rendered, imports an alignment of the weights in their proper places in the balance and a reckoning thereafter. The reckoning was not wrong upon the evidence before us, if duty be assumed.

We are brought to the question of duty, its origin and measure.

The defendants owed to their employer a duty imposed by law to make their certificate without fraud, and a duty growing out of contract to make it with the care and caution proper to their calling. Fraud includes the pretense of knowledge when knowledge there is none. To creditors and investors to whom the employer exhibited the certificate, the defendants owed a like duty to make it without fraud, since there was notice in the circumstances of its making that the employer did not intend to keep it to himself (Eaton, Cole & Burnham Co. v. Avery, 83 N. Y. 31; Tindle v. Birkett, 171 N. Y. 520). A different question develops when we ask whether they owed a duty to these to make it without negligence. If liability for negligence exists, a thoughtless slip or blunder, the failure to detect a theft or forgery beneath the cover of deceptive entries, may expose accountants to a liability in an indeterminate amount for an indeterminate time to an indeterminate class. The hazards of a business conducted on these terms are so extreme as to enkindle doubt whether a flaw may not exist in the implication of a duty that exposes to these consequences. We put aside for the moment any statement in the certificate which involves the representation of a fact as true to the knowledge of the auditors. If such a statement was made, whether believed to be true or not, the defendants are liable for deceit in the event that it was false. The plaintiff does not need the invention of novel doctrine to help it out in such conditions. The case was submitted to the jury and the verdict was returned upon the theory that even in the absence of a misstatement of a fact there is a liability also for erroneous opinion. The expression of an opinion is to be subject to a warranty implied by law. What, then, is the warranty, as yet unformulated, to be? Is it merely that the opinion is honestly conceived and that the preliminary inquiry has been honestly pursued, that a halt has not been made without a genuine belief that the search has been reasonably adequate to bring disclosure of the truth? Or does it go farther and involve the assumption of a liability for any blunder or inattention that could fairly be spoken of as negligence if the controversy were one between accountant and employer for breach of a contract to render services for pay?

The assault upon the citadel of privity is proceeding in these days apace. How far the inroads shall extend is now a favorite subject of juridical discussion (Williston, Liability for Honest Misrepresentation, 24 Harv. L. Rev. 415, 433; Bohlen, Studies in the Law of Torts, pp. 150, 151; Bohlen, Misrepresentation as Deceit, Negligence or Warranty, 42 Harv. L. Rev. 733; Smith, Liability for Negligent Language, 14 Harv. L. Rev. 184; Green, Judge and Jury, chapter Deceit, p. 280; 16 Va. Law Rev. 749). In the field of the law of contract there has been a gradual widening of the doctrine of Lawrence v. Fox (20 N. Y. 268), until today the beneficiary of a promise, clearly designated as such, is seldom left without a remedy (Seaver v. Ransom, 224 N. Y. 233, 238). Even in that field, however, the remedy is narrower where the beneficiaries of the promise are indeterminate or general. Something more must then appear than an intention that the promise shall redound to the benefit of the public or to that of a class of indefinite extension. The promise must be such as to "bespeak the assumption of a duty to make reparation directly to the individual members of the public if the benefit is lost" (Moch Co. v. Rensselaer Water Co., 247 N. Y. 160, 164; American Law Institute, Restatement of the Law of Contracts, § 145). In the field of the law of torts a manufacturer who is negligent in the manufacture of a chattel in circumstances pointing to an unreasonable risk of serious bodily harm to those using it thereafter may be liable for negligence though privity is lacking between manufacturer and user (MacPherson v. Buick Motor Co., 217 N. Y. 382; American Law Institute. Restatement of the Law of Torts, § 262). A force or instrument of harm having been launched with potentialities of danger manifest to the eye of prudence, the one who launches it is under a duty to keep it within bounds (Moch Co. v. Rensselaer Water Co., supra, at p. 168). Even so, the question is still open whether the potentialities of danger that will charge with liability are confined to harm to the person, or include injury to property (Pine Grove Poultry Farm v. Newton B.-P. Mfg. Co., 248 N. Y. 293, 296; Robins Dry Dock & Repair Co. v. Flint, 275 U. S. 303; American Law Institute, Restatement of the Law of Torts, supra). In either view, however, what is released or set in motion is a physical force. We are now asked to say that a like liability attaches to the circulation of a thought or a release of the explosive power resident in words.

Three cases in this court are said by the plaintiff to have committed us to the doctrine that words, written or oral, if negligently published with the expectation that the reader or listener will transmit them to another, will lay a basis for liability though privity be lacking. These are Glanzer v. Shepard (233 N. Y. 236); International Products Co. v. Erie R. R. Co. (244 N. Y. 331), and Doyle v. Chatham & Phenix Nat. Bank (253 N. Y. 369).

A requirement of privity, not of contract but of relationship, was laid down.

== Other uses ==
- The rule set forth in Ultramares is still the law in New York: Credit Alliance Corporation v. Arthur Andersen & Co. 483 N.E. 2d 110 (1985).
- A much less restrictive rule has been followed elsewhere: see, e.g., Rosenblum Inc. v. Adler 461 A. 2d 138 (1983); Citizens State Bank v. Timm, Schmidt & Co. 335 N.W. 2d 361 (1983).
- In Rhode Island Hospital Trust National Bank v. Swartz, Bresenoff, Yavner & Jacobs 455 F. 2d 847, 851, (1972) a United States Court of Appeals, applying Rhode Island law, applied the rule that an accountant should be liable in negligence for careless financial misrepresentations relied upon by actually foreseen and limited classes of persons.
- In Ingram Industries Inc. v. Nowicki 527 F. Supp. 683 (1981), a federal judge applying the law of Kentucky relied on Section 552 of the Restatement (Second) of Torts. Section 552 provides:

Information Negligently Supplied for the Guidance of others (1) One who, in the course of his business, profession or employment, or in any other transaction in which he has a pecuniary interest, supplies false information for the guidance of others in their business transactions, is subject to liability for pecuniary loss caused to them by their justifiable reliance upon the information, if he fails to exercise reasonable care or competence in obtaining or communicating the information. (2) Except as stated in subsection (3), the liability stated in subsection (1) is limited to loss suffered (a) by the person or one of a limited group of persons for whose benefit and guidance he intends to supply the information or knows that the recipient intends to supply it; and (b) through reliance upon it in a transaction that he intends the information to influence or knows that the recipient so intends or in a substantially similar transaction. (3) The liability of one who is under a public duty to give the information extends to loss suffered by any of the class of persons for whose benefit the duty is created, in any of the transactions in which it is intended to protect them.

- In Bily v. Arthur Young & Co., 3 Cal. 4th 370, 834 P.2d 745, 11 Cal. Rptr. 2d 51 (1992), the Supreme Court of California analyzed Ultramares and subsequent developments in painstaking detail, then followed New York in declining to impose a general duty of care upon accountants as to the conduct of audits extending to parties other than the accountant's own client. However, the court also adopted the test of Section 552 of Restatement (Second) of Torts under which an accountant can be held liable to third parties under a negligent misrepresentation theory. Under the Bily analysis, when a company is belatedly found to have cooked its books, an investor who simply assumed the company was solvent cannot recover from its accountants, but an investor who actually requested, read, and relied upon its accountants' audit reports may have a cause of action.

== See also ==
- Caparo v. Dickman
