= Patrick O'Connor (judge) =

The Right Honourable Sir Patrick O'Connor

Lord Justice of Appeal
- In office 1980–1989

Justice of the High Court
- In office 1966–1980

Personal details
- Born: Patrick McCarthy O'Connor; 28 December 1914 British India
- Died: 3 May 2001 (aged 86)
- Children: 4
- Education: Downside School; Merton College, Oxford

Sir Patrick McCarthy O'Connor, PC (28 December 1914 – 3 May 2001) was a British judge, who was a Lord Justice of Appeal between 1980 and 1989. He is best remembered as one of the three judges who rejected the second appeal by the Birmingham Six in 1988.

== Biography ==
Born in India, O'Connor was the son of William Patrick O’Connor, a doctor. His Scottish mother died when he was nine, while his father died when he was 11. He was sent back to England and was educated at Downside School and Merton College, Oxford (honorary fellow, 1987), where he read History. He was called to the Bar by the Inner Temple in 1940 (bencher, 1966). He was the pupil and, later, the tenant of Ronald Armstrong-Jones at 2 Crown Office Row. He had originally intended to join the Diplomatic Service or the Royal Navy, but was turned down by both on medical grounds.

Having started his career specializing in personal injury claims and claims under the Workmen's Compensation Acts, after the war O'Connor acquired a large practice in employer negligence litigation. He was appointed junior counsel to the Post Office and was made a Queen's Counsel in 1960. O'Connor was Recorder of King's Lynn from 1959 to 1961 and of Southend from 1961 to 1966.

In 1966, O'Connor was appointed a Justice of the High Court and assigned to the Queen's Bench Division, receiving the customary knighthood. In 1967, he sentenced the gangster Charles Richardson to 12 years' imprisonment for conspiracy to pervert the course of justice. He also presided over a string of high-profile libel cases.

In 1980, Richardson was appointed a Lord Justice of Appeal and sworn of the Privy Council. His 1988 dissent in Caparo Industries plc v Dickman was later adopted by the House of Lords. In 1989, he was one of the three judges (sitting with Lord Lane and Lord Justice Stephen Brown) who rejected an appeal by the Birmingham Six, whose convictions were quashed in 1991. He retired in 1989.

A devout Catholic, O'Connor was involved with Catholic charities such as the (British) Thomas More Society and Downside School.

== Family ==
O'Connor married in 1938 Mary Garland Griffin, whom he had met at Oxford. She was the daughter of William Martin Griffin, KC, of Vancouver. They had two sons and two daughters. Lady O'Connor died in 1984.
