= Osman v United Kingdom =

European Court of Human Rights decision

Osman v United Kingdom was a case heard by the European Court of Human Rights on human rights law in the United Kingdom. Judgment was given on 28 October 1998.

As a consequence, British police have a duty to warn potential victims when they have intelligence of a threat to their lives. These threat to life warnings are commonly known as Osman warnings.

== Background ==
The applicants were British citizens resident in London. The first applicant, Mulkiye Osman, was the widow of Ali Osman, who was shot dead by Paul Paget-Lewis on 7 March 1988. The second applicant, Ahmet Osman, was her son, born in 1972. He was a former pupil of Paget-Lewis at Homerton House School, and was wounded in the shooting which led to the death of his father.

The applicants' complaints were directed at the failure of the authorities to appreciate and act on what they claim was a series of clear warning signs that Paget-Lewis represented a serious threat to the physical safety of Ahmet Osman and his family. The applicants argued that the police had been given information which should have made it clear that the individual posed a danger.

== Judgment ==
The English courts all agreed that the police owed no duty of care to the applicants, confirming the law in Hill v Chief Constable of West Yorkshire where it was ruled that the police owed no duty of care to one of the victims of the Yorkshire Ripper. On appeal to Strasbourg in 1998, the European Court of Human Rights ruled that such blanket immunity would be a breach of article 6 of the European Convention on Human Rights, but that there was no breach of articles 2 and 8. For the first time, the court applied a doctrinal principle today known as the Osman test. The aim of this test is to interpret the positive obligations under the Convention in such a way that they do "not impose an impossible or disproportionate burden on the authorities".

== Osman warning ==
A consequence of the case is that police in the United Kingdom issue threat to life warning notices, commonly known as Osman warnings, to people when there is intelligence of a threat to their life.

== See also ==
- Death threat
