= Craig v East Coast Bays City Council =

- Court: Court of Appeal of New Zealand
- Full case name: G H Craig v East Coast Bays City Council
- Decided: 19 June 1986
- Citation: [1986] 1 NZLR 99
- Transcript: High Court judgment

Court membership
- Judges sitting: Cooke P, Richardson J, Tompkins J

Keywords
- negligence

Craig v East Coast Bays City Council [1986] 1 NZLR 99 is a cited case in New Zealand regarding council liability for negligent inspection.

== Background ==
Craig owned a house in Murrays Bay. On the section in front of his house, his neighbour started building a new house, within 3.8 metres of his boundary.

During construction, he realized that when completed, the house would obstruct his views, and he complained to the council without success.

He later discovered, that according to the District Plan, any building constructed within 6 metres of a property boundary, must be publicly notified, which if this had happened Craig could have filed an objection.

And the house was originally planned to be built 6 metres from Craigs property, however this would have involved building over a council sewer line. To avoid difficulties of building over a sewer line, the site plan was moved to within 3.8 metres.

Whilst this was still outside the District Plan, the council had powers to give exemptions to complying with the District Plan, and gave an exemption in this case.

However, it later transpired that due to a misinterpretation of the rules, the council did not have the legal authority to grant an exemption in this instance.

Craig sued the council for $40,000 in damages for negligence.

== Held ==
The Court of Appeal upheld the High Courts award of damages of $2,250.

Footnote: The Court of Appeal decided Craig v East Coast Bays City Council on the same day as Brown v Heathcote County Council and Stieller v Porirua City Council, which also involved negligent council building inspections.
