= Mount Albert Borough Council v Johnson =

- Court: Court of Appeal of New Zealand
- Full case name: Mount Albert Borough Council (First appealant) & Sydney Construction Limited (Second Apeallant) v Constance Ngaroma Johnson (and others)
- Decided: 18 October 1979
- Citation: [1979] 2 NZLR 234
- Transcript: Court of Appeal judgment

Court membership
- Judges sitting: Cooke P, Richardson J, Somers J

Keywords
- negligence

Mount Albert Borough Council v Johnson [1979] 2 NZLR 234 is a cited case in New Zealand regarding the Statute of Limitations defence in tort claims.

== Background ==
Sydney Construction purchased a 3-acre block of land in Mt Albert, with the intention of a residential development. At the time of the sale, the seller had informed Sydney that there was rubbish buried in the land.

Sydney subsequently subdivided the land, and built numerous houses there. On the section that Johnson ultimately purchased, six flats were constructed in 1967.

In 1970, Johnson purchased the flat, and within the year she had noticed subsidence in the building, and as a result she got an engineer to do an inspection.

The engineer did some test drilling, and discovered amongst other rubbish, gib board and motor vehicle parts buried in the foundation, requiring 20 steel poles to be drilled to rectify the subsidence.

Johnson in 1973 sued the council for negligently approving the building permit. Then council filed for Sydney Construction to be made a third party, which Johnson later applied to have Sydney listed as a codefendant.

The High Court awarded Johnson $10,000 in damages.

The Council appealed.

== Held ==
The court dismissed the appeal.
