= SS Empire Balfour =

Refrigerated cargo ship

History
- Name: Empire Balfour (1944–49); Barton Grange (1949–58); Sunlight (1958–67)
- Owner: Ministry of War Transport (1944–49); Houlder Bros & Co Ltd, Glasgow (1949–58); Western Steamship Co Ltd, Hong Kong (1958–62); Pan-Norse Steamship Co SA, Panama (1962–67)
- Operator: Elders & Fyffes Ltd (1944–45); Houlder Bros & Co Ltd (1945–58); Wang Kee & Co Ltd, Hong Kong (1958–62); Wallem & Co Ltd, Hong Kong (1962–67)
- Port of registry: (United Kingdom) Glasgow (1944–58); (United Kingdom) Hong Kong (1958–62); Panama (1962–67)
- Builder: Lithgows Ltd, Port Glasgow
- Yard number: 998
- Launched: 27 June 1944
- Completed: September 1944
- Identification: Official Number 169514 (1944–58); Code Letters GFLW (1944–49)

General characteristics
- Tonnage: 7,201 GRT; 9,414 DWT; 4,272 NRT
- Length: 432 ft 7 in (131.85 m)
- Beam: 56 ft 2 in (17.12 m)
- Depth: 34 ft 4 in (10.46 m)
- Propulsion: 1 x triple expansion steam engine (Harland & Wolff Ltd, Glasgow) 560 hp (420 kW)
- Capacity: 285,644 cubic feet (8,088.5 m^{3}) refrigerated cargo space

Empire Balfour was a 7,201 ton refrigerated cargo ship which was built by Lithgows Ltd, Port Glasgow in 1944 for the Ministry of War Transport (MoWT). She was sold to her managers in 1949 and renamed Barton Grange. In 1958 she was sold to the Western Steamship Co Ltd, Hong Kong and renamed Sunlight. In 1962, she was sold to the Pan-Norse Steamship Co SA, Panama, serving for a further five years until scrapped in 1967.

== History ==
Empire Balfour was built by Lithgows Ltd, Port Glasgow as yard number 998. She was launched on 27 June 1945 and completed in September 1944. She was initially operated under the management of Elders & Fyffes Ltd, and then Houlder Brothers & Co Ltd, Newport, Monmouthshire.

=== War service ===
Empire Balfour was a member of a number of convoys during the Second World War

SC 160

Convoy SC 160 sailed from Halifax, Nova Scotia on 2 November 1944 and arrived at Liverpool on 17 November. Empire Balfour was carrying a cargo of meat, mail, and general cargo, with a destination of Avonmouth.

SC 166

Convoy SC 166 sailed from Halifax, Nova Scotia on 31 January 1945 and arrived at Liverpool on 13 February. Empire Balfour carried the Commodore of the convoy. She was carrying a cargo of meat, metal and general cargo, with a destination of Liverpool.

=== Postwar ===
In 1947, Houlder Line reported that during 1946 they had taken Empire Balfour on bareboat charter for a period of three years. In 1949, Empire Balfour was sold to her managers for approximately £165,000 and renamed Barton Grange. She was converted from coal to oil fuel and improvements made in the crew's accommodation at a cost of £45,000. She served with Houlder Brothers for another nine years. In 1958, Barton Grange was sold to the Western Steamship Co Ltd, Hong Kong and renamed Sunlight. She was operated under the management of Wang Kee & Co Ltd, Hong Kong. After serving with Western for four years, Sunlight was sold to the Pan-Norse Steamship Co SA, Panama. She was operated under the management of Wallem & Co Ltd, Hong Kong. She served for five years with Pan-Norse. Sunlight arrived on 30 March 1967 at Hong Kong for scrapping.

== Official number and code letters ==
Official Numbers were a forerunner to IMO Numbers.

Empire Balfour had the UK Official Number 169514 and used the Code Letters GFLW.
