= Bowen v Paramount Builders (Hamilton) Ltd =

- Court: Court of Appeal of New Zealand
- Full case name: Bowen v Paramount Builders (Hamilton) Ltd
- Decided: 22 December 1976
- Citation: [1977] 1 NZLR 394
- Transcript: High Court judgment

Court membership
- Judges sitting: Richmond P, Woodhouse J, Cooke J

Keywords
- negligence

Bowen v Paramount Builders (Hamilton) Ltd [1977] 1 NZLR 394 is a cited case in New Zealand regarding liability in tort defective products. It is infamous among New Zealand law students for being one of the hardest and longest cases they have to study in their first year.

== Background ==
Due to a shortage of land to build on around Hamilton, developers were now subdividing land that had previously been deemed unsuitable for building on. This included the subdivision on peat that Paramount Builders were building a house on a section purchased by the MacKays.

The Mackay's had purchased the section from the developer on the condition that they lay a sand base for the building foundations.

The MacKay's then arranged Paramount to build a house on top of this foundation. During construction though, the local building inspector recognized that a sand base would not be strong enough and ordered Paramount to cease construction.

Paramount then redesigned a new concrete foundation, and restarted construction.

As construction was near completion, the MacKay's complained to the builders that there was a sag in the building, but they were told it was just an "optical illusion".

The Mackay's however did not believe this, and on sold the house to the hapless Bowen's as soon as they could.

The Bowen's eventually discovered their house had subsided due to inadequate foundations.

They sued the builders for negligence.

== Held ==
The court awarded the buyers of the house damages.
