= Balfour (given name) =

Balfour is a masculine given name which may refer to:

- Balfour Currie (1902–1981), Canadian meteorologist and climatologist
- H. Balfour Gardiner (1877–1950), British musician, composer, and teacher
- Balfour Mount (born 1939), Canadian physician, surgeon, and academic, considered the father of palliative care in North America
- Balfour Stewart (1828–1887), Scottish physicist and meteorologist
