= Vollers (company) =

Vollers was a corset manufacturer located in Portsmouth, England.

== History ==
It was founded by Harry and Nelly Voller in 1899. The company operated a Portsmouth factory ran by Ian and Corina Voller.

It manufactured overbust and underbust corset styles in fabrics including satin, silk, PVC, denim, glitter, velvet and brocade. Many designs were based on 19th century patterns .
