= Balfour Castle, Angus =

Balfour Castle
- Balfour Mains, Angus, Scotland
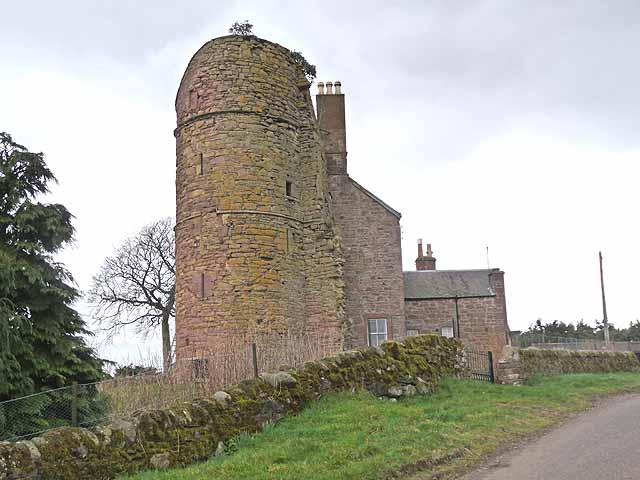
- The castle in 2012

Site information
- Type: Mansion
- Open to the public: Private
- Condition: Partially demolished

Location
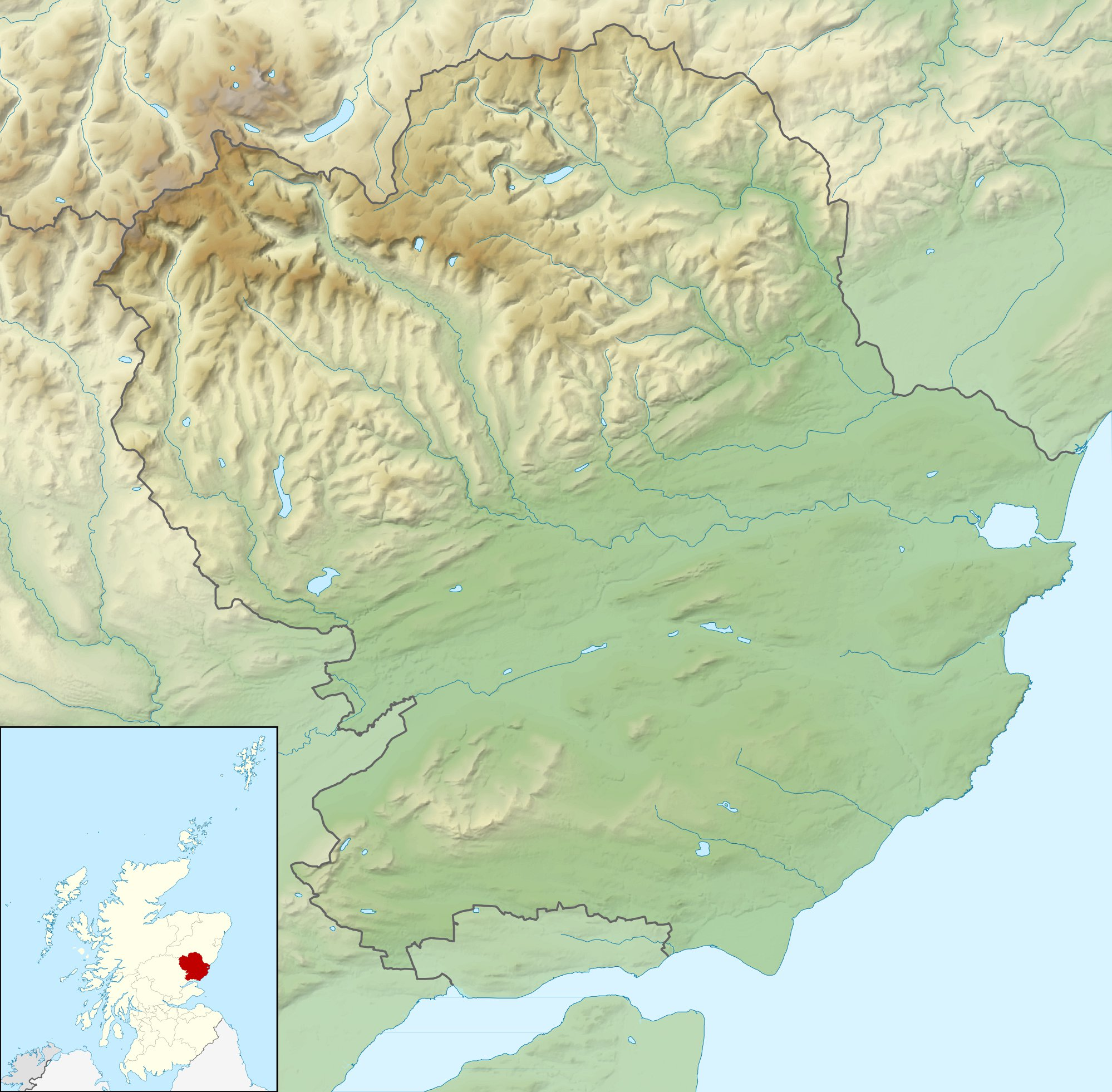
- Shown within Angus
- Coordinates: 56.6784°N 3.0825°W
- Grid reference: grid reference NO 3377 5460

Site history
- Built: 16th century
- Materials: Stone

Balfour Castle was a baronial mansion at Balfour Mains, near Kirkton of Kingoldrum, Angus, Scotland. The castle was built in the 16th century and was largely demolished except for a six-storey circular tower. A farm house has been built incorporating some of the ruins in c. 1845. The farmhouse and castle remains were designated as a Category B listed building in 1971.
