= Invercargill City Council v Hamlin =

- Court: Court of Appeal of New Zealand
- Full case name: Invercargill City Council v Noel Gordon Hamlin
- Citation: [1994] 3 NZLR 513, [1996] 1 NZLR 513
- Transcript: Privy Council judgment

Court membership
- Judges sitting: Cooke P, Richardson J, McKay J

Keywords
- negligence

Invercargill City Council v Hamlin [1994] 3 NZLR 513, [1996] 1 NZLR 513 is a cited case in New Zealand regarding council liability for negligent inspection, as well the issue in tort when the start period for the statute of limitations for a latent defect begins.

== Background ==
Hamlin built a house in 1972 in Invercargill. 17 years later in 1989, Hamlin noticed cracks in his houses foundations. A subsequent builders report revealed the council had signed off building consent on the house when it had substandard foundations.

Hamlin sought compensation from the council, who refused to pay, claiming that a council does not owe a duty of care for building inspections, and even if it was, the council was not liable here, as the event happened 17 years, this claim was barred by the 6 year time limit under the Statute of Limitations.

== Held ==
The High Court found the council liable, and awarded damages of $53,550. The council subsequently unsuccessfully appealed to the Court of Appeal, as well as the Privy Council.

Footnote: Section 393 (2) of The Building Act 2004 now limits such a claim to 10 years from the date of the act or omission giving rise to the claim.
