= Balfour Building =

Coordinates: 43.647038°N 79.395286°W

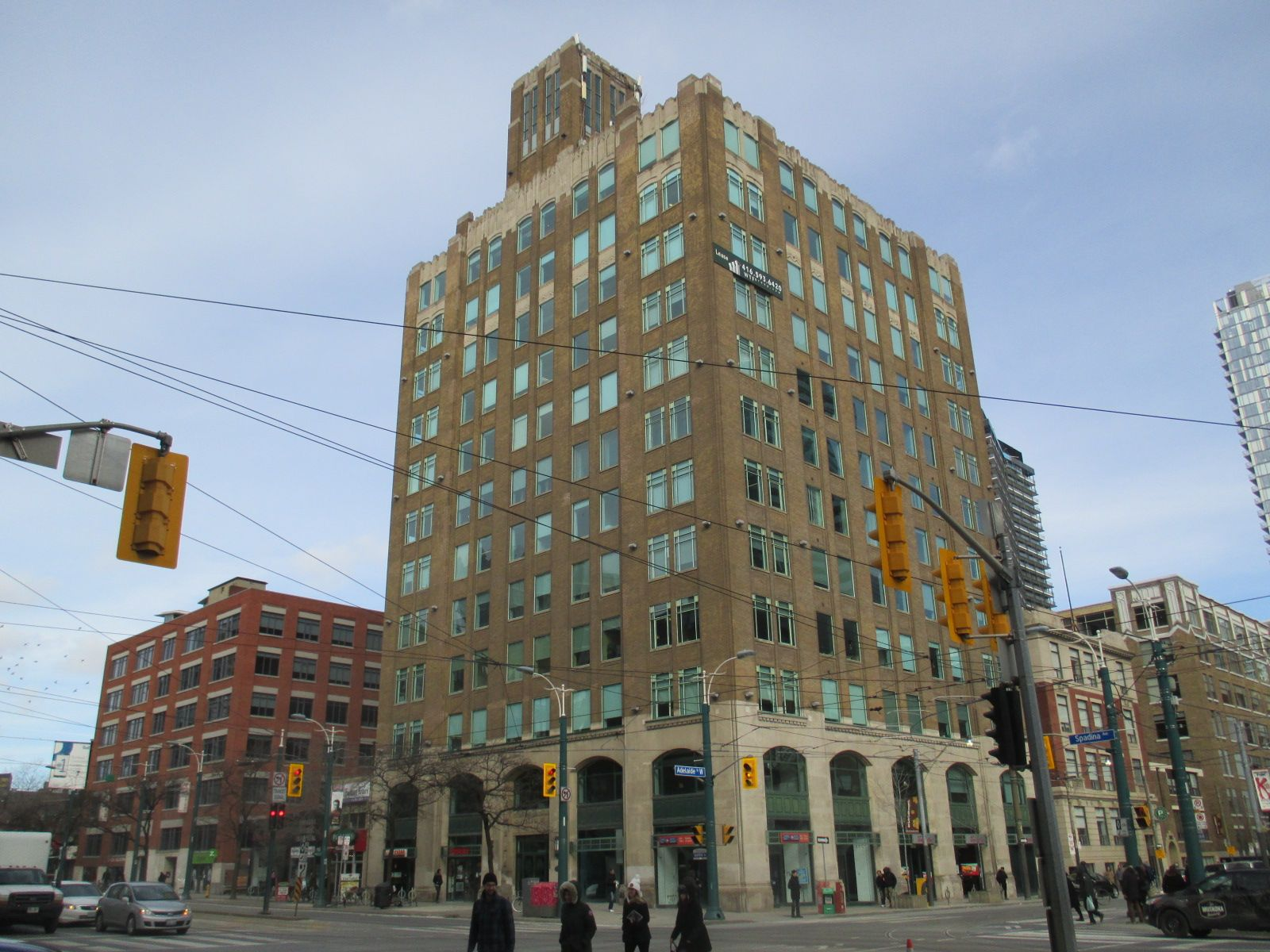
- Location in Ontario
- Interactive map of the Balfour Building area
- Etymology: British statesman Arthur J. Balfour (Earl of Balfour)

General information
- Status: Completed
- Type: high-rise
- Architectural style: Art Deco
- Location: Toronto, Ontario, 119 Spadina Avenue, Canada

Height
- Height: 48m

Technical details
- Material: glass, limestone, brick
- Floor count: 12
- Floor area: 4,370 sq ft (406 m^{2})
- Lifts/elevators: 3

Design and construction
- Architect: Benjamin Brown
- Main contractor: H.A Wickett Construction

The Balfour Building is located at the Northeast corner of Spadina Avenue and Adelaide Street in downtown Toronto, Ontario, Canada, close to the Financial and Entertainment districts, Gardiner Expressway, and the LRT. It was named after Arthur J. Balfour, author of the "Balfour Declaration" in 1917, whose goal was for the British government to support a Jewish homeland in Palestine. The high-rise was built originally for the Schiffer-Hillman Clothing Company; it was managed by numerous Jewish clothing companies in its early years. Presently, the Balfour Building is a historical tower landmark of Art Deco style in the 1930s. Elevators were installed by Otis-Fensom of Hamilton. The building has hardwood flooring, a rooftop terrace and various recently added features, including forced air heating and centrally controlled air conditioning.

The Balfour Building was listed as a Toronto Heritage Property in 2011 by the City of Toronto Heritage Property Inventory.
