= Hill v Chief Constable of West Yorkshire =

English legal case regarding duty of care of police towards crime victims

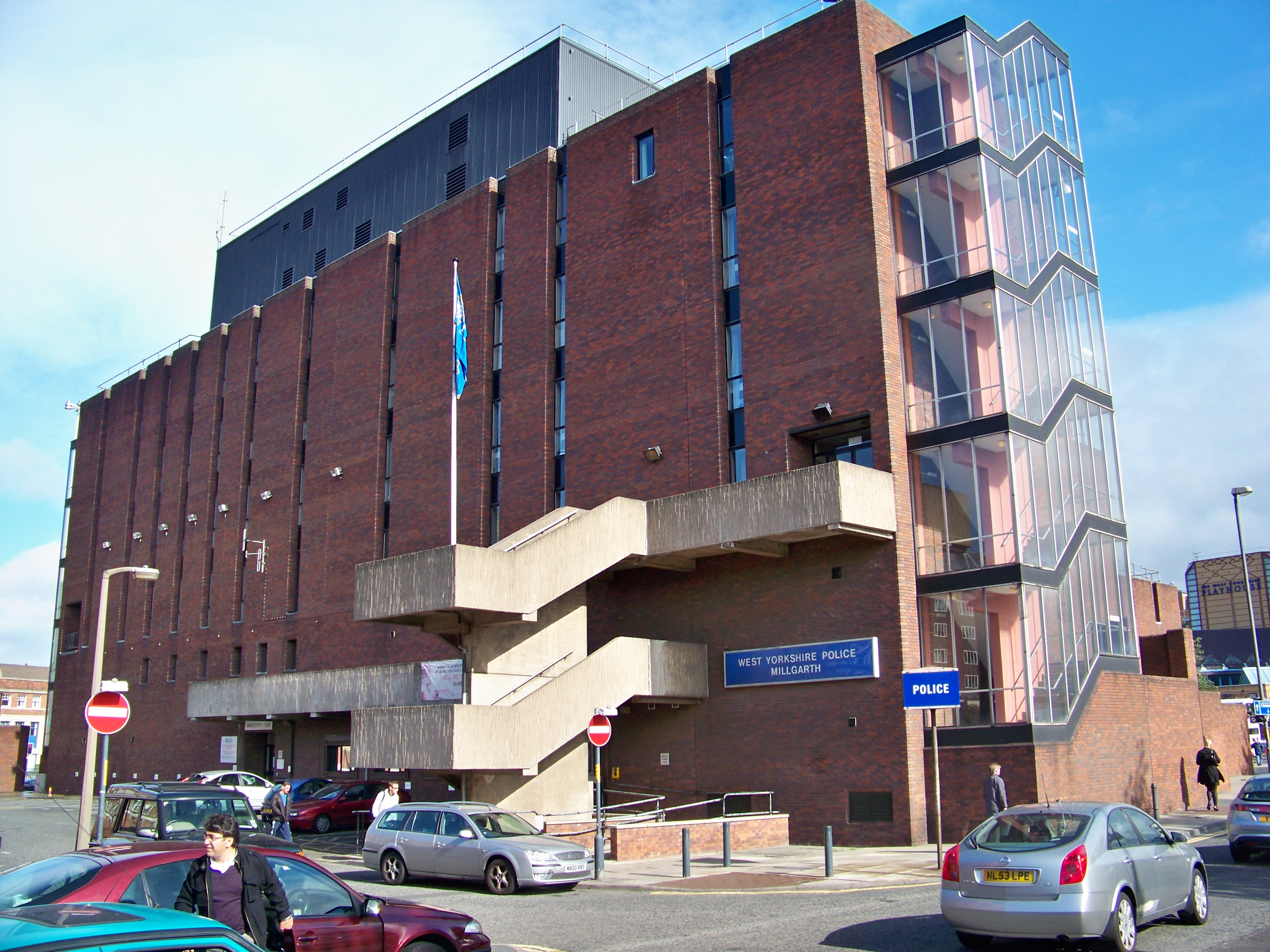
- Milgarth Police Station, Leeds
- Court: House of Lords
- Full case name: Hill (Administratrix of the Estate of Jacqueline Hill, deceased) v Chief Constable of West Yorkshire
- Decided: 28 April 1988
- Citations: [1987] UKHL 12 [1989] AC 53 [1988] 2 All ER 238 [1988] 2 WLR 1049

Court membership
- Judges sitting: Lord Keith of Kinkel; Lord Brandon of Oakbrook; Lord Templeman; Lord Oliver of Aylmerton; Lord Goff of Chieveley

Keywords
- Duty of care

Hill v Chief Constable of West Yorkshire [1987] UKHL 12, [1989] AC 53 was a judicial decision of the House of Lords in relation to the claim by the mother of Jacqueline Hill (one of the last victims of Peter Sutcliffe, the "Yorkshire Ripper") against West Yorkshire Police that their negligence in failing to apprehend the killer resulted in her daughter's death.

The House of Lords unanimously struck out the claim as disclosing no justiciable cause of action, upholding the decision of the judge at first instance and of the Court of Appeal. The claim was struck out on the alternative bases of (i) the police owed no specific duty of care to a member of the general public, and (ii) on public policy grounds.

== Facts ==
Between 1975 and 1980, Peter Sutcliffe killed 13 young women and attempted to kill seven others. His last victim, Jacqueline Hill, a 20-year-old student at Leeds University, was murdered in Leeds on 17 November 1980. Sutcliffe had been arrested for drunk-driving in April 1980. While awaiting trial for this, he killed two more women (including Hill) and attacked three others who survived. He was eventually arrested in January 1981.

In her claim, Ms Hill's mother pointed to extensive failings on the part of West Yorkshire Police in relation to its investigation of the murders, and in particular officers' fixation upon a message purportedly from the killer which was later shown to be a hoax. Police officers interviewed Sutcliffe as a suspect nine times during their investigation. A number of the same failings would be highlighted subsequently in the Byford Report. This included a letter sent by one Trevor Birdsall, a long-time associate of Sutcliffe, who stated that Sutcliffe had a fixation with prostitutes and that Birdsall had reason to believe he might be the killer. Although Birdsall's letter was sent after Hill's death, it was ignored for months, which was seen as symptomatic of the systemic failings of the investigation.

Because the application was made to strike out on the basis that there was no cause of action, the courts proceeded on the hypothetical assumption that these criticisms were all true, but without making any findings of fact in that regard. The Chief Constable was named as defendant in the action pursuant to section 48(1) of the Police Act 1964.

A different view from Tofaris and Steel where the duty to prevent harm will only occur when the defendants status creates the obligation to protect the claimant.

== Judgment ==
=== House of Lords ===
The lead decision was given by Lord Keith of Kinkel. After reviewing the background facts, Lord Keith reviewed the law, and noted that there was no question that a police officer may be liable in tort to a person who is injured as a direct result of their acts or omissions. He further noted that under the common law, police officers owe to the general public a duty to enforce the criminal law (R v Commissioner of Police of the Metropolis, Ex parte Blackburn [1968] 2 QB 118), enforceable by an action for mandamus. However, he went on to note, "a chief officer of police has a wide discretion as to the manner in which the duty is discharged. It is for him to decide how available resources should be deployed, whether particular lines of inquiry should or should not be followed and even whether or not certain crimes should be prosecuted." Accordingly, while a chief police officer has an obligation to enforce the law, there were no specific requirements as to the manner in which they must do so.

He then reviewed the position in relation to establishing a duty of care. He noted that it "has been said almost too frequently to require repetition that foreseeability of likely harm is not in itself a sufficient test of liability in negligence. Some further ingredient is invariably needed to establish the requisite proximity of relationship between plaintiff and defendant, and all the circumstances of the case must be carefully considered and analysed in order to ascertain whether such an ingredient is present." He then considered at length the decision in Home Office v Dorset Yacht Co Ltd [1970] UKHL 2, [1970] AC 1004. He noted that the two cases were similar, but held that no duty of care arose between West Yorkshire Police and Ms Hill. He held:

It is plain that vital characteristics which were present in the Dorset Yacht case and which led to the imposition of liability are here lacking. Sutcliffe was never in the custody of the police force. Miss Hill was one of a vast number of the female general public who might be at risk from his activities but was at no special distinctive risk in relation to them.

He went on to state:

That is sufficient for the disposal of the appeal. But in my opinion there is another reason why an action for damages in negligence should not lie against the police in circumstances such as those of the present case, and that is public policy.

He held that as a general matter of public policy, the police should not owe a duty to the public at large in tort to apprehend criminals expeditiously, for "the imposition of liability may lead to the exercise of a function being carried on in a detrimentally defensive frame of mind." Further, he was concerned about the time and manpower it would take for the police to defend such claims.

Lord Templeman gave a short concurring judgment. In his characteristic fashion, Lord Templeman opened with an emotional statement: "The appellant, Mrs. Hill, is tormented with the unshakeable belief that her daughter would be alive today if the respondent the West Yorkshire police force had been more efficient. That belief is entitled to respect and understanding. Damages cannot compensate for the brutal extinction of a young life." However, he too concurred that no duty of care arose. His judgment emphasised much more strongly the public policy element; he expressed concern that the court "would have to decide whether an inspector is to be condemned for failing to display the acumen of Sherlock Holmes and whether a constable is to be condemned for being as obtuse as Dr. Watson."

== Significance ==
The United Kingdom Supreme Court reviewed the decision in Robinson v Chief Constable of West Yorkshire Police [2018] UKSC 4, coincidentally also a claim against West Yorkshire Police. The court held that Hill did not confer generally immunity upon the police, only that a duty of care would not arise without special circumstances. Where the police themselves had created the danger, then they would have a duty of care. Commentators suggest that the later decisions "made significant inroads" into the general public policy exclusion in Hill.

== See also ==
- English tort law
- Warren v. District of Columbia
- Osman v United Kingdom
