= Brown v Heathcote County Council =

- Court: Court of Appeal of New Zealand
- Full case name: Michael Brown & Adrienne Ida Brown v The Chairman, Councillors and Inhabitants of Heathcote County (First Defendant), The Christchurch Drainage Board (Second Defendant)
- Decided: 19 June 1986
- Citation: 1986 1 NZLR 76
- Transcript: http://www.bailii.org/uk/cases/UKPC/1987/1987_28.pdf

Court membership
- Judges sitting: Cooke P, Richardson J, Richmond J

Keywords
- negligence

Brown v Heathcote County Council [1986] 1 NZLR 76 is a cited case in New Zealand regarding council liability for negligent inspection.

== Background ==
The Browns planned to build a new house on the family orchard, on the banks of the Heathcote River.

This river had a history of flooding, and the local council sought advice from the Christchurch Drainage Board about the suitability of the proposed building site, and they advised that elevating the building site by 9 inches would be adequate flood protection, and the council duly issued a building consent, subject to this condition.

The House was built and completed in 1974. However, the site was flooded in 1975, 1976 and 1977 and as a result of these repeated floodings, the Browns raised the elevation of the house by 6 feet, at the cost of $30,000.

After the council and the drainage board refused to reimburse them the $30,000, the Browns sued them in tort, winning damages in the High Court of $32,900.

== Held ==
The Court of Appeal ruled that the council was liable. This decision was later affirmed by the Privy Council.

Footnote: The Court of Appeal decided Brown v Heathcote County Council on the same day as Craig v East Coast Bays City Council and Stieller v Porirua City Council, which also involved negligent council building inspections.
