= Scott Group Ltd v McFarlane =

Civil court case in New Zealand

- Court: Court of Appeal of New Zealand
- Full case name: Scott Group Ltd v Gordon Munro McFarlane, George Hamish MacMorran & George Ewen Scott
- Decided: 18 November 1977
- Citation: [1978] 1 NZLR 553
- Transcript: Court of Appeal judgment

Court membership
- Judges sitting: Richardson P, Woodhouse J, Cooke J

Scott Group Ltd v McFarlane is a New Zealand case where it was held that an auditor was liable for damages for negligence to a 3rd party which later relied on the audit report.

== Background ==
G M McFarlane, a chartered accountant, audited the 1970 John Duthie Holdings Ltd financial statements, and through a simple mathematical error, resulted in John Duthie Holdings net worth being overstated by $38,000.

At the same time, Scott Group Limited were considering making a takeover offer, and after reading the audited reports in question, valued the company at over $1 million, and offered to take over the company on the basis of two shares for every one share.

However, just as the takeover was finalised, the mistake was discovered. As a result, Scott Group argued that it paid $38,000 too much for the shares, and sought compensation from the auditors for this amount.

The auditors in response denied any liability for this mistake, on the basis there was no contractual relationship between the auditors and the takeover company, and neither did they owe Scott Group a duty of care for the mistake.

== Decision ==
The Court of Appeal ruled that as J D Holdings financial position was so poor, it made a takeover by another company a strong possibility, and that as a result, the auditors owed Scott Group a duty of care. No money for damages was awarded, as the court ruled that it had not suffered any financial loss.

Whilst the financial statements were overstated by $38,000, evidence suggested that the shareholders of John Duthie Holdings were unlikely to have accepted any offer lower than the two for one share swap that was offered. Furthermore, the evidence on hand was that Scott Group paid $263,885 less than what the company was worth.

The auditor's disclaimer did not exclude liability to the general public, which Scott Group was, and presumably since this case, most auditors disclaimers now exclude liability to members of the public.
