= Voller Brothers =

British luthiers known for imitations of fine violins

The Voller Brothers, William (born in 1854), Alfred (born in 1856) and Charles (born in 1865), were craftsmen who worked in Streatham, London, from 1885 to 1927 and are known for their imitations of fine violins and the infamous "Balfour" Stradivarius.

Charles Beare commented, "The most ingenious copyists are acknowledged to be William, Charles and Alfred Voller. The brothers were all accomplished musicians whose acquaintances included such well known figures as Wilhelmj and Tertis as well as having business contacts in various parts of Europe. By 1892 they were working for George Hart in London and several of their early instruments bear his label. After setting up independently they embarked on numerous copies of lesser-known makers as well as the more obvious names that include some dangerously convincing imitations of the Gagliano family."

Today the Voller Brothers are known for their craftsmanship as well as their imitations of old Italian instruments.

== Background ==
The brothers, often referenced collectively as the Vollers, began in the London shop of George Hart and Son, "where they were tasked with creating copies of important instruments that passed through the firm, which were always clearly labeled as such."

"When the brothers set up their own shop in Notting Hill Gate, however, their work turned the corner from expert imitation to abject fraud, and with the aid of an unscrupulous dealer they managed to fool not only unsuspecting customers but some of the foremost experts on violin making. While William focused on the varnish, Alfred produced the scrolls and Charles made the body parts. As forgeries of well-known and documented instruments were too risky, the Vollers began to concentrate on slightly more obscure makers, especially Gagliano, with breathtaking results."

"The Voller brothers, who worked in England in the late 19th century, were legendary masters of craftiness and deceit - a nightmare," according to Philip Kass.

== Instruments ==
The Vollers made reproductions of Guarneri del Gesu. These include copies of the "d'Egville" of 1735 and several versions of the "Leduc" of 1743 whose originals had been brought to Britain by the collector David Laurie before passing through the hands of George Hart and in 1894, the Hills.

Among the Vollers' reproductions include many imitations that they accurately labelled. Their imitations are made from carefully matched wood slabs with attention to many characteristic features of works by the original maker. However, "The work is a little exaggerated, the edges broad and the cutting of the head not particularly well defined. But the significant elements are caught accurately."

Some copies of well-documented instruments should have been safe from fraudulent abuse, but controversy did arise over a Stradivari copy that became known as the 'Balfour' Stradivarius.

== The "Balfour" Stradivarius ==
"Balfour & Co. by 1901 had already set themselves up as violin experts but in fact were shipping, passenger, and commission agents with little knowledge of the violin world. They claim to have discovered a “Stradivari of 1692, the finest in the world for sale at £1,000.” The violin was originally sold by William Voller to Balfour for £45 with no attempt to defraud or mislabel and thus takes its name from the company that subsequently offered it for sale. Balfours’ exploited this ‘find’ in a remarkable way; certificates given with enthusiasm and florid descriptions were gathered from Silvestre-Maucotel, Gustav Bernardel, Nestor Audinot, C.A. Chanot, F.W. Chanot and the wholesale firm of Beare & Sons - George Hart, J & A Beare and W.E. Hill & Sons were conspicuous by their absence. These certificates with translations surround Balfour & Co.’s general guarantee document."

"After an unsuccessful attempt to sell it at Puttnick's (where it was bought in) it was sold privately for £2,500. This prompted an anonymous letter stating: "You know it is only a clever 'fake' and signed 'One who knows who made it.' Once the new owner of the 'Balfour' violin realized his mistake, civil court proceedings were instigated that resulted in an out-of-court settlement."

The construction of the Balfour Stradivarius had errors that eventually led to the Balfour’s being caught. "The purfling is ebony, an obvious sign that the violin could not be a genuine Stradivari. Another error which they perpetrated on this and most of their instruments is the short scarfed joint in the purfling on, or just beside, the centre joint at both ends of the back. Cremonese instruments generally have a longer overlapping mitre placed well away from the centre line. The typical Cremonese-style pins are present however, at each end of the back, half covered by the purfling itself. The only slight stylistic weaknesses in the violin in general are the same as are found in other Voller works. The scroll, although a beautiful piece of carving, just misses the lightness and accuracy of a Stradivari head of this period, and the edges are perhaps a little too evenly rounded off with sandpaper. The soundholes, too, are relatively weak, with very small nicks and slightly jagged knife-cut circles where Strad would have used a cylindrical cutter."

== Modern Reputation ==
In modern times the brothers have begun to be respected for the craftsmanship of their forgery. A revival of interest in their work is in evidence – as experts have weighed in and written about them. The British Violin Making Association has recently produced a book about the brothers. Owning a real Voller is now very much in vogue and their instruments are being sought by collectors and musicians alike, not only because of the former notoriety of these men, but because of what these instruments are – examples of the brothers craftsmanship and skill, leading the brothers to be compared to the work of leading violinmakers of the 19th century.

A passage about the brothers' work from the Universal Dictionary of Violim & Bow Makers reads: "Perfect replicas of any model, exhibiting with matchless exactitude the skill and imagination of the renowned Vuillaume. Appearance of wear and age marvelously accomplished. Superior in every way...Smallest details perfectly represented and very skillfully finished. Instruments splendidly desirable as regards the picturesque, and certainly adequate for all requirements of first-class players...Finest wood carefully selected for its acoustic properties.”

== Biography ==
- John Dilworth, Andrew Fairfax & John Milnes. The Voller Brothers: Victorian Violin Makers. British Violin Making Association. ISBN 978-0954970215.
