= Balfour v Attorney-General =

Balfour v A-G
- Court: Court of Appeal of New Zealand
- Full case name: David Neil Balfour v A-G
- Decided: 12 October 1991
- Citation: [1991] 1 NZLR 519
- Transcript: High Court judgment

Court membership
- Judges sitting: Richardson J, Casey J, Hardie Boys J

Keywords
- defamation, causation

Balfour v A-G [1991] 1 NZLR 519 is a leading case in New Zealand involving negligence in tort for defamation, as well as causation.

== Background ==
Balfour was a primary teacher in the Hawkes Bay, and in 1976 he transferred to secondary teaching. In order for him to be able to continue to teach at a secondary level, he needed his teaching grade to be changed from List A, to List B.

Unfortunately, he was only graded as List A2. Nor was he helped by the fact that in 1976, the Education Department started annual mandatory background checks on teachers, which the following note was put on his teaching records:

"Entirely unsuitable - would be List A3 [a slightly derogatory grading] teacher if returned to state system - a long practising and latent homosexual".

Soon thereafter, he was forced to resign his teaching position, and was also given a ban from teaching by the Hawkes Bay Secondary Schools district. which was subsequently reversed.

In the meantime, he had obtained employment in the private school sector, where apparently there were no background checks.

Things came a to head in 1980 and 1981 when Balfour was unsuccessful in applying for training courses for working with special needs children, which he argued was as a result of this file note.

He claimed $150,000 in general and exemplary damages for defamation

== Held ==
The Court of Appeal ruled that there was no causation linking the ministry to his loss. Factors included that there was no record of the note being given to other parties, and even if this information was passed on, there was no proof that he was disadvantaged by these comments, as it was pointed out, that by the time of the trial in 1986, he had successfully obtained a teaching job in a public school as well as obtaining a List B grading. It was also said that being not selected had more to do with there being 66 candidates for only 20 positions.

FOOTNOTE: Balfour subsequently gained attention for him and his wife Daryl being convicted of animal cruelty charges, getting a 20-year ban from owning either cats or dogs.
