= Dorset Yacht Co Ltd v Home Office =

1970 English tort law case

Home Office v Dorset Yacht Co Ltd
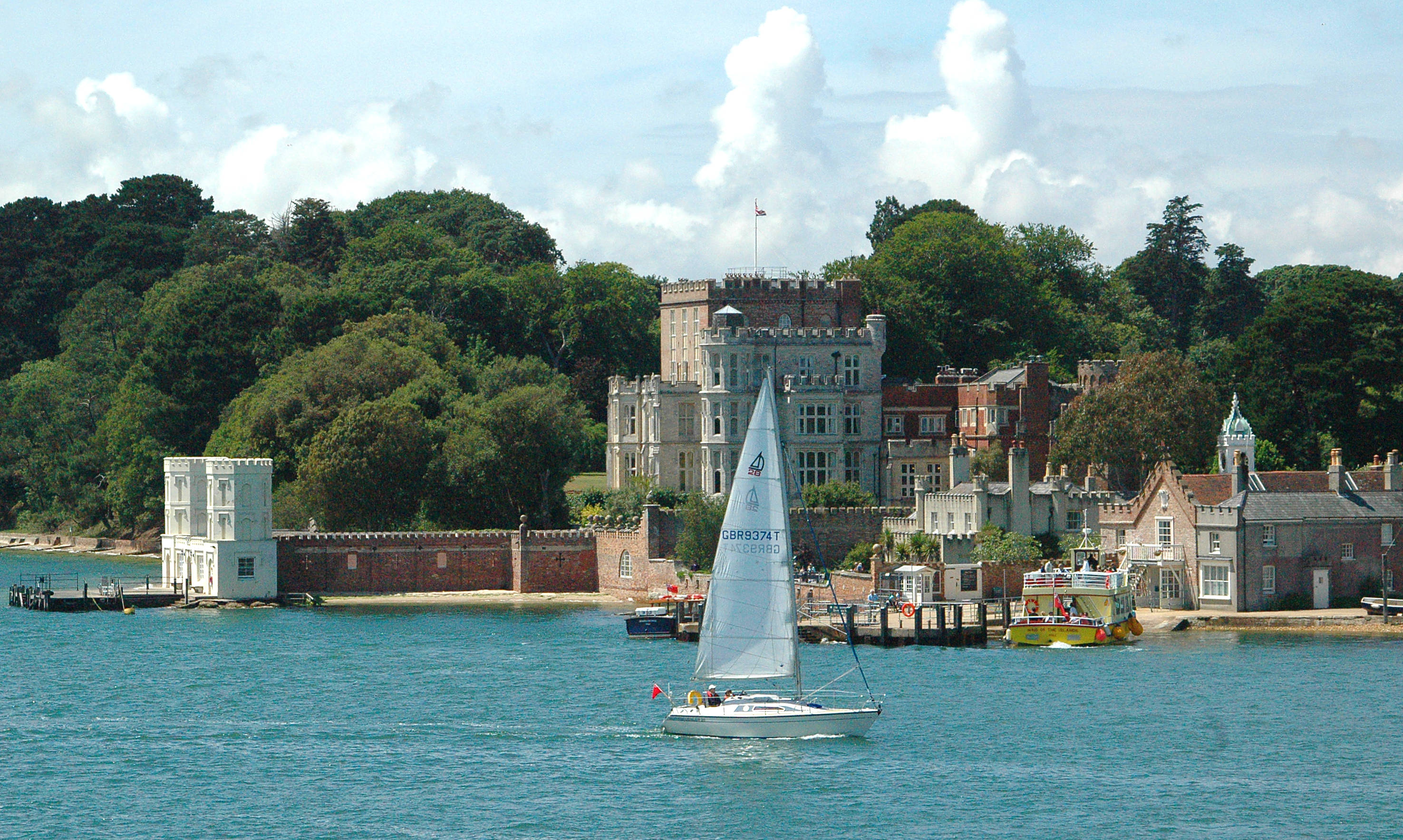
- Court: House of Lords
- Decided: 6 May 1970
- Citation: [1970] 2 All ER 294, [1970] AC 1004, [1970] UKHL 2

Case history
- Prior action: [1969] 2 QB 426

Court membership
- Judges sitting: Lord Reid, Lord Morris, Viscount Dilhorne, Lord Pearson, Lord Diplock

Home Office v Dorset Yacht Co Ltd [1970] UKHL 2, [1970] AC 1004 is a leading case in English tort law. It is a House of Lords decision on negligence and marked the start of a rapid expansion in the scope of negligence in the United Kingdom by widening the circumstances in which a court was likely to find a duty of care. The case also addressed the liability of government bodies, a person's liability for the acts of third parties that he has facilitated, and liability for omissions.

== Facts ==
On 21 September 1962, ten borstal trainees were working on Brownsea Island in Poole Harbour under the control of three officers employed by the Home Office. Seven trainees escaped one night, at the time the officers had retired to bed leaving the trainees to their own devices. The seven trainees who escaped boarded a yacht and collided with another yacht, the property of the respondents, and damaged it. The owners of the yacht sued the Home Office for negligence for damages.

A preliminary issue was ordered to be tried on whether the officers or the Home Office owed a duty of care to the claimants (plaintiffs, before the Civil Procedure Rules of 1999) capable of giving rise to liability in damages. It was admitted that the Home Office would be vicariously liable if an action would lie against any of the officers. The preliminary hearing found for the Dorset Yacht Co. that there was, in law, a duty of care and that the case could go forward for trial on its facts. The Home Office appealed to the House of Lords. The Home Office argued that it could owe no duty of care as there was no precedent for any duty on similar facts. Further, it was argued that there could be no liability for the actions of a third party and that the Home Office should be immune from legal action owing to the public nature of its duties.

== Judgment ==
=== Court of Appeal ===
Lord Denning MR held that the Home Office should be liable for the damage on grounds of public policy. He stated,

What then is the right policy for the judges to adopt? On whom should the risk of negligence fall? Up till now it has fallen on the innocent victim. Many, many a time has a prisoner escaped - or been let out on parole - and done damage. But there is never a case in our law books when the prison authorities have been liable for it. No householder who has been burgled, no person who has been wounded by a criminal, has ever recovered damages from the prison authorities; such as to find a place in the reports. The householder has claimed on his insurance company. The injured man can now claim on the compensation fund. None has claimed against the prison authorities. Should we alter all this: I should be reluctant to do so if, by so doing, we should hamper all the good work being done by our prison authorities... I can see the force of this argument. But I do not think it should prevail. I think that the officers of Borstal institutions should be liable for negligence.

Dorset Yacht Co Ltd v Home Office, Q.B (CA 1969).

=== House of Lords ===
The highest court held 4–1 likewise. Lord Reid held,

...the well-known passage in Lord Atkin's speech should I think be regarded as a statement of principle. It is not to be treated as if it were a statutory definition. It will require qualification in new circumstances. But I think that the time has come when we can and should say that it ought to apply unless there is some justification or valid explanation for its exclusion.

Viscount Dilhorne gave a dissenting judgment.

== Significance ==
The case is perhaps relevant not only for its clear elucidation of the 1930s-established Atkinian notion of neighbourhood (a proximity or sufficient nexus) but also for its expression of a thoroughly incrementalist approach to the development of the duty of care.

== See also ==
- English tort law
