= Spencer v Wincanton Holdings Ltd =

2009 English tort law case

- Court: Court of Appeal
- Decided: 26 November 2009
- Citation: [2009] EWCA Civ 1404

Keywords
- Causation

Spencer v Wincanton Holdings Ltd [2009] EWCA Civ 1404 is an English tort law case, concerning causation between a breach of duty and damage.

== Facts ==
The defendant's negligence at the workplace led to claimant's leg being amputated. Years later, the claimant was filling his car with petrol at Sainsbury's, and tripped over, suffering injury, and later confining him to a wheelchair. He had a prosthesis and walking sticks but did not use them, because he could not use them while driving. Spencer had made a claim for the first accident, but damages were being assessed after the second accident. Wincanton argued they should not be liable for the increase in damages from the second accident. Judge found defendant liable for the increase in damages caused by the second accident, subject to reduction of one third of damages for contributory negligence by the claimant. Wincanton appealed, arguing that McKew applied, and the claimant had been unreasonable enough to negate the right to increase in damages.

== Judgment ==
The Court of Appeal upheld the judge, and declined to follow McKew v Holland & Hannan & Cubitts (Scotland) Ltd in this case.

Aikens LJ accepted there was 'inevitably' a tension between McKew unreasonableness (breaking causal link) and unreasonableness that went to contributory negligence.

Sedley LJ said 'unreasonableness' covers a range of conduct from irrationality to simple incaution or unwisdom. Only where unreasonable conduct is very high in degree will McKew apply. But it was unhelpful to describe the later conduct required by the test as reckless or deliberate.

== See also ==
- English tort law
