= Stovin v Wise =

UK legal case

- Court: House of Lords
- Full case name: Stovin v Wise (Norfolk County Council, third party)
- Decided: 24 July 1996
- Citations: [1996] UKHL 15; [1996] AC 923; [1996] 3 All ER 801

Case history
- Appealed from: Court of Appeal

Court membership
- Judges sitting: Lord Goff; Lord Jauncey; Lord Slynn; Lord Nicholls; Lord Hoffmann

Keywords
- Delict; Duty of care; Negligence; Personal injury; Omissions liability; Administrative liability; Tort

Stovin v Wise [1996] UKHL 15 is an English tort law case about a highway authority's liability in negligence. The majority speech of Lord Hoffmann contains important principles about omissions liability and the liability of public authorities.

== Background ==
Ms Wise was turning right at an acute intersection in Wymondham. Her view was obscured by an earthen bank, which the Norfolk County Council's highway authority had earmarked for removal but since neglected. Ms Wise pulled into the road as Mr Stovin was approaching at speed on his motorbike. Unable to slow down in time, he crashed into Ms Wise's vehicle.

Mr Stovin successfully sued Ms Wise in negligence. The High Court held her 70% to blame for the accident and the Council 30%. The question on appeal was solely whether the Council could indeed be liable. The Court of Appeal of England and Wales held that it was.

== Decision ==
The House of Lords upheld the Council's appeal by finding that no duty of care requiring it to remove the earthen bank existed. Lord Hoffmann wrote the majority opinion (with Lords Goff and Jauncey concurring). Lord Nicholls dissented (with Lord Slynn concurring).

== Legacy ==
Stovin v Wise is a decision of major significance in the development of negligence liability in English law. It deals with both the liability of state defendants and liability for omissions and exemplifies and helped to establish English law's conservative attitude to both.
