= Latimer v AEC Ltd =

- Court: House of Lords
- Citation: [1953] AC 643

Latimer v AEC Ltd [1953] AC 643 is an English tort law case, concerning the breach of a duty of care.

== Facts ==
A rain storm flooded a factory and a ‘mystic’ chemical mix made everything slippery. The employer did not put enough sawdust down. The plaintiff slipped and fell where there was no sawdust.

First instance allowed the claim. The Court of Appeal reversed this and held a breach of duty had not been established.

== Judgment ==
The House of Lords held claim under the Factories Act 1937 failed, and the plaintiff also failed in negligence. They rejected that the works should be shut down because this did not appear in the initial pleadings, and only at a late stage in the trial after all the evidence had been introduced.

Lord Porter said nobody else slipped. It would be ‘drastic’ to shut down the works. The trial judge did not show what a reasonable man would have done.

Lord Tucker said ‘the courts should be vigilant to see that the common law duty owed by a master to his servants should not be gradually enlarged until it is barely distinguishable from his absolute statutory obligations.’

Lord Asquith, Lord Oaksey and Lord Reid agreed.

== See also ==
- English tort law
