= Michael v Chief Constable of South Wales Police =

English tort law case

Michael v CC of South Wales Police
- Court: UK Supreme Court
- Citation: [2015] UKSC 2, [2015] AC 1732

Michael v Chief Constable of South Wales Police [2015] UKSC 2 is an English tort law case, concerning the duty of care and the Human Rights Act 1998.

== Facts ==
The estate and dependants of a young woman, Joana Michael, claimed the police were negligent, after she called 999 shortly before she was murdered by a former partner, and the police responded slowly. Michael lived in Cardiff with two children, age 7 and 10 months. The station was 5 minutes away, but the person on the end of the call did not tell the police of the threat to kill, and the police assigned the case to respond within 60 minutes. She was stabbed many times. Police applied for the claim to be struck out.

The Judge dismissed the application. The Court of Appeal reversed the decision, granting summary judgment in the negligence claim, but allowing the Human Rights Act 1998 claim to continue to a full trial, because there was enough evidence of a real and immediate risk to life to warrant it.

== Judgment ==
Lord Toulson (Lord Neuberger, Mance, Reed and Hodge agreeing) held there was no duty of care in tort for actions by third parties. However, a claim under the Human Rights Act 1998 and the European Convention on Human Rights article 2 could proceed, as a potential violation of the right to life.

Lord Kerr and Lady Hale dissented, saying the police have a duty where there is an imminent threat to life.

== See also ==
- English tort law
