= Rees v Darlington Memorial Hospital =

English tort law case

- Court: House of Lords
- Citation: [2003] UKHL 52

Rees v Darlington Memorial Hospital [2003] UKHL 52 is an English tort law case, concerning wrongful conceptions and the scope of the duty of care.

== Facts ==
The claimant Rees suffered a condition causing blindness, making her worry about her ability to look after a child. Consequently, she underwent sterilisation, which failed. She gave birth to a healthy child, and the respondents accepted liability for negligence. The Court of Appeal allowed recovery of additional costs of raising a healthy child attributable to the disability of its mother (in a wrongful birth or wrongful conception action).

== Judgment ==
The House of Lords reversed the Court of Appeal and rejected the claim by a four to three majority. The majority held that where negligence resulted in the birth of an unplanned child, a fixed sum award of £15,000 should be made (to parents jointly it seemed) to compensate with the interference with their autonomy caused by having an unplanned child.

In obiter dicta, three members doubted that Parkinson v St James and Seacroft University Hospital NHS Trust was correct, that the additional costs of rearing a child born with disabilities were recoverable. A final member of the majority agreed with the minority (seemingly) that the additional costs attributable to the child's disability should be re overable. Another member of the majority said it was arguable that costs from child's disability should be recoverable where the purpose of the procedure that was negligent was to prevent the birth of a disabled child.

The minority expressed grave concern about use of a conventional award of this kind, since the precise nature and purpose of the award is contested.

== See also ==
- English tort law
