= Morris v Murray =

- Court: Court of Appeal
- Citation: [1991] 2 QB 6

Morris v Murray [1991] 2 QB 6 is an English tort law case, concerning breach of duty.

== Facts ==
The defendant had a pilot licence. He drank 17 whiskeys with the plaintiff in pubs. Then he said ‘let’s go flying’ in wet and slippery conditions. They crashed. The defendant was killed, and the plaintiff sued the defendant's estate.

Asquith J rejected the volenti defence, but reduced damages by 20% for contributory negligence.

== Judgment ==
Fox LJ cited Asquith J, that there are cases where getting into a plane or car with a drunk is like ‘intermeddling with an unexploded bomb or walking the edge of an unfenced cliff’. The passenger could not think ‘Mr Murray, who had been drinking all the afternoon, was capable of discharging a normal duty of care.’ Morris was ‘merry’.

For Stocker LJ the risk in the plane ‘is far greater than driving a car in a similar condition of insobriety’. The plaintiff ‘actively sought’ the ‘joyride in the aircraft’. He was engaged in an ‘intrinsically and obviously dangerous occupation.’

== See also ==
- English tort law
