= Sutradhar v Natural Environment Research Council =

- Court: House of Lords
- Citation: [2006] UKHL 33

Sutradhar v Natural Environment Research Council [2006] UKHL 33 is an English tort law case, concerning whether a duty of care could be owed by making statements on drinking water safety.

== Facts ==
The UK government commissioned the British Geological Survey to test the performance of deep irrigation wells in Bangladesh. Tests could identify toxins in the water, but not arsenic. Defendant did not consider arsenic at the time. But arsenic did contaminate the drinking water and caused a major environmental disaster. Between 35 million and 77 million of the country's (then) 125 million people were put at risk. Sutradhur had symptoms of arsenic poisoning after drinking froim an irrigation well that BGS had tested, and claimed damaged that BGS breached its positive duty to test for arsenic.

In the Court of Appeal, Kennedy LJ, [24] said it was ‘aburd’ to think that BGS had assumed responsibility to Bangladeshi people for safety of water.

== Judgment ==
The House of Lords struck out the claim, and held the authors of a report on water quality in Bangladesh had not owed a duty of care regarding physical injury caused by errors in the report to large sections of the population. Lord Hoffmann said claim was ‘hopeless’, and continued:

27. ... the fact that one has expert knowledge does not in itself create a duty to the whole world to apply that knowledge in solving its problems... BGS therefore owed no positive duties to the government or people of Bangladesh to do anything. They can be liable only for the things they did... not for what they did not do.

There was also no claim for negligent misrepresentation.

== See also ==
- English tort law
