= D v East Berkshire Community Health NHS Trust =

D v East Berkshire Health Community NHS Trust
- Court: House of Lords
- Citation: [2005] UKHL 23

Case history
- Prior action: [2003] EWCA Civ 1151

D v East Berkshire Health Community NHS Trust [2005] UKHL 23 is an English tort law case, concerning a duty of care in the case of suspected (but non-existent) child abuse.

== Facts ==
Claimants said East Berkshire Health Community NHS doctors and social workers were negligent in deciding the claimants had abused their children. They argued the duty concept was inappropriate to decide whether liability could arise, and the relevant considerations were whether there was a breach of duty. The children in fact had skin disorders, they were not beaten, but they were removed from parents by social workers.

Lord Phillips MR held that the children could claim under ECHR article 8(1), but parents could not because there would potentially be a conflict of duty between parents and the safety of children.

== Judgment ==
The House of Lords confirmed the Court of Appeal's ruling that parents could not claim (though children could) and this approach pursued a legitimate aim and was necessary in pursuit of the European Convention on Human Rights, article 8(2).

Lord Bingham said the following:

49. ... the concept of duty has proved itself a somewhat blunt instrument for dividing claims which ought reasonably to lead to recovery from claims which ought not.

Lord Rodger said the following:

100. ...the world is full of harm for which the law furnishes no remedy. For instance, a trader owes no duty of care to avoid injuring his rivals by destroying their long-established businesses. If he does so and, as a result, one of his competitors descends into a clinical depression and his family are reduced to penury, in the eyes of the law they suffer no wrong and the law will provide no redress - because competition is regarded as operating to the overall good of the economy and society... 101. ... the policy of the law is to concentrate on compensating the victim for the effects of his injuries while doing little or nothing for the others.

== See also ==
- English tort law
