= Weir v Secretary of State for Transport =

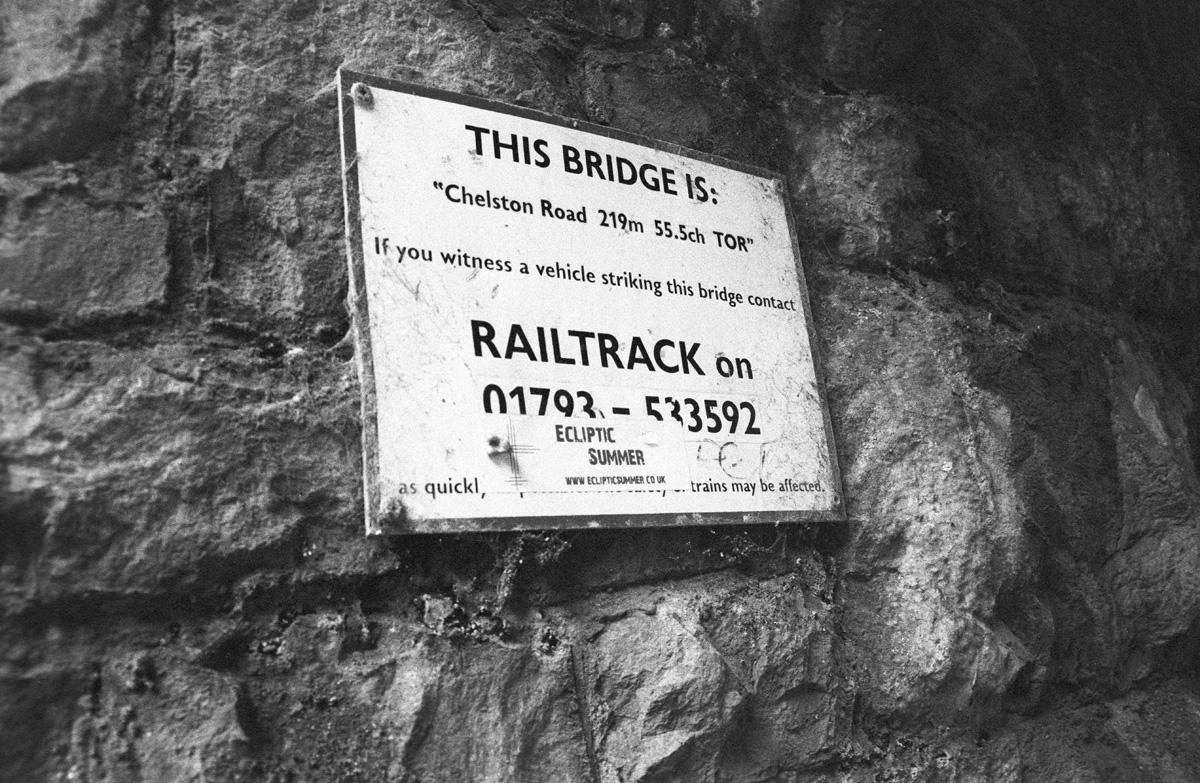
- Court: High Court
- Citation: [2005] EWHC 2192 (Ch)

Keywords
- Rail

Weir v Secretary of State for Transport [2005] EWHC 2192 (Ch) is a UK enterprise law case, concerning railways in the UK. The High Court ruled on the interpretation of Network Rail's statutory duties regarding bridge maintenance, particularly examining whether these constituted an "absolute obligation" or were subject to reasonable practicability. The judgment clarified the liability framework for railway infrastructure failures, influencing subsequent cases on transport operators' statutory duties.

== Facts ==
Weir and 48,000 other shareholders of Railtrack claimed that Stephen Byers’ decision to force Railtrack into administration amounted to the tort of misfeasance in public office and a breach of the Human Rights Act 1998, based upon the theory that their property had been deprived. The shareholders collectively managed to raise £4m together to fight the case. They argued their property was expropriated without adequate compensation.

== Judgment ==
Lindsay J rejected the claims.

== See also ==
- United Kingdom enterprise law
