= Reeves v Metropolitan Police Commissioner =

- Court: House of Lords
- Citation: [2000] 1 AC 360

Reeves v Metropolitan Police Commissioner [2000] 1 AC 360 is an English tort law case, concerning breach of duty.

== Facts ==
A prisoner killed himself while on suicide watch.

== Judgment ==
The House of Lords held that the police have a duty to prevent the death of prisoners under their care, including deaths by suicide. Lord Hoffmann said: ‘Once it is admitted that this is the rare case in which such a duty is owed, it seems to me self-contradictory to say that the breach could not have been a cause of the harm because the victim caused it to himself.’

Lord Hobhouse dissented saying the voluntary act of suicide is an exception. He pointed to the example of a political prisoner who does it to make a statement.

== See also ==
- English tort law
