= Allied Maples v Simmons & Simmons =

- Court: Court of Appeal
- Citation: [1995] 1 WLR 1602

Allied Maples v Simmons & Simmons [1995] 1 WLR 1602 is an English tort law case, concerning causation, and loss of a chance being allowed for a profit claim.

== Facts ==
Allied Maples sued solicitors for failing to advise against deleting a warranty in a business sale agreement. This meant the plaintiff lost protection from contingent liabilities of the third party in the business sale. Simmons & Simmons argued that it could not be shown the third party would have accepted a warranty, so their negligence did not cause the loss on the balance of probabilities.

== Judgment ==
Stuart-Smith LJ held it was not necessary to show that on the balance of probability the third party would have accepted the warranty. It was enough that a ‘substantial’ chance was lost. Compensation was apt for that loss.

== See also ==
- English tort law
