= Intervening cause =

Tort law term

In tort law, an intervening cause is an event that occurs after a tortfeasor's initial act of negligence and causes injury/harm to a victim. An intervening cause will generally absolve the tortfeasor of liability for the victim's injury only if the event is deemed a superseding cause. A superseding cause is an unforeseeable intervening cause. By contrast, a foreseeable intervening cause typically does not break the chain of causality, meaning that the tortfeasor is still responsible for the victim's injury—unless the event leads to an unforeseeable result.

For example (as in the US case of Watson v. Kentucky & Indiana Bridge & Railroad Co.), if a defendant had carelessly spilled gasoline near a pile of cigarette butts in an alley behind a bar, the fact that a bar patron later carelessly threw a cigarette butt into the gasoline would be deemed a foreseeable intervening cause, and would not absolve the defendant of tort liability. However, if the bar patron intentionally threw the cigarette butt into the gasoline because he wanted to see it ignite, this intentional act would likely be deemed unforeseeable, and therefore superseding.

In order for the intervening cause to be deemed superseding and relieve the tortfeasor of liability, both the act/event and the injury must be unforeseeable. For example, assume that contractor A was responsible for fencing or marking a hole in the ground and negligently fails to do so while contractor B is working in the hole. Then, a driver—who negligently failed to take his medication before driving and therefore does not see clearly—drives into the unmarked hole and injures contractor B. Contractor A will still be liable for the damage to contractor B despite the driver's negligence in not taking medication. This is because, even though the negligent act of the driver is not foreseeable, the fact of injury by a driver is foreseeable (i.e., a car falling in because there is no guard).

== See also ==
- Proximate cause
- Re Polemis & Furness, Withy & Co Ltd
