= Doughty v Turner Manufacturing =

English court case on law of negligence

Doughty v Turner Manufacturing is a 1964 English case on the law of negligence.

The case is notable for failing to apply the concept of "foreseeable class of harm" established in Hughes v Lord Advocate, thereby denying the award of damages to a factory worker injured in an accident at work.

== Facts ==
A factory worker who was lowering a lid with an asbestos-cement lining onto a cauldron of hot acidic liquid accidentally knocked the lid into the liquid. Shortly afterwards a "violent eruption" occurred, causing serious burns to the claimant who was standing some distance away. Unknown to anyone, the asbestos-cement lining was saturated with moisture from atmospheric water-vapour, and the accident occurred when water in the lid turned to steam and "erupted".

== Held ==
Applying the dictum in The Wagon Mound No. 1, the court denied the claimant a remedy, saying the injury was "too remote". Whilst it was foreseeable that a person standing nearby might be injured by "splashing", it was not foreseeable that an "eruption" might occur and injure a person outside the zone of splashing risk. The claimant argued that the concept of "class of harm" (as propounded in Hughes v Lord Advocate) should apply, namely, that although the eruption was not itself foreseeable, splashing was foreseeable, and that an "eruption" fell into the same class of harm as a "splashing". The court disagreed, saying that a splashing was a physical displacement, whereas an eruption was a chemical reaction which was NOT in the same class of harm.

While the court may have been anxious not to revert to the strict liability approach of Re Polemis in 1921, the immediate consequence of this case is that an innocent claimant injured at work had no redress against his employer, even though:

- any employer is normally vicariously liable for "the torts committed by his employees acting in the course and scope of their employment",
- the employer had third-part liability insurance who could afford to pay,
- the employer had a common law and statutory duty to provide a safe place of work.

== See also ==
- English tort law
- Negligence per se
- Palsgraf v. Long Island Railroad Co.
- Wright, Re Polemis, 14 Mod. L. Rev. 393 (Oct. 1951) – article by counsel in the case, "summarising the history of the doctrine . . . and the conflicting points of view."
