= Mansfield v Weetabix Ltd =

- Court: Court of Appeal
- Citation: [1998] 1 WLR 1263

Mansfield v Weetabix Ltd [1998] 1 WLR 1263 is an English tort law case, concerning breach of the duty of care.

== Facts ==
The plaintiffs owned a shop damaged by a lorry owned by Weetabix Ltd, driven by Mr Tarleton. Mr Tarleton did not know he was in a hypoglycaemic state, so that his brain was starved of oxygen and unable to function properly. Tarleton had died by time of trial.

Trial judge found Tarleton was negligent, and so his employers had to compensate the owner of the damaged shop.

== Judgment ==
Leggatt LJ allowed the appeal, holding there was no breach of the duty of care.

There is no reason in principle why a driver should not escape liability where the disabling even is not sudden, but gradual, provided that the driver is unaware of it.... To apply an objective standard in a way that did not take account of Mr Tarleton’s condition would be to impose strict liability. But that is not the law.... since in my judgment Mr Tarleton was in no way to blame, he was not negligent.

Aldous LJ said the following.

The standard of care that Mr Tarleton was obliged to show was that which is expected of a reasonably competent driver. He did not know and could not reasonably have known of his infirmity which was the cause of the accident. Therefore he was not at fault. His action did not fall below the standard of care required.

Sir Patrick Russell agreed.

== See also ==
- English tort law
