= Malfeasance in office =

Legal term for abuse of the power of an office

Malfeasance in office, also known as misconduct in public office, is any unlawful conduct that is often grounds for a just cause removal of an elected official by statute or recall election, or additionally a crime in some jurisdictions. Malfeasance in office contrasts with "misfeasance in office", which is the commission of a lawful act, done in an official capacity, that improperly causes harm; and "nonfeasance in office", which is the failure to perform an official duty.

An exact definition of malfeasance in office is difficult: many highly regarded secondary sources (such as books and commentaries) compete over its established elements based on reported cases. This confusion has arisen from the courts where no single consensus definition has arisen from the relatively few reported appeal-level cases involving malfeasance in office.

== England and Wales ==
Under English law, misconduct in public office is a criminal offence at common law that dates back to the 13th century.

The offence carries a maximum penalty of life imprisonment. It is confined to those who are public office holders, and is committed when the office holder acts (or neglects to act) in a way that constitutes a breach of the duties of that office. Case law has established a broad definition of "public office holder" for this purpose that does not depend on the person holding a formal "office" as such, nor on being paid out of the public purse, though a government employee is more likely to be found to fall into the definition.

The Crown Prosecution Service guidelines on this offence set out the components of the offence as summarised by the Court of Appeal:

1. a public officer acting as such
2. wilfully neglects to perform their duty and/or wilfully misconducts themselves
3. to such a degree as to amount to an abuse of the public's trust in the office holder (Note: In the decision not to prosecute Damian Green for misconduct by leaking information, Keir Starmer, the Director of Public Prosecutions, formulated this as "the breach must have been such a serious departure from acceptable standards as to constitute a criminal offence; and to such a degree as to amount to an abuse of the public's trust in the public official"; citing the Court of Appeal in the case of Attorney General's Reference No. 3 of 2003 [2004] EWCA Crim 868.)
4. without reasonable excuse or justification.

Those deemed public officers include civil servants, magistrates, judges, elected politicians (such as MPs and councillors), prison staff, police officers (including police community support officers and some police staff), but not (according to a 2014 case) NHS staff such as paramedics or ambulance staff. Someone can be acting as a public officer even if their employer is a private company delivering a public service. The public officer must be "acting as such"—the power they are misusing must arise from their public office.

A similar statutory offence exists under section 26 of the Criminal Justice and Courts Act 2015 for those who improperly or corruptly use the powers or privileges they have as police officers.

The similarly-named misfeasance in public office is a tort. In the House of Lords judgement in the BCCI case, it was held that this had three essential elements:

1. The defendant must be a public officer;
2. The defendant must have been exercising his power as a public officer;
3. The defendant is either exercising targeted malice or exceeding his powers.

=== Potential reform ===
In December 2020, the Law Commission issued a report recommending the common law offence of misconduct in public office be abolished, and replaced with two new statutory offences; one of 'corruption in public office' and another of 'breach of duty in public office'. As of 2024, the government has not issued a response to the report. The Public Office (Accountability) Bill 2024–26, given first reading in the Commons on 16 September 2025, will, if passed, abolish the common law offence and replace it with two statutory offences of "seriously improper acts" and "failing to prevent death or serious injury". The bill has not been passed as of 19 February 2026, when Andrew Mountbatten-Windsor, the former Prince Andrew, was arrested for misconduct in public office, the first royal family figure to be arrested under that offence in the modern age.

No such offence exists in Scots law. Craig Naylor, HM Chief Inspector of Constabulary in Scotland, called in 2024 for the creation of such an offence to bring accountability to Scottish police.

== United States ==
The West Virginia Supreme Court of Appeals summarized a number of the definitions of malfeasance in office applied by various appellate courts in the United States.

Malfeasance has been defined by appellate courts in other jurisdictions as a wrongful act which the actor has no legal right to do; as any wrongful conduct which affects, interrupts or interferes with the performance of official duty; as an act for which there is no authority or warrant of law; as an act which a person ought not to do; as an act which is wholly wrongful and unlawful; as that which an officer has no authority to do and is positively wrong or unlawful; and as the unjust performance of some act which the party performing it has no right, or has contracted not, to do.

— Daugherty v. Ellis, 142 W. Va. 340, 357-8, 97 S.E.2d 33, 42-3 (W. Va. 1956) (internal citations omitted).

The court then went on to use yet another definition, "malfeasance is the doing of an act which an officer had no legal right to do at all and that when an officer, through ignorance, inattention, or malice, does that which they have no legal right to do at all, or acts without any authority whatsoever, or exceeds, ignores, or abuses their powers, they are guilty of malfeasance."

Nevertheless, a few "elements" can be distilled from those cases. First, malfeasance in office requires an affirmative act or omission. Second, the act must have been done in an official capacity—under the color of office. Finally, that that act somehow interferes with the performance of official duties—though some debate remains about "whose official" duties.

In addition, jurisdictions differ greatly over whether intent or knowledge is necessary. As noted above, many courts will find malfeasance in office where there is "ignorance, inattention, or malice", which implies no intent or knowledge is required.

== Greece ==
Pursuant to Article 259 of the Greek Penal Code, the offense is punishable by imprisonment of up to two years or a fine. The legislator considers that the intent of the crime is to procure a benefit for the perpetrator, resulting in harm to the State or another person.

== See also ==
- Abuse of power
- Graft
- Misfeasance
- Political corruption
- State liability
