= Kent v Griffiths =

English Legal case about Duty of Care

Kent v Griffiths [2000] 2 All ER 474 is an English tort law case from the Court of Appeal concerning negligence, particularly the duty of care owed by the emergency services; particularly the ambulance service. The emergency services do not generally owe a duty of care to the public except in certain, limited circumstances (Hill v Chief Constable of West Yorkshire [1989] AC 53 (HL).

== Case ==
The claimant brought two simultaneous claims in negligence. The first, which was quickly dismissed, against her doctor, and the second, much more significant case against the London Ambulance Service after an ambulance, ordered by the doctor through a 999 call, took forty minutes to arrive at her house, where she was suffering a severe asthma attack, resulting in the claimant suffering respiratory arrest. In negligence cases, the claimant must prove that the defendant owed them a duty of care, that this duty was breached and that the injuries for which the claimant is seeking damages were a consequence of this breach. The issue before the court was whether an ambulance service (following the cases of Alexandrou v. Oxford, Oll v Secretary of State for Transport and Capital and Counties plc v. Hampshire County Council, which held that the police, Her Majesty's Coastguard and firefighters respectively did not) owe a duty of care to those relying on its services.

== Judgment ==
The claimant won in the first instance and the LAS appealed, whereupon the Court of Appeal held:

- It was 'reasonably foreseeable' that the claimant would suffer further illness if an ambulance did not arrive promptly
- The claimant and defendant were 'sufficiently proximate' once the LAS accepted the call and dispatched an ambulance, and a specific duty of care was established; there being no good reason for it failing to arrive within a reasonable time, this duty was breached.
- It was 'fair, just and reasonable' to allow a duty of care to exist between an ambulance service and its patients with regards to promptness of pickup (and presumably, return to the hospital) where no good reason for delay is offered.

Neither reasonable foreseeability nor proximity were disputed, nor were breach of duty (if it existed as such, without emergency service immunity) or causation. However, the LAS submitted that to establish this duty of care was against public policy considerations which in previous cases had limited the duty of care of the police, fire brigade and coastguard (who case law held not to have a duty of care to respond to a 999 call), on the grounds that it would divert their resources from ambulance provision to fighting court cases. Lord Woolf expediently (and somewhat arbitrarily) distinguished the ambulance service as different - despite answering 999 calls, it is part of the health service and thus shares the health service's duty of care to those in tortious proximity (he declared people to whom an ambulance is dispatched were in sufficient 'proximity'); he deemed it relevant that it only has to deal with the victim at the scene, and is not having to act with 'concern to protect the public generally', unlike the fire and police services (ignoring coastguards in this reasoning).

=== Obiter dicta ===
The ambulance service would not owe a duty of care under negligence for refusing to respond to a 999 call (though they may be in breach of statutory duty). Also, the burden upon the claimant of showing a causative want of proper care (considering the particular conditions of an emergency) would ordinarily provide ambulance services with what he called the ‘necessary protection’ against liability, except where their conduct was deficient.

== Significance ==
While the general rule has remained that the emergency services are not liable in negligence for an inadequate response, this case has made the exception that, where that inadequate response made the situation worse, a duty of care could exist under certain specific circumstances. However, it now seems that the statutory power granted to the ambulance service to answer an emergency call has crystallised into a specific duty to respond to a particular 999 call which was owed to C as a particular individual.

== See also ==
- London Ambulance Service
- Emergency medical services in the UK
- Oll v Secretary of State for Transport
- Alexandrou v. Oxford
- Capital and Counties plc v. Hampshire County Council
- duty of care
- negligence
- Donoghue v Stevenson
- Smith v Leech Brain & Co.
