= Robinson v Kilvert =

- Citation: (1889) LR 41 ChD 88

Robinson v Kilvert (1889) LR 41 ChD 88 is an English tort law case concerning nuisance. It deals with what is sometimes called the issue of a "sensitive claimant". Judges still look at this case when they need to figure out what counts as reasonable use of land.

== Background ==
In 1880s London, two neighbors ended up in court over a business dispute. Robinson stored paper upstairs in a building where Kilvert dried timber on the ground floor. The problem was that Kilvert's timber drying process created heat that rose up and damaged Robinson's paper stock.

Robinson kept brown paper for his business, and he said the heat from below was making it dry out and become brittle. This ruined the paper's quality and hurt his sales. What started as a neighbor complaint turned into a case that would influence law for decades.

== Court case ==
Robinson sued Kilvert for damages and wanted the court to make him stop the heat-producing work. The case went to the Chancery Division, where the judge had to decide a tough question: should Kilvert be responsible for damage caused by his normal business activities when they interfered with Robinson's particularly delicate operation?

Both men had real businesses to run. The question was whose rights mattered more when their activities didn't work well together.

=== Court decision ===
The judge ruled in Kilvert's favor and created what lawyers call the "abnormal sensitivity" rule. Justice Kay explained that you can't blame someone for nuisance just because their reasonable use of property happens to interfere with a neighbor's unusually sensitive activity.

The court said Kilvert's timber drying was completely normal for his business. Yes, the heat hurt Robinson's paper, but it wouldn't have bothered most other uses of that upstairs space. The judge made it clear that nuisance law protects ordinary uses of land, not activities that are unusually fragile.

=== Case this matters ===
This case gave courts a practical way to handle conflicts between property owners. Instead of just asking whether someone got hurt, judges now look at whether both people were using their property reasonably.

The decision stops people with overly sensitive operations from shutting down normal business activities nearby. This approach has worked well in thousands of disputes about noise, shaking, smells, and other problems between neighbors. It's especially helpful in business areas, where companies need some protection from neighbors who have unusually delicate work.

=== How courts use it today ===
English judges have used Robinson v Kilvert in hundreds of nuisance cases since 1889, especially when industrial work conflicts with sensitive neighbors. Courts have applied the same thinking to noise and vibration cases too.

The case has influenced courts in Australia, Canada, and some American states when they deal with similar problems. Legal scholars still point to it as one of the key cases that helped define reasonable limits on nuisance claims.

Modern environmental and planning laws often use similar thinking when officials have to decide if different types of businesses can operate near each other. A dispute between two Victorian-era London businessmen still shapes how we think about property rights today.

== Facts ==
A landlord's cellar maintained an 80 °F (27 °C) temperature for its business, and the heat affected a tenant's paper warehouse business on a floor above.

== Judgment ==
The court held that the tenant had no remedy because the landlord was a reasonable user of his property.

== See also ==
- English tort law
- Sturges v Bridgman
