= OLL Ltd v Secretary of State for Transport =

OLL Ltd v Secretary of State for Transport [1997] 3 All ER 897 is an English court case concerned with negligence from the King's Bench Division of the High Court of England and Wales with particular regard to the duty of care owed by the emergency services. Her Majesty's Coastguard do not usually owe a duty of care to people who require its assistance.

== Facts ==
In this case, it was claimed His Majesty's Coastguard had failed to respond in an adequate period of time to the Lyme Bay canoeing disaster where four school children died after getting into difficulty while on a school trip in Lyme Bay, Dorset. The parent company of the outdoor centre that ran the trip, OLL Ltd, settled several claims with the victims and was seeking a contribution from the Secretary of State for Transport, under whose remit HM Coastguard falls as an executive agency.

== Judgement ==
The issue boiled down to whether the coastguard owed a duty of care to those it was aware required its assistance (other cases had held that the police and firefighters did not owe such a duty, see below). It was held that HM Coastguard did not owe a duty of care to those requiring its assistance unless they actively made the situation worse, rather than by omission, as was the case here. As such, the claim was dismissed and the hire company were forced to foot the bill for the entirety of the compensation. However, this case did not reach the appeals courts: the Court of Appeal of England and Wales and the House of Lords and so this rule could easily change, should a further, similar case, reach the higher courts.

== See also ==
- Kent v Griffiths (Opposite rule for the ambulance service)
- Capital and Counties plc v Hampshire County Council (Fire Brigade)
- Alexandrou v Oxford (Police)
- Hill v Chief Constable of West Yorkshire (Similar to above, regarding criminal investigations)
- Negligence
- Duty of care
- Vicarious liability
- Donoghue v Stevenson
- Smith v Leech Brain & Co
