= Misfeasance in public office =

Cause of action in English law

Misfeasance in public office is a cause of action in the civil courts of England and Wales and certain Commonwealth countries. It is an action against the holder of a public office, alleging in essence that the office-holder has misused or abused their power. The tort can be traced back to 1703 when Chief Justice Sir John Holt decided that a landowner could sue a police constable who deprived him of his right to vote (Ashby v White). The tort was revived in 1985 when it was used so that French turkey producers could sue the Ministry of Agriculture over a dispute that harmed their sales.

Generally, a civil defendant will be liable for misfeasance if the defendant owed a duty of care toward the plaintiff, the defendant breached that duty of care by improperly performing a legal act, and the improper performance resulted in harm to the plaintiff.

In theory, misfeasance is distinct from nonfeasance. Nonfeasance is a failure to act that results in harm to another party. Misfeasance, by contrast, is some affirmative act that, though legal, causes harm. In practice, the distinction is confusing and uninstructive. Courts often have difficulty determining whether harm resulted from a failure to act or from an act that was improperly performed.

== Grounds ==
In most cases, the essentials to bring an action of misfeasance in public office are that the office-holder acted illegally, knew they were doing so, and knew or should reasonably have known that third parties would suffer loss as a result.

== BCCI ==
As a civil law action, the use of misfeasance of public office has grown in recent years, the law having been clarified in the litigation involving the collapse of the Bank of Credit and Commerce International. The ruling clarified that there are two types of misfeasance in public office. One known as "targeted malice" occurs when a public officer intentionally abuses their position with the motive of inflicting damage upon the claimant. The second is termed "untargeted malice"; this is committed by a public official who acts in a generalized way, knowing that they are not legally empowered to do the act complained of.

If misfeasance in public office did not tenuously exist as an historical survival, it is doubtful whether anyone would invent it, at least in the form of a tort.

— Philip Allott, The Cambridge Law Journal, Vol. 60, No. 1. (Mar. 2001)

== Railtrack ==
In July 2005, 49,500 private shareholders of Britain's national railway infrastructure company Railtrack sued the Secretary of State for Transport for damages, alleging that in October 2001 the then holder of that office, Stephen Byers MP, had acted unlawfully in planning to put their company into administration on the grounds that it was insolvent. The legal action failed because – as an action involving reflective loss – the shareholders had to prove, in addition to the grounds specified above, malice on the part of Byers. They did not have the evidence to do so.

== See also ==
- Abuse of power
- Administrative liability in English law
- Malfeasance in office
- Misfeasance
- Political corruption
- State liability
