= RTA Insurer =

Road Traffic Act insurer, or RTA insurer for short, is a British colloquial term for an insurer that is still liable to a road traffic accident victim based on a voided policy, as defined by the United Kingdom Road Traffic Act 1988 regulations.

== Background ==
In the United Kingdom, motor insurance companies and policyholders agree the 'utmost good faith', where both parties in the contract have to disclose the correct required information needed to create a policy. In cases where there is an outstanding claim and the insurance company detects incorrect or wrongly provided information (known as non-disclosure), they would class it as a breach of the contract terms and may terminate the policy or increase the premium (depending on the seriousness of the non-disclosure).

If an insurer decides to void the policy they then have the right to cease proceedings on the policyholders claim. However, they may still be obliged to pay any innocent third party claimant as the RTA Insurer (i.e. they still have a liability to third parties). A maximum of £1,000,000 can be paid for third party property claims and the insurer may look to pursue their policyholder for the cost of any payments made. Unlike the Article 75 Insurer, RTA Insurers understand that the policy would have been accepted and valid prior to the policy inception as the non-disclosed material either isn't serious enough to have denied insurance in the first place, or it occurred after the policy start date.

== Article 75 ==
An insurer may look to seek Article 75 status within RTA law if it transpires that the policyholder failed to declare an important fact (such as a drink-drive ban). In this case the insurer will cancel the policy as if it was never incepted (known as ab initio). To do so, an insurer must apply for a declaration under Section 152(2) of the Road Traffic Act 1988 through the court system.

The benefit to an insurer in applying for Article 75 status is that there is no liability if there is another insurer with a higher status (contractual or RTA), and their driver has a meaningful degree of liability (even 1% of liability rests with another party). There is also no liability to meet subrogated claims (claims where another party should have been responsible for settling). Claims for damage to property arising before (but not after) 11 June 2007 are subject to a compulsory excess of £300.

== List of insurance covers ==
Insurance Cover
Types
Comprehensive cover
Third Party, Fire & Theft Cover
Third Party Only Cover
RTA INSURER
Article 75 Insurer

== Policy Issued ==
Position under RTA 1988 and Article 75 2004

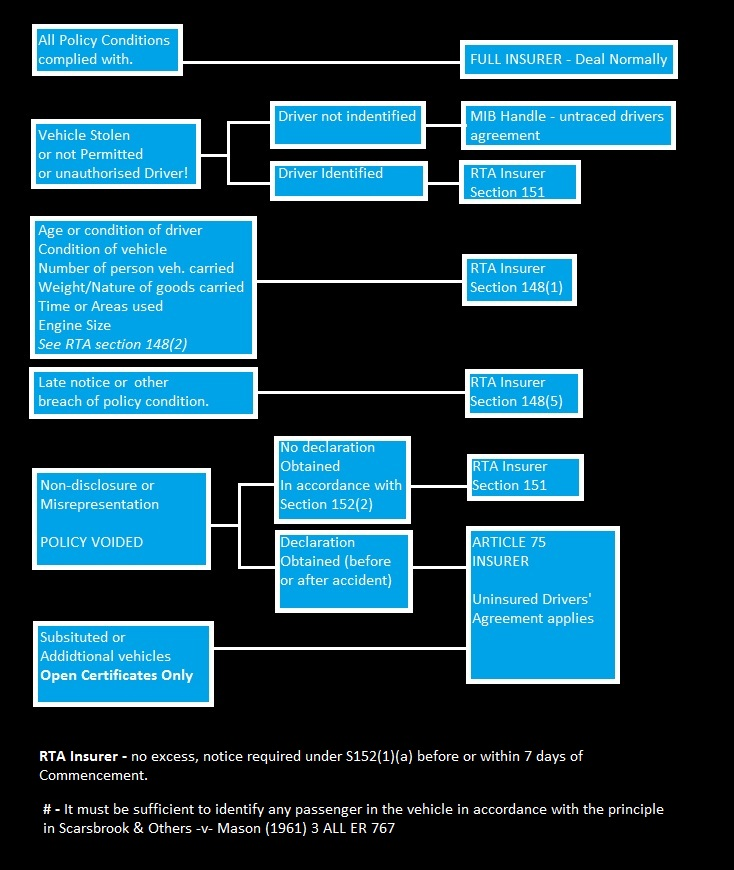
