= Case of the Thorns =

The Case of the Thorns (1466) YB 6 Ed 4, 7a pl 18, is an important historical court case from the King's Bench in common law torts. The English case, which occurred in the 15th century, is the earliest record of a common law court basing its decision on the now fundamental principle of torts: That if an individual suffers (civil) damages at the hand of another, that individual has a right to be compensated.

The case was cited approvingly by United States Supreme Court Justice Oliver Wendell Holmes Jr as a leading case in tort law.

The case, technically cited as Hulle v. Orynge 1466. Y.B.M. 6 Edw. IV, folio 7, placitum 18., is still widely used in American law schools in introductory tort classes into the 21st century.

== Background ==
The defendant owned a 1-acre farm adjoining the plaintiff's 5 acres, which were separated by a hedge of thorn bush. The defendant was trying to retrieve thorns from a dividing hedge which had fallen onto the Plaintiff's property. In retrieving the thorns the defendant had damaged some of the plaintiff's crops; specifically he "trampled and damaged" the crops. The issue was whether the defendant was liable for trespass.

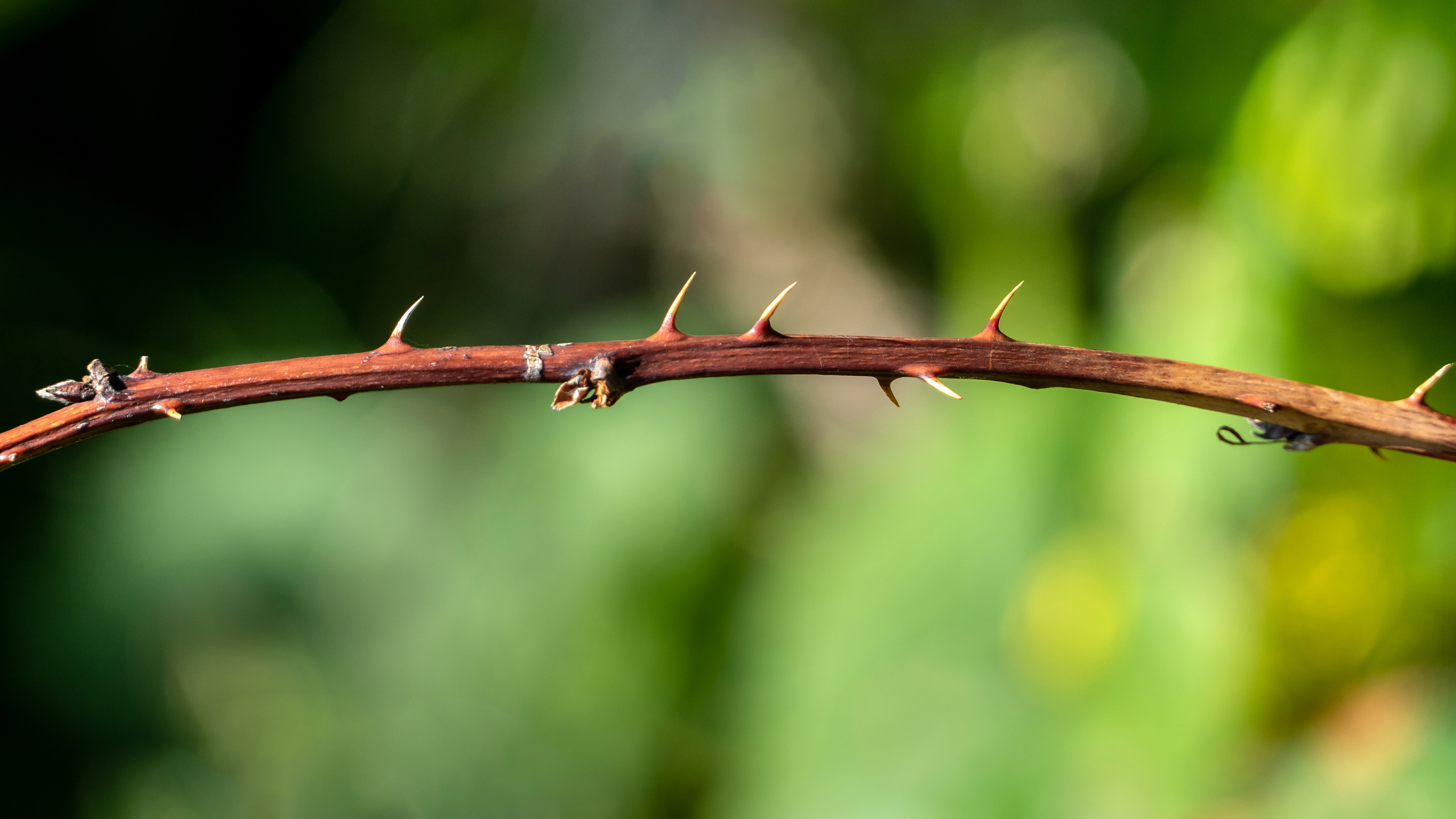
Thorns a blackberry branch

Until the invention of more sophisticated security systems, thorny branches were often used as a defense against burglary, being strategically planted below windows or around the entire perimeter of a property.

== Rule ==
Although the decision was divided, the majority held that if a person damages another's property there is a tort even if the action that brought such damages was itself lawful. As Pigot, J states, "And so if a man has a fish-pond in his manor and he empties the water out of the pond to take the fishes and the water floods my land, I shall have a good action, and yet the act was lawful."

- One who voluntarily does an act which results in damages to another is responsible for the damages even if the act was lawful.

== Report ==
This case excerpt was summarised in Bessy v Olliot & Lambert (1681) as follows.

"Trespass quare vi et armis clausum fregit, et herbam suam pedibus conculcando consumpsit in six Acres. The defendant pleads, that he hath an Acre lying next the said six Acres, and upon it a Hedge of Thorns, and he cut the Thorns, and they ipso invito fell upon the Plaintiff's Land, and the defendant took them off as soon as he could, which is the same Trespass; and the Plaintiff demurred; and adjudged for the Plaintiff; for though a Man doth a lawful Thing, yet if any damage do thereby befal[l] another, he shall answer for it, if he could have avoided it. As if a Man lop a Tree, and the [Boughs] fall upon another ipso invito, yet an Action lies. If a Manshoot at [Butts], and hurt another unawares, an Action lies. I have Land through which a River runs to your Mill, and I lop the Sallows growing upon the [Riverside], which accidentally stop the Water, so as your Mill is hindered, an action lies. If I am building my own house, and a Piece of Timber falls on my neighbour's house and breaks Part of it, an action lies. If a Man assault me and I lift up my Staff to defend myself, and in lifting it uphit another, an Action lies by that Person, and yet I did a lawful Thing. And the Reason of all these Cases is, because he that is damaged ought to be recompensed. But otherwise it is in Criminal Cases, for there actus non facit reum nisi mens sit rea."

== See also ==
- Trespass
- English tort law
