= Smith v Leech Brain & Co Ltd =

British legal case

Smith v Leech Brain & Co [1962] 2 QB 405 is a landmark English tort law case in negligence, concerning remoteness of damage or causation in law. It marked the establishment of the eggshell skull rule, the idea that an individual is held responsible for the full consequences of his negligence, regardless of extra, or special damage caused to others.

== Facts ==
The defendant company employed the plaintiff victim as a galvaniser whose duties included using a crane to lift metal items and immerse them into a tank of molten zinc. While doing so, an object spattered out from the tank and burned him on the lip. This burn was the "promoting agent" of a cancer from which he died three years later. The employer's negligence in respect to the burn was not disputed, and was determined to have caused the claimant's death. The important legal issue, however, was that the claimant had a predisposition to the cancer in his skin tissue. The issue for the court to resolve was whether the cancer was too remote from the original negligence for the claimant to be allowed compensation.

== Judgement ==
It was held that the defendants had been negligent and were therefore liable for damages to the complainant.

Lord Parker stated:

If a man is negligently run over... it is no answer to the sufferer’s claim for damages that he would have suffered less injury... if he had not had an unusually thin skull or an unusually weak heart

The ratio decidendi is that a tortfeasor is liable for negligent damage, even when the claimant had a predisposition that made that damage more severe than it otherwise would have been.

- This strict liability approach in negligence now applies ONLY to personal injury;
- To claim for damage to property, the claimant must now show that the loss is foreseeable.
- Claiming for economic loss, typically an "assumption of responsibility" must be proven.

== Other Cases ==
The following were considered by the court in deciding this case:

- Dulieu v White & Sons [1901] 2 KB 669
- Re Polemis & Furniss, Withy & Co Ltd
- Overseas Tankship (UK) Ltd v The Miller Steamship Co (Wagon Mound No. 2)

Several cases have since referred to or applied this case:

- Tremain v Pike [1969] 3 All ER 1303
- Wieland v Cyril Lord Carpets Ltd [1969] 3 All ER 1006
- Vacwell Engineering Co Ltd v BDH Chemicals Ltd 3 All ER 1681,
- Robinson v Post Office [1974] 2 All ER 737
- Brice v Brown [1984] 1 All ER 997
- Dean v Gallaher Ltd [1995] NI 229

== See also ==
- Barnett v Chelsea & Kensington Hospital
