= State liability =

Tort liability of government

State liability is the legal liability of a state. It refer to the liability of an organ of state or public authority in that state's own domestic legal system, typically under special principles within the law of tort or delict.

== See also ==
- Misfeasance in public office
