= Overseas Tankship (UK) Ltd v Morts Dock and Engineering Co Ltd =

Landmark tort law case in England

Wagon Mound (No. 1)
- Court: Privy Council
- Decided: 18 January 1961
- Citations: [1961] UKPC 2, [1961] AC 388; [1961] 1 All ER 404

Case history
- Prior actions: Overseas Tankship (UK) Ltd v Morts Dock & Engineering Co (The Wagon Mound) (No 1) (1959) 61 SR (NSW) 688

Court membership
- Judges sitting: Viscount Simonds; Lord Reid; Lord Radcliffe; Lord Tucker; Lord Morris of Borth-y-Gest

Case opinions
- Decision by: Viscount Simonds

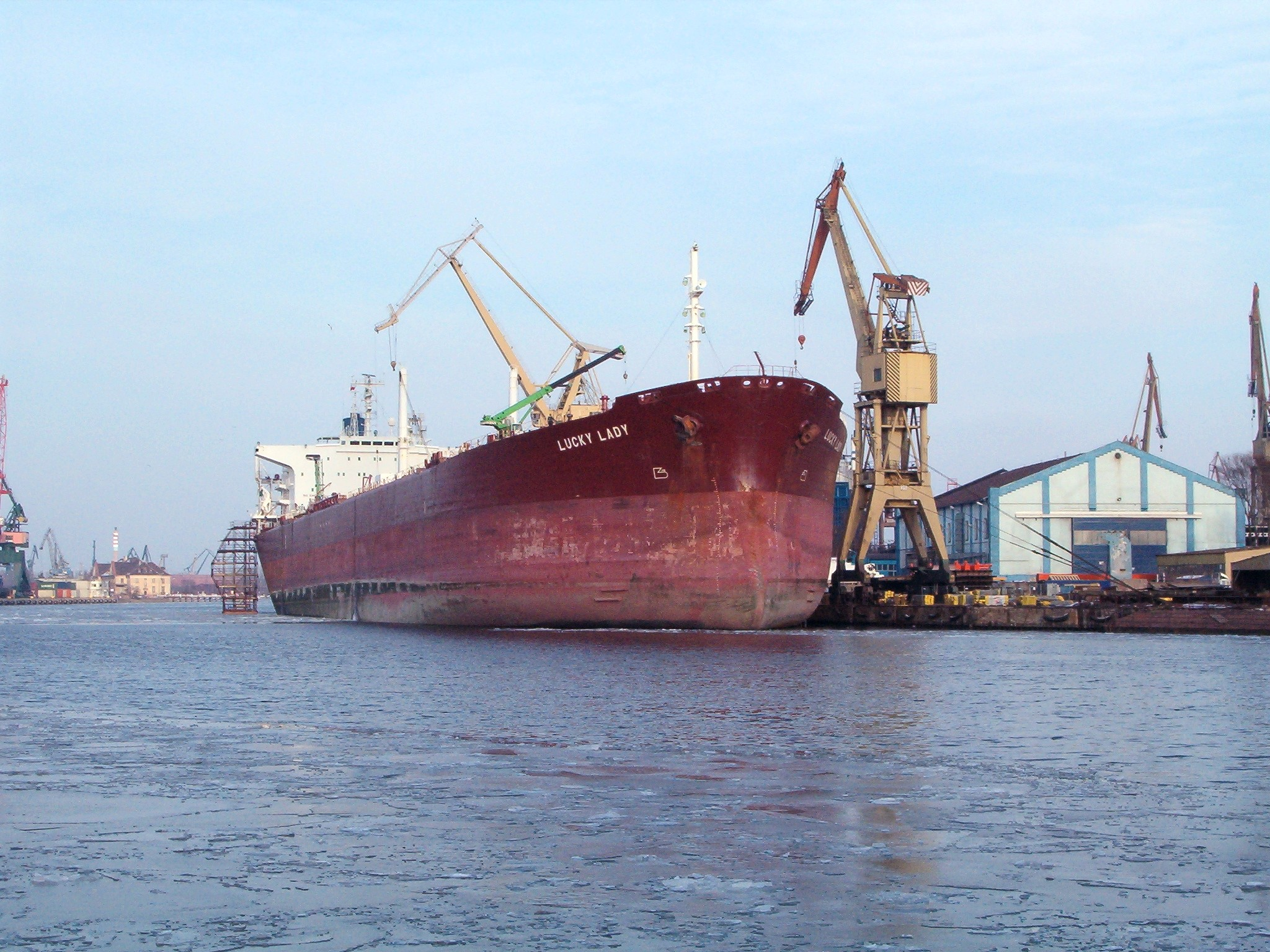
Crude oil tanker Lucky Lady in shipyard in Gdańsk

Overseas Tankship (UK) Ltd v Morts Dock and Engineering Co Ltd, commonly known as Wagon Mound (No. 1), is a landmark tort law case, which imposed a remoteness rule for causation in negligence. The Privy Council held that a party can be held liable only for loss that was reasonably foreseeable. Contributory negligence on the part of the dock owners (continuing to weld with knowledge of the presence of furnace oil on the water) was also relevant in the decision, and was essential to the outcome, although not central to this case's legal significance.

The Wagon Mound (No 1) should not be confused with the successor case of the Overseas Tankship v Miller Steamship or "Wagon Mound (No 2)", which concerned the standard of the reasonable man in breach of the duty of care.

== Facts ==
In October 1951, Wagon Mound, a ship of Overseas Tankship, docked in Sydney Harbour. The crew allowed furnace oil, also referred to as Bunker oil, to leak from the ship, and it drifted under a wharf, thickly coating the water and the shore where other ships were being repaired. Hot metal produced by welders using oxyacetylene torches on the respondent's timber wharf (Mort's Dock) at Sheerlegs Wharf fell on floating cotton waste, igniting the oil on the water. The wharf and ships moored there sustained substantial fire damage. In an action by Mort's Dock for damages for negligence, it was found as a fact that the defendants did not know and could not reasonably have been expected to know that the oil was capable of being set alight when spread on water. The dock owners knew the oil was there, and continued to use welders.

The leading case on proximate cause was Re Polemis, which held that a defendant can be deemed liable for all consequences flowing from his negligent conduct regardless of how unforeseeable such consequences are. As this case was binding in Australia, its rule was followed by the New South Wales Court of Appeal. The defendant appealed to the Privy Council.

== Judgment ==
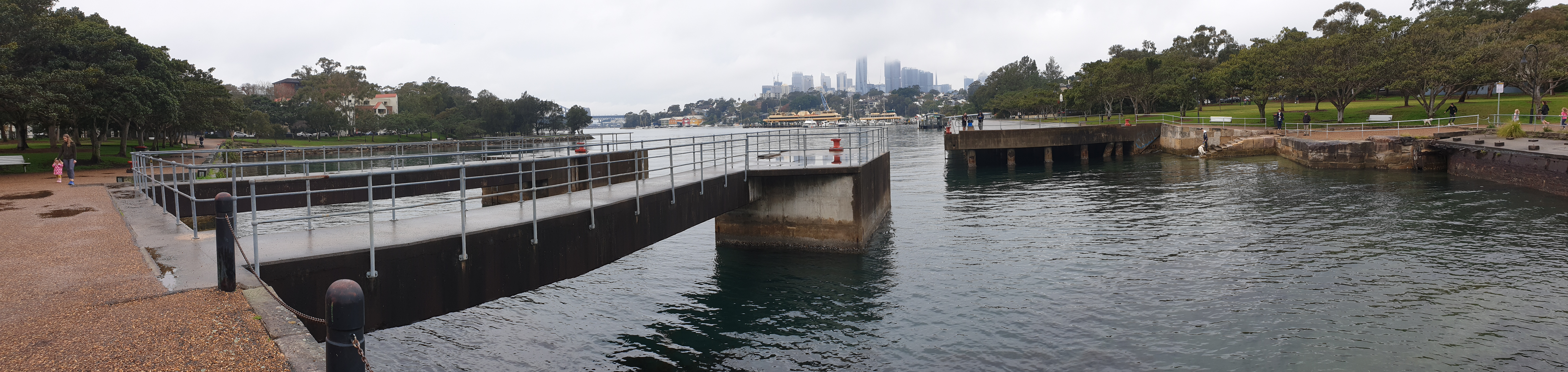
Former site of Mort's Dock, Balmain, New South Wales.

The Privy Council found in favour of the defendant, agreeing with the expert witness who provided evidence that the defendant, in spite of the furnace oil being innately flammable, could not reasonably expect it to burn on water. The Board indicated Morts would probably have been successful if they had claimed damages for direct damage by the oil to the slipway but this was minor and not part of the damages claimed (although success on this count may have saved Morts Dock and Engineering the costs of all the litigation for both parties across all three levels of court). Viscount Simonds, in his delivery for the Privy Council, said that the counsel for Morts had discredited their own position by arguing that it could not have been bunkering oil because it would not burn on water. The Privy Council's advice soundly disapproved the rule established in Re Polemis, as being "out of the current of contemporary thought" and held that to find a party liable for negligence the damage must be reasonably foreseeable. The council found that even though the crew were careless and breached their duty of care, the resulting extensive damage by fire was not foreseeable by a reasonable person, although the minor damage of oil on metal on the slipway would have been foreseeable.

Viscount Simonds delivered the judgment of the Board and said:

It is, no doubt, proper when considering tortious liability for negligence to analyse its elements and to say that the plaintiff must prove a duty owed to him by the defendant, a breach of that duty by the defendant, and consequent damage. But there can be no liability until the damage has been done. It is not the act but the consequences on which tortious liability is founded. ... Who knows or can be assumed to know all the processes of nature? But if it would be wrong that a man should be held liable for damage unpredictable by a reasonable man because it was "direct" or "natural," equally it would be wrong that he should escape liability, however "indirect" the damage, if he foresaw or could reasonably foresee the intervening events which led to its being done.

It is a principle of civil liability, subject only to qualifications which have no present relevance, that a man must be considered to be responsible for the probable consequences of his act. To demand more of him is too harsh a rule, to demand less is to ignore that civilised order requires the observance of a minimum standard of behaviour.

== Significance ==
Up until this time the leading case had been Re Polemis, where the central question was that of the directness of the chain of events between the triggering act being examined for negligence and the result. The Council decided that rather than go with precedent (authority) they would determine a principle from a range of cases, in a similar way as Lord Atkin did in Donoghue v Stevenson, and their principle was primarily a single test for foreseeability which they argued was a logical link between the damage and the liability (culpability). Stated differently, foreseeability was the logical link between, and the test for, breach of the duty of care and the damages. This is the supreme test, and may be rephrased as "the liability of a consequence ... was natural or necessary or probable." The Lords made reference to hindsight, indicating it is nothing like foresight and should play no role in assessing negligence. There is authority to challenge this view of hindsight; in Page v Smith, Lord Lloyd stated: "In the case of secondary victims, i.e. persons who were not participants in an accident, the defendant will not be liable unless psychiatric injury is foreseeable in a person of normal fortitude and it may be legitimate to use hindsight in order to be able to apply the test of reasonable foreseeability."

The Lords gave Morts the opportunity to sue in nuisance but there is no record of them testing this action in that tort. The common law rules of causation have had their importance lessened by the promulgation of statute law in Australia. Contributory negligence is now essential for many determinations and are covered by statutes such as the Civil Liability Act (1936) South Australia which has more recent counterparts in a number of jurisdictions including New South Wales.

== See also ==
- English tort law
- Overseas Tankship v Miller Steamship (The Wagon Mound No. 2)
- Hughes v Lord Advocate
- Doughty v Turner Manufacturing
- Greenland v Chaplin (1850) 5 Ex 243, Pollock CB advocates foreseeability
- Smith v The London and South Western Railway Company (1870–71) LR 6 CP 14, directness test held to prevail
