= Overseas Tankship (UK) Ltd v The Miller Steamship Co =

Landmark tort case, concerning the test for breach of duty of care in negligence

Wagon Mound (No. 2)
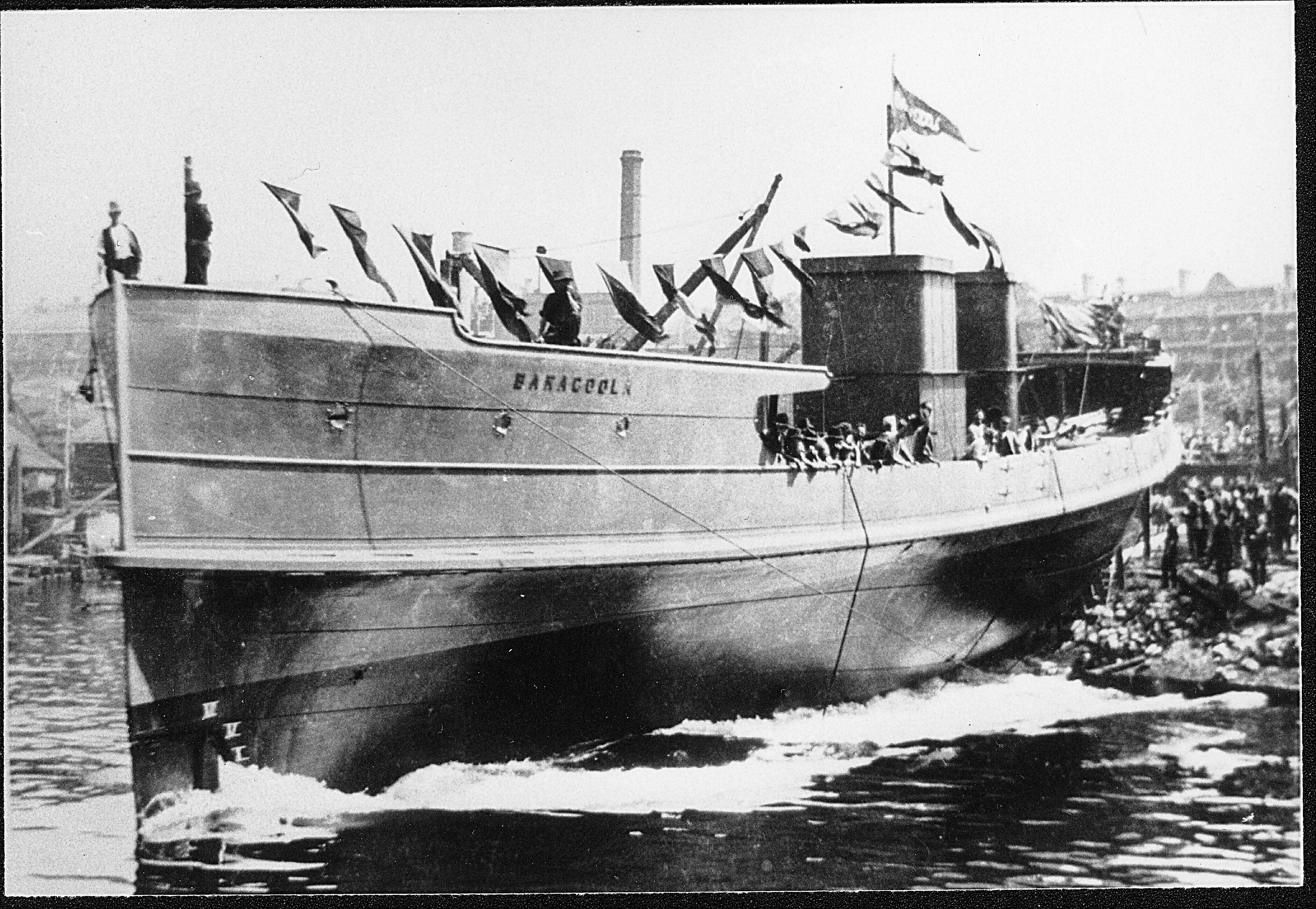
- Ships at Mort's Dock, Sydney
- Court: Privy Council
- Citations: [1966] UKPC 10, [1967] AC 617; [1967] 2 All ER 709

Case history
- Prior action: Miller Steamship Co Pty Ltd v Overseas Tankship (UK) Ltd (1963) SR (NSW) 948

Court membership
- Judges sitting: Lord Reid, Lord Morris of Borth-y-Gest, Lord Pearce, Lord Wilberforce, Lord Pearson

Keywords
- Breach of duty

Overseas Tankship (UK) Ltd v The Miller Steamship Co or Wagon Mound (No. 2), is a landmark tort case, concerning the test for breach of duty of care in negligence. The Judicial Committee of the Privy Council held that loss will be recoverable where the extent of possible harm is so great that a reasonable man would guard against it (even if the chance of the loss occurring was very small).

Wagon Mound (No. 2) should not be confused with the previous case of the Overseas Tankship (UK) Ltd v Morts Dock and Engineering Co Ltd or Wagon Mound (No. 1), which introduced remoteness as a rule of causation to limit compensatory damages.

== Facts ==
Overseas Tankship chartered a freighter ship named the Wagon Mound which was taking on bunker oil at Mort's Dock in Sydney. The engineers on the Wagon Mound were careless and a large quantity of oil overflowed onto the surface of the water. After several hours the oil drifted and was around two ships owned by the Miller Steamship Co that were being repaired nearby. Sparks from the welders caused the leaked oil to ignite destroying all three ships.

At the trial in the Supreme Court of New South Wales, Walsh J found that (1) that the officers of the Wagon Mound would regard the oil as very difficult, but not impossible, to ignite on water (2) ignition of the oil on waters had very rarely happened, and (3) it was a possibility that would only eventuate in very exceptional circumstances. Walsh J held that Overseas Tankship were not liable for negligence, but that the large quantity of oil was a public nuisance and the Overseas Tankship were liable to pay damages for nuisance.

Overseas Tankship obtained leave to appeal directly to the Privy Council on the verdict of nuisance and the Miller Steamship Co obtained leave to appeal on the verdict of negligence.

== Judgment ==
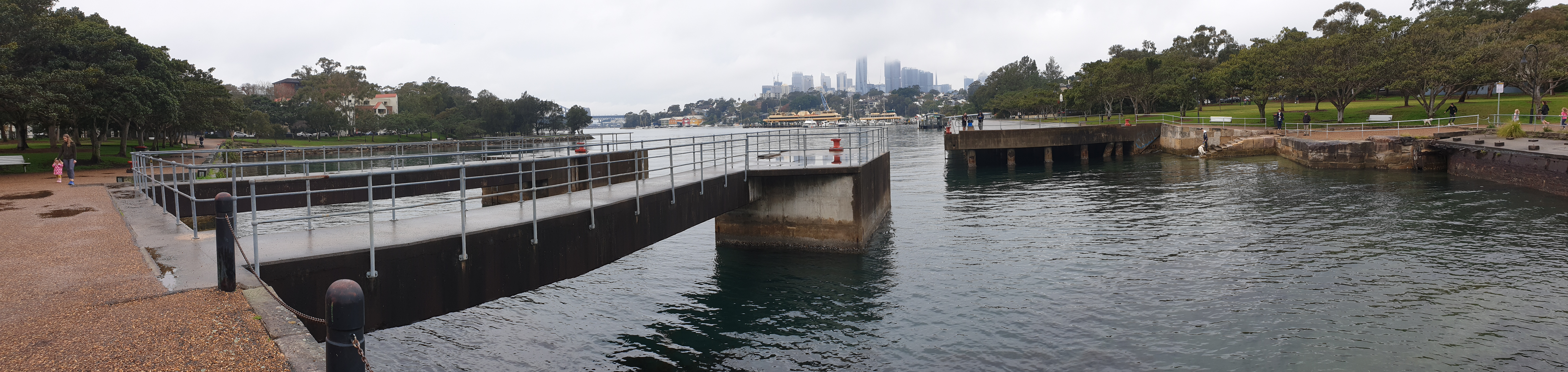
Former site of Mort's Dock, Balmain, New South Wales.

The Privy Council upheld both the appeal and the cross-appeal. They held that it was not sufficient that the damage to the Miller Steamship vessels was the direct result of the nuisance if that damage was unforeseeable. In relation to negligence the Privy Council held that a reasonable person in the position of the ship's engineer would have been aware of the risk of fire. Since the gravity of the potential damage from fire was so great there was no excuse for allowing the oil to be discharged even if the probability or risk of fire was low. A reasonable person, the Council held, would only neglect a risk of such a potentially great magnitude if he or she had a reason to do so, e.g. if it were cost prohibitive. Lord Reid said at 718–719,

It follows that in their Lordships view the only question is whether a reasonable man, having the knowledge and experience to be expected of the chief engineer of the Wagon Mound, would have known that there was a real risk of the oil on the water catching fire in some way.

The words "real risk" are the requirement of remoteness of damage but the test of foreseeability does not depend upon the actual risk of occurrence. The test is really whether the engineer ought to have foreseen the outbreak of fire, i.e. the type of consequence ought to have been foreseen.

== Significance ==
This idea of a balance between magnitude and seriousness of risk is similar to that proposed by Learned Hand in United States v. Carroll Towing Co. 159 F.2d 169 (2d Cir. 1947) on the subject of legal causation. Such a formulation of the issue has struck some in the field as an argument along the lines typically made in the Law & Economics camp usually seen to be represented by the American Judge Richard Posner.

The holding in this case was harshly criticized for its "overloading of the foreseeability concept" by renowned torts scholar Leon A. Green.

== See also ==
- Re Polemis, [1921] 3 K.B. 560
- List of Judicial Committee of the Privy Council cases
