= McKew v Holland & Hannan & Cubitts (Scotland) Ltd =

McKew v Holland and Hannen and Cubitts (Scotland) Ltd
- Court: House of Lords
- Citation: [1969] 3 All ER 1621

McKew v Holland and Hannen and Cubitts (Scotland) Ltd [1969] 3 All ER 1621 is an English tort law case, concerning causation between a breach of duty and damage.

== Facts ==
McKew had a work accident, his leg was weakened and stiffened. He tried to descend a steep staircase after inspecting a flat. His leg gave way. To avoid landing head first, he threw himself down, landing on and breaking his right ankle.

== Judgment ==
The House of Lords held McKew's negligence broke the causal chain, and his employer was not liable for the further injury. The attempt to descend the stairs was unreasonable.

== See also ==
- English tort law
