= X v Bedfordshire CC =

X and others (minors) v Bedfordshire County Council [1995] 3 All ER 353 was a series of five linked appeals which reached the House of Lords in 1995. The case is an important authority relating to administrative liability in English law. The cases concerned claims for personal injury arising out of a statutory duty and negligence by Bedfordshire County Council. It was claimed that the claimants had suffered parental neglect and abuse which the Council had known about but had failed to prevent. The Council successfully argued that they didn't owe a duty to the claimants because of the potential floodgates that this would open to future cases.

== See also ==
- Administrative liability in English Law
