= Barnett v Chelsea & Kensington Hospital Management Committee =

English tort law case

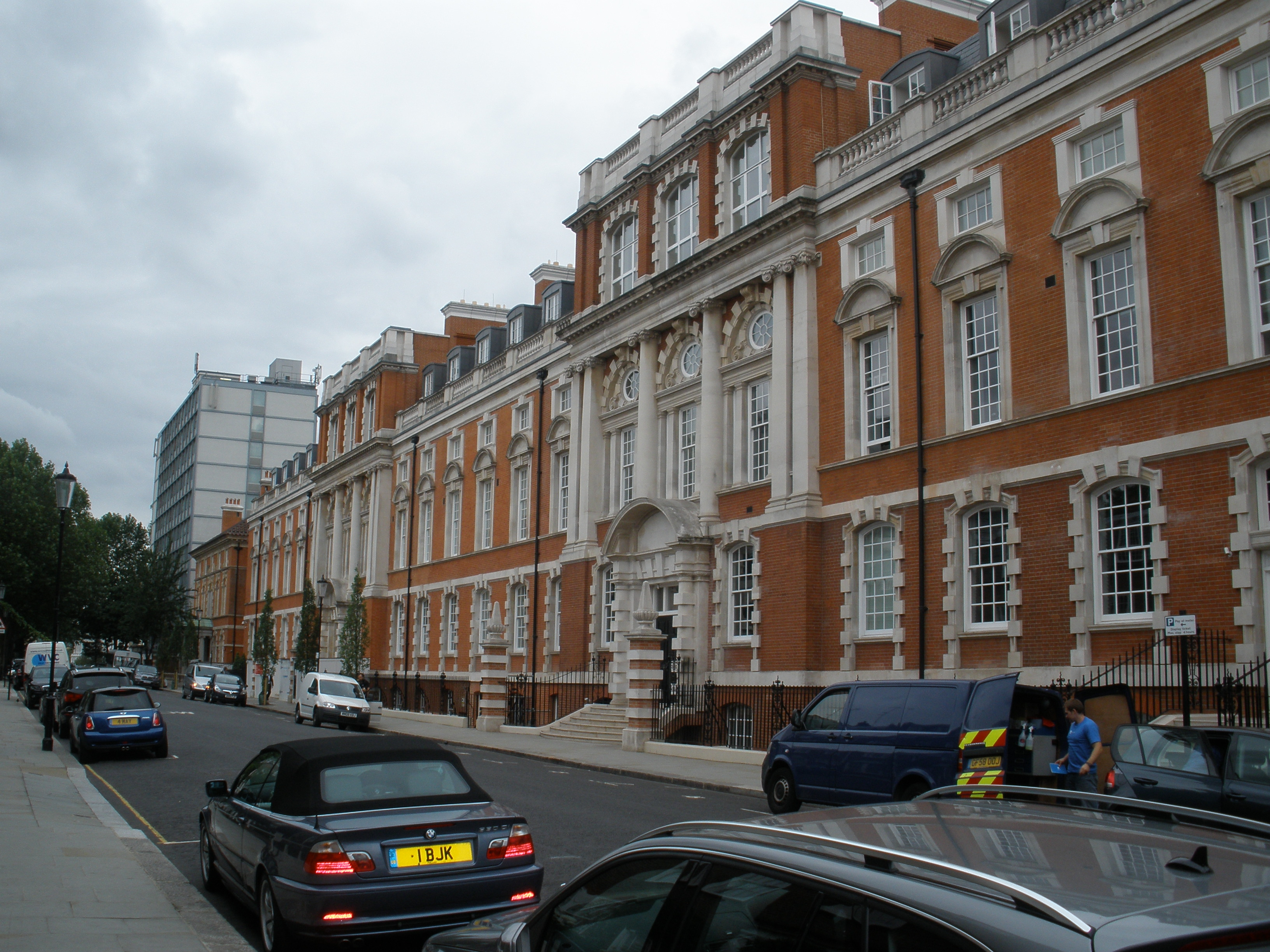
- The former Chelsea College of Science and Technology, now privately owned flats.
- Court: High Court of Justice, Queen's Bench Division
- Citations: [1968] 2 WLR 422, [1969] 1 QB 428, [1968] 1 All ER 1068

Court membership
- Judge sitting: Nield J

Keywords
- Negligence; Causation (law)

Barnett v Chelsea & Kensington Hospital Management Committee [1968] 2 WLR 422 is an English tort law case that applies the "but for" test of causation.

== Facts ==
After their night shift as night-watchmen at the Chelsea College of Science and Technology, at about 8 am on 1 January 1966, three people went to the emergency department of the hospital run by the Chelsea & Kensington Hospital Management Committee. (They had actually already visited this hospital at about 4 am because an intruder had struck one of them in the head with an iron bar.) They spoke to a nurse and told her that they had been vomiting since drinking tea at about 5 am. The casualty officer, Dr. Banerjee, did not see them. He advised the nurse, over the phone, that they should go home and call their own doctors. One of them, Mr. Barnett, died about five hours later from arsenic poisoning. Mrs. Barnett sued the hospital for negligence.

== Judgment ==
Neild J held that the hospital was not liable. Even if they were to have admitted Mr. Barnett, there would have been little or no chance that the antidote would have been administered to him in time to prevent his death. Although the hospital had breached the standard of care, that breach was held to not be a cause of Mr. Barnett's death.

A doctor’s refusal to treat a patient who appears before him after swallowing arsenic is not a cause of fact in the patient’s subsequent death if it is established that even proper treatment would not have saved him.

== Significance ==
The case is often cited in tort law as an example of the test of factual causation (commonly known as the "but for" test): but for the defendant's negligence, would the claimant have still suffered the loss?

== See also ==
- Negligence
