= ICI Ltd v Shatwell =

- Court: House of Lords
- Citation: [1965] AC 656
- Transcript: judgment

Court membership
- Judge sitting: Lord Reid Viscount Radcliffe Lord Hodson Lord Pearce Lord Donovan

Keywords
- Volenti non fit injuria

ICI Ltd v Shatwell [1965] AC 656 is a UK labour law case concerning employer liability for accidents at work.

== Facts ==
Two shot firing brothers were injured because they ‘could not be bothered’ to take the mandatory precautions.

== Judgment ==
Lord Denning MR held that they were not entitled to compensation. The House of Lords had previously ruled in Smith v Baker & Sons [1891] AC 325 that an employee did not implicitly consent to risk arising from a dangerous workplace, and as such the defence of volenti non fit injuria (that an employer is not liable for an injury that results from risk that the employee consents to) could not be relied upon in such a situation. However ICI was in full compliance with relevant safety regulations, having safety precautions in place and ensuring that their employees, including the experienced Shatwell, were aware of them. ICI was thus held not to be vicariously liable for compensation for injury resulting from Shatwell's active disregard of his employer's instructions and statutory regulations.

== See also ==
- UK labour law
- Unfair dismissal
