= Nuisance =

Common law tort causing inconvenience or damage

Nuisance (from archaic nocence, through Fr. noisance, nuisance, from Lat. nocere, "to hurt") is a common law tort. It means something which causes offence, annoyance, trouble or injury. A nuisance can be either public (also "common") or private. A public nuisance was defined by English scholar Sir James Fitzjames Stephen as,

"an act not warranted by law, or an omission to discharge a legal duty, which act or omission obstructs or causes inconvenience or damage to the public in the exercise of rights common to all Her Majesty's subjects".

Private nuisance is the interference with the right of specific people. Nuisance is one of the oldest causes of action known to the common law, with cases framed in nuisance going back almost to the beginning of recorded case law. Nuisance signifies that the "right of quiet enjoyment" is being disrupted to such a degree that a tort is being committed .

== Definition ==
Under the common law, persons in possession of real property (land owners, lease holders etc.) are entitled to the quiet enjoyment of their lands. However this doesn't include visitors or those who aren't considered to have an interest in the land. If a neighbour interferes with that quiet enjoyment, either by creating smells, sounds, pollution or any other hazard that extends past the boundaries of the property, the affected party may make a claim in nuisance.

Legally, the term nuisance is traditionally used in three ways:

1. to describe an activity or condition that is harmful or annoying to others (e.g., indecent conduct, a rubbish heap or a smoking chimney)
2. to describe the harm caused by the before-mentioned activity or condition (e.g., loud noises or objectionable odors)
3. to describe a legal liability that arises from the combination of the two. However, the "interference" was not the result of a neighbor stealing land or trespassing on the land. Instead, it arose from activities taking place on another person's land that affected the enjoyment of that land.

The law of nuisance was created to stop such bothersome activities or conduct when they unreasonably interfered either with the rights of other private landowners (i.e., private nuisance) or with the rights of the general public (i.e., public nuisance)

A public nuisance is an unreasonable interference with the public's right to property. It includes conduct that interferes with public health, safety, peace or convenience. The unreasonableness may be evidenced by statute, or by the nature of the act, including how long, and how bad, the effects of the activity may be.

Private nuisance arose out of the action on the case and protects a person’s right to the use and enjoyment of their land. It doesn't include trespass.

To be a nuisance, the level of interference must rise above the merely aesthetic. For example: if your neighbour paints their house purple, it may offend you; however, it doesn't rise to the level of nuisance. In most cases, normal uses of a property that can constitute quiet enjoyment cannot be restrained in nuisance either. For example, the sound of a crying baby may be annoying, but it is an expected part of quiet enjoyment of property and does not constitute a nuisance.Nuisance distinguishes between cases where the conduct alleged to be a nuisance has caused material injury to property and the cases where it has caused "sensible personal discomfort".

Any affected property owner has standing to sue for a private nuisance. If a nuisance is widespread enough, but yet has a public purpose, it is often treated at law as a public nuisance. Owners of interests in real property (whether owners, lessors, or holders of an easement or other interest) have standing only to bring private nuisance suits. According to Oldham v Lawson (where held that the husband has a mere licence and had no title to sue whereas his wife as owner did have title to sue) and some later cases, exclusive possession is necessary to establish a private nuisance case. However, one situation related to transform a private nuisance against land to one against person, this case is no longer considered to be authoritative.

== History and legal development ==
In the late 19th and early 20th centuries, the law of nuisance became difficult to administer, as competing property uses often posed a nuisance to each other, and the cost of litigation to settle the issue grew prohibitive. As such, most jurisdictions now have a system of land use planning (e.g. zoning) that describes what activities are acceptable in a given location. Zoning generally overrules nuisance. For example: if a factory is operating in an industrial zone, neighbours in the neighbouring residential zone can't make a claim in nuisance. Jurisdictions without zoning laws essentially leave land use to be determined by the laws concerning nuisance.

Similarly, modern environmental laws are an adaptation of the doctrine of nuisance to modern complex societies, in that a person's use of his property may harmfully affect another's property, or person, far from the nuisance activity, and from causes not easily integrated into historic understandings of nuisance law.

== Remedies ==
Under the common law, the only remedy for a nuisance was the payment of damages. However, with the development of the courts of equity, the remedy of an injunction became available to prevent a defendant from repeating the activity that caused the nuisance, and specifying punishment for contempt if the defendant is in breach of such an injunction.

The law and economics movement has been involved in analyzing the most efficient choice of remedies given the circumstances of the nuisance. In Boomer v. Atlantic Cement Co. a cement plant interfered with a number of neighbors, yet the cost of complying with a full injunction would have been far more than a fair value of the cost to the plaintiffs of continuation. The New York court allowed the cement plant owner to 'purchase' the injunction for a specified amount—the permanent damages. In theory, the permanent damage amount should be the net present value of all future damages suffered by the plaintiff.

=== Inspector of Nuisances ===
An Inspector of Nuisances was the title of an office in several English-speaking jurisdictions. In many jurisdictions this term is now archaic, the position and/or term having been replaced by others. In medieval England it was an office of the Courts Leet and later it was also a parochial office concerned with local action against a wide range of 'nuisances' under the common law: obstructions of the highway, polluted wells, adulterated food, smoke, noise, smelly accumulations, eavesdropping, peeping toms, lewd behaviour, and many others. In the United Kingdom from the mid- 19th century this office became associated with solving public health and sanitation problems, with other types of nuisances being dealt with by the local constables.

The first Inspector of Nuisances appointed by a UK local authority Health Committee was Thomas Fresh in Liverpool in 1844. Liverpool later promoted a private Act, the Liverpool Sanatory Act 1846, that created a statutory post of Inspector of Nuisances. This became the precedent for later local and national legislation. In local authorities that had established a Board of Health under the Public Health Act 1848 (11 & 12 Vict. c. 63), or under local acts implementing the Towns Improvement Clauses Act 1847, the title was 'Inspector of Nuisances'. The Nuisances Removal and Diseases Prevention Act 1855 and the Metropolis Management Act 1855 (via section 134) mandated such an office but with the title of 'Sanitary Inspector'. So in some places the title was 'Sanitary Inspector' and in others 'Inspector of Nuisances'. Eventually the title was standardized across all UK local authorities as 'Sanitary Inspector'. An act of Parliament in 1956 changed the title to 'Public Health Inspector'. Similar offices were established across the British Commonwealth and Empire.

The nearest modern equivalent of this position in the UK is the environmental health officer. This title being adopted by local authorities on the recommendation of Central Government after the Local Government Act 1972. Today, registered UK environmental health officers working in non-enforcement roles (e.g. in the private sector) may prefer to use the generic term 'environmental health practitioner'.

In New South Wales Australia, the NSW Public Health Act 1896 gave the NSW Board of Health power to establish 'standards of strength and purity for articles of general consumption', to appoint analysts, and 'to cause to be made such enquiries as it thinks fit in relation to any matters concerning the public health'. Inspectors under the new Act were known as Inspectors of Nuisances, but were later renamed 'sanitary inspectors'.

In the United States, a modern example of an officer with the title 'Inspector of Nuisances' but not the public health role is found in Section 3767[7] of the Ohio Revised Code which defines such a position to investigate nuisances, where this term broadly covers establishments in which lewdness and alcohol are found. Whereas in the United States the environmental health officer role is undertaken by local authority officers with the titles 'Registered Environmental Health Specialist' or 'Registered Sanitarian' depending on the jurisdiction.

== Law related to nuisance, by country ==
=== England ===
The boundaries of the tort are potentially unclear, due to the public/private nuisance divide, and existence of the rule in Rylands v Fletcher. Writers such as John Murphy at Lancaster University have popularised the idea that Rylands forms a separate, though related, tort. This is still an issue for debate, and is rejected by others (the primary distinction in Rylands concerns 'escapes onto land', and so it may be argued that the only difference is the nature of the nuisance, not the nature of the civil wrong.)

Under English law, unlike US law, it is no defence that the claimant "came to the nuisance": the 1879 case of Sturges v Bridgman is still good law, and a new owner can bring a claim in nuisance for the existing activities of a neighbour. In February 2014 the UK Supreme Court ruling in the case of Coventry v Lawrence prompted the launch of a campaign to have the "coming to a nuisance" law overturned. Campaigners hold that established lawful activity continuing with planning permission and local residents' support should be accepted as part of the character of the area by any new residents coming to the locality.

=== United States ===
There is perhaps no more impenetrable jungle in the entire law than that which surrounds the word 'nuisance.' It has meant all things to all people, and has been applied indiscriminately to everything from an alarming advertisement to a cockroach baked in a pie. There is general agreement that it is incapable of any exact or comprehensive definition.

— Prosser, W. Page; Keeton, W. Page (1984). Prosser and Keeton on Torts (5th ed.). St. Paul, Minnesota: West Publishing. §§ 86, 616. ISBN 978-0314748805.

Many states have limited instances where a claim of nuisance may be brought. Such limitation often became necessary as the sensibilities of urban dwellers were offended by smells of agricultural waste when they moved to rural locations. For example: many states and provinces have "right to farm" provisions, which allow any agricultural use of land zoned or historically used for agriculture.

There are two classes of nuisance under the American law: a nuisance in fact, or "nuisance per accidens", and a nuisance per se. The classification determines whether the claim goes to the jury, or gets decided by the judge. An alleged nuisance in fact is an issue of fact to be determined by the jury, who will decide whether the thing (or act) in question created a nuisance, by examining its location and surroundings, the manner of its conduct, and other circumstances. A determination that something is a nuisance in fact also requires proof of the act and its consequences.

By contrast, a nuisance per se is "an activity, or an act, structure, instrument, or occupation which is a nuisance at all times and under any circumstances, regardless of location or surroundings." Liability for a nuisance per se is absolute, and injury to the public is presumed; if its existence is alleged and established by proof, it is also established as a matter of law. Therefore, a judge would decide a nuisance per se, while a jury would decide a nuisance in fact.

Most nuisance claims allege a nuisance in fact, for the simple reason that not many actions or structures have been deemed to be nuisances per se. In general, if an act, or use of property, is lawful, or authorized by competent authority, it cannot be a nuisance per se. Rather, the act in question must either be declared by public statute, or by case law, to be a nuisance per se. There are few state or federal statutes or case law declaring actions or structures to be a nuisance in and of themselves. Few activities or structures, in and of themselves and under any and all circumstances, are a nuisance; which is how courts determine whether or not an action or structure is a nuisance per se.

Over the last 1000 years, public nuisance has been used by governmental authorities to stop conduct that was considered quasi-criminal because, although not strictly illegal, it was deemed unreasonable in view of its likelihood to injure someone in the general public. Donald Gifford argues that civil liability has always been an "incidental aspect of public nuisance". Traditionally, actionable conduct involved the blocking of a public roadway, the dumping of sewage into a public river or the blasting of a stereo in a public park. To stop this type of conduct, governments sought injunctions either enjoining the activity that caused the nuisance or requiring the responsible party to abate the nuisance.

In recent decades, however, governments blurred the lines between public and private nuisance causes of action. William Prosser noted this in 1966 and warned courts and scholars against confusing and merging the substantive laws of the two torts. In some states, his warning went unheeded and some courts and legislatures have created vague and ill-defined definitions to describe what constitutes a public nuisance. For example, Florida's Supreme Court has held that a public nuisance is any thing that causes "annoyance to the community or harm to public health."

A contemporary example of a nuisance law in the United States is the Article 40 Bylaw of Amherst, Massachusetts known as the Nuisance House Bylaw. The law is voted on by members of the town at town meetings. The stated purpose of such a law is "In accordance with the Town of Amherst’s Home Rule Authority, and to protect the health, safety, and welfare of the inhabitants of the Town, this bylaw shall permit the Town to impose liability on owners and other responsible persons for the nuisances and harm caused by loud and unruly gatherings on private property and shall discourage the consumption of alcoholic beverages by underage persons at such gatherings."

In practice, the law works so that if one member of the neighborhood feels that there is a neighbor's noise level is annoying or excessively loud, that neighbor is instructed to inform the town police so that they can respond to the location of the noise. "The responding officer has some discretion in how to deal with the noise complaint.... When determining the appropriate response, the officer may take many factors into consideration, such as the severity of the noise, the time of day, whether the residents have been warned before, the cooperation of the residents to address the problem."

The term is also used less formally in the United States to describe the non-meritorious nature of frivolous litigation. A lawsuit may be described as a "nuisance suit", and a settlement a "nuisance settlement", if the defendant pays money to the plaintiff to drop the case primarily to spare the cost of litigation, rather than because the suit would have a significant likelihood of winning.

== Environmental nuisance ==
In the field of environmental science, there are a number of phenomena which are considered nuisances under the law, including most notably noise, water and light pollution. Moreover there are some issues that are not necessarily legal matters that are termed environmental nuisance; for example, an excess population of insects or other vectors may be termed a "nuisance population" in an ecological sense.

In terms of environmental nuisance litigations, it is hard for someone to be successful in this area due to the standing requirements of private and public nuisance. It is the Court's opinion that legislation should regulate this area.

Particularly, in Australia, all the jurisdictions have such kind of legislation.

== From Britannica 1911 ==
A common nuisance is punishable as a misdemeanour at common law, where no special provision is made by statute. In modern times, many of the old common law nuisances have been the subject of legislation. It's no defence for a master or employer that a nuisance is caused by the acts of his servants, if such acts are within the scope of their employment, even though such acts are done without his knowledge, and contrary to his orders. Nor is it a defence that the nuisance has been in existence for a great length of time, for no lapse of time will legitimate a public nuisance.

A private nuisance is an act, or omission, which causes inconvenience or damage to a private person, and is left to be redressed by action. There must be some sensible diminution of these rights affecting the value or convenience of the property. "The real question in all the cases is the question of fact, whether the annoyance is such as materially to interfere with the ordinary comfort of human existence" (Lord Romilly in Crump v. Lambert (1867) L.R. 3 Eq. 409). A private nuisance, differing in this respect from a public nuisance, may be legalized by uninterrupted use for twenty years. It used to be thought that, if a man knew there was a nuisance and went and lived near it, he couldn't recover, because, it was said, it is he that goes to the nuisance, and not the nuisance to him. But this has long ceased to be law, as regards both the remedy by damages, and the remedy by injunction.

The remedy for a public nuisance is by information, indictment, summary procedure or abatement. An information lies in cases of great public importance, such as the obstruction of a navigable river by piers. In some matters, the law allows the party to take the remedy into his own hands, and to "abate" the nuisance. Thus; if a gate be placed across a highway, any person lawfully using the highway may remove the obstruction, provided that no breach of the peace is caused thereby. The remedy for a private nuisance is by injunction, action for damages or abatement. An action lies in every case for a private nuisance; it also lies where the nuisance is public, provided that the plaintiff can prove that he has sustained some special injury. In such a case, the civil is in addition to the criminal remedy. In abating a private nuisance, care must be taken not to do more damage than is necessary for the removal of the nuisance.

In Scotland, there's no recognized distinction between public and private nuisances. The law as to what constitutes a nuisance is substantially the same as in England. A list of statutory nuisances will be found in the Public Health (Scotland) Act 1867 (30 & 31 Vict. c. 101), and amending acts. The remedy for nuisance is by interdict, or action.

== See also ==
- Aldred's Case
- Haslem v. Lockwood
- Law
- Neglect
- Public-order crime
- Robinson v Kilvert
- Rylands v. Fletcher
- Tort law
- William L. Prosser
