= Hughes v Lord Advocate =

1963 Scottish delict case

- Court: House of Lords
- Decided: 21 February 1963
- Citations: [1963] AC 837 [1963] 2 WLR 779 [1963] 1 All ER 705; 1963 SC (HL) 31
- Transcript: Full text of judgment

Court membership
- Judges sitting: Lord Reid; Lord Morris of Borth-y-Gest; Lord Guest; Lord Jenkins; Lord Pearce

Hughes v Lord Advocate [1963] UKHL 8 is an important Scottish delict case decided by the House of Lords on causation. The case is also influential in negligence in the English law of tort (even though English law does not recognise "allurement" per se).

The case's main significance is that, after the shift within the common law of negligence from strict liability to a reasonable standard of care, this case advocated a middle way, namely:

- Even if the loss or harm is not itself foreseeable, liability may arise provided the actual loss falls with a "foreseeable class of harm".

This idea was neither developed nor expanded upon, and only one year later the claimant in Doughty v Turner Manufacturing obtained no remedy via this "middle way". However, the case was followed in subsequent cases on occupiers' liability.

== Facts ==
One evening in November 1958, two boys aged 8 and 10 were walking down Russell Road, Edinburgh where some Post Office workers were repairing cables under the street. The men had opened a manhole and had erected a weather tent over it, with an access ladder inside. From mid-afternoon onwards, the tent had four red paraffin warning lamps. The workmen left around 5pm for a tea break nearby; before leaving, they withdrew the ladder, leaving it outside the tent.

While the workmen were out, the boys arrived and started meddling with the equipment. They picked up one of the lamps and entered the tent. They took the ladder and proceeded to explore the manhole, after which they safely climbed out again. The younger boy tripped over the lamp, which fell into the manhole and broke. The paraffin leaked and vaporised, causing an explosion with flames reaching up to thirty feet. The impact of the blast caused the 8-year old to fall into the hole and suffer severe burn injuries.

The question arose whether the Post Office workers had been negligent in leaving the site unattended with the lamps burning. Under Scots law, they owed a duty of reasonable care to prevent the site becoming an "allurement" for the boys; had they discharged this duty? On the other hand, the children were trespassers and possibly contributorily negligent. A crucial issue was the likelihood (or foreseeability) of the presence of children on Russell Road, and whether the explosion causing the serious burn injuries was of "different type than that could have been foreseeable".

The court of first instance, the First Division of the Court of Session, limited the liability of the Post Office on the grounds that although the danger to children was foreseeable the accident itself was not foreseeable. The defence had argued that the boys were not only trespassers but also contributorily negligent, but the court responded that the Post Office did not have any exclusive interest in the middle of the road to support a claim of trespass; and taking into consideration the youth of the boy, it was agreed that he was NOT contributorily negligent; and these points were dropped on appeal to the House of Lords).

== Judgment on appeal ==
Lord Jenkins affirmed the existence of a duty of care by applying the test formulated by Lord Atkin in Donoghue v. Stevenson, saying: "the Post Office had brought on the public highway apparatus capable of constituting a source of danger to passer-by ... It was therefore their duty that such passerby, "neighbour" in the language of Donoghue v. Stevenson, were, so far as reasonably practicable, protected from the various obstacles or allurements, which the workmen had brought to the site. It is clear that the safety precautions taken by the Post Office did not in this instance measure up to Lord Atkin's test."

Lord Morris stated that "exercising an ordinary, and certainly not an over-exacting, degree of prevention the workmen should have decided, when the tea-break came, that someone had better be left in charge who could repel the intrusion of inquisitive children," thereby casting doubt that the workers had discharged their duty of care.

In both the First Division and in the House of Lords, the defence argued that it was unforeseeable that children might be on Russell Road, "a quiet road, some four hundred yards away from any houses". Lord Morris opined (following the judgement of Lord Ordinary) that "if, of, course, there was no likelihood that children might appear, different considerations would apply. But children did appear, and I find no reason to differ from the conclusion of the Lord Ordinary that the presence of children in the immediate vicinity of the shelter was reasonably to be anticipated."

Lord Guest declared that the burden of proof that the presence of children was unforeseeable lay with the respondent; and on the facts there was insufficient evidence to do this. He found that it was reasonable to anticipate the danger that might arise by meddling children, and that, "... the normal dangers of such children falling into the manhole and injured by a lamp were such that a reasonable man would not have ignored them."

It was accepted that the explosion causing the burns was a result of paraffin leaking from the lamp. According to Lord Reid, the boy's injuries from burns were foreseeable. Although the extent of the injury of burn was greater than might have been expected, this was no defence (Eggshell skull rule). However, if the injury were of a different kind than the foreseeable type the defender might have escaped liability.

Lord Reid continued that as the cause of the accident – the explosion from the paraffin lamp – was known, it left no scope to allege the accident was caused by some unknown source, rather than the fault of the respondent. Lord Reid concluded that the accident in question "was but a variant of foreseeable" and it mattered not it may have arisen in an unforeseeable manner.

Lord Jenkins agreed, finding no justification to hold someone liable if the accident had occurred from the burning of a lamp but not if the lamp had exploded.

Lord Morris argued that the injury suffered by the boy was of a higher degree, but was "of the kind or type of accident which was foreseeable". He said the respondent "should not escape liability just because they could not foresee the exact way" in which the boy might play with the equipment, or the way in which he might get hurt. Allowing the appeal, he found there was a duty owed by the respondent to safeguard the boy against the type or kind of occurrence which in fact happened and which resulted in his injuries, and the defenders are not absolved from liability because they didn't envisage "the precise concatenation of circumstances which lead up to the accident."

Lord Guest pointed out that for making a coherent chain of causation it is not necessary to follow the minute details leading up to the accident to be reasonably foreseeable, but only that "the type of accident caused was of a foreseeable type". He was of the view that the lower courts wrongly gave more emphasis on the fact of the explosion; to Lord Guest, it was a non-essential element. He gave more emphasis on the fact whether the burning of paraffin outside the lamp was a reasonably foreseeable event. The lower courts had already concluded these events as reasonably foreseeable events but they were of the view the explosion was an unforeseeable event. Lord Guest argued this as a "fallacious" claim. Lord Guest concluded that the accident and the injuries sustained by the boys should have been reasonably foreseen by the Post Office employees, who were in breach of duty to take adequate protection against the accident.

Lord Pearce cited the case of The Wagon Mound (No. 1) which held that a person is not liable if the accident is of a different type than the type which was foreseen by the person. It would be unjust to check each and every detail of the foreseeability test too minutely when the case deals with things that can be an allurement to children leading to an accident and hard to foresee the exact way in which the accident may take place.

In sum, all judges allowed the boy's appeal. The decision was followed in Jolley v Sutton London Borough Council,

(For a similar case arising under US law, see Palsgraf v. Long Island Railroad, a case which had been influential upon the court in Donoghue v Stevenson).

== See also ==
- Remoteness in English law
- Occupiers' liability in English law
- Occupiers' Liability Act 1957
- Occupiers' Liability Act 1984
- Glasgow Corporation v Taylor [1922] 1 AC 44 - a case on allurement.
- Premises liability
