= Re Polemis & Furness, Withy & Co Ltd =

English legal case involving negligence

- Court: Court of Appeal of England and Wales
- Decided: 1921
- Citation: [1921] 3 KB 560

Re Polemis & Furness, Withy & Co Ltd [1921] 3 KB 560 is an English tort case on causation and remoteness in the law of negligence.

The Court of Appeal held that a defendant can be deemed liable for all consequences flowing from his negligent conduct regardless of how unforeseeable such consequences are. The case is an example of strict liability, a concept which has generally fallen out of favour with the common law courts. The case was superseded by The Wagon Mound (No 1), which set a remoteness test based on reasonable foreseeability of harm.

== Facts ==
Defendant's stevedore employees were loading cargo into a ship. An employee negligently caused a plank to fall into the ship's hold. The plank caused a spark, which ignited some petrol vapour in the hold, causing an explosion that resulted in the ship becoming a total loss. The matter was taken to arbitration.

== Judgment ==
The arbitrator found that the defendant's negligence caused the plank to fall, and the falling plank caused the fire. The arbitrators awarded damages to the plaintiff. The defendant appealed.

The Court of Appeal affirmed that the defendant was liable. Although the fire itself may not have been foreseeable, it was held that the defendant would nevertheless be liable for all direct consequences of his actions. The court reasoned that if the act would or might probably cause damage, the fact that the damage it in fact causes is not the exact kind of damage one would expect is immaterial, so long as the damage is in fact directly traceable to the negligent act and not due to the operation of independent causes.

== Significance ==
Although the stevedore would have foreseen that careless loading might cause some damage to the workers, cargo, or the ship, it was beyond probability that the actual total loss would occur, yet the defendant was held fully liable.

The Re Polemis decision was disapproved of, and its test replaced, in the later decision of the Privy Council in the Wagon Mound (No. 1) [1961]. Re Polemis has yet to be overruled by an English court and is still technically "good law". However, it was disapproved by the Privy Council, whose decisions are not binding but are strongly persuasive on English courts. The upshot is that the strict liability principle in Re Polemis has not been followed, and the case may be considered "bad law".

- The move away from strict liability meant that it was more likely that a defendant would not be liable, and the Scots court in Hughes v Lord Advocate tried to find a middle way. It created the concept of "foreseeability of the class of harm"; that is, one need not foresee the actual harm, provided one could foresee a "class of harm" into which the unforeseeable result fell. Happily, this allowed two young boys who had suffered burns to be compensated; but in the English case of Doughty v Turner Manufacturing the claimant was less favoured: this factory worker who was injured in an eruption when a fellow employee careless dropped a lid into a vat of hot liquid was unable to recover as the court held that whist "splashing" was foreseeable, the actual "eruption" fell outside the "foreseeable class of harm".
- Since 1932, defendants will be liable in negligence only if could have been foreseen that the breach of the duty of care towards the claimant would cause loss, damage or injury.

An exception that still applies is the talem qualem rule, (or "eggshell skull rule") in cases of additional results of intentional illegal harm, to personal injury, as in Smith v Leech Brain.

== See also ==
- English tort law
- Negligence per se
- Palsgraf v. Long Island Railroad Co.
- Greenland v Chaplin (1850) 5 Ex 243, Pollock CB advocates foreseeability
- Smith v The London and South Western Railway Company (1870–71) LR 6 CP 14, directness test held to prevail
- Wright, Re Polemis, 14 Mod. L. Rev. 393 (Oct. 1951) – article by counsel in the case, "summarising the history of the doctrine . . . and the conflicting points of view."
