= Comprehensive Cover =

Level of motor insurance

Comprehensive Cover is the highest level of cover a person can have if they take out motor insurance in the United Kingdom. In recent years, Comprehensive Cover has actually become cheaper than the lesser cover 'Third Party, Fire and Theft' Cover in most cases.

By taking out Comprehensive Cover, people in the United Kingdom are not only covered for third party claims after an incident, they are also covered for damage caused to their own vehicle or building (examples include: fire, fallen trees, flooding).

== Overview ==
Depending on the policy there would be different excess payments made to the garage that repairs the vehicle, and insurers normally need to authorise the estimate before repairs can proceed. Once the authorised garage has completed the repairs, the policyholder would then pay that garage their excess payment and the insurers would pay the remainder.

If the case was non-fault, the insurance company would then chase their financial losses from the other insurance company that they felt were at fault. In some cases, they could be unsuccessful, or due to the lack of evidence only manage to agree 50/50 split and get half their losses back. In some cases the insured would have legal cover to help them recover their own financial un-insured losses, the excess would be included on that.

Insurance Cover
Types
Third Party, Fire & Theft Cover
COMPREHENSIVE COVER
Third Party Only Cover
RTA Insurer
Article 75 Insurer

== See also ==
- National Insurance Fund
