= Administrative liability in English law =

Administrative liability in English law is an area of law concerning the tortious liability of public bodies in English law. The existence of private law tort applying to public bodies is a result of Diceyan constitutional theory suggesting that it would be unfair if a separate system of liability existing for government and officials. Therefore, a public body which acts ultra vires is liable in tort is a cause of action can be established just like any individual would be. An ultra vires action will not, per se, give rise to damages Therefore, a claimant will have to fit into one of the recognised private law courses of action. These areas in which a public body can incur private liability in tort were described by Lord Browne Wilkinson in X v Bedfordshire County Council [1995] 3 All ER 353 (HL).

- 1. Breach of a statutory duty
- 2. An action for breach of a common law duty of care
- 3. Misfeasance in public office

It is not enough that there is a careless performance of a statutory duty in the absence of any other common law right of action.

== Breach of statutory duty ==
For an action for breach of statutory duty to succeed:

- 1. The Court must believe that this accords with the intention of Parliament.
- 2. The plaintiff must fall within the class of persons that the statute was supposed to protect.
- 3. The plaintiff must suffer consequential damage.
- 4. There must be no other possible remedy.

== Breach of a common law duty of care (negligence) ==
It is possible for a public authority to be liable in the law of negligence. There can be no liability here for mere carelessness performance of a statutory duty or power in the absence of any other common law right of action.

A policy/operational distinction was once apparent in the court's reasoning. They suggested that they are more willing to attach liability to an act or omission of a public authority where the duty of care claimed emerges from the operation of the public authority rather than the policy pursued by it. So, for example, in the Dorset Yacht case the House of Lords decided that if the damage caused by a group of “borstal boys” had been the result of a policy decision to grant them greater freedom, it would not be actionable. If it were actionable, it would require the assessment of the policy, its impact on young offenders, the public, and public resources, a task which the court could not undertake. However, liability could be found where the public authority had been negligent in the exercise of the policy (i.e. negligent in the context of allowing greater freedom to young offenders). This reasoning was also adopted in the case of Anns v Merton. On the one hand, if the claimant had suffered damage as a result of a faulty inspection, that would be actionable operational negligence. On the other hand, it would be insufficient to show that structural flaws in the property would have been found if more inspections had taken place, if the lack of inspections was the result of a policy by the public authority. In the latter case the claim would not be actionable. However, the distinction now plays a relatively minor role in definition the duty of care owed by public authorities. The distinction now forms just one factor in deciding whether a decision is justiciable or non-justiciable, which is a decision to be taken by the court regardless of the views of the public authority itself. It is now more common to limit public authority liability on the basis of other factors.

The test for liability in negligence laid down in Anns v Merton (concerning the liability of both public and private defendants) was disapproved in the subsequent case of Caparo Industries v Dickman, with the result that the extent of the duty of care of public authority defends would primarily result from asking whether it would be "fair, just and reasonable" to impose liability. In relation to public authority defendants, a wide range of factors would be considered including relevant statutes and a wide range of policy factors. The role of justiciability is therefore much less significant, although it can still influence a decision on whether liability is fair, just and reasonable.

The extent of liability in different areas has therefore been decided by a string of cases examining where it would be fair, just and reasonable to impose liability. In Hill v Chief Constable of West Yorkshire, it was decided that the police owed no general duty of care to potential victims of crime. A determining factor was that the House of Lords believed that it was the discretion of a chief police officer to decide how available resources should be deployed and which leads should be acted upon and which possibilities ruled out. The House was also not prepared to risk the possibility of encouraging "defensive" policing whereby the police would shun any potential for liability even where to do so would further the case. The court in Capital and Counties plc v Hampshire County Council decided that a fire brigade only owed a duty of care to the owners of the property to which it responded to avoid doing damage to the property which would not otherwise occur. In this instance, the relationship was insufficiently proximate, another, separate, requirement of Caparo test. This conclusion was extended also to the coastguard in an analogous case.

== Misfeasance in public office ==
Misfeasance in public office is considered to be a special kind of public law tort. It occurs when there is a malicious or deliberate exercise or non-exercise of a statutory or common law power by an official which causes loss to a plaintiff which has been foreseen.

== Key cases ==
- Anns v Merton London Borough Council
- Home Office v Dorset Yacht
- X and others (minors) v Bedfordshire County Council

== See also ==
- English tort law
- United Kingdom administrative law
