= Sturges v Bridgman =

Case in nuisance law, 1879

- Court: Court of Appeal
- Decided: 1 July 1879
- Citation: (1879) LR 11 Ch D 852

Case opinions
- Thesiger LJ

Keywords
- Nuisance

Sturges v Bridgman (1879) LR 11 Ch D 852 is a landmark case in nuisance decided by the Court of Appeal of England and Wales. It decides that what constitutes reasonable use of one's property depends on the character of the locality, and that it is no defence that the plaintiff "came to the nuisance".

== Facts ==
A doctor moved next door to a confectioner, who had produced sweets for sale in his kitchen for many years. The doctor constructed a small shed for the purpose of private practice. He built the shed on the boundary. However, the loud noises from the confectioner's industrial mortars and pestles could be clearly heard, disrupting his use and enjoyment of his land. He sought an injunction. The facts were described by Thesiger LJ in the Court of Appeal as follows,

The Defendant in this case is the occupier, for the purpose of his business as a confectioner, of a house in Wigmore Street. In the rear of the house is a kitchen, and in that kitchen there are now, and have been for over twenty years, two large mortars in which the meat and other materials of the confectionery are pounded. The Plaintiff, who is a physician, is the occupier of a house in Wimpole Street, which until recently had a garden at the rear, the wall of which garden was a party-wall between the Plaintiff’s and the Defendant’s premises, and formed the back wall of the Defendant’s kitchen. The Plaintiff has, however, recently built upon the site of the garden a consulting-room, one of the side walls of which is the wall just described. It has been proved that in the case of the mortars, before and at the time of action brought, a noise was caused which seriously inconvenienced the Plaintiff in the use of his consulting-room, and which, unless the Defendant had acquired a right to impose the inconvenience, would constitute an actionable nuisance. The Defendant contends that he had acquired the right, either at common Law or under the Prescription Act, by uninterrupted user for more than twenty years.

== Judgment ==
The Court of Appeal held that the fact the doctor had "come to the nuisance", by which the Judge meant moved to an area where the nuisance had been operating for years without harming anyone, was no defence. The doctor's legal right to have the nuisance stopped was not lessened by the confectioner's longstanding practice. The text of Thesiger LJ's judgment follows.

In deciding this answer one more fact is necessary to be stated. Prior to the erection of the consulting-room no material annoyance or inconvenience was caused to the Plaintiff or to any previous occupier of the Plaintiff’s house by what the Defendant did. It is true that the Defendant in the 7th paragraph of his affidavit speaks of an invalid lady who occupied the house upon one occasion, about thirty years before, requested him if possible to discontinue the use of the mortars before eight o’clock in the morning; and it is true also that there is some evidence of the garden wall having been subjected to vibration, but this vibration, even if it existed at all, was so slight, and the complaint, if it could be called a complaint, of the invalid lady, and can be looked upon as evidence, was of so trifling a character, that, upon the maxim de minimis non curat lex, we arrive at the conclusion that the Defendant’s acts would not have given rise to any proceedings either at law or in equity. Here then arises the objection to the acquisition by the Defendant of any easement. That which was done by him was in its nature such that it could not be physically interrupted; it could not at the same time be put a stop to by action, Can user which is neither preventible nor actionable found an easement?.

We think not. The question, so far as regards this particular easement claimed, is the same question whether the Defendant endeavours to assert his right by Common Law or under the Prescription Act. That Act fixes periods for the acquisition of easements, but, except in regard to the particular easement of light, or in regard to certain matters which are immaterial to the present inquiry, it does not alter the character of easements, or of the user or enjoyment by which they are acquired. This being so, the laws governing the acquisition of easements by user stands thus: Consent or acquiescence of the owner of the servient tenement lies at the root of prescription, and of the fiction of a lost grant, and hence the acts or user, which go to the proof of either the one or the other, must be, in the language of the civil law, nec vi nec clam nec precario; for a man cannot, as a general rule, be said to consent to or acquiesce in the acquisition by his neighbour of an easement through an enjoyment of which he has no knowledge, actual or constructive, or which he contests and endeavours to interrupt, or which he temporarily licenses. It is a mere extension of the same notion, or rather it is a principle into which by strict analysis it may be resolved, to hold, that an enjoyment which a man cannot prevent raises no presumption of consent or acquiescence. Upon this principle it was decided in Webb v Bird that currents of air blowing from a particular quarter of the compass, and in Chasemore v Richards that subterranean water percolating through the strata in no known channels, could not be acquired as an easement by user; and in Angus v Dalton a case of lateral support of buildings by adjacent soil, which came on appeal to this Court, the principle was in no way impugned, although it was held by the majority of the Court not to be applicable so as to prevent the acquisition of that particular easement. It is a principle which must be equally appropriate to the case of affirmative as of negative easements; in other words, it is equally unreasonable to imply your consent to your neighbour enjoying something which passes from your tenement to his, as to his subjecting your tenement to something which comes from his, when in both cases you have no power of prevention. But the affirmative easement differs from the negative easement in this, that the latter can under no circumstances be interrupted except by acts done upon the servient tenement, but the former, constituting, as it does, a direct interference with the enjoyment by the servient owner of his tenement, may be the subject of legal proceedings as well as of physical interruption. To put concrete cases—the passage of light and air to your neighbour's windows may be physically interrupted by you, but gives you no legal grounds of complaint against him. The passage of water from his land on to yours may be physically interrupted, or may be treated as a trespass and made the ground of action for damages, or for an injunction, or both. Noise is similar to currents of air and the flow of subterranean and uncertain streams in its practical incapability of physical interruption, but it differs from them in its capability of grounding an action. Webb v Bird and Chase-more v Richards are not, therefore, direct authorities governing the present case. They are, however, illustrations of the principle which ought to govern it; for until the noise, to take this case, became an actionable nuisance, which it did not at any time before the consulting-room was built, the basis of the presumption of the consent, viz., the power of prevention physically or by action, was never present.

It is said that if this principle is applied in cases like the present, and were carried out to its logical consequences, it would result in the most serious practical inconveniences, for a man might go—say into the midst of the tanneries of Bermondsey, or into any other locality devoted to a particular trade or manufacture of a noisy or unsavoury character, and, by building a private residence upon a vacant piece of land, put a stop to such trade or manufacture altogether. The case also is put of a blacksmith’s forge built away from all habitations, but to which, in course of time, habitations approach. We do not think that either of these hypothetical cases presents any real difficulty.

As regards the first, it may be answered that whether anything is a nuisance or not is a question to be determined, not merely by an abstract consideration of the thing itself, but in reference to its circumstances; what would be a nuisance in Belgrave Square would not necessarily be so in Bermondsey; and where a locality is devoted to a particular trade or manufacture carried on by the traders or manufacturers in a particular and established manner not constituting a public nuisance, Judges and juries would be justified in finding, and may be trusted to find, that the trade or manufacture so carried on in that locality is not a private or actionable wrong. As regards the blacksmith's forge, that is really an idem per idem case with the present. It would be on the one hand in a very high degree unreasonable and undesirable that there should be a right of action for acts which are not in the present condition of the adjoining land, and possibly never will be any annoyance or inconvenience to either its owner or occupier; and it would be on the other hand in an equally degree unjust, and, from a public point of view, inexpedient that the use and value of the adjoining land should, for all time and under all circumstances, be restricted and diminished by reason of the continuance of acts incapable of physical interruption, and which the law gives no power to prevent. The smith in the case supposed might protect himself by taking a sufficient curtilage to ensure what he does from being at any time an annoyance to his neighbour, but the neighbour himself would be powerless in the matter. Individual cases of hardship may occur in the strict carrying out of the principle upon which we found our judgment, but the negation of the principle would lead even more to individual hardship, and would at the same time produce a prejudicial effect upon the development of land for residential purposes. The Master of the Rolls in the Court below took substantially the same view of the matter as ourselves and granted the relief which the Plaintiff prayed for, and we are of opinion that his order is right and should be affirmed, and that this appeal should be dismissed with costs.

== See also ==
- Robinson v Kilvert (1889) LR 41 ChD 88
