= English tort law =

Branch of law

Tort law concerns civil wrongs, damaging people's rights to health and safety, property, or a clean environment. Most accidents have become strictly regulated, and may require insurance, for workplaces, road accidents, products, or environmental harm such as the Deepwater Horizon oil spill.

English tort law concerns the compensation for harm to people's rights to health and safety, a clean environment, property, their economic interests, or their reputations. A "tort" is a wrong in civil law, rather than criminal law, that usually requires a payment of money to make up for damage that is caused. Alongside contracts and unjust enrichment, tort law is usually seen as forming one of the three main pillars of the law of obligations.

In English law, torts like other civil cases are generally tried in front a judge without a jury.

== History ==
Following Roman law, the English system has long been based on a closed system of nominate torts, such as trespass, battery and conversion. This is in contrast to continental legal systems, which have since adopted more open systems of tortious liability. There are various categories of tort, which lead back to the system of separate causes of action. The tort of negligence is however increasing in importance over other types of tort, providing a wide scope of protection, especially since Donoghue v Stevenson. For liability under negligence, a duty of care must be established owed to a group of persons to which the victim belongs, a nebulous concept into which many other categories are being pulled.

== Negligence ==
Liability for negligence arises when one person breaches a duty of care owed to another. The main elements of negligence are:

1. A duty of care (see Donoghue v Stevenson)
2. Breach of that duty (see Nettleship v Weston)
3. Breach causing harm in fact (see Smith v Leech Brain & Co.)
4. The harm must be not too remote a consequence of the breach (see The Wagon Mound (No. 2))

In some situations, defences will be available to negligence. Special rules, and considerable bodies of case law have developed around four further particular fields in negligence: for psychiatric injury, economic loss, for public bodies, and when concerning omissions and third parties.

=== Duty of care ===
The establishment of a duty of care is usually broken up into a three-step test. The first case to establish a general duty of care was Donoghue v Stevenson. Famously, Mrs Donoghue claimed compensation for illness after she consumed a ginger beer containing a decomposed snail in a public house in Paisley, Scotland. The bottle was opaque so neither Mrs Donoghue nor the shopkeeper could see a snail, and at the time she could not sue the shopkeeper for breach of contract or consumer rights. The House of Lords by a majority held that the manufacturer, Mr Stevenson, was liable in tort. Lord Atkin held liability was "based upon a general public sentiment of moral wrongdoing for which the offender must pay" and people "must take reasonable care to avoid acts or omissions which you can reasonably foresee would be likely to injure your neighbour." By contrast, Lord Macmillan suggested that the law should protect Mrs Donoghue by incremental analogy to previous cases. Nevertheless, Lord Atkin's speech was widely followed and was understood to contain three main points for establishing a duty of care. First, the concept of reasonable foreseeability of harm; second, the claimant and the defendant being in a relationship of proximity; third, and more loosely, it being fair, just and reasonable to impose liability on the defendant for his careless actions. This three-step scheme (also known as the tripartite or threefold test), however, did not crystallise until the case of Caparo Industries Plc v Dickman. A company called Caparo took over another company by buying up a majority of its shares. It did this because it obtained word from a company audit that the target was financially sound. The audit was prepared by a group of accountants (Dickman) and was intended for shareholders, not outsiders. Once Caparo owned the company it found that the finances were in fact pretty shoddy, and so it sued the accountants for being negligent in its audit preparation. The House of Lords found against Caparo and established the current threefold test. Although it was "reasonably foreseeable" that outsiders might learn of the carelessly prepared information, it was not the case that Caparo and Dickman were in a relationship of "proximity". This the court used as a term of art (note, this is different from the American use of the word) to say that it should not be the case that absolutely anyone who heard something said that was stupid and acted on it can sue. The court was reacting to its concern that to allow a claim here might open the floodgates of litigation. The third element, whether liability would be "fair, just and reasonable", was an extra hurdle added as a catch-all discretionary measure for the judiciary to block further claims.

- Robinson v Chief Constable of West Yorkshire Police [2018] UKSC 4, found that the police owed a duty of care to a passer-by who was injured when they tried to arrest a drug-dealer
- James-Bowen v Commissioner of Police of the Metropolis [2018] UKSC 40, rejected claim by police officers charged but acquitted of assaulting a prisoner for damage to their reputations

=== Breach of duty ===
Once a duty of care has been established, it must be shown that a duty has been breached. The question the courts ask is whether the behaviour exhibited by the defendant fell below the threshold of a "reasonable man" (the objective test). In some cases where the defendant was in a special profession, e.g. being a doctor, the court will ask what standard of care a "reasonable doctor" or the like might have done. Allowance is usually made for the defendants age and a lower standard of a "reasonable child of a certain age" is applied to children. On the other hand, no allowance is made for other personal circumstances, such as the fact that the defendant was inexperienced in the task he set out to perform. He is expected to perform this task as a reasonably skilled and competent person.

- Montgomery v Lanarkshire Health Board [2015] UKSC 11

=== Causation and remoteness ===
Causation is complex, and is usually discussed in two parts. Simple causation is a question of whether "but for" the action by the defendant harm would have resulted. There has been some deal of discussion over whether a contributory cause is enough, and a variety of supplementary tests have been developed (e.g. the material contribution to risk and material damage to damage tests), often to deal specifically with a particular area of liability (asbestos cases, for instance).

- Barnett v Kensington & Chelsea NHS Trust
- McGhee v National Coal Board
- Bolitho v City and Hackney Health Authority
- Fairchild v Glenhaven Funeral Services Ltd
- Gregg v Scott

After a causal link has been properly established, the courts may still deny compensation if the harm was a very remote consequence of the initial wrong. So long as a type of damage is foreseeable, however, the manner in which it occurred – however remote – is of no concern to the courts.

- Scott v Shepherd (1773) 96 ER 525
- Re Polemis and Furness, Withy & Co [1921] 3 KB 560
- Wagon Mound (No.1) [1961] AC 388
- Hughes v Lord Advocate [1963] AC 837

=== Defences ===
Finding a successful defence absolves the defendant from full or partial liability for damages, which makes them valuable commodities in the court. There are three main defences to tortious liability; to argue the claimant voluntarily undertook the risk of his harm, that he contributed to the harm, or that he engaged in illegal activity.

Volenti non fit injuria is Latin for "to the willing, no injury is done". It operates when the claimant either expressly or implicitly consents to the risk of loss or damage. For example, if a regular spectator at an ice hockey match is injured when a player strikes the puck in the ordinary course of play, causing it to fly out of the rink and hit him or her, this is a foreseeable event and regular spectators are assumed to accept that risk of injury when buying a ticket. A slightly more limited defence may arise where the defendant has been given a warning, whether expressly to the plaintiff/claimant or by a public notice, sign or otherwise, that there is a danger of injury. The extent to which defendants can rely on notices to exclude or limit liability varies from country to country. This is an issue of policy as to whether defendants should not only warn of a known danger, but also take active steps to fence the site and take other reasonable precautions to prevent the known danger from befalling those foreseen to be at risk.

Contributory negligence is a mitigatory defence, whereby a claimant's damages are reduced in accordance with the percentage of contribution made by the claimant to the loss or damage suffered. Thus, in evaluating a collision between two vehicles, for example, if the wronged driver were not wearing a seatbelt, he would most likely be contributorily negligent. The court will then quantify the damages for the actual loss or damage sustained, and then reduce the amount paid to the claimant by 20%. Contributory negligence can also function as a full defence, when it is assessed at 100%, as in Jayes v IMI Kynoch.

Ex turpi causa non oritur actio is the illegality defence, the Latin for "no right of action arises from a despicable cause". If the claimant is involved in wrongdoing at the time the alleged negligence occurred, this may extinguish or reduce the defendant's liability. Thus, if a burglar is verbally challenged by the property owner and sustains injury when jumping from a second story window to escape apprehension, there is no cause of action against the property owner even though that injury would not have been sustained "but for" the property owner's intervention. However, a trespasser may be able to recover damages due to the unsafe state of the premises (see Occupiers' Liability below).

- Titchener v British Railways Board

=== Psychiatric injury ===
Historically, English courts have been reluctant to allow claims for nervous shock. Early claims involved ladies who suffered what the courts referred to as a "malady of the mind". It was not expected for men to succumb to such problems.

Today, courts are considerably less cautious but additional hurdles are still imposed upon claimants under certain circumstances. The following criteria must be satisfied:

- The injury must have been an event caused by the defendant – the defendant must have owed a duty of care to the claimant, but not a unilateral duty covering every eventuality, and it must have been precisely identified what duty was owed and whether the harm could have been foreseen.
- The claimant must have been involved in the injury (i.e. proximity must be demonstrated).
- The event must have caused a recognised psychiatric injury (e.g. pathological grief (Vernon v Bosley) or post-traumatic stress disorder (Leach v Chief Constable of Gloucestershire).

The courts had been cautious for a number of reasons, including the fear of floodgates (indeterminate liability), potential for fraud (brought on by people exaggerating their claims), problems of proof and diagnosis (including the costs of expert opinion), psychiatric illness may be considered less serious than physical harm, the claimant is often a secondary victim, and finally, the courts argued that Parliament is better suited to dealing with this area.

In the case of Dulieu v White [1901] 2 KB 669, the claimant, Mrs Dulieu, was working in a public house. While she was serving, the defendant negligently drove his horse-drawn van into the bar. She suffered shock which resulted in a miscarriage, and she sued the defendant. Mr White was held liable for causing nervous shock resulting in miscarriage, as the claimant reasonably believed herself to be in danger.

Similarly, in Page v Smith [1995] AC 155, it was held that Mr Smith was liable for causing Mr Page psychiatric injury (chronic fatigue syndrome) after a car crash, because Mr Smith could have reasonably foreseen that Mr Page would suffer physical injury for the crash. So liability for causing psychiatric injury depends on the foreseeability of the physical injury, as long as the psychiatric illness is medically recognised.

In Young v Charles Church (Southern LTD)(1997) 39 BMLR 146, the claimant was a "participant" in the event (i.e. a primary victim – Evans & Hitchinson LJJ). He and Mr Cook were raising scaffolding poles in an area that was not secured by the employers; the power lines were not switched off. Mr Cook touched a pole to the electric wiring and suffered a horrific death which caused Mr Young great distress. Even though he never feared for the loss of his own life, the court held that Mr Young was in the area of potential damage, so he was entitled to claim compensation.

Finally, in McLoughlin v Jones [2002] QB 1312, there was an allegation that Mr McLoughlin was a bad landlord, threatening and beating up tenants to get their rent from them in cash. He was charged for a criminal offence and sentenced to prison. He claimed that his solicitors (Jones and Others) had acted without the evidence, especially the witness statement of a person who knew that Mr McLoughlin was not present when the beatings allegedly took place. It soon became apparent that he was actually an upstanding member of society and he suffered psychiatric injury as a result of the imprisonment and loss of reputation. (Note that solicitors have a pre-existing duty of care towards their clients.)

The case of Alcock v Chief Constable of South Yorkshire Police established a three factors for a secondary victim to succeed:

- Foreseeability – there must be a close relationship of love and affection between the secondary victim and the primary victim. This is presumed in the case of spouses and between parents and children, but must be demonstrated in all others.
- Proximity – there must be temporal and spatial proximity between the claimant and the accident.
- How the accident was caused, or proximity of perception.

Case law where this test has been applied includes McLoughlin v O'Brian [1983] AC 410, in which the husband and children of the claimant were involved in a car accident that was caused by the negligence of the defendant. The claimant found out about the accident an hour later and, when she got to the hospital two hours later, one child had already died. She saw her husband and children suffering and suffered shock, depression and a change of personality. The court established a spectrum of proximity; a pedestrian should be able to withstand seeing the accidents that occur in everyday life, but a family member of the victims will inevitably suffer greater emotional harm. Nonetheless, simply seeing the aftermath of the accident and not witnessing it is insufficient proximity. Similarly, seeing a video of the accident is insufficient.

Alcock v Chief Constable of South Yorkshire Police (1992) HL was a test case in the aftermath of the Hillsborough disaster, where 95 spectators were crushed to death and 400 injured in a stadium. The event was televised and broadcast on radio. In Alcock, claims for damages for psychiatric illness were brought by fifteen relatives of the victims of the tragedy; some of them had been present at the match – but not in the area where the disaster occurred – and others had seen it on television or heard it on the radio. The Chief Constable of South Yorkshire Police denied that the claimants were owed a duty of care. On the basis of the three exclusion criteria mentioned above, all claims were ruled out.

=== Assumption of responsibility ===
Assumption of responsibility arises when there is a professional relationship between parties, such as between a solicitor or an architect and their client.

- Hedley Byrne & Co Ltd v Heller & Partners Ltd [1964] AC 465
- Steel v NRAM Ltd (formerly NRAM Plc) [2018] UKSC 13

=== Pure economic loss ===
- Spartan Steel & Alloys Ltd v Martin & Co (Contractors) Ltd [1973] QB 27
- Murphy v Brentwood District Council [1991] 1 AC 398
- Aswan Engineering Establishment Co v Lupdine Ltd [1987] 1 WLR 1
- Smith v Eric S Bush [1990] 1 AC 831

=== Omissions and third parties ===
- Smith v Littlewoods Organisation Ltd [1987] UKHL 18
- Stovin v Wise [1996] UKHL 15

=== Public bodies ===
- Anns v Merton London Borough Council
- Home Office v Dorset Yacht
- Chief Constable of Hertfordshire Police v Van Colle [2008] UKHL 50
- Michael v The Chief Constable of South Wales Police [2015] UKSC 2
- Commissioner of Police of the Metropolis v DSD [2018] UKSC 11

== Strict and specific torts ==
While negligence actions set a general groundwork, many further fields of tort have developed their own identity or, where judicial decision-making was seen as insufficient by Parliament, through statutory reform. Major statutory torts concern food safety, health and safety and environmental law. For example, liability under the Nuclear Installations Act 1965, the Merchant Shipping Act 1995, or liability imposed on utility (gas and electricity) companies to ensure the safety of their products, all of which are strict liability. While a statute has said nothing specific, a tortious duty may have arisen. This will be a question of statutory interpretation (e.g. Stovin v Wise [1996] AC 923).

=== Product liability ===
In consumer protection, with the Product Liability Directive in the European Union, where businesses making defective products that harm people must pay for any damage resulting. Liability for defective products is strict (see strict liability) in most jurisdictions. The theory of risk spreading provides support for this approach. Since manufacturers are the 'cheapest cost avoiders', because they have a greater chance to seek out problems, it makes sense to give them the incentive to guard against product defects.

=== Workplace safety ===
One of the principal terms that accompanies the employment relationship is that the employer will provide a "safe system of work". As the industrial revolution developed, accidents from a hazardous working environment were a front line target for labour legislation, as a series of Factories Acts, from 1802, required minimum standards in workplace cleanliness, ventilation, fencing machinery, not to mention restrictions on child labour and limits to the working day. These Acts typically targeted particular kinds of workplaces, such as mines, or textile mills, before the more generalised approach took hold now seen in the Factories Act 1961. That applies to any workplace where an article is made or changed, or animals are kept and slaughtered. The Employer's Liability (Defective Equipment) Act 1969 made employers automatically liable for equipment with defects supplied by third parties. Because isolated employees lack the technical skill, time, training to litigate, such regulation's primary line of enforcement was through inspectors or agencies before matters went to court. Today the Health and Safety at Work etc. Act 1974, enforced by the Health and Safety Executive, is the main law. The HSE can delegate enforcement to local authorities, whose inspectors have the power to investigate and require changes to workplace systems. In addition, HSWA 1974 section 2 foresees that employees will set up their own workplace committees, elected by the employees and with the power to codetermine health and safety matters with management. Spelling out the general duties found in HSWA 1974, are a set of health and safety regulations, which must also stay in line with the European-wide harmonised requirements of the Health and Safety Directive.

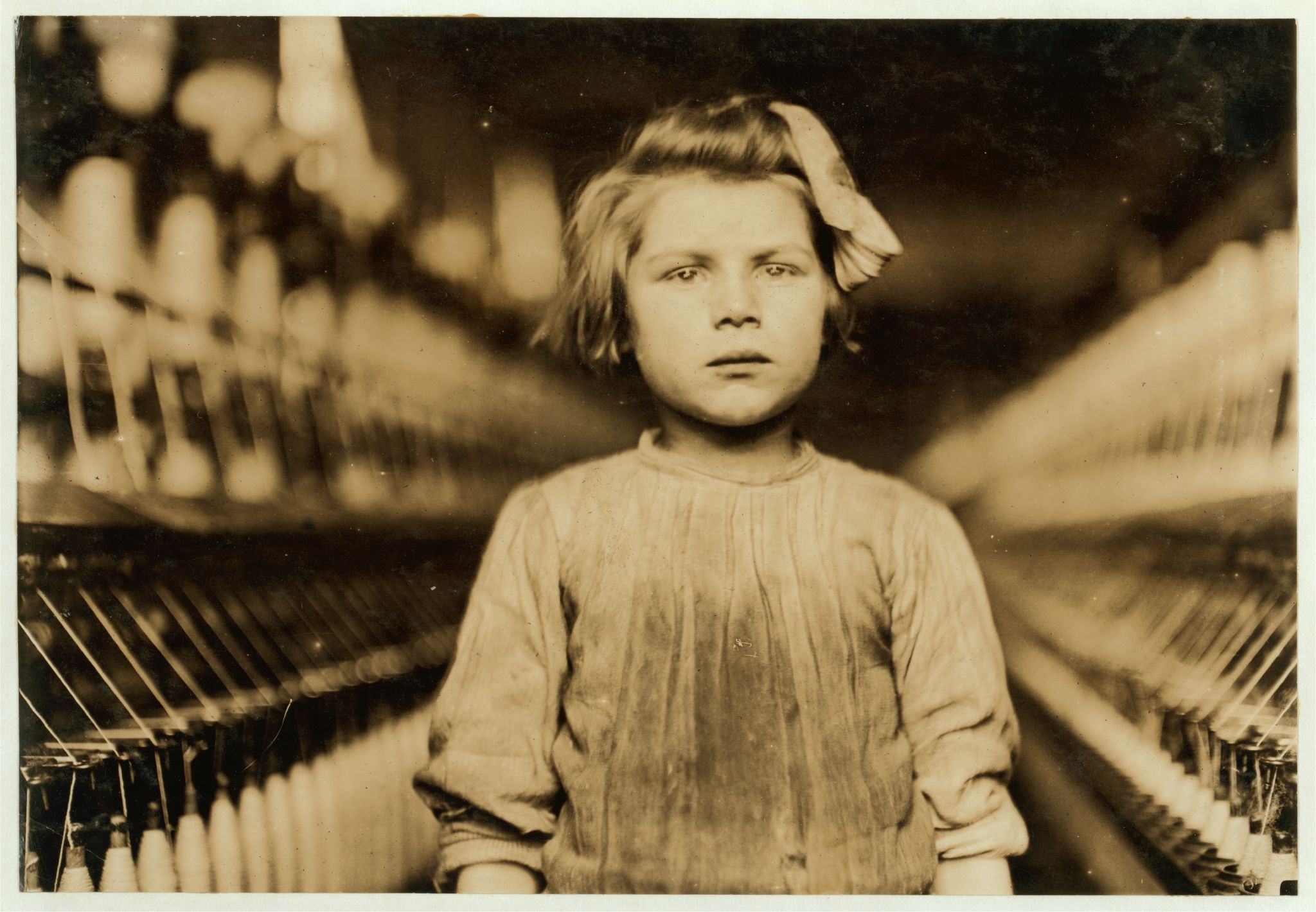
19th century regulation limited child labour and working time in factories and mines, but employers were not always liable for accidents until 1937.

While the modern scheme of legislation and regulation engenders a comprehensive approach to enforcement and worker participation for health and safety matters, the common law remains relevant for getting civil law compensation, and some limits on an employers' duties. Although the legislative provisions are not automatic, breach of a statutory duty is evidence that a civil law duty has been breached. Injured employees can generally claim for loss of income, and relatives or dependents recover small sums to reflect distress. In principle, employers are vicariously liable for all actions of people acting for them in the "course of employment" whenever their actions have a "close connection" to the job, and even if it breaks an employer's rules. Only if an employee is on a "frolic of his own", and the employer cannot be said to have placed him in a position to cause harm, will the employer have a defence. Under the Employers’ Liability (Compulsory Insurance) Act 1969, employers must take out insurance for all injury costs, and insurance companies are precluded by law and practice from suing their employees to recover costs unless there is fraud. However, until the mid-20th century there were a series of major limitations. First, until 1937, if an employee was injured by a co-worker, the doctrine of common employment, the employer could only be liable if it was shown they were personally liable by carelessness in selecting staff. The House of Lords changed this in Wilsons & Clyde Coal Co Ltd v English, holding an employer had a non-delegable duty of care for all employees. Lord Wright held there were "fundamental obligations of a contract of employment... for which employers are absolutely responsible". The second old restriction was that, until 1891, volenti non fit injuria meant workers were assumed to voluntarily accept the dangers of their work by agreeing to their contracts of employment. Only if an employee callously ignores clear directions of the employer will he be taken to have voluntarily assumed the risk, like in ICI Ltd v Shatwell where an experienced quarry shotfirer said he "could not be bothered" to wait 10 minutes before setting of a detonation, and blew up his brother. Third, even if a worker was slightly at fault, until 1945 such contributory negligence precluded the whole of the claim. Now the court will only reduce damages by the amount the employee contributed to their own injury. The fourth defence available to employers, which still exists, is ex turpi causa non oritur actio, that if the employee was engaged in any illegal activity they may not claim compensation for injuries. In Hewison v Meridian Shipping Services Pte Ltd Mr Hewison concealed his epilepsy so that he could work offshore was technically guilty of illegally attempting to gain a pecuniary advantage by deception under the Theft Act 1968 section 16. After being struck in the head by a defective gangplank he suffered worse fits than before, but the Court of Appeal, by a majority, held his illegal act precluded any compensation.

The common law of tort also remains particularly relevant for the type of liability an employer has where there is scientific uncertainty about the cause of an injury. In asbestos disease cases, a worker may have been employed with at a number of jobs where he was exposed to asbestos, but his injury cannot with certainty be traced to any one. Although he may be able to sue all of them, a number may have already gone insolvent. In Fairchild v Glenhaven Funeral Services Ltd the House of Lords held that if any employer had materially increased the risk of harm to the worker, they could would be jointly and severally liable and could be sued for the full sum, leaving it up to them to seek contribution from others and thus the risk of other businesses' insolvency. For a brief period, in Barker v Corus the House of Lords then decided that employers would only be liable on a proportionate basis, thus throwing the risk of employers' insolvency back onto workers. Immediately Parliament passed the Compensation Act 2006 section 3 to reverse the decision on its facts. It has also been held in Chandler v Cape plc, in 2011, that even though a subsidiary company is the direct employer of a worker, a parent company will owe a duty of care. Thus shareholders may not be able to hide behind the corporate veil to escape their obligations for the health and safety of the workforce.

=== Road safety ===
Many serious accidents in practice take place on the roads. Like workplaces, this encouraged Parliament to require compulsory insurance for harm. The Road Traffic Act 1988 requires that motorists either be insured against any liability for injuries to other drivers, pedestrians or passengers and damage to property, or have made a specified deposit (£500,000 in 1991) and keeps the sum deposited with the Accountant General of the Supreme Court. Using an uninsured motor vehicle on public roads is an offence. Private land to which the public have a reasonable right of access (for example, a supermarket car park during opening hours) is considered to be included within the requirements of the Act. Police may seize vehicles that do not appear to have necessary insurance in place. Drivers caught driving without insurance for a vehicle they own are liable to be prosecuted by the police and, upon conviction, will receive either a fixed penalty or magistrate's courts penalty.

- Vehicle Excise Duty
- Comprehensive Cover
- Motor Insurers' Bureau
- Highway Code
- Driving Standards Agency

=== Environmental damage ===
- Climate damage and the Climate Change Act 2008
- Environmental Protection Act 1990
- Integrated Pollution Prevention and Control Directive 2008/1/EC
- Industrial Emissions Directive 2010 2010/75/EU

=== Occupiers' liability ===
Occupiers' Liability is currently governed by the two Occupier's Liability Acts, 1957 and 1984. Under these rules, an occupier, such as a shopkeeper, a home owner or a public authority, who invites others onto their land, or has trespassers, owes a minimum duty of care for people's safety. One early case was Cooke v Midland Great Western Railway of Ireland [1909] AC 229, in which Lord Macnaughton felt that children who were hurt whilst looking for berries on a building site, should have some compensation for their unfortunate curiosity.

- Roles v Nathan
- Tomlinson v Congleton Borough Council

=== Nuisance ===
The tort of nuisance allows a claimant (formerly plaintiff) to sue for most acts that interfere with their use and enjoyment of their land. A good example of this is in the case of Jones v Powell (1629). A brewery made stinking vapours waft to neighbours' property, damaging his papers. Because he was a landowner, the neighbour sued in nuisance for this damage. But Whitelocke J, speaking for the Court of the King's Bench, said that because the water supply was contaminated, it was better that the neighbour's documents were risked. He said "it is better that they should be spoiled than that the common wealth stand in need of good liquor." Nowadays, interfering with neighbours' property is not looked upon so kindly. Nuisance deals with all kinds of things that spoil a landowner's enjoyment of his property.

- Sturges v Bridgman
- Miller v Jackson

A subset of nuisance is known as the rule in Rylands v Fletcher, which originates in a case where a dam burst into a coal mine shaft. In such cases, a dangerous escape of some hazard, including water, fire, or animals, gives rise to a strict liability claim. This is subject only to a remoteness cap, familiar from negligence when the event is unusual and unpredictable. This was the case where chemicals from a factory seeped through a floor into the water table, contaminating East Anglia's reservoirs.

=== Trespass ===
A trespass is a direct injury to a person, his property or land, committed directly and intentionally by the defendant, for example, walking on someone's land is not trespass but cutting a gate into pieces with a saw is. However, this rule did not cater for anything injured indirectly by a person, for example if a farmer sets fire to a field, and someone's home is subsequently damaged. Trespass by the case did, however, provide a legal writ for injury caused indirectly by an action.

- Case of Thorns

=== Defamation ===
Defamation means tarnishing the reputation of someone. It is divided into two parts, slander and libel. Slander is spoken defamation and libel is defaming somebody through print (or broadcasting). Both share the same features. To defame someone, you must (a) make a factual assertion (b) for which you cannot provide evidence of its truth. Defamation does not affect the voicing of opinions, but comes into the same fields as rights to free speech in the European Convention's Article 10.

=== Breach of confidence ===
UK courts have created a common law responsibility to not share non-public information about others under certain circumstances, regardless of the existence of a contractual agreement.

=== Intentional torts ===
Intentional torts are any intentional acts that are reasonably foreseeable to cause harm to an individual, and that do so. Intentional torts have several subcategories, including tort(s) against the person, including assault, battery, false imprisonment, intentional infliction of emotional distress, and fraud. Property torts involve any intentional interference with the property rights of the claimant. Those commonly recognised include trespass to land, trespass to chattels, and conversion.

- Derry v Peek

=== Economic torts and competition ===
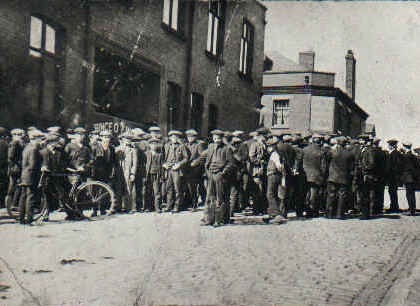
Strikers gathering in Tyldesley in the 1926 General Strike in the UK

Economic torts protect people from interference with their trade or business. The area includes the doctrine of restraint of trade and has largely been submerged in the twentieth century by statutory interventions on collective labour law and modern antitrust or competition law. The "absence of any unifying principle drawing together the different heads of economic tort liability has often been remarked upon."

Two cases demonstrated economic tort's affinity to competition and labour law. In Mogul Steamship Co. Ltd. the plaintiff argued he had been driven from the Chinese tea market by competitors at a 'shipping conference' that had acted together to underprice his company. But this cartel was ruled lawful and "nothing more [than] a war of competition waged in the interest of their own trade." Nowadays, this would be considered a criminal cartel. In labour law the most notable case is Taff Vale Railway Co v Amalgamated Society of Railway Servants. The House of Lords thought that unions should be liable in tort for helping workers to go on strike for better pay and conditions, but it riled workers so much that it led to the creation of the British Labour Party and the Trade Disputes Act 1906. Further torts used against unions include conspiracy, interference with a commercial contract or intimidation.

Through a recent development in common law, beginning with Hedley Byrne v Heller in 1964, and further through the Misrepresentations Act 1967, a victim of the tort of misrepresentation will be compensated for purely economic loss due to the misconception of the terms of the contract.

The English doctrine of restraint of trade was the catalyst for much of what is now called "competition laws" (or sometimes "antitrust"). These laws are a way of restraining those who would restrain "free competition" in the market economy, through monopolising production, setting up cartels, imposing unfair trading conditions, prices and so on. The English approach has traditionally been very flexible and liberal in its scope, but draconian when it did deem certain behaviour to be in restraint of trade. Many of these laws around the end of the nineteenth century were focused on the emasculation of trade unionism, until the reforming government of 1906 and the Trade Disputes Act 1906. Aside from the common law, legislation was introduced shortly after the Second World War to foot policy on a statutory basis, the Monopolies and Restrictive Practices Act 1948, followed later by the Restrictive Trade Practices Act 1956 and the Monopolies and Mergers Act 1965.

Since 1972, however, the UK has fallen under the cross-border-competition law regime of the European Community, which is found primarily in Articles 81 and 82 of the Treaty of the European Community. Companies that form a cartel or collude to disrupt competition (Article 81) or to abuse a dominant position in the market – for instance through a monopoly (Article 82) – face fines from the public-enforcement authorities, and in some cases they also face a cause of action in tort. A huge issue in the EU is whether to follow the US approach of private damages actions to prevent anti-competitive conduct. In other words, the question is what should be seen as a private wrong (as was held in the vertical restraints case of Courage Ltd v Crehan) and what should be seen as a public wrong where only public enforcers are competent to impose penalties. In 1998 the United Kingdom brought its legislation up to date, with the Competition Act 1998, followed by the Enterprise Act 2002, a regime mirroring that of the European Union. The domestic enforcers are the Office of Fair Trading and the Competition Commission.

== Vicarious liability ==
"If a slave man or woman damages any piece of someone else's property, then provided the person who suffers the loss was not himself partly to blame because of inexperience or careless conduct, the slave's owner must either make good the damage in full, or hand over the actual offender."
Plato, The Laws, Book 11, §25, Damage by slaves.

Vicarious liability refers to the idea of an employer being liable for torts committed by their employees, generally for policy reasons, and to ensure that victims have a means of recovery. The word "vicarious" derives from the Latin for 'change' or 'alternation' and the old Latin for the doctrine is respondeat superior. To establish vicarious liability, the courts must find first that there exists a relationship of employee and employer. The torts of independent contractors generally do not impose vicarious liability on employers; however, Honeywill and Stein Ltd v Larkin Brothers Ltd demonstrates this principle does not apply where particularly hazardous activities are contracted for, or a non-delegable duty is owed. Secondly, the tort must have been committed 'in the course of employment'; or while an employee is going about the business of their employer. A preferred test of the courts for connecting torts to the course of employment was formulated by John William Salmond, which states that an employer will be held liable for either a wrongful act they have authorised, or a wrongful and unauthorised mode of an act that was authorised. Where in Limpus v London General Omnibus Company an omnibus driver chose to disobey strict instructions from his employer, to obstruct a rival company, they were still liable, as he was merely engaging in his duties in an unauthorised way. However, in the contrasting case of Beard v London General Omnibus Company, there was no liability where a conductor drove an omnibus negligently, as it was no part of his duties. Under the test, employers were generally not held liable for intentional torts of their employees. Lister v Hesley Hall Ltd established a newer test, stating that employers would be liable for torts which were closely connected to the duties of an employee.

- Catholic Child Welfare Society v Institute of the Brothers of the Christian Schools [2012] UKSC 56
- Mohamud v WM Morrison Supermarkets plc [2016] UKSC 11
- Cox v Ministry of Justice [2016] UKSC 10
- WM Morrisons Supermarkets plc v Various Claimants [2020] UKSC 12, not liable for a vengeful employee who posted the personal data of 100,000 employees online
- Barclays Bank plc v Various Claimants [2020] UKSC 13, no liability for self-employed doctor who was engaged to examine staff and sexually assaulted them

== Remedies ==
=== Damages ===
The main remedy against tortious loss is compensation in 'damages' or money. In a limited range of cases, tort law will tolerate self-help, such as reasonable force to expel a trespasser. This is a defence against the tort of battery. Further, in the case of a continuing tort, or even where harm is merely threatened, the courts will sometimes grant an injunction. This means a command, for something other than money by the court, such as restraining the continuance or threat of harm.

For people who have died as a result of another person's tort, the damages that their estate or their families may gain is governed by the Fatal Accidents Act 1976 (replacing the Fatal Accidents Act 1846). Under s.1A the spouse or dependent of a victim may receive £15,120 in bereavement damages.

=== Injunctions ===
As a remedy to tort, injunctions are most commonly used in cases of Nuisance. The court may impose an injunction on a tortfeasor, such as in Sturges v Bridgman. This legally obliges the tortfeasor to stop or reduce the activity causing the nuisance and its breach could, potentially, be a criminal offence. Injunctions may be used instead of or as well as the awarding of damages (above).

== Theory and reform ==
Scholars and lawyers have identified conflicting aims for the law of tort, to some extent reflected in the different types of damages awarded by the courts: compensatory, aggravated and punitive or exemplary. In The Aims of the Law of Tort (1951), Glanville Williams saw four possible bases on which different torts rested: appeasement, justice, deterrence and compensation.

From the late 1950s a group of legally oriented economists and economically oriented lawyers emphasised incentives and deterrence, and identified the aim of tort as being the efficient distribution of risk. They are often described as the law and economics movement. Ronald Coase, one of the movement's principal proponents, submitted, in his article The Problem of Social Cost (1960), that the aim of tort should be to reflect as closely as possible liability where transaction costs should be minimised.

Calls for reform of tort law come from diverse standpoints reflecting diverse theories of the objectives of the law. Some calls for reform stress the difficulties encountered by potential claimants. Because of all people who have accidents, only some can find solvent defendants from which to recover damages in the courts, P. S. Atiyah has called the situation a "damages lottery". Consequently, in New Zealand, the government in the 1960s established a "no-fault" system of state compensation for accidents. Similar proposals have been the subject of command papers in the UK and much academic debate.

There is some overlap between crime and tort, since tort, a private action, used to be used more than criminal laws in centuries gone. For example, an assault is both a crime and a tort (a form of trespass to the person). A tort allows a person, usually the victim, to obtain a remedy that serves their own purposes (for example by the payment of damages to a person injured in a car accident, or the obtaining of injunctive relief to stop a person interfering with their business). Criminal actions on the other hand are pursued not to obtain remedies to assist a person — although often criminal courts do have power to grant such remedies — but to remove their liberty on the state's behalf. That explains why incarceration is usually available as a penalty for serious crimes, but not usually for torts.

== See also ==
- English contract law
- Insurance law
- Law
- Jurisprudence
