= Bailey v Ministry of Defence =

English tort law case on factual causation

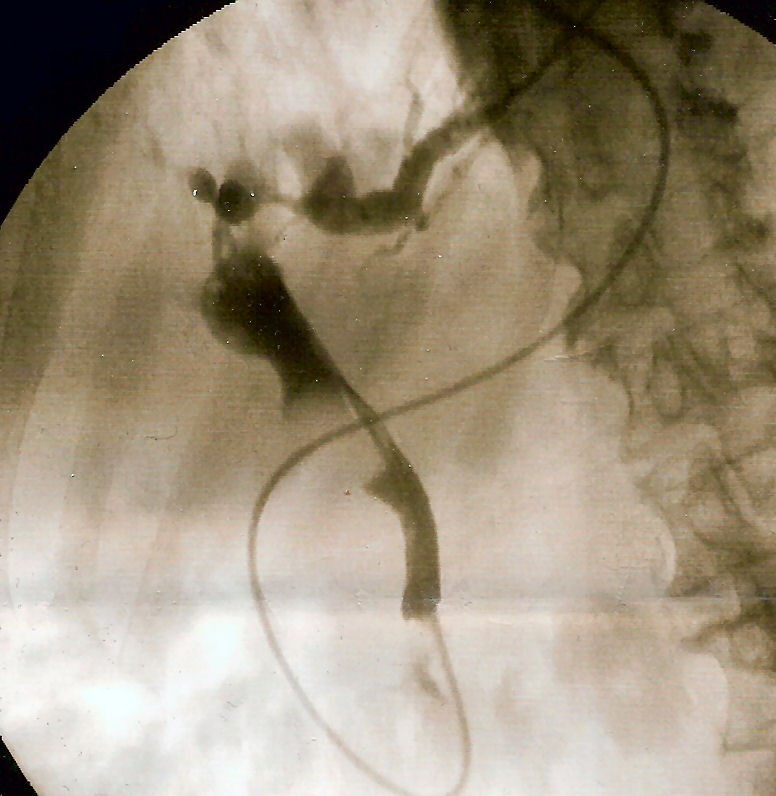
- Court: Court of Appeal
- Citations: [2008] EWCA Civ 883, [2009] 1 WLR 1052
- Transcript: Full judgment

Case history
- Prior action: [2007] EWHC 2913 (QB)

Court membership
- Judges sitting: Waller LJ, Sedley LJ and Smith LJ

Bailey v Ministry of Defence [2008] EWCA Civ 883 is an English tort law case. It concerns the problematic question of factual causation, and the interplay of the "but for" test and its relaxation through a "material contribution" test.

== Facts ==
Miss Grannia Geraldine Bailey went on a holiday to Kenya with her fiancé in late September 2000. She came back with what was suspected to be gallstones. In early January 2001 she was admitted to Royal Hospital Haslar (a hospital for civilian NHS patients, but also used and run by the Ministry of Defence). At the hospital there were complications during the ERCP procedure to remove the stones from her bile duct. She bled extensively, but was put in a ward with little supervision. She was not resuscitated properly during the night, and she was very unwell in the morning. She got worse. At the same time (but this was not related to the hospital's lack of care) Miss Bailey developed pancreatitis. Pancreatitis sometimes develops after ERCP procedures. She was then transferred to another hospital, the Queen Alexandra and St Mary's Hospital in Portsmouth and put into intensive care. She was in a critical condition for ten days. She began to recover and was moved to the renal ward. She felt nauseous when drinking lemonade and vomited as a result. As Miss Bailey was weak, she was unable to clear her air passages and thus choked. By the time she was resuscitated she had gone into cardiac arrest and had hypoxic brain damage.

The question in the Court of Appeal was whether the first Ministry of Defence hospital caused the brain damage. It could not be said with certainty that it was their poor care that led to Miss Bailey's weakness (and the choking leading to brain damage), because her weakness was also a result of the pancreatitis that Miss Bailey developed (and that was not the MoD hospital's fault). Counsel for Miss Bailey argued that the MoD hospital was nevertheless liable because although the brain damage would not, strictly, have been caused "but for" the substandard care, the substandard care had materially increased the risk of harm.

In the High Court Foskett J held that Miss Bailey should recover compensation. The Ministry of Defence appealed.

== Judgment ==
Waller LJ (delivering an opinion with which Sedley LJ and Smith LJ concurred) upheld the High Court, and ruled that the material increase in risk to Miss Bailey created by the Ministry of Defence's hospital made for a sufficient causal connection to be liable in negligence. In particular he asserted that there should be no distinction drawn between medical negligence (where there has been a material increase in risk) and employer liability cases. He held that where the "but for" test of causation cannot be satisfied because of some uncertainty, it is relaxed and a claimant will succeed in getting compensation if the defendant materially contributed to the cause of the injury.

8 Before the judge there was an issue as to the law. Authorities such as Bonnington Castings Ltd v Wardlaw [1956] AC 613 (Wardlaw), McGhee v National Coal Board [1973] 1 WLR (McGhee), Hotson v East Berkshire Area Health Authority [1987] 1 AC 750 (Hotson), Wilsher v Essex Area Health Authority [1988] 1 AC 1074 (Wilsher), Fairchild v Glenhaven Funeral Services Ltd [2005] 2 AC 32 (Fairchild) and Gregg v Scott [2005] 2 AC 176 (Gregg v Scott) were cited. Mr Gibson QC, for the claimant, submitted that the authorities showed that the correct question was whether the negligence had "caused or materially contributed to" the injury. Mr Sweeting submitted that the proper basis was not "contribution to risk or occurrence"; the right test was what he termed "the normal unmodified requirement that the alleged failure should have caused the harm, so that without it the damage would not have occurred." He placed particular reliance on Wilsher.

9 Wilsher was a case where a premature baby negligently received an excessive concentration of oxygen and suffered retrolental fibroplasia leading to blindness. However the medical evidence demonstrated that this can occur in premature babies who have not been given excessive oxygen, and there were four other distinct conditions which could also have been causative of the fibroplasia. In the Court of Appeal the claim had succeeded; the majority in their judgments placing some reliance on the House of Lords decision in McGhee. In McGhee the employer was found liable for causing dermatitis caused by brick dust. The brick dust had adhered to the body during employment, but in a situation where there was no breach of duty, but had continued to adhere to the body by virtue of a failure to provide showers, which was a breach of duty. The employers were found liable because they had materially contributed to the risk. Mustill LJ formulated the test he thought appropriate to apply to the circumstances in Wilsher in the following words:-

"If it is an established fact that conduct of a particular kind creates a risk that injury will be caused to another or increases an existing risk that injury will ensue; and if the two parties stand in such a relationship that the one party owes a duty not to conduct himself in that way; and if the other party does suffer injury of the kind to which the risk related; then the first party is taken to have caused the injury by his breach of duty, even though the existence and extent of the contribution made by the breach cannot be ascertained."

10 But in the House of Lords the claim in Wilsher failed because it was said McGhee was distinguishable. Reliance was placed on the dissenting judgment in the Court of Appeal of Browne-Wilkinson VC who distinguished McGhee in the following terms. This passage is quoted by Foskett J in his judgment:-

"To apply the principle in McGhee v National Coal Board [1973] 1 WLR 1 to the present case would constitute an extension of that principle. In the McGhee case there was no doubt that the pursuer's dermatitis was physically caused by brick dust: the only question was whether the continued presence of such brick dust on the pursuer's skin after the time when he should have been provided with a shower caused or materially contributed to the dermatitis which he contracted. There was only one possible agent which could have caused the dermatitis, viz., brick dust, and there was no doubt that the dermatitis from which he suffered was caused by that brick dust.

In the present case the question is different. There are a number of different agents which could have caused the RLF. Excess oxygen was one of them. The defendants failed to take reasonable precautions to prevent one of the possible causative agents (e.g. excess oxygen) from causing RLF. But no one can tell in this case whether excess oxygen did or did not cause or contribute to the RLF suffered by the plaintiff. The plaintiffs RLF may have been caused by some completely different agent or agents, e.g. hypercarbia, intraventricular haemorrhage, apnoeas or patent ductus arteriosus. In addition to oxygen, each of those conditions has been implicated as a possible cause of RLF. This baby suffered from each of those conditions at various times in the first two months of his life. There is no satisfactory evidence that excess oxygen is more likely than any of those other four candidates to have caused RLF in this baby. To my mind, the occurrence of RLF following a failure to take a necessary precaution to prevent excess oxygen causing RLF provides no evidence and raises no presumption that it was excess oxygen rather than one or more of the four other possible agents which caused or contributed to RLF in this case.

The position, to my mind, is wholly different from that in the McGhee case where there was only one candidate (brick dust) which could have caused the dermatitis, and the failure to take a precaution against brick dust causing dermatitis was followed by dermatitis caused by brick dust. In such a case, I can see the common sense, if not the logic, of holding that, in the absence of any other evidence, the failure to take the precaution caused or contributed to the dermatitis. To the extent that certain members of the House of Lords decided the question on inferences from evidence or presumptions, I do not consider that the present case falls within their reasoning. A failure to take preventative measures against one out of five possible causes is no evidence as to which of those five caused the injury."

11 Mr Sweeting before the judge, as he would also before us, submitted that Wilsher was the authority governing the circumstances of this case and he submitted that, as in that case, adding an existing risk to risks which might also have caused harm was not proof of causation, even if the new risk arose from negligence. His submission was that in this case it could not be shown that the want of care was the effective cause of the claimant's inability to prevent aspiration, whatever conclusion the court reached about the possibility of earlier intervention and the saving of the claimant from what occurred from 15th January onwards. His case was that it was the pancreatitis that was the effective cause, both of the vomiting and the inability to prevent aspiration, or at the least that the evidence would not establish that but for the want of care the claimant would not have aspirated. He submitted that, unless the claimant could establish that but for the lack of care the claimant would not have suffered brain damage, she must fail.

12 The judge did not accept Mr Sweeting's submission. The judge quoted Lord Bridge in Hotson v East Berkshire Area Health Authority [1987] AC 750 at page 783 where he said this:-

"As I have said, there was in this case an inescapable issue of causation first to be resolved. But if the plaintiff had proved on a balance of probabilities that the authority's negligent failure to diagnose and treat his injury promptly had materially contributed to the development of avascular necrosis, I know of no principle of English law which would have entitled the authority to a discount from the full measure of damage to reflect the chance that, even given prompt treatment, avascular necrosis might well still have developed. The decisions of this House in Bonnington Casting Ltd v Wardlaw [1956] AC 613 and McGhee v National Coal Board [1973] 1 WLR 1 give no support to such a view."

13 The judge then said this:-

"My attention has not been drawn to any subsequent authority that has cast doubt on the formulation of the burden on the Claimant as set out in that passage. If this approach to causation is permitted it does, of course, mean that the 'but for' test is not being applied: see Fairchild v Glenhaven, etc, at paragraph 129 per Lord Rodger of Earlsferry."

14 At paragraph 129 Lord Rodger in Fairchild said this:-

"The idea of liability based on wrongful conduct that had materially contributed to an injury was . . . well established long before Wardlaw. But Wardlaw became a convenient point of reference, especially in cases of industrial disease. In such cases this basis of liability is of considerable importance. Since it is enough that the defendant's wrongful act materially contributed to the claimant's injury, the law is not applying the causa sine qua non or 'but for' test of causation. In Wardlaw, for instance, the pursuer did not need to prove that, but for the dust from the swing hammers, he would not have developed pneumoconiosis. All he needed to prove was that the dust from the swing hammers contributed materially to the dusty atmosphere which he breathed and which caused his illness. As will be seen below, in the Court of Session in McGhee the judges lost sight of this important point."

15 The judge, having cited Wilsher and the passage already quoted in the judgment of Sir Nicholas Browne-Wilkinson VC, concluded that the correct question was whether the negligence had "caused or materially contributed to" the injury.

16 As to what is a "material contribution" the judge did not quote any authority but in Mr Gibson's submission Lord Reid's formulation in Wardlaw provides the answer:-

"The medical evidence was that pneumoconiosis is caused by a gradual accumulation in the lungs of minute particles of silica inhaled over a period of years. That means, I think, that the disease is caused by the whole of the noxious material inhaled and, if that material comes from two sources, it cannot be wholly attributed to material from one source or the other. I am in agreement with much of the Lord President's opinion in this case, but I cannot agree that the question is: which was the most probable source of the respondent's disease, the dust from the pneumatic hammers or the dust from the wing grinders? It appears to me that the source of his disease was the dust from both sources, and the real question is whether the dust from the swing grinders materially contributed to the disease. A contribution which comes within the exception de minimis non curat lex is not material, but I think that any contribution which does not fall within that exception must be material. I do not see how there can be something too large to come within the de minimis principle but yet too small to be material."

17 So the judge was concerned to ascertain whether the negligence in the care of the claimant (admitted to some degree) made a material contribution to the injury suffered by the claimant – material meaning something more than negligible. He held that it did and his reasoning in essence was (1) if appropriate care and resuscitation had been provided after the procedure on 12th January the claimant would have been to fit to have, and have had, a further procedure on the 12th January which would have saved all, or at least some, of the traumatic and life-threatening period and procedures which she had to endure on 15th to 19th January; (2) that would have avoided the considerable weakening of the claimant, which resulted and which was occurring in addition to any debilitation arising from her pancreatitis; (3) the physical cause of her aspiration and subsequent cardiac arrest was her weakness and inability to react to her vomit; (4) there were two contributory causes of that weakness, the non-negligent cause pancreatitis, and the negligent cause, the lack of care and what flowed from that; and (5) since each "contributed materially" to the overall weakness, and since the overall weakness caused the aspiration, causation was established.

...

36 If the claimant could have established on the balance of probabilities that 'but for' the negligence of the defendant the injury would not have occurred, she would have been entitled to succeed. That however was not the conclusion of the judge in this case; all he felt able to find was that the negligence made a material contribution to the injury suffered, i.e. a contribution that was more than negligible. That is not an application of the 'but for' test as Lord Rodger made clear in Fairchild (see paragraph 14 above). Was this a case in which the judge was entitled to depart from the 'but for' test?

37 There are cases where the strict 'but for' test has not been applied. Fairchild was a case where the claimant had contracted mesothelioma; he had been employed by various employers who had all in breach of duty exposed him to asbestos fibres; the evidence established that one fibre actually caused mesothelioma as opposed to all contributing so to do; it followed that as a fact only one defendant would have caused the injury but the claimant could not because of the inadequacies of medical science establish which. The House of Lords introduced an exception to traditional principles so as to render liable all who "contributed to the risk" even if as was bound to be the case only one defendant would actually have caused the injury. They interpreted McGhee as supporting that exception.

38 McGhee was a case of a sole defendant exposing an employee to "innocent" brick dust i.e. to brick dust when there was no breach of duty and also to "guilty dust" adhering to the employee's skin as a result of a breach of duty in failing to provide showers. Lord Reid referred to the evidence and as to how dermatitis begins and as to why McGhee differs from Wardlaw in this way.

"In the present case the evidence does not show – perhaps no one knows – just how dermatitis of this type begins. It suggests to me that there are two possible ways. It may be that an accumulation of minor abrasions of the horny layer of the skin is a necessary precondition for the onset of the disease. Or it may be that the disease starts at one particular abrasion and then spreads, so that multiplication of abrasions merely increases the number of places where the disease can start and in that way increases the risk of its occurrence.

I am inclined to think that the evidence points to the former view. But in a field where so little appears to be known with certainty I could not say that that is proved. If it were, then this case would be indistinguishable from Wardlaw's case. But I think that in cases like this we must take a broader view of causation. The medical evidence is to the effect that the fact that the man had to cycle home caked with grime and sweat added materially to the risk that this disease might develop. It does not and could not explain just why that is so. But experience shows that it is so. Plainly that must be because what happens while the man remains unwashed can have a causative effect, though just how the cause operates is uncertain. I cannot accept the view expressed in the Inner House that once the man left the brick kiln he left behind the causes which made him liable to develop dermatitis. That seems to me quite inconsistent with a proper interpretation of the medical evidence. Nor can I accept the distinction drawn by the Lord Ordinary between materially increasing the risk that the diseases will occur and making a material contribution to its occurrence.

There may be some logical ground for such a distinction where our knowledge of all the material factors is complete. But it has often been said that the legal concept of causation is not based on logic or philosophy. It is based on the practical way in which the ordinary man's mind works in the everyday affairs of life. From a broad and practical viewpoint I can see no substantial difference between saying that what the defender did materially increased the risk of injury to the pursuer and saying that what the defender did made a material contribution to his injury.

I would therefore allow this appeal."

39 Wardlaw was a case where the accumulation of innocent dust and guilty dust had caused the injury and where although the exposure to the "innocent dust" was greater than to the "guilty" dust the employer was liable because the "breach of duty caused or materially contributed to the injury" [see Lord Reid at page 620]. It is important to be clear precisely what Wardlaw decided. Did it decide that in a cumulative cause case where the inadequacies of medical science meant the relative potency could not be established all a claimant had to establish was a "material" contribution which in the words of Lord Reid meant something more than de minimis? Or did a claimant still have to establish that 'but for' the contribution of the negligent cause, the injury would not have occurred?

40 If one goes to the speech of Lord Keith in Wardlaw it seems to me that his language could be said to support a 'but for' approach appreciating that in the context of the facts he was dealing with it was because the defendant could not establish that his breach of duty did not cause the injury that the 'but for' test was complied with. He said this at page 626:-

"Small though the contribution of pollution may be for which the defenders are to blame, it was continuous over a long period. In cumulo it must have been substantial, though it might remain small in proportion. It was the atmosphere inhaled by the pursuer that caused his illness and it is impossible, in my opinion, to resolve the components of that atmosphere into particles caused by the fault of the defenders and particles not caused by the fault of the defenders, as if they were separate and independent factors in his illness. Prima facie the particles inhaled are acting cumulatively, and I think the natural inference is that had it not been for the cumulative effect the pursuer would not have developed pneumoconiosis when he did and might not have developed it at all."

41 The use of the word "substantial" also seems to connote a higher causative potency than Lord Reid's in excess of de minimis. The word 'substantial' has also appeared in the language of others since Wardlaw. Examples are Lord Hoffmann in Gregg v Scott paragraph 77 in dealing with Wilsher, where he said that "The defendant was only liable if the lack of oxygen caused or substantially (my italics) contributed to the injury." This is also the language used by Lord Simon in McGhee at page 8 D.

42 Even Lord Reid in Wardlaw at one stage uses the word "substantially" in looking at both the impact of the "guilty" dust and the "innocent" dust [see page 622] but his ultimate conclusion demonstrates that he is applying the "anything greater than de minimis test" when he concludes "In my opinion it is proved not only that the swing grinders may well have contributed but that they did in fact contribute a quota of silica dust which was not negligible to the pursuers' lungs and therefore did help to produce the disease" [page 623]. His speech is expressly adopted by Viscount Simmons [page 618]; Lord Tucker adopts the same test [page 623] and Lord Somervell agrees with all [page 627].

43 It seems to me thus respectfully that Lord Rodger in Fairchild accurately summarises the position when he says in paragraph 129 that in the cumulative cause case such as Wardlaw the 'but for' test is modified.

44 Are there any cases in the medical negligence context which cast any doubt on applying Wardlaw in that context? Certainly in Wilsher the House of Lords applied strictly the 'but for' test and rejected the Court of Appeal's interpretation of McGhee but it was not a case of causes cumulatively causing injury but a case where there were different distinct causes which operated in a different way and might have caused the injury and where the claimant could not establish which cause either "caused or contributed" to his injury. It was the inadequacies of medical science that put the claimant in the position of not being able to establish the probability of one cause as against the other but the House of Lords were not prepared to place the case in an exceptional category.

45 Hotson was a case where the House of Lords held that the cause of the injury was the non-negligent falling out of the tree and that that injury would, on the balance of probabilities, have occurred anyway without the negligent delay in treatment; thus the negligent conduct made no contribution to causing that injury. Gregg v Scott was again a medical negligence case but was not concerned with whether the negligence made a material contribution to the damage.

46 In my view one cannot draw a distinction between medical negligence cases and others. I would summarise the position in relation to cumulative cause cases as follows. If the evidence demonstrates on a balance of probabilities that the injury would have occurred as a result of the non-tortious cause or causes in any event, the claimant will have failed to establish that the tortious cause contributed. Hotson exemplifies such a situation. If the evidence demonstrates that 'but for' the contribution of the tortious cause the injury would probably not have occurred, the claimant will (obviously) have discharged the burden. In a case where medical science cannot establish the probability that 'but for' an act of negligence the injury would not have happened but can establish that the contribution of the negligent cause was more than negligible, the 'but for' test is modified, and the claimant will succeed.

47 The instant case involved cumulative causes acting so as to create a weakness and thus the judge in my view applied the right test, and was entitled to reach the conclusion he did.

Conclusion

48 I would dismiss the appeal.

== Appraisal ==
The case received some quick comment. Sarah Green was supportive of the outcome for correcting some old mistakes. She wrote,

The exceptional approach to the causal inquiry which derives from McGhee and Fairchild does not apply to the Wardlaw/Bailey situation because there was in the former cases a need to modify the “but for” test because no “but for” causation could otherwise be established. The principal difference between the two types of situation lies in the nature of the claimants' injuries; in cases like Fairchild, where the injury is indivisible, it is simply impossible to establish “but for” causation because the cause of the injury (which might or might not be singular) cannot be identified even in part, in the way that it can with a divisible (cumulative) injury like the one in Bailey. Despite, therefore, Lord Reid's assertion in McGhee that he could not accept “the distinction drawn … between materially increasing the risk that the disease will occur and making a material contribution to its occurrence”, the distinction is, with respect to his Lordship, a very important one. Where a defendant is held liable for materially increasing the risk of an injury occurring, “but for” causation has not been established because it cannot be, and so some potential causes will attract liability even though they may well have had nothing to do with causing the injury in question...

The result in Bailey is, therefore, clearly correct, since it coheres in substance both with the relevant authorities and with common sense. It is to be hoped, however, that the reasoning therein, and particularly the misleading assertion that it constitutes a modified application of the “but for” test, will not be misinterpreted in future decisions in this notoriously thorny area. In cumulative cause situations, the “but for” test itself stands because, by definition, for the cumulative cause problem to arise, there must be several causes, all of which, on the balance of probabilities, contribute to the end state of the claimant. Otherwise, it is a multiple potential cause situation, like Wilsher, in which a causal link cannot be forensically identified. In Bailey -type situations, on the other hand, it is the apportionment exercise, which would be carried out were the cumulative causes to have operated independently, that has to be modified.

By contrast, Marc Staunch has been critical of "hairline distinctions" that the case law has given rise to, but focused some of his criticism on Waller LJ's universal approach, saying,

despite Waller LJ's assertion to the contrary, there are, with respect, significant differences between industrial disease and medical negligence claims, justifying a more claimant-friendly approach in the former. There, typically, the claimant is exposed to risk factors that, even if the defendant is only at fault for one, all ultimately derive from the workplace environment. By contrast, in medical cases, the doctor intervenes on behalf of the patient to ward off natural risks (stemming from illness), and the treatment itself usually adds to the risks in play; furthermore (as Lord Hoffmann noted in Fairchild ), in the case of NHS care, allowing recovery in doubtful causation cases will affect the resources available for other patients. Even though the claim in Bailey was not ultimately against the NHS, and notwithstanding that the case was a very sad one, it is submitted that the Court of Appeal's approach to resolving it is not sustainable.

== See also ==
- English tort law
- Bonnington Castings Ltd v Wardlaw [1956] AC 613, [1956] 2 WLR 707, [1956] 1 All ER 615
- McGhee v National Coal Board [1972] 3 All ER 1008
- Wilsher v Essex Area Health Authority [1988] AC 1074
- Fairchild v Glenhaven Funeral Services Ltd [2002] UKHL 22
- Barker v Corus (UK) plc [2006] UKHL 20
