= Breaking the chain =

Principle in English law

Breaking the chain (or novus actus interveniens, literally new intervening act) refers in English law to the idea that causal connections are deemed to finish. Even if the defendant can be shown to have acted negligently, there will be no liability if some new intervening act breaks the chain of causation between that negligence and the loss or damage sustained by the claimant.

== Discussion ==
Where there is only a single operative cause for the loss and damage suffered by the claimant, it is a relatively simple matter to determine whether that cause was a breach of the duty of care owed to the claimant by the defendant. But where the sequence of events leading to the loss and damage comprises more than one cause, the process of separating and attributing potential or actual liability is more complicated.

=== Act of God and other natural events as contributing causes ===
Where there are several potential causes of harm, some of which are tortious and some of which are natural, the basic rule is that the claimant can succeed only if he or she proves on the balance of probabilities that the loss and damage is attributable to the tort. In The Oropesa, a collision occurred in heavy seas between the Oropesa and the Manchester Regiment which was so seriously damaged that the captain sent fifty of the crew to the Oropesa. An hour later, he set off with sixteen of the crew to go to the Oropesa in another lifeboat. This lifeboat capsized in the heavy seas and nine of the crew drowned. The Manchester Regiment later sank. Relatives of the drowned seamen sued. The question was whether the action of the captain in leaving the Manchester Regiment broke the chain. It was held that the captain's action was the natural consequence of the emergency in which he was placed by the negligence of the Oropesa and, therefore, the deaths of the seamen were a direct consequence of the negligent act of the Oropesa. The question was not whether there was new negligence, but whether there was a new cause of action. To break the chain of causation there must be something "...unwarrantable, a new cause which disturbs the sequence of events, something which can be described as either unreasonable or extraneous or extrinsic."

But, when negligence is followed by a natural event of such magnitude that it erases the physical effects of the original negligence, the defendant's liability ceases at the moment in time when the supervening condition occurs. In Carslogie Steamship Co v Royal Norwegian Government, the Carslogie collided with the Heimgar and admitted liability. Temporary repairs were effected with permanent repairs to be carried out later in the United States. After the collision but before crossing the Atlantic, the Heimgar was given a certificate of seaworthiness, authorising her to be continued in her present class without fresh record of survey, subject to permanent repairs at the owner's convenience. She was held fit to carry dry and perishable cargoes. While crossing the Atlantic, the Heimgar encountered heavy weather and sustained such serious damage as to become unseaworthy and to require immediate dry docking. Thus, prior to encountering the rough weather, the Heimgar was a seaworthy vessel, capable of earning profits for her owners. Repairs due to the collision and to the heavy weather, as well as the owner's repairs were all carried out at the same time. Ten of the fifty days in dry dock were allocated to the repair of the collision damage and the question for the House of Lords was whether the owners of the Carslogie were liable for that ten-day loss of earning capacity. The claim was for damages because a working ship is "a profit-earning machine". If she ceases to earn a profit, it is essential to consider what caused the detention in dry dock at that time. In this case, the Heimgar was a profit-earning vessel before suffering the heavy weather damage. Thus, the loss of earnings at that time was not caused by the collision. Hence, The Oropesa demonstrates that where there are two successive causes of harm, the court may regard the first event as the cause of all the harm, or hold that the second supervening event reduces or eliminates the effect of the initial negligence as in Carslogie Steamship Co v Royal Norwegian Government.

=== Sequential causes ===
Decisions are not always clear-cut where the loss or damage flowing from an initial tort is overwhelmed by a more serious injury caused by:

(a) a second tort, or
(b) a supervening illness or natural event.

In Baker v Willoughby the defendant negligently injured the claimant's leg in a car accident. The claimant was later an innocent victim when shot in the same leg by some robbers and the leg was amputated. The House of Lords held that the defendant was liable to pay full compensation for the injury he had caused, based on the claimant's losses beyond the time when his leg was amputated. Since the claimant's disability would have been permanent, damages were assessed as if the second event had not occurred. If the chain had been treated as broken and the defendant had had no liability in respect of the period after the claimant's leg had been amputated, the claimant would have fallen between two sets of defendants (the robbers were not available as defendants to pay their share of full compensation). This decision was criticised in Jobling v Associated Dairies where the claimant's employer negligently caused a slipped disk which reduced his earning capacity by half. Four years later, the claimant was found to have a pre-existing spinal disease unrelated to the accident which gradually rendered him unable to work. The employer liability was limited to four years' loss of earnings because, whatever had happened, this illness would have caused the disability and was a “vicissitude of life”. The Lords considered that Baker should be regarded as an exception to the general "but-for" test, which was justified on its facts but not representing a general precedent.

=== Measurement and apportionment of damages ===
In Heil v Rankin a specially constituted Court of Appeal resolved eight test cases by creating a formula for increasing the measure of damages for pain, suffering and loss of amenity. In this respect, the case only affects a small number of personal injury claims which involve serious injury; and secondly, even in the most extreme of these cases, it increases damages by only modest amounts of up to one third. Lewis and others have long argued that a no-fault approach to compensation would be more appropriate. The Heil case simply reinforces the tort system for the award of damages (in January 1996 the Law Commission had published a Consultation Paper (No. 140) Damages for Personal Injury: Non-Pecuniary Loss, followed by Commission Report No. 257).

Heil was a police officer who was involved in a traumatic shooting incident in 1987. He was involved in a second incident in 1993. The cumulative effect of both incidents left him suffering from post traumatic stress disorder which ultimately became a permanent disability. Each incident produced its own stress with the first being the more serious cause which exacerbated the reaction to the second event. The defendant in the second incident argued that he did not cause Heil to suffer from PTSD because he already had that condition. All that the second incident did was to cause a temporary exacerbation of a pre-existing condition. Only a "moderate" award of damages was therefore considered appropriate. This apportions liability for underlying cause and exacerbating cause in a way that was not possible in the Baker case. The rule may be stated as:

"if no additional damage is caused by the second tort, only the first defendant will be liable to compensate for all the loss and damage flowing from the first tort"; but
"if additional damage is caused by the second tort, the liability to pay for the cumulative loss and damage is shared between the parties on a pro rata basis. The first defendant remains liable to pay for the loss and damage directly flowing from the breach of the duty, ignoring the second tort. The second defendant pays only for the additional loss and damage flowing from the second tort. The claimant therefore receives full compensation but divided between the defendants in the proportions that the court assesses."

=== Multiple possible causes ===
If there are several possible explanations for the cause of the loss or damage, the burden of proof is on the claimant to prove whichever causes are alleged as the cause of action. The claimant is not obliged to sue the defendant whose breach of duty is alleged to be the main cause of the damage. The only requirement is that, whoever is sued must have made a material contribution to the loss or damage suffered (see Bonnington Castings Ltd v Wardlaw). But in McGhee v National Coal Board, the claimant worked in brick kilns and contracted dermatitis. He alleged that the failure to provide showers had caused or contributed to the disease. The problem was to prove that he would not have contracted the disease "but for" the absence of showers. The Lords held that a breach of duty that materially increases the risk of injury proves negligence. This was a fairly radical departure from the usual test of causation. Indeed, Lord Wilberforce was also radical in a minority judgment by reversing the normal burden of proof once a prima facie case of increased risk was made out, i.e. it was then for the employer to show that the failure to provide showers did not cause the disease. In due course, the Lords retreated from this decision.

In Wilsher v Essex Area Health Authority there were some six possible causes for the blindness resulting in the claimant infant. Lord Bridge expressly disapproved the reversal of the burden of proof and claimed that McGhee did not represent new law. Thus, albeit by strained logic, the law was asserted to be that the claimant has the burden of proof to show that the alleged breach of duty materially increased the risk of injury. Now, Fairchild v Glenhaven Funeral Services Ltd seems to reinstate the majority McGhee test by allowing a claimant to succeed against more than one employer by proving that any one might have increased the risk of disease without actually proving exactly when or where the exposure took place. The case involved mesothelioma, a form of cancer contracted by the inhalation of asbestos dust. This is a public policy decision to overrule Wilsher and to allow asbestos claims. Albeit that it was expressly stated as a limited exception to the general rule of causation, it could have real impact in all cases of industrial disease.

=== Medical negligence and Fairchild causation ===
The case of Chester v Afshar suggested that the Fairchild ratio could be extended to beyond industrial disease cases. Chester is a case of ‘simple facts and complex causation’. Miss Chester suffered from back pain for which she sought the advice of the eminent neurosurgeon Mr. Afshar. A procedure was required to ameliorate the condition, but one that carried a 1-2% risk of paralysis by 'cauda equina syndrome'. Mr. Afshar failed to inform Miss Chester as to this risk involved. The surgery was performed without negligence. However the risk was eventuated and Miss Chester was left paralysed. Miss Chester won, not because Mr. Afshar had caused the harm to her but through not informing her (direct causation - which could not be proved as Mr. Afshar's advice had not increased the risk), but on a policy decision (like Fairchild) that she deserved compensation.

However, the case of Gregg v Scott (2005) (and an attempt to claim the same loose application of causation in a housing case Peter Paul Davidson (company) v White (2005)) has proved the difficulty of extending this ratio. So it remains to be seen if cases that 'break the chain' can be successful.

== See also ==
- Damages
- R v Holland
- Scott v Shepherd (1773) 96 ER 525
