= R v Kennedy =

Manslaughter case about suppliers of drugs

R. v Kennedy
- Court: House of Lords
- Full case name: R v Kennedy (On appeal from the Court of Appeal (Criminal Division))
- Decided: 17 October 2007
- Citation: [2007] UKHL 38

Court membership
- Judges sitting: Lord Bingham, Lord Rodger, Lady Hale, Lord Carswell, Lord Mance

Case opinions
- Where a person supplies a controlled drug to a fully-informed and responsible adult, who then freely and voluntarily administers the drug and dies as a result, the supplier cannot be liable for manslaughter.

Keywords
- Manslaughter in English law, Offences Against the Person Act 1861, Misuse of Drugs Act 1971, Causation in English law, Criminal Cases Review Commission

R v Kennedy [2007] UKHL 38 is a House of Lords case on manslaughter in English law. It established that where a person supplies a controlled drug to a fully informed and responsible adult, who dies as a result of freely and voluntarily administering that drug, the supplier cannot be guilty of manslaughter.

== Facts ==
Simon Kennedy lived in a hostel along with Marco Bosque and Andrew Cody. The latter two men shared a room. On 10 September 1996, Kennedy visited the room shared by Bosque and Cody, where they were drinking. Kennedy was a supplier of heroin to Bosque. Bosque asked Kennedy for "a bit [of heroin] to help [him] sleep". Kennedy prepared a dose of heroin and gave Bosque a syringe. Bosque injected himself and returned the syringe to Kennedy, who left. Bosque stopped breathing and an ambulance was called. He was taken to hospital and pronounced dead on arrival due to asphyxia caused by pulmonary aspiration of his stomach contents while acutely intoxicated by opiates and alcohol.

Kennedy was arrested and tried at the Old Bailey on 26 November 1997. He was convicted of manslaughter and supplying a Class A drug to another, and sentenced to five years' imprisonment. He appealed to the Court of Appeal of England and Wales but his appeal was dismissed on 31 July 1998.

== Proceedings ==
However, on 24 February 2004 the Criminal Cases Review Commission exercised its power under the Criminal Appeal Act 1995 to refer Kennedy's conviction for manslaughter back to the Court of Appeal, where it was again dismissed. Kennedy appealed to the House of Lords.

The Lords, sitting as an Appellate Committee, overturned the decision of the Court of Appeal and quashed Kennedy's conviction for manslaughter. They noted that a conviction of 'unlawful act' manslaughter (one of the two bases for manslaughter in English law, along with gross negligence) required the defendant to commit an unlawful act which was a crime and which was a significant cause of the deceased's death. The arguments in the case circled around the third point.

It was agreed that Kennedy had committed the crime of supplying a controlled drug to Bosque under the Misuse of Drugs Act 1971. The Lords stated, approving the Court of Appeal's ruling in R v Dalby [1982] 1 WLR 425, that the act of supplying drugs alone cannot be the foundation of a charge of unlawful act manslaughter as "the supply itself may have caused no harm unless the deceased had subsequently used the drugs in a form and quantity which was dangerous".

As such, the Crown Prosecution Service argued that Kennedy had committed the offence of "maliciously administering poison, etc., so as to endanger life or inflict grievous bodily harm" contrary to section 23 of the Offences Against the Person Act 1861 as the 'unlawful act' which was a significant cause of Bosque's death. It was argued that Kennedy had "administered" the heroin to Bosque, reading a wide interpretation of the word 'administer', by encouraging him to do so, such that he was jointly liable for Bosque having injected himself.

The Lords rejected this argument, recognising that an informed choice made with free will has historically been considered a novus actus interveniens in English law and specifically in the context of preparing a heroin injection in R v Dias [2002] Cr App R 96; while Kennedy may have "made more likely" that Bosque would inject himself, he did not cause him to do it as Bosque's choice had broken the chain of causation. This meant that he had not committed the crime under section 23, and so there was no basis for the manslaughter charge.

Neither was Kennedy an accomplice as Bosque had not committed an offence in injecting himself with heroin, as the Misuse of Drugs Act did not criminalise the act of injecting or otherwise administering drugs. As such, the only unlawful act committed by Kennedy was not a significant cause of Bosque's death, and no conviction of manslaughter could be reached. Accordingly, Kennedy's conviction for manslaughter was quashed.
