= Wells v Cooper =

Wells v. Cooper (1958) 2 All ER 527 is an England and Wales Court of Appeal judgment dealing with the issue of standard of care in English tort law. The question in the case was what standard of care could be expected of a person who carries out repairs in his own house negligently, so that his visitors get injured as a result.

== Facts ==
The defendant, Mr Cooper fixed a new handle to his back door. The plaintiff, Mr Wells, a visiting tradesman was leaving Cooper's house by the back door. When he pulled the door strongly in order to shut it, the handle came off and Wells fell, injuring himself. Expert evidence was given that Cooper should have used longer screws when attaching the handle.

== Judgment ==
The Court of Appeal held that the degree of care and skill required of a householder undertaking his own repairs was to be measured not by reference to his own degree of personal competence but by reference to the degree of care and skill which a reasonably skilled amateur carpenter might be expected to apply to the work in question. The safety of their work was not to be judged by reference to the contractual obligations that might be owed to a professional carpenter working for reward since that would be too high a standard. Therefore, Mr Wells lost the case because the trial judge found that in this case, Mr Cooper satisfied the standard of a reasonably skilled amateur carpenter.

== See also ==
- Breach of duty in English law
- Blyth v Birmingham Waterworks
- Bolam v. Friern Hospital Management Committee
- Wilsher v. Essex Area Health Authority
- Mullin v. Richards
