= Mullin v Richards =

Mullin v Richards [1998] 1 All ER 920 is a judgment of the Court of Appeal of England and Wales, dealing with liability of children under English law of negligence. The question in the case was what standard of behaviour could be expected of a child.

== Facts ==
The plaintiff and the defendant, two female friends of fifteen years old, were fencing with plastic rulers in their classroom. One of the rulers shattered and a piece of plastic flew into the plaintiff girl's eye, partially depriving her of sight.

== Judgment ==
The Court of Appeal found that the standard to be expected of a 15-year-old child was not the standard of a reasonable person, but that of a reasonable and "ordinarily prudent" 15-year-old. It was held that an ordinary prudent 15-year old could not have foreseen any injury when playing with rulers and the defendant was therefore found not liable in negligence.

== See also ==
- Standard of care in English law
- Breach of duty in English law
- Blyth v Birmingham Waterworks
- Bolam v Friern Hospital Management Committee
- Wilsher v Essex Area Health Authority
- Wells v Cooper
