= Philp v Ryan =

Irish Supreme Court case

- Court: Supreme Court of Ireland
- Full case name: Philp v Ryan & Anor
- Decided: 17 December 2004

Case history
- Appealed from: Philp v Ryan [2004] IEHC 77

Case opinions
- Decision by: Fennelly J

Philp v Ryan & Anor [2004] IESC 105 is an Irish tort law case concerning the actionability of the 'loss of chance' doctrine in medical negligence. Contrary to the position in England and Wales consolidated in Gregg v Scott, the Supreme Court of Ireland awarded compensation to the plaintiff for their loss of life expectancy caused by the defendant's negligence, despite the lack of proof on the balance of probabilities that Mr Philp would have otherwise recovered.

== Facts ==
The plaintiff, David Philp, was referred to Bon Secours Hospital in Cork by his general practitioner, after complaining of abdominal pain. There, the defendant negligently failed to diagnose Mr Philp with prostate cancer, and instead began treatment for prostatitis. Consequently, by the time the correct diagnosis was made 8 months later, the cancer had advanced, although it was unclear to what extent the progression was affected by the delayed treatment.

Under Fennelly J's discussion of the loss of chance doctrine in the Supreme Court, the question was whether Mr Philp could establish factual causation between his lost chance of recovery and the defendant's negligence. In short, 'but for' the defendant's negligence, was there a greater than 50% chance that Mr Philp would have recovered. In this case, the lost chance related to loss of life expectancy, meaning the court compared possible life expectancy before and after the negligent act. A similar approach was taken by the minority in Gregg v Scott, who found it inappropriate to regard the plaintiff's lost chance as their lost chance of recovery when dealing with a pre-existing condition that was always going to be terminable or otherwise incurable.

== Judgment ==
In the High Court, Mr Philp was awarded €45,000 to compensate for the psychological distress he suffered as a result of his negligently delayed diagnosis and treatment. This was later increased to €100,000 by the Supreme Court. At first instance, the trial judge observed medical expertise presented by Mr Denis Murphy, a consultant Urologist, who stated in his report that "it is not clear that the delay in initiating treatment was detrimental to Mr Philp's progress." There was no evidence presented of the plaintiff's initial chances of survival, which is anomalous with the majority of loss of a chance case law. The trial judge, Peart J, considered it inappropriate to suggest that delayed treatment had no effect on Mr Philp's recovery prospects, despite the lack of statistical evidence:

'It would not be reasonable assume that the delay of some eight months in making the correct diagnosis had no adverse effect on the plaintiff's life expectancy and quality of life, and it is not reasonable for the first-named defendant to say that by not knowing that he had cancer, he was better off in the sense that he could go about his life during that right months free of knowing that he had a serious condition. That would be to deny the plaintiff his basic right to be informed about a serious matter regarding his health, and his right to plan his future in the light of that knowledge.'

Consequently, Fennelly J, who presented the leading judgement in the Supreme Court, concluded that Mr Philp should be awarded damages in recognition of his lost chance, which he equated with an "increased risk of shorter life expectancy:"

'[I]t seems to me to be contrary to instinct and logic that a plaintiff should not be entitled to be compensated for the fact that, due to the negligent diagnosis of his medical condition, he has been deprived of appropriate medical advice and the consequent opportunity to avail of treatment which might improve his condition. I can identify no contrary principle of law or justice. It is commonplace that allowance is made in awards and in settlements for the risk that an injured patient may in the future develop arthritis in an injured joint. The risk may be high or low - a fifteen percent risk is often mentioned but damages are paid. I cannot agree that this is any different from what is sought in the present case. It does not matter that the damage suffered by the plaintiff consists of the loss of an opportunity to avail of treatment. It might, with equal logic, be described as an increased risk of shorter life expectancy. It seems to me as illogical to award damages for probable future injury as if it were a certainty, as to withhold them where the risk is low on the basis that it will not happen at all.'

In agreement with Fennelly J, McCracken J further quantified the plaintiff's entitlement to aggravated damages to compensate for mental distress caused by the defendant. He awarded Mr Philp €50,000 in addition to the €45,000 found at first instance. The total damages awarded increased to €100,000 in recognition of Mr Philp's possible lost chance of a longer life expectancy, for which he was awarded €5,000.

== See also ==
- Gregg v Scott - contrary verdict
- Hotson v East Berkshire Area Health Authority - contrary verdict
- Loss of chance
- List of Irish Supreme Court cases
