= Corr v IBC Vehicles Ltd =

English tort law case

- Court: House of Lords
- Citation: [2008] UKHL 13, [2008] AC 884

Corr v IBC Vehicles Ltd [2008] UKHL 13 is an English tort law case, concerning causation between a breach of duty and damage.

== Facts ==
Deceased killed himself after becoming depressed following a bad accident that IBC Vehicles was responsible for.

== Judgment ==
The House of Lords rejected that suicide was a novus actus interveniens that prevented the widow claiming loss of deependency under the Fatal Accidents Act 1976.

Lord Bingham, rational of the novus actus principle was it is not fair to hold a defendant liable for damage caused by someone else. An example of a new cause was ‘a voluntary, informed decision taken by the victim as an adult of sound mind.’ But the suicide was not a voluntary, informed decision of this kind. It was a response of a man suffering severe mental illness, impairing his capacity.

Lord Neuberger [65] asked whether deceased had ‘no real “fault” ... for his suicide.’ Majority held suicide did justify reduction in damages for contributory negligence. He retained some capacity.

== See also ==
- English tort law
