= R v Mubila =

South African and Zimbabwean case law

- Court: Southern Rhodesia, Bulawayo
- Full case name: R v Mubila
- Decided: 17 August 1955
- Citation: 1956 (1) SA 31 (SR)

Court membership
- Judge sitting: Beadle J and assessors

Case opinions
- Decision by: Beadle J

Keywords
- Criminal law, Murder, Causation, Novus actus interveniens, Proximate cause

R v Mubila is an important case in South African and Zimbabwean criminal law, heard on August 17, 1955, in which the accused was charged with murder. DP McCormac appeared for the Crown, and John Morris for the accused.

Its significance lies particularly in the area of legal causation. The court expressed negatively the idea of a proximate cause, with the statement that there must be no novus actus interveniens between X's conduct and Y's death; it also expressed it positively, in the contention that Y's death must follow directly from X's conduct.

The court held that, when a complainant has been injured as the result of an assault upon him, he has no obligation to obtain medical assistance to alleviate the gravity of the wound. Nor is there any obligation on him to follow rigidly all the advice given him by his medical advisers if he does seek that assistance. Provided that, in disregarding that advice, he does not introduce some new danger which would not have existed had the advice never been taken at all, his failure to follow that advice cannot be a factor which can avail the accused in any argument that the original injury was not the cause of death.

== See also ==
- South African criminal law
