= S v Counter =

South African legal case

In S v Counter, an important case in South African criminal law, the appellant had shot the deceased, lodging a bullet in her buttock. Unbeknownst either to her or to her doctors, the bullet had penetrated her anal canal, causing virulent septicaemia and leading to the pneumonia from which she died two weeks later. It fell to the Supreme Court of Appeal of South Africa to decide whether it was the shot fired or rather medical negligence which had caused the death:

The sequence of events from the time of the deceased's admission [to hospital] until her death was not interrupted by any causal factor which affected or changed the natural order of events, more particularly there was no intervention or omission by the persons responsible for her care [...]. It is inconceivable in these circumstances that the appellant should not be held responsible for the consequences of his actions, which led directly to his wife's death by stages entirely predictable and in accordance with human experience.

There was, in other words, no novus actus interveniens which could exclude the liability of the accused. He was accordingly found guilty.
