= Carslogie Steamship Co v Royal Norwegian Government =

Carslogie Steamship Co Ltd v Royal Norwegian Government
- Court: House of Lords
- Full case name: Carslogie Steamship Co Ltd v Royal Norwegian Government
- Decided: 29 November 1951
- Citation: [1952] AC 292, [1952] 1 All ER 20, [1951] 2 Lloyd's Rep 441, 95 Sol Jo 801, [1951] 2 TLR 1099
- Transcript: judgment

Court membership
- Judges sitting: Viscount Jowitt, Lord Normand, Lord Morton of Henryton, Lord Tucker, Lord Asquith of Bishopstone

Keywords
- Contract; Shipping; Damages; Negligence; Causation

Carslogie Steamship Co Ltd v Royal Norwegian Government [1952] is a House of Lords English tort law judgment. The case examines whether a negligent act that causes loss is also to be considered as the proximate cause of further subsequent loss.

== Facts ==
On 26 November 1949 the vessel Heimgar, while under time charter to the Ministry of Transport, suffered damage in a collision with the Carslogie. It was admitted that the Carslogie was solely to blame. Temporary repairs to the Heimgar were affected in England before she departed to the United States, where permanent repairs were to be carried out. During the Atlantic crossing, the ship sustained storm damage, which necessitated further repair. The Heimgar was in dock for fifty days whilst repairs were carried out for both the collision damage and the storm damage. It had been agreed that ten days would be allocated to the collision repair and thirty days for the weather damage. The owners of the Heimgar claimed damages for the ten days in port attributable to the collision damage.

== Judgment ==
The owners of the Carslogie were held liable only for the loss suffered by the Heimgar which was a direct result of the collision with the Carslogie. The House of Lords held that the storm was a novus actus interveniens that broke the chain of causation. The defendant was not liable for any subsequent loss that arose from the storm encounter.

This House of Lords decision was later referred to in Jobling v. Associated Dairies [1982] AC 794.

== See also ==
- English contract law
