= Compensation Act 2006 =

Public General Act of Parliament of the United Kingdom

- Act of Parliament
- Parliament of the United Kingdom
- Long title: An Act to specify certain factors that may be taken into account by a court determining a claim in negligence or breach of statutory duty; to make provision about damages for mesothelioma; and to make provision for the regulation of claims management services.
- Citation: 2006 c. 29
- Introduced by: Baroness Ashton Department of Constitutional Affairs, 2 November 2005
- Territorial extent: England and Wales, but sections 3 and 16(3) to (6) also extend to Scotland and Northern Ireland.

Dates
- Royal assent: 26 July 2006
- Commencement: from 26 July 2006, s.3 retrospective

Status: Amended

History of passage through Parliament

Text of statute as originally enacted

Revised text of statute as amended

The Compensation Act 2006 (c. 29) is an act of the Parliament of the United Kingdom, introduced in response to concerns about a growing compensation culture but conversely to ensure that the public received dependable service from claims management companies. In introducing the Bill, Baroness Ashton said that it was intended "to tackle perceptions that can lead to a disproportionate fear of litigation and risk averse behaviour; to find ways to discourage and resist bad claims; and to improve the system for those with a valid claim for compensation."

The act brought in specific changes to the law of liability and damages in negligence and breach of statutory duty. It further introduced a scheme of regulation for claims management companies.

== Liability ==
Section 1 of the Act makes statutory provision that, in determining whether the omission of certain steps amounts to a breach of duty, the court may consider whether such steps, had they been performed, would prevent some desirable activity. For example, the court must consider whether precautionary and defensive measures might prevent something socially useful. Though this principle had often been observed by the common law, the Act places it on a statutory footing.

Section 2 stipulates that, in the event of an accident, an apology or offer or redress, such as paying for medical treatment, is not, of itself an admission of liability.

Sections 1 and 2 came into force on royal assent on 25 July 2006 (s.16(1)).

== Damages ==
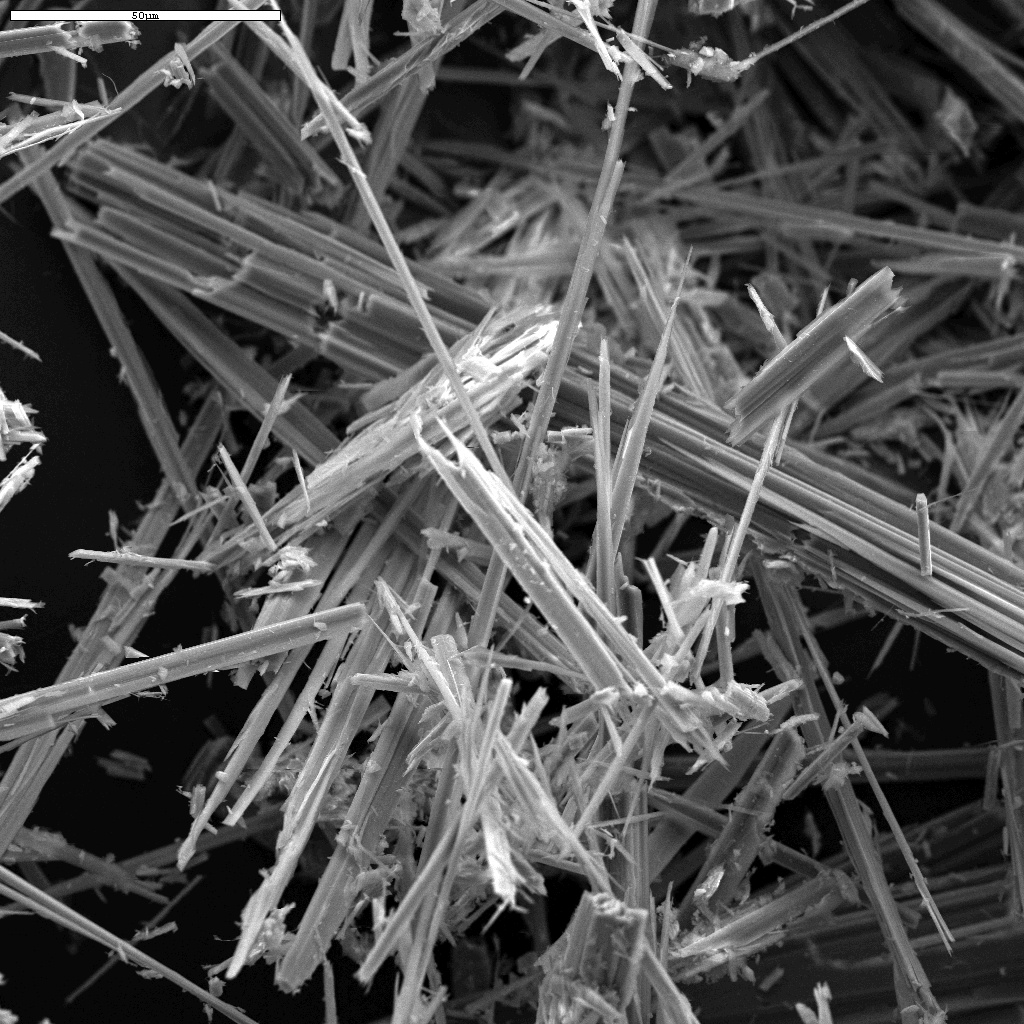
Asbestos fibres - a single fibre is believed to cause mesothelioma

Section 3 reverses the common law rule on allocation of damages in various mesothelioma claims arising from unlawful exposure to asbestos.

In 2002, the House of Lords ruled in Fairchild v Glenhaven Funeral Services Ltd that, where several parties had unlawfully exposed the claimant to asbestos and risk of pleural and peritoneal mesothelioma, all were liable for his injury, even though the claimant could not prove which individual party had provided the asbestos fibers that cause the disease. However, in Barker v Corus (UK) plc the House of Lords took Fairchild further and held that the parties who contributed to the risk were severally but not jointly liable. This meant that any single tortfeasor was liable to compensate the loss that the claimant suffered from mesothelioma only to the extent that that tortfeasor was itself responsible for the increase in risk. E.g. if the tortfeasor that the claimant chose to sue was found to have only contributed 20% of the total increase in risk, then the claimant was awarded damages at 20% of the total loss that he is reckoned to have suffered as a result of the mesothelioma. This meant that if the claimant wanted to be compensated for his full loss, he had to separately sue all tortfeasors.

Section 3 effectively reversed the House of Lords decision in Barker by making all tortfeasors jointly and severally liable for the mesothelioma so that a claimant can recover compensatory damages for their full loss from any individual tortfeasor that materially increased the risk of mesothelioma. If a claimant does so, then the sued tortfeasor has the right to claim a contribution from any and all other tortfeasors that also materially increased that risk, proportionate to the extent by which each tortfeasor increased that risk.

To illustrate, if X gets mesothelioma from exposure at work, and he has worked for companies A Ltd., B Ltd., and C Ltd., each of which materially increased the risk of mesothelioma occurring in him, then X can choose any of the companies to sue. Suppose X sues C Ltd., then the court will award to X, and order C Ltd. to pay, damages totalling compensation for all of the loss he has suffered due to mesothelioma (i.e. 100%). Thereafter, C Ltd. can bring proceedings against A Ltd. and B Ltd., demanding from each a payment of a proportion of the total damages C was ordered to pay to X, corresponding to the proportion by which each company increased the risk of mesothelioma of the total increase in risk in X.

Further, section 3 is "treated as having always had effect" (s.16(3)) and also extends to Scotland and Northern Ireland (s.17).

== Claims management companies ==
Part 2 of the Act seeks to regulate the provision of claims management services. As of 23 April 2007, an individual or a corporation may not provide claims management services by way of business unless authorised, exempt or otherwise in receipt of a waiver (s.4(1)). The Act creates a Claims Management Services Regulator to authorise and regulate claims management companies and to (s.5):

- Set and monitor standards of competence and professional conduct;
- Promote good practice, in particular as to the provision of information about charges and other matters to users;
- Promote practices likely to facilitate competition;
- Ensure that arrangements are made for the protection of users, including complaints handling.

It is a crime for an unauthorised person to provide or offer claims management services, or to pretend to be authorised. Offenders are punishable, on summary conviction, by a fine of up to level 5 on the standard scale or 51 weeks' imprisonment. If convicted on indictment in the Crown Court, offenders can be sentenced to an unlimited fine or two years' imprisonment (ss.7 and 11). Where a corporate crime is committed, the offender can only be fined and not imprisoned. The Regulator may investigate unauthorised trading and seek an injunction to prevent it or bring a criminal prosecution (s.8). It is a crime to obstruct the Regulator, punishable on summary conviction by a fine of up to level 5 on the standard scale (s.10).

Section 12 creates a Claims Management Services Tribunal to which a person may appeal a decision of the Regulator about authorisation (s.13(1)). There is a further route of appeal to the Court of Appeal (s.13(4)). The Regulator may also refer complaints or questions about the professional conduct of a claims management company to the Tribunal (s.13(2)).

Part 2 came progressively into force from 1 December 2006. As of March 2008, only section 13(2) (referrals to the Tribunal by the Regulator) remains to be brought into force.

== Section 16 - Commencement ==
The following orders have been made under this section:

- The Compensation Act 2006 (Commencement No. 1) Order 2006 (S.I. 2006/3005 (C. 107))
- The Compensation Act 2006 (Commencement No. 2) Order 2007 (S.I. 2007/94 (C. 5))
- The Compensation Act 2006 (Commencement No. 3) Order 2007 (S.I. 2007/922 (C. 36))

== Bibliography ==
- "Compensation Act 2006". Department of Constitutional Affairs. 2006.
- The Compensation Act 2006, as amended from the National Archives.
- The Compensation Act 2006, as originally enacted from the National Archives.
- Explanatory notes to the Compensation Act 2006.
