= Hotson v East Berkshire Area Health Authority =

1987 English tort law case

- Court: House of Lords
- Decided: 30 July 1987
- Citation: [1987] AC 750, [1987] 2 All ER 909, [1988] UKHL 1

Court membership
- Judges sitting: Lord Bridge of Harwich; Lord Brandon of Oakbrook; Lord MacKay of Clashfern; Lord Ackner; Lord Goff of Chieveley

Keywords
- causation, loss of chance

Hotson v East Berkshire Area Health Authority [1988] UKHL 1 is an English tort law case, about the nature of causation. It rejects the idea that people can sue doctors for the loss of a chance to get better, when doctors fail to do as good a job as they could have done.

== Facts ==
A 13-year-old boy fell out of a tree. He went to hospital where his hip was examined, but an incorrect diagnosis was made. After 5 days it was found that he was suffering from avascular necrosis. This was more advanced and serious than if it had been spotted straight away. By the age of 20 years, there was deformity of the hip joint, restricted mobility and permanent disability. The judge found that even if the diagnosis had made correctly, there was still a 75% risk of the plaintiff's disability developing, but that the medical staff's breach of duty had turned that risk into an inevitability, thereby denying the plaintiff a 25% chance of a good recovery. At first instance, damages were quantified at £11,500 representing 25% of the full value of the damages awardable for the plaintiff's disability.

The issue was whether the claimant had satisfied the burden of proof in establishing that the defendant's actions had probably factually caused his injury.

== Judgment ==
On appeal to the Lords, the question was whether the cause of the injury was the fall or the health authority's negligence in delaying treatment, since if the fall had caused the injury the negligence of the authority was irrelevant in regard to the plaintiff's disability. In the House of Lords, Lord Bridge of Harwich considered the evidence presented by the plaintiff's medical expert, who concluded that: '[s]tatistically, on reports published, he had a marginally better chance of escaping it than having avascular necrosis had it been treated expeditiously.' Consequently, Lord Bridge rejected the trial judge's position on damages, finding that on the balance of probabilities, even correct diagnosis and treatment would not have prevented the disability from occurring. It followed that the plaintiff had failed on the issue of factual causation, as they were unable to meet the legal standard of proof:

'The authority's evidence was that the sole cause was the original traumatic injury to the hip. The plaintiff's evidence, at its highest, was that the delay in treatment was a material contributory cause. This was a conflict, like any other about some relevant past event, which the judge could not avoid resolving on a balance of probabilities. Unless the plaintiff proved on a balance of probabilities that the delayed treatment was at least a material contributory cause of the avascular necrosis he failed on the issue of causation and no question of quantification could arise. But the judge's findings of fact [...] are unmistakably to the effect that on the balance of probabilities the injury caused by the plaintiff's fall left insufficient blood vessels intact to keep the epiphysis alive. This amounts to a finding of fact that the fall was the sole care of the avascular necrosis.'

This finding relies on the principle outlined by Lord Diplock in Mallett v McMonagle, as expressly applied by Lord Mackay in this case, that '[in] determining what did happen in the past the court decides on the balance of probabilities. Anything that is more probable than not it treats as certain.' It became a legal certainty that there was no causal relationship between the defendant's negligence and the plaintiff's lost chance of recovery, as this was not established as a probability. Consequently, the defendant's appeal was allowed and the plaintiff's damages were revoked.

== See also ==
- Gregg v Scott, a recent case affirming this view of loss of a chance
- Philp v Ryan: Irish case giving effect to the loss of a chance doctrine in a medical negligence (not binding as UK precedent)
- Negligence
- Tort
- Loss of chance
