= Barker v Corus (UK) plc =

House of Lords decision

- Court: House of Lords
- Decided: 3 May 2006
- Citations: [2006] 2 WLR 1027, [2006] UKHL 20, [2006] 2 AC 572

Case history
- Prior action: [2004] EWCA Civ 545

Court membership
- Judges sitting: Lord Hoffmann, Lord Scott of Foscote, Lord Rodger of Earlsferry, Lord Walker of Gestingthorpe, Baroness Hale of Richmond

Barker v Corus (UK) plc [2006] UKHL 20 is a notable House of Lords decision in the area of industrial liability in English tort law, which deals with the area of causation. In this case, the House of Lords reconsidered its ruling in the earlier landmark case Fairchild v Glenhaven Funeral Services Ltd concerning the liability of multiple tortfeasors.

The main question in this case was whether the solvent employers should pick up the proportion of the damage for which the insolvent employers were responsible. In other words, should a tortfeasor or a claimant bear the risk of the other tortfeasors going insolvent?

== Facts ==
Like in Fairchild v Glenhaven Funeral Services Ltd, the claimants had contracted mesothelioma after having worked for a number of different employers, all of whom had negligently exposed them to asbestos. What distinguishes this case from Fairchild is that the conduct of the employers of the claimants were not exclusively tortious. Mesothelioma is a fatal illness which is caused by exposure to asbestos, but the risk of which increases depending on how often one is exposed. Because of long latency periods (it takes 25 to 50 years before symptoms of disease become evident) it was impossible to know which employer actually caused the disease, although all of them admittedly increased the risk of the disease occurring. Unlike Fairchild, in which the House of Lords held that all the employers were jointly and severally liable for the damage, in this case some of the employers have become insolvent.

== Judgment ==
The House of Lords, by a majority, accepted the argument that the solvent employer should not be jointly and severally liable, but only proportionately liable. Lord Hoffmann said the following.

In my opinion, the attribution of liability according to the relative degree of contribution to the chance of the disease being contracted would smooth the roughness of the justice which a rule of joint and several liability creates. The defendant was a wrongdoer, it is true, and should not be allowed to escape liability altogether, but he should not be liable for more than the damage which he caused and, since this is a case in which science can deal only in probabilities, the law should accept that position and attribute liability according to probabilities. The justification for the joint and several liability rule is that if you caused harm, there is no reason why your liability should be reduced because someone else also caused the same harm. But when liability is exceptionally imposed because you may have caused harm, the same considerations do not apply and fairness suggests that if more than one person may have been responsible, liability should be divided according to the probability that one or other caused the harm.

== Significance ==
The outcome was a new concept of "proportionate liability". So for example, Mr B has worked for employers X, Y, and Z for ten years each. X, Y and Z have all exposed Mr B to asbestos, and it is not possible to say with which employer Mr B had contracted a disease. But now X and Y have gone insolvent, and Mr B is suing Z. Under the Barker v. Corus principle, Z would only have to pay one third of the full compensation for Mr B's disease, in other words, Z has only "proportionate liability" for that part which he materially increased the risk of Mr B's harm. This outcome was advocated by a number of academics.

After the decision in Barker, there was a swift and fierce political backlash, with large numbers of workers, families, trade unions, and Members of Parliament calling for the reversal of the ruling. This was on the basis that it would undermine full compensation for working people and their families. Soon enough the Compensation Act 2006 was introduced, specifically to reverse the ruling. However the Act only applies to mesothelioma. What remains to be seen is whether the "proportionate liability" idea will crop up in other situations.

The essential decision to be made is whether a tortfeasor or a claimant should bear the risk of other tortfeasors going insolvent. It is important to keep in mind, that in the example above, Z may not have actually caused any harm. Moreover, it might have been that Z in fact caused all the harm.

== See also ==
- Bailey v Ministry of Defence
- Fairchild v Glenhaven Funeral Services Ltd
- Negligence
- Asbestos and the law
- English tort law
- Causation
