= McGhee v National Coal Board =

1972 English tort law case

- Court: House of Lords
- Full case name: McGhee v National Coal Board
- Decided: 15 November 1972
- Transcript: judgment

Case history
- Prior action: [1972] 3 All E.R. 1008, 1 W.L.R. 1

Court membership
- Judges sitting: Lord Reid, Lord Wilberforce, Lord Simon of Glaisdale, Lord Kilbrandon, Lord Salmon

Keywords
- Tort, negligence, factual causation,

McGhee v National Coal Board [1972] UKHL 7, 1 W.L.R. 1, is a leading tort case decided by the House of Lords. The Lords held that where a breach of duty has a material effect on the likelihood of injury then the subsequent injury will be said to have been caused by the breach. This approach was taken to resolve injustice arising from the orthodox 'but for' test for factual causation. Otherwise, under the 'but for' test, multiple potential causes of harm would hold equal causal weighting, making it impossible to establish a greater than 50% probability of one cause.

== Facts ==
James McGhee was employed to clean out brick kilns and developed dermatitis from the accumulation of coal dust on his skin. Because there were no shower facilities at his workplace, he would cycle home each day, increasing the risk he would contract dermatitis. Had his employer provided shower facilities, the coal dust could have been washed off before cycling, reducing the risk of contracting dermatitis. Due to the limits of scientific knowledge, it was impossible to rule out the possibility that he hadn't contracted dermatitis during the non-wrongful exposure to brick dust while working in the kiln.

He sued his employer for negligence for breaching its duty to provide proper washing facilities. The issue before the House of Lords was whether the failure to provide the washing facilities had caused the rash, or if it was simply triggered by exposure to the brick dust and the lack of washing facilities had no material effect to the plaintiff's health.

== Judgment ==
The House of Lords held that the risk of harm had been materially increased by the prolonged exposure to the dust, as resulting from the defendant's negligent failure to provide the appropriate washing facilities. Lord Reid stated:

"The effect of such abrasion of the skin is cumulative in the sense that the longer a subject is exposed to injury the greater the chance of his developing dermatitis: it is for that reason that immediate washing is well recognised as a proper precaution."

"The medical evidence is to the effect that the fact that the man had to cycle home caked with grime and sweat added materially to the risk"

The material increase in risk was treated as equivalent to a material contribution to damage. The implication of the case was significant as it meant that a claimant need not demonstrate that the defendant's actions were the "but for" cause of the injury, but instead that the defendant's actions materially increased the risk of injury, and thus damage, to the claimant. Indeed, there was no evidence to suggest that without the defendant's negligence the plaintiff would have avoided contracting dermatitis. Consequently, the decision has been criticised as creating a "legal fiction" by equating the defendant increasing the risk of harm with a causation in fact. The judgement was subsequently questioned by the House of Lords in Barker v Corus, wherein the defendant's material contribution to risk was instead constructed as their causation of a lost chance for the plaintiff to avoid the harm. Lord Walker considered "increase in risk" to be the direct mirror of "loss of a chance."

== See also ==
- English tort law
- In re Beverly Hills Fire Litigation (1982) 695 F 2d 207, doubting
- Nowsco Well Service Ltd v Canadian Propane Gas & Oil Ltd (1981) 122 DLR (3d) 228, trouble following
- Wilsher v Essex Area Health Authority [1988] AC 1074, distinguishing
- Fairchild v Glenhaven Funeral Services Ltd [2002] UKHL 22, applying
- Barker v Corus [2006] UKHL 20
