= Gregg v Scott =

2005 English tort law case

- Court: House of Lords
- Decided: 27 January 2005
- Citation: [2005] UKHL 2

Keywords
- Negligence, loss of a chance

Gregg v Scott [2005] UKHL 2 is an English tort law case, on the issue of loss of a chance, in causation. It affirms the principle of Hotson v East Berkshire Area Health Authority, on a narrow margin of 3 to 2. Lord Nicholls' dissent is of particular note, in arguing that loss of a chance should be actionable.

== Facts ==
The defendant, Dr Scott, negligently misdiagnosed the plaintiff's malignant cancer, (non-Hodgkin Lymphoma) stating it to be a benign collection of fatty tissue and thus no further treatment was needed. This had the effect of delaying Mr Gregg's treatment by nine months, reducing his chances of surviving for ten years from 42% to 25%.

Under the earlier decision of Hotson v East Berkshire Area Health Authority ("Hotson"), the view taken at first instance, and by the Court of Appeal, the claimant could not establish that the defendant had prevented him being cured, as his original chance of a cure was below 50%. The plaintiff argued that he was entitled to recover for the loss of the 17% chance the defendant had deprived him of. The issue was whether the claimant could claim for their 'loss of a chance'.

== Judgment ==
=== The majority ===
On appeal to the Lords, the majority upheld the earlier decision in Hotson. Damages were not recoverable because Mr Gregg failed to prove on the balance of probabilities that Dr Scott's negligence resulted in the loss of a chance of recovery. Had the doctor properly diagnosed Mr Gregg at the time, he would still have had a less than 50% chance of surviving (42%).

Lord Hoffman notes in his judgment that 'reduction in the prospect of a favourable outcome' had been accepted in previous cases (Chaplin v Hicks [1911]), what was in doubt was whether loss of a chance can be applicable in cases involving clinical negligence.

The majority judges also shared the view that imposing liability on the defendants in this case would result in a significant change in the law, hence, should be left to Parliament to decide whether or not changes should be made. Although Lord Hoffman noted cases in other jurisdictions that gave effect to loss of a chance claims where the plaintiff was unable to meet the factual causation standards of liability, such as in the Irish case of Philp v Ryan, he concluded that these were contrary to overriding UK authorities that would be inappropriate to 'abandon:'

I respectfully agree. And in my opinion, the various control mechanisms proposed to confine liability for loss of a chance within artificial limits do not pass this test. But a wholesale adoption of possible rather than probable causation as the criterion of liability would be so radical a change in our law as to amount to a legislative act. It would have enormous consequences for insurance companies and the National Health Service. In company with my noble and learned friends Lord Phillips of Worth Matravers and Baroness Hale of Richmond, I think that any such change should be left to Parliament.

Further, while Lord Hoffman also recognises academic criticism of applying causation in this manner, expanding the exception in Fairchild would be too 'radical':

84. Academic writers have suggested that in cases of clinical negligence, the need to prove causation is too restrictive of liability. This argument has appealed to judges in some jurisdictions; in some, but not all, of the States of the United States and most recently in New South Wales and Ireland: Rufo v Hosking (1 November 2004) [2004] NSWCA 391); Philp v Ryan (17 December 2004) [2004] 1 IESC 105. In the present case it is urged that Mr Gregg has suffered a wrong and ought to have a remedy. Living for more than 10 years is something of great value to him and he should be compensated for the possibility that the delay in diagnosis may have reduced his chances of doing so. In effect, the appellant submits that the exceptional rule in Fairchild should be generalised and damages awarded in all cases in which the defendant may have caused an injury and has increased the likelihood of the injury being suffered. In the present case, it is alleged that Dr Scott may have caused a reduction in Mr Gregg's expectation of life and that he increased the likelihood that his life would be shortened by the disease.

85. It should first be noted that adopting such a rule would involve abandoning a good deal of authority. The rule which the House is asked to adopt is the very rule which it rejected in Wilsher's case [1988] AC 1074. Yet Wilsher's case was expressly approved by the House in Fairchild [2003] 1 AC 32. Hotson [1987] AC 750 too would have to be overruled. Furthermore, the House would be dismantling all the qualifications and restrictions with which it so recently hedged the Fairchild exception. There seem to me to be no new arguments or change of circumstances which could justify such a radical departure from precedent.

— Lord Hoffman, https://publications.parliament.uk/pa/ld200405/ldjudgmt/jd050127/greg-3.htm

=== Dissenting ===
However, Lord Nicholls (joined by Lord Hope) dissented in arguing that loss of a chance should be actionable:

In principle, the answer to this question is clear and compelling. In such cases, as in the economic 'loss of chance' cases, the law should recognise the manifestly unsatisfactory consequences which would follow from adopting an all-or-nothing balance of probability approach as the answer to this question. The law should recognise that Mr Gregg's prospects of recovery had he been treated promptly, expressed in percentage terms of likelihood, represent the reality of his position so far as medical knowledge is concerned. The law should be exceedingly slow to disregard medical reality in the context of a legal duty whose very aim is to protect medical reality. In these cases a doctor's duty to act in the best interests of his patient involves maximising the patient's recovery prospects, and doing so whether the patient's prospects are good or not so good. In the event of a breach of this duty the law must fashion a matching and meaningful remedy. A patient should have an appropriate remedy when he loses the very thing it was the doctor's duty to protect. To this end the law should recognise the existence and loss of poor and indifferent prospects as well as those more favourable.

Application of the all-or-nothing balance of probability approach in the 'Gregg' type of cases would not achieve this object. In such cases the law should therefore put aside this approach when considering what would have happened had there been no negligence. It cannot be right to adopt a procedure having the effect that, in law, a patient's prospects of recovery are treated as non-existent whenever they exist but fall short of 50%. If the law were to proceed in this way it would deserve to be likened to the proverbial ass. Where a patient's condition is attended with such uncertainty that medical opinion assesses the patient's recovery prospects in percentage terms, the law should do likewise. The law should not, by adopting the all-or-nothing balance of probability approach, assume certainty where none in truth exists: see Deane J in Commonwealth of Australia v Amann Aviation Pty Ltd (1991) 66 ALJR 123, 147. The difference between good and poor prospects is a matter going to the amount of compensation fairly payable, not to liability to make payment at all. As Dore J said in Herskovits v Group Health Cooperative of Puget Sound (1983) 664 P 2d 474, 477:

'To decide otherwise would be a blanket release from liability for doctors and hospitals any time there was less than a 50 per cent chance of survival, regardless of how flagrant the negligence.'

The way ahead must surely be to recognise that where a patient is suffering from illness or injury and his prospects of recovery are attended with a significant degree of medical uncertainty, and he suffers a significant diminution of his prospects of recovery by reason of medical negligence whether of diagnosis or treatment, that diminution constitutes actionable damage. This is so whether the patient's prospects immediately before the negligence exceeded or fell short of 50%. 'Medical uncertainty' is uncertainty inherent in the patient's condition, uncertainty which medical opinion cannot resolve. This is to be contrasted with uncertainties arising solely from differences of view expressed by witnesses. Evidential uncertainties of this character should be resolved in the usual way.

This approach would represent a development of the law. So be it. If the common law is to retain its legitimacy it must remain capable of development. It must recognise the great advances made in medical knowledge and skills. It must recognise also the medical uncertainties which still exist. The law must strive to achieve a result which is fair to both parties in present-day conditions. The common law's ability to develop in this way is its proudest boast. But the present state of the law on this aspect of medical negligence, far from meeting present-day requirements of fairness, generates continuing instinctive judicial unease, exemplified in this country post-Hotson by Latham LJ's dissenting judgment in the present case, and observations of Andrew Smith J in Smith v National Health Service Litigation [2001] Lloyd's Med Rep 90 and the Court of Appeal in Coudert Brothers v Normans Bay Ltd (27 February 2004, unreported). In the latter case Waller LJ and Carnwath LJ expressed 'disquiet' at the Court of Appeal decision in the present case. Laws LJ said he was 'driven to an unhappy sense that the common law has lost its way': paragraphs 32, 66-68 and 69.

The reason for this disquiet is not far to seek. The present state of the law is crude to an extent bordering on arbitrariness. It means that a patient with a 60% chance of recovery reduced to a 40% prospect by medical negligence can obtain compensation. But he can obtain nothing if his prospects were reduced from 40% to nil. This is rough justice indeed. By way of contrast, the approach set out above meets the perceived need for an appropriate remedy in both these situations and does no more than reflect fairly and rationally the loss suffered by a patient in these situations.

The full judgment is available here.

== See also ==
- Hotson v East Berkshire Area Health Authority
- Negligence
