= Chaplin v Hicks =

English contract law case

- Sir Seymour Hicks
- Court: Court of Appeal of England and Wales
- Decided: 16 May 1911
- Citation: [1911] 2 KB 786

Keywords
- Contract, remedies

Chaplin v Hicks [1911] 2 KB 786 is an English contract law case, concerning the right to damages for loss of chance after a breach of contract.

== Facts ==
Seymour Hicks, a well-known actor and theatrical manager, invited women to submit their photographs to compete in a beauty contest where the winners would be chosen by the readers of one newspaper. He promised to give engagements as actresses to the winners. Ms Chaplin submitted her photograph and came first in her section, which entitled her to be considered for one of the twelve finalists. The notice reached her too late, and she was not able to make the appointment with Mr Hicks. She sued Mr Hicks for damages for breach of contract to compensate her for the loss of a chance to be selected for an engagement.

== Judgment ==
The Court of Appeal upheld a £100 award for the loss of the chance at winning the contest, awarded by the jury.

Vaughan Williams LJ dismissed the arguments that the damages were either (1) too remote or (2) unassessable.

== Application ==
In a case relating to planning permission, Obagi v Stanborough (Developments) Ltd. (1993), Stanborough had been in breach of contract in failing to apply for planning permission. Obagi sought recovery of his loss of profit, i.e. the difference between the value of the site and what he would have had to pay for it. Mr Justice Blackburne considered that, so long as the chance was more substantial that "a mere possibility", there was no essential difference between the evaluation of the defendant's chances of getting planning permission and Ms Chaplin's chances of winning a prize in Chaplin v Hicks. In this case Obagi had failed to demonstrate a real possibility and so the damages awarded were minimal.
