= Manslaughter in English law =

Crime in England and Wales

In the English law of homicide, manslaughter is a less serious offence than murder, the differential being between levels of fault based on the mens rea (Latin for "guilty mind") or by reason of a partial defence. In England and Wales, a common practice is to prefer a charge of murder, with the judge or defence able to introduce manslaughter as an option (see alternative verdict). The jury then decides whether the defendant is guilty or not guilty of either murder or manslaughter. On conviction for manslaughter, sentencing is at the judge's discretion, whereas a sentence of life imprisonment is mandatory on conviction for murder. Manslaughter may be either voluntary or involuntary, depending on whether the accused has the required mens rea for murder.

== Voluntary manslaughter ==
Voluntary manslaughter occurs when the defendant kills with mens rea (an intention to kill or cause grievous bodily harm), but one of those partial defences which reduce murder to manslaughter applies (these consist of mitigating circumstances which reduce the defendant's culpability). The original mitigating factors were provocation and chance medley which existed at common law, but the former has been abolished by statute, the latter has been held no longer to exist and new defences have been created by statute.

The Homicide Act 1957 now provides two defences which may be raised to allow the court to find the accused guilty of voluntary manslaughter: diminished responsibility and suicide pact. The Coroners and Justice Act 2009 creates the defence of "loss of control".

=== Diminished responsibility ===
Under section 2 of the Homicide Act 1957 there are three requirements for the defendant to raise the defence of diminished responsibility. The defendant must have suffered from an abnormality of mind at the time of the killing caused by one of the causes specified by the Act which substantially impaired the defendant's mental responsibility for the killing. Under section 2(2) of the Act it is for the defendant to prove he suffered from such a condition on the balance of probabilities.

==== Abnormality of mind ====
An abnormality of mind has been defined by Lord Parker CJ "as state of mind so different from that of ordinary human beings that the reasonable man would term it abnormal". In deciding whether this state of mind exists the jury should consider medical evidence, but also all other evidence including acts and statements of the accused and his demeanour. The jury does not have to accept the medical evidence if other material conflicts with and outweighs it.

==== Specified causes ====
The Homicide Act specifies three causes one of which must cause the abnormality; they are a condition of arrested or retarded development of mind, any inherent cause or a disease or injury. Whether the abnormality is caused by one of the specified causes is a matter for medical evidence alone. Alcoholism is capable of being an abnormality of mind even if there is no physical damage to the brain.

==== Substantial impairment of mental responsibility ====
Whether the abnormality substantially impaired the defendant's mental responsibility for the killing is a question of degree for the jury. In R v Lloyd the Court of Appeal held that the lack of control must simply be ‘more than trivial’.

Premenstrual tension (PMT) has been accepted as a mitigating factor in several high-profile cases. In 1980, Sandie Smith was convicted of manslaughter for stabbing a barmaid. Dr. Katharina Dalton who examined Smith before the trial diagnosed her with severe PMS. This diagnosis was accepted as a cause of diminished responsibility. Smith was sentenced to three years probation despite previous convictions for violent behaviour.

=== Loss of control ===
Loss of control is a partial defence to murder introduced by the Coroners and Justice Act 2009. It replaced the previous defence of provocation.

=== Suicide pacts ===
Section 4(1) of the Homicide Act 1957 introduced the defence of suicide pact. Parliament's intention was to show some compassion for those who had been involved in a suicide pact but failed to die. Section 4(3) defines a suicide pact as "a common agreement between two or more persons having for its object the death of all of them, whether or not each is to take his own life". Further the accused must have had a "settled intention of dying in pursuance of the pact" to avoid the accused entering into a supposed pact with the real intention of committing murder. The Law Commission has proposed abolishing the defence with deserving cases falling within diminished responsibility, but feels it should be retained pending a review of a new partial defence of mercy killings.

== Involuntary manslaughter ==
Involuntary manslaughter arises where the accused did not intend to cause death or serious injury but caused the death of another through recklessness or criminal negligence. For these purposes, recklessness is defined as a blatant disregard for the dangers of a particular situation. An example of this would be dropping a brick off a bridge, landing on a person's head, killing them. Assuming there is no intention to cause really serious harm, murder does not arise. But the act of dropping the brick is itself criminal, and where a criminal and dangerous act causes death, that will (generally) constitute manslaughter. This form of manslaughter is also termed "unlawful act" or "constructive" manslaughter.

=== Manslaughter by gross negligence ===
Under English law, where a person owes a duty of care (either by statute or by the neighbour principle) and is negligent to such a degree that consequently the law regards it as a crime (namely the person has been grossly negligent) and that person causes the victim to die, they may be liable for gross negligence manslaughter. The defendants in such cases are often people carrying out jobs that require special skills or care, such as doctors, teachers, police or prison officers, or electricians, who fail to meet the standard which could be expected from a reasonable person of the same profession. In R v Bateman the Court of Criminal Appeal held that gross negligence manslaughter involved the following elements:

1. the defendant owed a duty to the deceased to take care;
2. the defendant breached this duty;
3. the breach caused the death of the deceased; and
4. the defendant's negligence was gross, that is, it showed such a disregard for the life and safety of others as to amount to a crime and deserve punishment.

The House of Lords in Seymour sought to identify the mens rea for "motor manslaughter" (negligently causing death when driving a motor vehicle). Reference was made to R v Caldwell and R v Lawrence which held that a person was reckless if:

1. he did an act which in fact created an obvious and serious risk of injury to the person or substantial damage to property; and
2. when he did the act he either had not given any thought to the possibility of there being any such risk or had recognised that there was some risk involved and had nonetheless gone on to do it.

The conclusion was that for motor manslaughter (and, by implication, for all cases of gross negligence), it was more appropriate to adopt this definition of recklessness. Consequently, if the defendant created an obvious and serious risk of causing physical injury to someone, there could be liability whether there was simple inadvertence or conscious risk-taking. It was no longer a defence to argue that the negligence had not been gross. (The specific offence of motor manslaughter has largely been replaced by statutory offences of causing death by driving in the Road Traffic Act 1988.)

In R v Adomako an anaesthetist failed to notice that a tube had become disconnected from the ventilator and the patient died. Lord Mackay disapproved Seymour and held that the Bateman test of gross negligence was the appropriate test in manslaughter cases involving a breach of duty, allowing the jury to consider the accused's conduct in all the surrounding circumstances, and to convict only if the negligence was very serious. Individuals have a duty to act in the following situations:

- to care for certain defined classes of helpless relatives, e.g. spouses must take care of each other, and parents must look after their dependent children. In R v Stone and Dobinson an elderly woman with anorexia nervosa came to stay with her brother and his cohabitee, who were both of low intelligence, and subsequently starved herself to death. The Court of Appeal held that the question whether the couple owed a duty to care for the deceased was a question of fact for the jury, which was entitled to take into account the facts that she was a relative of one of the appellants, that she was occupying a room in his house, and that the other appellant had undertaken the duty to care for her by trying to wash her and taking food to her.
- where there is a contract (even if the person injured was outside the contractual relationship and, in the civil law would be barred by privity from enforcing the contract). In R v Pittwood, a railway crossing gatekeeper had opened the gate to let a cart pass and forgot to shut it again. Later a hay cart was struck by a train while crossing. He was convicted of manslaughter. It was argued on his behalf that he owed a duty only to his employers, the railway company, with whom he had contracted. Wright J, held, however, that the man was paid to keep the gate shut and protect the public so had a duty to act. In contracts relating both to employment and to the provision of services, R v Yaqoob considered a partner in a taxi firm who was responsible for making all necessary arrangements for the inspection and maintenance of a minibus which had overturned after its tyre burst, killing one of its passengers. He was convicted of manslaughter because the failure properly to maintain the minibus was the direct cause of the accident and there was an implied duty owed both to other members of the partnership and to those renting the vehicle, to inspect and maintain beyond the standard required for a MOT test, council inspections, and other duties imposed by regulation. The jury was competent to assess whether the failure to discharge that implied duty was gross negligence without hearing any expert evidence; these were not technical issues and they did not need expert help. The sentence of four years imprisonment was within the sentencing band and not excessive.

In Attorney-General's Reference (No 2 of 1999), a case on corporate manslaughter that arose out of the Southall rail crash, the Court of Appeal decided the defendant's subjective state of mind (i.e. whether there was conscious risk-taking) is irrelevant and, therefore, so is the question of recklessness, leaving the objective test as the only test for liability. Rose LJ said:

Although there may be cases where the defendant's state of mind is relevant to the jury's consideration when assessing the grossness and criminality of his conduct, evidence of his state of mind is not a pre-requisite to a conviction for manslaughter by gross negligence. The Adomako test is objective, but a defendant who is reckless as defined in Stone may well be the more readily found to be grossly negligent to a criminal degree. ...

In our judgment unless an identified individual's conduct, characterisable as gross criminal negligence, can be attributed to the company, the company is not, in the present state of the common law, liable for manslaughter.

Civil negligence rules are not apt to confer criminal liability; the identification principle remains the only basis in common law for corporate liability for gross negligence manslaughter (see imputation). This was the only persuasive authority for the law of manslaughter at large, but R v DPP, ex parte Jones, which said that the test of negligent manslaughter is objective, confirmed Attorney General's Reference (No 2 of 1999) as a correct general statement of law.

=== Death by dangerous driving ===
Because of a reluctance by juries to convict when the charge was manslaughter, a statutory offence of "causing death by dangerous driving" was introduced. Following the Road Traffic Law Review Committee (1988), the Road Traffic Act 1991 abandoned recklessness in favour of the pre-statutory objective test of "dangerousness", i.e. whether the driving fell far below the standard of the competent and careful driver and was obviously dangerous in the opinion of such a driver. The Committee also recommended that manslaughter should be an optional charge for the more serious driving cases. There is the possibility of charging an aggravated taking without consent or, since 2008, causing death by careless or inconsiderate driving, for less seriously dangerous driving where death results. An equivalent, in many American states, to motor manslaughter is vehicular homicide. An equivalent to causing death by dangerous driving in Canada under the Criminal Code is causing death by criminal negligence.

=== Manslaughter by an unlawful and dangerous act ===
Under English law, according to R v Creamer, a person is guilty of involuntary manslaughter when he or she intends an unlawful act that is likely to do harm to the person, and death results which was neither foreseen nor intended. The name for this crime is 'manslaughter by an unlawful and dangerous act' (MUDA). The term 'constructive manslaughter' is commonly and correctly used as a synonym. Although the accused did not intend to cause serious harm or foresee the risk of doing so, and although an objective observer would not necessarily have predicted that serious harm would result, the accused's responsibility for causing death is constructed from the fault in committing what might have been a minor criminal act.

The case of R v Goodfellow laid out a four-part requirement which if satisfied could lead to liability for MUDA. The person's action must:

1. Be intentional
2. Be unlawful
3. Lead the reasonable person to realise that some other person is at risk of physical harm
4. Be the cause of death

A number of authorities clarify the test from R v Goodfellow:

- As to (1): either did the person intend to bring about the commission of the offence, or was the outcome a virtual certainty that the person knew was a virtual certainty? If the answer to either of these questions is yes then the person's action was intentional.
- As to (2): a full 'base offence' must be established, or else there can be no liability for MUDA.
- As to (3): the test is one of objective reasonableness and is a question for the jury to determine (i.e. to answer the question: "Would a reasonable person realise that the defendant's act was bound to subject some other person to the risk of physical harm?")
- As to (4): was the act a cause in fact and in law? (see Causation (law) for details)

In R v Dawson, a petrol station attendant with a weak heart died of heart failure when the appellant attempted a robbery of the station. In judging whether this act was sufficiently dangerous, the Court of Appeal applied a test based on the "sober and reasonable" bystander who could be assumed to know that the use of a replica gun was likely to terrify people and so be a danger to those with a weak heart. Note the aggravated form of criminal damage with intent to endanger life under section 1(2) of the Criminal Damage Act 1971 which could provide the unlawful act if the damage actually causes death. But R v Carey, C and F limits the scope of unlawful act manslaughter. An argument became violent and the first defendant punched and kicked one victim. The second defendant assaulted the deceased by pulling her hair back and punching her in the face. The third defendant assaulted another.

The deceased was one of the first to run away, after which she felt faint, and later died of a heart condition (ventricular fibrillation or dysrhythmia) which was congenital but which had not been diagnosed before her death. The unlawful act was said to be the affray and the judge held that it was legitimate to aggregate the violence by the other defendants in order to decide whether the affray had subjected the deceased to the threat of at least some physical harm, and so had been a cause of death. On appeal, it was judged to be inappropriate to hold the defendants liable for the death. There must be an unlawful act that was dangerous in the sense that sober and reasonable persons would recognise that the act was such as to subject Y to the risk of physical harm. In turn, that act must cause the death. When deciding whether an act is dangerous, knowledge of the victim's characteristics may be relevant.

In this case, no reasonable person would have been aware of the victim's heart condition, which distinguishes this case from Dawson, and from R v Watson in which the victim's approximate age (he was 87 years old) and frail state would have been obvious to a reasonable person. A sober and reasonable person would not have foreseen that an apparently healthy person of 15 years would suffer shock as a result of it. The court held that the deceased's death was not caused by injuries that were a foreseeable result of the affray. The assault by the second defendant was an unlawful act causing death. The other two defendants could have been convicted by virtue of common purpose given that the death was an accidental departure from the general plan of the affray. But the Crown did not elect to present the case in this way, but pleaded the case as a public order group activity. The result would be that if anyone died in a general disturbance amounting to an affray, all those who participated could be convicted of manslaughter which would be against public policy. Deaths in a general disturbance are too remote to be caused by all participants.

Thus, a punch which causes a person to fall will almost inevitably satisfy the test of dangerousness, and where the victim falls and suffers a fatal head injury the accused is guilty of manslaughter. It is foreseeable that the victim is at risk of suffering some physical harm (albeit not serious harm) from such a punch and that is sufficient. Physical harm includes shock. The reason why the death resulting from the attempted robbery of the 60-year-old petrol station attendant was not manslaughter was that the attempted robbery was not dangerous in the relevant sense. It was not foreseeable that an apparently healthy 60-year-old man would suffer shock and a heart attack as a result of such an attempted robbery. But the jury properly found that it was foreseeable that an obviously frail and very old man was at risk of suffering shock leading to a heart attack as a result of a burglary committed at his home late at night.

In R v Charles James Brown, following the break-up of his relationship with his girlfriend, at about 3 pm, the defendant sent a text message to his mother saying that he did not want to live any more. He then drove his car against the flow of traffic along the hard shoulder of the A1(M) at high speed, before moving into the carriageway, still accelerating and straddling the centre line. He then crashed, head on, into an oncoming car, killing the passenger and injuring many others in the resulting consequential crashes. A sentence of 10 years' detention in a young offender institution was upheld because although the intentional focus might have been only on suicide, the defendant must have known from the way he was driving that he would kill or injure at least one other person (thus enforcing an objective standard on the defendant).

=== Unlawful (constructive) act manslaughter and the liability imposed on drug suppliers ===
The law on those who supply the (post) deceased with drugs had been uncertain until the case of R v Kennedy. The defendant supplied heroin to a drug user that asked for something to help them sleep. An hour after administering the drug the victim died. Kennedy was found guilty of manslaughter and appealed on the grounds that there must be an unlawful act which caused the victim's death. In this case the defendant set up the drug and supplied it but did not administer it, therefore it was an act of the victim himself that caused his own death. Kennedy was acquitted of manslaughter. Prior to this House of Lords ruling, the lower courts (in particular the Court of Appeal) struggled to strike a balance between those suppliers considered to have administered the drug (in the subsequent cases, heroin) to the victim themselves, and those suppliers who simply "supply" the drug for the victim to then voluntarily administer themselves.

== Defence ==
Infanticide is a partial defence to manslaughter under the Infanticide Act 1938 (as amended by section 57 the Coroners and Justice Act 2009 to confirm the decision in R v Gore) and reduces the manslaughter to the crime of infanticide.

== Mode of trial and sentence ==
Manslaughter is an indictable-only offence.

A person guilty of manslaughter is liable to imprisonment for life or for any shorter term.

For case law on sentencing see the Crown Prosecution Service sentencing manual:

- Involuntary manslaughter
- Manslaughter – diminished responsibility
- Manslaughter – provocation
- Manslaughter – suicide pact

The Sentencing Council set out a guideline for manslaughter (substituted for charge/finding of murder) by reason of an accepted defence of loss of control. It came in to effect on 1 November 2018.

- The recommended "offence range" is 3–20 years custody.
- The maximum is life imprisonment.
- This is a serious specified offence for the purposes of sections 224 and 225(2) (life sentences for serious offences) of the Criminal Justice Act 2003.
- This is an offence listed in Part 1 of Schedule 15B for the purposes of section 224A (life sentence for a second listed offence) and section 226A (extended sentence for certain violent, sexual or terrorism offences) of the Criminal Justice Act 2003.
- The type of manslaughter (and thereby the appropriate guideline) should have been identified prior to sentence.

A nine-stage formula is to be used, for ideal legal compliance. Stage 1, culpability, will set the sentencing "starting point".

Notably the fourth stage is reduction for guilty pleas (such as by a plea bargain); the fifth is dangerousness. If the actions and/or psychological reports are adverse they may well meet the criteria in Chapter 5 of Part 12 of the Criminal Justice Act 2003 by which it would be appropriate to impose a life sentence (section 224A or section 225) or an extended sentence (section 226A).

== Attempt ==
In R v Creamer, the court said obiter that attempted manslaughter is not an offence known to law.

== History ==
=== Voluntary manslaughter – former partial defence of provocation ===
Provocation in English law was abolished on 4 October 2010 by section 56(1) of the Coroners and Justice Act 2009, but replaced by the similar partial defence of "loss of control".

==== Acts constituting provocation ====
At common law, acts of provocation had to be actual violence towards the defendant; words could not amount to provocation. The two exceptions to this rule were a husband discovering his wife committing adultery and a father finding someone buggering his son. There were two limbs to the defence, first the defendant had to have actually been provoked, and second the provocation had to be such as would have made the reasonable man act as the defendant did. The Homicide Act 1957 removed all limits on what could amount to provocation and allowed it to include provocation from someone other than the victim, and aimed at someone other than the accused. Further the defence was not defeated by the fact that the defendant induced the provocation. Section 56 of the Coroners and Justice Act 2009 states that the common law defence of provocation is abolished and replaced by sections 54 and 55; and that section 3 of the Homicide Act 1957 is also abolished and replaced with sections 54 and 55.

==== Subjective limb: provocation in fact ====
This was a question of fact for the jury. The loss of control had to be sudden and temporary, however it could be the result of slow burn; the final straw needed not be very bad as long as it led to an actual sudden and temporary loss of control. A delay between the act of provocation and the killing did not always defeat the defence, but often would.

==== Objective limb: the reasonable man test ====
Under section 3 of the Homicide Act 1957 the second question to be answered by the jury in order for the defence to succeed was ‘whether the provocation was enough to make a reasonable man act as [the defendant] did?’. The reasonable man for the purposes of this test had the same sex and age as the defendant and shared such characteristics as affect the gravity of the provocation to the defendant, but characteristics irrelevant to the provocation such as unrelated mental disorders were not given to the reasonable man. Finally, the reasonable man always had reasonable powers of self-control and was never intoxicated.

== See also ==
- English criminal law
- Infanticide
- Suicide Act 1961
