= Breach of duty in English law =

Concept in English tort law

In English tort law, there can be no liability in negligence unless the claimant establishes both that they were owed a duty of care by the defendant, and that there has been a breach of that duty. The defendant is in breach of duty towards the claimant if their conduct fell short of the standard expected under the circumstances.

== General standard of care is as follows ==
For a defendant to be deemed negligent, he must have breached his duty of care towards the plaintiff. In order to be deemed as breaching the duty of care, his actions must be proven to fall below the standard of care likely to be taken by the reasonable man. Establishing a breach of duty and ascertaining the standard of care is complex and before establishing that the duty of care has been breached the plaintiff must first prove that the defendant owed him a duty of care.

The standard of care is defined as the measures that a reasonable person (in the circumstances of the defendant) take to reduce the risk of harm. This is an objective standard where the 'reasonable person' test is applied to determine if the defendant has breached their duty of care. In other words, it is the response of a reasonable person to a foreseeable risk. The standard of care naturally varies over time, and is affected by circumstantial factors. Thus, when a standard of care is established in one case, it will not automatically become a precedent for another - each case is judged on its own facts.

== Special standards ==
The standard of "the man on the Clapham omnibus" is not applied in all cases, since this might lead to unfairness. There are defendants for whom this standard is much too low and would exonerate an obvious wrongdoing. In other cases, the standard may be seen as too demanding of the defendant in the circumstances. The most common examples are the cases of specialist defendants, inexperienced defendants and child defendants.

=== Skilled defendants (specialists) ===
The test of an ordinary average person would not be appropriate for defendants that profess or hold themselves out as professing a certain skill. The "man on the Clapham omnibus" does not have that skill and the conduct expected from a skilled professional is not the same as could be expected of an ordinary man in the same circumstances. The general standard applied to professionals is therefore that of a "reasonable professional", e.g. car mechanic, doctor etc.

Breach of the duty owed, Sabol v. Richmond Heights General Hospital (1996)

The court stated that the nurses’ actions were consistent with basic professional standards of practice for medical-surgical nurses in an acute care hospital. They did not have nor were they expected to have specialized psychiatric nursing training and would not be judged as though they did.

=== Novices (imperitia culpae adnumerator) ===
Novices in a certain area of skill must show the same standard of care as a reasonable person with that particular skill. No allowance is given for the defendant's lack of experience.

- Nettleship v Weston (1971) 3 All ER 581 requires a novice driver to show the same standard of care as a reasonably competent driver.
- Wilsher v Essex Area Health Authority (1986) 3 All ER 801 expects a junior doctor to perform compliant to the standard of a competent and skilled doctor working in the same post.
- Wells v Cooper (1958) 2 All ER 527 states that someone who does DIY jobs repairing their own house is expected to show the same standard of care as a reasonably skilled amateur in the particular trade involved. However, they are not required to reach the standard of a professional.

The claimant's knowledge of the defendant's lack of experience in the skill he is exercising does not result in the standard being lowered. In Nettleship v Weston, a driving instructor was injured due to a mistake of his student. The student argued that the instructor was aware of her lack of experience, but the Court of Appeal refused to accommodate this fact in their decision on the standard of care expected from her. At the same time, the teacher's award of damages was reduced due to his contributory negligence.

=== Children ===
While no allowance is made for novices, the courts are prepared to lower the standard of care expected of children, on account of their age. A child defendant is expected to meet the standard of a reasonable child of the same age.

- Gough v Thorne (1966) 3 All ER 398: a 13½ year old girl was not contributorily negligent when she crossed the road without looking after being beckoned by a lorry driver and was hit by a car driving at excessive speed.
- Mullin v Richards [1998] 1 All ER 920: a fifteen-year-old girl was not negligent when she was play fighting with a friend and a ruler she was fencing with shattered, a splinter flying into the other girl's eye.
- OLL Ltd v Secretary of State for Transport [1997] 3 All E.R. 897: with particular regard to the duty of care owed by the emergency services.

== Conduct expected of a reasonable person ==
In the usual case, having established that there is a duty of care, the claimant must prove that the defendant failed to do what the reasonable person ("reasonable professional", "reasonable child") would have done in the same situation. If the defendant fails to come up to the standard, this will be a breach of the duty of care. This is judged by reference to the following factors:

- What did the defendant know? According to Denning LJ in Roe v Minister of Health (1954) 2 AER 131, the defendant will only be liable if the reasonable person would have foreseen the loss or damage in the circumstances prevailing at the time of the alleged breach of duty.
- What was the degree of risk? The greater the risk that serious harm can be inflicted, the greater the precautions that the defendant will be required to take. In Bolton v Stone[1951] AC 850, [1951] 1 All ER 1078, a cricket club was not negligent when a ball was hit out of the ground and injured the plaintiff, because the likelihood of this occurring was so small that the defendant could not be expected to have taken precautions. In Miller v Jackson ([1977] QB 966, [1977] 3 WLR 20, [1977] 3 All ER 338 however, the ball was hit out of the ground several times every season. In these circumstances, the club was expected to take precautions.
- How practical were these precautions? In Wilson v Governor of Sacred Heart Roman Catholic Primary School (1997) EWCA Civ 2644 it was held that a primary school was not negligent in not employing someone to supervise the playground after the close of school hours and until all the children had left. In Haley v London Electricity Board [1964] 3 All ER 185, a blind man fell into a hole in the ground that was indicated by a visual sign. He became deaf as a result. It was held that it was foreseeable that a blind man would be walking on the street and the risk of him injuring himself justified the precautions of putting up a barrier. The test is a balance of reasonableness of precautions against the likelihood of injury being sustained.
- What is the social importance of the defendant's activity? If the defendant's actions serve a socially useful purpose then they may have been justified in taking greater risks. Thus, in Watt v Hertfordshire CC (1954) 2 AER 368, the fire brigade was not negligent in getting the wrong vehicle to the scene of an accident because valuable time would have been lost in getting the best vehicle there to help. Since 26 July 2006, this consideration has had a statutory basis under section 1 of the Compensation Act 2006.
- Common practice. A defendant complying with a common practice in his area of activity will usually be considered to have met the standard of a reasonable man, unless the court judges the practice itself to be negligent. In Paris v Stepney Borough Council (1951) 1 AER 42 although there was a practice of not providing employees with safety goggles, the Council owed a special duty to protect the claimant because he had already lost the sight of one eye.

=== Sporting events ===
The conduct expected from a participant in a sports event towards his competitors or spectators differs from the conduct of a reasonable person outside such events. It has been held that in the "heat and flurry" of a competition, a participant will only be in breach of duty towards other participants and spectators if he shows "reckless disregard for their safety". At the same time, in another case, the standard of care expected from one player towards another is the usual standard of taking "all reasonable care in the circumstances in which they were placed", although in that case the defendant was also found to be acting recklessly. It is not clear at present if and how the two approaches can be reconciled.

== Burden of proof ==
Whether or not the defendant in a given case has conducted himself below the standard of "a reasonable person" is a question of fact and it is for the claimant to prove this fact. However, in certain situations it is unlikely that a certain event could take place without the defendant's negligence, for example if a surgeon left a scalpel in the patient's body. In such cases, it is said that "the thing speaks for itself" (res ipsa loquitur), and it is for the defendant to show that the fact causing the damage was not attributable to his negligence.

The claimant may raise res ipsa loquitur to shift the evidential burden to the defendant. To do so, following criteria must be satisfied:

1. The incident occurred in an unexplainable fashion;
2. The incident would not have occurred in the ordinary course of events if not defendant's negligence; and
3. The defendant or defendants had control of the injury causing object.

== See also ==
- Damages
- Bolam Test
