= Fairchild v Glenhaven Funeral Services Ltd =

2002 English tort law case

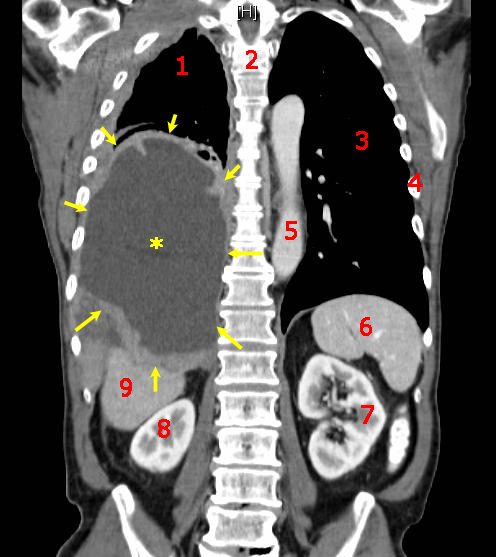
- Court: House of Lords
- Full case name: Fairchild v Glenhaven Funeral Services Ltd (t/a GH Dovener & Son); Pendleton v Stone & Webster Engineering Ltd; Dyson v Leeds City Council (No.2); Matthews v Associated Portland Cement Manufacturers (1978) Ltd; Fox v Spousal (Midlands) Ltd; Babcock International Ltd v National Grid Co Plc; Matthews v British Uralite Plc
- Decided: 20 June 2002
- Citations: [2002] UKHL 22, [2003] 1 AC 32, [2002] 3 WLR 89, [2002] 3 All ER 305, [2002] ICR 798, [2002] IRLR 533

Court membership
- Judges sitting: Lord Bingham of Cornhill; Lord Nicholls of Birkenhead; Lord Hoffmann; Lord Hutton; Lord Rodger of Earlsferry

Keywords
- Causation, employer liability, material increase in risk

Fairchild v Glenhaven Funeral Services Ltd [2002] UKHL 22 is a leading case on causation in English tort law. It concerned malignant mesothelioma, a deadly disease caused by breathing asbestos fibres. The House of Lords approved the test of "materially increasing risk" of harm, as a deviation in some circumstances from the ordinary "balance of probabilities" test under the "but for" standard.

== Facts ==
Mr Fairchild had worked for a number of different employers, as a subcontractor for Leeds City Council, all of whom had negligently exposed him to asbestos. Mr Fairchild contracted pleural mesothelioma. He died, and his wife was suing the employers on his behalf for negligence. A number of other claimants were in similar situations, and joined in on the appeal. The problem was, a single asbestos fibre, inhaled at any time, can trigger mesothelioma. The risk of contracting an asbestos related disease increases depending on the amount of exposure to it. However, because of long latency periods (it takes 25 to 50 years before symptoms of disease become evident) it is impossible to know when the crucial moment was. It was impossible therefore for Mr Fairchild to identify a singular employer at fault. Moreover, because the traditional test of causation is to show that "on the balance of probabilities" X has caused Y harm, it was impossible to say that any single employer was the cause at all. While it was possible to say "it was one of them" it was impossible to say which. Under the normal causation test, none of them would be found, on the balance of probabilities to have caused the harm.

== Judgment ==
The House of Lords held that, following McGhee v National Coal Board the appropriate test in this situation was whether the defendant had materially increased the risk of harm toward the plaintiff. The employers were joint and severally liable against the plaintiff (though amongst themselves they could sue one another for different contributions). It was wrong to deny the claimants any remedy at all. Therefore, the appropriate test of causation is whether the employers had materially increased the risk of harm to the claimants.

Lord Bingham gave the leading judgment.

2. The essential question underlying the appeals may be accurately expressed in this way. If

(1) C was employed at different times and for differing periods by both A and B, and
(2) A and B were both subject to a duty to take reasonable care or to take all practicable measures to prevent C inhaling asbestos dust because of the known risk that asbestos dust (if inhaled) might cause a mesothelioma, and
(3) both A and B were in breach of that duty in relation to C during the periods of C's employment by each of them with the result that during both periods C inhaled excessive quantities of asbestos dust, and
(4) C is found to be suffering from a mesothelioma, and
(5) any cause of C's mesothelioma other than the inhalation of asbestos dust at work can be effectively discounted, but
(6) C cannot (because of the current limits of human science) prove, on the balance of probabilities, that his mesothelioma was the result of his inhaling asbestos dust during his employment by A or during his employment by B or during his employment by A and B taken together,

is C entitled to recover damages against either A or B or against both A and B?

...

7. ... There is no way of identifying, even on a balance of probabilities, the source of the fibre or fibres which initiated the genetic process which culminated in the malignant tumour. It is on this rock of uncertainty, reflecting the point to which medical science has so far advanced, that the three claims were rejected by the Court of Appeal and by two of the three trial judges.

Principle

8. In a personal injury action based on negligence or breach of statutory duty the claimant seeks to establish a breach by the defendant of a duty owed to the claimant, which has caused him damage. For the purposes of analysis, and for the purpose of pleading, proving and resolving the claim, lawyers find it convenient to break the claim into its constituent elements: the duty, the breach, the damage and the causal connection between the breach and the damage. In the generality of personal injury actions, it is of course true that the claimant is required to discharge the burden of showing that the breach of which he complains caused the damage for which he claims and to do so by showing that but for the breach he would not have suffered the damage.

9. The issue in these appeals does not concern the general validity and applicability of that requirement, which is not in question, but is whether in special circumstances such as those in these cases there should be any variation or relaxation of it. The overall object of tort law is to define cases in which the law may justly hold one party liable to compensate another. Are these such cases? A and B owed C a duty to protect C against a risk of a particular and very serious kind. They failed to perform that duty. As a result the risk eventuated and C suffered the very harm against which it was the duty of A and B to protect him. Had there been only one tortfeasor, C would have been entitled to recover, but because the duty owed to him was broken by two tortfeasors and not only one, he is held to be entitled to recover against neither, because of his inability to prove what is scientifically unprovable. If the mechanical application of generally accepted rules leads to such a result, there must be room to question the appropriateness of such an approach in such a case.

...

34. To the question posed in paragraph 2 of this opinion I would answer that where conditions (1)-(6) are satisfied C is entitled to recover against both A and B. That conclusion is in my opinion consistent with principle, and also with authority (properly understood). Where those conditions are satisfied, it seems to me just and in accordance with common sense to treat the conduct of A and B in exposing C to a risk to which he should not have been exposed as making a material contribution to the contracting by C of a condition against which it was the duty of A and B to protect him. I consider that this conclusion is fortified by the wider jurisprudence reviewed above. Policy considerations weigh in favour of such a conclusion. It is a conclusion which follows even if either A or B is not before the court. It was not suggested in argument that C's entitlement against either A or B should be for any sum less than the full compensation to which C is entitled, although A and B could of course seek contribution against each other or any other employer liable in respect of the same damage in the ordinary way. No argument on apportionment was addressed to the House. I would in conclusion emphasise that my opinion is directed to cases in which each of the conditions specified in (1) - (6) of paragraph 2 above is satisfied and to no other case. It would be unrealistic to suppose that the principle here affirmed will not over time be the subject of incremental and analogical development. Cases seeking to develop the principle must be decided when and as they arise. For the present, I think it unwise to decide more than is necessary to resolve these three appeals which, for all the foregoing reasons, I concluded should be allowed.

Lord Hoffmann said the following:

60. The problem in this appeal is to formulate a just and fair rule. Clearly the rule must be based upon principle. However deserving the claimants may be, your Lordships are not exercising a discretion to adapt causal requirements to the individual case. That does not mean, however, that it must be a principle so broad that it takes no account of significant differences which affect whether it is fair and just to impose liability.

61. What are the significant features of the present case? First, we are dealing with a duty specifically intended to protect employees against being unnecessarily exposed to the risk of (among other things) a particular disease. Secondly, the duty is one intended to create a civil right to compensation for injury relevantly connected with its breach. Thirdly, it is established that the greater the exposure to asbestos, the greater the risk of contracting that disease. Fourthly, except in the case in which there has been only one significant exposure to asbestos, medical science cannot prove whose asbestos is more likely than not to have produced the cell mutation which caused the disease. Fifthly, the employee has contracted the disease against which he should have been protected.

62. In these circumstances, a rule requiring proof of a link between the defendant's asbestos and the claimant's disease would, with the arbitrary exception of single-employer cases, empty the duty of content. If liability depends upon proof that the conduct of the defendant was a necessary condition of the injury, it cannot effectively exist. It is however open to your Lordships to formulate a different causal requirement in this class of case. The Court of Appeal was in my opinion wrong to say that in the absence of a proven link between the defendant's asbestos and the disease, there was no "causative relationship" whatever between the defendant's conduct and the disease. It depends entirely upon the level at which the causal relationship is described. To say, for example, that the cause of Mr Matthews' cancer was his significant exposure to asbestos during two employments over a period of eight years, without being able to identify the day upon which he inhaled the fatal fibre, is a meaningful causal statement. The medical evidence shows that it is the only kind of causal statement about the disease which, in the present state of knowledge, a scientist would regard as possible. There is no a priori reason, no rule of logic, which prevents the law from treating it as sufficient to satisfy the causal requirements of the law of negligence. The question is whether your Lordships think such a rule would be just and reasonable and whether the class of cases to which it applies can be sufficiently clearly defined.

63. So the question of principle is this: in cases which exhibit the five features I have mentioned, which rule would be more in accordance with justice and the policy of common law and statute to protect employees against the risk of contracting asbestos-related diseases? One which makes an employer in breach of his duty liable for the claimant's injury because he created a significant risk to his health, despite the fact that the physical cause of the injury may have been created by someone else? Or a rule which means that unless he was subjected to risk by the breach of duty of a single employer, the employee can never have a remedy? My Lords, as between the employer in breach of duty and the employee who has lost his life in consequence of a period of exposure to risk to which that employer has contributed, I think it would be both inconsistent with the policy of the law imposing the duty and morally wrong for your Lordships to impose causal requirements which exclude liability.

...

67. I therefore regard McGhee as a powerful support for saying that when the five factors I have mentioned are present, the law should treat a material increase in risk as sufficient to satisfy the causal requirements for liability. The only difficulty lies in the way McGhee was explained in Wilsher v Essex Area Health Authority [1988] AC 1074. The latter was not a case in which the five factors were present. It was an action for clinical negligence in which it was alleged that giving a premature baby excessive oxygen had caused retrolental fibroplasia, resulting in blindness. The evidence was that the fibroplasia could have been caused in a number of different ways including excessive oxygen but the judge had made no finding that the oxygen was more likely than not to have been the cause. The Court of Appeal [1987] QB 730 held that the health authority was nevertheless liable because even if the excessive oxygen could not be shown to have caused the injury, it materially increased the risk of the injury happening.

== Significance ==
The cost of this ruling was enormous. It is estimated that this single judgment was worth £6.8bn. Approximately 13 Britons die every day from asbestos related diseases, and the rate of deaths are increasing.

In this context, another asbestos related case came before the House of Lords in Barker v Corus [2006] UKHL 20. This time the question was whether, if one of the employers that was responsible for the materially increasing the risk of harm had gone insolvent, should the solvent employers pick up the proportion for which that insolvent employer was responsible? The House of Lords accepted the argument that the solvent employer should not. So for example, Mr B has worked for employers X, Y, and Z for ten years each. X, Y and Z have all exposed Mr B to asbestos, and it is not possible to say with which employer Mr B had contracted a disease. But now X and Y have gone insolvent, and Mr B is suing Z. The House of Lords held that Z would only have to pay one third of the full compensation for Mr B's disease, in other words, Z has only "proportionate liability" for that part which he materially increased the risk of Mr B's harm. This outcome was advocated by a number of academics.

The essential decision to be made is whether a tortfeasor or a claimant should bear the risk of other tortfeasors going insolvent. It is important to keep in mind, that in the example above, Z may not have actually caused any harm. Moreover, it might have been that Z in fact caused all the harm. After the decision in Barker there was a swift and fierce political backlash, with large numbers of workers, families, trade unions, and Members of Parliament calling for the reversal of the ruling. This was on the basis that it would undermine full compensation for working people and their families. Soon enough the Compensation Act 2006 was introduced, specifically to reverse the ruling. However the Act only applies to mesothelioma. What remains to be seen is whether the "proportionate liability" idea will crop up in other situations.

=== The Fairchild Exception ===
The Fairchild (material increase in risk) exception to the ordinary rules of causation (balance of probabilities) was implemented into Section 3 of the Compensation Act 2006. This allows employees to recover damages when the conditions for applying the exception are met, these are laid out in Section 3(1)(a)-(d) of the Act:

3 Mesothelioma: damages

(1)This section applies where—

(a)a person (“the responsible person”) has negligently or in breach of statutory duty caused or permitted another person (“the victim”) to be exposed to asbestos,

(b)the victim has contracted mesothelioma as a result of exposure to asbestos,

(c)because of the nature of mesothelioma and the state of medical science, it is not possible to determine with certainty whether it was the exposure mentioned in paragraph (a) or another exposure which caused the victim to become ill, and

(d)the responsible person is liable in tort, by virtue of the exposure mentioned in paragraph (a), in connection with damage caused to the victim by the disease (whether by reason of having materially increased a risk or for any other reason).

- Contains parliamentary information licensed under the open Government Licence v3.0

— https://www.legislation.gov.uk/ukpga/2006/29/section/3

=== Cases Mentioned ===
- Barker v. Corus
- Asbestos and the law
- Negligence
- English tort law
- Causation
- McGhee v National Coal Board
- Bailey v Ministry of Defence
