= Blyth v Birmingham Waterworks Co =

UK legal case

Blyth v Birmingham Waterworks Company
- Court: Exchequer Court
- Decided: 6 February 1856
- Citation: (1856) 11 Ex Ch 781, 156 ER 1047
- Transcript: Full text of judgment

Keywords
- Negligence, nuisance, reasonable foreseeability

Blyth v Birmingham Waterworks Company (1856) 11 Ex Ch 781 concerns reasonableness in the law of negligence. It is famous for its classic statement of what negligence is and the standard of care to be met.

== Facts ==
The defendants, Birmingham Waterworks Company, were the water works for Birmingham. They had been incorporated by the Birmingham Water Act 1826 (7 Geo. 4. c. cix) for the purpose of supplying Birmingham with water. The statute provided that:

the company should, upon the laying down of any main-pipe or other pipe in any street, fix, at the time of laying down such pipe, a proper and sufficient fire-plug in each such street, and should deliver the key or keys of such fire-plug to the persons having the care of the engine-house in or near to the said street, and cause another key to be hung up in the watch-house in or near to the said street. By sect. 87, pipes were to be eighteen inches beneath the surface of the soil. By the 89th section, the mains were at all times to be kept charged with water. The defendants derived no profit from the maintenance of the plugs distinct from the general profits of the whole business, but such maintenance was one of the conditions under which they were permitted to exercise the privileges given by the Act. The main-pipe opposite the house of the plaintiff was more than eighteen inches below the surface. The fire-plug was constructed according to the best known system, and the materials of it were at the time of the accident sound and in good order.

The defendant had installed a fireplug into the hydrant near Mr Blyth's house. That winter, during a severe frost, the plug failed causing a flood and damage to Mr Blyth's house. Blyth sued the Waterworks for negligence.

== Judgment ==
In establishing the basis of the case, Baron Alderson, made what has become a famous definition of negligence:

Negligence is the omission to do something which a reasonable man, guided upon those considerations which ordinarily regulate the conduct of human affairs, would do, or doing something which a prudent and reasonable man would not do. The defendants might have been liable for negligence, if, unintentionally, they omitted to do that which a reasonable person would have done, or did that which a person taking reasonable precautions would not have done.

The court found that the severe frost could not have been in the contemplation of the water works. They could only have been negligent if they had failed to do what a reasonable person would do in the circumstances. Birmingham had not seen such cold in such a long time, and it would be unreasonable for the water works to anticipate such a rare occurrence.

B. Martin offered a concurring opinion, stating that "hold otherwise would be to make the company responsible as insurers."

B. Bramwell delivered a dissenting judgment on the law, but reached the same result on the facts.
