= Loss of chance in English law =

Legal concept

In English law, loss of chance refers to a particular problem of causation, which arises in tort and contract. The law is invited to assess hypothetical outcomes, either affecting the claimant or a third party, where the defendant's breach of contract or of the duty of care for the purposes of negligence deprived the claimant of the opportunity to obtain a benefit and/or avoid a loss. For these purposes, the remedy of damages is normally intended to compensate for the claimant's loss of expectation (alternative rationales include restitution and reliance). The general rule is that while a loss of chance is compensable when the chance was something promised on a contract it is not generally so in the law of tort, where most cases thus far have been concerned with medical negligence in the public health system.

== Contract ==
=== Remedies ===
In contract cases, the court is usually interested in securing the performance of what was agreed. Where one party is about to or has suffered loss as a result of the other's breach, the court offers practical protection to his or her expectations as to performance (in some cases, the use of injunction or specific performance may be appropriate). Where a party proves that he or she has sustained loss flowing from any breach (potentially including non-pecuniary or intangible losses, e.g. for disappointment, damage to reputation, etc.), the purpose of damages is, so far as money can do it, to place the claimant in the same situation as if the contract had been performed. Thus, the most relevant basis upon which to calculate any loss is to examine the economic potential of the contract as worded. This will provide a measure of what the claimant expected to gain, and so quantify what has been lost by the breach.

Where the court has knowledge of what actually happened subsequent to the breach, the Bwllfa principle, arising from the 1903 case of Bwllfa and Merthyr Dare Steam Collieries (1891) Ltd v. Pontypridd Waterworks Co., dictates that the assessment of damages should take account of what actually happened rather than just the economic potential anticipated at the time when the contract was agreed. Lord Macnaghten asked in his ruling on this case:

Why should [an arbitrator] listen to conjecture on a matter which has become an accomplished fact? Why should he guess when he can calculate? With the light before him why should he shut his eyes and grope in the dark?

=== Public policy ===
As a matter of public policy, the law aims to respect the reasonable expectations of all parties involved in the dispute. The fundamental approach is therefore to uphold the validity of the contract wherever possible. Thus, there is no general protection offered to those who find they have entered into a bad bargain. All must accept the real outcomes of agreements entered into voluntarily (see freedom of contract). Even when there is a breach, the court will not penalise the "guilty" party (see Addis v Gramophone Co Ltd [1909] AC 488 which prevents the award of punitive or exemplary damages in a purely contractual action), nor will it strip away all profits made at the expense of the other unless the breach is exceptional as in Attorney General v Blake [2000] 3 WLR 635 which appears to create a wholly novel form of contractual remedy, namely the restitutionary remedy of an account of profits for breach of contract where the normal remedies are inadequate. The standard remedy is damages which are usually calculated by reference to the claimant only and do not reflect any form of penalty on the other(s) for exploiting the gullibility or innocence of the claimant. The law also recognises that unfairness may flow from inequality in bargaining power and addresses oppressive exemption clauses.

=== Causation ===
The primary difficulty in the calculation of damages is the question of causation. Remoteness will defeat a claim if it depends on very hypothetical possibilities. In McRae v Commonwealth Disposals Commission relying on rumours, the Commission sold to McRae the right to salvage an oil tanker thought to be marooned at the specified location. Unfortunately, the tanker did not exist. The Commission argued the contract was void because of a common mistake as to the existence of the subject matter, but the court noted that the Commission "took no steps to verify what they were asserting and any 'mistake' that existed was induced by their own culpable conduct." McRae wasted money searching for the non-existent wreck. His claim for the loss of profits expected from a successful salvage was dismissed as too speculative, but reliance damages were awarded for wasted expenses. Nevertheless, the courts have been prepared to speculate. In Chaplin v Hicks (1911) 2 KB 786 the defendant in breach of contract prevented the claimant from taking part in the final stage of a beauty contest where twelve of the final fifty (out of 6,000 original entrants) would be rewarded with places in a chorus line. The claimant was awarded damages for the loss of a chance, assessed at 25% of winning the competition. The court seemed to proceed on the claimant's statistical chance of winning (as if she were a lottery player) without any actual assessment of her physical attributes against any particular criteria of beauty.

Yet Allied Maples Group Ltd v. Simmons & Simmons [1995] 1 WLR 1602 has partly restricted Chaplin v. Hicks. A solicitor's negligence deprived the claimant of an opportunity to negotiate a better bargain. The Court of Appeal held that if the client could show on the balance of probabilities that: (a) they would have sought renegotiation with the third party, and (b) that they had a substantial chance of negotiating (not necessarily that they would on balance of probabilities have negotiated) a better deal from the third party, then the court should quantify and award compensation for their loss of chance of doing so. Stuart-Smith LJ, at p1611, accepted the 'loss of chance' approach and regarded the case as one of those where "the plaintiff's loss depends on the hypothetical action of a third party, either in addition to action by the plaintiff … or independently of it." This inclusion of a third party in the equation to quantify loss could have been taken as a general precondition to all claim of loss cases, but Lord Nicholls in Gregg v Scott [2005] UKHL 2 said, "It is clear that Stuart-Smith LJ. did not intend this to be a precise or exhaustive statement of the circumstances where loss of a chance may constitute actionable damage and his observation has not been so understood."

In Bank of Credit and Commerce International SA v Ali [2002] 1 AC 251 an employee made redundant by BCCI, claimed the usual statutory payments and, under the aegis of ACAS, signed an agreement to accept a sum "in full and final settlement of all or any claims of whatsoever nature that exist or may exist against BCCI." The House of Lords held that this exclusion clause did not prevent employees from reopening their agreements when, following BCCI's collapse, it became clear that a significant part of the bank's business had been run dishonestly and the employees found that they were stigmatised for having worked there. When the parties signed the release, they could not have realistically supposed that a claim for damages in respect of disadvantage and stigma was a possibility. Accordingly, they claimed they could not have intended the release to apply to such a claim. But in earlier proceedings on the question of damages, the formidable practical obstacles presented by the limiting principles of causation, remoteness, and the duty of the claimant to mitigate any losses proved insurmountable. In 1999 Lightman J. tried five representative cases out of the 369 which had been initiated by former BCCI employees. None of them succeeded in proving that their unemployment was attributable to stigma. Indeed, subject to the anti-discrimination laws, a prospective employer is under no particular duty to employ anyone who attends for interview. Four of the cases tried by Lightman J. appear to have concerned employees who were dismissed by the liquidators when the bank collapsed in 1991. Those made redundant in 1990 faced the additional hurdle of having to explain why their unemployment was attributable to stigma when they were unable to find jobs for a year before any stigma attached to them.

In this context, Johnson (A.P.) v. Unisys Limited [2001] UKHL 13 rejects any interpretation of Addis v Gramophone Co Ltd that might have prevented an action for damage to reputation or for psychiatric injury arising from dismissal, but confirms formidable evidential difficulties on causation: How, for example, would the employee prove that his psychiatric condition was caused by the manner of the dismissal rather than the fact of the dismissal which is within an employer's power for cause? More generally, the case holds that claims for breach of contractual terms cannot be used to avoid statutory preconditions to making claims for unfair dismissal. Recently, in Harper v. Virgin Net [2004] EWCA Civ 271 the Court of Appeal decided that an employee who was summarily dismissed, cannot bring a claim for damages for the loss of the opportunity to initiate a claim for unfair dismissal. If she had served the minimum three-month period of notice stipulated in the contract, she would have been able to bring a claim for unfair dismissal. But although there was a breach of this term as to notice, there was no loss of chance to claim. She had not gained the chance by actually serving the minimum statutory period of twelve months to qualify and the action for breach of a contractual term could not be used to defeat Parliament's intention in specifying a minimum period of actual service.

== Negligence ==
While the award of damages in tort may protect pre-existing expectations (e.g. of earning capacity or of business profits), a claimant cannot be seen to benefit from the breach of the duty of care. The measure of damages is therefore to ensure that the claimant is "no worse off" having suffered the breach of the duty of care. In each case, the claimant must prove the cause of action on the balance of probabilities. For these purposes, the court is required to speculate on what would have happened had there been no negligence. In many cases, loss and damage might have been sustained even if all had gone as planned. But there might always have been a chance that no long-term loss and damage would occur. For example, a person may attend a hospital with an existing injury. The only effect of any negligence in the treatment may be that the patient loses the chance of a full recovery, i.e. what was merely threatened becomes inevitable. Thus, actions by claimants whose chances of recovery from illness or injury have been reduced due to the professional negligence of their doctors have failed when they could not establish that, with proper treatment, their chances of recovery would have exceeded 50%. In Gregg v Scott [2005] UKHL 2; [2005] 2 WLR 268 a man whose chances of surviving non-Hodgkin's Lymphoma for ten years were reduced from 42% to 25% by a delay in diagnosis could not claim damages because his chances were already too slim (below 50%) for the delay to have worsened his position. This was complicated by the fact that the case was brought before the court following an extended delay at which point the plaintiff was still alive. In the judgement this was cited as a significant weakness in his claim. The principle is that a claimant must have had a more than 50% chance of survival to establish causation in order to satisfy the balance of probability test. However, in some Australian states, claims for loss of chance have been succeeded in medical negligence cases. Their approach argues that a patient would rather have a 42% than a 25% chance of survival. If negligence reduces the percentage, common sense justice rejects a black-and-white approach to accepting or rejecting a claim based on an expert's opinion as to whether there was ever a 50% chance of survival, and prefers to offer mitigated damages to represent the loss of chance.

In cases of economic loss, the rule that a claimant cannot normally recover for a lost chance is modified. In Kitchen v. Royal Air Force Association [1958] 2 All ER 241 a solicitor failed to issue a writ within the period of limitation in respect of a fatal accident. The surviving spouse sued for damages as she was unable to pursue her claim. There was no doubt that the loss was caused by the solicitors’ negligence and the only argument related to quantification of her claim. Although it was argued on behalf of the solicitors that the claimant might not have won her case, and may therefore have lost nothing, the court held that she had lost a chance and, as this was a valuable right, she should be compensated for it. Similarly, in Stovold v. Barlows (1996) PNLR 91 a solicitor acting for a vendor failed to use the appropriate system for sending the title deeds to a purchaser. Consequently, the claimant lost his chance to sell the property at a higher price. But damages were reduced by 50% as the court held that the purchaser might have bought another property even if the documents had arrived on time. In First Interstate Bank of California v Cohen Arnold & Co. (1996) PNLR 17 the claimant bank had loaned money to a client of the defendant accountants who negligently overstated the net worth of their clients. The bank then became concerned about the amount of the loan outstanding but, relying on the representations made by the defendant accountants, the bank delayed in calling in the loan. As a result of the delay in placing the property on the market, the price obtained was £1.45 million whereas the bank contended that it could have realised £3 million in an earlier sale. The Court of Appeal valued the chance at 66.66% on the assumption that “but for” the negligence, the property would actually have been sold for 66.66% of £3 million.

In commercial cases, damages are assessed not on the outcome which the claimant would have sought, but on the economic opportunity which he has lost. The claimant must prove on the balance of probabilities that he or she would have taken action to obtain the relevant benefit or avoid the relevant risk. Once this has been established, the claimant need only show that the chance which he or she has lost was real or substantial. In Coudert Brothers v. Normans Bay Ltd. (formerly Illingworth, Morris Ltd.) [2004] EWCA Civ 215 the court reviewed two earlier authorities:Allied Maples Group Ltd v Simmons & Simmons and Equitable Life Assurance Society v Ernst & Young (2003) EWCA Civ 1114. The claimant, Normans Bay Ltd. was advised by Coudert Brothers in a tender for 49% of the shares in a Russian company, Bolshevichka, in 1993, but the investment was lost. NBL claimed that, "but for" Coudert's negligence, the tender would have survived. At first instance, Buckley J assessed that chance of survival at 70%. The prior cases establish that loss of chance claims require proof on the balance of probabilities that:

1. the claimant would have sought to secure the advantage which is the subject matter of the claim for valuation.
2. where the claim depends on the hypothetical acts of a third party, e.g. whether the panel of a beauty contest would have awarded a prize to the claimant, the claimant has lost a real or substantial chance as opposed to a speculative or fanciful chance.

If both of these are proved, the court must assess that chance lost. If the chance was low, the court will award a low percentage of the value of the chance in damages; if the chance had a high probability of success, a high percentage will be awarded. On appeal the award was reduced to 40%. The court also dismissed Coudert's argument that its own negligence had broken the chain of causation because, to allow such an argument, would be to allow a party to benefit from their own unlawful act.

== In other jurisdictions ==
The loss of chance doctrine has received mixed reception elsewhere.

In the United States, 24 states have adopted some version of the lost chance doctrine, 17 have rejected it, 4 have deferred ruling on the doctrine, and 5 have yet to address the matter. Common criticisms from U.S. state courts rejecting the lost chance doctrine are that it represents a relaxation of the normal burden of proof, and a drastic shift in tort liability that would be best left up to state legislatures. The Supreme Court of Texas has further noted the risk of creating a slippery slope—if lost chance can be applied in the medical malpractice context, why should it not apply to a legal malpractice plaintiff's claim of a lost chance of victory at trial due to poor lawyering, or perhaps an entrepreneur's lost chance of success for a new failed business due to the actions of another? In rejecting the doctrine, the Supreme Court of Texas concluded: “We see nothing unique about the healing arts which should make its practitioners more responsible for possible but not probable consequences than any other negligent actor.”

In Canada, the Supreme Court in Resler v. Anglin (2026) noted that "the availability of loss of chance damages in tort law remains unsettled in Canadian jurisprudence and raises significant unresolved questions of causation", adding that it had been more accepted in breach of contract cases and less accepted "torts where harm is not purely economic", such as medical malpractice cases. In the case at issue, an elections case, which had no direct precedent, it was sent back to the lower court to developer a fuller record.

== See also ==
- Damages
- Expectation damages
