= Bonnington Castings Ltd v Wardlaw =

- Court: House of Lords
- Citation: [1956] AC 613

Bonnington Castings Ltd v Wardlaw [1956] AC 613 is an English tort law case, concerning causation, and material contribution to harm.

== Facts ==
Mr Wardlaw worked in Bonnington's workshop for eight years where there was both a pneumatic hammer and swing grinders creating silicone dust that he inhaled. He then got pneumoconiosis. Bonnington held to be not liable for the harm caused by the hammer dust because, at the time, there was no way to prevent it. But, the court determined, Bonnington could prevent the dust from swing grinders by putting in an extraction fan.

On appeal, the question became how to separate the damage caused by the dust resulting from the pneumatic hammer (for which no breach of duty had been found) from the dust resulting from the swing grinder dust.

== Judgment ==
The House of Lords held that Bonnington had to compensate Mr Wardlaw for materially contributing to his injury. Lord Reid held that a statutory duty does not change the standard of proof from the balance of probabilities. De minimus non curat lex is the principle that small contributions are not actionable, but anything above is a ‘material contribution’. Dust from the grinders ‘made a substantial contribution’ even though more dust came from the hammers.

== See also ==
- English tort law
