= Wilsher v Essex Area HA =

1988 English tort law case on causation and material increase of risk

Wilsher v Essex Area Health Authority
- Citations: [1987] UKHL 11, [1988] AC 1074

Court membership
- Judges sitting: Lord Bridge of Harwich, Lord Fraser of Tullybelton, Lord Lowry, Lord Griffiths, Lord Ackner

Wilsher v Essex Area Health Authority [1987] UKHL 11 is an English tort law case concerning the "material increase of risk" test for causation.

== Facts ==
The defendant hospital, initially acting through an inexperienced junior doctor, negligently administered excessive oxygen during the post-natal care of a premature child who subsequently became blind. Excessive oxygen was, according to the medical evidence, one of five possible factors that could have led to blindness. On the "balance of probabilities" test, the hospital would not be liable, since it was more likely that one of the alternate risks had caused the injury.

== Judgment ==
=== Court of Appeal ===
The Court of Appeal applied the "material increase of risk" test, first espoused in McGhee v National Coal Board. The Court found that since the hospital breached its duty and thus increased the risk of harm, and that the plaintiff's injury fell within the ambit of that risk, the hospital was liable despite the fact the plaintiff had not proved the hospital's negligence had caused his injury.

In a minority view of the Court of Appeal, Mustill LJ argued that if it is established that conduct of a certain kind materially adds to the risk of injury, if the defendant engages in such conduct in breach of a common law duty, and if the injury is the kind to which the conduct related, then the defendant is taken to have caused the injury even though the existence and extent of the contribution made by the breach cannot be ascertained.

=== House of Lords ===
The House of Lords found that it was impossible to say that the defendant's negligence had caused, or materially contributed, to the injury and the claim was dismissed. It also stated that McGhee articulated no new rule of law, but was rather based upon a robust inference of fact (this understanding of McGhee was rejected in Fairchild v Glenhaven Funeral Services Ltd).

== See also ==
- Negligence
- Causation in English law
