= Causation in English law =

Aspect of English law

Causation in English law concerns the legal tests of remoteness, causation and foreseeability in the tort of negligence. It is also relevant for English criminal law and English contract law.

In the English law of negligence, causation proves a direct link between the defendant’s negligence and the claimant’s loss and damage. For these purposes, liability in negligence is established when there is a breach of the duty of care owed by the defendant to the claimant that causes loss and damage, and it is reasonable that the defendant should compensate the claimant for that loss and damage.

== 'But for' causation ==
The basic test for establishing causation is the "but for" (or counterfactual) test in which the defendant will be liable only if the claimant’s damage would not have occurred "but for" his negligence. An alternative formulation of the test: a defendant will not be liable if the damage would (or could on the balance of probabilities) have occurred anyway, regardless of their negligence. To understand this, a distinction has to be made between cause and a precondition for the events. Lord Hoffmann in South Australia Asset Management Corp v York Montague Ltd gave a classic example:

"A mountaineer about to undertake a difficult climb is concerned about the fitness of his knee. He goes to a doctor who negligently makes a superficial examination and pronounces the knee fit. The climber goes on the expedition, which he would not have undertaken if the doctor had told him the true state of his knee. He suffers an injury which is an entirely foreseeable consequence of mountaineering but has nothing to do with his knee."

The doctor's negligence does result in the mountaineer running a risk which he otherwise would not have done, but this is insufficient to incur liability. The purpose of the doctor's duty to take care is to protect the mountaineer against injuries caused by the failure of the knee, not rock falls. Even though the injury might be reasonably foreseeable, the doctor is not liable.

=== Some examples ===
In The Empire Jamaica, the owners sent their ship to sea without properly licensed officers. The pilot fell asleep, and a collision occurred. Though the pilot was negligent at the time, he was generally competent. Thus the question for the courts was: were the owners liable for the collision because they sent their ship to sea without properly licensed officers? Or was the factual precondition superseded by the question as to the competence of the pilot? There is no question that sending the ship to sea is "a cause" of the collision. The legal question is whether it is "the cause". This is a question that the courts treat as objective, addressed by evidence and argument. Hart and Honoré (1985) describe the process for establishing legal causation as constructing a parallel series of events (counterfactual situation), and comment: "the parallel series is constructed by asking what the course of events would have been had the defendant acted lawfully." Thus, the owners were not liable. Although they sent the ship to sea without licensed officers (what actually transpired) rather than with licensed officers (the lawful course), the cause of collision was failing to navigate a safe passage. As to the pilot, his lack of licence did not bear on his general competence. The significant factor was the pilot's negligence at the time, and the pilot's lack of license made no difference there. Had the pilot been licensed, he would have been no less likely to sleep. The license would not have awoken him. The owners were, therefore, exonerated on grounds that whether or not the pilot held a license made no difference to the real cause, which was not the pilot's general level of competence, but rather his negligence at the time.

Similarly, in Andrews v Waddingham, the claimant transferred from a "safe" employer's pension scheme to a commercial scheme on the advice of a firm of financial advisers. The breach of duty alleged was confined to advice about the protection afforded by the Policyholders Protection Act 1975 to "with-profits" annuities, and this duty was found to be breached by the first instance judge. The claimant would not have chosen the Equitable Life with-profits annuity if he had been given correct advice, but that did not entitle him to recover the loss he had sustained as a result of his acquiring the annuity. The 1975 Act would have applied if Equitable Life had become insolvent. That was not the case. The real cause of the loss was that the terminal bonuses were not guaranteed and were adversely affected by the downturn in Equitable Life's fortunes. So the negligence as pleaded and as found by the judge did not relate to the fact that the terminal bonuses were not guaranteed.

=== Multiple potential causes ===
The general legal framework for consideration of causation where several competing causes have been put forward involves the following principles:

- it is for the claimant to prove the causation on which they propose to lie
- the defendant may but forward an alternative theory of causation but is under no obligation to do so
- the court may conclude that causation remains doubtful, even in the face of a significant amount of expert evidence being presented
- where the court considers one theory "improbable" and rules out other theories, the "improbable theory" remains such and does not become a "likely" cause by default: Sherlock Holmes' guiding principle, from his investigation in The Sign of the Four (1890), "when you have eliminated the impossible, whatever remains, however improbable, must be the truth", is not imported into the law.

The case of Rhesa Shipping Co SA v Edmunds, records the above as general propositions. Sir Colin Mackay, in Joseph Simon Love v Halfords Ltd., relies on them, noting that they have been "often-cited".

In Pickford v Imperial Chemical Industries (1998), the Lords were asked to determine the cause of repetitive strain injury endured by a typist. Lord Steyn posed the question, "That immediately raises the point that there must be an explanation for the fact that she contracted PDA4. What was the cause of her PDA4? There really was no alternative on the evidence to concluding that this condition was caused by Miss Pickford's typing work." But alternative explanations are that typing might aggravate an inherent condition or generally be an unsuitable occupation for someone with a predisposition to that condition, and neither proves the legal cause. In all cases, the burden of proof is on the claimant to prove the cause as pleaded. There is no burden on the defendant to prove an alternative explanation of the cause of any loss or damage, but a failure to do so may be a factor in deciding whether the claimant's explanation of the cause should be accepted. This test works well in straightforward situations, but it proves less successful in establishing causation in more complex situations where a number of actual or potential causes operate either consecutively or concurrently. For example, in Robinson v Post Office following an accident at work, the claimant had an anti-tetanus injection. Nine days later, there was an adverse reaction to the serum and brain damage resulted. No matter what tests the doctor might have performed, there would have been no sign of an adverse reaction within a reasonable time (see the Bolam Test). The doctor's reasonable decision to provide the standard treatment was therefore not the relevant cause of the brain damage because the claimant would not have been injected "but for" the defendant's negligence. Thus, in deciding between sequential contributions to the final result, the court must decide which is the more substantial contribution.

However, Tomlinson J observed in 2001 that where there were several effective causes of a loss, so long as one party's action "was 'an' effective cause of [the] loss", the chain of causation would not be broken: "the Court need not choose which cause was the most effective".

In the High Court case of Ide v ADB Sales Ltd. (2007) and subsequent appeal (2008), regarding a mountain bike accident, two explanations had been put forward in court. One explanation was rejected by the judge, leaving the alternative explanation to be accepted and allowing the judge in accepting the second explanation to reach the conclusion that this followed from "the totality of the evidence", in this case that the bicycle was defective and the supplier was liable under the Consumer Protection Act 1987.

== Breaking the chain of causation ==
=== Acts of a third party ===
Whether the acts of a third party break the chain of causation depends on whether the intervention was foreseeable. The general rule is that the original defendant will be held responsible for harm caused by a third party as a direct result of his or her negligence, provided it was a highly likely consequence. So, for example, where the defendant has control over the third party, or where the third party is faced with a dilemma created by the defendant, the chain of causation is unlikely to be broken and the defendant will normally be liable to the claimant for the damage caused: Home Office v Dorset Yacht Co Ltd.. The continuity of liability is not imposed merely because the original negligence makes damage by the third party foreseeable, but where the defendant’s negligence makes it very likely that the third party will cause damage to the claimant: Lamb v Camden LBC. In practice, however, the requirement that the third party intervention will usually break the chain and, at the very least, the liability to pay compensation representing the totality of the loss or damage will be apportioned between the two or more tortfeasors. So, for example, if A injures V, it is foreseeable that an ambulance will be called, that paramedics will lift and carry V, and that there will be a journey back to the hospital. This cycle of intervention is continued in the hospital. None of this activity affecting V would arise "but for" the original negligence so A will remain liable unless and until either an unforeseeable B intervenes (e.g. negligently drives his car and collides with the ambulance), or a paramedic or member of the hospital staff is so seriously negligent that it becomes a new cause of action.

== Public policy ==
Policy at this level is less than ordre public, but nevertheless significant. The policy is to give bound to the scope of people who can claim damages, how much they can claim, and within what timeframe.

The claimant must prove that the breach of the duty of care caused actionable damage. The test for these purposes is a balance between proximity and remoteness:

- that there was a factual link between what the defendant did or failed to do, and the loss and damage sustained by the claimant, and
- that it was reasonably foreseeable at the relevant time that this behaviour would cause loss and damage of that type.

To clarify the nature of the judicial process, in Lamb v Camden LBC, Lord Denning said:

"The truth is that all these three – duty, remoteness and causation – are all devices by which the courts limit the range of liability for negligence . . . All these devices are useful in their way. But ultimately it is a question of policy for the judges to decide."

In other words, the court's main task is to do justice as between these parties in their present situation. For this purpose, a weighing evaluative process is required, rather than a clear-cut rule of law. For example, in Meah v McCreamer and others (No. 2), the claimant suffered head injuries and brain damage as a result of the defendant's negligent driving, which led to a personality disorder. Four years later, he sexually assaulted and raped three women. The illegal nature of his conduct was not raised at the civil trial, and the claimant was held entitled to damages to compensate him for being imprisoned following his conviction. In separate proceedings, the three women assaulted obtained a judgment for compensation, so he sought indemnification from the negligent driver and his insurers for the amounts he had been ordered to pay. This was not a claim for his own personal injuries nor direct financial loss, but indirect loss. The three women could not have sued the driver directly because they were not foreseeable and so no duty of care was owed to them. The question was whether a person convicted of a crime was entitled to be indemnified against the consequences of that crime. Woolf J. held that the action would be dismissed on two grounds. First, the damages were too remote to be recoverable and, if such actions were to be allowed, it would leave insurers open to indefinite liability for an indefinite duration. Secondly, as a matter of policy, defendants should not have a right to be indemnified against the consequences of their crimes. In Clunis v Camden and Islington Health Authority the claimant had been discharged from hospital where he had been detained under s3 of the Mental Health Act 1983. He was to receive aftercare services in the community under s117 Act 1983, but his mental condition deteriorated and, two months later, he fatally stabbed a stranger at a London Underground station. He pleaded guilty to manslaughter on the ground of diminished responsibility and was ordered to be detained in a secure hospital. Subsequently, he brought an action against his local health authority for negligence. The health authority applied to strike out the claim as disclosing no cause of action on two grounds. First, that the claim arose out of the health authority's statutory obligations under s117 Act 1983 and those obligations did not give rise to a common law duty of care. Secondly, that the claim was based on the plaintiff's own criminal act. In the Court of Appeal, the health authority's appeal was allowed on both grounds.

== Loss of a chance ==
In loss of chance cases, the court is invited to assess hypothetical outcomes, either affecting the claimant or a third party where the defendant's negligence deprived the claimant of the opportunity to obtain a benefit or avoid a loss. Although it has been relatively unsuccessful in cases of medical negligence, it does provide a remedy in professional negligence generally.

== Causation: law and science compared ==
Philosophy and science seek the explanation of phenomena and look to relationships and concurrences. Law is not concerned rerum cognoscere causas, but with attributing responsibility to persons.

— Windeyer J (High Court of Australia), National Insurance Company of New Zealand Ltd v Espagne

Science and law have different functions but share striking similarities. Both purport to provide rational, reasoned, independent, unbiased processes concerned with the objective assessment of evidence. There are also striking differences. Scientific assertions compared with determinations of legal causation have the following characteristics:

- they are population-based, not individual; general not particular;
- they are probabilistic, not deterministic;
- they are generally expressed as the refutation of the hypothesis and not a finding of fact or proof of an allegation;
- the evidence is not exhaustive, whereas an adjudication is determined according to the evidence available.

The major distinction between legal determinations and scientific assertions lies in the concept of certainty. The legal concept of causation is deterministic: it is an expression of the fiction of certainty, an absolute concept. The scientific concept of causation is probabilistic: it is an expression of the uncertainty of truth, an asymptotic concept.

== See also ==
- Damages
- Remoteness in English law
