= Attia v British Gas plc =

Attia v British Gas Plc
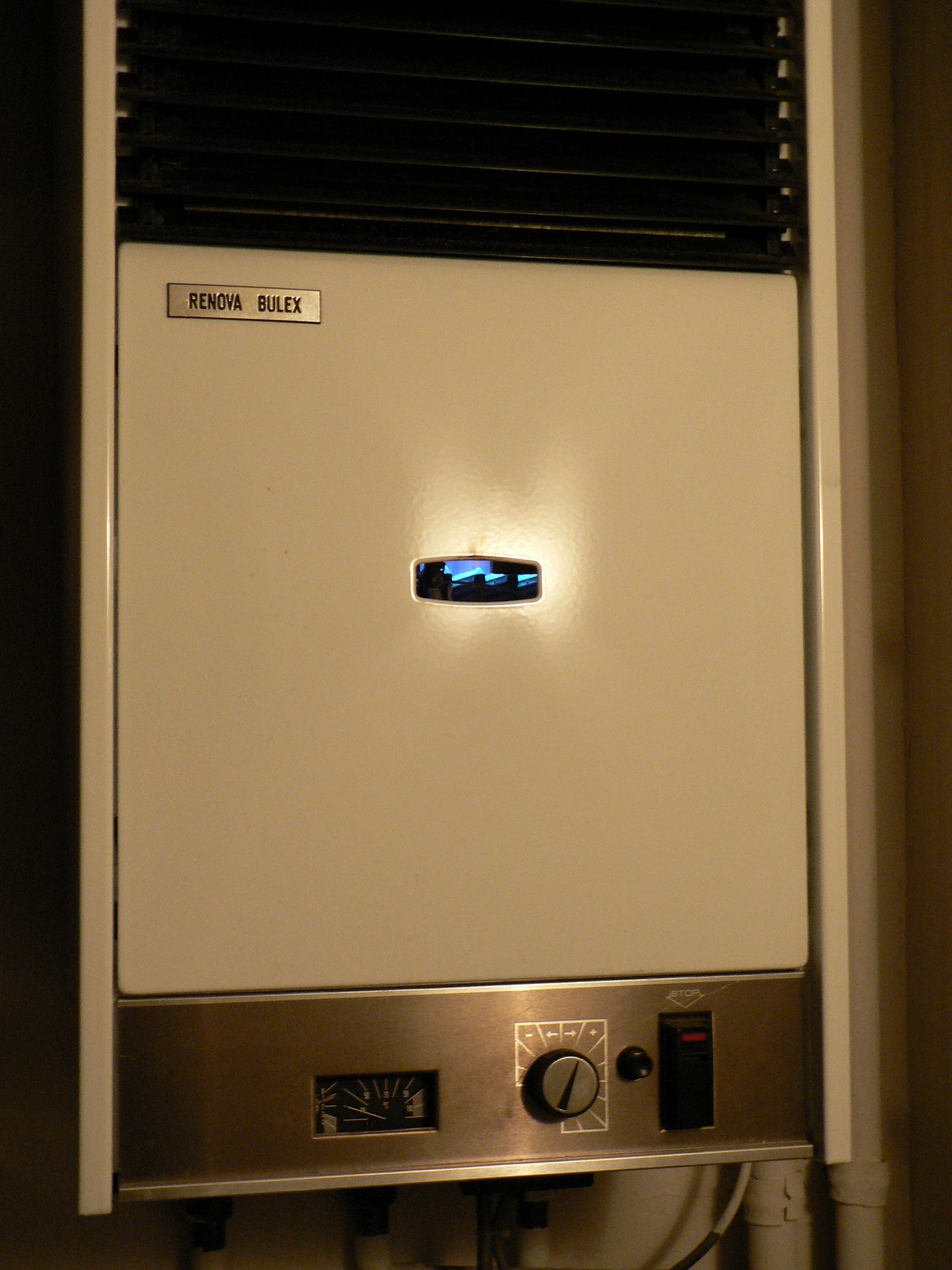
- Court: Court of Appeal
- Citation: [1988] QB 304

Keywords
- Nervous shock, destruction of property

Attia v British Gas Plc [1987] EWCA Civ 8 is an English tort law case, establishing that nervous shock from witnessing the destruction of personal property may be actionable. Prior to this case, a duty of care for an individual's mental health had not been established in situations not involving personal injury or the witnessing of such an event. The Court of Appeal ruled that British Gas were liable for the subsequent shock and depression of Mrs Attia, following the near total destruction of her home and possessions.

== Facts of the Case ==
British Gas plc were to install central heating in Mrs Attia's home. Whilst installing the system, an employee of British Gas negligently started a fire, which largely destroyed the home and contents within. At first instance, Attia's claim that British Gas had caused her mental shock and distress was denied, with the trial judge holding that damages could only be recovered for psychiatric harm where physical harm to an individual is found.

== Judgment of the Case ==
The Court of Appeal held that Ms Attia could recover damages for psychiatric harm, consequent on the damage to her home. Bingham LJ noted that the decision was breaking new ground, but nevertheless held it was a modest extension to the categories of legitimate claimants.

It is submitted, I think rightly, that this claim breaks new ground. No analogous claim has ever, to my knowledge, been upheld or even advanced. If, therefore, it were proper to erect a doctrinal boundary stone at the point which the onward march of recorded decisions has so far reached, we should answer the question of principle in the negative and dismiss the plaintiff's action, as the deputy judge did. But I should for my part erect the boundary stone with a strong presentiment that it would not be long before a case would arise so compelling on its facts as to cause the stone to be moved to a new and more distant resting place. The suggested boundary line is not, moreover, one that commends itself to me as either fair or convenient. Examples which arose in argument illustrate the point. Suppose, for example, that a scholar's life's work of research or composition were destroyed before his eyes as a result of a defendant's careless conduct, causing the scholar to suffer reasonably foreseeable psychiatric damage. Or suppose that a householder returned home to find that his most cherished possessions had been destroyed through the carelessness of an intruder in starting a fire or leaving a tap running, causing reasonably foreseeable psychiatric damage to the owner. I do not think a legal principle which forbade recovery in these circumstances could be supported. The only policy argument relied on as justifying or requiring such a restriction was the need to prevent a proliferation of claims, the familiar floodgates argument. This is not an argument to be automatically discounted. But nor is it, I think, an argument which can claim a very impressive record of success. All depends on one's judgment of the likely result of a particular extension of the law. I do not myself think that refusal by this court to lay down the legal principle for which the defendants contend, or (put positively) our acceptance that a claim such as the plaintiff's may in principle succeed, will lead to a flood of claims or actions, let alone a flood of successful claims or actions. Insistence that psychiatric damage must be reasonably foreseeable, coupled with clear recognition that a plaintiff must prove psychiatric damage as I have defined it, and not merely grief, sorrow or emotional distress, will in my view enable the good sense of the judge to ensure, adopting Lord Wright's language in Bourhill v Young [1943] AC 92, 110, that the thing stops at the appropriate point. His good sense provides a better, because more flexible, mechanism of control than a necessarily arbitrary rule of law. I would therefore answer this broad question of principle in favour of the plaintiff.

== Significance of the Case ==
The decision in Attia came before that of Alcock v Chief Constable of South Yorkshire, where close relatives and witnesses of large scale physical harm were barred from recovery for subsequent psychiatric harm. It therefore remains to be seen – though it seems unlikely – whether in light of this decision, this principle would be reaffirmed.

== See also ==
- English tort law
- Nervous shock (English Law)
