= List of judgments of the Supreme Court of the United Kingdom delivered in 2024 =

This is a list of the judgments given by the Supreme Court of the United Kingdom in the year 2024.

In 2024, Lord Reed of Allermuir was the President of the Supreme Court; Lord Hodge was the Deputy President.

The table lists judgments made by the court and the opinions of the judges in each case. Judges are treated as having concurred in another's judgment when they either formally attach themselves to the judgment of another or speak only to acknowledge their concurrence with one or more judges. Any judgment which reaches a conclusion which differs from the majority on one or more major points of the appeal has been treated as dissent.

All dates are for 2024 unless expressly stated otherwise.

== 2024 case summaries ==
Unless otherwise noted, cases were heard by a panel of 5 judges.

Cases involving Scots law are highlighted in orange. Cases involving Northern Irish law are highlighted in green.

Case name	Citation	Date	Legal subject	Summary of decision
Paul & Anor v Royal Wolverhampton NHS Trust	[2024] UKSC 1	11 January 2024	Tort law, Nervous shock	A person cannot claim compensation for a recognised psychiatric illness caused by witnessing the death or injury of a close family member or other loved one or any others due to medical negligence. Such an event is not discrete enough to qualify as a recognisable accident that incurs liability.
Herculito Maritime Ltd and others v Gunvor International BV and others	[2024] UKSC 2	17 January 2024	Admiralty law, Insurance law	That decision had held that the contracts of carriage contained in or evidenced by a series of bills of lading did not preclude the shipowner, and thus its subrogated insurers (the respondents), from seeking a contribution in General Average from Cargo Interests and their subrogated insurers (the appellants) after a piratical seizure of the POLAR in the Gulf of Aden had necessitated the payment out of a US$7 million ransom.
In the matter of an application by Stephen Hilland for Judicial Review	[2024] UKSC 4	7 February 2024	Parole	A person on release from prison can have conditions applied to their parole which are not applied to prisoners on similar sentences.
Jersey Choice Ltd v His Majesty’s Treasury	[2024] UKSC 5	14 February 2024	Value-added tax	A company in the Channel Islands has no claim to loss and damage as a result of removing low value consignment relief from mail order imports into the UK from the Channel Islands.
Armstead v Royal & Sun Alliance Insurance Company Ltd	[2024] UKSC 6	14 February 2024	Tort law, Remoteness, Burden of proof	A victim is entitled to recover damages for contractual liabilities to third parties resulting from the tortfeasor's physical damage to property. This loss does not constitute pure economic loss. The burden of proof lies with the defendant to demonstrate that the claim is not a reasonable pre-estimate of the actual loss and is thus too remote. If the claim is deemed unreasonable, only the actual foreseeable loss of use can be recovered.
In the matter of an application by RM (a person under disability) by SM, his father and next friend (AP) for Judicial Review	[2024] UKSC 7	21 February 2024	Mental Health Act 1983	A patient in Northern Ireland mental healthcare can rely on relevant case regarding the England and Wales where the legislative language in the Mental Health Act 1983 and the Mental Health (Northern Ireland) Order 1986.
Lifestyle Equities CV and another v Amazon UK Services Ltd and others	[2024] UKSC 8	21 February 2024	Trade Marks Act 1994	A seller can not sell goods that infringe on UK trade marks, by delivering to the UK, while selling goods with USA marks and using a US website.
Bertino v Public Prosecutor's Office, Italy	[2024] UKSC 9	6 March 2024	European Arrest Warrant, Extradition Act 2003	A criminal defendant has the right to be present at trial as guaranteed by article 6 of the European Convention of Human Rights.
Merticariu v Judecatoria Arad, Romania	[2024] UKSC 10	6 March 2024	European Arrest Warrant, Extradition Act 2003	A criminal defendant has the right to be present at trial as guaranteed by article 6 of the European Convention of Human Rights.
Hassam and another v Rabot and another	[2024] UKSC 11	26 March 2024	Tort law	In determining the damages payable for pain, suffering and loss of amenity due the Civil Liability Act 2019 should be used in the case of whiplash injuries and common law awards should be applied in non-whiplash injuries.
Secretary of State for Business and Trade (Respondent) v Mercer	[2024] UKSC 12	17 April 2024	Labour law	Section 146 of the Trade Union and Labour Relations (Consolidation) Act 1992 is incompatible with article 11 of the ECHR.
Sharp Corp Ltd v Viterra BV	[2024] UKSC 14	8 May 2024		
Davies v Bridgend County Borough Council	[2024] UKSC 15	8 May 2024		
Argentum Exploration Ltd v Republic of South Africa	[2024] UKSC 16	8 May 2024		
Lifestyle Equities CV & Anor v Ahmed & Anor	[2024] UKSC 17	15 May 2024		
RTI Ltd v MUR Shipping BV	[2024] UKSC 18	15 May 2024	Commercial law, Force majeure	A reasonable endeavours proviso in a force majeure clause does not oblige a contractual party to accept an offer of non-contractual performance, unless expressly stated otherwise. This principle is based on the freedom of contract, which includes the freedom not to contract, and the importance of legal certainty.
George v Cannell & Anor	[2024] UKSC 19	12 June 2024		
R (on the application of Finch on behalf of the Weald Action Group) v Surrey County Council and others	[2024] UKSC 20	20 June 2024		
Mueen-Uddin v Secretary of State for the Home Department	[2024] UKSC 21	20 June 2024		
The Manchester Ship Canal Company Ltd v United Utilities Water Ltd (Respondent) No 2	[2024] UKSC 22	2 July 2024		
