= Nigel Bridge, Baron Bridge of Harwich =

British judge

The Right Honourable The Lord Bridge of Harwich PC
- Portrait by Nick Sinclair, 1992

Lord of Appeal in Ordinary
- In office 1980–1992
- Monarch: Elizabeth II

Lord Justice of Appeal
- In office 1975–1980

Member of the House of Lords
- Lord Temporal
- Lord of Appeal in Ordinary; 29 September 1980 – 20 November 2007

Personal details
- Born: 26 February 1917 Nigel Cyprian Bridge
- Died: 20 November 2007 (aged 90)
- Spouse: Margaret Swinbank (m. 1944; died 2006)

Nigel Cyprian Bridge, Baron Bridge of Harwich, PC (26 February 1917 − 20 November 2007) was a British judge, who served as Lord of Appeal in Ordinary between 1980 and 1992. A leading appellate judge, Bridge is also remembered for having presided over the Birmingham Six trial.

== Early life ==
Bridge was born in Codicote, Hertfordshire, the second son of Commander Cyprian Dunscomb Charles Bridge, Royal Navy, and of Gladys Bridge, née Steel, the daughter of a Lancashire cotton manufacturer. He never met his father, who had abandoned his mother shortly after his birth. He was the younger brother of Tony Bridge, later Dean of Guildford.

He followed his elder brother to Marlborough College, with a scholarship. Disliking the school, he went to Europe, where he learned French and German. Returning to Britain, he worked as a journalist on regional newspapers in Lancashire, and wrote an unpublished novel.

He volunteered to join the Fleet Air Arm before the Second World War broke out, but was rejected as being colour blind. He was instead conscripted into the British Army in 1940, and commissioned into the King's Royal Rifle Corps, serving in Italy, north-west Europe, and Germany. He was demobilised in 1946 with the rank of captain.

Shortly after he was commissioned, and without any previous experience, he successfully defended a soldier on a charge of desertion at a court-martial. He then became much in demand as a defending officer, giving him a taste for advocacy.

== Legal career ==
Bridge was called to the bar at Inner Temple in 1947, having achieved the first place in that year's bar exams. After pupillage under Martin Jukes, he joined a set of chambers specializing in personal injury cases, before joining John Widgery's chambers at 3 Temple Gardens in 1950, where he specialized in local government and planning law.

From 1964 to 1968, he was Junior Counsel to the Treasury (Common Law), commonly known as Treasury Devil. He was the last Treasury Devil to try a case from private practice while in office. He was made a bencher at Inner Temple in 1964, Reader in 1985 and Treasurer in 1986.

By tradition Treasury Devils were appointed to the High Court after their term, and after four years as Treasury Devil, Bridge was appointed a Justice of the High Court of Justice in 1968, receiving the customary knighthood. Assigned to the Queen's Bench Division, he was presiding Judge of the Western Circuit from 1972–74.

=== Birmingham Six trial ===
In 1975, Bridge was the presiding judge at the trial of the Birmingham Six, who were accused of bombings in Birmingham in November 1974. It was his last case before he joined the Court of Appeal. The trial was marred by Bridge's health: at various points it was interrupted to allow him to see a dentist, for treatment for acute gastritis, and for lunchtime naps on his doctor's orders. He lost his voice during the summing up, which was criticised as being biased against the defendants. He also admitted into evidence the defendants' confessions, despite the defence arguing that they were beaten out of them. During sentencing, he said that there was "the clearest and most overwhelming evidence I have ever heard in a case of murder". The convictions were quashed by the Court of Appeal in 1991, after the defendants had served 16 years in prison.

As a result of the trial, Bridge was added to the IRA's hit-list, and his house came under constant police protection. In a 1992 interview, Bridge said that he felt "unhappy", but not "guilty", about what had happened at the trial.

=== Court of Appeal and House of Lords ===
Bridge became a Lord Justice of Appeal in 1975, and was sworn of the Privy Council. In the Court of Appeal he sometimes clashed with Lord Denning. He was mooted as a successor to Lord Widgery as Lord Chief Justice in 1979, and to Lord Denning as Master of the Rolls in 1982, but did not secure either position. He became a Lord of Appeal in Ordinary on 29 September 1980, and was created a life peer with the title Baron Bridge of Harwich, of Harwich, in the County of Essex. On his appointment, he was the only law lord without a university degree.

He was a member of the Security Commission from 1977 and 1985, serving as chairman from 1982. In that capacity, he reported on the Geoffrey Prime and Michael Bettaney spying cases; he also led a review in vetting arrangements for Buckingham Palace staff. In 1985, Bridge was tasked with reviewing telephone tapping by MI5; after he examined 6,129 instances of phone tapping in three days and found all of them to be justified, he was attacked by Roy Jenkins in The Times as "the poodle of the executive". However, he joined Lord Oliver of Aylmerton in dissenting from the majority decision in the Spycatcher case, criticising the government's case to prevent publication of the contents of Peter Wright's book as "ridiculous".

He supported the majority decision in the Gillick case on medical consent in 1985, and in the McLoughlin v O'Brian case on recovery of damages for nervous shock.

He was elected an honorary fellow of Wolfson College, Cambridge in 1989.

He served as Chairman of the Ecclesiastical Committee in Parliament.

== Later life ==
Bridge retired from the bench on reaching the compulsory retirement age of 75 in 1992. He was chairman of the Church of England Synodical Government Review from 1993–97. In retirement, he studied mathematics with the Open University, obtained a Bachelor of Science in 2003, aged 86.

Toward the end of his life he suffered a number of strokes. He died of cancer in London on 20 November 2007.

== Family ==
Bridge married Margaret Swinbank, then a secretary at the War Office and the daughter of Leonard Heseltine Swinbank, on 8 January 1944. They had two daughters and one son. Lady Bridge of Harwich died in 2006.

== Selected cases ==
- Borden (UK) Ltd v Scottish Timber Products Ltd [1981] Ch 25
- McLoughlin v O'Brian [1983] 1 AC 410
- Attorney-General v Guardian Newspapers Ltd [1987] 1 WLR 1248 (the Spycatcher case)
- Wilsher v Essex Area Health Authority [1988] AC 1074
- R v Secretary of State for Transport, Ex p Factortame Ltd [1990] 2 AC 85 (Factortame I)
- Caparo Industries plc v Dickman [1990] 2 AC 605
- Abbey National Building Society v Cann [1991] 1 AC 56
- Lloyds Bank plc v Rosset [1991] 1 AC 107
- Murphy v Brentwood District Council [1991] 1 AC 398
- Alcock v Chief Constable of South Yorkshire Police [1992] 1 AC 310
- Ruxley Electronics & Construction Ltd v Forsyth [1996] AC 344

== Arms ==
Coat of arms of Nigel Bridge, Baron Bridge of Harwich

Crest
An Eagle rising proper the Beak Or holding therein a Sprig of Lilac also proper
Escutcheon
Azure issuant from the centre of a Bar wavy of Water proper in the nombril point of a Bridge of three Arches embattled Argent masoned Sable the whole between as many Sealions naiant guardant and each crowned with a Mural Crown Gold
Supporters
Dexter: A Winged Horse in trian aspect Argent hooved Or resting the dexter hoof upon a Portcullis chained also Or; Sinister: a Sealion in trian aspect all Argent resting the sinister forepaw on a Portcullis chained Gold, the Compartment comprising a Grassy Mount growing therefrom on a Rose Gules barbed stalked and leaved proper another Rose Argent barbed and seeded also proper between on the dexter a Rose Argent and on the sinister a Rose Gules both barbed seeded stalked and leaved proper on the sinister side of the mount a Flat Rock proper
Motto
Me Juvat Ire Per Altem (I rejoice in treading the high path)

== Sources ==
- "DodOnline". Archived from the original on 7 December 2006.
- "Last word", bbc.co.uk, 30 November 2007
- Obituaries:
  - The Daily Telegraph, 27 March 2008
  - The Times, 27 March 2008
  - The Independent, 27 March 2008
  - The Guardian, 27 March 2008
- British Army Officers 1939−1945
