= Chadwick v British Rlys Board =

UK 1967 High Court case

Chadwick v. British Railways Board [1967] 2 All ER 945 was an English High Court (Queen's Bench Division) judgement, dealing with the possibility of recovering psychiatric harm suffered by helpers who have witnessed and assisted at an accident. The Court ruled that such helpers, as "primary victims" of the accident, could recover the damage caused by nervous shock in the same way as personal injury, unlike "secondary victims", who have merely witnessed the accident without being directly involved in it.

== Facts ==
The plaintiff, Henry Chadwick (Ellen Chadwick suing as administratrix of the estate of her late husband Henry Chadwick who had died in 1962) was described as a cheerful man who was very active in his local community and ran a successful window cleaning business. Though he had suffered in 1941 with psycho-neurotic symptoms, in following years he suffered no such symptoms.

Chadwick and his wife lived 200 yards from the site of the Lewisham rail crash and upon hearing of the incident Chadwick went immediately to the site to assist and remained there until 6am the following day. Due to his small stature Chadwick was able to climb inside the wreckage to assist those who were trapped or injured inside.

A key witness to this incident referred to only as Mrs Taylor who was trapped inside of the wreckage described the scene as a "sea of bodies", though she also described Chadwick as being "a most courageous man, very cheerful and encouraging, who allayed the fears of those around".

Having assisted at a site of the Lewisham rail crash, Chadwick had become ill with anxiety disorder and required hospital treatment. He was no longer able to work and no longer took any interest or pleasure in activities which he had once been highly involved. He died in 1962 of causes unrelated to the accident. His personal representatives had sued the British Railways Board, which had negligently caused the accident.

== Judgment ==
The Court found in favour of the plaintiff for the following reasons:

1. It was reasonably foreseeable in the event of such an accident as had occurred that someone other than defendants’ servants might try to rescue passengers and might suffer injury in the process; accordingly defendants owed a duty of care towards Mr Chadwick.
2. Injury by shock to a rescuer, physically unhurt, was reasonably foreseeable, and the fact that the risk run by a rescuer was not exactly the same as that run by a passenger did not deprive the rescuer of his remedy.
3. Damages were recoverable for injury by shock notwithstanding that the shock was not caused by the injured person's fear for his own safety or for the safety of his children;
4. As a man who had lived a normal busy life in the community with no mental illness for 16 years, there was nothing in Mr Chadwick's personality to put him outside the ambit of defendants’ contemplation so as to render the damage suffered by him too remote.

== See also ==
- Nervous shock (English Law)
- White v Chief Constable of the South Yorkshire Police
- Page v Smith
