= Duty of care in English law =

In English tort law, an individual may owe a duty of care to another, in order to ensure that they do not suffer any unreasonable harm or loss. If such a duty is found to be breached, a legal liability will be imposed upon the tortfeasor to compensate the victim for any losses they incur. The idea of individuals owing strangers a duty of care – where beforehand such duties were only found from contractual arrangements – developed at common law, throughout the 20th century. The doctrine was significantly developed in the case of Donoghue v Stevenson, where a woman succeeded in establishing a manufacturer of ginger beer owed her a duty of care, where it had been negligently produced. Following this, the duty concept has expanded into a coherent judicial test, which must be satisfied in order to claim in negligence.

Generally, a duty of care arises where one individual or group undertakes an activity which could reasonably harm another (or themselves), either physically, mentally, or economically. This includes common activities such as driving (where physical injury may occur), as well as specialised activities such as dispensing reliant economic advice (where economic loss may occur). Where an individual has not created a situation which may cause harm, no duty of care exists to warn others of dangerous situations or prevent harm occurring to them; such acts are known as pure omissions, and liability may only arise where a prior special relationship exists to necessitate them.

== Duty of care ==
The first element of negligence is the legal duty of care. This concerns the relationship between the defendant and the claimant, which must be such that there is an obligation upon the defendant to take proper care to avoid causing injury to the plaintiff in all the circumstances of the case. There are two ways in which a duty of care may be established:

1. the defendant and claimant are within one of the recognised relationships where a duty of care is established by precedent; or
2. outside these relationships, according to the principles developed by case law.

The principles delineated in Caparo v Dickman specify a tripartite test:

1. Was the harm reasonably foreseeable?
2. Was there a requisite degree of proximity between the claimant and the defendant?
3. Is it fair, just and reasonable to impose a duty of care; are there precluding public policy concerns?

There are a number of distinct and recognisable situations in which the courts recognise the existence of a duty of care. Examples include

- one road-user to another
- employer to employee
- manufacturer to consumer
- doctor to patient
- solicitor to client
- teacher to student

The common law position regarding negligence recognised strict categories of negligence. In 1932, the duty of a care applied despite no prior relationship or interaction and was not constrained by privity of contract. Here, a duty of care was found to be owed by a manufacturer to an end consumer, for negligence in the production of his goods. Mrs Donoghue's claim for damages for gastroenteritis and nervous shock were allowed, where a ginger beer manufacturer had negligently allowed a snail into a bottle, which she had consumed. Lord Atkin established liability on the basis that a neighbour principle existed between the two parties, to ensure reasonable care was taken in the production of the ginger beer, so as not to cause Mrs Donoghue any unreasonable harm:

There must be, and is, some general conception of relations giving rise to a duty of care, of which the particular cases found in the books are but instances. ... The rule that you are to love your neighbour becomes in law you must not injure your neighbour; and the lawyer's question: Who is my neighbour? receives a restricted reply. You must take reasonable care to avoid acts or omissions which you can reasonably foresee would be likely to injure your neighbour. Who, then, in law, is my neighbour? The answer seems to be - persons who are so closely and directly affected by my act that I ought reasonably to have them in contemplation as being so affected when I am directing my mind to the acts or omissions that are called in question.

Lord Atkin's speech established a neighbour principle, or a general duty that individuals must take reasonable care in their actions or omissions, so as not to cause harm to others proximate to them. It did not matter that Mrs Donoghue was unidentified or unknown to the manufacturer; as the type of harm which occurred was foreseeable through the negligence of the ginger beer manufacturer.

=== The Anns test ===
Following the firm establishment of the neighbour principle in negligence, it became clear in subsequent years that it did not represent an easily applicable approach to new forms of duty, or to unprecedented situations of negligence. As such, new categories of negligence evolved, as in Hedley Byrne & Co Ltd v Heller & Partners Ltd, to cover different types of negligent acts, rather than a coherent doctrine or ratio being taken from Donoghue v Stevenson. Some thirty years after Donoghue was decided, in Home Office v Dorset Yacht Co Ltd, Lord Reid stated judicially that: "the time has come when we can and should say that it ought to apply unless there is some justification or valid explanation for its exclusion." It was not until the case of Anns v Merton London Borough Council however, that the neighbour principle was adopted in a formal test for negligence. The case involved the negligent construction of a block of maisonettes, commissioned by the Merton London Borough Council. The flats, finished in 1972, had poorly constructed foundations, resulting in sloping of floors, and cracks in the walls. The lessees of the maisonettes sued the council in negligence, alleging a duty of care existed for the building to be properly constructed and in a usable state.

In rejecting the previous evolution of duty of care, a categorical approach where a claim would have to fit under previous situations a duty had been found, the House of Lords unanimously found a duty to exist. The test established by Lord Wilberforce – known as the Anns test – imposed a prima facie duty of care where:

- A sufficient relationship of proximity or neighbourhood exists between the alleged wrongdoer and the person who has suffered damage, such that carelessness on the part of the former is likely to cause damage to the latter;
- There are no considerations relevant which may reduce or limit the scope of any imposed duty.

=== The three stage test ===
Following the establishment of the two stage test for a duty of care, there was a marked judicial retreat from the test, which was widely seen as being too inclusive, and being too easily applicable to cases which might be contrary to public policy. The test was formally overruled in Murphy v Brentwood District Council, where the House of Lords invoked the Practice Statement to depart from the Anns test. The resultant test for a duty of care - which remains good law today - can be found in the judgments of Caparo Industries plc v Dickman. A large criticism of the Anns test had been that it combined the test for proximity of relationship with foresee-ability of harm. Whereas Lord Atkin's neighbour principle emphasised a need for both a proximate relationship, as well as a foreseeability of harm, the Anns test did not make such a clear distinction. Richard Kidner has stated that this led the courts to sometimes ignore relevant policy considerations, and to encourage "lazy thinking and woolly analysis". The resounding test attempts to reconcile the need for a control device, proximity of relationship, with foreseeability of harm. Lord Oliver's speech in Caparo Industries PLC v Dickman summarises the test for a duty of care:

- The harm which occurred must be a reasonable foreseeable result of the defendant's conduct;
- A sufficient relationship of proximity or neighbourhood exists between the alleged wrongdoer and the person who has suffered damage;
- It is fair, just and reasonable to impose liability.

In reintroducing the need for proximity as a central control device, it has been stated that these three stages are 'ingredients' of liability, rather than tests in their own right. For example, liability can arise between complete strangers, where positive acts involving foreseeable physical harm occur; where negligent omissions and misstatements occur however, it is necessary to show a proximate relationship, as well as a foresee-ability of harm.

== Status of the claimant ==
The status of the claimant in an act of negligence can result in a duty of care arising where it would not normally – as is the case with rescuers – or prevent a duty of care existing altogether. Claims that a doctor may owe a mother a duty of care to advise against child birth, and claims that police may owe an individual involved in criminal behavior a duty of care, have been barred. In McKay v Essex Area Health Authority, a child's claim that a doctor should have advised his mother to seek an abortion was struck out; Whilst the Congenital Disabilities (Civil Liability) Act allows a course of action where negligence is the cause of a disability, wrongful life has remained barred for policy reasons. Similarly, where a criminal attempted to escape police capture in Vellino v Chief Constable of the Greater Manchester, his claim that they owed him a duty of care not to let him escape after they had arrested him was branded 'self-evidently absurd'.

=== Rescuers ===
"Danger invites rescue. The cry of distress is the summons to relief. The law does not ignore these reactions of the mind in tracing conduct to its consequences. It recognises them as normal. It places their efforts within the range of the natural and probable. The wrong that imperils life is a wrong to the imperilled victim; it is a wrong also to his rescuer."
Cardozo J, Wagner v International Railway Co (1921) 133 NE 437, 232 NY 176

It has been established at common law that those who attempt rescue are owed a duty of care by those who create dangerous situations, in which it is foreseeable rescuers may intervene. This duty can apply to professional rescuers – such as doctors or lifeguards – as much as ordinary individuals, and may even apply where the rescuer engages in a careless or reckless rescue attempt. The basis for this liability was first recognised in Haynes v Harwood. Here, a child who threw a stone at a horse, causing it to bolt, was liable to a policeman who attempted to stop it subsequently, and was injured. The duty was confirmed in the later case of Baker v T E Hopkins & Son Ltd, with Wilmer LJ stating that:

Assuming the rescuer not to have acted unreasonably, therefore, it seems to me that he must normally belong to the class of persons who ought to be within the contemplation of the wrongdoer as being closely and directly affected by the latter's act.

The duty of care owed to a rescuer is separate from that owed to those he is rescuing. Where individuals trespassed onto a railway line, putting themselves in danger, they were not owed a duty of care; however, the stationmaster who attempted rescue and was fatally injured was owed a duty of care, as it was foreseeable he would attempt a rescue. Equally, a duty of care may arise where an individual imperils himself, and a rescuer is injured, despite the individual clearly owing himself no duty of care.

== Duty of care for omissions ==
"One can put the matter in political moral or economic terms. In political terms it is less of an invasion of an individual's freedom for the law to require him to consider the safety of others in his actions than to impose upon him a duty to rescue or protect. A moral version of this point may be called the ‘Why pick on me?' argument."
Lord Hoffmann, Stovin v Wise [1996] AC 923

Generally, no duty of care may arise in relation to pure omissions; acts which if taken would minimise or prevent harm to another individual. However, where an individual creates a dangerous situation - even if blamelessly - a duty of care may arise to protect others from being harmed. Where an individual left his car without lights on at the side of a carriageway, he owed a duty of care to other drivers, despite the road being well lit, and was thus jointly liable when another driver collided with his car.

There are however certain circumstances in which an individual may be liable for omissions, where a prior special relationship exists. Such a relationship may be imposed by statute; the Occupiers' Liability acts for example impose a duty of care upon occupiers of land and properties to protect – in as far as is reasonable – others from harm. In other cases, a relationship may be inferred or imposed based on the need to protect an individual from third parties. In Stansbie v Troman a decorator failed to secure a household he was decorating, resulting in a burglary while he was absent; it was found he owed a duty to the household owner to adequately secure the premises in his absence. An authority or service may equally owe a duty of care to individuals to protect them from harm. In Reeves v Commissioner of Police of the Metropolis, the police were found to have owed a duty to a prisoner – who was known to be a suicide risk – to ensure he did not commit suicide in their custody. Authorities have also been found liable for failing to protect against the risks of third parties, in certain circumstances. An education authority was found to owe a duty of care to motorists to protect against the risk of a young children in a public road; a driver was injured when forced to swerve, after a four-year-old child escaped and ran into the path of oncoming traffic.

A duty of care will also apply to an omission if a dangerous act was committed by a third party on the defendant's property which he knew about or should have known about, and he did not take reasonable steps to avert damage to neighbouring properties.

== Special types of harm ==
=== Psychiatric harm ===
The duty of care owed to protect others from psychiatric harm is different from that owed for physical harm, with additional control devices and distinctions present in order to limit liability. A successful claim for psychiatric harm must result from a sudden shock (caused by a traumatising event), and the victim must be of ordinary fortitude and mental strength, and not especially susceptible to the harm in question. Whilst a prima facie duty of care is imposed for physical harm where the criteria of proximity, foreseeability, and policy are fulfilled, liability for psychiatric harm rests upon an individual's connection to a traumatising event; those not physically endangered may not be owed a duty of care unless they can fulfil several relational criteria.

The decision of Page v Smith establishes liability for psychiatric harm where an individual is endangered physically. Victims in this category are known as primary victims, and are automatically owed a duty of care, as explained by Lord Lloyd:

Once it is established that the defendant is under a duty of care to avoid causing personal injury to the plaintiff, it matters not whether the injury in fact sustained is physical, psychiatric or both.

— Page v Smith [1996] AC 155, at 190

Further individuals are classed as secondary victims, and must meet several criteria in order to establish a duty of care is owed to them. There are several types of victims whom the court have recognised; employees who suffer excessive stress at work, (Note: Recognised as primary victims in Walker v Northumberland County Council [1995] 1 All ER 737) individuals witnessing the destruction of their property, (Note: Recognised possibly as primary victims since the Alcock criteria were not applied in Attia v British Gas plc [1988] QB 304) while those witnessing especially traumatising scenes involving others are secondary victims. Case law surrounding psychiatric harm focuses primarily on secondary victims; recovery for witnessing the injury and harm of others has been limited primarily by the decision of Alcock v Chief Constable of South Yorkshire, which establishes several boundaries and criteria for imposing liability. There must be a close tie of 'love and affection' between the primary victim, and the secondary victim witnessing the traumatic event. Additionally, the cause of the harm must be close and proximate to the shocking event in question, and it must be witnessed by the means of the victim's senses, and not via some form of communication.

=== Pure economic loss ===
Negligence which causes no physical or psychiatric harm, but causes economic loss to an individual or organisation, is termed pure economic loss. The idea that a duty of care may be owed to protect against the economic loss of others has been seen as problematic, as the bounds of such liability are potentially unforeseeable, and difficult to establish. Thus, there are several limits in place on the recovery of pure economic loss, with some categories of economic loss being totally unrecoverable altogether. Those affected by damage caused to the property of another company or individual, or who suffer loss due to the purchase of a defective product, for example, cannot ordinarily recover any losses incurred as a result. Instances where a duty of care is recognised generally involve the negligent performance of a service, or the negligent misstatements of professionals, which are then relied upon by others.

The development of pure economic loss stems from the case of Hedley Byrne & Co Ltd v Heller & Partners Ltd, where it was first recognised that a duty of care may arise not to cause economic loss to others through negligent misstatements. In this case, Hedley Byrne, an advertising agency, approached Heller & Partners for a credit check on a third company, Easipower Ltd, before carrying out advertising orders on their behalf. Heller & Partners reported that Easipower Ltd was credit-worthy, and in reliance on this statement, Hedley Byrne placed advertising orders for them. When subsequently Easipower Ltd was declared bankrupt, Hedley Byrne took legal action against Heller & Partners, alleging they had been owed a duty of care when consulting for a credit reference. Whilst Hedley Byrne did not succeed in their claim, (Note: The House of Lords finding that the disclaimer of the reference (that it had been given "without responsibility") precluded liability.) the House of Lords recognised that such a duty may be owed, where a relationship of reliance exists between two parties.

== Liability of public bodies ==
An organisation or public body may be found to have committed a negligent act in the same way that an individual may; however, for policy reasons, the duty of care which a public body may owe is different from that of private individuals or organisations. Generally, it is where the type of harm involved is not of a physical kind, or a negligent omission is committed, that the formulation of a duty of care differs.

Traditionally, courts have rejected claims that the police owe a duty of care to victims of crime. In Hill v Chief Constable of West Yorkshire, no duty of care was found to exist between the police and Jacqueline Hill, one of the victims of the Yorkshire Ripper. This lack of duty of care has been affirmed in a number of other cases both on the grounds of lack of proximity (a test required in all formulations of the doctrine of duty of care) and on the grounds of it being poor public policy.

In 2018, the Supreme Court of the United Kingdom found that the failure to properly investigate allegations of sexual assault against two women by John Worboys amounted to a breach of Article 3 of the European Convention of Human Rights, and that conspicuous or substantial errors in investigating serious crimes would give rise to similar breaches of human rights law. While this does not establish a duty of care under tort law, it does provide an alternative route to compensation for victims.

== See also ==
- English tort law
- Bhamra v Dubb [2010] EWCA Civ 13
- Floodgates principle

== Bibliography ==
- Bagshaw, Roderick; McBride, Nicholas (2008). Tort Law. Longman. ISBN 978-1-4058-5949-3.
- Deakin, Simon; Johnston, Angus; Markesinis, Basil (2007). Markesinis and Deakin's Tort Law. Oxford University Press. ISBN 978-0-19-928246-3.
- Elliott, Catherine; Quinn, Frances (2007). Tort Law. Longman. ISBN 978-1-4058-4672-1.
- Kidner, Richard (1987). "Resiling from the Anns principle: the variable nature of proximity in negligence". Legal Studies. 7 (3): 319–332. doi:10.1111/j.1748-121X.1987.tb00370.x. S2CID 109765942.
- Nolan, Donal (2004). "Psychiatric injury at the crossroads". Journal of Personal Injury Law (1).
- Steele, Jenny (2007). Tort Law: Text, Cases, & Materials: Text, Cases, and Materials (Paperback). Oxford University Press. ISBN 978-0-19-924885-8.
