= Paul v Royal Wolverhampton NHS Trust =

UK Supreme Court ruling on secondary victim claims

Paul & Anor v Royal Wolverhampton NHS Trust
- Court: Supreme Court of the United Kingdom
- Argued: 16–18 May 2023
- Decided: 11 January 2024
- Neutral citation: [2024] UKSC 1

Case history
- Prior history: [2022] EWCA Civ 12
- Appealed from: England and Wales Court of Appeal

Court membership
- Judges sitting: Lord Briggs, Lord Burrows, Lord Carloway, Lord Leggatt, Lord Richards, Lady Rose, Lord Sales

Keywords
- Clinical negligence; Duty of care; Insufficient proximity; Nervous shock; Psychiatric injury; Relevant event; Secondary victims; Violent external means

Area of law
- Law of Torts

Paul & Anor v Royal Wolverhampton NHS Trust [2024] UKSC 1 is a UK Supreme Court majority decision in which the court ruled (Note: deciding the appeals in the negative) that a duty of care was not owed by physicians to their patient's family members in order to prevent them from suffering harm as a result of witnessing the death, caused by medical negligence, (Note: irrespective of whether the doctor's negligence consisted of an act or an omission) of their relative. The court also found that psychiatric harm should not be treated any differently from physical harm in Tort Law. The judgment has significant implications for the confined area of medical negligence law involving the limited factors surrounding the claims of secondary victim onlookers in that they cannot generally (Note: A statutory exception exists in the Fatal Accidents Act 1976 where a partner or parents of the deceased are permitted to seek damages for bereavement, irrespective of dependency, although the damages are limited to a fixed award.) recover damages in cases of clinical negligence unless very specific criteria apply. On 11 January 2024, the Supreme Court dismissed the appeals by a majority decision of six-to-one.

== Background ==
There were three conjoined appeals which were dealt with together. Each appeal related to a secondary victim claim for psychiatric illness caused by viewing a traumatic event which was caused by negligence on the part of the respondent, which, in each case, was the Royal Wolverhampton NHS Trust. The question to be answered was whether a claim can be made for psychiatric injury when it is caused by directly observing a fatality, or other sufficiently horrifying incident, of a close family member which occurred as a result of prior clinical negligence?

In Paul, the two claimants were Mr Paul's two daughters, aged 9 and 12, who were present when he suffered a cardiac arrest and died in shocking circumstances. As a result of witnessing the distressing circumstances of their father's death, his two daughters were claiming damages for psychiatric illness.

In 2019, the claim's went before the High Court. However, the daughter's claims for damages for psychiatric injury were struck out by Master Cook. There was a period of over 14 months between Mr Paul's death and the original negligent incident and the court felt that it could not possibly be construed as the "relevant event" for deciding the essential question of proximity in order to establish liability under the accepted control mechanisms at that time.

In the case of Polmear, the claimants were the parents of Esmee Polmear who died as a result of undiagnosed pulmonary venoocclusive disease. The claimants witnessed the distressing circumstances of their young daughter's death and sought damages for post-traumatic stress disorder and major depression which they subsequently developed.

In the case of Purchase, the claimant, a mother, came upon her daughter in disturbing circumstances a few minutes after her death from severe pneumonia. The mother sought damages after having developed post-traumatic stress disorder and severe chronic anxiety and depression as a result of the distressing experience.

In all three cases, it was argued that the fatality was a result of clinical negligence on the part of the physician or health authority either by failing to recognise a life-threatening condition or not properly treating an existing one.

== Criteria for secondary claimants ==
...We are not able to accept that the responsibilities of a medical practitioner, and the purposes for which care is provided, extend to protecting members of the patient's close family from exposure to the traumatic experience of witnessing the death or manifestation of disease or injury in their relative. To impose such a responsibility on hospitals and doctors would go beyond what, in the current state of our society, is reasonably regarded as the nature and scope of their role.

— Lord Leggatt and Lady Rose, BAILII transcript

The Supreme Court followed the criteria which evolved from three significant cases concerning claims for psychiatric illness: McLoughlin v O'Brian, Alcock v Chief Constable of South Yorkshire Police and Frost v Chief Constable of South Yorkshire.

However, the outcome in Paul serves to reaffirm (Note: Alcock was reaffirmed by majority, rejecting any slackening in the criteria on liability.) and tighten up the control mechanism established in Alcock v Chief Constable of South Yorkshire Police. The "Alcock test", arose from the liability of the police for the nervous shock suffered in consequence of the events of the Hillsborough disaster and set the stringent criteria for a claimant to be considered a secondary victim in psychiatric injury claims, even though the common law does not usually permit compensation for the harmful effects of losing a loved one.

The limited circumstances treated as requirements for successful secondary claims are:

- That the defendant owed a duty of care to the secondary victim to prevent them from being harmed by witnessing the "death, injury or imperilment" of the primary victim;
- That the defendant must have been reasonably capable of foreseeing (Note: Reasonable foreseeability of harm, by itself, is not sufficient to give rise to a duty of care.) that the claimant could develop a recognised psychiatric illness due to the negligence which led to the primary victim's "death, injury or imperilment";

The following four factors deal specifically with the required proximity:

- The secondary claimant must have close ties "of love and affection" with the primary person killed, injured or imperilled;
- There must be sufficient proximity to the primary victim's incident or accident (Note: An unexpected and unintended event which caused injury (or a risk of injury) to the primary victim by violent external means.) in both time and space;
- The secondary claimant must have directly witnessed the incident, accident or its immediate aftermath, rather than having heard about it some other way;
- The secondary claimant must have developed a recognised psychiatric illness as a direct result of having perceived the incident, accident, or its immediate aftermath

== Dissenting opinion ==
Lord Burrows was the sole dissenter arguing that the appeals in the three conjoined cases should be allowed. He was critical of the majority decision in that the requirements could have been construed more broadly, in that he counterargued that the claimants should have been allowed to succeed because the requirement of foreseeability and the proximity control factors were all satisfied and that he considered the "relevant event" in the three cases should be taken as the death of the primary victim. Lord Burrows felt that the emphasis on external events of accidents in relation to the primary victim should shift to instead concentrate on the death of the primary victim as the relevant event in each of the three claims.

== Significance ==
In arriving at the ruling, the Supreme Court in effect reviewed, refined and confirmed the historic decisions on secondary victim claims to determine if the earlier criteria and mechanisms had been interpreted and applied correctly. Various tests for limiting secondary claims were considered and rejected as unacceptable. The court did not accept that it was a reasonable societal norm to expect the medical profession to be obligated to prevent any close relatives being harmed by observing the distressing death of their loved one.

The ruling also clarified that the accident witnessed by the secondary claimant did not need to amount to a sufficiently "horrifying event" or that it had to reach the threshold of causing a "sudden shock to the nervous system".

An article of 8 February 2024 in The British Journal of Nursing noted that the decision took into account the Supreme Court's awareness of the need to avoiding opening the floodgates of litigation, that a wider ambit would increase the number of claims in situations where a "general duty" existed to shield secondary victims from psychiatric harm. In circumstances where the primary victim's death could have been averted by medical interventions given more timeously, the ruling still applies that there is no duty on medical professionals to protect the patient's relatives from the harmful witnessing of any negligent actions or from the adverse effects of the failure to diagnose a condition.

The judgement was not well received by lawyers acting for claimants. It was reported in the Law Society's Gazette on 17 January 2024 that the ruling had caused "despair and consternation" among legal professionals who felt "genuine embarrassment at the state of the law". One solicitor firm reported that due to the outcome of Paul, they were required to notify some of their clients, mainly fathers with active neonatal death claims, that their claims could not be progressed.

On 11 March 2025, the decision in Paul was cited in a High Court judgment handed down by Senior Master Cook, where the limiting scope of secondary victim claims was referred to in the context of the Final Report of the Infected Blood Inquiry Response Expert Group (Note: The expert group summary report made reference to Recommendation 8 of Sir Brian Langstaff's Second Interim Report of 5 April 2023 concerning tariff based compensation and the taking into account of other rates but not being limited by them, and that the ruling in Paul v Wolverhampton NHST [2024] UKSC 1 was disregarded because it was decided after the report was published and because it had been proposed (in Recommendation 8) that the tariffs being established would broadly take into account, but not be limited by, the practice of the UK courts at that time.) published on 16 August 2024. Had Paul v Wolverhampton NHST been followed by the Expert Group, many "affected persons" (Note: The "affected" refers to the cohort linked to the infected person, either by their familial relationship which includes partners, children, parents, and siblings, or as someone providing care who has been affected.) would not be able to claim compensation in their own right as secondary victim claimants due to Paul significantly narrowing the circumstances where such claims would succeed.
