= Esso Petroleum Co Ltd v Comrs of Customs and Excise =

Esso Ltd v Customs and Excise
- Court: House of Lords
- Full case name: Esso Petroleum Company Limited (Respondents) v. Commissioners of Customs and Excise (Appellants)
- Decided: 10 December 1975
- Citations: [1975] UKHL 4, [1976] 1 WLR 1

Case history
- Prior action: [1975] 1 WLR 406

Court membership
- Judges sitting: Lord Wilberforce, Viscount Dilhorne, Lord Simon, Lord Fraser, Lord Russell

Case opinions
- Lord Dilhorne, Lord Simon, Lord Fraser, Lord Russell

Keywords
- Intention to create legal relations

Esso Petroleum Co Ltd v Commissioners of Customs and Excise [1975] UKHL 4 is an English contract law case, concerning the rule of creation of legal relations in English law.

== Facts ==
Esso offered a World Cup coin with likenesses of the England 1970 squad players, given to every motorist buying over four gallons of petrol. HM Customs & Excise argued these coins should have purchase tax charged on them because they were ‘produced in quantity for general sale.’

== Judgment ==
=== Court of Appeal ===
Lord Denning MR said it was amazing that this case had got so far. He said the coins were not 'sold'.

=== House of Lords ===
The House of Lords (Lord Fraser dissenting) agreed with the Court of Appeal that the petrol, not the coins, was being sold. But, then, on the question of whether the coins were being given under a contractual obligation, or as a mere gift, Lord Simon of Glaisdale, Lord Wilberforce and Lord Fraser agreed there was intention to create legal relations, given the heavy onus of proof to show a bargain was not intended. Lord Russell and Viscount Dilhorne dissented on this point, saying that the language in the poster advertisements that the coins were 'going free' and the minimal value of the coins indicated no intention to create legal relations.

== See also ==
- English contract law
