= Ingrid Simler, Lady Simler =

British judge (born 1963)

The Right Honourable Lady Simler DBE
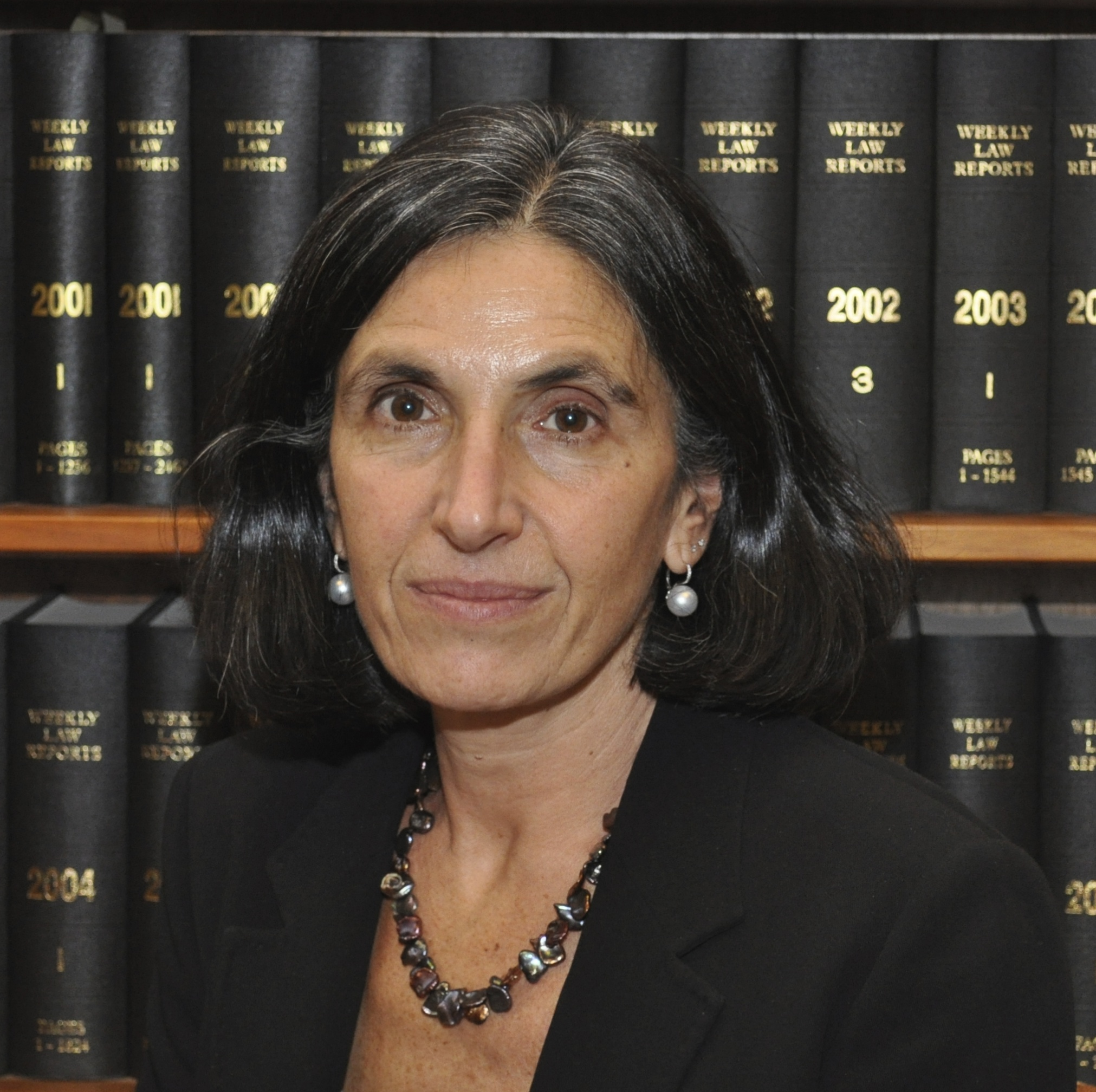

Justice of the Supreme Court of the United Kingdom
- Incumbent
- Assumed office 14 November 2023
- Nominated by: Alex Chalk
- Appointed by: Charles III
- Preceded by: Lord Kitchin

Lady Justice of Appeal
- In office 2019–2023

Justice of the High Court
- In office 2013–2019

Personal details
- Born: 17 September 1963 (age 63)
- Education: Sidney Sussex College, Cambridge; University of Amsterdam

Ingrid Ann Simler, Lady Simler, DBE, PC (born 17 September 1963) is a Justice of the Supreme Court of the United Kingdom. She was previously a judge of the Court of Appeal of England and Wales.

== Career ==
Born to a Jewish family, she was educated at Henrietta Barnett School, Sidney Sussex College, Cambridge and the University of Amsterdam.

She was called to the bar by Inner Temple in 1987 and became a QC in 2006. Simler was appointed a Recorder in 2002 and was a judge of the High Court of Justice (Queen's Bench Division) from 2013. She was President of the Employment Appeal Tribunal for a term of three years from 1 January 2016 to 31 December 2018.

On 27 June 2018, it was announced that Simler was to be appointed to the Court of Appeal, an appointment she took up on 2 July 2019.

Simler was chair of the Equality and Diversity Committee of the Bar Council, and at the date of announcement of her appointment to the High Court bench in 2013 she was head of her chambers. She is the chair of the Equality, Diversity and Inclusion sub-committee of the Inner Temple.

On 17 October 2023, the Ministry of Justice announced that Simler would become a Justice of the Supreme Court of the United Kingdom. She was sworn in on 14 November 2023.

In November 2024, Simler was appointed as the Visitor of St Hugh's College, Oxford, succeeding Simon Brown, Baron Brown of Eaton-under-Heywood.

== Personal life ==
She married John Bernstein in 1991, and has two sons and two daughters.

== List of decided cases ==
- Mercer v Alternative Future Group Ltd [2024] UKSC 12
- Kostal UK Ltd v Dunkley [2018] ICR 768 (EAT)
- For Women Scotland Ltd v The Scottish Ministers [2025] UKSC 4
