= Lewisham rail crash =

1957 train wreck in Lewisham, London, England

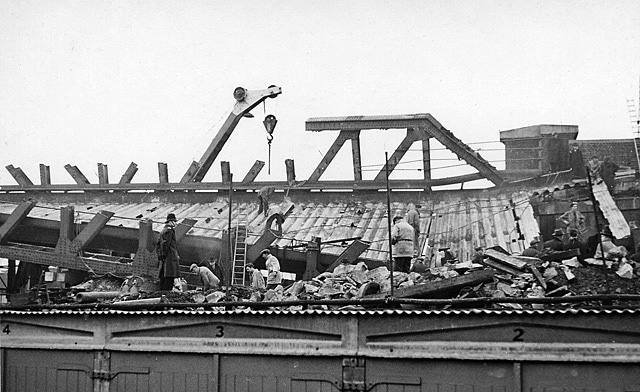
- The rail-over-rail bridge being dismantled
- Interactive map of the location

Details
- Date: 4 December 1957
- Location: near St Johns
- Coordinates: 51°28′03.3″N 0°01′09.3″W
- Country: England
- Line: South Eastern Main Line
- Operator: Southern Region
- Owner: British Railways
- Incident type: Collision in fog
- Cause: Signal passed at danger

Statistics
- Trains: 2
- Deaths: 90
- Injured: 173

On the evening of 4 December 1957, two trains crashed in dense fog on the South Eastern Main Line near Lewisham in south-east London, causing the deaths of 90 people and injuring 173. An electric train to Hayes had stopped at a signal under a rail bridge, and the following steam train to Ramsgate crashed into it, destroying a carriage and causing the bridge to collapse onto the steam train. The bridge had to be completely removed; it was over a week before the lines under the bridge were reopened, and another month before the bridge was rebuilt and traffic allowed over it.

The driver of the Ramsgate train was acquitted of manslaughter charges after two trials. The Ministry of Transport report found that he had failed to slow down after passing two caution signals, so he was unable to stop at the danger signal, concluding that the use of an Automatic Warning System would have prevented the collision.

== Collision ==
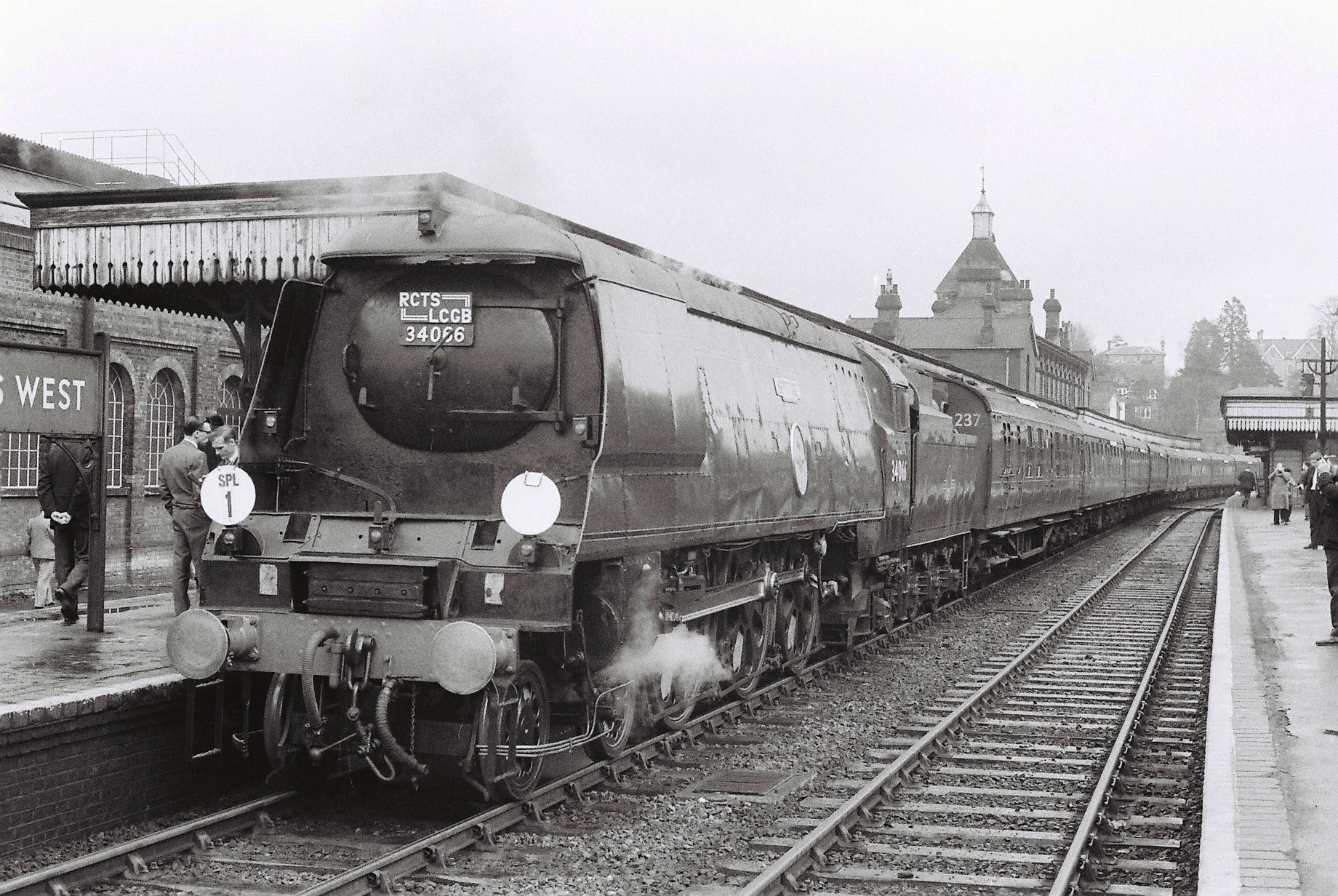
Battle of Britain class 34066, "Spitfire", one of the locomotives involved, seen in 1964

On the evening of Wednesday 4 December 1957 there was heavy fog in the London area, and trains were running late. The 5:18 pm Charing Cross-to-Hayes service, comprising electric multiple units totalling 10 carriages and carrying nearly 1,500 passengers, stopped at a danger signal at Parks Bridge Junction on the South Eastern Main Line, under a bridge carrying rail tracks over the line. Trains were running out of sequence because of the fog, and the Parks Bridge Junction signalman wished to speak to the driver by the telephone at the signal in order to confirm the train's identity and destination. At approximately 6:20 pm it was struck from behind by a train from Cannon Street to Ramsgate via Folkestone, consisting of Battle of Britain Class 4-6-2 no. 34066 Spitfire, hauling 11 coaches carrying about 700 passengers and travelling at about 30 miles per hour (48 km/h). While the rearmost two carriages of the Hayes train sustained moderate damage, the eighth coach was telescoped and destroyed by the ninth coach. The collision also threw the tender and leading coach of the Ramsgate train off the track, dislodging a pier of the bridge, causing it to fall and crush two coaches. Two minutes later, a train due to pass over the bridge stopped short, although its leading coach was tilted.

There were 90 fatalities and a large number of people were taken to hospital, of whom 109 were admitted. To this day it is the third-worst railway accident in the United Kingdom, surpassed only by Harrow and Wealdstone (1952) and Quintinshill (1915).

== Aftermath ==
The first emergency response arrived at 6:25 pm with the fire brigade, ambulance and police being assisted by doctors and nurses. Help was accepted from The Salvation Army, the Women's Voluntary Service, St John Ambulance Brigade and local residents. By 10:30 pm all of the injured had been taken to hospital.

All four of the running lines under the bridge and the two over it were blocked. At St Johns station, just north of the bridge, the North Kent line diverges; however, during the rescue this needed to be closed and the traction current switched off. An emergency timetable began at 6:10 am the following day, with local trains travelling through Lewisham, avoiding the accident, and main line services diverted to Victoria, another London terminus.

At 4:00 pm on 9 December, the trains and the fallen bridge had been cut up and removed. The track then had to be relaid and the lines under the bridge were reopened at 5:00 am on 12 December. A temporary bridge was built and the overhead line was reopened at 6:00 am on 13 January.

== Coroner's inquest and trial ==
The jury at the inquest declared by majority that the deaths were due to gross negligence, but the coroner rejected the verdict and substituted one of accidental death. The driver of the Ramsgate train was then tried for manslaughter, but the jury could not reach a verdict. He was acquitted at a second trial.

== Civil action for psychological injury ==
Henry Chadwick, a member of the public who assisted at the accident, successfully sued the British Railways Board for the "nervous shock" he experienced. The case, Chadwick v British Railways Board, an important precedent for 30 years, was partly overruled by White v Chief Constable of South Yorkshire, 1999 2 A.C. 455.

== Report ==
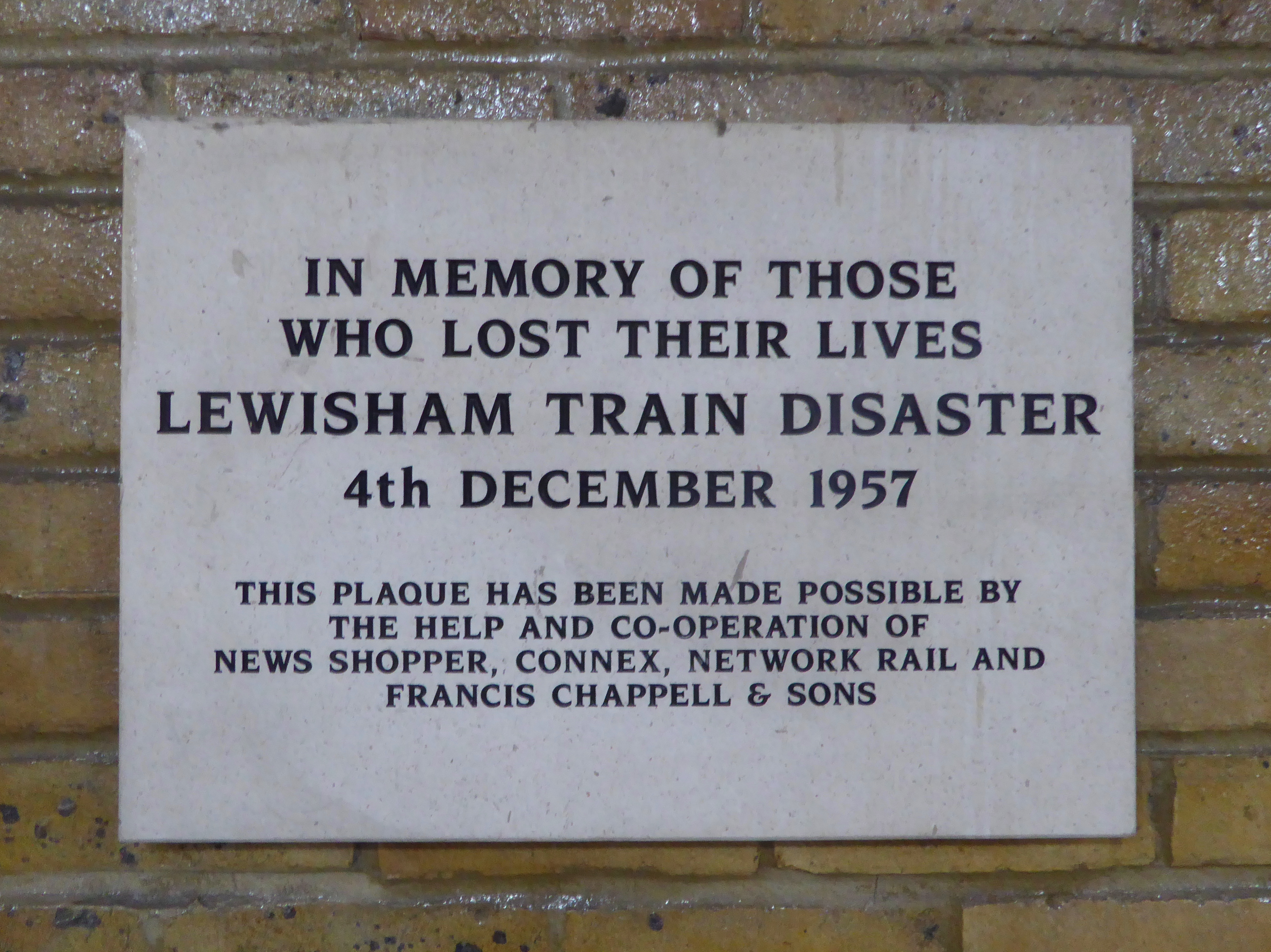
Memorial to the train crash on the wall of the station

The Ministry of Transport report on the collision was published on 24 July 1958. Witnesses were interviewed, the visibility of the signals on the line examined, and tests showed no fault in the signalling equipment. The report found that the driver had not slowed for two caution signals, and applied the brakes only after the fireman had called to him that he had passed a danger signal. Although he had poor visibility of signals from the driver's seat, he did not cross over to see them, or ask the fireman to look for them.

The report concluded that an "Automatic Train Control of the Warning type" would have prevented the collision. Although installation had been agreed after the Harrow and Wealdstone rail crash in 1952, priority was being given to main-line routes controlled by semaphore signals. The poor visibility of signals from the steam locomotive, Battle of Britain class No. 34066, was mentioned with a recommendation that they be fitted with wider windscreens.

== Legacy ==
The collapsed bridge was replaced by a temporary military trestle structure, still in use.

A plaque at Lewisham railway station commemorates the accident.

== See also ==
- Granville rail disaster: 84 killed – Australia's worst rail disaster, poor track maintenance causes derailment of a train and subsequent collapse of a bridge in Granville, New South Wales on 18 January 1977.
