= Page v Smith =

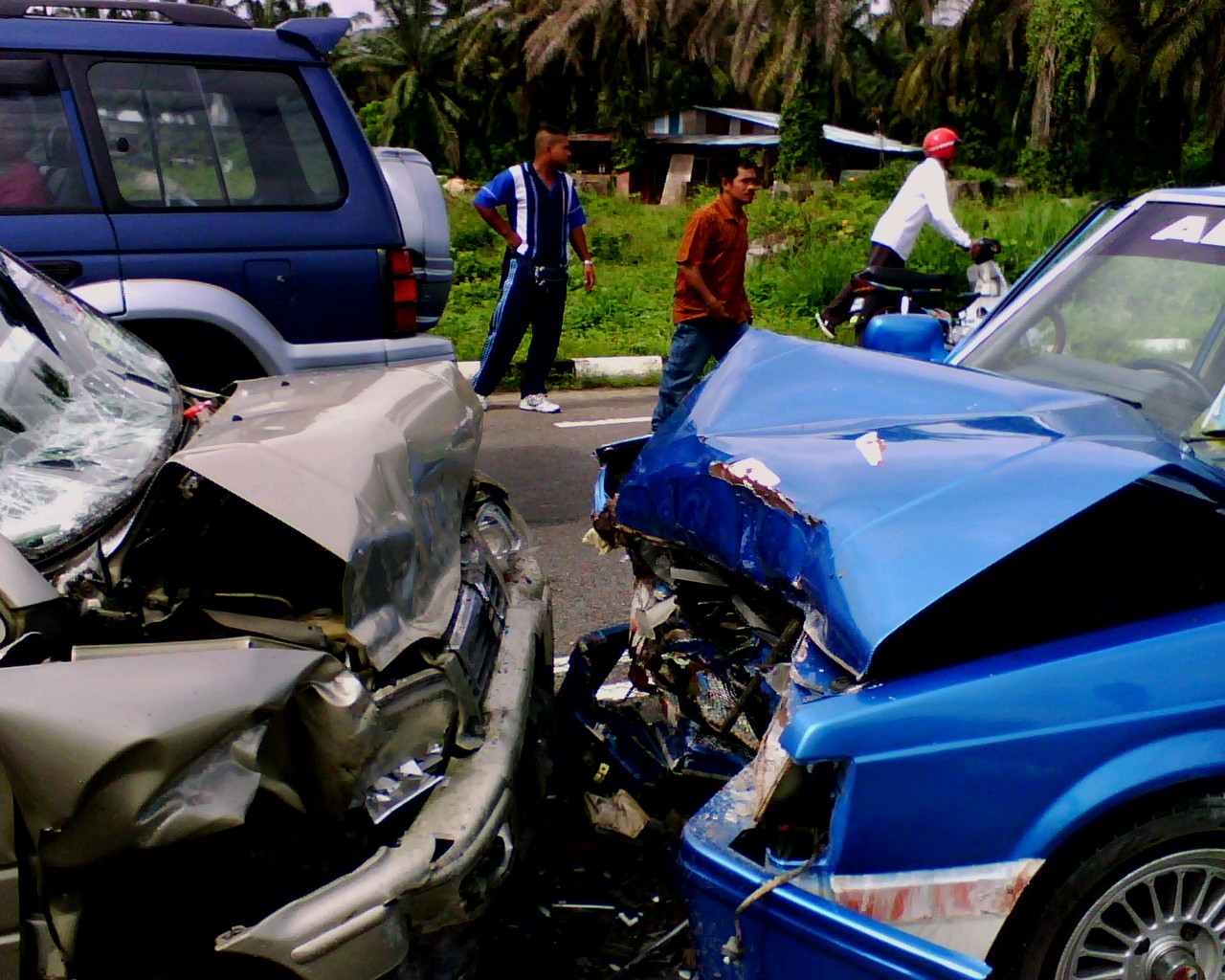
- Court: House of Lords
- Full case name: Page v Smith
- Decided: 11 May 1995
- Citation: [1995] 2 WLR 644, [1995] UKHL 7
- Transcript: Full text of judgment

Court membership
- Judges sitting: Lord Keith of Kinkel; Lord Ackner; Lord Jauncey of Tullichettle; Lord Browne-Wilkinson; Lord Lloyd of Berwick

Keywords
- nervous shock; foreseeability

Page v Smith [1995] UKHL 7 is a decision of the House of Lords. It is part of the common law of England and Wales.

The case concerns foreseeability of psychiatric damage and creates an important distinction between primary and secondary victims in the English law of negligence relating to the recovery of such damage.

== Facts ==
The plaintiff, Mr Page, was involved in a minor car accident, and was physically unhurt in the collision. However the crash did result in a recurrence of myalgic encephalomyelitis/chronic fatigue syndrome from which he had suffered for 20 years but was then in remission. The defendant admitted that he had been negligent, but said he was not liable for the psychiatric damage as it was unforeseeable and therefore not recoverable as a head of damage.

== Judgment ==
The leading judgment was given by Lord Lloyd of Berwick who, following from the factual distinction made by Lord Oliver in Alcock v Chief Constable of South Yorkshire, held that Mr Page was a primary victim. Mr Page had been directly involved in the accident, and therefore his case was of a different nature than those that had come previously before the House of Lords. His Lordship held that this factual distinction also had legal consequences, those being that the restrictions that were put in place in order to limit the extent of the defendant's duty to secondary victims, did not apply to Mr Page's case. Therefore, it did not have to be shown that nervous shock or psychiatric injury needed to be a foreseeable consequence of what happened - Mr Page only had to show that a personal injury (describing a broader type of damage) was a foreseeable consequence.

In the case of direct victims, their Lordships said the following test should be applied: "Could the defendant reasonably foresee that his conduct would expose the plaintiff to the risk of personal injury, psychological or physical?" If the answer was yes, it would be irrelevant that the extent of the damage was unforeseeable because the plaintiff had special sensitivities - the rule founded in other nervous shock cases that the plaintiff should be of reasonable fortitude was found to be irrelevant. This is based on the eggshell skull rule, that is, one "takes the plaintiff as one finds him". Consequently, the defendant was found liable for the nervous shock suffered by Mr Page.

The majority judgment has been critically received by most academics. The minority followed the decision of the Court of Appeal, finding that in all cases of psychiatric injury the test in establishing a duty of care was whether the kind of damage (psychiatric damage) was foreseeable and not just whether or not it was foreseeable that harm (of any type) might come to the plaintiff. This is to be judged ex post facto, taking into account what actually happened. When establishing a duty, the plaintiff's unusual susceptibility is of relevance to the question of duty - once it is established that the type of damage (nervous shock) is foreseeable, then the 'eggshell personality' rule comes into operation, and the exact nature and extent of that damage need not have been foreseeable.

The minority found that in the circumstances - a moderate collision where neither Mr Page or Mr Smith and his passengers suffered any physical injuries and where vehicular damage was only moderate - that nervous shock was not foreseeable. It does not follow that whenever there is physical injury that psychiatric injury will be foreseeable, therefore, the test is based on the type of damage.

The rule created in Page v Smith was later restricted (Rothwell v Chemical & Insulating Co) to apply only to cases where the complainant suffers psychiatric illness as an immediate result of the incident - a mere endangerment resulting in worry which later turns into psychiatric illness does not suffice.

== See also ==
- Nervous shock (English Law)
