= McLoughlin v O'Brian =

1983 English tort law case

- Court: House of Lords
- Full case name: McLoughlin (married woman) A.P. (appelland) v O'Brian and others (respondents)
- Decided: 6 May 1982
- Citation: [1983] 1 AC 410, [1983] 1 AC 410, [1982] 2 All ER 298, [1982] UKHL 3, [1982] 2 WLR 982
- Transcript: Full text of judgment

Court membership
- Judges sitting: Lord Wilberforce, Lord Edmund-Davies, Lord Russell of Killowen, Lord Scarman, Lord Bridge of Harwich

Keywords
- Negligence, psychiatric harm, proximity

McLoughlin v O'Brian [1983] 1 AC 410 is an English tort law case, decided by the House of Lords, dealing with the possibility of recovering for psychiatric harm suffered as a result of an accident in which one's family was involved.

== Facts ==
On 19 October 1973, a friend came to the plaintiff's house to tell her of a serious accident, involving her husband and three children, two hours after it had occurred. He drove her to the hospital where she was told one child was dead, and saw her husband and two other children seriously injured, covered in oil and mud. She suffered serious nervous shock as a result and sued the defendant who was responsible for the accident.

Earlier decisions in English courts had allowed victims to recover damages for psychiatric injury sustained as a result of witnessing the imperilment of a loved one, but only where the claimant was actually present at the scene. This case was unique at the time because the claimant suffered injuries away from the scene of the accident and hours after the accident occurred.

This case is frequently examined by law students and students of legal philosophy. Legal scholar Ronald Dworkin used the case as subject matter in a hypothetical case examined by a fictional, ideal judge named Hercules in his book Law's Empire.

== Trial judgment ==
The trial judge held that the defendants owed duty of care to the claimant as she saw her husband and children covered in oil and blood as a result of the accident. She suffered psychiatric injury, including clinical depression and personality changes, after witnessing her family's situation in the hospital. The trial ruled for McLoughlin.

== Court of Appeal judgment ==
The Court of Appeal rejected O'Brien's appeal, who appealed on the basis that the claim ought to be barred as a matter of public policy. The Court found the injury was foreseeable, and a duty of care was owed to McLoughlin. However, the Court of Appeal did not allow McLoughlin to recover damages. Stephenson LJ held that the consequence of breach should be limited as a matter of policy. Griffiths LJ held that the defendants had only a limited duty of care (e.g. only towards persons near the road who were directly affected), and that foreseeable consequences did not automatically impose a duty of care.

The Court also held that only legislature should extend the scope of liability.

== House of Lords judgment ==
The House of Lords found in favour of McLoughlin by 5-0, and determined that the nervous shock suffered by McLoughlin was reasonably foreseeable and that policy considerations should not inhibit a decision in her favour.

Lord Wilberforce delivered the leading speech and laid out the test for recovery of damages for personal injury resulting from nervous shock. First, a close familial relationship must exist between claimant and victim (the Court disqualified an ordinary bystander). Second, the claimant must be in close proximity to the accident "in both time and place"; this includes witnesses of the immediate aftermath of the accident. Third, and last, the shock suffered by the claimant must "come through sight or hearing of the event, or of its immediate aftermath". Lords Wilberforce and Scarman both noted the influence of the leading American case on this issue, Dillon v. Legg (1968).

== See also ==
- English tort law
- Nervous shock (English Law)
