= Vosburg v. Putney =

American torts case on the eggshell plaintiff rule

- Court: Supreme Court of Wisconsin
- Full case name: VOSBURG, by guardian ad litem, Respondent, vs. PUTNEY, by guardian ad litem, Appellant
- Decided: November 17, 1891
- Citation: 80 Wis. 523; 50 N.W. 403 Wisc. (Wisc. 1891) Second Appeal

Case history
- Prior action: 78 Wis. 84; 47 N.W. 99 (Wisc. 1890) First Appeal

Court membership
- Judge sitting: Lyon (2nd Appeal) Orton (1st Appeal)

Case opinions
- 1. Sustained (yes); 2. Remand, granting new trial.; 3. Sustained (yes)
- Decision by: Lyon

Vosburg v. Putney, 80 Wis. 523, 50 N.W. 403 (Wisc. 1891), was an American torts case that helped establish the scope of liability in a battery with plaintiffs who are particularly vulnerable known as the eggshell skull rule. The case involved an incident where a schoolboy kicked another schoolboy in the leg without knowing the victim was already injured, causing the boy to suffer permanent damage to his leg. The case has been labeled as "one of the most studied cases in American law" after its decision in 1891.

== Background ==
On July 1, 1887, 12-year-old Andrew Vosburg of Delafield, Wisconsin, cut his left knee while wielding an axe. His injury was so severe that Vosburg was confined to his bed for 4-6 weeks. He returned to school until his family sold their farm and moved to Waukesha, Wisconsin in December.

On February 20, 1889, 11-year-old George Putney playfully kicked 14-year-old Andrew Vosburg in the upper shin by while the two were in their school's classroom. Although the kick was very light, unbeknownst to Putney, Vosburg had already injured his left leg and was still recovering. Vosburg did not feel the kick, but moments later felt violent pain in his shin. Putney's kick exacerbated Vosburg's original injury, causing him to suffer extreme pain, illness, swelling, and develop a serious infection requiring physicians to operate in order to drain pus and excise bone at the site of the injury. Vosburg required two surgeries to treat his injured leg and was left with a weakness in his leg for the rest of his life, as the bone there degenerated past saving.

Vosburg sued Putney for assault and battery. In the first trial, the court found for Vosburg and awarded him $2800 in damages. Putney appealed, and the original case was remanded with an order for a new trial. In the second trial, the jury awarded Vosburg $2500 in compensatory damages. Putney appealed on one part of the second trial's verdict: whether he intended to do Vosburg any harm.

Ultimately, the case came before the Supreme Court of Wisconsin three times.

== Judgment ==
Vosburg exemplifies the common law eggshell skull rule. This case also illustrates the well-settled proposition that the tortfeasor must take his victim as he finds him. Material omissions in the statement of facts in a hypothetical question will render it inadmissible. The fact that the plaintiff is more susceptible to injury does not mitigate a defendant's liability.

The court found that although Putney never intended to cause Vosburg any harm, Putney could still be liable for the full extent of Vosburg's injuries. The court considered the issues of material omissions in the statement of facts, intent to do harm, and the amount of recoverable damages.

Judgment was reversed, and the case was remanded for a new trial because of error in a ruling on an objection to certain testimony

== Aftermath ==
Andrew Vosburg suffered lasting complications with his leg and had to wear a leg brace for the rest of his life, but otherwise Vosburg was able to lead a normal life. He was hired by the Milwaukee Electric Railroad and Light Company in 1900 and eventually rose to foreman. He married and had three children. He and his wife also made a living by buying, refurbishing, and selling homes. Vosburg died in 1938 at the age of 64.

George Putney enrolled in the University of Wisconsin but left during his sophomore year and returned to Waukesha where he worked at his family's store. He later married and moved to Milwaukee where he became a clothing and car salesman. He died in 1940.

== Sources ==
- Allison H. Eid, Epsteinian Torts: Richard A. Epstein, Cases and Materials on Torts, 25 SEATTLE U. L. REV. 89 (2001).
- Dobbs, Dan B., Paul T. Hayden, and Ellen M. Bublick. Torts and compensation: Personal accountability and social responsibility for injury. St. Paul, MN: Thomson/West, 2009.
- Epstein, Richard A.; Sharkey, Catherine (2016). Cases and Materials on Torts. Aspen Casebook Series (11th ed.). New York: Wolters Kluwer. ISBN 978-1-4548-6825-5.
- Farnsworth, Ward, and Mark F. Grady. Torts: Cases and questions. Austin: Wolters Kluwer Law & Business, 2009.
- Friedman, David D. Law's order: What economics has to do with law and why it matters. Princeton, NJ: Princeton UP, 2000.
