= Crumbling skull rule =

Legal doctrine on pre-existing condition liability

The crumbling skull rule is a legal doctrine used in the Canadian tort law system, primarily in the field of Indigenous Peoples litigation in the context of residential schools. It holds that where a plaintiff had a condition or injury that predates the tort and would have naturally deteriorated or worsened over time (e.g. a crumbling skull), the defendant is not responsible to the degree that the condition or injury would have naturally worsened over time. A defendant is only liable for the degree the injury was worsened or the hastening or acceleration of the damage caused by the tort. The crumbling skull rule should not be confused with the related thin skull rule.. However, if the tortfeasor knowingly takes advantage of the victim's pre-existing condition for his own gain, then the crumbling skull doctrine cannot be applied.

The concept is sometimes applied without specific reference to the crumbling skull rule, instead being expressed as a non-absolute application of the thin skull rule.
