= Bourhill v Young =

- Court: House of Lords
- Decided: 5 August 1942
- Citation: [1943] AC 92
- Transcript: judgment

Keywords
- Remoteness of damage

Bourhill v Young [1943] AC 92 (also titled Hay v Young) is a Scottish delict case, on the subject of how extensive an individual's duty is to ensure others are not harmed by their activities. The case established important boundaries on the scope of recovery for bystanders, or those uninvolved with physical harm. Where a woman suffered psychiatric harm after walking onto the scene of a motorcycle accident, she was deemed not to be a foreseeable victim, having not been in immediate danger of physical harm.

== Facts ==
On 11 October 1938, Mr Young had been negligently riding a motorcycle along a road, and was involved in a collision with a car, fatally injuring him. At the time of the crash, Mrs Bourhill was about to leave a tram which she had been riding, around 15 meters from the scene of the accident. Mrs Bourhill heard the crash, commenting "I just got in a pack of nerves, and I did not know whether I was going to get it or not." Following the removal of Mr Young's body from the road, she approached the scene of the accident, seeing the blood remaining from the crash. Mrs Bourhill, at the time eight months pregnant, later gave birth to a stillborn child, and claimed she had suffered nervous shock, stress, and sustained loss due to Mr Young.

== Judgment ==
In order to succeed in her claim, Mrs Bourhill had to establish a duty of care had been owed to her by Mr Young. To find such a duty, the claimant must be foreseeable, or proximate to the scene of the accident. The House of Lords denied that Mrs Bourhill had been foreseeable to Mr Young, at the time of the accident. Lord Russell stated:

Can it be said that John Young could reasonably have anticipated that a person, situated as was the appellant, would be affected by his proceeding towards Colinton at the speed at which he was travelling? I think not. His road was clear of pedestrians. The appellant was not within his vision, but was standing behind the solid barrier of the tramcar. His speed in no way endangered her. In these circumstances I am unable to see how he could reasonably anticipate that, if he came into collision with a vehicle coming across the tramcar into Glenlockhart Road, the resultant noise would cause physical injury by shock to a person standing behind the tramcar. In my opinion, he owed no duty to the appellant, and was, therefore, not guilty of any negligence in relation to her.
