= Tony Lloyd, Baron Lloyd of Berwick =

British judge (1929–2024)

The Right Honourable The Lord Lloyd of Berwick PC DL
- Lloyd's valedictory speech in 2015

Lord of Appeal in Ordinary
- In office 1 October 1993 – 31 December 1998
- Monarch: Elizabeth II
- Preceded by: The Lord Griffiths
- Succeeded by: The Lord Phillips of Worth Matravers

Member of the House of Lords
- Lord Temporal
- Lord of Appeal in Ordinary; 1 October 1993 – 27 March 2015

Personal details
- Born: Anthony John Leslie Lloyd; 9 May 1929
- Died: 8 December 2024 (aged 95)
- Spouse: Jane Helen Violet Shelford (m. 1960)
- Education: Eton College
- Alma mater: Trinity College, Cambridge
- Occupation: Judge
- Profession: Law

Military service
- Allegiance: United Kingdom
- Branch/service: British Army
- Years of service: 1948–1953
- Rank: Lieutenant
- Unit: Coldstream Guards

Anthony John Leslie Lloyd, Baron Lloyd of Berwick, PC, DL (9 May 1929 – 8 December 2024) was a British judge and a member of the House of Lords.

== Early life and education ==
Lloyd was born on 9 May 1929, the son of Edward John Boydell Lloyd and Leslie Johnston Fleming. He was educated at Eton College, where he was a King's Scholar. After serving in the British Army, Lloyd studied law at Trinity College, Cambridge. He was admitted to the Inner Temple as a barrister in 1955.

== Military service ==
On 27 November 1948, Lloyd was commissioned into the Coldstream Guards as a second lieutenant. On 27 September 1949, he transferred to the Regular Army Reserve of Officers as a second lieutenant with seniority from 1 January 1949; this ended his full-time military service. He was promoted to lieutenant on 3 August 1950. He relinquished his British Army commission on 9 December 1953.

== Career ==
Lloyd was a barrister and "took silk" as a Queen's Counsel in 1967. In 1969 he was appointed Attorney-General to the Prince of Wales, serving until 1977. In 1978, he was appointed High Court Judge of the Queen's Bench, serving until 1983. In 1984, he was appointed Lord Justice of Appeal, serving until 1993, and made a Privy Counsellor. From 1985 to 1992 he was the Interception of Communications Commissioner. On 1 October 1993, he was appointed Lord of Appeal in Ordinary (a "Law Lord"), serving until his resignation on 31 December 1998. He wrote the leading judgment in the case of Page v Smith (1995).

In 1993 he wrote a letter in support of Bishop Peter Ball, who was later convicted of child sexual abuse. He chaired the special committee on the proposed Speakership of the House of Lords. In 1996, he conducted a review of British laws against terrorism; his report, Inquiry Into Legislation Against Terrorism, was issued in October 1996. He was a member of the Court of Ecclesiastical Causes Reserved. In 2005 he became chairman of the parliamentary Ecclesiastical Committee which examines draft measures presented to it by the Legislative Committee of the General Synod of the Church of England. On 27 March 2015, he retired from the House of Lords.

== Personal life and death ==
In 1960, he married Jane Helen Violet Shelford, the daughter of Cornelius William Shelford. Lloyd died at home on 8 December 2024, at the age of 95.

== Honours ==
When appointed to Queen's Bench in 1978, he was made a Knight Bachelor. When appointed Lord of Appeal in Ordinary in 1993, he was raised to the House of Lords with the title Baron Lloyd of Berwick, of Ludlay in the County of East Sussex. He held the office of deputy lieutenant (D.L.) of East Sussex in 1983. As a leading barrister, he held several honorary posts at the Inner Temple: Bencher in 1976, Reader in 1998 and 1999, and Treasurer in 1999.

== Arms ==
Coat of arms of Tony Lloyd, Baron Lloyd of Berwick
Coronet Coronet of a Baron Crest A Hedgehog Gules, spined Or, holding in the dexter paw an Ostrich Plume erect proper. Escutcheon Per fess Gules and Or, a Pale per fess and a Fess per fess, in chief an Escallop between two Hedgehogs, and in base a Hedgehog between two Escallops, all counter-changed. Motto NISI DOMINUS (Only the Lord)
