= Nervous shock =

Concept in English law

In English law, a nervous shock is a psychiatric / mental illness or injury inflicted upon a person by intentional or negligent actions or omissions of another. Often it is a psychiatric disorder triggered by witnessing an accident, for example an injury caused to one's parents or spouse. Although the term "nervous shock" has been described as "inaccurate" and "misleading", it continues to be applied as a useful abbreviation for a complex concept. The possibility of recovering damages for nervous shock, particularly caused by negligence, is strongly limited in English law.

== Definition ==
To amount in law to "nervous shock", the psychiatric damage suffered by the claimant must extend beyond grief or emotional distress to a recognised mental illness, such as anxiety neurosis or reactive depression. Damages for bereavement suffered as a result of the wrongful death of a close one are available under the Fatal Accidents Act 1976, while courts can also award damages for "pain and suffering" as a result of physical injury.

== Intentionally inflicted nervous shock ==
It is well established in English law that a person who has intentionally and without good reason caused another emotional distress will be liable for any psychiatric injury that follows. An example of this is a bad practical joke played on someone which triggered serious depression in that person, the other person emotional distress and will be liable for the medical consequences.

== Negligently inflicted nervous shock ==
Before a claimant can recover damages for the nervous shock which he suffered as a result of the defendant's negligence, he must prove all of the elements of the tort of negligence:

1. The existence of a duty of care, i.e. the duty on the part of the defendant not to inflict nervous shock upon the claimant;
2. A breach of that duty, i.e. the defendant's actions or omissions in those circumstances fell below what would be expected from a reasonable person in the circumstances.
3. A causal link between the breach and the psychiatric illness, i.e. the nervous shock was the direct consequence of the defendant's breach of duty;
4. The nervous shock was not too remote a consequence of the breach.

For fear of spurious actions and unlimited liability of the defendant to all those who may suffer nervous shock in one form or other, the English courts have developed a number of "control mechanisms" or limitations of liability for nervous shock. These control mechanisms usually aim at limiting the scope of the defendant's duty of care not to cause nervous shock, as well as at causation and remoteness.

=== Primary victims ===
A "primary victim" is a person who was physically injured or could foresee-ably have been physically injured as a result of the defendants negligence. An example of this is a claimant who is involved in a car accident caused by the defendant's careless driving and gets mildly injured (or even remains unharmed) as a consequence, but the fright from the crash triggers a serious mental condition. Such a claimant can recover damages for his car, his minor injuries and the nervous shock he had suffered. Rescuers (such as firemen, policemen or volunteers) who put themselves in the way of danger and suffer psychiatric shock as a result used to be "primary victims", until the decision in White v Chief Constable of the South Yorkshire Police explained that rescuers had no special position in the law and had to prove reasonable fear as a consequence of exposure to danger.

=== Secondary victims ===
A "secondary victim" is a person who suffers nervous shock without himself being exposed to danger. An example of this is a spectator at a car race, who witnesses a terrible crash caused by negligence on the part of the car manufacturers and develops a nervous illness as a result of his experience. It is in these cases where the courts have been particularly reluctant to award damages for nervous shock. In several decisions, the courts have identified several strict requirements for the recognition of a duty of care not to cause nervous shock, as well as causation and remoteness:

- The claimant must perceive an "accident" with his own unaided senses, as an eye-witness to the event, or hearing the event in person, or viewing its "immediate aftermath". This requires close physical proximity to the event, and would usually exclude events witnessed by television or informed of by a third party.
- Proximity to accident requirements mean claimants who develop a depression from living with a relative debilitated by the accident will not be able to recover damages.
- If the nervous shock is caused by witnessing the death or injury of another person the claimant must show a "sufficiently proximate" relationship to that person, usually described as a "close tie of love and affection". Such ties are presumed to exist only between parents and children, as well as spouses and fiancés. In other relations, including siblings, ties of love and affection must be proved.
- It must be reasonably foreseeable that a person of "normal fortitude" in the claimant's position would suffer psychiatric damage. The closer the tie between the claimant and the victim, the more likely it is that he would succeed in this element. However, once it is shown that some psychiatric damage was foreseeable, it does not matter that the claimant was particularly susceptible to psychiatric illness - the defendant must "take his victim as he finds him" and pay for all the consequences of nervous shock (see "Eggshell skull" rule). A mere bystander can therefore hardly count on compensation for psychiatric shock, unless he had witnessed something so terrible that anybody could be expected to suffer psychiatric injury as a result. However, it seems that such a case is purely theoretic (see McFarlane v. EE Caledonia Ltd, where the plaintiff witnessed an explosion of a rig where he and his colleagues worked, but received no compensation).

=== Leading cases ===
The current leading case is Paul v Royal Wolverhampton NHS Trust

Of further interest are two House of Lords decisions arising from the Hillsborough disaster:

- Alcock v Chief Constable of South Yorkshire Police [1992] 1 A.C. 310
- White v Chief Constable of South Yorkshire Police [1999] 2 A.C. 455

and a third House of Lords decision in a case arising from a road traffic accident:

- Page v Smith [1996] A.C. 155

See also McLoughlin v O'Brian [1982] 2 All ER 298, where the House of Lords outlines the concept of "immediate aftermath" of the accident and Attia v British Gas plc [1988] QB 304, where the Court of Appeal considered whether damages for nervous shock as a result of witnessing the destruction of property were recoverable.

=== Criticism ===
The current position of the English courts has been criticised as leading to unfair results both in law and from the medical point of view. For example, it may be arbitrary that a mother who witnesses the death of her child with her own eyes can recover if she develops a mental illness, while one that hears of her child's death on the phone and suffers the same condition cannot.

Reform has been widely advocated and in 1998 the Law Commission has drafted a proposal, suggesting i.a. that the requirements of proximity in time and space to the accident and the "own unaided senses" rule should be abolished. The Department for Constitutional Affairs rejected the recommended legislative reform in 2007, noting that the courts had adopted a more flexible approach, and proposed to leave this area to the courts. In July 2009, the Ministry of Justice confirmed that it did not intend to proceed with the Law Commission's recommendations in this area.

== See also ==
- English tort law
- Intentional infliction of emotional distress
- Paul & Anor v Royal Wolverhampton NHS Trust [2024] UKSC 1
