= Mercer v Alternative Future Group Ltd =

- Court: Supreme Court of the United Kingdom
- Citation: UKSC 12

Keywords
- Detriment, union activities

Mercer v Alternative Future Group Ltd [2024] UKSC 12 is a UK labour law case, concerning the right to strike for fair wages and to not be subjected to detriment.

== Facts ==
Mercer was suspended after organising strikes for better wages as a trade union representative for Unison in her workplace at the Alternative Futures Group, a charity with the slogan "Amazing people... doing amazing things... every day". The employer claimed strike action was not protected from detriment under TULRCA 1992 section 146, which did not extend to strikes by its reference to the "appropriate time". Mercer argued it was necessary to protect strike action among other things to comply with the right to strike and freedom of association in ECHR article 11.

The Tribunal held that an interpretation of section 146 to cover detriment for strike action would go against the "legislative scheme". The Secretary of State intervened on the employer's side.

== Judgment ==
=== Employment Appeal Tribunal ===
Choudhury J held that TULRCA 1992 section 146 could be interpreted compatibly with ECHR article 11, to protect the right to industrial action. Although on a proper construction protection fell for strike action fell under section 152, not section 146, it could be possible to effectively add a new sub paragraph (c) that time in working hours on strike was protected. To permit disciplinary action against workers simply for exercising the right to strike would fundamentally contradict the ECtHR authorities.

=== Court of Appeal ===
The Court of Appeal restored the Tribunal, and held that section 146 could not be interpreted compatibly with ECHR article 11.

=== Supreme Court ===
The Supreme Court held that section 146 was incompatible with ECHR article 11. Because it literally restricted detriment against a worker for union activities "at an appropriate time", and that was defined as outside working hours, employers could subject workers to detriment for strikes in working hours, without any remedy for the worker. The provision could not be interpreted compatibly with article 11. The Supreme Court therefore issued a declaration of incompatibility under the Human Rights Act 1998 section 4.

Lady Simler gave the judgment of the court.

== See also ==
- UK labour law
