= Kostal UK Ltd v Dunkley =

UK legal case concerning union membership

- Court: Supreme Court of the United Kingdom
- Citation: [2021] UKSC 47

Keywords
- Freedom of association, detriment

Kostal UK Ltd v Dunkley [2021] UKSC 47 is a United Kingdom labour law case concerning the right not to suffer detriment for joining a trade union, or inducements not to join a trade union.

== Facts ==
Dunkley and others claimed that their right not to be induced to leave a collective agreement had been violated by their employer. Kostal UK Ltd wrote to employees, re-stating a pay offer that the union had rejected and stating that if it was not accepted by 18 December, no Christmas bonus would be paid (as was in the offer). In January 2016, it wrote to the employees saying that non-acceptance could lead to dismissal. The employees claimed that this was an unlawful inducement under section 145B of the Trade Union and Labour Relations (Consolidation) Act 1992 (TULRCA 1992), which provides for a "prohibited result" that the workers' terms of employment "will not (or will no longer) be determined by collective agreement".

The Tribunal found that the employers' conduct was unlawful. The Court of Appeal reversed this, Singh LJ finding in the employers' favour. The employees appealed.

== Judgment ==
The Supreme Court of the United Kingdom held that the employer's offer to workers violated section 145B of the Trade Union and Labour Relations (Consolidation) Act 1992 (TULRCA 1992) if the workers' terms would not be determined by collective agreement, or if there was a real possibility of that outcome. This should be assumed where there was an agreed collective bargaining procedure that was not complied with.

Lord Leggatt said the following:

63. There is an important feature of the wording of section 145B which both parties’ interpretations of the section leave out of account. In this respect, although diametrically opposed, they seem to me to share a common flaw. In both cases they treat the question whether an offer falls within section 145B(1)(a) and (2) as depending entirely on the content of the offer. On the claimants’ preferred interpretation, all that matters is whether the offer is to agree a change which has not been collectively agreed with the union to a term or terms of the individual worker’s contract of employment. On the company’s interpretation, all that matters is whether the offer requires the worker to contract out of any collective bargaining rights.

64. Both interpretations fail to reflect the structure of section 145B. What is prohibited by the section is not the making of an offer which, if accepted, would constitute an agreement with a particular content. Rather, what is prohibited is the making of an offer which, if accepted, would have a particular result. Furthermore, and importantly, that result is not defined as one which follows simply from acceptance of the offer by the worker who is the subject of section 145B: it takes account additionally of any offers which the employer also makes to other workers and requires consideration of what would happen if all the offers made were accepted. This indicates that section 145B is concerned not merely with the content of individual offers but with the potential practical consequences of the employer’s conduct, considered in the round. The interpretations of section 145B for which the claimants and the company contend both seem to me incapable of explaining why, in judging whether acceptance of an offer would have the prohibited result, it is necessary to assume, as required by subsection (1)(a), “other workers’ acceptance of offers which the employer also makes to them."

...

69. This interpretation of section 145B is further supported by section 145D(4)(a) of the 1992 Act. That provision identifies, as a matter which must be taken into account in determining whether an employer’s sole or main purpose in making offers was the prohibited purpose, any evidence:

“that when the offers were made the employer … did not wish to use, arrangements agreed with the union for collective bargaining.”

As Professors Alan Bogg and Keith Ewing have pointed out in a commentary on this case, this supports the inference that, where the acceptance of individual offers would by-pass arrangements agreed with the union for collective bargaining, such acceptance would have the prohibited result: see Bogg and Ewing, “Collective Bargaining and Individual Contracts in Kostal UK Ltd v Dunkley: A Wilson and Palmer for the 21st century?” (2020) 49 ILJ 430, 451.

Lord Burrows and Lady Arden said the following.

113. It is very important to stress—and it may be this that makes the interpretation of sections 145B and 145D particularly difficult—that the words in section 145B(1)(b), stating that “the employer’s sole or main purpose in making the offers is to achieve that result [i.e., the prohibited result]”, cannot be read literally. A literal interpretation—so that offers of individual agreements with workers (who are members of a recognized trade union or a trade union seeking recognition) on any terms of employment would automatically mean that the employer’s main purpose is to achieve the prohibited result—would leave no scope for the idea that the employer does not infringe section 145B if they have a genuine business purpose. Yet section 145D(4) makes clear that, through the concept of “the employer’s sole or main purpose”, offers to particular workers are sometimes acceptable and do not infringe section 145B. This is consistent with the government’s explanation of the policy set out in paragraph 99 above. The words in section 145B(1)(b) must therefore be interpreted (see Simler J at paragraph 97(v) above) as excusing the employer where, even though acceptance of the offer would have the prohibited result, the employer has a genuine business purpose. In other words, the employer does not have the main purpose of achieving the prohibited result where they have a genuine business purpose. Where this is in dispute, it will be for employment tribunals to make findings of fact as to the employer’s main purpose.[1]

...

116. Secondly, “the workers’ terms of employment” in section 145B(2) must be referring to the category of terms that would be incorporated into the workers’ contracts. Oliver Segal QC, counsel for the appellants, referred us to National Coal Board v National Union of Mineworkers [1986] ICR 736, 772, in which Scott J approved the submission of counsel that there is:

“a distinction between terms of a collective agreement which are of their nature apt to become enforceable terms of an individual’s contract of employment and terms which are of their nature inapt to become enforceable by individuals. Terms of collective agreements fixing rates of pay, or hours of work, would obviously fall into the first category.”

Let us assume, therefore, that, immediately before an individual offer as to pay is accepted by a relevant worker, the worker’s contractual right was to the pay set by collective agreement. It would follow that, immediately after acceptance, that worker’s pay would no longer be determined by collective agreement but would be that set out in the employer’s offer. The “prohibited result” would thereby be brought about, albeit for a limited period, until the terms fixed by any subsequent collective agreement replaced those terms.[2]

(6) The interpretation taken by the Court of Appeal would render it very difficult in practice to establish a breach of section 145B 122. The approach we are here putting forward is further strengthened by a concern that, if one were to take the narrow approach favored by the Court of Appeal, or even if, beyond that, one insisted that there must be express reference to contracting out including on one occasion, one would be rendering it very difficult in practice to establish a breach of section 145B. Indeed, one might go so far as to say that it would render section 145B a virtual dead letter. This was the point made by the Employment Appeal Tribunal (EAT) that we have set out at paragraph 97(iii) above. The facts of this case beautifully illustrate the point. If we were to dismiss this appeal, employers would be advised that, provided they do not expressly mention in individual offers that the workers must give up or surrender rights to have terms fixed by collective bargaining, and provided they continue to show commitment to collective bargaining by little more than what the ET described as “window dressing” (see paragraph 94 above), they can avoid being in breach of section 145B. Although strongly supportive of the Court of Appeal’s approach, Bowers (2020) 136 LQR 186, 191, recognized the reality that that approach would render it very difficult to establish a breach of section 145B:

“In reality, unless there is a pattern of behaviour from which inferences might be drawn of anti-union hostility, it is likely to become very difficult to establish a breach of section 145B in future cases. This is because any well-advised employer is likely to emphasise the particular reasons for an offer being made at that time, and that it is not about withdrawing from collective bargaining in future.”

...

(9) The decision in this case and the wider context 126. It is important to stress that, on the facts of this case, we need go no further than deciding that an employer is in breach of section 145B: (i) where an offer, if accepted, would constitute contracting out of collective bargaining on this occasion, so that that offer falls within the prohibition in section 145B as satisfying the “prohibited result” requirement; and (ii) where the employer’s main purpose was to achieve that result rather than having a genuine business purpose (and the factual findings of the ET are determinative on that). We do not think it would be helpful to speculate as to what the position would be on other hypothetical facts. But in applying the statutory provisions, we think it is useful always to have in mind the following two questions:

(a) Is the employer, in form or in substance, making an offer for the workers to contract out of collective bargaining, whether in the future or on this occasion?

(b) Is the employer seeking to bypass the agreed (or, if the union is seeking recognition, the contemplated) collective bargaining procedures, or does the employer have a genuine business purpose in making the individual offers?

On the facts of this case, Kostal was making an offer for the workers to contract out of collective bargaining on this occasion; and Kostal was seeking to bypass the agreed collective bargaining procedures and did not have a genuine business purpose in making the individual offers.[3]

127. One point raised at the hearing was how precisely these statutory provisions operate where the relevant trade union is seeking recognition but has not yet been recognized. It is unnecessary for us to decide this, but we see no difficulty in applying the provisions in the way that we have explained above. We have explained above, at paragraph 116, that one needs an existing or envisaged collective agreement in order to establish the “prohibited result”. Plainly, an offer requiring the trade union member (even though the trade union is merely seeking recognition) formally to contract out of a future collective agreement would be covered. But assuming that, even in this context, the prohibited result may extend beyond that formal contracting out, the employer is, as ever, excused where it has a genuine business purpose. And, although we are hesitant to speculate without facts, one can readily anticipate that, where a trade union is only at the stage of seeking recognition, it is likely to be easier for the employer to establish that it has a genuine business purpose than where a union has already been recognized.

(10) Article 11? 128. Mr. Segal submitted, as an alternative argument to his primary submissions applying ordinary statutory interpretation, that the Court of Appeal’s interpretation of sections 145B and 145D contravened Article 11 of the European Convention on Human Rights (ECHR), so that the provisions should be "read down" so as to be ECHR-compliant under section 3 of the Human Rights Act 1998. He referred us to relevant decisions of the ECtHR since Wilson and Palmer v UK, including, most importantly, Demir v Turkey (2009) 48 EHRR 54 and to the helpful summary of the Strasbourg case law by Underhill LJ in Pharmacists’ Defence Association Union v Boots Management Services Ltd [2017] EWCA Civ 66; [2017] IRLR 355, paragraphs 29–47. Although we have seen that one of the purposes of sections 145B and 145D was to ensure that domestic law was brought into line with the ECHR decision on Article 11 in Wilson and Palmer v UK, we have not found it necessary to explore in any further detail the law on Article 11. We therefore prefer to say nothing further on that issue.[4]

9. The judgment of Lord Leggatt

129. Since writing this judgment, we have had the benefit of reading the judgment of Lord Leggatt (with whom Lord Briggs and Lord Kitchin agree). While we agree with the decision that he reaches in this case, it will be apparent from our judgment that we take a different interpretation of sections 145B and 145D, which does not turn on considering the causal question as to whether there was a real possibility that, if the offers had not been made and accepted, the workers’ relevant terms of employment would have been determined by a new collective agreement reached for the period in question (see Lord Leggatt’s judgment at paragraph 65). We have explained above (see in particular paragraphs 113 and 116) what we consider to be the correct interpretation of sections 145B and 145D. On our interpretation, contrary to Lord Leggatt’s approach (see his judgment at paragraph 67), it does not necessarily follow that the employer escapes liability just because the collective bargaining process for this round has been exhausted. For example, an employer who has been determined to thwart the bargaining process does not have a genuine business purpose (and indeed would fall within section 145D(4)(a)). Nor, as we indicate at paragraph 125 of our judgment, do we share Lord Leggatt’s criticism (see paragraph 47 of his judgment) of the emphasis on reasonableness, which the EAT held would apply in assessing the employer’s purpose. We do not accept that a reasonableness test without precise criteria is unworkable. For example, a test of whether the employer has acted within “a band or range of reasonable responses” to an employee’s misconduct is applied in the context of unfair dismissal (see, e.g., Graham v Secretary of State for Work and Pensions [2012] EWCA Civ 903; [2012] IRLR 759, paragraph 36). In general terms, we consider, with respect, that the words, context, and purpose of the statutory provisions lead to the interpretation we favor rather than that put forward by Lord Leggatt.[5]

Lady Arden and Lord Burrows, [126]-[129] would have gone further: an employer breached s 145B where (i) an offer, if accepted, would constitute contracting out of collective bargaining on that occasion so that the offer satisfied the "prohibited result" requirement; and (ii) the employer's main purpose was to achieve that result rather than having a genuine business purpose. On that interpretation, it did not necessarily follow that the employer escaped liability just because the collective bargaining process had been exhausted.

== See also ==
- UK labour law
