= White v Chief Constable of the South Yorkshire Police =

UK legal case

White v Chief Constable of the South Yorkshire Police was a 1998 case in English tort law in which police officers who were present in the aftermath of the Hillsborough disaster sued for post traumatic stress disorder. The claim was rejected by the House of Lords on the basis that none of the claimants could be considered "primary victims" "since none of them were at any time exposed to personal danger nor reasonably believed themselves to be so".

The decision could have been disposed of in the manner of Chadwick v British Railways Board, where the rescuer may not have been in physical danger but was awarded damages due to his putting himself in the 'zone of danger', after the event. This was not followed and the "rescuers" category was thus limited in terms of people acting in the course of their job.

== See also ==
- Alcock v Chief Constable of South Yorkshire Police
