= Floodgates principle =

Legal principle

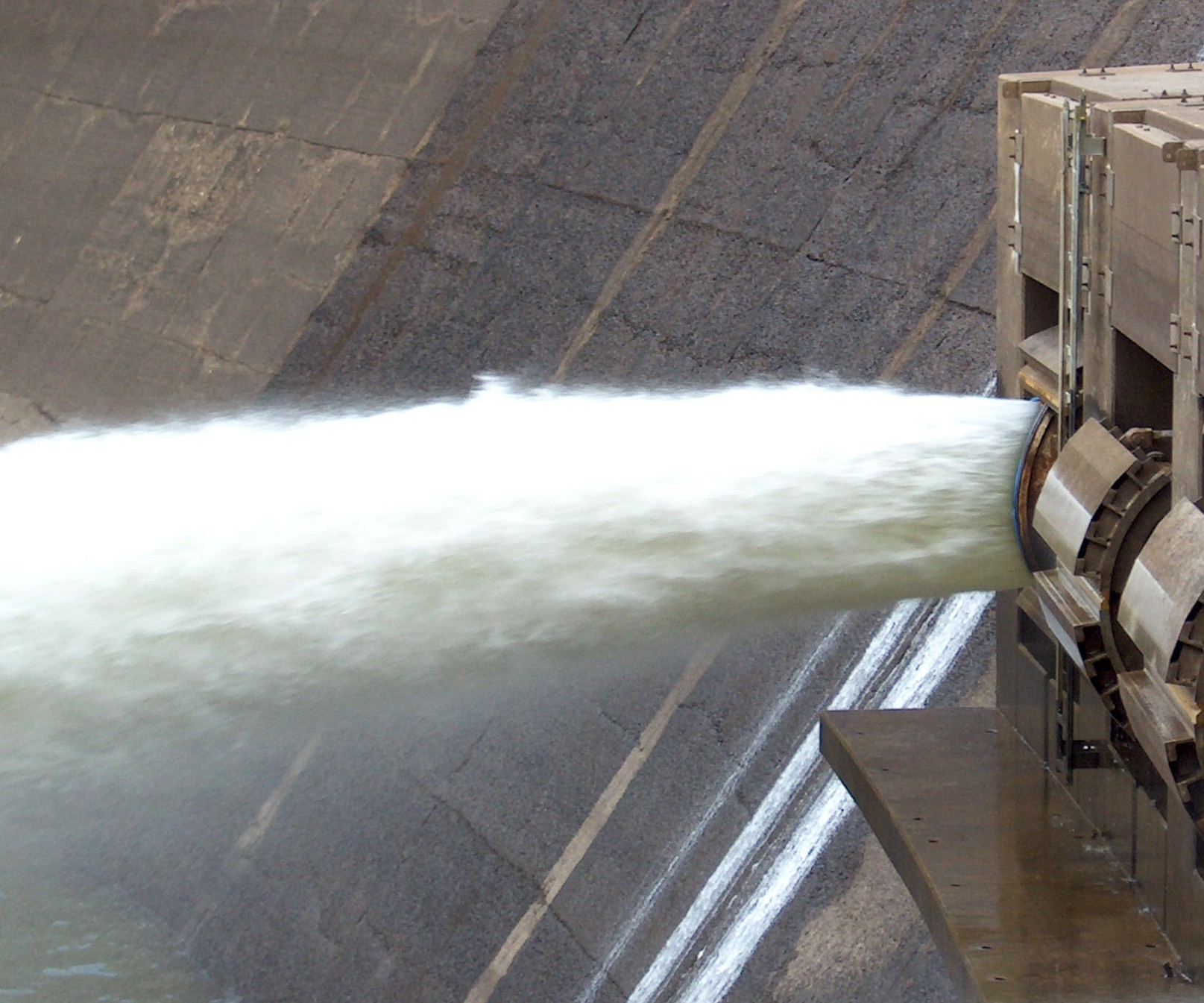
"Floodgate" is a visual metaphor suggesting a potential torrent of claims.

The floodgates principle, or the floodgates argument, is a legal principle which is sometimes applied by judges to restrict or limit the right to make claims for damages because of a concern that permitting a claimant to recover in such situations might open the metaphorical "floodgates" to large numbers of claims and lawsuits. The principle is most frequently cited in common law jurisdictions, and in English tort law in particular.

Most of the situations in which the courts have employed the floodgates argument have revolved around liability in tort, and in particular in relation to the liability for nervous shock or for pure economic loss. The rationale in which the floodgates principle has been applied may vary. In some cases it is expressed to be a constraint upon when a defendant will owe a duty of care, in others it is expressed to be a limitation upon the remoteness of damage for which a defendant should be held responsible for. In other cases it is simply stated as a principle of public policy.

The floodgates principle is arguably the antithesis of the legal maxim: fiat justitia ruat caelum ("let justice be done though the heavens fall").

== Rationale ==
The core of the principle was enunciated by the then-Chief Justice of the New York Court of Appeals (later Associate Supreme Court Justice) Benjamin N. Cardozo in Ultramares Corp. v. Touche (1932) 174 N.E. 441 as the risk of exposing defendants to liability for "indeterminate amount for an indeterminate time to an indeterminate class".

In Spartan Steel & Alloys Ltd v Martin & Co (Contractors) Ltd Lord Denning MR put the same point in more expansive terms:

[I]f claims for economic loss were permitted for this particular hazard, there would be no end of claims. Some might be genuine, but many might be inflated, or even false. A machine might not have been in use anyway, but it would be easy to put it down to the cut in supply. It would be well-nigh impossible to check the claims. If there was economic loss on one day, did the claimant do his best to mitigate it by working harder next day? and so forth. Rather than expose claimants to such temptation and defendants to such hard labour - on comparatively small claims - it is better to disallow economic loss altogether, at any rate when it stands alone, independent of any physical damage.

If a party by their negligence causes physical injury to one other person, then the pool of claimants for that physical injury is just that person. However, if each person who suffers resultant economic loss as a result of the injury to the person is also able to make a claim, then potentially the negligent party (and the courts) could be opened up to a vast array of claims. Similarly, where a party publishes a negligent in a document, if that document is published widely, if every person who read that statement was entitled to rely upon it and claim for any loss caused by relying upon it, there would similarly be an extremely wide-ranging liability for negligent misstatement. The last, and probably most difficult area where the floodgates principle has been evoked relates to psychiatric injury, or "nervous shock". How far should a person be liable if they injure someone negligently, and then other persons see the accident and suffer psychiatric injury (but no physical harm) just from witnessing the accident? In trying to answer these questions the courts have sometimes fallen back on the floodgates principle to try and limit the potential range of claims.

== Nervous shock cases ==
In English law the first recorded reference to the floodgates principle was in 1888 in Victorian Railway Commissioners v Coultas That case involved a pregnant woman (the claimant) whose husband had driven onto train tracks at a level crossing, and due to the negligence of the gate keeper, were nearly struck by a high speed train. The plaintiff, Mrs Coultas, suffered from serious shock, leading to impaired memory and eyesight, and the loss of her unborn child. Nonetheless, the Privy Council held that she had no sustainable claim for damages, holding that:

Damages arising from mere sudden terror unaccompanied by any actual physical injury, but occasioning a nervous or mental shock, cannot under such circumstances, their Lordships think, be considered a consequence which, in the ordinary course of things, would flow from the negligence of the gate-keeper. ... damages must be the natural and reasonable result of the defendant's act; such a consequence as in the ordinary course of things would flow from that act.

The leading authority on nervous shock cases under English law is now Alcock v Chief Constable of South Yorkshire Police, a case which draws heavily upon the floodgates principle. In limiting the right to recover to those who saw the accident or its immediate aftermath Lord Oliver held:

It would be inaccurate and hurtful to suggest that grief is made any the less real or deprivation more tolerable by a more gradual realisation, but to extend liability to cover injury in such cases would be to extend the law in a direction for which there is no pressing policy need and in which there is no logical stopping point.

=== "Worried well" cases ===
As an adjunct to the nervous shock cases, the courts have also had to consider claims by persons who are loosely classified as the "worried well", i.e. persons who are not actually ill, but have suffered an exposure and therefore are greatly concerned they may become gravely ill. These claims often relate to asbestos exposure, as mesothelioma can take 20 to 50 years, or longer, to manifest after an exposure. To date, the courts have appeared unwilling to consider claims from the "worried well".

== Pure economic loss cases ==
Pure economic loss cases have also felt the strong influence of the concerns of the courts in relation to the floodgates principle. The English Court of Appeal in the decision of Spartan Steel & Alloys Ltd v Martin & Co (Contractors) Ltd made extensive reference to risks of such claims, and sought to limit economic loss to claims which are proximate to physical damage.

== Negligent misstatement ==
Judicial concern has also been expressed about potential liability for negligent misstatements. Unlike physical acts, a negligent statement may be relied upon by a great many people leading to a wide class of potential claims. Accordingly, in Hedley Byrne & Co Ltd v Heller & Partners Ltd the House of Lords imposed the requirement that there would need to be a "special relationship" in order to justify a duty of care under which a person making a negligent statement could be held liable to a person who relied upon it.

== Other cases ==
In Hill v Chief Constable of West Yorkshire the House of Lords had to consider a claim by Jacqueline Hill, the last victim of Peter Sutcliffe (a serial killer known as the "Yorkshire Ripper"), against the police. The case argued that police had been sloppy and careless in their investigation, and if they had not been so the killer would have caught long before he murdered his last few victims. The claim was struck out on a number of grounds, one of which was the risk that every victim of crime might have an action against the police arguing that they should have caught the perpetrators at an earlier stage of their criminal careers.

The decision was upheld in Kent v Griffiths and rationalised on a different basis, viz., that the emergency services to do not owe general duties to the public on grounds of public policy.

However, by contrast in Dorset Yacht Co Ltd v Home Office the House of Lords were fully prepared to hold the Home Office responsible for the acts of young offenders whom it failed to supervise, and who subsequently caused damage to the property of various members of the general public.

== Examples of opening the floodgates ==
The floodgates principle is by no means a principle of universal application.

The courts have, on occasion, been prepared to uphold claims notwithstanding that they recognise that the effect of a decision will most likely result in a large amount of subsequent litigation. In the case of Hazell v Hammersmith and Fulham LBC the House of Lords upheld a claim that interest rate swaps entered into with local authorities in the United Kingdom were void although they knew that large numbers of such contracts had been entered into, and that unwinding the swaps would result in a large amount of litigation. In the event, over 200 separate sets of legal proceedings were launched, several of which were litigated to the Court of Appeal and three of which reached the House of Lords.
