= Alcock v Chief Constable of South Yorkshire Police =

English tort law case on liability for nervous shock (psychiatric injury)

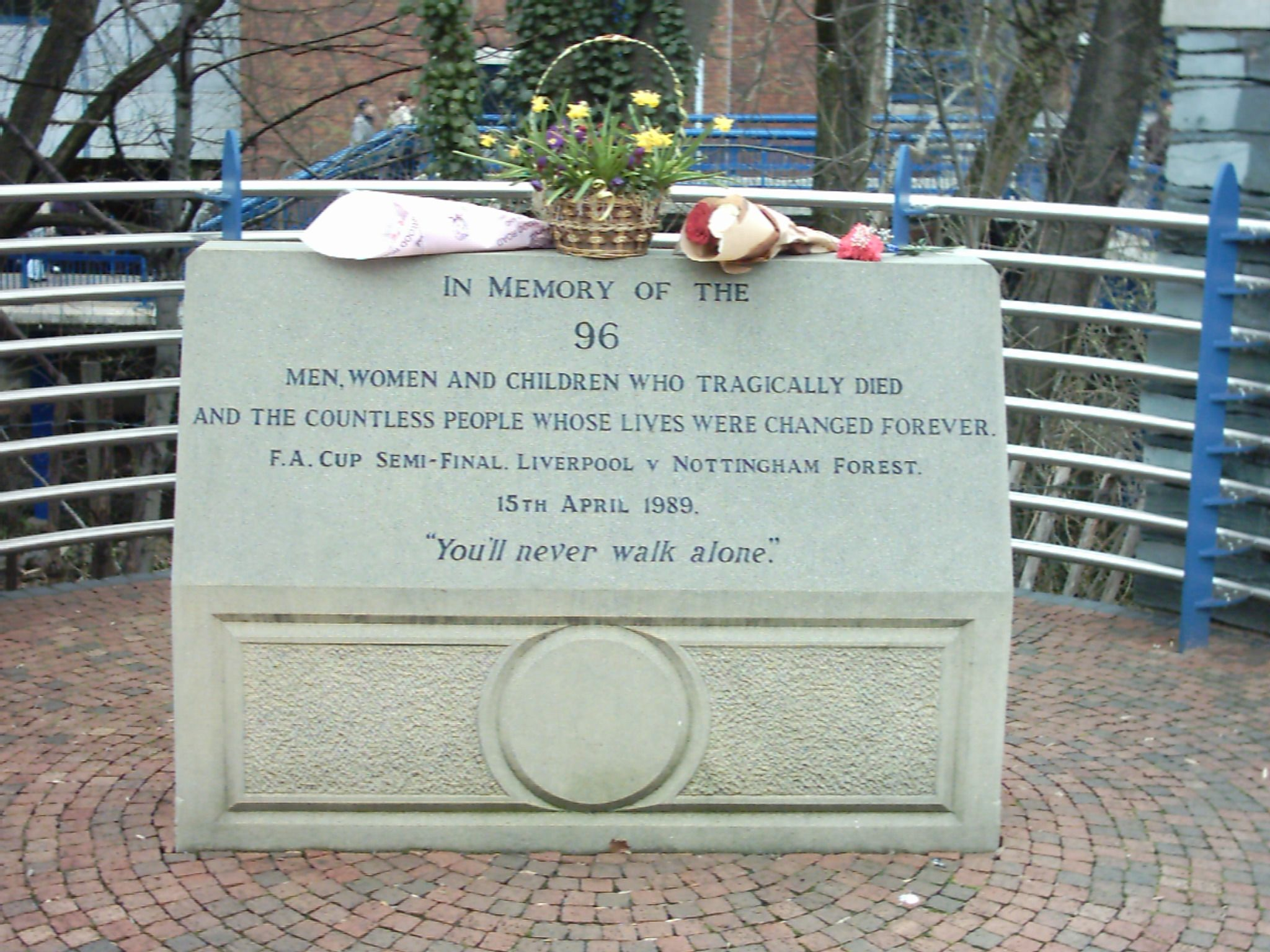
- Court: House of Lords
- Decided: 28 December 1991
- Citation: [1992] 1 AC 310
- Transcript: transcript at BAILII

Court membership
- Judges sitting: Lord Keith of Kinkel; Lord Ackner; Lord Oliver of Aylmerton; Lord Jauncey of Tullichettle; Lord Lowry

Keywords
- Negligence, nervous shock, primary and secondary victims

Alcock v Chief Constable of South Yorkshire Police [1991] UKHL 5, [1992] 1 AC 310 is a leading English tort law case on liability for nervous shock (psychiatric injury). The case centred upon the liability of the police for the nervous shock suffered in consequence of the events of the Hillsborough disaster.

== Facts ==
Alcock concerned psychiatric harm caused by the Hillsborough disaster of 1989. This occurred at the Hillsborough Football Stadium, Sheffield during the FA Cup Semi-Final in which 97 spectators were killed and 450 injured in a human crush. The disaster was broadcast live on television and radio. Despite considerable public controversy, South Yorkshire Police had admitted liability in negligence for the deaths, having allowed too many supporters into the stadium.

In the Alcock case, 10 relatives of the deceased brought negligence claims in tort for psychiatric harm or nervous shock. Of the claimants, most had not been present in the stadium at the time of the disaster and none had been in physical risk. Most had sustained psychiatric injuries after learning of the events by television or radio.

== Judgment ==
The plaintiffs in this case were mostly secondary victims, i.e. they were not "directly affected" as opposed to the primary victims who were either injured or were in danger of immediate injury. The Judicial Committee of the House of Lords, consisting of Lord Keith of Kinkel, Lord Ackner, Lord Oliver of Aylmerton, Lord Jauncey of Tullichettle, and Lord Lowry has established a number of "control mechanisms" or conditions that had to be fulfilled in order for a duty of care to be found in such cases.

- The claimant who is a "secondary victim" must perceive a "shocking event" with his own unaided senses, as an eye-witness to the event, or hearing the event in person, or viewing its "immediate aftermath". This requires close physical proximity to the event, and would usually exclude events witnessed by television or informed of by a third party, as was the case with some of the plaintiffs in Alcock.
- The shock must be a "sudden" and not a "gradual" assault on the claimant's nervous system. So a claimant who develops a depression from living with a relative debilitated by the accident will not be able to recover damages.
- If the nervous shock is caused by witnessing the death or injury of another person the claimant must show a "sufficiently proximate" relationship to that person, usually described as a "close tie of love and affection". Such ties are presumed to exist only between parents and children, as well as spouses and fiancés. In other relations, including siblings, ties of love and affection must be proved.
- It must be reasonably foreseeable that a person of "normal fortitude" in the claimant’s position would suffer psychiatric damage. The closer the tie between the claimant and the victim, the more likely it is that he would succeed in this element. However, once it is shown that some psychiatric damage was foreseeable, it does not matter that the claimant was particularly susceptible to psychiatric illness - the defendant must "take his victim as he finds him" and pay for all the consequences of nervous shock (see "Eggshell skull" rule).

== Significance ==
The impact of this on the area of law once described as a '"patchwork quilt of distinctions which are quite difficult to justify" is significant because the decision made by the Law Lords was heavily influenced by the greater social concern of allowing a flood of claims with which the judicial system would not be able to cope (the "floodgates argument"). The decision has been criticised as being excessively harsh on the claimants, as well as not fully corresponding with medical knowledge regarding psychiatric illness brought about by nervous shock. Although reform has been widely advocated and a legislative proposal to mitigate some of the effects of Alcock was drafted by the Parliamentary Law Commission in 1998, the decision in Alcock represents the state of the law in the area of liability for psychiatric harm as it currently stands.

== See also ==
- White v Chief Constable of the South Yorkshire Police
- Paul & Anor v Royal Wolverhampton NHS Trust [2024] UKSC 1
- English tort law
- Nervous shock (English Law)
- Taylor Report (1990)
- BAILII link
