= Eggshell skull =

Legal principle

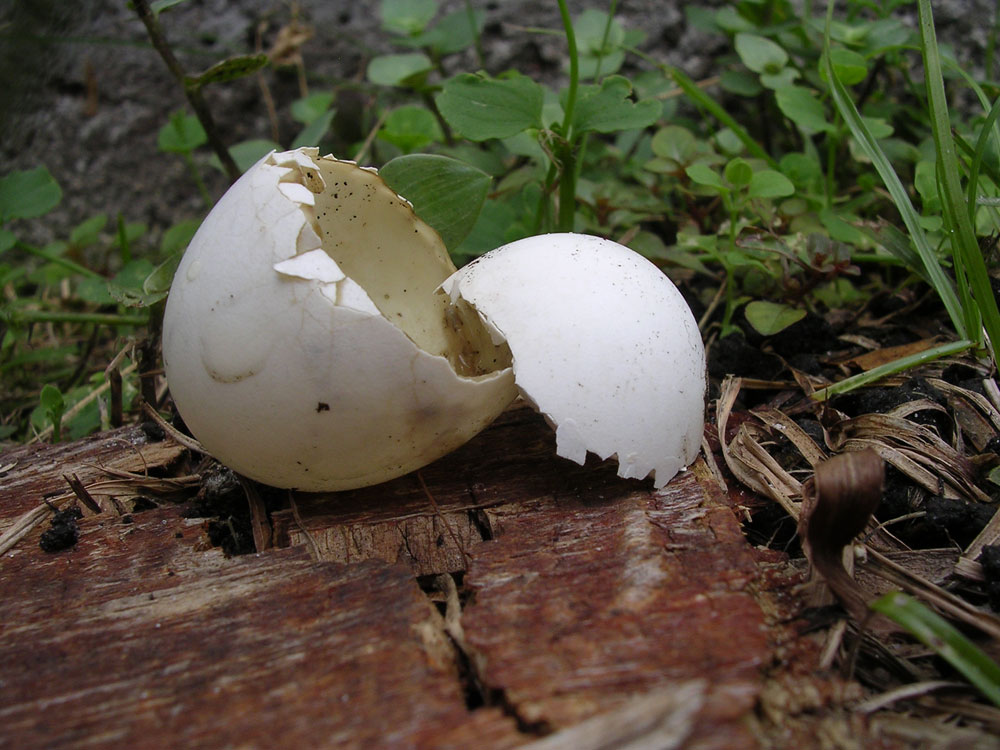
An eggshell is often used as a visual metaphor for the thin skull rule.

The eggshell skull rule (also thin skull rule, papier-mâché-plaintiff rule, or talem qualem rule) is a well-established legal doctrine in common law, used in some tort law systems, with a similar doctrine applicable to criminal law. The rule states that, in a tort case, the unexpected frailty of the injured person is not a valid defense to the seriousness of any injury caused to them.

== Law ==
This rule holds that a tortfeasor is liable for all consequences resulting from their tortious (usually negligent) activities leading to an injury to another person, even if the victim suffers an unusually high level of damage (e.g. due to a pre-existing vulnerability or medical condition). The eggshell skull rule takes into account the physical, social, and economic attributes of the plaintiff which might make them more susceptible to injury. It may also take into account the family and cultural environment. The term implies that if a person had a skull as delicate as that of the shell of an egg, and a tortfeasor who was unaware of the condition injured that person's head, causing the skull unexpectedly to break, the defendant would be held liable for all damages resulting from the wrongful contact, even if the tortfeasor did not intend to cause such a severe injury.

In criminal law, the general maxim is that the defendant must "take their victims as they find them", as echoed in the judgment of Lord Justice Lawton in R v. Blaue (1975), in which the defendant was held responsible for killing his victim, despite his contention that her refusal of a blood transfusion constituted an intervening act.

The doctrine is applied in all areas of torts – intentional torts, negligence, and strict liability cases – as well as in criminal law. There is no requirement of physical contact with the victim – if a trespasser's wrongful presence on the victim's property so terrifies the victim that he has a fatal heart attack, the trespasser will be liable for the damages stemming from his original tort. The foundation for this rule is based primarily on policy grounds. The courts do not want the defendant or accused to rely on the victim's own vulnerability to avoid liability.

The thin skull rule is not to be confused with the related crumbling skull rule in which the plaintiff suffers from an already deteriorating condition (from a prior injury, for instance) pre-existent to the occurrence of the present tort. In the "crumbling skull" rule, the prior condition is only to be considered with respect to distinguishing it from any new injury arising from the present tort – as a means of apportioning damages in such a way that the defendant would not be liable for placing the plaintiff in a better position than they were in prior to the present tort.

== Example ==
In an example, a person who has osteogenesis imperfecta (also known as "brittle bone syndrome") is more likely to be injured in a motor vehicle accident. If the person with OI is hit from behind in a motor vehicle collision and suffers medical damages (such as clavicle fracture), it would not be a valid defense to state that the osteogenesis imperfecta was the cause of the fracture.

== American cases ==
In 1891, the Wisconsin Supreme Court came to a similar result in Vosburg v. Putney. In that case, a boy kicked another from across the aisle in the classroom. It turned out that the victim had an unknown microbial condition that was irritated, and resulted in him entirely losing the use of his leg. No one could have predicted the level of injury. Nevertheless, the court found that the kicking was unlawful because it violated the "order and decorum of the classroom," and the perpetrator was therefore fully liable for the injury.

In Benn v. Thomas, the appellate court determined that the eggshell rule should have been applied to a case in which a man had a heart attack and died after being bruised in the chest during a rear-end car accident.

== Australian cases ==
In the Australian case of Nader v Urban Transit Authority of NSW, the plaintiff was a 10-year-old boy who struck his head on a bus stop pole while alighting from a slowly moving bus. He developed a rare psychological condition known as Ganser Syndrome. The defendant argued that the illness resulted from his family's response to the accident. McHugh JA said (at 537), "The defendant must take the plaintiff with all his weaknesses, beliefs and reactions as well as his capacities and attributes, physical, social and economic. If the result of an accident is that a ten year old boy reacts to his parents’ concern over his injuries and develops an hysterical condition, no reason of justice, morality or entrenched principle appears to me to prevent his recovery of compensation."

In the Australian case of Kavanagh v Akhtar, the court held the tortfeasor should take into account the plaintiff's family and cultural setting. Equality before the law puts a heavy onus on the person who would argue that the "unusual" reaction of an injured plaintiff should be disregarded because a minority religious or cultural situation may not have been foreseeable.

== British cases ==
In the 1962 English case of Smith v Leech Brain & Co, an employee in a factory was splashed with molten metal. The metal burned him on his lip, which happened to be premalignant tissue. He died three years later from cancer triggered by the injury. The judge held that as long as the initial injury was foreseeable, the defendant was liable for all the harm.

== Exceptions ==
Intervening cause is typically an exception to the eggshell skull rule. If an injury is not immediate, but a separate situation agitates the injury (such as the injured party being involved in a vehicular collision while being taken to a hospital), the tortfeasor is not liable under common law in Australia (see Haber v Walker, and Mahoney v Kruschich Demolitions). In Haber v Walker it was held that a plaintiff will not be liable for a novus actus interveniens (intervening act) if the chain of causation was broken by a voluntary, human act or, an independent event, which in conjunction with the wrongful act, was so unlikely as to be termed a coincidence. In Mahoney v Kruschich Demolitions the plaintiff, Glogovic, was injured while working on the demolition of a power house for the respondent. While being treated for his injuries, his injuries were exacerbated by the negligent medical treatment of the appellant, Mahony. It was held that there was no novus actus as a result of medical treatment of injuries caused by the defendant's negligence, unless such treatment is inexcusably bad or completely outside the bounds of what a reputable medical practitioner might prescribe.
