= Charles Ritchie Russell, Baron Russell of Killowen =

British judge (1908–1986)

The Right Honourable The Lord Russell of Killowen PC
- Russell in 1970, by Godfrey Argent

Lord of Appeal in Ordinary
- In office 1975–1982

Lord Justice of Appeal
- In office 1962–1975

Justice of the High Court
- In office 1960–1962

Personal details
- Born: Charles Ritchie Russell; 12 January 1908 London, England
- Died: 23 June 1986 (aged 78)
- Parent: Frank Russell (father)
- Education: Oriel College, Oxford

Charles Ritchie Russell, Baron Russell of Killowen, PC (12 January 1908 – 23 June 1986) was a British lawyer and judge who served as a Lord of Appeal in Ordinary between 1975 and 1982.

== Biography ==
Russell was born in London, the son of Frank Russell, Baron Russell of Killowen and the grandson of Charles Russell, Baron Russell of Killowen, both Lords of Appeal in Ordinary. His maternal grandfather was the Scottish politician Charles Ritchie, 1st Baron Ritchie of Dundee. Following his father, he was educated at Beaumont College and Oriel College, Oxford, where he took a Third in Jurisprudence. He was called to the bar by Lincoln's Inn in 1931.

During the Second World War, Russell was commissioned into the Royal Artillery, and flew into France on D-Day by glider. Wounded in action, he was mentioned in dispatches and received the French Croix de Guerre. Returning to the bar after the war, he took silk in 1948 at the age of forty, like his father and grandfather. He was Attorney General of the Duchy of Cornwall from 1951 to 1960. A leading Chancery counsel, he was appointed to the Chancery Division of the High Court in 1960, receiving the customary knighthood. He was promoted Lord Justice of Appeal in 1962, and was sworn of the Privy Council.

In 1960 he pleaded guilty to a charge of drunk driving, which was thought to have delayed his promotion. Nevertheless, on 30 September 1975, he was appointed Lord of Appeal in Ordinary and was made a life peer with the title Baron Russell of Killowen, of Killowen in the County Down, the same title that his grandfather and father had held.

== Famous judgments ==
- Whitehouse v Lemon; Whitehouse v Gay News Ltd [1979] AC 406, [1979] 2 WLR 281, [1979] 1 All ER 898

== Arms ==
Coat of arms of Charles Ritchie Russell, Baron Russell of Killowen
Crest A Goat passant Argent armed Or charged on the body with three Trefoils slipped fesswise Vert Escutcheon Argent a Lion rampant Gules on a chief Sable three Escallops of the field the whole within a Bordure engrailed Vert Supporters Dexter: A Goat Or semée of Trefoils slipped Vert and gorged with a Collar Gemel Gules; Sinister: A Lion reguardant Or semée of Escallops Gules and gorged with a like collar Motto Che sera sera (What will be, will be)
