= Jackson v Royal Bank of Scotland =

- Court: House of Lords
- Citation: [2005] UKHL 3

Case history
- Prior action: [2000] CLC 1457

Court membership
- Judges sitting: Lord Nicholls, Lord Hoffmann, Lord Hope, Lord Walker and Lord Brown

Jackson v Royal Bank of Scotland [2005] UKHL 3 is an English contract law case, which concerns remoteness of damage.

== Facts ==
Mr James Jackson was a partner with Barrie Stewart Davies (by the time, passed on), trading under the name "Samson Lancastrian". They imported dog chews from Thailand and sold them to a firm called "Economy Bag". They both had the same bank, the Royal Bank of Scotland. By mistake, RBS sent Economy Bag a document showing that Jackson was making a 19% markup on every transaction. Feeling cheated, they cancelled the business relationship with Jackson and Davies. Jackson sued RBS for the loss of the opportunity to make further profits.

At first instance, Jackson won, since the relationship would have continued for four more years on a decreasing scale, and after then further dealings would just be speculative.

The Court of Appeal held that damages should be limited to one year of the breach, and all other losses were too remote. Jackson appealed, arguing that one year was based on an error of principle, and in fact RBS's liability was open ended. RBS argued that no loss at all was foreseeable, because it was not within its reasonable contemplation that accidental disclosure would lead to the relationship being terminated.

== Judgment ==
The House of Lords held that the loss of future orders was not too remote, and that Jackson had an obvious commercial interest in retaining confidential information. The point of damages for breach of contract with RBS, to which Jackson was entitled, was to put him in the position as if there had been no breach.

On the issue of remoteness, the judge's assessment was a good one, in that it was increasingly likely as time passed that Economy Bag would want to squeeze Jackson's profit margins. To avoid further cost, that award (four years) would be restored.

Lord Walker made some interesting observations on the rule in Hadley v Baxendale.

46. In my opinion the familiar passage from the judgment of Baron Alderson, which Lord Hope sets out in his opinion, cannot be construed and applied as if it were a statutory text, nor are its two limbs mutually exclusive. The first limb, that is that the damages should be

"... such as may fairly and reasonably be considered [as] . . . arising naturally, ie according to the usual course of things, from such breach of contract itself",

tends to beg the question, since it makes the damages recoverable under the first limb depend on how the breach of contract is characterised. If for instance (by reference to the facts of Hadley v Baxendale itself) the breach is described simply as a carrier's failure to convey goods from Gloucester and deliver them to Greenwich within two days as promised, it is a matter of speculation what damages would arise naturally and in the ordinary course. If on the other hand the breach is described as a delay in delivering to the manufacturer at Greenwich a broken crankshaft to serve as a model for a new crankshaft urgently required for the only steam engine at a busy flour mill at Gloucester (which was standing idle until the new crankshaft arrived) then loss of business profits is seen to be an entirely natural consequence. The appropriate characterisation of the breach depends on the terms of the contract, its business context, and the reasonable contemplation of the parties (although Baron Alderson used the latter expression in relation to the second limb). He referred, at p 356, to the plaintiffs' failure to make known to the defendants:

"... the special circumstances, which perhaps, would have made it a reasonable and natural consequence of such breach of contract."

47. This point was very clearly explained by Lord Reid in Czarnikow Ltd v Koufos [1969] 1 AC 350, 383-5. He said at page 385A:

"I do not think that it was intended that there were to be two rules or that two different standards or tests were to be applied."

At page 385F he continued:

"The crucial question is whether, on the information available to the defendant when the contract was made, he should, or the reasonable man in his position would, have realised that such loss was sufficiently likely to result from the breach of contract to make it proper to hold that the loss flowed naturally from the breach or that loss of that kind should have been within his contemplation."

48. The common ground of the two limbs is what the contract-breaker knew or must be taken to have known, so as to bring the loss within the reasonable contemplation of the parties: see para (4) in the summary by Asquith LJ (giving the judgment of the Court of Appeal) in Victoria Laundry (Windsor) Ltd v Newman Industries Ltd [1949] 2 KB 528, 539. (That judgment received a mixed reception from this House in Czarnikow v Koufos [1969] 1 AC 350: Lord Morris of Borth-y-Gest, at p 399, found it "a most valuable analysis" but Lord Upjohn, at p 423, described it as a "colourful interpretation" of Hadley v Baxendale and Lord Reid, at pp 388-90, criticised some aspects of it, but not para (4) of Asquith LJ's summary.)

49. The common ground between the two limbs of the rule has also been noted by Evans LJ (with whom Waite LJ and Sir John May agreed) in Kpohraror v Woolwich Building Society [1996] 4 All ER 119. Evans LJ said (at pp 127-128):

"I would prefer to hold that the starting point of any application of Hadley v Baxendale] is the extent of the shared knowledge of both parties when the contract was made (see generally Chitty on Contracts, 27th ed (1994), Vol 1, para 26-023, including the possibility that knowledge of the defendant alone is enough). When that is established, it may often be the case that the first and second parts of the rule overlap, or at least that it seems unnecessary to draw a clear line of demarcation between them. This seems to me to be consistent with the commonsense approach suggested by Scarman LJ in H Parsons (Livestock) Ltd v Uttley Ingham & Co Ltd [1978] 1 All ER 525 at 541, [1978] QB 791 at 813, and to be applicable here."

== See also ==
- Hadley v Baxendale (1854) 9 Exch 341
- The Achilleas
