= C Czarnikow Ltd v Koufos =

English contract law case

The Heron II
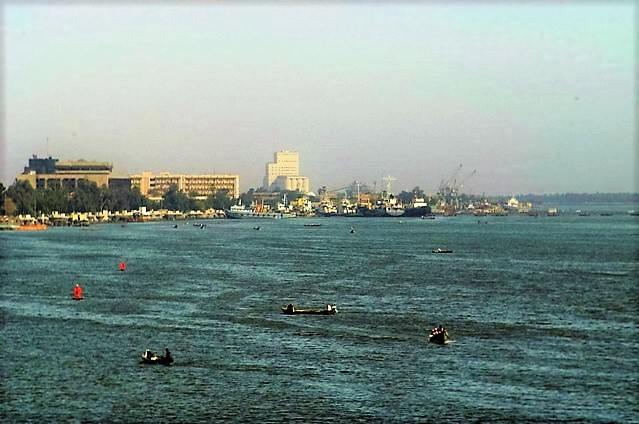
- Port of Basra. Heron II arrived there 9 days late.
- Court: House of Lords
- Decided: 17 October 1967
- Citation: [1969] 1 AC 350, [1967] 3 WLR 1491, [1967] 3 All ER 686, [1976] 2 Lloyd’s Rep 555

Case opinions
- Lord Reid, Lord Morris, Lord Hodson, Lord Pearce and Lord Upjohn

Keywords
- Remoteness

C Czarnikow Ltd v Koufos or The Heron II [1969] 1 AC 350 is an English contract law case, concerning remoteness of damage. The House of Lords held that the "remoteness" test, as a limit to liability, is, in contract, more restrictive than it is in tort.

== Facts ==
Koufos chartered a ship (the Heron II) from Czarnikow to bring 3,000 tons of sugar to Basra. It was nine days late. The sugar price had dropped from £32 10s to £31 2s 9d. Koufos claimed the difference in the loss of profit. Czarnikow knew there was a sugar market, but not that Koufos intended to sell it straight away.

== Judgment ==
The House of Lords held that the loss was not too remote. They stated that the test for remoteness in contract is narrower than it is in tort. While in tort any damage of a type which is reasonably foreseeable can be claimed, Lord Reid ruled that, in contract, the defendant must ought to have realised that the loss was 'not unlikely to result from the breach of contract'. A higher degree of probability is needed for the loss to be in the contemplation of the parties. Lord Reid disapproved of Asquith LJ’s judgment in Victoria Laundry v Newman in that the term "foreseeability" was employed. He emphasised that he would use the words ‘not unlikely’ as denoting a degree of probability considerably less than an even chance but nevertheless not very unusual and easily foreseeable. He emphasised that the tests in tort and contract were very different, on the basis that where there is a contract the parties will have had the opportunity to apportion their liabilities already. Therefore, the test for remoteness should be less generous than in tort, where consequential losses must be very remote to preclude compensation.

Lord Morris, Lord Hodson, Lord Pearce and Lord Upjohn were generally approving of Asquith LJ's language.

== See also ==
- Hadley v Baxendale
- Victoria Laundry (Windsor) Ltd v Newman Industries Ltd [1948] 2 KB 528
- Parsons (Livestock) Ltd v Uttley Ingham & Co Ltd [1978] 1 QB 791
- South Australia Asset Management Co v York Montague [1996] 3 All ER 365
- The Achilleas [2008] UKHL 48
- Isaac Naylor & Sons Ltd v NZ Co-op Wool Marketing Assoc Ltd [1981] 1 NZLR 361
