= Parsons (Livestock) Ltd v Uttley Ingham & Co Ltd =

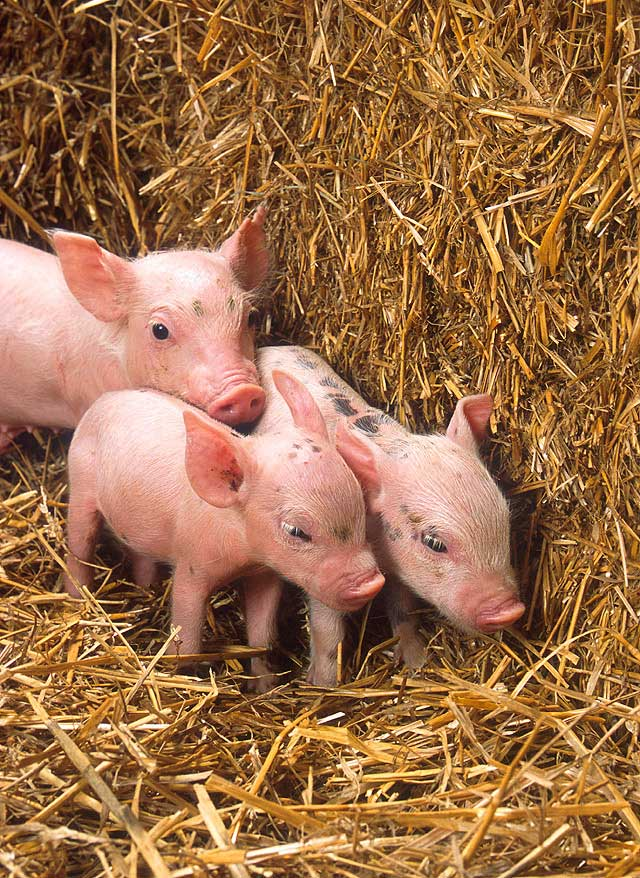
- Court: Court of Appeal
- Citation: [1978] QB 791, [1977] 3 WLR 990, [1977] 2 Lloyd's Rep 522

Case opinions
- Scarman LJ, Orr LJ and Lord Denning MR

Parsons (Livestock) Ltd v Uttley Ingham & Co Ltd [1978] QB 791 is an English contract law case, concerning remoteness of damage. In it, the majority held that losses for breach of contract are recoverable if the type or kind of loss is a likely result of the breach of contract. Lord Denning MR, dissenting on the reasoning, held that a distinction should be drawn between losses for physical damage (for which the same, restrictive test as in tort applies) and economic losses (where a wider remoteness rule applies).

== Facts ==
Parsons farmed pigs. They bought bulk food storage hoppers from Uttley Ingham, who installed them on the farm. The ventilator top was not unsealed as it should have been when it was installed. Parsons did not notice this (it was 28 feet high). The pignuts became mouldy. Parsons saw this, but thought it would do them no harm. 254 pigs died from E. coli. Parsons sued Uttley Ingham for damages for loss of the pigs and trading profits.

== Judgment ==
The Court of Appeal all held that the loss was not too remote. But the majority, Scarman LJ and Orr LJ held that the type of loss rather than the actual loss is relevant when applying the contract remoteness test. Scarman LJ agreed that it would be absurd if the test generally was different in contract or tort – just because of the cause of action. Lord Denning MR (dissenting on the reasoning) would have held that a distinction should be drawn in contract between loss of profit and physical damage. He relied on Hart and Honoré to say that a distinction between economic loss and physical damage is ‘emerging’ in contract, like in tort. For economic losses, it should have been foreseen as a ‘serious possibility’. For physical damage, there should be compensation if there is only a ‘slight possibility’.

== See also ==
- Hadley v Baxendale
- Victoria Laundry (Windsor) Ltd v Newman Industries Ltd [1948] 2 KB 528
- Koufos v Czarnikow Ltd or The Heron II [1969] 1 AC 350
- South Australia Asset Management Co v York Montague [1996] 3 All ER 365
- The Achilleas [2008] UKHL 48
