= Pure economic loss =

Financial loss independent of physical damage

Economic loss is a term of art which refers to financial loss and damage suffered by a person which is seen only on a balance sheet and not as physical injury to person or property. There is a fundamental distinction between pure economic loss and consequential economic loss, as pure economic loss occurs independent of any physical damage to the person or property of the victim. It has also been suggested that this tort should be called "commercial loss" as injuries to person or property can be regarded as "economic".

Examples of pure economic loss include the following:

- Loss of income suffered by a family whose principal earner dies in an accident. The physical injury is caused to the deceased, not the family.
- Loss of market value of a property owing to the inadequate specifications of foundations by an architect.
- Loss of production suffered by an enterprise whose electricity supply is interrupted by a contractor excavating a public utility.

The latter case is exemplified by the English case of Spartan Steel and Alloys Ltd v Martin & Co Ltd. Similar losses are also restricted in German law, though not in French law beyond the normal requirements that a claimant's asserted loss must be certain and directly caused.

== Common law jurisdictions ==
Recovery at law for pure economic loss is restricted under some circumstances in some jurisdictions, in particular in tort in common law jurisdictions, for fear that it is potentially unlimited and could represent a "crushing liability" against which parties would find it impossible to insure.

=== Australia ===
In Australia, the general rule is that damages for economic loss which are not consequential upon damage to person or property are not recoverable in negligence even if the loss is foreseeable. Economic loss may be recoverable in cases where the plaintiff can prove an assumption of responsibility by the defendant and known reliance on the defendant by the plaintiff, or vulnerability in the sense of the inability of the plaintiff to take steps to protect itself from the risk of the loss.

Cases in which the High Court has held that economic loss was recoverable include:

- Caltex Oil (Australia) Pty Ltd v The Dredge 'Willemstad' (1976), in which Caltex was permitted to recover the economic loss it suffered when a dredge severed an oil pipeline. Caltex was not directly affected by the loss of the oil, because that risk was borne by another company, but it suffered loss in obtaining oil by another means of transport while the pipeline was repaired. The loss was recoverable because the defendants knew or should have known that Caltex would suffer it.
- Bryan v Maloney (1995), in which the purchaser of a home was entitled to compensation from the builder for latent defects. Because compensation for the defects would have been recoverable by the landowner who originally engaged the builder, the subsequent purchaser enjoyed similar rights. (In contrast, the builders in Woolcock Street Investments Pty Ltd v CDG Pty Ltd and Brookfield Multiplex Ltd v Owners Corporation Strata Plan 61288 owed no duty of care to the original landowner, and were therefore not liable to subsequent owners when latent defects were revealed.)
- Hill v Van Erp (1997), in which a solicitor was liable to an intended beneficiary when a deceased testator's gift was ineffective as a result of the solicitor's negligence.
- Perre v Apand Pty Ltd (1999), in which an agricultural company negligently introduced bacterial wilt onto a potato farm and was liable to neighbouring farmers whose crops were not affected by the disease, but could not be sold as a result of regulations prohibiting the sale of potatoes grown within a 20 km radius of an outbreak.

=== Canada ===
Justice Cardozo's indeterminacy concerns were relied on by the Supreme Court of Canada to restrict imposing liability on a corporation's auditors for negligently auditing the corporation's financial statements in Hercules Management v Ernst & Young, [1997] 2 SCR 165. The court determined that the auditors owed investors of the company a duty of care, and that the auditors had been negligent in conducting their audit. However, La Forest J, writing for a unanimous court, declined to impose liability on the auditors for policy reasons, citing Justice Cardozo's concerns over indeterminate liability.

=== England and Wales ===
Pure economic loss was not recoverable in negligence until 1963 and the decision of the House of Lords in Hedley Byrne & Co Ltd v Heller & Partners Ltd (1964). Up until Hedley Byrne was decided, pure economic loss was thought to be entirely within the realm of contract law. From that point on, in jurisdictions following the English common law, it has been possible to recover for some pure economic loss in negligence; however, because purely economic loss can usually be anticipated and allocated differently by contract, the party seeking to be compensated for such loss must demonstrate a compelling reason to change the contractual allocation through tort liability.

=== Malaysia ===
In Malaysia, the Federal Court in Majlis Perbandaran Ampang v Steven Phoa Cheng Loon [2006] 2 AMR 563 followed the decision in Caparo Industries v Dickman [1990] UKHL 2 where it held; pure economic loss is claimable if 1) the damage was foreseeable, 2) the relationship between the parties was one of sufficient proximity, and 3) it is fair, just and reasonable to impose a duty of care on the defendant.

In the case of Tenaga Nasional Malaysia v Batu Kemas Industri Sdn Bhd & Anor Appeal [2018] 6 CLJ 683, the Federal Court has reaffirmed the position of the Caparo's three-fold test. However, the Court also stressed that the third element shall only be relevant in new and novel cases. In well-established cases such as economic loss, the third element is inapplicable and the Court must adhere to precedents.

=== United States ===
In the United States, Chief Judge Benjamin N. Cardozo of the New York Court of Appeals famously described pure economic loss as "liability in an indeterminate amount, for an indeterminate time, to an indeterminate class". The product liability form of the rule (i.e., that there is no recovery for pure economic loss under a theory of strict product liability) can be traced back to Roger Traynor's decision in the California case Seely v. White Motor Co. (1965), which was later adopted by the Supreme Court of the United States in East River Steamship Corp v. Transamerica Delaval Inc. (1986).

A few state supreme courts in the United States have departed from the majority rule and authorized recovery for pure economic loss through tort causes of action (usually negligence). The first was California in 1979, followed later by New Jersey and Alaska. Legal scholars in the United States, such as Jacob Chabot, have also begun to question the majority rule, observing that indeterminate liability cannot truly ground the rule because of its many exceptions and concluding that departure from the rule would be desirable.

== Civil law jurisdictions ==
=== Germany ===
The general rule of tort liability under German law is supplied by section 823 of the Bürgerliches Gesetzbuch (BGB), which does not provide for damages for pure economic loss. However, the courts have interpreted BGB provisions imposing liability for harms caused by actions contrary to public policy or statute to allow for pure economic loss damages.

Contractual liability for pure economic loss is recognized in German law. As a result, German courts have often turned to a contract theory to impose liability. Such liability may be imposed even without privity of contract.

In addition, liability for pure economic loss may be imposed under German law in the case of special relationships, such as the relationship of a guardian to a ward, in which the guardian may be subject to liability for pure economic loss if the guardian is at fault.

=== Sweden ===
Sweden adopted general principles of tort liability for the first time in 1972 with the adoption of the Tort Liability Act (skadeståndslagen, SKL). Previously, liability had been largely confined to cases in which a crime had been committed. Under the SKL, that limitation continues to apply in cases involving pure economic loss: it is available only when a crime has been committed. However, in more recent decades, some Swedish court decisions have allowed damages for pure economic loss in exceptional circumstances even when there is no underlying crime.

== See also ==
- Consequential damages
- Lost sales
- Muirhead v Industrial Tank Specialist Ltd
- Opportunity cost

== Bibliography ==
- Bishop, W. (1982). "Economic loss in tort". Oxford Journal of Legal Studies. 2 (1): 1–29. doi:10.1093/ojls/2.1.1.
- W. H. van Boom; Helmut Koziol; Christian A. Witting (2004). Pure economic loss. Springer. p. 115. ISBN 9783211005149.
- Bussani, Mauro; Palmer, Vernon (2003). Pure economic loss in Europe. Cambridge University Press. ISBN 9781139438629.
- Giliker, P. (2005). "Revisiting pure economic loss: lessons to be learnt from the Supreme Court of Canada?". Legal Studies. 25 (1): 49–71. doi:10.1111/j.1748-121X.2005.tb00270.x. S2CID 144517741.
- Lunney, M. & Oliphant, K. (2003). Tort Law: Text and Materials (2nd ed.). Oxford: Oxford University Press. pp. pp 339–423. ISBN 0-19-926055-9.
- Stapleton, J. (1991). "Duty of care and economic loss: a wider agenda". Law Quarterly Review. 107: 249.
- Stapleton, J. (2002). "Pure economic loss: lessons from case-law-focused 'middle theory'". UCLA Law Review. 50: 531.
- van Gerven, W; et al., eds. (2001). Cases, Materials and Text on National, Supranational and International Tort Law. Oxford: Hart Publishing. ISBN 1-84113-139-3.
- Weinrib, E. J. (2005) "The disintegration of duty", in Madden, M. S. Exploring Tort Law, London: Cambridge University Press, pp. 143–272 ISBN 978-0521851367
