= Rionda =

Rionda may refer to:

== People with the surname ==
- Bernie de la Rionda (born 1957), Cuban-born American attorney.
- Luis Alberto Pérez-Rionda (born 1969), Cuban sprinter.
- Manuel Rionda (1854-1943), Spanish-born, US-based sugar baron in Cuba.
- Sasha Rionda (born 1977), Mexican actress.
