= Winner v SMT (Eastern) Ltd =

- Court: Judicial Committee of the Privy Council
- Decided: 22 February 1954
- Citation: 1954 UKPC 8

Case history
- Prior actions: Winner v. S.M.T. (Eastern) Ltd., 1951 CanLII 2, [1951] SCR 887 (22 October 1951), reversing a decision of the Supreme Court of New Brunswick, Appeal Division, (1950) 26 MPR 27
- Appealed from: Supreme Court of Canada

Court membership
- Judges sitting: Lord Porter, Lord Oaksey, Lord Tucker, Lord Asquith of Bishopstone and Lord Cohen

Case opinions
- Decision by: Lord Porter

Winner v SMT (Eastern) Ltd is the last case of the Judicial Committee of the Privy Council that affected Canadian constitutional jurisprudence. The Supreme Court of Canada case, from which it arose, is also notable for summarizing the essence of Canadian citizenship.

== Background ==
Israel Winner (operating as Mackenzie Coach Lines) operated a bus service between Boston and Glace Bay, Nova Scotia. In addition to authority granted by the Interstate Commerce Commission for that part of the service from Boston to Calais, Maine, he applied to the New Brunswick Motor Carrier Board for authority to operate his service in that province. The Board issued a permit, subject to the condition that Winner would not pick up or drop off any passengers within the province. S.M.T. (Eastern) Limited was a New Brunswick company that held a permit from the Board that entitled it to carry passengers from Saint Stephen, New Brunswick via Saint John to the Nova Scotia border.

Winner contended that the Board did not have the authority to attach such a condition to his permit, and it also did not have the power to prevent him from picking up and dropping off passengers travelling within the province. S.M.T. (Eastern) Limited applied to the Supreme Court of New Brunswick, Chancery Division, for an injunction restraining such activity.

== The courts below ==
Hughes J of the Chancery Division declined to issue an injunction until the Appellate Division gave him answers to the following questions:

1. Are the operations or proposed operations of the defendant within the Province of New Brunswick, or any part or parts thereof as above set forth, prohibited or in any way affected by the provisions of The Motor Carrier Act, 1937 and amendments thereto, or orders made by the said Motor Carrier Board?
2. Is 13 George VI, c. 47 (1949) [which extended the scope of the Board's permits to include points outside the province] intra vires of the Legislature of the Province of New Brunswick?
3. Are the proposed operations prohibited or in any way affected by Regulation 13 of The Motor Vehicle Act, c. 20 of the Acts of 1934 and amendments, or under sections 6 or 53 or any other sections of The Motor Vehicle Act?

The Appellate Division answered thus:

1. Yes, prohibited, until the Defendant complies with the provisions of the Act.
2. Yes, in respect of this Defendant.
3. Yes, until the Defendant complies with the provisions of the Act, and the Regulations made thereunder.

Winner appealed.

=== At the Supreme Court of Canada ===
Appeal was allowed. In an 8–1 decision the Court held that Winner was entitled to pick up and drop off passengers that were on an international or interprovincial journey, but not with regard to journeys between points within the province.

For his part, Rinfret CJ answered that the New Brunswick Act and Regulation did not prohibit Winner's operations, and the conditions that the Board had attached to its permit were ultra vires.

The nature of Canadian citizenship

In his opinion, Rand J. observed that citizens were free to move across provincial borders and live wherever they chose to, and only the federal government could limit this right:

What this implies is that a province cannot, by depriving a Canadian of the means of working, force him to leave it: it cannot divest him of his right or capacity to remain and to engage in work there: that capacity inhering as a constituent element of his citizenship status is beyond nullification by provincial action. The contrary view would involve the anomaly that although British Columbia could not by mere prohibition deprive a naturalized foreigner of his means of livelihood, it could do so to a native-born Canadian. He may, of course, disable himself from exercising his capacity or he may be regulated in it by valid provincial law in other aspects. But that attribute of citizenship lies outside of those civil rights committed to the province, and is analogous to the capacity of a Dominion corporation which the province cannot sterilize.

It follows, a fortiori, that a province cannot prevent a Canadian from entering it except, conceivably, in temporary circumstances, for some local reason as, for example, health. With such a prohibitory power, the country could be converted into a number of enclaves and the "union" which the original provinces sought and obtained disrupted. In a like position is a subject of a friendly foreign country; for practical purposes he enjoys all the rights of the citizen.

Such, then, is the national status embodying certain inherent or constitutive characteristics, of members of the Canadian public, and it can be modified, defeated or destroyed, as for instance by outlawry, only by Parliament.

Appeal and cross-appeal

The Attorney General of Ontario sought leave to appeal the part of the decision that allowed the picking up and dropping of passengers in the province, whether the journey began or ended inside or outside the province. Winner cross-appealed against the prohibition of purely intraprovincial traffic.

== At the Privy Council ==
The appeal was dismissed, and the cross-appeal was allowed. In his opinion, Lord Porter held that this case fell within the same scope as that of the Radio Reference in determining the nature of works and undertakings and under which jurisdiction they fall. As Winner was carrying on an undertaking connecting New Brunswick with both Nova Scotia and Maine, there exists an undertaking connecting province with province and beyond the limits of the province. Therefore, it was an undertaking that fell within federal jurisdiction, and it was one and indivisible.

It was also argued that the province could regulate who could use its roads. While the Board agreed that such jurisdiction did exist, it was limited and could not interfere with connecting undertakings. As Lord Porter declared:

It must be remembered that it is the undertaking not the roads which comes within the jurisdiction of the Dominion, but legislation which denies the use of provincial roads to such an undertaking or sterilizes the undertaking itself is an interference with the prerogative of the Dominion.

== Impact ==
Winner effectively placed all commercial interprovincial and international motor vehicle traffic under federal jurisdiction.

Rand J's comments relating to mobility rights of Canadians, while obiter in this case, have significantly affected Canadian jurisprudence.
