= Hadley v Baxendale =

English contract law case

Hadley & Anor v Baxendale & Ors
- Court: Exchequer Court
- Decided: 23 February 1854
- Citations: [1854] EWHC J70, (1854) 156 ER 145, 9 ExCh 341, (1854) 23 LJ Ex 179, 18 Jur 358, [1843-60] All ER Rep 461
- Transcript: Abridged judgment on bailii.org

Court membership
- Judges sitting: Parke B, Alderson B, Platt B and Martin B

Keywords
- Breach of contract, remoteness

Hadley & Anor v Baxendale & Ors [1854] EWHC J70 is a leading English contract law case. It sets the leading rule to determine consequential damages from a breach of contract: a breaching party is liable for all losses that the contracting parties should have foreseen. However, if the other party has special knowledge that the party-in-breach does not, the breaching party is only liable for the losses that he could have foreseen on the information available to them.

== Facts ==
The claimants, Mr Hadley and another, were millers and mealmen and worked together in a partnership. A crankshaft of a steam engine at the mill had broken and Hadley arranged to have a new one made by W. Joyce & Co. in Greenwich. Before the new crankshaft could be made, W. Joyce & Co. required that the broken crankshaft be sent to them in order to ensure that the new crankshaft would fit together properly with the other parts of the steam engine. Hadley contracted with defendants Baxendale and others to deliver the crankshaft to engineers for repair by a certain date at a cost of £2 sterling and 4 shillings.

Baxendale failed to deliver on the date in question, causing Hadley to lose business. Hadley sued for the profits he lost due to Baxendale's late delivery, and the jury awarded Hadley damages of £50. Baxendale appealed, contending that he did not know that Hadley would suffer any particular damage by reason of the late delivery.

The question raised by the appeal in this case was whether a defendant in a breach of contract case could be held liable for damages that the defendant was not aware would be incurred from a breach of the contract.

== Judgment ==
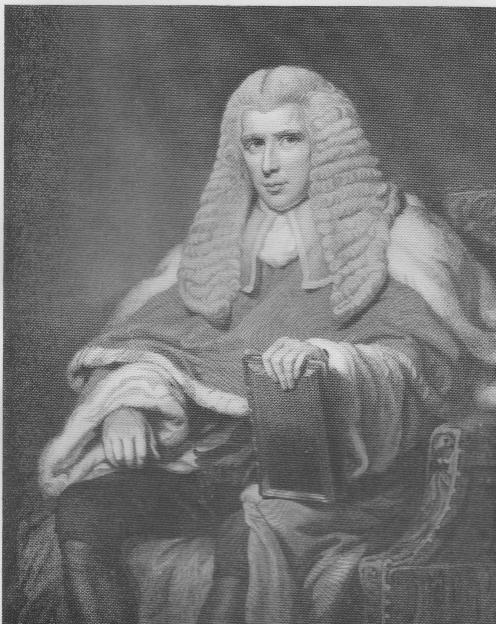
Baron Alderson

The Court of Exchequer, led by Baron Sir Edward Hall Alderson, declined to allow Hadley to recover lost profits, holding that Baxendale could be held liable only for losses that were generally foreseeable, or if Hadley had mentioned his special circumstances in advance. The mere fact that a party is sending something to be repaired does not indicate that the party would lose profits if it is not delivered on time. The court suggested various other circumstances under which Hadley could have entered into this contract that would not have presented such dire circumstances, and noted that where special circumstances exist, provisions can be made in the contract voluntarily entered into by the parties to impose extra damages for a breach. Alderson B said the following:

Now we think the proper rule in such a case as the present is this: Where two parties have made a contract which one of them has broken, the damages which the other party ought to receive in respect of such breach of contract should be such as may fairly and reasonably be considered either arising naturally, i.e., according to the usual course of things, from such breach of contract itself, or such as may reasonably be supposed to have been in the contemplation of both parties, at the time they made the contract, as the probable result of the breach of it. Now, if the special circumstances under which the contract was actually made were communicated by the plaintiffs to the defendants, and thus known to both parties, the damages resulting from the breach of such a contract, which they would reasonably contemplate, would be the amount of injury which would ordinarily follow from a breach of contract under these special circumstances so known and communicated. But, on the other hand, if these special circumstances were wholly unknown to the party breaking the contract, he, at the most, could only be supposed to have had in his contemplation the amount of injury which would arise generally, and in the great multitude of cases not affected by any special circumstances, from such a breach of contract. For, had the special circumstances been known, the parties might have specially provided for the breach of contract by special terms as to the damages in that case, and of this advantage it would be very unjust to deprive them. Now the above principles are those by which we think the jury ought to be guided in estimating the damages arising out of any breach of contract... But it is obvious that, in the great multitude of cases of millers sending off broken shafts to third persons by a carrier under ordinary circumstances, such consequences would not, in all probability, have occurred, and these special circumstances were here never communicated by the plaintiffs to the defendants. It follows, therefore, that the loss of profits here cannot reasonably be considered such a consequence of the breach of contract as could have been fairly and reasonably contemplated by both the parties when they made this contract.

== Significance ==
L. L. Fuller and William R. Perdue evaluated the idea of reducing contractual remoteness to foreseeability in this way:

Hadley v Baxendale may be regarded as giving a grossly simplified answer to the question which its first aspect presents. To the question, how far shall we go in charging to the defaulting promisor the consequences of his breach, it answers with what purports to be a single test, that of foreseeability. The simplicity and comprehensiveness of this test are largely a matter of illusion. In the first place, it is openly branded as inappropriate in certain situations where the line is drawn much more closely in favor of the defaulting promisor than the test of foreseeability as normally understood would draw it. There are, therefore, exceptions to the test, to say nothing of authorities which reject it altogether as too burdensome to the defaulter. In the second place, it is clear that the test of foreseeability is less a definite test itself than a cover for a developing set of tests. As in the case of all "reasonable man" standards there is an element of circularity about the test of foreseeability. "For what items of damage should the court hold the defaulting promisor? Those which he should as a reasonable man have foreseen. But what should he have foreseen as a reasonable man? Those items of damage for which the court feels he ought to pay." The test of foreseeability is therefore subject to manipulation by the simple device of defining the characteristics of the hypothetical man who is doing the foreseeing. By a gradual process of judicial inclusion and exclusion this "man" acquires a complex personality; we begin to know just what "he" can "foresee" in this and that situation, and we end, not with one test but with a whole set of tests. This has obviously happened in the law of negligence, and it is happening, although less obviously, to the reasonable man postulated by Hadley v. Baxendale.

As early as 1894, the U.S. Supreme Court recognized the influence of Hadley upon American law:

In Hadley v. Baxendale (1854) 9 Exch. 345, ever since considered a leading case on both sides of the Atlantic, and approved and followed by this court in Telegraph Co. v. Hall, above cited, and in Howard v. Manufacturing Co., 139 U.S. 199, 206, 207 S., 11 Sup. Ct. 500; Baron Alderson laid down ... the principles by which the jury ought to be guided in estimating the damages arising out of any breach of contract[.]

The Hadley holding was later incorporated into Section 351 of the Restatement (Second) of Contracts. A 1994 law review article noted that as of that year, Hadley had been cited with approval by the state supreme courts of 43 U.S. states; three state supreme courts had adopted the Hadley holding without citing Hadley itself; and intermediate appellate courts in the four other states had also favorably cited Hadley.

In England and Wales, section 53(2) of the Sale of Goods Act 1979 articulates the first limb of Hadley, [t]he measure of damages for breach of warranty is the estimated loss directly and naturally resulting, in the ordinary course of events, from the breach of warranty, while section 53(4), The fact that the buyer has set up the breach of warranty in diminution or extinction of the price does not prevent him from maintaining an action for the same breach of warranty if he has suffered further damage, allows for "special damages", articulating the second limb.

In Satef-Huttenes Albertus SpA v Paloma Tercera Shipping Co SA (The Pegase) [1981] 1 Lloyd’s Rep 175, Robert Goff J stated,

Although the principle stated in Hadley v Baxendale remains the fons et origo of the modern law, the principle itself has been analysed and developed, and its application broadened, in the 20th century ... The general result of the two cases is that the principle in Hadley v Baxendale is now no longer stated in terms of two rules, but rather in terms of a single principle—though it is recognised that the application of the principle may depend on the degree of relevant knowledge held by the defendant at the time of the contract in the particular case. This approach accords very much to what actually happens in practice; the courts have not been over-ready to pigeon-hole the cases under one or other of the so-called rules in Hadley v Baxendale, but rather to decide each case on the basis of the relevant knowledge of the defendant.

However, it has been suggested that the rule in Hadley v Baxendale is not as novel as its celebrated importance suggests. James Edelman, a Justice of the High Court of Australia gave a speech on the topic, asserting that "the rule set out in Hadley v Baxendale was not novel". For example, Edelman noted that, in 1564, the French jurist Charles Dumoulin had argued that liability for breach of contract should be limited to foreseeable damage, thereby pre-dating this same sentiment in Hadley v Baxendale.

The core of the judgment below is often cited as an example of a combination of the objective test and a subjective test:

Where two parties have made a contract which one of them has broken, the damages which the other party ought to receive in respect of such breach of contract should be such as may fairly and reasonably be considered either arising naturally, i.e., according to the usual course of things, from such breach of contract itself, or such as may reasonably be supposed to have been in the contemplation of both parties, at the time they made the contract, as the probable result of the breach of it.

== See also ==
- Victoria Laundry (Windsor) Ltd v Newman Industries Ltd [1948] 2 KB 528
- Koufos v Czarnikow Ltd or The Heron II [1969] 1 AC 350
- Parsons (Livestock) Ltd v Uttley Ingham & Co Ltd [1978] 1 QB 791
- South Australia Asset Management Co v York Montague [1996] 3 All ER 365
- Jackson v Royal Bank of Scotland [2005] 2 All ER 71
- The Achilleas [2008] UKHL 48
