= Spartan Steel & Alloys Ltd v Martin & Co (Contractors) Ltd =

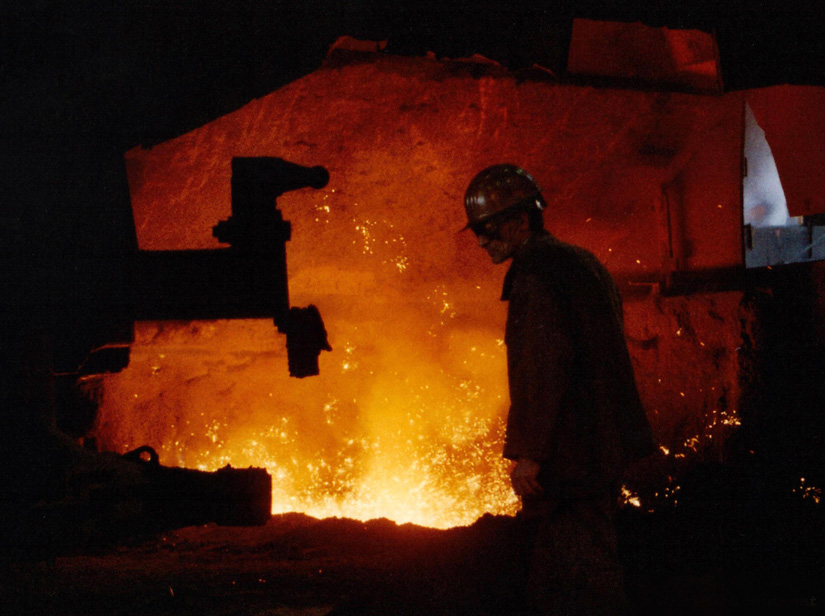
- Court: Court of Appeal
- Citation: [1973] QB 27, [1972] 3 All ER 557, [1972] 3 WLR 502

Court membership
- Judges sitting: Lord Denning MR; Edmund Davies LJ; Lawton LJ

Keywords
- Pure economic loss, negligence

Spartan Steel & Alloys Ltd v Martin & Co (Contractors) Ltd [1972] EWCA Civ 3 is a well-known English Court of Appeal case concerning the recovery of pure economic loss in negligence.

== Facts ==
Spartan Steel and Alloys Ltd had a stainless steel factory in Birmingham, which obtained its electricity by a direct cable from the power station. Martin & Co Ltd were doing work on the ground with an excavator and negligently damaged that cable (Spartan Steel did not own the cable). As a consequence, the factory was deprived of electricity for 15 hours which caused physical damage to the factory’s furnaces and metal, loss of profit on the damaged metal and loss of profit on the metal that was not melted during the time the electricity was off. Spartan Steel claimed all the three heads of damage.

== Judgment ==
The Court of Appeal, consisting of Lord Denning MR, Edmund-Davies LJ and Lawton LJ delivered a majority judgment (Edmund-Davies LJ dissenting), that the Spartan Steel could only recover the damages to their furnaces, the metal they had to discard and the profit lost on the discarded metal. They could not recover the profits lost due to the factory not being operational for 14.5 hours. Their main reasoning for this was that while the metal's physical damage and the lost profits was "directly consequential" upon the damage, the profits lost due to the blackout constituted "pure economic loss".

Although the majority seemed to agree that Martin & Co Ltd owed the Spartan Steel a duty of care and the damage was not too remote since it was foreseeable, they declined to allow the recovery of pure economic loss for policy reasons outlined by Lord Denning in his leading judgment.

The plaintiffs claim all those sums as damages against the contractors for negligence. No evidence was given at the trial: because the defendants admitted that they had been negligent. The contest was solely on the amount of damages. The defendants take their stand on the recent decision in this court of SCM (United Kingdom) Ltd v WJ Whittall & Son Ltd [1971] 1 QB 337. They admit that they are liable for the £368 physical damages. They did not greatly dispute that they are also liable for the £400 loss of profit on the first melt, because that was truly consequential on the physical damages and thus covered by SCM (United Kingdom) Ltd v WJ Whittall & Son Ltd. But they deny that they are liable for the £1,767 for the other four melts. They say that was economic loss for which they are not liable. Felix J rejected their contention and held them liable for all the loss. The defendants appeal to this court.

Mr. Christopher Bathurst, for the plaintiffs, raised a point which was not discussed in SCM (United Kingdom) Ltd v WJ Whittall & Son Ltd. He contended that there was a principle of English law relating to "parasitic damages." By this he meant that there are some heads of damage which, if they stood alone, would not be recoverable: but, nevertheless, if they can be annexed to some other legitimate claim for damages, may yet be recoverable. They are said to be "parasitic" because, like a parasite, in biology, they cannot exist on their own, but depend on others for their life and nourishment. Applying this principle he contended that, even if the economic loss (£1,767) on these four melts, standing alone, would not be recoverable, nevertheless by being attached to the other claim it can be added to it, and recovered as a "parasite" to it.

Mr. Bathurst sought to establish this principle by reference to the books. He cited a case where the owner of an old house was entitled to ancient lights for some small old windows. He pulled down the old house and put up a new house with big new windows. The defendants afterwards put up a building which obstructed the big new windows. The plaintiff was held entitled to be compensated for the loss of light through the whole space of the big new windows and not merely through the little space of the small old windows: see In re London, Tilbury & Southend Railway Co and Trustees of Gower's Walk Schools (1889) 24 QBD 326 . That decision was considered in Horton v Colwyn Bay and Colwyn Urban District Council [1908] 1 K.B. 327, and Buckley L.J. drew from it a general proposition which he stated to be, at p. 341:

"... if an actionable wrong has been done to the claimant he is entitled to recover all the damage resulting from that wrong, and none the less because he would have had no right of action for some part of the damage if the wrong had not also created a damage which was actionable."

In a similar case relating to ancient lights, a similar result was reached: see Griffith v Richard Clay & Sons Ltd [1912] 2 Ch 291.

Mr Bathurst drew our attention to a number of other cases in which, he said, the same principle was applied, although it was not expressly stated in them.

I do not like this doctrine of "parasitic damages." I do not like the very word "parasite." A "parasite" is one who is a useless hanger-on sucking the substance out of others. "Parasitic" is the adjective derived from it. It is a term of abuse. It is an opprobrious epithet. The phrase "parasitic damages" conveys to my mind the idea of damages which ought not in justice to be awarded, but which somehow or other have been allowed to get through by hanging on to others. If such be the concept underlying the doctrine, then the sooner it is got rid of the better. It has never been used in any case up till now. It has only appeared hitherto in the textbooks. I hope it will disappear from them after this case.

I do not believe there is any such doctrine. The cases on ancient lights stand in a category by themselves and are to be explained in this way: if a house has ancient lights which are threatened by a new building, the owner, if he moves promptly, may obtain an injunction to restrain the erection of the new building. The court, however, may refuse an injunction and award him damages in lieu of an injunction: see Leeds Industrial Cooperative Society Ltd v Slack [1924] AC 851 . These damages would be, in effect buying a right to put up the new building. If the owner, however, delays and allows the new building to go up without making any objection - so that he cannot seek an injunction - I do not think he should recover damages for his big new windows (for which he has no right). He ought only to recover damages for the small old windows (for which he has a right).

None of the other cases gives any difficulty. In all of them there was some good reason for adding on the extra damages - not because they were improper, but because they flowed naturally and directly from the wrong done and could reasonably have been foreseen as a consequence of it.

I reject, therefore, Mr. Bathurst's argument based on "parasitic" damages.

Mr. Bathurst submitted in the alternative that the views expressed by Winn L.J. and me in SCM (United Kingdom) Ltd v WJ Whittall & Son Ltd [1971] 1 QB 337 were wrong. He said that if there was any limitation on the recovery of economic loss, it was to be found by restricting the sphere of duty, and not by limiting the type of damages recoverable. In this present case, he said, the defendants admittedly were under a duty to the plaintiffs and had broken it. The damages by way of economic loss were foreseeable, and, therefore, they should be recoverable. He cited several statements from the books in support of his submissions, including some by myself.

At bottom I think the question of recovering economic loss is one of policy. Whenever the courts draw a line to mark out the bounds of duty, they do it as matter of policy so as to limit the responsibility of the defendant. Whenever the courts set bounds to the damages recoverable - saying that they are, or are not, too remote - they do it as matter of policy so as to limit the liability of the defendant.

In many of the cases where economic loss has been held not to be recoverable, it has been put on the ground that the defendant was under no duty to the plaintiff. Thus where a person is injured in a road accident by the negligence of another, the negligent driver owes a duty to the injured man himself, but he owes no duty to the servant of the injured man - see Best v Samuel Fox & Co Ltd [1952] AC 716, 731: nor to the master of the injured man - Inland Revenue Commissioners v Hambrook [1956] 2 QB 641, 660: nor to anyone else who suffers loss because he had a contract with the injured man - see Simpson & Co v Thomson (1877) 3 App Cas 279, 289: nor indeed to anyone who only suffers economic loss on account of the accident: see Kirkham v Boughey [1958] 2 Q.B. 338, 341. Likewise, when property is damaged by the negligence of another, the negligent tortfeasor owes a duty to the owner or possessor of the chattel, but not to one who suffers loss only because he had a contract entitling him to use the chattel or giving him a right to receive it at some later date: see Elliott Steam Tug Co Ltd v Shipping Controller [1922] 1 KB 127, 139 and Margarine Union GmbH v Cambay Prince Steamship Co Ltd [1969] 1 QB 219, 251-252.

In other cases, however, the defendant seems clearly to have been under a duty to the plaintiff, but the economic loss has not been recovered because it is too remote. Take the illustration given by Blackburn J in Cattle v Stockton Waterworks Co (1875) LR 10 QB 453, 457, when water escapes from a reservoir and floods a coal mine where many men are working. Those who had their tools or clothes destroyed could recover: but those who only lost their wages could not. Similarly, when the defendants' ship negligently sank a ship which was being towed by a tug, the owner of the tug lost his remuneration, but he could not recover it from the negligent ship: though the same duty (of navigation with reasonable care) was owed to both tug and tow: see Société Anonyme de Remorquage à Hélice v Bennetts [1911] 1 KB 243, 248. In such cases if the plaintiff or his property had been physically injured, he would have recovered: but, as he only suffered economic loss, he is held not entitled to recover. This is, I should think, because the loss is regarded by the law as too remote: see King v Phillips [1953] 1 Q.B. 429, 439-440.

On the other hand, in the cases where economic loss by itself has been held to be recoverable, it is plain that there was a duty to the plaintiff and the loss was not too remote. Such as when one ship negligently runs down another ship, and damages it, with the result that the cargo has to be discharged and reloaded. The negligent ship was already under a duty to the cargo owners: and they can recover the cost of discharging and reloading it, as it is not too remote: see Morrison Steamship Co Ltd v Greystoke Castle (Cargo Owners) [1947] AC 265. Likewise, when a banker negligently gives a reference to one who acts on it, the duty is plain and the damage is not too remote: see Hedley Byrne & Co Ltd v Heller & Partners Ltd [1964] AC 465.

The more I think about these cases, the more difficult I find it to put each into its proper pigeon-hole. Sometimes I say: "There was no duty." In others I say: "The damage was too remote." So much so that I think the time has come to discard those tests which have proved so elusive. It seems to me better to consider the particular relationship in hand, and see whether or not, as a matter of policy, economic loss should be recoverable, or not. Thus in Weller & Co v Foot and Mouth Disease Research Institute [1966] 1 QB 569 it was plain that the loss suffered by the auctioneers was not recoverable, no matter whether it is put on the ground that there was no duty or that the damage was too remote. Again in Electrochrome Ltd v Welsh Plastics Ltd [1968] 2 All ER 205, it is plain that the economic loss suffered by the plaintiffs' factory (due to the damage to the fire hydrant) was not recoverable, whether because there was no duty or that it was too remote.

So I turn to the relationship in the present case. It is of common occurrence. The parties concerned are: the electricity board who are under a statutory duty to maintain supplies of electricity in their district; the inhabitants of the district, including this factory, who are entitled by statute to a continuous supply of electricity for their use; and the contractors who dig up the road. Similar relationships occur with other statutory bodies, such as gas and water undertakings. The cable may be damaged by the negligence of the statutory undertaker, or by the negligence of the contractor, or by accident without any negligence by anyone: and the power may have to be cut off whilst the cable is repaired. Or the power may be cut off owing to a short-circuit in the power house: and so forth. If the cutting off of the supply causes economic loss to the consumers, should it as matter of policy be recoverable? and against whom?

The first consideration is the position of the statutory undertakers. If the board do not keep up the voltage or pressure of electricity, gas or waterer, likewise, if they shut it off for repairs - and thereby cause economic loss to their consumers, they are not liable in damages, not even if the cause of it is due to their own negligence. The only remedy (which is hardly ever pursued) is to prosecute the board before the magistrates. Such is the result of many cases, starting with a water board - Atkinson v Newcastle & Gateshead Waterworks Co (1877) 2 Ex.D. 441; going on to a gas board - Clegg, Parkinson & Co v Earby Gas Co [1896] 1 Q.B. 592; and then to an electricity company - Stevens v Aldershot Gas, Water & District Lighting Co Ltd best reported in (1932) 31 LGR 48; also in 102 LJKB 12. In those cases the courts, looking at the legislative enactments, held that Parliament did not intend to expose the board to liability for damages to the inhabitants en masse: see what Lord Cairns L.C. said in Atkinson v Newcastle & Gateshead Waterworks Co, 2 Ex.D. 441, 445 and Wills J. in Clegg, Parkinson & Co v Earby Gas Co [1896] 1 QB 592, 595. In those cases there was indirect damage to the plaintiffs, but it was not recoverable. There is another group of cases which go to show that, if the board, by their negligence in the conduct of their supply, cause direct physical damage or injury to person or property, they are liable: see Milnes v Huddersfield Corporation (1886) 11 App.Cas. 511, 530 by Lord Blackburn; Midwood & Co Ltd v Manchester Corporation [1905] 2 KB 597; Heard v Brymbo Steel Co Ltd [1947] K.B. 692 and Hartley v Mayoh & Co [1954] 1 QB 383. But one thing is clear: the statutory undertakers have never been held liable for economic loss only. If such be the policy of the legislature in regard to electricity boards, it would seem right for the common law to adopt a similar policy in regard to contractors. If the electricity boards are not liable for economic loss due to negligence which results in the cutting off the supply, nor should a contractor be liable.

The second consideration is the nature of the hazard, namely, the cutting of the supply of electricity. This is a hazard which we all run. It may be due to a short circuit, to a flash of lightning, to a tree falling on the wires, to an accidental cutting of the cable, or even to the negligence of someone or other. and when it does happen, it affects a multitude of persons: not as a rule by way of physical damage to them or their property, but by putting them to inconvenience, and sometimes to economic loss. The supply is usually restored in a few hours, so the economic loss is not very large. Such a hazard is regarded by most people as a thing they must put up with - without seeking compensation from anyone. Some there are who instal a stand-by system. Others seek refuge by taking out an insurance policy against breakdown in the supply. But most people are content to take the risk on themselves. When the supply is cut off, they do not go running round to their solicitor. They do not try to find out whether it was anyone's fault. They just put up with it. They try to make up the economic loss by doing more work next day. This is a healthy attitude which the law should encourage.

The third consideration is this: if claims for economic loss were permitted for this particular hazard, there would be no end of claims. Some might be genuine, but many might be inflated, or even false. A machine might not have been in use anyway, but it would be easy to put it down to the cut in supply. It would be well-nigh impossible to check the claims. If there was economic loss on one day, did the claimant do his best to mitigate it by working harder next day? and so forth. Rather than expose claimants to such temptation and defendants to such hard labour - on comparatively small claims - it is better to disallow economic loss altogether, at any rate when it stands alone, independent of any physical damage.

The fourth consideration is that, in such a hazard as this, the risk of economic loss should be suffered by the whole community who suffer the losses - usually many but comparatively small losses - rather than on the one pair of shoulders, that is, on the contractor on whom the total of them, all added together, might be very heavy.

The fifth consideration is that the law provides for deserving cases. If the defendant is guilty of negligence which cuts off the electricity supply and causes actual physical damage to person or property, that physical damage can be recovered: see Baker v. Crow Carrying Co. Ltd. (unreported) February 1, 1960; Bar Library Transcript No. 45, referred to by Buckley LJ in SCM (United Kingdom) Ltd v WJ Whittall & Son Ltd. [1971] 1 QB 337, 356; and also any economic loss truly consequential on the material damage: see British Celanese Ltd v AH Hunt (Capacitors) Ltd [1969] 1 WLR 959 and SCM (United Kingdom) Ltd v WJ Whittall & Son Ltd [1971] 1 QB 337. Such cases will be comparatively few. They will be readily capable of proof and will be easily checked. They should be and are admitted.

These considerations lead me to the conclusion that the plaintiffs should recover for the physical damage to the one melt (£368), and the loss of profit on that melt consequent thereon (£400): but not for the loss of profit on the four melts (£1,767), because that was economic loss independent of the physical damage. I would, therefore, allow the appeal and reduce the damages to £768.

Dissent by Edmund-Davies LJ

Edmund-Davies LJ did not agree with the majority, finding that the loss was both direct and foreseeable consequence of the defendant's negligence and should therefore be recovered. In his view, in most cases, spurious claims could be avoided either on the grounds that no duty was owed or that the damage was too remote.

== Significance ==
The judgment has outlined in very clear terms that there are two types of economic loss: economic loss consequential on physical damage and "pure" economic loss. Only the first is in principle recoverable. This has led to much litigation concerning the precise distinction between economic and physical damage as well as to disagreements when the economic loss could be seen as consequential upon physical loss.

== See also ==
- English tort law
- Negligence
- Pure economic loss
- Dominion Tape of Canada Ltd v LR McDonald& Sons Ltd [1971] 3 OR 627, 21 DLR (3d) 299 (Co. Ct.), a similar Canadian case
