= Victoria Laundry (Windsor) Ltd v Newman Industries Ltd =

1949 English case in contract law

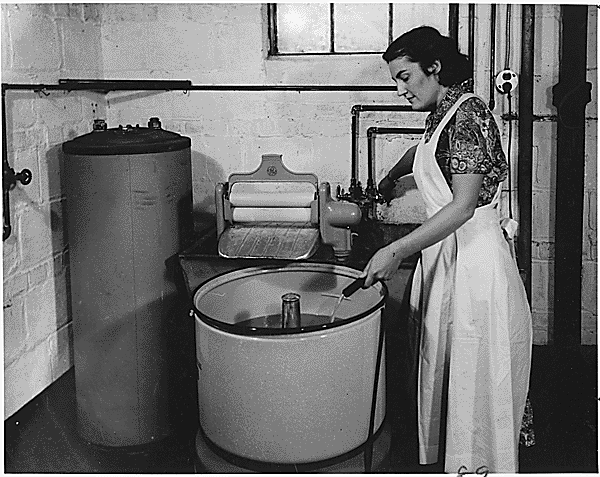
- Court: Court of Appeal
- Citation: [1949] 2 KB 528

Case opinions
- Asquith LJ

Keywords
- Remoteness

Victoria Laundry (Windsor) Ltd v Newman Industries Ltd [1949] 2 KB 528 is an English contract law case on the remoteness of damage principle.

== Facts ==
Newman Industries Ltd was meant to deliver a boiler for Victoria Laundry (Windsor) Ltd. The delivery was five months late. As a result of not having enough laundry capacity, Victoria Laundry lost a lucrative contract from the Ministry of Supply. It issued for the ordinary profit that it had forgone through not having the boiler on time. The question was whether it could also claim the extraordinary profit it would have made, had it been able to take advantage of the lucrative Ministry of Supply contract.

== Judgment ==
Asquith LJ in the Court of Appeal held that Newman Industries only had to compensate for the ordinary, not the extraordinary loss of profits. He distinguished losses from "particularly lucrative dyeing contracts" as a different type of loss which would only be recoverable if the defendant had sufficient knowledge of them to make it reasonable to attribute to him acceptance of liability for such losses. The vendor of the boilers would have regarded the profits on these contracts as a different and higher form of risk than the general risk of loss of profits by the laundry.

Lord Asquith commented further that a rule whereby the party in default granted "a complete indemnity for all loss de facto resulting from a particular breach, however improbable or however unpredictable [would be] in contract at least ... too harsh a rule".

== See also ==
- Hadley v Baxendale (1854) 9 Exch 341
- Koufos v Czarnikow Ltd or The Heron II [1969] 1 AC 350
- Parsons (Livestock) Ltd v Uttley Ingham & Co Ltd [1978] 1 QB 791
- South Australia Asset Management Co v York Montague [1996] 3 All ER 365
- The Achilleas [2008] UKHL 48
