= C Czarnikow =

British sugar broker

C. Czarnikow
- Company type: Private
- Industry: Commodities trading
- Founded: 1861
- Founder: Julius Caesar Czarnikow

C. Czarnikow was created in 1861 by Julius Caesar Czarnikow and his firm became the leading international sugar broker. Today it is jointly controlled by Associated British Foods and the Australian Macquarie Group. Czarnikow Group Limited is the largest mover of containerized white sugar in the world by volume and has offices across the globe, with the Headquarters in St Pauls in London.

== Early history ==
The firm was created by Julius Caesar Czarnikow in London in 1861 and under his guidance, it was to become a leading international sugar and produce broker. Czarnikow, generally known as Caesar, was born in October 1837 in Sondershausen, Germany. He came to England in 1854 at the age of 17 and it is believed that his first job in London was with a German produce broker. He developed good connections with the London produce brokers and by 1860 Caesar was ready to open his own firm. He first applied for naturalization and then applied to be a “sworn broker”, before the Court of Aldermen, without which he could not have traded. In 1861 he received his authorization and opened his office as what was then called a “colonial Broker”. As such he was entitled to trade as an agent but not to trade on his own account.

Caesar had been trading for little more than a year when he brought another colonial broker, H P Newton, into partnership, possibly to increase the available capital, but the partnership lasted only a few years. Of more lasting import was the recruitment of two young men in 1875: Charles Laggeman, active in the sugar trade, was also of German parentage and Julius Ganzoni, specializing in coffee, was from Switzerland. These two played an increasingly important part in the business and became Caesar's partners. They were to become, successively, Chairman of the firm after Caesar's death.

== Expansion ==
In 1871 Caesar opened a branch in Glasgow under the name of Czarnikow and Boog, the latter being the local manager. The same model was used in Liverpool a decade later with the recruitment of the local George Cox, to trade as Czarnikow and Cox. The business of the firm had been predominantly sugar but the range of product began to expand. In 1883 a cotton department was added, and in 1888 Czarnikow became a founder member of the London Produce Clearing House. Caesar himself became Deputy Chairman and from 1907, Chairman, an indication of the range of produce handled by the firm, and Czarnikow's prominence in the industry. International expansion followed in 1891 when Czarnikow opened an agency business in New York for sugar and other produce under the name Czarnikow, McDougall.

== New Management ==
Although the Produce Department dealt with a wide range of commodities, it was junior to the established sugar agency. The period after the World War I saw a sustained expansion in general produce. Rubber was added in 1918 and cocoa in 1932. Czarnikow even moved into the paper trade where it became the largest operator in the world, handling 55% of world output. In 1927 Czarnikow returned to New York forming a wholly owned Mincing Trading Company. This helped establish Czarnikow as a broker and importer of spice, joining the American Spice Trade Association in 1931. A Montreal office had been opened the previous year. Although the firm only operated as an agent, it did get indirectly caught up in the collapse of the pepper syndicate in 1935. Commenting on the collapse of one of the merchants that unsuccessfully tried to corner the pepper market, the receiver said “its capital of practically £1,000,000 has 'gone west’”. Czarnikow was one of the firms that negotiated the finance to prevent a chain reaction in the commodity markets.

As in 1914, World War II severely curtailed Czarnikow's trade, but international expansion resumed after the War. Canada saw the opening of a Toronto office in 1948, and in 1954 Czarnikow, in conjunction with the Chivers & Sons jam firm, purchased the latter's Canadian representative, F L Benedict. The Canadian business was further expanded in 1959 by the purchase of Heeney Frosted Foods and the subsequent construction of a factory for freezing vegetables, an unusual addition to Czarnikow's agency business. The post-war expansion was recognised by an increase in the authorised capital from £1m in 1951 to £2m in 1957.

== The Modern Era ==
After the publication of the firm's centenary history in 1963, little information is available for the next thirty years. An answer to a parliamentary question in June 1973 disclosed that Czarnikow ranked 16th in the country by size of turnover - £605m. A new company was formed in 1991, C Czarnikow Sugar Limited (later Czarnikow Group Limited) presumably to acquire the business of the previous Czarnikow company. Company accounts referred only to sugar trading so it is assumed that the produce trading had ceased. Early registers also showed the entry of British Sugar, the sole British producer of sugar from sugar beet, as an important shareholder. The current shareholding is 42.5% Associated British Foods (the parent company of British Sugar). 42.5% the Australian Macquarie Group and 15% the Employee Benefit Trust. The 2021 annual report describes the main activities of the group as physical trading in sugar (raw and refined), PET, dairy products, ingredients, biomass and “added-value services”; the latter included structured finance, logistics and financial advice.
