= Muirhead v Industrial Tank Specialist Ltd =

English Court of Appeal case

- Court: Court of Appeal
- Citation: [1986] QB 507

Keywords
- Pure economic loss, Negligence

Muirhead v Industrial Tank Specialties Ltd and Other [1986] QB 507 is an English Court of Appeal case concerning the recovery of pure economic loss in negligence.

== Facts ==
This case involved various defendants. The plaintiff was Robert Muirhead were fishmongers who employed defendant to supply fish tanks for the plaintiff to store lobsters.

Plaintiff had a scheme where he would buy lobsters in summer when they were cheaper and he would then sell them during the Christmas festive period when their price was more expensive. Plaintiff engaged Industrial Tank Specialties to design, supply and install a fish tank in which he (plaintiff) would store the lobsters. The tank needed an electric pump to circulate the seawater for the purpose of oxygenation.

Defendants (Industrial Tank Specialties) subcontracted the manufacture of motors for those pumps to Leroy Somer Electric Motors Ltd. Unfortunately the motors supplied were designed for use in France, where they use a lower range of voltages than those used in England.

Consequently, the pumps failed. This resulted in the death of the whole stock of lobsters from lack of oxygen, the lobsters died.

The tank company was insolvent, so the plaintiff sued the French motor manufacturer in negligence for a variety of damages.

== Judgment ==
Relying on Junior Books v. Veitchi, the court allowed a claim for economic loss and gave a judgment against the motor manufacturer for damages to be assessed on grounds 1–7. The third defendant appealed.

The Court of Appeal overturned this application of Junior Books v. Veitchi, on the ground that Junior Books depended on its own unique and particular facts, and could not be used to allow the present claim, for it was pure economic loss. The court held that the plaintiff could only recover foreseeable physical loss he had suffered and any consequential economic loss he had suffered as a direct result of that physical damage.
