= Samuel Porter, Baron Porter =

British judge (1877–1956)

The Right Honourable The Lord Porter GBE PC
- Porter in 1952 by Walter Stoneman

Lord of Appeal in Ordinary
- In office 28 March 1938 – 14 October 1954
- Preceded by: The Lord Maugham
- Succeeded by: The Viscount Simonds

Justice of the High Court
- In office 7 November 1934 – 28 March 1938
- Preceded by: None
- Succeeded by: Sir Cyril Asquith

Personal details
- Born: Samuel Lowry Porter
- Education: Emmanuel College, Cambridge

Samuel Lowry Porter, Baron Porter, GBE, PC (7 February 1877 – 13 February 1956) was a British judge who served as a Lord of Appeal in Ordinary from 1938 until 1954. He was one of the few judges promoted directly from the High Court bench to the House Lords without serving on the Court of Appeal.

== Early life and career ==
Born in Headingley, Leeds, Porter was the son of Hugh Porter (born 1877), a warehouse manager, and his wife, Mary Ellen Lowry. He was educated at the Perse School and Emmanuel College, Cambridge, where he took a third in Part I of the classical tripos in 1899 and a second in Part II of the law tripos in 1900. He also obtained a half-blue in tennis.

He was called to the bar by the Inner Temple in 1905, developing first a good general practice, then specialising in work in the Commercial Court. His legal career was interrupted by the First World War. Commissioned into the British Army, he ended the war as a captain on the general list. He was appointed MBE for his war service.

Porter was appointed King's Counsel in 1925. He was Recorder of Newcastle under Lyme from 1928 to 1932 and Recorder of Walsall from 1932 to 1934. A member of the Oxford Circuit, he served as a commissioner of assize on the South-Eastern Circuit in 1933, replacing Mr Justice Horridge who was detained by work in London.

== Judicial career ==
=== High Court ===
On 7 November 1934, he was appointed to one of the two new judgeships in the High Court of Justice created to clear congestions and arrears in the High Court, and authorised pursuant to an address from both Houses of Parliament. Assigned to the King's Bench Division, he received the customary knighthood on 23 November.

According to Harold Hanbury, "Porter's judgments in the King's Bench Division were always very sound. They were not spectacular, as he aimed at conciseness, and avoided the utterance of an unnecessary word." His Times obituary described his time in the High Court in the following terms:

Of a judicial temperament, a sound lawyer, quiet but forceful in matter, and courteous to all who came before him, he was considered by many to have been one of the ablest of the King's Bench Judges.

Though Porter did not have a high public profile, he came into prominence in 1936, when he chaired a tribunal of inquiry (whose other members were Gavin Simonds, KC and Roland Oliver, KC) appointed to investigate "whether any unauthorized disclosure was made of information to the Budget for the present year, or any use made of any such information for the purposes of private gain."

As a result of the tribunal's report, the Labour minister J. H. Thomas resigned as Secretary of State for the Colonies, as did Sir Alfred Butt, MP. The tribunal's procedure in relation to the examination of witnesses was subject to some criticism, included from Porter himself. As a result, corrective procedures were adopted for later similar inquiries.

Porter was also occasionally involved in cases which attracted public attention. For instance, in 1935, he sentenced Canadian boxer Del Fontaine to death for the murder of Hilda Meeks. The same year, he issued a bench warrant against the vaudeville actress Peggy O'Neil for failing to answer a subpoena.

=== House of Lords ===
On 28 March 1938, Porter was appointed Lord of Appeal in Ordinary, in succession to the new Lord Chancellor, Lord Maugham, without having previously served as a Lord Justice of Appeal. He was created a life peer with the title Baron Porter, of Longfield in the County of Tyrone. On 30 March, he was introduced to the House of Lords and heard his first appeal. On 1 April, he was sworn of the Privy Council.

An appeal against the conviction of William Joyce ("Lord Haw-Haw") for treason came before the Judicial Committee of the House of Lords on 13 December 1945 and was heard by Jowitt L.C., Macmillan L.J., Wright L.J., Simonds L.J, and Porter. Joyce had been convicted of treason for his war-time propaganda broadcasts from Nazi Germany, but was not a British subject, and argued that holding a British passport had not given him the right to the protection of the Crown, so he had had no duty of allegiance to it once he left the country. The House of Lords rejected this argument. In his dissenting opinion Porter found that the question of whether Joyce had had a duty of allegiance to the Crown was a question of fact for the jury to decide, and not a purely legal question for the judge.

Porter also dissented in National Anti-Vivisection Society v Inland Revenue Commissioners (1948), a leading case concerning charitable trusts.

Outside of judicial work, Porter was appointed to chair the Lord Chancellor's committee on defamation law in 1939. The committee's work was delayed as a result of World War II, not producing its report until 1948. The report's conclusions were implemented by the Defamation Act 1952. Porter was interested in international law, and was president of the International Law Association in 1946. He was also involved with wage negotiations in the coal industry.

Porter resigned as Lord of Appeal in 1954 because of ill-health, having been promoted to be a Knight Grand Cross of the Order of the British Empire (GBE) in the 1951 New Year Honours. He was succeeded by Gavin Simonds, 1st Baron Simonds, who was elevated to a viscounty on the occasion.

== Selected cases ==
=== High Court ===
- Mutual Finance Ltd v John Wetton & Sons Ltd [1937] 2 KB 389
- Lloyds Bank Ltd v Bank Of America National Trust and Savings Association [1937] 2 KB 631

=== House of Lords ===
- Duncan v Cammell, Laird & Co Ltd [1942] AC 624
- Joyce v Director of Public Prosecutions [1946] AC 347 (dissenting)
- Adams v Naylor [1946] AC 543
- National Anti-Vivisection Society v Inland Revenue Commissioners [1948] AC 31 (dissenting)
- Franklin v Minister of Town and Country Planning [1948] AC 87
- Reading v Attorney-General [1951] AC 507

=== Privy Council ===
- Commonwealth of Australia v Bank of New South Wales [1950] AC 235
- Attorney-General for Ontario v Israel Winner (t/a Mackenzie Coach Lines) [1954] AC 541

== Private life ==
Porter never married.

During the Second World War, his flat in Petty France, Westminster, was bombed, leading him to move to Emmanuel College, Cambridge, which had elected him an honorary fellow in 1937. He lived there for the remainder of his life, commuting to London by train and attending services at St Columba's Presbyterian Church, where his mother had worshipped.

Porter died at the London Clinic on 13 November 1956, having been due to serve as Treasurer of the Inner Temple in 1957. A memorial service was held at the Temple Church on 28 February 1956.
