= Reading v Attorney-General =

Reading v A-G
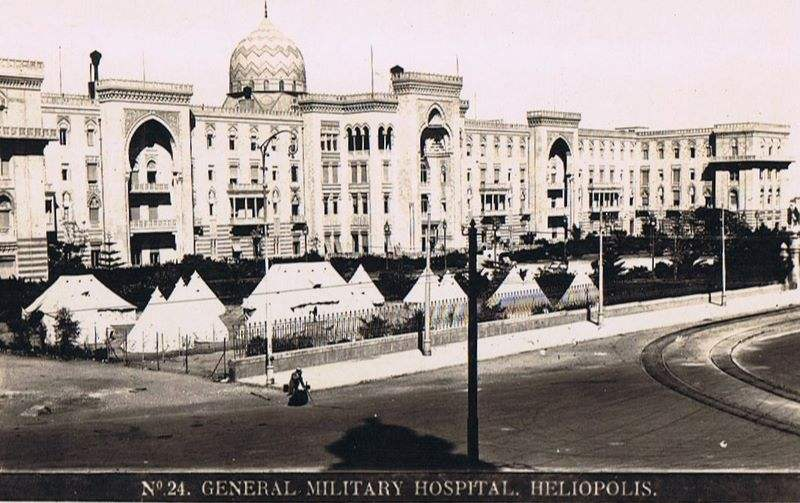
- Court: House of Lords
- Full case name: Reading v Attorney-General (on behalf of His Majesty)
- Citations: [1951] UKHL 1, [1951] AC 507

Keywords
- Constructive trust

Reading v Attorney-General [1951] AC 507; [1951] UKHL 1 is an English trusts law case, concerning constructive trusts.

== Facts ==
Mr Reading was stationed in Egypt as an army sergeant. Smugglers paid him to ride in their lorries, while they were doing their smuggling of illegal spirits (whisky and brandy), while visibly wearing his army uniform, hence making a search less likely. Mr Reading got between £1000 and £4000 each time, but was caught. The Crown seized the money he was paid, £19,325 4s 8d in total, and put him in prison. Mr Reading claimed that the money should be returned under an action for money had and received. The Crown argued it was entitled to retain the sums, which must have been received in "trust" for the Crown.

== Judgment ==
The House of Lords held that the Crown could retain the money for many reasons, including that Mr Reading was in a fiduciary position. He was required to give up all unauthorised profits to his principal, the Crown. Lord Porter said the following.

In these circumstances Denning J, held that the Crown was entitled to the money in question. It was, in his view, immaterial to consider whether the method of seizure was justified or not. Even if it was not, the Crown had a valid counterclaim and. avoiding a circuity of action, could thus defeat the Appellant's claim. " It is", he says, " a claim for restitution of moneys " which, in justice, ought to be paid over." It was suggested in argument that the learned judge founded his decision solely upon the doctrine of unjust enrichment and that that doctrine was not recognised by the law of England. My Lords, the exact status of the law of unjust enrichment is not yet assured. It holds a predominant place in the law of Scotland and, I think, of the United States, but I am content for the purposes of this case to accept the view that it forms no part of the law of England and that a right to restitution so described would be too widely stated. But. indeed, this doctrine is not of the essence of Denning, J.'s, judgment. His reasoning is to be found in the passage which succeeds that quoted. He says:

"In my judgment, it is a principle of law that if a servant takes advantage of his service by violating his duty of honesty and good faith, to make a prom for himself, in this sense, that the assets of which he has control, or the facilities which he enjoys, or the position which he occupies, are the real cause of his obtaining the money, as distinct from being the mere opportunity for getting it, that is to say, if they play the predominant part in his obtaining the money, then he is accountable for it to the master. It matters not that the master has not lost any profit, nor suffered any damage. Nor does it matter that the master could not have done the act himself. It is a case where the servant has unjustly enriched himself by virtue of his service without his master's sanction. It is money which the servant ought not to be allowed to keep, and the law says it shall be taken from him and given to his master, because he got it solely by reason of the position which he occupied as a servant of his master."

And again,

"The uniform of the Crown, and the position of the man as a servant of the Crown were the sole reasons why he was able to get this money, and that is sufficient to make him liable to hand it over to the Crown."

The learned judge however also says:

"There was not, in this case, a fiduciary relationship; and this man Reading was not acting in the course of his employment."

If this means, as I think it does, that the Appellant was neither a trustee nor in possession of some profit-earning chattel and that it was contrary to his duty to escort unwarranted traffic or possibly any traffic through the streets of Cairo, it is true, but, in my view, irrelevant. He nevertheless was using his position as a Sergeant in His Majesty's Army and the uniform to which his rank entitled him to obtain the money which he received. In my opinion any official position, whether marked by a uniform or not, which enables the holder to earn money by its use gives his master a right to receive the money so earned even though it was earned by a criminal act.

== See also ==
- English trusts law
- English land law
- English property law
