= Isaac Naylor & Sons Ltd v NZ Co-op Wool Marketing Assoc Ltd =

- Court: Court of Appeal of New Zealand
- Full case name: Isaac Naylor & Sons Ltd v NZ Co-op Wool Marketing Assn Ltd
- Decided: 14 August 1981
- Citation: [1981] 1 NZLR 361

Court membership
- Judges sitting: Cooke, Richardson and McMullin JJ

Isaac Naylor & Sons Ltd v NZ Co-op Wool Marketing Assoc Ltd [1981] 1 NZLR 361 is a cited case in New Zealand regarding remoteness of loss for damages. This case reinforces the English case of The Herron II; Koufos v C Czarnikow Ltd [1969] 1 AC 350 into NZ case law.
