= Transfield Shipping Inc v Mercator Shipping Inc =

English contract law case concerning remoteness of damage

The Achilleas
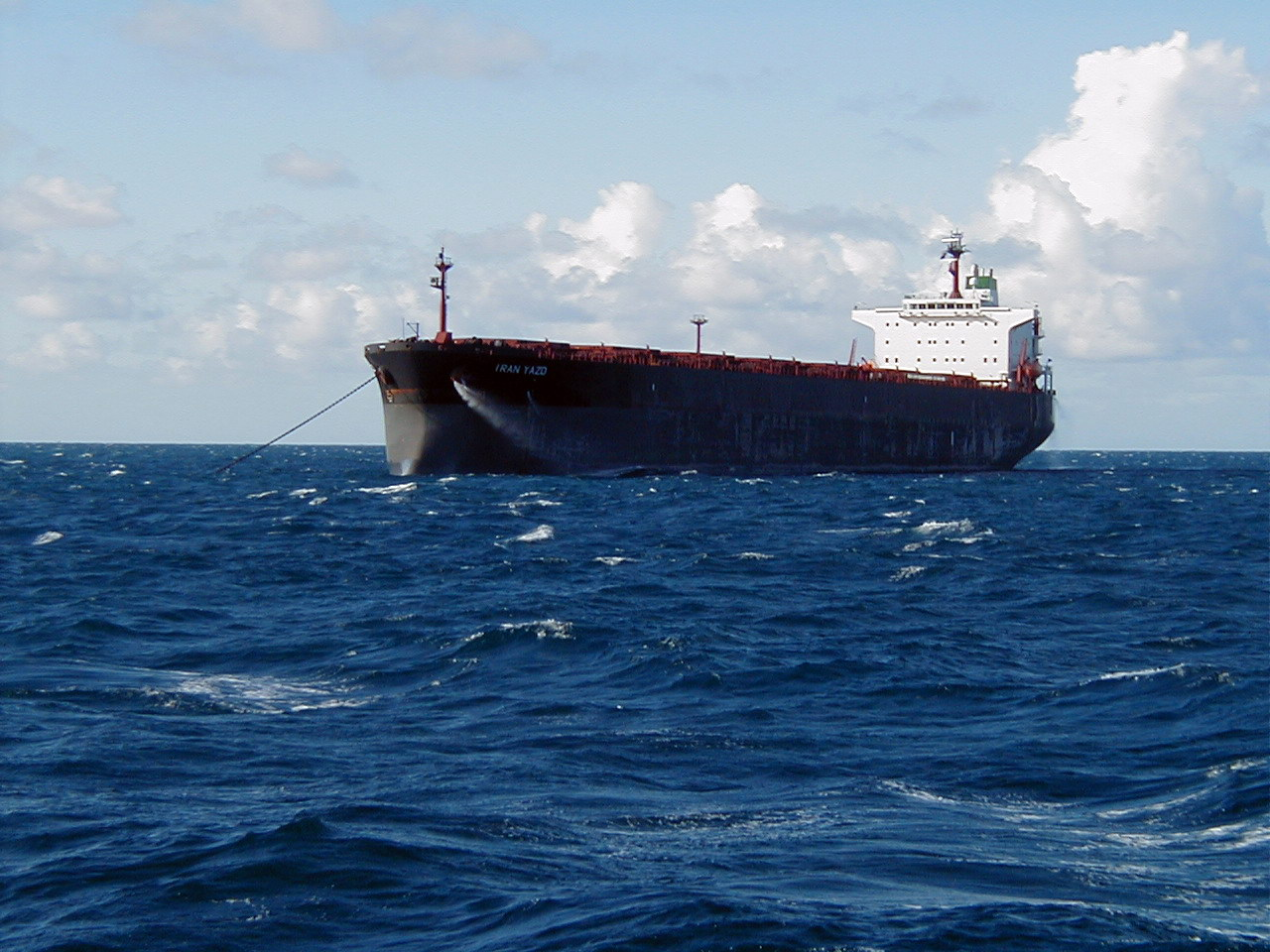
- Court: House of Lords
- Full case name: Transfield Shipping Inc v Mercator Shipping Inc
- Decided: 9 July 2008
- Citations: [2008] UKHL 48, [2008] 3 WLR 345, [2008] 4 All ER 159, [2008] 2 All ER (Comm) 753, [2008] 2 Lloyd's Rep 275
- Transcript: Full House of Lords judgment

Case history
- Prior action: [2006] EWHC 3030 (Comm) [2007] EWCA Civ 901

Court membership
- Judges sitting: Lord Hoffmann; Lord Hope of Craighead; Lord Rodger of Earlsferry; Lord Walker of Gestingthorpe; Baroness Hale of Richmond

The Achilleas or Transfield Shipping Inc v Mercator Shipping Inc [2008] UKHL 48 is an English contract law case, concerning remoteness of damage.

== Facts ==
Transfield Shipping was a charterer. It hired use of Mercator's ship, The Achilleas. Transfield was meant to have the ship for five to seven months, and return it no later than midnight on 2 May 2004. Mercator contracted to let the ship to another charterer (Cargill International SA) on 8 May 2004 at $39,500 a day for four to six months. But Transfield did not return the ship until 11 May. With two weeks to go they were appointed to carry coals from Qingdao, China across the Yellow Sea to Tobata and Oita, Japan. Since it was returned late, the new charterer, Cargill, agreed to take the ship, but only at $31,500 a day, since the freight market had fallen sharply.

The question was how much Transfield should pay to Mercator for returning the ship late. Transfield argued they should only pay an amount reflecting the difference between the first contract rate and the market rate for daily hire during the delay, at the market rate prevailing then. This would make $158,301.17. Mercator argued Transfield should pay the amount they had lost on the new chartering contract because of the late return, which adding up the cost over the months would be $1,364,584.37.

== Judgments ==
=== Arbitration ===
The arbitrators of the case, by a majority, decided in favour of Mercator. They held that the loss from getting a lower price on the next chartering contract was within the first rule in Hadley v Baxendale as arising "naturally, i.e. according to the usual course of things, from such breach of contract itself". It fell within that rule because it was damage "of a kind which the [charterer], when he made the contract, ought to have realised was not unlikely to result from a breach of contract [by delay in redelivery]".

The dissenting arbitrator, however, concluded that a reasonable person in Transfield's position would not have understood he was assuming liability for the risk of the type of loss that occurred. The shipping market's general understanding was that liability was restricted to the difference between the market rate and the charter rate for the period of lateness and

"any departure from this rule [is] likely to give rise to a real risk of serious commercial uncertainty which the industry as a whole would regard as undesirable".

=== Court of Appeal ===
The Court of Appeal upheld the arbitrators' ruling. In concluding his opinion, Rix LJ stated that the argument that:

"damages for late redelivery should be limited to the overrun period measure unless the owners can show that, at the time of the contract, they had given their charterers special information of their follow-up fixture, is both undesirable and uncommercial."

According to Rix,

"It is undesirable because it puts owners too much at the mercy of their charterers, who can happily drain the last drop and more of profit at a time of raised market rates, taking the risk of late redelivery, knowing that they will never have to pay their owners more than the current market rate for the overrun period, a rate which will never in truth properly reflect the value to the charterers of being able to fit in another spot voyage at the last moment. It is uncommercial because, if it is demanded that the charterers need to know more than they already do in the ordinary course of events, when they already know that a new fixture, in all probability fixed at or around the time of redelivery, will follow on their own charter, then the demand is for something that cannot be provided. All that an owner will be able to tell his charterer in most cases is that he plans to fix his vessel anew at the time of redelivery. To which the charterer might reply: 'well I know that already! But don’t expect that your telling me that is enough to put me on notice for the purpose of claiming loss of fixture damages, if I deliver the vessel late and you turn out to lose your fixture!' Such an answer, however, reflects the uncommerciality and error of the charterers’ submission."

=== House of Lords ===
The House of Lords reversed Court of Appeal's decision, holding unanimously that the loss of profits in the next charter was not within the rule in Hadley v Baxendale. However, their Lordships were divided on the interpretation of the rule.

Lord Hoffmann (with whom Lord Hope gave a concurring judgment) noted that it had always been assumed that damages for late delivery were the difference between market and charter rate. As to the core issue in this case, he said this.

"The case therefore raises a fundamental point of principle in the law of contractual damages: is the rule that a party may recover losses which were foreseeable ("not unlikely") an external rule of law, imposed upon the parties to every contract in default of express provision to the contrary, or is it a prima facie assumption about what the parties may be taken to have intended, no doubt applicable in the great majority of cases but capable of rebuttal in cases in which the context, surrounding circumstances or general understanding in the relevant market shows that a party would not reasonably have been regarded as assuming responsibility for such losses?"

He stated that the majority of arbitrators had applied too crude a test of what the type of foreseeable loss was. The industry's common understanding was crucial to Hadley v Baxendale. The question was not simply, what was a probable loss, but what the parties had in mind, or what was in their contemplation, regarding the nature of the business transaction. He noted Goff J's statement in Satef-Huttenes Albertus SpA v Paloma Tercera Shipping Co SA (The Pegase) [1981] Lloyd’s Rep 175, 183, asking what a reasonable person would have thought his responsibility was.

“The test appears to be: have the facts in question come to the defendant’s knowledge in such circumstances that a reasonable person in the shoes of the defendant would, if he had considered the matter at the time of making the contract, have contemplated that, in the event of a breach by him, such facts were to be taken into account when considering his responsibility for loss suffered by the plaintiff as a result of such breach.”

Lord Hoffmann said one should look at "the background of market expectations". Liability for the next contract would be "completely unquantifiable". And according to Lord Reid in C Czarnikow Ltd v Koufos, the question was if short delay, resulting in extraordinary loss was

"sufficiently likely to result from the breach of contract to make it proper to hold that the loss flowed naturally from the breach or that loss of that kind should have been within [Transfield's] contemplation".

In this case it was not. It was contrary to the principle in Victoria Laundry (Windsor) v Newman Industries to think that Transfield was going to be liable for any loss, however enormous, when it had no knowledge or control over what contract Mercator might be making next. To work out what is "in the parties' contemplation" and what is not, Lord Hoffmann said,

"the only rational basis for the distinction is that it reflects what would have been reasonable and have been regarded by the contracting party as significant for the purposes of the risk he was undertaking."

On the nature of the "contemplation" rule, Lord Hoffmann said the following,

"I agree that cases of departure from the ordinary foreseeability rule based on individual circumstances will be unusual, but limitations on the extent of liability in particular types of contract arising out of general expectations in certain markets, such as banking and shipping, are likely to be more common. There is, I think, an analogy with the distinction which Lord Cross of Chelsea drew in Liverpool City Council v Irwin [1977] AC 239, 257-258 between terms implied into all contracts of a certain type and the implication of a term into a particular contract... It seems to me logical to found liability for damages upon the intention of the parties (objectively ascertained) because all contractual liability is voluntarily undertaken. It must be in principle wrong to hold someone liable for risks for which the people entering into such a contract in their particular market, would not reasonably be considered to have undertaken."

Lord Hope agreed. He noted Blackburn J said in Cory v Thames Ironworks Co saying if the damage were exceptional and unnatural it would be harsh to make a party liable for it, because had he known he would have pushed for more time in the first place.

Lord Rodger and Lady Hale on the other hand, decided the case on the more narrow ground, that the rule in Hadley was simply a question of what is foreseeable or ‘likely’. Lord Rodger said at [53],

"it is important not to lose sight of the basic point that, in the absence of special knowledge, a party entering into a contract can only be supposed to contemplate the losses which are likely to result from the breach in question - in other words, those losses which will generally happen in the ordinary course of things if the breach occurs. Those are the losses for which the party in breach is held responsible - the stated rationale being that, other losses not having been in contemplation, the parties had no opportunity to provide for them."

== Interpretation ==
The Commercial Court in 2010, in the case of Sylvia Shipping Co Ltd v Progress Bulk Carriers Ltd., reviewed the Transfield decision, because Transfield's conclusion - that a defaulting party would not be liable for reasonably foreseeable costs if the parties did not intend the party in breach to have assumed liability for those costs when the contract was formed - had led to some confusion. Hamblen J commented that there were two distinct approaches in use: an "orthodox" approach which followed the principles laid down in Hadley v Baxendale, and a "broader" approach which "added another layer onto the traditional rules on remoteness". The court in Sylvia Shipping came to the conclusion that the orthodox or traditional approach to remoteness, following Hadley, would apply in most cases, but in exceptional situations the "broader" approach based on whether there was also "an assumption of responsibility" should also be applied.

== See also ==
- Remoteness in English law
- Hadley v Baxendale (1854) 9 Exch 341; 156 ER 145 Ex Ct
- Victoria Laundry (Windsor) v Newman Industries [1949] 2 KB 528
- Koufos v C Czarnikow Ltd or The Heron II [1969] 1 AC 350
- Parsons (Livestock) Ltd v Uttley Ingham & Co Ltd [1978] 1 QB 791
- South Australia Asset Management Co v York Montague [1996] 3 All ER 365
- Attorney General of Belize v Belize Telecom Ltd [2009] UKPC 11
