= Julius Caesar Czarnikow =

- Born: 1838; Sondershausen, Germany
- Died: 17 April 1909 (aged 70–71); London, England
- Occupation: Sugar broker
- Parent(s): Moritz Czarnikow; Johanne Bar

Julius Caesar Czarnikow (1838 – 17 April 1909) was a German-born, London-based sugar broker and investor.

== Early life ==
Julius Caesar Czarnikow was born in 1838 in Sondershausen, in the German Confederation. He was of Polish Jewish descent. His father was Moritz Czarnikow and his mother, Johanne Bar. He was baptized 1862 in Berlin, and married in 1863 at Holy Trinity, Clapham.

Czarnikow moved to England in 1854, and he became a British subject in 1861. He resided in Effingham Hill House and Eaton Square (1901 census), London. He married Louisa Ellen Ashlin (1840-1911), with whom he had 2 children : Horace (1864 -1933), and Louisa Ada (1867-1948).

== Career ==
Czarnikow founded a sugar brokerage firm, Czarnikow & Co., in 1861, which now trades as Czarnikow Group Ltd. Its first office was at 18 Philpot Lane, London, and the company later had offices in Liverpool, Glasgow and New York City. He partnered with Manuel Rionda of Cuba, who admitted to Czarnikow in 1909 that he struggled to find the right chemist for sugar manufacturing.

Czarnikow was an investor in a sugar shipping company from the West Indies to Central Europe. By 1872, he was also the largest investor in the South Carolina Phosphate Company. Additionally, by 1888 he was an investor in the London Produce Clearing House, and he served as its deputy chairman.

== Death ==
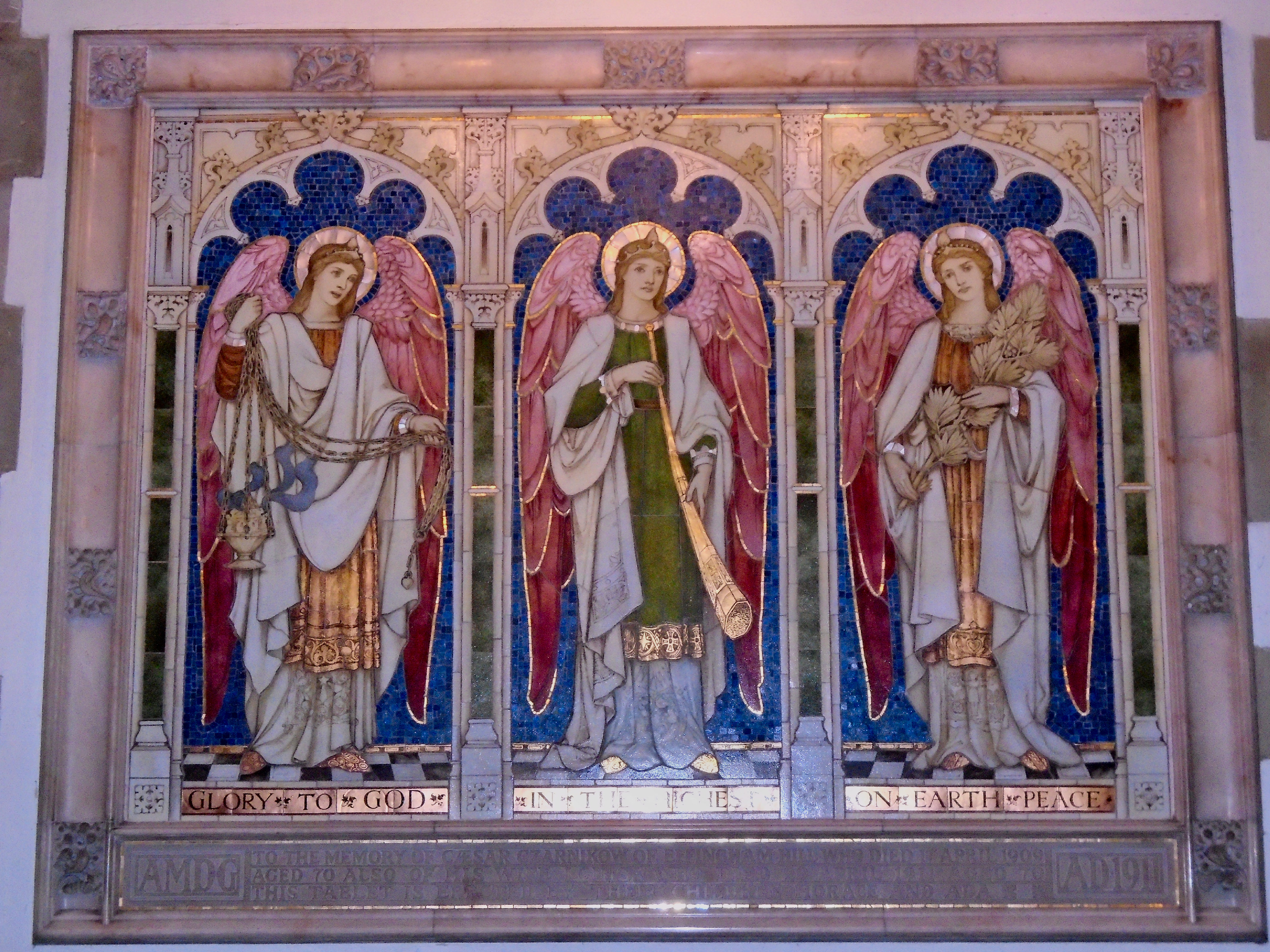
Memorial Mosaic, St Lawrence's Church, Effingham

Czarnikow died on 17 April 1909 in London. By the time of his death, "he was said to be the biggest sugar broker in the world", with an estimated wealth of £1 million.

At Probate in 1909 his executors included Julius Charles Ganzoni (born 1852 in Austria, died 1949 in Cambridgeshire); the 1911 census stated he was a partner in a firm of colonial brokers, and his son Francis J Childs Ganzoni (born 1882) was a barrister.
