= Manuel Rionda =

Spanish-born, US-based sugar baron in Cuba

Manuel Rionda y Polledo
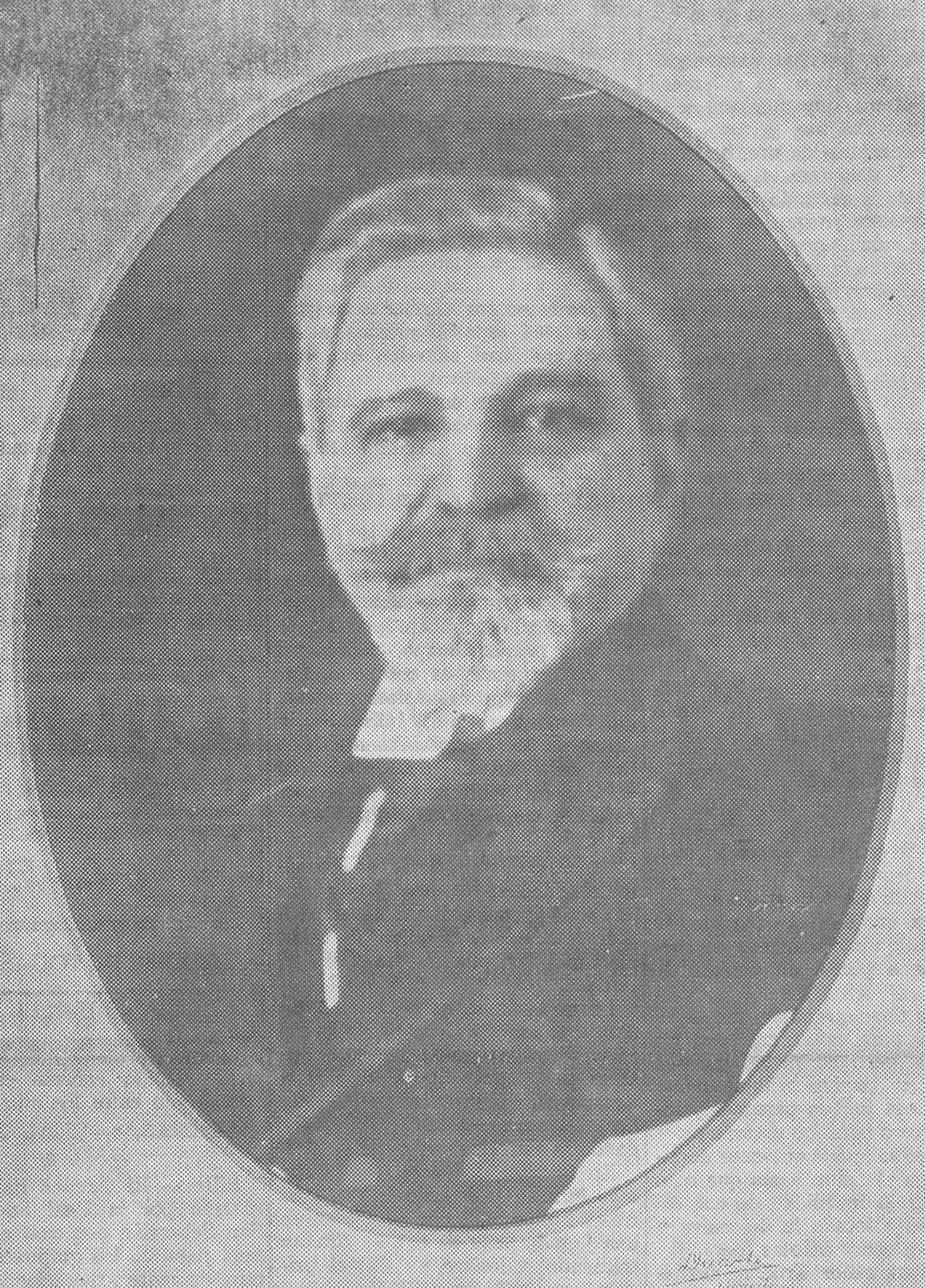
- Born: 1854; Noreña, Spain
- Died: 1943 (aged 88–89); Alpine, New Jersey, U.S.
- Occupation: Businessman
- Spouse: Harriet Clarke

Manuel Rionda (1854–1943) was a Spanish-born, US-based sugar baron in Cuba.

== Early life ==
Manuel Rionda was born in 1854 in Noreña, Spain. The Rionda family began investing in Cuban sugar in the 1860s. By 1870, when Rionda was sixteen, Rionda emigrated to Cuba.

== Career ==
Rionda co-founded the Czarnikow-Rionda Company with Julius Caesar Czarnikow in 1909. By 1915, he co-founded the Cuba Cane Sugar Company with his family.

Rionda was the owner of sugar plantations in Cuba. Prior to the 1930s, Czarnikow-Rionda Company "sold 40 per cent of Cuba's sugar".

== Personal life ==
Rionda married Harriet Clarke, and they resided at Rio Vista estate, a 300-acre estate in Alpine, New Jersey. They had no children, but they raised his orphaned nephew, Manuel Enrique Rionda, who later resided on the Glen Goin estate in Alpine with his wife, Ellen Goin.

== Death and legacy ==
Rionda died in 1943. A tower designed by architect Charles Rollinson Lamb on his former estate still stands in Alpine, New Jersey, one of the most affluent zipcodes in the United States. 40.933872°N 73.933230°W
