= Consequential damages =

Legal concept

Consequential damages, otherwise known as special damages, are damages that can be proven to have occurred because of the failure of one party to meet a contractual obligation, a breach of contract. From a legal standpoint, an enforceable contract is present when it is: expressed by a valid offer and acceptance, has adequate consideration, mutual assent, capacity, and legality. Consequential damages go beyond the contract itself and into the actions that arise from the failure to fulfill. The type of claim giving rise to the damages, such as whether it is a breach of contract action or tort claim, can affect the rules or calculations associated with a given type of damages. For example, consequential damages are a potential type of expectation damages that arise in contract law.

When a contract is breached, the recognized remedy for an owner is recovery of damages that result directly from the breach (also known as "compensatory damages"). Damages may include the cost to repair or complete the work in accordance with the contract documents, or the value of lost or damaged work. In addition to the compensatory damage, an owner can also seek for consequential damages (sometimes referred to as "indirect" or "special" damages), which include loss of product and loss of profit or revenue. This may be recovered if it is determined such damages were reasonably foreseeable or "within the contemplation of the parties" at the time of contract formation. This is a factual determination that could lead to the contractor's liability for an enormous loss. For example, the cost to complete unfinished work on time may pale in comparison to the loss of operating revenue an owner might claim as a result of late completion. In order to seek consequential damages, a party who has suffered physical injury, property damage, or financial loss needs to perform a duty to mitigate damages, which means that they have an obligation to reduce or minimize the effect and any losses resulting from the injury.

The degree of proof required for the consequential damages is also higher than for the direct damages. Consequential damages must also be pled with greater specificity. The plaintiff has it on their burden to prove that the damages occurred are not only the proximate consequence of the breach, but also that they were "reasonably foreseeable" or within the "contemplation of the parties" when the parties agreed to the terms of the contract. The logic for proving foreseeability is that a party who can foresee a consequences of a breach of a contract can modify the contract price accordingly to compensate for the risk that is assumed. Further, in order to recover damages caused by a breach, the non-breaching party must act reasonably and timely to mitigate its damages.

The Supreme Court of the United States has held in United States v. 50 Acres of Land that consequential damages are not available in U.S. Federal takings.

== Examples ==
The provenance of the legal theory underlying "consequential damages" is widely attributed to the 19th century English case of Hadley v. Baxendale, in which a miller contracted for the purchase of a crankshaft for a steam engine at the mill. The party agreeing to produce the part (which was critical to the mill's operation and/or output) agreed to deliver the part for inspection as to fit by a certain date in order to avoid contractual and other business loss/liability. When the part was not delivered for inspection on time, the miller sued to recover not only the direct costs that were incident to the alleged breach, but also to recover the costs/losses that were entailed with the production shutdown resulting from the failure to timely deliver the crankshaft. Thus, Baxendale came to stand for the proposition that "consequential damages" are recoverable where a contract is breached by a party that knows – or is imputed to know – that ordinary expectancy, reliance, or restitution damages will not suffice to meet damages caused by the breach.

== See also ==
- Muirhead v Industrial Tank Specialist Ltd
