= Fons et origo =

Latin term meaning "source and origin"

Fons et origo is a Latin term meaning "source and origin". Typical usage of the term describes Athens as the fons et origo of democracy, or Italy as the fons et origo of classical music. Lancelot Ware (1915–2000), the founder of Mensa, was awarded the honorary title Fons et Origo by the society in 1987.
