= Cyril Asquith, Baron Asquith of Bishopstone =

English barrister, judge (1890–1954)

The Right Honourable The Lord Asquith of Bishopstone PC
- Asquith in 1937

Lord of Appeal in Ordinary
- In office 23 April 1951 – 24 August 1954
- Preceded by: The Lord MacDermott
- Succeeded by: The Lord Somervell of Harrow

Lord Justice of Appeal
- In office 13 February 1946 – 23 April 1951
- Preceded by: None
- Succeeded by: Sir John Morris

Justice of the High Court
- In office 28 March 1938 – 13 February 1946
- Preceded by: Sir Samuel Porter
- Succeeded by: Sir Frederic Sellers

Personal details
- Born: 25 February 1890 London, England
- Died: 24 August 1954 (aged 64) London, England
- Spouse: Anne Stephanie Pollock (m. 1918)
- Children: 4
- Parent(s): H. H. Asquith; Helen Kelsall Melland
- Education: Balliol College, Oxford

Cyril Asquith, Baron Asquith of Bishopstone, PC (5 February 1890 – 24 August 1954) was an English barrister and judge who served as a Lord of Appeal in Ordinary from 1951 until his death three years later.

The youngest child of British prime minister H. H. Asquith by his first wife, Cyril Asquith followed the steps of his father and eldest brother into a distinguished academic career at Balliol College, Oxford, before serving in the British Army during the First World War. After the war he practised, with modest success, at the common law bar until 1938, when he was appointed to the High Court. He was promoted to the Court of Appeal in 1946 and to the House of Lords in 1951. The same year he was offered the Lord Chancellorship by Winston Churchill, but declined the post.

Asquith was widely regarded as possessing one of the finest minds on the bench, although his rapid rise, after an unremarkable career at the bar, was the cause for some adverse comment. According to the Oxford Dictionary of National Biography, his career was an "undistinguished—although extraordinarily lucky" one.

== Early life and career ==
Born in Hampstead, London, Cyril Asquith was the fourth son and youngest child of the barrister H. H. Asquith, later Prime Minister and subsequently Earl of Oxford and Asquith, from his first marriage to Helen Kelsall Melland. His mother died in 1891, a year after his birth.

Known to his friends as Cys, Asquith was educated at Summer Fields School, Winchester College, where he was a scholar, and Balliol College, Oxford, where he was a foundation scholar. Following in the steps of his father and his brother Raymond, Cyril Asquith obtained first-class honours in Classical Moderations in 1911 and in literae humaniores in 1913. At Oxford he won the Hertford, Craven, Ireland, and Eldon scholarships. In 1913, while still an undergraduate, he was elected a fellow of Magdalen College, Oxford. Naturally reserved, he did not follow his brothers Raymond and Herbert, both former presidents of the Oxford Union, in becoming involved with the Union.

At the outbreak of the First World War in 1914, he was commissioned into the 1/16th (County of London) Battalion, The London Regiment (Queen's Westminster Rifles) as a second lieutenant, eventually reaching the rank of captain. From 1916 to 1918 Asquith, who was deemed medically unfit for military service abroad, was employed by the Ministry of Munitions, serving for a time on the British War Mission in the United States.

After the war, Asquith was called to the bar at the Inner Temple in 1920, and was a pupil in the chambers of William Jowitt who, as Lord Chancellor, recommended Asquith's promotions to the Court of Appeal and the House of Lords. Asquith's practice, in the common law courts, was not especially large. Between 1925 and 1938 he was Assistant Reader in Common Law to the Council of Legal Education. He took silk in 1936, was appointed Recorder of Salisbury in 1937, and was elected bencher of the Inner Temple in 1939. He was elected to the Liberal Party Council in 1936.

== Judicial career ==
Asquith was appointed a Justice of the High Court on 28 March 1938 to fill the vacancy left by the appointment of Mr Justice Porter to the House of Lords. He was assigned to the King's Bench Division and received the customary knighthood three days later. His appointment caused some surprise at the bar and bench. In particular, the Lord Chief Justice, Lord Hewart, felt that he had not been properly consulted about the appointment. Hewart assigned Asquith a number of high-profile criminal trials at the Old Bailey, where mistakes would adversely affect his reputation. However, as a judge, Asquith was especially successful in the trial of criminal cases, where his ability to explain the law to the jury was valuable, though he was occasionally criticised as being too lenient in his sentences.

During the Second World War, Asquith provided advice to King George VI on his power to refuse a dissolution in 1939. In 1941, he presided over the trial in camera of two German spies at the Old Bailey and sentenced them to death under the Treachery Act. He also chaired a number of tribunals and commissions: he was the High Court judge attached to the General Claims Tribunal in 1939, chairman of the Advisory Committee on the internment of enemy aliens in 1940, chairman of the Commission on Higher Education in Colonies in 1943–44, and chairman of the Royal Commission on Equal Pay in 1944–46.

After the war, following the death of Lord Justice MacKinnon in 1946, Asquith was appointed a Lord Justice of Appeal and was sworn of the Privy Council, on the recommendation of Lord Jowitt. On 23 April 1951, again on Jowitt's recommendation, Asquith was appointed a Lord of Appeal in Ordinary and created a life peer as Baron Asquith of Bishopstone, of Bishopstone in the County of Sussex. In 1952 he was appointed to the Law Reform Committee and as chairman of the Political Honours Scrutiny Committee.

In October 1951, Asquith was offered the Lord Chancellorship by Winston Churchill. Lacking in political experience and in poor health, the offer came as a surprise to him. Although his family pleaded with him to accept the post, he declined it; to his son-in-law John Stephenson he wrote that Churchill "mustn't be saddled with a lame duck on the Woolsack". In selecting Asquith Churchill might have been influenced by the fact that Asquith's father had appointed him to his first Cabinet post, or by their shared membership of The Other Club, where they met frequently. (Brendan Bracken told Harold Macmillan that Churchill had "set his heart on getting Cys Asquith as Lord Chancellor, chiefly because he wished his last administration to hold both an Asquith and a Lloyd George.") Eventually, the post was given to Lord Simonds, a law lord whom Churchill had never met.

Asquith remained on the bench until his sudden death at his London home on 24 August 1954. His funeral was held at Bishopstone Church, Sussex on 28 August. A memorial service, attended by Churchill, was held at Temple Church on 5 October.

Asquith was the author of Trade Union Law for Laymen (1927), a Latin translation of poems from A Shropshire Lad (1929), and Life of Herbert Henry Asquith (1932), his father's authorised biography, which he co-authored with J. A. Spender. He also contributed many unsigned leaders and letters to The Times.

== Assessment ==
Asquith's intellect was highly regarded by his contemporaries. However, assessments of his performance as a judge were more mixed, though it was said that "the higher he went the better he became". Lord Chancellor Simon reportedly thought that Asquith "possessed the most distinguished mind of any judge on the Bench". In 1946, recommending Asquith's promotion to the Court of Appeal, Simon's successor Lord Jowitt wrote to Clement Attlee that:

If he were to be appointed a member of the Court of Appeal, he would be one of a team, and under the tutelage of the Master of the Rolls he might be made to do some work … I recognise that his promotion would be regarded by the Bench and Bar as a reward for singularly unmeritorious services. On the other hand, I still believe he has the best brain of any of the King's Bench judges … I should be thankful to get rid of him from the King's Bench Division, as would many, many of the senior judges.

Asquith was a conservative judge. Famously, in Candler v. Crane, Christmas & Co. (1951), in response to Lord Denning's critique in his dissent that "there were the timorous souls who were fearful of allowing a new cause of action", Asquith replied that "If this relegates me to the company of timorous souls, I must face that consequence with such fortitude as I can command".

As to his impact, Robert Stevens thought that "perhaps because of his nature and his natural conservatism, he had virtually no impact in the Lords … It was an undistinguished period in the House of Lords as a final court of appeal; Asquith did nothing to ameliorate it." However, his judgments, which combined his knowledge of the law and his literary interests, were said by Stevens to possess a certain distinction.

== Family ==
At St Margaret's, Westminster on 12 February 1918, Asquith married Anne Stephanie Pollock (27 April 1896 – 1964), daughter of Sir Adrian Donald Wilde Pollock, solicitor Chamberlain of the City of London. Through her father she was the great-granddaughter of the judge Sir Frederick Pollock, 1st Baronet. They had two sons and two daughters. His younger daughter, the Hon (Frances) Rose Asquith (1925–2020), married in 1951 John Stephenson, later a Lord Justice of Appeal.

== Arms ==
Coat of arms of Cyril Asquith, Baron Asquith of Bishopstone
Crest Issuant out of Clouds proper a Mascle Gules Escutcheon Sable on a Fess between three Crosses Crosslet Argent a Portcullis of the field Motto Sine Macula Macla (Spotless)

== Selected judgments ==
- Victoria Laundry (Windsor) Ltd v Newman Industries Ltd [1949] 2 KB 528 — remoteness
- Candler v Crane, Christmas & Co [1951] 2 KB 164 — negligent misstatement
- Petroleum Development (Trucial Coast) Ltd. v. Sheikh of Abu Dhabi (1951) 18 ILR 144 — the Abu Dhabi Arbitration
- National Coal Board v England [1954] AC 403 — illegality
