= Remoteness in English law =

Legal concept regarding causes of action and damages incurred

In English law, remoteness between a cause of action and the loss or damage sustained as a result is addressed through a set of rules in both tort and contract, which limit the amount of compensatory damages available for a wrong.

In negligence, the test of causation not only requires that the defendant was the cause in fact, but also requires that the loss or damage sustained by the claimant was not too remote. As with the policy issues in establishing that there was a duty of care and that that duty was breached, remoteness is designed as a further limit on a cause of action to ensure that the liability to pay damages placed on the defendant is done fairly.

== Tort ==
=== Directness ===
The traditional approach was that once a breach in the duty of care had been established, a defendant was liable for all the consequent damage no matter how unusual or unpredictable that damage might be. In Re Polemis while docked, workers employed to unload the ship negligently dropped a plank into the hold, which struck something, causing a spark that ignited petrol vapour lying in the hold. The fire destroyed the whole ship. The Lords held that although the fire was not a reasonably foreseeable consequence of the plank falling, there had been a breach of the duty of care and all damage representing a direct consequence of the negligent act was recoverable. It was determined that once some harm was foreseeable, the defendant would be liable for the full extent of the harm. That particular consequences are possible does not make them reasonably foreseeable. This will particularly be the case when there are a significant number of links constituting the chain. The more links, the less likely that consequence may be considered reasonably foreseeable.

- Greenland v Chaplin (1850) 5 Ex 243, Pollock CB advocated a foreseeability test for remoteness
- Smith v The London and South Western Railway Company (1870–71) LR 6 CP 14, seven members of Exchequer Court uphold directness rule
- Re Polemis & Furniss, Withy & Co Ltd [1921] 3 KB 560
- Glasgow Corp v Muir [1943] AC 448

=== Foreseeability ===
However, in The Wagon Mound (No 1), a large quantity of oil was spilt into Sydney Harbour from the Wagon Mound and it drifted under the wharf where the claimants were oxyacetylene welding. The resulting fire caused extensive damage to the wharf and to vessels moored nearby. The Privy Council replaced the direct consequence test with the requirement that, in order to be recoverable, damage must be foreseeable in all the circumstances, thus, although pollution was a foreseeable consequence of the spillage, an outbreak of fire was not. Viscount Simonds held at pp 422–423:

A man must be considered to be responsible for the probable consequences of his act. To demand more of him is too harsh a rule, to demand less is to ignore that civilised order requires the observance of a minimum standard of behaviour.

He went on to say at p 423, that a man should be responsible for the necessary or probable consequences of his act (or any other similar description of them), "not because they are natural or necessary or probable, but because, since they have this quality, it is judged by the standard of the reasonable man that he ought to have foreseen them."

In Hughes v Lord Advocate a child climbed down a manhole left uncovered and protected only by a tent and paraffin lamp. When he came out he kicked over one of the lamps, which fell into the hole and caused an explosion. The child was burned. Lord Reid said at 845,

So we have (first) a duty owned by the workmen, (secondly) the fact that if they had done as they ought to have done there would have been no accident, and (thirdly) the fact that the injuries suffered by the appellant, though perhaps different in degree, did not differ in kind from injuries that might have resulted from an accident of a foreseeable nature. The ground on which this case has been decided against the appellant is that the accident was of an unforeseeable type. Of course, the pursuer has to prove that the defender's fault caused the accident and there could be a case where the intrusion of a new and unexpected factor could be regarded as the cause of the accident rather than the fault of the defender. But that is not this case. The cause of this accident was a known source of danger, the lamp, but it behaved in an unpredictable way...

The Wagon Mound (No 1) test is less generous to claimants than the direct consequence test because it may impose an artificial limit on the extent of damages that can be claimed. To mitigate some of the potential unfairness of the rule, the courts have been inclined to take a relatively liberal view of whether damage is of a foreseeable type. In Lamb v. London Borough of Camden a water main maintained by the Council broke, which caused extensive damage to the claimant's house. Because of the damage, the claimant moved out and squatters moved in, causing further damage to the house. The court held that the secondary damage caused by the squatters was too remote. The council was liable for the damage caused by the broken water main, but the land owner is responsible for keeping trespassers at bay. Lord Denning said at p636 that remoteness of damages is just a question of policy with the element of foreseeability being determined by what is perceived to be instinctively just. This means that the reasonable foreseeability test is not always appropriate for cases where the acts of the claimant may demonstrate some fault. Nevertheless, the courts can award damages based on foreseeability where public policy requires it, e.g. in the egg-shell skull cases such as Smith v Leech Brain & Co.

Although some courts have on occasion adopted a more restrictive approach, the decision of the Lords in Jolley v Sutton London Borough Council, suggests that the liberal approach is to be preferred. The council allowed an abandoned boat to remain on its land and, over a period of time, two boys began to paint and repair it. Unfortunately, the boat fell on one of the boys, seriously injuring him. The claimant's case was that the boat represented a trap or allurement. The council accepted that it had been negligent in not removing the boat but that it had not been foreseeable that two boys would try to jack up the boat and so move it from the cradle upon which it lay. Lords Steyn and Hoffman stated that it is not necessary to foresee the precise injury that occurred, but injury of a given description. "The foreseeability is not as to the particulars but the genus. And the description is formulated by reference to the nature of the risk that ought to have been foreseen." (at para 37) So, in Hughes it was foreseeable that a child might be injured by falling in the hole or being burned by a lamp or by a combination of both. Although the injuries were not actually sustained in a foreseeable way, the injuries that actually materialised fell within the predictable range. Thus, the Wagon Mound No.2 and Hughes are compatible. The former alleged that damage by burning was not damage of a description that could reasonably have been foreseen, while the latter asserted that the injury was not reasonably foreseeable. In both cases, the claimants could recover damages.

- Tremain v Pike [1969] 1 WLR 1556
- Smith v Leech Brain & Co [1961] 2 QB 405
- Bourhill v Young [1943] AC 92, 108

=== Novus actus interveniens ===
"Novus actus interveniens", literally meaning "a new intervening act", also referred to as "breaking the chain" refers to the idea that a causal connections is deemed to have finished because some other act has interrupted the chain. Cases which have referred to this principle include:

- Scott v Shepherd (1772) 95 ER 525
- King v Sussex Ambulance NHS Trust [2002] EWCA Civ 953
- McKew v Holland & Hannan Ltd [1969] 3 All ER 1621

== Contract ==
The following is a list of legal cases in which remoteness has been an issue:

- Hadley v Baxendale (1854) 9 Exch 341
- Fletcher v Tayleur (1855) 17 CB 21, a defendant who agrees to supply or repair a chattel obviously being used for profit making is liable for loss of ordinary profits as a result of failing to be on time.
- British Columbia and Vancouver Island Spa, Lumber and Saw Mill Co Ltd v Nettleship (1868) LR 3 CP 499
- Horne v Midland Railway Co (1873) LR 6 CP 131, stands for the proposition that the defendant assumed liability for the exceptional loss.
- Simpson v London and North Western Railway Co (1876) 1 QBD 274, the defendant must at least know of the special circumstances; also Seven Seas Properties Ltd v Al-Essa (No.2) [1993] 1 WLR 1083
- Hydraulic Engineering Co Ltd v McHaffie, Goslett & Co (1878) 4 QBD 670, McHaffie contracted to make a gun, known to form a part of a gunpowder pile driver, to be built for Justice. It was delivered late, and Justice refused to take it. Bramwell LJ held that Hydraulic could recover the expenditure in making other parts of the machine, ‘useless except as old iron’ because it was built specially, the cost of painting it to preserve and a reasonable net profit that they would have made on the contract with Justice. Brett LJ and Cotton LJ concurred.
- Balfour Beatty v Scottish Power plc (1994) SLT 807, one supplying a commodity for complicated construction projects will not be assumed to be aware of all little details.
- Victoria Laundry (Windsor) Ltd v Newman Industries Ltd [1948] 2 KB 528
- Koufos v Czarnikow Ltd or The Heron II [1969] 1 AC 350
- H Parsons (Livestock) Ltd v Uttley Ingham & Co Ltd [1978] 1 QB 791
- The Pegase or Satef-Huttenes Albertus SpA v Paloma Tercera Shipping Co SA [1981] 1 Lloyd’s LR 175
- Commonwealth of Australia v Amann Aviation Pty Ltd (1991) 174 CLR 64; noted by Treitel, 108 LQR 226
- South Australia Asset Management Co v York Montague [1996] 3 All ER 365
- Jackson v Royal Bank of Scotland [2005] UKHL 3, Lord Walker says [46-9] the two limbs of Hadley are not ‘mutually exclusive’.
- Transfield Shipping Inc v Mercator Shipping Inc (The Achilleas) [2008] UKHL 48

=== Contract and tort ===
- Henderson v Merrett Syndicates Ltd [1995] 2 AC 145, Lord Goff, 185, ‘the rules as to remoteness of damage… are less restricted in tort than they are in contract’.
- Brown v KMR Services Ltd [1995] 4 All ER 598, the kind of loss must be foreseeable, not the extent of loss; Stuart Smith LJ, 620–1 and Hobhouse LJ, 640–3 distinguish Victoria Laundry, and criticise saying that the distinction between super profits and normal ones is just one of degree.

== International comparisons ==
=== America ===
- Palsgraf v Long Island Railroad Co, 62 NE 99 (1928), relying on Thomas v Quartermaine (1887) LR 18 QBD 685
- William Prosser, ‘Palsgraf Revisited’ (1952) 52 Michigan Law Review 1

=== Germany ===
- "Adäquanztheorie": see de:Adäquanz.

== See also ==
- Damages
- Proximate cause
