= South Australia Asset Management Corp v York Montague Ltd =

English contract law case

SAAMCo v York Montague Ltd
- Court: House of Lords
- Full case name: South Australia Asset Management Corporation Respondents v. York Montague Ltd. Appellants United Bank of Kuwait Plc. Respondents v. Prudential Property Services Ltd. Appellants: Nykredit Mortgage Bank Plc. Respondents v. Edward Erdman Group Ltd. (formerly Edward Erdman (An Unlimited Company)) Appellants
- Citations: [1996] UKHL 10, [1997] AC 191

Court membership
- Judges sitting: Lord Goff of Chieveley, Lord Jauncey of Tullichettle, Lord Slynn of Hadley, Lord Nicholls of Birkenhead, Lord Hoffmann

Case opinions
- Lord Hoffmann

Keywords
- Negligent misstatement, market values, remoteness of loss

South Australia Asset Management Corporation v York Montague Ltd and Banque Bruxelles Lambert SA v Eagle Star Insurance Co Ltd [1996] UKHL 10 is a joined English contract law case, often referred to as "SAAMCO", concerned with on causation and remoteness of damage. It arose out of the property crash in the early 1990s, whereby banks were suing valuers for overpricing houses in order to recover the lost market value. Owners themselves often had little or no money, since they had fallen victim to negative equity, so mortgage lenders would pursue a valuer instead to recover some losses. The legal principle arising from the case is often referred to as the "SAAMCO principle".

== Facts ==
In the South Australia case, a valuer had (in breach of an implied term to exercise reasonable care and skill) negligently advised his client bank that property which it proposed to take as security for a loan was worth much more than its actual market value. The question was whether he should be liable not only for losses attributable to the deficient security but also for further losses attributable to a fall in the property market. The House of Lords decided that he should not be liable for this kind of loss.

== Judgment ==
The judges held that the valuer was not liable for the losses resulting from market fluctuations. Lord Hoffmann gave his judgment as follows:

15. How is the scope of the duty determined? In the case of a statutory duty, the question is answered by deducing the purpose of the duty from the language and context of the statute: Gorris v Scott (1874) L.R. 9 Ex. 125. In the case of tort, it will similarly depend upon the purpose of the rule imposing the duty. Most of the judgments in the Caparo case (Note: Caparo Industries plc v Dickman [1990] 2 AC 605) are occupied in examining the Companies Act 1985 to ascertain the purpose of the auditor's duty to take care that the statutory accounts comply with the Act. In the case of an implied contractual duty, the nature and extent of the liability is defined by the term which the law implies. As in the case of any implied term, the process is one of construction of the agreement as a whole in its commercial setting. The contractual duty to provide a valuation and the known purpose of that valuation compel the conclusion that the contract includes a duty of care. The scope of the duty, in the sense of the consequences for which the valuer is responsible, is that which the law regards as best giving effect to the express obligations assumed by the valuer: neither cutting them down so that the lender obtains less than he was reasonably entitled to expect, nor extending them so as to impose on the valuer a liability greater than he could reasonably have thought he was undertaking.

16. What therefore should be the extent of the valuer's liability? The Court of Appeal said that he should be liable for the loss which would not have occurred if he had given the correct advice. The lender having, in reliance on the valuation, embarked upon a transaction which he would not otherwise have undertaken, the valuer should bear all the risks of that transaction, subject only to the limitation that the damage should have been within the reasonable contemplation of the parties.

17. There is no reason in principle why the law should not penalise wrongful conduct by shifting on to the wrongdoer the whole risk of consequences which would not have happened but for the wrongful act. Hart and Honoré, in Causation in the Law, 2nd ed. (1985), p. 120, say that it would, for example, be perfectly intelligible to have a rule by which an unlicensed driver was responsible for all the consequences of his having driven, even if they were unconnected with his not having a licence. One might adopt such a rule in the interests of deterring unlicensed driving. But that is not the normal rule. One may compare, for example, The Empire Jamaica [1955] P. 259, in which a collision was caused by a "blunder in seamanship of ... a somewhat serious and startling character" (Sir Raymond Evershed M.R., at p. 264) by an uncertificated second mate. Although the owners knew that the mate was not certificated and it was certainly the case that the collision would not have happened if he had not been employed, it was held in limitation proceedings that the damage took place without the employers" "actual fault or privity" (section 503 of the Merchant Shipping Act 1894) because the mate was in fact experienced and (subject to this one aberration) competent. The collision was not therefore attributable to his not having a certificate. The owners were not treated as responsible for all the consequences of having employed an uncertificated mate but only for the consequences of his having been uncertificated.

18. Rules which make the wrongdoer liable for all the consequences of his wrongful conduct are exceptional and need to be justified by some special policy. Normally the law limits liability to those consequences which are attributable to that which made the act wrongful. In the case of liability in negligence for providing inaccurate information, this would mean liability for the consequences of the information being inaccurate.

19. I can illustrate the difference between the ordinary principle and that adopted by the Court of Appeal by an example. A mountaineer about to undertake a difficult climb is concerned about the fitness of his knee. He goes to a doctor who negligently makes a superficial examination and pronounces the knee fit. The climber goes on the expedition, which he would not have undertaken if the doctor had told him the true state of his knee. He suffers an injury which is an entirely foreseeable consequence of mountaineering but has nothing to do with his knee.

20. On the Court of Appeal"s principle, the doctor is responsible for the injury suffered by the mountaineer because it is damage which would not have occurred if he had been given correct information about his knee. He would not have gone on the expedition and would have suffered no injury. On what I have suggested is the more usual principle, the doctor is not liable. The injury has not been caused by the doctor"s bad advice because it would have occurred even if the advice had been correct.

21. The Court of Appeal [1995] Q.B. 375 summarily rejected the application of the latter principle to the present case, saying, at p. 404:

"The complaint made and upheld against the valuers in these cases is. . . not that they were wrong. A professional opinion may be wrong without being negligent. The complaint in each case is that the valuer expressed an opinion that the land was worth more than any careful and competent valuer would have advised."

I find this reasoning unsatisfactory. It seems to be saying that the valuer"s liability should be restricted to the consequences of the valuation being wrong if he had warranted that it was correct but not if he had only promised to use reasonable care to see that it was correct. There are of course differences between the measure of damages for breach of warranty and for injury caused by negligence, to which I shall return. In the case of liability for providing inaccurate information, however, it would seem paradoxical that the liability of a person who warranted the accuracy of the information should be less than that of a person who gave no such warranty but failed to take reasonable care.

22. Your Lordships might, I would suggest, think that there was something wrong with a principle which, in the example which I have given, produced the result that the doctor was liable. What is the reason for this feeling? I think that the Court of Appeal"s principle offends common sense because it makes the doctor responsible for consequences which, though in general terms foreseeable, do not appear to have a sufficient causal connection with the subject matter of the duty. The doctor was asked for information on only one of the considerations which might affect the safety of the mountaineer on the expedition. There seems no reason of policy which requires that the negligence of the doctor should require the transfer to him of all the foreseeable risks of the expedition.

23. I think that one can to some extent generalise the principle upon which this response depends. It is that a person under a duty to take reasonable care to provide information on which someone else will decide upon a course of action is, if negligent, not generally regarded as responsible for all the consequences of that course of action. He is responsible only for the consequences of the information being wrong. A duty of care which imposes upon the informant responsibility for losses which would have occurred even if the information which he gave had been correct is not in my view fair and reasonable as between the parties. It is therefore inappropriate either as an implied term of a contract or as a tortious duty arising from the relationship between them.

24. The principle thus stated distinguishes between a duty to provide information for the purpose of enabling someone else to decide upon a course of action and a duty to advise someone as to what course of action he should take. If the duty is to advise whether or not a course of action should be taken, the adviser must take reasonable care to consider all the potential consequences of that course of action. If he is negligent, he will therefore be responsible for all the foreseeable loss which is a consequence of that course of action having been taken. If his duty is only to supply information, he must take reasonable care to ensure that the information is correct and, if he is negligent, will be responsible for all the foreseeable consequences of the information being wrong.

== Significance ==
The effect of the SAAMCO case was to exclude from liability the damages attributable to a fall in the property market notwithstanding that those losses were foreseeable in the sense of being “not unlikely” (property values go down as well as up) and had been caused by the negligent valuation in the sense that, but for the valuation, the bank would not have lent at all and there was no evidence to show that it would have lost its money in some other way. It was excluded on the ground that it was outside the scope of the liability which the parties would reasonably have considered that the valuer was undertaking.

Subsequent case law has drawn a distinction between cases merely providing information, and those providing advice. The principle in SAAMCO cannot be invoked in cases where investment advisers specifically direct an investor to make a specific investment (see Rubenstein v HSBC Bank plc and Aneco Reinsurance Underwriting Ltd (in liquidation) v Johnson & Higgins Ltd), though it may be rather difficult to carefully demarcate where information ends and directed investment advice begins.

== See also ==
- English contract law
- Transfield Shipping Inc v Mercator Shipping Inc [2008] UKHL 48
