= Occupiers' liability in English law =

Occupiers' liability is a field of tort law, codified in statute, which concerns the duty of care owed by those who occupy real property, through ownership or lease, to people who visit or trespass. It deals with liability that may arise from accidents caused by the defective or dangerous condition of the premises. In English law, occupiers' liability towards visitors is regulated in the Occupiers' Liability Act 1957. In addition, occupiers' liability to trespassers is provided under the Occupiers' Liability Act 1984. Although the law largely codified the earlier common law, the difference between a "visitor" and a "trespasser", and the definition of an "occupier" continue to rely on cases for their meaning.

== Who is an occupier? ==
Neither Occupiers' Liability Act defines "occupier". The definition must be sought in case law. The currently applicable test for the status of "occupier" is the degree of occupational control. The more control a person has over certain premises, the more likely that person is to be considered "occupier" for the purposes of the two Occupiers' Liability Acts. More than one person at the same time can have the status of occupier.

=== Tenants and licensees ===
Both tenants and licensees will be occupiers of property where they live. Licensees will usually share the status of occupier with the owner.

=== Owners ===
Owners of let property will be occupiers of those areas which they have not let by demise and over which they have retained control (such as the common staircase in flat building). If the tenancy agreement imposes upon the owner the duty to carry out repairs, he will be co-responsible with the tenant for the conditions of the premises as occupier.

=== Independent contractors ===
Independent contractors working on the property may also be covered by the concept of "occupier" if they exercise sufficient control over the premises.

== Occupiers' Liability Act 1957 ==
=== "Visitor" ===
The Occupiers' Liability Act 1957 regulates occupiers' liability to visitors. S 1(2) of the Act defines “visitors” as persons to whom the occupier gives (or is to be treated as giving) an invitation or permission to enter or use the premises. In other words, visitors are persons who have the express or implied permission of the occupier to be on the premises. A visitor who exceeds the occupier's permission, e.g. by going to the part of the premises where he was told by the occupier not to go, or by outstaying his leave, will become a trespasser and will fall outside the sphere of application of the Act. He will then be in the sphere of application of the Occupiers' Liability Act 1984, with lower standards of protection.

"Visitors" for the purposes of the Act are also “persons who enter premises for any purpose in the exercise of a right ... whether they in fact have [the occupier's] permission or not.” Police carrying out a lawful search, or firefighters in the exercise of their duties will fall into this category.

=== "Premises" ===
S 1(3) of the Act defines premises as “fixed or movable structures, including any vessel, vehicle or aircraft.” Nevertheless, occupiers of vehicles are rarely sued by passengers under the Occupiers’ Liability Act, usually relying on Common Law Negligence.

=== Scope of duty ===
The Occupier's Liability Act 1957 imposes upon the occupier a duty of care. The occupier must "take such care as in all the circumstances of the case is reasonable to see that the visitor will be reasonably safe in using the premises for the purposes for which he is invited or permitted by the occupier to be there". The standard of care an occupier is expected to meet is the standard of "a reasonable occupier", no different from the usual common law negligence standard of care. Under Australian Law the Scope and content of a duty of care depends on 6 main factors. (1) magnitude of the risk as perceived by the reasonable occupier; (2) degree of probability of its occurrence; (3) expense, difficulty and inconvenience of taking precautions; (4) obviousness of the harm; (5) type of occupier (6) degree of the entrant’s skill or knowledge.

==== Children ====
Section 2(3)(a) provides that an occupier must be prepared for children to be less careful than adults. As a result, a higher standard of care is expected from the occupier when children are visiting his premises. For example, if a city authority plants a bush with poisonous berries in a public park, it should fence it off in case the children visiting the park are tempted to eat these berries. However, an occupier may reasonably expect that his child visitors be accompanied by their parents or other guardians, who will look after them. Therefore, it had been held that the occupier will have discharged his duty toward a child if he had made the premises reasonably safe for the child accompanied by the kind of guardian that he can expect them to be accompanied by in the circumstances.

==== Specialist visitors ====
Section 2(3)(b) provides that professional visitors, i.e. persons in the exercise of their skill, should "appreciate and guard against any special risk ordinary incident to [the exercise of the skill]". This means that the occupier need not exercise special care to prevent injury to persons who have come to repair the premises or perform other special services in them. So, the family of chimney sweeps which negligently entered the occupier's chimney while his boiler was on and suffocated could not recover against the occupier of the premises: the risk they decided to take should have been known to them as part of their profession and they should have guarded against it.

=== Liability for others ===
The occupier will not normally be liable for damage caused by the negligence of persons who were carrying out work on his premises, such as independent contractors. So, if damage was caused by a faulty maintenance of lifts, the occupier will not be liable because this damage was the result of other persons' negligence. Nevertheless, if the occupier:

- was not reasonable in employing the contractor;
- did not make sure that the contractor was sufficiently competent; or
- did not properly supervise the contractor’s work,

he may still be liable under s.2(4)(b) of the Occupiers' Liability Act 1957.

== Occupiers' Liability Act 1984 ==
=== "Persons, other than visitors" ===
The Occupiers' Liability Act 1984 applies to "persons, other than visitors". In practice, these are usually what is referred to as trespassers. In Robert Addie & Sons (Colliery) Ltd v. Dumbreck [1929] AC 358 Lord Dunedin had defined "trespasser" as follows:

"A trespasser is a person who goes upon land without invitation of any sort and whose presence is unknown to the proprietor or, if known, is practically objected to."

=== Scope of duty ===
The scope of duty under the 1984 Act is much narrower than under the 1957 Act. An occupier will only owe trespassers a duty to care for their safety:

- in respect of risks of which the occupier knows or has reasonable grounds to believe that they exist;
- if he knows or has reasonable grounds to believe that the [trespasser] is in the vicinity of the risks;
- if the risk is one against which he can be expected to offer some protection in the circumstances.

Whether the risk is one against which the occupier may be expected to offer some protection will depend on various relevant factors, which include:

- The nature of the premises (how dangerous are they? A private house? An electrified railway line?);
- The nature of the danger (hidden or obvious and the degree of danger);
- The extent of the risk (is there a high or low risk of injury?);
- The gravity of possible injury;
- The age of the trespasser;
- The nature and character of entry (e.g. burglar, child trespasser or adult inadvertently trespassing);
- The foreseeability of the trespasser (i.e. the more likely people are to trespass, the more precautions must be taken).

== Occupiers' liability and negligence ==
A claim under one of the Occupiers' Liability Acts does not exclude a simultaneous claim in negligence, known as suing "in the alternative". Very often, both claims are brought at the same time.

As in negligence, once the claimant has proved that the defendant was in breach of his duty towards him under the Occupiers' Liability Act, he must go on to prove damage and factual and legal causation. Defences, such as contributory negligence, assumption of risk, ex turpi causa etc. will equally apply to actions under the Occupiers' Liability Acts.

== Case list ==
- Glasgow Corporation v Taylor [1922] 1 AC 44
- Robert Addie & Sons (Colliery) Ltd v Dumbreck [1929] AC 358
- Phipps v Rochester Corporation [1955] 1 QB 450
- Roles v Nathan [1963] 1 W.L.R. 1117, concerning chimney sweeps' inability to claim compensation for a dangerous work environment
- Wheat v E Lacon & Co Ltd [1966] 1 All ER 582, concerning the definition of "occupier"
- Ward v Tesco Stores Ltd [1976] 1 W.L.R. 810, on res ipsa loquitor; the liability of a supermarket to compensate for anyone slipping on premises (on pink yoghurt or otherwise)
- Titchener v British Railway Board [1983] 1 WLR 1427
- Ratcliff v McConnell and Another [1999] 1 WLR 670; a failed claim by a trespasser who was injured by diving into the shallow part of a swimming pool when it was closed to visitors;
- Gwilliam v West Hertfordshire Hospital NHS [2002] EWCA Civ 1041, on the possible 'duty to insure' one's property
- Tomlinson v Congleton Borough Council [2003] 3 All ER 1122; a failed claim of a diver left paralysed after diving into a lake where a sign "no diving" was put up
- Donoghue v Folkestone Properties Ltd 2003

== See also ==
- Occupiers' Liability Act 1957
- Occupiers' Liability Act 1984
