= Vorster v Santam =

Case in South African law

Vorster v Santam Insurance Co Ltd and Another is an important case in South African law, in particular the law of delict. It was heard from 17 to 19 November, 1972, with judgment handed down on 22 November.

== Facts ==
One Sunday afternoon, a 1961 Vauxhall, insured by Santam, and a 1964 Fiat raced down a country road with a sharp bend in it. The cars were driven by their respective owners, each with one passenger. Voster, the Fiat's passenger, had staked R10 on the race.

His driver, Conradie attempted to overtake the Vauxhall as it slowed down for the bend. When the cars were partly alongside each other, there was a glancing collision between the two, causing Conradie to lose control, and the Fiat to leave the road in the bend at about 70 mph. The car went headlong through the veld and was shortly overturned.

Severely injured in the accident, Vorster sued Conradie and Santam for damages. The insurance company set up the defence of volenti non fit injuria and, as an alternative, contributory negligence by Conradie.

== Findings ==
The court held that both drivers had been negligent, and that the negligence of each was equally to blame. Vorster had been volens in respect of the mechanical hazards, over which the drivers had no reasonable or immediate control; he had not been volens, however, in respect of the acts of negligence on the part of the two drivers. The court found, on the evidence, that the collision had been caused by these acts of negligence, not by any defects in the cars themselves; accordingly, the defence of volenti non fit injuria failed.

The court held further the plaintiff, as regards entering into the unlawful race, was "in it" with the other two, and that he should therefore share the blame equally with them. The defendants were each liable, therefore, to make good to the plaintiff one third of his damages, and to pay his costs.
