= Connecticut Liquor Division =

State government agency of Connecticut, US

The Connecticut Liquor Division is a Connecticut state government agency responsible for enforcing Title 30 (The Connecticut Liquor Control Act) and its corresponding regulations. It serves as the primary investigative arm of the Connecticut Liquor Control Commission.

== Compliance ==
Much of the Division's workload concerns compliance, meaning the investigation, citation, and suspension of licensed premises.
