= Inter Arma Enim Silent Leges (Star Trek: Deep Space Nine) =

- Star Trek: Deep Space Nine episode
- Episode no.: Season 7 Episode 16
- Directed by: David Livingston
- Written by: Ronald D. Moore
- Production code: 565
- Original air date: March 1, 1999

Guest appearances
- Adrienne Barbeau as Cretak; John Fleck as Koval; Barry Jenner as Admiral Ross; Hal Landon Jr. as Neral; Andrew Robinson as Elim Garak; William Sadler as Luther Sloan

Episode chronology
← Previous "Badda-Bing Badda-Bang"	Next → "Penumbra"
- Star Trek: Deep Space Nine season 7

"Inter Arma Enim Silent Leges" is the 166th episode of the television series Star Trek: Deep Space Nine, the 16th episode of the seventh season. The episode title means "In times of war, the law falls silent" and is paraphrased from Cicero. The episode was written by Ron Moore and directed by David Livingston.

Set in the 24th century, the series follows the adventures of the crew of the Starfleet-managed Bajoran space station Deep Space Nine. The later seasons of the series follow a war between the United Federation of Planets and an expansionist empire known as the Dominion; the Federation maintains a shaky alliance with the devious Romulan empire. In this episode, station physician Julian Bashir is recruited by Section 31, the Federation's shadowy black ops division, to spy on the Romulans during a conference to manipulate Romulan politics to the Federation's benefit. This continues the story of Section 31, which was first introduced in the sixth-season episode "Inquisition".

It had Nielsen ratings of 4.1 points (about 4 million viewers) when it was broadcast on television in 1999.

== Plot ==
As Bashir prepares for a conference on Romulus, Section 31 agent Luther Sloan appears with an assignment for him. Captain Sisko advises him to accept it, in order to learn more about the secretive agency.

Bashir is asked to determine whether Koval, the anti-Federation head of the Romulan Tal Shiar and a candidate for the influential Continuing Committee, has the degenerative Tuvan syndrome. Bashir discusses the issue with Admiral William Ross, who says it would be better for the Federation if Senator Cretak were appointed to the committee instead.

Bashir meets Koval at the conference, and later tells Sloan that he believes Koval does have Tuvan syndrome. Sloan asks how the disease could be accelerated. Bashir, suspecting that Sloan is plotting a covert assassination, informs Admiral Ross, who plans to have Sloan arrested. Ross muses that Sloan could have an accomplice on Romulus.

Before Sloan can be arrested, Bashir overhears that Ross has suffered an aneurysm. With nowhere else to turn, Bashir tells Cretak of his suspicions about Sloan. Cretak agrees to help Bashir identify Sloan's accomplice by giving him classified Tal Shiar information.

The next day, Koval has Bashir arrested and tortured. Bashir and Cretak are brought before the Continuing Committee, and Bashir tells them about the Section 31 plot against Koval. Koval brings in Sloan, badly beaten, and says Section 31 does not exist; Sloan is merely a renegade Starfleet officer obsessed with getting revenge for his mentor's death. The committee convicts Cretak of treason for planning to share Tal Shiar intelligence with Bashir; Sloan is to be held for further interrogation. Enraged, Sloan grabs a guard's weapon; Koval fires first, vaporizing Sloan.

That night, Bashir demands the truth from Admiral Ross. Off the record, Ross reveals that Koval is working for Starfleet. The real mission was to discredit Cretak, who would abandon the Federation alliance if she thought it in the best interest of the Romulans, and get Koval onto the committee. Sloan was transported away just before he was shot. Bashir is disgusted that the Federation would resort to such machinations.

Back aboard Deep Space Nine, Sloan appears in Bashir's quarters, explaining that he needed a man of conscience for the operation—that the Federation needs men of conscience, but it also needs men like Sloan. After he leaves, Bashir calls station security, but catches himself and says it was nothing, as Sloan is already gone.

== Production ==
The episode's title is a paraphrase from Cicero's Pro Milone, Latin for "In times of war, the law falls silent," and is a line spoken in the episode.

The scenes filmed on the Federation starship USS Bellerophon were the sets of the USS Voyager used for Star Trek: Voyager, both ships being Intrepid-class.

Guest star Hal Landon Jr. takes over from Norman Large as Neral, last seen in Star Trek: The Next Generation episode "Unification". Adrienne Barbeau plays Cretak, a character previously played by Megan Cole in the episodes "Image in the Sand" and "Shadows and Symbols".

== Reception ==
Keith R. A. DeCandido of Tor.com gave it six out of ten. He was dissatisfied with the ending, but praised the "crackling dialogue" and the scenes with Sadler and Siddig, which he called "a magnificent showcase for both of them". He also praised the Romulans, Adrienne Barbeau for her nuanced performance and John Fleck for his controlled delivery.

io9 rated "Inter Arma Enim Silent Leges" as the 35th best of all Star Trek television episodes.

In 2015, Geek.com recommended this episode as "essential watching" for their abbreviated Star Trek: Deep Space Nine binge-watching guide.
