= Directors and officers liability insurance =

Type of liability insurance

Directors and officers liability insurance (also written directors' and officers' liability insurance; often called D&O) is liability insurance payable to the directors and officers of a company, or to the organization itself, as indemnification (reimbursement) for losses or advancement of defense costs in the event an insured suffers such a loss as a result of a legal action brought for alleged wrongful acts in their capacity as directors and officers. Such coverage may extend to defense costs arising from criminal and regulatory investigations or trials as well; in fact, often civil and criminal actions are brought against directors and officers simultaneously. Intentional illegal acts, however, are typically not covered under D&O policies.

It has become closely associated with broader management liability insurance, which covers liabilities of the corporation itself as well as the personal liabilities for the directors and officers of the corporation.

== Background ==
The insurance is closely related to corporate governance, corporations law, and the fiduciary duty owed to shareholders or other beneficiaries. Under the United States business judgment rule, the directors and officers are granted broad discretion in their business activities. In the United States, corporate law is typically at the state level; corporations are often domiciled in Delaware (with one estimate at 97% of American corporations domiciled in either their home state or Delaware) because of its developed corporate law and tax benefits. Publicly traded companies are subject to more federal claims, particularly due to the Securities Act of 1933 and the Securities Exchange Act of 1934.

=== Corporate indemnification ===
In the United States, articles of association often include an indemnification provision holding the officers harmless for losses occurring due to their role in the company. The purchased insurance is typically in addition to this corporate indemnification, or reimburses the corporation. In some states corporations may be mandated to indemnify directors and officers in order to encourage people to take the positions and in most cases the corporations have the option to indemnify their officers. However, in certain cases the corporation may be explicitly forbidden from indemnifying such director or officer. Liabilities which aren't indemnified by the corporation are potentially covered by certain types of D&O insurance (particularly Side-A Broad Form DIC policies).

=== Brief history ===
The insurance was first marketed in the 1930s by Lloyd's, but into the 1960s the volume sold was "negligible". Corporations began to allow for corporate indemnification in the 1940s and 1950s, and the 1960s "merger mania" was followed by costly litigation. In the 1980s, the United States experienced a "D&O crisis" along with the overall liability crisis, with increased premiums, reduced availability, and numerous additional exclusionary clauses in the insurance policy. Due to changes in securities laws in the 1960s, the insurance was sold primarily for the concerns of directors and officers of "personal financial protection" (protecting personal rather than corporate assets), but the coverages have evolved so that personal and corporate indemnification are both considered. The 1995 decision of the Ninth Circuit in Nordstrom, Inc. v. Chubb & Son, Inc. resulted in the emphasis in Side C (corporate entity) coverage. The decision resolved an "allocation problem" of how to allocate costs between individual insureds, as the corporation was typically not insured while individuals were. There is no standard D&O form, but each has shared a similar outline. In 2007 Romania changed its corporate law making D&O insurance compulsory. Romania is the only country in EU to make D&O insurance compulsory.

In Germany, the first attempts to introduce directors and officers liability insurance were made as early as 1895 by the General German Insurance Association. However, its introduction initially failed due to predominantly moral objections. After the United States recognized the usefulness of D&O insurance as early as the 1930s, and after significant lawsuits against managers emerged there in the mid-1980s, this type of insurance became widespread on the market and attracted increasing international attention.

== Coverages ==
Under the "traditional" D&O policy applied to "public companies" (those having securities trading under national securities exchanges etc.), there are three insuring clauses. These insuring clauses are termed Side-A, or "non-indemnified"; Side-B, or "indemnified"; and Side-C, or "entity securities coverage". D&O policies may also provide an additional Side-D clause, which provides for a sublimit for investigative costs coverage related to a shareholder derivative demand. In detail, the coverage clauses provide the following:

- Side-A provides coverage to individual directors and officers when not indemnified by the corporation as a result of state law or financial incapability of the corporation; however, exclusions may apply if a corporation simply refuses to pay the legal defense/loss of a director or officer, or if a bankruptcy court issues an order preventing such indemnification
- Side-B provides coverage for the corporation (organizations) when it indemnifies the directors and officers (corporate reimbursement)
- Side-C provides coverage to the corporation (organizations) itself for securities claims brought against it (NOTE: securities claims only coverage applies to publicly traded companies and large private companies; small private companies may be able to obtain broader "entity" coverage)

More extensive coverage can be obtained for individual directors and officers under a Broad Form Side-A DIC ("Difference in Conditions") policy purchased to not only provide excess Side-A coverage but also to fill the gaps in coverage under the traditional policy, respond when the traditional policy does not, protect the individual directors and officers in the face of U.S. bankruptcy courts deeming the D&O policy part of the bankruptcy estate and otherwise more fully protect the personal assets of individual directors and officers.

=== Claims ===
The types of claims are dependent on the nature of the company. Directors and officers of a corporation may be liable if they damage the corporation in breach of their legal duty, mix personal and business assets, or fail to disclose conflicts of interest. State law may protect the directors and officers from liability (particularly exculpatory provisions under state law relating to directors). Even innocent errors in judgment by executives may precipitate claims.

The types of claims are dependent on the nature of the corporation. For public companies, claims are primarily due to lawsuits by shareholders after financial difficulties, with a 2011 Towers Watson survey finding that 69% of publicly traded company respondents had a claim for a shareholder lawsuit in the past 10 years as opposed to 21% of private companies respondents. Other claims arise from shareholder-derivative actions, creditors (particularly after entering the zone of insolvency), customers, regulators (including those that would bring civil and criminal charges), and competitors (for anti-trust or unfair trade practice allegations). For nonprofits, claims are typically related to employment practices and less commonly regulatory or other fiduciary claims. For private companies, claims are often from competitors or customers for antitrust or deceptive business practices and one survey of 451 executives found that lawsuits cost an average of $308,475.

One relatively neglected area is the personal liability to non-shareholders that directors may face due to torts committed as a result of negligent supervision.

=== Purchase and application ===
D&O insurance is usually purchased by the company itself, even when it is for the sole benefit of directors and officers. Reasons for doing so are many, but commonly would assist a company in attracting and retaining directors. Where a country's legislation prevents the company from purchasing the insurance, a premium split between the directors and the company is often done, so as to demonstrate that the directors have paid a portion of the premium. Problems related to income tax liability may come into play when a corporation avoids country specific liability law in order to protect its individual directors and officers through insurance.

If the company fails to disclose material information or willfully provides inaccurate information, the insurer may avoid payment due to misrepresentation. The "severability clause" in the policy conditions may be intended to protect against this by preventing misconduct by one insured from affecting insurance for other insureds; however, in certain jurisdictions it may be ineffective.

Not all nonprofit organization policies automatically include employment practices liability insurance (EPLI), which accounts for more than 70% of claims under directors and officers liability insurance (D&O) for nonprofit organizations.

=== Criminal acts exclusion ===
Intentional illegal acts or illegal profits are typically not covered under D&O insurance policies; coverage would only extend to "wrongful acts" as defined under the policy, which may include certain acts, omissions, misstatements while acting for the organization. Because of exclusions and as a matter of public policy, coverage is not provided for criminal fraud.

=== Other exclusions ===
Directors and former directors may sue the company, particularly given their inside knowledge and potentially large stake in the organization. However, most D&O policies contain an "insured versus insured" exclusion which may prevent any payment in these circumstances. It is intended to prevent collusion, where an insured company could sue a director and collect the insurance money. However, it is possible to "carve out" this exclusion so that it does not apply to certain cases, such derivative actions, receivership trustees, and whistleblower actions.

Coverage may be "rescinded" (voided, essentially excluded) in some cases, especially if there is some mistake in the application as to the financial details. Non-rescindable coverage may be purchased in some cases which can prevent this lack of coverage. Also, claims that come about from an issue that was known before the insurance was bought are rejected. If you hide this information, it can make the policy void for non-disclosure.

== Motivation and controversy ==
Directors and officers insurance is provided so that competent professionals can serve as supervisors of organizations without fear of personal financial loss. Directors are typically not managing the day-to-day operations of the organization and therefore cannot ensure that the organization will be successful; further, business is inherently risky. Thus, the business judgment rule has developed to shield directors in most instances.

However, insuring negligence in supervising organizations, or wrongful acts and misrepresentation in financial statements is controversial due to its effect on accountability, otherwise known as the moral hazard problem. In the United States, corporate boards have a "duty of care", but if personal financial consequences for violating that duty of care are lacking, the boards may not perform proper due diligence. In the famous case of Smith v. Van Gorkom (1985), the Delaware Supreme Court found a board grossly negligent and therefore liable. The decision created a backlash and a statute change in Delaware which allowed a corporation to amend its charter to eliminate directors' personal liability for violation of the duty of care; a version of this statute has been passed in all states, and most large corporations have such an "exculpatory clause".

In some cases scholars propose that the risk of personal liability for corporate officers be increased.

Directors and officers liability insurance (D&O) is often supplemented by insurance for so-called outside-director mandates (ODL), i.e., when a company's own employees are seconded to serve on the boards of other companies. The gradual expansion of corporate insurance coverage into criminal matters is provided by crime coverage in the corporate sector and by fidelity/fraud insurance (primarily covering offenses committed by employees).

=== Empirical research ===
One empirical study found that increased D&O insurance is associated with reduced shareholder benefits from mergers and acquisitions.

=== Monitoring role ===
Since insurance companies ultimately bear costs for negligent management, theoretically, insurance companies may enforce better management practices and reduce moral hazard. Empirical research, however, has not found that insurance companies perform effective monitoring of management.

=== Berkshire Hathaway ===
Berkshire Hathaway, the holding company managed by Warren Buffett, does not purchase D&O insurance for its directors, unlike most similar companies. Warren Buffett believes that the directors should face consequences of their mistakes the way that other shareholders do. Notably, however, this statement overlooks the holding-company structure of Berkshire Hathaway, auxiliary indemnification agreements with Buffett, and the individual operating companies may still purchase such insurance.

== Market size and vendors ==
In the United States, total direct premiums written amounted to about $2.9 billion from 2013 to 2014, with Axa XL as the market leader with 15% market share according to analysts at Fitch Ratings.

The leaders in the provision of directors and officers liability insurance include Axa XL, AIG, Chubb Limited, Tokio Marine HCC, The Travelers Companies, CNA Financial, Berkshire Hathaway, and Sompo Group via Sompo Japan Nipponkoa Insurance, among many others.

In the United Kingdom, the majority of contracts are facilitated on behalf of policyholders by intermediary brokers.
