= Titchener v British Rlys Board =

1983 House of Lords legal case concerning occupiers' liability

Titchener v British Railways Board
- Court: House of Lords
- Decided: 24 Nov 1983
- Citation: 1984 SC (HL) 34; [1983] UKHL 10; [1983] 3 All ER 770; [1983] 1 WLR 1427; 1984 SLT 192; SC (HL) 34

Court membership
- Judges sitting: Lord Hailsham of St. Marylebone, Lord Chancellor and Lord Fraser of Tullybelton

Keywords
- Torts, Negligence

Titchener v British Railway Board [1983] 1 WLR 1427 is a Scottish delict case concerning occupiers' liability, decided by the House of Lords.

== Facts ==
Miss Titchener, a 15-year-old girl, climbed through a gap in a fence onto a railway line owned by the British Railways Board. She was hit by a train. She sued the board under the Occupiers' Liability (Scotland) Act 1960 for failing in their common duty of care to keep the premises reasonably safe for visitors.

The Inner House of the Court of Session held that the pursuer had taken a chance, fully aware of the risks involved and that the Board had no responsibility to maintain the fence any more than they had.

== Judgment ==
The House of Lords dismissed the pursuer's final appeal, holding that she was not owed any duty under the Occupiers' Liability (Scotland) Act 1960 on the grounds that she had voluntarily decided to run the risk of walking on the railway line. As such, the defender had no duty, at least in relation to the pursuer, to maintain the fence any better than they had, based on the principle of volenti non fit injuria.

== Other cases ==
The following cases were referred to in this judgment:

- Slater v Clay Cross Co Ltd—distinguished

== See also ==
- Tomlinson v Congleton Borough Council
- Donoghue v Folkestone Properties Ltd
