= Premise (disambiguation) =

A premise is a proposition used in an argument to prove the truth of another proposition.

Premise (from the Latin praemissa [propositio], meaning "placed in front") may also refer to:

- Premises, land and buildings together considered as a property
- Premise (narrative), the situational logic driving the plot in plays
- Premise, a trade name for the insecticide Imidacloprid
