= Defective Premises Act 1972 =

Act of the Parliament of the United Kingdom

Defective Premises Act 1972 (Note: Section 7(1).)
- Act of Parliament
- Parliament of the United Kingdom
- Long title: An Act to impose duties in connection with the provision of dwellings and otherwise to amend the law of England and Wales as to liability for injury or damage caused to persons through defects in the state of premises.
- Citation: 1972 c. 35
- Territorial extent: England and Wales (Note: Section 7(3).)

Dates
- Royal assent: 29 June 1972
- Commencement: 1 January 1974 (Note: Section 7(2).)
Other legislation
Amends	Occupiers' Liability Act 1957
Amended by	Building Safety Act 2022
Relates to	Occupiers' Liability Act 1957

Status: Amended

Text of statute as originally enacted

Revised text of statute as amended

Text of the Defective Premises Act 1972 as in force today (including any amendments) within the United Kingdom, from legislation.gov.uk.

The Defective Premises Act 1972 (c. 35) is an act of the Parliament of the United Kingdom that covers landlords' and builders' liability for poorly constructed and poorly maintained buildings, along with any injuries that may result. During the 19th century, the common law principle that a landlord could not be liable for letting a poorly maintained house was established, while a long-running principle was that, in practice, builders could not be sued for constructing defective buildings. The courts began to turn against the first principle during the 20th century, imposing several restrictions on the landlord's immunity, but the landlord was still largely free from being sued.

The Defective Premises Bill was introduced to the House of Commons as a private member's bill by Ivor Richard on 1 December 1971, and given royal assent on 29 June 1972, coming into force as the Defective Premises Act 1972 on 1 January 1974. The act establishes a duty of care builders and their sub-contractors owe to the occupiers of property they construct or modify, and also establishes a duty of care landlords hold towards their tenants and any third parties who might be injured by their failure to maintain or repair property. The act received a mixed reaction from critics; while some complimented it on its simple nature compared to the previously complex common rule laws, others felt that it was too limited for what was desired to be achieved, and that the wording used was at times both too vague and too specific.

== Background ==
Prior to the passing of the act, builders who constructed defective buildings could not, practically, be sued under tort. At the same time, a landlord who let a dilapidated or defective house could not be sued for injuries suffered by non-tenants, something based first on the "Privity of Tort" principle that was overturned in Donoghue v Stevenson [1932] AC 562 (that if A had a contract with B and in the process injured C, C was prevented from suing A because of the contract with B) and the decision in Robbins v Jones [1863] 15 CB (ns) 221, where Chief Justice Earl said that "a landlord who lets a house in a dangerous state is not liable for accidents happening during the term; for, fraud apart, there is no law against letting a tumbledown house". This immunity was further extended in later cases.

The courts began to turn against this position in the 20th century; the case of Cunard v Antifyre [1933] 1 KB 551 established that a landlord could be liable if the source of an injury emanated from property of which he was in possession, even if the injury happened on land he no longer owned or occupied. In Dutton v Bognor Regis Urban District Council [1972] 1 QB 373, the courts arguably abolished the immunity of the landlord completely. By 1974, this immunity excluded situations where the danger came from premises that the landlord occupied and where the landlord actively created a danger, and only included the landlord, not associated people.

The Defective Premises Bill was introduced to the House of Commons as a private member's bill by Ivor Richard on 1 December 1971, and was not debated at all in the Commons, something the academic lawyer Peter North called "remarkable". There was some debate in the House of Lords, with questions and amendments covering Section 1, but the bill was not substantially amended, something North puts down to the quality of the draft prepared by the Law Commission. The act was given royal assent on 29 June 1972, and came into force on 1 January 1974.

== Provisions ==
=== Duty of care ===
Section 1 of the act lays out the duty of care and who it applies to. The duty applies to "A person taking on work for or in connection with the provision of a dwelling (whether the dwelling is provided by the erection or by the conversion or enlargement of a building)", something including not only builders but also electricians, plumbers and other subcontractors. The duty also extends to those who have statutory powers to arrange for the provision of dwellings, and those who do so in the course of business. This duty is owed to two classes of people; the person ordering the house, and also every person who later takes an equitable and legal interest in the house.

The duty itself is laid out in Section 1(1), and is a duty on the people covered by the act "to see that the work which he takes on is done in a workmanlike or, as the case may be, professional manner, with proper materials and so that as regards that work the dwelling will be fit for habitation when completed". This is a three-part test, all parts of which must be fulfilled. Those owing a duty can be released from their obligations if they are acting according to the claimant's instructions, under Section 1(2). If they act completely in accordance with the instructions, the duty of care is fulfilled even though the house may not be properly constructed. However, if the claimant instructs the builder to construct a poorly designed and unstable building, the builder has a duty to warn the claimant. Section 2 of the act excludes "approved scheme" constructions, such as those run by the National House Building Council.

=== Disposal of premises ===
Prior to the passage of the act, the owner of premises who created a danger there disposed of his duty of care when he disposed of the property by selling or leasing it, something North described as both "bizarre" and "capricious in operation, unjust in the result and indefensible in principle". Section 3(1) of the act, therefore, establishes that where work is done on premises, whatever duty of care may arise as a result of the work to people affected by defects in the work is not disposed of if the property is sold or let. Section 3(2) qualifies this principle by providing exceptions, which are when the property is the subject of a tenancy and when the property has been disposed of (or is in the process of being disposed of) before 1 January 1974, when the act came into force.

=== Landlord's duty of care ===
Prior to the passage of the Occupiers' Liability Act 1957 (5 & 6 Eliz. 2. c. 31), the general principle was that landlords were not liable for injuries suffered by third parties on their property. The 1957 act qualified this, providing in section 4 (repealed by the Defective Premises Act 1972) that where a landlord was obligated by his tenant to repair property and he breached this obligation, third parties injured as a result of the breach would be able to claim providing that the tenant could. This provision was limited; it provided no remedy to the tenant himself, and only applied to lawful visitors, not trespassers. In addition, it only came into effect if the landlord was obliged to repair the property; if he simply had the option to do so, there was no remedy for an injured third party. Similarly, if a tenant failed to inform the landlord of something needing repair, any resulting injury could not be sued upon.

Section 4 of the act includes new provisions to cover this sort of situation. Section 4(1) establishes a general duty to repair and maintain the property, owed by the landlord to anyone who could reasonably be expected to be harmed by a breach; this includes tenants, their friends and family and also trespassers. This duty applies when a landlord ought to have known of a defect, not just when he has been informed of a defect. Additionally, a landlord who merely has the right to repair property rather than an obligation to do so may still be found liable, if one of the groups described in Section 4 was harmed by their failure to repair.

=== Miscellaneous ===
The act includes a number of miscellaneous points, mainly in Sections 5 and 6. The act and its provisions are taken to extend to The Crown, which can be held tortiously liable to the extent laid out in the Crown Proceedings Act 1947 (10 & 11 Geo. 6. c. 44). It repeals Section 4 of the Occupiers' Liability Act 1957 (5 & 6 Eliz. 2. c. 31), replacing it with Section 4 of this act, and unlike the 1957 act does not allow any provisions or duties to be excluded or restricted.

== Commentary and further territorial extent ==
The act met a mixed review from academics. North praised it, saying that "The Act admirably disposes of confusion, controversy, illogicality and point-less distinctions", while admitting that the vagueness of much of it left it up to the courts to flesh out the statute. Others were more critical; academic Vera Bermingham pointed out that the exclusion of liability for "approved scheme" buildings under Section 2 at the time included almost all new houses built within the United Kingdom, although these schemes have been much reduced since the 1980s. At the same time, actions brought under the act are the subject of a six-year limitation period starting on the date the dwelling is completed, regardless of when the defect is discovered, which is a "significant [drawback] in the utility of the [Act]". Academic John Spencer criticised both Section 1 and Section 3, the former for being too vaguely worded and the latter for being too specific. Spencer argues that, because of limitations imposed by the bill's sponsors, the original meaning of the draft bill was changed, and the act itself goes no further than the existing common law.

The Defective Premises (Northern Ireland) Order 1975 brought identical provisions into force in Northern Ireland on 1 January 1976, with the section covering injuries to third parties excluded.

== Subsequent developments ==
Section 1(5) was amended, and section 2A was inserted, by sections 135(2) and 134(1) of the Building Safety Act 2022, which came into force on 28 June 2022. Section 2A extends the duty to see that work is done in a workmanlike or professional manner to persons who take on work in the course of a business in relation to a building that consists of or contains dwellings, and it applies to work completed after that date. Section 135 of the 2022 act also inserted section 4B into the Limitation Act 1980, which extends the limitation period for actions under section 1 or 2A to fifteen years, or thirty years for rights of action that arose before that date. These changes replaced the six-year limitation period described above.

== Bibliography ==
- Bermingham, Vera; Carol Brennan (2008). Tort Law. Oxford University Press. ISBN 978-0-19-922798-3.
- Elliott, Catherine; Francis Quinn (2007). Tort Law (6th ed.). Pearson Longman. ISBN 978-1-4058-4672-1.
- North, P.M. (1973). "Defective Premises Act 1972". Modern Law Review. 36 (6). Blackwell Publishing.
- Spencer, J.R. (1975). "The Defective Premises Act 1972. Defective Law and Defective Law Reform". The Cambridge Law Journal. 34 (1). Cambridge University Press: 48–78. doi:10.1017/S0008197300092084. ISSN 0008-1973.
