= Wooldridge v Sumner =

English court case

- Court: Court of Appeal
- Citations: [1962] EWCA Civ 3, [1963] 2 QB 43, [1962] 3 WLR 616, [1962] 2 All ER 978

Keywords
- Volenti, breach of duty

Wooldridge v Sumner [1962] EWCA Civ 3 is an English Court of Appeal judgment dealing with the liability in negligence of participants in sporting competitions towards spectators. The Court of Appeal held in this case that sportsmen would only be liable to spectators if they showed "reckless disregard" for their safety.

== Facts ==
The plaintiff, Mr. Wooldridge, who was a photographer at a horse race, was injured by the horse belonging to the defendant, Sumner, which was ridden in a competition by Ron Holladay, who was a skilled and experienced horseman.

== Judgment ==
The Court of Appeal held that Sumner owed no duty of care to Wooldridge in this case. As a spectator, Wooldridge accepted the risks involved in a horserace he came to watch. As a reasonable participant in the race, which is a fast and competitive sport, the horseman was expected to concentrate on the race and not on the spectator. In the course of a fast moving competition such as this one, he could be expected to make errors of judgment. As long as the damage was not caused recklessly or deliberately, the participant in a race could not be held liable for the spectators injuries because he was not negligent, i.e. not in breach of his duty.

The case is also known for the commentary by Lord Justice Diplock on the maxim of volenti non fit injuria that "in the absence of expressed contract", it "has no application to negligence simpliciter where the duty of care is based solely upon proximity or "neighbourship" in the Atkinian sense".

== See also ==
- Negligence
- English tort law
- Duty of care
- Breach of duty in English law
- Volenti non fit injuria
- Harrison v Vincent
