= Donoghue v Folkestone Properties Ltd =

2003 English court case concerning occupier's liability

- Court: Court of Appeal of England and Wales
- Full case name: John Simon Donoghue v Folkestone Properties Limited
- Decided: 27 February 2003
- Neutral citation: [2003] EWCA Civ 231
- Cases cited: Tomlinson v Congleton Borough Council [2003] UKHL 47
- Legislation cited: Occupiers' Liability Act 1984

Case history
- Appealed from: High Court of Justice (Queen's Bench Division)

Court membership
- Judges sitting: Lord Phillips of Worth Matravers, Mr Lord Justice Brooke, Lord Justice Laws

Case opinions
- Appeal allowed. Folkestone Properties owed no duty to Mr Donoghue and should not have been held under any liability for his accident. Claimant's claim dismissed and judgment entered for the Defendant.
- Decision by: Lord Phillips of Worth Matravers
- Concurrence: Mr Lord Justice Brooke, Lord Justice Laws

Keywords
- Duty of care, occupiers' liability, trespassers

Donoghue v Folkestone Properties Limited [2003] EWCA Civ 231, QB 1008, 2 WLR 1138, 3 All ER 1101 is an English court case heard in the Court of Appeal of England and Wales concerning the tort of occupiers' liability from the Occupiers' Liability Act 1984.

== Litigation ==
The case was originally heard by His Honour Judge Bowers in the Queen's Bench Division of the High Court of Justice of England and Wales. Here, the claimant succeeded, though was forced to concede his duty was owed to him under the Occupiers' Liability Act 1984, which deals with trespassers, as opposed to the Occupiers' Liability Act 1957, which deals with lawful visitors. The claimant also had his damages reduced by 75% due to his contributory negligence. The subsequent appeal from the defendant (against the imposition of a duty of care) was heard in the Court of Appeal of England and Wales by three Lords Justice of Appeal: Lord Phillips of Worth Matravers MR, Lord Justice Brooke, and Lord Justice Laws.

== Facts ==
On Saturday, 27 December, shortly after midnight, the claimant, John Donoghue, dived into the sea at Folkestone Harbour, Kent from a slipway. In doing so, he hit his head on a submerged object, rendering him tetraplegic.

He commenced proceedings against Folkestone Properties Limited who owned and occupied the harbour. His original claim was under the Occupiers' Liability Act 1957, seeking compensation for his injuries, for the loss of quality of life and for the cost of future care he would require, as well as loss of potential future earnings.

In the first instance, at the High Court, the claimant succeeded, after conceding that he was a trespasser and so was covered by the Occupiers' Liability Act 1984 as opposed to the 1957 act, though his damages were reduced by 75%, due to his contributory negligence.

The judgment was appealed by the defendants, stating that the trial judge had erred in imposing a duty under the 1984 act.

== Judgment ==
The Occupiers' Liability Act 1957 is concerned with lawful visitors. It was originally the contention of the claimant that he had implicit permission to be on the premises, though he was later forced to concede that the duty, if any, was owed to him under the Occupiers' Liability Act 1984, which is concerned with persons other than visitors, (most commonly trespassers), predominantly because the defendant had no idea the claimant was on their premises, nor did they have any reason to suspect he may be.

The harbour had been historically been used for swimming and diving, and so the claimant contested that the defendant should have offered some kind of protection to people doing so. Unfortunately for the claimant, the court accepted the counter argument from the defendant that they could not reasonably have been expected to be aware of his presence on the premises as all previous events had taken place in the daytime in the summer, as opposed to a December night.

== Effect ==
In this case, it was held that the claimant could not recover any damages (even after the 75% reduction from the preceding case) on the grounds that, while the claimant's injury was due to the state of the defendant's premises:

- The defendant could not reasonably have foreseen the claimant's presence at the harbour
- The public policy grounds that it would be unfair to award damages simply because the claimant has been injured

The latter point underlines one of the key concepts of English law, the fault principle. The principle is that, although the claimant was injured on the defendant's premises due to their dangerous state, they could not be held liable because they were unaware both of the claimant's presence and of the state of the premises. Thus, there was nothing the defendant could reasonably have done to prevent the claimant's injury.

The case had a heavy influence on Tomlinson v Congleton Borough Council which was going through the House of Lords at almost the same time. The two were closely inter-related with obiter dictum from each being applied to the other.

== Other cases ==
- Tomlinson v Congleton Borough Council, a remarkably similar case from the Lords

Considered:

- British Railways Board v Herrington [1972] 1 All ER 749
- Centuryan Security Services v Kelly [2002] All ER (D) 213 (May)

Applied:

- White v St Albans City and District Council (1990) Times, 12 March
- Ratcliff v McConnell [1999] 1 WLR 670

The following cases have applied, or referred to Donoghue:

- Young v Kent County Council [2005] All ER (D) 217 (Mar)
- Keown v Coventry Healthcare NHS Trust [2006] All ER (D) 27 (Feb)

== See also ==
- Occupiers' Liability
- Occupiers' Liability Act 1957
- Occupiers' Liability Act 1984
- House of Lords
- Court of Appeal of England and Wales
- Ratio Decidendi
- Obiter dictum
- Public policy (law)
- Contributory negligence
