= Baker v T E Hopkins & Son Ltd =

Court decision

- Court: Court of Appeal
- Decided: July 24th 1959
- Citations: [1959] [1959] EWCA Civ 4, [1959] 1 WLR 966

Court membership
- Judges sitting: Morris LJ; Ormerod LJ; Willmer LJ

Keywords
- Negligence, Duty to Rescue, Volenti non fit injuria, Contributory negligence, Causation

Baker v. T E Hopkins & Son Ltd [1959] 3 All ER 225 is a Court of Appeal of England and Wales decision dealing with the issue of helpers' liability in tort.

== Facts ==
Two employees of the defendant company were overcome by carbon monoxide fumes in a well they were attempting to decontaminate. The plaintiff, a doctor, went in to try to rescue them even though he was warned of the fumes and told that the fire brigade was on the way. The fumes had been caused by the company negligently placing a motor operated pump at the bottom of the well on some scaffolding in order to assist in the pumping out of the well. All three men died.

== Judgment ==
The defendant company argued that (the estate of) the plaintiff doctor should either not be compensated because the doctor knowingly accepted the risk he was taking or his damages would be reduced for contributory negligence. The Court of Appeal considered that such a suggestion was "ungracious" and that it was unseemly and irrational to say that a rescuer freely takes on the risks inherent in a rescue attempt. The doctor's contributory negligence could only be recognised if he showed "a wholly unreasonable disregard for his own safety".

== Significance ==
This case is one of the many in which the courts have refused to hold rescuers who have suffered in their rescue attempts to have negligently contributed to their injuries nor to have accepted the risks involved in their rescue attempt. This applies to both amateur and professional rescuers, such as fire fighters (See Ogwo v. Taylor [1988] AC 431).

== See also ==
- Causation
- Contributory negligence
- Duty to rescue
- Volenti non fit injuria
