= Doherty v Reynolds and St. James's Hospital Board =

Irish Supreme Court case

Doherty v Reynolds & St. James's Hospital Board
- Coat of arms of Ireland
- Court: Supreme Court of Ireland
- Full case name: Christopher Doherty v. John Reynolds and St. James's Hospital Board
- Decided: 15 July 2004

Case history
- Appealed from: High Court
- Appealed to: Supreme Court

Court membership
- Judges sitting: Ronan Keane C.J., John Murray J., Niall Fennelly J.

Case opinions
- Decision by: Keane, C.J.
- Concurrence: All

Keywords
- Tort, Negligence, Medical malpractice, standard

Doherty v Reynolds and St. James's Hospital Board [2004] IESC 42 was a case of medical negligence in which the Supreme Court of Ireland confirmed that, under the doctrine of res ipsa loquitur, where an injury would not be expected to occur without negligence in the management of something, negligence on the part of those charged with the thing's management may be presumed from the mere fact of injury.

== Background ==
Mr Doherty was from County Galway and prior to the proceedings had been an electrician and married with three children. He had started to complain of gastric discomfort by way of heartburn and acid reflux. He underwent a procedure to have resolved what had been established as "a loose valve at the end of the oesophagus." After surgery, Mr. Doherty awoke and became aware of pain in his right shoulder. He had made inquiries with the nurse as to pain relief, which in his evidence to the court was not effective. He had mentioned to both a doctor and nurse prior to his discharge of his considerable pain. Later attending his own GP regarding the same complaint he was admitted to Beaumont Hospital, which in turn "had raised a query with the surgeon." (in St. James'). One possibility it was contended was that his arm may have motioned off the table, but this was something with which the two neurologists gave conflicting reasons.

When evidence came before the court, the nurses who had been working during the time of the Plaintiff's admission did give evidence on the matter. However, "they were giving evidence seven years after the event" with no particular memory of dealing specifically with Mr Doherty. However, some notes that had been kept that related to the Plaintiff that time, showed nothing relative to complaints of pain or movement in his arm. This seemed to contradict the evidence of the plaintiff, his wife and that of a Father Flanagan who had driven the plaintiff home upon his discharge from the hospital. The Chief Justice was critical of the fact that "the absence of any records of the Plaintiff's complaints of severe pain in his shoulder area to any of the hospital staff was certainly remarkable and reflects, at best from their point of view, a singularly inadequate system of record keeping." In the event, the High Court found that the hospital was liable for Mr Doherty's injuries.

== Law ==
On the application of the doctrine of Res Ipsa Loquitor ('the thing speaks for itself') to the case, the Supreme Court noted in relation "to an injury sustained by a plaintiff in or about the time of carrying out an operation under anaesthetic, the most that the defendants are required to do is show that they exercised all reasonable care, and in particular they are not required to prove on the balance of probabilities what did, in fact, cause the plaintiff's injuries." In relation to the doctrine itself, iterating the issue of reasonable care, the Court made reference to Erie C.J. in the case of Scott v London and St Katherine Docks Company (1865) 159 ER 665. The learned judge stated inter alia: "...where the thing is shown to be under the management of the defendant or his servants, and the accident is such as in the ordinary course of things does not happen if those who have the management use proper care, it affords reasonable evidence, in the absence of explanation by the defendants, that the accident arose from want of care."

== Holding of the Supreme Court ==
The Court was mindful that "the fact that the staff of the hospital cannot, at a particular remove of time, give honest evidence that they recall how a particular patient was dealt with is, of course, a fact to which the court must have regard". In recognizing the work of the surgeon in this instance the court referenced Stuart-Smith L.J. in Delaney v Southmead Health Authority 26 BLMR 111 where he stated: "in the case of a doctor or an anaesthetist who adopts a regular practice, very often that is all he can say unless there is some reason why he should adopt a different process in a particular case...". The Court ruled that the trial judge had erred in assuming that because the hospital staff were unable to recall the specific details of what transpired during the operation itself, they were unable to discharge the burden of proof resting on them of establishing that they had not been negligent. The Court therefore ordered a new trial.
