= Assumption of risk =

Defence in the law of torts

Assumption of risk is a defense, specifically an affirmative defense, in the law of torts, which bars or reduces a plaintiff's right to recovery against a negligent tortfeasor if the defendant can demonstrate that the plaintiff voluntarily and knowingly assumed the risks at issue inherent to the dangerous activity in which the plaintiff was participating at the time of their injury.

== Primary vs. secondary ==
"Primary" assumption of risk occurs when the plaintiff knows about a particular risk and—through words or conduct—accepts that risk, thereby relieving the defendant of its duty of care. The primary assumption of risk defense operates as a complete bar to recovery. For example, someone who goes skiing assumes the risk that they will fall and break a bone and cannot sue a ski resort for such an injury in the absence of additional fault, such as the failure to properly maintain safety equipment.

"Secondary" assumption of risk exists where the defendant has a continuing duty of reasonable care to the plaintiff, but the plaintiff knows about the risk caused by the defendant's negligence and proceeded despite that knowledge. For example, an employer supplies an employee with a defective piece of machinery, and knowing the machinery is defective, the employee proceeds to use it anyway (albeit carefully). If the machinery causes injury, the employer may have a secondary assumption of risk defense. In comparative negligence jurisdictions, secondary assumption of risk is applied as a factor that the jury can consider in apportioning fault, rather than a complete defense.

The California Supreme Court explained the difference between primary and secondary assumption of risk (under California law) as follows:

In cases involving 'primary assumption of risk'—where, by virtue of the nature of the activity and the parties' relationship to the activity, the defendant owes no legal duty to protect the plaintiff from the particular risk of harm that caused the injury—the doctrine continues to operate as a complete bar to the plaintiff's recovery. In cases involving 'secondary assumption of risk'—where the defendant does owe a duty of care to the plaintiff, but the plaintiff proceeds to encounter a known risk imposed by the defendant's breach of duty—the doctrine is merged into the comparative fault scheme, and the trier of fact, in apportioning the loss resulting from the injury, may consider the relative responsibility of the parties.

Some states have abrogated the primary assumption-of-risk defense in certain situations because they have determined that the defendant in that situation should not be absolved of its duty of care, even if the plaintiff assumed the risk (such as by signing a premises liability waiver). States have, for example, passed laws abrogating primary assumption of risk for employers engaged in dangerous activities and for landlords with regard to safety conditions on their properties.

== Express vs. implied ==
Express assumption of risk occurs when the plaintiff explicitly accepts the risk, whether by oral or written agreement. For example, a gym requires its members to sign a liability waiver stating that the gym is not legally responsible for any injuries if the member drops heavy weights on themself. A signed liability waiver, however, is not a blanket exemption from liability for operators of a dangerous activity. The specific risk causing the injury must have been known to, and appreciated by, the plaintiff in order for primary assumption of risk to apply. Courts often refuse to enforce a general liability waiver if it fails to inform the signer of the specific risk that caused the injury. Additionally, even express assumption of risk cannot absolve a defendant of liability for reckless conduct (only negligent conduct).

An exculpatory clause is an express assumption of the risk.

Implied assumption of risk occurs when the plaintiff's conduct demonstrates that the plaintiff knew of the risk and proceeded anyway. If the implied assumption of risk is eligible for the primary assumption-of-risk defense, the defendant has no liability. If the implied assumption does not qualify for primary assumption of risk, the plaintiff's award may be reduced by the amount of fault the fact-finder determines the plaintiff to have by knowing the risk and proceeding anyway. An example of implied assumption of risk is when a spectator goes to a baseball game, the spectator is deemed to accept the risk of being hit by foul balls or home runs.

The implied assumption of risk defense is commonly asserted in cases of injuries occurring during risky recreational activities, such as skiing, paragliding, and scuba diving, but actually extends to all dangerous activities. Thus, for example, it was held that a visitor to the Burning Man festival assumed the risk of getting burned.

== See also ==
- Consent
- Volenti non fit injuria
- In pari delicto
