= Gwilliam v West Hertfordshire Hospital NHS Trust =

English tort law case

- Decided: 24 July 2002
- Citation: [2002] EWCA Civ 1041; [2003] Q.B. 443

Court membership
- Judges sitting: Lord Woolf CJ, Waller and Sedley LJJ

Gwilliam v West Hertfordshire Hospital NHS Trust [2002] EWCA Civ 1041; [2003] QB 443 is an English tort law case concerning occupiers' liability under the Occupiers' Liability Act 1957. It also raises the question of whether the duty of care should encompass a duty to enquire into the insurance status of contractors for dangerous activities.

== Facts ==
Ethel Gwilliam, age 63, went to an NHS organised fun fair, at Mount Vernon Hospital in Northwood, Middlesex, where there was a "splat wall". Waller LJ in his account of the facts described it as follows. "The aim of the apparatus was to allow the participant to bounce from a trampoline and adhere by means of Velcro material to a wall." In other words, you get dressed in a velcro costume, bounce on the trampoline and then go "splat" onto the wall. Unfortunately, Ms Gwilliam was injured, because the splat wall had been set up negligently. The hospital had got the splat wall through an independent contractor called "Club Entertainment" by looking them up in the phone book. It turned out that the contractor's public liability insurance had expired just a few days before the event.

Ms Gwilliam had settled a claim against the contractor for £5000 compensation for her injuries. This figure reflected the fact that the contractor was probably not in a position to pay much more. She then sued the NHS trust for the difference between that sum and the full compensation that she could have got, on the basis that they did not provide a safe environment for her as a visitor, and that they failed properly to enquire into the contractor's insurance status.

== Judgment ==
Lord Woolf MR and Waller LJ both held that under s.2(2) of the Occupiers' Liability Act 1957, the Hospital did owe a duty of care to the claimant (Sedley LJ dissenting as to whether a duty was owed). The question was whether the hospital had discharged this duty, (s2(4)(b) of the '57 Act could not be directly applied on the facts), and it was held that this included establishing that the independent contractor was competent for the context of a fair in the hospital grounds. The nature of the event demanded that the insurance be checked as part of exercising that duty and Mr Wynne for the hospital had indeed asked whether there was insurance at the time of booking (which there was), but unbeknown to the hospital, this insurance lapsed a few days before the fair and it was held that it would have been "an unreasonable requirement" for Mr Wynne to have insisted on checking the policy document. As such, the hospital had discharged its duty and the appeal was dismissed.

== Dissent ==
Sedley LJ concurred in the result of the case (that the Trust was liable) but dissented on the obiter statements concerning insurance. He said that if there was a duty of care, it would be a logical and factual leap to include inquiry into insurance into the duty of care. That would not be fair, just and reasonable.

== See also ==
- Negligence
