= Inter arma enim silent leges =

Latin phrase

Inter arma enim silent leges is a Latin phrase that literally means 'For among arms, the laws are silent' but is more popularly rendered as 'In times of war, the law falls silent'.

== Ancient Rome ==
The aphorism was likely first written in these words by Cicero in chapter 11 of his oration Pro Milone, although his actual wording is Silent enim leges inter arma.

When Cicero used the phrase, politically motivated mob violence was common. Armed gangs led by partisan leaders controlled the streets of Rome, but such leaders were elected to high offices.

Other Latin writers used the expression like St. Jerome in Letter 126.

== United Kingdom ==
After the Anglo-Soviet invasion of Iran in 1941, Winston Churchill invoked Inter arma silent leges in his WW2 memoirs to justify this joint British and Soviet military action "of overwhelming force against a weak and ancient state."

== United States ==
Abraham Lincoln's request for an opinion on the suspension of the right to habeas corpus during the American Civil War eventually resulted in the decision in Ex parte Merryman (1861) of Chief Justice Roger B. Taney, as a judge of the US Circuit Court for the District of Maryland:

1. That the president ... cannot suspend the privilege of the writ of habeas corpus, nor authorize a military officer to do it.
2. That a military officer has no right to arrest and detain a person not subject to the rules and articles of war ... except in aid of the judicial authority, and subject to its control.

The US government explicitly referred to the maxim in its argument in the case by remarking (with an additional reference to Cicero) that "these [amendments of the Bill of Rights], in truth, are all peace provisions of the Constitution and, like all other conventional and legislative laws and enactments, are silent amidst arms, and when the safety of the people becomes the supreme law."

The erosion of citizens' rights during World War II was upheld by the United States Supreme Court in Hirabayashi v. United States (1943), a case that held that the application of curfews against members of a minority group was constitutional when the nation was at war with the country from which that group originated. Yasui v. United States was a companion case that was decided on the same day.

In its more modern usage, the phrase has become a watchword about the erosion of civil liberties during wartime. In the immediate wake of the September 11 attacks, the maxim was aired and questioned in the media of the United States with renewed force. The implication of the saying, as currently used, is in debate whether civil liberties and freedoms are subservient to a wartime nation's duty of self-defense.

In 1998, Chief Justice William Rehnquist, in All the Laws but One: Civil Liberties in Wartime, suggested that "the least justified of the curtailments of civil liberty" were unlikely to be accepted by the courts in future wars: "It is neither desirable nor is it remotely likely that civil liberty will occupy as favored a position in wartime as it does in peacetime. But it is both desirable and likely that more careful attention will be paid by the courts to the basis for the government's claims of necessity as a basis for curtailing civil liberty.... The laws will thus not be silent in time of war, but they will speak with a somewhat different voice."

In 2004, Associate Justice Antonin Scalia used this phrase to decry the plurality decision in Hamdi v. Rumsfeld, which upheld the detention of a US citizen as an enemy combatant without charge or suspension of habeas corpus:

Many think it not only inevitable but entirely proper that liberty give way to security in times of national crisis that, at the extremes of military exigency, inter arma silent leges. Whatever the general merits of the view that war silences law or modulates its voice, that view has no place in the interpretation and application of a Constitution designed precisely to confront war and, in a manner that accords with democratic principles, to accommodate it.

== In fiction ==
The phrase was used as the title for the 1999 episode of the science fiction television series Star Trek: Deep Space Nine, "Inter Arma Enim Silent Leges". In the episode, Admiral William J. Ross uses the phrase to justify a morally dubious act during the Dominion War.

The phrase was used in the 2010 movie The Conspirator by the character Joseph Holt when telling Frederick Aiken why his habeas corpus writ has been overridden by President Andrew Johnson to send Mary Surratt to be hanged.

== See also ==
- State of emergency
