= Roles v Nathan =

Occupiers' liability case in English tort law

Roles v Nathan (t/a Manchester Assembly Rooms) [1963] 1 WLR 1117, [1963] 2 All ER 908 is an occupiers' liability case in English tort law. It concerns §2(3)(b) of the Occupiers' Liability Act 1957, which states:

"An occupier may expect that a person, in the exercise of his calling, will appreciate and guard against special risks ordinarily incident to it, so far as the occupier leaves him free to do so."

The purpose of the Act was to create a single standard of care for the occupier towards all persons, "due to the state of the premises," replacing the multiple, confusing standards.

It also laid down an example of the scope of an occupier's defence when workmen are warned of some danger before they do a job at the occupier's premises. The judges in the Court of Appeal were Lord Denning MR, Harman LJ, and (in dissent) Pearson LJ.

== Facts ==
Two chimney sweeps were sealing up a sweep hole in a flue. Carbon monoxide came through. They had been warned repeatedly and told not to stay in too long, and not to work while a fire was alight. Once already, they had been dragged out for not doing as they were told. They died while working when the fire was burning. The widows sued the occupier. The facts in Lord Denning MR's words follow.

"This case arises out of a tragic accident which took place on Friday, December 12, 1958, when two chimney sweeps were overcome by fumes, and died in the basement of the Manchester Assembly Rooms. Their widows bring the action against the occupier, Mr. Nathan, claiming that he was at fault and in breach of the duty of care which is now laid down by the Occupiers' Liability Act 1957.

It is very unfortunate that this case was tried so long after the accident. The action was not commenced until 2 1/2 years after the accident, and not tried till four years after. In the intervening time the caretaker, a most important witness, had disappeared without trace. So the court, after this length of time, is in great difficulty in ascertaining the facts.

In the assembly rooms there was a central heating boiler in which coke was used as a fuel. The boiler had been manufactured in 1929, and was thus nearly thirty years old. There was an old system of flues to carry away the smoke and fumes. One of these was a horizontal flue 24 ins. in diameter which ran from the boiler for 70 ft (21 m). along under the floor. That led into a vertical flue 18 ins. in diameter which went up a chimney 80 ft (24 m). in height. In the horizontal flue there was an inspection chamber under a slab in the floor. In the vertical flue there was a "sweep-hole" about 12 ins. in diameter and 9 ft (2.7 m). above the ground.

It was sometimes very difficult to get this boiler lighted up. The difficulty was to get a draught going along the flues. When it was first lighted, smoke and fumes got into the atmosphere, which cleared off when the fire got going well. In April 1958 some repairs were carried out, and a firm of builders gave this advice: "If it smokes, light a fire at the foot of the flue to create a draught." In December, 1958, the occupier himself was ill in hospital, and his son-in-law, Mr. Corney, was looking after the assembly rooms for him. On December 9, 1958, the boiler was to be got going for the winter. The fire was lit. There was a lot of smoke. They called in a boiler engineer named Gardner. He said that the flues needed cleaning. So they called in two chimney sweeps to sweep the flues. They were the brothers Donald Roles and Joseph Roles.

Now coke, when burning, gives off carbon monoxide gas, which is very dangerous because it cannot be seen or smelt. It is a stealthy killer. This should be known to everyone who has anything to do with boilers. On the Tuesday, when the sweeps arrived, Gardner warned them of the danger from the fumes, but they took no notice. He described how they acted:

"Donald crawled into the horizontal flue, I told him he should take care and not go in when the thing was just open. Give it a chance to clear out a bit, but he said he knew; he was a flue cleaner for many years, and he knew what he was doing. So we do not interfere with people who know what they are doing."

The fire was let out, and on the Wednesday the sweeps cleaned out the flue. On the Thursday the boiler was lit up again, but still there was trouble with the fumes and the smoke. So they called in an expert, Mr. Collingwood. When Mr. Collingwood got there he saw the fumes and smoke, and he gave another warning; he advised that the fire should be withdrawn at once. He told everyone to get out of the place altogether and get some fresh air. The two flue sweeps were not prepared to accept Mr. Collingwood's advice. He described what took place:

"I ordered everyone out, and they just jumped into the hole, and that was it. I went over to them and warned them against this, and I got foul language."

Mr Collingwood went on to say: "I ordered them out and told them the danger of the gas, and the use of its and they said that they knew a damn sight better; they had been in this business all their life; they did not need my advice."

He said that he repeated his warning two or three times, and added: "They eventually came out, under duress. I had to more or less drag them out."

After Mr. Collingwood had made his inspection, the boiler was lit again. He created a draught by lighting a bit of paper at the bottom of the vertical shaft so as to get it hot. But that was only a temporary expedient. He advised a permanent remedy, either a new flue or an induction fan in the base of the chimney. A new flue would cost a lot of money. So they decided on an induction fan. This could not be provided at once, so they would have to light it up for a time without the fan. Mr. Collingwood then gave another warning, which is crucial in this case. He advised the two sweeps, Mr. Corney and everyone there that the two vent holes (the inspection chamber and the sweep-hole) were to be sealed up before the boiler was lit up. "I repeated this warning," he said,.

"quite a few times to everyone that was there, not only the Roles brothers. That was to everyone in the place of the danger of these gases."

But the attitude of the sweeps, he said, throughout was that they were experts, and they really knew better than Mr. Collingwood himself.

It does appear, however, that Mr. Collingwood did contemplate the possibility that the boiler might be lit before the holes were sealed up. He said that from his own practical experience he thought that he could seal the holes with the fire on. He thought the sweeps could have done it, but said: "It depends entirely how long they were in there. I myself could have gone in there and sealed them off and come back out again, but I certainly would not have stayed in there any length of time." He advised the sweeps, he said, while they were sealing up, not to stay too long in the alcove. So much for the warnings that were given. On Friday, December 12, the fire was lighted. We do not know by whom, but perhaps by the caretaker. The sweeps were working there that day with the fire on. On Friday evening Mr. Corney and Mr. Gardner went there. The sweeps had very nearly completed their work, but they had not finished sealing up the sweep-hole in the vertical shaft. Mr. Corney said: "The job was not complete in as much as the cover over the flue hole was not cemented on." He asked the sweeps about it. They said they had not enough cement to do it. It was too late to complete it then, but they would get the necessary cement the following morning from a builder's yard and complete the job. So Mr. Corney left thinking they would come back the next morning (the Saturday morning) to finish off the job. The judge asked him:

"With the fire still on? (A) I did not think that could have been done with the fire alight. I was under the impression the fire would be out in the morning when they came back to do the job." It turns out that the sweeps must have got their cement that evening, and they must have come back later that night. Maybe the caretaker let them in. They came back and attempted to seal up the sweep-hole with an old dustbin lid and with cement. The fire was on at the time. Whilst they were doing this, they were overcome by fumes and died. Their bodies were found next morning. One body was just in the alcove, and the other a little way out, as though he had been trying to pull his workmate out of the alcove. One of them had on his nose a mask of wadding with a nose clip. And so they died. When the police inspected the boiler between 8 and 9 o'clock in the morning, the fire was found to be brightly burning.

It is quite plain that these men died because they were overcome by fumes of carbon monoxide. It would appear to a layman that the fumes must have come from the sweep-hole, but the judge, on the evidence, thought they probably came from the boiler. But I do not think it matters. The fumes came from the boiler or the sweep-hole or both. The question is whether anyone was at fault."

== Judgment ==
It was held that the warnings were enough for the occupiers to fall within the §2(4)(a) OLA 1957 defence. Moreover, the occupier was under no duty of care, because under §2(3)(b) the risk was incident to the workmen's calling, a danger they could have been expected to guard against. Pearson LJ dissented, but as he made clear this was on the basis of what he saw the evidence of the workers' conduct to be. He thought because the chimney sweeps had not lit the fire, and did not know of it, this danger was beyond their calling, under §2(3)(b) and that for §2(4)(a) the warnings were not enough, because the defendant's agent (i.e. the caretaker) had lit a fire, which produced the deadly fumes, and the warning could not change that. Lord Denning MR's judgment continues below.

The judge found Mr. Corney guilty of negligence because "he failed to take such care as should have ensured that there was no fire lit until the sweep-hole had been sealed up." He said: "Unfortunately Mr. Corney did not tell the caretaker to draw the fire, or at any rate not to stoke it up." On this account he held that Mr. Corney was at fault, and the occupier liable. But, he found the two sweeps guilty of contributory negligence, and halved the damages. The judge said:

"That negligence" -- that is to say, of the chimney sweeps -- "consisted in the knowledge that there was gas about, or probably would be, the way they ignored explicit warnings and showed complete indifference to the danger which was pointed out to them in plain language, and this strange indifference to the fact that the fire was alight, when Mr. Collingwood had said it ought not to be, until the sweep-hole had been sealed."

The occupier now appeals and says that it is not a case of negligence and contributory negligence, but that, on the true application of the Occupiers' Liability Act 1957, the occupier was not liable at all. This is the first time we have had to consider that Act. It has been very beneficial. It has rid us of those two unpleasant characters, the invitee and the licensee, who haunted the courts for years, and it has replaced them by the attractive figure of a visitor, who has so far given no trouble at all. The Act has now been in force six years, and hardly any case has come before the courts in which its interpretation has had to be considered. The draftsman expressed the hope that

"the Act would replace a principle of the common law with a new principle of the common law; instead of having the judgment of Willes J. construed as if it were a statute, one is to have a statute which can be construed as if it were a judgment of Willes J."

It seems that his hopes are being fulfilled. All the fine distinctions about traps have been thrown aside and replaced by the common duty of care. "The common duty of care," the Act says, "is a duty to take such care as in all the circumstances of the case is reasonable to see that the visitor" -- note the visitor, not the premises -- "will be reasonably safe in using the premises for the purposes for which he is invited or permitted by the occupier to be there."

That is comprehensive. All the circumstances have to be considered. But the Act goes on to give examples of the circumstances that are relevant. The particular one in question here is in subsection (3) of section 2:

"The circumstances relevant for the present purpose include the degree of care, and of want of care, which would ordinarily be looked for in such a visitor, so that (for example) in proper cases ... (b) an occupier may expect that a person, in the exercise of his calling, will appreciate and guard against any special risks ordinarily incident to it, so far as the occupier leaves him free to do so."

That subsection shows that General Cleaning Contractors v. Christmas [1953] A.C. 180; [1953] 2 W.L.R. 6; [1952] 2 All E.R. 1110, H.L. is still good law under this new Act. There a window cleaner (who was employed by independent contractors) was sent to clean the windows of a club. One of the windows was defective; it had not been inspected and repaired as it should have been. In consequence, when the window cleaner was cleaning it, it ran down quickly and trapped his hand, thus causing him to fall. It was held that he had no cause of action against the club. If it had been a guest who had his fingers trapped by the defective window, the guest could have recovered damages from the club. But the window cleaner could not do so. The reason is this: the householder is concerned to see that the windows are safe for his guests to open and close, but he is not concerned to see that they are safe for a window cleaner to hold on to. The risk of a defective window is a special risk, but it is ordinarily incident to the calling of a window cleaner, and so he must take care for himself, and not expect the householder to do so.

Likewise in the case of a chimney sweep who comes to sweep the chimneys or to seal up a sweep-hole. The householder can reasonably expect the sweep to take care of himself so far as any dangers from the flues are concerned. These chimney sweeps ought to have known that there might be dangerous fumes about and ought to have taken steps to guard against them. They ought to have known that they should not attempt to seal up a sweep-hole whilst the fire was still alight. They ought to have had the fire withdrawn before they attempted to seal it up, or at any rate they ought not to have stayed in the alcove too long when there might be dangerous fumes about. All this was known to these two sweeps; they were repeatedly warned about it, and it was for them to guard against the danger. It was not for the occupier to do it, even though he was present and heard the warnings. When a householder calls in a specialist to deal with a defective installation on his premises, he can reasonably expect the specialist to appreciate and guard against the dangers arising from the defect. The householder is not bound to watch over him to see that he comes to no harm. I would hold, therefore, that the occupier here was under no duty of care to these sweeps, at any rate in regard to the dangers which caused their deaths. If it had been a different danger, as for instance if the stairs leading to the cellar gave way, the occupier might no doubt be responsible, but not for these dangers which were special risks ordinarily incidental to their calling.

Even if I am wrong about this point, and the occupier was under a duty of care to these chimney sweeps, the question arises whether the duty was discharged by the warning that was given to them. This brings us to subsection (4) which states:

"In determining whether the occupier of premises has discharged the common duty of care to a visitor, regard is to be had to all the circumstances, so that (for example) -- (a) where damage is caused to a visitor by a danger of which he had been warned by the occupier, the warning is not to be treated without more as absolving the occupier from liability, unless in all the circumstances it was enough to enable the visitor to be reasonably safe."

We all know the reason for this subsection. It was inserted so as to clear up the unsatisfactory state of the law as it had been left by the decision of the House of Lords in London Graving Dock Co. v. Horton [1951] A.C. 737; [1951] 1 T.L.R. 949; [1951] 2 All E.R. 1, H.L. That case was commonly supposed to have decided that, when a person comes onto premises as an invitee, and is injured by the defective or dangerous condition of the premises (due to the default of the occupier), it is nevertheless a complete defence for the occupier to prove that the invitee knew of the danger, or had been warned of it. Suppose, for instance, that there was only one way of getting into and out of premises, and it was by a footbridge over a stream which was rotten and dangerous. According to Horton's case, the occupier could escape all liability to any visitor by putting up a notice: "This bridge is dangerous," even though there was no other way by which the visitor could get in or out, and he had no option but to go over the bridge. In such a case, section 2 (4) makes it clear that the occupier would nowadays be liable. But if there were two footbridges, one of which was rotten, and the other safe a hundred yards away, the occupier could still escape liability, even today, by putting up a notice: "Do not use this footbridge. It is dangerous. There is a safe one further upstream." Such a warning is sufficient because it does enable the visitor to be reasonably safe.

I think that the law would probably have developed on these lines in any case; see Greene v. Chelsea Borough Council [1954] 2 Q.B. 127, 139; [1954] 3 W.L.R. 12; [1954] 2 All E.R. 318, C.A. where I ventured to say "knowledge or notice of the danger is only a defence when the plaintiff is free to act upon that knowledge or notice so as to avoid the danger." But the subsection has now made it clear. A warning does not absolve the occupier, unless it is enough to enable the visitor to be reasonably safe.

Apply subsection (4) to this case. I am quite clear that the warnings which were given to the sweeps were enough to enable them to be reasonably safe. The sweeps would have been quite safe if they had heeded these warnings. They should not have come back that evening and attempted to seal up the sweep-hole while the fire was still alight. They ought to have waited till next morning, and then they should have seen that the fire was out before they attempted to seal up the sweep-hole. In any case they should not have stayed too long in the sweep-hole. In short, it was entirely their own fault. The judge held that it was contributory negligence. I would go further and say that under the Act the occupier has, by the warnings, discharged his duty.

I would therefore be in favour of allowing this appeal and entering judgment for the defendants.

After Harman LJ delivered a concurring judgment, Pearson LJ stated he could not agree with his brethren's view of the evidence, and after rehearsing the facts, he said why, in part here:

The risk arose, so to speak, from an event of past history. The boiler had been lit, and the dangerous starting period had elapsed, at a time when the defective installation was rendered still more defective by the hole in the chimney, and the fatal accident shows that carbon monoxide had been left behind in the alcove. The deceased could not adequately guard against that risk. It can only be said that they would have had a better chance if they had postponed the completion of the work until Saturday morning because there would by then have been more time for the lingering pockets of carbon monoxide to disperse. The fire could have been put out on Saturday morning, but there is no evidence that that would in itself have removed the carbon monoxide from the alcove. In my view, therefore, the widows' claims are not defeated by section 2 (3) (b) of the Act.

== Legacy ==
Roles v Nathan continues into the 21st Century to be cited as precedent in textbooks and case books.

== See also ==
- Negligence
