= Harrison v Vincent =

1982 English Court of Appeal judgment

Harrison v Vincent [1982] RTR 8 is an English Court of Appeal judgment dealing with the liability negligence of participants in sporting competitions towards other participants. It is notable in that it extended the test of "reckless disregard" for the other's safety which was earlier applied to establish a breach of duty in cases of injury to spectators to cases where other participants had been injured.

== Facts ==
A sidecar passenger sued the motorcycle rider for injuries sustained during a race when the rider was unable to stop because he missed his gear, and his brakes failed.

== Judgment ==
The defendant had the duty to check the brakes before the race. Unlike his failure to hit the gear during the "flurry and excitement" of the race, the brakes should have been tested in the relative calm of the workshop before the race. For acts done in the excitement of the competition the participant will only be liable to others if she demonstrates reckless disregard for their safety, or acts maliciously. However, the standard applicable to the preparation of equipment for the sport is the normal standard, with exercise of reasonable care and skill.

== See also ==
- Negligence
- English tort law
- Duty of care
- Breach of duty in English law
- Wooldridge v Sumner
