= Tomlinson v Congleton BC =

Court case in England regarding torts

Tomlinson v Congleton Borough Council
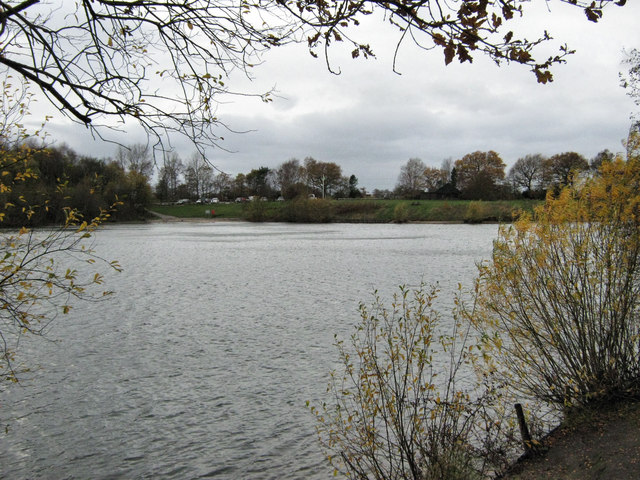
- The claimant jumped head-first into this shallow lake.
- Court: House of Lords
- Full case name: Tomlinson v Congleton Borough Council and others
- Decided: 31 July 2003
- Citations: [2003] UKHL 47; [2004] 1 A.C. 46; [2003] 3 W.L.R. 705; [2003] 3 All E.R. 1122; [2004] P.I.Q.R. P8; [2003] 32 E.G. 68 (C.S.); (2003) 100(34) L.S.G. 33; (2003) 153 N.L.J. 1238; (2003) 147 S.J.L.B. 937; [2003] N.P.C. 102

Court membership
- Judges sitting: Lord Nicholls of Birkenhead; Lord Hoffmann; Lord Hutton; Lord Hobhouse of Woodborough; Lord Scott of Foscote

Keywords
- Trespassers, occupiers liability, standard of care

Tomlinson v Congleton Borough Council [2003] UKHL 47 is a 2003 court case in England from the House of Lords regarding the torts of negligence and occupiers' liability (the latter regarding the Occupiers' Liability Act 1984).

It was a landmark case that has been regarded as an attempt to stem the development of a "compensation culture" in the UK.

== Litigation ==
The case originated in the High Court of Justice, after which it proceeded to the Court of Appeal of England and Wales. In the latter case, the Lords Justice of Appeal held in favour of Tomlinson, the claimant. However, this decision was reversed by the House of Lords.

== Facts ==
In May 1995, the claimant, John Tomlinson (then aged 18), visited an artificial lake, part of a country park in Brereton, Cheshire in the borough of Congleton, with his friends. While there, Tomlinson dived into the water and hit his head on the sandy bottom, leaving him tetraplegic as a result of a break to the fifth vertebra of his neck. He subsequently brought proceedings against Congleton Borough Council under the Occupiers' Liability Act 1984 (as a trespasser), claiming for loss of earnings, loss of quality of life and the cost of the care he would require as a result of his injuries.

== Judgment ==
Tomlinson contended that the council owed him a duty under section 1(1) of the 1984 act as the premises were not reasonably safe for his use, claiming that there had not been adequate warning of the dangers of diving in the water.

However, it was the counter argument of the council that he ceased to become a visitor (1957 act) once he entered the lake as he entered an area (a lake) that was out of bounds to him (see Hillen v ICI (Alkali) Ltd [1936] AC 65, p69). The claimant contended that he was, on the grounds that the council met the conditions of subsection 3 of the 1984 act and that they were aware of the ineffectiveness of the warning signs.

Accordingly, the question became whether or not the claimant was owed a duty under the 1984 act. The council contended that they had taken measures to prevent people from swimming in the lake including warning signs and park ranger patrols. There were still concerns from the council that despite "every reasonable precaution had now been taken, but it was recognised that some foolhardy persons would continue to put their lives at risk."

Following a number of near-death incidents involving attempted-swimming by drunk visitors, the council eventually began to remove the attractive features of the lake to discourage visitors from venturing close to it. It was at this point that Mr Tomlinson decided to dive into the lake. The council argued that they had done everything reasonably possible to ensure the safety of visitors and the lake itself was not the danger, so much as the disregard to warnings and the actions of the public.

This argument was upheld by Lords Nicholls and Hoffmann in the statement:

It seems to me that Mr Tomlinson suffered his injury because he chose to indulge in an activity which had inherent dangers, not because the premises were in a dangerous state.

Eventually, after a lengthy report, the council's argument was accepted and their appeal was allowed on two key grounds:

- The claimant's injuries were not due to the "state of the premises"
- The grounds of public policy (law) holding that, to decide in the claimant's favour would discourage the council from providing facilities for individuals to enjoy themselves

Lord Hobhouse stated on the second point:

The pursuit of an unrestrained culture of blame and compensation has many evil consequences and one is certainly the interference with the liberty of the citizen.

== Reception ==
The ruling was considered landmark as it stated that individuals must take responsibility for their own actions. It was seen as attempting to stem a "compensation culture" that was perceived to be growing in the UK, but which some say are exaggerated and that the law will protect potentially risky but "useful activities"

== See also ==
- Occupiers' liability (English law)
- Occupiers' Liability Act 1957
- Occupiers' Liability Act 1984
- Donoghue v Folkestone Properties Ltd
