= Wheat v E Lacon & Co Ltd =

Wheat v E Lacon & Co Ltd [1966] 1 All ER 582 is a decision of the House of Lords concerning the definition of "occupier" for the purposes of Occupiers' Liability Act 1957. The leading speech in the case was delivered by Lord Denning MR.

== Facts ==
The defendants were a brewery house. The managers of the brewery house, Mr and Mrs Richardson, lived on the premises and occupied a private portion there. Wheat, a paying guest, fell down the stairs of that private part of the premises and died, because there was no handrail on part of the stairs and someone had removed the lightbulb on the stairway. Mr Wheat's estate sued the brewery under the Occupiers' Liability Act 1957.

== Judgment ==
The main legal issue before the Court of Appeal was whether the brewery fell within the scope of the Act as "occupier". Lord Denning defined the "occupier" as a person who has sufficient control over the premises to the extent that he ought to realise that lack of care on his part can cause damage to his lawful visitors. The duty may be shared between several occupiers, who will be jointly and severally liable to the visitors if they both fail to exercise the due care, causing injury. If the property is let, the owner will be considered occupier to all parts of the premises that are not let by demise, such as the common staircase. Where the owner did not let by demise, but merely licensed the property (i.e. allowed another person to live on it), he will be considered occupier of the entire space because he would retain the right and the duty to do repairs. In both cases he will be occupier jointly with the tenant. A contractor doing work on the premises can also be classed as occupier in certain circumstances, whether or not jointly with the owner.

In this particular case, the brewery and Mr and Mrs Richardson (the brewery’s licensees) were all three occupiers. However, they all had different duties of care towards the visitors, depending on how much control they exercised. In this case, the owners were responsible for keeping the handrail safe and the lighting system maintained. However, the handrail could not reasonably be considered dangerous provided there was light and the lack of light was caused by an unknown stranger taking out the light bulb. Consequently, the respondents did not fail in their duty as occupiers towards their visitors and were not liable.

== See also ==
- Occupiers' liability (English Law)

Source: https://www.bailii.org/uk/cases/UKHL/1966/1.html
