= Volenti non fit injuria =

Common law doctrine

Volenti non fit iniuria (or injuria) (Latin: "to a willing person, injury is not done") is a Roman legal maxim and common law doctrine under which a defendant is not liable for damages because a plaintiff voluntarily and knowingly assumed the risk of some activity. It restricts one's ability to bring a claim against another party in tort or delict. Volenti applies only to the risk which a reasonable person would consider them as having assumed by their actions; thus a boxer consents to being hit, and to the injuries that might be expected from being hit, but does not consent to (for example) his opponent striking him with an iron bar, or punching him outside the usual terms of boxing. Volenti is also known as a "voluntary assumption of risk".

Volenti is sometimes described as the plaintiff "consenting to run a risk". In this context, volenti can be distinguished from legal consent in that the latter can prevent some torts arising in the first place. For example, consent to a medical procedure prevents the procedure from being a trespass to the person, or consenting to a person visiting one's land prevents them from being a trespasser.

== History ==
Volenti non fit injuria is an often-quoted form of the legal maxim formulated by the Roman jurist Ulpian which reads in original: Nulla iniuria est, quæ in volentem fiat.

== English law ==
In English tort law, volenti is a full defence, i.e. it fully exonerates the defendant who succeeds in proving it. The defence has two main elements:

- The claimant was fully aware of all the risks involved, including both the nature and the extent of the risk; and
- The claimant expressly (by statement) or implicitly (by actions) consented to waive all claims for damages. Knowledge of the risk is not sufficient: sciens non est volens ("knowing is not volunteering"). Consent must be free and voluntary, i.e. not brought about by duress. If the relationship between the claimant and defendant is such that there is doubt as to whether the consent was truly voluntary, such as the relationship between workers and employers, the courts are unlikely to find volenti.

It is not easy for a defendant to show both elements and therefore comparative negligence usually constitutes a better defence in many cases. Note however that comparative negligence is a partial defence, i.e. it usually leads to a reduction of payable damages rather than a full exclusion of liability. Also, the person consenting to an act may not always be negligent: a bungee jumper may take the greatest possible care not to be injured, and if he is, the defence available to the organiser of the event will be volenti, not comparative negligence.

Consent to medical treatment or consent to risky sports on the part of the claimant excludes liability in tort where that consent is informed consent.

== Other jurisdictions ==
The Scots law of delict similarly recognises the principle and defence of volenti non fit injuria.

US tort law has a similar but more complex legal principle known as assumption of risk. US law recognizes at least two major overlapping dichotomies between different kinds of assumption of risk (primary v. secondary, express v. implied).

In Canada, the "volentio" principles applies in much the same way as under English law. The leading Canadian cases on point are Dube v. Labar and Hall v. Hebert.

== Cases ==
=== Trespassers ===
The Occupiers' Liability Act 1984 (and in Scotland the Occupiers' Liability (Scotland) Act 1960) requires all owners of property to take reasonable steps to make their premises safe for anyone who enters them, even those who enter as trespassers, if they are aware of a risk on the premises. However, the doctrine of volenti has been applied to cases where a trespasser exposed themselves deliberately to risk:

- Titchener v British Railways Board
- Ratcliff v McConnell
- Tomlinson v Congleton Borough Council

In the first case (decided before the Occupier's Liability Act was passed), a girl who had trespassed on the railway was hit by a train. The House of Lords ruled that the fencing around the railway was adequate, and the girl had voluntarily accepted the risk by breaking through it. In the second case, a student who had broken into a closed swimming-pool and injured himself by diving into the shallow end was similarly held responsible for his own injuries. The third case involved a man who dived into a shallow lake, despite the presence of "No Swimming" signs; the signs were held to be an adequate warning.

=== Drunk drivers ===
The defence of volenti is now excluded by statute where a passenger was injured as a result of agreeing to take a lift from a drunk car driver. However, in a well-known case of Morris v Murray, volenti was held to apply to a drunk passenger, who accepted a lift from a drunk pilot. The pilot died in the resulting crash and the passenger who was injured, sued his estate. Although he drove the pilot to the airfield (which was closed at the time) and helped him start the engine and tune the radio, he argued that he did not freely and voluntarily consent to the risk involved in flying. The Court of Appeal held that there was consent: the passenger was not so drunk as to fail to realise the risks of taking a lift from a drunk pilot, and his actions leading up to the flight demonstrated that he voluntarily accepted those risks.

In New Zealand, in the case of Walker v Watson, volenti was held to apply to a situation where a car owner lent his car to someone who he knew was heavily intoxicated. The car ended up crashing into a wall, and the owner sued the driver for damages. The High Court held that the owner had voluntarily lent his car to a person who presented an obvious danger to his property, and therefore the owner was taken to have accepted the risk of damage to his car arising from drunk driving and had impliedly undertaken to bear any losses that arise.

=== Rescuers ===
For reasons of policy, the courts are reluctant to criticise the behaviour of rescuers. A rescuer would not be considered volens if:

1. He was acting to rescue persons or property endangered by the defendant’s negligence;
2. He was acting under a compelling legal, social or moral duty; and
3. His conduct in all circumstances was reasonable and a natural consequence of the defendant’s negligence.

An example of such a case is Haynes v. Harwood, in which a policeman was able to recover damages after being injured restraining a bolting horse: he had a legal and moral duty to protect life and property and as such was not held to have been acting as a volunteer or giving willing consent to the action - it was his contractual obligation as an employee and police officer and moral necessity as a human being to do so, and not a wish to volunteer, which caused him to act. In this case the court of appeal affirmed a judgement in favor of a policeman who had been injured in stopping some runaway horses with a van in a crowded street. The policeman who was on duty, not in the street, but in a police station, darted out and was crushed by one of the horses which fell upon him while he was stopping it. It was also held that the rescuer's act need not be instinctive in order to be reasonable, for one who deliberately encounters peril after reflection may often be acting more reasonably than one who acts upon impulse.

By contrast, in Cutler v. United Dairies a man who was injured trying to restrain a horse was held to be volens because in that case no human life was in immediate danger and he was not under any compelling duty to act.

Also, although to be a "neighbour" within Lord Atkin's dictum, a claimant must be "so closely and directly affected by one's act that one ought reasonably to have them in contemplation", rescuers are invariably deemed to be neighbours, even if their presence would objectively seem to be somewhat unlikely - Baker v Hopkins.

=== Unsuccessful attempts to rely on volenti ===
Examples of cases where a reliance on volenti was unsuccessful include:

- Nettleship v. Weston
- Baker v T E Hopkins & Son Ltd

In the first case, the plaintiff was an instructor who was injured while teaching the defendant to drive. The defence of volenti failed: that is, because the plaintiff specifically inquired if the defendant's insurance covered him before agreeing to teach. In the second case, a doctor went in to try to rescue workmen who were caught in a well after having succumbed to noxious fumes. He did so despite being warned of the danger and told to wait until the fire brigade arrived. The doctor and the workmen all died. The court held that it would be "unseemly" to hold the doctor to have consented to the risk simply because he acted promptly and bravely in an attempt to save lives.

Generally courts are reluctant to recognise voluntary assumption of risk. An example of a court reluctant to find a voluntary assumption of risk includes Carey v Lake Macquarie City Council. Instead the conduct amounted to contributory negligence, which is not a complete defence.

== See also ==
- Acts of the claimant
- Assumption of risk
- Consent
- Ex turpi causa non oritur actio
- List of Latin phrases
- Sciens
- Volens
