= Benjamin Ormerod =

Sir Benjamin Ormerod (7 September 1890 – 21 September 1974) was a lawyer and Judge in England and Wales.

Ormerod was appointed a Justice of the Probate, Divorce and Admiralty Division of the High Court of England and Wales on 25 May 1948. He was knighted a few days later. Ormerod was transferred to the Queen's Bench Division (known as the King's Bench Division until 1952) on 6 June 1950. He was promoted to be a Lord Justice of Appeal in the Court of Appeal of England and Wales on 21 January 1957. Following that appointment, Ormerod was made a member of the Privy Council of the United Kingdom. He retired from his judicial office on 30 September 1963.

== Personal life ==
Sir Bernjamin Ormerod was born in Blackburn, Lancashire, served in Gallipoli and the Western Front. He married Kathleen May Carter in 1916 and had 2 daughters and a son, John Walter Holland Ormerod who was a playwright, poet and author.

== Arms ==
Coat of arms of Benjamin Ormerod
Motto Gradus Alter In Altum
