= Byrne v Boadle =

English legal case

Byrne v Boadle (2 Hurl. & Colt. 722, 159 Eng. Rep. 299, 1863) is an English tort law case that first applied the doctrine of res ipsa loquitur (“the thing speaks for itself”).

== Facts ==
A barrel of flour fell from a second-story loft and hit the plaintiff on his shoulder. Though there were two witnesses who saw the injury, there were no witnesses as to how the barrel fell out and hit the plaintiff. Under these conditions, the plaintiff was not required to provide direct evidence as to whether the person responsible for the barrel had breached his duty of care.

== Judgment ==
Initially, in the lower court the case was dismissed through a directed verdict because the plaintiff could provide no evidence. Subsequently the appellate court concluded that under the conditions, the fact of the accident itself provided sufficient circumstantial evidence to establish the breach of a duty of care. Baron Pollock said the following.

I think it would be wrong to lay down as a rule that in no case can a presumption of negligence arise from the fact of an accident. Suppose in this case the barrel had rolled out of the warehouse and fallen on the plaintiff how could he possibly ascertain from what cause it occurred? It is the duty of persons who keep barrels in a warehouse to take care that they do not roll out, and I think that such a case would, beyond all doubt, afford prima facie evidence of negligence. A barrel could not roll out of a warehouse without some negligence, and to say that a plaintiff who is injured by it must call witnesses from the warehouse to prove negligence seems to me preposterous. The present case upon the evidence comes to this, a man is passing in front of the premises of a dealer in flour, and there falls down upon him a barrel of flour. I think it apparent that the barrel was in the custody of the defendant who occupied the premises, and who is responsible for the acts of his servants who had the control of it; and in my opinion the fact of its falling is prima facie evidence of negligence, and the plaintiff who was injured by it is not bound to show that it could not fall without negligence, but if there are any facts inconsistent with negligence it is for the defendant to prove them.
