= Sciens =

In law, sciens, the Latin word for "knowingly", describes a state of mind. It refers to knowledge of a fact, usually of a specific risk. It is usually pleaded by way of defence. For example, where a claimant suffers a personal injury, the respondent to the claim may aver that the claimant was aware of the risk when they undertook their course of conduct. Clauses in contracts which require participants in dangerous sports to acknowledge certain risks in the sport are usually drafted to set up a potential sciens defence.

== Extent of the defence ==
In most countries, the defence is a limited one, and is ordinarily only effective (if at all) where the claimant, despite being sciens, still undertakes the risk. The common law says that "volenti non fit injuria" ("free will does not make an injury"). In such instances, the claimant is said to be volens (voluntarily assuming the risk), and merely being sciens alone is normally insufficient. For example, if the claimant had to exit a grocery store, and there was a sign warning of a wet floor by the exit, it is not usually a defence to say that the claimant knew of the risk of the wet floor, if the claimant had no other way to leave the store, and thus had to walk across the slippery surface in any event.
