= Occupiers' Liability Act 1984 =

Act of the Parliament of the United Kingdom

Occupiers' Liability Act 1984 (Note: Section 4(1).)
- Act of Parliament
- Parliament of the United Kingdom
- Long title: An Act to amend the law of England and Wales as to the liability of persons as occupiers of premises for injury suffered by persons other than their visitors; and to amend the Unfair Contract Terms Act 1977, as it applies to England and Wales, in relation to persons obtaining access to premises for recreational or educational purposes
- Citation: 1984 c. 3
- Introduced by: Lord Hailsham (Lords)
- Territorial extent: England and Wales (Note: Section 4(3).)

Dates
- Royal assent: 13 March 1984
- Commencement: 13 May 1984 (Note: Section 4(2).)

Other legislation
- Amends: Unfair Contract Terms Act 1977
- Amended by: Countryside and Rights of Way Act 2000; Marine and Coastal Access Act 2009
- Relates to: Occupiers' Liability Act 1957

Status: Amended

Text of statute as originally enacted

Revised text of statute as amended

Text of the Occupiers' Liability Act 1984 as in force today (including any amendments) within the United Kingdom, from legislation.gov.uk.

The Occupiers' Liability Act 1984 (c. 3) is an act of the Parliament of the United Kingdom that covers occupiers' liability for trespassers. In British Railways Board v Herrington [1972] AC 877, the House of Lords had decided that occupiers owed a duty to trespassers, but the exact application of the decision was unclear. The matter was then referred to the Law Commission for a report, and as a result the Occupiers' Liability Bill was introduced to Parliament by Lord Hailsham on 23 June 1983. The act was given royal assent on 13 March 1984 as the Occupiers' Liability Act 1984 and came into force on 13 May.

The act extends the common duty of care to trespassers as well as visitors, providing that this duty is to be required when the occupier has actual or constructive knowledge that a danger exists and that a trespasser is or may be near it. Unlike the Occupiers' Liability Act 1957, the 1984 act only allows an injured trespasser to claim for death and personal injury, not for damage to personal property. The act also makes amendments to the Unfair Contract Terms Act 1977, with the stated intent of allowing additional educational and recreational use of land.

== Background ==
Originally, a trespasser on property had to prove that he was intentionally or recklessly injured, as in Addie v Dumbreck [1929] AC 358. This was seen as unfair, particularly in cases where the trespasser was a child or had only accidentally trespassed. In British Railways Board v Herrington [1972] AC 877, the House of Lords decided that a land owner could owe a duty to trespassers on his land, that duty being to avoid negligently injuring them. The application of this judgment was not certain (for example, whether or not actual knowledge of a trespasser was needed to create a duty), and it was referred to the Law Commission by the Lord Chancellor, Lord Hailsham. In 1976, the commission recommended the introduction of legislation that created a new duty of care to be owed to "uninvited visitors", something endorsed by the Pearson Commission.

After accepting the recommendations, Lord Hailsham introduced the Occupiers' Liability Bill to the House of Lords on 23 June 1983. The bill was given royal assent on 13 March 1984, and came into law as the Occupiers' Liability Act 1984.

== Act ==
=== Duty of care ===
Section 1 establishes the duty of care, which is owed to "persons other than [the occupier's] visitors", who will predominantly be trespassers but this also applies to anyone exercising rights under various statutes dealing with access to the countryside and anyone accessing a private right of way, but does not apply to anyone using a public right of way in which case the common law rules apply. Under Section 1(3) of the Act, the duty is owed when the occupier is aware of the danger, or has reasonable grounds to believe it exist, knows or has reasonable grounds to believe that the trespasser is near or may come to be near the danger and the risk is one which an occupier may reasonably be expected to protect visitors from. This clause was first considered by the courts in White v The Council of the City and District of St. Albans [1990], where the claimant had taken a shortcut across the defendant's fenced-off land and fell into a trench. He argued that the defendant taking precautions to stop people getting into the dangerous area meant that he believed somebody was likely to do so, and was therefore liable. The Court of Appeal rejected this argument, saying that just because a defendant had tried to prevent people entering dangerous land did not mean that the "reasonable grounds to believe" have been satisfied. Under Section 1(2), the duty is owed when the occupier is the occupier of any fixed or moveable structure, including ships and aircraft; the same as in the 1957 Act.

Section 1(4) establishes the duty, which is the same as the "common duty of care" laid out in the Occupiers' Liability Act 1957; that the occupier "take such care as is reasonable in all the circumstances of the case to see that the non-visitor does not suffer injury on the premises by reason of the danger concerned". If the duty of care is breached and the trespasser suffers injury, unlike the Occupiers' Liability Act 1957, the 1984 Act only allows an injured trespasser to claim for death or personal injury, rather than damage to any personal property. The duty of care does not apply to those using a highway, thus preserving the criticised common law rule established in Greenhalgh v British Railways Board [1969] 2 QB 286.

=== Acceptance of risks ===
The trespasser's acceptance of a risk, known as the defence of volenti non fit injuria, is covered in Section 1(6) of the Act, which provides that "no duty is owed ... to any person in respect of risks willingly accepted as his by that person". In Ratcliff v McConnell [1999] the plaintiff, who had been drinking (but was not drunk) jumped into a swimming pool marked with warning signs, suffering serious injuries after hitting the bottom. The Court of Appeal held that, because of the circumstances (jumping into an obviously shallow pool with warning signs during the winter), the plaintiff should have known of the risk and, by acting, had accepted the risk. The Law Commission had initially recommended that the Act contain provisions making it clear that a trespasser's awareness or acceptance of a warning sign was not conclusive evidence of acceptance of the risk, but this was not included.

=== Warnings ===
Section 1(5) of the Act covers warnings. It states that the occupier discharges his duty "by taking such steps as are reasonable in all the circumstances of the case to give warning of the danger concerned or to discourage persons from incurring the risk". However, simply providing a warning sign is not enough; the sign must be clear enough to ensure that the risk is obvious to the trespasser. Whether or not the warning sign makes the risks obvious is dependent on the trespasser; warning notices are often considered inadequate for children, who may be either unable to read or unable to appreciate the danger.

=== Exclusion of liability ===
The 1984 Act includes no statements in regards to whether duty can be excluded by the occupier. This is sometimes suggested to mean that it is possible, since there are no provisions forbidding it. This is taken to weaken the Act if true; since the Unfair Contract Terms Act 1977 is stated not to apply to the 1984 Act, only the common law rules and the 1957 Act, it would allow an occupier to completely exclude liability if true. A second view is that the duty of care cannot be excluded, since the stated aim of the Act was to uphold the common law principle of "duty of common humanity", which was unexcludeable because it was a minimum standard. The case of Baddeley v Earl Granville [1887] 19 QBD 423 implies that a statutory duty cannot be excluded, but there is no case law directly relating to the Act.

=== Unfair Contract Terms Act 1977 ===
The Unfair Contract Terms Act 1977 originally only allowed an occupier to exclude the common duty of care if the property is used for business purposes. Several organisations, including the National Farmers Union and the Country Land and Business Association, argued that this was forcing landowners to exclude people completely for fear of being sued, thus hindering educational and recreational purposes as well as business ones. In response to this, Section 2 of the Act amends the 1977 Act to say that "breach of an obligation or duty towards a person obtaining access to the premises for recreational or educational purposes ... is not a business liability of the occupier unless granting that person such access for the purposes concerned falls within the business purposes of the occupier". This permits landowners to allow educational and recreational bodies access to their land without the risk of liability.

== See also ==
- Occupiers' Liability Act 1957
- Occupiers' liability in English law

== Bibliography ==
- Bermingham, Vera; Carol Brennan (2008). Tort Law. Oxford University Press. ISBN 978-0-19-922798-3.
- Elliott, Catherine; Francis Quinn (2007). Tort Law (6th ed.). Pearson Longman. ISBN 978-1-4058-4672-1.
- Jones, Michael (1984). "The Occupiers' Liability Act 1984". Modern Law Review. 47 (6). Blackwell Publishing.
- Mullis, Alastair (1991). "Duties to trespassers under the Occupiers' Liability Act 1984". Conveyancer and Property Lawyer (January 1991). Sweet & Maxwell. ISSN 0010-8200.
