= Occupiers' Liability Act 1957 =

Act of the Parliament of the United Kingdom

Occupiers' Liability Act 1957 (Note: Section 8(1).)
- Act of Parliament
- Parliament of the United Kingdom
- Long title: An Act to amend the law of England and Wales as to the liability of occupiers and others for injury or damage resulting to persons or goods lawfully on any land or other property from dangers due to the state of the property or to things done or omitted to be done there, to make provision as to the operation in relation to the Crown of laws made by the Parliament of Northern Ireland for similar purposes or otherwise amending the law of tort, and for purposes connected therewith.
- Citation: 5 & 6 Eliz. 2. c. 31
- Territorial extent: England and Wales (Note: Section 8(2).)

Dates
- Royal assent: 6 June 1957
- Commencement: 1 January 1958 (Note: Section 8(3).)
Other legislation
Amended by	Defective Premises Act 1972; Countryside and Rights of Way Act 2000
Relates to	Occupiers' Liability Act (Northern Ireland) 1957; Occupiers' Liability (Scotland) Act 1960

Status: Amended

Text of statute as originally enacted

Revised text of statute as amended

Text of the Occupiers' Liability Act 1957 as in force today (including any amendments) within the United Kingdom, from legislation.gov.uk.

The Occupiers' Liability Act 1957 (5 & 6 Eliz. 2. c. 31) is an act of the Parliament of the United Kingdom that covers occupiers' liability. The result of the Third Report of the Law Reform Committee, the act was introduced to Parliament as the Occupiers' Liability Bill and granted royal assent on 6 June 1957, coming into force on 1 January 1958.

The act unified several classes of visitors to property and the duty of care owed to them by the occupier, as well as codifying elements of the common law relating to this duty of care. It also covered the duty owed to parties to a contract entering the property and ways of excluding the liability for visitors. The act introduced an element of liability for landlords who failed to maintain their properties and were as a result responsible for the injury of a non-tenant, something counter to the previous common law rule in English law. The act is still valid law, and forms much of the law relating to occupiers' liability in English law along with the Occupiers' Liability Act 1984.

== Background ==
Prior to 1957, visitors to a property were classified in different ways, and this classification determined the duty of care an owner or tenant had to them. These were "contractors" such as hotel guests (the highest level of duty: a duty to ensure that the premises were fit for the purposes of the contract), "invitees", such as a customer in a shop (owed a less onerous duty: a duty to take reasonable care to prevent damage from an unusual danger), "licensees", such as a friend invited to a party (a less onerous duty again: a duty to warn of any concealed danger or trap of which the occupier knew) and "uninvited persons" such as trespassers (who were owed no duty of care, except to refrain from deliberately or recklessly causing them harm).

The Third Report of the Law Reform Committee recommended changing this system, and the Occupiers' Liability Bill was given its second reading on 6 March 1957 by Sir Harry Hylton-Foster, the Solicitor General, and royal assent on 6 June 1957.

== Act ==
The Act first identifies the occupier. Section 1(2) identifies the occupier as the person occupying or in control of the premises, not necessarily the owner, with the underlying premise being that the person liable should be the person most likely to have been able to prevent the harm; the person occupying the premises, not necessarily the owner of those premises. The Act does not define occupier, but provides that the person to be treated as the occupier is the person who would be considered an occupier under common law rules. In Wheat v E Lacon & Co Ltd [1966] 1 All ER 582 it was established that more than one person can be an occupier. In Harris v Birkenhead Corporation [1976] it was held that it was possible to be an occupier without having physical possession of the house if the "occupier" has legal control of the property. Section 1(3) extends the standards set by the Act not only to land but to any fixed or movable structure, which includes ships and aircraft.

=== Common duty of care ===
The Act next establishes a uniform duty towards all lawful visitors, thus abolishing the distinction between contractors, invitees and licensees. Section 2 provides that the occupier has a "common duty of care" to all lawful visitors, although it keeps the low duty of care towards unlawful visitors such as trespassers. The new duty is defined as "a duty to take such care as in all the circumstances of the case is reasonable to see that the visitor will be reasonably safe in using the premises for the purposes for which he is invited or permitted by the occupier to be there". The Act allows the occupier to set limits on where the visitor is allowed to go or how long they are allowed to be there, an extension of the common law judgment made by Scrutton LJ in The Calgarth [1927], when he said that "when you invite a person into your house to use the staircase, you do not invite him to slide down the bannisters, you invite him to use the staircase in the ordinary way in which it is used".

==== Exceptions ====
Exceptions are made for children and a person "in the exercise of his calling" (a professional person or somebody exercising a trade or skill). With children, occupiers must "be prepared for children to be less careful than adults"; a warning notice, for example, would normally be good enough to alert adults to a potential danger, but not to alert children. This is another extension of a common law principle; in Glasgow Corporation v Taylor [1922] 1 AC 44, a seven-year-old child died after eating poisonous berries from a bush in a park. The berries, which looked like cherries or blackcurrants, were found by the House of Lords to constitute an "allurement" to the child, who found Glasgow Corporation, which owned the park, liable. However, the situation is different if the child has a guardian with him, who one would expect to appreciate any obvious dangers, as in Phipps v Rochester Corporation [1955] 1 QB 450. This was essentially the same as the existing common law; indeed, "It is doubtful whether the Act alters the law at all on this point".

An occupier has a less onerous duty towards a person "in the exercise of his calling", such as a professional or somebody exercising a trade. Section 2(3)(b) of the Act provides that such a person "will appreciate and guard against any special risks ordinarily incidental to [his calling], so far as the occupier leaves him free to do so". In Roles v Nathan 2 All ER 908 a pair of chimney sweeps were called to clean the flues of a boiler. The engineer warned them about the risk of carbon monoxide poisoning if the chimney sweeps cleaned the flues with the fires still lit, but they disregarded his warning and continued until they were overwhelmed by carbon monoxide and died. The Court of Appeal held that the occupier was not liable, because the chimney sweeps had been warned and a householder who calls in a specialist to deal with defective property can reasonably expect the specialist to guard against any obvious dangers.

==== Warnings ====
A warning of danger is to be taken into account when working out if the common duty of care has been breached. Section 2(4)a says that "where damage is caused to a visitor by a danger of which he had been warned by the occupier, the warning is not to be treated without more as absolving the occupier from liability, unless in all the circumstances it was enough to enable the visitor to be reasonably safe". Warning may discharge the common duty of care, as in Roles v Nathan, but is generally not enough unless it lets the visitor be reasonably safe. In Rae v Mars (UK) Ltd [1990] it was held that where danger is extreme or unusual, it not enough for there to be a warning; a barrier or additional notice should be placed. Staples v West Dorset District Council [1995] established that where a danger is obvious and the visitor is able to appreciate it, there is no need for a warning sign.

==== Independent contractors ====
Section 2(4)(b) establishes that "where damage is caused to a visitor by a danger due to the faulty execution of any work of construction, maintenance or repair by an independent contractor employed by the occupier, the occupier is not to be treated without more as answerable for the danger if in all the circumstances he had acted reasonably in entrusting the work to an independent contractor and had taken such steps (if any) as he reasonably ought in order to satisfy himself that the contractor was competent and that the work had been properly done". This accords with the previous general rule that an occupier cannot be held vicariously liable for the negligence of an independent contractor. When a visitor does suffer harm from the work of an independent contractor, the question is instead whether the occupier has taken reasonable steps to establish if the contractor is competent, and, if the job permits, whether the occupier has checked that the work has been properly done.

The application of this rule differs depending on the technical nature of the job and the competencies on the occupier. Haseldine v CA Daw & Son Ltd [1941] established that the more technical a job is, the more reasonable it is to entrust it to an independent contractor, while in Woodward v The Mayor of Hastings [1945] the court held that an occupier is not always absolved from liability if they have entrusted the job to a competent person; an occupier is required to take the kind of care that a reasonable man in his place would take.

If an occupier allows an extremely dangerous activity to take place on his land without taking precautions to ensure the contractor has liability insurance and a safety plan, he may be held liable. In Bottomley v Todmorden Cricket Club [2003] the Court of Appeal held that, where the defendant had allowed an independent contractor to set up a pyrotechnic display on their land without checking for public liability insurance, they were liable for the injuries suffered by the claimant. The extent to which one has to check for public liability insurance is weak; in Gwilliam v West Hertfordshire Hospital NHS Trust [2002] the Court of Appeal held that where the contractor's insurance had expired a few days before the event, the occupier was not liable. In Naylor v Payling the occupier was not liable for failing to check public liability, since he had checked the contractor was accredited under the police and local government schemes required, and the contractor had been employed for 18 months before the case during which there were no reasons to doubt his competency. The Court of Appeal also held that, except in special circumstances, there was no "free-standing duty" to take reasonable steps to ensure an independent contractor was insured.

=== Excluding liability ===
Section 2(5) of the Act provides that there is no liability for "risks willingly accepted as his by the visitor", an application of volenti non fit injuria. An occupier can also restrict or exclude liability via a notice providing warnings and conditions of entry, although under section 65 of the Consumer Rights Act 2015 (CRA) this cannot exclude liability for death or personal injury due to negligence where the premises are occupied for the business purposes of the occupier. Before CRA it was treated differently; in Ashdown v Samuel Williams & Sons Ltd [1957] 1 QB 409 the Court of Appeal held that an occupier could exclude liability by displaying a notice disclaiming as such, even if the claimant had not read the notice. This provision of the Act has been heavily criticised by commentators.

=== Second and third parties to a contract entering the property ===
Section 3 of the Act provides that, where the occupier is bound by contract to allow third parties into his property, "the [common] duty of care which he owes to them as his visitors cannot be restricted or excluded by that contract, but (subject to any provision of the contract to the contrary) shall include the duty to perform his obligations under the contract, whether undertaken for their protection or not, in so far as those obligations go beyond the obligations otherwise involved in that [common] duty". Existing common law rules imply, however, that while he could not exclude liability based on the contract, he could exclude liability with a sign disclaiming such, as with other visitors to the property.

Section 5 extends the common duty of care to those people entering, using, bringing or sending goods to the property under the terms of a contract.

=== Landlord's liability ===
Section 4 was repealed by Section 6(4) of the Defective Premises Act 1972. It had created a liability of landlords to visitors injured by breach of a landlord’s obligation to repair and maintain the property. Under common law, the landlord was not liable; the 1957 Act changed this. Section 4(1) provided that, when a tenant was occupying the premises in such a way as to impose an obligation on the landlord to maintain the property, the same duty that the landlord owed to the tenant was extended to anybody whose goods might be on the property "from time to time". Where premises were occupied under a sub-tenancy agreement, the same obligation extended to the tenant leasing the property.

== Subsequent developments ==
The act remains in force. Section 1(4), which provided that a person entering premises under an access agreement or order made under the National Parks and Access to the Countryside Act 1949 (12, 13 & 14 Geo. 6. c. 97) was not a visitor of the occupier, was replaced by a new subsection (4). The new subsection also covers a person entering in exercise of rights conferred by section 2(1) of the Countryside and Rights of Way Act 2000 (c. 37). The substitution was made by section 13(1) of that act, which came into force on 19 September 2004 for England under the Countryside and Rights of Way Act 2000 (Commencement No. 5) Order 2004 (SI 2004/2173), and on 28 May 2005 for Wales under the Countryside and Rights of Way Act 2000 (Commencement No. 6) (Wales) Order 2005 (SI 2005/423).

Section 4 was repealed by section 6(4) of the Defective Premises Act 1972 (c. 35), which came into force on 1 January 1974.

== See also ==
- Occupiers' liability in English law
- Occupiers' Liability Act 1984
- Roles v Nathan

== Bibliography ==
- Bermingham, Vera; Carol Brennan (2008). Tort Law. Oxford University Press. ISBN 978-0-19-922798-3.
- Payne, Douglas (1958). "The Occupiers' Liability Act". Modern Law Review. 21 (4). Blackwell Publishing: 359–374. doi:10.1111/j.1468-2230.1958.tb00481.x.
