= Res ipsa loquitur =

Legal term - Latin for "the thing speaks for itself"

Res ipsa loquitur (Latin: "the thing speaks for itself") is a doctrine in common law and Roman-Dutch law jurisdictions under which a court can infer negligence from the very nature of an accident or injury in the absence of direct evidence on how any defendant behaved in the context of tort litigation.

The crux of res ipsa loquitur is circumstantial inference. Although specific criteria differ by jurisdiction, an action typically must satisfy the following elements of negligence: the existence of a duty of care, breach of appropriate standard of care, causation, and injury. In res ipsa loquitur, the existence of the first three elements is inferred from the existence of injury that does not ordinarily occur without negligence.

== Latin note ==
Res ipsa loquitur is a phrase using a deponent verb, that is, a verb that is passive in appearance but active in effect.

== History ==
The term comes from Latin and is literally translated "the thing itself speaks", but the sense is well conveyed in the more common translation, "the thing speaks for itself". The earliest known use of the phrase was by Cicero in his defense speech Pro Milone. The circumstances of the genesis of the phrase and application by Cicero in Roman legal trials has led to questions whether it reflects on the quality of res ipsa loquitur as a legal doctrine subsequent to 52 BC, some 1915 years before the English case Byrne v Boadle and the question whether Charles Edward Pollock might have taken direct inspiration from Cicero's application of the maxim in writing his judgment in that case.

== Elements ==
1. The injury is of the kind that does not ordinarily occur without negligence or is uncommon in the course and nature of said act.
2. The injury is caused by an agency or instrumentality within the exclusive control of the defendant.
3. The injury-causing accident is not by any voluntary action or contribution on the part of the plaintiff.
4. The defendant's non-negligent explanation does not completely explain plaintiff's injury.

The first element may be satisfied in one of three ways:

1. The injury itself is sufficient to prove blatant or palpable negligence as a matter of law, such as amputation of the wrong limb or leaving instruments inside the body after surgery.
2. The general experience and observation of mankind is sufficient to support the conclusion that the injury would not have resulted without negligence, such as a hysterectomy (removal of the uterus) performed when the patient consented only to a tubal ligation (clipping of the fallopian tubes for purposes of sterilization).
3. Expert testimony creates an inference that negligence caused the injury, such as an expert general surgeon testifying that he has performed over 1000 appendectomies (removal of the appendix) and has never caused injury to a patient's liver. He also does not know of any of his surgeon colleagues having inflicted injury to a patient's liver during an appendectomy. The testimony would create an inference that injuring the liver in the course of an appendectomy is negligence.

The second element is discussed further in the section below. The third element requires the absence of contributory negligence from the plaintiff. The fourth element emphasizes that defendant may defeat a res ipsa loquitur claim by producing evidence of a non-negligent scenario that would completely explain plaintiff's injury and negate all possible inferences that negligence could have occurred.

== Exclusive control requirement ==
The common law traditionally required that "the instrumentality or agent which caused the accident was under the exclusive control of the defendant". See e.g., Eaton v. Eaton, 575 A2d 858 (NJ 1990). However, in the United States, the second and the third versions of the Restatement of Torts eliminated the strict requirement because it can be difficult to prove "exclusive control". Accordingly, the element has largely given way in modern American cases to a less rigid formulation: the evidence must eliminate, to a sufficient degree, other responsible causes (including the conduct of the plaintiff and third parties). For example, in New York State, the defendant's exclusivity of control must be such that the likelihood of injury was more likely than not, the result of the defendant's negligence. The likelihood of other possibilities does not need to be eliminated altogether but must be so reduced that the greater probability lies with the defendant.

Here is a fictitious example:

- John Doe is injured when an elevator he has entered plunges several floors and stops abruptly.
- Jane's Corporation built and is responsible for maintaining the elevator.
- John sues Jane. Jane claims that his complaint should be dismissed because he has never proved or even offered a theory as to why the elevator functioned incorrectly. Therefore, she argues that there is no evidence that they were at fault.
- The court holds that John does not have to prove anything beyond the fall itself.
  - The elevator evidently malfunctioned (it was not intended to fall, and that is not a proper function of a correctly functioning elevator).
  - Jane was responsible for the elevator in every respect.
  - Therefore, Jane's Corporation is responsible for the fall.
- The thing speaks for itself: no further explanation is needed to establish the prima facie case.

In some cases, a closed group of people may be held in breach of a duty of care under the rule of res ipsa loquitur. In Ybarra v. Spangard, a patient undergoing surgery experienced back complications as a result of the surgery, but it could not be determined the specific member of the surgical team who had breached the duty so it was held that they had all breached, as it was certain that at least one of them was the only person who was in exclusive control of the instrumentality of harm.

In jurisdictions that employ this less rigid formulation of exclusive control, the element subsumes the element that the plaintiff did not contribute to his injury. In modern case law, contributory negligence is compared to the injury caused by the other. For example, if the negligence of the other is 95% of the cause of the plaintiff's injury, and the plaintiff is 5% responsible, the plaintiff's slight fault cannot negate the negligence of the other. The new type of split liability is commonly called comparative negligence.

== Typical in medical malpractice ==
Res ipsa loquitur often arises in the "scalpel left behind" variety of case. For example, a person goes to a doctor with abdominal pains after having his appendix removed. X-rays show the patient has a metal object the size and shape of a scalpel in his abdomen. It requires no further explanation to show the surgeon who removed the appendix was negligent, as there is no legitimate reason for a doctor to leave a scalpel in a body at the end of an appendectomy.

== Examples by jurisdictions ==
=== Canada ===
In Canada the doctrine of res ipsa loquitur has been largely overturned by the Supreme Court. In case of Fontaine v. British Columbia (Official Administrator) the Court rejected the use of res ipsa loquitur and instead proposed the rule that once the plaintiff has proven that the harm was under exclusive control of the defendant and that they were not contributorily negligent a tactical burden is placed on the defendant in which the judge has the discretion to infer negligence unless the defendant can produce evidence to the contrary.

=== Hong Kong ===
Hong Kong is one of the common law jurisdictions that use the doctrine of res ipsa loquitur.

Some lawyers prefer to avoid the expression res ipsa loquitur (for example, Hobhouse LJ in Radcliff v. Plymouth). But other lawyers (and judges too) still find the expression a convenient one (for example, see the judgement of Mr Justice Bokhary, a Permanent Judge of the Court of Final Appeal of Hong Kong, in Sanfield Building Contractors Ltd v. Li Kai Cheong).

The expression res ipsa loquitur is not a doctrine but a "mode of inferential reasoning" and applies only to accidents of unknown cause. Res ipsa loquitur comes into play where an accident of unknown cause is one that would not normally happen without negligence on the part of the defendant in control of the object or activity which injured the plaintiff or damaged his property. In such a situation the court is able to infer negligence on the defendant's part unless he offers an acceptable explanation consistent with his having taken reasonable care.

=== Ireland ===
The Irish courts have applied the doctrine. In Hanrahan v. Merck, Sharp & Dohme (Ireland) Ltd. [1988] ILRM 629 the supreme court held that in cases of nuisance the burden of proof could be shifted to the defendant where it would be palpably unfair for the plaintiff to have to prove something beyond their reach. The facts concerned poisoning of farm animals downwind of a chemical plant.

In Rothwell v. The Motor Insurers Bureau of Ireland [2003] 1 IR 268 the supreme court held the burden of proof would shift when the knowledge is exclusive to the defendant, but also where it is "especially within the range" of the defendant's capacity to probe the facts.

=== South Africa ===
In South African law (which is modelled on Roman Dutch law), there is no doctrine of res ipsa loquitur, although the phrase is used regularly to mean the "facts speak for themselves". Res ipsa loquitur does not shift any burden of proof or onus from one party to the other. The phrase is merely a handy phrase used by lawyers.

=== United Kingdom ===
The doctrine exists in both English law and Scots law.

==== England and Wales ====
In English tort law, the effect of res ipsa loquitur is a strong inference in favour of the claimant that negligence has taken place. It does not however fully reverse the burden of proof (Ng Chun Pui v. Li Chuen Tat, 1988).

The requirement of control is important in English law. This requirement was not satisfied in Easson v. LNE Ry [1944] 2 KB 421, where a small child fell off a train several miles after it had left the station. It was considered that the door of the train was not sufficiently under control of the railway company after the train started moving and could have been opened by somebody for whom the company was not responsible. This case was distinguished from the earlier Gee v. Metropolitan Ry where the plaintiff fell from the train immediately after it left the station, when the door through which he fell could still be considered to be fully controlled by the railway company.

The requirement that the exact cause of the accident must be unknown is illustrated by the case of Barkway v. South Wales Transport. In this case a bus veered across the road and it was known that the accident was caused by a flat tyre. In this case, the plaintiff could not be assisted by res ipsa loquitur and had to go on to prove that the flat tyre was caused by the transport company's negligence.

==== Scotland ====
The doctrine exists in the Scots law of delict. The leading case is that of Scott v London & Catherine Dock Co. This case laid down 3 requirements for the doctrine to apply:

1. There must be reasonable evidence of negligence
2. The circumstances must be under the direct control of the defender or his servants
3. The accident must be of such a type that would not occur without negligence.

In Scott, the court held that sacks of sugar do not fall out of warehouses and crush passers-by without somebody having been negligent along the way, so the plaintiff did not need to show how it happened.

Recent examples in Scotland are McDyer v Celtic Football Club and McQueen v The Glasgow Garden Festival 1988 Ltd.

=== United States ===
Under United States common law, res ipsa loquitur has the following requirements:

1. The event does not normally occur unless someone has acted negligently;
2. The evidence rules out the possibility that the actions of the plaintiff or a third party caused the injury; and
3. The type of negligence in question falls within the scope of the defendant's duty to the plaintiff.

Most American courts recognize res ipsa loquitur. The Restatement (Second) of Torts, § 328D describes a two-step process for establishing res ipsa loquitur. The first step is whether the accident is the kind usually caused by negligence, and the second is whether or not the defendant had exclusive control over the instrumentality that caused the accident. If found, res ipsa loquitur creates an inference of negligence, although in most cases it does not necessarily result in a directed verdict. The Restatement (Third) of Torts, § 17, adopts a similar test, although it eschews the exclusive control element.

The doctrine was not initially welcome in medical malpractice cases. In Gray v. Wright, a seven-inch hemostat was left in Mrs. Gray during gallbladder surgery in June 1947, and despite her chronic complaints about stomach pain over the years, the device was not found until an X-ray in March 1953, when it was removed. Her $12,000 award was reversed by the Supreme Court of West Virginia because she was outside the statute of limitations when she filed and could not prove that the doctor concealed knowledge of his error. This "guilty knowledge" requirement disappeared over the years, and the "discovery rule" by which statutes of limitation run from the date of discovery of the wrongdoing rather than the date of the occurrence has become the rule in most states.

Forty years later, leaving a medical device in a patient was medical malpractice, provable without expert testimony, in almost every jurisdiction. Virginia has limited the rule. The Virginia Supreme Court stated in 1996: "Almost 60 years ago, this Court, discussing res ipsa loquitur, said: 'In Virginia the doctrine, if not entirely abolished, has been limited and restricted to a very material extent.' City of Richmond v. Hood Rubber Products Co., 168 Va. 11, 17, 190 S.E. 95, 98 (1937). ... It may be utilized only when the circumstances of the incident, without further proof, are such that, in the ordinary course of events, the incident could not have happened except on the theory of negligence."

A contention of res ipsa loquitur commonly is made in cases of commercial airplane accidents. It was part of the commentary in a train collision in California in 2008: "If two trains are in the same place at the same time, somebody's made a terrible mistake."

In some states, the doctrine of res ipsa loquitur is also used as a method of proving the intent or mens rea element of the inchoate crime of attempt. Under the Model Penal Code, "the behavior in question is thought to corroborate the defendant's criminal purpose", for example:

Possession of materials to be employed in the commission of the crime, which are specifically designed for such unlawful use or which serve no lawful purpose of the actor under the circumstances

— Model Penal Code

==== Criticism ====
Some US tort scholars have criticized the doctrine as an unnecessarily cumbersome way to state the simple proposition that negligence may be proved by circumstantial evidence. In their view, the doctrine does not promote clarity in courts' reasoning.
