= Premises =

Collective buildings part of a property

Premises are land and buildings together considered as a property. This usage arose from property owners finding the word in their title deeds, where it originally correctly meant "the aforementioned; what this document is about", from Latin prae-missus = "placed before".

In this sense, the word is always used in the plural, but singular in construction. Note that a single house or a single other piece of property is "premises", not a "premise", although the word "premises" is plural in form; e.g. "The equipment is on the customer's premises", never "The equipment is on the customer's premise".

== Law relating to premises ==
Premise is within the law and means that there is a standing for that particular law by example.

== Premises registration ==
Premises registration is "a way to locate where livestock or dead animals are kept or congregated." In the United States, it is voluntary according to the USDA, but may be mandatory for each state.

As of January 13, 2009 the USDA has entered into the federal register a document which provides for the expansion of implementation of a mandatory national animal identification system to be effective January 2010.

== See also ==
- Apartment building
- Parking lot
- Occupiers' liability in English law
