= Exculpatory clause =

Contract language that limits one party's ability to pursue damages

Within a contract, an exculpatory clause is a statement that aims to prevent one party from holding the other party liable for damages. An exculpatory clause is generally only enforceable if it does not conflict with existing public policy. The two other prerequisites for an exculpatory clause to be valid are that the contract must pertain to the involved parties' private affairs, and each of the involved parties must be free bargaining agents to the contract in question such that there is no adhesion.

== Example uses ==
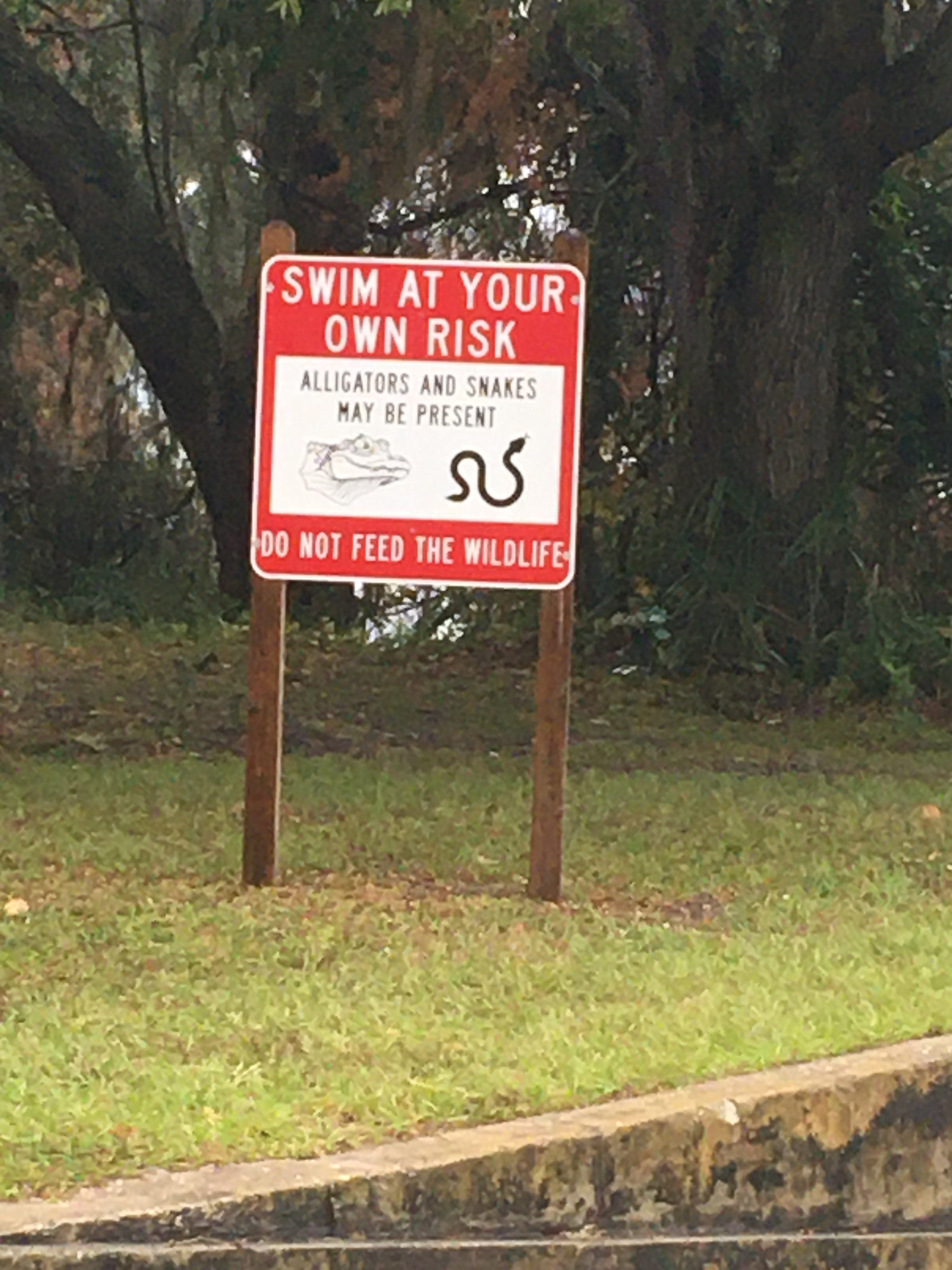
Swim at your own risk with diagram of snake and alligator, at a lake in Florida, US

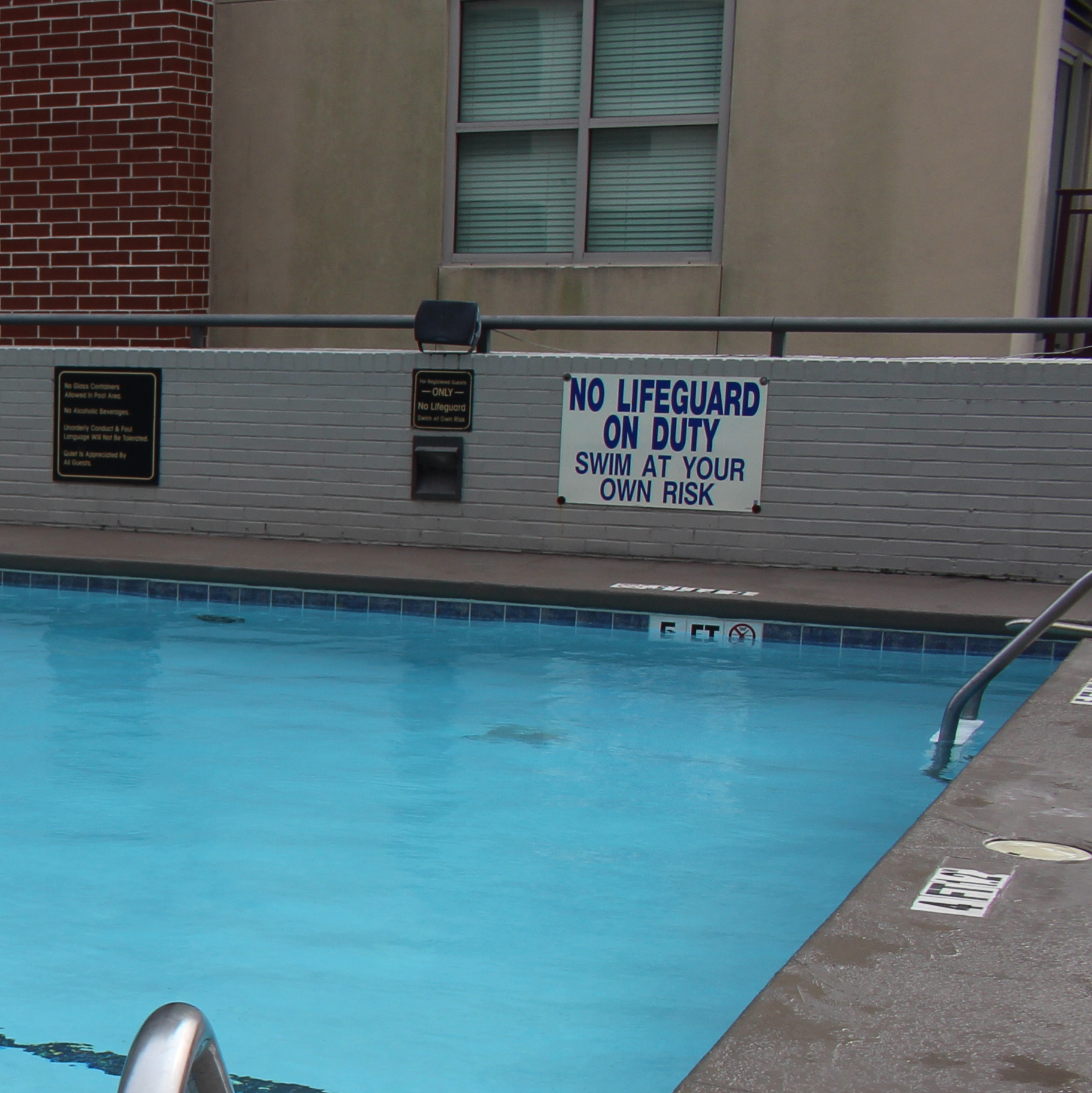
A swimming pool at Comfort Inn located in Downtown Charleston, South Carolina with a posted sign stating "No lifeguard on duty, swim at your own risk"

- In hospitality law, exculpatory clauses are sometimes used in waivers to absolve hotels of liability regarding unstaffed swimming pools open for visitor use, aided by signs displaying language such as "swim at your own risk".
- In construction law and real estate, exculpatory clauses are sometimes included in nonrecourse loans to minimize personal liability for the borrower.
- Exculpatory clauses are also applied more generally in construction law to immunize a person from the consequences of his/her negligence, though this application is subject to stringent standards.
- Ski resorts typically defend themselves with exculpatory clauses due to the inherent risk of injury involved with skiing, and thus it is usually very difficult for skiers to successfully win a personal injury lawsuit against the resort.
- In aviation law, activities like skydiving and performing an air show are typically uninsurable due to carrying such a high level of risk; this necessitates the usage of exculpatory clauses as risk management tools, so that individuals and businesses can defend against lawsuits in the event of injury or death.
- In medical law, most jurisdictions have ruled that exculpatory clauses are generally considered invalid for medical malpractice cases because health care is an important and sensitive area of public interest, though a common exception to this trend exists for experimental procedures.

== Additional resources ==
- Chart of exculpatory clause laws for all 50 U.S. states (begins on page 8; updated January 13, 2022)
