= Illegality in English law =

Legal doctrine

In the law of England and Wales, illegality is a potential ground in contract, tort, trusts or company law for a court to refuse to enforce an obligation. The illegality of a transaction, either because of public policy under the common law, or because of legislation, potentially means no action directly concerning the deal will be heard by the courts. The doctrine is reminiscent of the Latin phrase ex turpi causa non oritur actio, meaning "no cause of action arises from a wrong". The primary problem arising when courts refuse to enforce an agreement is the extent to which an innocent party may recover any property already conveyed through the transaction. Hence, illegality raises important questions for the law of unjust enrichment.

== Overview ==
One of the earliest reported cases is Everet v Williams (1725) where two Highwayman had a legal dispute over the proceeds of their robberies. The court declined to entertain the suit, and both litigants were later hanged.

In another early case, Holman v Johnson (1775) 1 Cowp 341, 343 Lord Mansfield CJ set out the rationale for the illegality doctrine.

The objection, that a contract is immoral or illegal as between plaintiff and defendant, sounds at all times very ill in the mouth of the defendant. It is not for his sake, however, that the objection is ever allowed; but it is founded in general principles of policy, which the defendant has the advantage of, contrary to the real justice, as between him and the plaintiff, by accident, if I may say so. The principle of public policy is this; ex dolo malo non oritur actio ["no action arises from deceit"]. No court will lend its aid to a man who founds his cause of action upon an immoral or an illegal act. If, from the plaintiff's own standing or otherwise, the cause of action appears to arise ex turpi causa ["from an immoral cause"], or the transgression of a positive law of this country, there the court says he has no right to be assisted. It is upon that ground the court goes; not for the sake of the defendant, but because they will not lend their aid to such a plaintiff. So if the plaintiff and defendant were to change sides, and the defendant was to bring his action against the plaintiff, the latter would then have the advantage of it; for where both were equally in fault, potior est conditio defendentis ["more important is the condition of the defendant"].

== Contract ==
- St John Shipping Corporation v Joseph Rank Ltd [1957] 1 QB 267, Devlin J purpose of the statute on overloading ships did not prevent enforceability of a carriage contract
- Archbolds (Freightage) Ltd v S Spanglett Ltd [1961] 2 QB 374, Devlin LJ, purpose of statute
- Janson v Driefontein Consolidated Mines Ltd [1902] AC 484, Lord Halsbury suggests the courts may no longer 'invent a new head of public policy', but this is doubtful

=== Public policy ===
- Pearce v Brooks (1866) LR 1 Ex 213, no compensation for a damaged brougham used for prostitution
- Richardson v Mellish (1824) 2 Bing 229, 252, Burroughs J, public policy is 'a very unruly horse, and when once you get astride it you never know where it will carry you'
- Enderby Town Football Club Ltd v The Football Association Ltd [1971] Ch 591, 606, 'with a good man in the saddle, the unruly horse can be kept in control. It can jump over obstacles.'
- Franco v Bolton (1797) 3 Ves 368, promise to pay someone to be a mistress
- Lowe v Peers (1768) 2 Burr 2225, restraining someone from marriage
- Law Reform (Miscellaneous Provisions) Act 1970 section 1, abolishing illegality in breach of a promise to marry
- Bigos v Bousted [1951] 1 All ER 92, contract contrary to exchange control regulations
- Miller v Karlinski (1945) 62 TLR 85, contract to defraud the Inland Revenue
- Beresford v Royal Exchange Assurance [1938] AC 586, life insurance contract including cover for suicide illegal, and unenforceable because at the time suicide was illegal
- Clay v Yates (1856) 1 H&C 73, contract to publish a libellous statement
- Elliot v Richardson (1870) LR 5 CP 744, agreement to obstruct bankruptcy proceedings
- Scott v Avery, parties can agree to have a dispute referred to an arbitrator
- Arbitration Act 1996 sections 68-69, 87, entitlement to appeal to a court after arbitration
- De Wutz v Hendricks (1824) 2 Bing 314, contract to facilitate overthrow of a friendly government
- Parkinson v College of Ambulance Ltd [1925] 2 KB 1, agreement to procure a knighthood contrary to public policy

=== Statute ===
- Ashmore, Benson & CO Ltd v AV Dawson Ltd [1973] 1 WLR 828, tube banks on overloaded lorries breaching a regulation, knowledge of illegality matters
- Nash v Stevenson Transport Ltd [1936] 2 KB 128, ignorance of the law is no defence
- Re Mahmoud and Ispahani [1921] 2 KB 716, linseed oil and license
- Gaming Act 1845 section 18, "all contracts or agreements, whether by parole or in writing, by way of gaming or wagering shall be null and void"
- Financial Services Act 1986
- Gambling Act 2005 section 335, and new Gambling Commission

=== Restraint of trade ===
- Esso Petroleum Co Ltd v Harper's Garage (Stourport) Ltd [1968] AC 269, a garage agreed to accept all petrol from Esso exclusively, valid if protecting a legitimate interest
- Herbert Morris Ltd v Saxelby [1916] 1 AC 688, to sue to enforce a contract restraining an employee from competing one must show "some proprietary right, whether in the nature of a trade connection or in the nature of trade secrets"
- Fitch v Dewes [1921] 2 AC 158
- Forster and Sons v Suggett (1918) 35 TLR 87
- Wyatt v Kreglinger and Fernau [1933] 1 KB 793
- Nordenfelt v Maxim Nordenfelt [1894] AC 535
- Schroeder Music Publishing Co Ltd v Macaulay [1974] 1 WLR 1308
- Alec Lobb (Garages) Ltd v Total Oil (Great Britain) Ltd [1985] 1 WLR 173

=== Employment rights ===
- Hounga v Allen
- Hall v Woolston Hall Leisure Ltd

== Tort ==
In the law of tort, the principle would prevent a criminal from bringing a claim against (for example) a fellow criminal. In National Coal Board v England Lord Asquith said,

If two burglars, Alice and Bob, agree to open a safe by means of explosives, and Alice so negligently handles the explosive charge as to injure Bob, Bob might find some difficulty in maintaining an action against Alice.

In Hewison v Meridian Shipping Services Pte Ltd, an employee who had obtained his position by concealing his epilepsy was held not to be entitled to claim compensation for future loss of earnings as a result of his employer's negligence, since his deception (resulting in a pecuniary advantage contrary to the Theft Act 1968) would prevent him from obtaining similar employment in future.

It is not absolute in effect. For example, in Revill v Newberry an elderly allotment holder was sleeping in his shed with a shotgun, to deter burglars. On hearing the plaintiff trying to break in, he shot his gun through a hole in the shed, injuring the plaintiff. At first instance, the defendant attempted to raise the defence of ex turpi to avoid the claim; this failed and he appealed against the decision. The Court of Appeal dismissed the defendant's appeal, holding that he was negligent to have shot blindly at body height, without shouting a warning or shooting a warning shot into the air, and that the response was out of all proportion to the threat.

The precise scope of the doctrine is not certain. In some cases, it seems that the illegality prevents a duty of care arising in the first place. For example, in Ashton v Turner the defendant crashed a car in the course of getting away from the scene of a burglary, injuring the plaintiff. Ewbank J held that the court may not recognise a duty of care in such cases as a matter of public policy. Similarly, in Pitts v Hunt, Balcombe LJ of the Court of Appeal rationalised this approach, saying that it was impossible to decide the appropriate standard of care in cases where the parties were involved in illegality. However, the other two judges, although reached the same conclusion, took different approaches. Beldam LJ favoured a public conscience approach which considers whether the general public would be outraged or view the court as indirectly encouraging a criminal act if they were to award damages. Dillon LJ meanwhile provided little practical guidance in his approach where the defence of illegality is successful when a claimant's cause of action arises "directly ex turpi causa".

== Trusts ==
The courts view ex turpi as a defence where otherwise a claim would lie, again on grounds of public policy. In Tinsley v Milligan Nicholls LJ in the Court of Appeal spoke of the court having to "weigh or balance the adverse consequences of granting relief against the adverse consequences of refusing relief". The plaintiff was ultimately successful in Tinsley v Milligan in the House of Lords, which allowed the claim on the grounds that the plaintiff did not need to rely on the illegality.

Gray v Thames Trains upheld the basic rule of public policy that disallowed recovery of anything stemming from a claimant's own wrongdoing.

Tinsley was overturned by the UK Supreme Court in Patel v Mirza.

== Companies ==
The effect of illegality under English law was most recently considered by the United Kingdom Supreme Court in Jetivia SA v Bilta (UK) Limited (in liquidation).

- Moore Stephens v Stone Rolls Ltd
- Safeway Stores Ltd v Twigger

== Unjust enrichment ==
- Strongman (1945) Ltd v Sincock [1955] 2 QB 525
- Shelley v Paddock [1980] 348, innocent person can recover damages after fraudulent misrepresentation
- AL Barnes Ltd v Time Talk (UK) Ltd [2003] EWCA Civ 402
- Hughes v Liverpool Victoria Legal Friendly Society [1916] 2 KB 482, not being in pari delicto
- Taylor v Bowers (1876) 1 QBD, repudiating illegal purpose
- Tribe v Tribe [1996] Ch 107, Millet LJ
- Bowmakers Ltd v Barnet Instruments Ltd [1945] KB 65
- Tinsley v Milligan [1994] 1 AC 340, recovery without relying on illegality
- Euro-Diam Ltd v Bathurst [1990] 1 QB 1

== See also ==
- In pari delicto
- Nemo auditur propriam turpitudinem allegans, civil law maxim
- NZ Illegal Contracts Act 1970
