= Clean hands doctrine =

Concept that requires parties to be honest in court processes

In non-criminal matters, the clean hands doctrine, also called the unclean hands doctrine or dirty hands doctrine, states that a party is required to be free of wrongdoing (come with "clean hands") if it wants the court to issue a ruling in their favour. The "wrongdoing" may consist of breaking the law, or acting unethically, unfairly or in bad faith with respect to the other party of the complaint. The wrongdoing must be directly related to the specific case at hand and not be just "background" misbehaviour. The purpose of the doctrine is to prevent disingenuous parties from benefitting from their own misconduct.

Showing "unclean hands" is an affirmative defence, which the judge has discretion to not approve. If a party raises it, it has the burden of proof to show that the other party is being dishonest. It is generally invoked by a defendant to the lawsuit to avoid liability. But plaintiffs may also use it offensively, too, to deny the defendant the possibility to raise other defences. The doctrine typically applies to equitable remedies only (e.g. requests for an injunction or specific performance), but some jurisdictions also allow application to suits in law (such as those seeking damages).

The clean hands doctrine is rooted in Roman law. Its outlines were made explicit in 18th-century practice of courts of equity in English law, and for that reason it has since become an integral part of common law jurisprudence. Civil law systems also have the related concept of prevention of "abuse of rights". However, scholars cannot agree if the clean hands doctrine is a universal principle of law. In particular, international law is reluctant to adopt the rule in full, although it has not explicitly rejected it, either.

== Description ==
The doctrine prevents those who have acted wrongly in some way relating to the matter at hand from receiving the help they seek from the courts, even if they are otherwise right in the case. This happens regardless of how the adversary has treated them. It will also apply to, for example, unjust enrichment cases when the misled wrongdoer tries to recover funds from an innocent party.

The party which acted dishonourably is said to have "unclean hands". Claiming "unclean hands" is normally something a defendant does, but it is possible for the plaintiff to do this, too. In some areas, the court adjudicating the case may consider this doctrine even if no one argued it. However, if this is not the case, at least in US legal tradition, it is generally required that such defence be raised at trial.

In general, the concept applies to lawsuits in equity (such as when requesting injunctions or specific performance), but with law-equity distinction becoming much less important, it is gradually expanding to suits in law. Tradition holds that the doctrine may not be used to ask for damages (a typical remedy in suits in law), but this too is changing.

The doctrine does not require blameless conduct in all domains of life. A party which wants to use it must show that bad actions are directly related to the current case. In other words, "if someone is a liar, a thief, or a notorious bad actor in general but not in a given transaction, equity is still available to that person." It also generally applies to given parties in the case only. The consequence is that, for example, in patent cases, unclean hands will merely render the patent unenforceable in a given case, and not invalid. However, the conduct that gives rise to the "unclean hands" defence does not need to be illegal. Non-criminal bad-faith, unethical or unfair behaviour may also be used as a basis of invoking the rule.

The principle that parties must come to the court with "clean hands" is absolute. But this does not mean that any violation of that principle will result in dismissal of claims, and in fact it must not be applied blindly. If the public interest in not dismissing the claims is overwhelming, or if following the doctrine is unlikely to further the interests of justice, the judge has discretion to disapply it. For example, the United States Court of Appeals for the Seventh Circuit dismissed the unclean hands defence in an antitrust case that would have undermined the purpose of competition law. Similarly, minor misconduct is unlikely to invalidate claims. It may occasionally be the case that the court will have to choose a "lesser evil" between denying access to justice to a party and averting a greater harm, such as of unjust enrichment.

The doctrine may apply to both parties at the same time if both parties are guilty of misconduct, which results in neither party getting what it wants. This is partially covered in the Latin maxim of in pari delicto. However, there are two differences. Unlike that maxim, the clean hands doctrine allows denying relief to any party found to be involved in wrongdoing, regardless of the degree of blame. In pari delicto also explicitly says that where the degree of blame is equal, the plaintiff will not get the upper hand in the lawsuit.

=== Appearance in English law ===
An article in Conveyancer and Property Lawyer, a law journal, traced back the origin of the doctrine in English law to around 1600 at the latest. Initially it seemed to only apply to cases where the plaintiff was found to have done something illegal (such as fraud), but there were cases such as Gobe v Dore (1604) which explicitly barred remedies for non-criminal but improper conduct. In that dispute, the plaintiff tried to deceive the landlord, whom he had poor relations with. The plan was to give money to the defendant as to make his name appear on the copyhold, but have the defendant let the plaintiff de facto use the parcel even though the landlord did not want it. The court denied eviction of the defendant, and so the plaintiff lost £100 (£28,000 in 2025 pounds). Other precursor cases are Jones v. Lenthal (1669), the Bodly’s Case (1679) and Small v. Brackley (1702).

The doctrine was explicitly formulated in the cases Fitzroy v. Gwillim (1786; Court of King's Bench, opinion by Chief Justice Lord Mansfield) and Dering v. Earl of Winchelsea (1787; Court of the Exchequer, Lord Chief Baron Eyre), respectively, from which the concept spread to other common law countries.

=== Alternative formulations ===
The doctrine may be restated as two legal maxims applied in cases about equity: "those seeking equity must do equity" and "he who comes into equity must come with clean hands". These principle are distinct in that the former applies to future conduct while the latter applies to conduct that already happened.

Sometimes it is also expressed by two maxims in Latin, ex delicto non oritur actio and ex turpi causa non oritur actio (an unlawful act/a dishonourable cause cannot serve as the basis of an action at law).

A. P. Herbert's Uncommon Law provided two other adages: "A good cause of action cannot be founded on a moral swamp", or a "less elegant" one, "A dirty dog will get no dinner from the Courts."

The doctrine is closely related to the tu quoque (“you too!”) argument. In short, blaming or condemning someone for wrongdoing that they are themselves guilty of is hypocritical. This would be analogous to "pot calling the kettle black", or to saying "Look who's talking!" in informal speech.

== Purpose ==
There are several reasons for adoption of this doctrine. The main one is that it prevents a dishonest party from profiting from its own wrongdoing. It also prevents the party from defeating the adversary's defences, because there is a principle in common law systems that using an equitable defence to further inequities is abusive. That said, these systems distinguish equitable remedies from legal remedies, and the latter cannot be barred by claiming "unclean hands".

Another goal of this doctrine is to protect judicial integrity, because the courts would otherwise be encouraging the wrongdoing by making themselves an instrument of injustice. There is also the question of finding a convenient term for protecting the public interest in cases where the bad conduct causes harm to unrelated people.

Ori Herstein of Cornell Law School and the Restatements of the Law also see the doctrine in punitive terms. This is because it lets wrongdoers know that their right to be heard in court may be forfeit due to their bad actions. This has a positive side effect of deterring dishonest parties from bad conduct. However, US courts, including the Supreme Court, often write that the doctrine is not meant to punish.

== Examples of application ==
1. An employee settled his workplace accident lawsuit against a school in Alabama for $40,000, with the condition that the money be spent on relevant medical expenses. The school set up accounts at local pharmacies in his name so that he could buy medication. However, a school official noticed that he misused the money to buy products that were not related to his back injury. The accounts were terminated, effectively locking the employee out of his settlement funds. He sued to reopen the account. However, the Alabama Court of Civil Appeals refused because the employee violated the terms of the settlement he had agreed to.
2. Citizens of Lake County, Indiana denied re-election to a county commissioner by choosing his opponent in the primary. The rival won the general election. The plaintiff was a protégé of the ousted commissioner. Due to his connections, he was employed by the county in what he admitted was a sinecure. Providing "ghost employment" in the government is a felony under Indiana Code § 35-44.1-1-3. When the new commissioner, Rudolph Clay, was sworn in, he immediately fired the plaintiff and installed Clay's own son in his place.
  The plaintiff filed a Section 1983 civil rights lawsuit against Clay and the county and cited case law that interpreted the First Amendment to forbid a public employer to fire an employee on political grounds unless the employee is either a policy-making employee or a confidential one. The plaintiff was neither. Meanwhile, that same person was convicted of tax evasion and sentenced to nine years in prison. The plaintiff sought reinstatement and back pay for the illegal dismissal. However, the court denied it not only because of impracticality and possibly outrageousness of employing inmates in the government, but also because of the plaintiff's "parasitism" on county coffers, which caused harm to taxpayers. He could not argue that the First Amendment both guarantees the spoils system for him but forbids it for county executives. Although this meant that the new county commissioner got his way, the Seventh Circuit assured the sinecure for Clay's son would not last forever as "he who lives by patronage shall perish by it".
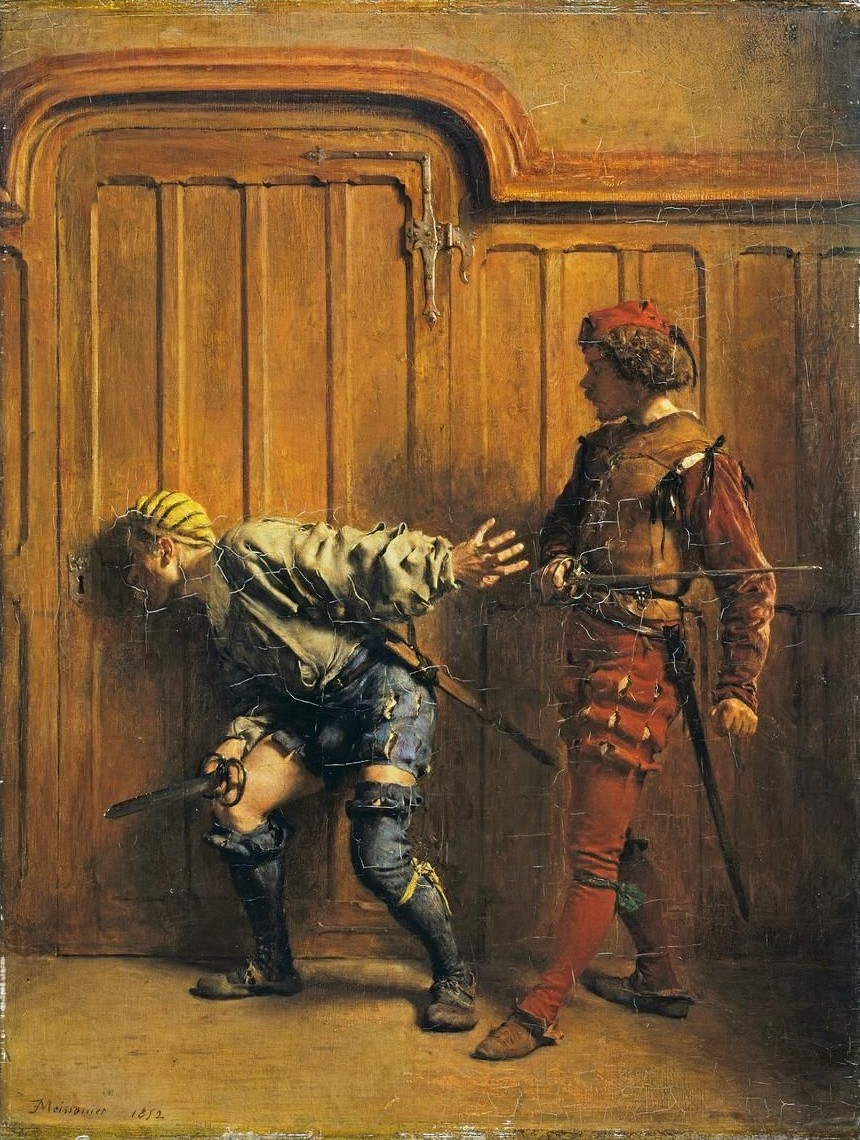
3. The Hired Assassins by Ernest Meissonier (1852). If the hitmen fail to murder the target, the person who paid them cannot go to court to plead "breach of contract killing" and ask the money back
  A secretary of a charity approached a colonel. The secretary promised that he would be able to get a knighthood if he donated to the charity. The colonel contributed £3,000 (£158,000 in 2025 pounds), but did not receive the title. He sued to recover the money. The promise was fraudulent because the charity had no influence on the process of granting knighthood, and it was in breach of contract, too. However, he was essentially trying to bribe his way into honours. Even if the contract had been legal (which it was not), it would be against public policy to support this conduct. The money was lost.
  However, Patel v Mirza [2016] UKSC 42 backtracked on some of the logic of that case. In this case, Patel paid Mirza £620,000 (£989,000 in 2025 pounds) as part of a contract that aimed to profit from Mirza's insider information regarding a relevant government announcement about the Royal Bank of Scotland. Mirza promised to place bets on Patel's behalf but it became clear that his information was mistaken, so he did not, but he also refused to return the money. Patel sued. Insider trading is unlawful, but the Supreme Court of the United Kingdom did allow Patel to recover money because this outcome would return the parties to status quo. The alternative would be to let Mirza unjustly enrich himself even though he was the one peddling insider information. This would not further justice. The ruling also noted that sensibilities changed since 1925, and letting bribes stay in the pockets of a politician, a party or a charity that solicited a bribe would be frowned upon much more than returning the money to the person who gave it. A later ruling by the England and Wales Court of Appeal altogether suggested that the original knighthood case was bad precedent.
4. A husband and a wife were both claiming undivided ownership of a lakeside property in Ontario. The husband was the original owner of the house. However, he also owed a lot of unpaid taxes to Revenue Canada, and so was afraid that the tax authority would seize it. On advice of a lawyer, the husband transferred the property to his then-fiancée, since he wanted to avoid declaring bankruptcy. But the stipulated price in the contract was never paid. When the couple separated, the husband claimed continued ownership of property via resulting trust, and when the house was sold by the wife to a third party, he sued to get the proceeds. However, both parties agreed that the real purpose of the initial "sale" was to hide assets from the taxman. The court thus found that the husband had no legitimate interest in the property. If he first told the creditor (Revenue Canada) that the owner was his wife, he was barred from later asserting in court that the property was his own. In a similar case from North Carolina, an appeals court denied a man the possibility to have his house returned since he had bought it with money he earned from bootlegging.
  On the other hand, the House of Lords decision in Tinsley v Milligan [1993] UKHL 3 took the approach that mere unlawful conduct was not enough, and instead it needs to be demonstrated that the party that allegedly had unclean hands could not justify their claims through any way that would not implicate illegality, immorality or unfairness. Since Milligan could rely on a legal reason (that is, that she paid half of the purchase money and maintained the house), and did not need to implicate her welfare fraud in her arguments to get half the house, the Lordships ruled that "unclean hands" did not apply. The verdict was overturned by Patel v Mirza (see above) as under Tinsley, wrongdoers could go scot-free if they were lucky to be able to justify bad conduct in retrospect through plausibly legal mechanisms.
5. Plaintiff owned an Internet media consulting firm and a website for transgender people. Defendant, who owned websites that advertised escort services and gender counselling, attacked the plaintiff as a "mentally ill transvestite man who attacks transsexual women in Toronto". The plaintiff sought a court order to remove articles containing this libellous statement. However, just after 9/11, he had also published an article saying that the defendant was providing escort services to Osama bin Laden when the leader of Al-Qaeda supposedly was in Canada. When confronted, the plaintiff could not explain this away, other than with a disclaimer that the piece was for "entertainment purposes only". The requested injunction was denied.
6. A private limited company, anonymized as W. sp. z o.o., delivered wine to another company, C. sp.k. (spółka komandytowa, a type of company in Polish law), but the company did not pay. W. sp. z o.o. sued A.D., the unlimited liability partner of C. sp.k. At the same time, W. sp. z o.o. was a limited liability partner of the same C. sp.k. The authorised agent (prokurent) of C. sp.k. was simultaneously the chief executive officer of W. sp. z o.o. In their capacity as CEO, they refused to help C. sp.k. in the litigation. A.D., who stood to lose money, argued that the facially sound lawsuit was in fact abusive. Their contention was that W. sp. z o.o. had a fiduciary duty to C. sp.k. as a partner, and yet its CEO was sabotaging C. sp.k.'s defence. Coupled with the fact that the CEO was also the authorised agent of the sued company, this showed that the CEO/authorised agent was not loyal to C. sp.k., and so W. sp. z o.o. was entitled to nothing. Lower courts agreed with this framing, but the Supreme Court of Poland overturned their rulings. The reasoning in the cassation verdict was that C. sp.k., and A.D. by extension, were also at fault for not paying for the wine in the first place, regardless of the complicated connections between the parties in the case.
7. Kishore Samrite was a member of the legislature of Madhya Pradesh. In Allahabad High Court, Samrite wrote a brief on behalf of three people—a Congress worker, his wife and their daughter—as a next friend. He alleged that they were falsely imprisoned and possibly missing, and also that the daughter was gang-raped by foreigners. However, a lawyer in Lucknow, Uttar Pradesh, had already his complaint based on the same allegations dismissed. The High Court transferred his case to a division bench without letting Samrite know about the change. The bench made a referral to the Central Bureau of Investigation for making false accusations and imposed ₹5 million in court costs. Samrite appealed to the Supreme Court of India, protesting both the lack of notice and the big sum for payment. The top court agreed that the transfer to a division bench was procedurally improper. But it also found that the lawsuit was based on falsehoods, Samrite did not disclose that a substantially same lawsuit had been dismissed, and also stated that the case was driven by malice and political animus. Not only did Samrite lose, he was ordered to pay ₹500,000 in exemplary damages to the person he accused of wrongdoing for filing a frivolous lawsuit. The unidentified person was exonerated.

== Countries that apply it ==
=== Canada ===
Common-law Canadian jurisprudence recognises the doctrine of clean hands in various contexts, with its usual limitations, and has been endorsed by the Supreme Court of Canada. "Unclean hands" may be in particular applied in ex parte proceedings (without the presence of the other party), but the party seeking a remedy through that procedure must make full disclosure of all facts known to it, rather than just not misleading the court, lest their motion be denied. Canadian courts do not allow the clean hands defence to bar legal remedies.

==== Quebec ====
Quebec has a civil-law based system for private law matters, so it does not operate on precedent. Whether the clean hands doctrine (théorie des mains propres) may be invoked in Quebec courts is controversial. The Office québécois de la langue française, a government institution, reposted a law dictionary entry that says that the province's legal practice is incompatible with the concept of clean hands due to the requirement that judges a) apply higher-order rules and principles first and b) balance the claims of both parties regardless of degree of fault. That said, in practice, this common law theory has found partial acceptance in Quebec's civil law, at least with respect to injunctions.

=== India ===
Although India has a Code of Civil Procedure, Indian courts have applied the clean hands doctrine to deny equitable relief. In Ramjas Foundation & Ors vs Union Of India & Ors (2010), the Supreme Court of India made it explicit that all courts and quasi-judicial bodies in India must apply the doctrine. In fact, the Supreme Court has imposed exemplary damages on unscrupulous parties, and treats parties who are forum shopping as those having unclean hands. Public interest litigants are not exempted from the doctrine. However, very important constitutional or legal questions unrelated to the party's misconduct sometimes have been nevertheless decided separately. Courts may still deny relief to the misbehaving party but will rule on the underlying claims for future guidance, instead of dismissing the case out of hand.

=== Poland ===
There is consensus in Polish courts that parties who have misbehaved in a given case are not entitled to relief they want. This rule has been endorsed in a string of Supreme Court rulings stretching from the 1960s. For example, in the case of a self-help eviction, the top court stressed that "It is not possible for a person to claim abuse of rights if they themselves blatantly illegally stripped the plaintiff of their flat, depriving them in this way of a place to stay and making it impossible for them to use all the claims that they could raise in case of an eviction lawsuit against [the defendant]." (Note: Polish: Nie może na nadużycie prawa powoływać się osoba, która sama w sposób rażąco bezprawny wyzuła powoda z mieszkania, pozbawiając go w ten sposób dachu nad głową i uniemożliwiając mu korzystanie z tych wszystkich środków, które mógłby on podnieść w wypadku wniesienia przeciwko niemu powództwa o eksmisję z mieszkania)

The interpretation that allows the defence stems from article 5 of the Civil Code, and in employment matters, an analogous article 8 of the Labour Code. The Civil Code provision says that "It is not allowed to derive benefit from a right if this would be against the socio-economic purpose of that right or against the rules of social co-existence. Such action or omission by the holder of rights is not considered an exercise of these rights and is not protected." However, like in other countries, the application of the "unclean hands" rule is not automatic.

=== United Kingdom ===
The United Kingdom, from which the concept of "unclean hands" originated, still uses the doctrine extensively.

=== United States ===
Usage of unclean hands defence in suits in law by US state State supreme court bans the defence Implicitly not recognised by state supreme courts Precedent from lower courts does not recognise the defence State supreme court bans the defence of laches, implying they would also be reluctant to allow the unclean hands defence Precedent from lower courts endorses the defence State supreme court endorses the defence No explicit information on practice of state courts in the source

Courts in the United States recognise this doctrine. However, case law is highly variable as to the possibility of successfully employing it. In federal courts, this depends on the subject matter of the dispute (see sections below) and often also on the states where the case is pending, as federal courts have to apply state law unless there is a clear federal law.

==== State courts ====
Jurisprudence in many US states (see map) still holds the traditional view that the "unclean hands" defence is limited to equitable remedies only. Only California's and Michigan's supreme courts have endorsed it for suits in law. Lower courts of four other states (Maryland, New York, Oregon and Rhode Island) also allowed it.

Even though the law of Louisiana in private law matters is substantially different from other US states as it is based on civil law legal systems, Louisiana also recognises the defence. However, it only applies to suits in equity and only where there is no law that covers the disputed matter. (Note: Louisiana courts do not operate on precedent in private law matters (see jurisprudence constante))

==== Corporate lawsuits ====
If the actions of a party to a contract are illegal, immoral, unethical or unconscionable, the contract will be unenforceable. Federal case law suggests that bad behaviour may potentially even void the contract.

Many US courts deny application of the unclean hands doctrine in antitrust cases. In Perma Life Mufflers v. Int'l Parts Corp., 392 U.S. 134 (1968), plaintiffs operated Midas franchises. As a condition of cooperation, Midas imposed several anti-competitive practices. But franchisees willingly sought and bought more of the franchises, fully aware of the tight restrictions, until at one moment they decided to sue. The Supreme Court said that it did not find Congress actually wanted to allow the use of in pari delicto defence in private antitrust action, and there was a valid public purpose for busting anti-competitive practices, and so it granted the relief requested (striking the restrictions).

The doctrine may still apply in cases when the plaintiff is themselves guilty of conduct it alleges to be illegal under antitrust laws. For example, the Second Circuit threw out a complaint from Gatt, a participant in a bid-rigging and price-fixing scheme who broke ranks because they felt they were not getting enough contracts from it. Gatt sought damages totalling over $13 million over alleged losses caused by PMC's termination of the dealership licence (PMC orchestrated and coordinated the scheme). The ruling declined to rule based on the doctrine (rather, it dismissed the lawsuit due to lack of standing, as Gatt could not demonstrate harm the termination of their dealership agreement caused, unlike the government agencies in New York). But it noted that First, Fourth, Seventh and Ninth circuits did in fact rely on in pari delicto or unclean hands defences in various contexts, and a judge's concurrence in this case was explicitly based on the in pari delicto maxim.

==== Employment law ====
The unclean hands doctrine applies to lawsuits alleging employee misconduct, which may bar claims under Title VII of the Civil Rights Act of 1964, Age Discrimination in Employment Act or Americans with Disabilities Act. The Supreme Court recognised in McKennon v. Nashville Banner Publishing Co., 513 U.S. 352 (1995) that if the employer would have fired or will fire a worker anyway for a legal reason, courts should not intervene to reinstate the employee. The employer does not need to prove that the misconduct was so severe as to cause termination of employment. The same logic may also bar the award of front pay. Front pay is the equivalent of damages in employment law that the Supreme Court nevertheless qualifies as equitable relief.

==== Environmental litigation ====
Courts tend to dismiss the defence in Superfund lawsuits.

==== Intellectual property ====
In US patent law, the defence exists but is more likely to be framed in terms of a derived concept known as inequitable conduct, rather than the clean hands doctrine itself. The concept of "misuse" as a defence also developed from cases when owners of patents with unclean hands were losing cases of patent infringement due to their conduct. The party that raises the issue of "unclean hands" requires clear and convincing evidence to prove it, which may be difficult. The defences apply whether or not the United States Patent and Trademark Office or the Copyright Office were actually involved.

For example, in Morton Salt Co. v. G.S. Suppiger Co. (1942), Morton was found to be misusing its patent to extend monopoly power beyond the claims of the patent (in this case, requiring that users of Morton's patented devices only use tablets of unpatentable salt produced by a subsidiary of that company). The Supreme Court found that the tie-in sale clause was hindering competition in the salt tablet market. Because salt tablets were not the focus of the patent, Morton was acting with "unclean hands" and the court did not let Morton enforce their patent that way. In Hazel-Atlas Glass Co. v. Hartford Empire Co. (1944), Hartford's patent attorney wrote a shill article and then bribed a union official to put their name on it in a trade journal. Hartford then used the publication to further their case before the USPTO and then to support their infringement lawsuit. The Supreme Court set aside the resulting settlement as obtained by fraud. Similarly, in 1945, the Supreme Court rendered unenforceable a patent in a lawsuit against the original patent holder who surrendered the intellectual property under blackmail, where the threats were based on lies. A DePaul University journal article suggests that patent misuse has since been gradually narrowed in application, but a piece from the University of Miami Law Review says that to the contrary, the Federal Circuit has since expanded the rule since the adoption of the Patent Act of 1952.

Courts used to cite Lowell v. Lewis (1817) to invalidate "immoral" patents, arguing that immorality precluded usefulness, but this view is now obsolete. In Juicy Whip, Inc. v. Orange Bang, Inc. (1999), the Federal Circuit upheld a patent for a carbonated drink machine that was serving drinks post-mix (that is, loaded with syrup and water separately and then mixed inside the machine) but had a device that led consumers to believe the drink was pre-mixed (i.e. initially filled with a ready drink formulation). However, standard equity defences apply to patents too, per eBay Inc. v. MercExchange LLC (2006).

The situation is different in copyrights. The unclean hands defence does work in copyright cases, as the notion of copyright misuse is used in various circuits, and is expanding. However, when obscenity is involved, the situation becomes much more complicated. Ned Snow of the Joseph F. Rice School of Law argues that unclean hands could apply to deny copyright trolls the possibility to enforce copyright claims to obscene materials, such as pornography. Some courts do follow this interpretation due to federal laws banning sale or transportation of porn in interstate commerce, or possession or production of child pornography. Other federal courts resist this interpretation, citing Mitchell Bros. Film Group v. Cinema Adult Theater (5th Cir. 1979) that specifically barred the defence for obscene materials. The Mitchell court required the person invoking the "clean hands doctrine" to demonstrate that the copyright holder directly harmed the person, which, however, happens rarely in the context of copyright litigation.

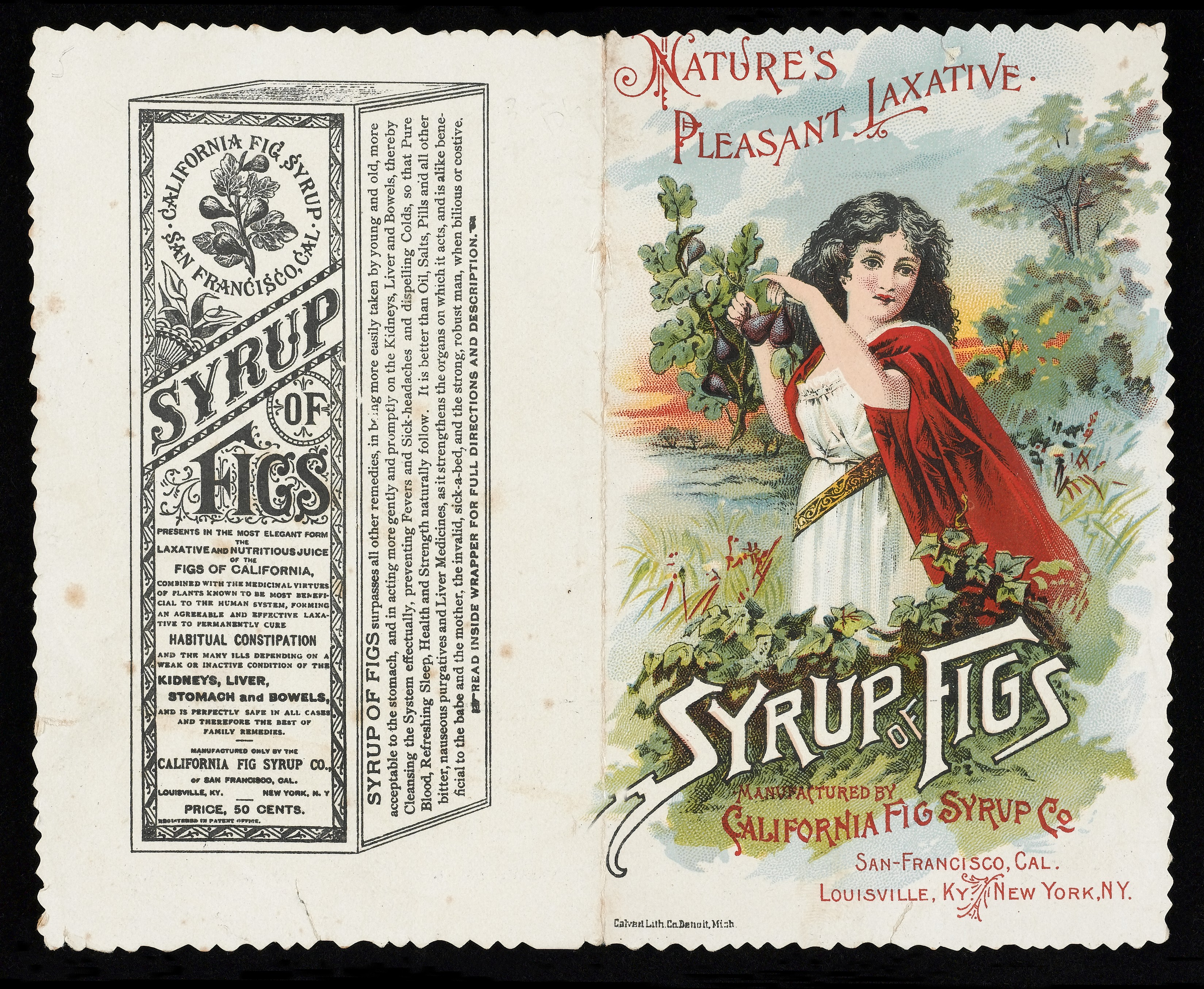
A California Fig Syrup Company ad. To get trademark protection, the trademarked name cannot mislead consumers as to the nature of the marketed product

Misleading trademarks are unenforceable due to the doctrine. The Supreme Court in Worden v. California Fig Syrup Co. (1903) dismissed California Fig Syrup Company's pleading of trademark infringement. This was because the laxative they marketed as "Syrup of Figs" did not actually contain any figs (it used senna instead). However, as of 2007, no court developed the notion of "trademark misuse", by analogy with patents and copyrights.

==== Government misconduct ====
There is controversy as to whether the government is bound by the clean hands doctrine. Justice Brandeis’s dissent in Olmstead v. United States argued that the doctrine should apply doubly to the executive (a position since rejected by case law), but some lower courts, particularly the federal district court for the District of Columbia, take the position that it does not apply to the government at all. The Supreme Court did exempt the government from certain defences, such as laches or non-mutual offensive collateral estoppel, but it did not explicitly do so for unclean hands. In fact, when the Solicitor General in Heckler v. Community Health Services of Crawford County, Inc. (1984) pressed the Supreme Court to recognise that unclean hands could never estop the government, the court refrained from issuing a ruling to that effect.

William Baude of the University of Chicago Law School argues that there are legitimate cases when the doctrine may be applied to government's actions, but it is a narrower set of cases than typically allowed for private parties due to the special nature of the government as sole prosecutor and an agent specifically created to enforce public interest. As examples of legitimate cases, he mentions Justice Sotomayor's dissent in D.V.D. v. Department of Homeland Security (2025), where the Trump administration successfully argued to overturn a district court injunction against deporting illegal immigrants that it had appeared to violate or to evade. Another is United States v, Russell (D. Md. 2025; appealed to the Fourth Circuit), where the administration sued the whole district court for imposing a standing order that automatically applies 48-hour protection to habeas corpus petitioners in immigration cases. Baude says it was likely created due to the government's bad conduct in prior immigration cases and the court's fear that the government would retaliate against petitioners by deporting them before their case could be heard—which could be reasonably construed as "unclean hands" conduct.

== Countries that do not recognise the doctrine ==
=== Switzerland ===
In the context of a competition law case decided in 2003, the Federal Supreme Court of Switzerland declared that the "unclean hands" doctrine does not exist in Swiss law. Specifically, the court said that "there is no general rule saying that only the one who respects the law may ask that it be respected. [...] Also, federal jurisprudence has long excluded said objection, even if it did not use the [exact] expression that characterises it ("unclean hands")". (Note: French: Il n'existe pas de règle générale voulant que seul celui qui respecte la loi puisse en réclamer le respect [...] Aussi la jurisprudence fédérale exclut-elle de longue date la susdite objection, même si elle n'utilise pas l'expression qui la caractérise ("unclean hands"))

=== Germany ===
Germany does not have the unclean hands defence as such. There are legal provisions that approximate the concept, namely article 242 of the Civil Code (which codifies the duty to act in good faith) and article 8 of the Unfair Competition Act (prohibiting abuse of rights). However, denial of claims generally requires some form of egregious conduct or conduct plainly aimed at undermining the other party. For example, just because a company uses the same misleading advertising tactics that it accuses the other party of does not by itself disqualify the lawsuit. But if these cease-and-desist letters were sent en masse, or if the real purpose of the court case is to gain an unfair advantage at the expense of the defendant (who is a competitor), a judge may dismiss a lawsuit.
