= Moore Stephens v Stone Rolls Ltd (in liq) =

2009 UK legal case

Stone & Rolls Ltd v Moore Stephens
- Court: House of Lords
- Full case name: Moore Stephens (a firm) v Stone Rolls Ltd
- Decided: 30 July 2009
- Citation: [2009] UKHL 39, [2009] 1 AC 1391

Case history
- Prior actions: Moore Stephens (A Firm) v Stone & Rolls Ltd (In Liquidation) [2008] EWCA Civ 644 (18 June 2008), setting aside Stone & Rolls Ltd v Moore Stephens (a firm) [2007] EWHC 1826 (Comm) (27 July 2007)

Court membership
- Judges sitting: Lord Phillips of Worth Matravers; Lord Scott of Foscote; Lord Walker of Gestingthorpe; Lord Brown of Eaton-under-Heywood; Lord Mance

Case opinions
- Decision by: Lord Phillips of Worth Matravers; Lord Walker of Gestingthorpe; Lord Brown of Eaton-under-Heywood
- Dissent: Lord Mance; Lord Scott of Foscote

Keywords
- fraud; illegality; attribution

Stone & Rolls Ltd v Moore Stephens [2009] UKHL 39 is a leading case relevant for UK company law and the law on fraud and ex turpi causa non oritur actio. The House of Lords decided by a majority of three to two that where the director and sole shareholder of a closely held private company deceived the auditors with fraud carried out on all creditors, subsequently the creditors of the insolvent company would be barred from suing the auditors for negligence from the shoes of the company. The Lords reasoned that where the company was only identifiable with one person, the fraud of that person would be attributable to the company, and the "company" (or the creditors standing in its insolvent shoes) could not rely on its own illegal fraud when bringing a claim for negligence against any auditors. It was the last case to be argued before the House of Lords.

The decision was subject to much criticism, and was reviewed by the Supreme Court in Jetivia SA v Bilta (UK) Limited (in liquidation).

== Facts ==
Stone & Rolls Ltd was wholly owned and directed by Mr Stojevic. Moore Stephens was the firm of chartered accountants hired to perform audits between 1996 and 1998. Mr Stojevic deceitfully siphoned assets of the company away and falsified accounts to show more profitable transactions than were real. In previous litigation, one of the main victims (a Czech bank, Komerční banka) had successfully sued both the company and Mr Stojevic. The company went into liquidation.

The company's creditors, acting in the name of the company, wished to sue the auditors for failing to detect the fraud, since both the company and Mr Stojevic were out of money. They claimed US$174m. The firm requested that the claim be struck out even before any question of their negligence was raised. They argued that even if they had been negligent it would be contrary to public policy to let the company sue them, because that would involve breach of the principle that a claimant cannot come to court and make a plea whilst relying on his own illegal behaviour (ex turpi causa non oritur actio).

== Judgment ==
=== High Court ===
At the Commercial Court, Langley J held Mr Stojevic's actions and state of mind were to be attributed to the company. Because they were the same thing, it was artificial to describe the company as a "victim" of the fraud, and therefore to let the company sue the auditor. However, because detecting the fraud was the very thing the auditors were engaged to do, they would not be allowed to rely on the ex turpi causa defence to a negligence claim.

=== Court of Appeal ===
At the Court of Appeal of England and Wales, Mummery, Keene and Rimer LJJ reversed Langley J's decision in part, holding that:

- the illegality defence could not be removed simply because the very thing the auditors were meant to do was to detect fraud.
- the judge was otherwise correct in his conclusion on the issue of attribution.

Rimer LJ, in his concurring opinion, summarized why Moore Stephens did not owe a duty of care in this case:

115. Is the firm potentially liable in negligence to this fraudulent company? No. The company's case is that the firm failed to use reasonable care to detect Mr Stojevic's fraud. In my view, the firm did not owe a duty of care to the company, which was a fraudster in the total grip of another fraudster. As a general rule a fraudster, individual or corporate, is legally liable for the losses that flow directly from the fraud and cannot blame such losses on the negligence of another person, such as the victim or whoever.

=== House of Lords ===
In a split 3 to 2 ruling, the House of Lords dismissed the appeal and held by a majority that the auditors, Moore Stephens, could not be sued by the company's creditors. Although each judge gave slightly different reasons, Lords Phillips, Walker and Brown held the ex turpi causa defence barred the company's claim against the liquidator for negligence. Since Mr Stojevic was the exclusive owner and controller, it was logically necessary that his fraudulent intentions be attributed to the company. More specifically, Lord Phillips identified that the fraudulent act was done for the benefit of the company, and therefore the act of Mr Stojevic was attributed to be the act of Stone & Rolls through the organic process of attribution. The company was therefore deemed to be "aware" of the fraud and primarily liable for it. The auditors owed a duty to perform their audit diligently to the company (not to individual shareholders or creditors), and so if the company tried to bring a claim for breach of that duty it would necessarily be relying on its own illegality. Accordingly, the defence of ex turpi causa non oritur actio should be open to the auditors. Both Lord Walker and Lord Brown rejected that there should exist any principle that the ex turpi causa defence would be overridden when the duty involved was to protect against one's own criminality.

Lord Scott and Lord Mance dissented. Commentators argue that the majority misapplied the facts and overlooked the relevance of insolvency to the application of attribution.

Issue	Majority		Dissenting	
Issue	Lord Phillips (lead judgment)	Lord Walker (Lord Brown concurring)	Lord Mance	Lord Scott
The defence of ex turpi causa non oritur actio	There is no general principle that the claimant must either plead, give evidence of or rely on his own illegality for the principle to apply.	While the House of Lords was unanimous in Tinsley v Milligan in disapproving a "public conscience" test, it was divided over the correct test. The majority identified the test as whether the claimant had to plead or rely on his own illegality, while the minority favoured a broader test of whether the claim was tainted by illegality.	The present case does not involve the operation of this principle, as the courts need to avoid permitting a claimant "to indirectly profit from his or her crime, in the sense of obtaining remuneration for it" or in the sense of evading "a penalty prescribed by criminal law", to avoid putting "the courts in the position of saying that the same conduct is both legal, in the sense of being capable of rectification by the court, and illegal." An auditor cannot, by reference to ex turpi causa, defeat a claim for breach of duty in failing to detect managerial fraud at the company's highest level by attributing to the company the very fraud which the auditor should have detected.	The present case is one of contractual (as opposed to tortious) negligence. In that regard, S&R can found a cause of action against Moore Stephens without reliance on the fraudulent nature of Mr Stojevic's scheme. That raises issues relating to causation, which are better addressed at trial.
The defence of ex turpi causa non oritur actio	The court will not enforce a contract which is expressly or impliedly forbidden by statute or that is entered into with the intention of committing an illegal act.	While the House of Lords was unanimous in Tinsley v Milligan in disapproving a "public conscience" test, it was divided over the correct test. The majority identified the test as whether the claimant had to plead or rely on his own illegality, while the minority favoured a broader test of whether the claim was tainted by illegality.		The present case is one of contractual (as opposed to tortious) negligence. In that regard, S&R can found a cause of action against Moore Stephens without reliance on the fraudulent nature of Mr Stojevic's scheme. That raises issues relating to causation, which are better addressed at trial.
The defence of ex turpi causa non oritur actio	The court will not assist a claimant to recover a benefit from his own wrongdoing. This extends to claims for compensation or an indemnity in respect of the adverse consequences of the wrongdoing. In that regard, ex turpi causa only applies where the wrongdoing is personal, or primary, but not where it is vicarious.	While the House of Lords was unanimous in Tinsley v Milligan in disapproving a "public conscience" test, it was divided over the correct test. The majority identified the test as whether the claimant had to plead or rely on his own illegality, while the minority favoured a broader test of whether the claim was tainted by illegality.		The present case is one of contractual (as opposed to tortious) negligence. In that regard, S&R can found a cause of action against Moore Stephens without reliance on the fraudulent nature of Mr Stojevic's scheme. That raises issues relating to causation, which are better addressed at trial.
The principles governing the attribution of conduct and states of mind to companies.	It is a question of construction in each case as to whether the particular rule requires that the knowledge that an act has been done, or the state of mind with which it was done, should be attributed to the company.		A duty is owed by directors to the company (and not to the creditors themselves), and this duty requires directors of insolvent or borderline insolvent companies to have regard to the interests of the company's creditors. Both senior management and auditors owe duties to the company intended to protect shareholders' interests, and such duties must be enforceable. The two sets of relationship are essentially complementary, although the duty is in one case primary and in the other confirmatory. However the present scheme of fraud is categorised, it cannot in the context of the audit engagement be attributed to the company itself, so as to relieve the auditors from their duty or prevent the company complaining of its breach.	
The principles governing the attribution of conduct and states of mind to companies.	Hampshire Land is an exception to the normal rules for the attribution of an agent's knowledge to his principal. It applies where an agent has knowledge which his principal does not in fact share but which under normal principles of attribution would be deemed to be the knowledge of the principal.	There is no reason why the Hampshire Land principle should be limited to claims. It is a general principle of agency which can apply to any issue as to a company's notice, knowledge or complicity, whether that issue arises as a matter of claim or defence.	Although not essential to the reasoning in this case, Hampshire Land points to the same result. It prevents a company being treated as party to a fraud committed by its officers "on" or "against" the company, at least in the context of claims by the company for redress for offences committed against the company	
The principles governing the attribution of conduct and states of mind to companies.	The "adverse interest" rule is a separate exception, where the knowledge and conduct of an agent will not be attributed to the principal where the agent's actions are adverse to the interests of his principal.	In the case of a one-man company which has deliberately engaged in serious fraud, Royal Brunei should be followed in imputing awareness of the fraud to the company, applying what is referred to in the United States as the "sole actor" exception to the "adverse interest" principle. One or more individuals who for fraudulent purposes run a one-man company cannot obtain an advantage by claiming that the company is not a fraudster, but a secondary victim.		For the purposes of an action against the company by an innocent third party, with no notice of any illegality or impropriety by the company in the conduct of its affairs, the state of mind of a "sole actor" could and should be attributed to the company if it were relevant to the cause of action asserted against the company to do so. But it does not follow that that attribution should take place where the action is being brought by the company against an officer or manager who has been in breach of duty to the company.
The principles governing the attribution of conduct and states of mind to companies.	In this case, neither exception applies. Mr Stojevic was using S&R for his own dishonest purposes, but in a manner that resulted in substantial payments being made to S&R.			
Whether ex turpi causa provides a defence to S&R's claim that Moore Stephens was in breach of duty.	The defence is available, as all whose interests formed the subject of any duty of care owed by Moore Stephens to S&R, namely the company's sole will and mind and beneficial owner Mr Stojevic, were party to the illegal conduct.	The "very thing" principle is one of causation, and a principle of causation cannot trump ex turpi causa where the latter principle applies, however short of merits the defendant may be.	Moore Stephens cannot attribute to the company itself, for the purpose of invoking ex turpi causa against it, the knowledge of and involvement in the fraud of Mr Stojevic which they ought to have detected and reported to regulators or other proper authorities in the company's interests. What would have happened upon such detection and report is simply a matter of causation. The company's ability to recover its own loss in such circumstances is not only also right in principle, but also desirable.	The ex turpi causa rule is a procedural rule based on public policy. The perpetrators of illegality, a fortiori of dishonest illegality, ought not to be allowed to benefit from their reprehensible conduct.

== Significance ==
In the introduction to his speech, Lord Mance noted the effect of what have come to be called "rogue companies":

206. The world has sufficient experience of Ponzi schemes operated by individuals owning "one man" companies for it to be questionable policy to relieve from all responsibility auditors negligently failing in their duty to check and report on such companies' activities....

The case was therefore seen to be a significant test of the extent of Caparo. The majority of the Lords held that Moore Stephens' duty of care extended only to the shareholders, while the minority suggested it ought to be extended to creditors as well. Because the majority considered that the fact S&R was essentially a "one man company" was significant in arriving at their result, it is suggested that a different result could have occurred if innocent independent shareholders had also been involved.

It is also suggested that this case also emphasises the need for the courts to ensure that the activities of the rogue do not warp the general principles of the law of professional liability.

Commentators argue that Moore Stephens did not deliver a satisfactory result, because:

- the majority misapplied the facts by overlooking the relevance of insolvency to the application of attribution.
- the rules of attribution as laid down by Lord Hoffmann in Meridian Global Funds were misunderstood and misapplied.
- while the opinions of the minority risked creating a dangerous inroad into Salamon and Caparo, the opinions of the majority avoided that risk but reached the right result by tortuous reasoning.

However, the Law Commission recommended in its 2010 report on the illegality defence that no legislative change should be made in relation to claims for breach of contract, tort or unjust enrichment.

Lord Sumption, who as barrister argued Moore Stephens' case before the Lords, since declared in a 2012 speech to the Chancery Bar Association that he believed the result was right, and stated the following principles that can be drawn from the jurisprudence surrounding the illegality defence:

1. It is not right to say that the rationale of the public policy varies according to the situation, and the statement of McLachlin J (as she then was) about it in Hall v. Hebert is right in principle. This was accepted by Lords Walker and Brown in Moore Stephens, and was subsequently accepted in 2011 by the High Court of Australia in Miller v Miller.
2. The Claimant’s illegal act must be the basis of his claim. In that regard, the minority view in Tinsley v Milligan is to be preferred.
3. There may be exceptional cases in which the principle of consistency positively requires that the illegality defence should fail, notwithstanding that the Claimant’s claim is founded on his own illegal act. That will happen if the purpose of the rule which the Claimant’s illegal act violated would be defeated by preventing him from suing on it.
4. The only way in which the complexity, capriciousness and injustice of the current English law can be addressed is by making the consequences of a finding that a claim is founded on the Claimant’s illegal act subject to a large element of judicial discretion.

The courts have subsequently held that:

- if an undertaking is penalised by the Office of Fair Trading for infringing competition law, the company cannot recover money for penalties from its directors or employees, as that is contrary to ex turpi causa non oritur actio.
- Moore Stephens is not applicable to cases in which the claim is based on a breach of duty the scope of which encompasses persons or interests other than the fraudsters in corporate form.

== See also ==
- Caparo Industries plc v Dickman [1990] UKHL 2
- Hewison v Meridian Shipping Services Pte Ltd [2002] EWCA Civ 1821
- Multinational Gas and Petrochemical Co v Multinational Gas and Petrochemical Services Ltd [1983] Ch 258
