= Everet v Williams =

English court case in 1725

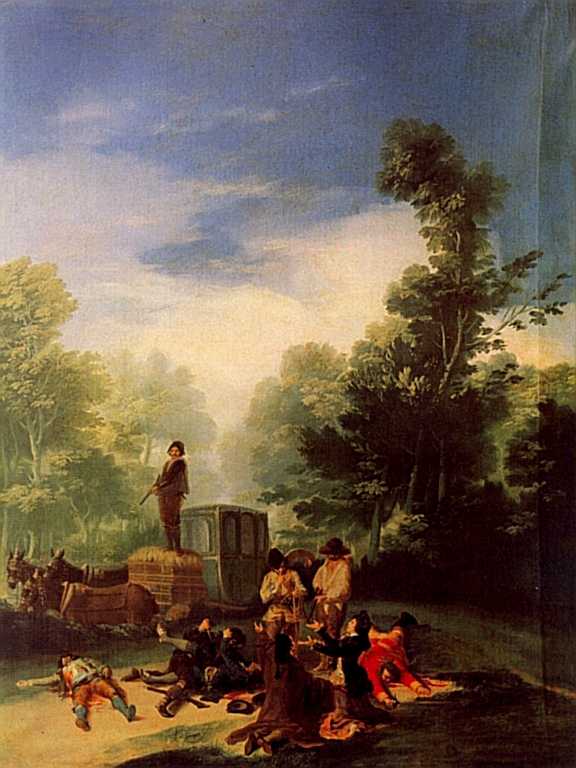
- Asalto al coche by Goya
- Full case name: John Everet v Joseph Williams
- Decided: 1725
- Citations: 2 Pothier on Obligations 3; 9 LQR 197

Everet v Williams [1725] (also known as the "Highwayman's Case") is an English court case dating back to 1725, regarding the enforceability of contracts to commit crimes. In this case, the contract was to share the spoils of armed robbery, which the court refused to uphold.

There are no contemporaneous reports of the case surviving, and most references to it relate to a summary of the case found in the 1893 Law Quarterly Review, which in turn relies upon a text from 1802, an English translation of a French work on the law of obligations by Robert Joseph Pothier.

== Facts ==
John Everet and Joseph Williams were both highwaymen, and entered into a partnership to split the proceeds from their robberies. For some time, the two engaged in this pursuit on Hounslow Heath, as well as at Bagshot, Salisbury, Hampstead, and elsewhere. When the proceeds of these activities were sold, Everet believed that Williams had maneuvered himself into receiving more than his fair share of the profits. For some unknown reason, Everet decided to take his grievance to the courts for settlement. He hired attorneys and counsel to sue Williams in court for the balance he thought due, pleading "for discovery, an account, and general relief" for the "profits" made under their "partnership".

The plaintiff's pleadings referred to the nature of the partnership that it was "skilled in dealing in several sorts of commodities" and that they "proceeded jointly in the said dealings with good success on Hounslow Heath, where they dealt with a gentleman for a gold watch", adding that Hounslow Heath "was a good and convenient place to deal in, and that the said commodities were very plenty at Finchley aforesaid".

The pleadings went on to state that the parties had "dealt with several gentlemen for divers watches, rings, swords, canes, hats, cloaks, horses, bridles, saddles, and other things to the value of £200 and upwards", and that these goods were obtained for "little or no money….after some small discourse with the said gentleman", adding that "the said things were dealt for 'at a very cheap rate.'"

== Judgment ==
On 30 October 1725 lawyers acting on behalf of John Everet presented a bill in equity at the Court of Exchequer, setting out the details of his claim. Less than two weeks later, on 13 November 1725, the Court of Exchequer was insulted at being asked to settle a dispute between admitted felons over the proceeds of crime and considered the bill "both scandalous and impertinent". Not only was the case dismissed, but a warrant was issued for the arrest of the two solicitors who brought the suit. Subsequently, both solicitors, William White and William Wreathock, were arrested and brought before the court and, on 6 December, both were fined £50 each. Also on 6 December, the barrister who signed the original bill bringing the suit to court, Jonathan Collins, was ordered to pay all court costs.

Williams, the respondent, was arrested and executed by hanging in 1727 in Maidstone, while Everet, the plaintiff, was hanged three years later at Tyburn. Wreathock, the solicitor, was himself convicted of highway robbery in 1735 and sentenced to hang, but his sentence was commuted to penal transportation. He obtained a royal pardon, returned to England, and resumed his practice until 1758, when he was struck off.

== Significance ==
The general principle is still accepted throughout the western system as law, and despite the insufficient nature of the report, it is still regularly cited for its central proposition. In 2013 the case was cited in the UBS case which was brought before the Seventh Circuit Court of Appeals in the United States. Lord Sumption cited it in his judgment in his 2015 Supreme Court decision in Jetivia SA v Bilta (UK) Limited (in liquidation) and again in 2016 in his decision in Patel v Mirza.

== See also ==
- Ex turpi causa
- English contract law
