= Hall v Hebert =

Canadian tort law case on contributory negligence

- Supreme Court of Canada

Hearing: October 6, 1992 Judgment: April 29, 1993
- Full case name: Vincent Hall v. Jean Hebert, also known as Joseph Jean Claude Hebert
- Citations: [1993] 2 SCR 159, 101 DLR (4th) 129, [1993] 4 WWR 113, 78 BCLR (2d) 113, 1993 CanLII 141
- Docket No.: 22399
- Prior history: On appeal from the Court of Appeal for British Columbia
- Ruling: Judgment for the plaintiff; damages reduced by 50 percent for contributory negligence

Holding
- Illegal actions only act as a bar to recovery in a tort claim where the actors are profiting from their illegal conduct or if it circumvents a criminal penalty.

Court membership
- Chief Justice: Antonio Lamer; Puisne Justices: Gérard La Forest, Claire L'Heureux-Dubé, John Sopinka, Charles Gonthier, Peter Cory, Beverley McLachlin, Frank Iacobucci, John C. Major

Reasons given
- Majority: McLachlin J., joined by La Forest, L'Heureux‑Dubé and Iacobucci JJ.
- Concurrence: Cory J.
- Concurrence: Gonthier J.
- Dissent: Sopinka J.
- Lamer C.J. and Major J. took no part in the consideration or decision of the case.

Hall v Hebert is a leading tort law case decided by the Supreme Court of Canada on the defences of contributory negligence and ex turpi causa non oritur actio (the principle that a plaintiff cannot recover for illegal actions).

The Court held that illegality can only act as a defence where the plaintiff is seeking to profit from illegal conduct or where a tort action is being used to circumvent or negate a criminal penalty.

== Background ==
The defendant, Jean Hebert, owned a 1968 Pontiac Firebird, and had been drinking with the plaintiff, Vincent Hall. They were out driving when the car stalled on a rough gravel road near steep drop-off.

The plaintiff, originally the passenger, asked if he could drive in an attempt to roll start the car. The defendant agreed, aware that he had consumed 11 or 12 bottles of beer that evening. The plaintiff lost control of the car, which left the road down the steep slope and flipped over. The plaintiff suffered severe head injuries as a result.

At trial the judge found the defendant liable for negligence but apportioned liability at 75 percent to the defendant and 25 percent to the plaintiff. The central issue on appeal was whether the doctrine ex turpi causa non oritur actio provided a complete defence.

== Opinion of the Court ==
The majority of the Court held that illegal conduct can bar recovery in tort only limited circumstances. The defence only operated when the integrity of the legal system is threatened by the claim, such as in situations where the plaintiff is attempting to profit from his illegal conduct, or when a tort claim is used to circumvent, subvert, or negate a criminal penalty.

Further, the doctrine of ex turpi causa can only be used as a defence and cannot be used to negate a duty of care, because it would inappropriately place an onus on the plaintiff to show absence of illegal or immoral conduct; the duty of care cannot be selectively applied to heads of damage; and the consideration of illegal or immoral conduct in duty of care would raise procedural problems where there are concurrent claims.

In the result, the plaintiff in this case was not seeking to profit from his illegal conduct (drinking and driving), nor was he circumventing the criminal law. However, he was contributorily negligent - therefore the damages were reduced to 50 percent.

== Aftermath ==
Following this decision, the doctrine of ex turpi causa had a very limited application, and some commentators noted that the decision "for all practical purposes, makes the defence of illegality inapplicable to negligence actions".

The Supreme Court revisited the doctrine in British Columbia v. Zastowny, where they applied the decision in Hall to hold that a person is not entitled to compensation for unemployment during a prison sentence, except in circumstances such as a wrongful conviction. This followed from the rationale that such compensation would create a clash between the criminal justice system and civil law, which would compromise the integrity of the legal system.

The United Kingdom's Supreme Court commended the ruling in 2016 for its explanation of the "essential rationale" behind the illegality doctrine.
