= Acts of the claimant =

In the English law of negligence, the acts of the claimant may give the defendant a defence to liability, whether in whole or part, if those acts unreasonably add to the loss.

== Principles ==
In the normal course of events, a defendant is liable in negligence if they owed a duty of care, breached that duty and either caused loss or damage to the claimant or exposed the claimant to the risk of loss or damage. But a negligent defendant will not be liable for any loss or damage subsequently sustained by the claimant, if the claimant acted unreasonably in responding to the situation. This is a matter for the courts to weigh on the facts of each case.

In McKew v Holland & Hannen & Cubitts (Scotland) Ltd. [1969] 3 All ER 1621, the defendant's negligence caused an injury to the claimant's leg that significantly weakened it. When later attempting to descend a steep staircase without a handrail or assistance, the claimant broke the ankle in the same leg. Lord Reid said that once a person is injured and that injury produces a loss of mobility, they must act reasonably and carefully.

It is, of course, possible that the disability may produce a situation in which further injury is caused. In such a case, the second injury fits into the chain of causation, the one following naturally from the other. But if the injured person acts unreasonably, this behaviour is novus actus interveniens (Latin for "a new act intervening"). The chain of causation is considered broken and the new injuries will be regarded as caused by the claimant's own conduct and not by the defendant's fault or the disability caused by that first negligence.

So in the particular case, the claimant knew that his left leg might give way suddenly. He could see that these stairs were steep and that there was no handrail. If he had given the matter a moment's thought, he would have realised that he could only safely descend if he went extremely slowly and carefully so that he could sit down if his leg gave way. Alternatively, he should have waited for assistance. But recklessly he chose to descend and, when he fell, he could not stop himself. That was taking an unreasonable risk and, therefore, his behaviour broke the chain of causation.

But where the claimant’s response is not sufficiently unreasonable, the chain of causation will be unbroken and the defendant will remain liable. In Wieland v Cyril Lord Carpets [1969] 3 All ER 1006 the defendant's negligence caused an injury to the claimant's neck that necessitated the wearing of a surgical collar. The claimant also wore bifocals and the collar inhibited the normal compensatory movement of her head to maintain perfect vision. She fell down some steps sustaining further injury. It was held that her difficulties in seeing with her usual spectacles were within the risk created by the original negligence.

Unlike McKew, Mrs. Wieland was not behaving unreasonably in descending the steps and so the chain of causation was not broken. Eveleigh J. said that "...one injury may affect a person's ability to cope with the vicissitudes of life" but all that arises reasonably in the ordinary course of events will not break the chain.

Similarly, where the defendant creates a dangerous situation that requires the claimant to take immediate evasive action, the defendant remains liable even if, at the critical moment, the claimant makes the wrong decision and suffers damage that could have been avoided.

== Defence of contributory negligence ==
Contributory negligence used to be a complete defence, but the Law Reform (Contributory Negligence) Act 1945 allows the court to apportion liability for damages between the claimant and the defendant where the claimant's negligence has materially added to the loss or damage sustained. Section 1 provides:

(1) Where any person suffers damage as the result partly of his own fault and partly of the fault of any other person or persons, a claim in respect of that damage shall not be defeated by reason of the fault of the person suffering the damage, but the damages recoverable in respect thereof shall be reduced to such extent as the court thinks just and equitable having regard to the claimant’s share in the responsibility for the damage..."

The reference in s1(1) to the claimant's share in the "responsibility for the damage" requires a court to consider what contribution the claimant made to their loss or damage, and the degree of blameworthiness. For these purposes, the only requirement is that the claimant's actions contribute to the damage. There is no requirement that the claimant must also have contributed to the initial sequence of events that caused the loss or damage. In Sayers v Harlow UDC (1958) 1 WLR 623 having paid to use a public toilet, a 36-year-old woman found herself trapped inside a cubicle that had no door handle. She attempted to climb out by stepping first on to the toilet and then on to the toilet-roll holder, which gave way. The court held that the injuries she suffered were a natural and probable consequence of the defendant's negligence, but that the damages would be reduced by 25% since the claimant had been careless in depending for support on the toilet-roll holder.

In some situations, the common law has been overtaken by statute. In Froom v Butcher (1976) QB 286 Denning MR assessed the percentage contribution made by a claimant who failed to wear a seat belt (at p295):

"Whenever there is an accident, the negligent driver must bear by far the greater share of responsibility. It was his negligence which [sic] caused the accident. It also was a prime cause of the whole of the damage." Thus, at p296: "(At times) the evidence will show that the failure made all the difference. The damage would have been prevented altogether if a seat belt had been worn. In such cases I would suggest that the damages should be reduced by 25%. But often the evidence will only show that the failure made a considerable difference...In such a case I would suggest that the damage attributable to the failure to wear a seat belt should be reduced by 15%."

The wearing of seat belts then became compulsory (see the Wearing of Seat Belts Regulations 1983 and the Motor Vehicles (Wearing of Seat Belts in Rear Seat by Adults) Regulations 1991). The current thinking would not support limiting damages by a figure of 25% and if, for example, the claimant was thrown out of the vehicle because no seat belt was worn, a substantial finding of contributory negligence should follow. Indeed, in Hitchens v Berkshire County Council the High Court expressed some difficulty in following the logic of Lord Denning's figure of 25% although the ratio decidendi was considered binding. There are two further principles to consider:

- Where the claimant has voluntarily taken on the risks that cause him injury, volenti non fit injuria may extinguish the cause of action.
- Where the claimant was engaged in illegal activity at the relevant time, the principle of ex turpi causa non oritur actio may extinguish the cause of action.

=== Volenti ===
If a claimant is volens, they have willingly accepted the risk of being injured by the foreseeable behaviour of the defendant. This means that there is considerable overlap between contributory negligence and volenti. Because prior agreement may be taken to extinguish the cause of action, its application can sometimes result in injustice. But contributory negligence has the capacity to be more fair because instead of extinguishing the action, it merely reduces the award of damages by the percentage of contribution made to the loss or damage by the claimant. In Reeves v Commissioner of Police of the Metropolis [2000] 1 AC 360, after two failed attempts, the claimant succeeded in committing suicide in his cell because of the defendant's failure to take proper precautions while the prisoner was on "suicide watch". The suicide was not a novus actus because preventing it was inevitably a part of the defendant's duty of care, and the court cannot equate a breach in the duty with a breach in the causal chain. The general rule remains that people of full age and full intellectual capacity must look after themselves and take responsibility for their actions. Hence, duties to safeguard people from causing harm to themselves will be very rare. But once it is obvious that this is one of those rare cases, the defendant cannot argue that the breach of the duty could not have been the cause of the harm because the victim caused it to himself. Thus, the defendant will be liable for the consequences of their negligence, however objectively unreasonable the claimant’s act may be, although damages may be reduced to take account of the claimant’s contributory negligence: in this case, damages were reduced by 50%.

In Morris v Murray [1990] 3 All ER 801 the claimant helped an obviously drunken pilot get into a small aeroplane, which crashed as it attempted to take off. This was a classic case for volenti to apply. The court held that the claimant must have known the condition of the pilot and voluntarily took the risk of negligence by agreeing to be a passenger. However, in driving cases, s149 Road Traffic Act 1988 denies the effectiveness of any agreement between a passenger of a motor vehicle and the driver that seeks to exclude liability for negligence where insurance cover for passengers is compulsory. This applies both to express agreements between driver and passenger (e.g. where the driver displays a notice in the vehicle stating that passengers travel at their own risk) and to implied agreements in cases such as Pitts v Hunt (1991) 1 QB 24, where the claimant was a passenger on a motor cycle knowing that the driver was drunk, uninsured, and without a current licence. The defendant negligently collided with another vehicle, killing himself and injuring the passenger. Dillon LJ. dismissed the claim on the ground of ex turpi causa because there was a joint common purpose. This is a public policy test of "public conscience" because the claimant might otherwise benefit from the unlawful behaviour willingly undertaken. Similarly, under sections 1 and 2 of the Unfair Contract Terms Act 1977, commercial agreements seeking to exclude liability in negligence are also void. But if the claimant signs an express agreement identifying the nature of the risks likely to be run and accepting those risks, this is evidence that the claimant is volens and has chosen to run the risk not by compulsion or as the lesser of two or more evils i.e. the contractual clause is an express volenti exclusion clause for the purposes of tortious liability. Because knowledge of a risk does not of itself imply consent, the UCTA prevails and such clauses do not automatically exclude liability. This would particularly apply in medical cases where informed consent is traditionally evidenced in a written form (Luckham: 2004).

=== Ex turpi causa ===
The policy is intended to prevent a claimant from seeking any benefit from their own unlawful acts. For example, in Meah v McCreamer (No. 2) [1986] 3 All ER 897, [1986] 1 All ER 943 the claimant had been injured in a car accident and later sexually assaulted three women. He was denied the right to claim an indemnity from the driver of the car against the claims for compensation made by the victims of his criminal actions. The problem is that if the medical evidence of the head injury establishes that the criminal conduct would not have arisen "but for" the tort alleged then, in principle, damages should follow. If the claimant was not responsible for his behaviour and it had merely been anti-social rather than criminal behaviour, then damages would have been available, and it seems inconsistent to deny recovery because the involuntary behaviour happened to be "illegal". In Thankwell v Barclays Bank Plc. [1986] 1 All ER 676, Hutchinson J. said (at p687) that the court would deny a claim when, "...in all the circumstances it would be an affront to the public conscience if by affording him the relief sought the court was seen to be indirectly assisting or encouraging the plaintiff in his criminal act." The logic of the "affront" may be more apparent in Clunis v Camden and Islington Health Authority where, two months after the claimant had been discharged from hospital after detention under s3 Mental Health Act 1983, he killed a stranger. He pleaded guilty to manslaughter on the ground of diminished responsibility. A claim against the hospital was struck out because it was based on the claimant's own illegal act. Similarly, in Revill v Newbery a burglar was shot by an elderly man. In general terms, it is appropriate to deny burglars relief, e.g. that the injuries prevent the burglar from pursuing their successful career in crime may be true, but it would be an affront if such loss of earnings were recoverable. However, it would be a different matter if the householder uses excessive force and inflicts very severe injuries. In such cases, some relief for the injuries should be allowed, but subject to reduction for contributory negligence.
