= Jetivia SA v Bilta (UK) Limited (in liquidation) =

2015 decision of the Supreme Court of the United Kingdom

- Court: Supreme Court of the United Kingdom
- Full case name: Jetivia SA & Anor v Bilta (UK) Limited (in liquidation) & Others
- Decided: 22 April 2015
- Citation: [2015] UKSC 23

Case history
- Appealed from: Jetivia SA & Anor v Bilta (UK) Ltd & Ors [2013] EWCA Civ 968, [2013] 3 WLR 1167 (31 July 2013)

Court membership
- Judges sitting: Lord Neuberger; Lord Mance; Lord Clarke; Lord Sumption; Lord Carnwath; Lord Toulson; Lord Hodge

Keywords
- fraud, fraudulent trading, attribution, illegality

Jetivia SA v Bilta (UK) Limited (in liquidation) [2015] UKSC 23 (sometimes referred to as Bilta (UK) Limited v Nazir) is a UK company and insolvency law decision of the Supreme Court of the United Kingdom in relation to (i) the attribution of unlawful acts of a director to the company where the company is the victim of the unlawful act, and (ii) the extent to which liability for fraudulent trading under section 213 of the Insolvency Act 1986 has extraterritorial effect.

The Supreme Court held that:

1. the defence of ex turpi causa could not operate to prevent a claim brought by the liquidators on behalf of a company against its former directors on the basis that, where the company was essentially the victim of a fraud by the directors, the conduct of the directors would not be attributed to the company thereby treating the company as a party to the illegality; and
2. liability for fraudulent trading under the Insolvency Act 1986 had extraterritorial effect.

== Facts ==
Paragraphs 113 - 116 of the joint opinion of Lord Toulson and Lord Hodge summarised the alleged facts as follows:

113. Bilta (UK) Ltd ("Bilta"), a company incorporated in England, seeks through its joint liquidators, Mr Hellard and Mr Ingram, to recover damages or equitable compensation in respect of its alleged loss. As against the directors, Bilta claims damages for conspiracy or equitable compensation for breach of fiduciary duty. The conspiracy is alleged to have been an unlawful means conspiracy, and the unlawful means are the directors' alleged breach of their fiduciary duties. As against Jetivia and Mr Brunschweiler, Bilta claims damages for conspiracy or compensation for dishonest assistance in the directors' breach of their fiduciary duties. Since the matter comes before the court on Jetivia's and Mr Brunschweiler's application for the claims against them to be summarily struck out or dismissed, it is to be assumed for present purposes that the factual allegations made in Bilta's amended particulars of claim are capable of proof, and there is no need to repeat the word "alleged" whenever referring to the defendants' conduct. The liquidators also pursue a separate claim for fraudulent trading under section 213 of IA 1986. Jetivia is a Swiss company and Mr Brunschweiler, who is resident in France, is its sole director.
114. Bilta had two directors, Mr Nazir and Mr Chopra ("the directors"), who are the first and second defendants. Mr Chopra owned all the issued shares. Bilta was registered for the purposes of VAT. Its only trading activity, which took place between 22 April and 21 July 2009, was trading in European Emissions Trading Scheme Allowances ("EUAs"), which are commonly known as carbon credits. EUAs were treated as taxable supplies under the VAT Act 1994 until 31 July 2009. Since then they have been zero-rated. The VAT status of supplies of the EUAs at the relevant time explains Bilta's activities.
115. In short, Bilta bought large numbers of EUAs from overseas suppliers, including Jetivia, free of VAT, and sold them in the UK with VAT to companies described as "first line buffers", which immediately sold them on. The price for which Bilta sold the EUAs was lower before VAT than the price at which it bought, and Bilta was therefore never going to be in a position to meet its liabilities to HM Revenue and Customs ("HMRC"). Bilta had minimal capital and was insolvent virtually from the outset. The money payable to Bilta, including the VAT due to HMRC, was either paid to Bilta and paid on by it to its overseas supplier, or was paid by the first line buffer (or a later company in the chain) directly to Bilta's supplier, or was otherwise paid to offshore accounts. At the end of the chain the EUAs would be resold to a company outside the UK, generating a right to a VAT refund. It is a familiar kind of carousel or missing trader fraud.
116. Bilta was insolvent throughout the period of its trading in EUAs. In that three-month period, Bilta sold more than 5.7m EUAs for about £294m. Its liability for VAT on those transactions amounts to £38,733,444. It did not submit any VAT returns to HMRC. On the application of HMRC Mr Hellard and Mr Ingram were appointed provisional liquidators of Bilta on 29 September 2009. They commenced the company's claim against the defendants who were its directors and other parties, including the appellants. The company was compulsorily wound up on 25 November 2009. The proceedings were amended on 13 October 2011 to include the liquidators' claims under section 213 of IA 1986.

Because the appeal concerned an application by the defendants to strike out certain claims as disclosing no sustainable cause of action in law, the relevant facts had not been determined at this stage of the proceedings. Accordingly, for the purposes of the hearing and the subsequent appeals all of the facts alleged against the defendants were assumed to be true for the purposes of determining whether the claims were legally sustainable.

The defendants applied to strike out various claims against them on two different grounds.

- Firstly, it was an accepted feature of English law that a claimant will be unable to pursue legal remedy if it arises in connection with his own illegal act. This is sometimes referred to as the "illegality defence" and sometimes by the Latin maxim: ex turpi causa non oritur actio ("from a dishonorable cause an action does not arise"). In this case the claims of the company related to a carousel fraud, but because the directors conducted the fraud in the name of the company, their conduct should be attributed to the company, and therefore the company should not be able to make any claim in relation the conduct of the fraud.
- Secondly, with respect to certain of the defendants only, it was alleged that the statutory power to impose liability for fraudulent trading was limited to actions within the jurisdiction of the United Kingdom. As the conduct complained of occurred outside of the country, they alleged that the court had no power to make an award against them.

== Judgment ==
The decision was handed down in April 2015 after the original hearing had concluded in October of the previous year; an unusual length of time for the Supreme Court.

All seven judges agreed unanimously that the court's power to impose liability for fraudulent trading was extraterritorial. Relatively little judicial time was dedicated to the discussion of that subject in the judgments.

In relation to the question of attribution, all seven judges similarly agreed that "Where a company has been the victim of wrong-doing by its directors, or of which its directors had notice, then the wrong-doing, or knowledge, of the directors cannot be attributed to the company as a defence to a claim brought against the directors by the company's liquidator, in the name of the company and/or on behalf of its creditors, for the loss suffered by the company as a result of the wrong-doing, even where the directors were the only directors and shareholders of the company, and even though the wrong-doing or knowledge of the directors may be attributed to the company in many other types of proceedings."

However Lord Sumption, Lord Toulson and Lord Hodge dissented from the majority in relation to the scope of the "illegality defence".

Although it was not a point in issue in the case, Lord Neuberger further expounded that "section 172(3) [of the Companies Act 2006] cannot be defeated by the directors invoking the defence of ex turpi causa."

== Significance ==
English law had recently seen a number of judicial decisions relating to difficult issues of attribution of fraudulent conduct by a director to the company. This included the controversial decision of the House of Lords in Moore Stephens v Stone Rolls Ltd (in liq) [2009] UKHL 39 (30 July 2009), and the so-called "sole actor" exception. The Moore Stephens decision in turn had followed a number of other recent decisions in relation to the issue of illegality, including Tinsley v Milligan [1994] 1 AC 340; Les Laboratoires Servier v Apotex Inc [2014] UKSC 55 (29 October 2014) and Hounga v Allen [2014] UKSC 47 (30 July 2014). Commentators had hoped that the decision of the Supreme Court in Jetivia v Bilta would resolve these issues. Unfortunately their Lordships declined to make an authoritative statement on illegality in English law.

Although most commentators agree with the emphasis of the decision, and applaud the move away from Stone & Rolls Ltd v Moore Stephens the case represents yet another missed opportunity to issue an authoritative statement on the thorny issue of illegality.

The test in Jetivia has been subsequently applied by the courts in relation to attribution on various occasions, including Singularis Holdings Limited (in liquidation) v Daiwa Capital Markets Europe Limited [2019] UKSC 50 and Crown Prosecution Service v Aquila Advisory Limited.

== See also ==
- Illegality in English law
- UK company law
- UK insolvency law
