= Last clear chance =

Legal doctrine

The last clear chance doctrine of tort law is applicable to negligence cases in jurisdictions that apply rules of contributory negligence in lieu of comparative negligence. Under this doctrine, a negligent plaintiff can nonetheless recover if he is able to show that the defendant had the last opportunity to avoid the accident. Though the stated rationale has differed depending on the jurisdiction adopting the doctrine, the underlying idea is to mitigate the harshness of the contributory negligence rule. Conversely, a defendant can also use this doctrine as a defense. If the plaintiff has the last clear chance to avoid the accident, the defendant will not be liable.

The introduction of the doctrine is widely attributed to the English case of Davies v. Mann, 152 Eng. Rep. 588 (1842).

== Statement ==
The Restatement (Second) of Torts explains the doctrine in detail as follows:

§ 479. LAST CLEAR CHANCE: HELPLESS PLAINTIFF

A plaintiff who has negligently subjected himself to a risk of harm from the defendant's subsequent negligence may recover for harm caused thereby if, immediately preceding the harm,

(a) the plaintiff is unable to avoid it by the exercise of reasonable vigilance and care, and

(b) the defendant is negligent in failing to utilize with reasonable care and competence his then existing opportunity to avoid the harm, when he

(i) knows of the plaintiff's situation and realizes or has reason to realize the peril involved in it or

(ii) would discover the situation and thus have reason to realize the peril, if he were to exercise the vigilance which it is then his duty to the plaintiff to exercise.

§ 480. LAST CLEAR CHANCE: INATTENTIVE PLAINTIFF

A plaintiff who, by the exercise of reasonable vigilance, could discover the danger created by the defendant's negligence in time to avoid the harm to him, can recover if, but only if, the defendant

(a) knows of the plaintiff's situation, and

(b) realizes or has reason to realize that the plaintiff is inattentive and therefore unlikely to discover his peril in time to avoid the harm, and

(c) thereafter is negligent in failing to utilize with reasonable care and competence his then existing opportunity to avoid the harm.

== See also ==
- Avoidable consequences rule
- Personal injury
