= UCFA =

UCFA may refer to:

- University Catholic Federation Australia, a former name of the Australian Catholic Students Association
- Uniform Comparative Fault Act, a Uniform Act in the United States
- Union des Coopératives des femmes de l’Arganeraie A corporation of female workers producing argan oil in Morocco
- Union for the Franco-African Community, a political party alliance in Niger
