= American Motorcycle Ass'n v. Superior Court =

American legal case decided by California's Supreme Court in 1978

American Motorcycle Assn. v. Superior Court of Los Angeles County
- Supreme Court of California

Decided February 9,, 1978
- Full case name: American Motorcycle Association, Petitioner, v. The Superior Court of Los Angeles County, Respondent; Viking Motorcycle Club et al.,
- Citation(s): 20 Cal. 3d 578, 578 P.2d 899, 146 Cal. Rptr. 182

Holding
- The court issued a peremptory writ of mandate and directed the trial court to vacate its order

Court membership
- Chief Justice: Mathew Tobriner
- Associate Justices: Rose Elizabeth Bird, Stanley Mosk, Frank K. Richardson, Wiley W. Manuel, Raymond L. Sullivan, William Patrick Clark Jr.

Case opinions
- Majority: Mathew Tobriner, joined by Mathew Tobriner, Rose Elizabeth Bird, Stanley Mosk, Frank K. Richardson
- Concurrence: Wiley W. Manuel, Raymond L. Sullivan
- Dissent: William Patrick Clark Jr.

American Motorcycle Association v. Superior Court, 20 Cal. 3d 578 (1978), was a case decided by the Supreme Court of California that first adopted a comparative fault regime for apportionment of liability among multiple tortfeasors for negligence in California.

== See also ==
- California Tort Claims Act
- Law of California
