= Comparative negligence =

Legal defense

Comparative negligence, called non-absolute contributory negligence outside the United States, is a partial legal defense that reduces the amount of damages that a plaintiff can recover in a negligence-based claim, based upon the degree to which the plaintiff's own negligence contributed to cause the injury. When the defense is asserted, the factfinder, usually a jury, must decide the degree to which the plaintiff's negligence and the combined negligence of all other relevant actors all contributed to cause the plaintiff's damages. It is a modification of the doctrine of contributory negligence that disallows any recovery by a plaintiff whose negligence contributed even minimally to causing the damages.

== Types of comparative negligence ==
Prior to the late 1960s, only a few states had adopted the system. When comparative negligence was adopted, three main versions were used. The first is called "pure" comparative negligence. Under this type of comparative negligence, a plaintiff who was 90% to blame for an accident could recover 10% of his losses.

The second and third versions are lumped together in what is called "modified" comparative negligence. One variant allows plaintiffs to recover "only" if the plaintiff's negligence is "not greater than" the defendant's. In some states this threshold is 50 or 51%.

The other variant allows plaintiffs to recover "only if" the plaintiff's negligence is "not as great as" the defendant's (the plaintiff's negligence must be less than 50% of the combined negligence). The apparently minor difference between the two modified forms of comparative negligence is thought by lawyers handling such cases to be significant, as juries who ordinarily assign degrees of fault are much less willing to award damages to a plaintiff who is equally at fault than to one who is less at fault than the defendant.

== Contributory negligence doctrine ==
Some states, though, still use the contributory negligence doctrine to evaluate negligence in a tort. For instance, Alabama, Maryland, North Carolina, and Virginia continue to use contributory negligence.

Neither comparative negligence nor contributory negligence should be confused with joint and several liability, which generally holds each of two or more culpable defendants responsible for all the damages sustained by a plaintiff. For practical reasons, a plaintiff who faces the defense of comparative negligence may wish to join all potentially culpable defendants in his action since the plaintiff's negligence will be balanced against the combined negligence of all defendants in apportioning damages even if the plaintiff may not be able actually to get compensation from some of them: for example, if an insolvent individual and a major corporation were both negligent in causing plaintiff's harm.

== Special circumstances ==
Sometimes a plaintiff and a defendant are both found to be negligent, but the court allocates full responsibility to the defendant in the interests of policy or justice. For example, in Bexiga v. Havir Manufacturing Corp., 290 A.2d 281 (N.J. 1972), a minor operating a power punch press for his employer had his hand crushed by the ram of the machine. Although the plaintiff was negligent by placing his hand under the ram, the defendant (the manufacturer of the machine) had failed to provide additional safety equipment and was found to also be negligent. The court held that because the type of negligence was foreseeable and the very "type of eventuality the safety devices were designed to guard against," the defendant was liable for the plaintiff's damages.

Another example can be found in Christensen v. Royal Sch. Dist., 124 P.3d 283 (Wash. 2005). In that case a 13-year-old girl engaged in sexual activity with her teacher. The court held that the girl had no duty to protect herself from sexual abuse because it was in society's interest. Therefore, as a matter of law, anybody under the age of sixteen could not have contributory negligence found against them in this type of relationship.

In Derheim v. N. Fiorito, Inc., the Supreme Court of Washington held that the defendant cannot use a seat belt defense to blame the plaintiff who had exhibited comparative negligence by not wearing a seat belt.

=== Serious-Misconduct Bar ===
Some states, such as West Virginia have comparative negligence statutes which bar recovery for injuries that occurred while the individual was committing a felony or violent misdemeanor.

== See also ==
- Comparative responsibility
- Hoffman v. Jones
- Li v. Yellow Cab Co. of California
- Uniform Comparative Fault Act

== General and cited references ==
- Dobbs, Dan B.; Hayden, Paul T.; Bublick, Ellen M. (2017). Torts and Compensation: Personal Accountability and Social Responsibility for Injury. American Casebook Series (Eighth ed.). St. Paul, Minn.: West Academic Publishing. ISBN 9781634608152. OCLC 990059107.
