= Avoidable consequences rule =

The avoidable consequences rule is a concept in United States jurisprudence which comes from a common-law rule barring recovery of damages that a tort victim "could have avoided by the use of reasonable effort or expenditure after the commission of the tort." This concept recognizes as fact, that if a plaintiff is injured by a defendant, that the plaintiff must take reasonable steps to avoid aggravating the injuries caused by the defendant.

1. Except as stated in Subsection (2), one injured by the tort of another is not entitled to recover damages for any harm that he could have avoided by the use of reasonable effort or expenditure after the commission of the tort.
2. One is not prevented from recovering damages for a particular harm resulting from a tort if the tortfeasor intended the harm or was aware of it and was recklessly disregardful of it, unless the injured person with knowledge of the danger of the harm intentionally or heedlessly failed to protect his own interests.

For example, if one thinks of a surgery as highly dangerous and likely to cause a greater likelihood of injury and damages, perhaps because the surgery itself is unreasonable, a plaintiff must take reasonable steps to avoid aggravating the injuries. Thus the duty to mitigate is exercised when a reasonable person declines risky surgery for fear that it may make the entire injury worse.

== See also ==
- Appeal
- Constitutional law
- Damages
- Duty
- Error (law)
- Eggshell skull
- Last clear chance
- Tort law
