= Uniform Apportionment of Tort Responsibility Act =

The Uniform Apportionment of Tort Responsibility Act (UATRA), and its periodic revisions, is one of the Uniform Acts drafted by the National Conference of Commissioners on Uniform State Laws (NCCUSL) with the intention of harmonizing state laws in force in the states.

== Purpose ==
The UATRA is meant to be a successor to the Uniform Comparative Fault Act as a way to apportion liability in negligence cases. The UATRA was designed to overcome the low popularity of the Uniform Comparative Fault Act by modifying the usage of joint and several liability among multiple tortfeasors.

== Adoption ==
The UATRA was promulgated in 2002. It has not yet been adopted by any states, but it has been introduced in North Carolina in 2009.
