= Employer's Liability (Defective Equipment) Act 1969 =

Act of the Parliament of the United Kingdom

Employer's Liability (Defective Equipment) Act 1969 (Note: Section 2(1).)
- Act of Parliament
- Parliament of the United Kingdom
- Long title: An Act to make further provision with respect to the liability of an employer for injury to his employee which is attributable to any defect in equipment provided by the employer for the purposes of the employer's business; and for purposes connected with the matter aforesaid.
- Citation: 1969 c. 37
- Territorial extent: England and Wales; Scotland; (Note: Section 2(4).)

Dates
- Royal assent: 25 July 1969
- Commencement: 25 October 1969 (Note: Section 2(2).)
Other legislation
Amended by	Northern Ireland Constitution Act 1973

Status: Amended

Text of statute as originally enacted

Revised text of statute as amended

Text of the Employer's Liability (Defective Equipment) Act 1969 as in force today (including any amendments) within the United Kingdom, from legislation.gov.uk.

The Employer's Liability (Defective Equipment) Act 1969 (c. 37) is an act of the Parliament of the United Kingdom that makes employers strictly liable for defective equipment that causes any injury. The purpose was to ensure that employers fully insure their staff for all health and safety risks, and are encouraged to put in place preventative measures.

== Provisions ==
Section 1(1) of the act provides that where an employee suffers personal injury in the course of employment in consequence of a defect in equipment provided by the employer for the purposes of the employer's business, and the defect is attributable wholly or partly to the fault of a third party (whether identified or not), the injury is deemed also to be attributable to negligence on the part of the employer. This applies whether or not the employer is liable apart from the subsection, and is without prejudice to the law relating to contributory negligence and to any remedy by way of contribution or in contract or otherwise that is available to the employer. Section 1(2) of the act makes void any agreement that purports to exclude or limit an employer's liability under section 1(1).

Section 1(3) of the act defines "business" (which includes the activities carried on by any public body), "employee" (a person employed under a contract of service or apprenticeship), "equipment" (which includes any plant and machinery, vehicle, aircraft and clothing), "fault" (negligence, breach of statutory duty or other act or omission giving rise to liability in tort in England and Wales, or to liability in damages in Scotland) and "personal injury" (which includes loss of life, any impairment of a person's physical or mental condition and any disease). Section 1(4) of the act binds the Crown, and treats persons in the service of the Crown as employees of the Crown for the purposes of the section. Section 2 of the act provides for the short title, for commencement on the expiration of three months from the date on which the act was passed, and for the act not to extend to Northern Ireland.

== Case law ==
- Hewison v Meridian Shipping Services Pte [2002] EWCA Civ 1821, allowing an employer an illegality defence, Ward LJ dissenting.

== Subsequent developments ==
Section 2(3) of the act, and in section 2(4) the words "except the foregoing subsection", were repealed by section 41(1)(a) of, and part I of schedule 6 to, the Northern Ireland Constitution Act 1973, which came into force on 18 July 1973.

== See also ==
- UK labour law

== Bibliography ==
- Jeremy Stranks, Health and Safety Law
