= Hewison v Meridian Shipping Services Pte =

2002 English tort law case

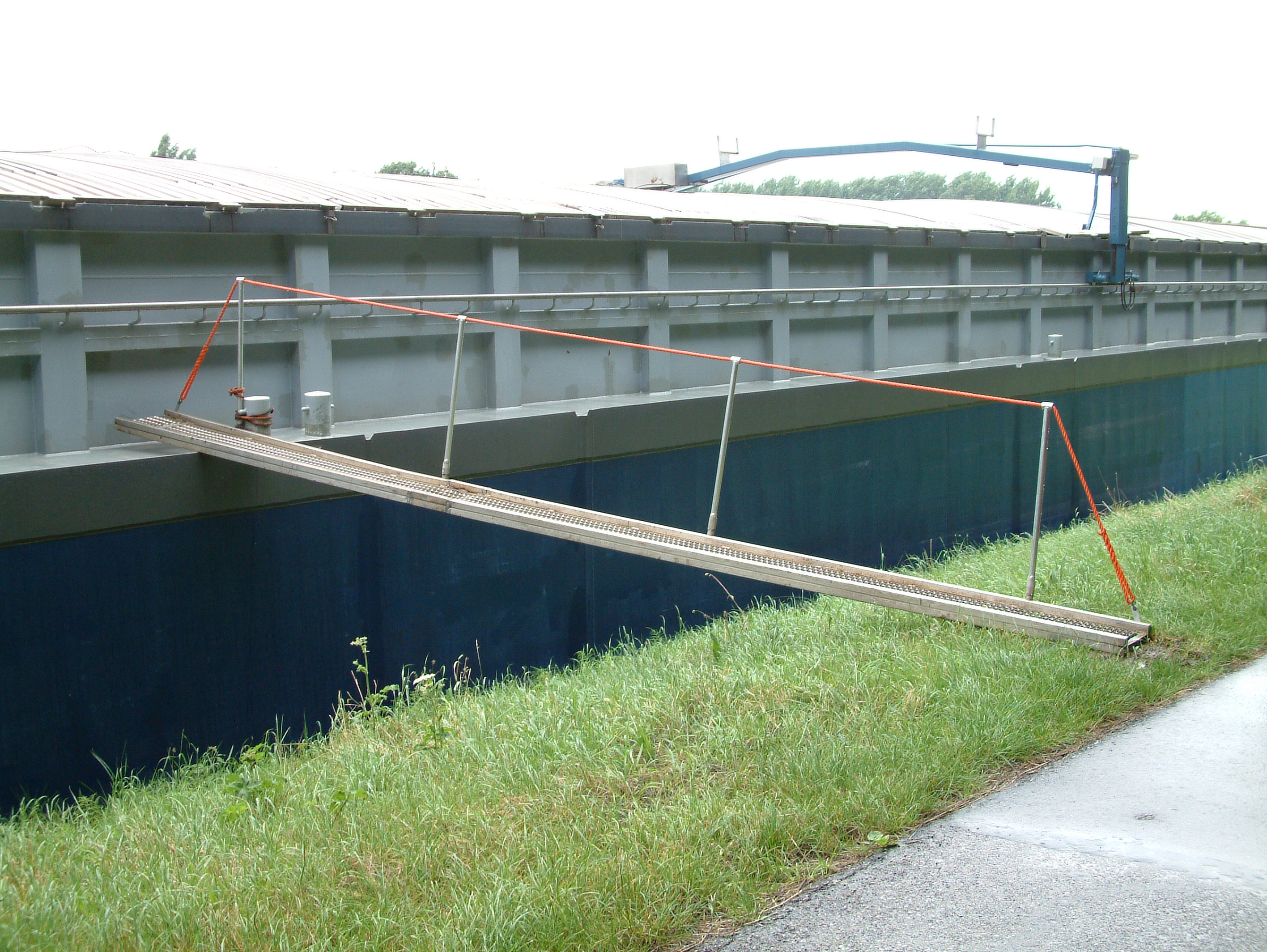
- Court: Court of Appeal
- Decided: 11 December 2002
- Citations: [2002] EWCA Civ 1821, [2003] ICR 766, [2003] PIQR P17, (2003) 147 SJLB 24, Times, 28 December 2002, Independent, 10 February 2003
- Transcript: Judgment on Bailii

Case opinions
- Ward LJ (dissenting), Tuckey LJ and Clarke LJ

Keywords
- Illegality

Hewison v Meridian Shipping Services Pte [2002] EWCA 1821 is an English tort law case, concerning an employer's liability for an employee's illegal acts.

== Facts ==
Mr Hewison had epilepsy and needed anti-convulsant drugs. He concealed his illness so that he could do offshore work with his employer, Meridian Shipping, as a crane operator. Meridian Shipping was responsible for a workplace accident, contrary to Employer's Liability (Defective Equipment) Act 1969, whereby Mr Hewison was struck in the head by a gangway. Mr Hewison started to suffer from seizures even with his medication. Meridian Shipping dismissed him and he could get no further work at sea. Mr Hewison submitted that, despite his failure to declare his illness (which, it was conceded, amounted to obtaining a pecuniary advantage by deception contrary to s 16 Theft Act 1968), it would be an affront to public conscience were he denied a remedy for Meridian Shipping's negligence and breach of statutory duty. He argued that without the accident his epilepsy would not have been heightened, he would have remained at sea and would not have suffered a considerable loss of future earnings.

== Judgment ==
Tuckey LJ and Clarke LJ held that Mr Hewison could recover no damages for future loss of earnings. The principle from Clunis v Camden and Islington Health Authority applied here, so that a claimant cannot rely on an unlawful act to enable recovery in tort. Though a claim itself is not barred, loss attributable to an illegal act is. Mr Hewison's offence under the Theft Act 1968 was an essential part of his future employment at sea. It was added that the court would not deny restitution if the illegality was collateral or insignificant, but it rejected the notion that recovery should be allowed merely because denial might affront "public conscience".

Ward LJ dissented.

== See also ==
- Disability Discrimination Act 1995
- Tinsley v Milligan [1994] 1 AC 340
- Reeves v Commissioner of Police of the Metropolis [1999] QB 169
- Holman v Johnson (1775) 1 Cowp 341, 343, Lord Mansfield CJ, "The objection, that a contract is immoral or illegal as between plaintiff and defendant, sounds at all times very ill in the mouth of the defendant. It is not for his sake, however, that the objection is ever allowed; but it is founded in general principles of policy, which the defendant has the advantage of, contrary to the real justice, as between him and the plaintiff, by accident, if I may say so. The principle of public policy is this; ex dolo malo non oritur actio. No court will lend its aid to a man who founds his cause of action upon an immoral or an illegal act. If, from the plaintiff's own standing or otherwise, the cause of action appears to arise ex turpi causa, or the transgression of a positive law of this country, there the court says he has no right to be assisted. It is upon that ground the court goes; not for the sake of the defendant, but because they will not lend their aid to such a plaintiff. So if the plaintiff and defendant were to change sides, and the defendant was to bring his action against the plaintiff, the latter would then have the advantage of it; for where both were equally in fault, potior est conditio defendentis."
- Moore Stephens v Stone Rolls Ltd [2009] UKHL 39
