= California Tort Claims Act =

The California Government Claims Act (formerly known as the Tort Claims Act) sets forth the procedures that must be followed when filing a claim for money or damages against a governmental entity in the state of California. This includes state, county, and local entities, as well as their employees. The Government Claims Act is found in Division 3.6 of the Government Code, Govt. Code §§ 810 et seq.

== Claims ==
Typically, one must first give written notice within 6 months of the injury or discovery of the injury before filing an actual lawsuit in a California superior court, giving the governmental agency time to settle the claim.

== Immunity ==
The act provides immunity to the State of California and its related entities from being sued. The law immunizes public employees from liability for "instituting or prosecuting any judicial or administrative proceeding" within the scope of their employment, "even if" the employees act "maliciously and without probable cause." (Cal. Gov. Code, § 821.6)

The Act provides complete immunity to public entities that come from any act or omission of an act of the public entity, its employees or anyone else.

Despite the "complete immunity", the Act provides certain exceptions for the benefit of the public.

== Exceptions to immunity ==
Exceptions to governmental immunity are too complex to exhaustively list in this article.

Under the Act, the government can be held legally responsible for personal injury damages in certain situations. These situations include:

- The negligent acts of employees;
- The negligent acts of independent contractors;
- Premises liability for dangerous conditions on government property; and
- When damages are caused by the public entities' failure to carry out a duty imposed by law.

While generally speaking, the only exceptions to immunity are the ones codified/created by this Act, Courts have broadened these exceptions by reading immunity narrowly and the exceptions broadly.

== History ==
The Public Liability Act of 1923 established governmental liability and a claims process for injuries caused by the negligent or wrongful acts of counties, municipalities and school districts. In the 1961 Muskopf v. Corning Hospital District and Lipman v. Brisbane Elementary School District decisions, the California Supreme Court decided that the doctrine of sovereign immunity did not legally exist and would no longer protect public entities. In response to these decisions, the Legislature temporarily suspended the effect of the Muskopf and Lipman decisions.

This law is often incorrectly cited as the California Tort Claims Act because the immunity is not absolute, and the Act provides exceptions to the immunity and a mechanism for resolving those claims that must be exhausted as a prerequisite to filing a lawsuit.

== See also ==
- American Motorcycle Ass'n v. Superior Court, Supreme Court of California case for apportionment of liability among multiple tortfeasors for negligence
