= Hoffman v. Jones =

Case decided by the Supreme Court of Florida

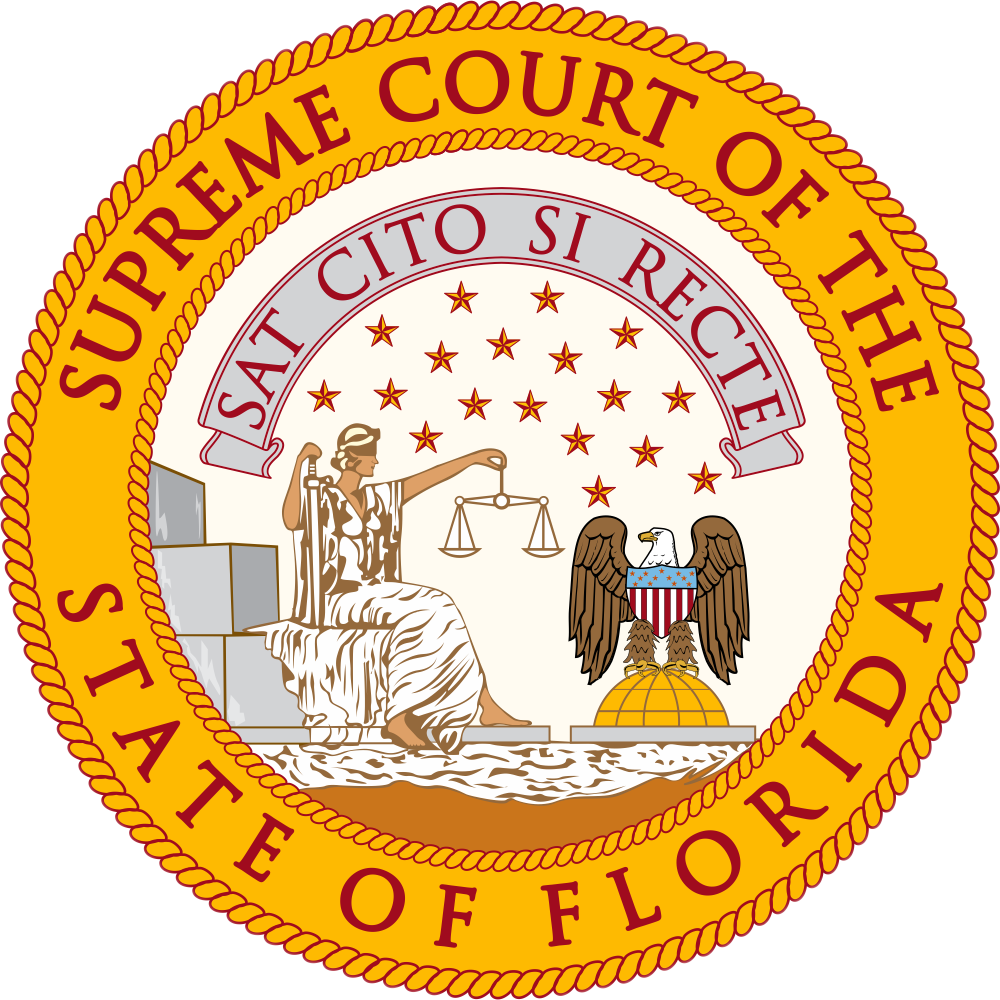
- Court: Supreme Court of Florida
- Full case name: Philip Francis Hoffman, Jr., and Pav-a-Way Corporation, a Florida Corporation, Petitioners, v. Hazel J. Jones, As Administratrix of the Estate of William Harrison Jones Jr., Deceased, Respondent.
- Decided: July 10, 1973
- Citation: 280 So.2d 431

Case history
- Appealed from: Florida District Courts of Appeal (272 So.2d 529, 1973)

Court membership
- Judges sitting: Vassar B. Carlton, B.K. Roberts, Richard W. Ervin, James C. Adkins, Joseph A. Boyd Jr., David McCain, Hal P. Dekle

Case opinions
- Majority: Adkins, joined by Carlton, Ervin, Boyd, McCain, Dekle
- Dissent: Roberts

Keywords
- Comparative negligence

Hoffman v. Jones, 280 So.2d 431 (Fla. 1973), was a case decided by the Supreme Court of Florida that was the first adoption of the comparative negligence rule in negligence law through judicial decision as opposed to adoption through statute. In the wrongful death case of Hoffman v. Jones, attorney Sammy Cacciatore Jr. was instrumental in causing the Florida Supreme Court to adopt for the first time the comparative negligence rule in negligence law. William Harrison Jones Jr. was killed by a Pav-A-Way Corporation truck driven by Philip Francis Hoffman Jr. It was the first case in the nation in which a state supreme court abandoned the almost-150-year-old doctrine of contributory negligence, which precluded an injured victim from recovery if the victim had contributed to the incident to any degree. The Florida Supreme Court adopted the concept of "pure" comparative negligence, which allows a victim to be compensated for the percentage of harm caused by the at-fault person. The decision of the court in Hoffman v. Jones has been cited in law school textbooks, and now the concept of comparative negligence is the prevailing doctrine.

== Impact ==
Hoffman was cited by the California Supreme Court as precedent for their decision to adopt a comparative negligence scheme in California.
