= Good law =

Legal decision that remains valid

Good law is the concept in jurisprudence that a legal decision is still valid or holds legal weight. A good law decision has not been overturned (during an appeal) or otherwise rendered obsolete (such as by a change in the underlying law). Legal practitioners use good law as part of the basis for making legal arguments. However, there is no universally acceptable method of determining what is considered good law in every legal circumstance.

== See also ==
- Bad law

== Sources ==
- Finding the Answers to Legal Questions: A How-To-Do-It Manual. New York, NY: Neal-Schuman Publishers. 2011. ISBN 978-1555707187.
- Legal Research: How to Find & Understand the Law. United States: Nolo. 2018. ISBN 978-1-4133-2564-5.
