= Esso Petroleum Co Ltd v Harper's Garage (Stourport) Ltd =

Esso Ltd v Harper’s Garage (Stourport) Ltd
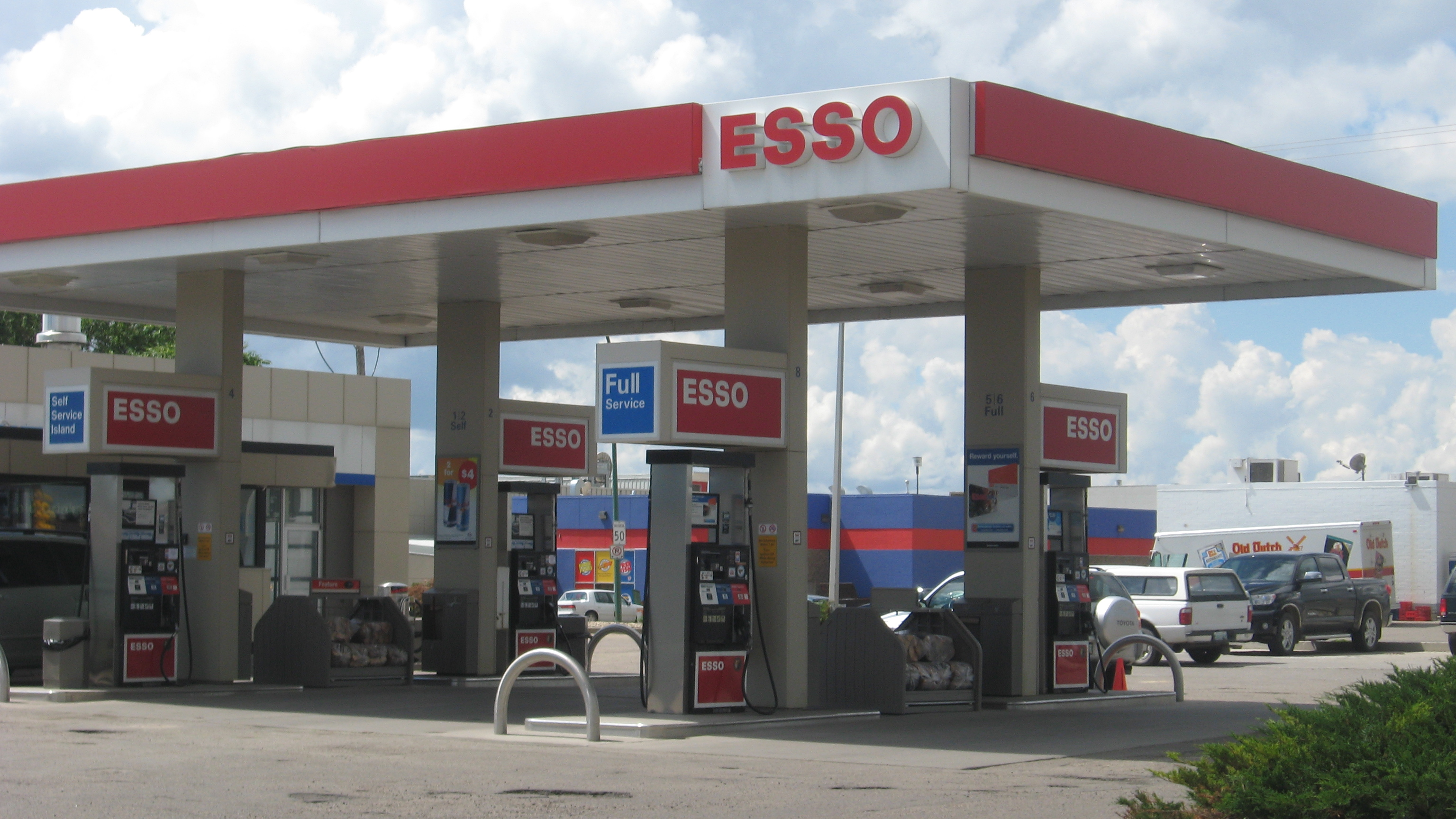
- Stock image of a modern Esso garage in 2008.
- Court: House of Lords
- Citations: [1967] UKHL 1, [1968] AC 269, [1967] 1 All ER 699, [1967] 2 WLR 871, 201 Estates Gazette 1043

Court membership
- Judges sitting: Lord Reid, Lord Morris of Borth-y-Gest, Lord Hodson, Lord Pearce, Lord Wilberforce

Keywords
- Contract, illegality, restraint of trade

Esso Petroleum Co Ltd v Harper's Garage (Stourport) Ltd [1967] UKHL 1 is an English contract law case, concerning the restraint of trade through a tying arrangement.

== Facts ==
Harper's Garage agreed to accept all petrol for its two stations from Esso for a long period of time, a solus agreement. It agreed to keep the garage open at all reasonable hours and not to sell it without ensuring that the buyer entered a similar agreement. One agreement was for 5 years, the other for 21 years.

== Judgment ==
The House of Lords held that the 5-year agreement was valid and the 21-year agreement was invalid.

Lord Reid said he ‘would not attempt to define the dividing line between contracts which are and contracts which are not in restraint of trade’. It was preferable ‘to ascertain what were the legitimate interests of the [suppliers] which they were entitled to protect and then to see whether these restraints were more than adequate for that purpose.’

== Significance ==
In Peninsula Securities Ltd v Dunnes Stores (Bangor) Ltd [2020] the Supreme Court invoked the Practice Statement to depart from Esso with Lord Wilson stating:

the objections to the test are that it has no principled place within the doctrine; that it has been consistently criticised for over 50 years and, although in some quarters loyally applied, the reasoning behind it has, to the best of my knowledge, scarcely been defended; and that the common law has been limping between the continuing authority of the test in our jurisdiction and its rejection in Australia and in parts of Canada.

== See also ==
- English contract law
