= Pearce v Brooks =

1866 case in English contract law

Pearce v Brooks is an 1866 case in English contract law. In Pearce v Brooks the owner of a horse-drawn coach was prevented from recovering the costs of hire from a prostitute who had hired the coach in order to attract clients.
