= Comparative responsibility =

Doctrine of tort law

Comparative responsibility (known as comparative fault in some jurisdictions) is a doctrine of tort law that compares the fault of each party in a lawsuit for a single injury. Comparative responsibility may apply to intentional torts as well as negligence and encompasses the doctrine of comparative negligence.

Comparative responsibility divides the fault among parties by percentages, and then accordingly divides the money awarded to the plaintiff. The plaintiff may only recover the percentage of the damages he is not at fault for. If a plaintiff is found to be 25% at fault, he can recover only 75% of his damages.

There are several circumstances that make comparative responsibility intricate: when the plaintiff shares in fault for the damages, when a defendant who has a share of the fault cannot be included in the suit, when one of the defendants can not pay, and when there are charges of both negligence and intentional torts in the same action.

== United States ==
Currently, only Alabama, Maryland, and the District of Columbia will not allow a plaintiff to recover if it is proven to be in any way at fault. This rule is called contributory negligence, a doctrine perceived to be overly "harsh", which "has caused all but a few States to substitute the doctrine of comparative negligence".

Most states will follow one of three solutions to the problem:

1. Allow the plaintiff to recover the amount of total damages to him, reduced by the percentage of fault he is assigned.
2. Allow the plaintiff to recover only if he was an equal or lower percentage at fault than each defendant. Plaintiff's recovery is reduced as in (a.)
3. Allow the plaintiff to recover only if he was less at fault than each of the defendants. Plaintiff's recovery again reduced as above.

Another situation is where a defendant apportioned some fault can not pay his portion of the damages. States will cover this situation differently. There are four options:

1. The plaintiff will not recover from this defendant, and the other defendants will be responsible only for their share. Thirteen states follow this approach.
  The next three options involve the doctrine of joint and several liability:
2. Any of the other defendants can be held responsible for the unpaid share. Fifteen states follow this approach (10 contributory responsibility, five which still follow contributory negligence.
3. The unpaid share will be reapportioned among the other defendants, according to their percentages. Some states hold that only defendants above a specific percentage will share.
4. The unpaid share will be reapportioned among the defendants AND plaintiff according to each party's percentage share.

Third, is the issue of when one defendant is not present, the same options as above are present. However, there is the initial question of whether to allow the fault of an absent defendant to be considered. States, again, are split on these issues.

Lastly, there is the issue of negligence and intentional torts in a single lawsuit. Courts, in the majority, do not apply comparative responsibility to intentional torts. However, some courts apply comparative responsibility to intentional torts. The law and academia on this issue is very complex, but typically support holding intentional tortfeasors in a suit subject to joint and several liability. Further, any negligent tortfeasor who negligently failed to protect the plaintiff from the intentional tortfeasor will be jointly and severally liable for the portion of the intentional tortfeasor's fault. This view is supported by the Restatement (Third) of Torts: Apportionment of Liability Section 1.

Even more complicated is the issue of whether comparative fault should be allowed in strict liability actions. Most jurisdictions, starting with California (which also pioneered strict liability for defective products), have held that the jury should be allowed to apportion fault between plaintiffs and defendants even in strict products liability actions. The Restatement (Third) of Torts (section 25) reflects the current majority view that comparative negligence applies to the strict liability of defendant.

== See also ==
- In pari delicto
