= Bad law =

Judicial decisions which are not to be relied on

Bad law may be considered to include unsound interpretation of legal principles, or a proposition of law that is erroneous, or an attempted statement of the law that is inaccurate, or non-law.

== Case law ==
The following may be considered bad law:

- A precedent that has been overruled
- A judicial decision that is no law at all
- A judicial decision that was "wrongly decided"
- A judicial decision that was made per incuriam

A case may be reckoned bad law for some years but never actually overruled. Fitzroy v Gwillim and Corbett v Poelnitz are examples of such cases.

The Roberts' Doctrine implied that the Supreme Court of the United States could follow a decision that was bad law in certain circumstances. This doctrine was established by the decision in West Coast Hotel Co. v. Parrish (1937), and abolished by the decision in Erie Railroad Co. v. Tompkins (1938).

=== Wrongly decided ===
Edwin Bell said: An advocate may have to argue that a decision which is a direct authority against him, although it has been accepted as law and followed in numerous cases, was wrongly decided and is what lawyers call "bad law", and should be overruled.

The case of Mills v Armstrong is an instance in which a previous decision in Thorogood v Bryan was overruled on the ground that the decision was opposed to principles of justice. In Thorogood v Bryan the personal representatives of a deceased person brought an action against the owner of an omnibus by which the deceased was run over and killed. The omnibus in which the deceased had been carried had set him down in the middle of the road, instead of drawing up to the curb; and before he could get out of the way he was run over by the defendant's omnibus, which was coming along at too rapid a pace to be able to pull up. Both drivers were found guilty of negligence, but it was held that the plaintiff was not entitled to recover, on the principle that a passenger identifies himself with the conveyance in which he is travelling, and if the driver is guilty of negligence, his fault is imputed to the passenger.

In Mills v Armstrong, a collision occurred between the steamship Bernina and the Steamship Bushire, the result of which was that Armstrong, the first engineer of the Bushire was drowned. The collision was caused by the negligence of those in charge of both ships, and the action was brought by the personal representatives of Armstrong against the owner of The Bernina to recover damages for his death. It was argued that the plaintiff could not recover on the principle laid down in Thorogood v Bryan. But it was held by the House of Lords that the case of Thorogood v Bryan was wrongly decided, and the principle of it was overruled.

=== Erroneous ===
In Butler v Van Wyck (1841), Bronson J, dissenting, said:

It is an elementary principle, that an erroneous decision is not bad law; it is no law at all. It may be final upon the parties then before the court, but it does not conclude other parties having rights depending upon the same question.

In Bradshaw v Duluth Imperial Mill Co (1892), Mitchell J said:

But aside from this, it is an elementary principle that an erroneous decision is not bad law; it is no law at all, and never was the law. It is the law of the particular case, and is binding on the parties before the court, but does not conclude other parties having right depending on the same question.

In 1860, Walker Marshall said:

Erroneous decisions on points of law may be conveniently classed under three heads . . . secondly, the propounding of a proposition to be law which is not so, embracing all that wide field of misdecision commonly called bad law, and comprehending the numerous class of cases where the question turns upon the rules of construction to be applied to charters, grants, and contracts, &c. . . . (2.) The second kind of misdecision is that which is called bad law—that is, a misapprehension of the rule of the common law; for our present purpose including in the term "Common Law" that comprehensive branch technically called "Equity." But the common law can be no more affected by a misconception of what it inculcates than the written letter of a statute can be. In other words, an induction from false premises, or upon fallacious reasoning, can never be sound sense, and therefore it can never be sound law. After the Court of Queen's Bench had laid it down, in a case to which I shall refer presently, that a man on horseback might be impounded with his beast if taken damage feasant; the owner of a field, who seized a trespasser under these circumstances after this decision, offended as much against the law, and was equally responsible for the assault as if his right so to do had never been erroneously affirmed. After the decision of Godsall v. Boldero, 9 East 72, policies of life assurance were not contracts of indemnity, notwithstanding it had been erroneously decided in that case that they were. So, if a tribunal were to give judgment upon an erroneous opinion that a particular custom was unreasonable, the contracts of parties having reference to the custom would be as much controlled by it after as before this decision. And so of all judgments not in rem.

=== "Bad Ellenborough law" ===
As to the suppression of the publication of bad law by law reporters: Lord Campbell said:

Lord Ellenborough ought to have been particularly grateful to me for suppressing his bad decisions. Sir James Mansfield, Chief Justice of the Common Pleas, according to Taunton, observed: 'Whoever reads Campbell's Reports and considers the many new and difficult questions which came before Lord Ellenborough, must be surprised to find how uniformly right he is in his decisions.' The wonder may a little abate when I state my 'garbling process'. Before each number was sent to the press I carefully revised all the cases I had collected for it, and rejected such as were inconsistent with former decisions or recognised principles. When I arrived at the end of my fourth and last volume, I had a whole drawer full of 'bad Ellenborough law'. The threat to publish this I might have used as a weapon of offence when he was rude to me; but his reputation is now secure, for the whole collection was reduced to ashes in the great fire in the Temple.

Lord Campbell's reference to bad law was a reference to wrongly decided cases. Robert Deal said that because the "bad Ellenborough law" is no longer extant, it is not possible to be certain that it actually was bad. The Law Journal said that Campbell's drawer for Lord Ellenborough's bad law was probably opened rather too arrogantly.

The Law Quarterly Review said of the Year Book report at 30 & 31 Edw 1 Br Chr 30, i 506: "Brave reporter! This is better than surreptitiously keeping a drawer like Campbell for Ellenborough's bad law."

== Error of law ==
In Edwards v Bairstowe (1956), Lord Radcliffe said "If the case contains anything ex facie which is bad law and which bears upon the determination, it is obviously erroneous in point of law."

== Bad logic ==
Walker Marshall said that bad law is in many instances nothing else than bad logic.

== See also ==
- Good law
- Hard cases make bad law, a maxim
- Strange laws, those laws which are particularly bizarre
- Oppression
- Injustice
