= Nemo auditur propriam turpitudinem allegans =

Maxim in civil law systems

Nemo auditur propriam turpitudinem allegans is a civil law maxim which may be translated into English as "no one can be heard to invoke his own turpitude" or "no one shall be heard, who invokes his own guilt". The maxim operated with another, in pari causa turpitudinis cessat repetitio (where both parties are guilty, no one may recover), to preclude a court from intervening in a dispute involving an unlawful transaction.

On 30 June 1950, during the 475th meeting of the United Nations Security Council when discussing the validity of resolutions made in the absence of one of the permanent members (during the Soviet boycott), the French delegate invoked the maxim.

== See also ==
- Estoppel
- Ex turpi causa non oritur actio
- In pari delicto
