= Defense (legal) =

Legal procedure

In a civil proceeding or criminal prosecution under the common law or under statute, a defendant may raise a defense (or defence) (Note: The traditional spelling "defence" was used in both American English and British English as late as the 1930s. Since then, Americans have come to regard "defence" as a British affectation and "defense" is the American norm today.) in an effort to avert civil liability or criminal conviction. A defense is put forward by a party to defeat a suit or action brought against the party, and may be based on legal grounds or on factual claims.

Besides contesting the accuracy of an allegation made against the defendant in the proceeding, the defendant may also make allegations against the prosecutor or plaintiff or raise a defense, arguing that, even if the allegations against the defendant are true, the defendant is nevertheless not liable. Acceptance of a defense by the court completely exonerates the defendant and not merely mitigates the liability.

The defense phase of a trial occurs after the prosecution phase, that is, after the prosecution "rests". Other parts of the defense include the opening and closing arguments and the cross-examination during the prosecution phase.

Since a defense is raised by the defendant in a direct attempt to avoid what would otherwise result in liability, the defendant typically holds the burden of proof. For example, a defendant who is charged with assault may claim provocation, but they would need to prove that the plaintiff had provoked the defendant.

== Common law defenses ==
In common law, a defendant may raise any of the numerous defenses to limit or avoid liability. These include:

- Lack of personal or subject matter jurisdiction of the court, such as diplomatic immunity. (In law, this is not a defense as such but an argument that the case should not be heard at all.)
- Failure to state a cause of action or other insufficiencies of pleading.
- Any of the affirmative defenses.
- Defenses conferred by statute – such as a statute of limitations or the statute of frauds.
- Ex turpi causa non oritur actio – the action against the defendant arises from an illegality.
- Volenti non fit injuria – consent by the victim or plaintiff.
- In pari delicto – both sides equally at fault.
- Act of God is an unforeseeable natural phenomenon which involves no human agency due directly to natural causes which cannot be foreseen.
- Necessity harm done to prevent a greater evil is not actionable even though the harm was caused intentionally.
- Mistake whether of fact or of law is no defence to action.
- The law permits use of reasonable force to protect one's person or property. If force is used for self-defence they will not be liable for harm.
- Unclean hands.

In addition to defenses against prosecution and liability, a defendant may also raise a defense of justification – such as self-defense and defense of others or defense of property.

In English law, one could raise the argument of a contramandatum, which was an argument that the plaintiff had no cause for complaint.

== Strategies ==
The defense in a homicide case may attempt to present evidence of the victim's character, to try to prove that the victim had a history of violence or of making threats of violence that suggest a violent character. The goal of presenting character evidence about the victim may be to make more plausible a claim of self-defense, or in the hope of accomplishing jury nullification in which a jury acquits a guilty defendant despite its belief that the defendant committed a criminal act.

== Costs ==
Litigation is expensive and often may last for months or years. Parties can finance their litigation and pay for their attorneys' fees or other legal costs in a number of ways. A defendant can pay with their own money, through legal defense funds, or legal financing companies. For example, in the United Kingdom, a defendant's legal fees may be covered by legal aid.

== See also ==
- Absolute defense
- Lawsuit
- Legal defense fund
- Legal financing
- Public interest defence
