= Uniform Comparative Fault Act =

The Uniform Comparative Fault Act (UCFA), and its periodic revisions, is one of the Uniform Acts drafted by the National Conference of Commissioners on Uniform State Laws (NCCUSL) with the intention of harmonizing state laws in force in the states.

The UCFA seeks to establish an apportionment of liability that is more flexible than the all-or-nothing approaches of the contributory negligence and last clear chance doctrines. Under the UCFA, the judgment against tortfeasors can be reduced according to any negligence on behalf of the plaintiff, and multiple tortfeasors held joint and several liability can seek contributions from their codefendants.

The UCFA has not been adopted by a large number of states, because many states prefer to modify joint and several liability among multiple tortfeasors. An attempt to address these shortcomings of the UCFA has been made with the Uniform Apportionment of Tort Responsibility Act, promulgated in 2002.
