= Ex turpi causa non oritur actio =

Common law doctrine

Ex turpi causa non oritur actio (Latin "action does not arise from a dishonourable cause") is a legal doctrine which states that a plaintiff will be unable to pursue legal relief and damages if it arises in connection with their own tortious act. The corresponding Ex turpe causa non oritur damnum, "From a dishonourable cause, no damage arises" is a similar construction. Particularly relevant in the law of contract, tort and trusts, ex turpi causa is also known as the illegality defence, since a defendant may plead that even though, for instance, he broke a contract, conducted himself negligently or broke an equitable duty, nevertheless a claimant by reason of his own illegality cannot sue. The UK Supreme Court provided a thorough reconsideration of the doctrine in 2016 in Patel v Mirza.

== Illegality in English law ==
=== Development ===
In the early case of Holman v Johnson, Lord Mansfield CJ set out the rationale for the illegality doctrine.

The objection, that a contract is immoral or illegal as between plaintiff and defendant, sounds at all times very ill in the mouth of the defendant. It is not for his sake, however, that the objection is ever allowed; but it is founded in general principles of policy, which the defendant has the advantage of, contrary to the real justice, as between him and the plaintiff, by accident, if I may say so. The principle of public policy is this; ex dolo malo non oritur actio ["no action arises from deceit"]. No court will lend its aid to a man who founds his cause of action upon an immoral or an illegal act. If, from the plaintiff's own standing or otherwise, the cause of action appears to arise ex turpi causa ["from an immoral cause"], or the transgression of a positive law of this country, there the court says he has no right to be assisted. It is upon that ground the court goes; not for the sake of the defendant, but because they will not lend their aid to such a plaintiff. So if the plaintiff and defendant were to change sides, and the defendant was to bring his action against the plaintiff, the latter would then have the advantage of it; for where both were equally in fault, potior est conditio defendentis ["stronger is the position of the defendant"].

=== Tort ===
In the law of tort, the principle would prevent a criminal from bringing a claim against (for example) a fellow criminal. In National Coal Board v England, Lord Asquith said,

If two burglars, A and B, agree to open a safe by means of explosives, and A so negligently handles the explosive charge as to injure B, B might find some difficulty in maintaining an action for negligence against A.

In Hewison v Meridian Shipping Services Pte Ltd, an employee who had obtained his position by concealing his epilepsy was held not to be entitled to claim compensation for future loss of earnings as a result of his employer's negligence, since his deception (resulting in a pecuniary advantage contrary to the Theft Act 1968) would prevent him from obtaining similar employment in future.

It is not absolute in effect. For example, in Revill v Newbery an elderly allotment holder was sleeping in his shed with a shotgun, to deter burglars. On hearing the plaintiff trying to break in, he shot his gun through a hole in the shed, injuring the plaintiff. At first instance, the judge awarded damages on the basis that the defendant had used violence in excess of the reasonable limits allowed by lawful self-defence and was negligent to the standard of care expected of a reasonable man who found himself in such a situation. On appeal the defendant raised the defence of ex turpi causa, but the Court of Appeal held that while public interest required that someone should not benefit from his illegal conduct, different considerations applied in cases arising in tort as opposed to those in a property or contract context. Old common law authorities and the Law Commission report (Liability for Damage or Injury to Trespassers) acknowledged the existence of some duty towards trespassers and the defendant could not rely on the doctrine to relieve himself of liability.

The precise scope of the doctrine is not certain. In some cases, it seems that the illegality prevents a duty of care arising in the first place. For example, in Ashton v Turner the defendant injured the plaintiff by crashing the car they sat in together in the course of fleeing the scene of a burglary they had committed together. Ewbank J held that the court may not recognise a duty of care in such cases as a matter of public policy. Further, in Pitts v Hunt the Court of Appeal rationalised this approach, saying that it was impossible to decide the appropriate standard of care in cases where the parties were involved in illegality.

If the illegality vanishes as a result of legislative action (for example a law making a tortious act not tortious) or some subsequent court case where the law is declared invalid, the tort action will stand. In the case of Martin v. Ziherl, the two parties were girlfriend and boyfriend until Martin discovered Ziherl had given her herpes. Martin sued Ziherl for damages in Virginia Circuit Court, and Ziherl argued that because of the case of Zysk v. Zysk since having sex with someone they were not married to was technically the crime of fornication, Martin could not sue Ziherl because she got herpes as a result of the illegal act. Martin argued the act was unconstitutional. The court agreed with Ziherl and against Martin. Martin appealed, and the Supreme Court of Virginia reversed, agreeing with Martin's argument that because the United States Supreme Court had decided in Lawrence v. Texas that noncommercial, private intimacy was a protected right, the law making fornication a crime was unconstitutional, thus Martin could now sue.

=== Trusts ===
In other cases, the courts view ex turpi as a defence where otherwise a claim would lie, again on grounds of public policy. In Tinsley v Milligan (overruled by Patel v Mirza) Lord Justice Nicholls in the Court of Appeal spoke of the court having to "weigh or balance the adverse consequences of granting relief against the adverse consequences of refusing relief". The plaintiff was ultimately successful in Tinsley v Milligan in the House of Lords, which allowed the claim on the grounds that the plaintiff did not need to rely on the illegality.

=== Contract ===
The doctrine in the aspect of contract essentially does the same thing as one of the vitiating contractual elements known as 'illegality'. Here contractual remedies cannot be enforced by a court on a defendant if it is manifest that the subject matter of the contract is either directly or by implication, contrary to public policy or in contradiction with any existing law or custom. A somewhat related concept in the law of contracts is the equitable defense of unclean hands.

- Everet v Williams [1725] 9 LQR 197

=== Major reconsideration of the doctrine by the UK Supreme Court ===
In 2016 the UK Supreme Court provided a major reconsideration of this doctrine, in Patel v Mirza, overruling the test in Tinsley v Milligan and replacing it with a new set of principles. The changes were described as 'revolutionary' by a judge on the case, Lord Sumption (at [261] in the judgment).

== See also ==
- Acts of the claimant
- Contributory negligence
- Nemo auditur propriam turpitudinem allegans
- Volenti non fit injuria
