= Patel v Mirza =

2016 English contract law case concerning illegality

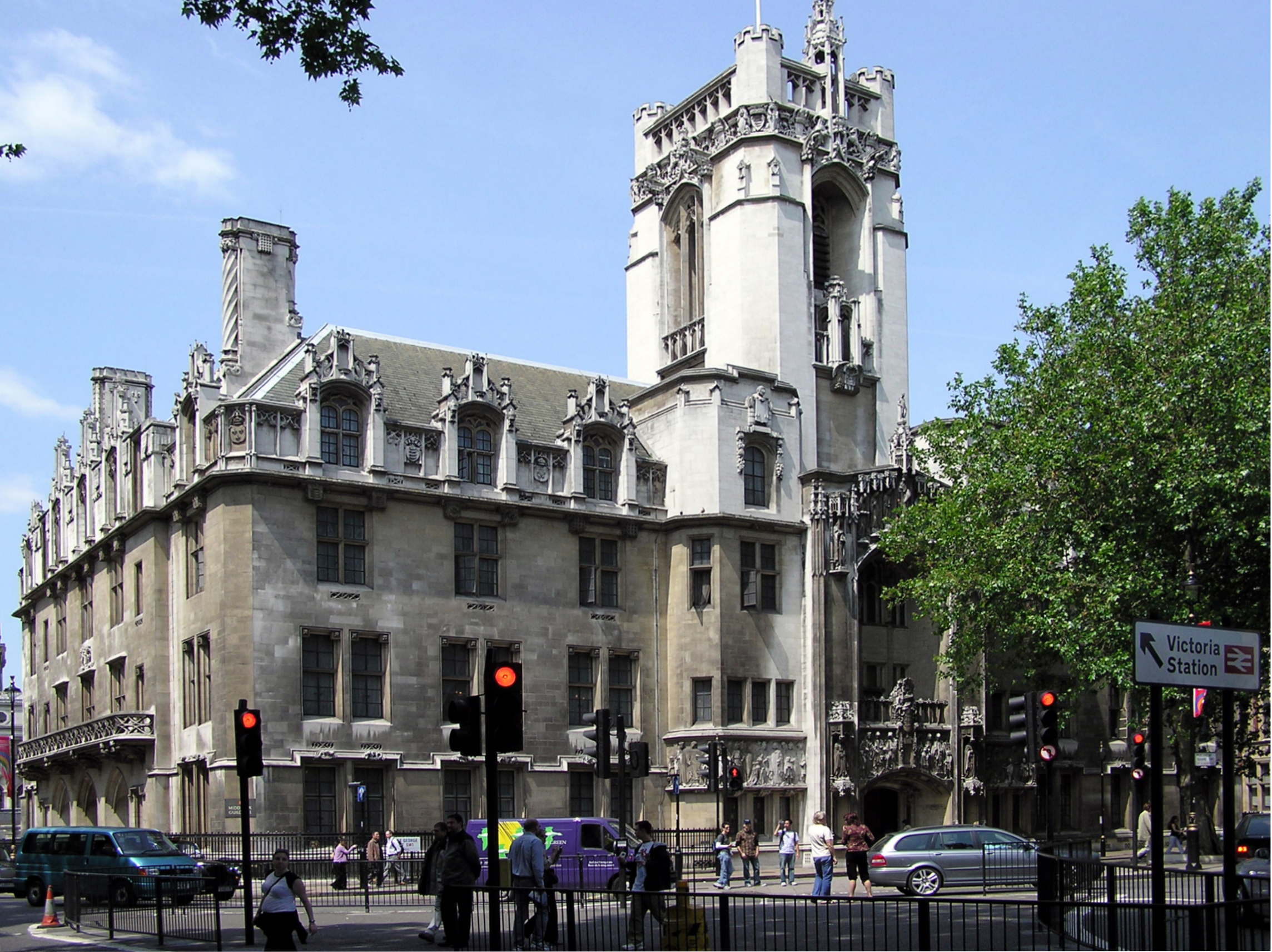
- Court: Supreme Court
- Citation: [2016] UKSC 42

Case history
- Prior action: [2014] EWCA Civ 1047

Keywords
- Illegality, insider trading

Patel v Mirza [2016] UKSC 42 is an English contract law case concerning the scope of the illegality principle relating to insider trading under section 52 of the Criminal Justice Act 1993. In 2020, the Supreme Court described this case as having set out a "a significant development in the law relating to illegality at common law".

== Facts ==
Mr. Patel paid £620,000 to Mr. Mirza pursuant to an agreement under which Mr. Mirza would bet on the price of some shares in Royal Bank of Scotland, on the basis of insider information Mr. Mirza had from his contacts at the bank about a pending government announcement that would affect it. Using advance insider information to profit from trading in securities is an offence under section 52 of the Criminal Justice Act 1993. The scheme did not come to fruition as the expected insider information was mistaken, and Mr. Mirza did not return the funds to Mr. Patel as promised. Thereafter, Mr. Patel brought a claim based on contract and unjust enrichment for the return of £620,000. Mr. Mirza argued that no such obligation could be enforced because the whole contract was illegal, and any claim would be precluded by the principle of ex turpi causa non oritur actio.

== Judgment ==
The UK Supreme Court unanimously dismissed Mr Mirza's appeal, holding that Mr Patel could recover the money he had paid to Mr Mirza and that the formal test in Tinsley v Milligan was no longer representative of the law.

A person who satisfies the ordinary requirements for a claim in unjust enrichment should be entitled to the return of his property; he should not prima facie be debarred from recovering his property just because the consideration which had failed was an unlawful consideration. Mr Patel's claim should be allowed since it would have the effect of returning the parties to their positions prior to the conclusion of the illegal contract, as well as prevent Mr Mirza from being unjustly enriched.

Lord Toulson considered the state of the law concerning illegality:

Looking behind the maxims, there are two broad discernible policy reasons for the common law doctrine of illegality as a defence to a civil claim. One is that a person should not be allowed to profit from his own wrongdoing. The other, linked, consideration is that the law should be coherent and not self-defeating, condoning illegality by giving with the left-hand what it takes with the right hand.

Thus, the prior test in Tinsley v Milligan is inconsistent with the coherence and integrity of the legal system.

Instead, the court should consider whether the public interest would be harmed by the enforcement of the illegal agreement, taking into account:

1. the purpose of the prohibition which has been transgressed, and whether the purpose would be enhanced by the denial of the claim;
2. any other relevant public policy on which the denial of the claim may have an impact; and
3. whether denial of the claim would be a proportionate response to the illegality, bearing in mind that punishment is a matter for the criminal courts.

== See also ==
- United Kingdom company law
- English contract law
