= Contributory negligence =

Defense that victim contributed to their own fault

In some common law jurisdictions, contributory negligence is a defense to a tort claim based on negligence. If it is available, the defense completely bars plaintiffs from any recovery if they contribute to their own injury through their own negligence.

Because the contributory negligence doctrine can lead to harsh results, many common law jurisdictions have abolished it in favor of a "comparative fault" or "comparative negligence" approach. A comparative negligence approach reduces the plaintiff's damages award by the percentage of fault the fact-finder assigns to the plaintiff for their own injury. For example, if a jury thinks the plaintiff is 30% at fault, the plaintiff's damages award will be reduced by 30%.

== History ==
The doctrine of contributory negligence was dominant in U.S. jurisprudence in the 19th and 20th century. The English case Butterfield v. Forrester is generally recognized as the first appearance, although in this case, the judge held the plaintiff's own negligence undermined their argument that the defendant was the proximate cause of the injury. Whether contributory negligence is construed as negating proximate causation or as an affirmative defense, the effect is the same either way: the plaintiff's contributory negligence bars recovery.

== Burden of proof ==
In some jurisdictions, in order to successfully raise a contributory negligence defense, the defendant must prove the negligence of a plaintiff or claimant. In others, the burden of proof is on a plaintiff to disprove their own negligence.

Even if the plaintiff was negligent, the tortfeasor may still be held liable if they had the last clear chance to prevent the injury, meaning even though the plaintiff was negligent the defendant was the last person with a clear opportunity to take action that would have prevented the plaintiff's injury from occurring.

== Examples of contributory negligence ==
Example 1: A pedestrian crosses a road negligently and is hit by a driver who was driving negligently. Since the pedestrian has also contributed to the accident, they may be barred from complete and full recovery of damages from the driver (or their insurer) because the accident was less likely to occur if it hadn't been for their failure to keep a proper lookout.

Example 2: A plaintiff actively disregards warnings or fails to take reasonable steps for his or her safety, such as diving in shallow water without checking the depth first.

== Pleading requirements ==
In some jurisdictions, such as United States federal courts, contributory negligence must be pleaded in the defendant's answer to the complaint as an affirmative defense. But in some jurisdictions it may be applied by the court in a tort matter irrespective of whether it was pleaded as a defense.

== Availability ==
The contributory negligence defense is not available to a tortfeasor whose conduct rises above the level of ordinary negligence to intentional or malicious wrongdoing.

The classic version of contributory negligence, where a plaintiff who is even 0.01% negligent is barred from recovery, nowadays is referred to as "pure contributory negligence." Some states have adopted a "modified" or "mixed" version of contributory negligence where the plaintiff is only barred from recovery if he or she was more than a certain percentage at fault (typically, more than 50% at fault for their own injury).

=== Australia ===
In Australia, civil liability is governed by the Australian common law and the relevant statutes of the States and Territories. Most jurisdictions have enacted legislation that covers findings of non-absolute contributory negligence otherwise known as comparative negligence. In New South Wales, upon a finding by the court of contributory negligence, the award of damages is reduced by the same percentage as the plaintiff's own negligence. For example, if the plaintiff was 50% negligent in causing the accident, but would otherwise be entitled to $100,000 in damages, a court will award only $50,000. A court is also permitted to find 100% contributory negligence is applicable in which case the plaintiff is not entitled to any damages. However, a finding of 100% contributory negligence has never been upheld by an appeal court in Australia and the provision of the Civil Liability Act has received been identified by some judges and academics as a strange provision. Determining the extent of the contributory negligence is subjective and heavily dependent on the evidence available. Parties will often work to negotiate a mutually satisfactory percentage figure when engaging in alternative dispute resolution (such as mediation). If the matter does not settle, a percentage figure is ultimately assigned by the court at the hearing.

In Australia, contributory negligence is available when the plaintiff's own negligence contributed to its own injuries. Also refer to Pennington v Norris for second test.

=== United States ===
In the United States, the pure contributory negligence only applies in Alabama, Maryland, North Carolina and Virginia. The District of Columbia largely follows the contributory negligence model, but with exceptions for motor vehicle accidents involving pedestrians and bicycles. Indiana applies pure contributory negligence to medical malpractice cases and tort claims against governmental entities. In the other 45 states in the U.S., plaintiff's recovery is simply diminished by the extent to which they contributed to the harm under principles of comparative negligence, with some states using a mixed model of comparative and contributory negligence. A state with a mixed model may, for example, prevent a plaintiff from recovering damages if the plaintiff is determined to bear more than 50% of the responsibility for the injury.

It is not a defense to any intentional tort.

=== United Kingdom ===
In England and Wales, it is not possible to defeat a claim under contributory negligence and therefore completely deny the victim compensation. It does however allow for a reduction in damages recoverable to the extent the court sees fit.

In England and Wales, it is not a defense to the tort of conversion or trespass to chattels.

== See also ==
- Comparative negligence
- Comparative responsibility
- Damages
- Last clear chance
- In pari delicto
