= In pari delicto =

Latin for "in equal fault"

In pari delicto (potior/melior est conditio possidentis), Latin for "in equal fault (better is the condition of the possessor)", is a legal term used to refer to two persons or entities who are equally at fault, whether the malfeasance in question is a crime or tort. The doctrine is subject to a number of exceptions, including that the plaintiff must be an active, voluntary participant in the wrongful conduct, the plaintiff's wrongdoing must be at least substantially equal to or greater than that of the defendant, the "adverse interest" exception, and the "innocent insider" exception.

== The doctrine ==
The phrase is most commonly used by courts when relief is being denied to both parties in a civil action because of equal wrongdoing by both parties, or greater culpability on the part of the plaintiff. The phrase means, in essence, that if both parties are equally at fault or the plaintiff is at greater fault, the court will not involve itself in resolving one side's claim over the other, and whoever possesses whatever is in dispute may continue to do so in the absence of a superior claim. It is an equitable defense.

The doctrines of comparative fault (a doctrine of tort law that compares the fault of each party in a lawsuit for a single injury) and contributory negligence (applicable when plaintiffs/claimants have, through their own negligence, contributed to the harm they suffered) are not the same as in pari delicto, though all of these doctrines have related policy rationale underpinnings.

== Exceptions to the doctrine ==
Judge George B. Daniels of the Southern District of New York held in 2010 in SEC v. Lee, 720 F. Supp. 2d 305, that:

To successfully apply the doctrine, the plaintiff must be an active, voluntary participant in the wrongful conduct, and the plaintiff's wrongdoing must be at least substantially equal to that of the defendant. ... Furthermore, under New York law, the doctrine of in pari delicto may be subject to the "adverse interest" exception, which applies when an agent is defrauding the principal exclusively for the agent's own benefit and to the detriment of the corporation. ... Another exception to the in pari delicto defense is the "innocent insider" exception, which provides that if there is another agent within the corporation who had no knowledge of the fraud, and who had the will and the ability to stop the fraud had it come to his or her attention, the in pari delicto defense will fail ...

== See also ==
- Equitable remedy
- Equity (law)
- Nemo auditur propriam turpitudinem allegans
- Pot calling the kettle black
- Tu quoque
