= Tinsley v Milligan =

1993 English trusts law case

- Court: House of Lords
- Citation: [1993] UKHL 3 [1994] 1 AC 340
- Transcript: BAILII

Court membership
- Judges sitting: Lord Keith of Kinkel; Lord Goff of Chieveley; Lord Jauncey of Tullichettle; Lord Lowry; Lord Browne-Wilkinson

Keywords
- Illegality, resulting trust, presumption

Tinsley v Milligan [1993] UKHL 3 is an English trusts law case, concerning resulting trusts, the presumption of advancement and illegality.

The decision was criticised as "creating capricious results". It has now been overruled by Patel v Mirza [2016] UKSC 42.

== Facts ==
Miss Tinsley sought possession of a house that was solely in her name. Her relationship with her partner, Miss Milligan, had come to an end. Miss Milligan had been living there and had contributed to the purchase price. It had been in Tinsley’s name alone when they bought it, as a way of claiming more in social security. Milligan later repented and confessed to the benefit fraud. Then Tinsley moved out and sought possession of the house, arguing she was solely entitled. Miss Milligan pleaded that it was the common intention that the property should belong to both of them (and so did not need to rely on the illegality).

== Judgment ==
The House of Lords held that because Miss Milligan could invoke the presumption of a resulting trust without relying on the illegal purpose, she did have a share in the house. Miss Tinsley would have to rely on her intention to defraud the social security system to rebut the presumption of a resulting trust and get the property in her own name. Lord Browne-Wilkinson said the following.

Therefore, in cases where the presumption of advancement does not apply, a plaintiff can establish his equitable interest in the property without relying in any way on the underlying illegal transaction. In this case Miss Milligan as defendant simply pleaded the common intention that the property should belong to both of them and that she contributed to the purchase price: she claimed that in consequence the property belonged to them equally. To the same effect was her evidence in chief. Therefore Miss Milligan was not forced to rely on the illegality to prove her equitable interest. Only in the reply and the course of Miss Milligan's cross-examination did such illegality emerge: it was Miss Tinsley who had to rely on that illegality. Although the presumption of advancement does not directly arise for consideration in this case, it is important when considering the decided cases to understand its operation. On a transfer from a man to his wife, children or others to whom he stands in loco parentis, equity presumes an intention to make a gift. Therefore in such a case, unlike the case where the presumption of resulting trust applies, in order to establish any claim the plaintiff has himself to lead evidence sufficient to rebut the presumption of gift and in so doing will normally have to plead, and give evidence of, the underlying illegal purpose.

== Clean hands doctrine ==
Curiously the House of Lords treated the sole question to be answered as one of illegality in relation to contract. Despite the central plan being to make fraudulent claims for social security payment, none of the judgments considered withholding the equitable remedy on the basis of the clean hands doctrine ("those seeking equity must come with clean hands").

== See also ==
- English trusts law
