= List of judgments of the Supreme Court of the United Kingdom delivered in 2014 =

This is a list of the judgments given by the Supreme Court of the United Kingdom in the year 2014. They are ordered by neutral citation.

In 2014 Lord Neuberger of Abbotsbury was the President of the Supreme Court; Lady Hale of Richmond was the Deputy President.

The table lists judgments made by the court and the opinions of the judges in each case. Judges are treated as having concurred in another's judgment when they either formally attach themselves to the judgment of another or speak only to acknowledge their concurrence with one or more judges. Any judgment which reaches a conclusion that differs from the majority on one or more major points of the appeal has been treated as dissent.

All dates are for 2014 unless expressly stated otherwise.

== 2014 case summaries ==
Unless otherwise noted, cases were heard by a panel of 5 judges.

Cases involving Scots law are highlighted in orange. Cases involving Northern Irish law are highlighted in green.

Case name	Citation	Date	Legal subject	Summary of decision
Re LC (Children)	[2014] UKSC 1	15 January 2014	Hague Convention on the Civil Aspects of International Child Abduction	
Marley v Rawlings	[2014] UKSC 2	22 January 2014	Wills	
R (HS2 Action Alliance Ltd) v Secretary of State for Transport	[2014] UKSC 3	22 January 2014	Judicial review	
Re an application of Raymond Brownlee for Judicial Review	[2014] UKSC 4	5 February 2014	Legal aid	
R v Mackle (Nos. 1, 2 and 3), and R v McLaughlin	[2014] UKSC 5	29 January 2014	Evasion of customs duty	
I.A. v The Secretary of State for the Home Department	[2014] UKSC 6	29 January 2014	Immigration law	
Adamson v Paddico (267) Ltd	[2014] UKSC 7	5 February 2014	Village greens	
Richardson v DPP	[2014] UKSC 8	5 February 2014	Criminal law	
Cramaso LLP v Ogilvie-Grant, Earl of Seafield	[2014] UKSC 9	12 February 2014	Delict	
Williams v Central Bank of Nigeria	[2014] UKSC 10	19 February 2014	Trusts; Fraud; Jurisdiction	
Commissioners for Her Majesty's Revenue and Customs v Marks and Spencer plc	[2014] UKSC 11	19 February 2014	Corporate tax	
R (EM (Eritrea)) v Secretary of State for the Home Department	[2014] UKSC 12	19 February 2014	Immigration law; Article 3, ECHR	
Coventry v Lawrence	[2014] UKSC 13	26 February 2014	Legal Expenses Insurance; Article 6, ECHR	
Commissioners for Her Majesty's Revenue and Customs v Forde and McHugh Ltd	[2014] UKSC 14	26 February 2014	National Insurance	
Stott v Thomas Cook Tour Operators Ltd	[2014] UKSC 15	5 March 2014	Montreal Convention	
Commissioners for Her Majesty's Revenue and Customs v Secret Hotels2 Ltd (formerly Med Hotels Ltd)	[2014] UKSC 16	5 March 2014	Value Added Tax	
R (British Sky Broadcasting Ltd) v The Commissioner of Police of the Metropolis	[2014] UKSC 17	12 March 2014	Secret trial	
Dunhill v Burgin	[2014] UKSC 18	12 March 2014	Negligence	
P v Cheshire West and Chester Council (Note: An augmented panel of 7 judges sat in this case.)	[2014] UKSC 19	19 March 2014	Mental Capacity Act 2005	
Kennedy v The Charity Commission	[2014] UKSC 20	26 March 2014	Freedom of information	
Durkin v DSG Retail Ltd	[2014] UKSC 21	26 March 2014	Consumer protection law	
Cox v Ergo Versicherung AG (formerly known as Victoria)	[2014] UKSC 22	2 April 2014	Jurisdiction	
R v O'Brien	[2014] UKSC 23	2 April 2014	Extradition Act 2003	
British Telecommunications plc v Telefónica O2 Ltd	[2014] UKSC 24	9 April 2014	Competition law	
A v British Broadcasting Corporation	[2014] UKSC 25	8 May 2014	Article 10, ECHR	
Barnes v The Eastenders Group	[2014] UKSC 26	8 May 2014	Receivership	
L Batley Pet Products Ltd v North Lanarkshire Councilt	[2014] UKSC 27	8 May 2014	Contract law	
R (Fitzroy George) v The Secretary of State for the Home Department	[2014] UKSC 28	14 May 2014	Immigration law	
Re K (A Child)	[2014] UKSC 29	15 May 2014	Hague Convention on the Civil Aspects of International Child Abduction	
Secretary of State for Home Department v MN and KY	[2014] UKSC 30	21 May 2014	Immigration law	
R (Barkas) v North Yorkshire County Council	[2014] UKSC 31	21 May 2014	Village green	
Clyde & Co LLP v Winkelhof	[2014] UKSC 32	21 May 2014	Labour law	
Khaira v Shergill	[2014] UKSC 33	11 June 2014	Trust law	
R (Eastenders Cash and Carry plc) v The Commissioners for Her Majesty's Revenue and Customs	[2014] UKSC 34	11 June 2014	HM Customs and Excise	
R (T) v Secretary of State for the Home Department	[2014] UKSC 35	18 June 2014	Rehabilitation of Offenders Act 1974	
R v Ahmad	[2014] UKSC 36	18 June 2014	Proceeds of Crime Act 2002	
R (Nunn) v Chief Constable of Suffolk Constabulary	[2014] UKSC 37	18 June 2014	Evidence	
R (Nicklinson) v Ministry of Justice (Note: An augmented panel of 9 judges sat in this case)	[2014] UKSC 38	25 June 2014	Assisted suicide	
R (Whiston) v Secretary of State for Justice	[2014] UKSC 39	2 July 2014	Article 5, ECHR	
The Manchester Ship Canal Company Ltd v United Utilities Water plc	[2014] UKSC 40	2 July 2014	Water Industry Act 1991	
Henderson v Foxworth Investments Ltd	[2014] UKSC 41	2 July 2014	Insolvency law	
British Telecommunications plc v Telefónica O2 Ltd	[2014] UKSC 42	9 July 2014	Competition law	
Agricultural Sector (Wales) Bill – Reference by the Attorney General for England and Wales	[2014] UKSC 43	9 July 2014	Devolution in Wales	
R (Sandiford) v The Secretary of State for Foreign and Commonwealth Affairs	[2014] UKSC 44	16 July 2014	Lindsay Sandiford case; Consular assistance	
FHR European Ventures LLP v Cedar Capital Partners LLC	[2014] UKSC 45	16 July 2014	Duties of a fiduciary	
Coventry v Lawrence (No. 2)	[2014] UKSC 46	23 July 2014	Injunctions; Article 6, ECHR	
Hounga v Allen	[2014] UKSC 47	30 July 2014	Labour law	
David T Morrison & Co Ltd t/a Gael Home Interiors v ICL Plastics Ltd	[2014] UKSC 48	30 July 2014	Delict	
Healthcare at Home Ltd v The Common Services Agency	[2014] UKSC 49	30 July 2014	Procurement	
Robertson v Swift	[2014] UKSC 50	9 September 2014	Consumer protection law	
Marley v Rawlings (Costs)	[2014] UKSC 51	18 September 2014	Costs	
Scott v Southern Pacific Mortgages Ltd	[2014] UKSC 52	22 October 2014	Sale and rent back	
McDonald v National Grid Electricity Transmission Plc	[2014] UKSC 53	22 October 2014	Mesothelioma; Negligence	
R (Barclay) v Secretary of State for Justice and Lord Chancellor	[2014] UKSC 54	22 October 2014	Jurisdiction	
Les Laboratoires Servier v Apotex Inc	[2014] UKSC 55	29 October 2014	Ex turpi causa	
R (Moseley) v London Borough of Haringey	[2014] UKSC 56	29 October 2014	Council tax	
Telchadder v Wickland Holdings Ltd	[2014] UKSC 57	5 November 2014	Occupiers' liability	
AIB Group (UK) v Mark Redler & Co Solicitors	[2014] UKSC 58	5 November 2014	Breach of trust	
VB v Westminster Magistrates' Court	[2014] UKSC 59	5 November 2014	Secret trial; Article 6, ECHR	
R (Lord Carlile of Berriew QC) v Secretary of State for the Home Department	[2014] UKSC 60	12 November 2014	Article 10, ECHR	
Plevin v Paragon Personal Finance Ltd	[2014] UKSC 61	12 November 2014	Payment protection insurance	
R (ZH and CN) v London Borough of Newham and London Borough of Lewisham	[2014] UKSC 62	12 November 2014	Homelessness	
Sims v Dacorum Borough Council	[2014] UKSC 63	12 November 2014	Landlord-tenant law	
HRH Prince Abdulaziz Bin Mishal Bin Abdulaziz v Apex Global Management Ltd	[2014] UKSC 64	26 November 2014	Company law	
Loveridge v Mayor and Burgesses of the London Borough of Lambeth	[2014] UKSC 65	3 December 2014	Eviction	
R (Haney, Kaiyam & Massey) v Secretary of State for Justice	[2014] UKSC 66	10 December 2014	Sentencing; Article 5, ECHR	
Moohan v The Lord Advocate	[2014] UKSC 67	17 December 2014	Prisoners' voting	
Greater Glasgow Health Board v Doogan	[2014] UKSC 68	17 December 2014	Abortion; Conscientious objection	

== 2014 opinions ==
Delivered a judgment (majority)	Concurred in the judgment of another justice (majority)	Delivered a judgment (dissenting)	Concurred in the judgment of another justice (dissent)	Did not participate in the decision

Case name	Citation	Argued	Decided	Neuberger of Abbotsbury	Hale of Richmond	Mance	Kerr of Tonaghmore	Clarke of Stone-cum-Ebony	Wilson of Culworth	Sumption	Reed	Carnwath of Notting Hill	Hughes of Ombersley	Toulson	Hodge
Re LC (Children)	[2014] UKSC 1	11 November 2013	15 January
Marley v Rawlings	[2014] UKSC 2	3 December 2013	22 January
R (HS2 Action Alliance Ltd) v Secretary of State for Transport	[2014] UKSC 3	15–16 October 2013	22 January
Re an application of Raymond Brownlee for Judicial Review	[2014] UKSC 4	5 December 2013	29 January
R v Mackle (Nos. 1, 2 and 3), and R v McLaughlin	[2014] UKSC 5	11 December 2013	29 January
I.A. v The Secretary of State for the Home Department	[2014] UKSC 6	26 November 2013	29 January
Adamson v Paddico (267) Ltd	[2014] UKSC 7	15 January	5 February
Richardson v DPP	[2014] UKSC 8	12 November 2013	5 February
Cramaso LLP v Ogilvie-Grant, Earl of Seafield	[2014] UKSC 9	18–19 November 2013	12 February
Williams v Central Bank of Nigeria	[2014] UKSC 10	4–5 November 2013	19 February
Commissioners for Her Majesty's Revenue and Customs v Marks and Spencer plc	[2014] UKSC 11	25–26 November 2013	19 February
R (EM (Eritrea)) v Secretary of State for the Home Department	[2014] UKSC 12	6–7 November 2013	19 February
Coventry v Lawrence	[2014] UKSC 13	12–14 November 2013	26 February
Commissioners for Her Majesty's Revenue and Customs v Forde and McHugh Ltd	[2014] UKSC 14	16 January	26 February
Stott v Thomas Cook Tour Operators Ltd	[2014] UKSC 15	20 November 2013	5 March
Commissioners for Her Majesty's Revenue and Customs v Secret Hotels2 Ltd (formerly Med Hotels Ltd)	[2014] UKSC 16	29–30 January	5 March
R (British Sky Broadcasting Ltd) v The Commissioner of Police of the Metropolis	[2014] UKSC 17	3 December 2013	12 March
Dunhill v Burgin (Note: The Master of the Rolls, Lord Dyson, also sat on this case. He agreed with the majority.)	[2014] UKSC 18	3–5 February	12 March
P v v Cheshire West and Chester Council (Note: The chart shows the judgment of the court in the case of P. Two other appeals (from MIG and MEG) were held concurrently and allowed by a majority of 4 to 3 (Lords Clarke of Stone-cum-Ebony, Carnwath of Notting Hill and Hodge dissenting).)	[2014] UKSC 19	21–23 October 2013	19 March
Kennedy v The Charity Commission	[2014] UKSC 20	29 & 31 October 2013	26 March
Durkin v DSG Retail Ltd	[2014] UKSC 21	28 January	26 March
Cox v Ergo Versicherung AG (formerly known as Victoria)	[2014] UKSC 22	20–21 January	2 April
R v O'Brien	[2014] UKSC 23	5 December 2013	2 April
British Telecommunications plc v Telefónica O2 Ltd	[2014] UKSC 24	3–4 February	9 April
A v British Broadcasting Corporation	[2014] UKSC 25	22–23 January	8 May
Barnes v The Eastenders Group	[2014] UKSC 26	24–25 February	8 May
L Batley Pet Products Ltd v North Lanarkshire Councilt	[2014] UKSC 27	17 March	8 May
R (Fitzroy George) v The Secretary of State for the Home Department	[2014] UKSC 28	4 March	14 May
Re K (A Child)	[2014] UKSC 29	8 April	15 May
Secretary of State for Home Department v MN and KY	[2014] UKSC 30	5–6 March	21 May
R (Barkas) v North Yorkshire County Council	[2014] UKSC 31	2 April	21 May
Clyde & Co LLP v Winkelhof	[2014] UKSC 32	24–25 March	21 May
Khaira v Shergill	[2014] UKSC 33	19–20 February	11 June
R (Eastenders Cash and Carry plc) v The Commissioners for Her Majesty's Revenue and Customs	[2014] UKSC 34	27–28 November 2013	11 June
R (T) v Secretary of State for the Home Department	[2014] UKSC 35	9–10 December 2013	18 June
R v Ahmad	[2014] UKSC 36	10–11 February	18 June
R (Nunn) v Chief Constable of Suffolk Constabulary	[2014] UKSC 37	13 March	18 June
R (Nicklinson) v Ministry of Justice (Note: The chart shows the judgment by the court in the appeals by Nicklinson and Lamb. It also unanimously allowed an appeal by the DPP and dismissed a cross-appeal by Martin.)	[2014] UKSC 38	16–19 December 2013	25 June
R (Whiston) v Secretary of State for Justice	[2014] UKSC 39	26 March	2 July
The Manchester Ship Canal Company Ltd v United Utilities Water plc	[2014] UKSC 40	6–7 May	2 July
Henderson v Foxworth Investments Ltd	[2014] UKSC 41	14 May	2 July
British Telecommunications plc v Telefónica O2 Ltd	[2014] UKSC 42	3–4 February	9 July
Agricultural Sector (Wales) Bill – Reference by the Attorney General for England and Wales (Note: Lord Thomas of Cwmgiedd also sat on this case. He gave the lead judgment alongside Lord Reed.)	[2014] UKSC 43	17–18 February	9 July
R (Sandiford) v The Secretary of State for Foreign and Commonwealth Affairs	[2014] UKSC 44	4 June	16 July
FHR European Ventures LLP v Cedar Capital Partners LLC (Note: Lord Collins of Mapesbury also sat on this case. He agreed with the majority.)	[2014] UKSC 45	17–19 June	16 July
Coventry v Lawrence (No. 2)	[2014] UKSC 46	12 May	23 July
Hounga v Allen	[2014] UKSC 47	31 March-1 April	30 July
David T Morrison & Co Ltd v ICL Plastics Ltd	[2014] UKSC 48	7 April	30 July
Healthcare at Home Ltd v The Common Services Agency	[2014] UKSC 49	23 June	30 July
Robertson v Swift	[2014] UKSC 50	19 March	9 September
Marley v Rawlings (Costs)	[2014] UKSC 51	3 December 2013	18 September
Scott v Southern Pacific Mortgages Ltd (Note: Lord Collins of Mapesbury also sat on this case. He gave a judgment for the majority that Lord Sumption agreed with.)	[2014] UKSC 52	3–4 March	22 October
McDonald v National Grid Electricity Transmission Plc (Note: The chart shows the decision for the appeal. The decision on the cross-appeal was by a majority of four to one (Lady Hale of Richmond dissenting).)	[2014] UKSC 53	12–13 February	22 October
R (Barclay) v Secretary of State for Justice and Lord Chancellor	[2014] UKSC 54	30 June	22 October
Les Laboratoires Servier v Apotex Inc	[2014] UKSC 55	10 June	29 October
R (Moseley) v London Borough of Haringey	[2014] UKSC 56	19 June	29 October
Telchadder v Wickland Holdings Ltd	[2014] UKSC 57	1 May	5 November
AIB Group (UK) v Mark Redler & Co Solicitors	[2014] UKSC 58	5 June	5 November
VB v Westminster Magistrates' Court	[2014] UKSC 59	11–12 June	5 November
R (Lord Carlile of Berriew QC) v Secretary of State for the Home Department	[2014] UKSC 60	13 May	12 November
Plevin v Paragon Personal Finance Ltd	[2014] UKSC 61	11–12 June	12 November
R (ZH and CN) v London Borough of Newham and London Borough of Lewisham	[2014] UKSC 62	23–24 & 26 June	12 November
Sims v Dacorum Borough Council	[2014] UKSC 63	23–24 & 26 June	12 November
HRH Prince Abdulaziz Bin Mishal Bin Abdulaziz v Apex Global Management Ltd	[2014] UKSC 64	13 October	26 November
Loveridge v Mayor and Burgesses of the London Borough of Lambeth	[2014] UKSC 65	21 October	3 December
R (Haney, Kaiyam & Massey) v Secretary of State for Justice (Note: The chart shows the judgment of the court in the appeal of Haney, Kaiyam and Massey. The article 5 appeal by Robinson was dismissed by a majority of four to one (Lord Mance dissenting).)	[2014] UKSC 66	19–21 May	10 December
Moohan v The Lord Advocate	[2014] UKSC 67	24 July	17 December
Greater Glasgow Health Board v Doogan	[2014] UKSC 68	11 November	17 December
