= Tessaro =

Tessaro is an Italian occupational surname meaning "weaver". Notable people with the surname include:

- Kathleen Tessaro (born 1965), American author
