= Wilkinson v Downton =

English tort law decision

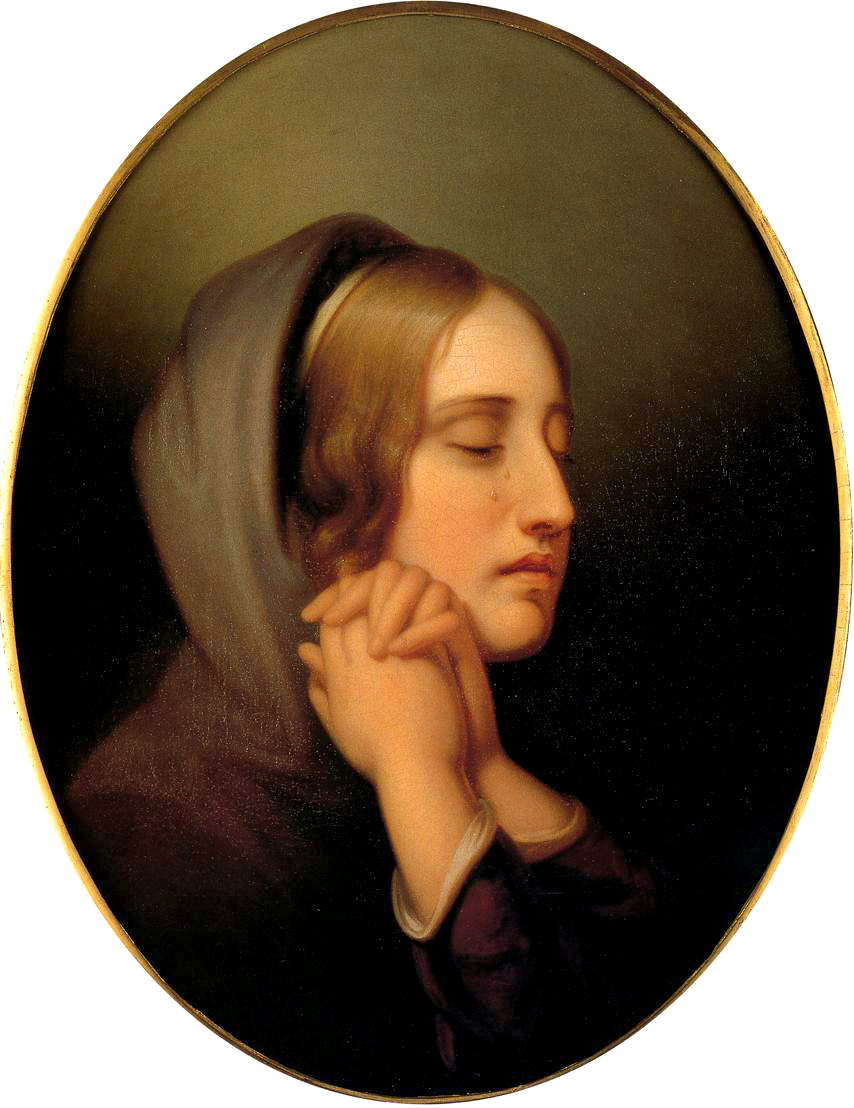
- Court: High Court of Justice
- Decided: 8 May 1897
- Citations: [1897] EWHC 1 (QB); [1897] 2 QB 57
- Cases cited: Lynch v Knight (1861) 9 HLC 577, 11 ER 854 (17 July 1861)

Court membership
- Judge sitting: Wright J

Keywords
- Mental shock

Wilkinson v Downton [1897] EWHC 1 (QB), [1897] 2 QB 57 is an English tort law decision in which the Common Law first recognised the tort of intentional infliction of mental shock.

== Background ==
Thomas Wilkinson was the landlord of the Albion public house in Limehouse, London. A regular customer of the public house, named Mr Downton, decided to play a practical joke on Wilkinson's wife. When Mr Wilkinson went to see the races in Harlow, Essex, he left his wife to manage the house. Downton approached Mrs Wilkinson and told her, falsely, that her husband had been seriously injured in an accident. He said that Mr Wilkinson had suffered two broken legs, and was lying at The Elms in Leytonstone. He told Mrs Wilkinson that she should go to her husband in a cab and bring two pillows to carry him home.

The effect of Downton's false statement to Mrs Wilkinson was a violent shock to her nervous system, causing her to vomit and for her hair to turn white and other more serious and permanent physical consequences which at one point threatened her reason, and entailing weeks of suffering and incapacity to her as well as expense to her husband for medical treatment. These consequences were not in any way the result of a history of bad health or weakness of constitution; nor was there any evidence of predisposition to nervous shock or any other idiosyncrasy.

Mrs Wilkinson sued on an action on the case.

== Opinion of the Court ==
Mr Justice Wright held that Mrs Wilkinson had a valid claim for the intentional infliction of mental shock, and awarded her £100. She was entitled to a small claim for 1s 10½d for the cost of railway fares of persons sent by the plaintiff to Leytonstone in obedience to the false statement. As to this 1s 10½d expended in railway fares on the faith of the defendant's statement, the statement was a misrepresentation intended to be acted on to the damage of the plaintiff.

Furthermore, Wright J observed that since there was no physical touching there could be no grounds for a claim in battery, and as Mrs Wilkinson did not apprehend any immediate physical violence, no claim would lie in common law assault. He gave two requirements for an action in nervous shock, basing it on the physical harm that flowed from the shock. The defendant has to have wilfully done an act "calculated to cause physical harm to the plaintiff". And the defendant has to have in fact caused physical harm to the plaintiff. The degree of intention is not read narrowly. The question is "whether the defendant's act was so plainly calculated to produce some effect of the kind which was produced."

The defendant has, as I assume for the moment, wilfully done an act calculated to cause physical harm to the plaintiff—that is to say, to infringe her legal right to personal safety, and has in fact thereby caused physical harm to her. That proposition without more appears to me to state a good cause of action...

== Subsequent case law ==
The reasoning in Wilkinson was upheld by the Court of Appeal of England and Wales in 1919 in Janvier v Sweeney. During the First World War, Mlle Janvier lived as a paid companion in a house in Mayfair, London, and corresponded with her German lover who was interned as an enemy alien on the Isle of Man. Sweeney was a private detective who wanted secretly to obtain some of her employer's documents and sent his assistant to induce her to co-operate by pretending to be from Scotland Yard and saying that the authorities wanted her because she was corresponding with a German spy. Mlle Janvier suffered severe nervous shock from which she took a long time to recover. The jury awarded her £250.

The House of Lords later summarized the nature of the tort in Wainwright v Home Office, a case concerning a young man with cerebral palsy who had been strip-searched before visiting his brother in prison. Lord Hoffmann, in his speech, declared that "It does not provide a remedy for distress which does not amount to recognized psychiatric injury and so far as there may be a tort of intention under which such damage is recoverable, the necessary intention was not established. I am also in complete agreement ... that Wilkinson v Downton has nothing to do with trespass to the person."

In 2015, the United Kingdom Supreme Court reviewed the jurisprudence surrounding Wilkinson, in the case Rhodes v OPO [2015] UKSC 32 and held that it could not be used to override the freedom to report the truth. In the leading judgment, Lady Hale and Lord Toulson stated that, with respect to the intention to cause harm:

1. The intention need not be actually to cause the psychological illness which resulted (although such an illness is a necessary component of the tort under the consequence element), it was sufficient that the defendant intended to cause severe distress.
2. Recklessness as to causing severe distress would not be sufficient to constitute the tort: an actual intention to cause severe distress was required.

In his concurring judgment, Lord Neuberger gave guidance as to when a statement which causes distress to a claimant would be considered to be actionable:

1. there must be circumstances in which such a tort should exist, it would not be right to abolish the cause of action entirely;
2. the boundaries of the tort must be relatively narrow, given the importance of freedom of expression;
3. the tort should be defined as clearly as possible so there is legal certainty;
4. given "the almost literally infinite permutations of possible human interactions … no set of parameters can be devised which would cater for absolutely every possibility"; and
5. "it would be wrong to express a concluded view, and to let the law develop in a characteristic common law way, namely on a case by case basis."

Lord Neuberger also noted in obiter that:

As I see it, therefore, there is plainly a powerful case for saying that, in relation to the instant tort, liability for distressing statements, where intent to cause distress is an essential ingredient, it should be enough for the claimant to establish that he suffered significant distress as a result of the defendant's statement. It is not entirely easy to see why, if an intention to cause the claimant significant distress is an ingredient of the tort and is enough to establish the tort in principle, the claimant should have to establish that he suffered something more serious than significant distress before he can recover compensation. (at 119)

== See also ==
- Intentional infliction of emotional distress
- Nervous shock (English Law)
