= John Pickle Company =

The John Pickle Company, Inc. (JPC) is a Tulsa, Oklahoma based oil industry parts manufacturer. The Tulsa factory closed in September 2002. The company currently has operations in Kuwait, John Pickle Middle East, the pressure-vessel division of Kuwait Pipe Industries and Oil Services Company (KPS).

The company is notable for having suffered a significant legal loss to the U.S. Equal Employment Opportunity Commission (EEOC), when a federal judge ordered John Pickle Company, Inc. (JPC) and its president, John Pickle, to pay $1.3 million to 52 male victims of national origin discrimination and human trafficking. The workers were recruited from India as skilled laborers in 2001 and then subjected to widespread abuse, intimidation and exploitation. With the help of church workers, they left the plant in early 2002.

== Lawsuit and ruling ==
In its 2003 lawsuit, the EEOC charged the Tulsa, Okla.-based oil industry parts manufacturer with recruiting the class of foreign employees to the United States with assurances they would work under conditions similar to those of Americans. Indian witnesses testified at trial to being deceived by JPC that they were being brought to the U.S. with the promise of lawful wages and appropriate working conditions. However, once they arrived, the workers had their identification and immigration documents confiscated by JPC, were crammed into a warehouse “dormitory,” and only paid between $1.00 and $3.17 per hour (while non-Indian employees of JPC were paid approximately $14.00 per hour for performing the same type of skilled work).

The court relied on findings from testimony that the highly skilled welders and fitters from India were also made to perform janitorial work, replace a septic tank, and perform kitchen duties and yard work for JPC officers. Beginning in October 2001, the Indian workers were forced to live behind the gates of the company until escaping from the facility in February 2002 with the aid of area churches.

In her 71-page written opinion, issued in May 2006, Federal District Court Judge Claire V. Eagan detailed evidence of unlawful and egregious conduct by JPC against the Indian-born high-tech welders, fitters, electricians, engineers and cooks once they arrived in the U.S. The judge ruled that JPC subjected the Indian workers to fraud and deceit, inadequate pay, sub-standard living conditions, false imprisonment, lockdowns with an armed guard, phone tapping, food rationing, restrictions on freedom to worship, degrading job assignments, ethnic slurs, intimidation, and the non-payment of wages earned. The court concluded that this conduct violated Title VII of the Civil Rights Act of 1964, as amended, and 42 U.S.C. Section 1981, because the treatment was based on the national origin of the foreign workers.

Regional Attorney Canino added, “This case is a prime example of where the purposes of the U.S. anti-discrimination laws and immigration laws converge to protect both American and foreign workers with needed skills. American companies would be undermined by unfair competition if employers like JPC were allowed to engage in illegal schemes to obtain cheap foreign labor.”

Judge Eagan's 71-page decision followed two earlier trials and prior “Findings of Fact and Conclusions of Law” issued in August 2004. The EEOC's lawsuit was joined with a related civil action which had been filed by the workers on their own behalf alleging false imprisonment, minimum wage violations under the Fair Labor Standards Act (FLSA), deceit, and intentional infliction of emotional distress. (Chellen et al. and EEOC v. John Pickle Company, Inc., Case No. 02-CV-0085-CVE-FHM [Base File] and 02-CV-0979-CVE-FHM [Consolidated] in the U.S. District Court for the Northern District of Oklahoma). The total damages awarded by the Court addressed the claims in both the government's suit and the private action.

== Aftermath ==
In 2007, more than a year after the trial, the EEOC again pulled the John Pickle Co. into court, claiming that the company and its owner transferred assets to avoid paying the judgment to the claimants. The petition requested that a lien be placed on the company's assets to pay off the judgment.

Journalist and author John Bowe wrote and published a book in 2007 that tells the story of these proceedings and other instances of borderline slavery in modern America entitled, Nobodies: Modern American Slave Labor and the Dark Side of the New Global Economy. Bowe also appeared on the radio program This American Life, on November 30, 2007 (episode 344), talking about the Indian workers at John Pickle Company.
