= Intentional infliction of emotional distress =

Tort in common law

Intentional infliction of emotional distress (IIED; sometimes called the tort of outrage) is a common law tort that allows individuals to recover for severe emotional distress caused by another individual who intentionally or recklessly inflicted emotional distress by behaving in an "extreme and outrageous" way. Some courts and commentators have substituted mental for emotional, but the tort is the same.

== Rationale for classification ==
IIED was created in tort law to address a problem that would arise when applying the common law form of assault. The common law tort of assault does not allow for liability when a threat of battery is not imminent. A common case would be a future threat of harm that would not constitute common law assault but would nevertheless cause emotional harm to the recipient. IIED was created to guard against this kind of emotional abuse, thereby allowing a victim of emotional distress to receive compensation in situations where they would otherwise be barred from compensation under the common law form.

According to the first doctrine articulated by common law courts, a plaintiff could not recover for physical injury from fright alone absent a physical impact from an external source ("shock without impact"), even if the fright was proven to have resulted from a defendant's negligence, with the case on point referring to the negligent operation of a railroad in Australia, as decided by the imperial Privy Council. Even with intentional conduct, absent material damage, claims for emotional harm were similarly barred. "Mental pain or anxiety, the law cannot value and does not pretend to redress, when the unlawful act causes that alone. Though where a material damage occurs, and is connected with it, it is impossible a jury, in estimating it, should altogether overlook the feelings of the party interested." Courts had been reluctant to accept a tort for emotional harm for fear of opening a "wide door" to frivolous claims.

A change first occurred in the Irish courts, which repudiated the Australian railroad decision and recognised liability for "nervous shock" in the Byrne (1884) and Bell (1890) cases. In England, the idea that physical/mental shock without impact from an external source should be a bar to recovery was first questioned at the Queen's Bench in Pugh v. London, etc. Railroad Co. In the following year, the Court of Queen's Bench formally recognised the tort, for the first time, in the case of Wilkinson v Downton, although it was referred to as "intentional infliction of mental shock". Wilkinson has been subsequently approved by both the Court of Appeal (Janvier v Sweeney [1919] 2 KB 316) and House of Lords (Wainwright v Home Office [2003] UKHL 53, [2004] 2 AC 406). Citing Pugh and the Irish courts as precedent, the Wilkinson court noted the willful nature of the act as a direct cause of the harm.

== Elements ==
1. Defendant acted intentionally or recklessly; and
2. Defendant's conduct was extreme and outrageous; and
3. Defendant's act is the cause of the distress; and
4. Plaintiff suffers severe emotional distress as a result of defendant's conduct.

=== Intentional or reckless act ===
It is not necessary that an act be intentionally offensive. A reckless disregard for the likelihood of causing emotional distress is sufficient.

=== Extreme and outrageous conduct ===
The conduct must be heinous and beyond the standards of civilized decency or utterly intolerable in a civilized society. Whether the conduct is illegal does not determine whether it meets this standard. IIED is also known as the tort of "outrage", due to a classic formulation of the standard: the conduct must be such that it would cause a reasonable person to feel extremely offended, shocked, and/or outraged.

Factors that will persuade that the conduct was extreme and outrageous include:

- there was a pattern of conduct, not just an isolated incident
- the plaintiff was vulnerable and the defendant knew it
- the defendant was in a position of power
- racial epithets were used
- the defendant owed the plaintiff a fiduciary duty.

=== Causation ===
The actions of the defendant must have actually caused the plaintiff's emotional distress beyond the bounds of decency. IIED can be done through speech or action; if emotional stress, must manifest physically.

=== Qualification ===
The emotional distress suffered by the plaintiffs must be "severe". This standard is quantified by the intensity, duration, and any physical manifestations of the distress. A lack of productivity or a mental disorder, documented by a mental health professional, is typically required here, although acquaintances' testimony about a change in behavior could be persuasive. Extreme sadness, anxiety, or anger in conjunction with a personal injury (though not necessarily) may also qualify for compensation.

== Pleading practices ==
In civil procedure systems (such as in the United States) that allow plaintiffs to plead multiple alternative theories that may overlap or even contradict each other, a plaintiff will usually bring an action for both intentional infliction of emotional distress and negligent infliction of emotional distress (NIED). This is just in case the plaintiff later discovers that it is impossible to prove at trial the necessary intent; even then, the jury may still be able to rule for them on the NIED claim.

There are some reported cases in which a plaintiff will bring only a NIED claim even though a reasonable neutral observer could conclude that the defendant's behavior was probably intentional. This is usually because the defendant may have some kind of insurance coverage (like homeowners' insurance or automobile liability insurance). As a matter of public policy, insurers are barred from covering intentional torts like IIED, but may be liable for NIED committed by their policyholders, and therefore are targeted indirectly in this fashion as deep pockets.

== First Amendment considerations ==
The U.S. Supreme Court case Hustler v. Falwell involved an IIED claim brought by the evangelist Jerry Falwell against the publisher of Hustler Magazine for a parody ad that described Falwell as having lost his virginity to his mother in an outhouse. The Court ruled that the First Amendment protected such parodies of public figures from civil liability.

== See also ==
- Snyder v. Phelps
