= R (Nicklinson) v Ministry of Justice =

Case before UK Supreme Court regarding the right to die

- Court: Supreme Court of the United Kingdom
- Full case name: R (on the application of Nicklinson and another) (Appellants) v Ministry of Justice (Respondent)
- Argued: 16–19 December 2013
- Decided: 25 June 2014
- Neutral citation: [2014] UKSC 38

Case history
- Prior history: [2013] EWCA Civ 961; [2012] EWHC 2381 (Admin)

Holding
- Appeal dismissed, no declaration of incompatibility would be issued.

Case opinions
- Majority: Lords Neuberger, Mance, Clarke, Wilson, Sumption, Reed and Hughes
- Dissent: Lady Hale and Lord Kerr

Area of law
- Assisted suicide; Autonomy; Article 8, ECHR

R (Nicklinson) v Ministry of Justice was a 2014 judgment by the Supreme Court of the United Kingdom that considered the question of the right to die in English law.

== Facts ==
In 2005 Tony Nicklinson suffered a severe stroke and became paralysed from the neck down. He described his life following the stroke as a "living nightmare".

Nicklinson wished to end his life but was unable to commit suicide without assistance. This presented a legal problem because assisting the suicide of another person is a criminal offence under section 2 of the Suicide Act 1961. As such Nicklinson applied to the High Court for a declaration that either:

- It would be legal for a doctor to assist in his suicide; or
- The present legal regime concerning assisted suicide is incompatible with Article 8 of the European Convention on Human Rights (Right to respect for private and family life)

The second appeal in this case related to an individual using the pseudonym Martin who had suffered a brainstem stroke in 2008. Martin wished to end his life by travelling to the Dignitas clinic in Switzerland and sought an order for the Director of Public Prosecutions (DPP) to amend her 2010 'Policy for Prosecutors in Respect of Cases of Encouraging or Assisting Suicide' so that carers and other responsible individuals who are not family members will not be prosecuted for assisting in Martin's suicide.

== Judgment ==
=== High Court ===
The High Court refused both of the declarations that Nicklinson sought. He subsequently refused all food and died of pneumonia on 22 August 2012. His wife took up the case in the appeals to the Court of Appeal and Supreme Court.

Martin's claim also failed in the High Court.

=== Court of Appeal ===
The Court of Appeal dismissed Nicklinson's appeal on the basis that the defence of necessity should not be allowed to develop at common law so as to encompass murder in certain cases of euthanasia. Furthermore, a blanket ban on euthanasia was not incompatible with Article 8 of the European Convention on Human Rights. Such an approach was in line with the Debbie Purdy case.

Martin's appeal was partially successful. The court held that the DPP's guidance was not sufficiently clear in respect of people who had no close relationship with the victim.

Nicklinson and the DPP appealed to the Supreme Court. Martin cross-appealed.

=== Supreme Court ===
A majority of five justices (Neuberger, Hale, Mance, Kerr, Wilson) held that the court does have the constitutional authority to make a declaration of incompatibility as regards the general prohibition of assisted suicide. Lord Neuberger concluded:

76. [E]ven under our constitutional settlement, which acknowledges parliamentary supremacy and has no written constitution, it is, in principle, open to a domestic court to consider whether section 2 infringes article 8.

This majority felt that the question is one that Parliament is in a much better position than the courts to assess.

In a dissenting opinion, Lady Hale and Lord Kerr would have made a declaration of incompatibility as requested by Nicklinson. Lady Hale stated:

300. I have reached the firm conclusion that our law is not compatible with the Convention rights. Having reached that conclusion, I see little to be gained, and much to be lost, by refraining from making a declaration of incompatibility.

Although the other seven justices would not have issued such a declaration it was unanimously held that the question of assisted suicide does fall within the United Kingdom's margin of appreciation and does engage Article 8 of the European Convention on Human Rights.

The Supreme Court unanimously allowed the DPP's appeal and holds that:

249. Any lack of clarity or precision does not arise from the terms of the Director’s published policy. It arises from the discretionary character of the Director’s decision, the variety of relevant factors, and the need to vary the weight to be attached to them according to the circumstances of each individual case. All of these are proper and constitutionally necessary features of the system of prosecutorial discretion. The terms of the published policy reflect them. The document sets out the principal relevant factors for and against. It treats the professional character of an assister’s involvement as a factor tending in favour of prosecution. It is at least as clear as any sentencing guidelines for this offence could be.

Given this conclusion Martin's cross-appeal did not arise.

== European Court of Human Rights ==
In December 2014 Tony Nicklinson's wife, Jane, applied to bring a case before the European Court of Human Rights.

On 23 June 2015 the court decided that the question of assisted suicide falls within a state's margin of appreciation. It concluded that:

84. If the domestic courts were to be required to give a judgment on the merits of such a complaint this could have the effect of forcing upon them an institutional role not envisaged by the domestic constitutional order. Further, it would be odd to deny domestic courts charged with examining the compatibility of primary legislation with the Convention the possibility of concluding, like this Court, that Parliament is best placed to take a decision on the issue in question in light of the sensitive issues, notably ethical, philosophical and social, which arise.

As such Nicklinson's application was "manifestly ill-founded" and therefore declared inadmissible.

== Assisted Dying Bill ==
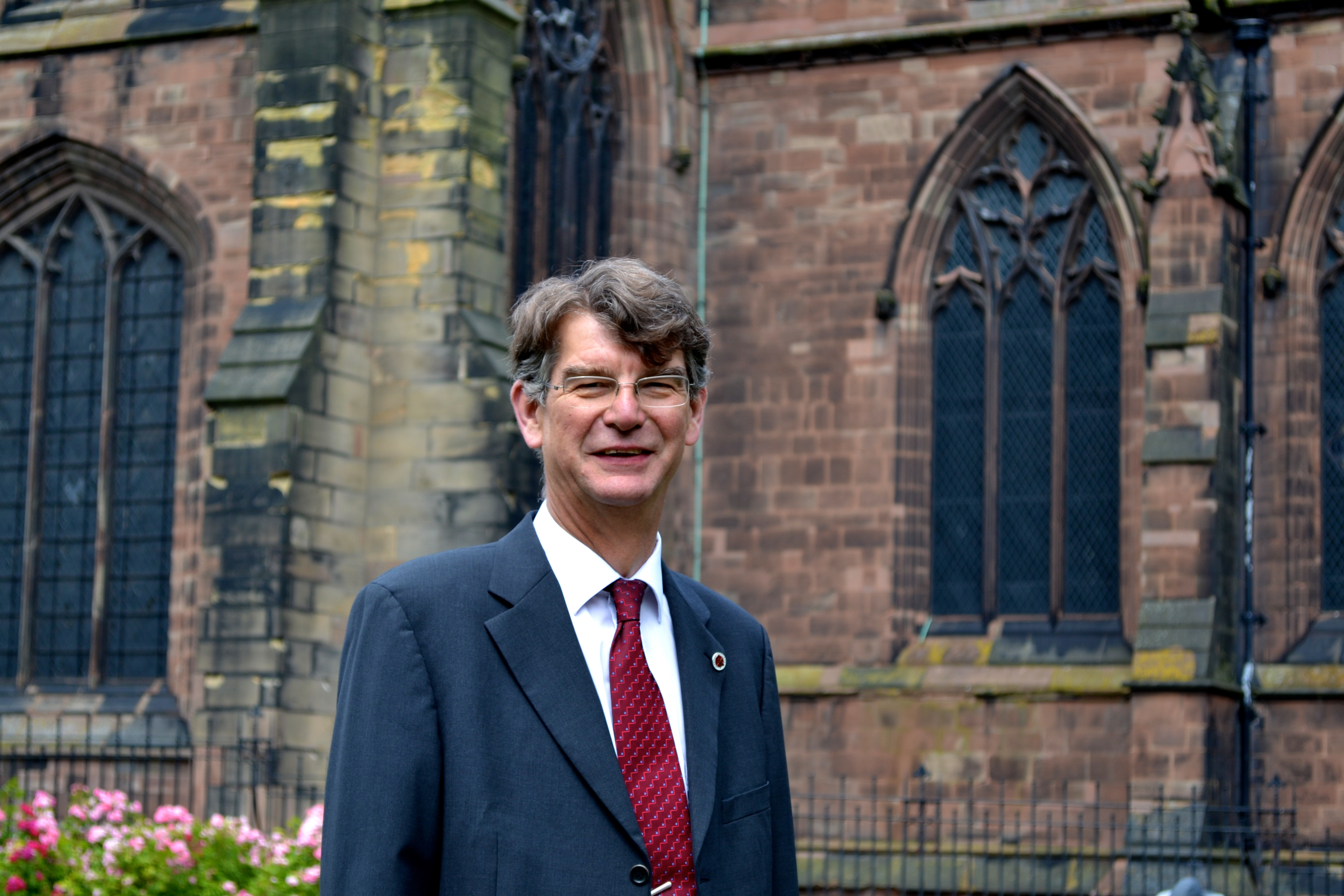
Labour MP Rob Marris introduced an Assisted Dying Bill in September 2015.

In June 2014 Lord Falconer tabled a private members' bill in the House of Lords entitled the "Assisted Dying Bill" but it ran out of debating time during that parliament.

In June 2015 Labour MP Rob Marris topped the ballot for private member's bills and indicated that he would introduce a bill that adopted Lord Falconer's draft regulations. Although Nicklinson was mentioned during the debates, the Assisted Dying Bill as proposed would have been limited to those with six months or less to live and therefore he would not have been able to utilise the law to access an assisted death. The bill failed to pass the second reading debate on 11 September 2015 as 118 MPs voted for the bill progressing while 330 voted against.

== See also ==
- Right to die
- Assisted suicide in the United Kingdom
- Autonomy
- Article 8 of the European Convention on Human Rights
- Tony Nicklinson
- 2014 Judgments of the Supreme Court of the United Kingdom
- Pretty v United Kingdom
