= Environmental Impact Assessment Directive 2011 =

The Environmental Impact Assessment Directive 2011 (2011/92/EU) is an EU directive relevant for European environmental law.

== Contents ==
Article 6 requires that planning authorities be consulted, and the "public shall be informed, whether by public notices or by other appropriate means such as electronic media where available" of the following:

*(a) the request for development consent;

- (b) the fact that the project is subject to an environmental impact assessment procedure and, where relevant, the fact that Article 7 applies;
- (c) details of the competent authorities responsible for taking the decision, those from which relevant information can be obtained, those to which comments or questions can be submitted, and details of the time schedule for transmitting comments or questions;
- (d) the nature of possible decisions or, where there is one, the draft decision;
- (e) an indication of the availability of the information gathered pursuant to Article 5;
- (f) an indication of the times and places at which, and the means by which, the relevant information will be made available;
- (g) details of the arrangements for public participation made pursuant to paragraph 5 of this Article.

== Significance ==
The EIAD 2011 was the subject of litigation in the UK constitutional law case of R (HS2 Action Alliance Ltd) v Secretary of State for Transport.

== See also ==
- UK enterprise law
- Oil and gas in the UK
