= Rare Objects (film) =

2023 film by Katie Holmes

Rare Objects is a 2023 American drama film co-written and directed by Katie Holmes. It stars Saundra Santiago, Derek Luke, Holmes and Alan Cumming. The film is based on Kathleen Tessaro's 2016 historical fiction novel Rare Objects.

== Plot ==
Benita Parla (Julia Mayorga) seeks to rebuild her life after starting work at an antique store. She regains her confidence while working with her kind employer Peter Kessler (Alan Cumming). At the same time, she also meets one of her friends Diana Van der Laar (Katie Holmes) who is living with mental illness. Benita starts to learn more about herself and others around her through friendship.

== Cast ==
- Julia Mayorga as Benita Parla
- Katie Holmes as Diana Van der Laar
- Saundra Santiago as Aymee Parla
- Derek Luke as Ben Winshaw
- Alan Cumming as Peter Kessler

== Release ==
The film was released in theatres on 14 April 2023. The movie grossed $10,454 for its theatrical release run.

== Reception ==
The film received mixed reviews from film critics. It holds a 43% approval rating on review aggregator website Rotten Tomatoes, based on 14 reviews. Calum Marsh of New York Times said, "At times a couple of pointlessly showy long takes add nothing and are a distraction."
