= Hammersmith and Fulham LBC v Monk =

1991 British legal case

Hammersmith & Fulham London Borough Council v Monk
- Court: House of Lords
- Full case name: Mayor etc. of the London Borough of Hammersmith and Fulham (Respondents) v. Monk (A.P.) (Appellant)
- Decided: 5 December 1991
- Citation: [1991] UKHL 6

Case history
- Prior actions: [1991] 61 P. & C.R. 414

Court membership
- Judges sitting: Lord Bridge of Harwich; Lord Brandon of Oakbrook; Lord Ackner; Lord Jauncey of Tullichettle; Lord Browne-Wilkinson

Keywords
- Joint tenancy

Hammersmith & Fulham LBC v Monk [1991] UKHL 6 is a House of Lords case concerning joint tenancies.

== Facts ==
Mr Monk and Mrs Powell had a weekly tenancy of a flat at 35 Niton Street, London SW6. Their landlord was Hammersmith and Fulham London Borough Council ("the council"). In 1988, Mr Monk and Mrs Powell fell out and Mrs Powell left. She asked the council for alternative accommodation and they agreed to re-house her if she would terminate the tenancy of 35 Niton Street. She gave four weeks' notice to end the tenancy without Mr Monk's knowledge or consent.

The council notified Mr Monk and sought to evict him. He declined to leave.

== Law ==
In a joint tenancy that is not a fixed term tenancy, notice to quit served by one joint tenant terminates the tenancy for all tenants. In a subsequent decision (Sims v Dacorum Borough Council) the Supreme Court confirmed that this does not violate any tenant's human rights.

== Courts below ==
In the County Court, the judge held that Mrs Powell's notice to quit was ineffective to end the tenancy and dismissed the claim. The Court of Appeal reversed this and made an order for possession.

== Judgment ==
Lord Bridge of Harwich in his review of the case law and authorities said:

... the application of ordinary contractual principles leads me to expect that a periodic tenancy granted to two or more joint tenants must be terminable at common law by an appropriate notice to quit given by any one of them whether or not the others are prepared to concur. But I turn now to the authorities to see whether there is any principle of the English Law of real property and peculiar to the contractual relationship of landlord and tenant which refutes that expectation or whether the authorities confirm it...

He went on to review legal authorities and cases including Doe d. Aslin v Summersett (1830) 1B. & Ad. 135; Doe d. Kindersley v Hughes (1840) 7M. & W. 139; Alford v. Vickery (1842) Car. & M. 280; Howson v. Buxton (1928) 97 L.J.K.B. 749; Leek and Moorlands Building Society v. Clark [1952] 2 Q.B. 788; Greenwich London Borough Council v. McGrady (1932) 46 P. &. C.R. 223; and a Scottish legal case, Smith v. Grayton Estates Ltd.. 1960 S.C. 249 and concluded:

... I agree with the Court of Appeal that, unless the terms of the tenancy agreement otherwise provide, notice to quit given by one joint tenant without the concurrence of any other joint tenant is effective to determine a periodic tenancy.

The other four judges agreed.
