= James Rhodes (pianist) =

British pianist

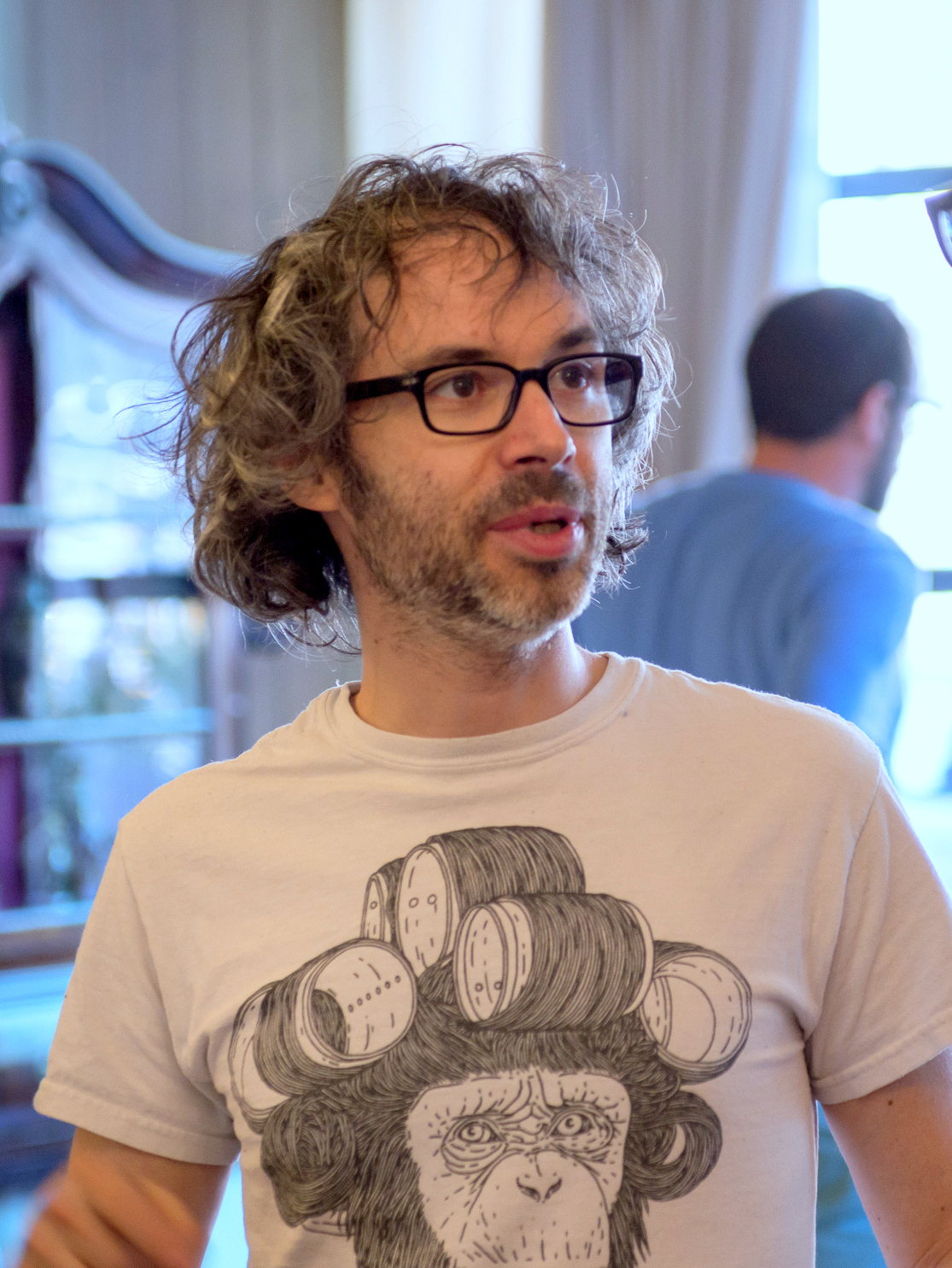
- Rhodes in 2016

Background information
- Born: James Edward Rhodes; 6 March 1975 (age 51); London, England
- Genres: Classical
- Instrument: Piano
- Years active: 2008–present
- Labels: Signum; Warner Bros.
- Website: jamesrhodes.tv

James Edward Rhodes (born 6 March 1975) is a British-Spanish concert pianist and writer, and an activist for the protection of minors against sexual abuse in Spain.

== Early life ==
James Edward Rhodes was born into a middle class Jewish family in St John's Wood, North London. He was educated at Arnold House School, a local all-boys private preparatory school. There, he experienced sexual abuse by his PE teacher, who died before he could appear in court. Rhodes suffered mentally as well as physically, including spinal damage, eating disorders and PTSD.

Aged 7, he found a cassette tape of Bach's "Chaconne" conducted by Busoni in his father's music collection: "Above all, it made him feel like even if it seemed as if the world really was a hostile and appalling place, it couldn’t be that bad because something this beautiful existed in it." He started to take piano lessons at the age of 14, but did not progress formally beyond Grade 3. First moving to a local boarding school, he was educated at Harrow School, where he studied under piano teacher Colin Stone. It was during this period that he entered the BBC Young Musician of the Year competition, but failed to make it past the second round.

In 1993, he was offered a scholarship to the Guildhall School of Music and Drama, but his parents insisted that he attend a “proper university”. At the age of 18, Rhodes quit playing the piano for 10 years.

== Career ==
A fan of the Russian pianist Grigory Sokolov, Rhodes wrote to Sokolov's agent Franco Panozzo in Italy, with the idea that Rhodes would become a music agent himself. Panozzo responded, and after Rhodes sent him a bottle of Champagne Krug, the pair arranged to meet in Italy. After hearing Rhodes play one of Frédéric Chopin's études, Panozzo arranged for Rhodes to study under the renowned piano teacher Edoardo Strabbioli in Verona, Italy for three to four years. However, after a period Rhodes was institutionalised.

In March 2010, Rhodes became the first core classical pianist to be signed to the world's largest rock label, Warner Bros. Records. In 2011, Rhodes became a regular culture blogger for The Telegraph, and had popular articles in The Guardian Music Blog in 2013. Returning to his original label Signum Classics, Rhodes released his 4th album JIMMY: James Rhodes recorded live at The Old Market Brighton in May 2012. He has since released three more albums. In 2015 Rhodes's autobiography, Instrumental: A Memoir of Madness, Medication and Music, was blocked from publication by a temporary court injunction prompted by his former wife. She said that publishing the book, which includes details of sexual abuse as a child, would psychologically harm their child. In May 2015, the Supreme Court decided in Rhodes v OPO that the book qualifies for free speech protection and lifted the interim injunction.

He has published three more books since then: How to Play the Piano in 2016 and Fire on all Sides in January 2018, followed by James Rhodes' Playlist: The Rebels and Revolutionaries of Sound, in October 2019.

=== Concerts ===
Rhodes's first public recital was at Steinway Hall in London, on 7 November 2008. His second recital was at the Hinde Street Methodist Centre, London, on 4 December 2008. He performed his first full-scale concert at the Queen Elizabeth Hall, Southbank Centre, in London on 6 February 2009. In May 2009, Rhodes performed a solo concert at The Roundhouse in Camden, the first classical musician to give a solo recital since the reopening. Rhodes has also played Proud Galleries in Camden; 100 Club in Soho; Tabernacle, Notting Hill and the nominations launch for the Classical BRIT Awards 2009 WITH NS&I. In March 2010, Rhodes performed at the Holders Season 2010 in Barbados. In summer 2010 he was the first solo classical pianist to play the Latitude Festival, sharing stages with acts such as Florence + the Machine and The National.

In September 2011 he performed alongside Stephen Fry in A Classical Affair at the Barbican Centre. In October 2011 Rhodes performed an 11-date tour in Australia, including three performances at the Melbourne Festival. Rhodes had his US debut in September 2012 at the International Beethoven Festival in Chicago. In 2013, he performed in Hong Kong, Vienna, the Barber Institute in Birmingham, the Royal Albert Hall, the Cheltenham Music Festival, the Waterfront stage at Latitude Festival and a series of concerts at Soho Theatre in London. A live in-concert DVD, Love in London, was recorded at the Arts Theatre in London's West End in 2014. That year he also performed at Hay Festival, Harrogate International Festivals, Canterbury Festival, London Ambassadors Theatre, St George's Hall in Bristol, Watford Colosseum, Leeds Town Hall, Manchester RNCM and had two runs at Soho Theatre.

He has performed in some of the world's greatest concert halls, selling out the Elbphilharmonie twice, the Palau de la Música Catalana, the Teatro Real, both the Palau and the Belles Artes Valencia, and halls in Argentina, Colombia, America, Europe and Mexico. 2019 saw him touring throughout Germany, including the Berlin Philharmonie and an extensive tour of Spain.

=== Television ===
In 2009 Rhodes completed filming a BBC Four music documentary, Chopin - The Women Behind The Music, to celebrate Frédéric Chopin's 200th anniversary and his relationship with the opera singer Jenny Lind. This documentary was broadcast in October 2010. Rhodes filmed a seven-episode series called James Rhodes: Piano Man.

In July 2013, he presented Notes from the Inside, with James Rhodes on Channel 4 as part of their Mad4Music season of programmes, in which each episode featured musicians from across the musical spectrum giving an alternative take on music and what it means to them and others around them; for example the second episode featured Björk being interviewed by Sir David Attenborough. During his episode, he both gave some insights into his personal life and played piano to four individual patients, all dealing with their own mental health issues, inside their psychiatric hospital by selecting a piece for each of them to match their personalities and individual circumstances,

Rhodes filmed a two-part campaigning series called Don't Stop the Music (working title The Great Instrument Amnesty) that was aired on Channel 4 in September 2014, with the aim of improving music education across the UK. The multiplatform project included an instrument amnesty which collected over 7,000 instruments (worth over £1.5M) to redistribute to 150 UK primary schools, benefiting 10,000 students a year.

== Personal life ==
Rhodes currently lives in Madrid, Spain, where he has campaigned to update Spanish laws regarding child sexual abuse. In December 2020, the Spanish Council of Ministers granted him Spanish citizenship.

In 2001, Rhodes married novelist Kathleen Tessaro; Rhodes married his second wife, Hattie Chamberlin, in 2014. He married his third wife, Micaela Breque, in 2021. He has a son from his first marriage.

Rhodes is a close friend of actor Benedict Cumberbatch, who attended Harrow School at the same time as he did.

In 2026, Rhodes offered to pay for the mental and physical healthcare of rape victim Noelia Castillo, trying to convince her to refrain from getting euthanised. However, the euthanasia was performed on 26 March 2026.

== Discography ==
Albums

- Razor Blades, Little Pills and Big Pianos (Feb 2009), Signum Records
- Now Would All Freudians Please Stand Aside (Mar 2010), Signum Records
- Bullets and Lullabies (Dec 2010), Warner Music Cover art by Dave Brown, Bollo from The Mighty Boosh
- JIMMY: James Rhodes Live in Brighton (May 2012), Signum Records
- 5 (Jun 2014), Instrumental Records
- Inside Tracks - the mix tape (Oct 2015), Instrumental Records
- Fire on All Sides (Nov 2017), Instrumental Records
- Vitamin C (Mar 2023), Instrumental Records
