= Leaseback =

Financial transaction

Leaseback, short for "sale-and-leaseback", is a financial transaction in which one sells an asset and leases it back for the long term; therefore, one continues to be able to use the asset but no longer owns it. The transaction is generally done for fixed assets, notably real estate, as well as for durable and capital goods such as airplanes and trains. The concept can also be applied by national governments to territorial assets; prior to the Falklands War, the government of the United Kingdom proposed a leaseback arrangement whereby the Falklands Islands would be transferred to Argentina, with a 99-year leaseback period, and a similar arrangement, also for 99 years, had been in place prior to the handover of Hong Kong to mainland China. Leaseback arrangements are usually employed because they confer financing, accounting or taxation benefits.

== Leaseback arrangements ==
After purchasing an asset, the owner enters a long-term agreement by which the property is leased back to the seller at an agreed rate. One reason for a leaseback is to transfer ownership to a holding company while keeping proper track of the ongoing worth and profitability of the asset. Another reason is for the seller to raise money by offloading a valuable asset to a buyer who is presumably interested in making a long-term secured investment. Leaseback arrangements are common in the REIT industry.

=== Possible solution to toxic banking assets ===
According to Robert Peston, one-time Business Editor for the BBC, one option being considered for dealing with the subprime mortgage crisis is a sale-and-leaseback of toxic assets. Peston says "a sale-and-leaseback between the banks and the state has two supreme advantages: there's no need to value the poisonous assets; and losses on those stinky assets would be absorbed by the banks in manageable chunks over about 10 years."

=== Real estate ===
Leaseback arrangements are popular in France, the United States, United Kingdom, and throughout Australia and Asia, including, more recently, in India.

==== France ====
Leaseback of residential property has been popular in France for more than 30 years, and there are significant tax advantages. Under the scheme, the purchaser may use the property usually between 1 and 8 weeks per year (with a maximum of 6 months per year). The French government encourages the development of leaseback schemes in touristic areas to alleviate shortages in rental accommodation. The government rebates the local VAT (which is 19.6%), when the property is purchased off plan.

The scheme works by purchasing a freehold property. You become the legal owner. The property is then leased back to the developer or a management company. Under the leaseback scheme the government also refunds to you the VAT normally charged on a new build properties (currently 19.6%).

The owner is then guaranteed a rental income throughout the period of the lease. The net return to the owner varies between developments but is typically between 4% and 6%. This compares very favourably with a typical 20 year fixed rate mortgage of around 3.75%, and variable rate mortgages which are lower. It can be seen how the rental income can be used in respect of the mortgage payments. Loans of between 75% and 85% are available depending upon circumstances. The rental yield is also index linked annually to construction costs, which means the rental income currently increases by approximately 2.5%.

As in the UK there are tax allowances in respect of mortgage payments which can be offset against income. The lease typically lasts for between 9 and 11 years, after which the management company has the option to either renew, or the property can be sold, or rented out and held privately by the owner.

The purchaser/owner can also enjoy periods of usage free of charge through the year, depending upon the terms of the lease. These terms normally allows for between 4 and 6 weeks free usage each year. The management company is responsible for the maintenance of the property including the maintenance of furnishings which are often included in the purchase price. The developer is also responsible for insuring the building and its contents. It also pays for some of the property taxes and all the utility costs.

==== United Kingdom ====
In the United Kingdom, a form of leaseback known as sale and rent back was the subject of a 2014 Supreme Court case that found many such arrangements had been perpetrated fraudulently.

==== United States ====
A "sale/leaseback" or "sale and leaseback" is a transaction in which the owner of a property sells an asset, typically real estate, and then leases it back from the buyer. In this way the transaction functions as a loan, with payments taking the form of rent. Due to the lack of financing available in today's market, many American businesses are increasingly turning to sale-and-leasebacks to provide quick capital. For example, developers of master-planned communities will often sell the model home to a buyer before the community is sold out, leasing it back from the buyer for a period of up to two years. In some arrangements, the current lessee will give the option to buy the asset back at the end of the lease. Typically, if the original owner were to buy back the asset, it would take place at the end of the tax year, in case any party were to be audited by the IRS.

==== Other countries ====
The leaseback concept has spread to other European countries, including Spain and Switzerland. Typical property available are studios, apartments, and villas. They are situated near ski areas, beach resorts, or golf courses.

== Commercial real estate ==
A sale-and-leaseback is typically a commercial real estate transaction in which one party, often a corporation, sells its corporate real estate assets to another party, such as an institutional investor, or a real estate investment trust (REIT), and then leases the property back at a rental rate and lease term that is acceptable to the new investor/landlord. The lease term and rental rate are based on the new investor/landlord's financing costs, the lessee's credit rating, and a market rate of return, based on the initial cash investment by the new investor/landlord.

The reasons and advantages for a seller/lessee are varied, but the most common are:

- Help finance expansion of the existing business, purchase new plant equipment, or invest in new business opportunities. A sale leaseback enables a corporation to access more capital than traditional financing methods. When the real estate is sold to an outside investor, the corporation receives 100% of the value of the property. Traditional financing is limited to a loan-to-value ratio or debt-coverage-ratio.
- Help pay down debt and improve the company's balance sheet.
- Help reduce the seller/lessee's business income tax liability caused by the appreciation in value (land only) of its corporate real estate assets. In addition, the seller/lessee as a tenant can deduct all rent payments as a legitimate business expense on its annual tax returns.
- Helps limit risks associated with owning real estate such as cyclical market variations.

The advantages for an investor/landlord are:

- Fair return on the investment in the form of rent during the lease term, and ownership of a depreciable asset already occupied by a reliable tenant.
- Long-term, fully leased asset with a guaranteed income stream.
- For income-tax purposes, the investor/landlord can take an expense deduction for an investment in a depreciable property to allow for the recovery of the cost of the investment.
- Ability to invest in real estate with a tenant who is already familiar with the property.

== Aviation ==
Leaseback is also commonly used in general aviation, with buyers using the scheme to let flight schools and other FBOs use their aircraft.

Leaseback is very often used in commercial aviation to essentially take back the cash invested in assets. Airlines, for example, sell aircraft and engines to lessors, banks or other financial institutions who, in turn, lease the assets back to them. Due to the high price of aircraft and engines, especially new, the cash from such a leaseback is used by airlines to improve their financial performance.

== Industrial equipment ==
The leaseback concept has also spread to industry, mostly for industrial equipment. A long-standing example is the railroad industry, in which locomotives and other rolling stock are purchased on behalf of the railroad by an 'equipment trust' set up by a bank, financing the original purchase cost with the lease payments. A company sells some of its equipment to a lessor, such as a bank or another financial institution, which leases the equipment back to the company. Thus the company is no longer the owner of the equipment but keeps the use of it. This commercial transaction allows two companies to have at their immediate disposal the cash to make investments in new business opportunities.

== See also ==
- Aircraft lease
- Lease-option
- Rent-to-own
