= Sims v Dacorum Borough Council =

2014 British legal case

- Court: Supreme Court of the United Kingdom
- Full case name: Sims (Appellant) v Dacorum Borough Council (Respondent) and Secretary of State for Communities and Local Government (Interested Party)
- Decided: 12 November 2014
- Citation: [2014] UKSC 63

Case history
- Prior action: Sims v Dacorum Borough Council [2013] EWCA 12

Court membership
- Judges sitting: Lord Neuberger; Lady Hale; Lord Clarke; Lord Wilson; Lord Carnwath; Lord Toulson; Lord Hodge

Keywords
- Joint tenancy

Sims v Dacorum Borough Council [2014] UKSC 63 is a UK Supreme Court case concerning joint tenancies.

== Facts ==
Michael and Sharon Sims, a married couple, lived with their four children in a three bedroom house at 5, Dunny Lane, Chipperfield, Kings Langley under a joint secure weekly tenancy. Their landlord was Dacorum Borough Council ("Dacorum").

Mr and Mrs Sims took occupation in 2002 under a tenancy granted 15 March 2002. In 2009, after Mr Sims was said to have committed domestic violence against one of his sons, Mrs Sims decided to move out. She quit the property in March 2010 with the couple's two youngest children and moved into a women's refuge. She asked a different council, Wycombe District Council ("Wycombe"), for accommodation. Mr Sims remained living at the house with his older two children.

Wycombe told Mrs Sims that she must give up her existing tenancy before she could qualify. So, on 25 June 2010, Mrs Sims served a notice to quit on Dacorum terminating the tenancy on 26 July 2010.

On 28 October 2010, Dacorum began proceedings in the County Court to gain possession of the house. The proceedings were delayed while Dacorum carried out two internal reviews, and finally came to trial on 2 December 2011. Deputy District Judge Wood decided in favour of Dacorum in a judgment dated 16 December 2011.

== Law ==
In the 1991 House of Lords case of Hammersmith and Fulham LBC v Monk ("Hammersmith & Fulham"), it was decided that in a joint tenancy that is not a fixed term tenancy, notice to quit served by one joint tenant terminates the tenancy for all tenants. The question in this case was whether this is compatible with the subsequently-passed Human Rights Act 1998.

== Courts below ==
Deputy District Judge Wood in 2011, and a Court of Appeal comprising Mummery LJ, Etherton LJ, and Sir Scott Baker in 2013, both ruled that the decision in Hammersmith & Fulham was compatible with the Human Rights Act.

== Judgment ==
The Supreme Court unanimously agreed with the courts below. Accordingly, the appeal was dismissed.
