= Rare Objects =

2016 novel by Kathleen Tessaro

- First edition (US)
- Author: Kathleen Tessaro
- Language: English
- Genre: Historical Fiction
- Publisher: Harper
- Publication date: April 12, 2016
- Publication place: United States
- Media type: Print (Hardcover)(Kindle)
- Pages: 400
- ISBN: 978-0062357540
- Preceded by: The Perfume Collector

Rare Objects is a 2016 historical fiction novel by American author Kathleen Tessaro. The book was released on April 12, 2016 through Harper and is Tessaro's sixth published novel. Katie Holmes adapted the book into a screenplay and went on to produce, direct, and act in the film, which opened in theaters and online streaming on April 14, 2023.

== Synopsis ==
The book follows Maeve, who wants to be more than just the child of Irish immigrants – something made more difficult by the Great Depression. However, despite her attempts Maeve cannot keep herself away from the fast men and easy alcohol that ends up landing her in a mental asylum. It's there that she meets Diana, a young woman with an equally large hunger for freedoms not usually allowed women of the era. After she leaves Maeve manages to pick up the pieces of her life and begins working at an antiques shop, where she runs into Diana, who Maeve discovers is a socialite. Still eager to improve herself, Maeve lets Diana and her brother James draw her into their world, something that might end up proving to be disastrous for the young woman.

== Reception ==
Publishers Weekly wrote a mostly favorable review for Rare Objects, stating that "Tessaro’s complicated heroines—and the shattering reveal of secret after secret—will keep readers guessing until the final page." The book was also reviewed by Booklist and the Library Journal.

Kirkus Reviews wrote "This novel meanders more than the Odyssey to which it frequently pays homage." The Historical Novel Society, based in the US and UK, gave a review specific to the genre, "This gutsy, absorbing story about self-deception and belonging is remarkable in its honesty. The settings exude authenticity, both the scenes of immigrant family life in Boston’s North End and upper-crust society parties, which never go as perfectly as its organizers hope. The story bounces around time-wise in the beginning, and more details on Maeve’s future plans would have been nice. The wanting more of a novel, though, that’s a good sign. Tessaro is a natural storyteller, and her story goes where it needs to without being predictable. The result is a compelling tale that reads like real life."
