= Robert Samuel Wright =

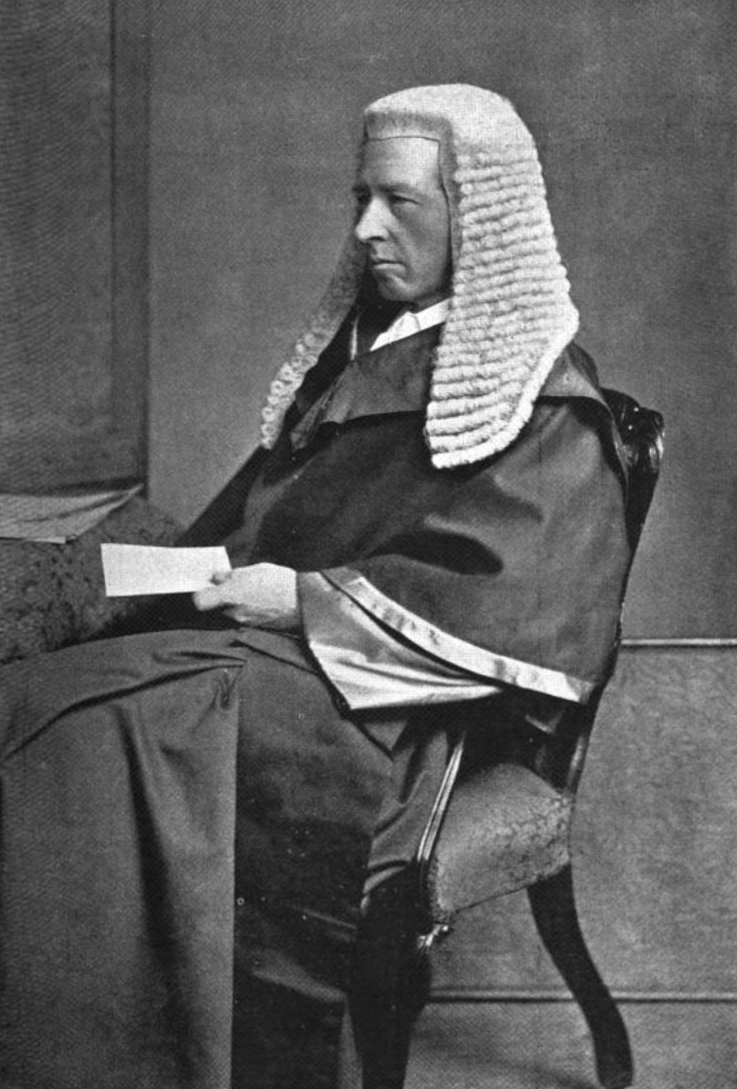
In The Sketch, 27 May 1896

Sir Robert Samuel Wright (20 January 1839 – 13 August 1904) was a 19th-century Justice of the British High Court, Queen's Bench Division.

== Life and career ==
Wright was born at the rectory in Litton, Somerset, the son of the Rev H. E. Wright and his wife, who was the daughter of a clergyman. The son showed no inclination to follow an ecclesiastical calling. He matriculated as a commoner at Balliol College, Oxford at the unusually early age of seventeen. He became one the favourite pupils of the Master of the college, Benjamin Jowett, and was later a close and lifelong friend. He won several prestigious prizes and graduated with first class honours in 1860. He was elected as a fellow of Oriel College, Oxford, and for the next few years divided his time between academic work and studying for the legal profession. He was called to the bar by the Inner Temple in June 1865.

As a young lawyer, Wright made a mark with well-received publications on legal topics including the laws of conspiracy, possession, local government and taxation. His practice as a barrister flourished, and in 1883 he was appointed Junior Counsel to the Treasury, in succession to A. L. Smith. Wright prosecuted in that year's Fenian dynamite trials. He also appeared for the petitioner in the Dilke divorce case of 1886. The Junior Counsel to the Treasury was often described as "the Attorney General's devil", and one of the Attorneys General whom he served commented, "Wright has the whole law of England at his fingers' ends". In this, Wright was at first assisted by his own junior, H. H. Asquith, whose legal and political career took off with his appointment by Wright.

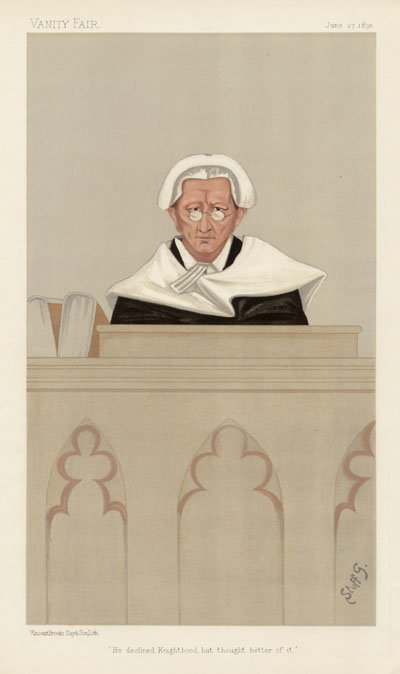
"He declined a Knighthood but thought better of it", caricature by "Stuff" in Vanity Fair, 1891

In 1870, Wright was asked by the Colonial Office to draft a criminal code for Jamaica which could be used as a model criminal code for other colonies. Although ultimately not adopted in Jamaica, it was adopted in several other British colonies, and came to be highly regarded.

Holding strong Liberal views, Wright stood unsuccessfully for Parliament in 1884 and 1886. His liberal views may have been an impedance to his later judicial career. Holders of the post of Junior Counsel to the Treasury were traditionally elevated from the post straight to the judicial bench, without becoming a Queen's Counsel. In 1890, on the death of Baron Huddleston Wright was appointed as a judge of the Queen's Bench. He initially declined the knighthood that customarily went with the appointment, but later accepted it.

Among Wright's important judgments was that in the case of Wilkinson v. Downton (1897), and his views played an important part in Allen v Flood [1898]. Despite his legal talents he was not appointed to the Court of Appeal; the obituarist in The Times speculated that this may have been due to his politics at a time when a Conservative Lord Chancellor controlled judicial appointments.

Wright married in 1891. His wife Mabel Emily, née Chermside, was the daughter of a clergyman. There were two sons of the marriage; one died in infancy and the other, Sir Michael Wright, became a senior diplomat.

Wright died at his country house, Headley Park, Hampshire at the age of 65.

== Books ==
Wright wrote or co-wrote a number of books on legal matters and classic literature, which included:

- The Genius of Chaucer: A Prize Essay (1861) - (reprinted in Paperback, 2009)
- The Golden Treasury of Ancient Greek poetry (1867)
- The Law of Criminal Conspiracies and Agreements (1887) (co-author: Hampton Lawrence Carson)
- An Essay on Possession in the Common law (1888) (co-author: Sir Frederick Pollock)
