= R (British Sky Broadcasting Ltd) v Comr of Police of the Metropolis =

R (British Sky Broadcasting Ltd) v The Commissioner of Police of the Metropolis
- Court: Supreme Court of the United Kingdom
- Argued: 3 December 2013
- Decided: 12 March 2014
- Neutral citation: [2014] UKSC 17
- Reported at: UKSC 2012/0115

Case history
- Prior action: Al Rawi v The Security Service 2011:[2012] AC 531, R v Lewes Crown Court ex parte Hill (1991) 93 Cr App R 60, 65-6

Holding
- Appeal dismissed

Court membership
- Judges sitting: Lady Hale and Lords Toulson, Reed, Hughes and Kerr

Case opinions
- Decision by: Lord Toulson
- Concurrence: Lady Hale and Lords Reed, Hughes and Kerr

Area of law
- Official Secrets Act, Police and Criminal Evidence Act, equal treatment

R (British Sky Broadcasting Ltd) v Central Criminal Court [2014] UKSC 17 was a 2014 judgment of the Supreme Court of the United Kingdom. The court held that as inter partes proceedings created a lis between the parties (per Lewes), equal treatment (per Al Rawi) meant that ex parte evidence in general could not be adduced.

== Facts ==
Two army officers, B and D had been passing information from the COBRA committee to British Sky Broadcasting Ltd (B Sky B) in the person of Sam Kiley.

The Commissioner of the Metropolitan Police (the Commissioner) had made an inter partes application for a production order, to the circuit judge. Certain evidence was offered ex parte over the objections of B Sky B. The judge granted the order, and B Sky B applied to the Administrative Court for a judicial review. The Administrative Court quashed the production order ([2011] EWHC 3451 (Admin)).

Proceedings against the officers were dropped, but because of the importance of the legal argument, the Commissioner appealed.

== Judgment ==
In the Supreme Court, arguments were heard from the parties to the case.

Lord Toulson, with whom the other members agreed, said that the general power of a magistrate to issue a search warrant on ex parte application of a police officer, given reasonable belief that an indictable offence had taken place and that there was material likely to be of substantial value to the investigation on the premises, section 14 of the Police and Criminal Evidence Act 1984 mean that journalistic material was classed as "special procedural material" and did not fall under the general power. Application had been made under both the general and the "special material" sets of access conditions, and only the "special material" set was applicable.

Special material, fell under section 9 and Schedule 1, and the application consequently had to be made inter partes and to a circuit judge.

The issue was whether the court might have regard evidence given by the applicant but not disclosed to the respondent.

The principle in Al Rawi that, as a general rule, a respondent should have access to evidence on which the case was based applied to criminal and civil trials, did not extend to applications to obtain evidence from a third party whose substantive legal rights were not involved.

However, since the hearing was inter partes a discrete, substantive legal issue arose. Equal treatment meant that the crown court judge should not have taken into account the ex parte evidence.

Therefore the divisional court was correct to quash the order, and the appeal was dismissed.

== Solicitors ==
Directorate of Legal Services, Metropolitan Police; Goodman Derrick LLP
