= Janvier v Sweeney =

- Court: Court of Appeal of England and Wales
- Decided: 1919
- Citation: 2 KB 316

Janvier v Sweeney [1919] 2 KB 316 is a decision by the English Court of Appeal which held that the defendant was liable for illness resulting from nervous shock caused by false words and threats.

== Facts ==
A private detective told a woman that he was a police detective and that she was wanted for communicating with a German spy. He did this in order to obtain certain information about her employer. The woman suffered shock and nervous illness as a result of this statement.

== Judgment ==
Applying the rule in Wilkinson v Downton, the court ruled that the detective was liable for the nervous shock to the plaintiff, who had an even stronger case than in Wilkinson v Downton, since there was a clear intention to frighten the victim in order to unlawfully obtain information.

== See also ==
- Wilkinson v Downton
- Nervous shock (English Law)
