= Wainwright v Home Office =

Legal case in the United Kingdom

- Court: House of Lords
- Full case name: Wainwright & Anor v. Home Office
- Decided: 16 October 2003
- Citations: [2003] UKHL 53; [2004] 2 AC 406; [2003] 3 WLR 1137; [2004] UKHRR 154; [2003] 4 All ER 969; 15 BHRC 387
- Cases cited: Wilkinson v Downton [1897] EWHC 1 (QB), [1897] 2 QB 57 (8 May 1897)

Case history
- Prior action: Home Office v Mary Jane Wainwright & Anor [2001] EWCA Civ 2081 (20 December 2001)

Court membership
- Judges sitting: Lord Bingham of Cornhill; Lord Hoffmann; Lord Hope of Craighead; Lord Hutton; Lord Scott of Foscote

Keywords
- Battery, privacy, emotional distress

Wainwright v Home Office [2003] UKHL 53, [2004] 2 AC 406 is an English tort law case concerning the arguments for a tort of privacy, and the action for battery.

== Facts ==
Alan Wainwright, along with his mother, went to visit his stepbrother, who was detained in Leeds Prison awaiting trial. Because the stepbrother was suspected of taking drugs in jail, both visitors were asked to consent to a strip search under Rule 86(1) of the Prison Rules 1964 (consolidated 1998), which grants prison authorities a power to search any person entering a prison. They reluctantly consented and were searched by prison officers, which they found upsetting. In particular, Alan Wainwright was handled in a way that Home Office counsel that later conceded was battery.

The Wainwrights then consulted a solicitor, who arranged for them to be examined by a psychiatrist. The psychiatrist concluded that Alan, who had physical and learning difficulties, had been so severely affected by his experience that he suffered post-traumatic stress syndrome. Mrs Wainwright had suffered emotional distress but no recognised psychiatric illness.

== Judgment ==
At Leeds County Court, the judge held that the searches were wrongful (and hence not protected by statutory authority) because of the battery and invasion of the Wainwrights' "right to privacy", which he conceived to be a trespass to the person. He awarded Alan Wainwright £3,500 basic and £1,000 aggravated damages, and Mrs Wainwright £1,600 basic and £1,000 aggravated damages.

The Court of Appeal did not agree with the judge's extensions of the notion of trespass to the person and did not consider that apart from the battery, which was unchallenged, the prison officers had committed any wrongful act. It thus set aside the judgments in favour of the Wainwrights with the exception of the damages for battery, which it valued at £3,750.

The plaintiffs appealed to the House of Lords. Lord Hoffmann held that there was no tort for invasion of privacy because, based on experience in the United States, it was too uncertain. Moreover, a claim under Article 8 of the European Convention on Human Rights (ECHR), for the right to privacy and a family life, did not help because the ECHR was merely a standard that applied to whatever was already present in the common law. Common-law protection was sufficient privacy protection for the ECHR's purpose. The assertion that there may have been a breach of Article 3 (inhuman and degrading treatment) was completely unfounded. He also held that there was no claim for a tort of intention to cause harm under the Wilkinson v Downton case.

In Lord Scott's opinion, the way that the strip searches were carried out had humiliated and caused distress to both Mrs Wainwright and to Alan and was "calculated (in an objective sense)" to do so, even if that was not the intention of the prison officers. However, that was not tortious at common law even if the humiliation and distress were intended.

The appeal was dismissed unanimously by the Law Lords.
