= AIB Group (UK) plc v Mark Redler & Co Solicitors =

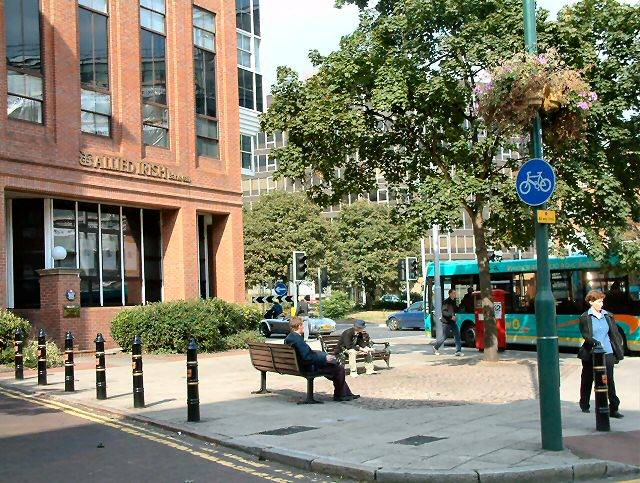
- An Allied Irish Bank branch
- Court: UK Supreme Court
- Decided: 5 November 2014
- Citation: [2014] UKSC 58

Keywords
- Contract, remedies

AIB Group (UK) plc v Mark Redler & Co Solicitors [2014] UKSC 58 is an English trust law case, concerning the applicable principles of causation for a breach of trust.

== Facts ==
The case concerned four parties: the Sondhi family (borrower); AIB Group (second lender); Barclays Bank (first lender); and Redler (solicitors to Sondhi and AIB). At trial, the claimant is AIB and the defendants are Redler.

The Sondhis had a property that was mortgaged to Barclays. They wanted to take on a second loan with AIB, with this loan also being secured by their property. AIB and the Sondhis agreed that the mortgage with Barclays would be redeemed, and a new mortgage will be created in favour of AIB. The solicitors, however, in facilitating these transactions, made a mistake. They believed that the redemption figure that was to be paid was lower than what it actually was. As such, they executed what they believed was a first legal charge over the property, in favour of AIB, after they had paid the lesser sum to Barclays.

Consequently, Barclays' original charge was not released. The solicitors tried to fix their mistakes, first working only with Barclays and the Sondhis, and later informing AIG, who began negotiations with Barclays. Both banks later agreed that Barclays' charge would have primacy and that AIG would have a second charge over the property. The Sondhis later defaulted on their payment, leading Barclays to repossess and sell the property.

=== Issues of law ===
AIG thereafter sued Redler for breach of trust, fiduciary duty, and contract, as well as in negligence. They sought relief in the forms of reconstitution of the trust fund, equitable compensation, and damages. They sought to reclaim the full sum that they had loaned to the Sondhis. The solicitors, on the other hand, argued that they should only pay the difference between AIG's present losses and the losses AIG would have suffered if the solicitors had paid the actual redemption figure to Barclays.

== See also ==
- English trusts law
