= Hounga v Allen =

- Court: House of Lords
- Citation: [2014] UKSC 47

Hounga v Allen [2014] UKSC 47 is a UK labour law case, concerning the right to equal treatment, wages, and the illegality principle.

== Facts ==
Mary Hounga sued Adenike Allen, the employer, for damages under race discrimination after dismissal under the Race Relations Act 1976 (in subsequent proceedings replaced with the Equality Act 2010, although the events at issue happened before it came into force). Hounga was brought to the UK fraudulently as the granddaughter of Mrs Allen, who used Hounga illegally as a domestic servant from January 2007 in Allen’s home in Hanworth, Middlesex. She was probably 14 years old, although her passport had been obtained fraudulently in Lagos, Nigeria by Mrs Allen, and so her true age was unknown. She had not received comprehensive education, and was assessed as having learning difficulties, but could speak English well. Hounga cared for Mrs Allen’s actual three smaller children. A contract of employment would have been a criminal offence under section 24(1)(b)(ii) of the Immigration Act 1971. Hounga, although a child, was found to have known that coming to the UK was unlawful. She was never paid as she was originally promised, and while living with the family Allen beat and abused Hounga, until July 2008 when she was kicked out of the house, had water poured on her, and slept in her wet clothes in the front garden. When she tried to get back in at 7am and nobody answered, she went to the supermarket carpark, where she was found and taken to social services. She was given the assistance of the UK Human Trafficking Centre.

Hounga also brought a claim for unpaid wages, but this was dropped in the first instances of the litigation, leaving the race discrimination claim.

== Judgment ==
=== Tribunal ===
The Employment Tribunal found that Hounga was treated badly and dismissed because she was an immigrant, and therefore allowed a claim of racial discrimination. However, it rejected a claim in contract for unpaid wages, as the claim required the assertion of an illegal contract.

=== Employment Appeal Tribunal ===
Silber J in the EAT upheld the outcome of the decision by the Tribunal, while criticising the poor quality of its reasoning and making significant errors in paragraph numbering.

=== Court of Appeal ===
Rimer LJ held the discrimination claim was "inextricably linked" with the illegal conduct, because her immigration status meant that the claimant had a "special vulnerability". It would be condoning the illegality to allow the claimant to rely on her own illegal actions.

=== Supreme Court ===
Lord Wilson held that Ms Hounga's claim was not barred for illegality. Unlawful discrimination is a statutory tort, and the connection was insufficiently close, and did not have an "inextricable" link. According to him, "the application of the defence of illegality to claims in tort is highly problematic." The public policy against trafficking and in favour of the protection of its victims outweighed any public policy considerations in respect of not encouraging illegality.

Lord Kerr and Lady Hale concurred with Lord Wilson.

Lord Hughes dissented on the reasoning. He would have allowed the claim on the ground that the discriminatory act was not intrinsically connected to the illegality, but said this was distinct from any claim based on contract. He felt that the policy on illegal immigration and human trafficking was not so decisive as the majority had indicated.

Lord Carnworth concurred with Lord Hughes.

== See also ==
- UK labour law
