= Kathleen Tessaro =

American author

- Born: Pittsburgh, Pennsylvania, US
- Occupation: Novelist
- Spouse: James Rhodes (m. 2001–2009) Gregg Liberi (m. 2010)
- Children: 1
- Writing career
- Language: English
- Genre: Historical fiction
- Notable work: Elegance The Perfume Collector
- Website: kathleentessaro.com

Kathleen Tessaro is an American novelist. In 2023, Katie Holmes co-wrote, directed, and starred in a film adaptation of Tessaro's sixth book, Rare Objects.

== Personal life ==
She was born in Pittsburgh, Pennsylvania and attended the University of Pittsburgh and Carnegie Mellon University, where she was a member of their drama program.

Tessaro married pianist James Rhodes in 2001 and has a child with him. They were divorced by 2009. In 2014, Tessaro launched a lawsuit to prevent the publication of parts of Rhodes' biography; she believed it would be detrimental to their child's mental health to read of the sexual abuse Rhodes suffered as a child. Rhodes v OPO was appealed to the Supreme Court.

== Bibliography ==
- Elegance (2003, William Morrow)
- Innocence (2005, William Morrow)
- The Flirt (2007, William Morrow)
- The Debutante (2010, Harper)
- The Perfume Collector (2013, Harper)
- Rare Objects (2016, Harper)
