= Manchester Ship Canal Co Ltd v United Utilities Water Plc =

Manchester Ship Canal Co Ltd v United Utilities Water plc
- Court: UK Supreme Court
- Citation: [2014] UKSC 40

Keywords
- Water, sewage

Manchester Ship Canal Co Ltd v United Utilities Water plc [2014] UKSC 40 is a UK enterprise law case, concerning water in the UK.

== Facts ==
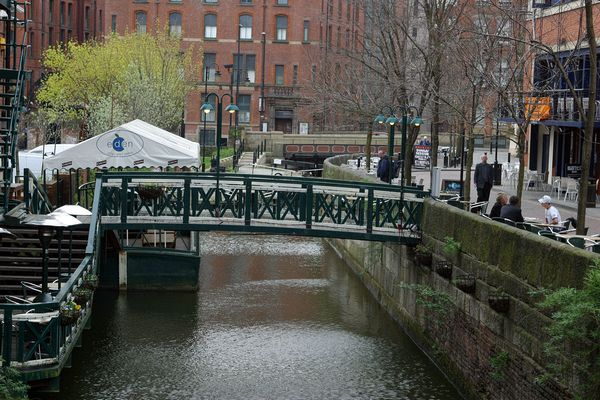
Canals in Manchester

Manchester Ship Canal Co Ltd claimed UUW plc should not be allowed to discharge surface water and treated effluent into its canals without consent under the Water Industry Act 1991 section 117(5).

== Judgment ==
The Supreme Court held that United Utilities Water plc was entitled to discharge water into the canals from the sewer outfall which was used from 1 December 1991 backwards.

Lord Sumption held that water going onto land was trespass unless authorised by statute. There is no express right in the Water Industry Act 1991. However, if necessary (not just convenient or reasonable), it could be implied to effectually achieve the statutory purpose, that could not otherwise be achieved. There was a case potentially analogous in Durrant v Branksome Urban District Council [1897] 2 Ch 291 but that has to be rejected. Also section 159 of the Water Industry Act 1991 contains a power to lay pipes, which would authorise a discharge. Earlier legislation is implied in the corresponding provision of the Water Industry Act 1991.

Lord Toulson concurred, but would have held if needed there was no trespass.

Lord Neuberger held there would be a right to compensation before 1991.

== See also ==
- United Kingdom enterprise law
