= R (HS2 Action Alliance Ltd) v Secretary of State for Transport =

2014 UK constitutional law case

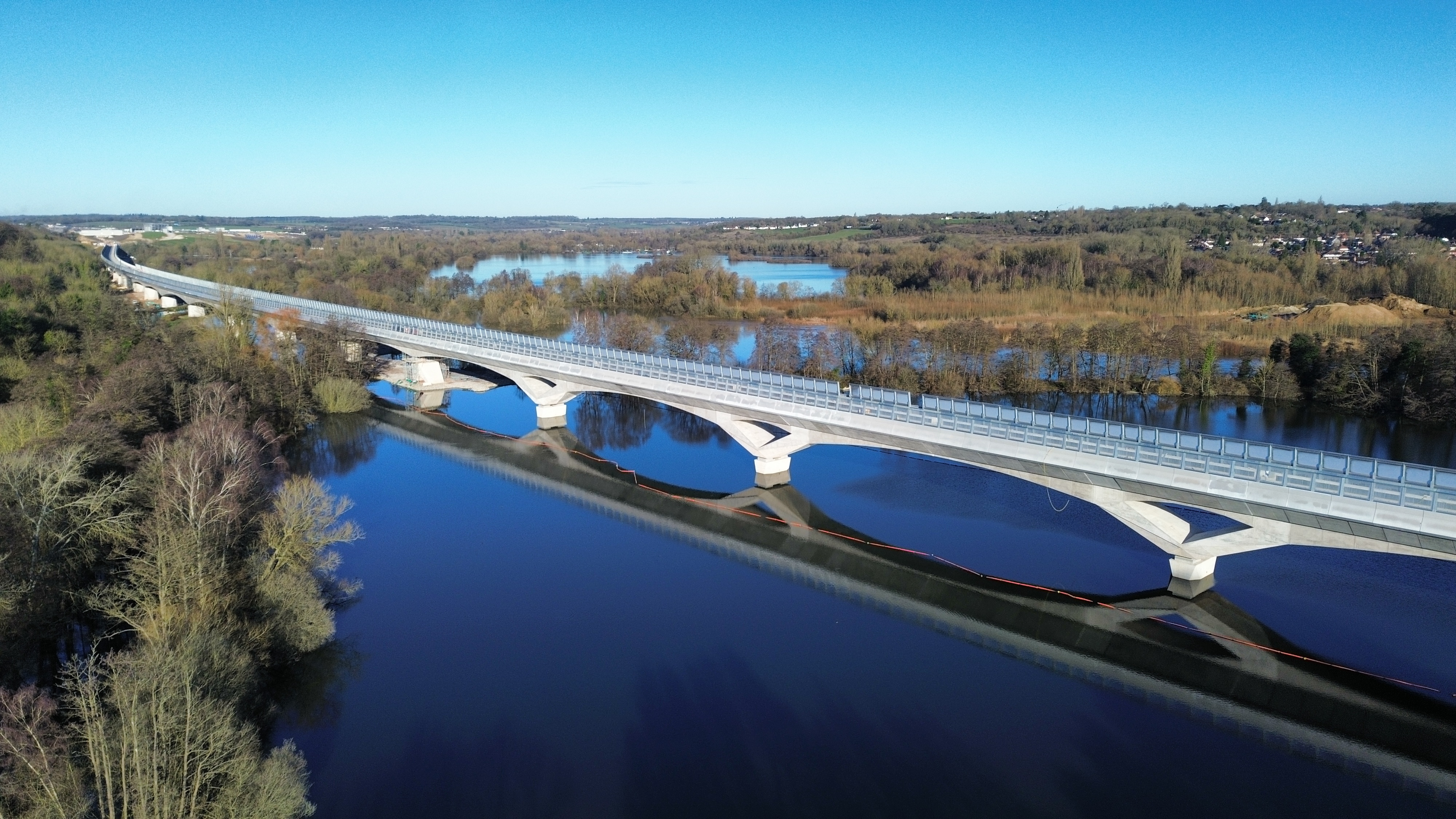
- Colne Valley Viaduct, High Speed 2
- Court: Supreme Court
- Citation: [2014] UKSC 3

Keywords
- Constitution, parliamentary sovereignty

R (HS2 Action Alliance Ltd) v Secretary of State for Transport [2014] UKSC 3 is a UK constitutional law case, concerning the conflict of law between a national legal system and European Union law.

== Facts ==
The HS2 Action Alliance, Buckinghamshire County Council, Hillingdon London Borough Council, and Heathrow Hub Ltd claimed that the Secretary of State should have done a strategic environmental assessment under Directive 2001/42 before the government's "Next Steps" Command Paper on HS2. This proposed a hybrid bill procedure in Parliament for constructing the High Speed 2 railway from London to Birmingham (phase 1), and then on to Manchester as well as Sheffield and Leeds (phase 2). The plaintiffs argued the Directive should be interpreted in line with the Convention on Access to Information, Public Participation in Decision-Making and Access to Justice in Environmental Matters 1998 (the Aarhus Convention 2001) art 7. They also argued that a hybrid bill procedure did not comply with the Environmental Impact Assessment Directive 2011/92/EU because the party whipped the vote, and limited opportunity to examine the information in Parliament. This was argued to fail the test for proper public participation under EIAD 2011 article 6(4).

== Judgment ==
The Supreme Court held that the UK has constitutional instruments that the courts would not interpret to be abrogated without close scrutiny. Lord Reed observed that the scrutiny of the legislative process required by the EU directive may amount to an impingement "upon long-established constitutional principles governing the relationship between Parliament and the courts" including the

207. "...Magna Carta, the Petition of Right 1628, the Bill of Rights and (in Scotland) the Claim of Rights Act 1689, the Act of Settlement 1701 and the Act of Union 1707. The European Communities Act 1972, the Human Rights Act 1998 and the Constitutional Reform Act 2005..."

Nor could the objections of insufficient judiciary scrutiny be resolved by applying the supremacy of European Union law forwarded by the Court of Justice of the European Union as the supremacy of European Union law depends on the European Communities Act 1972. That conflict between constitutional principles of the EU and UK be decided by courts under the constitutional law of the United Kingdom, rendered EU law’s position in the UK determinant not only by the European Communities Act 1972 but also by a number of other constitutional instruments that recognized fundamental principles “of which Parliament when it enacted the European Communities Act 1972 did not either contemplate or authorise the abrogation." This constrains the applicability of EU law instruments in the UK and blurs the distinction between "constitutional" and "ordinary" legislation, in that EU law only has supremacy "if not derogated in other primary legislation". The judgment also criticized the European Court of Justice’s previous case law on the SEA Directive and EIA Directive where the court interpreted the meaning of certain articles beyond what the European Parliament had prescribed. The judgment states:

171."Where the legislature has agreed a clearly expressed measure, reflecting the legislators’ choices and compromises in order to achieve agreement, it is not for courts to rewrite the legislation, or extend or 'improve' it in respects which the legislator clearly did not intend."

== See also ==
- Thoburn v Sunderland City Council
- UK enterprise law
- UK constitutional law
