= Rhodes v OPO =

- Court: Supreme Court of the United Kingdom
- Full case name: James Rhodes (Appellant) v OPO (by his litigation friend BHM) and another (Respondents)
- Argued: 19, 20 January 2015
- Decided: 20 May 2015
- Neutral citation: [2015] UKSC 32

Case history
- Prior history: [2014] EWCA Civ 1277

Holding
- Appeal allowed, restraining publication would be an inappropriate restriction on freedom of expression

Case opinions
- Majority: Lady Hale, Lords Toulson, Clarke, Wilson and Neuberger

Laws applied
- Wilkinson v Downton [1897] EWHC 1 (QB)

Area of law
- Freedom of speech

Rhodes v OPO [2015] UKSC 32 was a 2015 judgment by the Supreme Court of the United Kingdom that overturned an injunction preventing the publication of a memoir entitled Instrumental by concert pianist James Rhodes.

== Facts ==
James Rhodes' memoir is an account of the physical and sexual abuse he suffered as a young boy and his subsequent battles with drink, drugs and his own mental health. In February 2014 a draft of the book was leaked to Rhodes' ex-wife, Kathleen Tessaro, who, in June 2014, sought an injunction on behalf of their son that would delete a large number of passages or prohibit publication entirely. The son has been diagnosed with Asperger’s syndrome, attention deficit hyperactivity order, dyspraxia and dysgraphia and evidence was adduced that publication in the present form would cause severe emotional distress and psychological harm.

== Judgment ==
=== High Court ===
The application for an interim injunction was dismissed by Bean J in July 2014 on the basis that an action in tort under Wilkinson v Downton [1897] EWHC 1 (QB) did not extend beyond false or threatening words.

=== Court of Appeal ===
Arden, Jackson and McFarlane LLJ granted an interim injunction on the grounds that liability under Wilkinson v Downton can arise even if the statement is true. Jackson LJ held that the rule is that the statement must be "unjustified and that the defendant intends to cause or is reckless about causing physical or psychiatric injury to the claimant."

=== Supreme Court ===
The Supreme Court held that the tort under Wilkinson v Downton consists of three elements:

1. A conduct element
2. A mental element
3. A consequence element

The conduct element requires "words or conduct directed towards the claimant for which there is no justification or reasonable excuse, and the burden of proof is on the claimant." In the present case the court placed great emphasis on freedom of speech and held that "freedom to report the truth is a basic right to which the law gives a very high level of protection."

The mental element meanwhile requires an "intention to cause physical harm or severe mental or emotional distress". This overruled the Court of Appeal judgment that held recklessness to be sufficient. It was held that Rhodes did not intend to cause psychiatric harm or severe mental or emotional distress to his son.

The consequence element requires evidence of physical harm or recognised psychiatric illness but was not relevant in this case.

The court decided that the appeal should be allowed and Instrumental by James Rhodes was published by Canongate Books as an e-book on 25 May 2015 and a hardback edition was published on 28 May 2015.

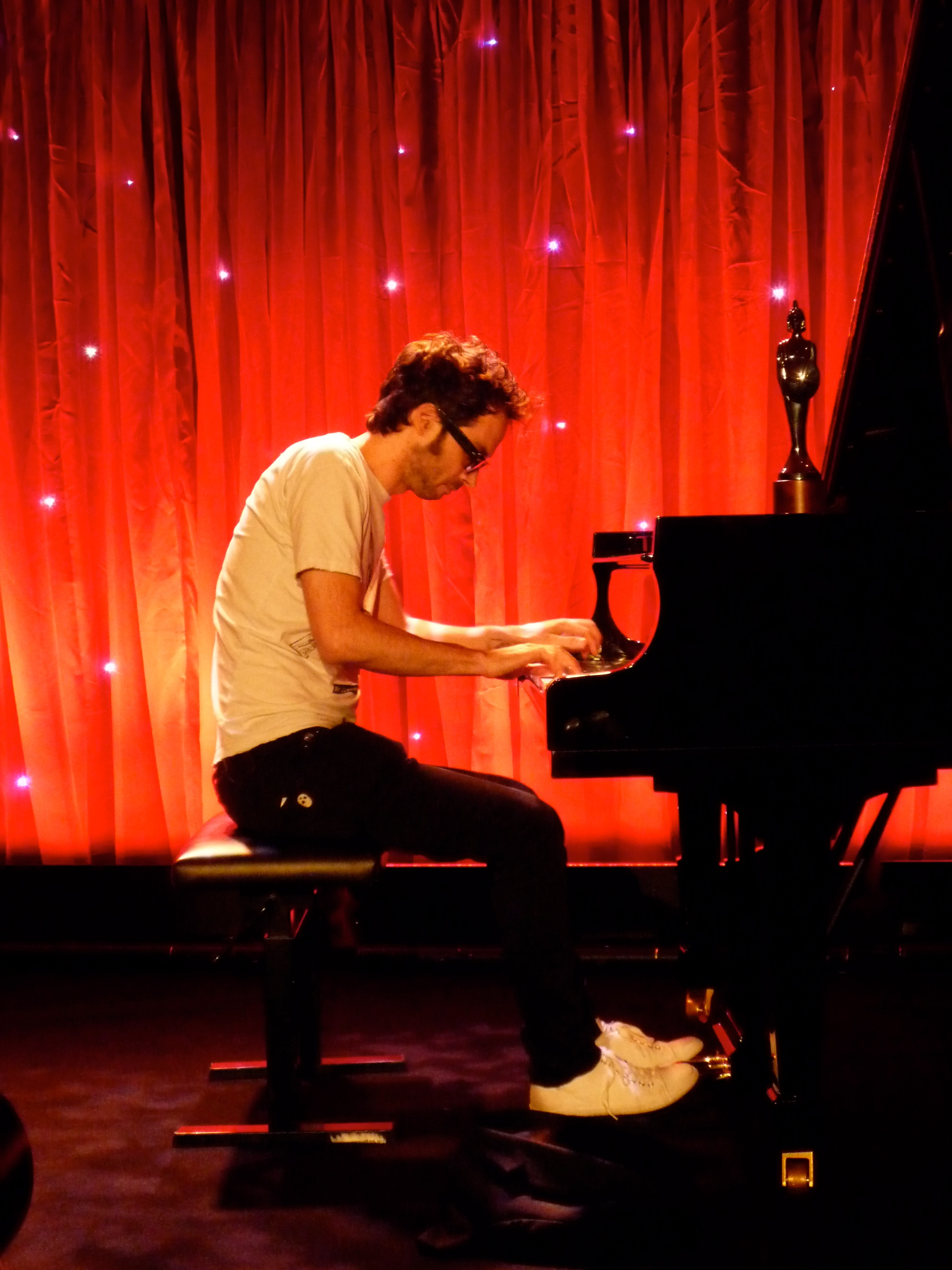
Classical pianist James Rhodes

== Reaction ==
Stephen Fry tweeted that the case represented "Victory at last for freedom of speech".
