= Sale and rent back =

Sale and Rent Back: Mortgage Lenders vs. Tenants
- Court: Supreme Court of the United Kingdom
- Started: November 2014
- Decided: November 2014

Holding
- The Court ruled that mortgage lenders' repossession rights take precedence over the sale and rent back tenants' rights

Laws applied
- Property Law, Financial Services Law

Sale and rent back is a form of property transaction involving the expeditious sale of an owner occupier's residence to a landlord or property company and renting it back from the new owner. This may be done by the occupier to release equity from the home without them having to move out, but there are risks and disadvantages for the occupier.

== In the United Kingdom ==
In the UK, the residence is sold and rented back to the previous owner usually, but not always, on an assured shorthold tenancy. The purchase price is generally below market value.

In November 2014, judges in a test case before the supreme court ruled unanimously that mortgage lenders were legally entitled to repossess homes in cases where the 'sale and rent back' companies had defaulted on mortgages used to buy the properties from their original owners. The promises of lifetime tenancies which had been offered by the sale and rent back companies were found to be worthless, and several hundred such tenants – many of them elderly or vulnerable – faced eviction following the ruling.

In ruling that the rights of the mortgage lenders took precedence over those of the tenants, one of the judges, Lord Collins, agreed that it was "a harsh result"; the judges noted that the former owners "may have been ... the victims of a fraud which tricked them out of their homes" – criminal charges are pending in some cases.

== Disadvantages ==
The downsides that in some circumstances the tenant is only provided with a limited tenure tenancy, in some cases for as little as 6 to 12 months after which the landlord may seek possession of the property with only two months notice. In addition, subsequent refinancing can see a new owner taking control, which adds to the uncertainty of tenure.

In recent years, the market for this option has swelled but the openness or longevity of the companies operating in it can be questionable. In addition to short tenancy, the future of rent charged can be unknown. Such companies advertise in the same media as sub-prime lenders, supplementing this with door-to-door leaflet drops.

This method is regulated by the Financial Conduct Authority under the Financial Services and Markets Act (Regulated Activities) Order 2001. In 2012, the Financial Services Authority said it had effectively shutdown the sector for sale and rent back schemes in the UK after investigating complaints.

== See also ==
- Equity release
- Elder financial abuse
- Leaseback
- Rent-to-own
- Reverse mortgage
