= Telefonica O2 UK Ltd v British Telecommunications plc =

UK enterprise Law

Telefonica O2 UK Ltd v BT plc
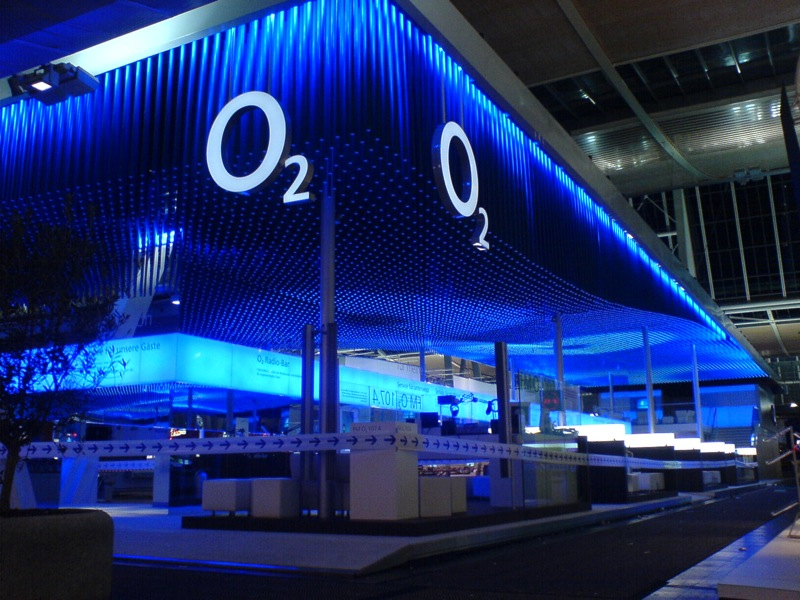
- Court: UK Supreme Court
- Citation: [2014] UKSC 42

Keywords
- Telecommunications

Telefonica O2 UK Ltd v British Telecommunications plc [2014] UKSC 42 is a UK enterprise law, concerning telecommunications.

== Facts ==
Telefonica O2 UK Ltd argued that BT’s charges for connections and terminations were unlawful. BT’s Standard Interconnect Agreement was varied unilaterally in 2009 to change termination charges for 08 numbers, subject to a mobile operator’s right to object, and dispute resolution by Ofcom (unless both parties wanted something else). Under the new scheme, operators would be given charges varying by the amount the originating network charged to callers. If callers paid more, termination charges would go up. After Telefonica’s objection, Ofcom decided the changes would be allowed if ‘fair and reasonable’ as judged by three principles of (1) mobile network operators should recover costs of originating calls to relevant numbers (2) new charges should provide benefits to consumers, and not entail distortion of competition, and (3) new charges should be implemented as soon as practicable. Ofcom decided it was not shown that the new charges produced consumer benefits, and promote welfare, and so BT should not be allowed to introduce the new scheme.

The Competition Appeal Tribunal allowed BT to introduce the new scheme. The Court of Appeal stopped BT introducing the new scheme. BT appealed.

== Judgment ==
Lord Sumption held that BT could introduce the new scheme. Ofcom rejected the scheme solely because of the welfare test, and it had not been shown BT's new charges would produce consumer benefits. BT was entitled by contract to vary charges, unless inconsistent with Directive 2002/21 art 8, which included a need to ensure consumer benefits. There was no finding of a lack of consumer benefit, so Ofcom could not reject charges just because they might have adverse consumer consequences, without any reason to think they would. They applied an extreme precautionary principle to a dynamic and competitive market, at odds with the Directives’ market-oriented and permissive approach.

19. Ofcom issued a final determination dated 5 February 2010 in relation to 080 numbers, and a second final determination dated 10 August 2010 in relation to 0845 and 0870 numbers. For present purposes, it is possible to concentrate on the determination relating to 0845 and 0870 numbers, because it is common ground that that determination may be taken to represent Ofcom's position in relation to all three number ranges.

20. Ofcom decided that it would permit the changes to be made only if they were "fair and reasonable", judged by three governing principles. Principle 1 was that mobile network operators should be able to recover their efficient costs of originating calls to the relevant numbers. Principle 2 was that the new charges should (i) provide benefits to consumers, and (ii) not entail a material distortion of competition. Principle 3 was that implementation of the new charges should be reasonably practicable. All three principles can be related to objectives set out in Article 8.2 of the Framework Directive. No one has challenged this as an appropriate analytical framework. Ofcom found that Principle 1 was satisfied. It found that Principle 3 was not satisfied, but it was overruled on that point by the Competition Appeal Tribunal, and there has been no appeal against its decision on that point. Accordingly the outcome of this appeal turns on the application of Principle 2. Ofcom found that Principle 2 was "not sufficiently likely to be met".

21. As regards Principle 2(i), which is known as the "welfare test", Ofcom distinguished between three potential effects on consumers: the "direct effect", essentially the effect on consumer prices for calls to 08 numbers; the "indirect effect", which referred to the possibility that revenue gains by BT would feed back to the consumer in the form of lower charges or higher standards of service by service providers who use 08 numbers; and the "mobile tariff package effect" (or "waterbed effect"), by which it meant the potential for mobile network operators deprived of one revenue stream to try to compensate themselves by seeking to raise prices elsewhere. It thought that the direct effect was likely to be positive for consumers, because a tariff based on the originating network's charge to the caller was likely to lead mobile network operators to reduce their charges to callers, although it could not say by how much. It thought that the indirect effect was also likely to be positive, because over time some of the benefits to BT would be passed on to service providers using the 08 numbers in question, although callers to 08 numbers would not necessarily benefit. Ofcom's concern was about the mobile tariff package effect. It thought that this was likely to be negative because mobile network operators would probably try to recoup the higher termination charges by raising charges for other services. Taking the three effects together, Ofcom's conclusion was as follows:

"9.30 As set out above, there is uncertainty about the sizes of each of the Direct, Indirect and Mobile tariff package effects. However, as shown in Table 9.1, the overall effect on consumers depends on the relative sizes of these offsetting effects (even though we place more weight on the Direct effect than the Mobile tariff package effect, because of our policy preference for 0845/0870 prices to be aligned with geographic call prices).

9.31 Our judgement in respect of Principle 2 is therefore finely balanced. We recognise the possibility that consumers could benefit from NCCNs 985 and 986. However, we also recognise the risk of harm to consumers from NCCNs 985 and 986, particularly in light of our conclusions on the Mobile tariff package effect.

9.32 Given the uncertainty which we have identified as to whether BT's NCCNs would result in a net benefit or net harm to consumers, and in light of our overriding statutory duties to further the interests of consumers, we consider it is appropriate for us to place greater weight on this potential risk to consumers from NCCNs 985 and 986."

22. Turning to the competition test at Principle 2(ii), Ofcom concluded that while there were some concerns on this count, the risk of a material distortion of competition arising from the changes was "relatively low".

23. Taking the welfare test and the competition test together, Ofcom concluded that Principle 2 was not satisfied, because BT could not positively demonstrate that the proposed tariff changes would be beneficial to consumers. In summary, what Ofcom decided was that although the direct and the indirect effect of BT's proposed price changes could be expected to result in lower prices for consumers, BT should not be allowed to make the changes because it was not possible to forecast how far mobile network operators would be able to compensate themselves by increasing other charges.

[...]

The welfare test

42. Leaving aside Principle 3, which it is now common ground was satisfied, the sole basis on which Ofcom rejected the new charges was that the welfare test having been inconclusive, it had not been demonstrated that BT's new schedule of charges would produce consumer benefits. In my opinion, this was wrong in principle, for substantially the reasons given by the CAT. BT were contractually entitled to vary their charges unless the proposed variations were inconsistent with the Article 8 objectives, including the objective of ensuring consumer benefit in accordance with Article 8.2(a). Ofcom have not found that they were inconsistent with those objectives. They have found that they would produce direct and indirect consumer benefits of unquantifiable value, and that these benefits might or might not be exceeded by disbenefits arising from the attempts of mobile network operators to increase revenue in other directions. The latter factor was found by the CAT to be "essentially unknown".

43. In my opinion, it is not consistent with either the contract or the scheme of the Directives for Ofcom to reject charges simply because they might have adverse consequences for consumers, in the absence of any reason to think that they would. It is not consistent with the contract because it prevents BT from exercising its discretion to alter its charges in circumstances where there is no reason to suppose, and Ofcom has not found, that the limits of that discretion have been exceeded. It is inconsistent with the scheme of the Directives because it involves applying an extreme form of the precautionary principle to a dynamic and competitive market, in a manner which is at odds with the Directives' market-oriented and essentially permissive approach. Logically, given the inherent difficulty of forecasting the extent of any direct or indirect effects, and the practical impossibility of forecasting the mobile tariff package effect, it would rule out any increases in termination charges other than those justified by reference to underlying costs. On this point, therefore, I think that the CAT were right and that the Court of Appeal were wrong to overturn them.

44. In its submissions on the appeal, Ofcom submitted that the degree of risk which is acceptable must be related to the gravity of the adverse effect if the risk materialises. It expressed concern that it should not, for example, be inhibited from blocking a price variation which on a balance of probabilities was unlikely to be adverse, but which if things went wrong would be catastrophic. I agree. This would be an example of a case where the existence of the risk was itself adverse to the interests protected by Article 8. But on the facts found by Ofcom and the CAT, we are a long way from that kind of situation in the present case. It is right to add that if and when sufficiently adverse effects were to materialise at some point in the future, Ofcom has power to intervene to address them at that stage.

Anti-competitive effect of price control

45. The Court of Appeal's second reason for thinking that it was for BT to demonstrate positively that there would be consumer benefits from the proposed changes to their charging structure was that they disagreed with the CAT's emphasis on the anti-competitive effect of preventing the introduction of innovative charging structures. The Court of Appeal did not suggest that it was economically mistaken. But they considered that too much weight had been attached to it by the CAT. In their view, this was a matter of regulatory policy. Since Ofcom was the regulator and it was exercising a regulatory function in resolving the present dispute, the CAT should not have interfered with their conclusion unless Ofcom erred in principle. The Court of Appeal thought that since the CAT substantially agreed with Ofcom's conclusion on the welfare test, there was no error of principle.

46. I think that in this respect also, the Court of Appeal was wrong. In the first place, as I have explained, in resolving this particular dispute, Ofcom was not exercising a regulatory function, but resolving a dispute under the unchallenged terms of an existing agreement. But the main problem about the Court of Appeal's view is a more fundamental one. According to the CAT's analysis, the effect of not allowing BT to introduce innovative charging structures was itself anticompetitive because innovative pricing structures are an effective mode of competing. This was clearly a relevant consideration, even if it was not a conclusive one: see Article 8.2(b) of the Framework Directive. It was not a consideration taken into account by Ofcom. Since the right to introduce the proposed pricing package brought benefits for competition, the mobile network operators should have to justify their demand that the package should be rejected by pointing to some countervailing detriments to consumers disclosed by the welfare test if it were to be accepted. An inconclusive welfare test could not be enough for this purpose. The CAT was hearing an appeal by way of rehearing on the merits. Their conclusion about the anti-competitive effects of restricting price changes and the weight to be attached to it was a factual judgment which it was perfectly entitled to make. It was, moreover, an economic judgment by an expert tribunal which had received a substantial amount of additional evidence, including economic evidence. Since appeal lay to the Court of Appeal only on points of law, the CAT's findings on the distortion of competition liable to result from the rejection of the new charging structure were not open to rejection on appeal.

Inappropriateness of restricting prices in the absence of significant market power

47. These considerations are enough to resolve the present dispute in favour of BT. It is therefore unnecessary to consider the CAT's third reason for requiring the mobile network operators to show a distinct disbenefit to consumers in order to justify rejecting a proposed change to interconnection charges. This was that the rejection of BT's proposed charges amounted to imposing price control on an entity such as BT which had not been designated as having significant market power in a relevant market. This, it was argued, was wrong in principle because there was no power under the Directives and the Act to regulate the prices of a firm without such power. BT put this point at the forefront of their submissions. For reasons which were never entirely clear but may have to do with their commercial and regulatory strategies, they were anxious to avoid relying on BT's rights under the Interconnection Agreements or adopting those parts of the CAT's reasoning which were based on them, and instead sought to obtain a ruling that the Common Regulatory Framework can never authorise Ofcom to reject a price variation unless it would leave an efficient operator unable to cover its costs.

48. I will only say that as at present advised I am not convinced by this. It seems to me to be irrelevant to the question on which this appeal turns, namely whether BT must positively demonstrate consumer benefit if they are to justify their proposed charges. Moreover, the fact that BT does not have significant market power in a relevant market does not mean that the promotion of competition, which is included among the Article 8 objectives, is irrelevant to a dispute about charges. It only means that Ofcom may not exercise its regulatory power to control prices. Ofcom has not purported to do this. There is an important difference between (i) exercising a regulatory power to impose price control in order to correct market failure or control the abuse of a dominant economic position, and (ii) deciding whether a particular proposed tariff change advances consumer welfare for the purpose of determining whether there is a right to introduce it.

A hypothetical alternative analysis

49. It will be apparent that I do not accept the basic conceptual framework within which the Court of Appeal reviewed these questions. It is, however right, in view of the way that the argument went and in the light of suggestions that there should be a reference to the Court of Justice of the European Union, to point out that the result would have been the same even if Lloyd LJ had been right to regard Ofcom's dispute resolution functions as purely regulatory and the interconnection terms as being unimportant. The whole scheme of the Directives is to leave the arrangements for interconnection to the parties unless there are grounds for regulatory intervention. The permissible grounds of regulatory intervention in the case of a CP without significant market power are that the interconnection terms have been framed or are being operated in a manner which is inconsistent with end-to-end connectivity or conflicts with the Article 8 objectives. If the result of the welfare test and the competition test is that there is no positive reason to believe that the effects will be adverse, there is no justification for regulatory intervention.

Reference to the Court of Justice of the European Union

50. If this appeal turned on the point about the absence of significant market power which BT put at the forefront of their submissions (see paragraphs 47-8 above), it would in my view have been appropriate to refer that point to the CJEU before determining it. As it is, I would decide the appeal on less controversial grounds, and I do not consider that a reference is appropriate. The recognition that the interconnection terms are the starting point does not itself warrant a reference, since the centrality of the interconnection terms in the scheme of the Directives is obvious and no convincing reason has been put forward by any of the parties or interveners for ignoring them. In any event, for the reasons that I have given, the outcome would be the same even on a purely regulatory analysis. Leaving aside Mr Beard's argument about the absence of significant market power, there is no dispute about the Article 8 criteria themselves. Ultimately, the problem which the Respondents have faced on this appeal is that the CAT's economic analysis of the facts was that there was no reason to anticipate a net adverse effect engaging that Article.

Conclusion

51. In my opinion there was no justification for the Court of Appeal to set aside the careful analysis of the CAT on a matter lying very much within its expertise. I would accordingly allow this appeal. Counsel will be invited to make written submissions on the form of order unless this can be agreed.

Lord Neuberger, Lord Mance, Lord Toulson and Lord Hodge agreed.

== See also ==
- United Kingdom enterprise law
- EU law
