= Roger Toulson, Lord Toulson =

British lawyer and judge (1946–2017)

The Right Honourable Lord Toulson
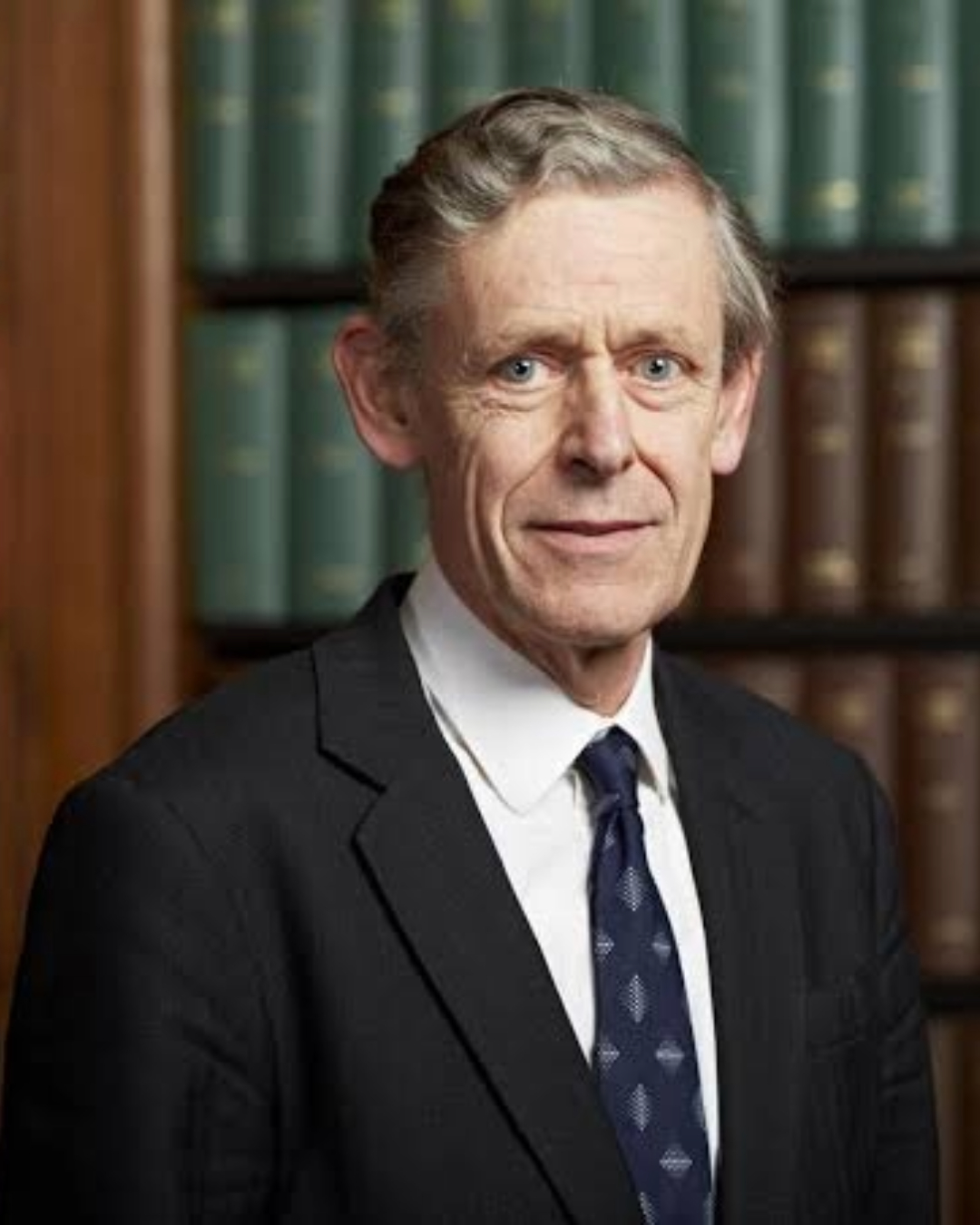
- Toulson in 2016

Justice of the Supreme Court of the United Kingdom
- In office 9 April 2013 – 22 September 2016
- Nominated by: Chris Grayling
- Appointed by: Elizabeth II
- Preceded by: The Lord Walker of Gestingthorpe
- Succeeded by: Lady Black of Derwent

Lord Justice of Appeal
- In office 29 January 2007 – 9 April 2013

Personal details
- Born: Roger Grenfell Toulson; 23 September 1946
- Died: 27 June 2017 (aged 70)
- Education: Jesus College, Cambridge
- Occupation: Judge

Roger Grenfell Toulson, Lord Toulson, PC (23 September 1946 – 27 June 2017) was a British lawyer and judge who served as a Justice of the Supreme Court of the United Kingdom.

== Education ==
He was educated at Mill Hill School, to which he won the top scholarship for his year and was one of the most talented pupils, taking 'O' levels at 13, 'A' levels in Greek, Latin and Ancient History at 15, and breaking the school record for the mile at 16, at which age he left to go to Jesus College, Cambridge (MA, LLB), of which he later became an honorary fellow, before being called to the Bar by the Inner Temple in 1969.

== Career ==
He joined the Western Circuit in 1970, and became a Queen's Counsel in 1986. In 1996 he became a judge of the High Court of Justice, sitting in the Queen's Bench Division, receiving the customary knighthood. From 2002 to 2006 he sat as Chairman of the Law Commission of England and Wales. On 29 January 2007, he was promoted to the Court of Appeal, sworn of the Privy Council and appointed to the Judicial Appointments Commission.

Toulson was appointed as a Justice of the Supreme Court of the United Kingdom on 9 April 2013. By Royal Warrant, all members of the Supreme Court, even if they do not hold a peerage, are entitled to the judicial style and title "Lord" for life. Toulson was granted the judicial courtesy title Lord Toulson. He retired from the court on 22 September 2016.

As a judge Toulson was opposed to judicial interference in Government action. He expressed the view that "all human life is experimental, all forms of government are experimental. I think it would be a retrograde step if the courts, in the name of rights, prevent governments of whichever hue from engaging in legitimate social experimentation."

Toulson was the co-author of a textbook on the English law of confidentiality.

He died on 27 June 2017 at the age of 70, while in hospital for heart surgery.

== Notable judicial decisions ==
Lord Toulson was involved in a number of notable decisions during his time as a judge. He referred to his judgment in R v Jogee [2016] UKSC 8 as the most memorable.

Other notable judicial decisions of Lord Toulson included:

- Michael and others v The Chief Constable of South Wales Police and another [2015] UKSC 2
- Jetivia SA v Bilta (UK) Limited (in liquidation) [2015] UKSC 23
- Patel v Mirza [2016] UKSC 42
- Rhodes v OPO [2015] UKSC 32
- Bunge SA v Nidera BV [2015] UKSC 43
- Cavendish Square Holding BV v Talal El Makdessi [2015] UKSC 67
- R (British Sky Broadcasting Ltd) v Central Criminal Court [2014] UKSC 17
- R (Reilly) v Secretary of State for Work and Pensions [2013] UKSC 68

In Kennedy v Charity Commission [2014], Lord Toulson said famously: “it was not the purpose of the Human Rights Act that the common law should become an ossuary”.

Lord Toulson also gave the sole dissenting judgment in PJS v News Group Newspapers [2016] UKSC 26, a dissent of particular note, given his special interest in the law of confidentiality. He expressed the view that certain information about the private life of a celebrity had become so widely available that it could no longer be sensibly protected by injunctive relief, observing, "The court must live in the world as it is and not as it would like it to be."
