= Kondis v State Transport Authority =

Australian High Court case

- Court: High Court of Australia
- Full case name: Anastasios Kondis v. State Transport Authority (formerly Victorian Railways Board)
- Decided: 16 October 1984
- Citation: 502

Case history
- Prior actions: Walter Wright P/L v Kondis, Anastasios & Victorian Railways Board [1983]
- Appealed from: Supreme Court of Victoria
- Subsequent actions: Walter Wright P/L v Kondis, Anastasios & Victorian Railways Board [1985]

Court membership
- Judges sitting: Mason, Murphy, Brennan, Deane & Dawson (Justices)

Case opinions
- The duty of an employer to provide a safe system of work is not able to be delegated.
- Decision by: Mason
- Concurrence: All present

Keywords
- Duty of care, vicarious liability

Kondis v State Transport Authority was an Australian court case decided in the High Court of Australia on 16 October 1984. It concerned the liability of an employer (the State Transport Authority) for the injury of an employee (Anastasios Kondis), and specifically whether the duty of care to provide a safe system of work could be delegated. It had been challenged on the basis that the person whose negligence had directly caused the injury was not actually an employee, but an independent contractor, and the duty of care to provide a safe system of work had been delegated to them at the time of the injury. However, it was found that the duty of care could not be delegated in certain cases, and the employer was found liable.

== Background ==
Anastasios Kondis was born in Greece in 1933. In 1968, he migrated to Australia, and began working for the State Transport Authority of Victoria. On 14 March 1975, Kondis was working at the Jolimont Railway Yards for the State Transport Authority, and was working with a group of other workers in dismantling an A-frame. A crane and operator had been hired by the State Transport Authority to assist with dismantling the frame. The crane operator, Clissold, decided to extend the crane's jib out. In the process of doing so, he caused a bar to fall from the jib. Kondis was below the jib at the time, and had bent over to pick up an object. He was not given any warning that the bar had fallen, and was struck and injured by it. Due to substantially conflicting reports from all involved, the exact circumstances of the injury could not be determined further.

== Case ==
Kondis sought damages for his injury, initially in the County Court. There it was initially found that the State Transport Authority was vicariously liable, and that Clissold was effectively a "temporary employee" of the State Transport Authority. The Authority appealed the decision to the Supreme Court and it was heard by the full court of that court. The prior decision was overturned. Kondis then appealed against this, and the case came before the High Court.

The main issue was whether the employer (the State Transport Authority) could be held liable for the injury even though it had been caused by the admitted negligence of the crane operator. This liability could fall upon the State Transport Authority in two ways. Firstly, it could be held vicariously liable, in the same manner as if the contractor had been an employee. Secondly, they could be held liable for failing to provide a safe system of work.

== Judgement ==
Justice Mason delivered the judgement, with all judges concurring, and Chief Justice Gibbs and Justice Wilson absent. There were three main points made in the judgement.

Firstly, it was upheld that an employer was not vicariously liable for injury or death caused to their employees by the unforeseeable negligence of an independent contractor.

Secondly, it was found that an employer was however liable for injury or death caused by the negligence of an independent contractor, if the employer had failed to provide a safe system of work, and where this failure had allowed the injury or death to occur.

Lastly, it was found that the duty of care was not able to be delegated in some cases.

In handing down his decision, Justice Mason stated the following in relation to the matter of non-delegable duty of care, and liability for the actions of independent contractors

In the case of the employer there is no unfairness in imposing on him a non-delegable duty; it is reasonable that he should bear liability for the negligence of his independent contractors in devising a safe system of work. If he requires his employee to work according to an unsafe system he should bear the consequences.

— Justice Mason

In relation to the aspect of vicarious liability, Mason stated:

The respondent is liable for his neglect, not on a vicarious basis, but because Clissold's omission to adopt a safe system is a breach of the respondent's duty. ... His omissions ... do not inhibit the conclusion that there was a breach of the respondent's duty to provide a safe system of work.

— Justice Mason

In his concurring opinion, Justice Murphy stated the following in relation to the safety of the system of work at the time of the injury:

... a reasonably safe system of work would at least require a warning to be given when the push-rod was about to be dropped. The Authority's failure to take care to see that a reasonably safe system was instituted and carried out in this respect renders it liable in negligence. There were other precautions which should have been taken and other warnings which should have been given. There was nothing resembling a safe system.

— Justice Murphy

In addition, Kondis v State Transport Authority identified some of the principal categories of case where it had been established that the duty of care could not be delegated to another:

- Adjoining owners of land in relation to work threatening support or common walls. (Dalton v Angus (1881))
- Employer and employee in relation to a safe system of work. (Wilsons & Clyde Coal Co. v English)
- Hospital and patient.(Gold v Essex County Council (1942) and Cassidy v. Ministry of Health)
- School and pupil. (Commonwealth v Introvigne)
- Invitor and invitee, in relation to safety of premises. (Thomson v Cremin (1956))

It set several important precedents surrounding duty of care, vicarious liability, and the duty of employers to provide a safe system of work. It has been cited in over five hundred cases since it was handed down.

The High Court ordered that the case return to the Supreme Court of Victoria to determine the amount of damages to be paid.

== See also ==
- Australian tort law
