= Premises liability =

Type of liability in tort law

Premises liability (known in some common law jurisdictions as occupiers' liability) is the liability that a landowner or occupier has for certain torts that occur on their land.

== Scope of the law ==
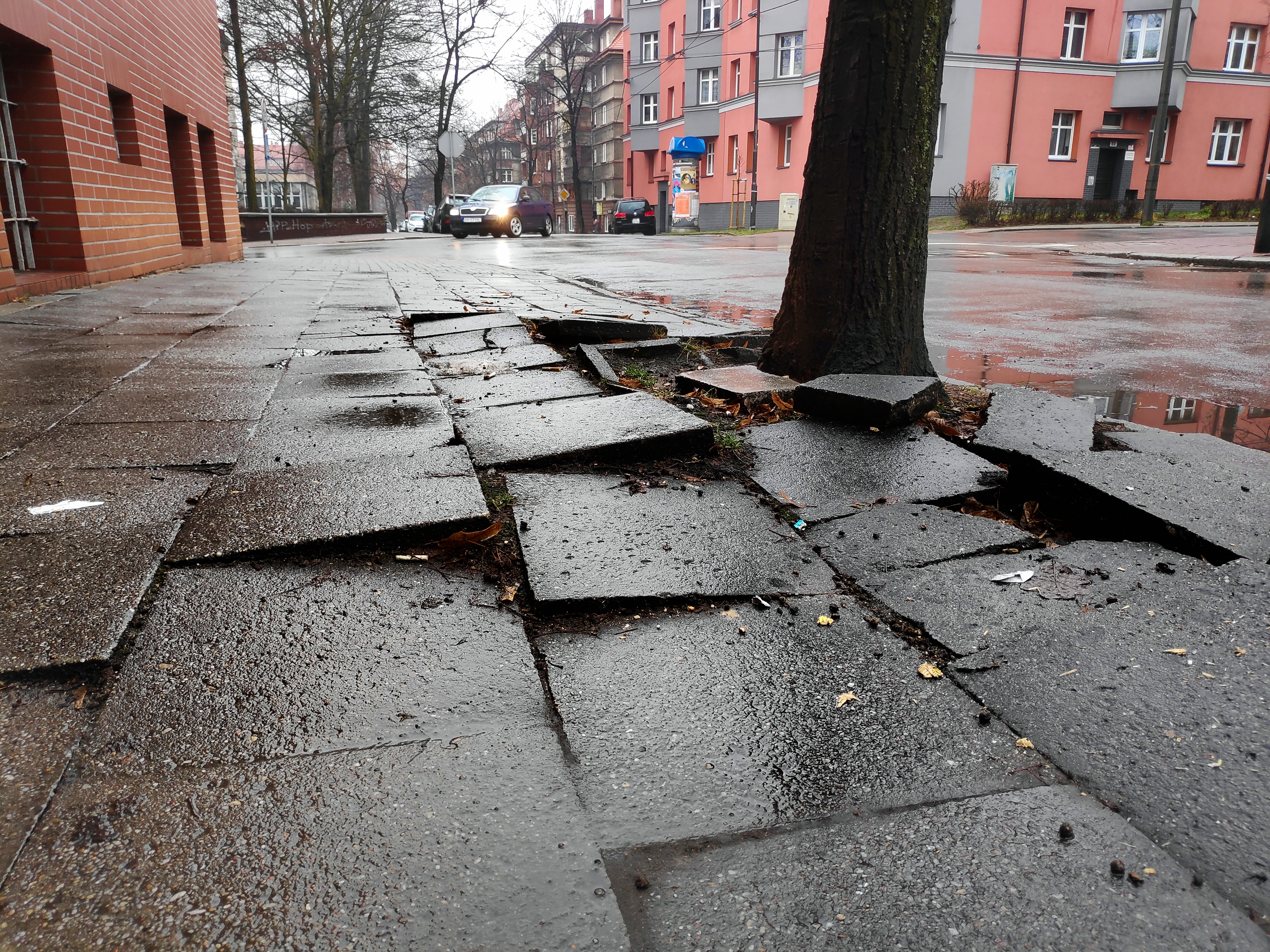
Example of uneven sidewalk tiles that might cause a fall

Premises liability may range from things from "injuries caused by a variety of hazardous conditions, including open excavations, uneven pavement, standing water, crumbling curbs, wet floors, uncleared snow, icy walks, falling objects, inadequate security, insufficient lighting, concealed holes, improperly secured mats, or defects in chairs or benches".

For premises liability to apply:

1. The defendant must possess the land or "premises".
2. The plaintiff must be an invitee or, in certain cases, a licensee. Traditionally, trespassers were not protected under premises liability law. However, in 1968, the California Supreme Court issued a vastly influential opinion, Rowland v. Christian, 69 Cal.2d 108 (1968), which abolished the significance of legal distinctions such as invitee, licensee, or trespasser in determining whether one could hold the possessor of a premises liable for harm. This opinion led to changes in the law in many other states in the United States, and is viewed as a seminal opinion in the development of the law of premises liability.
3. There must be negligence—a breach of the duty of care—or some other wrongful act. In recent years, the law of premises liability has evolved to include cases where a person is injured on the premises of another by a third person's wrongful act, such as an assault. These cases are sometimes referred to as "third party premises liability" cases and they represent a highly complex and dynamic area of tort law. They pose especially complex legal issues of duty and causation because the injured party is seeking to hold a possessor or owner of property directly or vicariously liable when the immediate injury-producing act was, arguably, not caused by the possessor or owner.

== Common law of premises liability ==
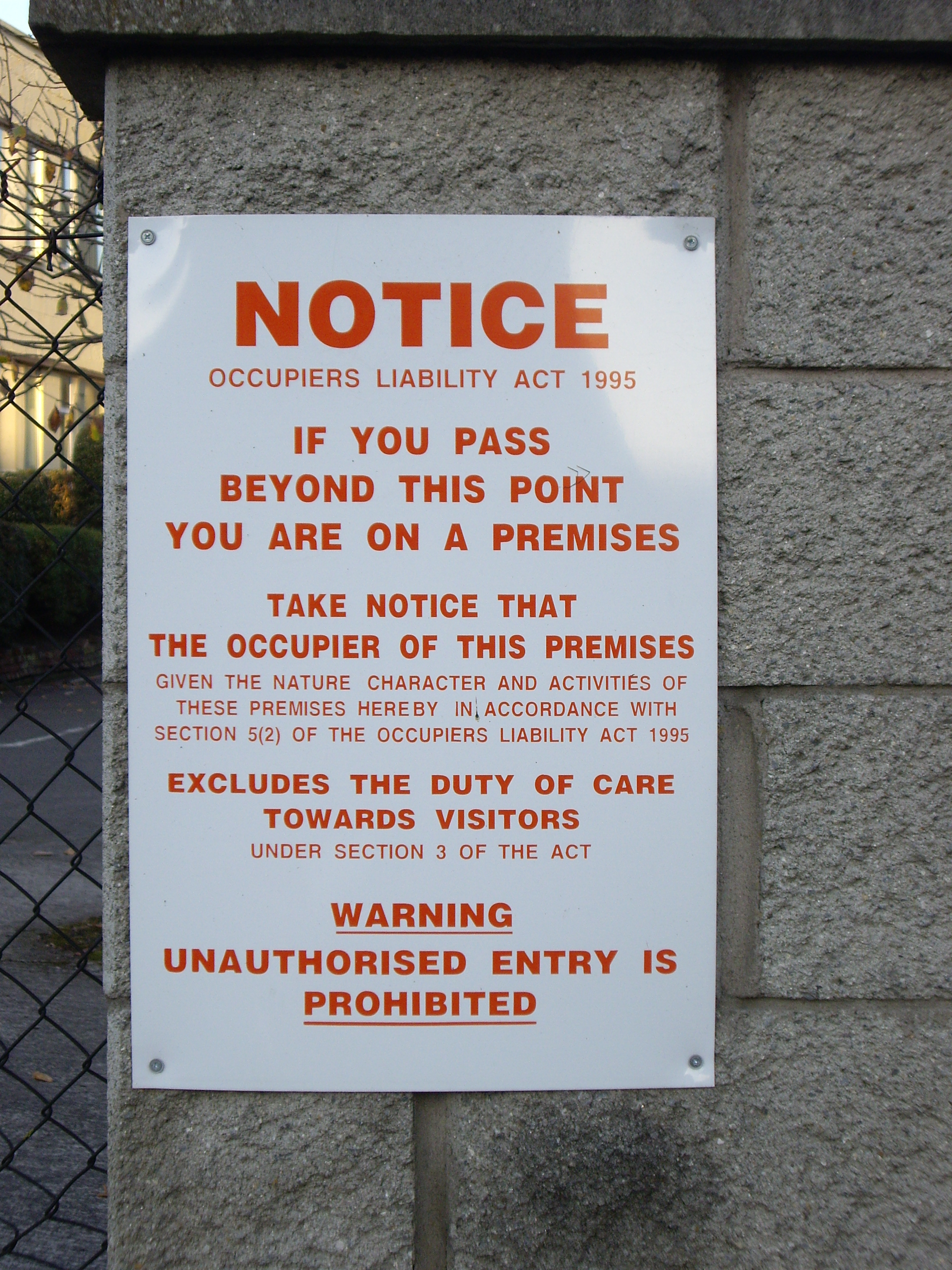
A notice informing potential entrants of limits to the duty of care

At common law, in the case of landowners, the extent of their duty of care to those who came on their premises varied depending on whether a person was classified as a trespasser, licensee, or invitee. This rule was eventually abolished in some common law jurisdictions. For example, England enacted the Occupiers Liability Act 1957. Similarly, in the 1968 landmark case of Rowland v. Christian, the Supreme Court of California replaced the old classifications with a general duty of care to all persons on one's land, regardless of their status. After several highly publicized and controversial cases, the California Legislature enacted a statute in 1985 that partially restored immunity to landowners from some types of lawsuits from trespassers.

Colorado's highest court adopted the Rowland unified duty of care analysis in 1971. The resulting explosion of lawsuits against Colorado landowners caused the state legislature to enact the Colorado Premises Liability Act in 1986, which enacted a cleaned-up statutory version of the common law classifications and simultaneously expressly displaced all common law remedies against landowners in order to prevent state courts from again expanding their liability.

In the Republic of Ireland, under the Occupiers' Liability Act, 1995, the duty of care to trespassers, visitors and "recreational users" can be restricted by the occupier; provided reasonable notice is given, for which a prominent notice at the usual entrance to the premises usually suffices.

== Premises liability case law of the United States ==
In United States law, premises liability law is highly developed and can differ from state to state. The majority of states have abandoned or modified the traditional premises liability trichotomy for a reasonable-person standard in light of Rowland v. Christian. This section includes some examples of state case law.

=== Florida ===
In Lai Chau v. Southstar Equity Limited Co. and Brookside Properties Inc., a former University of South Florida student, survived a violent abduction in her North Tampa apartment complex in 2001. Two men sneaked past the complex's security gate, and shot the 20-year-old student three times in the head. The landmark negligent security case won Chau $15.7 million in damages in 2004.

=== New York ===
In Morales v. Lia, a pedestrian who was hit by a car in the parking lot of a strip mall was unable to get payment for his injuries from the mall owner because the driver and owner of the vehicle were determined to be 100% liable for plaintiff's injuries.

In Peralta v. Henriquez, New York's highest court, the New York Court of Appeals, held that a landowner has a duty to provide lighting, when "defendants created the dangerous condition that led to the accident, [and] notice was not at issue ...."; in this case, it was lack of illumination that caused plaintiff's injuries when she walked into a bent car antenna in the darkened parking lot of defendant's premises. Both the intermediate court, the Appellate Division, and the N.Y. Court of Appeals cited prior precedent, that when "the general public is invited into stores, office buildings and other places of public assembly, the owner is charged with the duty of providing the public with a reasonably safe premises, including a safe means of ingress and egress." Peralta has been cited itself as precedent in at least one other department's decision. Peralta was distinguished in those instances where the landlord had no notice of a dangerous situation, e.g. a tenant's prior criminal propensity to commit arson.

== See also ==
- Slip and fall
