= Rowland v. Christian =

- Supreme Court of California

Decided August 8, 1968
- Full case name: James David Rowland, Jr., Plaintiff and Appellant, v. Nancy Christian, Defendant and Respondent.
- Citation(s): 69 Cal. 2d 108

Case history
- Prior history: Appeal by plaintiff from summary judgment for defendant, San Francisco County Superior Court, affirmed on Oct. 27, 1967, 63 Cal.Rptr. 98, First District Court of Appeal, hearing granted, Dec. 19, 1967 (now-obsolete terminology for grant of discretionary review).

Holding
- An occupant of a property owes a general duty of care to any visitor, even if the visitor is trespassing. Trial court reversed.

Court membership
- Chief Justice: Roger J. Traynor
- Associate Justices: Marshall F. McComb, Raymond E. Peters, Mathew Tobriner, Stanley Mosk, Louis H. Burke, Raymond L. Sullivan

Case opinions
- Majority: Peters, joined by Traynor, Tobriner, Mosk, Sullivan
- Dissent: Burke, joined by McComb

Rowland v. Christian, 69 Cal. 2d 108 (1968), was a landmark case decided by the Supreme Court of California. It eliminated the categories of invitee, licensee, and trespasser to determine the duty of care owed by a possessor of land to the people on the land. It replaced the classifications with a general duty of care owed to all persons.

== Background ==
As explained by the Court of Appeal in its opinion below, the plaintiff, James Davis Rowland, Jr., was a guest in the apartment of the defendant, Nancy Christian. They knew each other through a mutual friend. On the day of the accident, the plaintiff came to the defendant's apartment to ask her to drive him to the airport to catch a flight, and she agreed.

The plaintiff requested to use the bathroom and a water faucet handle broke off in his hand, leaving him with severed tendons and nerve damage.

The defendant had complained to the landlord about the broken handle but did not warn the plaintiff. The trial judge granted summary judgment to the defendant, and the plaintiff appealed.

== Decision ==
=== Majority opinion ===
Justice Raymond E. Peters wrote the majority opinion, which explained that common law distinctions between an invitee, licensee, and trespasser traditionally determined the duty of care owed by a possessor of land to a plaintiff. A duty of care to warn about the dangerous condition of an area is owed to invitees and licensees under the distinctions but not to trespassers.

The majority considered the classifications to be an unhelpful shortcut to determine negligence, and that a general duty of care should be owed to all visitors to land. The summary judgment for the defendant was reversed because the defendant should have warned the plaintiff of the broken handle.

The most "rhetorically powerful passage" from Rowland is as follows:

A man's life or limb does not become less worthy of protection by the law nor a loss less worthy of compensation under the law because he has come upon the land of another without permission or with permission but without a business purpose. Reasonable people do not ordinarily vary their conduct depending upon such matters, and to focus upon the status of the injured party as a trespasser, licensee, or invitee in order to determine the question whether the landowner has a duty of care, is contrary to our modern social mores and humanitarian values. The common law rules obscure rather than illuminate the proper considerations which should govern determination of the question of duty.

As of 2000, Rowland had inspired appellate courts in at least nine other U.S. states and the District of Columbia to completely abandon the traditional distinctions between invitees, licensees, and trespassers, while 14 other U.S. states were persuaded by Rowland to modify and simplify those distinctions.

=== Dissenting opinion ===
Justice Louis H. Burke wrote a dissenting opinion in which fellow conservative Justice Marshall F. McComb concurred. Burke argued that the majority had unnecessarily thrown away centuries of clear precedent for a future of "potentially unlimited liability." He felt that such a dramatic change in the law should come from the legislature.
