= American rule =

American rule may refer to:

- American rule (attorney's fees), controlling assessment of attorneys' fees arising out of litigation
- American rule (property), stating that there is no implied duty upon the lessor as against wrongdoers to lessee's right of possession
- American rule (successive assignments), rule for successive assignments of rights

== See also ==
- English rule (disambiguation)
