= Watson v Maurice =

Watson v Maurice was a personal liability claim for injury in Alberta, Canada that arose when the defendant discharged a firearm causing the complainant loss of manual dexterity. The novelty of the case lies in the fact that the complainant was a trespasser when the shot was fired.

The United Conservative Party government of Alberta on November 6, 2019 responded with a bill to prevent homeowners from being sued if they injure people committing crimes on their properties.
