= English rule =

English rule may refer to:

- English rule (attorney's fees), a common use of the term
- Golden rule (law), also known as British rule or English rule, a rule of statutory construction

== See also ==
- American rule (disambiguation)
- British Rule (disambiguation)
