= Commonwealth v. Introvigne =

Australian High Court case

- Court: High Court of Australia
- Decided: 3 August 1982
- Citation: 201

Case history
- Prior actions: Re Roldano Introvigne By His Next Friend and Father Tarcisio Introvigne v the Commonwealth of Australia; Bunning and Madden; Bunning and Madden (A Firm)
- Appealed from: Federal Court of Australia

Case opinions
- The duty of schools to care for their pupils is not able to be delegated.

Keywords
- Duty of care, Tort law

Commonwealth v. Introvigne was a High Court of Australia decision handed down on 3 August 1982 concerning the principle of non-delegable duty of care. A student was injured after part of a flagpole fell on him, and successfully sought damages from the Commonwealth for their injury. It established in Australian law that schools have a non-delegable duty of care towards their pupils.

== Background ==
Roldano Introvigne was a 15 year old student at Woden Valley High School in Canberra, Australian Capital Territory (ACT). Woden Valley High School, whilst in the ACT and so under the direct responsibility of the Commonwealth, was operated by the Department of Education of the State of New South Wales. The teachers of the school were employed and paid by the Government of New South Wales, which was then reimbursed by the Commonwealth. On the morning of 19 February 1971, the deputy principal called a meeting with all the staff, as the school principal had died overnight. There was only one teacher left to supervise all 900 students at the school who were gathered in the school quadrangle. Several of the boys, including Roldano, congregated around the flagpole. The boys started swinging on the halyard of the school flagpole. Shortly afterwards, whilst no one was swinging on it, Roldano was standing near the pole when a 7-kilogram (15 lb) part of the flag assembly, the truck containing the pulleys, fell 35 feet (11 m) onto his head. He was seriously injured, with a major skull fracture, injuries to the right side of his brain, left side paralysis and loss of speech. He remained in a critical condition for over a week following the accident and remained in hospital for about three months. Continued effects of the slight, but permanent brain damage he received included headaches, some loss of memory, and some loss of subtle control of his left hand.

== Case ==
After a five year wait, in 1976 the case was first heard in the Supreme Court of the ACT. Roldano's father had filed suit on his behalf. The case was originally against the Commonwealth, the architects who designed the flagpole and the company who erected it.

The Supreme Court dismissed the case, and it was subsequently appealed to the Federal Court, which heard the case in 1980. In its judgement handed down on 25 September 1980, the Federal Court found that the Commonwealth was liable as the teachers had been negligent by providing inadequate supervision. It did not find the architects liable though, and they were dropped from the case. Introvigne had already dropped the builders of the pole from the appeal. The Commonwealth then appealed the case to the High Court, on the grounds that it could not be held liable, since the State of NSW had been subcontracted to operate the school, and as a result, it did not have any control over the actions of the staff of the school.

The High Court found in favour of Introvigne, dismissed the appeal with costs and remitted the case to the Supreme Court of the ACT determine damages.

== Judgement ==
The main judgement was written by Justice Mason, with Chief Justice Gibbs and Justices Brennan and Murphy concurring. Justice Aickin had also attended the hearings and written a concurring judgement, but died before it was delivered. His judgement was not included, but was referenced by the other judges.

In its judgement the High Court largely affirmed the decision of the Federal Court. It found that the Commonwealth was not able to discharge its duty of care to the students by contracting the State of NSW to operate the school, and that the Commonwealth held a non-delegable duty of care.

The Court found that, as the Commonwealth had required all children from the ages of 6 to 15 to attend a school operated by or on behalf of the Commonwealth, or one approved by the Commonwealth, it was responsible for the care of those children, regardless of whether they had engaged the State of NSW to operate the school.

It disagreed with the Federal Court on the test of foreseeability used, to determine if it was foreseeable that the pupils would swing on the halyard. The Federal Court had used the "more likely than not" test, and stated that it was "more likely than not" that the pupils would swing on the halyard. The High Court judged that this was an inappropriate test of foreseeability, and took the opportunity to make it clear that the test used should have been the less stringent test of "not far-fetched or fanciful". However, despite setting a precedent, this had no practical effect on the outcome of the case.

In his judgement, Justice Mason said that;

The immaturity and inexperience of the pupils and their propensity for mischief suggest that there should be a special responsibility on a school authority to care for their safety, one that goes beyond a mere vicarious liability for the acts and omissions of its servants.

On the effect on liability of the Commonwealth contracting the State of NSW to operate the school he also stated,

In my opinion, the Commonwealth does not cease to be liable because it arranges for the State to run the school on its behalf.

Justice Murphy, in his concurring judgement summed up the placement of liability as follows,

In this case the damage to the plaintiff may be attributed to causes for which the Commonwealth is liable, unsafe premises and lack of supervision of the children. It is enough that Introvigne's injuries were due to the inadequate system of supervision and care. The system did not provide for sufficient staff to exercise proper supervision over the children in the playground. As well, there was a failure to ensure that the system was carried out. The departure from the system by the teachers was understandable because of the death of the school principal, but this does not excuse the breach by the Commonwealth of this non-delegable duty.

Since being handed down, Commonwealth v. Introvigne has been cited in over 200 cases, including 21 cases of the High Court of Australia.
