= Masoveria =

A masoveria contract is a Catalan institution dating back to the tenth century and still in wide practice. It is a form of sharecropping by which the owner of a rural farm commissions a natural person (masover, or tenant farmer) to work in the farm in exchange for a percentage of the results of the crop or farm production. It usually involves also the right to live on the estate, often in a property different from the main building, properly known as masoveria.

Within the masoveria concept there are contracts that do not involve farming but refer to other services related with the running or the maintenance of a property, such as gardener, cook, driver, etc.

In the twenty-first century the medieval concept is getting expanded into what is called masoveria urbana, which is basically an interpretation of the rural masoveria institution applied to urban real estate. It consists in the right to live on someone else's property in exchange for repairs and improvements of the estate. Faced with the bursting of the housing bubble and the impact of its economic consequences since 2008, many social groups have been looking for alternative, more supportive and sustainable ways to guarantee their right to housing.

The idea is that the owner of an unoccupied building or house assigns the right to live in the property to a person or group of people who, in exchange for not paying rent, undertake to renovate and / or keep the house in good condition. In fact, it is a system that benefits both parties: on the one hand, it allows people without resources to find alternatives to housing beyond sheltered housing, which is also in short supply; on the other hand, it gives the owner the opportunity to ensure that his property receives maintenance while contributing to a social purpose. Many cities and towns in Catalonia have adhered to this idea and give advice and procure assistance to set up such contracts.

== History ==
Established at the beginning of the Catalan counties independence from Frankish rule (tenth century), it drew from its gothic predecessor, derived in its turn from the Roman institution of the apartiarius, or sharing parts. Historically this figure has been primarily used in those territories where direct farming was less profitable. By means of the masoveria, owners of large estates ensured the maximum possible yield of their possessions by means of the atomisation of the unit of exploitation, and especially by means of sharing risks with a direct exploiter absolutely dependent of the profitability of this exploitation.
