= British Rule (disambiguation) =

British Raj, or British Rule, was the rule of the British Empire in the Indian subcontinent between 1858 and 1947.

British Rule may also refer to:

- British Rule (card game), variation to the rules of card games
- Golden rule (law), also known as British rule or English rule, a rule of statutory construction

== See also ==
- British Empire
- English rule (disambiguation)
