= Slip and fall =

Type of accidental injury or death

A slip and fall injury, also known as a trip and fall, is a premises liability claim, a type of personal injury claim or case based on a person slipping (or tripping) on the premises of another and, as a result, suffering injury. It is a tort. A person who is injured by falling may be entitled to monetary compensation for the injury from the owner or person in possession of the premises where the injury occurred.

Liability for slip or trip and fall injuries may arise based upon a defendant's ownership of the premises where the injury occurred, their control of the premises, or both. For example, a store may be liable for a slip-and-fall injury that occurs inside of its premises, even though it rents those premises, because it has exclusive control of the interior of the rented property. The owner of the premises (the store's landlord) may have sole or shared liability for an injury that occurs outside of the store's exclusive premises, such as the injury from a fall on the sidewalk or in the parking lot of a shopping mall.

== Defences ==
Property owners have two basic defenses to slip and fall claims:

- Lack of negligence: The defendant may argue that they were not negligent in creating the condition that caused a person to slip, or were not negligent in correcting the condition before injury occurred. For example, the owner of a grocery store may claim that the banana that a patron slipped upon had been dropped on the floor only moments before the incident by another patron, and that, in the exercise of due diligence, a typical store owner acting with reasonable care would not have had time to discover the hazard and take measures to mitigate the unsafe condition.
- Lack of fault: The defendant may claim that the injured person was responsible for their own injury. For example, the owner may claim that any reasonable patron, exercising due diligence for their own safety, would see a banana peel on the floor, and take those measures necessary to avoid slipping on it.

== Evidential requirements ==
All slip and fall claims must be supported with sufficient evidence of negligence by owner or operator of the premises. Some examples of evidences are:

- Photographs of the accident scene.
- Videos of the incident.
- Housekeeping policies and procedures.
- A copy of one's medical records.
- Statements of witnesses.
- Footage or other records of the accident.

In some instances, tribology measurements of the floor surface coefficient of friction are used to substantiate claims of inadequate floor characteristics or condition.

== See also ==
- Premises liability
- Wet floor sign
- Fall (injury)
