= Sharecropping =

Use of land by a tenant in return for a share of the crops produced

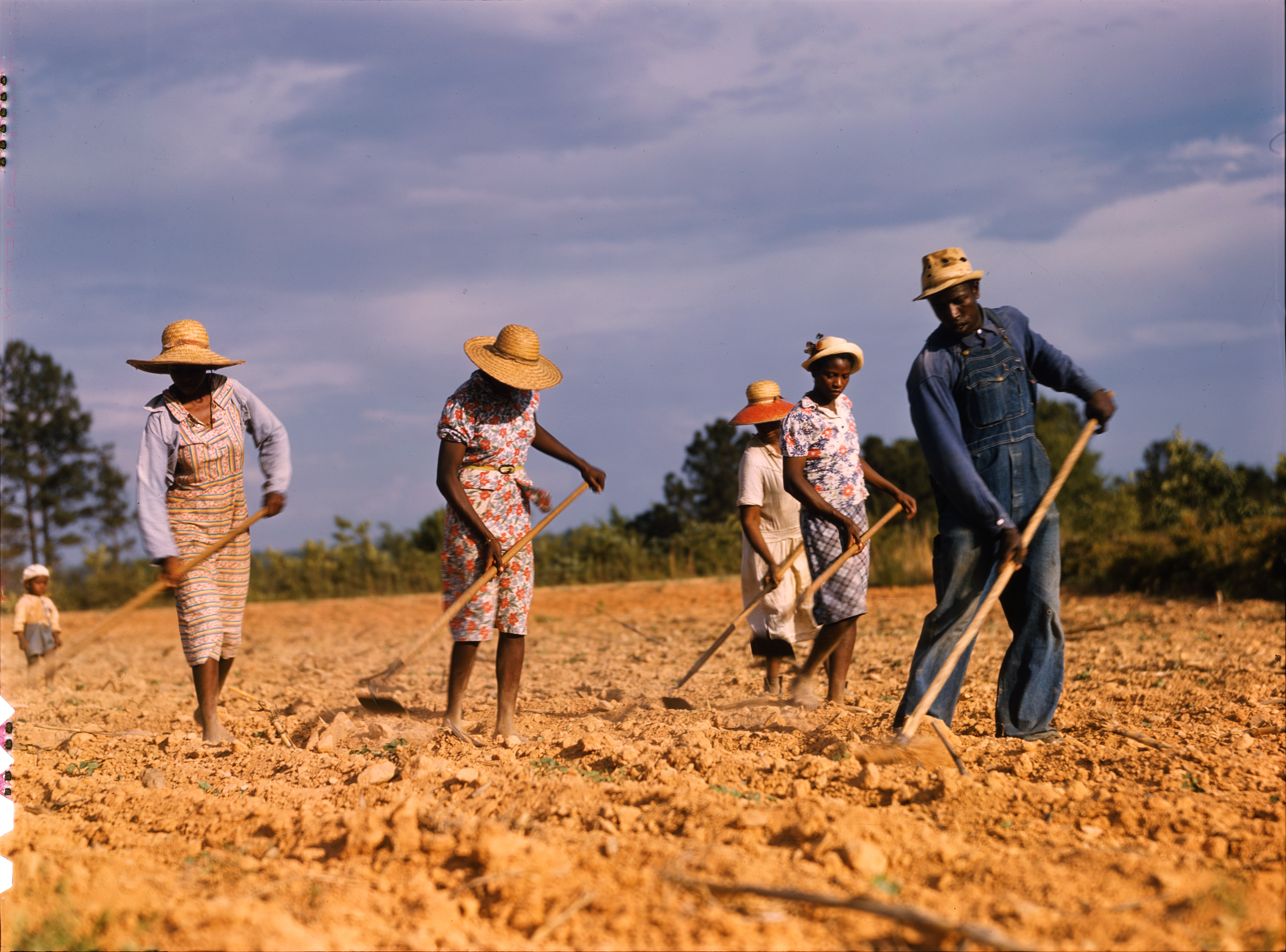
A Farm Security Administration photo of a cropper family chopping the weeds from cotton near White Plains, in Georgia, US (1941)

Sharecropping is the legal arrangement in which a landowner allows a tenant (sharecropper) to use the land in return for a share of the crops produced on that land. Sharecropping differs from tenant farming, which gives the tenant greater autonomy and higher economic and social status.

Sharecropping may be a traditional, legally governed land arrangement. The French métayage, the Catalan masoveria, the Castilian mediero, the Polish połownictwo and Russian izdolshchina, the Italian mezzadria, and the Islamic system of muzara‘a (المزارعة), are examples of legal systems that have supported sharecropping.

== Overview ==
Under a sharecropping agreement, landowners provide land and other necessities such as housing, tools, seed, or working animals. Local merchants provide food and other supplies to the sharecropper on credit. In exchange for the land and supplies, the cropper pays the owner a share of the crop at the end of the season, typically one-half to two-thirds. The cropper uses his share to pay off his debt to the merchant. If there is any cash left over, the cropper keeps it—but if it comes to less than what they owe, they remain in debt.

A new credit system, the crop lien, became closely associated with sharecropping. Under this system, a planter or merchant extended a line of credit to the sharecropper while taking the year's crop as collateral. The sharecropper could then draw food and supplies throughout the year. When the crop was harvested, the planter or merchant who held the lien sold the harvest on the sharecropper's behalf and settled the debt.

Sociologist Jeffery M. Paige distinguished between centralized sharecropping on cotton plantations and decentralized sharecropping with other crops. The former is characterized by long-lasting tenure. Tenants are tied to the landlord through the plantation store. As markets penetrate, this form of tenure tends to be replaced by paid salaries. Decentralized sharecropping gives the landlord virtually no role: plots are scattered, peasants manage their own labor, and landowners do not manufacture the crops. This form of tenure becomes more common when markets penetrate.

Farmers who farmed land belonging to others but owned their own mule and plow were called tenant farmers; they owed the landowner a smaller share of their crops because the landowner did not have to provide as many supplies.

== Application by region ==
Historically, sharecropping occurred extensively in Ireland, Scotland, and colonial Africa. Use of the sharecropper system has also been identified in England (as the practice of "farming to halves"). It was widely used in the Southern United States during the Reconstruction era (1865–1877) that followed the American Civil War, which was economically devastating to the Southern states. It is still used in many rural poor areas of the world today, notably in Pakistan, India, and Bangladesh.

=== Africa ===
In settler colonies in Africa, sharecropping was common in agricultural life. White farmers, who owned most of the land, often couldn't work their entire farm because they lacked capital. Therefore, they had African farmers to work the excess on a sharecropping basis.

In South Africa the 1913 Natives' Land Act outlawed the ownership of land by Africans in areas designated for white ownership and effectively reduced the status of most sharecroppers to tenant farmers and then to farm laborers. In the 1960s, generous subsidies to white farmers meant most farmers could afford to work their entire farms, and sharecropping faded.

The arrangement has reappeared in other African countries in modern times, including Ghana and Zimbabwe.

Economic historian Pius S. Nyambara argued that Eurocentric historiographical devices such as "feudalism" or "slavery" often qualified by weak prefixes like "semi-" or "quasi-" are not helpful in understanding the antecedents and functions of sharecropping in Africa.

=== Scotland ===
Half-foot (Scottish Gaelic: leth-chois, Scots: hauf-fit) was a kind of sharecropping peculiar to northern and western Scotland. The possessor, generally impoverished or without facilities to work the land, often provided the land and seed corn, and the tenant cultivated it, with the produce divided equally between them. Instances of this occurred in the 20th century.

=== United States ===
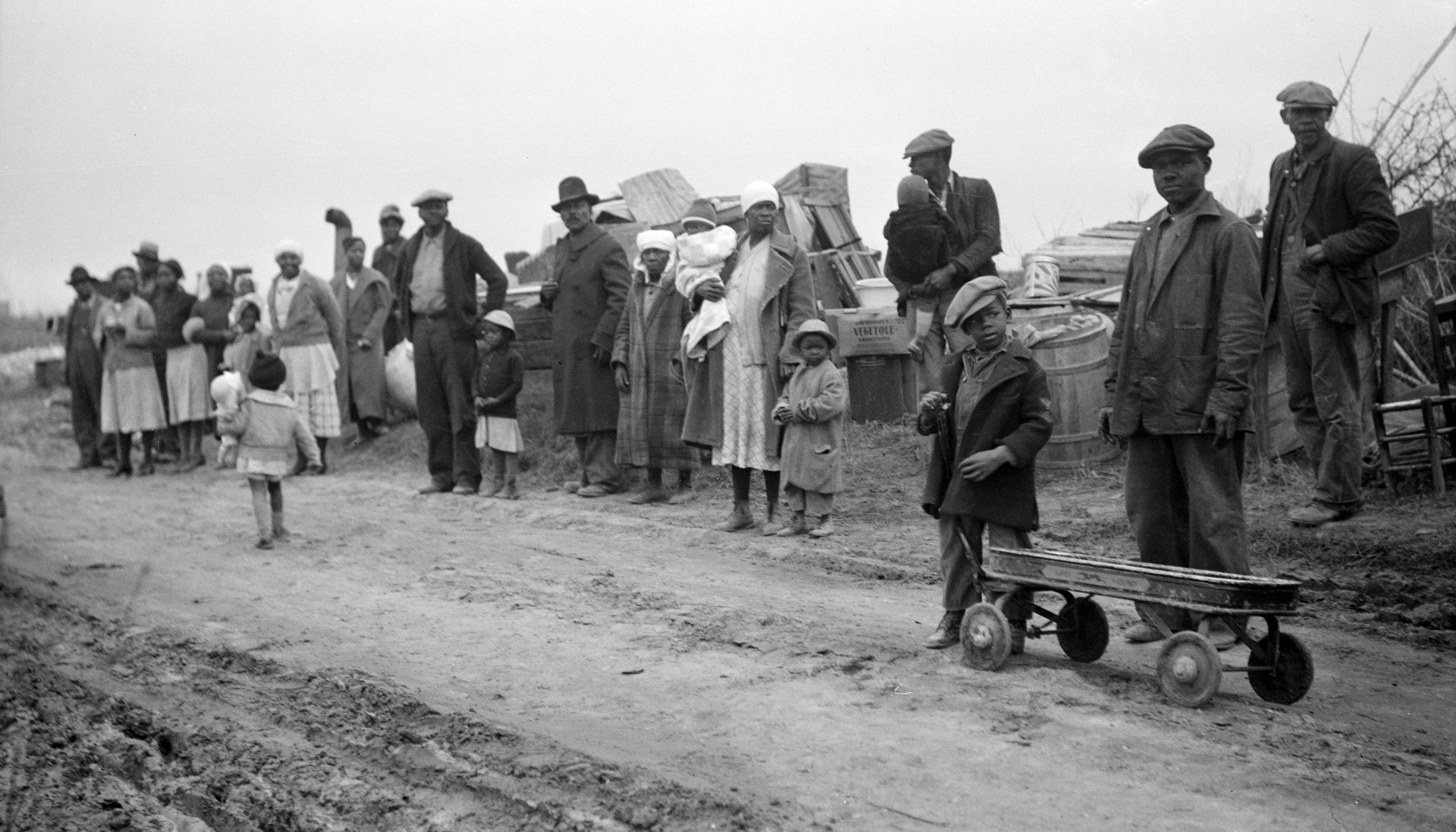
Sharecroppers on the roadside after they were evicted for membership in the Southern Tenant Farmers Union (January 1936)

Even prior to the Civil War, sharecropping is known to have existed in Mississippi and is believed to have been in place in Tennessee. However, it did not become widespread in the South until the economic upheaval caused by the American Civil War and the end of slavery during and after Reconstruction. It is theorized that sharecropping in the United States originated in the Natchez District, roughly centered in Adams County, Mississippi with its county seat, Natchez.

After the war, the federal government seized plantations and other lands throughout the South. In January 1865, General William T. Sherman issued Special Field Orders No. 15, which announced that he would temporarily grant newly freed families 40 acres of this seized land on the islands and coastal regions of Georgia. Many believed that this policy would be extended to all former slaves and their families as repayment for their treatment at the end of the war. In the summer of 1865, President Andrew Johnson, as one of the first acts of Reconstruction, instead ordered all land under federal control be returned to the owners from whom it had been seized.

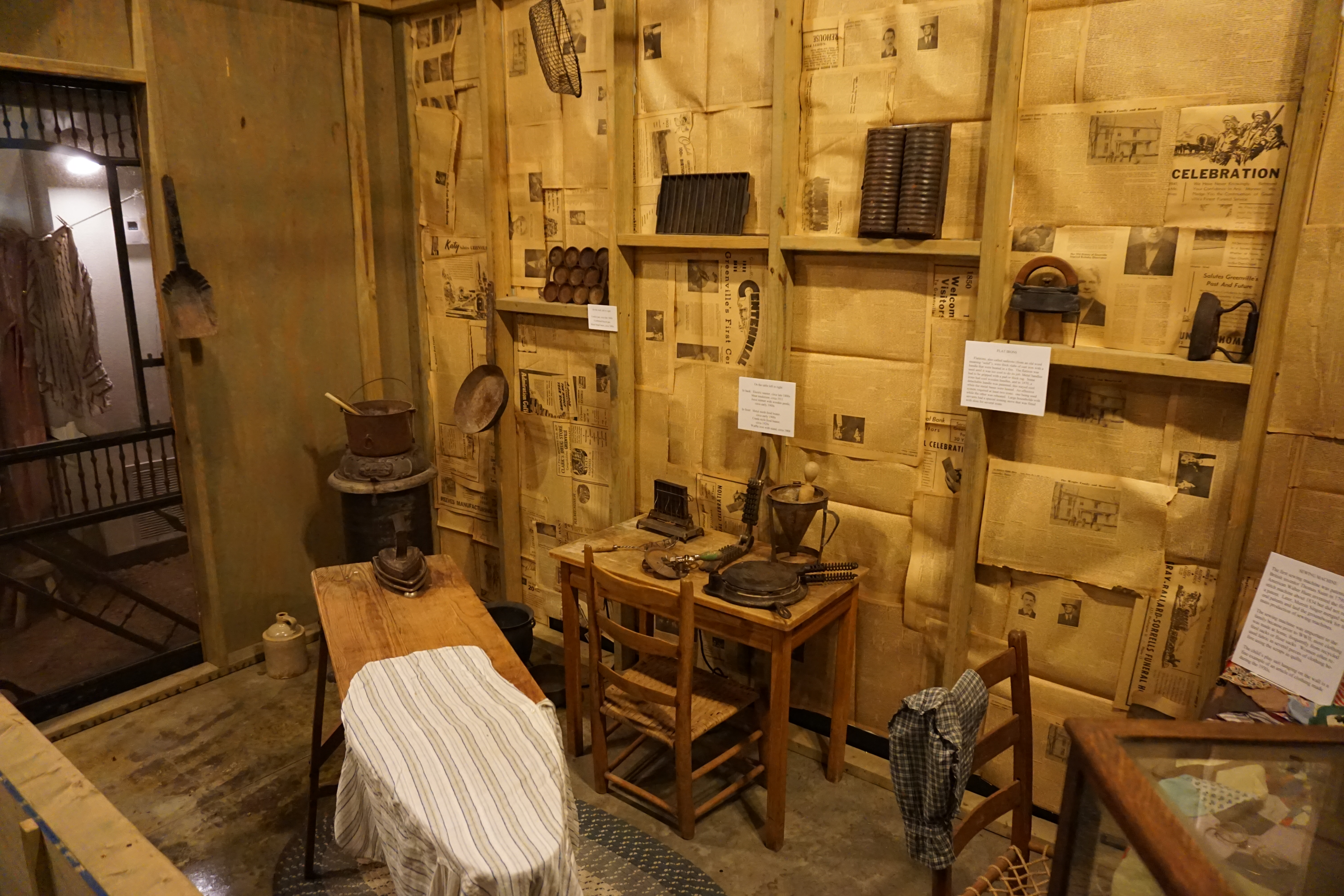
An early 20th century Texas sharecropper's home diorama at the Audie Murphy American Cotton Museum, in Greenville, Texas 2015

Southern landowners thus found themselves with a great deal of land but no liquid assets to pay for labor. They also maintained the "belief that gangs afforded the most efficient means of labor organization", something nearly all former slaves resisted. Preferring "to organize themselves into kin groups", as well as "minimize chances for white male-black female contact by removing their female kin from work environments supervised closely by whites", black southerners were "determined to resist the old slave ways". Notwithstanding, many former slaves, now called freedmen, having no land or other assets of their own, needed to work to support their families. A sharecropping system centered on cotton, a major cash crop, developed in response. Large plantations were subdivided into plots sharecroppers could work. Initially, sharecroppers in the American South were almost all formerly enslaved black people, but eventually cash-strapped indigent white farmers were integrated into the system. During Reconstruction, the federal Freedmen's Bureau ordered the arrangements for freedmen and wrote and enforced their contracts.

American sharecroppers worked a section of the plantation independently. In South Carolina, Georgia, Alabama, and Mississippi, cotton was usually the dominant crop. In other areas it could be tobacco, rice, or sugar. At harvest time the crop was sold and the cropper received half of cash paid for the crop on his parcel. Sharecroppers also often received their farming tools and all other goods from the landowner they were contracted with. Landowners dictated decisions relating to the crop mix, and sharecroppers were often in agreements to sell their portion of the crop back to the landowner, thus being subjected to manipulated prices. In addition to this, landowners, threatening to not renew the lease at the end of the growing season, were able to apply pressure to their tenants. Sharecropping often proved economically problematic, as the landowners held significant economic control.

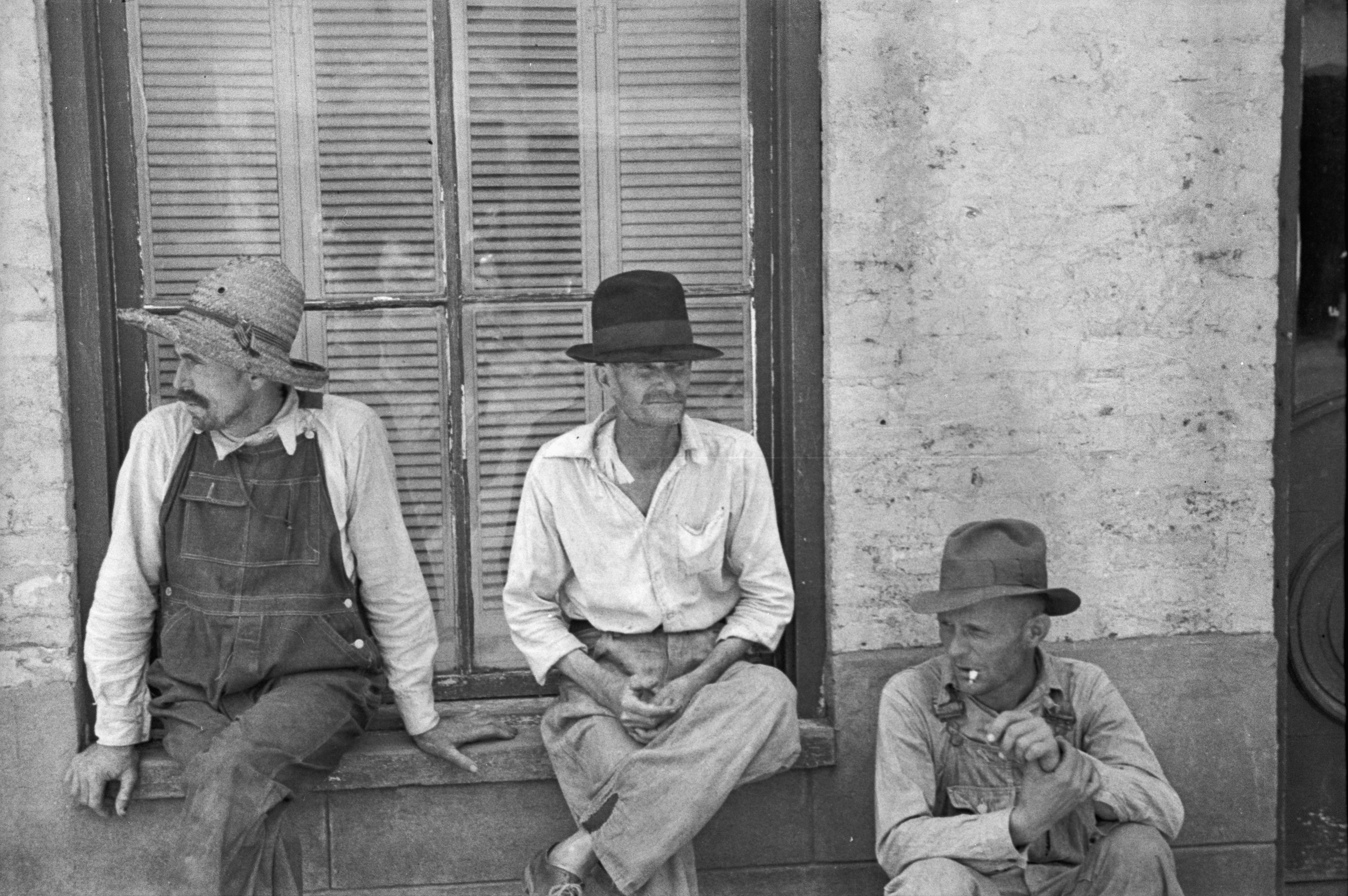
Cotton sharecroppers, Hale County, Alabama, 1936

In the Reconstruction Era, sharecropping was one of the few options for penniless freedmen to support themselves and their families. Other solutions included the crop-lien system (where the farmer was extended credit for seed and other supplies by the merchant), a rent labor system (where the farmer rents the land but keeps their entire crop), and the wage system (worker earns a fixed wage but keeps none of their crop). Sharecropping as historically practiced in the American South was more economically productive than the gang system plantations using slave labor, though less productive than modern agricultural techniques.

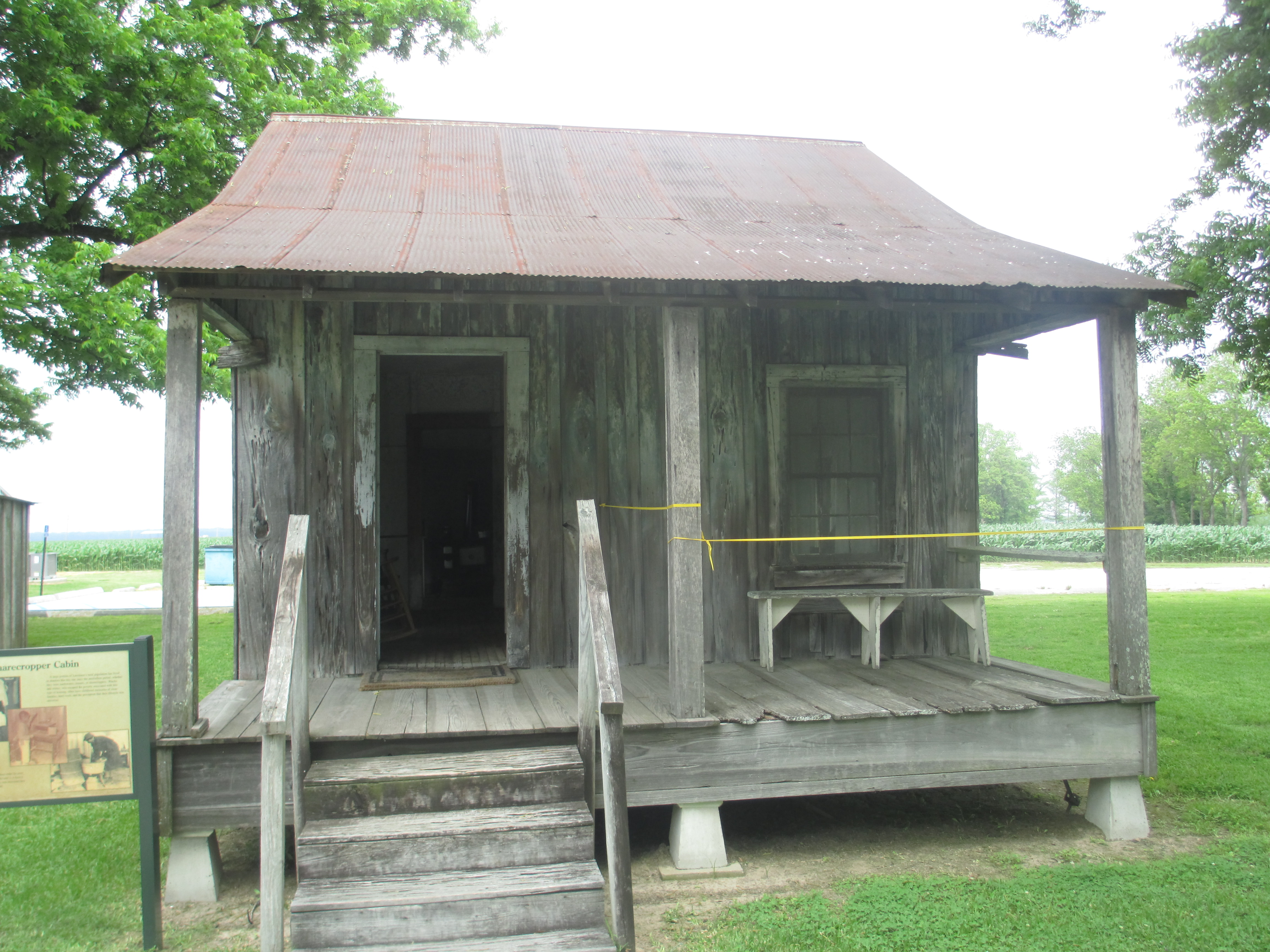
Sharecropper's cabin displayed at Louisiana State Cotton Museum in Lake Providence, Louisiana (2013 photo)

Sharecropping remained a significant institution in many states for decades after the Civil War. By the early 1930s, the United States had 5.5 million white tenant farmers, sharecroppers, and mixed cropping/laborers, and 3 million Black people. In Tennessee, sharecroppers operated approximately one-third of all farm units in the state in the 1930s, with white people making up two-thirds or more of the sharecroppers. In Mississippi, by 1900, 36% of all white farmers were tenants or sharecroppers, while 85% of black farmers were. In Georgia, fewer than 16,000 farms were operated by black owners in 1910, while, at the same time, African-Americans managed 106,738 farms as tenants.

Around this time, sharecroppers began forming unions to protest poor treatment, starting in Tallapoosa County, Alabama, in 1931 and in Arkansas in 1934. The Southern Tenant Farmers Union included both blacks and poor whites, who used meetings, protests, and labor strikes to push for better treatment. The success of these actions frightened and enraged landlords, who responded with aggressive tactics. Landless farmers who fought the sharecropping system were socially denounced, harassed by legal and illegal means, and physically attacked by officials, landlords' agents, or, in extreme cases, angry mobs. Sharecroppers' strikes in Arkansas and the Missouri Bootheel, the 1939 Missouri Sharecroppers' Strike, were documented in the newsreel Oh Freedom After While. The plight of a sharecropper was addressed in the song "Sharecropper's Blues", recorded by Charlie Barnet and His Orchestra in 1944.

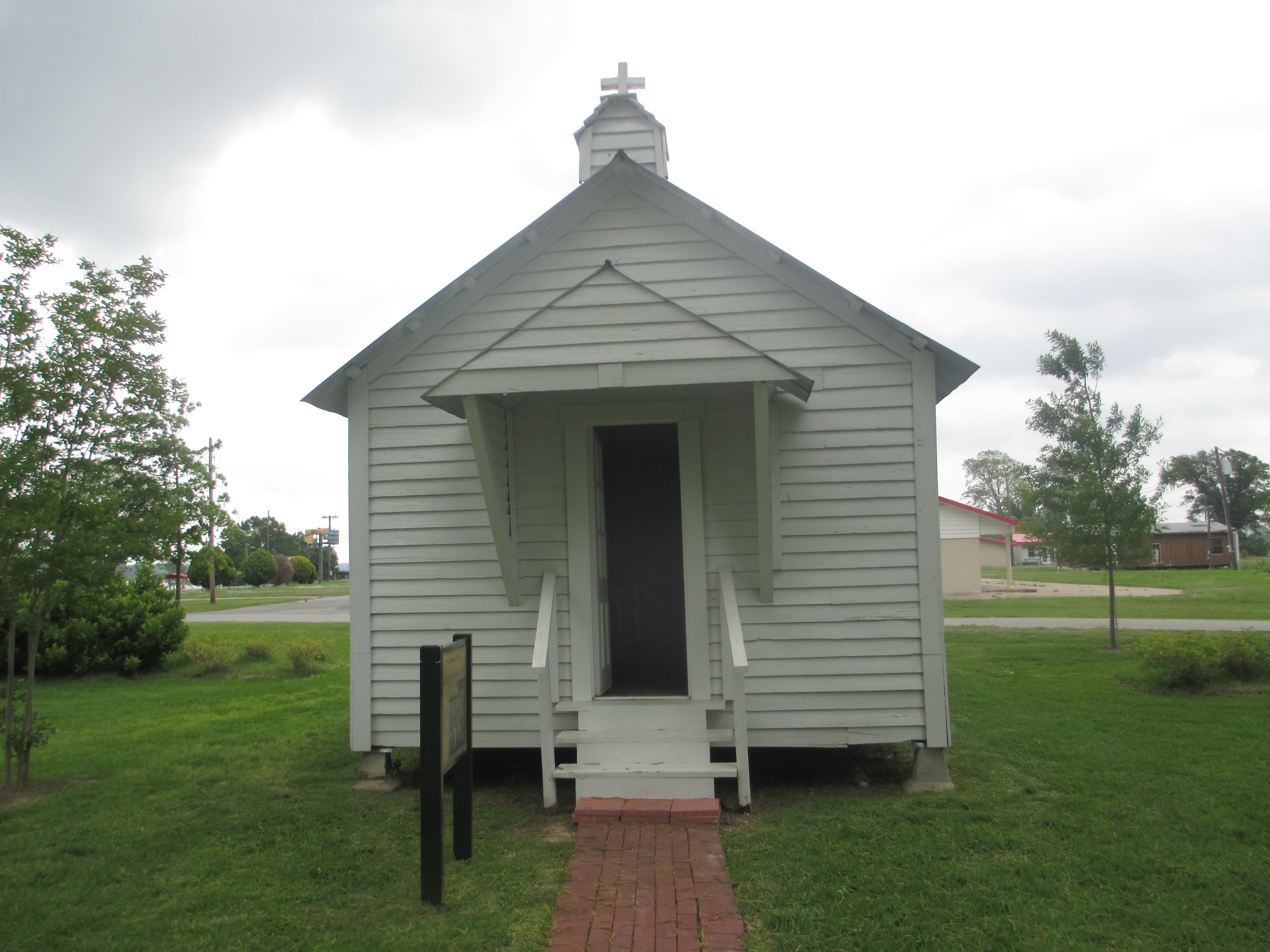
Sharecroppers' chapel at Cotton Museum in Lake Providence

The sharecropping system in the U.S. increased during the Great Depression with the creation of tenant farmers following the failure of many small farms throughout the Dustbowl. Traditional sharecropping declined after mechanization of farm work became economical beginning in the late 1930s and early 1940s. As a result, many sharecroppers were forced off the farms and migrated to cities to work in factories, or became migrant workers in the Western United States during World War II.

On August 6, 1966, the American Congress under the then president Lyndon B. Johnson, abolished peonage. After the government did this, sharecropping began to disappear rapidly throughout the United States. Mississippi was the last state to end the system, in 1995, under then-president Bill Clinton.

==== Sharecropping and socioeconomic status ====
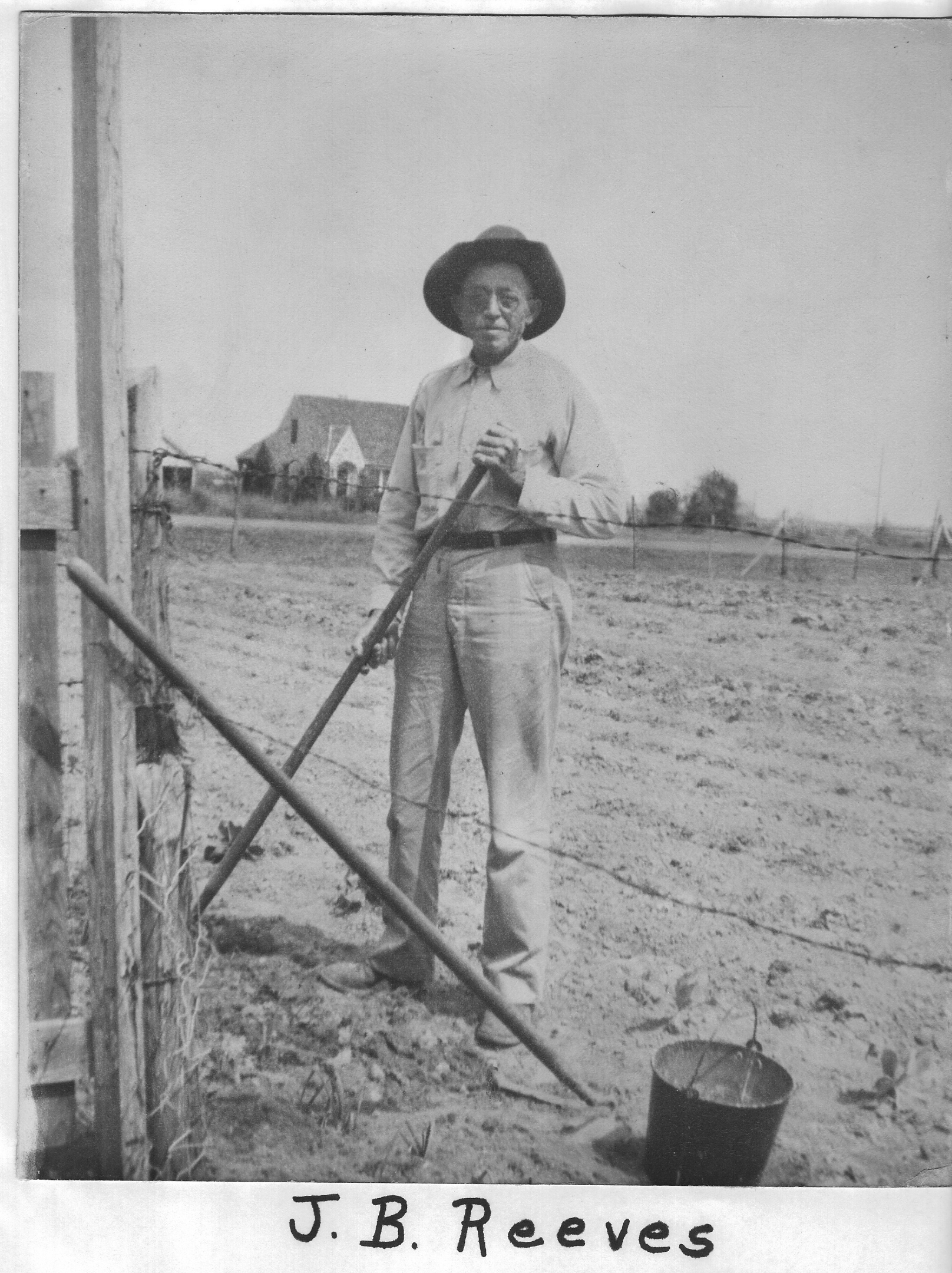
White sharecropper, J. B. Reeves, in Tomball, Texas.

Since the Gilded Age, poor whites increasingly practiced sharecropping. By the Great Depression, about two-thirds of sharecroppers were white, the rest black, and no evidence exists of any other races being sharecroppers in the United States. Sharecroppers, the poorest of the poor, organized for better conditions. The racially integrated Southern Tenant Farmers Union helped sharecroppers gain improvements in the 1930s. Sharecropping had diminished in the 1940s due to the Great Depression, farm mechanization, and other factors.

== Impacts ==
Sharecropping may have harmed tenants, with many cases of high interest rates, unpredictable harvests, and unscrupulous landlords and merchants keeping tenant farm families severely indebted. Debt often compounded year after year, leaving the cropper vulnerable to intimidation and shortchanging. Nevertheless, it appeared to be inevitable, with no serious alternative unless the croppers left agriculture.

Landlords opt for sharecropping to avoid the administrative costs and shirking that occur on plantations and haciendas. Landlords prefer cash tenancy because cash tenants bear all the risks, and any harvest failure hurts them, not the landlord. As a result, they tend to demand lower rents than sharecroppers.

Some economists have argued that sharecropping is not as exploitative as it is often perceived. John Heath and Hans P. Binswanger write that "evidence from around the world suggests that sharecropping is often a way for differently endowed enterprises to pool resources to mutual benefit, overcoming credit restraints and helping to manage risk."

Sharecropping agreements can be made fairly, as a form of tenant farming or sharefarming with a variable rental payment paid in arrears. There are three different types of contracts.

1. Workers can rent plots of land from the owner for a certain sum and keep the whole crop.
2. Workers work on the land and earn a fixed wage from the landowner but keep some of the crop.
3. No money changes hands, but the worker and landowner each keep a share of the crop.

According to sociologist Edward Royce, "adherents of the neoclassical approach" argued that sharecropping incentivized laborers by giving them a vested interest in the crop. American plantations were wary of this interest, as they feared it would lead African Americans to demand partnership rights. Many Black laborers rejected the unilateral authority landowners sought, further complicating relations between landowners and sharecroppers.

Sharecropping may have allowed women access to arable land, though not as owners, in places where ownership rights were vested only in men.

== Economic theories of share tenancy ==
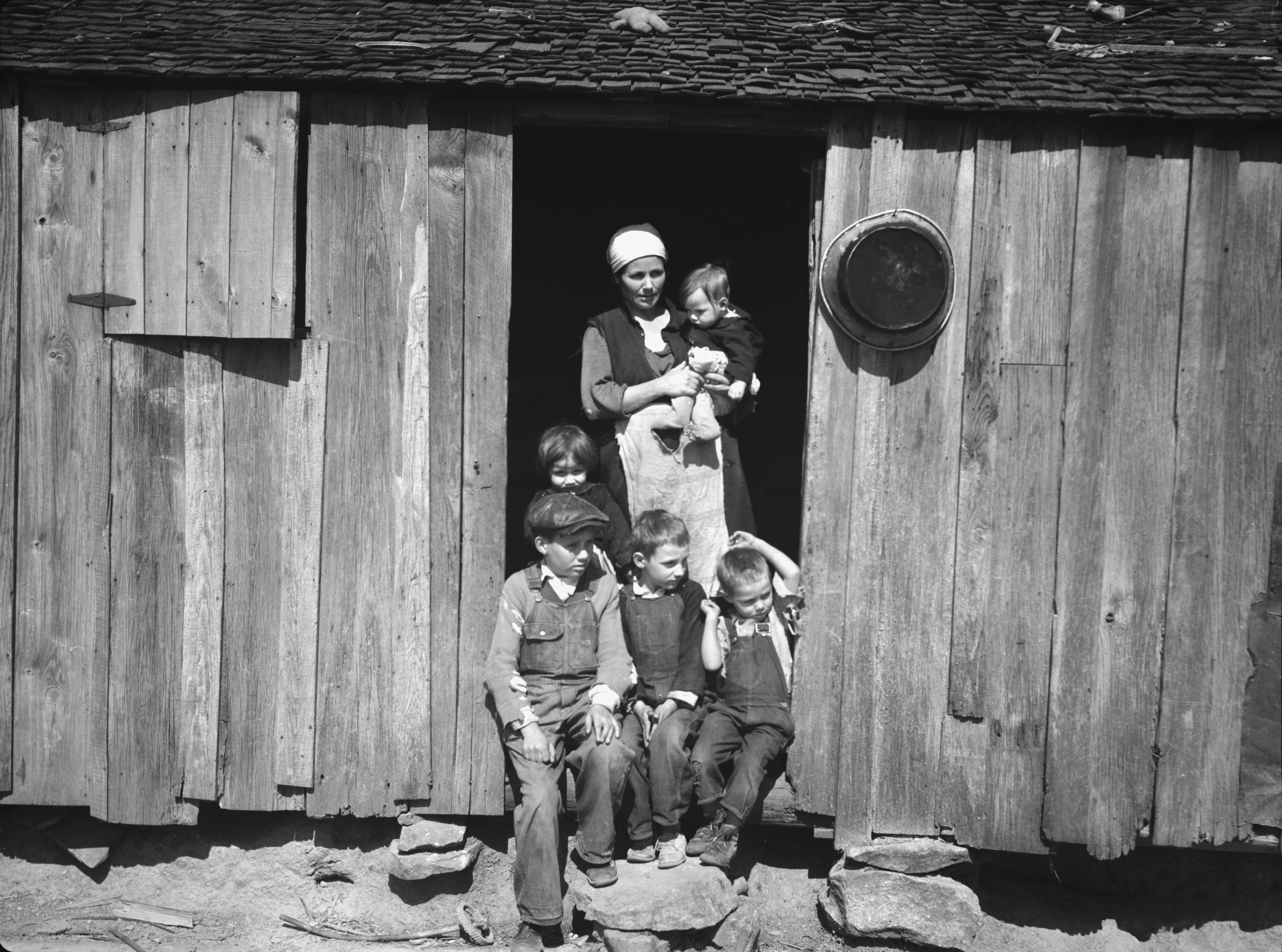
A sharecropper family in Walker County, Alabama (c. 1937)

The theory of share tenancy was long dominated by Alfred Marshall's famous footnote in Book VI, Chapter X.14 of Principles where he illustrated the inefficiency of agricultural share-contracting. Steven N.S. Cheung (1969), challenged this view, showing that with sufficient competition and in the absence of transaction costs, share tenancy will be equivalent to competitive labor markets and therefore efficient.

He also showed that in the presence of transaction costs, share-contracting may be preferred to either wage contracts or rent contracts—due to the mitigation of labor shirking and the provision of risk sharing. Joseph Stiglitz (1974, 1988), suggested that if share tenancy is only a labor contract, then it is only pairwise-efficient and that land-to-the-tiller reform would improve social efficiency by removing the necessity for labor contracts in the first place.

Reid (1973), Murrel (1983), Roumasset (1995) and Allen and Lueck (2004) provided transaction cost theories of share-contracting, wherein tenancy is more of a partnership than a labor contract and both landlord and tenant provide multiple inputs. It has also been argued that the sharecropping institution can be explained by factors such as informational asymmetry (Hallagan, 1978; Allen, 1982; Muthoo, 1998), moral hazard (Reid, 1976; Eswaran and Kotwal, 1985; Ghatak and Pandey, 2000), intertemporal discounting (Roy and Serfes, 2001), price fluctuations (Sen, 2011) or limited liability (Shetty, 1988; Basu, 1992; Sengupta, 1997; Ray and Singh, 2001).

== See also ==
- Coolie
- Convict lease
- Metayage, a kind of sharecropping
- Peonage
- Rent-seeking
- Rural tenancy
- Sharefarming
- Sharemilking
- Tenant farmer
- Wage slavery
