= American rule (property) =

Rule of possession in property law

In property law, the American rule of possession states that a landlord is obligated only to deliver legal possession, but not actual possession, of a leased premises to a tenant. Thus, if a tenant arrives at a leased premises only to discover that it is still inhabited by a previous tenant who is holding over, or by squatters, it is the tenant who has standing to sue for eviction and/or damages, and not the landlord. The tenant may not cancel the lease or refuse to pay rent due to the landlord for the time that the tenant is out of actual possession of the lease. The American rule survives in only a minority of jurisdictions.

By contrast, the English rule states that in such a scenario, the tenant may cancel the lease, obligating the landlord to deliver not only legal possession but also actual possession, and giving the landlord standing to sue the party in wrongful possession of the premises.

The nomenclature of the American rule runs contrary to the general tendency in property law, where American law evolved out of and in many instances diverged from English property law: the American rule is the original default rule, and the English rule, having been passed subsequently in England, began to be adopted by an increasing number of American jurisdictions following the ruling in Hannan v. Dusch, 153 S.E. 824 (1930).

== See also ==
- Leasehold estate
