= Rural tenancy =

Rural tenancy refers to a type of sharecropping or tenancy arrangement that a landowner can use to make full use of property he may not otherwise be able to develop properly. A "tenant" or non-landowner will take residency on the property of the landowner and work the land in exchange for giving the landowner a percentage of the profits from the eventual crop. Tenancy can be unintrusive (where the tenant provides home, transportation, tools, seed, etc.) in which case the landowner gives the tenant a large portion of the profits or it can be intrusive (where the landowner provides home, food, tools, seed, etc. on credit) in which case the landowner will keep most or even all of the profits. The term "rural tenancy" usually describes the situation of previously enslaved people that were now tenants on the landowner's property. The landowner would extend the farmer shelter, food, and necessary items on credit to be repaid out of the tenant's share of the crop. The landowner could, if he desired, charge the tenant extremely high interest on the advanced pay since there were no lending laws applicable to migrant or tenant workers at the time. This could ultimately result in the tenant owing the landlord more money than his share of the crop at harvest and forcing the farmer to be further indentured to the landowner. This practice was used frequently by landowners in the South after slavery was abolished. Modern-day tenancy is much more highly regulated and these practices are less common.

A "tenant" or non-landowner will take residency on the property of the landowner and work the land in exchange for giving the landowner a percentage of the profits from the eventual crop.

== See also ==
- Peonage
