= Case v. Minot =

1893 Supreme Court of Massachusetts case

Case v. Minot, 158 Mass. 577 (1893), was a case decided by the Supreme Court of Massachusetts that was one of the first cases to hold that inaction by a landlord could establish a constructive eviction.

== Decision ==
The court held that the landlord was responsible for the constructive eviction of a tenant when the landlord allowed another lessee to obstruct the tenant's light and air. Traditionally, constructive eviction was only found when the landlord had acted intentionally to interfere with the tenant's possession of their lease.
