= Invitee =

In the law of torts, an invitee is a person who is invited to land by the possessor of the land as a member of the public or one who enters the land of another for the purpose of business dealings with the possessor of the land. The status of a visitor as an invitee (as opposed to a trespasser or a licensee) defines the legal rights of the visitor if they are injured due to the negligence of the property owner.

There are generally two types of invitees:.

- Business Invitee is a person who enters business property to do business with the land occupier.
- Public Invitee is a person who enters land in the possession of another for the purpose for which the property is held open to the public, even if no business purpose is involved.

Even if "invited" onto somebody's premises, a social guest is classified as a licensee.

The property owner has a duty to make the property safe for the invitee, which includes conducting a reasonable inspection of the premises to uncover hidden dangers. The property owner also has a duty to warn the invitee of hazardous conditions that cannot be fixed. Furthermore, property owners assume a duty to rescue an invitee who falls into peril while visiting the property. If an independent contractor hired by the landowner injures an invitee (intentionally or through negligence), the owner can be held vicariously liable. This represents the broadest duty of care owed to any class of visitors to the property.

== United States ==
An invitee is only an invitee within the scope of permission granted by the landowner. Thus, if an invitee is invited to do business in a store and is injured snooping around in the private storage area, he does not have invitee status in that area. So if the invitee is snooping around in the dark, trips and falls on something, the land occupier is not liable since the snooper exceeded the consent given him/her (Whelan v. Van Natta).

In California, the case of Rowland v. Christian sought to eliminate the distinction between business invitee and licensee in regard to a land occupier owing a duty to act as a "reasonable man" in rendering the property safe for others.

== See also ==
- Buffer Theory
