= Licensee =

Type of person under US tort law

A licensee can mean the holder of a license or, in U.S. tort law, is a person who is on the property of another, despite the fact that the property is not open to the general public, because the owner of the property has allowed the licensee to enter. The status of a visitor as a licensee (as opposed to a trespasser or an invitee) defines the legal rights of the visitor if they are injured due to the negligence of the property possessor (not necessarily the owner).

Where licensees are present, activities conducted on the land by or at the behest of the owner of the land must be conducted with the care that a prudent person would show. A duty to warn arises if there is a harmful condition on the land that is hidden from the licensee, so long as the landowner knows of this condition. The licensee falls between the anticipated or discovered trespasser and the invitee on the sliding scale of tort liability assessed to landowners. Whereas the anticipated trespasser needs to be protected from known man made conditions capable of causing death or serious injury, the licensee must be warned of all known dangers. However, unlike an invitee, a licensee has no standing to sue for dangerous conditions that "should have been" discovered by the property owner but were not actually known to the owner.

Under traditional common law, a property possessor (not necessarily the owner) has no duty whatsoever to trespassers. Some states retain the traditional common law rule, while other states, such as California, have imposed a reasonable duty of care toward all people who enter a property.

Even states that have retained the traditional common law rule regarding the absence of duty towards a trespasser may impose a duty of care towards certain kinds of trespassers. For example, a dangerous condition may effectively invite children to come onto the property. Such an attractive nuisance may impose a duty of care even towards trespassers.

Historically, emergency workers – police and firefighters – have been considered licensees, but they are barred from recovering from injuries caused by the risks inherent to their jobs. Generally such injuries are instead covered by worker's compensation.
