= Trespasser =

Person who trespasses

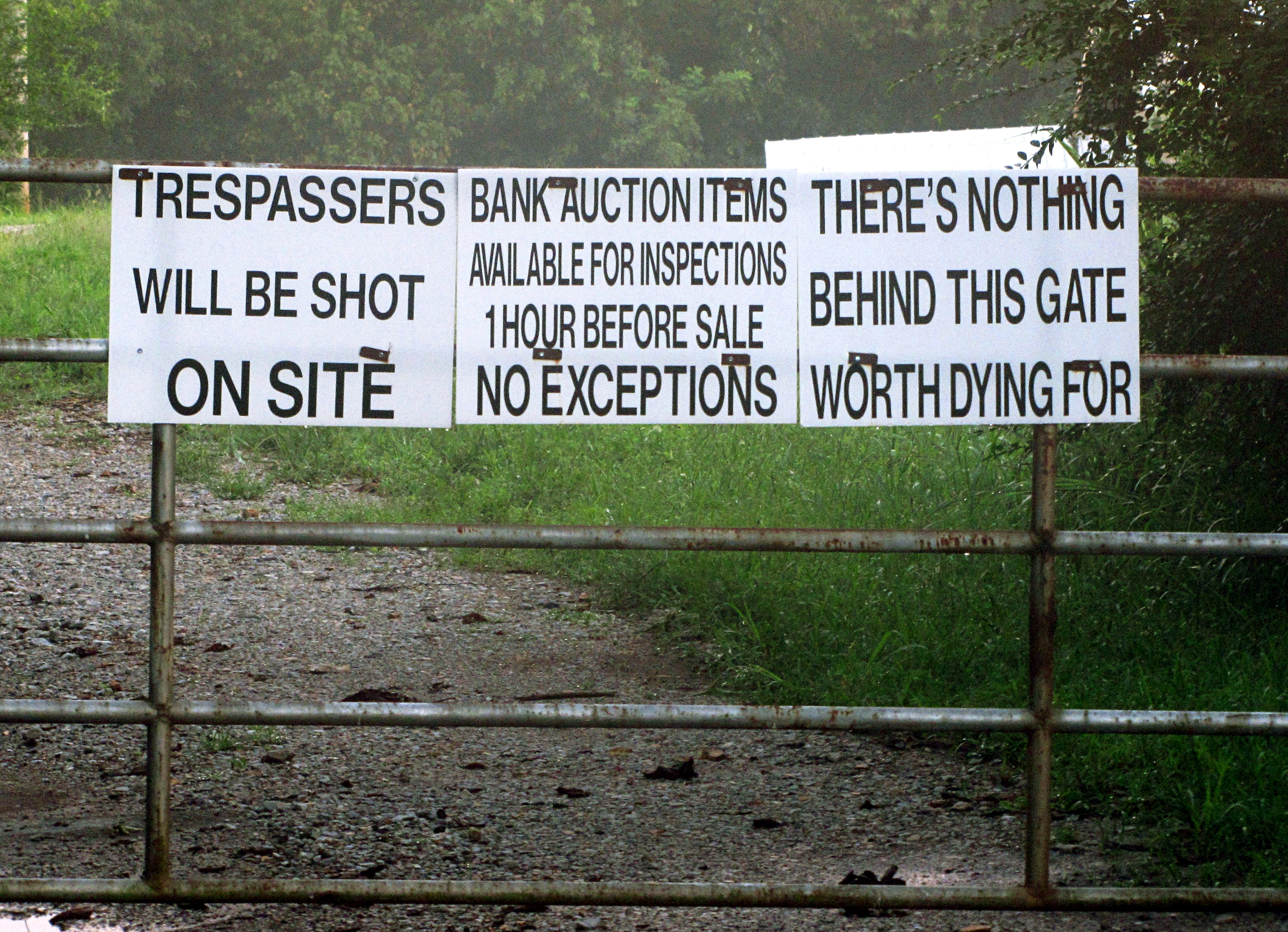
"Trespassers will be shot" sign in Putnam County, Tennessee

In the law of tort, property, and criminal law a trespasser is a person who commits the act of trespassing on a property, that is, without the permission of the owner. Being present on land as a trespasser thereto creates liability in the trespasser, so long as the trespass is intentional. At the same time, the status of a visitor as a trespasser (as opposed to an invitee or a licensee) defines the legal rights of the visitor if they are injured due to the negligence of the property owner.

== Trespassing as a tort ==
The tort of trespass to land requires an intentional physical invasion of the plaintiff's real property by the defendant or a refusal to leave when ordered to leave.

=== Intent required ===
For example, a person walking in a public park who trips and rolls down a hill will not be liable for trespass just because the bottom of the hill is on private land.

=== Physical invasion ===
The trespasser need not enter the land in person. Indeed, if A and B are standing next to C's land, and A pushes B onto the land without entering it himself, it is A (and not B, who did not intend to enter that space) who is liable for the trespass to C's land. There must be some physical entry, however. Causing noise, light, odors, or smoke to enter the land of another is not a trespass, but is instead a different tort, nuisance.

For purposes of determining liability, the landowner's property rights extend above and below the land to as much distance as the landowner can beneficially use. Even a low-flying plane can trespass if it enters this usable space.

=== Constructive trespass ===
A constructive trespass occurs when a person who has permission to be on the land overstays their welcome. A person who stays in a business after its closing time, or who goes to a dinner party but refuses to leave long after the other guests have gone home, is a trespasser despite their initially proper presence. Furthermore, a guest's status as a trespasser arises as soon as they resist when the property owner tells them to leave the property. This is not a constructive trespass if the guest is unconscious.

== Duties owed to trespassers ==
As a broad general rule, property owners owe few duties to trespassers to safeguard them from injuries that may occur on their property.

With respect to the duties owed to trespassers, there are two types of trespassers to consider:

- The undiscovered trespasser, to whom the property owner owes only a duty not to "trap" or wilfully harm the trespasser.
- The anticipated or discovered trespasser. To those parties, the landowner owes a duty of common humanity (See British Railways Board v. Herrington)—a duty to warn them of deadly conditions on the land which would be hidden to them, but of which the property owner is aware.

For injury claims by trespassers, the concept of traps was narrowly defined. More recently, courts in some jurisdictions have engaged in some creativity, adopting a broader interpretation of a trap.

A warning sign at the entrance to the land is generally sufficient to warn trespassers of possible hazards on a property or land. However, a property owner is under no duty to ascertain hazards on his property for the benefit of trespassers, and cannot be held liable for failing to discover a previously unknown hazard that injures a trespasser.

In some jurisdictions an adult trespasser who is injured while on a defendant's property cannot sue under a theory of strict liability, even if the landowner was engaged in ultrahazardous activities, such as the keeping of wild animals, or the use of explosives. Instead, the trespasser must prove that the property owner intentionally or wantonly injured the plaintiff to recover.

Some jurisdictions extend additional protections to children who trespass on the properly of others. For example, if there is a potentially hazardous object or condition on the land that might be attractive to young children, the trespass may be deemed "anticipated" under the doctrine of attractive nuisance such that the child may be able to succeed with an injury claim.

In some regions of the world, a property owner may use reasonable (typically meaning non-deadly) force to prevent a person from trespassing on their land, or to expel a trespasser. However, a property owner may be restricted from expelling a trespasser if doing so would expose the trespasser to a risk of serious injury. For example, a trespasser who takes shelter in a stranger's barn during a powerful storm cannot be expelled until the storm is over.

== United States ==
Many jurisdictions within the United States have passed statutes to modify or clarify the common law duties owed by a property owner to a trespasser (for example, by explicitly permitting the property owner to use reasonable, non-deadly force to expel mere trespassers). The use of deadly force is strictly prohibited for the mere defense of property, and is generally only protected by statutes like the Castle doctrine when a trespasser commits a home invasion and poses an imminent threat of serious bodily harm.

== See also ==
- Castle doctrine
- Duty to retreat
