= List of tort cases =

- Baltimore and Ohio R.R. v. Goodman, 275 U.S. 66 (1927): The duty of due care does not apply in a case of negligence where there are clear legal standards that suggest the plaintiff was responsible.
- Bethel v. New York City Transit Authority, 703 N.E.2d 1214 (1998): Holding that the duty of care owed by common carriers is no longer the same as it was in the 19th century.
- Donoghue v Stevenson: A formative House of Lords case.
- Caparo Industries plc v Dickman: Threefold test for duty of care: whether the damage was reasonably foreseeable; whether there was a relationship of proximity between claimant and defendant; and whether it is just and reasonable to impose a duty. House of Lords case.
- McDonald's coffee case: An American court case that became a cause célèbre for advocates of tort reform. A 79-year-old woman received third degree burns from spilled coffee purchased from the restaurant chain and sued to recover her costs. The coffee that patrons bought at the drive-through, it turns out, was heated to be much hotter than the coffee they served inside was. The jury found the conduct of McDonald's so objectionable that they not only awarded her compensatory damages, but awarded the woman millions of dollars in punitive damages. Many casual observers considered this excessive. The punitive damages were later significantly reduced by a judge on appeal, though this fact is not as widely known as the jury's initial decision.
- Martin v. Herzog: Statutory violations and duty of care.
- Palsgraf v. Long Island Railroad Co.: Landmark case for discussion of proximate cause and its relationship with duty. Court of Appeals of New York. 248 N.Y. 339, 162 N.E. 99. (1928)
- Pokura v. Wabash Ry. Co., 292 U.S. 98 (1934): Plaintiffs' negligence is determined by the facts and a reasonable person standard.
- Rylands v Fletcher: Early leading case on strict liability doctrine. (Exchequer Chamber, 1866) L.R. 1. Ex. 265.
- Tarasoff v. Regents of the University of California, 551 P.2d 334 (Cal. 1976): A case in which a patient told his psychiatrist that he had thoughts of killing a girl. Later he did kill the girl. A leading case in defining the standard of the duty of care, and the duty to warn.
- Trimarco v. Klein, Ct. of App. of N.Y., 56 N.Y.2d 98, 436 N.E.2d 502 (1982): Custom and usage are merely part of the reasonable person standard.
- United States v. Carroll Towing Co.: In his opinion, Judge Learned Hand gave his famous formula for determining the appropriate standard of care to be expected in given circumstances. P = probability of mishap, L = loss that would result from such a mishap, and B = the burden of adequate safeguards against the possible mishap. In Judge Hand's formulation, liability depends upon whether B is less than L multiplied by P (viz., whether B < P*L). U.S. Court of Appeals, 2nd Circuit. 159 F.2d 169.
- Vaughan v Menlove, 132 Eng. Rep.490 (C.P. 1837): An important case in the definition of a reasonable person standard in which a man negligently stacks hay that catches fire.
- Kasturilal Ralia Ram v. The State of Uttar Pradesh 1965 AIR 1039; 1965 SCR (1) 375: A landmark case on Constitution of India, 1950, Art. 300(1) - State Liability for tortious acts of its servants.
- Diaz v. Tesla, Inc.: 137 million dollars in damages to a Tesla, Inc. employee who faced racial harassment.
