= United States tort law =

This article addresses torts in United States law. As such, it covers primarily common law. Moreover, it provides general rules, as individual states all have separate civil codes. There are three general categories of torts: intentional torts, negligence, and strict liability torts.

== Intentional torts ==
Intentional torts involve situations in which the defendant desires or knows to a substantial certainty that his act will cause the plaintiff damage. They include battery, assault, false imprisonment, intentional infliction of emotional distress ("IIED"), trespass to land, trespass to chattels, conversion, invasion of privacy, malicious prosecution, abuse of process, fraud, inducing breach of contract, intentional interference with business relations, and defamation of character (libel/slander).

=== Elements ===
The elements of most intentional torts follow the same pattern: intent, act, result, and causation.

==== Intent ====
This element typically requires the defendant to desire or know to a substantial certainty that something will occur as a result of his act. Therefore, the term intent, for purposes of this section, always includes either desire or knowledge to a substantial certainty.

For an example in battery, Dave shoots a gun into a crowd of people because he is specifically trying to hit someone with a bullet. This element would be satisfied, as David had an actual desire to procure the harm required for this tort. Alternatively, Dave shoots a gun into a crowd of people for some reason and genuinely hopes no one gets hit but knows that it is virtually inevitable that someone will actually get hit. This element would still be satisfied, as David had knowledge to a substantial certainty that harm would result.

In contrast, if all that can be said about the defendant's state of mind is that he should have known better, he will not be liable for an intentional tort. This situation might occur if, as opposed to the examples above, Dave shoots a gun in a remote part of the desert without looking just for fun, not wanting to hit anyone, but the bullet does hit someone. Dave did not have a desire or knowledge to a substantial certainty that someone would get hit in this situation. He may, however, be liable for some other tort, namely negligence.

===== Transferred intent =====
Transferred intent is the legal principle that intent can be transferred from one victim or tort to another. [1] In tort law, there are generally five areas in which transferred intent is applicable: battery, assault, false imprisonment, trespass to land, and trespass to chattels. Generally, any intent to cause any one of these five torts which results in the completion of any of the five tortious acts will be considered an intentional act, even if the actual target of the tort is one other than the intended target of the original tort.

==== Act ====
The element of an act varies by whatever tort is in question but always requires voluntariness. For example, if Dave has a muscle spasm that makes his arm fling out to his side and hit Paula, who is standing next to him, any case that Paula attempts to bring against Dave for battery will fail for lack of the requisite act (which will be discussed in the section on battery, below). The act was not voluntary.

==== Result ====
This element typically refers to damage, although damage is not required to prevail on certain intentional torts, such as trespass to land.

==== Causation ====
This element refers to actual cause and proximate cause. It will be treated in its own section.

=== Causes of action ===
==== Battery ====
A person commits a battery when he acts either intending to cause a harmful or offensive contact with another or intending to cause another imminent apprehension of such contact and when such contact results. Therefore, there is a variety of ways in which a person can commit a battery, as illustrated by the following examples of defendant Dave and plaintiff Paula.

- Dave acts intending to cause a harmful contact with Paula, and a harmful contact does result.
- Dave acts intending to cause a harmful contact with Paula, but an offensive contact results.
- Dave acts intending to cause an offensive contact with Paula, and an offensive contact does result.
- Dave acts intending to cause an offensive contact with Paula, but a harmful contact results.
- Dave acts intending to "only" cause Paula to be imminently apprehensive of a harmful or offensive contact, but a harmful contact actually results.
- Dave acts intending to "only" cause Paula to be imminently apprehensive of a harmful or offensive contact, but an offensive contact actually results.

Apprehension is a broader term than fear. If a defendant intends to cause the plaintiff to actually fear a harmful contact, for example, it will therefore always suffice as apprehension, but there are other ways to achieve apprehension as well.

==== Assault ====
Assault is notably similar to battery. Indeed, the elements of intent and act are identical. The only difference is the result. A person commits an assault when he acts either intending to cause a harmful or offensive contact with another or intending to cause another imminent apprehension of such contact and when such imminent apprehension results. Therefore, there is a variety of ways in which a person can commit an assault.

==== False imprisonment ====
A person commits false imprisonment when he acts intending to confine another and when confinement actually results that the confine is either aware of or damaged by.

Confinement must typically be within boundaries that the defendant establishes. For example, a person is not confined when he is refused entry to a building, because he is free to leave. In addition, a person is not confined unless the will to leave of an ordinary person in the same situation would be overborne. For example, Dave calls Paula into a room with one door. Dave closes the door and stands in front of it. He tells Paula that if she wants to leave, he will open the door and get out of her way but also threatens to blink twice if she does so. An ordinary person's will to leave would not be overborne by Dave's threat to blink twice.

No damage is required in false imprisonment, hence the requirement of a result of awareness or damage. For example, Dave calls Paula into a room with one door. Dave closes the door and stands in front of it. He tells Paula that if she wants to leave, he will take out a gun and shoot her. (Note that this would overcome the will of an ordinary person to leave.) An hour later, Dave changes his mind and leaves the premises. Paula subsequently leaves and is not physically injured at all. Her awareness of confinement is sufficient to satisfy the element of the result in false imprisonment.

Alternatively, Paula is a narcoleptic. She suddenly falls into a deep sleep while feeding the chickens in a barn on Dave's farm in a remote area. Not wanting to move her, Dave locks her in the barn from the outside when he needs to go into town, trying to protect her but also knowing that she won't be able to leave (or call for help) if she wakes up. While Dave is away, the chickens severely scratch Paula's arms, but she does not wake up. Dave returns, unlocks the barn, and successfully wakes up Paula to tend to her wounds. Even though she was unaware of her confinement, she was damaged by it and will have a claim of false imprisonment against Dave.

==== Intentional infliction of emotional distress ====
A person is liable for intentional infliction of emotional distress (IIED) when he intentionally or recklessly engages in extreme and outrageous conduct that is highly likely to cause severe emotional distress.

This is a notable exception to the general rule given above that for almost all intentional torts only desire or knowledge to a substantial certainty will do. IIED also includes recklessness. This still distinguishes it from negligent infliction of emotional distress, though.

Extreme and outrageous conduct refers to the act. Severe emotional distress refers to the result. This is another intentional tort for which no damage is ordinarily required. However, some jurisdictions require the accompaniment of physical effects. In other words, emotional distress will not be deemed to exist in those jurisdictions unless there are physical manifestations, such as vomiting or fainting.

==== Trespass to land ====
A person commits trespass to land when he wrongfully and intentionally enters, or causes a thing or third person to enter, land owned or occupied by another.

==== Trespass to chattel ====
A person commits trespass to chattel when he acts either intending to dispossess the rightful possessor of a chattel or intending to use or intermeddle with the chattel of another and when dispossession of the chattel for a substantial time results, or damage to the chattel results, or physical injury to the rightful possessor results.

==== Conversion ====
A person commits conversion when he acts intending to exercise dominion and control and when interference with the rightful possessor's control results that is so serious that it requires the actor to pay the full value of the chattel to the rightful possessor. An exercise of dominion and control refers to the act. Serious interference refers to the result. Seriousness is determined by the following factors:

- the nature of the act and how long it lasted;
- the nature of the interference and how long it lasted;
- the inconvenience to and expense incurred by the rightful possessor;
- the actor's good faith (whether he was trying to help someone, for example);
- when applicable, the mistake by the actor (he took a book that looked just like his own but was actually someone else's, for example); and
- when applicable, the damage to the chattel.

The remedy for this cause of action not only requires the defendant to pay the plaintiff the full value of the chattel but also is properly considered a forced sale. The plaintiff must tender the defendant the chattel. Therefore, a plaintiff may not elect to pursue this cause of action but instead trespass to chattel, namely when he wants to keep his chattel despite its potential damage.

==== Defamation ====
- Barrett v. Rosenthal
- Curtis Publishing Co. v. Butts
- Dun & Bradstreet, Inc. v. Greenmoss Builders, Inc.
- Gertz v. Robert Welch, Inc.
- Hustler Magazine v. Falwell
- Lunney v. Prodigy Services Co.
- McDonald v. Smith
- Milkovich v. Lorain Journal Co.
- Near v. Minnesota
- New York Times Co. v. Sullivan
- Red Lion Broadcasting Co. v. Federal Communications Commission
- Reynolds v. Pegler
- Time, Inc. v. Firestone
- Westmoreland v. CBS
- John Peter Zenger

=== Affirmative defenses ===
The following are affirmative defenses to intentional torts.

==== Consent ====
Consent can be a defense to any intentional tort, although lack of consent is occasionally incorporated into the definition of an intentional tort, such as trespass to land. However, lack of consent is not always an essential element to establish a prima facie case in such situations. Therefore, it is properly treated as an affirmative defense.

==== Self-defense ====
Self-defense is typically a defense to battery. Similar to self-defense is the defense of others.

==== Defense of property ====
This is typically a defense to trespass to land or trespass to chattels, as it can refer to realty or personalty.

==== Necessity ====
Necessity is typically a defense to trespass to land. There are two kinds of necessity, private and public.

===== Private necessity =====
This is a partial privilege. A party who has this privilege is still liable for damage caused. This defense is therefore more important when there is a concomitant issue of whether the opposing party has a valid privilege of defense of property.

The following example is derived from an actual Vermont case from 1908 called Ploof v. Putnam. Paula is sailing on a lake when a violent storm suddenly breaks out. She navigates to the nearest dock and quickly ties up her vessel, not damaging the dock at all. The dock belongs to Dave. Dave attempts to exercise the privilege of defense of property, as Paula would ordinarily be committing a trespass to land in this situation, and unties the vessel. Paula therefore drifts back away from the shore. Her boat is damaged, and she suffers personal injuries, both as a result of the storm.

If Paula had damaged Dave's dock, she would be liable for it, even though she has a valid privilege of private necessity. More importantly, Dave is now liable to Paula for the damage to her boat and for her personal injuries. Because of the private necessity, Paula is not considered a trespasser. So, Dave did not in fact have a valid privilege of defense of property.

Ordinarily, for private necessity to be valid, the party attempting to exercise it must not have created the emergency. For example, if Paula intentionally punctures her fuel tank just so she can race over to Dave's dock and tie up, she will not have a valid privilege of private necessity. As such, she would be a trespasser, and Dave would have a valid privilege of defense of property.

===== Public necessity =====
This is a complete privilege. A party who has this privilege, typically a public official or governmental entity, is not liable for any damage caused. A famous early case on this privilege involved John W. Geary, the first mayor of San Francisco, who made the decision during a major fire to burn down several private residences to establish a fire break.

== Negligence ==
Amongst unintentional torts one finds negligence as being the most common source of common law. Most Americans are under the impression that most people can sue for any type of negligence, but it is untrue in most US jurisdictions (partly because negligence is one of the few torts for which ordinary people can and do obtain liability insurance.) It is a form of extracontractual liability that is based upon a failure to comply with the duty of care of a reasonable person, which failure is the actual cause and proximate cause of damages. That is, but for the tortfeasor's act or omission, the damages to the plaintiff would not have been incurred, and the damages were a reasonably foreseeable consequence of the tortious conduct.

Some jurisdictions recognize one or more designations less than actual intentional wrongdoing, but more egregious than mere negligence, such as "wanton", "reckless" or "despicable" conduct. A finding in those states that a defendant's conduct was "wanton," "reckless" or "despicable", rather than merely negligent, can be significant because certain defenses, such as contributory negligence, are often unavailable when such conduct is the cause of the damages.

=== Professional rescuer ===
- MacPherson v. Buick Motor Co., 217 N.Y. 382, 111 N.E. 1050 (1916) Judge Benjamin N. Cardozo which removed the requirement of privity of contract for duty in negligence actions.
- Martin v. Herzog, 228 N Y. 164, 126 N.E. 814 (1920)
- Tedla v. Ellman, 280 N.Y. 124, 19 N.E.2d 987, (1939) on negligence per se, or the violation of a duty under a statute
- Seong Sil Kim v. New York City Transit Authority, duty of care to a person who may have been attempting suicide.

=== Breach of duty ===
Breach is ordinarily established by showing that the defendant failed to exercise reasonable care. Some courts use the terms ordinary care or prudent care instead. Conduct is typically considered to be unreasonable when the disadvantages outweigh the advantages. Judge Learned Hand famously reduced this to algebraic form in United States v. Carroll Towing Co.: Where $B<PL$ which means that if the burden of exercising more care is less than the probability of damage or harm multiplied by the severity of the expected loss, and a person fails to undertake the burden, he is not exercising reasonable care and is thus breaching his duty to do so (assuming he has one). In other words, the burden of prevention is less than the probability that the injury will occur multiplied by the gravity of the harm/injury. Under this formula, duty changes as circumstances change—if the cost of prevention increases, then the duty to prevent decreases; if the likelihood of damage or the severity of the potential damage increases, then duty to prevent increases.

There are other ways of establishing breach, as well.

- United States v. Carroll Towing Co., 159 F.2d 169 (2d. Cir. 1947)

==== Violation of statute ====
This is also known as negligence per se. An incident would not have happened if there was not a breach. Breach can be shown in most jurisdictions if a defendant violates a statute that pertains to safety and the purpose of which is to prevent the result of the case. Note that this is an alternative way to show breach. A violation of statute will not have occurred in every case. Therefore, just because it cannot be shown does not mean that there has been no breach. Even if it is attempted to be shown but fails, there may be other bases of breach.

===== Excuse =====
Occasionally, there is a valid excuse for violating a safety statute, namely when it is safer or arguably safer to violate than to comply with it. This happened in Tedla v. Ellman. A statute required pedestrians using roadways to walk against traffic. At the time in question, there was heavy traffic going the opposite direction as the plaintiff. Therefore, the plaintiff would have had to walk past many more vehicles, arguably increasing his chances of being hit. So, the plaintiff walked with traffic on the other side of the road, thus violating the statute. There were far fewer vehicles travelling that direction, but the plaintiff was hit anyway. Even though the purpose of the statute was to prevent precisely the result that occurred, the plaintiff nonetheless prevailed because of a valid excuse for violating the statute, namely that it was probably safer not to comply.

==== Violation of custom ====
Breach can be shown in most jurisdictions if a defendant violates a custom that is widespread and itself reasonable. For example, where ten percent of a certain industry does a certain thing, it probably will not be considered a custom for purposes of breach in negligence. Alternatively, if 90 percent of a certain industry does a certain thing, but the thing is inherently unsafe, and it is upholding the custom as a cost-saving measure, violation of that custom (doing something safer) will not constitute breach. As with violation of statute, this is an alternative way to show breach. Therefore, just because it cannot be shown, or is attempted to be shown but fails, does not mean that there has been no breach. There may be other ways of showing breach.

- Trimarco v. Klein, 56 N.Y.2d 98, 436 N.E.2d 502 (1982), decided that customary conduct is not conclusive (although it is good evidence) of what will be reasonable.

==== Res ipsa loquitur ====
This is a Latin phrase that means "the thing speaks for itself." It is a rare alternative basis of breach. Ordinarily, it only applies when the plaintiff has little or limited access to the evidence of negligent conduct. Res ipsa loquitur requires that the defendant have exclusive control over the thing that causes the injury and that the act be one that would not ordinarily occur without negligence. Likely defendant negligence was responsible and plaintiff was not cause.

== Causation ==
Causation is typically a bigger issue in negligence cases than intentional torts. However, as mentioned previously, it is an element of any tort. The defendant's act must be an actual cause and a proximate cause of the result in a particular cause of action.

=== Actual cause ===
Actual cause has historically been determined by the "but for" test. If the result would not have occurred but for the defendant's act, the act is an actual cause of the result.

Several other tests have been created to supplement this general rule, however, especially to deal with cases in which the plaintiff suffers great harm, yet because multiple acts by multiple defendants, the but for test is unhelpful. This situation occurred in the famous case of Summers v. Tice. For example, Dan and Dave both negligently fire their shotguns at Paula. Paula is struck by only one pellet and it is impossible to determine which gun it was fired from. Using the but for test alone, Dan and Dave can both escape liability. Dan can say that but for his own negligence, Paula still might have suffered the same harm. Dave can make the same argument. As a matter of public policy, most courts will nonetheless hold Dan and Dave jointly and severally liable. The act of each defendant is therefore said to be an actual cause, even if this is a fiction.

A similar situation arises when it is impossible to show that the defendant(s) was/were negligent at all. This almost inevitably arises in cases also involving res ipsa loquitor. See Ybarra v. Spangard. For example, making the facts of that case more extreme, Paula goes to the hospital for an appendectomy. She wakes up, and finds her left arm has also been amputated for no apparent reason. (Note that this would implicate multiple issues and other causes of action than negligence.) For purposes of actual cause, unless there is evidence or an admission of negligent conduct, Paula will be unable to show an actual cause. In this situation too, most courts will hold all the defendants that Paula names (possibly everyone on the medical staff that was in the room during her surgery) jointly and severally liable. The act of each defendant is likewise said to be an actual cause, even if this is a fiction.

==== Substantial factor test ====
Another test deals with cases in which there are two actual causes but only one is negligent. For example, there are three equidistant points, A, B, and C. Paula's house is at point A. Dave negligently ignites a fire at point B. Lightning simultaneously strikes point C, starting a second fire. The fire at point B and the fire at point C both burn towards point A. Paula's house burns down. Unlike Summers v. Tice, there is only one defendant in this situation. Most courts will still hold Dave's negligence to be an actual cause, as his conduct was a substantial factor in causing Paula's damage. This is sometimes called the substantial factor test.

- Summers v. Tice, 33 Cal. 2d 80 (1948)
- Ybarra v. Spangard, 25 Cal. 2d 486 (1944)

=== Proximate cause ===
There are many tests for determining whether an actual cause is a proximate one. Most involve some form of foreseeability.

Justice Cardozo has two factors to determine if there was a proximate cause between the plaintiff's injury and the defendant's breach of duty:

1. Is the plaintiff's injury a reasonably foreseeable consequence of the defendant's breach of duty?
2. Is the plaintiff a reasonably foreseeable victim of the defendant's breach of duty?

Justice Andrews has several factors to determine if there was a proximate cause between the plaintiff's injury and the defendant's breach of duty:

1. Was there a natural and continuous sequence between the plaintiff's injury and the defendant's breach of duty?
2. Was the injury caused directly or indirectly?
3. Based on human experience, would people expect the result to happen?
4. Was the result too remote in time and/or place in light of the circumstances?
5. Were there intervening causes? Were the intervening causes ones people would expect or were they so unusual (i.e., superseding causes) as to break the chain of causation?
- Ultramares Corporation v. Touche, 174 N.E. 441 (1931), on proximate cause in negligent misstatement cases

== Other causes of action ==
=== Negligent infliction of emotional distress ===
- Miller v. National Broadcasting Co. 232 Cal. Rptr 688 (1986)
- Dillon v. Legg, '68 Cal. 2d 728 (1968)
- Thing v. LaChusa 48 Cal. 3d 644, 666-667 (1989).

=== Medical malpractice ===
- Ewing v. Goldstein
- Tarasoff v. Regents of the University of California
- Schloendorff v. Society of New York Hospital, 211 N.Y. 125, 105 N.E. 92 (1914), the principle of informed consent before operations
- Jablonski by Pahls v. United States, 712 F.2d 391 (9th Cir. 1983)

=== Interspousal Tort Suits ===
Historically at common law, spouses were not allowed to sue one another at all. Initially, this was due to the doctrine of coverture. Even after this legal doctrine was abandoned with the adoption of the Married Women's Property Acts, many courts disallowed lawsuits between spouses other than divorce or criminal proceedings for the fear that it would disrupt marital harmony.

From the 1860s until 1913, courts completely rejected the notion of interspousal liability. Then, in 1914, one woman was allowed to bring a civil suit against her husband for assault and false imprisonment. Between 1914 and 1920, there were seven state supreme courts that allowed spouses to sue one another for claims such as assault and battery, wrongful imprisonment, wrongful death, and infliction of venereal disease. However, recognition of spouses' ability to sue one another stalled around 1921. Scholars suggest this change in direction is due to the rise of tort suits arising out of automobile accidents. Courts declined to extend spouses the ability to sue each another after car accidents for fear of collusion and insurance fraud. This fear stems from the fact that both sides of a negligent car accident suit between spouses want the injured party to recover. Courts then blurred the lines between willful and negligent tort suits to disallow any interspousal tort suits. This argument contrasts the popular narrative that patriarchal restrictions were responsible for interspousal immunity from suit.

== Public authorities ==
- Dolan v. United States Postal Service, post office immune under the Federal Tort Claims Act
- Feres v. United States, 340 U.S. 135 (1950), US immune from suit from members of the military
- Warren v. District of Columbia, 444 A.2d. 1, D.C. Ct. of Ap. (1981) holding that the police were not responsible for failing (though repeatedly warned) to respond to calls and arrest people committing crimes

== Damages ==
Joint liability

- Walt Disney World Co. v. Wood, 489 So. 2d 61 (Fla. Dist. Ct. App. 1986)

Comparative negligence

- Li v. Yellow Cab Co., 532 P.2d 1226, 13 Cal.3d 804 (1975),

Punitive damages

Punitive damages (sums intended to punish the defendant) may be awarded in addition to actual damages intended to compensate the plaintiff. Punitive damage awards generally require a higher showing than mere negligence, but lower than intention. For instance, grossly negligent, reckless, or outrageous conduct may be grounds for an award of punitive damages. These punitive damages awards can be quite substantial in some cases.

- BMW of North America, Inc. v. Gore, Constitutional limits on punitive damages
- Liebeck v. McDonald's Restaurants
- Pearson v. Chung (2005)

== Strict liability ==
Strict liability torts are brought for injuries resulting from ultrahazardous activities, for which the defendant will be held liable even if there was no negligence on his/her part. Strict liability also applies to some types of product liability claims and to copyright infringement and some trademark cases. Some statutory torts are also strict liability, including many environmental torts. The term "strict liability" refers to the fact that the tortfeasor's liability is not premised on their culpable state of mind (whether they knew or intended to accomplish the wrongful act, or violated a standard of care by doing so,) but, instead, strictly on the conduct itself or its result.

=== Product liability ===
Product liability refers to the liability of manufacturers, wholesalers and retailers for unreasonably dangerous products.

- Escola v. Coca-Cola Bottling Co., 24 Cal.2d 453, 150 P.2d 436 (1944)
- Sindell v. Abbott Laboratories, 26 Cal. 3d 588, 607 P.2d 924 (1980)

== Federal torts ==
Although federal courts often hear tort cases arising out of common law or state statutes, there are relatively few tort claims that arise exclusively as a result of federal law. The most common federal tort claim is the 42 U.S.C. § 1983 remedy for violation of one's civil rights under color of federal or state law, which can be used to sue for anything from a free speech claim to use of excessive force by the police. Tort claims arising out of injuries occurring on vessels on navigable waters of the United States fall under federal admiralty jurisdiction.

== See also ==
- United States contract law
- Civil Procedure in the United States
- Restatement of Torts, Second
- Tort reform in the United States
- Privacy laws of the United States
