= Standard of care =

Tort law doctrine

In tort law, the standard of care is the only degree of prudence and caution required of an individual who is under a duty of care.

The requirements of the standard are closely dependent on circumstances. Whether the standard of care has been breached is determined by the trier of fact, and is usually phrased in terms of the reasonable person; this is sometimes labeled as the "reasonable physician standard". It was famously described in Vaughan v. Menlove (1837) as whether the individual "proceed[ed] with such reasonable caution as a prudent man would have exercised under such circumstances".

== Professional standard of care ==
In certain industries and professions, the standard of care is determined by the standard that would be exercised by the reasonably prudent manufacturer of a product, or the reasonably prudent professional in that line of work. Such a test (known as the "Bolam Test") was used to determine whether a doctor was liable for medical malpractice before the 2015 UK Supreme Court decision of Montgomery v Lanarkshire Health Board which introduced further responsibilities on the doctor, echoed in similar judgements in other jurisdictions. The standard of care is important because it can determine the level of negligence required to state a valid cause of action. In the business world the standard of care taken can be described as Due Diligence or performing a Channel Check.

== Medical standard of care ==
A standard of care is a medical or psychological treatment guideline, and can be general or specific. It specifies appropriate treatment based on scientific evidence and collaboration between medical and/or psychological professionals involved in the treatment of a given condition.

Some common examples:

1. Diagnostic and treatment process that a clinician should follow for a certain type of patient, illness, or clinical circumstance. Adjuvant chemotherapy for lung cancer is "a new standard of care, but not necessarily the only standard of care". (New England Journal of Medicine, 2004)

2. In legal terms, the level at which an ordinary, prudent professional with the same training and experience in good standing in a same or similar community would practice under the same or similar circumstances. An "average" standard would not apply because in that case at least half of any group of practitioners would not qualify. The medical malpractice plaintiff must establish the appropriate standard of care and demonstrate that the standard of care has been breached, with expert testimony.

3. A physician also has a "duty to inform" a patient of any material risks or fiduciary interests of the physician that might cause the patient to reconsider a procedure, and may be liable if injury occurs due to the undisclosed risk, and the patient can prove that if he had been informed he would not have gone through with the procedure, without benefit of hindsight. (Informed Consent Rule.) Full disclosure of all material risks incident to treatment must be fully disclosed, unless doing so would impair urgent treatment. As it relates to mental health professionals standard of care, the California Supreme Court, held that these professionals have "duty to protect" individuals who are specifically threatened by a patient. [Tarasoff v. Regents of the University of California, 17 Cal. 3d 425, 551 P.2d 334, 131 Cal. Rptr. 14 (Cal. 1976)].

4. A recipient of pro bono (free) services (either legal or medical) is entitled to expect the same standard of care as a person who pays for the same services, to prevent an indigent person from being entitled to only substandard care.

Medical standards of care exist for many conditions, including diabetes, some cancers, and sexual abuse.

Failure to provide patients treatment that meets a standard of care can incur legal liability for any injury or death that results. In large-scale disasters, public authorities may declare crisis standards of care apply. This allows overwhelmed medical personnel to triage patients, directing resources toward patients they think need it the most, by giving other patients less than the normal standard of care. For example, this occurred during the COVID-19 pandemic in Arizona.

== Children ==
A special standard of care also applies to children, who, in a majority of jurisdictions, are held to the behavior that is reasonable for a child of similar age, experience, and intelligence under like circumstances. (Restatement (Second) of Torts §283A; Cleveland Rolling-Mill Co. v. Corrigan, 46 Ohio St. 283, 20 N.E. 466 (1889).) In some cases it means that more may be required of a child of superior intelligence. (Compare Jones v. Fireman's Insurance Co. of Newark, New Jersey, 240 So.2d 780 [La.App. 1970] with Robinson v. Travis, 393 So.2d 304 (La.App. 1980). An exception is for children engaged in "adult activity." Dellwo v. Pearson, 107 N.W.2d 859 (Minn 1961) Nicholsen v. Brown, 232 Or. 426, 374 P.2d 896 (1962) (automobile); Daniels v. Evans, 102 N.H. 407, 224 A. 2d 63 (1966) (motor scooter); Neumann. v. Shlansky, 58 Misc. 2d 128, 294 N.Y.S.2d 628 (1968 (playing golf)) What constitutes an "adult standard" may depend on local statute, and some have arbitrary age distinctions. Another exception is if the child is engaged in an "inherently dangerous activity." It is up to the trier of fact to decide if the activity is inherently dangerous. If they find that it is, the child must be held to an adult standard of care. Robinson v. Lindsay, 92 Wash.2d 410, 598 P.2d 2392 (1979) (snowmobile);

== Persons with disabilities ==
A person with a disability is held to the same standard of care that an ordinary reasonable person would observe if they had that same disability. (Roberts v. State of Louisiana, 396 So.2d 566 (1981) (blind postal employee)) However, courts do not recognize a person with a mental disability to be subject to any such special standard, and are held to the "reasonable prudent person" standard, except when the onset of mental illness is unforeseeable and sudden (e.g., Breunig v. American Family Insurance Co., 45 Wis.2d 536, 173 N.W.2d 619 (1970) (sudden hallucinations while driving).) In some situations, this could work an injustice. Physical disabilities and conditions, such as blindness, deafness, short stature, or a club foot, or the weaknesses of age or sex, are treated merely as part of the "circumstances" under which a reasonable man must act.

== Duty to inform self of responsibilities ==
A person engaged in a special and potentially dangerous activity must know or inquire of possible hazards or of any special duties and responsibilities inherent in that activity that might affect their ability to exercise reasonable prudent caution (cf, Delair v. McAdoo, 324 Pa. 392, 188 A. 181 (1936) (driving on worn tires).) Custom and practice of usage may be useful evidence for determining the usual standard, but not determinative of what a reasonable prudent person ought to be required to do or know (cf., Trimarco v. Klein, 58 N.Y. 2d 98 (1982) (showerdoor glass).) As Justice Holmes classic statement expresses it, "What usually is done may be evidence of what ought to be done, but what ought to be done is fixed by a standard of reasonable prudence, whether it is complied with or not."

== Person of below average intelligence ==
A person of substandard intelligence is held under common law to the same standard of a reasonable prudent person, to encourage them to exert a decreased effort of responsibility to their community, in light of their handicap, and as a result of the practical difficulty of proving what reduced standard should apply (Vaughn v. Menlove, 3 Bing. (N.C.) 468, 432 Eng.Rep.490 (1837).) Restatement (Second) of Torts, § 289 cmt. n (noting that the "reasonable person" standard makes allowances for age and physical disability but not "attention, perception, memory, knowledge of other pertinent matters, intelligence, and judgment. Oliver Wendell Holmes, The Common Law, 108 (Little, Brown, & Co. 1881): "The standards of the law are standards of general application. The law takes no account of the infinite varieties of temperament, intellect, and education which make the internal character of a given act so different in different men."

== Attorney ==
An attorney is held to the standard that any reasonable attorney in possession of the same knowledge and skill that an ordinary member of his or her profession possesses, as long as he is acting with reasonable care and diligence, in good faith and honest belief that his advice and acts are well founded at the time. Here, mere errors in judgment are excusable (Best Judgment Rule) and cannot be judged solely with the gift of hindsight without substantial injustice. He or she is required to exercise ordinary care and caution (diligence) in the use of that skill (Due Care Rule), and procedural and technical failures are held to be the most common breaches. (cf, Hodges v. Carter, 239 N.C. 517, 80 S.E.2d 144 (1954). (failed service of process).)

== Person subjected to unexpected danger ==
In Cordas v. Peerless Taxi Company, 27 N.Y.S.2d 198 (1941), Justice Carlin held that a taxicab driver hijacked at gunpoint by a fleeing mugger in New York City may be excused from negligence for jumping out of the moving taxicab to save his own life, leaving the cab on an unguided trajectory towards bystanders. While some persons might choose to be singularly heroic, that standard is not one that is required for an ordinary prudent person. Such a person is held excused from liability, even if such failure might endanger others. An ordinary prudent person is not under any obligation to undertake a heroic duty at the risk of his own life. "The first duty in an emergency is to one's own self, as long as that person did not contribute to or cause the emergency." (Emergency Doctrine.)

== Negligence per se ==
When a statute, which is designed to protect the public, is violated while performing an allegedly negligent act, a court may adopt the statute as establishing the standard of care for tort liability. This is negligence per se. There is no negligence per se doctrine in federal law.

Four elements are deemed necessary for a statute to apply in a negligence case. First the person harmed must be a member of the class of persons which the law was intended to protect. Second, the danger or harm must be one that the law was intended to prevent. Thirdly, there must be some causal relationship established between the breach of the statute and the harm caused. Fourthly, the criminal statute must be concrete, specific and measurable enough to clearly establish a standard of breach. Courts are reluctant to create new torts out of criminal statutes. (See Restatement (Second) of Torts, sections 297, 288.)

However, there are five valid excuses that are available for a defendant to defeat a standard of negligence per se. (Restatement (Second) of Torts section 288.1(2).) First, the defendant may not know of the breach due to incompetence. Secondly, he might either lack knowledge or reason to know of the breach or duty. Furthermore, for some explainable reason, he may be unable to comply, despite diligence. The breach may be due to a sudden emergency not of one's own making. And lastly, in special situations it may be safer to not comply than to comply. In cases where these defenses are applied, negligence per se doctrine creates no more than a rebuttable presumption of negligence that shifts the burden of proof from the plaintiff to the defendant.

== Reasonable person/ordinary care ==
In balancing risks to establish a reasonable person's standard of ordinary care, the calculus of negligence establishes that the probability of the harm potentially caused (P) must be balanced along with the gravity of the harm which could result (G), against the burden of conforming to a new and less dangerous course of action (B) along with the utility of maintaining the same course of action as it was (U). This is sometimes noted in shorthand as P+G v. B+U, deriving from a formulation expressed by Judge Learned Hand. (United States v. Carroll Towing Co., 159 F.2d 169 (1947).)

== Common Carrier or Innkeeper Standard of Care ==
In the Hospitality industries, the standard of care is higher, as the Innkeeper is expected to seek out potential danger and prevent it. " Innkeeper/Common Carrier - very high degree of care - liable for slight negligence"

== See also ==
- National Care Standards (Scotland)
- Care Standards Act 2000
- Standard of care in English law
- General Social Care Council
- Duty of care
- Reasonable person
- Bonus pater familias
