= SCMA =

SCMA may refer to:

- ICAO code of the Puerto Marín Balmaceda Airport
- Scottish Childminding Association
- South Carolina Military Academy
- Southern California Military Academy
- Sport Clube Mineiro Aljustrelense
- SubCarrier Multiple Access
- Smith College Museum of Art
