= Pub test =

Standard in Australian politics

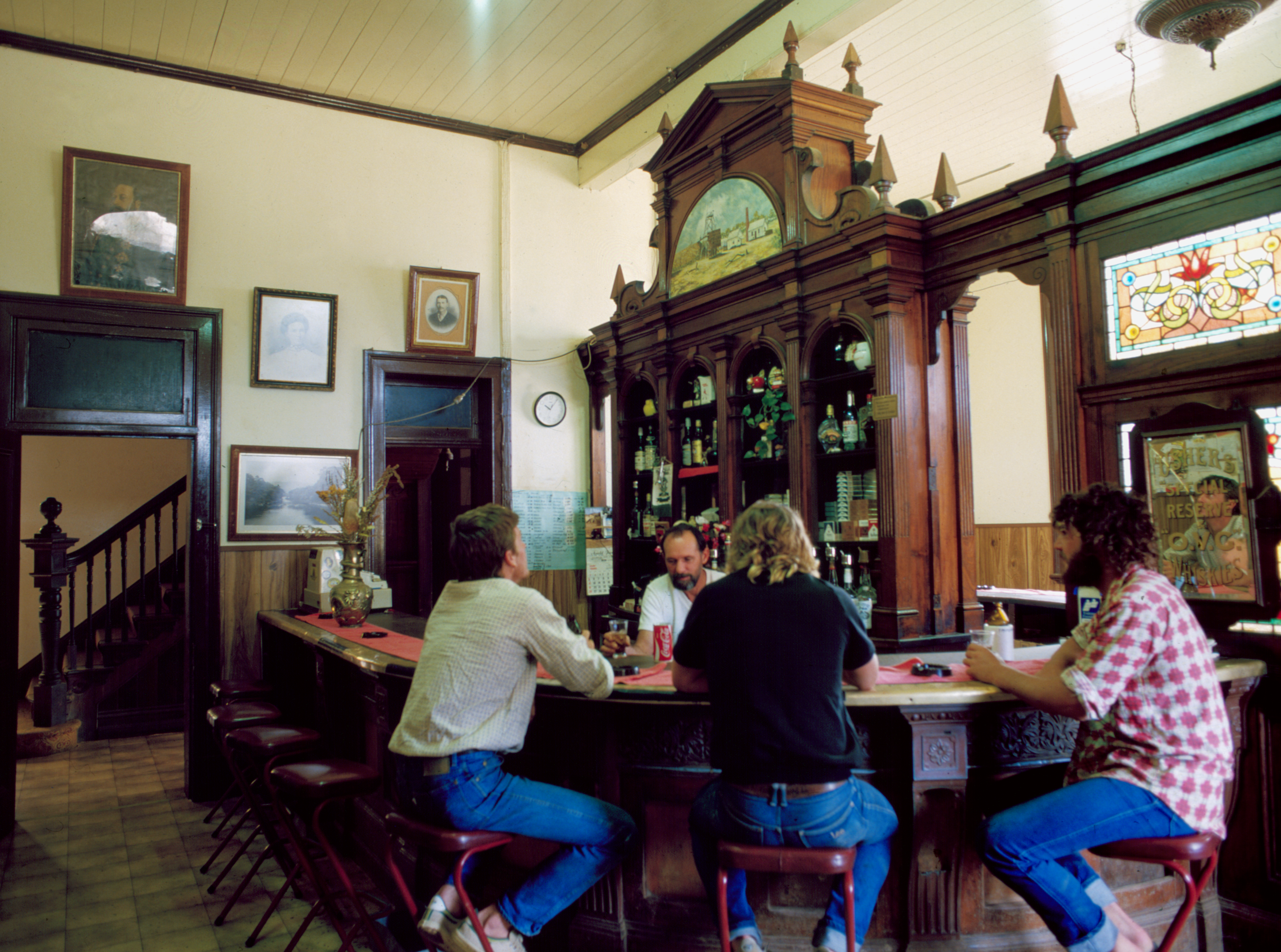
Something "passes the pub test" if ordinary Australian drinkers would deem it to be fair.

In Australian politics, the pub test is a standard for judging policies, proposals and decisions. Something which "passes the pub test" is something the ordinary patron in an Australian pub would understand and accept to be fair, were it to come up in conversation. The test may also be applied to individual people; a politician "passes the pub test" if the average Australian drinker would perceive them as authentic and likeable.

== History ==
The phrase is primarily used in Australia, although there is some evidence of it being used in the United Kingdom as well. The term is thought to have been coined by Prime Minister John Howard. Mark Glynn, a researcher at the Australian National Dictionary Centre, cited Howard as having frequently used the phrase in the 1990s.

Although the pub test is usually raised as a hypothetical, it has been invoked to describe real-life events. Tasmanian Premier Will Hodgman held meet-and-greets at hospitality venues in his state under the name of "The Pub Test". The final leaders' debate at the 2022 Australian federal election, conducted by Seven News, was judged by a panel of 150 undecided voters watching from pubs in marginal seats.

== Reception ==
The test has been compared to reasonable person standards in law; Politico described the test as "Britain's man on the Clapham omnibus but three beers in". Katherine Firth, a lecturer at La Trobe University, compared the pub test to the hypothetical person on "a Bourke Street Tram" referenced in legal decisions in Melbourne.

Despite its widespread use, commentators have criticised the pub test on several grounds. One argument is that pub patrons do not actually represent public opinion; another dismisses pubs as unreliable places for productive intellectual discussion. A different line is that requiring policies to reflect ordinary voters' preferences ensures mediocrity, or that assessing some proposals in the first place requires detailed technical knowledge these voters lack.

== See also ==
- Beer question – Thought experiment in American politics
