= R v Victor =

South African legal case

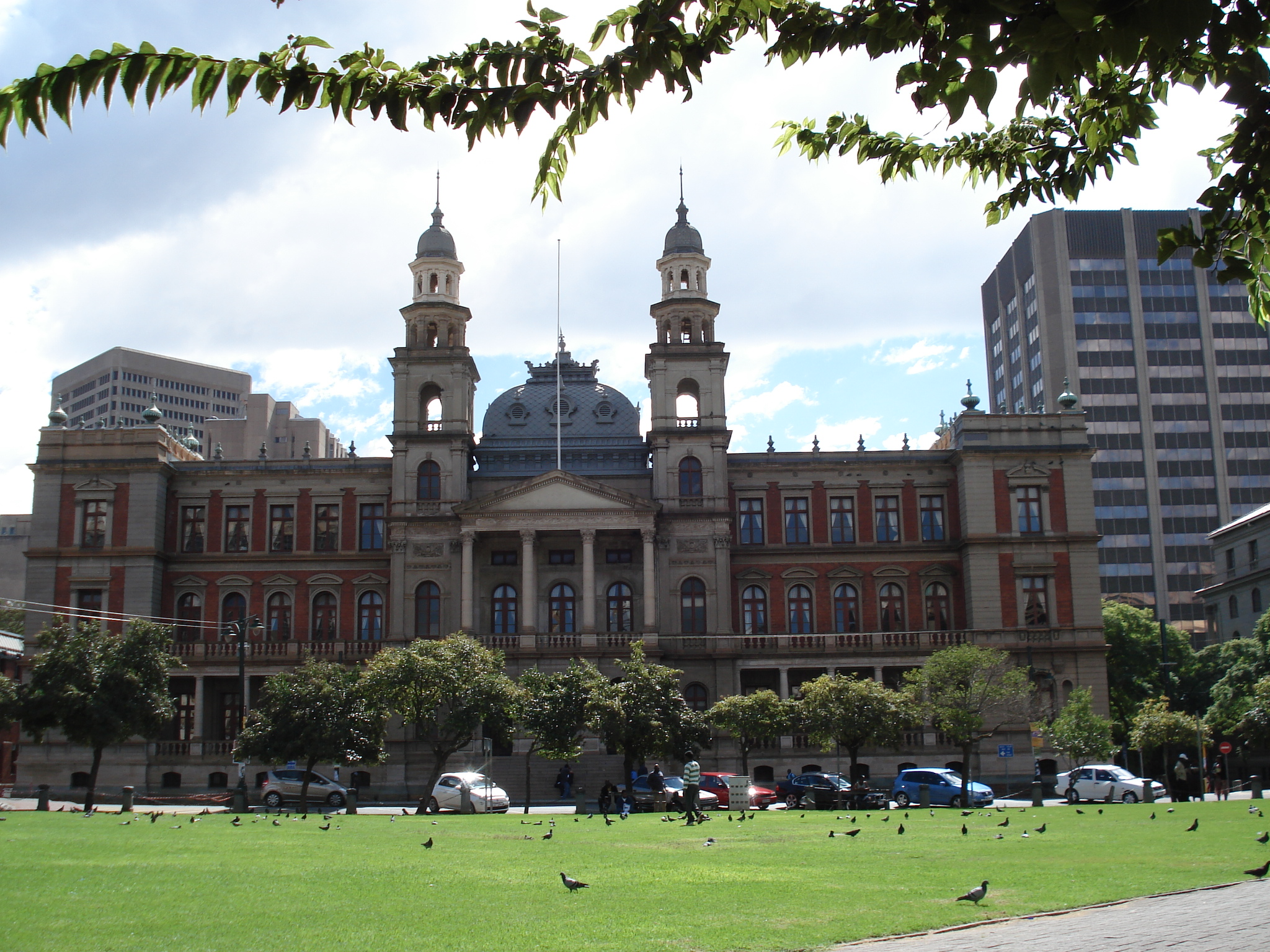
- Court: Transvaal Provincial Division
- Full case name: Rex v Victor
- Decided: 16 October 1942
- Citation: 1943 TPD 77

Court membership
- Judges sitting: Maritz J and Millin J

Keywords
- Criminal law, Traffic offences, Negligence, Involuntary action, Automatism, Epilepsy

R v Victor, an appeal against a conviction by a magistrate, is an important case in South African criminal law, especially as it bears on the defence of automatism. The driver of a motor vehicle was prone to epileptic seizures, and knew as much, but nevertheless put himself behind the wheel of a motor car. He had a seizure while driving and collided with a pedestrian and another car. The court on appeal sustained his conviction by a magistrate on the ground that the negligence which the accused there committed was not so much in the driving of the vehicle, but in his driving at all, knowing of his physical disability. A reasonable person would have foreseen the likelihood of a seizure and refrained from driving.

The appellant's attorneys were Frank & Joffe.

== Facts ==
Whilst driving a motor-car on a public road, the appellant had sustained an epileptic seizure and lost control of the car, which collided with a pedestrian and with another car. He had been charged and convicted of reckless or negligent driving on a public road in contravention of section 31(1)(a) of the Transvaal Motor Ordinance. His defence was that he was not responsible for his actions because of the seizure. He had had epileptic seizures for a period of some thirteen years, but contended that, for certain specified reasons, he did not expect an attack of this nature on the occasion in question, or, alternatively, that he did not expect an attack without a warning feeling, which would have enabled him to take the precaution of bringing the car to a stop.

He stated he was 28 years of age and had been driving a car for eight years. His health was normal except that occasionally he had epilepsy. He had had attacks since the age of 14 or 15, and generally had what he called a "warning feeling" five or ten minutes before an attack. There were, he said, times when he had a giddy feeling which was part of the warning; at other times he had this feeling without any attack. He had paid an unlicensed practitioner for four weeks' treatment and was told that he was cured.

On the morning of the accident he had had an attack preceded by the usual warning. He stated that he had never before had two attacks on the same day.

== Argument ==
V. Rosenstein, for the appellant, contended that there was no negligence within the meaning of sections 31(1)(a) or 31(1)(b) of the Ordinance. JC van Niekerk, for the Crown, argued that the appellant was negligent inasmuch as he drove with knowledge of his physical weakness. Rosenstein, in reply, referred to Gardiner and Lansdown.

== Judgment ==
The appeal was dismissed. Millin J held (and Maritz J concurred) that section 31(1)(a) was wide enough to cover all cases of reckless or negligent driving which would be civilly actionable if proved to be the proximate cause of damage sustained by the plaintiff. Its generality was not cut down by the provision made for special cases in the succeeding subsections. The appellant had correctly been convicted of a contravention of section 31(1)(a) by recklessly or negligently driving a motor car on a public road, inasmuch as his physical condition to his knowledge made it impossible for him to drive in a public road without probable danger to others.

The accused had been negligent, not so much in the driving of the vehicle, but in his driving at all, knowing of his physical disability. A reasonable person would have foreseen the likelihood of a fit and refrained from driving.

== R v Schoonwinkel ==
In a later case with similar facts, R v Schoonwinkel, the accused had had an epileptic seizure at the time of the accident, rendering his mind a blank. The nature of his epilepsy was such that he would normally not have realised or foreseen the dangers of driving, having had only two previous minor attacks, the last a long time before the accident. This evidence, distinguishing the case from Victor, exonerated him from criminal responsibility.

== See also ==
- Automatism (law)
- South African criminal law
- R v Schoonwinkel
