= Man on the Clapham omnibus =

Hypothetical reasonable person in law

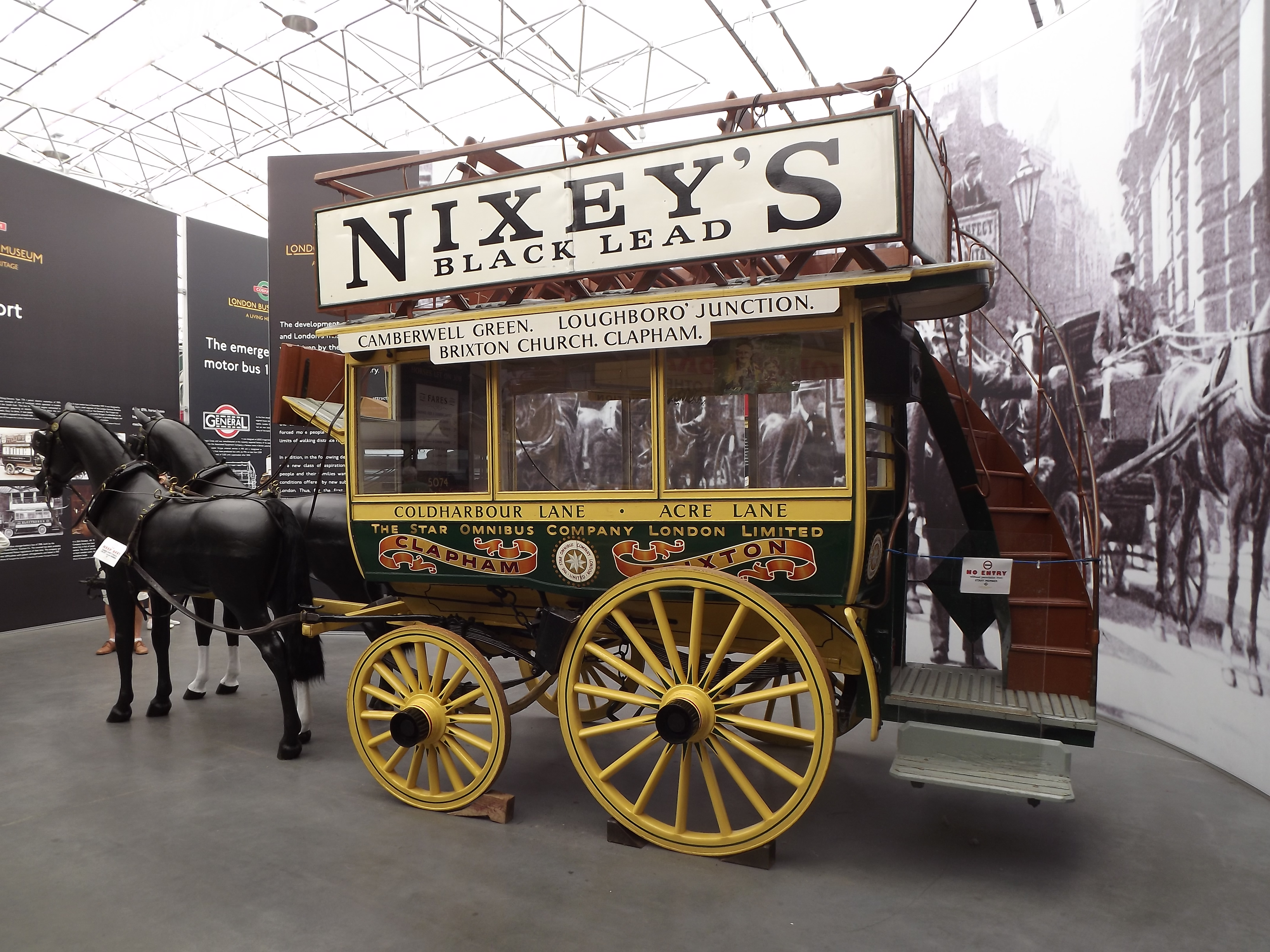
A historical Brixton to Clapham horse-drawn bus on display at London Bus Museum.

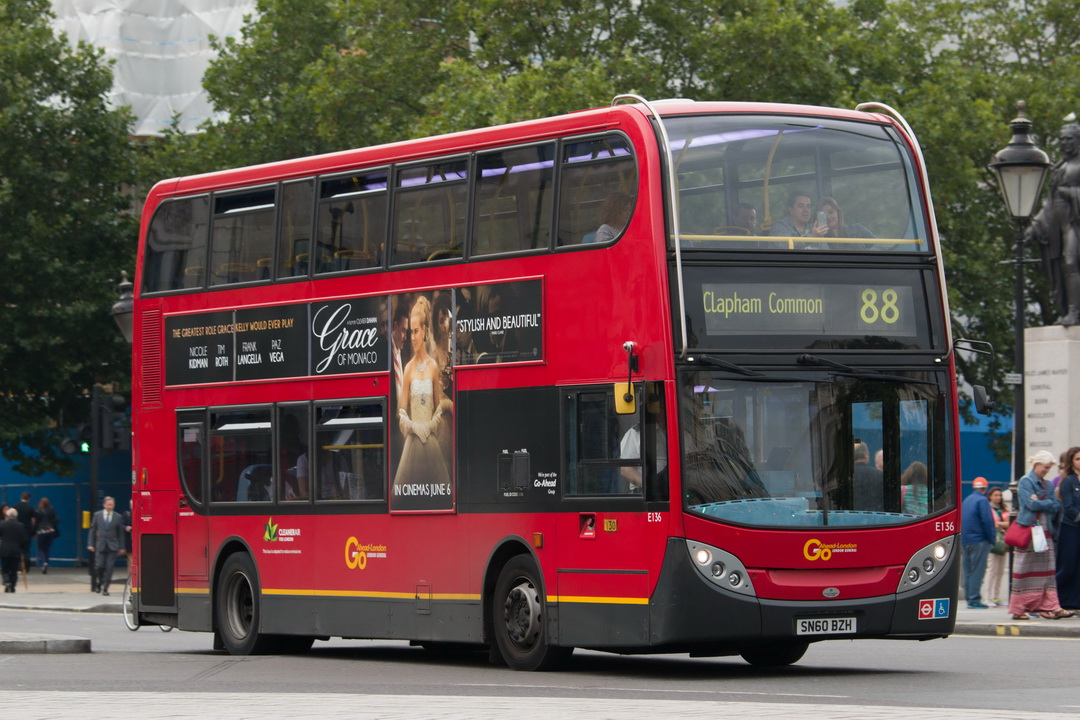
A modern route 88 bus heading to Clapham Common

The man on the Clapham omnibus is a hypothetical ordinary and reasonable person, used by the courts in English law where it is necessary to decide whether a party has acted as a reasonable person would – for example, in a civil action for negligence. The character is a fairly educated, intelligent but undistinguished person, against whom the defendant's conduct can be measured.

The term was introduced into English law during the Victorian era, and is still an important concept in British law. It is also used in other Commonwealth common law jurisdictions, sometimes with suitable modifications to the phrase as an aid to local comprehension. The route of the original "Clapham omnibus" is unknown, but London Buses route 88, which terminates at Clapham Common, was briefly branded as "the Clapham Omnibus" in the 1990s and is sometimes associated with the term.

== History ==
The phrase was reportedly first put to legal use in a judgment by Sir Richard Henn Collins MR in the English Court of Appeal libel case McQuire v. Western Morning News (1903). He attributed the phrase to Lord Bowen and used it in a negative sense:

One thing, however, is perfectly clear, and that is that the jury have no right to substitute their own opinion of the literary merits of the work for that of the critic, or to try the "fairness" of the criticism by any such standard. "Fair," therefore, in this collocation certainly does not mean that which the ordinary reasonable man, "the man on the Clapham omnibus," as Lord Bowen phrased it, the juryman common or special, would think a correct appreciation of the work; and it is of the highest importance to the community that the critic should be saved from any such possibility.

It may be derived from the phrase "Public opinion ... is the opinion of the bald-headed man at the back of the omnibus", a description by the 19th-century journalist Walter Bagehot of a normal London man. Clapham, in South London, was at the time an undistinguished commuter suburb seen to represent "ordinary" London, and in the 19th century would have been served by horse-drawn omnibuses.

Lord Justice Greer used the phrase in Hall v. Brooklands Auto-Racing Club (1933) to define the standard of care a defendant must live up to in order to avoid being found negligent.

The use of the phrase was reviewed by the UK Supreme Court in Healthcare at Home Limited v. The Common Services Agency (2014), where Lord Reed said:

1. The Clapham omnibus has many passengers. The most venerable is the reasonable man, who was born during the reign of Victoria but remains in vigorous health. Amongst the other passengers are the right-thinking member of society, familiar from the law of defamation, the officious bystander, the reasonable parent, the reasonable landlord, and the fair-minded and informed observer, all of whom have had season tickets for many years.

2. The horse-drawn bus between Knightsbridge and Clapham, which Lord Bowen is thought to have had in mind, was real enough. But its most famous passenger, and the others I have mentioned, are legal fictions. They belong to an intellectual tradition of defining a legal standard by reference to a hypothetical person, which stretches back to the creation by Roman jurists of the figure of the bonus paterfamilias...

3. It follows from the nature of the reasonable man, as a means of describing a standard applied by the court, that it would be misconceived for a party to seek to lead evidence from actual passengers on the Clapham omnibus as to how they would have acted in a given situation or what they would have foreseen, to establish how the reasonable man would have acted or what he would have foreseen. Even if the party offered to prove that his witnesses were reasonable men, the evidence would be beside the point. The behaviour of the reasonable man is not established by the evidence of witnesses, but by the application of a legal standard by the court. The court may require to be informed by evidence of circumstances which bear on its application of the standard of the reasonable man in any particular case; but it is then for the court to determine the outcome, in those circumstances, of applying that impersonal standard.

4. In recent times, some additional passengers from the European Union have boarded the Clapham omnibus. This appeal is concerned with one of them: the reasonably well-informed and normally diligent tenderer.

== Other related common law jurisdictions ==
The expression has also been incorporated in Canadian patent jurisprudence, notably Beloit v. Valmet Oy in its discussion of the test for obviousness.

In Australia, the "Clapham omnibus" expression has inspired the New South Wales and Victorian equivalents, "the man on the Bondi tram" (a now disused tram route in Sydney), "the man on the Bourke Street tram" (Melbourne), and "the ordinary person on the Belconnen omnibus" (Canberra).

In Hong Kong, the equivalent expression is "the man on the Shau Kei Wan tram".

== See also ==
- A moron in a hurry
- Bellwether
- Person having ordinary skill in the art
- Placeholder name
- Prudent man rule
- Objective historian
- Pub test
