= Nolo contendere =

Plea in which the defendant neither admits nor disputes a charge

Nolo contendere (/ˌnoʊloʊ kənˈtɛndəri/) is a type of legal plea used in some jurisdictions in the United States. It is also referred to as a plea of no contest or no defense. It is a plea where the defendant neither admits nor disputes a charge, and it serves as an alternative to pleading guilty or not guilty. A no-contest plea means that defendants refuse to admit or deny guilt but accept punishment as if guilty, and is often offered as a part of a plea bargain.

Defendants who believe themselves to be innocent may choose this plea when the expected cost of contesting the charge exceeds the cost of accepting the penalty. If the likely punishment is minor, such as a small fine, probation or community service, it can be cheaper, faster, and less disruptive to plead no contest than pursue an acquittal at trial.

The plea is recognized in United States federal criminal courts, and many state criminal courts. In many jurisdictions, a plea of nolo contendere is not a typical right and carries various restrictions on its use. Nolo contendere is a Latin phrase for "I do not wish to contend" (nōlō contendere, Latin pronunciation: [ˈnoːɫoː kɔnˈtɛndɛrɛ]).

== United States ==
In the United States, state law determines whether, and under what circumstances, a defendant may plead no contest in state criminal cases. In federal court, the Federal Rules of Criminal Procedure only allow a nolo contendere plea to be entered with the court's consent; before accepting the plea, the court is required to "consider the parties' views and the public interest in the effective administration of justice".

=== Residual effects ===
A nolo contendere plea has the same immediate effects as a plea of guilty, but may have different residual effects or consequences in future actions. For instance, a conviction arising from a nolo contendere plea is subject to any and all penalties, fines, and forfeitures of a conviction from a guilty plea in the same case, and can be considered as an aggravating factor in future criminal actions. However, unlike a guilty plea, a defendant in a nolo contendere plea may not be required to allocute the charges. This means that a nolo contendere conviction typically may not be used to establish either negligence per se, malice, or whether the acts were committed at all in later civil proceedings related to the same set of facts as the criminal prosecution.

Under the Federal Rules of Evidence, and in those states whose rules of evidence are similar or identical to them, nolo contendere pleas may not be used to defeat the hearsay prohibition if offered as an "admission by [a] party-opponent". Assuming the appropriate gravity of the charge, and all other things being equal, a guilty plea to the same charge would cause the reverse effect: An opponent at trial could introduce the plea, over a hearsay objection, as evidence to establish a certain fact.

=== Compared with Alford plea ===
Nolo contendere plea is similar to an Alford plea (also known as a "best interest plea"). An Alford plea allows a criminal defendant formally to record an admission of guilt for the charges, yet, at the same time, declare their innocence regarding those charges. Under an Alford plea, the defendant agrees to accept all the consequences of a guilty verdict—such as accepting punishment. An Alford plea bypasses the full process of a criminal trial. The primary distinction between an Alford plea and a nolo contendere plea is that, in an Alford plea, the defendant pleads guilty (in a formal sense) yet in a nolo contendere plea, the defendant does not assert innocence or guilt. A formal admission of guilt under an Alford plea can be used against the defendant in future civil suits, whereas nolo contendere pleas cannot.

=== Individual states ===
==== Alaska ====
In Alaska, a criminal conviction based on a nolo contendere plea may be used against the defendant in future civil actions. The Alaska Supreme Court ruled in 2006 that a "conviction based on a no contest plea will collaterally estop the criminal defendant from denying any element in a subsequent civil action against him that was necessarily established by the conviction, as long as the prior conviction was for a serious criminal offense and the defendant in fact had the opportunity for a full and fair hearing".

==== California ====
In California, a nolo contendere plea is known as a West plea after a seminal case involving plea bargains, People v. West (1970) 3 Cal.3d 595. The state Board of Pharmacy considers a plea of nolo contendere to be deemed a conviction with regard to issuing licenses for pharmacies, pharmacists and drug wholesalers.

A nolo contendere plea to any felony is considered exactly equivalent to a guilty plea for the purposes of civil actions; this plea to any non-felony is not admissible to a civil action.

==== Florida ====
In Florida, the Supreme Court held in 2005 that no-contest convictions may be treated as prior convictions for the purposes of future sentencing.

==== Michigan ====
In Michigan, "A nolo contendere plea does not admit guilt, it merely communicates to the court that the criminal defendant does not wish to contest the state's accusations and will acquiesce in the imposition of punishment." A nolo contendere plea may be appropriate "where the defendant would not be able to supply a sufficient factual basis for a guilty plea because he or she was intoxicated on the night of the incident, where there is the possibility of future civil litigation resulting from the offense, or where a defendant cannot remember the events which led to his or her being charged with a crime".

A no contest plea prevents the court from eliciting a defendant's admission of guilt, but the result of the defendant's plea not to contest the charges against him or her is the same as if the defendant had admitted guilt. If a defendant pleads no contest to a charged offense, with the exception of questioning the defendant about his or her role in the charged offense, the court must proceed in the same manner as if the defendant had pleaded guilty. A plea of no contest to a felony offense requires the court's consent.

A defendant's no contest plea to criminal charges does not estop that defendant from denying responsibility in a later civil action arising from the same conduct.

==== South Carolina ====
According to South Carolina code, the defendant in any misdemeanor case in any of the courts may enter a plea of nolo contendere with the consent of the court. The plea of guilty will be recorded on defendant records and will not affect sentencing.

==== Texas ====
In Texas, the right to appeal the results of a plea bargain taken from a plea of either nolo contendere or "guilty" is highly restricted. Defendants who have entered a plea of nolo contendere may only appeal the judgment of the court if the appeal is based on written pretrial motions ruled upon by the court.

==== Virginia ====
The Virginia Rules of Evidence differ from the parallel federal rules in that a nolo contendere plea entered in a criminal case is admissible in a related civil proceeding.

== Commonwealth ==
In the Commonwealth countries—such as England and Wales, Scotland, Canada, and Australia—the plea of nolo contendere is not permitted. If a defendant refuses to enter a plea, the court will record a plea of "not guilty".

== See also ==
- Nolle prosequi
