= Beer question =

Thought experiment in American politics

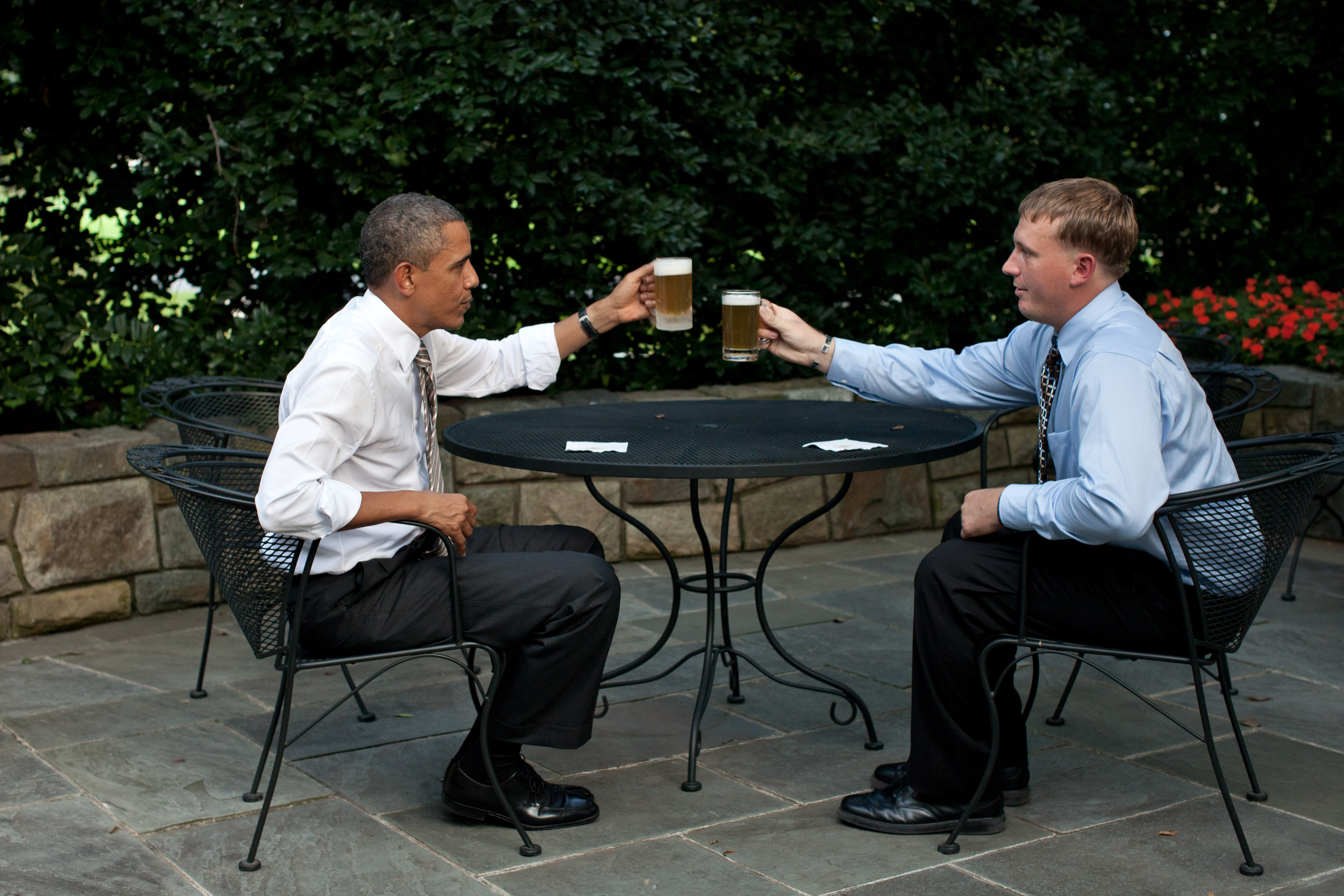
Barack Obama drinking beer with Dakota Meyer in September 2011

The beer question is a thought experiment in politics that attempts to measure authenticity and likability in politicians by asking or polling voters about which politicians they would prefer to drink beer with, as in, spending casual time "hanging out" with. The question was polled during the 2000 United States presidential election. The question has been criticized for the gender bias implicit in referencing a predominantly male drinking culture and some have questioned the relevance of likability in choosing candidates for public office.

== Synopsis ==
The beer question, often utilized in opinion polling, asks respondents a simple question, generally along the lines of "With which candidate would you rather have a beer?" The question is generally thought to provide information on how voters perceive some combination of likability and authenticity in politicians, with Erica J. Seifert describing it in her book The Politics of Authenticity in Presidential Campaigns, 1976-2008 as "[combining] a battery of character and personality questions typically asked by academic and professional polling organizations".

While an op-ed in The Washington Post argues that the beer question is a "shorthand" for likability, Seth Stevenson with Slate claims that the question better measures authenticity, citing Donald Trump as an example of someone who would be authentic, and desirable to have a beer with, but not likable.

The thought experiment is also found in hiring scenarios, dubbed the beer test, which Carolyn Betts of Mashable described as "In a nutshell, it's when a hiring manager envisions the company team sharing a drink with a potential candidate – and if all goes well, in his or her head, then maybe it's time to shake hands and sign the contract".

== Examples ==
=== George W. Bush ===
A Samuel Adams/Roper Starch poll in the run-up to the 2000 United States presidential election—described sarcastically as "very scientific" by Seifert in her book—found that respondents would generally prefer to have a beer with George W. Bush, the Republican candidate, rather than with his Democratic opponent Al Gore.

A Zogby/Williams poll conducted in 2004 found that 57 percent of swing voters would rather have a drink with Bush than with his opponent in the 2004 United States presidential election, John Kerry.

=== 2016 presidential election ===
During the 2016 United States presidential election, significant attention was given to the beer question and how it related to the candidates. While Donald Trump, the eventual Republican nominee and victor, was generally viewed favorably with regard to the beer question, other candidates were thought to be less authentic in this respect, particularly Democratic nominee Hillary Clinton. An NBC News/Survey Monkey poll conducted during the 2016 Republican Party presidential primaries found that voters would prefer to have a beer with Donald Trump, with 16 percent saying that they would rather have a beer with him. Ben Carson and Marco Rubio constituted eleven and four percent of the responses, respectively. In Slate, Seth Stevenson hypothesized that Trump scored the highest in that poll due to his unpredictability, writing "What other candidate calls his opponent a 'pussy' on camera and then just owns it? Dude seems like he'd be fun after you got a couple shots in him." While Stevenson goes on to write that Republican candidate Ted Cruz said that "If you want someone to grab a beer with, I might not be that guy", an op-ed in The Washington Post cited a poll stating that Republican voters narrowly prefer Cruz to Trump with respect to the beer question.

A June 2016 poll from Rasmussen Reports found that 45 percent of respondents would rather have a beer with Donald Trump than his opponent, Hillary Clinton. 37 percent of respondents said that they would rather have a beer with Clinton, and 18 percent said that they were undecided. While male respondents more strongly preferred a beer with Trump, female respondents narrowly preferred a beer with Clinton. Likability proved to be a problem for the Clinton campaign, and Leonard Steinhorn with The Hill argued during the campaign that coverage of Clinton as unlikable in the press hampers her chances for election.

=== Canada ===
In a poll carried out by Abacus Data for the 2011 Canadian federal election, New Democratic Party leader Jack Layton was named as the party leader most Canadians would like to have a beer with. A poll on the same topic in 2014 named Justin Trudeau as the party leader most Canadians would like to have a beer with, with 44% of respondents saying they would like to do so.

=== France ===
In a 2022 poll carried out by IFOP, 1,000 French people were asked whether or not they would drink a beer with candidates in the 2022 French presidential election. The highest polling candidate in this question was Jean Lassalle, with 39% responding that they would like to have a beer with him. The eventual winner of the election, Emmanuel Macron, had the second-highest rating in this question with 37%.

== Historical precedents ==
In Robert Munford's 1770 satirical play The Candidates, a character expresses a liking for the fictional politician of Sir John Toddy because he "wont turn his back upon a poor man, but will take a chearful cup with one as well as another", comparing him favorably "to any of your whifflers who han't the heart to be generous".

== Criticism ==
Writing for The Atlantic, Megan Garber examined the beer question through the lens of American television political drama The West Wing, focusing particularly on a season four episode titled "Game On". Garber argues that while the episode may be only peripherally related to beer, "Game On" does take on the beer question in how it addresses political authenticity and folksiness. In "Game On", the conflict between Josiah Bartlet, the incumbent Democratic president, and Robert Ritchie, his Republican challenger, comes to a head. Ritchie, a governor from Florida, is portrayed as folksy, likable, and down-to-earth, while protagonist Bartlet is portrayed as intelligent, but arrogant and aloof. Garber criticized how The West Wing chose to portray Ritchie as stupid, unempathetic, and "a walking (well, dais-grasping) straw man, standing in for a great many of the stereotypes within which progressives are fond of packaging conservatives." However, she more broadly agreed with her interpretation of the episode's message, which was one that argued against the idea that politicians should be selected based on their ability to connect with everyday Americans:

The Beer Question, after all, is the wrong question to ask. Do we really want a leader who is on our level—or is it better, actually, to have a leader who is demonstrably above us? My money's on the latter. And so is The West Wing's. You can read "Game On" as a lot of things—smarmy, strawmanny, overly convinced of a single debate's ability to sway the electorate's affections—but it also makes a pretty good argument for choosing leaders according to their skills and their knowledge, rather than their charm.

Leonard Steinhorn, writing for The Hill, also criticized the beer question for similar reasons. He argued that press coverage of a candidate as "unlikable" creates a cycle of polling and analysis through that lens that can be hard to escape, and prevent a candidate from gaining traction. Steinhorn further emphasizes the idea that likability generally has little impact on leadership skill, concluding his article by writing "shame on us if we let likability override consequence. And yes, let's have a beer on that."

Seth Stevenson, writing for Slate, argued that the question was improperly masculine, invoking a scene that puts the participants "Shoulder to shoulder. Eyes on the football game. Insecurities swallowed." Stevenson commented that "it's telling that we don't ask which candidate you'd most want to be in your book club."

== See also ==
- Pub test – Standard in Australian politics
- Man or bear
