= Puerto Marín Balmaceda Airport =

- IATA: none; ICAO: SCMA

Summary
- Airport type: Public
- Serves: Puerto Raúl Marín Balmaceda (es), Chile
- Elevation AMSL: 10 ft / 3 m
- Coordinates: 43°47′15″S 72°57′05″W

Map
- Location of Puerto Marín Balmaceda Airport in Chile

Runways
Direction	Length		Surface
Direction	m	ft	Surface
08/26	700	2,297	Gravel
- Source: Landings.com Google Maps GCM

Puerto Marín Balmaceda Airport (ICAO: SCMA) is an airport serving Puerto Raúl Marín Balmaceda (es), a town in the Aysén Region of Chile. The town is on the eastern shore of a small peninsula that separates the Palena River and the Rodríguez River at their entry into the Gulf of Corcovado.

The airport is just south of the town. East approach and departure are over the water. There are hills east and west of the runway.

== See also ==
- Transport in Chile
- List of airports in Chile
