= Channel check =

In financial analysis, a channel check is third-party research on a company's business based on collecting information from the distribution channels of the company. Performed by third party researchers and financial analysts in order to collect information about a company's business, checks may help to value the company or be used to perform due diligence in various contexts.

== Channel check process ==
The channel check process includes interviewing people within other organizations connected to the company's supply and distribution channels. These interviews usually occur without the target company's knowledge. For example, a channel check could include one or multiple conversations with a store manager to understand their targeted customer. Analysts generally look for top products, customer buying patterns and past performance.

Analysts could also contact one or several suppliers or vendors to obtain information about the targeted company. In these interviews analysts are looking for quantity of materials being demanded and prices. Suppliers could also help analysts to see the "bigger picture": a company's production plans, new products and more. Suppliers may also give an indication of the raw material availability, finished product inventory levels, promotion plans to the Analysts.

Channel checks can give insights complementary to balance sheet analysis, such as distributor and retailer attitudes towards a product and its competitors, seasonal and geographic variation, inventory levels (notably channel stuffing), and so on.

In the United States, the Securities and Exchange Commission has clarified that channel checks are legitimate tools of business research but they should not make illegal use of insider information.

== See also ==
- Due diligence
- Standard of care
- Duty of care
- Business ethics
