= Nursery World =

British child education magazine

- Editor: Liz Roberts
- Categories: Trade magazine
- Frequency: Fortnightly
- Founded: 1925
- Company: Mark Allen Group
- Country: United Kingdom
- Based in: London
- Language: English
- Website: www.nurseryworld-magazine.co.uk
- ISSN: 0029-6422

Nursery World is a fortnightly magazine for early years education and childcare professionals in the United Kingdom. It was first published in 1925 by Faber and Gwyer and sold to Benn Brothers in 1927 in exchange for ten years' royalty payments.

The magazine is now published in print form and online. The editor is Liz Roberts. In 2007, Haymarket Media Group acquired Nursery World from TSL Education. In April 2013, Haymarket sold Nursery World to Mark Allen Group.

It organises an annual show, the Nursery World Big Day Out Show, which is co-sponsored by 4Children, the National Children's Bureau, the Professional Association for Childcare and Early Years and the Pre-school Learning Alliance.
