= Coram PACEY =

British charity and membership organization

- Formation: 1977 (as National Childminding Association); relaunched 2013 as PACEY; relaunched 2025 as Coram PACEY
- Legal status: registered charity and professional membership organisation
- Headquarters: London
- Location: 41 Brunswick Square, London WC1N 1AZ
- Region served: England and Wales, Isle of Man and Channel Islands
- Members: 35,000
- Official language: English; Welsh
- Head: Ka Lai Brightley-Hodges
- Main organ: Childcare Professional (magazine, published three times a year)
- Parent organization: Coram
- Budget: £3.9 million
- Staff: 40
- Website: www.corampacey.org.uk

Coram PACEY is a charity and membership organisation based in London and working in England and Wales. A standard-setting organisation, it promotes best practice and support childcare professionals to deliver high standards of care and learning.

== History ==
Coram PACEY was founded, as the National Childminding Association (NCMA), in 1977 by a small group of registered childminders, local authority staff and parents. Originally the Association covered the UK, but the Scottish Childminding Association (SCMA) and the Northern Ireland Childminding Association (NICMA) now support childminding in Scotland and Northern Ireland. NCMA changed its name to Professional Association for Childcare and Early Years (PACEY) in March 2013, to reflect the broadening of its membership to include nursery workers as well as childminders and nannies and the growing recognition of its members' professionalism. On 2 May 2025 it joined the Coram Group as Coram PACEY.

== Organisation ==
Coram PACEY's head office is in central London. It also has an office in Cardiff, Wales. The Head of Coram PACEY, since 1 October 2025, is Ka Lai Brightley-Hodges.

== Registered childminders and nannies ==
Registered childminders care for one or more children under the age of eight for more than a total of two hours a day, usually in the childminder's home, for payment. They are usually self-employed and are inspected by Ofsted in England or Care Inspectorate Wales to ensure they are providing a safe and stimulating environment for these children.

Unlike registered childminders, nannies are employed by parents and work in the family home. They are not required to register with Ofsted in England or with Care Inspectorate Wales. However, to reassure parents that they have had an enhanced Criminal Records Bureau check, first-aid and basic childcare training, nannies can join the voluntary Ofsted register or Care Inspectorate Wales's Voluntary Approval Scheme.

== Research ==
At its 2005 annual conference, the organisation's then-President, British childcare expert Dr Penelope Leach, outlined details of the findings of the longest and most detailed studies of UK childcare, which concluded that young children who are looked after by their mothers do significantly better in developmental tests than those cared for in nurseries, by childminders or relatives. It found babies and toddlers fared worst when they were given group nursery care. Those cared for by friends or grandparents or other relatives did a little better while those looked after by nannies or childminders were rated second only to those cared for by mothers. The study, by researchers led by Leach and colleagues Kathy Sylva and Alan Stein, began in 1998 and involved 1,200 children and their families from north London and Oxfordshire. Mothers were interviewed when their babies were three months old and again when they were 10, 18, 36 and 51 months.

In March 2013, PACEY's report Childcare – not just a job, a vocation, based on research carried out in association with Nursery World magazine and NannyTax, found that low pay and poor status are concerns across the childcare profession – among childminders, nursery workers and nannies. In spite of this, the study found that for every £1 childcare workers are paid, they generate between £7 and £9.50 worth of benefits to society.

In September 2013, a survey by PACEY of more than 2,000 UK childcare workers, parents and teachers found that social skills and independence were rated more highly than key academic skills as indicators of young children's readiness to start school.

== Campaigns ==
In 2001, it campaigned for a reversal of new government regulations which allowed childminders to smack babies and toddlers and to smoke in the presence of children with parents' consent.

In April 2012, it launched a campaign, Individual Inspection Matters, calling on the Government to retain individual registration and inspection of childminders in England. The campaign was launched in response to concerns that the Government is planning to take childminding out of the current inspection and regulation system and that this could lead to deregulation or regulation with a "lighter touch". It expressed concern that stepping away from individual Ofsted inspection threatened childminders' professional status.

In March 2013, PACEY criticised government plans to increase the number of children that childcare providers can look after in England and to introduce childminder agencies as being "likely to reduce quality for children".

== Communications ==
Coram PACEY's magazine, Childcare Professional, is published three times a year. Members have access to helplines and support services.

== See also ==
- Scottish Childminding Association
- Northern Ireland Childminding Association
- Child care
- Early childhood education
- Child development
- Nanny (Childminder redirects there)
