= Northern Ireland Childminding Association =

Organisation in Northern Ireland

- Abbreviation: NICMA
- Legal status: charity and membership organisation
- Headquarters: Belfast
- Region served: Northern Ireland
- Official language: English
- Chief Executive: Patricia Lewsley-Mooney CBE
- Staff: 26
- Website: www.nicma.org

The Northern Ireland Childminding Association (NICMA) is a charity and membership organisation, based in Belfast, that represents childminding in Northern Ireland. It promotes quality home-based childcare and learning for the benefit of children, families and communities in Northern Ireland and its services include a childminding information and vacancy helpline. NICMA's chair is Norma Shearer and as of 2024 its chief executive is Patricia Lewsley-Mooney CBE.

== History ==
The Northern Ireland Childminding Association (NICMA) is a charity and membership organisation, based in Belfast, that represents childminding in Northern Ireland. It was founded in 1984. It promotes quality home-based childcare and learning for the benefit of children, families and communities in Northern Ireland and its services include a childminding information and vacancy helpline.

NICMA's chair is Norma Shearer and its chief executive is Patricia Lewsley-Mooney CBE. In 2024 NICMA highlighted a halving of the number of registered childminders in Northern Ireland from 4,383 minders in 2005 to 2,000.

NICMA has run a pilot scheme to address the shortage of childcare places in rural areas. This was funded by the Department of Agriculture and Rural Development's Rural Childcare Programme.

== Activities ==
NICMA was founded in 1984. NICMA promotes quality home-based childcare and learning for the benefit of children, families and communities in Northern Ireland. Its services include a childminding information and vacancy helpline. It also runs childminding groups, and networking activities for childminders, and helps members with professional development, equipment and emergency sickness cover. NICMA holds an annual conference, and employs a development officer to support childminders.

== See also ==
- Day care
- Professional Association for Childcare and Early Years (PACEY) (England and Wales)
- Scottish Childminding Association
