= Scottish Childminding Association =

- Abbreviation: SCMA
- Legal status: charity and membership organisation
- Headquarters: Stirling
- Region served: Scotland
- Official language: English
- Chief Executive: Maggie Simpson
- Main organ: Childminding magazine (quarterly)
- Website: www.childminding.org

The Scottish Childminding Association (SCMA) is a charity and membership organisation based in Stirling, Scotland. It provides support, training and information to childminders in Scotland. SCMA's convenor is Barbara Anne Dennistoun and its chief executive is Graeme McAllister.

== Registration ==
By law, childminding services in Scotland must be registered with the Care Inspectorate the independent regulator of social care and social work services across Scotland. The Care Inspectorate regulates childminding services according to the Public Services Reform (Scotland) Act 2010 and assesses their quality to make sure they meet the National Care Standards which are published by the Scottish Government.

== Community Childminding ==
SCMA's Community Childminding Service provides short-term childcare for families in need. Community Childminding Services currently operate in Aberdeen, Dumfries and Galloway, Fife, Glasgow, West Lothian and the Scottish Borders.

== Communications ==
The association publishes a quarterly magazine, Childminding, and operates a helpline.

== See also ==
- Day care
- Northern Ireland Childminding Association
- Professional Association for Childcare and Early Years (PACEY) (England and Wales)
