= R v Schoonwinkel =

South African legal case

- Court: Cape Provincial Division
- Full case name: R v Schoonwinkel
- Argued: 11 March 1953
- Decided: 11 March 1953
- Charge: culpable homicide
- Citation: 1953 (3) SA 136 (C)

Court membership
- Judge sitting: Steyn J and assessors

Case opinions
- Decision by: Steyn J

Keywords
- Criminal law, criminal liability, automatism, epilepsy, culpable homicide

In R v Schoonwinkel, an important case in South African criminal law, particularly as it applies to the defence of automatism, the driver of a motor vehicle was charged with culpable homicide, having collided with and killed a passenger in another car. The accused had had an epileptic seizure at the time of the accident, rendering his mind a blank. The nature of his epilepsy was such that he would normally not have realised or foreseen the dangers of driving, having had only two previous minor attacks, the last a long time before the accident. This evidence, distinguishing this case from R v Victor, exonerated him from criminal responsibility. The court found additionally that this was not a case falling under the provisions of the Mental Disorders Act, read with section 219 of the Criminal Procedure Act.

== See also ==
- Automatism (law)
- R v Victor 1943 TPD 77
- South African criminal law
