= Miller v. National Broadcasting Co. =

US tort law case

- Court: California Court of Appeals
- Full case name: Brownie Miller et al., Plaintiffs and Appellants, v. National Broadcasting Company et al., Defendants and Respondents.
- Decided: December 18, 1986
- Citation: 187 Cal. App. 3d 1463; 232 Cal.Rptr. 668

Court membership
- Judges sitting: Vaino Spencer, Lloyd Hanson, Gilbert Ruiz (Note: Filling vacancy)

Case opinions
- Decision by: Hanson

Miller v. National Broadcasting Co. 232 Cal. Rptr 668 (1986) is a US tort law case on negligent infliction of emotional distress.

== Background ==
On October 30, 1979, an NBC camera crew was following a group of Los Angeles Fire Department firefighters and paramedics. A call came in about a man having a heart attack. The camera crew and the paramedics rushed to the home of Brownie and Dave Miller. The camera crew, without consent from anyone, rushed into the house with the paramedics and taped footage of Mr. Dave Miller having what would be a fatal heart attack. The crew later that night would put the footage on the air, also without consent. Brownie Miller filed suit against NBC, Ruben Norte (a producer for NBC) and the city of Los Angeles for trespass, invasion of privacy and infliction of emotional distress.

== Decision ==
The Court of Appeals ruled ultimately in favor of the plaintiff, reversing the District Court's summary judgement. In an opinion written by Justice Lloyd Hanson, the court determined that the media does not have the same access privileges to a private property as emergency responders, even if the media obtained consent to follow the emergency responders. Hanson wrote, "One seeking emergency medical attention does not thereby "open the door" for persons without any clearly identifiable and justifiable official reason who may wish to enter the premises where the medical aid is being administered ... the clear line of demarcation between the public interest served by public officials and that served by private business must not be obscured."
