= Game On (The West Wing) =

- The West Wing episode
- Episode no.: Season 4 Episode 6
- Directed by: Alex Graves
- Written by: Aaron Sorkin; Paul Redford
- Production code: 175306
- Original air date: October 30, 2002

Guest appearances
- Hal Holbrook; James Brolin; Joshua Malina; Kathleen York; Joanna Gleason; NiCole Robinson; Danica McKellar; Tony Amendola; John Aniston

Episode chronology
← Previous "Debate Camp"	Next → "Election Night"
- The West Wing season 4

"Game On" is the sixth episode of the fourth season of The West Wing. The episode aired on October 30, 2002, on NBC. The episode features Josiah Bartlet, the President of the United States, debating against his opponent in the upcoming presidential election, as well as Sam Seaborn meeting the new character of Will Bailey and Leo McGarry attempting to stop the shipment of arms to a terrorist group. Reception for the episode was mixed, with differing viewpoints on how the show portrayed the dueling ideologies of liberalism and conservatism in the United States.

== Cast ==
- Martin Sheen as Josiah Bartlet, the President of the United States
- John Spencer as Leo McGarry, the White House Chief of Staff
- Bradley Whitford as Josh Lyman, the Deputy White House Chief of Staff
- Janel Moloney as Donna Moss, the assistant to Josh Lyman
- Dulé Hill as Charlie Young, the Personal Aide to the President
- Richard Schiff as Toby Ziegler, the White House Communications Director
- Allison Janney as C. J. Cregg, the White House Press Secretary
- Rob Lowe as Sam Seaborn, the Deputy White House Communications Director
- Joshua Malina as Will Bailey, the manager for Horton Wilde's congressional campaign

== Plot ==
The episode centers around preparing Josiah Bartlet for his sole debate against Robert Ritchie, the Governor of Florida and Republican nominee for president in the upcoming election. The opening scene of the episode depicts a prank related to debate preparation—Bartlet bets ten dollars against the rest of the White House senior staff that he can dupe Toby Ziegler into believing that Bartlet is a having a "crisis of confidence" for the upcoming debate. After learning that he'd been tricked, Toby simply comments to Josh Lyman, "he's ready". Josh is also tasked in the scene with finding "ten word" answers, sound-bite answers to policy questions that show that the Bartlet campaign can be folksy and in touch with the American public.

Toby informs C. J. that a Democrat is going to be providing support for Ritchie in the post-debate spin room, and suggests that C. J. find Albie Duncan, a Republican at the U.S. Department of State, who has agreed to similarly provide support for Bartlet. Despite objections that Duncan is "a little bit" crazy, C. J. prepares Duncan for the spin room on the flight to the debate. After practicing an answer on free trade, Duncan tells C. J. that trade is complicated, and that these simplified sound bites are misleading; he also criticizes Josh for trying to come up with the ten word answers. During the debate, Ritchie answers a question on his tax plan simply by stating that "The American people know how to spend their money better than the federal government does." Bartlet, although given time for a rebuttal, ignores the content of Ritchie's answer, responding with the following:

There it is... That's the ten-word answer my staff's been looking for for two weeks. There it is. Ten-word answers can kill you in political campaigns. They're the tip of the sword. Here's my question: What are the next ten words of your answer? Your taxes are too high? So are mine. Give me the next ten words. How are we going to do it? Give me ten after that, I'll drop out of the race right now.

In the post-debate room, Duncan gives his prepackaged answer on trade, but C. J. steps into the gaggle, asking "Isn't there a decent chance you and the President are wrong? ... I mention this because the President just reminded us that complexity isn't a vice." After that, the entire senior staff leaves the spin room, reasoning that Bartlet's performance in the debate can speak for itself.

Meanwhile, Sam Seaborn, the Deputy White House Communications Director, goes to California to meet with Will Bailey, who is managing the congressional campaign of the deceased Democrat Horton Wilde against a seven-term Republican incumbent. This is the first appearance of Will Bailey on The West Wing. Sam tries to get Will to suspend Wilde's campaign at the request of the President, telling him that it's become "a national joke", but Will refuses. Sam goes to watch Will hold a press conference, where he defends Wilde and the campaign against the idea that a dead candidate should not be voted for. After the debate, Sam visits Will at a bar, and after further discussion, Will still refuses to back down from his campaign. Will tells Sam that Horton Wilde's widow, Kate Wilde, wants assurance that a Democrat will run for the seat should a special election occur, and after further discussion, Sam tells Will that he can tell Wilde that Sam grew up in Orange County, and would be willing to run for the seat should Wilde win.

Meanwhile, the Mastico, a ship in the Mediterranean Sea bound to the nation of Qumar, was stopped by the U.S. Navy on the suspicion that it was smuggling arms to a fictional terrorist group known as the Bahji. In an attempt to get the Qumar to turn the ship around, Leo McGarry summons the Qumari Ambassador to the United Nations, Ali Nassir, to the White House, along with Leo's lawyer, Jordon Kendall. The two argue over the death of Abdul Ibn Shareef, a Qumari cabinet minister secretly assassinated by the United States, because the Qumari government was spreading disinformation that Shareef was assassinated by the Israeli government. After Nassir attempts to de-escalate by telling Leo that he knows that Bartlet couldn't admit Israel's complicity during a close election, Leo laughs, responding that to win in a landslide, all Bartlet would have to do is "blow the Sultan's brains out in Times Square, then walk across the street to Nathan's and buy a hot dog". Leo tells the ambassador that he has to turn around the Mastico, and stop attempting to link Shareef's death to Israel.

== Reaction ==
=== The debate ===
The A.V. Club's Steve Heisler praised the debate in an article published in 2012, writing that the episode "finds not only incredible humor, but catharsis". Heisler praised Bartlet's strategy of attempting to persuade, rather than pander, contrasting it with Ritchie's "ten word" answers. He described the debate as between a "guy in desperate pursuit of simplicity vs. a guy who realizes the simplest thing to do is tell the truth." Heisler also praises Bartlet's dismissal of the debate format, choosing to articulate his ideas before the American people rather than engage with Ritchie's ten word answers. He also poked fun at the opening scene, musing that "Bartlet has decided to spend his precious minutes leading to the debate fucking with Toby."

The Atlantic also focuses on the debate and the difference between persuasion and pandering, although it is more critical of the way Bartlet and Ritchie are portrayed. Writing in two articles published in 2016, Megan Garber summarized the difference between the two candidates in the "Beer Question"—is a candidate able to connect with the American public on a personal level, instead of appearing smug and aloof? Would one be able to have a beer with them? However, Garber criticizes the way Ritchie is portrayed as unintelligent as well as folksy, arguing The West Wing is portraying Ritchie as a "walking... straw man, standing in for a great many of the stereotypes within which progressives are fond of packaging conservatives... He seems confused. He seems unprepared—not just for the debate, but for leadership. It is simply not a fair fight." Garber also writes that The West Wing, "for better or for worse", treats the debate as a kind of sporting event. She wraps up her pieces by saying that The West Wing still "makes a pretty good argument for choosing leaders according to their skills and their knowledge, rather than their charm", and criticizes the practice of candidates making personas for themselves.

=== Jed and Abbey Bartlet ===
Ben Travers, writing for IndieWire, briefly touched on "Game On" as part of a list of "15(ish) Episodes of ‘The West Wing’ To Binge View In Celebration of America", released in commemoration of Independence Day. In his review, Travers focused on Bartlet's relationship with his wife Abbey, commenting that the two "make quite the pair, both fitting a perfect mold created by Sorkin of opinionated, loving, and sly individuals joining together to better each other in ways both expected and unexpected." Travers argues that the "glory" of Bartlet beating Ritchie in the debate really belongs to Abbey, after her last-minute help in preparing Jed for the debate.

Heisler also examined the Bartlets' exchange before the debate, describing a scene where Jed Bartlet has to scramble to put on Josh's tie seconds before the debate as "the most frantic, claustrophobic scene in West Wing history". Heisler proceeds to poke fun at their relationship, writing that "If love isn’t a crazy woman waving the tie she just slashed from your chest, then, well, I don’t know what it is."

=== Sam Seaborn and Will Bailey ===
Heisler compares Will Bailey to a "young Jed Bartlet", full of unflinching idealism and a willingness to "stand up for the person who didn’t even realize he needed to be stood up for, but is awfully glad someone did." He further argues that Sam is at the bar with Will instead of celebrating with the White House senior staff, and volunteering to run in the special election, because he can recognize Bailey's merit as a campaign manager and person.
