= Martin v. Herzog =

- Court: New York Court of Appeals
- Full case name: Elizabeth Martin, as Administratrix of the Estate of William J. Martin, Deceased v. Samuel A. Herzog
- Decided: February 24, 1920
- Citation: 228 N Y. 164, 126 N.E. 814 (1920)

Court membership
- Judges sitting: Benjamin N. Cardozo, Frank H. Hiscock, Cuthbert W. Pound, Chester B. McLaughlin, William Shankland Andrews, Abram I. Elkus, John W. Hogan

Case opinions
- Decision by: Cardozo
- Dissent: Hogan

Keywords
- Negligence per se; Contributory negligence

Martin v. Herzog, Ct. of App. of N.Y., 228 N Y. 164, 126 N.E. 814 (1920), was a New York Court of Appeals case.

== Facts ==
Martin (P) (Note: Stands for Plaintiff) appealed the order of the Appellate Division that reversed a judgment entered after jury trial that found Herzog (D) (Note: Stands for Defendant) negligent and P blameless.

Martin (P) was driving his buggy on the night of August 21, 1915. P was killed in a collision between his buggy and Herzog's (D) car. It was dark when the accident occurred. P was driving without lights and D did not keep to the right of the center of the highway. P alleged that D was driving on the wrong side of the road. D claimed that P was contributorily negligent for driving without headlights as required under the law. In the body of the charge the trial judge said that the jury could consider the absence of light "in determining whether the plaintiff's intestate was guilty of contributory negligence in failing to have a light upon the buggy as provided by law. I do not mean to say that the absence of light necessarily makes him negligent, but it is a fact for your consideration." D requested a ruling that the absence of a light on the plaintiff's vehicle was "prima facie evidence of contributory negligence." This request was refused, and the jury were again instructed that they might consider the absence of lights as some evidence of negligence, but that it was not conclusive evidence. P then requested a charge that "the fact that the plaintiff's intestate was driving without a light is not negligence in itself," and to this the court acceded. The jury was instructed that they were at liberty to treat the omission of the lights either as innocent or as culpable. The jury gave the verdict to P. The Appellate Division reversed that verdict. P appealed to the Court of Appeals.

== Issue ==
Does a jury have the power to relax the duty that one traveler on the highway owes under a statute to another on the same highway? Is negligent conduct actionable by itself unless there is a showing that such conduct was the cause of the injuries incurred?

== Rule of law ==
The unexcused violation of a statutory duty is negligence per se and a jury does not have the power to relax the duty that one traveler on the highway owes under a statute to another on the same highway. Negligent conduct is not actionable by itself unless there is a showing that such conduct was the cause of the injuries incurred.

== Holding and decision ==
Judge Benjamin N. Cardozo gave the following judgment.

Does a jury have the power to relax the duty that one traveler on the highway owes under a statute to another on the same highway? No. Is negligent conduct actionable by itself unless there is a showing that such conduct was the cause of the injuries incurred? No. The unexcused omission of the statutory signals is more than some evidence of negligence. The unexcused violation of a statutory duty is negligence per se and a jury does not have the power to relax the duty that one traveler on the highway owes under a statute to another on the same highway. To omit, willfully or heedlessly, the safeguards prescribed by law for the benefit of another that he may be preserved in life or limb, is to fall short of the standard of diligence to which those who live in organized society are under a duty to conform. A rule less rigid has been applied where the one who complains of the omission is not a member of the class for whose protection the safeguard is designed. Some relaxation there has also been where the safeguard is prescribed by local ordinance, and not by statute. Courts have been reluctant to hold that the police regulations of boards and councils and other subordinate officials create rights of action beyond the specific penalties imposed. This has led them to say that the violation of a statute is negligence, and the violation of a like ordinance is only evidence of negligence. Here we have an instance of the admitted violation of a statute intended for the protection of travelers on the highway, of whom D at the time was one. The jurors were improperly instructed that they were at liberty in their discretion to treat the omission of lights either as innocent or as culpable. A defendant who travels without lights is not to pay damages for his fault unless the absence of lights is the cause of the disaster. To say that conduct is negligence is not to say that it is always contributory negligence. "Proof of negligence in the air, so to speak, will not do". To impose liability there still must be a showing of cause, proximate cause and damages. The failure of P's husband to use his headlights in accordance with the law is negligent conduct. The jurors have no discretion to treat such negligence differently or to ignore it. But at the same time there must still be a showing of the other elements of proof related to negligence to hold D liable. We conclude that evidence of a collision occurring more than one hour after sundown between a car and an unseen buggy, proceeding without lights is evidence from which a causal connection may be inferred between the collision and the lack of signals. If no other evidence is offered to break the causal connection, then there is contributory negligence. The order of the Appellate division should be affirmed.

== Dissent ==
Judge John W. Hogan read the following.

The evidence on behalf of P tended to establish that the automobile operated by D was approaching at a high rate of speed, and that the car seemed to be on P's side of the road. The lights upon the car illuminated the entire road. Where a duty is imposed by statute and a violation of the duty causes an injury, such violation is evidence of negligence as matter of law. The charge requested and denied in this case was in effect that a failure to have a light upon the intestate's wagon was as matter of law such negligence on his part as to defeat the cause of action irrespective of whether or not such negligence was the proximate cause of the injury. My conclusion is that we are substituting form and phrases for substance and diverging from the rule of causal connection.

== Legal analysis of Martin v. Herzog ==
Martin v. Herzog demonstrates the following principles of tort law:

1. Violation of a statute is negligence per se.

2. Under the doctrine of contributory negligence, the plaintiff's negligence is a complete defense. If the plaintiff's negligence was a cause of the injury, the plaintiff is barred from recovery.

In an opinion written by Benjamin N. Cardozo, the New York Court of Appeals affirmed the Appellate Division's ruling that the trial judge's jury instruction was erroneous. The trial judge had instructed the jury to consider the plaintiff's statutory violation when determining whether the plaintiff was contributorily negligent. The Court of Appeals held that the question of contributory negligence should not have been submitted to the jury. The plaintiff's violation of the statute was not mere evidence of negligence to be considered by the fact-finder; it was negligence as a matter of law.

The statute requiring highway travelers to have headlights codified the common law duty of one highway traveler to another. In failing to have headlights on his buggy, the plaintiff's intestate breached a duty of care to other highway travelers. (Cf. Tedla v. Ellman, where the plaintiffs' violation of a statute was not negligent because, in their particular situation, violating the statute was safer than adhering to it.) If a plaintiff's negligence per se is to be contributory negligence, it must be a cause of the injury. In Martin v. Herzog, the Court of Appeals found the plaintiff's traveling without lights an hour after sundown to be prima facie sufficient evidence of negligence contributing to the accident.

== Causation issues ==
A dissenting opinion by John W. Hogan countered that the plaintiff's negligence was not a contributing cause of the accident because the defendant was driving on the wrong side of the road. The dissenting opinion sets out the jury's findings of fact, which were affirmed by the Appellate Division: (A) the defendant was driving his car on the wrong side of the road; (B) the plaintiff's intestate was driving his buggy to the extreme right of the road; and (C) the highway was well lighted, such that witnesses could see the body of the plaintiff's intestate from forty feet away.

== See also ==
- US tort law
