= Ybarra v. Spangard =

- Supreme Court of California

Decided December 27, 1944
- Full case name: Joseph Roman Ybarra v. Lawrence C. Spangard et al.
- Citation(s): 25 Cal.2d 486 (1944)

Case history
- Prior history: Appeal from judgment of nonsuit to all defendants
- Subsequent history: none

Holding
- When a plaintiff receives unusual injuries while unconscious and in the course medical treatment, all those defendants who had control over his body may properly be called upon to explain their conduct.

Court membership
- Chief Justice: Phil S. Gibson
- Associate Justices: John W. Shenk, Douglas L. Edmonds, Jesse W. Carter, B. Rey Schauer, Jesse W. Curtis

Case opinions
- Majority: Gibson, joined by Shenk, Curtis, Carter, Schauer, Edmonds

Ybarra v. Spangard was a leading case in California discussing the exclusive control element of res ipsa loquitur. "Where a plaintiff receives unusual injuries while unconscious and in the course of medical treatment, all those defendants who had any control over his body or the instrumentalities which might have caused the injuries may properly be called upon to meet the inference of negligence by giving an explanation of their conduct."

The contrary position would bar the application of res ipsa loquitur when there is no showing that the cause of the injury was the act of any particular defendant or instrumentality.

== Facts ==
Joseph Ybarra consulted defendant Dr. Tilley, who diagnosed appendicitis and made preparations for surgery. Ybarra entered the hospital, was given a hypodermic injection, slept, and was awakened. He was wheeled into the operating room, where his body was pulled to the head of the table. His back was laid against two hard objects at the top of his shoulders, about an inch from his neck. Prior to the operation, he had never had any pain in his arm or shoulder, but afterward, he felt a sharp pain in his neck near the shoulder and was unable to rotate or lift his arm.

== Legal issue ==
When a plaintiff receives unusual injuries and is unconscious during medical treatment, can res ipsa loquitur establish the negligence of all the defendants who had control over his body and might have caused his injuries?

== Holding ==
Yes, res ipsa loquitur can prove that the instrument causing the injury was under the exclusive control of the defendant, and the injury does not ordinarily happen unless there was negligence. All persons and instrumentalities exercising control over a person are liable for any unnecessary harm that results.

Every defendant who had control over the plaintiff's body, for any period, was bound to exercise ordinary care to see that no unnecessary harm came to him, and all would be liable for failure. The injury was distinctly a part of his body not subject for treatment or even within the area covered by the operation. Unless the doctors and nurses in attendance voluntarily chose to disclose the identity of the negligent person, liability would be impossible to determine and absolute liability would be the result, irrespective of negligence.
