= Bonus pater familias =

In Roman law, the term bonus pater familias ("good family father") refers to a standard of care, analogous to that of the reasonable man in the common law.

== Modern rules ==
=== Spain ===
In Spanish law, the term used is a direct translation ("un buen padre de familia"), and used in the Spanish Código Civil. It is also used in Latin American countries.

=== Portugal ===
In Portuguese law the term is also mentioned in the Civil Code, in its direct translation ("um bom pai de família").

=== Italy ===
In Italian law, the term is used in a direct translation ("diligenza del buon padre di famiglia").

=== France and Canada ===
Similar is the French language expression bon père de famille, used in a sense similar to "reasonably cautious person." For example, in the case of Fales v. Canada Permanent Trust Co., [1977] 2 SCR 302, at p. 315, the Supreme Court of Canada described the standard of care and diligence expected of the manager of a trust as being "ceux qu’un bon père de famille apporte à l’administration de ses propres affaires". In the English version of the decision, this concept was translated as "that of a man of ordinary prudence in managing his own affairs."
