= Puerto Raúl Marín Balmaceda =

- Locality
- Interactive map of Puerto Raúl Marín Balmaceda
- Country: Chile
- Region: Aysén Region
- Province: Aysén Province
- Commune: Cisnes

Puerto Raúl Marín Balmaceda is a locality in the zona austral of Chile, located in the commune of Cisnes, Región de Aysén. It is located on Los Leones Island in the Palena River delta, in the southeast of the Gulf of Corcovado, and it is the oldest in the Aysén region of Patagonia. Per the census results of 2017, it has a population of 239 inhabitants.

== History ==
In 1888, about twenty families from Chiloé arrived at the mouth of the Palena River to settle on Los Leones Island. Consequently, in January 1889, the government of José Manuel Balmaceda established the Palena colony (Lower Palena), under the jurisdiction of the Llanquihue Intendency at that time. This marked the beginning of the first formal colonization process in the Aysén region of Patagonia.

In 1975 Puerto Raúl Marín Balmaceda joined the Aysén Region and in 1979 it was integrated into the commune of Cisnes.
