= Hand formula =

Legal rationale involving risks, losses and obligations

The Hand formula, also known as the Hand rule, calculus of negligence, or BPL formula, is a conceptual formula created by United States Judge Learned Hand, which describes a process for determining whether a legal duty of care has been breached (constituting negligence). The original description of the calculus was in United States v. Carroll Towing Co., in which an improperly secured barge had drifted away from a pier and caused damage to several other boats.

== Articulation of the rule ==
Hand stated:

[T]he owner's duty, as in other similar situations, to provide against resulting injuries is a function of three variables: (1) The probability that she will break away; (2) the gravity of the resulting injury, if she does; (3) the burden of adequate precautions.

This relationship has been formalized by the law and economics school as such: an act is in breach of the duty of care if:

$$PL>B$$

where B is the cost (burden) of taking precautions, and P is the probability of loss (L). L is the gravity of loss. The product of P x L must be a greater amount than B to create a duty of due care for the defendant.

== Rationale ==
The calculus of negligence is based on the Coase theorem, which postulates the economic efficiency of an economic allocation or outcome in the presence of externalities. The tort system acts as if, before the injury or damage, a contract had been made between the parties under the assumption that a rational, cost-minimizing individual will not spend money on taking precautions if those precautions are more expensive than the costs of the harm that they prevent. In other words, rather than spending money on safety, the individual will simply allow harm to occur and pay for the costs of that harm, because that will be more cost-efficient than taking precautions. This represents cases where B is greater than PL.

If the harm could be avoided for less than the cost of the harm (B is less than PL), then the individual should take the precautions, rather than allowing the harm to occur. If precautions were not taken, we find that a legal duty of care has been breached, and we impose liability on the individual to pay for the harm.

This approach, in theory, leads to an optimal allocation of resources; where harm can be cheaply avoided, the legal system requires precautions. Where precautions are prohibitively expensive, it does not. In marginal-cost terms, we require individuals to invest one unit of precautions up until the point that those precautions prevent exactly one unit of harm, and no less.

=== Mathematical rationale ===
The Hand formula attempts to formalize the intuitive notion that when the expected loss $\mathbb{E}(L)$ exceeds the cost of taking precautions, the duty of care has been breached:
$$\mathbb{E}(L) > B$$
To assess the expected loss, statistical methods, such as regression analysis, may be used. A common metric for quantifying losses in the case of work accidents is the present value of lost future earnings and medical costs associated with the accident. In the case when the probability of loss is assumed to be a single number $P$, and $L$ is the loss from the event occurring, the familiar form of the Hand formula is recovered. More generally, for continuous outcomes the Hand formula takes form:
$$\int_{\Omega} Lf(L)dL > B$$
where $\Omega$ is the domain for losses and $f(L)$ is the probability density function of losses. Assuming that losses are positive, common choices for loss distributions include the gamma, lognormal, and Weibull distributions.

== Criticism ==
Critics point out that term "gravity of loss (L)" is vague, and could entail a wide variety of damages, from a scratched fender to several dead victims. Even then, on top of that, how exactly a juror should determine a value for such a loss is abstract in itself. The speculative nature of the rule also seizes upon how a juror should determine the probability of loss (P).

Additionally, the rule fails to account for possible alternatives, whether it be the use of alternate methods to reach the same outcome, or abandoning the risky activity altogether.

Research indicates that the way laypeople (like jurors) judge negligence is often inconsistent with Hand Formula analysis, even when they have complete information about B, P, and L. People tend to give more weight to PL, and less weight to B, than the Hand Formula prescribes, and when available, they rely more heavily on information about custom than information about cost-justification under the formula.

Human teams estimating risk need to guard against judgment errors, cf. absolute probability judgement.

== Use in practice ==
In the U.S., juries, with guidance from the court, decide what particular acts or omissions constitute negligence, so a reference to the standard of ordinary care removes the need to discuss this conceptual formula. Juries are not told this formula but essentially use their common sense to decide what an ordinarily careful person would have done under the circumstances. The Hand formula has less practical value for the lay researcher seeking to understand how the courts actually determine negligence cases in the United States than for the jury instructions used by the courts in the individual states.

Outside legal proceedings, this formula is the core premise of insurance, risk management, quality assurance, information security and privacy practices. It factors into due care and due diligence decisions in business risk. Restrictions exist in the cases where the loss applies to human life or the probability of adverse finding in court cases. One famous case of abuse by industry in recent years related to the Ford Pinto.

Quality assurance techniques extend the use of probability and loss to include uncertainty bounds in each quantity and possible interactions between uncertainty in probability and impact for two purposes. First, to more accurately model customer acceptance and process reliability to produce wanted outcomes. Second, to seek cost effective factors either up or down stream of the event that produce better results at sustainably reduced costs. Example, simply providing a protective rail near a cliff also includes quality manufacture features of the rail as part of the solution. Reasonable signs warning of the risk before persons reach the cliff may actually be more effective in reducing fatalities than the rail itself.

== Australia ==
In Australia, the calculus of negligence is a normative judgement with no formula or rule.

In New South Wales, the test is how a reasonable person (or other standard of care) would respond to the risk in the circumstances considering the 'probability that the harm would occur if care were not taken' and, 'the likely seriousness of the harm', 'the burden of taking precautions to avoid the risk of harm', and the 'social utility of the activity that creates the risk of harm'. State and Territory legislatures require that the social utility of the activity that creates the risk of harm be taken into account in determining whether or not a reasonable person would have taken precautions against that risk of harm. For example, in Haris v Bulldogs Rugby League Club Limited the court considered the social utility of holding football matches when determining whether a football club took sufficient precautions to protect spectators from the risk of being struck by fireworks set off as part of the entertainment during a game.
