= Reasonable person =

Hypothetical person of legal fiction

In law, a reasonable person or reasonable man is a hypothetical person whose character and care conduct, under any common set of facts, is decided through reasoning of good practice or policy. It is a legal fiction crafted by the courts and communicated through case law and jury instructions. In some practices, for circumstances arising from an uncommon set of facts, this person represents a composite of a relevant community's judgment as to how a typical member of that community should behave in situations that might pose a threat of harm (through action or inaction) to the public.

The reasonable person is used as a tool to standardize, teach law students, or explain the law to a jury. The reasonable person belongs to a family of hypothetical figures in law including: the "right-thinking member of society", the "officious bystander", the "reasonable parent", the "reasonable landlord", the "fair-minded and informed observer", the "person having ordinary skill in the art" in patent law.

The "reasonable person" construct can be found applied in many areas of the law. The standard performs a crucial role in determining negligence in both criminal law—that is, criminal negligence—and tort law. The standard is also used in contract law, to determine contractual intent, or (when there is a duty of care) whether there has been a breach of the standard of care. The intent of a party can be determined by examining the understanding of a reasonable person, after consideration is given to all relevant circumstances of the case including the negotiations, any practices the parties have established between themselves, usages and any subsequent conduct of the parties. During the Nuremberg Trials, Sir David Maxwell Fyfe introduced the standard of the reasonable person to international law. Nowadays known as the standard of the 'reasonable military commander', international courts use it to assess the conduct of military officers in times of war.

== Definition ==
While there is a loose consensus on its meaning in black letter law, there is no accepted technical definition, and the "reasonable person" is an emergent concept of common law. The reasonable person is not an average person or a typical person, leading to difficulties in applying the concept in some criminal cases, especially in regard to the partial defence of provocation. Most recently, Valentin Jeutner has argued that it matters less whether the reasonable person is reasonable, officious or diligent but rather that the most important characteristic of the reasonable person is that they are another person. As with legal fiction in general, it is somewhat susceptible to ad hoc manipulation or transformation. Strictly according to the fiction, it is misconceived for a party to seek evidence from actual people to establish how someone would have acted or what he would have foreseen. However, changes in the standard may be "learned" by high courts over time if there is a compelling consensus of public opinion.

The standard also holds that each person owes a duty to behave as a reasonable person would under the same or similar circumstances. While the specific circumstances of each case will require varying kinds of conduct and degrees of care, the reasonable person standard undergoes no variation itself. The standard does not exist independently of other circumstances within a case that could affect an individual's judgement. In cases resulting in judgment notwithstanding verdict, a vetted jury's composite judgment can be deemed beyond that of the reasonable person, and thus overruled.

== History ==
Ancient predecessors of the reasonable person include the bonus pater familias (the good family father) of ancient Rome, the bonus vir (the good man) and spoudaios (the earnest person) in ancient Greece as well as the geru maa (the silent person) in ancient Egypt. The "reasonable man" appeared in Richard Hooker's defence of conservatism in religion, the Laws of Ecclesiastical Polity (1594-7), where he preferred Papists to Turks and accepted the opinions of religious experts when there was no reason to dissent.

In 1835, Adolphe Quetelet detailed the characteristics of l'homme moyen (French, "average man"). His work is translated into English several ways. As a result, some authors pick "average man", "common man", "reasonable man", or stick to the original "l'homme moyen". Quetelet was a Belgian astronomer, mathematician, statistician and sociologist. He documented the physical characteristics of man on a statistical basis and discussed man's motivations when acting in society.

In 1837, the "reasonable person" appears in the English case of Vaughan v. Menlove (1837). In Menlove, the defendant had stacked hay on his rental property in a manner prone to spontaneous ignition. After he had been repeatedly warned over the course of five weeks, the hay ignited and burned the defendant's barns and stable and then spread to the landlord's two cottages on the adjacent property. Menlove's attorney admitted his client's "misfortune of not possessing the highest order of intelligence," arguing that negligence should only be found if the jury decided Menlove had not acted with "bona fide [and] to the best of his [own] judgment."

The Menlove court disagreed, reasoning that such a standard would be too subjective, instead preferring to set an objective standard for adjudicating cases:

The care taken by a prudent man has always been the rule laid down; and as to the supposed difficulty of applying it, a jury has always been able to say, whether, taking that rule as their guide, there has been negligence on the occasion in question. Instead, therefore, of saying that the liability for negligence should be co-extensive with the judgment of each individual, which would be as variable as the length of the foot of each individual, we ought rather to adhere to the rule which requires in all cases a regard to caution such as a man of ordinary prudence would observe. That was, in substance, the criterion presented to the jury in this case and, therefore, the present rule must be discharged.

English courts upheld the standard again nearly 20 years later in Blyth v. Company Proprietors of the Birmingham Water Works. In the case, Sir Edward Hall Alderson held:

Negligence is the omission to do something which a reasonable man, guided upon those considerations which ordinarily regulate the conduct of human affairs, would do, or doing something which a prudent and reasonable man would not do.

== Rationale ==
American jurist Oliver Wendell Holmes Jr. explained the theory behind the reasonable person standard as stemming from the impossibility of "measuring a man's powers and limitations." Individual, personal quirks inadvertently injuring the persons or property of others are no less damaging than intentional acts. For society to function, "a certain average of conduct, a sacrifice of individual peculiarities going beyond a certain point, is necessary to the general welfare." Thus, a reasonable application of the law is sought, compatible with planning, working, or getting along with others. As such, "his neighbors accordingly require him, at his proper peril, to come up to their standard, and the courts which they establish decline to take his personal equation into account." He heralded the reasonable person as a legal fiction whose care conduct under any common set of facts, is chosen—or "learned" permitting there is a compelling consensus of public opinion—by the courts.

The reasonable person standard, contrary to popular conception, is intentionally distinct from that of the "average person," who is not necessarily guaranteed to always be reasonable. The reasonable person will weigh all of the following factors before acting:

- the foreseeable risk of harm his actions create versus the utility of his actions;
- the extent of the risk so created;
- the likelihood such risk will actually cause harm to others;
- any alternatives of lesser risk, and the costs of those alternatives.

Taking such actions requires the reasonable person to be appropriately informed, capable, aware of the law, and fair-minded. Such a person might do something extraordinary in certain circumstances, but whatever that person does or thinks, it is always reasonable.

The reasonable person has been called an "excellent but odious character."

He is an ideal, a standard, the embodiment of all those qualities which we demand of the good citizen ... [he] invariably looks where he is going, ... is careful to examine the immediate foreground before he executes a leap or bound; ... neither stargazes nor is lost in meditation when approaching trapdoors or the margins of a dock; ... never mounts a moving [bus] and does not alight from any car while the train is in motion, ... uses nothing except in moderation, and even flogs his child in meditating only on the golden mean.

English legal scholar Percy Henry Winfield summarized much of the literature by observing that:

[H]e has not the courage of Achilles, the wisdom of Ulysses or the strength of Hercules, nor has he the prophetic vision of a clairvoyant. He will not anticipate folly in all its forms but he never puts out of consideration the teachings of experience and so will guard against negligence of others when experience shows such negligence to be common. He is a reasonable man but not a perfect citizen, nor a "paragon of circumspection. ..."

== Hand Rule ==
Under United States common law, a well known—though nonbinding—test for determining how a reasonable person might weigh the criteria listed above was set down in United States v. Carroll Towing Co. in 1947 by Learned Hand, the Chief Judge of the U.S. Court of Appeals for the Second Circuit.

The case concerned a barge which had broken her mooring with the dock. Writing for the court, Hand said:

[T]he owner's duty, as in other similar situations, to provide against resulting injuries is a function of three variables: (1) The probability that she will break away; (2) the gravity of the resulting injury, if she does; (3) the burden of adequate precautions.

While the test offered by Hand does not encompass all the criteria available above, juries in a negligence case might well still be instructed to take the other factors into consideration in determining whether the defendant was negligent.

Research indicates that, even when complete Hand Rule information is available, ordinary people (like jurors) typically do not consider the Hand Rule variables in the manner the rule prescribes. They give more weight to the probability and gravity of harm than to the burden of adequate precautions, and they rely on other considerations like custom more heavily than they rely on the Hand Rule.

The Sedona Conference issued its Commentary on a Reasonable Security Test to advance the Hand Rule for a cybersecurity context.The commentary adds three important articulations to the Hand Rule; a person is reasonable if no alternative safeguard would have provided an added benefit that was greater than the added burden, the utility of the risk should be considered as a factor in the calculation (as either a cost or a benefit, depending on the situation), and both qualitative and quantitative factors may be used in the test.

== Personal circumstances ==
The legal fiction of the reasonable person is an ideal, as nobody is perfect. Everyone has limitations on their personal capacity, both mental and physical, on their available resources and on their level of knowledge either of a situation or of facts in general, so the standard requires only that people act similarly to how "a reasonable person under the circumstances" would, as if their limitations were themselves circumstances. As such, courts require that the reasonable person be viewed as having the same limitations as the defendant.

For example, a disabled defendant is held to a standard that represents how a reasonable person with that same disability would act. This is no excuse for poor judgment, or trying to act beyond one's abilities. Were it so, there would be as many standards as there were defendants; and courts would spend innumerable hours, and the parties much more money, on determining that particular defendant's reasonableness, character, and intelligence.

By using the reasonable person standard, courts instead use an objective tool and avoid such subjective evaluations. The result is a standard that allows the law to behave in a uniform, foreseeable, and neutral manner when attempting to determine liability.

=== Children ===
One broad allowance made to the reasonable person standard is for children. The standard here requires that a child act in a similar manner to how a "reasonable person of like age, intelligence, and experience under like circumstances" would act. In many common law systems, children under the age of 6 or 7 are typically exempt from any liability, whether civil or criminal, as they are deemed to be unable to understand the risk involved in their actions. This is called the defense of infancy: in Latin, doli incapax. In some jurisdictions, one of the exceptions to these allowances concern children engaged in what is primarily considered to be high-risk adult activity, such as operating a motor vehicle, and in some jurisdictions, children can also be "tried as an adult" for serious crimes, such as murder, which causes the court to disregard the defendant's age.

=== Mentally ill ===
The reasonable person standard makes no allowance for the mentally ill. Such a refusal goes back to the standard set in Menlove, where Menlove's attorney argued for the subjective standard. In the 170 years since, the law has kept to the legal judgment of having only the single, objective standard. Such judicial adherence sends a message that the mentally ill would do better to refrain from taking risk-creating actions, unless they exercise a heightened degree of self-restraint and precaution, if they intend to avoid liability.

Generally, the courts have reasoned that by not accepting mental illness as a bar to recovery, a potentially liable third party, such as a caregiver, will be more likely to protect the public. The courts have also stated the reason that members of the public are unable to identify a mentally ill person, as they can a child or someone with a physical disability.

=== Professionals ===
When a person attempts a skilful act, the "reasonable person under the circumstances" test is elevated to a standard of whether the person acted how a "reasonable professional under the circumstances" would have, whether or not that person is actually a professional, has training, or has experience. Other factors also become relevant, such as the degree to which a professional is educated (i.e., whether a specialist within the specific field, or just a general practitioner of the trade), and customary practices and general procedures of similar professionals. However, such other relevant factors are never dispositive.

Some professions may maintain a custom or practice long after a better method has become available. The new practices, though less risky, may be entirely ignored. In such cases, the practitioner may very well have acted unreasonably despite following custom or general practices.

==== Medical professionals ====
In healthcare, plaintiffs must prove via expert testimony the standard of medical care owed and a departure from that standard. The only exception to the requirement of expert testimony is where the departure from accepted medical practices was so egregious that a layperson can readily recognize the departure.

However, controversial medical practices can be deemed reasonable when followed by a respected and reputable minority of the medical field, or where the medical profession cannot agree over which practices are best.

==== Armed professionals ====
The "reasonable officer" standard is a method often applied to law enforcement and other armed professions to help determine if a use of force was excessive. The test is whether an appropriately trained professional, knowing what the officer knew at the time and following guidelines (such as a force continuum), would have used the same level of force or higher. If the level of force is justified, the quantity of force is usually presumed to have been necessary unless there are other factors. For example, if a trained police officer was justified in fatally shooting a suspect, the number of shots is presumed to have been necessary barring other factors, such as a reckless disregard of others' safety or that additional force was used when the suspect was no longer a threat.

=== Inexperience ===
When anyone undertakes a skilful task that creates a risk to others, that person is held to the minimum standard of how a reasonable person experienced in that task would act, regardless of their actual level of experience.

== External circumstances ==
Factors beyond the defendant's control are always relevant. Additionally, so is the context within which each action is made. Many things affect how a person acts: individual perceptions, knowledge, the weather, etc. The standard of care required depends on the circumstances, but is always that which is reasonable.

While community customs may be relied upon to indicate what kind of action is expected in the circumstances, these are not themselves conclusive of what a reasonable person would do.

It is precisely for this wide-ranging variety of possible facts that the reasonable person standard is so broad (and often confusing and difficult to apply). However, a few general areas of relevant circumstances rise above the others.

=== Emergency doctrine ===
Allowing for circumstances under which a person must act urgently is important to prevent hindsight bias by the trier of fact. A reasonable person may not always act as they would when more relaxed. It is fair that actions be judged in light of any exigent conditions that could have affected how the defendant acted.

=== Available resources ===
People must make do with what they have or can get. Such circumstances are relevant to any determination of whether the defendant acted reasonably. Where resources are scarce, some actions may be reasonable that would not be were there plenty.

=== Negligence per se ===
Because a reasonable person is objectively presumed to know the law, noncompliance with a local safety statute may also constitute negligence. The related doctrine of negligence per se addresses the circumstances under which the law of negligence can become an implied cause of action for breaching a statutory standard of care. Conversely, minimal compliance with a safety statute does not always absolve a defendant if the trier of fact determines that a reasonable person would have taken actions beyond and in excess of what the statute requires. The trier of fact can deem the defendant's duty of care met by finding that the statute's standard itself is reasonable and the defendant acted in accordance with what it statute contemplated.

== Reasonable bystander ==
For common law contracts, disputes over contract formation are subjected to what is known as the objective test of assent in order to determine whether a contract exists. This standard is also known as the officious bystander, reasonable bystander, reasonable third party, or reasonable person in the position of the party. This is in contrast to the subjective test employed in most civil law jurisdictions. The test stems from attempts to balance the competing interests of the judicial policies of assent and of reliability. The former holds that no person ought to be contractually obligated if they did not consent to such an agreement; the latter holds that if no person can rely on actions or words demonstrating consent, then the whole system of commercial exchange will ultimately collapse.

Prior to the 19th century, courts used a test of subjective evaluation; that is, the trier of fact determined each party's understanding. If both parties were of the same mind and understanding on matters, then assent was manifested and the contract was valid. Between the 19th and 20th centuries, the courts shifted toward the objectivist test, reasoning that subjective testimony was often unreliable and self-serving.

From those opposite principles, modern law has found its way to a rough middle ground, though it still shows a strong bias toward the objective test. Promises and agreements are reached through manifestations of consent, and parties are liable for actions that deliberately manifest such consent; however, evidence of either party's state of mind can be used to determine the context of the manifestation if the evidence is reliable and compatible with the manifestation in question, though such evidence is typically given very little weight.

Another circumstance where the reasonable bystander test is used occurs when one party has inadvertently misstated the terms of the contract, and the other party sues to enforce those terms: if it would have been clear to a reasonable bystander that a mistake had been made, then the contract is voidable by the party who made the error; otherwise, the contract is binding.

== Reasonable person standard for victims ==
=== Reasonable woman ===
==== Sexual harassment ====
A variant of the reasonable person can be found in sexual harassment law as the reasonable woman standard. The variation recognizes a difference between men and women regarding the effect of unwanted interaction with a sexual tone. As women have historically been more vulnerable to rape and sex-related violence than have men, some courts believe that the proper perspective for evaluating a claim of sexual harassment is that of the reasonable woman. Notably, Justice Antonin Scalia held that women did not have constitutional protection from discrimination under the fourteenth amendment equal protection clause, where by extension of logic, held the "reasonable woman" standard to be of moot value. However, such has not been the majority opinion of the court.

==== Satire ====
Though the use of the reasonable woman standard has gained traction in some areas of the law, the standard has not escaped the crosshairs of humorists. In 1924, legal humorist A. P. Herbert considered the concept of the reasonable man at length in the fictional case of "Fardell v. Potts." In Herbert's fictional account, the judge addressed the lack of a reasonable woman standard in the common law, and ultimately concluded that "a reasonable woman does not exist."

=== L'homme moyen sensuel ===
The concept of l'homme moyen sensuel does not speak of a reasonable person's ability, actions, or understandings. Rather it refers to the response of a reasonable person when presented with some form of information either by image or sound, or upon reading a book or magazine. A well-known application of the concept is Judge John M. Woolsey's lifting of the ban on the book Ulysses by James Joyce. That ruling contemplated the effect the book would have upon a reasonable person of reasonable sensibility. Similarly, when the publisher of Howl and Other Poems was charged in California with publishing an obscene book, the concept of l'homme moyen sensuel influenced the court's finding of innocence. It was nearly two decades after Woolsey that the US Supreme Court set down the standard by which materials, when viewed by l'homme moyen sensuel, were judged either obscene or not. Generally, it has been l'homme moyen sensuel that has dictated what is and is not obscene or pornographic in books, movies, pictures, and now the Internet for at least the past 100 years.

=== Qualifications ===
Very often, for instance, in the case of noise ordinances, the enforcement of the law is only for the purpose of protecting the right of a "reasonable person of normal sensitivity".

== See also ==
- A moron in a hurry
- Bonus pater familias
- Casuistry
- Man on the Clapham omnibus
- Objective historian
- Person having ordinary skill in the art
- Prudent man rule
- Reasonability
- Reasonable doubt
- Reasonable suspicion
- Subjective and objective standard of reasonableness
- Standard of care in English law
