= Vaughan v Menlove =

Tort law case

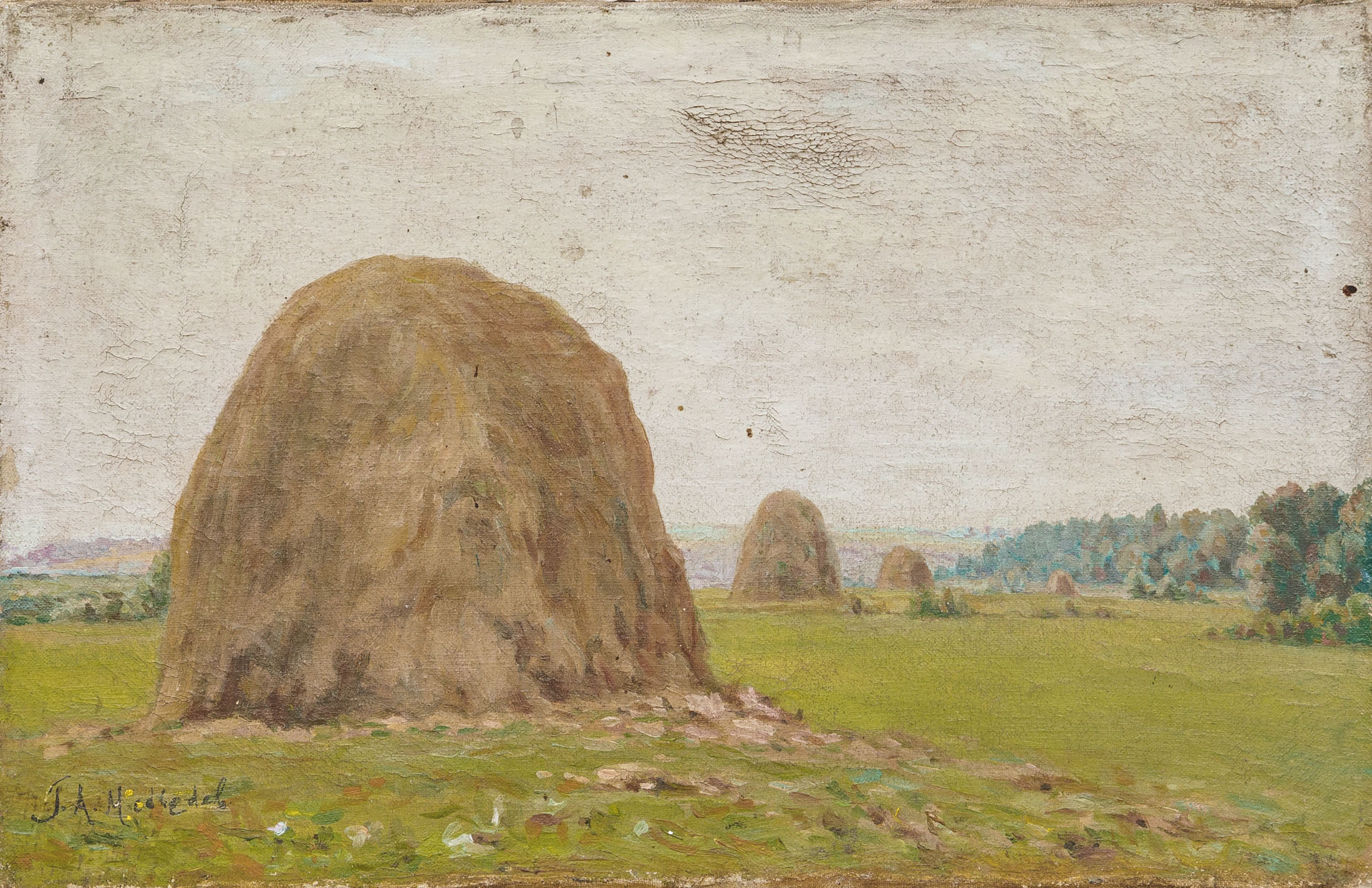
- Court: Court of Common Pleas
- Citation: (1837) 3 Bing NC 468, 132 ER 490 (CP)

Court membership
- Judges sitting: Tindal CJ, Park J and Vaughan J

Keywords
- Reasonable person

Vaughan v Menlove (1837) 132 ER 490 (CP) is a leading English tort law case that first introduced the concept of the reasonable person in law.

== Facts ==
As hay decomposes, heat is generated. In the absence of ventilation, the increased heat can cause a fire.

The defendant built a hay rick (or haystack) near the boundary of his land which bordered the plaintiff's land. The defendant's hay rick had been built with a precautionary "chimney" to prevent the hay from spontaneously igniting, but it ignited anyway. He had been warned several times over a period of five weeks that the manner in which he built the hay rick was dangerous, but he said "he would chance it." Consequently, the hay ignited and spread to the plaintiff's land, burning down two of the plaintiff's cottages.

== Judgment ==
=== Trial ===
At trial the judge instructed the jury to consider whether the fire had been caused by gross negligence on the part of the defendant, and stated the defendant "was [duty] bound to proceed with such reasonable caution as a prudent man would have exercised under such circumstances." The jury found the defendant negligent.

=== Appeal ===
The defendant appealed the trial court's verdict, arguing the jury should have instead been instructed to consider "whether he acted bona fide to the best of his judgment; if he had, he ought not to be responsible for the misfortune of not possessing the highest order of intelligence."

The court, composed of Tindal CJ, Park J and Vaughan J, rejected the defendant's argument, holding that the lower court's jury instructions were correct and therefore affirming the verdict. Tindal CJ wrote that there is:

... a rule of law which says you must so enjoy your own property as not to injure that of another, and according to that rule the defendant is liable for the consequence of his own neglect; and though the defendant did not himself light the fire, yet mediately, he is as much the cause of it as if he had himself put a candle to the rick, for it is well known that hay will ferment and take fire if it be not carefully stacked.

The court stated that to judge,

whether the Defendant had acted honestly and bona fide to the best of his own judgment . . . would leave so vague a line as to afford no rule at all... [Because the judgments of individuals are...] as variable as the length of the foot of each... we ought rather to adhere to the rule which requires in all cases a regard to caution such as a man of ordinary prudence would observe.

The court indicated that although this was a case of first impression, the "man of ordinary prudence" standard was supported by a similar duty of care applied in cases of bailment, in which liability was imposed only for negligence relative to that standard. The court also viewed the "reasonable man" standard as supported by the long-settled principle that persons must use their property so as not to harm that of others (sic utere tuo ut alienum non laedas). Finally, the court held that the question of whether the defendant was liable because of negligence in violation of the reasonable person standard was a proper question for the jury ("The care taken by a prudent man has always been the rule laid down; and as to the supposed difficulty of applying it, a jury has always been able to say, whether, taking that rule as their guide, there has been negligence...").

== Significance ==
The defense counsel had argued that there was no duty imposed on the defendant to be responsible for the exercise of any given degree of care, in contrast to the duty of care imposed on common carriers and bailees, or under an implied contract. This case was decided during a transitional period in the history of the common law rule on negligence and liability. Until the mid- to late 19th century in the United States and England, there was no settled standard for tort liability. Courts in the early 19th century often found a negligence requirement for liability to exist only for common carriers or bailees. English and U.S. courts later began to move toward a standard of negligence based on a universal duty of care in light of the "reasonable person" test.

Vaughan v. Menlove is often cited as the seminal case which introduced the “reasonable person” test not only to the tort law, but to jurisprudence generally. This assertion is false. A 2019 law review article discovered that the misidentification of Vaughan v. Menlove as the birthplace of the “reasonable man of ordinary prudence” originated from a typographical error in an influential tort treatise, Prosser’s Law of Torts (4th edition), which erroneously cites the date of the case as “1738” rather than “1837.” Although no cases earlier than 1738 were found to apply a reasonable person standard, there exist several cases prior to 1837 applying the reasonable person standard. The error was corrected after the fourth edition of Prosser’s treatise, however subsequent legal scholars have continued to repeat the claim that Vaughan v. Menlove is where the “reasonable person” concept first appeared in the law, as the misattribution propagates indirectly through a citation network.

== See also ==
- English tort law
