= Tedla v. Ellman =

Court case in the United States

- Court: New York Court of Appeals
- Decided: 1939
- Citation: 280 N.Y. 124, 19 N.E. 2d 987

Case history
- Prior history: Tedla v. Ellman, 253 App. Div. 764 Bachek v. Ellman, 253 App. Div. 764, affirmed

Court membership
- Judges sitting: Irving Lehman, Frederick E. Crane, Irving G. Hubbs, Harlan Watson Rippey, John T. Loughran, John F. O’Brien, Edward R. Finch

Case opinions
- Majority: Lehman, joined by Crane, Hubbs, Loughran, and Rippey
- Dissent: O’Brien, joined by Finch

Tedla v. Ellman (280 N.Y. 124, 19 N.E. 2d 987) was a 1939 New York Court of Appeals case that was influential in establishing the bounds of the negligence per se doctrine. Ordinarily, a statutory violation automatically constitutes negligence. However, the court, in an opinion written by Irving Lehman, instead held that because this violation occurred in a situation not anticipated by the drafters of the statute and the violation was in keeping with the spirit of the statute, it did not constitute negligence.

== Facts ==
Anna Tedla and her brother, John Bachek (plaintiffs), were struck by a passing automobile, operated by the defendant, Ellman. Tedla was injured and Bachek was killed. Bachek was a deaf-mute. The plaintiff had engaged in collecting and selling junk. They picked up junk at the incinerator of the village of Islip, New York. At the time of the accident, plaintiffs were walking along and wheeling baby carriages containing junk and wood. It was about six o'clock on a Sunday evening in December. Bachek was carrying a lighted lantern. The jury found that the accident was due solely to the negligence of the operator of the automobile.
The place of the accident consisted of two roadways, separated by a grass plot. There were no footpaths along the highway and the center grass plot was soft, and so it was both necessary and lawful for Tedla and Bachek with their baby carriage to use the roadway under such circumstances. The Vehicle and Traffic Law (Cons. Laws, ch. 71) dictated that pedestrians should walk on the left, not the right of the roadway: "Pedestrians walking or remaining on the paved portion, or traveled part of a roadway shall be subject to, and comply with, the rules governing vehicles, with respect to meeting and turning out, except that such pedestrians shall keep to the left of the center line thereof, and turn to their left instead of right side thereof, so as to permit all vehicles passing them in either direction to pass on their right." Tedla and Bachek were proceeding in an easterly direction on the east-bound, right-hand roadway, and were therefore not obeying this statute.

== Procedural history ==
The defendant moved to dismiss the complaint on the ground, among others, that violation of the statutory rule (walking on the wrong side of the roadway) constitutes contributory negligence as a matter of law. The trial judge left to the jury the question whether failure to observe the statutory rule was a proximate cause of the accident. The trial judge found for the plaintiff, which the appellate division affirmed. On this appeal, the defendant argues the pedestrians were contributorily negligent as a matter of law for violating the statute.

Ellman appealed an order from the Appellate Division affirming a judgment entered upon a verdict in favor of Tedla in their action for negligence.

== Issue and holding ==
The court noted that the statutory requirement for pedestrians to walk on the left was intended to maintain their safety. In this instance, the west-bound roadway was very busy, while the east-bound was not, and so it was only natural for Tedla and her brother to walk on the east-bound roadway. In effect, had they obeyed the letter of the statue, and walked on the left, they would have disobeyed its spirit, by putting themselves at greater risk. This was not the aim of the statute. Therefore, such statutes should not be regarded as inflexible, or allowed to over-rule common-law obligations. For this reason, failure to observe the letter of the statute did not automatically constitute negligence. Thus the court found in favor of Tedla.
