= National Care Standards (Scotland) =

The National Care Standards are a set of standards for care services in Scotland.

They were set up by the Scottish Government, as required by the Regulation of Care (Scotland) Act 2001. The standards were devised after consultation with service providers, service users, various expert bodies and individuals, and the public. The standards are subject to regular review and revision as necessary.

The National Care Standards are used by service providers to maintain and improve the quality of services provided. The Care Inspectorate is also required by law to apply them when regulating care services.
