= United States v. Carroll Towing Co. =

1947 legal decision

- Court: United States Court of Appeals for the Second Circuit
- Full case name: United States et al. v. Carroll Towing Co., Inc., et al.
- Decided: January 9 1947
- Citation: 159 F.2d 169

Court membership
- Judges sitting: Learned Hand, Harrie B. Chase, Jerome Frank

Case opinions
- Majority: Hand, joined by Chase, Frank

United States v. Carroll Towing Co., 159 F.2d 169 (2d. Cir. 1947), is a decision from the 2nd Circuit Court of Appeals that proposed a test to determine the standard of care for the tort of negligence. The judgment was written by Judge Learned Hand wherein he described what is now called the Hand formula, a classic example of a balancing test.

== Background ==
The case was the result of the sinking of the barge Anna C that took place on January 4, 1944 in New York Harbor. The Pennsylvania Railroad Company chartered the Anna C from Conners Marine Company, which was loaded with flour owned by the United States. Before the accident, the Anna C was moored at Pier 52 on the North River along with several other barges. The barges at Pier 52 were tied together by mooring lines and one barge at Pier 52 was tied to another set of barges at the adjacent Public Pier. On the day of the accident the tug Carroll was sent to remove a barge from the Public Pier. In the process of removing the barge, the line between the barges at Pier 52 and the barges at the Public Pier was removed. After the removal of the line, the barges at Pier 52 broke free. This resulted in the sinking of Anna C. The United States, lessee of the Anna C, sued Carroll Towing Co., owner of the Carroll in an indemnity action.

== Ruling ==
The author of the opinion, Judge Learned Hand, stated that there was no general rule with which to deal with liability when a barge with no one on board breaks free and causes damage. Consequently, Judge Hand proposed an algebraic formula to determine if the standard of care has been met.

Since there are occasions when every vessel will break from her moorings, and since, if she does, she becomes a menace to those about her; the owner's duty, as in other similar situations, to provide against resulting injuries is a function of three variables: (1) The probability that she will break away; (2) the gravity of the resulting injury, if she does; (3) the burden of adequate precautions. Possibly it serves to bring this notion into relief to state it in algebraic terms: if the probability be called P; the injury, L; and the burden, B; liability depends upon whether B is less than L multiplied by P: i.e., whether B < PL.

Simply put, the test says:

If (Burden < Cost of Injury × Probability of occurrence), then the accused will not have met the standard of care required.

If (Burden ≥ Cost of injury × Probability of occurrence), then the accused may have met the standard of care.

On the facts, the Court ruled that leaving a barge unattended during the daylight hours poses significant risk such that it would be fair to require a crew member to be aboard the ship. Thus, the accused was found liable for negligence for being absent from the ship without excuse.

This case is most famous for its first expression of Judge Hand's formula, C > GL (cost is greater than gravity of loss) or in the more common shorthand, BPL. This formula was first suggested, however, in The T.J. Hooper, another tugboat case.
