= Negligence per se =

Doctrine in US law

Negligence per se is a doctrine in US law whereby an act is considered negligent because it violates a statute (or regulation). The doctrine is effectively a form of strict liability.

Negligence per se means greater liability than contributory negligence.

== Elements ==
In order to prove negligence per se, the plaintiff usually must show that:

1. the defendant violated the statute,
2. the act caused the kind of harm the statute was designed to prevent, and
3. the plaintiff was a member of the statute's protected class.

In some jurisdictions, negligence per se creates merely a rebuttable presumption of negligence.

A typical example is one in which a contractor violates a building code when constructing a house. The house then collapses, injuring somebody. The violation of the building code establishes negligence per se and the contractor will be found liable, so long as the contractor's breach of the code was the cause (proximate cause and actual cause) of the injury.

== History ==
A famous early case in negligence per se is Gorris v. Scott (1874), a Court of Exchequer case that established that the harm in question must be of the kind that the statute was intended to prevent. Gorris involved a shipment of sheep that was washed overboard but would not have been washed overboard had the shipowner complied with the regulations established pursuant to the Contagious Diseases (Animals) Act 1869, which required that livestock be transported in pens to segregate potentially-infected animal populations from uninfected ones. Chief Baron Fitzroy Kelly held that as the statute was intended to prevent the spread of disease, rather than the loss of livestock in transit, the plaintiff could not claim negligence per se.

A subsequent New York Court of Appeals case, Martin v. Herzog (1920), penned by Judge Benjamin N. Cardozo, first presented the notion that negligence per se could be absolute evidence of negligence in certain cases.

== Strict liability ==
Negligence per se involves the concept of strict liability. Within the law of negligence there has been a move away from strict liability (as typified by Re Polemis) to a standard of reasonable care (as seen in Donoghue v Stevenson, The Wagon Mound (No. 1), and Hughes v Lord Advocate). This is true not just for breach of the common law, but also for breach of statutory duty. The criminal law case of Sweet v Parsley (which required mens rea to be read into a criminal statue) follows this trend. In this light, "negligence per se" may be criticised as running counter to the general tendency.

== See also ==
- Illegal per se
- Tedla v. Ellman
