= Enterprise liability =

Legal doctrine of joint liabilty

Enterprise liability is a legal doctrine under which individual entities (for example, otherwise legally unrelated corporations or people) can be held jointly liable for some action on the basis of being part of a shared enterprise. Enterprise liability is a form of secondary liability.

== United States ==
Suppose high-risk manufacturing activities are shunted into one corporation, while a second "marketing" corporation keeps all the profits. In the case that someone was injured by the manufacturing activity, a court might apply the enterprise liability doctrine to allow recovery from the marketing corporation, which holds all the assets.

The doctrine emerged from litigation in the wake of the 1977 Beverly Hills Supper Club fire. The doctrine is examined in Walkovsky v. Carlton, 223 N.E.2d 6 (N.Y. 1966).

Enterprise Liability has been used as alternative terminology for Industry-Wide Liability.

Sindell v. Abbott Laboratories, 607 P.2d 924 (Cal. 1980) cites Hall v. E.I Du Pont De Nemours & Co., Inc., 345 F.Supp. 353 (E.D.N.Y. 1972) to explain Industry-Wide Liability, which was equated to Enterprise Liability:

In Hall, plaintiffs were 13 children injured by the explosion of blasting caps in 12 separate incidents which occurred in 10 different states between 1955 and 1959. The defendants were six blasting cap manufacturers, comprising virtually the entire blasting cap industry in the United States, and their trade association. There were, however, a number of Canadian blasting cap manufacturers which could have supplied the caps. The gravamen of the complaint was that the practice of the industry of omitting a warning on individual blasting caps and of failing to take other safety measures created an unreasonable risk of harm, resulting in the plaintiffs' injuries.

The complaint did not identify a particular manufacturer of a cap which caused a particular injury. The court reasoned as follows: there was evidence that defendants, acting independently, had adhered to an industry-wide standard with regard to the safety features of blasting caps, that they had in effect delegated some functions of safety investigation and design, such as labeling, to their trade association, and that there was industry-wide cooperation in the manufacture and design of blasting caps. In these circumstances, the evidence supported a conclusion that all the defendants jointly controlled the risk. Thus, if plaintiffs could establish by a preponderance of the evidence that the caps were manufactured by one of the defendants, the burden of proof as to causation would shift to all the defendants.

The court noted that this theory of liability applied to industries composed of a small number of units, and that what would be fair and reasonable with regard to an industry of five or ten producers might be manifestly unreasonable if applied to a decentralized industry composed of countless small producers.

The concept of Enterprise Liability is distinguished from Market share liability, a legal doctrine introduced in Sindell v. Abbott Laboratories.

== United Kingdom ==
The idea of enterprise liability was supported by the Court of Appeal in DHN Food Distributors Ltd v Tower Hamlets London Borough Council, a case on piercing the corporate veil.

More generally in the law of tort, the principle has been argued to have been recognised, albeit indirectly, by cases such as Lister v Hesley Hall Ltd. A general principle of joint liability in tort between different contractors that work in a supply chain was also recognised in Viasystems Ltd v Thermal Transfer Ltd.

== See also ==
- Corporate liability – Laws that create liability for business entities
- UK company law
- US corporate law

== Bibliography ==
- AA Berle, 'The Theory of Enterprise Entity' (1947) 47(3) Columbia Law Review 343
