= Sidaway v Board of Governors of the Bethlem Royal Hospital =

1985 UK legal case

- Court: House of Lords
- Decided: 21 February 1985
- Citation: [1985] UKHL 1, [1985] AC 871, [1985] 1 All ER 643

Keywords
- Informed consent

Sidaway v Board of Governors of the Bethlem Royal Hospital [1985] UKHL 1 is an important House of Lords case in English tort law, specifically medical negligence, concerning the duty of a surgeon to inform a patient of the risks before undergoing an operation.

It has largely been overturned by Montgomery v Lanarkshire Health Board, which determined that there is a duty on doctors to take reasonable care to ensure that a patient is aware of material risks inherent in treatment.

== Facts ==
The claimant suffered from pain in her neck, right shoulder, and arms. Her neurosurgeon took her consent for cervical cord decompression, but did not include in his explanation the fact that in less than 1% of the cases, the said decompression caused paraplegia. She developed paraplegia after the spinal operation.

== Judgment ==
Rejecting her claim for damages, the court held that consent did not require an elaborate explanation of remote side effects. In dissent, Lord Scarman said that the Bolam test should not apply to the issue of informed consent and that a doctor should have a duty to tell the patient of the inherent and material risk of the treatment proposed.

Lord Diplock stated "we are concerned here with volunteering unsought information about risks of the proposed treatment failing to achieve the result sought or making the patient’s physical or mental condition worse rather than better. The only effect that mention of risks can have on the patient’s mind, if it has any at all, can be in the direction of deterring the patient from undergoing the treatment which in the expert opinion of the doctor it is in the patient’s interest to undergo. To decide what risks the existence of which a patient should be voluntarily warned and the terms in which such warning, if any, should be given, having regard to the effect that the warning may have, is as much an exercise of professional skill and judgment as any other part of the doctor’s comprehensive duty of care to the individual patient, and expert medical evidence on this matter should be treated in just the same way. The Bolam test should be applied.’ and ‘a doctor’s duty of care, whether he be general practitioner or consulting surgeon or physician is owed to that patient and none other, idiosyncrasies and all.’ .’

== Subsequent Development ==
In Montgomery v Lanarkshire Health Board, the UK Supreme Court has overturned the decision, stating that Bolam test is not applicable on risk disclosure to patient, and that the doctor should not only disclose sufficient information regarding the risk to the patient, they should also consider the risk from patient's situation.

== See also ==
- Informed consent
- Negligence
- Bolam v Friern Hospital Management Committee
- Chester v Afshar
- Gillick v West Norfolk Area Health Authority
- Maynard v West Midlands Regional HA
- Montgomery v Lanarkshire Health Board
- Whitehouse v Jordan
