= S v Tembani =

S v Tembani may refer to either of two important cases in South African criminal law:

- S v Tembani 1999 (1) SACR 192 (W), where the Witwatersrand Local Division appeared to follow the proximate cause approach to the issue of legal causation; or
- S v Tembani 2007 (1) SACR 355 (SCA), where the Supreme Court of Appeal held that the deliberate infliction of an intrinsically dangerous wound, from which the victim was likely to die without medical intervention, must generally lead to liability for an ensuing death.

== See also ==
- South African criminal law
