= Market share liability =

Legal doctrine about product manufacturers and injuries

Market share liability is a legal doctrine that allows a plaintiff to establish a prima facie case against a group of product manufacturers for an injury caused by a product, even when the plaintiff does not know from which defendant the product originated. The doctrine is unique to the law of the United States and apportions liability among the manufacturers according to their share of the market for the product giving rise to the plaintiff's injury.

== Origins ==
Market share liability was introduced in the California case Sindell v. Abbott Laboratories. In Sindell, the plaintiffs were injured by DES, a drug prescribed to prevent miscarriage. The mothers of the plaintiffs had taken DES while pregnant, and expert testimony showed this to be a proximate cause of reproductive tract cancers in the plaintiffs years later. The plaintiffs, however, could not ascertain which drug company distributed the DES taken by their mothers. The court responded by allowing the plaintiffs to apportion liability among the defendant drug companies according to their respective shares in the DES market.

== Requirements ==
Sindell laid out the requirements for applying the doctrine of market share liability:

First, the defendants in court must constitute substantially all of the market. This is a distinguishing factor from alternative liability that requires that all of the defendants be in court (See Summers v. Tice). Having "substantially all" of the market makes it more likely that the actual wrongdoer will be in court. A main reason for not requiring all of the relevant market is that as time passes, some manufacturers drop out of the market, and it would raise the bar for the plaintiff too high. Also if all defendants were present, then market share liability would be unnecessary, because the plaintiff would be able to apply the doctrine of alternative liability to put the burden of proving causation onto the defendants.

Second, the products must be fungible (i.e. interchangeable—they must be of the same composition). For example, in Skipworth v. Lead Industries Association, 690 A.2d 169 (Pa. 1997), the Pennsylvania Supreme Court held that the lead paint the defendants sold to not be fungible because the paints had lead pigments containing different chemical formulations, different amounts of lead, and differed in potential toxicity.

Third, the defendants (potential tortfeasors) must all have been in the market within the specific timeframe surrounding the incident.

Fourth, the inability to point to a specific tortfeasor must not be the plaintiff's fault. This is particularly relevant in the pharmaceuticals context, as most plaintiffs are prescribed generic drugs and thus have no knowledge of who manufactured the product.

== Exculpatory evidence ==
Jurisdictions and courts differ on the possibilities open to defendants to absolve themselves of market share liability. In Sindell (California), the court allowed defendants to bring forth exculpatory evidence and thus free themselves of liability. However, in Hymowitz v. Eli Lilly & Co. (New York, 1989), which also concerned prescription of DES, the Appeal Court refused to allow exculpatory evidence because it felt that doing so would undermine the theory underpinning market share liability: because liability is based on relevant market share, providing exculpatory evidence will not reduce a defendant's overall share of the market.

== Subsequent cases ==
Sindell required plaintiffs to join defendant drug companies in a single action. A Wisconsin court took a different approach on this issue in Collins v. Eli Lilly Co. In Collins, the court found that the plaintiff could bring a cause of action against a single defendant, and the burden of proof would be shifted to the defendant to show that they did not produce the DES taken by the plaintiff's mother.

Efforts to expand the market share approach beyond DES cases have been mostly rejected because the strict requirements of applying market share liability. Courts have declined to expand the market-share approach to asbestos (Becker v. Baron Bros.), handguns (Hamilton v. Beretta), and lead paint (Santiago v. Sherwin Williams Co.). The market-share approach has been expanded to cases involving MTBE in the New York case In re Methyl Tertiary Butyl Ether.
