= March v Stramare (E & MH) Pty Ltd =

Judgement of the High Court of Australia

March v Stramare (E & MH)
- Court: High Court of Australia
- Full case name: March v Stramare (E & MH)
- Decided: 24 April 1991
- Citations: [1991] HCA 12, (1991) 171 CLR 506.

Case history
- Prior actions: March v E & MM Stramare Pty Ltd, 50 SARS 506 (SASC 1989).

Court membership
- Judges sitting: Chief Justice Mason, Justice Deane, Justice McHugh, Justice Toohey & Justice Gaudron

March v Stramare Pty Ltd (E & MH) Pty Ltd (commonly known as March v Stramare) was a High Court of Australia case decided in 1991 on Australian tort law. The case considered the conditions required for causation to be established in tort law, the limitations of the "but for" test and the significance of an intervening act by a third party in determining causation. In this case, the High Court held that, although it was useful in clarifying the facts of the case, the but-for test was not the exclusive test in determining causation as it posed difficulties in attributing responsibility for damages in two key types of cases. The first was in cases when attributing responsibility in cases where the damage was caused by the negligence of more than one party, and the second was in cases where the damage resulted from an intervening act. Instead, the court favoured a case-by-case basis approach in attributing legal responsibility for causation, which took both common sense principles and public policy concerns into consideration when coming to a decision.

The court also reaffirmed that an intervening act by a third party would be sufficient to break the chain of causation and shift the legal responsibility of the damages onto the third party. However, it was held that if the action had occurred due to the negligence or wrongdoing of the original defendant, it would not be considered an intervening act and would be insufficient to break the chain of causation.

With this ruling, the High Court reversed the decision of the full court of the Supreme Court of South Australia in March v E & MM Stramare Pty Ltd (1989). Instead the court upheld the first instance decision of the trial judge, stating that both parties were responsible for the incident.

== Background ==
=== Facts of the case ===
The facts of the case stated that on 15 March 1985 at approximately 1:00 am, a truck had been parked on the side of the road in Frome Street, Adelaide, by Danny Stefanato, who was an employee of the company E. & M. H. Stramare Pty Ltd. This was for the purpose of unloading wooden crates of fruits and vegetables from the truck to the footpath for a routine stock up of Stramare's fresh fruit and vegetable store. At the time of the incident the truck had been positioned along the centre line of a six-lane road and had both of its hazard lights and parking lights turned on. The incident arose when March sustained personal injury by driving his car into the back of the truck at a speed of approximately 60 kilometres per hour. Later testing revealed that at the time of the accident March had been speeding and driving under the influence of alcohol, with a blood alcohol level recorded at 0.221%. On these facts March sued Stefanato and the company, E. & M. H. Stramare Pty Ltd for the injuries he had sustained as a result of the accident.

=== Litigation history ===
The case originated at the Supreme Court of South Australia, heard by a single judge, where March had brought an action against Stefanato and Stramare for the injuries and damages he had sustained as a result of the collision between his car and the back of Stramare's truck. The primary judge, Justice Perry, had held that the accident had resulted due to the faults of both March and Stefanato/Stramare. March had been negligent due to his state of intoxication which had impaired his judgement and his ability to control his vehicle. Stefanato and Stramare had also been found to have contributed to the injuries and damages sustained by March, as he should have been aware of the possibility of an accident of this nature occurring by having the truck parked along the centre line of the street, regardless of the presence of the hazard and parking lights. As a result, Justice Perry divided the responsibility between the two parties on a 3:7 ratio to Stefanato/Stramare and March respectively.

Following this decision, Stefanato and Stramare appealed against this ruling, alleging that it was March's negligent driving that caused his injuries and not due to any alleged negligence in parking the truck, while March appealed on the basis that his own responsibility should be held at lower than 70%. This led to the case being heard on appeal and on a cross-appeal by the full court of the Supreme Court of South Australia in the year 1989. This appeal which was overseen by Justice Bollen, Justice Prior and Justice White. The majority consisting of Justice Bollen and Justice Prior (with Justice White dissenting) allowed the appeal, holding that March's injuries were a result of his own negligence which arose entirely out of his intoxicated state. Therefore, in this case, it was ruled that the accident was not the fault of Stefanato and Stramare.

This decision was disputed once again and the case was brought on appeal from the full court of the Supreme Court of South Australia, to the High Court of Australia in 1991 where it was heard before a panel of five judges consisting of Chief Justice Mason, Justice Deane, Justice McHugh, Justice Toohey and Justice Gaudron.

== Judgments ==
Chief Justice Mason:

Was of the opinion that, although it can be useful in determining legal causation, the but-for test should not be used as the exclusive test as it has the potential to produce results which defy common sense. More specifically, the but-for test was said to be limited in two key types of cases:

1. Where a case or an injury had two or more causes behind it.
2. Where the chain of events which occurred during a case had been broken by an intervening act.

Instead, Chief Justice Mason argued that both common sense principles and value judgments based on public policy considerations should be taken into account when attributing legal responsibility for causation. On this basis, he stated that both the negligence of Stefanato/Stramare in parking the truck in a risky position and the negligence of March in driving in an intoxicated state was what had caused March's injuries to occur. March's own negligence could not be considered as an intervening act which had dismissed the wrongful actions of Stefanato and Stramare, and subsequently allowed the appeal.

Justice Deane:

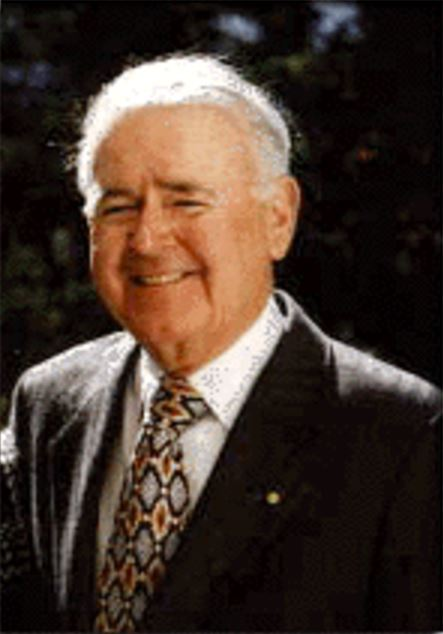
Justice Deane

Stated that although an attentive driver would have probably seen the truck's hazard and parking lights and would have not crashed into it, Stefanato and Stramare still possessed a duty of care towards all road users which extended even to intoxicated drivers like March. However, Justice Deane argued that March had still displayed negligence in driving under the influence of alcohol and consequently, legal responsibility should be apportioned between both parties pursuant to section 27A(3) of the Wrongs Act 1936 (SA).

Justice Deane also stated that he did not believe that the but-for test should be the exclusive test for all causation cases, providing three key reasons for this view:

1. The authority developed from previous cases suggested against a singular, definite test for causation.
2. It may lead to the unreasonable conclusion that an injury or a case had no definite cause in the event where there were two independent causes of the relevant accident.
3. Although the but-for test may consider an event to be a necessary condition for the injury to have been sustained, this may not always equate to the condition being a cause of the said event. The example provided was one of decapitation where although possessing a head was a necessary condition, it could not be said to be the cause of decapitation.

Based on these reasons, Justice Deane expressed the view that causation should be determined based on value judgments which took common sense principles into account, and allowed the appeal.

Justice Toohey:

Agreed with the reasoning provided by Chief Justice Mason, stating that but-for test was not the exclusive test for causation as it did possess limitations, especially when an intervening act was involved. Justice Toohey also reiterated that in cases of negligence, both value judgments and public policy concerns should be taken into account when attributing legal responsibility to the parties. On this basis, Justice Toohey stated that the appeal should be allowed and that the judgment of the trial judge should be restored.

Justice Gaudron:

Concurred with the conclusions drawn by Chief Justice Mason and Justice Deane in allowing the appeal.

Justice McHugh:

Stated that the appeal should be allowed as the action of parking a truck on the centre line of a six-lane road did give rise to a duty of care towards all users of said road. He expressed the view that Stefanato and Stramare had broken this duty of care by failing to prevent the reasonably foreseeable accident, and that the cost of March's injuries should be apportioned between both Stefanato/Stramare and March.

However, unlike the other judges, Justice McHugh had a different opinion on the subject of the but-for test and was of the view that it should be the exclusive test for causation. He argued that the inclusion of other rules such as common sense principles would produce an additional layer of inconsistency to decisions. Additionally, he stated that such rules should be considered as being founded upon policy, and used only to determine the remoteness of damages and not for the purposes of determining causation.

== Decision ==
The High Court of Australia ruled unanimously in allowing the appeal and reversed the decision made by the full court of the Supreme Court of South Australia in 1989. The majority judgment consisting of Chief Justice Mason, Justices Deane, Toohey and Gaudron (with Justice McHugh dissenting) held that the but-for test should not be the sole test in determining legal causation and instead a common sense approach should be adopted. Nevertheless, all five judges agreed on the fact that the presence of Stramare's truck parked along the centre line of the road was also a cause of March's injuries as well as the intoxicated state of March himself, rendering both parties responsible for the accident.

== Significance ==
The significance of this case arose primarily due to the impact it had on determining the issue of causation in Australian tort law. Prior to the decision made in March v Stramare, Australian courts utilised the 'but-for' test as the sole test in determining causation. Under this test, if the plaintiff's injuries would not have occurred if it had not been for the negligence of the defendant, then the defendant would be liable for the injuries and damages sustained by the plaintiff. However, as stated by former High Court of Australia justice James Edelman, after the decision made in March v Stramare, Australian courts changed the way they determined common law causation. Thus, in the aftermath of March v Stramare, in cases where legal causation had to be established, the but-for test was only a factor to consider instead of being the sole determining test for causation.

Additionally, this case also reaffirmed the idea developed in previous cases such as Chapman v Hearse (1961), that the requirement of reasonable foreseeability in the law of causation is not in itself a test for causation. Instead, as stated by Dr Ian Freckelton, March v Stramare affirmed that this criterion should only be used to mark 'the limits beyond which a wrongdoer will not be held responsible for his or her wrongful act'.
