= S v Bernardus =

South African legal case

S v Bernardus 1965 (3) SA 287 (A), an important case in South African criminal law, was one of unlawful assault (the throwing of a stick) which had resulted in death. The majority of the court, rejecting the view suggested by Hoexter JA in S v van der Mescht, that intention on the part of an accused to assault might, in the event of the victim's dying as a result of such assault, be sufficient to support a conviction of the assailant for culpable homicide, held that the correct criterion was that of foreseeability.

== See also ==
- South African criminal law
