= Joinder =

Joining of two or more legal issues

In law, a joinder is the joining of two or more legal issues together. Procedurally, a joinder allows multiple issues to be heard in one hearing or trial and occurs if the issues or parties involved overlap sufficiently to make the process more efficient or fairer. That helps courts avoid hearing the same facts multiple times or seeing the same parties return to court separately for each of their legal disputes. The term is also used in the realm of contracts to describe the joining of new parties to an existing agreement.

== Criminal procedure ==
Joinder in criminal law is the inclusion of additional counts or additional defendants on an indictment. In English law, charges for any offence may be joined in the same indictment if those charges are founded on the same facts or form or are a part of a series of offences of the same or a similar nature. A number of defendants may be joined in the same indictment even if no single count applies to all of them if the counts are sufficiently linked. The judge retains the option to order separate trials.

== Civil procedure ==
Joinder in civil law falls under two categories: joinder of claims and joinder of parties.

=== Joinder of claims ===
Joinder of claims refers to bringing several legal claims against the same party together. In the US federal court system, joinder of claims is governed by Rule 18 of the Federal Rules of Civil Procedure. The rule allows claimants to consolidate all of their claims that they have against an individual who is already a party to the case. Claimants may bring new claims even if the new claims are not related to the claims already stated; for example, a plaintiff suing someone for breach of contract may also sue the same person for assault. The claims may be unrelated, but they may be joined if the plaintiff desires.

Joinder of claims requires the court to have jurisdiction over the subject matter of each of the new claims and is never compulsory. A party who sues for breach of contract can bring his suit for assault at a later date if he chooses. However, if the claims are related to the same set of facts, the plaintiff may be barred from bringing claims later by the doctrine of res judicata. For example, if a plaintiff sues for assault and the case is concluded, he may not later sue for battery regarding the same occurrence.

=== Joinder of parties ===
Joinder of parties also falls into two categories: permissive joinder and compulsory joinder.

Rule 20 of the Federal Rules of Civil Procedure addresses permissive joinder, which allows multiple plaintiffs to join in an action if each of their claims arises from the same transaction or occurrence, and if there is a common question of law or fact relating to all plaintiffs' claims. For example, several landowners may join together in suing a factory for environmental runoff onto their property. Permissive joinder is also appropriate to join multiple defendants as long as the same considerations as for joining multiple plaintiffs are met. That often occurs in lawsuits regarding faulty products; the plaintiff will sue the manufacturer of the final product and the manufacturers of any constituent parts. The court must have personal jurisdiction over every defendant joined in the action.

Compulsory joinder is governed by Rule 19 of the Federal Rules of Civil Procedure, which makes it mandatory for some parties be joined. Parties that must be joined are those necessary and indispensable to the litigation. The rule includes several reasons why that might be true, including if that party has an interest in the dispute that they will be unable to protect if they are not joined. For example, if three parties each lay claim to a piece of property, and the first two sue each other, the third will not be able to protect their (alleged) interest in the property if they are not joined. Another circumstance is when a party might end up with inconsistent obligations; for example, they may be required by two different courts to grant two different parties exclusive rights to the same piece of property. Those and similar issues are avoided by joining the parties in one lawsuit. However, while "necessary" parties must be joined if that joinder is possible, the litigation will continue without them if joinder is impossible, for example if the court does not have jurisdiction over the party. In contrast, if "indispensable" parties cannot be joined, the litigation cannot go forward. Courts have some discretion in determining what parties are indispensable, but the Federal Rules provide some guidelines.

=== Timing ===
Rules 18 and 20 have different effects depending on when they are invoked. Joinder may occur as part of an original pleading. There is a discretionary period after the initial filing, during which original pleadings may be amended as a matter of course. Parties or claims or both may be joined during that time. However, if the time for modifying the pleadings has passed, the pleading can be amended with the permission of the opposing party or the judge though this permission is frequently granted. Rule 15 describes the process for amending a claim.

Under Rule 42 of Federal Rules of Civil Procedure, the court, if actions involve a common question of law or fact, may join any or all issues or consolidate the actions or issue any other orders to avoid unnecessary cost or delay. The court may also order a separate trial of one or more separate issues or claims for convenience, to avoid prejudice, or to expedite or improve economy.

=== European Court of Justice ===
Cases may be joined "on account of the connection between them" by the President of the Court after hearing the Judge-Rapporteur and the Advocate General, and (except in national cases requesting a preliminary ruling), after also hearing the parties. Where appropriate joined cases may be subsequently disjoined.

== Contract law and trust law ==
Joinder agreements are commonly used in mergers and acquisitions to bind individual shareholders to the terms of an existing merger agreement or shareholder agreement, and in trust practice to bind a donor to the terms and conditions of the trust.

== See also ==
- Alternative liability
