= Bolam v Friern Hospital Management Committee =

English landmark tort law case

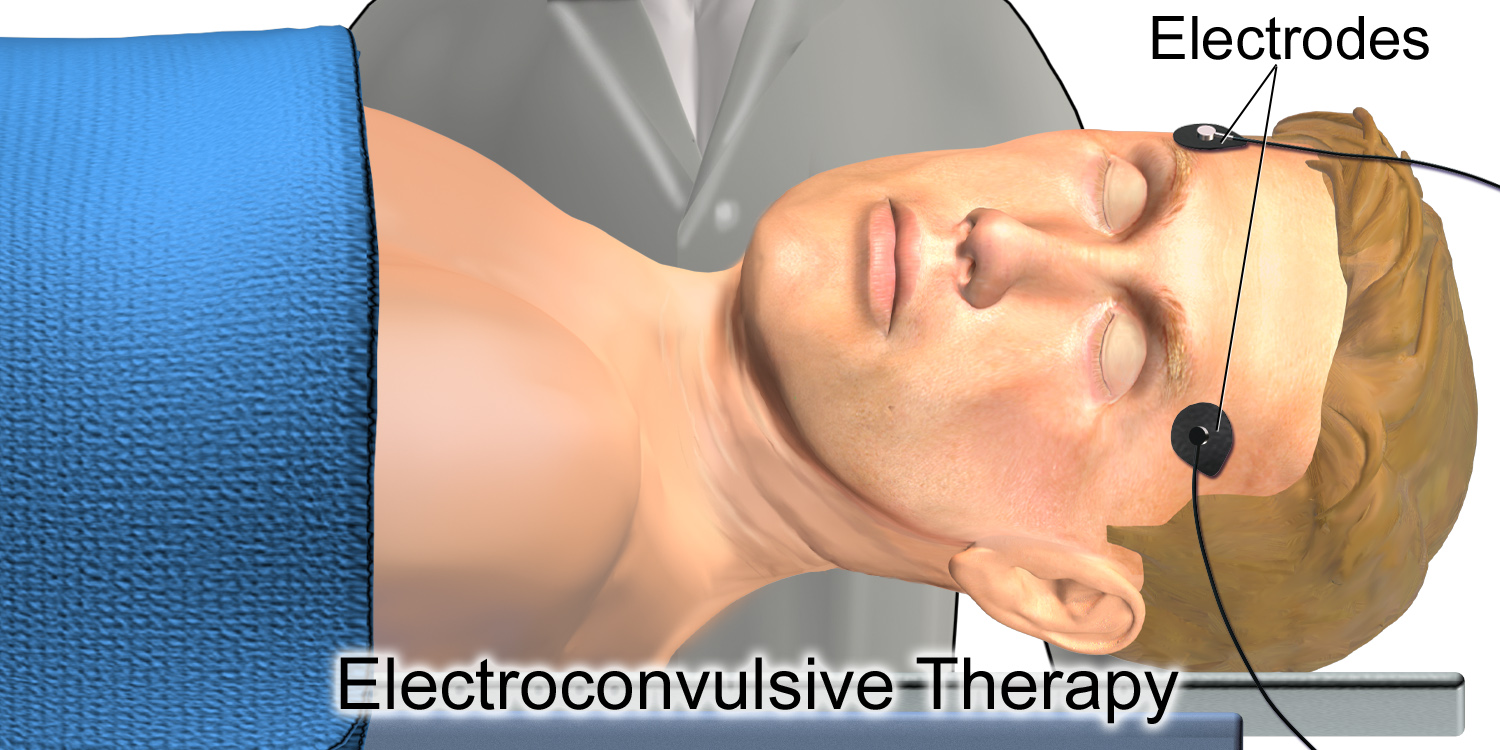
- Court: High Court
- Citation: [1957] 1 WLR 582

Keywords
- Reasonable care

Bolam v Friern Hospital Management Committee [1957] 1 WLR 582 is an English tort law case that lays down the typical rule for assessing the appropriate standard of reasonable care in negligence cases involving skilled professionals such as doctors. This rule is known as the Bolam test, and states that if a doctor reaches the standard of a responsible body of medical opinion, they are not negligent. Bolam was rejected in the 2015 Supreme Court decision of Montgomery v Lanarkshire Health Board in matters of informed consent.

== Facts ==
Mr Bolam was a voluntary patient at Friern Hospital, a mental health institution run by the Friern Hospital Management Committee. He agreed to undergo electro-convulsive therapy. He was not given any muscle relaxant, and his body was not restrained during the procedure. He flailed about violently before the procedure was stopped, and he suffered some serious injuries, including fractures of the acetabula. He sued the committee for compensation. He argued they were negligent for:

1. not issuing relaxants
2. not restraining him
3. not warning him about the risks involved.

At this time, juries were still being used for tort cases in England and Wales, so the judge's role would be to sum up the law and then leave it for the jury to hold the defendant liable or not.

== Judgment ==
Justice Sir William McNair (McNair J) who at the first instance noted that expert witnesses had confirmed, much medical opinion was opposed to the use of relaxant drugs, and that manual restraints could sometimes increase the risk of fracture. Moreover, it was the common practice of the profession to not warn patients of the risk of treatment (when it is small) unless they are asked. He held that what was common practice in a particular profession was highly relevant to the standard of care required. A person falls below the appropriate standard, and is negligent, if he fails to do what a reasonable person would in the circumstances. But when a person professes to have professional skills, as doctors do, the standard of care must be higher. "It is just a question of expression", said McNair J.

"I myself would prefer to put it this way, that he is not guilty of negligence if he has acted in accordance with a practice accepted as proper by a responsible body of medical men skilled in that particular art. I do not think there is much difference in sense. It is just a different way of expressing the same thought. Putting it the other way round, a man is not negligent, if he is acting in accordance with such a practice, merely because there is a body of opinion who would take a contrary view. At the same time, that does not mean that a medical man can obstinately and pig-headedly carry on with some old technique if it has been proved to be contrary to what is really substantially the whole of informed medical opinion. Otherwise you might get men today saying: "I do not believe in anaesthetics. I do not believe in antiseptics. I am going to continue to do my surgery in the way it was done in the eighteenth century." That clearly would be wrong."

In this case, the jury delivered a verdict in favour of the defendant hospital. Given the general medical opinions about what was acceptable electro-shock practice, they had not been negligent in the way they carried out the treatment. That passage is quoted very frequently, and has served as the basic rule for professional negligence over the last fifty years.

== Significance ==
Bolam was re-examined and revised in the 2015 Supreme Court decision of Montgomery v Lanarkshire Health Board.

The law distinguishes between liability flowing from acts and omissions, and liability flowing from misstatements. The Bolam principle addresses the first element and may be formulated as a rule that a doctor, nurse or other health professional is not negligent if he or she acts in accordance with a practice accepted at the time as proper by a responsible body of medical opinion, even though some other practitioners adopt a different practice. In addition, Hedley Byrne & Co. Ltd. v Heller & Partners Ltd. [1964] AC 465 created the rule of "reasonable reliance" by the claimant on the professional judgment of the defendant.

"Where a person is so placed that others could reasonably rely upon his judgment or his skill or upon his ability to make careful inquiry, and a person takes it upon himself to give information or advice to, or allows his information or advice to be passed on to, another person who, as he knows or should know, will place reliance upon it, then a duty of care will arise."

Because of the nature of the relationship between a medical practitioner and a patient, it is reasonable for the patient to rely on the advice given by the practitioner. Thus, Bolam applies to all the acts and omissions constituting diagnosis and consequential treatment, and Hedley Byrne applies to all advisory activities involving the communication of diagnosis and prognosis, giving of advice on both therapeutic and non-therapeutic options for treatment, and disclosure of relevant information to obtain informed consent.

- Barnett v Chelsea & Kensington Hospital [1968] 1 All ER 1068. Three men attended at the emergency department but the casualty officer, who was himself unwell, did not see them, advising that they should go home and call their own doctors. One of the men died some hours later. The post mortem showed arsenical poisoning which was a rare cause of death. Even if the deceased had been examined and admitted for treatment, there was little or no chance that the only effective antidote would have been administered to him in time. Although the hospital had been negligent in failing to examine the men, there was no proof that the deceased's death was caused by that negligence.
- Whitehouse v Jordan [1981] 1 All ER 267: The claimant was a baby who suffered severe brain damage after a difficult birth. The defendant, a senior hospital registrar, was supervising delivery in a high-risk pregnancy. After the mother had been in labour for 22 hours, the defendant used forceps to assist the delivery. The Lords found that the doctor's standard of care did not fall below that of a reasonable doctor in the circumstances and so the baby was awarded no compensation.
- Sidaway v Bethlem Royal Hospital Governors [1985] AC 871: The claimant suffered from pain in her neck, right shoulder, and arms. Her neurosurgeon took her consent for cervical cord decompression, but did not include in his explanation the fact that in less than 1% of the cases, the said decompression caused paraplegia. She developed paraplegia after the spinal operation. Rejecting her claim for damages, the court held that consent did not require an elaborate explanation of remote side effects. In dissent, Lord Scarman said that the Bolam principle should not apply to the issue of informed consent and that a doctor should have a duty to tell the patient of the inherent and material risk of the treatment proposed.
- Maynard v West Midlands Regional Health Authority [1985] 1 All ER 635. The patient presented with symptoms of tuberculosis but both the consultant physician and the consultant surgeon took the view that Hodgkin's disease, carcinoma, and sarcoidosis were also possibilities, the first of which if present would have required remedial steps to be taken in its early stages. Instead of waiting for the results of the sputum tests, the consultants carried out a mediastinoscopy to get a biopsy. The inherent risk of damage was to the left laryngeal recurrent nerve, even if the operation was properly done. In the event, only tuberculosis was confirmed. Unfortunately, the risk became a reality and the patient suffered a paralysis of the left vocal cord. The decision of the physician and the surgeon to proceed was said by their expert peers to be reasonable in all the circumstances.
- Hotson v East Berkshire Area Health Authority [1987] 2 All ER 909. The extent of the hip injuries to a 13-year-old boy was not diagnosed for five days. By the age of 20 years, there was deformity of the hip joint, restricted mobility and permanent disability. The judge found that even if the diagnosis had been made correctly, there was still a 75% risk of the plaintiff's disability developing, but that the medical staff's breach of duty had turned that risk into an inevitability, thereby denying the plaintiff a 25% chance of a good recovery. Damages included an amount of £11,500 representing 25% of the full value of the damages awardable for the plaintiff's disability. On appeal to the Lords, the question was whether the cause of the injury was the fall or the health authority's negligence in delaying treatment, since if the fall had caused the injury the negligence of the authority was irrelevant in regard to the plaintiff's disability. Because the judge had held that on the balance of probabilities, even correct diagnosis and treatment would not have prevented the disability from occurring, it followed that the plaintiff had failed on the issue of causation. It was therefore irrelevant to consider the question of damages.
- Wilsher v Essex Area Health Authority [1988] AC 1074 The defendant hospital, initially acting through an inexperienced junior doctor, negligently administered excessive oxygen during the post-natal care of a premature child who subsequently became blind. Excessive oxygen was, according to the medical evidence, one of five possible factors that could have led to blindness and, therefore, the Lords found that it was impossible to say that it had caused, or materially contributed, to the injury and the claim was dismissed. In a minority view, Mustill LJ. argued that if it is established that conduct of a certain kind materially adds to the risk of injury, if the defendant engages in such conduct in breach of a common law duty, and if the injury is the kind to which the conduct related, then the defendant is taken to have caused the injury even though the existence and extent of the contribution made by the breach cannot be ascertained.
- Bolitho v City and Hackney Health Authority [1997] 4 All ER 771: A two-year-old boy suffered brain damage as a result of the bronchial air passages becoming blocked leading to cardiac arrest. It was agreed that the only course of action to prevent the damage was to have the boy intubated. The doctor who negligently failed to attend to the boy said that she would not have intubated had she attended. There was evidence from one expert witness that he would not have intubated whereas five other experts said that they would have done so. The House of Lords held that there would have to be a logical basis for the opinion not to intubate. This would involve a weighing of risks against benefit in order to achieve a defensible conclusion. This means that a judge will be entitled to choose between two bodies of expert opinion and to reject an opinion which is 'logically indefensible'. This has been interpreted as being a situation where the Court sets the law not the profession.
- Albrighton v RPA Hospital, where a patient in Royal Prince Alfred Hospital who had been born with a spinal problem had her spinal cord totally severed leaving her a paraplegic. Reynolds JA rejected the proposition that doctors could not be negligent if they acted in accordance with the usual and customary practice and procedure in their "medical community", holding that "it is not the law that, if all or most of the medical practitioners in Sydney habitually fail to take an available precaution to avoid foreseeable risk of injury to their patients, then none can be found guilty of negligence".
- F v R, Where Chief Justice King said, "In many cases an approved professional practice as to disclosure will be decisive. But professions may adopt unreasonable practices. Practices may develop in professions, particularly as to disclosure, not because they serve the interests of the clients, but because they protect the interests or convenience of members of the profession. The court has an obligation to scrutinize professional practices to ensure that they accord with the standard of reasonableness imposed by the law. A practice as to disclosure approved and adopted by a profession or section of it may be in many cases the determining consideration as to what is reasonable. On the facts of a particular case the answer to the question whether the defendant's conduct conformed to approved professional practice may decide the issue of negligence, and the test has been posed in such terms in a number of cases. The ultimate question, however, is not whether the defendant's conduct accords with the practices of his profession or some part of it, but whether it conforms to the standard of reasonable care demanded by the law. That is a question for the court and the duty of deciding it cannot be delegated to any profession or group in the community."

=== Misfeasance ===
Where it can be shown that the decision-maker was not merely negligent, but acted with "malice", the tort of "misfeasance in public office" may give rise to a remedy. An example might be a prison doctor refusing to treat a prisoner because he or she had previously been difficult or abusive. Although proof of spite or ill-will may make a decision-maker's act unlawful, actual malice in the sense of an act intended to do harm to a particular individual, is not necessary. It will be enough that the decision-maker knew that he or she was acting unlawfully and that this would cause injury to some person, or was recklessly indifferent to that result.

- Palmer v Tees Health Authority [1998] All ER 180; (1999) Lloyd's Medical Reports 151 (CA) A psychiatric out-patient, who was known to be dangerous, murdered a four-year-old child. The claim was that the defendant had failed to diagnose that there was a real, substantial, and foreseeable risk of the patient committing serious sexual offences against children and that, as a result, it had failed to provide any adequate treatment for him to reduce the risk of him committing such offences and/or to prevent him from being released from the hospital while he was at risk of committing such offences. But the court struck out the claim on the grounds that there was no duty of care towards the child, as any child, at any time, was in the same danger. Furthermore, as the patient did not suffer from a treatable mental illness, there was no legal right to either treat or detain the person.
- Akenzua v Secretary of State for the Home Department [2002] EWCA Civ 1470, (2003) 1 WLR 741 where a dangerous criminal due to be deported, was released by the police/immigration services to act as an informant and killed a member of the public. The Lords held that if a public officer knows that his or her acts and omissions will probably injure a person or class of persons, the public body (or the state) will be liable for the consequences. In this case, it was arguable that there had been an illegal use of the power to permit the deportee to remain at liberty and that the officials exercising that power must have known that it was illegal. Given the criminal's record, the officials must at least have been reckless as to the consequences. For these purposes, it was not necessary to prove foresight that a particular individual might be at risk: it was enough that it was foreseeable that the criminal would harm somebody. Palmer was distinguishable because the relevant officials had the power to detain and deport the dangerous person.

== See also ==
- English tort law
- Breach of duty in English law
- F v R
- Shakoor v Situ
