= F v R =

South Australia medical negligence case

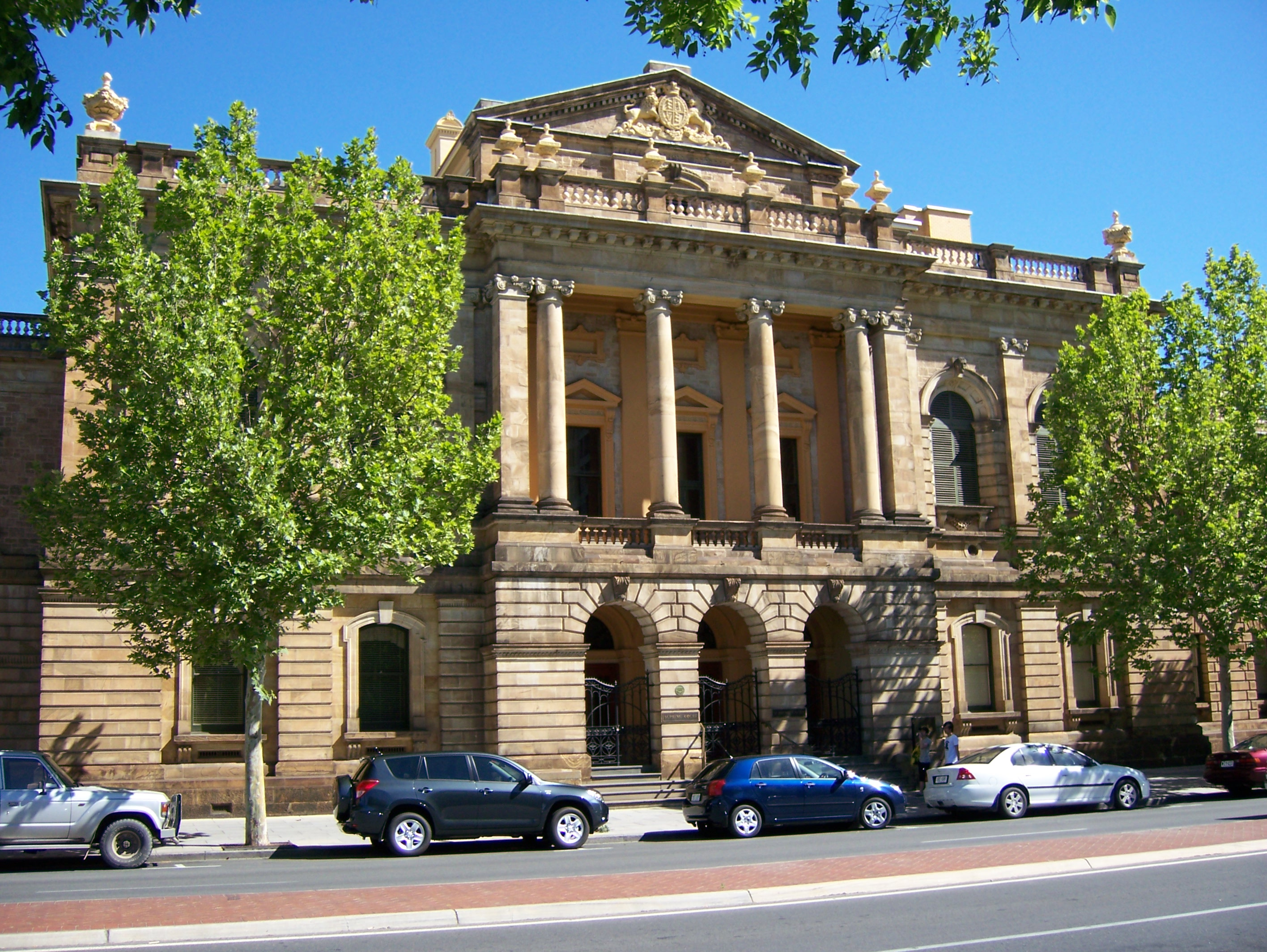
- Court: Supreme Court of SA (Full Court)
- Decided: 21 April 1983
- Citation: (1983) 33 SASR 189

Case history
- Prior action: F v R (1982) 29 SASR 437
- Subsequent action: Special leave refused F v R (1983) 155 CLR 689 (note)

Court membership
- Judges sitting: King CJ, Legoe & Bollen JJ

F v R, is a tort law case. It is a seminal case on what information medical professionals have a duty to inform patients of at common law.

It pre-dates the decision in Rogers v Whitaker which substantially followed F v R by departing from the Bolam test, at common law in regards to the duty of medical professionals to disclose risks to a patient.

== Background ==
=== Facts ===
A woman went to her gynaecologist and asked to be sterilised by tubal ligation. The doctor did not warn the woman that there was a less than 1% chance that she would fall pregnant after the operation. The woman had the procedure, but then a process known as recanalisation occurred and she fell pregnant. The woman and her husband sued her gynaecologist for negligence, alleging that the failure to inform them of the risk of pregnancy was a breach of the doctors duty of care.

=== Prior actions ===
In the Supreme Court Mohr J held that "the dominant and overriding desire of the plaintiffs was to avoid future pregnancies. This being the case it was in my opinion a breach of duty on the part of the defendant not to have informed them that there was a chance of failure". He awarded the woman damages of $10,250 and the man $250 for loss of consortium.

== Judgment ==
The doctor appealed to the Full Court. One of the issues was the standard of care expected of a careful and reasonable doctor. Chief Justice King said:

"In many cases an approved professional practice as to disclosure will be decisive. But professions may adopt unreasonable practices. Practices may develop in professions, particularly as to disclosure, not because they serve the interests of the clients, but because they protect the interests or convenience of members of the profession. The court has an obligation to scrutinize professional practices to ensure that they accord with the standard of reasonableness imposed by the law. A practice as to disclosure approved and adopted by a profession or section of it may be in many cases the determining consideration as to what is reasonable. On the facts of a particular case the answer to the question whether the defendant’s conduct conformed to approved professional practice may decide the issue of negligence, and the test has been posed in such terms in a number of cases. The ultimate question, however, is not whether the defendant’s conduct accords with the practices of his profession or some part of it, but whether it conforms to the standard of reasonable care demanded by the law. That is a question for the court and the duty of deciding it cannot be delegated to any profession or group in the community."

In separate judgments, each of the Judges, King CJ, Legoe & Bollen JJ, held that the risk of failure was so low, particularly in the experience of the three doctors that gave evidence, that the a careful and reasonable doctor would not have advised the woman of the statistical failure rates in the absence of a question from the patient.

== See also ==
- Negligence
- Albrighton v RPA Hospital
- Bolam v Friern Hospital Management Committee
- Chester v Afshar
