= Shakoor v Situ =

Shakoor v Situ (t/a Eternal Health Co) [2000] 4 All ER 181; [2001] 1 WLR 410; (2001) 57 BMLR 178; Independent, May 25, 2000; is a first instance case in English tort law on the standard of care appropriate for an alternative medicine practitioner. Its controversial ruling elaborates on the "responsible body of medical men" test from Bolam v Friern Hospital Management Committee.

== Facts ==
Mr Abdul Shakoor went to a Nottingham-based Chinese herbalist, which traded as the "Eternal Health Co." Mr Kang Situ, who ran the herbalist had trained for five years in China, gaining qualifications both in traditional Chinese medicine and 'modern' medicine. His grade was "excellent". He had no British professional medical qualifications. In November 1994, Mr Situ prescribed a course of Chinese herbal remedies for Mr Shakoor's benign lipomata, a skin condition, which produces fatty tissue that lies just below the skin, but causes no risk to health. There is no treatment in the UK, except surgical removal. Mr Shakoor was given a mix of twelve herbs in ten sachets which were to be taken on alternate days after a meal. After nine doses Mr Shakoor got ill, nauseous, his eyes went yellow and he suffered heartburn. He vomited, and had abdominal pain. He went to hospital, and was diagnosed as having "probably hepatitis A". His liver failed, he had hepatic necrosis. He had an operation, but he died in January 1995. In the post-mortem, his liver was found to contain Bai Xian Pi, or dictamnus dasycarpus, which some evidence suggested could be hepatotoxic.

== Judgment ==
Bernard Livesey QC found that there was no way to establish that the herbs could be known to contain toxic substances. Yet on the balance of probabilities, the herbal concoction was the cause of death. It was held that Mr Shakoor had an "idiosyncratic" reaction, a rare and unlucky allergic response to the herbal mix. He noted,

"unlike some alternative therapies, TCHM has a long and distinguished history; it has an oral tradition extending back some 4,000 years or more and a written tradition extending back some 2,000 years. It is practised alongside modern medicine in China and accordingly, I am told, a larger proportion of the world's population is treated by it than is treated by modern or western medicine. However, I learned little during the course of this trial as to the extent of current teaching, research, monitoring and verification of its practices in China or elsewhere."

He considered the argument that an herbalist should be held to the same standard as a normal NHS doctor, but disagreed.

"The Chinese herbalist, for example, does not hold himself out as a practitioner of orthodox medicine. More particularly, the patient has usually had the choice of going to an orthodox practitioner but has rejected him in favour of the alternative practitioner for reasons personal and best known to himself and almost certainly at some personal financial cost. Those reasons may include a passionate belief in the superiority of the alternative therapy or a fear of surgery or of reliance (perhaps dependence) on orthodox chemical medications which may have known undesirable side effects either short- or long-term or both.

The judge concluded that as long as the herbalist complies with the UK's laws, does not prescribe prohibited or regulated substances (under the Pharmacy and Poisons Act 1933, the Medicines Act 1968 or the Abortion Act 1967), and takes steps to keep abreast of pertinent information in the "orthodox" medical journals, it is appropriate to hold his standard of care to that of what a reasonable herbalist would do. In this case the prescription had not been inappropriate for a reasonable herbalist, and accordingly Mr Situ was not liable for the death of Mr Shakoor.

== See also ==
- English tort law
