= Montgomery v Lanarkshire Health Board =

2015 UK Supreme Court medical negligence case

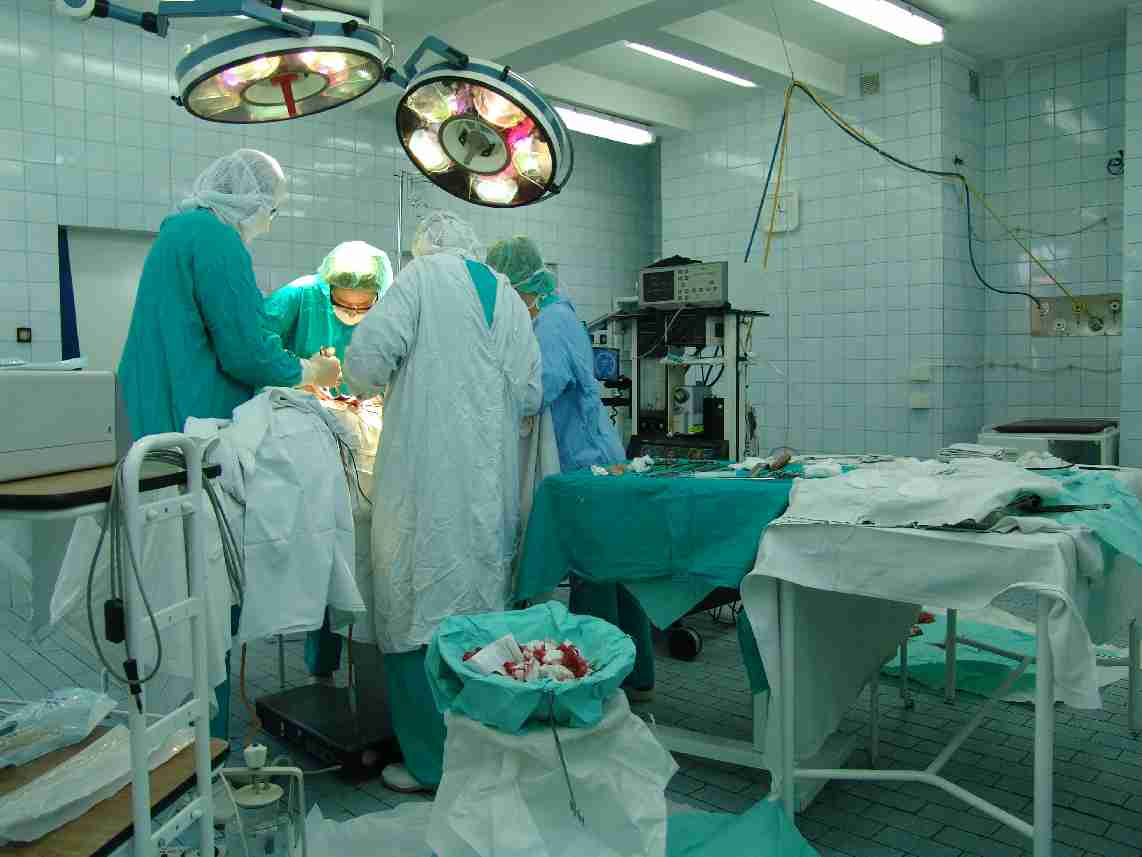
- Court: Supreme Court
- Decided: 11 March 2015
- Citation: [2015] UKSC 11

Court membership
- Judges sitting: Lord Neuberger, President Lady Hale, Deputy President, Lord Kerr, Lord Clarke, Lord Wilson, Lord Reed, Lord Hodge

Keywords
- Reasonable care, Informed consent

Montgomery v Lanarkshire Health Board [2015] UKSC 11 is a Scottish delict, medical negligence and English tort law case on doctors and pharmacists that outlines the rule on the disclosure of risks to satisfy the criteria of an informed consent. The Supreme Court departed and overruled the earlier House of Lords case in Sidaway v Board of Governors of the Bethlem Royal Hospital, in reconsidering the duty of care of a doctor towards a patient on medical treatment. The case changed the Bolam test to a greater test in medical negligence by introducing the general duty to attempt the disclosure of risks.

== Facts ==
The claimant was a woman of small stature and a diabetic under the care of a doctor during her pregnancy and labour. The doctor did not inform her of the 9-10% risk of shoulder dystocia, where the baby's shoulders are unable to pass through the pelvis among diabetic women as she viewed the problem being very slight and believed a caesarean section was not in the claimant's interest.

The baby suffered from severe disabilities after birth due to shoulder dystocia. The claimant sought damages from the health board for negligence on the part of the doctor for failing to advise her on the risk of shoulder dystocia. The Court of Session ruled that there was no negligence based on the Hunter v Hanley test and that there was no causation since the claimant would not have submitted to a caesarean birth even if informed of the pregnancy risk.

== Judgment ==
The Supreme Court affirmed the requirement of 'informed choice' or 'informed consent' by patients in medical treatment that rests fundamentally on the duty of disclosure by medical practitioners.

Lords Kerr and Reed said:

84. Furthermore, because the extent to which a doctor may be inclined to discuss risks with a patient is not determined by medical learning or experience, the application of the Bolam test to this question is liable to result in the sanctioning of differences in practice which are attributable not to divergent schools of thought in medical science, but merely to divergent attitudes among doctors as to the degree of respect owed to their patients.

85. A person can of course decide that she does not wish to be informed of risks of injury (just as a person may choose to ignore the information leaflet enclosed with her medicine); and a doctor is not obliged to discuss the risks inherent in treatment with a person who makes it clear that she would prefer not to discuss the matter. Deciding whether a person is so disinclined may involve the doctor making a judgment; but it is not a judgment which is dependent on medical expertise. It is also true that the doctor must necessarily make a judgment as to how best to explain the risks to the patient, and that providing an effective explanation may require skill. But the skill and judgment required are not of the kind with which the Bolam test is concerned; and the need for that kind of skill and judgment does not entail that the question whether to explain the risks at all is normally a matter for the judgment of the doctor. That is not to say that the doctor is required to make disclosures to her patient if, in the reasonable exercise of medical judgment, she considers that it would be detrimental to the health of her patient to do so; but the "therapeutic exception", as it has been called, cannot provide the basis of the general rule.

86. It follows that the analysis of the law by the majority in Sidaway is unsatisfactory, in so far as it treated the doctor's duty to advise her patient of the risks of proposed treatment as falling within the scope of the Bolam test, subject to two qualifications of that general principle, neither of which is fundamentally consistent with that test. It is unsurprising that courts have found difficulty in the subsequent application of Sidaway, and that the courts in England and Wales have in reality departed from it; a position which was effectively endorsed, particularly by Lord Steyn, in Chester v Afshar. There is no reason to perpetuate the application of the Bolam test in this context any longer.

87. The correct position, in relation to the risks of injury involved in treatment, can now be seen to be substantially that adopted in Sidaway by Lord Scarman, and by Lord Woolf MR in Pearce, subject to the refinement made by the High Court of Australia in Rogers v Whitaker, which we have discussed at paras 77-73. An adult person of sound mind is entitled to decide which, if any, of the available forms of treatment to undergo, and her consent must be obtained before treatment interfering with her bodily integrity is undertaken. The doctor is therefore under a duty to take reasonable care to ensure that the patient is aware of any material risks involved in any recommended treatment, and of any reasonable alternative or variant treatments. The test of materiality is whether, in the circumstances of the particular case, a reasonable person in the patient’s position would be likely to attach significance to the risk, or the doctor is or should reasonably be aware that the particular patient would be likely to attach significance to it.

Lords Neuberger, Clarke, Wilson and Hodge agreed.

Lady Hale gave a concurring opinion.

== See also ==
- Delict
- English tort law
- Breach of duty in English law
