= Albrighton v RPA Hospital =

Australian professional negligence case

- Court: NSW Court of Appeal
- Decided: 29 September 1980
- Citation: [1980] 2 NSWLR 542

Case history
- Prior action: Albrighton v Royal Prince Alfred Hospital [1979] 2 NSWLR 165
- Appealed from: Supreme Court of NSW

Court membership
- Judges sitting: Hope, Reynolds & Hutley JJA

Albrighton v RPA Hospital, is an Australian tort law case concerning the application of the Bolam test for professional negligence.

== Background ==
=== Facts ===
Ms Albrighton (née Zengin) was born with kyphoscoliosis and spina bifida which seriously impaired her respiratory function and shortened her life expectancy. In July 1971 she was admitted to Royal Prince Alfred Hospital for corrective surgery intended to straighten and lengthen her spine in a procedure known as halo-pelvic traction. At the hospital she was treated by Dr Harry Tyer, an orthopaedic surgeon. The hospital's consultation sheet recorded on 23 July 1971 that "Dr Tyer would appreciate advice regarding significance of her hairy naevus with respect to spinal pathology and possible dangers to cord of correction of scoliosis by halo-pelvic traction." The frame was attached to her skull and pelvis on 26 July 1971. On that day Professor Richard Gye, a neuro-surgeon, wrote on the consultation sheet "As she has had (just) traction I will see her later in the week." A myelogram was not carried out prior to applying traction, which commenced on 28 July. On 30 July Ms Albrighton started showing signs of spinal cord involvement. By 1 August Ms Albrighton became unable to walk. All traction was stopped on 2 August, however her spinal cord was totally severed leaving her a paraplegic. Professor Gye saw Ms Albrighton on 2 August however the paraplegia was irrevocable.

=== Prior actions ===
In 1977 Ms Albrighton commenced proceedings in the Supreme Court of NSW, claiming that either or both of the doctors were negligent and the hospital was vicariously liable for their negligence. The case was heard before Yeldham J and a jury. Yeldham J had allowed only part of the hospital medical records to be tendered. Neither Dr Tyer nor Professor Gye gave evidence. After 11 days of hearing Yeldham J directed the jury to return a verdict for the defendants. Yeldham J held that :

1. A hospital in NSW is only vicariously liable for the negligence of a doctor if it can direct the doctor as to the manner in which he can do his work. It is not enough if the hospital can direct the doctor as to what work he can do.
2. Having regard to the decision in Bolam v Friern Hospital Management Committee, negligence required proof of proper medical practice in Sydney in 1971.
3. There was no evidence on which the jury could find the hospital could direct the doctors as to the manner in which they did their work.
4. There was no evidence Professor Gye had seen Ms Albrighton nor given advice to Dr Tyer.
5. There was no evidence Dr Tyer was negligent in:

1. failing to obtain neurological advice from Professor Gye;
2. failing to have myelography carried out before traction was applied;
3. applying traction when there was a likelihood of tethering of the spine.

== Judgment ==
=== Standard of care ===
Reynolds JA rejected the proposition that doctors could not be negligent if they acted in accordance with the usual and customary practice and procedure in their “medical community”, holding that "it is not the law that, if all or most of the medical practitioners in Sydney habitually fail to take an available precaution to avoid foreseeable risk of injury to their patients, then none can be found guilty of negligence".

=== Claim against the hospital ===
Reynolds JA held that the hospital had undertaken to provide for Ms Albrighton's complete medical care and to provide that service through staff chosen by the hospital. On that evidence a jury could find that the hospital had undertaken to take reasonable care to provide for her medical needs and that there was an overriding and continuing duty of care owed by the hospital, regardless of the legal duties imposed on the doctors.

=== Admissibility of hospital records ===
Hutley JA held that the evidence of the hospital's Deputy Medical Records Administrator established that the whole of the hospital's records were written for the purposes of the hospital and that those records were "kept for the information of the staff and treating doctors. They are not likely repositories of the speculations of the inexpert; and this is a fact to be considered on their admissibility". Accordingly, the documents should have been admitted. Similarly Hope JA held that the records were made by people who intended them to be as accurately as possible. While mistakes could occur they were likely to be far more reliable than human memory.

=== Claim against Dr Tyer ===
Reynolds JA held that on the evidence a jury could have found that Dr Tyer had some reservations about applying traction and knew that traction could endanger the integrity of Ms Albrighton's spinal cord. Despite those reservations Dr Tyer had applied traction without receiving any advice or any further diagnostic investigations. On this basis the jury could have found that Dr Tyer had been negligent.

=== Claim against Professor Gye ===
Reynolds JA held that on 26 July 1971 Professor Gye ought to have been alerted to the possibility that the spinal cord had not developed properly and knew and accepted that the danger to her spinal cord would depend on his advice. This was enough to impose a duty of care on Professor Gye and the jury may have found that his failure to intervene was a breach of his duty of care.

=== Aftermath ===
The Court of Appeal did not decide whether or not the hospital or doctors had been negligent and instead ordered that there be a new trial. There is, however, no record of whether such a trial occurred nor its outcome.

== Subsequent consideration ==
The approach of the Court of Appeal was subsequently approved by the High Court in Rogers v Whitaker

== See also ==
- Negligence
- Bolam v Friern Hospital Management Committee
- F v R
