= S v Tembani (1998) =

South African legal case

In S v Tembani, an important case in South African criminal law, especially in respect of the issue of legal causation, it seemed to the Witwatersrand Local Division, following the approach of English law, to be "of overriding importance that the original wound inflicted by the accused was an operating and substantial cause of the death of the deceased." If, at the time of death, the original wound is still an operating and substantial cause of death, then the death is a result of the wound, even if another cause was also operating. The court thus appeared to endorse the "proximate-cause" criterion, also known as direct-consequences or individualisation theory, of legal causation. The court added that death is not the result of the original wound if it is just the setting in which another cause operates. Only if the second cause is so overwhelming as to make the original wound merely part of the history may it be said that death does not flow from the wound.

== See also ==
- South African criminal law
