= Maynard v West Midlands Regional HA =

Maynard v West Midlands Regional Health Authority is an English tort law case concerning the Bolam test for professional negligence.

The patient presented with symptoms of tuberculosis but both the consultant physician and the consultant surgeon took the view that Hodgkin's disease, carcinoma, and sarcoidosis were also possibilities, the first of which if present would have required remedial steps to be taken in its early stages. Instead of waiting for the results of the sputum tests, the consultants carried out a mediastinoscopy to get a biopsy. The inherent risk of damage was to the left laryngeal recurrent nerve, even if the operation was properly done. In the event, only tuberculosis was confirmed. Unfortunately, the risk became a reality and the patient suffered a paralysis of the left vocal cord. The decision of the physician and the surgeon to proceed was said by their expert peers to be reasonable in all the circumstances.

The trial judge initially held that the surgeon had been negligent for failing to use a different surgical technique that was advocated by one group of medical experts. However, the Court of Appeal reversed the decision, and the House of Lords upheld that reversal, stating that "differences of opinion and practice within the medical profession are inevitable, and that a court's preference for one medical opinion over another is not a basis for finding negligence". This decision reaffirmed the Bolam principle, which holds that a doctor will not be considered negligent if they have acted in accordance with a responsible body of medical opinion, although the later case of Bolitho somewhat qualified Bolam.

== See also ==
- Negligence
