= Beverly Hills Supper Club fire =

Nightclub fire in Kentucky in 1977

- The club on fire
- Date: May 28, 1977
- Venue: Beverly Hills Supper Club
- Location: Southgate, Kentucky, U.S.; 39°03′49″N 84°27′54″W
- Deaths: 165
- Injuries: 200+

On the evening of May 28, 1977, a fire occurred at the Beverly Hills Supper Club in Southgate, Kentucky. With a total of 165 deaths and over 200 injuries, it is history's seventh-deadliest nightclub fire.

== Club ==
The Beverly Hills Supper Club was a major attraction, less than 2.5 miles (4 km) outside Cincinnati, just across the Ohio River in Southgate, Kentucky, on US 27, near what later became its interchange with Interstate 471. The club booked its entertainers from Las Vegas, Nashville, Hollywood, New York, and other show-business hubs. The site had been a popular nightspot and illegal gambling house as early as 1926. Ohio native Dean Martin had been a blackjack dealer there.

In 1967, organized crime figures Moe Dalitz, Morris Kleinman and Samuel A. Tucker sold The Beverly Hills Country Club to Joseph E. Cole, Sam W. Klein, Carl Glickman and two other men (one of whom has been linked to New Jersey mob boss Gerardo Catena), who, in 1974, sold to the Richard Schilling family.

In 1971, the club reopened under the then-current owners and management and was considered an elegant venue that attracted top-notch talent such as The Supremes, Diahann Carroll, Rosemary Clooney and Tony Bennett and affluent clientele.

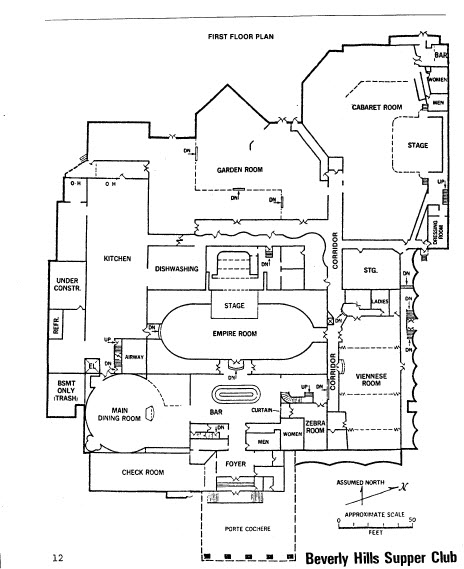
A floor plan of the former Beverly Hills Supper Club

Several additions had been built onto the original structure between 1970 and 1976, creating a sprawling, non-linear complex of function rooms and service areas. The resulting complex was roughly square, and though it was not situated in a north–south direction, reports of the fire have tended to use these as reference points when describing the complex. Assuming this system, the front entrance of the complex lay at the southern point of the compass. Along the central portion of the southern wall, to the east of the building entrance, was a small event room called the Zebra Room. A narrow corridor to the Zebra Room's east separated it from the Viennese Room and a series of service spaces, which ran northward along the building's eastern wall. This interior corridor terminated between the Garden Room, occupying the central portion of the north wall of the building, and the Cabaret Room, which jutted out from the northeastern corner of the building.

A smaller, branching corridor led from the internal corridor to an exit door that sat between the Garden Room and the Cabaret Room; to exit the building from the Cabaret Room using that corridor, a person had to pass through a set of double doors into the main interior corridor, pass through a single door between the main interior corridor and the branching interior corridor, turn a sharp corner into the branching corridor, and proceed approximately one-quarter of the length of the Cabaret Room to the single door connecting the branching corridor to the exterior. This complex navigation was not atypical for the building; a number of other event and services spaces were scattered through the rest of the building, with some rooms leading into each other, some leading into interior hallways, and some leading to the outside of the building. A partial second story covered approximately the southern third of the building, sitting above the main entrance, Zebra Room, and main dining room; it held two more small event rooms made of six smaller rooms conjoined, collectively labeled the Crystal Rooms.

Though the building's frame and ceiling tiling was classified as non-combustible, the Beverly Hills Supper Club made substantial use of wooden building materials, including floor joists for the two-story portion of the complex and framing on interior hallways. It was decorated throughout with highly flammable carpeting and wood wall paneling; event rooms also used wooden tables and supports, as well as tablecloths, curtains, and a variety of other small combustible materials. The building did not have a fire-suppression sprinkler system installed—at the time, these were not required in venues such as the Supper Club—nor did it have an alarm system or smoke detectors. In addition, the majority of the paths of egress in each event room led not to the outside of the building but to a variety of narrow interior corridors and service spaces.

== Fire ==
On Saturday, May 28, 1977, the Beverly Hills Supper Club was operating beyond capacity, largely due to the popularity of that evening's Cabaret Room show featuring Hollywood singer and actor John Davidson. Based on its number of exits, the Cabaret Room could safely accommodate about 600 people, according to the calculations of the fire marshal. On that night it exceeded capacity, with people seated on ramps and in aisles. According to later estimates based on seating charts and memories of those present, the number of patrons in the Cabaret Room at 9:00 p.m. was between 900 and 1,300. Regardless of the exact number, sources agree that the room was beyond its safety capacity.

Elsewhere in the club, patrons were dining on gourmet meals. Later estimates place the total number of people in the Beverly Hills Supper Club on May 28, 1977, at approximately 3,000, substantially more than the 1,500 people the fire code allowed at the time for a building with the number of exits the club had.

Near the south exit close to the main bar, the opposite end of the building from the Cabaret Room, a wedding reception drew to a close around 8:30 p.m. in the Zebra Room, near the building's main entrance; some of its guests had complained of the room being excessively warm with loud explosions from beneath the floor, and the group left the building before the end of their allotted time. The room remained vacant from their departure until 8:59 p.m. when an employee smelled smoke and opened the Zebra Room's door to confirm the presence of smoke. She asked another employee to call the fire department while she and others began trying to fight the flames with fire extinguishers. The employees' opening of the Zebra Room's door allowed enough oxygen into the room to cause what had been a smoldering fire in the room's drop ceiling to flash over and begin to spread rapidly, becoming impossible to extinguish with the fire extinguishers. The Fire Department was alerted to the fire at 9:01 p.m. and arrived by 9:05; as they approached, firefighters on the first emergency vehicles could see smoke coming from the building.

As smoke began to escape the Zebra Room and drift down the hall toward other banquet rooms, patrons and employees nearest to the Zebra Room smelled it. The employees began to urge room occupants to leave the building. As the complex lacked an audible fire alarm, those in more isolated rooms were unaware of the fire until an employee walked the length of the building and alerted them. Fire investigators later estimated that, once it spread through the northern doors of the Zebra Room, it took two to five minutes for the fire to spread to the Cabaret Room; as a result, news of the fire and the first of the smoke and flame reached the Cabaret Room, the farthest point from the Zebra Room, nearly simultaneously. By the time busboy Walter Bailey arrived in the Cabaret Room and interrupted the show to order an evacuation at 9:06 p.m., there was very little time left for the audience of around 1,000 people to leave via the room's small number of exits. As it spread laterally, the fire also began to spread upwards, engulfing the spiral staircase that would have provided the best exit for those on the second floor of the building.

Around 9:10 p.m., power failed in the building, extinguishing the lights. Panic ensued, and those who had been calmly moving toward exits in the Cabaret Room began to push and shove each other. The fire blocked two of the room's three exits, leaving a single exit for the crowd to funnel through. Employees outside the exits attempted to pull guests to safety, but the crush of bodies created as those behind pushed upon those in front became so solid that no amount of strength could free most of them. Many of those who escaped the crush blocking the northeast fire exit became lost trying to find other exits. The building's confusing design often led to a set of doors opening into a bar area that funneled frantic guests into a dead end.

Alerted that the majority of the building's occupants were in the Cabaret Room, firefighters focused their efforts there, to little avail. Temperatures in the Cabaret Room rose into the thousands of degrees, leaving firefighters weary and dehydrated and unable to safely attempt any further rescues.

When I got to the inside doors, which is about 30 feet inside the building, I saw these big double doors, and people were stacked like cordwood. They were clear up to the top. They just kept diving out on each other trying to get out. I looked back over the pile of – it wasn't dead people; there were dead and alive in that pile – and I went in and I just started to grab them two at a time and pull them off the stack, and drag them out...

— Bruce Rath, Fort Thomas Volunteer Fire Department,

At 11:30 p.m., fire command, suspecting that the building's roof would soon collapse, ordered all firefighters to evacuate the building. The roof collapsed onto what remained of the building approximately 30 minutes later. Firefighters were able to get the fire under control at around 2 a.m., but it took them until Monday, May 30, to extinguish the fire entirely.

== Victims ==
By the time the search for bodies ended in the early evening of May 29, 159 bodies—most of which were found in the area of the Cabaret Room—had been recovered from the premises; initially laid out on the hillside surrounding the building, they were brought to a makeshift morgue inside the nearby Fort Thomas Armory. On the afternoon of June 1, the death toll rose to 161 when another two bodies were found in the rubble where the Viennese Room was. A 162nd victim died in hospital on June 11, a 163rd on June 23, a 164th on July 1, and a 165th nine months after the fire on March 1, 1978.

== Investigation ==
The investigation into the fire found the following deficiencies, as enumerated by The Cincinnati Enquirer:

- Overcrowding: Although seating charts recovered from the club after the fire show that the Cabaret Room (the largest facility in the club) normally held between 614 and 756 people, a hostess who had worked at the club for several years estimated occupancy on the date in question to be well over 925.
- Inadequate fire exits: Full occupancy of the entire complex was estimated to be roughly 2,750, which, according to Kentucky law, would require 28 exits (one for every hundred people). The club had fewer than 17 exits, many of which were not clearly marked nor easily reached. Some exits could be reached only by passing through three or more interior doors and corridors.
- Faulty wiring: Governor Julian Carroll's report on the fire called the club's wiring an "electrician's nightmare" and alleged multiple, wide-ranging code violations. Bridgetown electrician H. James Amend, who inspected the fire site at the request of local attorney Stan Chesley a year and a half later, said, "I cannot believe that any of this was ever inspected."
- Lack of firewalls: This allowed the fire to spread and draw oxygen from other areas of the complex.
- Poor construction practices: The club had been built piecemeal with inadequate roof support, no common ceiling space, and highly flammable components.
- Extreme safety code violations: There was no sprinkler system and no audible automatic fire alarm.
- Poor oversight by regulatory authorities: According to the Enquirer, the local volunteer fire department knew of the deficiencies, but by law, at the time, did not have the authority to compel corrections.

=== Lawsuit ===
This was the first lawsuit to use the concept of "enterprise liability" and one of the first disaster suits to be brought as a class action. Chief litigation attorney Stanley Chesley raised millions through the class action, benefiting many survivors.

== Aftermath ==
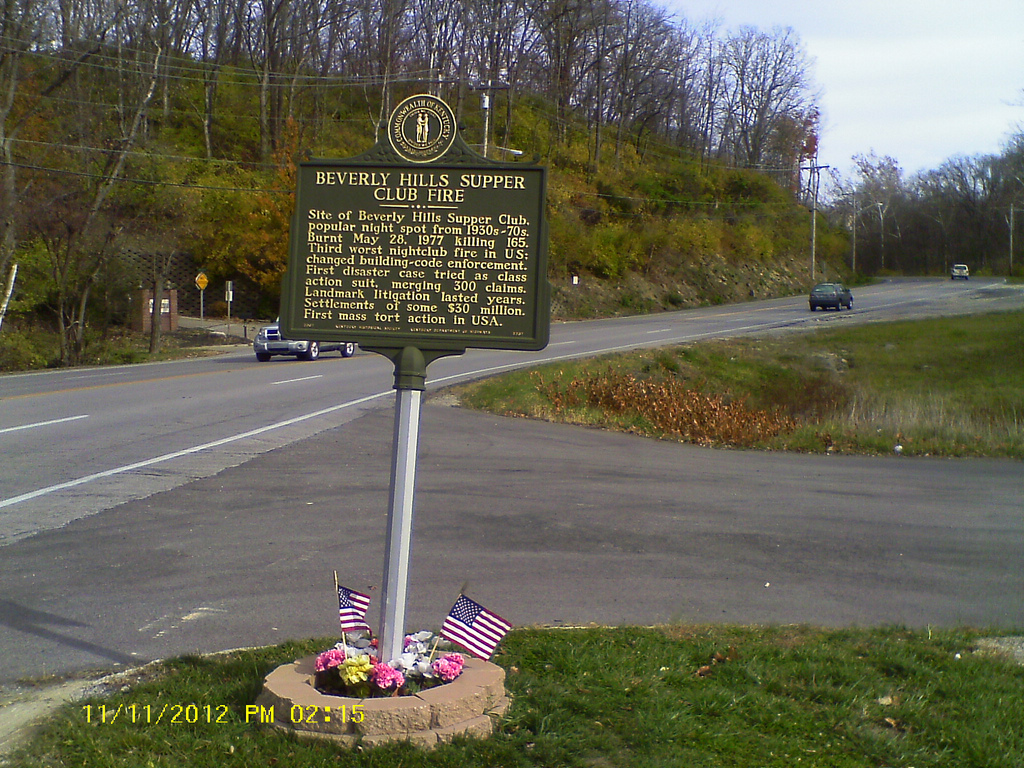
Beverly Hills Supper Club site, Southgate, Kentucky (2012)

Richard Whitt of the Louisville Courier-Journal was awarded the 1978 Pulitzer Prize for Local General or Spot News Reporting for his articles on the fire. His citation reads: "For his coverage of a fire that took 164 lives at the Beverly Hills Supper Club at Southgate, Ky., and subsequent investigation of the lack of enforcement of state fire codes."

In a letter dated July 8, 2011, Kentucky Attorney General Jack Conway ordered a retired Kentucky State Police forensic specialist to return 30 boxes of color slides taken in the days after the fire, including pictures of the club's basement during the aftermath, which the forensic specialist had taken personal possession of following his retirement from the State Police. Conway decided that these documents were public records and must be handled and made available to the public in accordance with Kentucky's Open Records Act.

A state historic marker commemorates the fire. Although off-limits to the public, the site was a popular destination for urban explorers, many of whom have found relics from the club.

In 2020, a private developer reached a deal with the City of Southgate to build a mixed-use development on the site. First responders, families of fire victims, and others filed a lawsuit in September 2020 to halt the project, but came to an agreement in November 2020, allowing the project to move forward. In May 2023, a permanent memorial was inaugurated near the development's northern access road.

=== Later arson allegations ===
Author Robert D. Webster, along with co-authors David Brock and Thomas McConaughy, in their 2012 investigative history Beverly Hills Supper Club: The Untold Story of Kentucky's Worst Tragedy, alleges that the fire was actually set deliberately by the mafia, in retaliation for the Supper Club's owner's refusing to sell the venue to them. Webster and McConaughy began their investigation at the behest of David Brock, who had been a busboy at the venue on the night of the fire and claimed to have seen unidentified "maintenance men" working in the ceiling of one of the party rooms shortly before the fire broke out. Webster was awarded a 2013 Kentucky History Award for his work on their book.

Brock's allegations had previously been presented to Kentucky Governor Steve Beshear in 2008 by a group called the Beverly Hills Survivors for Justice. Beshear appointed a special Governor's Review Team, which reviewed the allegations and evidence with assistance from the Office of Inspector General of the Kentucky Public Protection, Environment and Energy, and Labor Cabinets. This Review Team's final report on the matter described the allegations as "a very tiny shred of evidence of arson and a huge mountain of conjecture, unsupported speculation, and personal opinion" which "fall[s] many miles short of the kind of proof that would be needed to justify a ... re-investigation ..."

== See also ==
- Carrollton bus collision
- The Who concert disaster
