= Alternative liability =

Legal doctrine

Alternative liability is a legal doctrine that allows a plaintiff to shift the burden of proving causation of their injury to multiple defendants, even though only one of them could have been responsible. The leading case showing the principle of alternative liability in action is Summers v. Tice, where the two defendants negligently shot in the direction of the plaintiff and two pellets caused the plaintiff's injury, one in the right eye and one in the upper lip. In the interests of justice, the innocent plaintiff's case is not defeated because they cannot prove which party was the actual cause (but-for cause) of their injury.

== Requirements ==
The doctrine requires that the plaintiff bring all possible defendants into court and that the plaintiff show the defendants all breached a duty of reasonable care. The burden then shifts to the defendants to provide evidence of who caused the injury.

== Rationale ==
The underpinning of this doctrine is that a plaintiff should not be barred from seeking recovery simply because they does not know who caused their injury. The defendants are usually the parties in the best position to have the relevant information.

Distinguish alternative liability from the smoke-out function of res ipsa loquitur seen in the leading case of Ybarra v. Spangard. In Ybarra, the plaintiff brought all defendants who could have possibly been negligent (breached a duty of reasonable care) so that they could show which party actually was negligent. Thus, in the smoke-out function of res ipsa, the burden is shifted on the defendants to show negligence, whereas in alternative liability all defendants are all shown to have breached a duty of reasonable care and the plaintiff shifts the burden to show causation.
