= S v Tembani (2006) =

South African legal case

In S v Tembani, an important case in South African criminal law, the Supreme Court of Appeal held that the deliberate infliction of an intrinsically dangerous wound, from which the victim was likely to die without medical intervention, must generally lead to liability for an ensuing death, whether or not the wound was readily treatable, and even if the medical treatment given later was substandard or negligent—unless the victim had so recovered that at the time of the negligent treatment the original injury no longer posed a danger to his life.

== See also ==
- South African criminal law
