= Sindell v. Abbott Laboratories =

- Supreme Court of California

Decided March 20, 1980
- Full case name: Judith Sindell, Plaintiff and Appellant, v. Abbott Laboratories, Defendants and Respondents. Maureen Rogers, Plaintiff and Appellant, v. Rexall Drug Company et al., Defendants and Respondents.
- Citation(s): 26 Cal. 3d 588; 607 P.2d 924; 163 Cal. Rptr. 132

Holding
- Companies may be held liable for damages equivalent to their market share of a harmful product at the time it was consumed. Judgement reversed.

Court membership
- Chief Justice: Rose Bird
- Associate Justices: Stanley Mosk, William P. Clark Jr., Frank K. Richardson, Wiley Manuel, Frank C. Newman, Thomas P. White (Note: Assigned by judicial counsel)

Case opinions
- Majority: Mosk, joined by Bird, Newman, White
- Dissent: Richardson, joined by Clark, Manuel

Sindell v. Abbott Laboratories, 26 Cal. 3d 588 (1980), was a landmark products liability decision of the Supreme Court of California which pioneered the doctrine of market share liability.

== Background ==
The plaintiff in Sindell was a young woman who developed cancer as a result of her mother's use of the drug diethylstilbestrol (DES) during pregnancy. A large number of companies had manufactured DES around the time the plaintiff's mother used the drug. Since the drug was a fungible product and many years had passed, it was impossible for the plaintiff to identify the manufacturer(s) of the particular DES pills her mother had actually consumed.

== Decision ==
In a 4-3 majority decision by Associate Justice Stanley Mosk, the court decided to impose a new kind of liability, known as market share liability. The doctrine evolved from a line of negligence and strict products liability opinions (most of which had been decided by the Supreme Court of California) that were being adopted as the majority rule in many U.S. states. The essential components of the theory are as follows:

1. All defendants named in the suit are potential tortfeasors (that is, they did produce the harmful product at issue at some point in time)
2. The product involved is fungible
3. The plaintiff cannot identify which defendant produced the fungible product which harmed her in particular, through no fault of her own
4. A substantial share of the manufacturers who produced the product during the relevant time period are named as defendants in the action

If these requirements are met, a rebuttable presumption arises in favor of the plaintiff; if she can prove actual damages, then a court may order each defendant to pay a percentage of such damages equal to its share of the market for the product at the time the product was used. A manufacturer may rebut the presumption and reduce its market share damages to zero by showing that its product could not have possibly injured the plaintiff (for example, by demonstrating that it did not manufacture the product during the time period relevant for that particular plaintiff).

Mosk later explained in an oral history interview that the court got the idea for market share liability from the Fordham Law Review comment cited extensively in the Sindell opinion.

=== Dissent ===
Associate Justice Frank K. Richardson wrote a dissent in which he accused the majority of judicial activism and argued that the judiciary should defer to the legislature, whose role it was to craft an appropriate solution to the problems presented by the unique nature of DES.

== Problems of doctrine ==
Courts after Sindell have refused to apply the market share doctrine to products other than drugs such as DES. The argument centers on the fact that a product must be fungible to hold all producers equally liable for any harm. If the product was not fungible, then different production methods or gross negligence in manufacturing might imply that some manufacturers were actually more culpable than others, yet they would only be required to pay up to their share of the market. The time period over which the harm occurred is also an issue: in Skipworth v. Lead Industries Association 690 A.2d 169 (Pa. 1997), a 1997 Pennsylvania case, the plaintiffs complained of the use of lead-based paint in their house and brought suit against Lead Industries Association. The court refused to apply the market share theory because the house had stood for over a century and many manufacturers of lead-based paint had since gone out of business, while others named in the suit had not existed at the time the house was painted. The court also noted that lead-based paint was not a fungible product and therefore, some of the manufacturers may not have been responsible for Skipworth's injuries.

== Sources ==
- Epstein, Richard A. Cases and Materials on Torts, 8th edition. New York: Aspen Publishers, 2004
- Gifford, Donald G. Suing the Tobacco and Lead Pigment Industries: Government Litigation as Public Health Prescription Ann Arbor: University of Michigan Press, 2010. ISBN 978-0-472-11714-7
