= Viasystems (Tyneside) Ltd v Thermal Transfer (Northern) Ltd =

Multiple employers, vicarious liability for workers

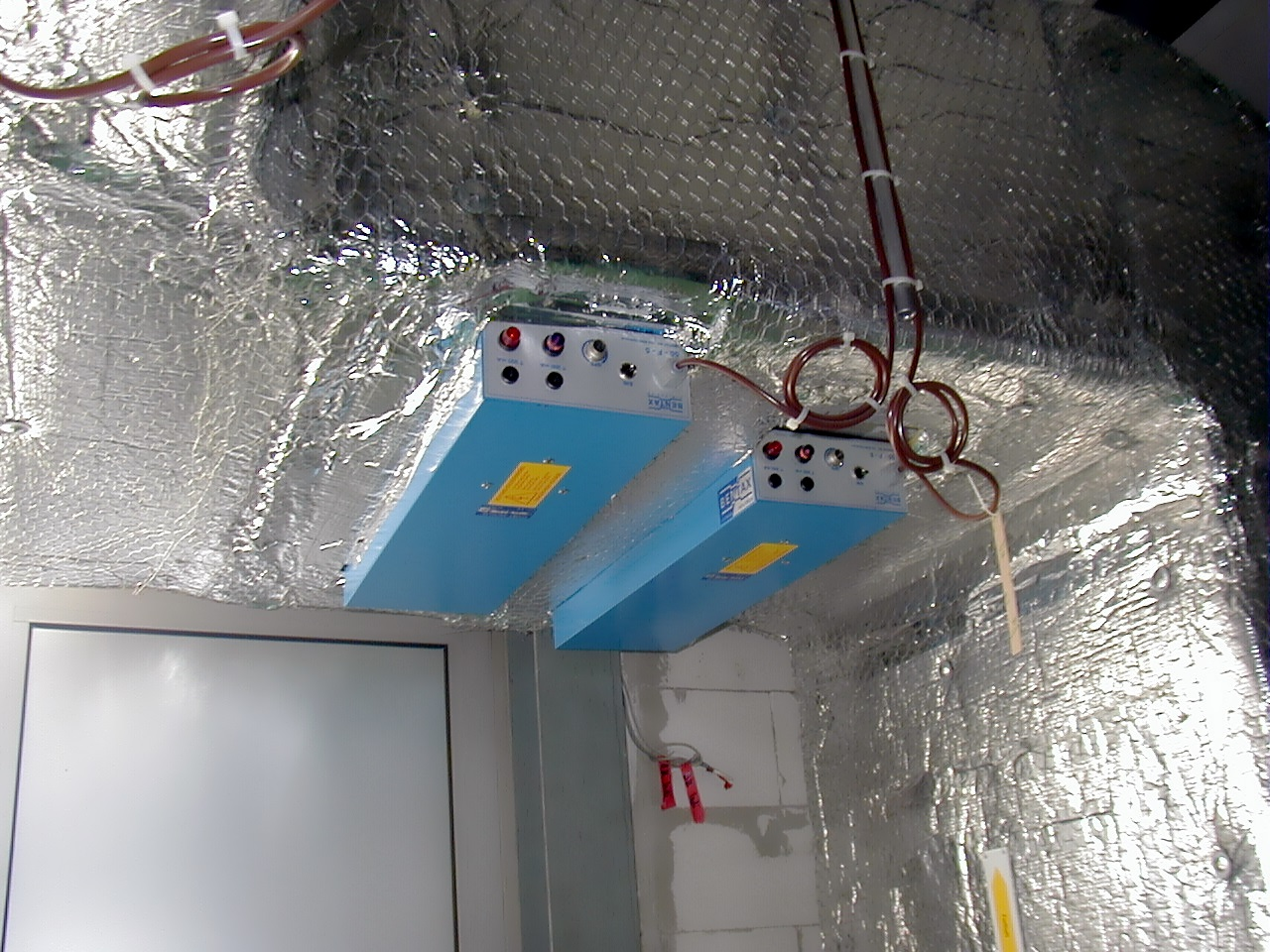
- Court: Court of Appeal
- Citations: [2005] EWCA Civ 1151, [2006] ICR 327

Viasystems (Tyneside) Ltd v Thermal Transfer (Northern) Ltd [2005] EWCA Civ 1151 is an English tort law and UK labour law case, which held that a worker can have more than one employer at the same time, who will be vicariously liable for the worker.

== Facts ==
Viasystems Ltd, a printed circuit board manufacturer with two factories in Tyneside, sued for damages for a flood, caused while Thermal Transfer Ltd had installed an air conditioning in their factory on Eldon Street, South Shields. Thermal Transfer Ltd subcontracted to S&P Darwell Ltd, which subcontracted to CAT Metalwork Services, which hired young Darren Strang. Darren made ‘a foolish mistake on the spur of the moment’ by climbing down from a roof, where he was sent by his workmate to get fittings, through a duct. He was meant to use crawling boards and roof purlins. The duct collapsed, hit a sprinkler, and flooded the site. Viasystems sued Thermal, S&P Darwell and CAT Metalwork, while Thermal brought an action for contribution against S&P Darwell and CAT Metalwork.

== Judgment ==
The Court of Appeal held that the defendants were jointly and equally liable, and suggested that the entity which most directly employed Darren was liable first.

May LJ noted that Prof Atiyah Vicarious Liability in the Law of Torts (1967) 156 in a chapter called ‘The Borrowed Servant’ suggested that both the general and temporary employer could be considered vicariously liable. After reviewing the history and noting that different jurisdictions diverged (Pennsylvania though in particular allows dual liability) He noted that multiplicity of claims (the old justification) is no longer an impediment in a modern context (at 49). So the control test would be applied and under the Civil Liability (Contribution) Act 1978 section 2 each of the second and third defendants (S&P Darwell and CAT Metalwork) would be liable in equal share, because they were entitled and obliged to control. He said the following.

18. [...] the core question on the facts of this case is who was entitled, and in theory, if they had had the opportunity, obliged, so to control Darren as to stop him crawling through the duct. In my judgment, the only sensible answer to that question in this case is that both Mr Megson and Mr Horsley were entitled, and in theory obliged, to stop Darren's foolishness. Mr Megson was the fitter in charge of Darren. Mr Horsley was the foreman on the spot.

[...]

46. In summary, therefore, there has been a long-standing assumption, technically unsupported by authority binding this court, that a finding of dual vicarious liability is not legally permissible. An assumption of such antiquity should not lightly be brushed aside, but the contrary has scarcely been argued and never considered in depth. This is not surprising, because in many, perhaps most, factual situations, a proper application of the Mersey Docks principles would not yield dual control, as it so plainly does in the present case. I am sceptical whether any of the cases from this jurisdiction which I have considered would, if they were re-examined, yield dual vicarious liability. Even Mileham is not transparent.

47. I conclude below in considering contribution that, if the relevant relationships yield dual control, it is highly likely at least that the measure of control will be equal. An equal measure of control will not often arise. Dual vicarious liability is most unlikely to be a possibility if one of the candidates for such liability is also personally at fault. It would be entirely redundant, if both were.

48. Academic commentary tends to favour the possibility of dual vicarious liability, but feels that authority constrains it. Other jurisdictions have reacted variously, giving no clear lead. Their decisions range from articulating the assumption to favouring or adopting dual liability.

49. In my judgment, there is, in a modern context, little intrinsic sense in, or justification for, the assumption. Multiplicity of claims is not a modern impediment. A contest between two defendants, where only one could be liable, is just as likely as a claim against the same two defendants, if both could be liable. The underlying basis for the assumption appears to be the notion, exposed as a device by Denning LJ in Denham, that, to find a temporary employer vicariously liable, you have to look for a transfer of employment. Although the nature and incidence of the employee's employment is plainly material, I do not read Mersey Docks as saying that these are the determinative matters in all cases. If, on the facts of a particular case, the core question is who was entitled, and in theory obliged, to control the employee's relevant negligent act so as to prevent it, there will be some cases in which the sensible answer would be each of two "employers". The present is such a case. In my judgment, dual vicarious liability should be a legal possibility, and I would hold that it is. It follows that I would allow this appeal to the extent of holding each of the second and third defendants vicarious liable for Darren Strang's negligence.

Rix LJ (at 79-80) thought that the control test would be sufficient, and cited the idea that vicarious liability is a doctrine there because the employer ‘benefits’ (while May LJ spoke of risk spreading, at 55). He noted (at 76) that there was (1) a principle that a servant could not have two masters (2) that there was a danger of a multiplicity of actions. He said the following.

83. It is clear that both employers are liable to the claimants in respect of the same damage. What is the just and equitable amount that each should contribute having regard to the extent of the responsibility of each for the damage in question?

84. It has been established that "responsibility" includes both causative potency and blameworthiness. However, in the case of vicarious liability, the employer is liable without personal fault. The fault in question is the employee's. The employer thus stands fully in the shoes of the negligent employee as regards both aspects of responsibility: see Dubai Aluminium Co Ltd [2002] UKHL 48, [2003] 2 AC 366 at paras 47 and 160.

85. Where, therefore, there is dual vicarious liability arising out of the negligence of a single employee, it follows that the responsibility of each employer for the purposes of contribution must be equal. In other words, in the absence of any personal fault on the part of either employer in respect of the same damage, and in the absence of any other negligence by another employee contributing to the same damage, as here in the absence of any negligence by either Mr Megson or Mr Horsley, the essential decision as regards contribution as well as liability occurs at the time when the court determines that there is dual vicarious liability. The realisation that dual vicarious liability means equal responsibility and equal financial liability could and probably should therefore enter into the earlier and determinative decision. The question would be whether in all the circumstances, including the important question of control, vicarious liability should be shared, on the basis that the employee in question, although not formally the employee of the temporary employer, is, at least for relevant purposes, so much a part of the work, business or organisation of both employers as to make it just for there to be dual and shared liability.

== See also ==
- English tort law
- UK labour law
