= Bolitho v City and Hackney HA =

English tort law case

- Court: House of Lords
- Decided: 13 November 1997
- Citation: [1998] AC 232; [1997] 3 WLR 1151; [1997] 4 All ER 771
- Transcript: https://publications.parliament.uk/pa/ld199798/ldjudgmt/jd971113/boli01.htm

Court membership
- Judges sitting: Lord Browne-Wilkinson; Lord Slynn of Hadley; Lord Nolan; Lord Hoffmann; Lord Clyde

Keywords
- standard of care, breach of duty, bolam test, professional negligence

Bolitho v City and Hackney Health Authority [1998] AC 232; [1997] 3 WLR 1151; [1997] 4 All ER 771 is an important English tort law case, on the standard of care required by medical specialists. It follows the Bolam test for professional negligence, and addresses the interaction with the concept of causation.

== Facts ==
Patrick Bolitho, a two-year-old boy, was suffering from croup. He was admitted into St Bartholomew's Hospital and was placed under the care of Dr Horn (the senior registrar) and Dr Rodger. Dr Rodger was concerned and arranged for him to be nursed by a special nurse on a one-to-one basis. Patrick had two respiratory episodes where he went pale and his breathing became "noisy". Dr Horn was notified but did not attend to Patrick. However, following each episode Patrick seemed well and was 'jumping' around. Half an hour after the second episode, Patrick suffered both a respiratory arrest and a cardiac arrest. Although he was revived, he suffered severe brain damage and later died.

Patrick's mother, as administratrix of his estate, sued the local health authority for negligence. She argued that Patrick would have lived if he had been intubated. On the health authority's side, it was admitted that Dr Horn had breached her duty of care in not coming to see Patrick. But Dr Horn argued that even if she had come to see Patrick, she would not have intubated him, and such a decision would have been consistent with a respectable body of professional opinion. Therefore, Dr. Horn's argument was that her breach of duty did not cause Patrick's death.

== Judgment ==
As per Lord Browne-Wilkinson, the House of Lords held that "a defendant cannot escape liability by saying that the damage would have occurred in any event because he would have committed some other breach of duty thereafter". So there was a need to decide if the hypothetical decision not to intubate Patrick would have been a breach of duty. The Bolam test says that an action cannot be a breach of duty if it conforms with a reasonable body of professional opinion. The professional opinion relied upon cannot be unreasonable or illogical. If the opinion were illogical, then the action would still be a breach of duty. Only in "a rare case" would the courts find that the body of opinion is unreasonable.

A group of eight medical experts testified in the case at first instance. Five of them said they would have intubated Patrick after the second episode, let alone the first. Three of them said they would not have. All the experts agreed that intubation is not a routine, risk-free process. Especially on a young child as they must be anaesthetised and ventilated. Dr. Roberton described it as "a major undertaking--an invasive procedure with mortality and morbidity attached". "A young child does not tolerate a tube easily and the child unless sedated tends to remove it." One of the experts stated that Patrick's recovery after each episode did not show a progressive respiratory collapse and that there was only a small risk of total respiratory failure.

Mr Justice Hutchinson, the judge in the original trial, said that as a "layman" he would have thought intubation was the correct procedure (as did five of the experts). However, he did not think the testimony of the other three experts was "unreasonable" or "illogical" therefore he could not dismiss them.

The original judge also concluded that Dr Horn failing to go and attend to Patrick did not cause his death. If Dr Horn had come to see Patrick, she would not have intubated him. That decision would have been supported by a body of professional opinion. Therefore she was not negligent.

The claim was dismissed as causation must be proved to bring a claim in negligence and there was no causation here.

== Commentary ==
The House of Lords decision in Bolitho seems to be a departure from the old Bolam test established by the Queen's Bench Division in a 1957 case Bolam v. Friern Hospital Management Committee. According to that test, which has been criticised by academic commentators, a doctor would not have acted negligently if his actions conformed to a practice supported by a body of professional opinion. However, the court in Bolitho did not specify in what circumstances it would be prepared to hold that the doctor has breached his duty of care by following a practice supported by a body of professional opinion, other than stating that such a case will be "rare".

== See also ==
- Negligence
- Bolam test
