= Chester v Afshar =

2004 English clinical negligence case

- Court: House of Lords
- Full case name: Chester v Afshar
- Decided: 14 October 2004
- Citations: [2004] UKHL 41 [2005] 1 AC 134 [2004] 3 WLR 927 [2004] 4 All ER 587

Case history
- Appealed from: Court of Appeal

Court membership
- Judges sitting: Lord Bingham; Lord Steyn; Lord Hoffmann; Lord Hope; Lord Walker

Keywords
- Causation (law) - Medical negligence - Tort law

Chester v Afshar [2004] UKHL 41 is an important English tort law case regarding causation in a medical negligence context. In it, the House of Lords decided that when a doctor fails to inform a patient of the risks of surgery, it is not necessary to show that the failure to inform caused the harm incurred. Rather, the failure to provide informed consent is sufficient in itself to claim for damages.

== Facts ==
Miss Chester was referred to Dr Afshar, a neurological expert, about some lower back pain. He told her that surgery was a solution, but did not inform her of the 1-2% risk of these operations going wrong. She suffered a complication, called cauda equina syndrome. The judge found that there was a causal connection between the failure to inform and Miss Chester's injuries—if she had been informed, she would have sought further advice or alternatives. In the Court of Appeal, Hale LJ, Sir Christopher Slade and Sir Denis Henry upheld the conclusion of the judge. At appeal, the House of Lords affirmed the lower courts decision.

== Judgment ==
Lord Steyn, Lord Hope and Lord Walker held that the "but for" test was satisfied on the grounds that but for Dr Afshar's failure to inform, Chester would not have undergone the specific surgery performed. In spite of the innate risk of surgery, even if Chester would have undergone the surgery on a later date, she may not have suffered the complication.

Although the risk of the operation going wrong would not at all have been changed had Miss Chester been warned, it was the duty of the doctor to warn her. It is a basic principle of good medical practice that adults should consent on a fully informed basis to surgery, aware of all risks. Dr Afshar had therefore violated her right to choose.

Lord Steyn argued that such a right "must be given effective protection whenever possible", warranting a "modest departure from traditional causation principles", emphasising his view by quoting Ronald Dworkin:

The value of autonomy, on this view, derives from the capacity it protects: the capacity to express one's own character - values, commitments, convictions, and critical as well as experiential interests - in the life one leads. Recognizing an individual right of autonomy makes self-creation possible. It allows each of us to be responsible for shaping our lives according to our own coherent or incoherent - but, in any case, distinctive - personality. It allows us to lead our lives rather than be led along them, so that each of us can be, to the extent a scheme of rights can make this possible, what we have made of ourselves. We allow someone to choose death over radical amputation or a blood transfusion, if that is his informed wish, because we acknowledge his right to a life structured by his own values.

Lord Walker finished his speech with the comment,

I agree with Lord Steyn and Lord Hope that such a claimant ought not to be without a remedy, even if it involves some extension of existing principle, as in Fairchild v. Glenhaven Funeral Services Ltd [2003] 1 AC 32 (see especially the speech of my noble and learned friend Lord Bingham of Cornhill at paras 8-13). Otherwise the surgeon's important duty would in many cases be drained of its content.

== Dissent ==
Lord Bingham felt that even though Dr Afshar had been found not to have informed Miss Chester about the 1–2% risk of surgery failure, this did not mean that causation had been shown. It was necessary to say that if Miss Chester had been informed of the risk, that she would not have undertaken the operation at all. The risk was inherent in surgery, no matter who performed it. Lord Bingham stated of the rules of causation generally:

It is now, I think, generally accepted that the "but for" test does not provide a comprehensive or exclusive test of causation in the law of tort... But, in the ordinary run of cases, satisfying the "but for" test is a necessary if not a sufficient condition of establishing causation. Here, in my opinion, it is not satisfied. Miss Chester has not established that but for the failure to warn she would not have undergone surgery. She has shown that but for the failure to warn she would not have consented to surgery on Monday 21 November 1994. But the timing of the operation is irrelevant to the injury she suffered, for which she claims to be compensated. That injury would have been as liable to occur whenever the surgery was performed and whoever performed it.

Lord Hoffmann started his judgment with a direct answer:

The purpose of a duty to warn someone against the risk involved in what he proposes to do, or allow to be done to him, is to give him the opportunity to avoid or reduce that risk. If he would have been unable or unwilling to take that opportunity and the risk eventuates, the failure to warn has not caused the damage. It would have happened anyway.

He later continues:

In my opinion this argument is about as logical as saying that if one had been told, on entering a casino, that the odds on No 7 coming up at roulette were only 1 in 37, one would have gone away and come back next week or gone to a different casino. The question is whether one would have taken the opportunity to avoid or reduce the risk, not whether one would have changed the scenario in some irrelevant detail. The judge found as a fact that the risk would have been precisely the same whether it was done then or later or by that competent surgeon or by another.

== See also ==
- Negligence
- Montgomery v Lanarkshire Health Board
