= Whitehouse v Jordan =

Whitehouse v Jordan [1981] 1 All ER 267: The claimant was a baby born in Birmingham who suffered severe brain damage after a difficult birth. The defendant, a senior hospital registrar, was supervising delivery in a high-risk pregnancy. After the mother had been in labour for 22 hours, the defendant used forceps to assist the delivery.

The Lords found that the doctor's standard of care did not fall below that of a reasonable doctor in the circumstances, and so the baby was awarded no compensation.

It has been called a "leading case in medical negligence". Perhaps the most surprising legacy of the case has been its use of Bayes' theorem from statistics.

== See also ==
- Negligence
