= Summers v. Tice =

- Supreme Court of California

Decided November 17, 1948
- Full case name: Charles A. Summers v. Howard W. Tice, et al.
- Citation(s): 33 Cal. 2d 80; 199 P.2d 1

Holding
- When a plaintiff suffers a single indivisible injury, for which the negligence of each of several potential tortfeasors could have been a but-for cause, but only one of which could have actually been the cause, all the potential tortfeasors are jointly and severally liable to the plaintiff.

Court membership
- Chief Justice: Phil S. Gibson
- Associate Justices: John W. Shenk, Douglas L. Edmonds, Jesse W. Carter, Roger J. Traynor, B. Rey Schauer, Homer R. Spence

Case opinions
- Majority: Carter, joined by unanimous

Summers v. Tice, 33 Cal. 2d 80, 199 P.2d 1 (1948), is a seminal California Supreme Court tort law decision relating to the issue of liability where a plaintiff cannot identify with specificity which among multiple defendants caused his harm. The case established the doctrine of alternative liability and has had its greatest influence in the area of product liability in American jurisprudence.

== Background ==
In Summers the plaintiff, Charles A. Summers, accompanied defendants Tice and Simonson as a guide on a quail hunt on November 20, 1945. Each of the defendants was armed with a 12 gauge shotgun loaded with shells containing 7 1/2 size shot. Prior to going hunting plaintiff discussed the hunting procedure with defendants, indicating that they were to exercise care when shooting and to "keep in line." Plaintiff advanced ahead of the defendants up a hill, creating a triangle among the three men, with plaintiff front and center. The view of both defendants with respect to Summers was unobstructed, and both defendants knew his location, 75 yards from each of them. A quail flew to a 10-foot elevation above the plaintiff's head (approximately four feet higher than the plaintiff's head), both defendants shot at the quail, and bird shot struck plaintiff in his right eye and another in his upper lip.

Plaintiff sued both defendants for personal injuries. At trial it was established that each of two pellets had caused the injuries to plaintiff's lip and eye, respectively, and both might have been discharged from a single weapon (defendant) or each defendant may have contributed one of the injuring pellets. The trial court found that the defendants were negligent (i.e., that when they discharged their weapons they did not do so with ordinary prudence), and that the plaintiff was not contributorily negligent. The defendants appealed.

== California Supreme Court ruling ==
On appeal the defendants argued that they were not joint tortfeasors because they were not acting in concert. On the subject of negligence, defendant Simonson contended that the evidence was insufficient to sustain the finding on that score. The court ruled that Simonson did not however point out wherein the plaintiff's evidence was lacking. Defendant Tice on the other hand stated in his opening brief that "we have decided not to argue the insufficiency of negligence on the part of defendant Tice." The court noted that Tice neither conceded the point nor argued it in his petition for a hearing before the court and the court therefore did not address that issue further. Accordingly, in their view, neither was liable, and they could not be held jointly and severally liable (i.e., each defendant was liable for the full amount of damages).

The court affirmed the lower court ruling that each defendant's behavior fell below the standard of care (i.e., they were both negligent) and that the plaintiff's conduct did not contribute to his injury. Laying out the groundbreaking doctrine of alternative liability, because both defendants had been negligent, the court then decided that justice required that the burden of proving which of the defendants had caused either or both of plaintiff's injuries be shifted to the defendants, so that either could absolve himself of liability if possible. This is because it would have been impossible for the plaintiff to show which of the two negligent actors had caused his harm. Summers v. Tice has had enormous precedential impact within the state of California and persuasive authority in other jurisdictions in the area of product liability.

== See also ==
- Missouri v. Holland
