= Proximate cause =

Event deemed by law to be the effective cause of an injury

In law and insurance, a proximate cause is an event sufficiently related to an injury that the courts deem the event to be the cause of that injury. There are two types of causation in the law: cause-in-fact, and proximate (or legal) cause. Cause-in-fact is determined by the "but for" test: But for the action, the result would not have happened. For example, in the case of a traffic collision, it could be established that if a car had not run a red light ("but for running the red light"), the collision would not have occurred. The action is a necessary condition, but may not be a sufficient condition, for the resulting injury. A few circumstances exist where the but-for test is ineffective (see But-for test below). Since but-for causation is very easy to show (but for stopping to tie your shoe, you would not have missed the train and would not have been mugged), a second test is used to determine if an action is close enough to a harm in a "chain of events" to be legally valid. This test is called proximate cause. Proximate cause is a key principle of insurance and is concerned with how the loss or damage actually occurred. There are several competing theories of proximate cause (see Other factors). For an act to be deemed to cause a harm, both tests must be met; therefore, proximate cause is a legal limitation on cause-in-fact.

The formal Latin term for "but for" (cause-in-fact) causation, is sine qua non causation.

== But-for test ==
A few circumstances exist where the "but for" test is complicated, or the test is ineffective. The primary examples are:

- Concurrent causes. Where two separate acts of negligence combine to cause an injury to a third party, each actor is liable. For example, a construction worker negligently leaves the cover off a manhole, and a careless driver negligently clips a pedestrian, forcing the pedestrian to fall into the open manhole. Both the construction worker and the careless driver are equally liable for the injury to the pedestrian. This example obeys the but for test. The injury could have been avoided by the elimination of either act of negligence, thus each is a but for cause of the injury.
- Sufficient combined causes. Where an injury results from two separate acts of negligence, either of which would have been sufficient to cause the injury, both actors are liable. For example, two campers in different parts of the woods negligently leave their campfires unattended. A forest fire results, but the same amount of property damage would have resulted from either fire. Both campers are equally liable for all damage. A famous case establishing this principle in the United States is Corey v. Havener.
- In the United States, the rule of Summers v. Tice holds that where two parties have acted negligently, but only one causes an injury to a third party, the burden shifts to the negligent parties to prove that they were not the cause of the injury. In that case, two hunters negligently fired their shotguns in the direction of their guide, and a pellet lodged in his eye. Because it was impossible to tell which hunter fired the shot that caused the injury, the court held both hunters liable.
- Market share evidence. Injury or illness is occasioned by a fungible product made by all the manufacturers joined in a lawsuit. The injury or illness is due to a design hazard, with each having been found to have sold the same type of product in a manner that made it unreasonably dangerous, there is inability to identify the specific manufacturer of the product or products that brought about the Plaintiff's injury or illness and there are enough manufacturers of the fungible product joined in the lawsuit, to represent a substantial share of the market. Any damages would then be divided according to the market share ratio.

Since but-for causation is very easy to show and does not assign culpability (but for the rain, you would not have crashed your car – the rain is not morally or legally culpable but still constitutes a cause), there is a second test used to determine if an action is close enough to a harm in a "chain of events" to be a legally culpable cause of the harm. This test is called proximate cause, from the Latin causa proxima.

== Other factors ==
There are several competing theories of proximate cause.

=== Foreseeability ===
The most common test of proximate cause under the American legal system is foreseeability. It determines if the harm resulting from an action could reasonably have been predicted. The test is used in most cases only in respect to the type of harm. It is foreseeable, for example, that throwing a baseball at someone could cause them a blunt-force injury. But proximate cause is still met if a thrown baseball misses the target and knocks a heavy object off a shelf behind them, which causes a blunt-force injury.

This is also known as the "extraordinary in hindsight" rule.

In the United Kingdom, a "threefold test" of foreseeability of damage, proximity of relationship and reasonableness was established in the case of Caparo v Dickman (1990) and adopted in the litigation between Lungowe and others and Vedanta Resources plc (Supreme Court ruling 2019).

=== Direct causation ===
Direct causation is a minority test, which addresses only the metaphysical concept of causation. It does not matter how foreseeable the result as long as what the negligent party's physical activity can be tied to what actually happened. The main thrust of direct causation is that there are no intervening causes between an act and the resulting harm. An intervening cause has several requirements: it must 1) be independent of the original act, 2) be a voluntary human act or an abnormal natural event, and 3) occur in time between the original act and the harm.

Direct causation is the only theory that addresses only causation and does not take into account the culpability of the original actor.

=== Risk enhancement/causal link ===
The plaintiff must demonstrate that the defendant's action increased the risk that the particular harm suffered by the plaintiff would occur. If the action were repeated, the likelihood of the harm would correspondingly increase. This is also called foreseeable risk.

=== Harm within the risk ===
The harm within the risk (HWR) test determines whether the victim was among the class of persons who could foreseeably be harmed, and whether the harm was foreseeable within the class of risks. It is the strictest test of causation, made famous by Benjamin Cardozo in Palsgraf v. Long Island Railroad Co. case under New York state law.

The first element of the test is met if the injured person was a member of a class of people who could be expected to be put at risk of injury by the action. For example, a pedestrian, as an expected user of sidewalks, is among the class of people put at risk by driving on a sidewalk, whereas a driver who is distracted by another driver driving on the sidewalk, and consequently crashes into a utility pole, is not.

The HWR test is no longer much used, outside of New York law. When it is used, it is used to consider the class of people injured, not the type of harm. The main criticism of this test is that it is preeminently concerned with culpability, rather than actual causation.

=== The "Risk Rule" ===
Referred to by the Reporters of the Second and Third Restatements of the Law of Torts as the "scope-of-the-risk" test, the term "Risk Rule" was coined by the University of Texas School of Law's Dean Robert Keeton. The rule is that “[a]n actor’s liability is limited to those physical harms that result from the risks that made the actor’s conduct tortious.” Thus, the operative question is "what were the particular risks that made an actor's conduct negligent?" If the injury suffered is not the result of one of those risks, there can be no recovery. Two examples will illustrate this principle:

- The classic example is that of a father who gives his child a loaded gun, which she carelessly drops upon the plaintiff's foot, causing injury. The plaintiff argues that it is negligent to give a child a loaded gun and that such negligence caused the injury, but this argument fails, for the injury did not result from the risk that made the conduct negligent. The risk that made the conduct negligent was the risk of the child accidentally firing the gun; the harm suffered could just as easily have resulted from handing the child an unloaded gun.
- Another example familiar to law students is that of the restaurant owner who stores rat poison above the grill in his luncheonette. The story is that during the lunch rush, the can explodes, severely injuring the chef who is preparing food in the kitchen. The chef sues the owner for negligence. The chef may not recover. Storing rat poison above the grill was negligent because it involved the risk that the chef might inadvertently mistake it for a spice and use it as an ingredient in a recipe. The explosion of the container and subsequent injury to the chef was not what made the chosen storage space risky.

The notion is that it must be the risk associated with the negligence of the conduct that results in an injury, not some other risk invited by aspects of the conduct that in of themselves would not be negligent.

== Controversy ==
The doctrine of proximate cause is notoriously confusing. The doctrine is phrased in the language of causation, but in most of the cases in which proximate cause is actively litigated, there is not much real dispute that the defendant but-for caused the plaintiff's injury. The doctrine is actually used by judges in a somewhat arbitrary fashion to limit the scope of the defendant's liability to a subset of the total class of potential plaintiffs who may have suffered some harm from the defendant's actions.

For example, in the two famous Kinsman Transit cases from the 2nd Circuit (exercising admiralty jurisdiction over a New York incident), it was clear that mooring a boat improperly could lead to the risk of that boat drifting away and crashing into another boat, and that both boats could crash into a bridge, which collapsed and blocked the river, and in turn, the wreckage could flood the land adjacent to the river, as well as prevent any traffic from traversing the river until it had been cleared. But under proximate cause, the property owners adjacent to the river could sue (Kinsman I), but not the owners of the boats or cargoes which could not move until the river was reopened (Kinsman II).

Therefore, in the final version of the Restatement (Third), Torts: Liability for Physical and Emotional Harm, published in 2010, the American Law Institute argued that proximate cause should be replaced with scope of liability. Chapter 6 of the Restatement is titled "Scope of Liability (Proximate Cause)." It begins with a special note explaining the institute's decision to reframe the concept in terms of "scope of liability" because it does not involve true causation, and to also include "proximate cause" in the chapter title in parentheses to help judges and lawyers understand the connection between the old and new terminology. The Institute added that it "fervently hopes" the parenthetical will be unnecessary in a future fourth Restatement of Torts.

== Efficient proximate cause ==
A related doctrine is the insurance law doctrine of efficient proximate cause. Under this rule, in order to determine whether a loss resulted from a cause covered under an insurance policy, a court looks for the predominant cause which sets into motion the chain of events producing the loss, which may not necessarily be the last event that immediately preceded the loss. Many insurers have attempted to contract around efficient proximate cause through the use of "anti-concurrent causation" (ACC) clauses, under which if a covered cause and a noncovered cause join to cause a loss, the loss is not covered.

ACC clauses frequently come into play in jurisdictions where property insurance does not normally include flood insurance and expressly excludes coverage for floods. The classic example of how ACC clauses work is where a hurricane hits a building with wind and flood hazards at the same time. If the evidence later shows that the wind blew off a building's roof and then water damage resulted only because there was no roof to prevent rain from entering, there would be coverage, but if the building was simultaneously flooded (i.e., because the rain caused a nearby body of water to rise or simply overwhelmed local sewers), an ACC clause would completely block coverage for the entire loss (even if the building owner could otherwise attribute damage to wind v. flood).

A minority of jurisdictions have ruled ACC clauses to be unenforceable as against public policy, but they are generally enforceable in the majority of jurisdictions.

== See also ==
- Sine qua non (but-for causation)
- Four causes
- Causation
- Pretext
