= Causation (law) =

Causal relationship between conduct and result

Causation is the "causal relationship between the defendant's conduct and end result". In other words, causation provides a means of connecting conduct with a resulting effect, typically an injury. In criminal law, it is defined as the actus reus (an action) from which the specific injury or other effect arose and is combined with mens rea (a state of mind) to comprise the elements of guilt. Causation applies only where a result has been achieved and therefore is immaterial with regard to inchoate offenses.

== Background concepts ==
Legal systems more or less try to uphold the notions of fairness and justice. If a state is going to penalize a person or require that person pay compensation to another for losses incurred, liability is imposed according to the idea that those who injure others should take responsibility for their actions. Although some parts of any legal system will have qualities of strict liability, in which the mens rea is immaterial to the result and subsequent liability of the actor, most look to establish liability by showing that the defendant was the cause of the particular injury or loss.

Even the youngest children quickly learn that, with varying degrees of probability, consequences flow from physical acts and omissions. The more predictable the outcome, the greater the likelihood that the actor caused the injury or loss intentionally. There are many ways in which the law might capture this simple rule of practical experience: that there is a natural flow to events, that a reasonable man in the same situation would have foreseen this consequence as likely to occur, that the loss flowed naturally from the breach of contractual duties or tortuous actions, etc. However it is phrased, the essence of the degree of fault attributed will lie in the fact that reasonable people try to avoid injuring others, so if harm was foreseeable, there should be liability to the extent that the extent of the harm actually resulting was foreseeable.

=== Relationship between causation and liability ===
Causation of an event alone is insufficient to create legal liability.

Sometimes causation is one part of a multi-stage test for legal liability. For example, for the defendant to be held liable for the tort of negligence, the defendant must have owed the plaintiff a duty of care, breached that duty, by so doing caused damage to the plaintiff, and that damage must not have been too remote. Causation is just one component of the tort.

On other occasions, causation is the only requirement for legal liability (other than the fact that the outcome is proscribed). For example, in the law of product liability, the courts have come to apply to principle of strict liability: the fact that the defendant's product caused the plaintiff harm is the only thing that matters. The defendant need not also have been negligent.

On still other occasions, causation is irrelevant to legal liability altogether. For example, under a contract of indemnity insurance, the insurer agrees to indemnify the victim for harm not caused by the insurer, but by other parties.

Because of the difficulty in establishing causation, it is one area of the law where the case law overlaps significantly with general doctrines of analytic philosophy to do with causation. The two subjects have long been intermingled.

== Establishing causation ==
Where establishing causation is required to establish legal liability, it usually involves a two-stage inquiry, firstly establishing 'factual' causation, then legal (or proximate) causation. Factual causation must be established before inquiring into legal or proximate causation.

== Establishing factual causation ==
The usual method of establishing factual causation is the but-for test. The but for test inquires "But for the defendant's act, would the harm have occurred?" A shoots and wounds B. We ask "But for A's act, would B have been wounded?" The answer is "No." So we conclude that A caused the harm to B. The but for test is a test of necessity. It asks was it "necessary" for the defendant's act to have occurred for the harm to have occurred. In New South Wales, this requirement exists in s 5D of the Civil Liability Act 2002 (NSW), reinforcing established common law principles.

One weakness in the but-for test arises in situations where each of several acts alone are sufficient to cause the harm. For example, if both A and B fire what would alone be fatal shots at C at approximately the same time, and C dies, it becomes impossible to say that but-for A's shot, or but-for B's shot alone, C would have died. Taking the but-for test literally in such a case would seem to make neither A nor B responsible for C's death.

The courts have generally accepted the but for test notwithstanding these weaknesses, qualifying it by saying that causation is to be understood "as the man in the street" would, or by supplementing it with "common sense".

This dilemma was handled in the United States in State v. Tally, 15 So 722, 738 (Ala. 1894), where the court ruled that: "The assistance given ... need not contribute to criminal result in the sense that but for it the result would not have ensued. It is quite sufficient if it facilitated a result that would have transpired without it." Using this logic, A and B are liable in that no matter who was responsible for the fatal shot, the other "facilitated" the criminal act even though his shot was not necessary to deliver the fatal blow.

However, legal scholars have attempted to make further inroads into what explains these difficult cases. Some scholars have proposed a test of sufficiency instead of a test of necessity. H. L. A. Hart and Tony Honoré, and later Richard Wright, have said that something is a cause if it is a "necessary element of a set of conditions jointly sufficient for the result". This is known as the NESS test. In the case of the two hunters, the set of conditions required to bring about the result of the victim's injury would include a gunshot to the eye, the victim being in the right place at the right time, gravity, etc. In such a set, either of the hunters' shots would be a member, and hence a cause. This arguably gives us a more theoretically satisfying reason to conclude that something was a cause of something else than by appealing to notions of intuition or common sense.

Hart and Honore, in their famous work Causation in the Law, also tackle the problem of "too many causes". For them, there are degrees of causal contribution. A member of the NESS set is a "causally relevant condition". This is elevated into a "cause" where it is a deliberate human intervention, or an abnormal act in the context. So, returning to our hunter example, hunter A's grandmother's birth is a causally relevant condition, but not a "cause". On the other hand, hunter A's gunshot, being a deliberate human intervention in the ordinary state of affairs, is elevated to the status of "cause". An intermediate position can be occupied by those who "occasion" harm, such as accomplices. Imagine an accomplice to a murder who drives the principal to the scene of the crime. Clearly the principal's act in committing the murder is a "cause" (on the but for or NESS test). So is the accomplice's act in driving the principal to the scene of the crime. However, the causal contribution is not of the same level (and, incidentally, this provides some basis for treating principals and accomplices differently under criminal law). Leon Green and Jane Stapleton are two scholars who take the opposite view. They consider that once something is a "but for" (Green) or NESS (Stapleton) condition, that ends the factual inquiry altogether, and anything further is a question of policy.

== Establishing legal causation ==
Notwithstanding the fact that causation may be established in the above situations, the law often intervenes and says that it will nevertheless not hold the defendant liable because in the circumstances the defendant is not to be understood, in a legal sense, as having caused the loss. In the United States, this is known as the doctrine of proximate cause. The most important doctrine is that of novus actus interveniens, which means a 'new intervening act' which may "cut the chain of causation".

=== Proximate cause ===
The but-for test is factual causation and often gives us the right answer to causal problems, but sometimes not. Two difficulties are immediately obvious. The first is that under the but-for test, almost anything is a cause. But for a tortfeasor's grandmother's birth, the relevant tortious conduct would not have occurred. But for the victim of a crime missing the bus, he or she would not have been at the site of the crime and hence the crime would not have occurred. Yet in these two cases, the grandmother's birth or the victim's missing the bus are not intuitively causes of the resulting harm. This often does not matter in the case where cause is only one element of liability, as the remote actor will most likely not have committed the other elements of the test. The legally liable cause is the one closest to or most proximate to the injury. This is known as the Proximate Cause rule. However, this situation can arise in strict liability situations. Baker in the Glanville Williams and Dennis Baker Treatise of Criminal Law (LexisNexis, London, 2024) at paragraphs 10.9A to 10.9F argues that legal causation alone is sufficient establishing gross negligence manslaughter in duty to assist or prevent cases, since there is no way to know if the victim would have lived had the defendant done their duty and attempted to stop what was causing the victim's death by seeking help. Baker argues the case of R v Broughton [2020] EWCA Crim 1093 due to the issue of causal indeterminancy and the courts insistence that cause rest on it being provable that the victim would have lived had help being sought.

=== Intervening cause ===
Imagine the following. A critically injures B. As B is wheeled to an ambulance, she is struck by lightning. She would not have been struck if she had not been injured in the first place. Clearly then, A caused B's whole injury on the "but for" or NESS test. However, at law, the intervention of a supervening event renders the defendant not liable for the injury caused by the lightning.

The effect of the principle may be stated simply:

if the new event, whether through human agency or natural causes, does not break the chain, the original actor is liable for all the consequences flowing naturally from the initial circumstances. But if the new act breaks the chain, the liability of the initial actor stops at that point, and the new actor, if human, will be liable for all that flows from his or her contribution.

However, this does not apply if the Eggshell skull rule is used. Baker argues (Glanville Williams and Dennis Baker Treatise of Criminal Law (LexisNexis 2024) at paragraph 10.59 that the thin skull/ eggshell skull rule has no place in the criminal law and that even when appleid it will often have no effect since mens rea still needs to be established for the relevant offence and that most result crimes require mens rea. For details, see article on the Eggshell Skull doctrine.

=== Independent sufficient causes ===
When two or more negligent parties, where the consequence of their negligence joins to cause damages, in a circumstance where either one of them alone would have caused it anyway, each is deemed to be an "Independent Sufficient Cause," because each could be deemed a "substantial factor," and both are held legally responsible for the damages. For example, where negligent firestarter A's fire joins with negligent firestarter B's fire to burn down House C, both A and B are held responsible. (e.g., Anderson v. Minneapolis, St: P. & S. St. R.R. Co., 146 Minn. 430, 179 N.W. 45 (1920).) This is an element of Legal Cause.

=== Summers v. Tice Rule ===
The other problem is that of overdetermination. Imagine two hunters, A and B, who each negligently fire a shot that takes out C's eye. Each shot on its own would have been sufficient to cause the damage. But for A's shot, would C's eye have been taken out? Yes. The same answer follows in relation to B's shot. But on the but-for test, this leads us to the counterintuitive position that neither shot caused the injury. However, courts have held that in order to prevent each of the defendants avoiding liability for lack of actual cause, it is necessary to hold both of them responsible. This is known, simply, as the Summers v. Tice Rule.

=== Concurrent actual causes ===
Suppose that two actors' negligent acts combine to produce one set of damages, where but for either of their negligent acts, no damage would have occurred at all. This is two negligences contributing to a single cause, as distinguished from two separate negligences contributing to two successive or separate causes. These are "concurrent actual causes". In such cases, courts have held both defendants liable for their negligent acts. Example: A leaves truck parked in the middle of the road at night with its lights off. B fails to notice it in time and plows into it, where it could have been avoided, except for want of negligence, causing damage to both vehicles. Both parties were negligent. (Hill v. Edmonds, 26 A.D.2d 554, 270 N.Y.S.2d 1020 (1966).)

=== Foreseeability ===
Legal Causation is usually expressed as a question of 'foreseeability'. An actor is liable for the foreseeable, but not the unforeseeable, consequences of his or her act. For example, it is foreseeable that if I shoot someone on a beach and they are immobilized, they may drown in a rising tide rather than from the trauma of the gunshot wound or from loss of blood. However it is not (generally speaking) foreseeable that they will be struck by lightning and killed by that event.

This type of causal foreseeability is to be distinguished from foreseeability of extent or kind of injury, which is a question of remoteness of damage, not causation. For example, if I conduct welding work on a dock that lights an oil slick that destroys a ship a long way down the river, it would be hard to construe my negligence as anything other than causal of the ship's damage. There is no novus actus interveniens. However, I may not be held liable if that damage is not of a type foreseeable as arising from my negligence. That is a question of public policy, and not one of causation.

== Example ==
An example of how foreseeability does not apply to the extent of an injury is the eggshell skull rule. If Neal punched Matt in the jaw, it is foreseeable that Matt will suffer a bodily injury that he will need to go to the hospital for. However, if his jaw is very weak, and his jaw is dislocated by the punch, then the medical bills, which would have been about $5,000 for wiring his jaw shut had now become $100,000 for a full-blown jaw re-attachment. Neal would still be liable for the entire $100,000, even though $95,000 of those damages were not reasonably foreseeable.

== Other relevant considerations ==
Because causation in the law is a complex amalgam of fact and policy, other doctrines are also important, such as foreseeability and risk. Particularly in the United States, where the doctrine of 'proximate cause' effectively amalgamates the two-stage factual then legal causation inquiry favoured in the English system, one must always be alert to these considerations in assessing the postulated relationship between two events.

=== Foreseeability tests ===
Some aspects of the physical world are so inevitable that it is always reasonable to impute knowledge of their incidence. So if A abandons B on a beach, A must be taken to foresee that the tide comes in and goes out. But the mere fact that B subsequently drowns is not enough. A court would have to consider where the body was left and what level of injury A believed that B had suffered. If B was left in a position that any reasonable person would consider safe but a storm surge caused extensive flooding throughout the area, this might be a novus actus. That B was further injured by an event within a foreseen class does not of itself require a court to hold that every incident falling within that class is a natural link in the chain. Only those causes that are reasonably foreseeable fit naturally into the chain. So if A had heard a weather forecast predicting a storm, the drowning will be a natural outcome. But if this was an event like a flash flood, an entirely unpredictable event, it will be a novus actus.

The question of A's beliefs is no different. If A honestly believes that B is only slightly injured and so could move himself out of danger without difficulty, how fair is it to say that he ought to have foreseen? The test is what the reasonable person would have known and foreseen, given what A had done. It is the function of any court to evaluate behaviour. A defendant cannot evade responsibility through a form of willful blindness. Fault lies not only in what a person actually believes, but also in failing to understand what the vast majority of other people would have understood. Hence, the test is hybrid, looking both at what the defendant actually knew and foresaw (i.e. subjective), and at what the reasonable person would have known (i.e. objective) and then combining the conclusions into a general evaluation of the degree of fault or blameworthiness.

Similarly, in the quantification of damages generally and/or the partitioning of damages between two or more defendants, the extent of the liability to compensate the plaintiff(s) will be determined by what was reasonably foreseeable. So if, for example, the plaintiff unexpectedly contributed to the extent of the loss suffered, that additional element would not be included in the damages award even though the plaintiff would not have had the opportunity to make this mistake had it not been for the defendant's breach. In cases involving the partitioning of damages between multiple defendants, each will be liable to the extent that their contribution foreseeably produced the loss.

=== Risk ===
Sometimes the reverse situation to a novus actus occurs, i.e. factual causation cannot be proved but the court nevertheless does want to hold the defendant liable. In Sindell v. Abbott Laboratories, 607 P.2d 924 (Cal. 1980) the plaintiff's mother consumed diethylstilbestrol as a miscarriage preventive. The medicine, later recalled from the market, caused the defendant to develop a malignant bladder tumor due to its negligent manufacture. However, there were many manufacturers of that drug in the market. The manufacturer of the particular medication that caused the injury could not be ascertained for certain. The court held that the defendant was liable in proportion to its market share. They departed from traditional notions of pure cause and adopted a "risk based" approach to liability. The defendant was held liable because of the amount of risk it contributed to the occasioning of the harm. A risk theory is not strictly a theory built on notions of cause at all, as, by definition, the person who caused the injury could not be ascertained for certain. However, it does show that legal notions of causation are a complex mixture of factual causes and ideas of public policy relating to the availability of legal remedies. In R v Miller [1982] UKHL 6, the House of Lords said that a person who puts a person in a dangerous position, in that case a fire, will be criminally liable if he does not adequately rectify the situation.

=== Evidence proving causation ===
To be acceptable, any rule of law must be capable of being applied consistently, thus a definition of the criteria for this qualitative analysis must be supplied. Let us assume a purely factual analysis as a starting point. A injures B and leaves him lying in the road. C is a driver who fails to see B on the road and by running over him, contributes to the cause of his death. It would be possible to ask for a detailed medical evaluation at a post mortem to determine the initial degree of injury and the extent to which B's life was threatened, followed by a second set of injuries from the collision and their contribution. If the first incident merely damaged B's leg so that he could not move, it is tempting to assert that C's driving must have been the more substantial cause and so represents a novus actus breaking the chain. Equally, if B was bleeding to death and the only contribution that the driving made was to break B's arm, the driving is not a novus actus and does not break the chain. But this approach ignores the issue of A's foresight.

Roads are, by their nature, used by vehicles and it is clearly foreseeable that a person left lying on the road is at risk of being further injured by an inattentive driver. Hence, if A leaves B on the road with knowledge of that risk and a foreseeable event occurs, A remains the more proximate cause. This leaves whether the test of foresight should be subjective, objective or hybrid (i.e. both subjective and objective). Obviously, there is no difficulty in holding A liable if A had actual knowledge of the likelihood that B would be further injured by a driver. The fault which caused the initial injury is compounded by the omission to move B to a safer place or call for assistance. But let us assume that A never averts the possibility of further injury. The issue is now the extent to which knowledge may be imputed objectively.

== Emerging issues ==
A difficult issue that has arisen recently is the case where the defendant neither factually causes the harm, nor increases the risk of its occurrence. In Chester v Afshar [2004] 4 All ER 587 (HL), a doctor negligently failed to warn a patient of risks inherent in an operation, specifically cauda equina syndrome. The patient had the operation and a risk materialized causing injury. It was found that even if the patient had been warned, the patient would still have undergone the operation, simply at a different time. The risk of the injury would be the same at both times. Accordingly, the doctor neither caused the injury (because but for the failure to warn, the patient would still have gone ahead with the operation), nor increased the risk of its occurrence (because the risk was the same either way). Yet the House of Lords, embracing a more normative approach to causation, still held the doctor liable. Lawyers and philosophers continue to debate whether and how this changes the state of the law.

== English criminal case law examples ==
=== Novus actus interveniens ===
- Victim's contribution R v Dear (1996) CLR 595. Believing that the victim had sexually interfered with his 12-year-old daughter, the defendant attacked the victim with a Stanley knife. The defendant argued that the chain of causation had been broken because, two days later, the victim had committed suicide either by reopening his wounds or because he had failed to take steps to staunch the blood flow after the wounds had reopened spontaneously (i.e. the potential suicide constituted a novus actus interveniens). It was held that the real question was whether the injuries inflicted by the defendant were an operating and significant cause of or contribution to the death. Distinctions between the victim's mere self-neglect (no break in the chain) and the victim's gross self-neglect (break in the chain) were not helpful. The victim's death resulted from bleeding from the artery severed by the defendant. Whether the resumption or continuation of that bleeding was deliberately caused by the victim, the defendant's conduct remained the operative and significant cause of the victim's death. Baker argues (Glanville Williams and Dennis Baker Treatise of Criminal Law (2024) at paragraph 10.36B, that the causer has to be the cause of the victim's involuntary self-harm and that the self harm has to be involuntary to count, it cannot be free, informed and deliberate. In this sense, Baker argues that the deicsion in R v Rebelo [2021] 4 WLR 52 cannot be reconciled with R v Kennedy No 2 (2007). Baker points out that in Rebelo the victim's involuntary decision to ingest dangerous drugs was not due to the duress of the supplier and thus there was no chain of causation and therefore Rebelo was wrongly convicted of manslaughter.
- Third party's inadvertent contribution R v Smith (1959) 2 QB 35 the defendant stabbed his victim twice in a barrack room brawl. Another soldier carried him to the medical centre but dropped him twice. The medical captain was very busy and failed to recognise the extent of the injuries. If the soldier had received proper treatment, he would have had a good chance of a complete recovery. Smith was convicted of manslaughter because the wound was the "operating and substantial cause of death". In R v Cheshire (1991) 3 AER 670, the victim was shot in the leg and stomach. In hospital, he suffered pneumonia and respiratory problems in intensive care so had a tracheotomy. After two months, he died. There was some medical negligence because the tracheotomy had caused a thickening of tissue ultimately causing suffocation. In upholding the conviction for murder, Beldam LJ laid down the following test:

Even though negligence in the treatment of the victim was the immediate cause of his death, the jury should not regard it as excluding the responsibility of the accused unless the negligent treatment was so independent of his acts, and in itself so potent in causing death, that they regard the contribution made by his acts as insignificant.

- Third party's deliberate intervention R v Malcherek (1981) 73 Cr. App. R. 173. The victim was placed on a life support machine and, after determining that she was brain dead, the doctors turned off the machine. The defendant appealed the conviction of murder arguing that the doctors had broken the chain of causation by deliberately switching off the life support machine. It was held that the original wounds were the operating and substantial cause of death, and that a life support machine does no more than hold the effect of the injuries in suspension and when the machine is switched off, the original wounds continue to cause the death no matter how long the victim survives after the machine's disconnection. In R v Pagett (1983) 76 Cr. App. R. 279, to resist lawful arrest, the defendant held a girl in front of him as a shield and shot at armed policemen. The police instinctively fired back and killed the girl. The Court of Appeal held that the defendant's act caused the death and that the reasonable actions of a third party acting in self-defence could not be regarded as a novus actus interveniens because self-defence is a foreseeable consequence of his action and had not broken the chain of causation.

=== Foreseeability ===
- Victim's conscious actions R v. Blaue is a criminal law application of the "thin skull rule" in criminal law. The defendant visited the home of a Jehovah's Witness and demanded sex. When she refused, he stabbed her four times. At hospital, she refused a blood transfusion which would have saved her life. There was no suggestion that the doctors had acted improperly. Blaue was convicted of manslaughter by an unlawful act, namely wounding with intent. "But for" his actions, she would not have been faced with the choice about treatment and those who use violence on others must take their victims as they find them (albeit that he had known her religion and so her refusal was foreseeable).
