= Law review =

Type of scholarly journal focusing on legal issues

A law review or law journal is a scholarly journal or publication that focuses on legal issues. A law review is a type of legal periodical. Law reviews are a source of research, imbedded with analyzed and referenced legal topics; they also provide a scholarly analysis of emerging legal concepts from various topics. The primary function of a law review is to publish scholarship in the field of law. Law reviews publish lengthy, comprehensive treatments of subjects (referred to as "articles"), that are generally written by law professors, and to a lesser extent judges, or legal practitioners. The shorter pieces, attached to the articles, commonly called "notes" and "comments", often are written by law student members of the law review. Law review articles often express the thinking of specialists or experts with regard to problems, in a legal setting, with potential solutions to those problems. Historically, law review articles have been influential in the development of the law; they have been frequently cited as persuasive authority by courts. Some law schools publish specialized reviews, dealing with a particular area of the law, such as civil rights and civil liberties, international law, environmental law, and human rights. Some specialized reviews focus on statutory, regulatory, and public policy issues.

Law reviews are generated in almost all law bodies/institutions worldwide. In the United States and Canada, most law journals are housed at individual law schools and are edited by students, not professional scholars, which is unique of law schools. North American law schools usually have flagship law reviews and several secondary journals dedicated to specific topics. For example, Harvard Law School's flagship journal is the Harvard Law Review, and it has 16 other secondary journals such as the Harvard Journal of Law & Technology and the Harvard Civil Rights-Civil Liberties Law Review. Membership and editorial positions on law journals, especially flagship law reviews, is competitive and traditionally confers honor and prestige. Selection for law review membership is usually based on a combination of students' grades, their performance on a short article-writing competition, as well as an examination on Bluebook legal citation rules.

== By region ==
=== United States ===
In the US, law reviews are normally edited and published by an organization of students at a law school or through a bar association, in close collaboration with faculty members. Law reviews can provide insight and ideas that contribute to the bedrock of jurisprudence. For example, Justice Stanley Mosk of the Supreme Court of California admitted that he got the idea for market share liability from the Fordham Law Review comment cited extensively in the court's landmark decision in Sindell v. Abbott Laboratories (1980). A 2012 study found that the Supreme Court has increased its use of citing law journals and reviews over the last 61 years in majority, concurring or dissenting opinions, especially for important or difficult cases, despite claims by some judges to the contrary.

In addition to rankings that measure impact factor, a number of methods can be used to assess the notability of a law review. A professor at the University of Oregon School of Journalism and Communication averages the annual rankings of: the Washington and Lee University Law School rankings, the average US News Peer Reputation score from the last 10 years, the average ranking of the School in US News of the last 10 years, and Google Scholar metrics for all Law reviews in the United States. There has been a weak correlation between law school ranking and law review citation metrics.

In the United States, law reviews are typically edited by students who are selected to join after successfully completing a "write on competition" at the end of their first year of law school. Grades and class standing are often considered during the application process. Law professor Erwin N. Griswold noted the concern some have about the unusual nature of a publication being run by students and celebrated the impact that it has had in law and legal education. In 1995, Richard Posner argued law reviews had a higher standard of fact-checking to faculty-run journals or published books, and described them as indispensable resources for law clerks, judges, practitioners and professors. He also argued that faculty-run journals are generally better at aspects including article selection and editing interdisciplinary papers.

=== Canada ===
In Canada, the fully student-run law reviews (without a Faculty editor-in-chief) include, in order of the frequency they are cited by the Supreme Court of Canada: the McGill Law Journal, the Osgoode Hall Law Journal, the Queen's Law Journal, the Alberta Law Review, University of British Columbia Law Review, the University of Ottawa Law Review, the Saskatchewan Law Review, the University of Toronto Faculty of Law Review and the Windsor Review of Legal and Social Issues (WRLSI). The country also has several specialized publications run entirely by students.

=== Europe ===
Outside North America, student-run law reviews are the exception rather than the norm. In Continental Europe law reviews are almost uniformly edited by academics. However, a small number of student-edited law reviews have recently sprung into existence in Germany (Ad Legendum, Bucerius Law Journal, Freilaw Freiburg Law Students Journal, Goettingen Journal of International Law, Hanse Law Review, Heidelberg Law Review, Marburg Law Review), the Netherlands (Ars Aequi), Groningen Journal of International Law), Finland Helsinki Law Review and the Czech Republic (Common Law Review).

==== Belgium ====
In Belgium, the oldest and most prominent student-edited law review is Jura Falconis. It was founded by a group of students from the Law Faculty of the Katholieke Universiteit Leuven who, in 1964, conceived the idea of producing their own law journal grafted on the famous American law reviews. Since then, Jura Falconis has grown into a very solid and most unusual value in the Belgian legal literature.

==== France ====
The articles in the leading law reviews in France are written by academics and lawyers, the principal editors are Dalloz, LexisNexis, Lamy Liaisons (part of the international Wolters Kluwer group) and Francis Lefebvre.

==== Ireland ====
Irish Law Times is an example of a professionally edited law review in Ireland, while some leading student law reviews include the Trinity College Law Review and the UCD Law Review.

==== Italy ====
Bocconi Legal Papers is a student-edited law journal in Italy. It is a project sponsored by Bocconi School of Law and is published by a group of students belonging to the same institution, under the supervision of several faculty advisors. They adopted the format of a working paper series, as a way to complement – rather than compete with – peer-reviewed publications and offer scholars an additional round of feedback.

The University of Bologna Law Review is a student-run law journal published by the Department of Legal Studies of the University of Bologna, and officially sponsored by Cleary Gottlieb Steen & Hamilton LLP and the International Chamber of Commerce - Italy. Its editorial board is composed of more than 150 members, including students, scholars, and professionals from all over the world. It is a double-blind peer reviewed law journal, run by University of Bologna, School of Law students, which follows The Bluebook: A Uniform System of Citation.

The Trento Student Law Review is a student-run law review based in Trento, Italy. Established in 2017, it published its first issue, titled "Number Zero", in January 2018.

==== The Netherlands ====
In the Netherlands, Ars Aequi is one of the few general legal journals. It has been published since 1951. It is edited by students from all faculties of law of Dutch universities, who review and edit submitted articles (peer review is not common in Dutch law journals). The quality of its publications is considered top-ranked in the Dutch legal discipline. Ars Aequi publishes articles written by established scholars, researchers and students. The editorial board does however not set different quality standards for student articles.

Ars Aequi has published its Black Issue in 1970, criticizing legal aid. It resulted in reforms of accessible legal aid in the Netherlands.

==== Nordic countries ====
In Iceland, Úlfljótur Law Review, has been in publication since 1947. In 2007 it celebrated its 60th anniversary. Since its creation in 1947 it has been edited and run by students at the Department of Law, University of Iceland. Úlfljótur Law Review is the most senior of all academic journals still in publication at the university and held in great respect by Icelandic jurists and legal scholars.

In Finland, Helsinki Law Review, edited by students at the University of Helsinki, has been active since 2007. The Review is published twice a year. The Review is prepared to publish articles and other contributions in Finnish, Swedish, and English. Helsinki Law Review is supervised and counselled by an Academic Council that consists of a number of senior academic staff members in the University of Helsinki Faculty of Law. Each article is evaluated anonymously by two referees chosen among academic professionals.

Sweden's first law review is Juridisk Publikation. The first number of Juridisk Publikation was published in April 2009. It originated as a review by students from Stockholm University. It is now delivered to Swedish law students from all universities, as well as to most legal libraries in the country. Juridisk Publikation is edited by top students from the law schools in Lund, Stockholm Uppsala, Gothenborg and Umeå. The publication is anonymously peer reviewed by a board of leading Swedish legal practitioners and academics.

In Norway, the first student edited law review Jussens Venner was founded in 1952 by students Carsten Smith and Torkel Opsahl (both of whom later became distinguished academics). Occasionally it features peer-reviewed articles, but its editors are composed of one student from the Faculty of Law at the University of Oslo and one student from the Faculty of Law at the University of Bergen. Its articles are mainly related to the curriculum at these universities.

==== United Kingdom ====
Within the United Kingdom, as in much of the Commonwealth outside North America (a notable exception being Australia), all of the leading law reviews are edited and run by academics. The leading law reviews in the United Kingdom and the Commonwealth more generally are the Law Quarterly Review (first published 1885), Modern Law Review (first published 1937), Cambridge Law Journal (first published 1973), Oxford Journal of Legal Studies (first published 1981) and Legal Studies (first published 1981).

=== Africa ===
In Africa, the Journal of African Law has published articles focusing on "legal pluralism and customary law'" to "issues of international law in the African context," including "legal and institutional regional and sub-regional developments, post conflict resolution, constitutionalism, commercial law and environmental law".

=== Argentina ===
In spite of some few exceptions, in Argentina almost all law reviews are run by publishing houses or law professors. In both cases, the involvement of students in the day to day creation of these reviews is fully narrowed. Among these few exceptions, it should be mentioned the case of Revista Lecciones y Ensayos, a law review ran by students at the School of Law of the University of Buenos Aires.

=== Australia ===
In Australia, as of 2017, the leading student-edited peer-reviewed academic law reviews are the Melbourne University Law Review, Melbourne Journal of International Law, University of New South Wales Law Journal, and Monash University Law Review. The Melbourne University Law Review generally outperforms Sydney Law Review on reputation, impact, citation in journal and cases and combined rankings. These publications are among the most-cited law reviews by the High Court of Australia and among the most cited non-US reviews by US journals. The top international law journal in Australia is the Melbourne Journal of International Law, also a student-edited peer-reviewed academic law review.

=== Brazil ===
In Brazil, law reviews are usually run by academics as well, but there are efforts by students to change this; for example: University of Brasilia Law Students Review (re-established in 2007), the Review of the Academic Center Afonso Pena from the Federal University of Minas Gerais (published since 1996), and the Alethes Periodic from Federal University of Juiz de Fora. To pursue academic recognition by the Brazilian Ministry of Education, review bodies must include post-graduated and ranked academics, which prevents student law reviews to even be recognized or compared to other similar legal periodicals.

=== China ===
In China, there are law reviews run by academics, as well as law reviews run by students.

The China Law Journal is an attempt to create a legal publication, that is produced from all groups related to law, including lawyers, academics, students, members of the judiciary, procurators and anyone else in related fields with an interest in China.

=== India ===
Examples include the NALSAR Student Law Review and the National Law School of India Review.

=== Mexico ===
The Mexican Law Review, the law review of the National Autonomous University of Mexico, Mexico's preeminent university, is edited by professors and is therefore a closer cousin to peer-reviewed social science journals than to typical student-run law journals.

=== Ecuador ===
RUPTURA, is the law review of the Law School Association of the Pontifical Catholic University of Ecuador. This law review is edited by students who maintain an annual publication standard. RUPTURA is considered the oldest magazine in the region.

== Online legal research providers ==
Online legal research providers such as Westlaw and LexisNexis give users access to the complete text of most law reviews published beginning from the late 1980s. Another such service, Heinonline, provides actual scans of the pages of law reviews going back to the 1850s.

== Student activity ==
Membership on the law review staff is highly sought after by some law students, as it often has a significant impact on their subsequent careers as attorneys. Many U.S. federal judges and partners at the most prestigious law firms were members or editors of their school's law review. There are a number of reasons why journal membership is desired by some students:

- Some see the intense writing, research and editing experience as invaluable to the student's development as an attorney.
- Others see the selection process as helping differentiate the best and the brightest from an already strong group of law students.

At schools with more than one law review, membership on the main or flagship journal is normally considered more prestigious than membership on a specialty law journal. This is not the case at all schools, however. At many schools, the more prestigious journal is the specialty journal; a low-ranked general journal will rarely attract as much attention as a category-leading specialized journal. Often the best indicator is the age of the journal; a newer journal will rarely have the same clout with employers that the older journal has, even when the older journal is specialized. In any case, membership on any such journal is a valuable credential when searching out employment after law school.

The paths to membership vary from law school to law school, and also from journal to journal, but generally contain a few of the same basic elements. Most law reviews select members after their first year of studies either through a writing competition (often referred to as "writing on" to the law review), their first-year grades (referred to as "grading on" to the law review) or some combination thereof. Most Canadian law reviews, however, do not take grades into considerations and cannot be submitted with the application. A number of schools will also grant membership to students who independently submit a publishable article. The write-on competition usually requires applicants to compose a written analysis of a specific legal topic, often a recent Supreme Court decision. The written submissions are often of a set length, and applicants are sometimes provided with some or all of the background research. Submissions normally are graded blindly, with submissions identified only by a number which the graders will not be able to connect to a particular applicant. A student who has been selected for law review membership is said to have "made the law review".

Secondary journals vary widely in their membership process. For example, at Yale Law School, the only one of its nine journals that has a competitive membership process is the flagship Yale Law Journal – all others are open to any Yale Law student who wishes to join. By contrast, other secondary journals may have their own separate membership competition or may hold a joint competition with the main law review.

A law review's membership is normally divided into staff members and editors. On most law reviews, all 2Ls (second-year students) are staff members while some or all 3Ls (third-year students) serve as editors. 3Ls also typically fill the senior editorial staff positions, including senior articles editor, senior note & comment editor, senior managing editor, and the most prestigious of all, editor-in-chief of the law review. (Upon graduation, the editor-in-chief of the law review can often expect to be highly recruited by the most prestigious law firms.) As members, students are normally expected to edit and cite-check the articles that are being published by the law review, ensuring that references support what the author claims they support and that footnotes are in proper Bluebook format, depending on the publication's preference. On some law reviews, students may be expected to write a note or comment of publishable quality (although it need not actually be published), although other law reviews often pull from a broader pool for submissions.

The editorial staff is normally responsible for reviewing and selecting articles for publication, managing the editing process, and assisting members in writing their notes and comments. Depending on the law school, students may receive academic credit for their work on the law review, although some journals are entirely extracurricular.

== History of law reviews ==
=== United States ===
English and US law education in the early 19th century was dominated by the study of "discursive" treatises which examined older English case law. These treatises were written by eminent scholars of the era but had diminishing relevance to a newly founded nation. The treatise format was also unsuited to communicate the rapid decisions of a young court system to an expanding population of lawyers. By the 1850s a number of legal periodicals had arisen in the US which "typically highlighted recent court decisions, local news, and editorial comments". One of these periodicals, the American Law Register, was founded in 1852 and has been published continually since. Now known as the University of Pennsylvania Law Review, it is the oldest surviving law review in the US.

By the 1870s, these early commercial legal periodicals established the format for a more "modern style of legal writing" and led to today's student-edited law reviews. The first student-edited law periodical in the US was the Albany Law School Journal, founded in 1875. This journal, described as something like a "legal newspaper", folded after just one year. Its spiritual successor, the current Albany Law Review, was later published in 1936.

The Columbia Jurist was created by students in 1885 but ceased publication in 1887. Despite its short lifespan, the Jurist is credited with inspiring creation of the Harvard Law Review, first published in 1887. The current Columbia Law Review was founded in 1901.

The National Law Review also started during the 1880's, but was not student or academically produced, but published by Pennsylvania reporter and legal book publisher Kay & Brother and included editorially reviewed contributions by practicing attorneys focusing on the interpreting court decisions on a nationwide basis versus regionally and was not an academic law review. It continues today as on-line only daily legal news service with analysis contributed by lawyers and the publication's journalists.

The success of the Harvard Law Review provided a model that was followed by later journals: faculty-written articles solicited and published by student editors. Yale Law Journal, first published in 1891, used this format to great success. Other contemporary journals were launched by faculty with varying degrees of student input including Dickinson Law Review in 1897.

The West Virginia Bar, a publication by the state Bar Association started in 1894. In 1917, editorship was taken over by the West Virginia College of Law and became the West Virginia Law Review in 1949.

The first law review originating outside the Northeast was the Michigan Law Review, beginning in 1902. The Northwestern University Law Review—formerly the Illinois Law Review—followed shortly thereafter in 1906. Both Michigan and Northwestern were launched by faculty and only later turned over to student editors. Following these publications, there was a lull in new journals broken in 1908 by publication of the Maine Law Review which unfortunately ceased publication when the school closed in 1920.

The California Law Review, beginning in 1912, was the nation's first law review published west of Illinois. The Georgetown Law Journal was launched that same year.

Additional US law reviews

- Kentucky Law Journal - 1913
- Virginia Law Review - 1913
- Marquette Law Review - 1916
- Stanford Law Review - 1948

During the 1990s, the American Bar Association began coordinating its own practitioner journals with law schools, courting student editorial bodies for publications including Administrative Law Review, The International Lawyer, Public Contract Law Journal, and The Urban Lawyer.

Some law reviews also consider race, gender, and other demographic characteristics of all or a portion of prospective editors in order to increase the diversity of the journal’s membership. In 2018, a self-styled group of "faculty, alumni, and students opposed to racial preferences" sued New York University Law Review and Harvard Law Review over this practice. Both suits were dismissed in 2019 for lack of standing.

In 2019, the top 16 law schools in the United States all reported female editors-in-chief of their law reviews. For the first time in history, women led all of the law journals of the most prestigious U.S. law schools.

== See also ==
- Bar journal
