= Peter Whelan =

Peter Whelan may refer to:

- Peter Whelan (playwright) (1931–2014)
- Peter Whelan (priest) (1802–1871)
- Peter Whelan (lawyer)
