= UCD Law Review =

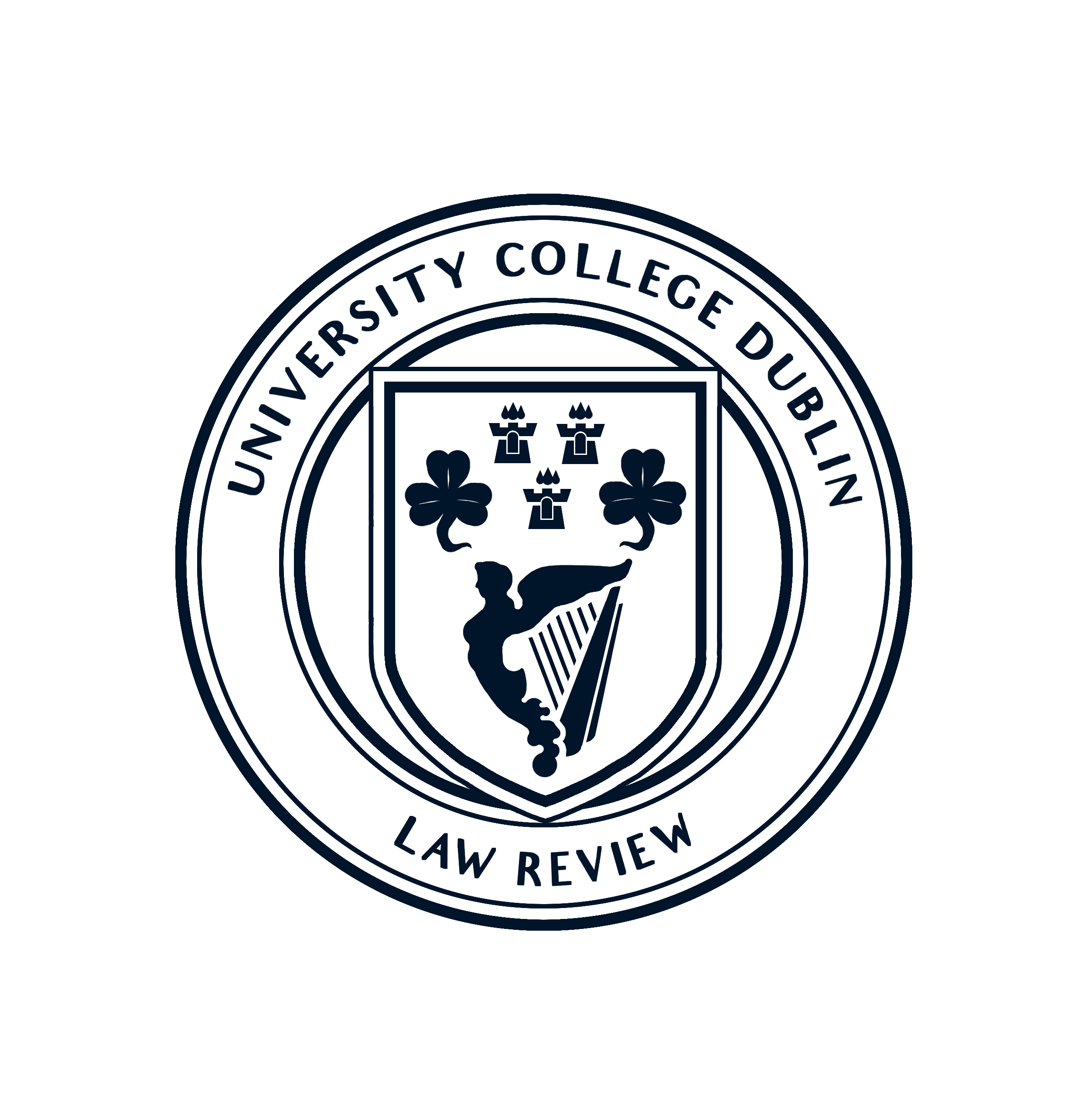
- Discipline: Law
- Language: English
- Edited by: Robin Jowett

Publication details
- History: 2001-present
- Publisher: University College Dublin (Ireland)
- Frequency: Yearly

Standard abbreviations
- ISO 4: UCD Law Rev.

Indexing
- ISSN: 1649-1327
- LCCN: 80644971
- OCLC no.: 226370397

Links
- Journal homepage

The University College Dublin Law Review is an annual, student-edited law journal published by the Sutherland School of Law at University College Dublin. Established in 2001, it publishes scholarly articles on Irish, European, and international law, as well as contemporary legal issues, and is edited each year by an independent editorial board of UCD law students. The journal has long-standing external support from the Irish law firm Arthur Cox. The journal is customarily launched in late autumn each year.

== History ==
The journal was founded in 2001 and has been published annually since. Launch events for new volumes have features members of the Irish judiciary and legal profession. Early activity centred on public launches on campus and the cultivation of links with the Irish bench and bar. The fourth volume was launched in 2004 at Roebuck Castle in UCD; attendees included the former Taoiseach Garret FitzGerald, the Supreme Court judge Adrian Hardiman, and High Court judge Michael Peart. The 2004 issue carried a foreword by the then-Supreme Court judge Susan Denham. Launch traditions continued in later years. Volume 16 (2016) was launched by the President of the High Court, Mr Justice Peter Kelly, with a foreword by Ms Justice Mary Finlay Geoghegan.

By the mid-2020s, the journal supplemented its annual print volume with an online companion for shorter, time-sensitive commentary entitled the Sutherland Symposium while maintaining the main volume's double-blind selection process.

Former members of the editorial board include Sally Hayden and Maeve O'Rourke.

== Scope and submissions ==
The journal invites submissions on a broad range of legal topics, particularly in Irish and European law, and also welcomes work on wider questions of international law. Calls for papers are periodically published in the Irish legal press. The journal is edited and produced by students drawn from across the School of Law's programmes.

=== Sutherland Symposium ===
The Sutherland Symposium is the journal's online companion, publishing shorter, timely pieces on a rolling basis. It operates separate submission guidelines and focuses on commentary on recent cases and topical legal issues.

== See also ==
- Trinity College Law Review
