= Peter Whelan (lawyer) =

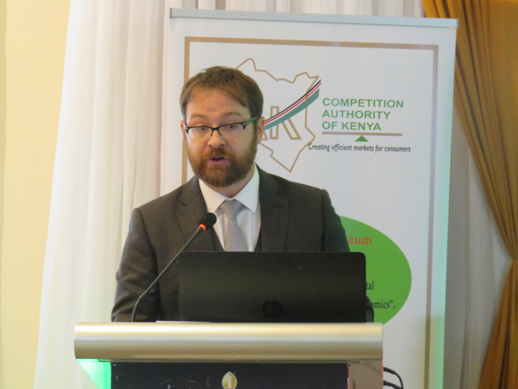
- Peter Whelan in Nairobi, Kenya, September 2017
- Education: Trinity College, Dublin and St John's College, Cambridge
- Notable work: Parental Liability in EU Competition Law (Oxford University Press); The Criminalisation of European Cartel Enforcement (Oxford University Press)
- Title: Professor of Law
- Website: https://essl.leeds.ac.uk/law/staff/242/professor-peter-whelan

Peter Whelan (born 1979) is a professor of law at the School of Law, University of Leeds. A qualified New York Attorney-at-Law, Whelan conducts research in competition (antitrust) law and criminal law. He published the first full-length monograph on the criminal enforcement of competition law with Oxford University Press.

== Education ==
Whelan studied at both Trinity College Dublin and St John's College, Cambridge. In 2001 he was awarded a degree in law and French from Trinity College Dublin. During this degree he participated in the Erasmus Programme and studied at the University of Poitiers in France. In 2003, following an academic year teaching English in Harbin, China, he completed a master's degree in law at Trinity College Dublin. He passed the New York Bar Exam in 2005 and then went on to complete a PhD in Law at St John's College, University of Cambridge. While at Cambridge he was the Managing Editor and then Consultant Editor of the Cambridge Law Review. In 2013 Whelan obtained a Certificate in Higher Education Practice from the University of East Anglia and subsequently became a Fellow of the Higher Education Academy.

== Academic career ==
From 2005 to 2010, Whelan was the Research Fellow in Competition Law at the British Institute of International and Comparative Law in London. In 2010, he took up a lectureship in law at the University of East Anglia. In 2013 he was promoted to senior lecturer in law. That same year he took up an associate professorship at the School of Law, University of Leeds. In 2017, he was promoted to a full professorship at the University of Leeds. From 2013-2019 he was the Deputy Director of the Centre for Criminal Justice Studies. In August 2020, Whelan became the Director of the Centre for Business Law and Practice.

In 2013 Whelan was tasked with writing a report for the Finnish Competition and Consumer Authority which analysed whether Finland should introduce criminal sanctions to enforce its competition law. The completed report was later presented to the Ministry of the Economy and Employment and the Ministry of Justice in Finland. In requesting the Finnish Ministry of Justice to consider the arguments presented in the report, Director General Pekka Timonen of the Ministry of Employment and the Economy Labour and Trade Department stated that the report provided 'the basis for the justification of criminalising cartels and the justified need to do so from the aspect of the judicial system in matters related to competition'.

In 2016 Whelan was appointed as a Non-Governmental Advisor to the International Competition Network. Since 2012 he has been a member of the Editorial Boards of the Journal of Antitrust Enforcement and World Competition. In 2014, he joined the Editorial Boards of the Romanian Competition Journal, the Journal of Financial Crime and the New Journal of European Criminal Law. Since 2011 he has been the Managing Editor of Oxford Competition Law, which is operated by Oxford University Press. He is a Member of the Council of the Society of Legal Scholars and is an elected member of the Senate of the University of Leeds. He acts as a Judge for the Undergraduate Awards and, since 2013, has been an Associate Member of the Centre for Competition Policy. He has been a visiting professor at the Institute of International Trade and Law in Moscow, Russia, where he taught a course on contract law. On two occasions he has delivered written and oral evidence on the enforcement of competition law to the New Zealand Parliament. He has trained members of the Romanian judiciary in EU competition law and has presented his research at the National Economic Prosecutor's Office of Chile and to judges at the Competition Tribunal of Chile. He was interviewed by the Verge on the implications of the European Commission's decision in its recent Google Search case and has been featured in the 'Academic Life' section of Jurista Vārds, Latvia's main legal periodical. In 2019, he gave oral evidence to the Competition Law Review Committee, a body created by the Government of India to review its competition regime. In 2021, he became a member of the United Nations Working Group on Cross-Border Cartels, which is operated by UNCTAD.

Whelan's work has been published in law journals such as Modern Law Review, Oxford Journal of Legal Studies, and Cambridge Law Journal. Whelan has presented his work in over thirty countries across six continents.

== Selected publications ==
=== Books ===
- Whelan, Debarment as an Enforcement Instrument in Antitrust Law (Oxford University Press: Oxford, forthcoming)
- Whelan, Parental Liability in EU Competition Law: A Legitimacy-Focused Approach (Oxford University Press: Oxford, 2023)
- Whelan, The Criminalisation of European Cartel Enforcement: Theoretical, Legal and Practical Challenges (Oxford University Press: Oxford, 2014)
- Rodger, Whelan and MacCulloch (eds), The UK Competition Regime: A Twenty-Year Retrospective (Oxford University Press: Oxford, 2021)
- Whelan (ed), Research Handbook on Cartels (Edward Elgar: Cheltenham, 2023)
- Almășan and Whelan (eds), The Consistent Application of EU Competition Law - Substantive and Procedural Challenges (Springer, 2017)
- Marsden, Hutchings and Whelan (eds), Current Competition Law V (London: BIICL, 2007)

== Reception of his work ==
Whelan's work has received positive reviews from professors at Loyola University Chicago, the University of East Anglia and Oxford.

Whelan has been shortlisted three times for an ‘Antitrust Writing Award’. For his work on Director Disqualification Order, Whelan has been shortlisted for a 2021 Antitrust Writing Award. For his publication ‘Competition Law and Criminal Justice’, Whelan was shortlisted for a 2019 ‘Antitrust Writing Award’. For his article ‘Cartel Criminalization and the Challenge of Moral Wrongfulness’, Whelan was shortlisted for a 2014 ‘Antitrust Writing Award'.

For his article ‘Morality and Its Restraining Influence on European Antitrust Criminalisation’, Whelan won the ‘Reddy Charlton McKnight Prize for Legal Scholarship', an annual prize that is administered by the Trinity College Law Review.

Whelan's research on cartel criminalisation was expressly endorsed in the New Zealand Parliament during the second reading of the Commerce (Criminalisation of Cartels) Amendment Bill.

Whelan's work has also been relied upon in case law in Europe, Africa and South America, in an antitrust decision adopted by the Swiss Competition Commission, in soft law (guidelines) created by the Competition Authority of Botswana, in two policy speeches of the then Chairman of the UK Competition Commission, in a report prepared by the Australian Senate, in a submission to Parliament written by the Australian Competition & Consumer Commission, in a report prepared by the European Commission, in a report prepared by the Research Office of the Danish Ministry of Justice, in a report written by the Business and Industry Advisory Committee for the Competition Committee of the OECD, in a report commissioned by DG Trade (European Commission), in a submission to the Transport and Infrastructure Committee of the New Zealand Parliament, in a report prepared for the Competition Commission of India, in a report for the Cabinet Office, in a report for the Korean Consumer Agency, in an official report of the Competition Authority of El Salvador, in a submission (by the Western Australian Independent Grocers Association) to the Competition Policy Review Panel set up by the Australian Government, in a report of the Ministry of Business, Innovation and Employment in New Zealand, in a report prepared for the National Economic Prosecutor's Office of Chile, in a Background Note prepared by the OECD, in a report prepared by the Chairman of the New Zealand Commerce Commission, in an UNCTAD report, and in a submission to the European Commission by the Federation of German Consumer Organisations. Whelan's work has been cited in more than 400 academic pieces.
