= Mary Beloff =

Argentine jurist

- Coat of arms of Argentina

Head of the General Prosecutor's Office for Criminal Policy, Human Rights and Community Services Currently in office
- Incumbent
- Assumed office November 30, 2007

Personal details
- Born: Buenos Aires, Argentina
- Education: Education: Doctorate in Criminal Law from the University of Buenos Aires Educated at: University of Buenos Aires Postgraduate: Harvard University
- Known for: Expertise in Criminal Law, Criminal Procedure Law, and Children's Rights Professor of Criminal Law and Criminal Procedure Law at the University of Buenos Aires Prosecutor General for Criminal Policy, Human Rights, and Community Services of the Argentine Republic Member of the UN Committee on the Rights of the Child (2023-2027) Influence on Latin American legal reforms and human rights, especially in juvenile justice and children's protection

Mary Beloff is an Argentine jurist with expertise in Criminal Law, Criminal Procedure, and Children's Rights. She holds the position of Professor of Criminal Law and Criminal Procedure (Chair) at the University of Buenos Aires and, since November 30, 2007, has served as Prosecutor General for Criminal Policy, Human Rights, and Community Services within the National Public Prosecutor's Office of the Argentine Republic. She is currently a member of the United Nations Committee on the Rights of the Child (2023-2027).

== Biography and academic career ==
Mary Beloff completed her secondary education at the Colegio Nacional de Buenos Aires and graduated with an Honors Diploma in Law from the University of Buenos Aires (UBA). Her extensive academic background includes a Master of Laws (LL.M.) from Harvard University and a Doctorate in Criminal Law from the University of Buenos Aires, for which she received the highest distinction of summa cum laude and the Faculty Award.

As part of the first generation to study under the UBA Faculty of Law's revised curriculum, she now serves as a Full Professor of Criminal Law and Criminal Procedure at the University of Buenos Aires's Faculty of Law. She is also a tenured member of the Faculty Council and heads the Department of Criminal Law and Criminology. Additionally, she holds a Full Professorship at the University of Palermo, where she directs the "Criminal Law II" program.

During her university studies, she contributed to Revista Lecciones y Ensayos and founded Revista de crítica jurídica No hay Derecho, both student-edited journals for distinguished UBA students. In 2003, she co-founded and continues to co-direct Revista Academia, a legal journal that debuted that same year. It stands as the first journal published in both Spanish and Portuguese dedicated exclusively to legal education topics.

== Legal career and public service ==
Following an extensive judicial trajectory across the federal and national courts, as well as the Superior Court of Justice of the Autonomous City of Buenos Aires, Mary Beloff assumed the position of Prosecutor General for Criminal Policy, Human Rights, and Community Services within the National Public Prosecutor’s Office. Her appointment, conducted through a public competitive procedure and subsequently approved by the Honorable Senate of the Nation, entered into force on November 30, 2007.

== Influence on Latin American Law and International Organizations ==
Mary Beloff has been an active participant in numerous legal and institutional reform processes focused on criminal justice and human rights across Latin America. Furthermore, she has advised various Latin American countries and international organizations (UNICEF, IDB, UNOPS, ILANUD, OAS, UNDP) on implementing international human rights law domestically throughout the region. This includes work on Criminal Procedure Codes, juvenile justice laws, and child rights protection legislation. As a recognized academic in these fields, she has also been responsible for the ongoing training of judges, prosecutors, public defenders, and NGO members on human rights standards implementation in Latin America and the Caribbean.

She developed and taught the first course on Juvenile Justice and Children's Rights at the University of Buenos Aires, where she became the first woman to win a competitive examination for a Full Professorship in Criminal Law and Criminal Procedure. As a jurist, her contributions to national and regional jurisprudence have been significant, particularly regarding the direct application of the Convention on the Rights of the Child and other international instruments in domestic law.

Her notable international engagements include:

- Member of the United Nations Committee on the Rights of the Child (2023-2027).
- Member of the Expert Advisory Council for the United Nations Study on Children Deprived of Liberty, 2018/2019.
- Member of the Expert Advisory Council for the United Nations Study on Violence Against Children, 2004/2006.
- Principal Advisor to the Rapporteurship on the Rights of the Child of the Inter-American Commission on Human Rights, 2002.

== Publications ==
Mary Beloff has authored a wide array of academic publications, including books, articles in specialized journals, and chapters in edited collections. Her work explores topics such as juvenile criminal law, children's rights, transitional justice, the adversarial system, and human rights. She has also developed original conceptual frameworks for the study of women's rights and children's rights.

=== Published books ===
- Beloff, Mary, Derechos del Niño. Su protección especial en el sistema interamericano. Análisis sistemático de fallos fundamentales. Buenos Aires: Editorial Hammurabi, 1° edición, 2018. ISBN 978-950-741-902-7 2° edición, 2019. ISBN 978-950-741-104-5
- Beloff, Mary (Directora). Nuevos problemas de la justicia juvenil. Buenos Aires: Editorial Ad Hoc, 2017. ISBN 978-987-745-077-4
- Beloff, Mary. ¿Qué hacer con la justicia juvenil? Buenos Aires: Editorial Ad Hoc, 2016. ISBN 978-987-745-054-5
- Beloff, Mary. Protección a la niñez en América Latina. Fortalezas y debilidades. Monterrey: Coordinación Editorial del Poder Judicial de Nuevo León, 2014
