= Federal Circuit Bar Journal =

The Federal Circuit Bar Journal is the official journal of the Federal Circuit Bar Association and the Federal Circuit Court of Appeals. The journal embraces the entire scope of subject matter within the jurisdiction of the Federal Circuit Court of Appeals including appeals involving patents, government contracts, vaccine injury claims, international trade, and certain money claims among others. The journal is circulated to the members of the Federal Circuit Bar Association, approximately 3,000 individuals including distinguished lawyers, district judges, and appellate judges. In addition, it is also distributed to over 100 law schools across the United States.

The journal is currently housed at the George Washington University Law School after previously being housed at George Mason University School of Law. The journal is run by a student editorial board with the support, guidance, and assistance of the George Washington University Law School faculty, as well as practitioner members of the Federal Circuit Bar Association. The journal, which typically goes by the acronym "FCBJ," accepts submissions from authors seeking publication throughout the year through the journal's website.
