= George Washington University Law School =

Law school in Washington, D.C., US

Coordinates: 38.8988°N 77.045°W

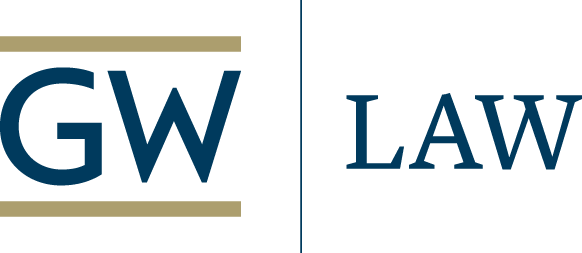
- Parent school: George Washington University
- Established: 1865
- School type: Private law school
- Parent endowment: $2.8 billion
- Dean: Dayna Bowen Matthew
- Location: Washington, D.C., U.S.
- Enrollment: 1,728 (2025)
- Faculty: 402 (2024-25)
- USNWR ranking: 26th (tie) (2026)
- Bar pass rate: 90.22%
- Website: law.gwu.edu
- ABA profile: Standard 509 Report

The George Washington University Law School (GW Law) is the law school of George Washington University, a private research university in Washington, D.C. Established in 1865, GW Law is the oldest law school in Washington, D.C.

GW Law has an alumni network that includes notable people within the fields of law and government, including former U.S. attorney general William P. Barr, former U.S. secretary of the interior David Bernhardt, foreign heads of state, judges of the International Court of Justice, ministers of foreign affairs, former director-general of the World Intellectual Property Organization Árpád Bogsch, former director of the CIA Allen Dulles, members of U.S. Congress, U.S. state governors, four directors of the FBI, and numerous federal judges.

== History ==
=== 19th century ===
The George Washington University Law School was founded in the 1820s but closed in 1826 due to low enrollment. The first two professors were William Cranch, chief justice of the Circuit Court for the District of Columbia and William Thomas Carroll, a descendant of Charles Carroll the Settler and clerk of the U.S. Supreme Court from 1827 until his death in 1863. The law school was reestablished in 1865 and was the first law school in the District of Columbia.

Law classes resumed in 1865 in the Old Trinity Episcopal Church, and the school graduated its first class of 60 students in 1867. The Master of Laws degree program began in 1897.

=== 20th century ===
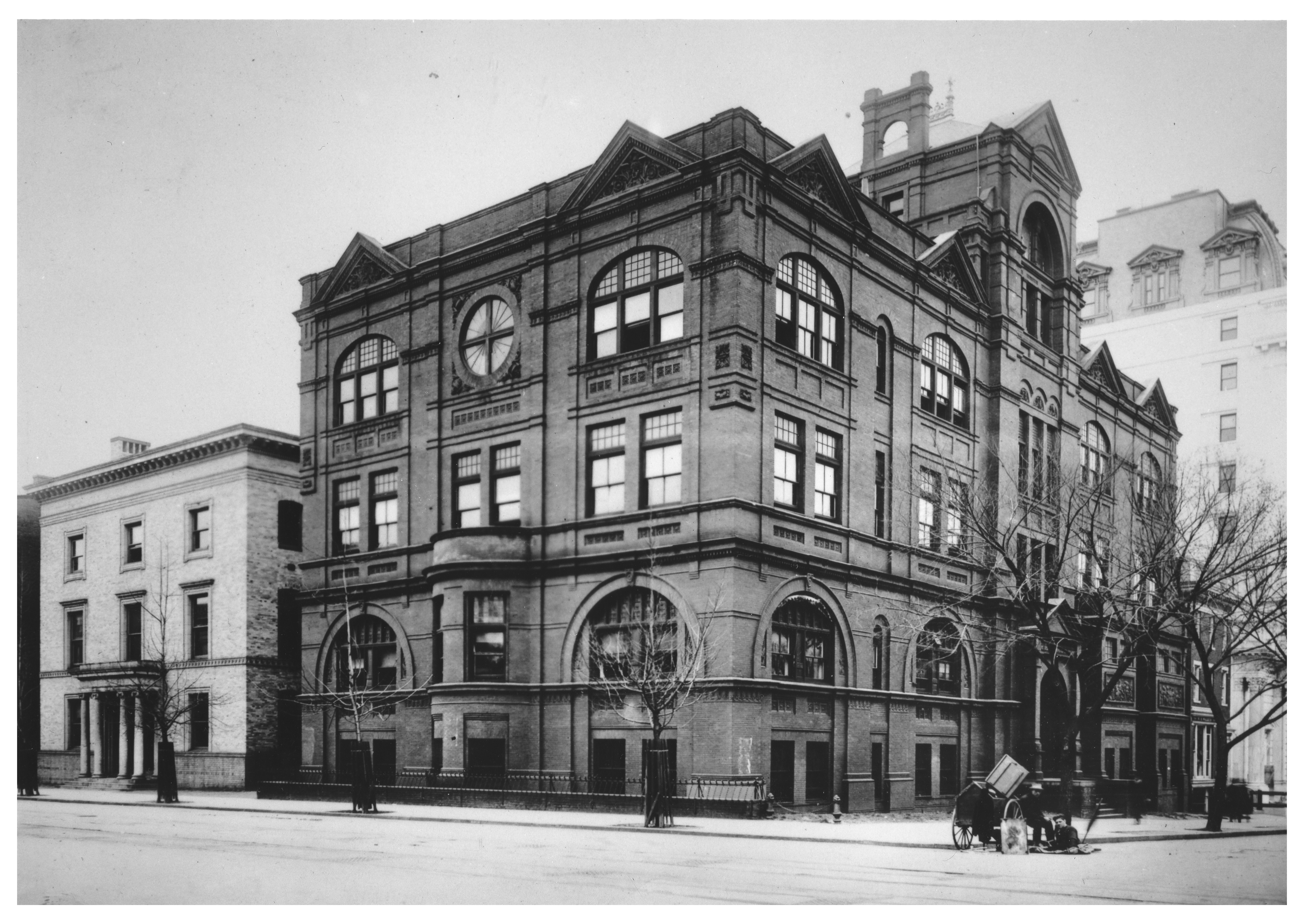
The original law building, c. 1920

In 1900, the school was one of the founding members of the Association of American Law Schools.

GW Law has one of the oldest intellectual property programs in the US. Its alumni have contributed to various technological advancements, including involvement in the patent for the Wright brothers' flying machine, granted on May 22, 1906.

The school was accredited by the American Bar Association in 1923.

In 1954, it merged with National University School of Law. The law school operated under the name National Law Center for the 37 years from 1959 to 1996, when it was renamed George Washington University Law School.

== Academics ==
=== Admissions ===
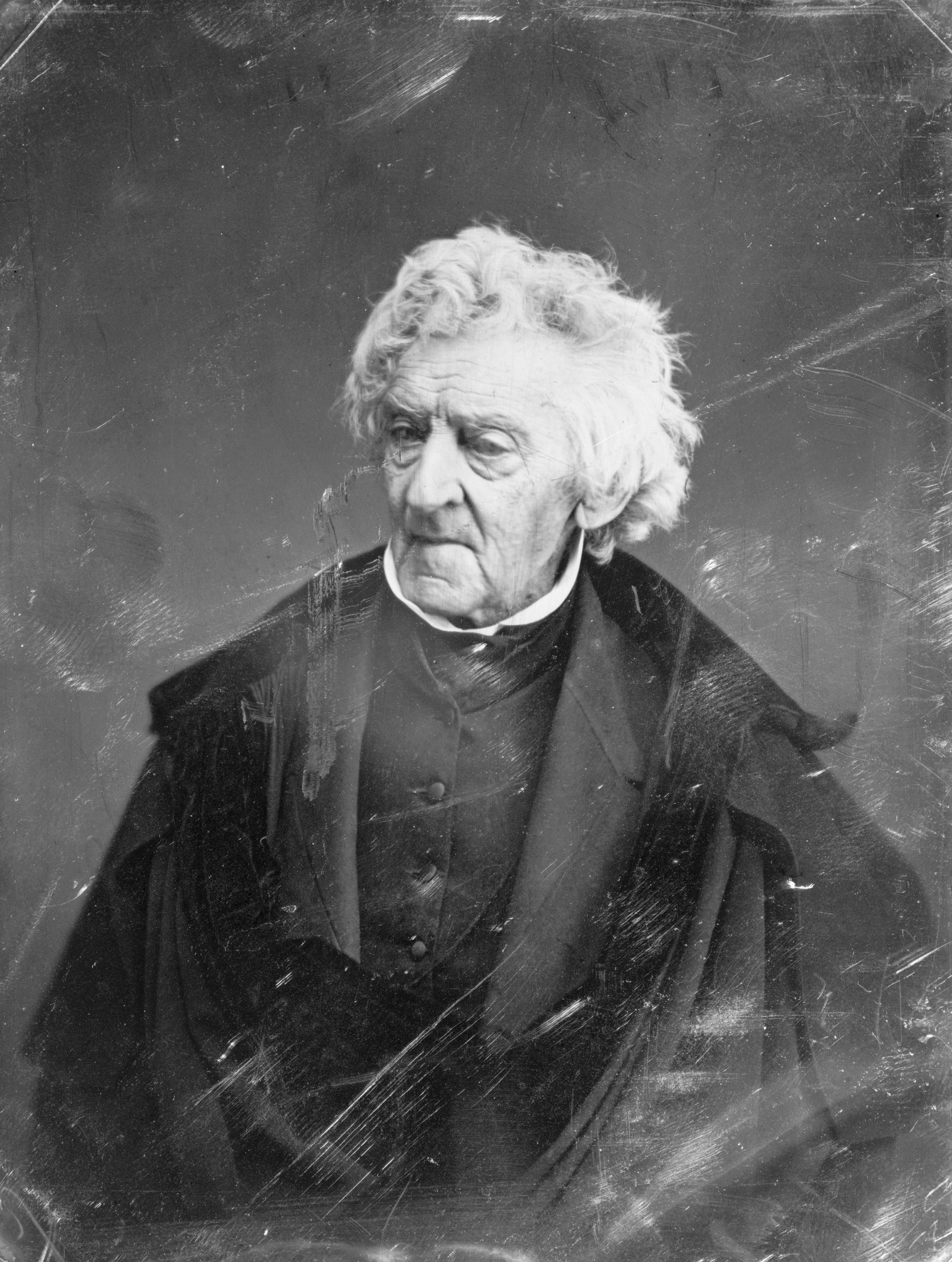
William Cranch, the first professor of the Law School and chief justice of the Circuit Court for the District of Columbia.

For the class entering in the fall of 2025, 2,644 out of 9,718 J.D. applicants (27%) were offered admission, with 595 matriculating. The 25th and 75th LSAT percentiles for the 2024 full-time entering class were 162 and 170, respectively, with a median of 168. The 25th and 75th undergraduate GPA percentiles were 3.55 and 3.93, respectively, with a median of 3.86.

=== Rankings and reputation ===
In 2026, U.S. News & World Report ranks GW Law as tied for the 26th top law school out of 195 in the United States.

=== Curriculum ===
GW Law offers numerous summer programs, including a joint program with the University of Oxford for the study of international human rights law at New College, Oxford each July.

=== Student recognition ===
Instead of supplying students with individual class rankings, the top 1–15% of the class are designated as George Washington Scholars, while the top 16–35% of the class are designated as Thurgood Marshall Scholars.

== Publications ==
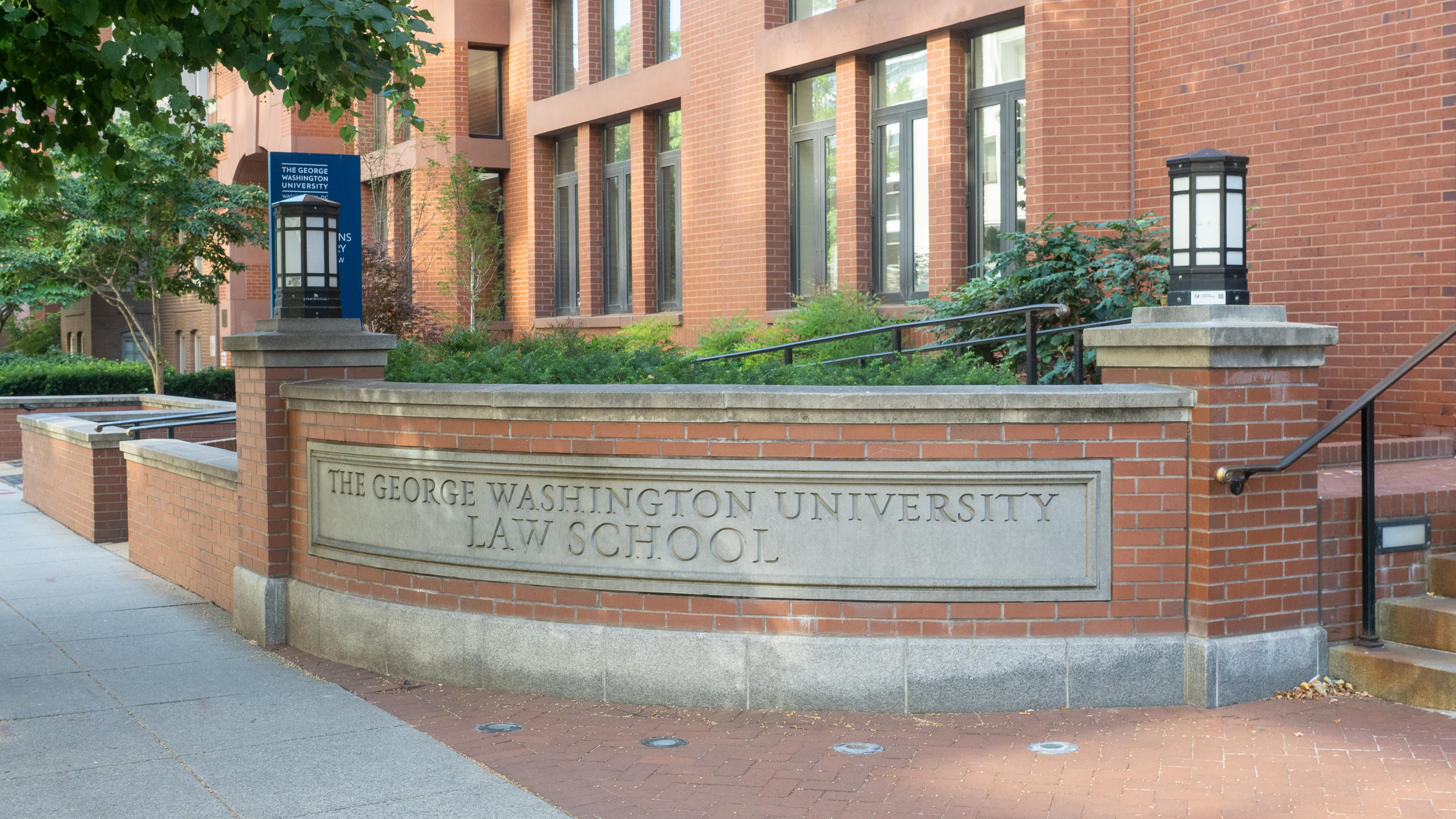
The Jacob Burns Law Library.

GW Law publishes ten journals:

- The George Washington Law Review
- The George Washington International Law Review
- The George Washington Business & Finance Law Review
- The Federal Circuit Bar Journal
- The American Intellectual Property Law Association Quarterly Journal
- The Public Contract Law Journal
- The Federal Communications Law Journal
- George Washington Journal of Law & Technology
- The Journal of Energy and Environmental Law
- International Law in Domestic Courts Journal

== Student life ==
In the 2018–19 academic year, GW Law had 1,525 J.D. students, of which 25% were minorities and 51% were female.

Students enrolled in the J.D. program come from 206 colleges and 11 countries. The law school also enrolls students from approximately 45 countries each year in its Master of Laws and Doctor of Juridical Science degree programs.

== Campus ==
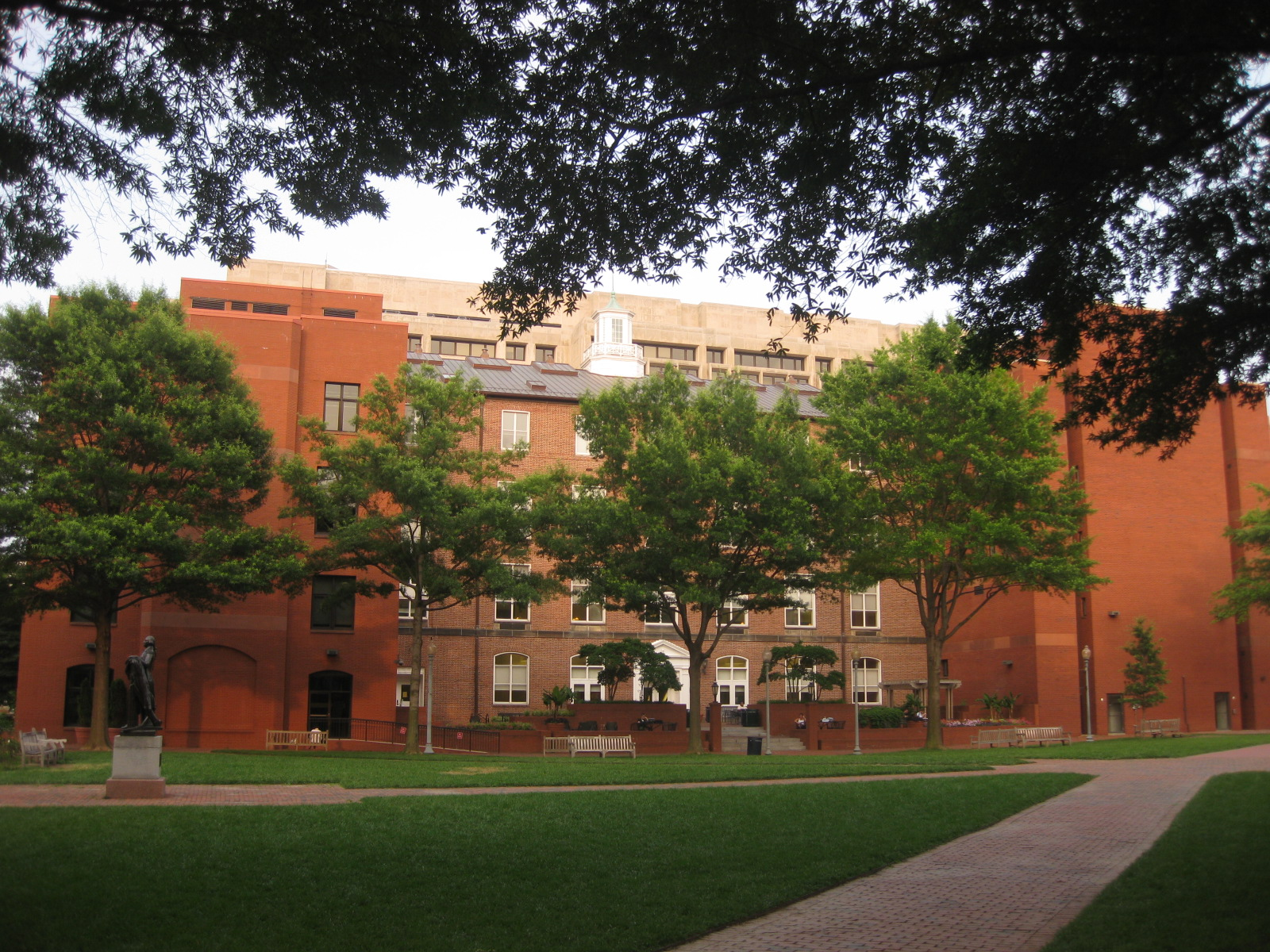
Lerner Hall, Stockton Hall, and the Burns Law Library, with the International Monetary Fund visible in the background

GW Law is located in Washington's Foggy Bottom neighborhood.

The Jacob Burns Law Library holds a collection of more than 700,000 volumes.

The law school currently occupies nine buildings on the main campus of The George Washington University. The law school's main complex comprises five buildings anchored by Stockton Hall (1924) located on the University Yard, the central open space of GW's urban campus. Renovated extensively between 2001 and 2003, these buildings adjoin one another, have internal passageways, and function as one consolidated complex. Three townhouses directly across from the main complex house the Community Legal Clinics, Student Bar Association, and student journal offices.

== Post-graduation employment ==
According to GW Law's official 2023 ABA-required disclosures, 90.0% of the Class of 2023 obtained full-time, long-term, bar passage-required, non-school funded employment ten months after graduation.

ABA Employment Summary for 2023 Graduates
Employment Status	Percentage
Employed – Bar Passage Required (Full-Time, Long-Term)	90%
Employed – Bar Passage Required (Part-Time and/or Short-Term)	0.80%
Employed – J.D. Advantage	4%
Employed – Professional Position	1.19%
Employed – Non-Professional Position	0.19%
Employed – Law School/University Funded	0.29%
Employed – Undeterminable	0.0%
Pursuing Graduate Degree Full Time	3.12%
Unemployed – Start Date Deferred	0.99%
Unemployed – Not Seeking	0.99%
Unemployed – Seeking	6.78%
Employment Status Unknown	0.39%
Total of 550 Graduates

== Costs ==
The total cost of full-time attendance (indicating the cost of tuition, fees, and living expenses) at GW Law for the 2024-2025 academic year was $106,471. GW Law's tuition and fees on average increased by 4.1% annually over the past five years.

The Law School Transparency estimated debt-financed cost of attendance for three years is $328,263. The average indebtedness of the 76% of 2013 GW Law graduates who took out loans was $123,693.

== Notable people ==
=== Faculty ===
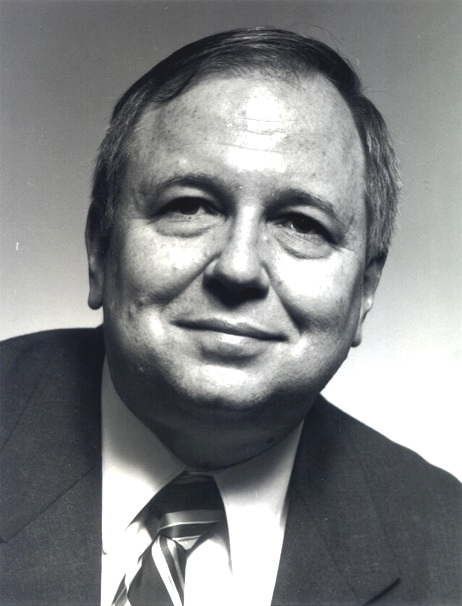
John F. Banzhaf III, legal activist who devised the Banzhaf power index

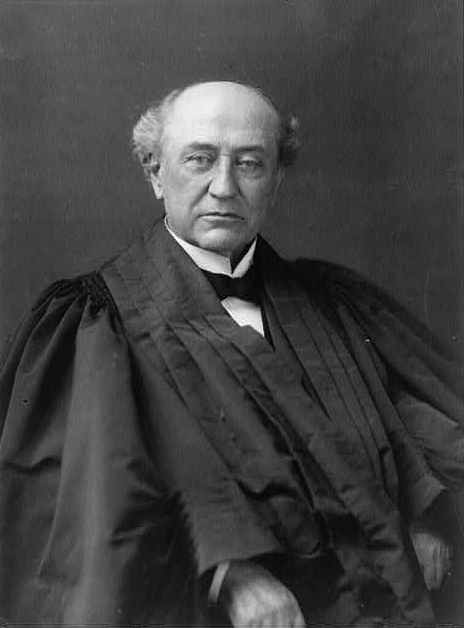
David J. Brewer (deceased), former U.S. Supreme Court associate justice

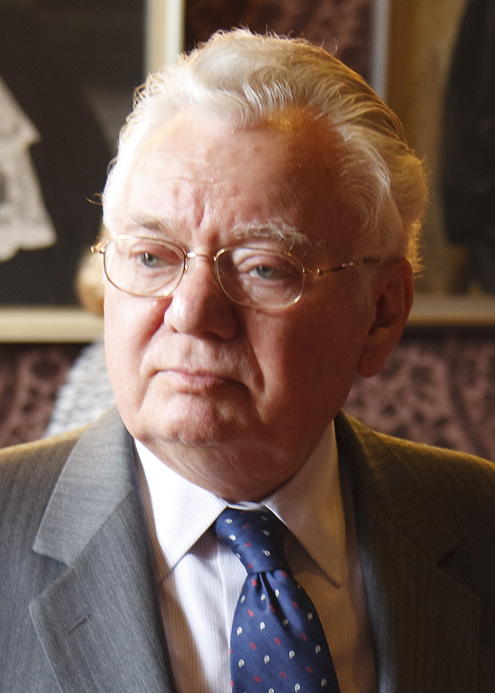
Thomas Buergenthal (deceased), former International Court of Justice judge

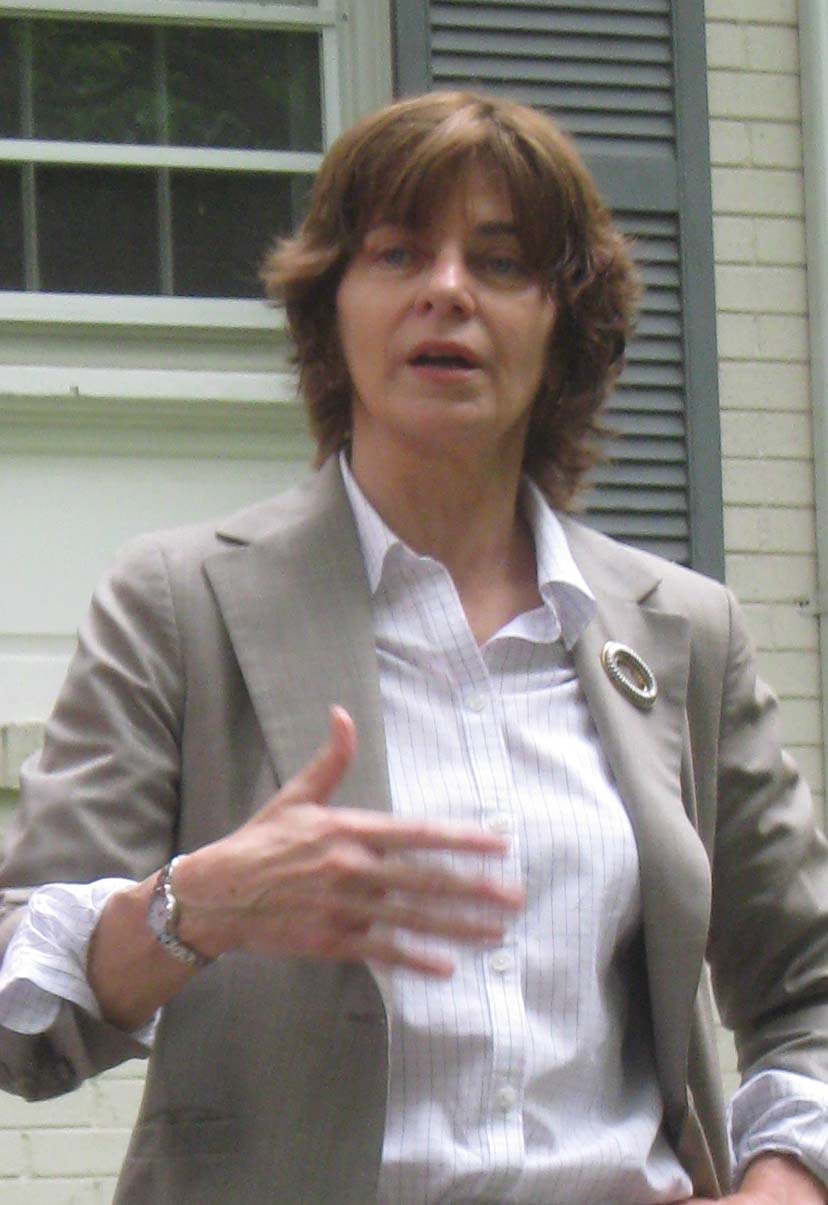
Mary Cheh, Washington, D.C. councilwoman

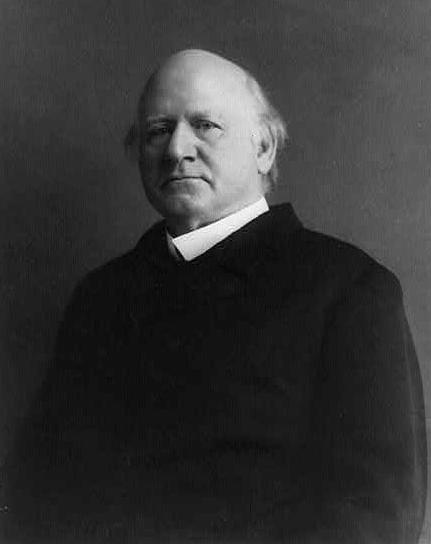
John Marshall Harlan (deceased, taught at Columbian Law School), former U.S. Supreme Court associate justice

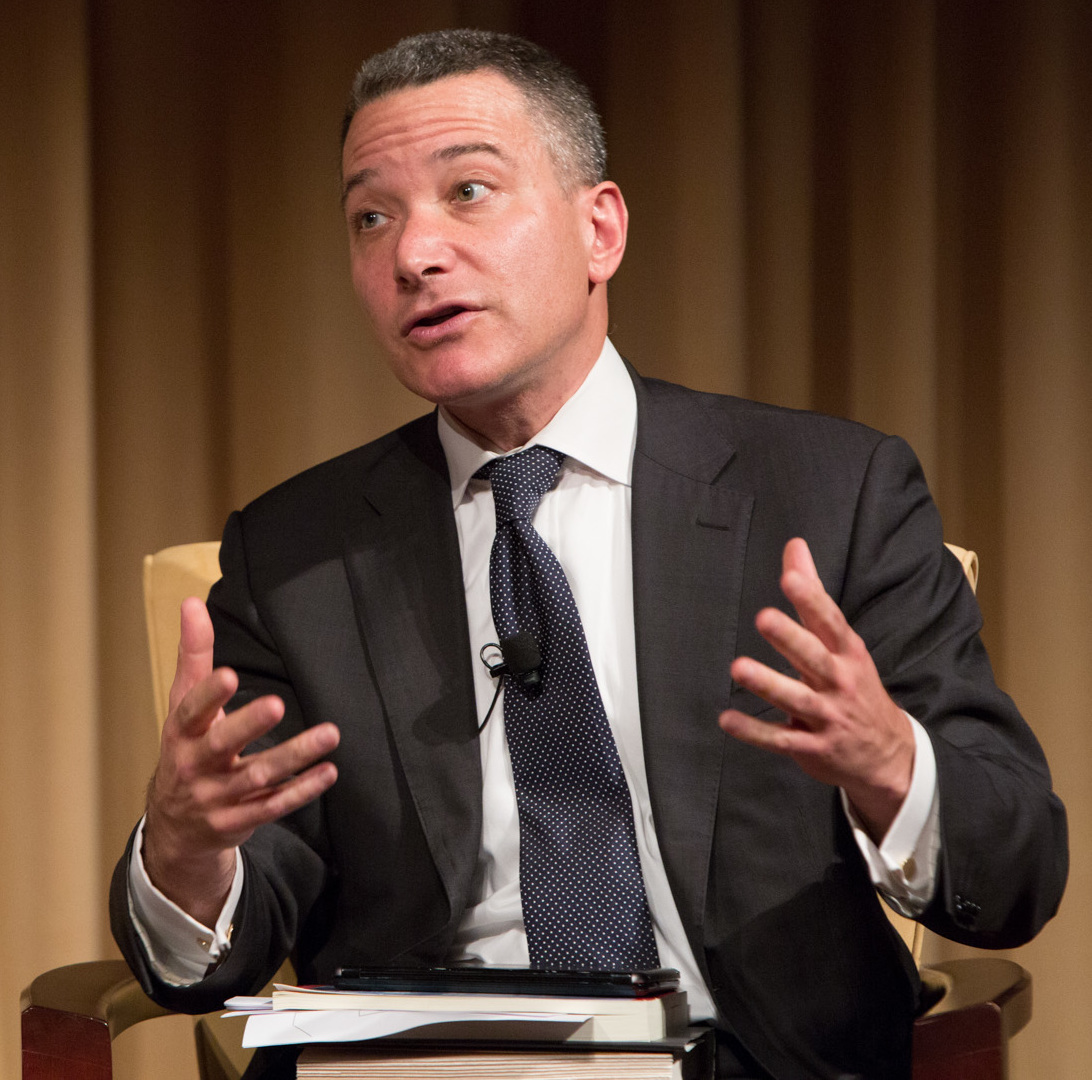
Jeffrey Rosen, National Constitution Center chairman and CEO, constitutional law journalist, and commentator

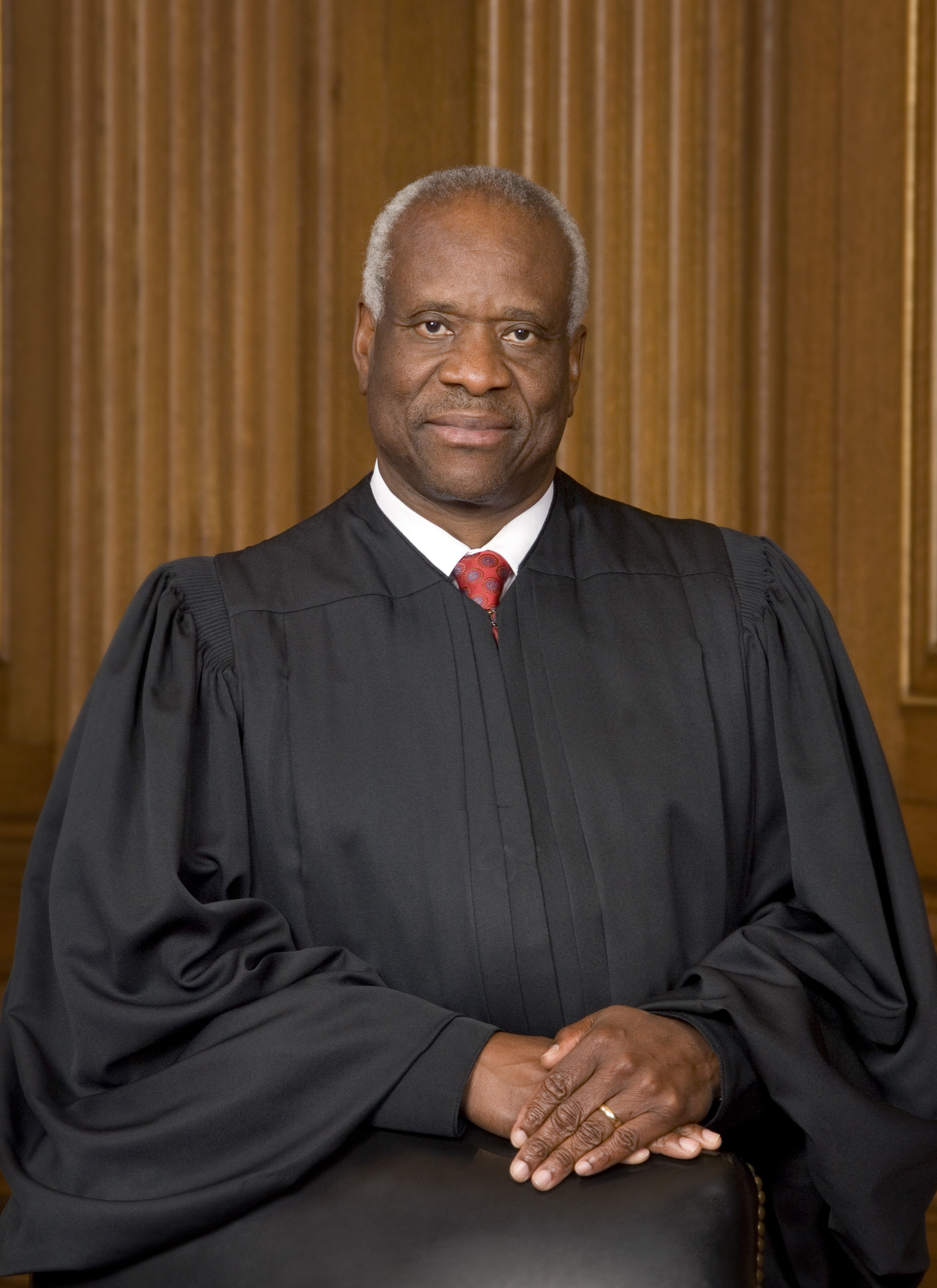
Clarence Thomas (former faculty), U.S. Supreme Court associate justice

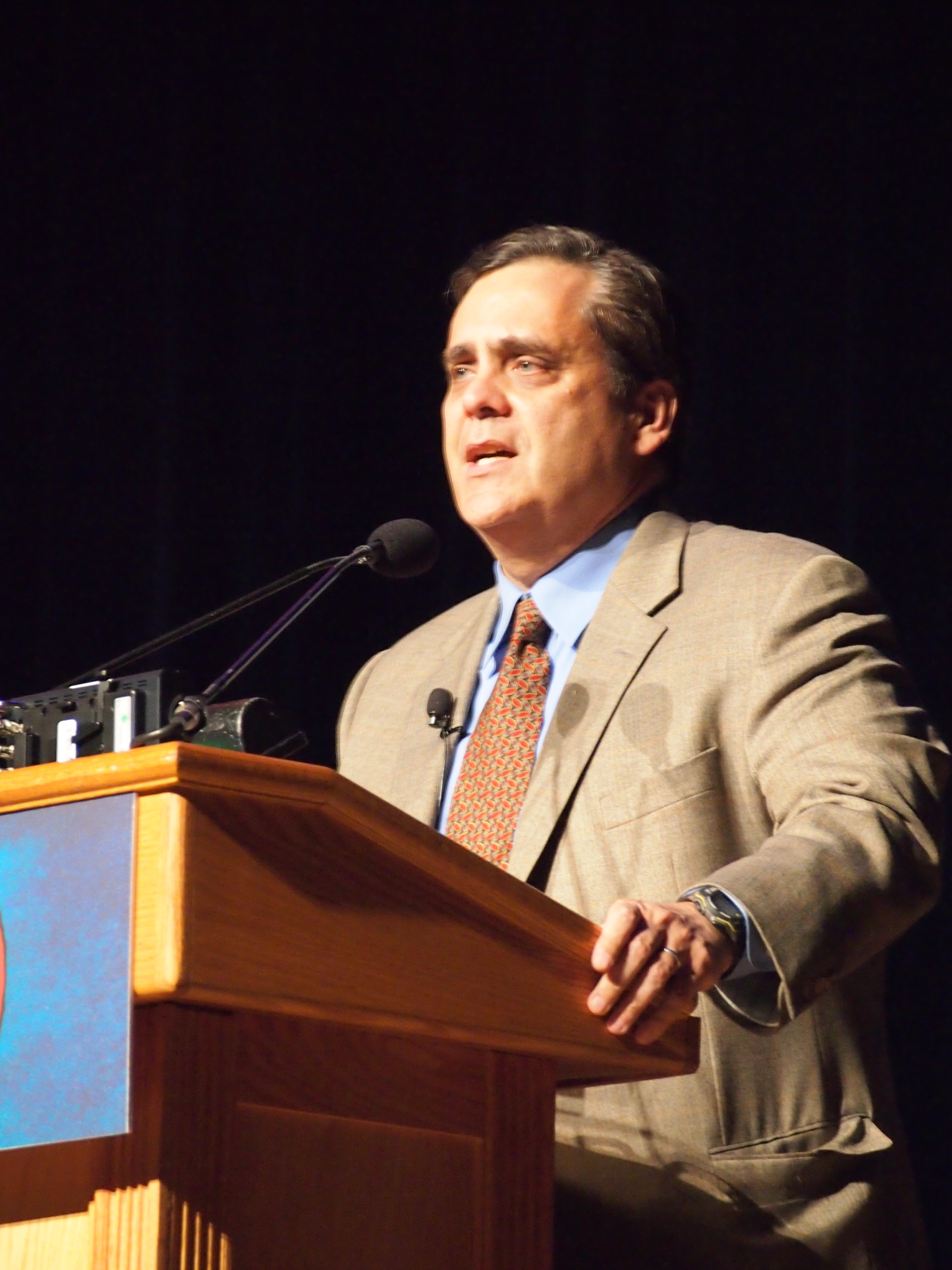
Jonathan Turley, legal commentator

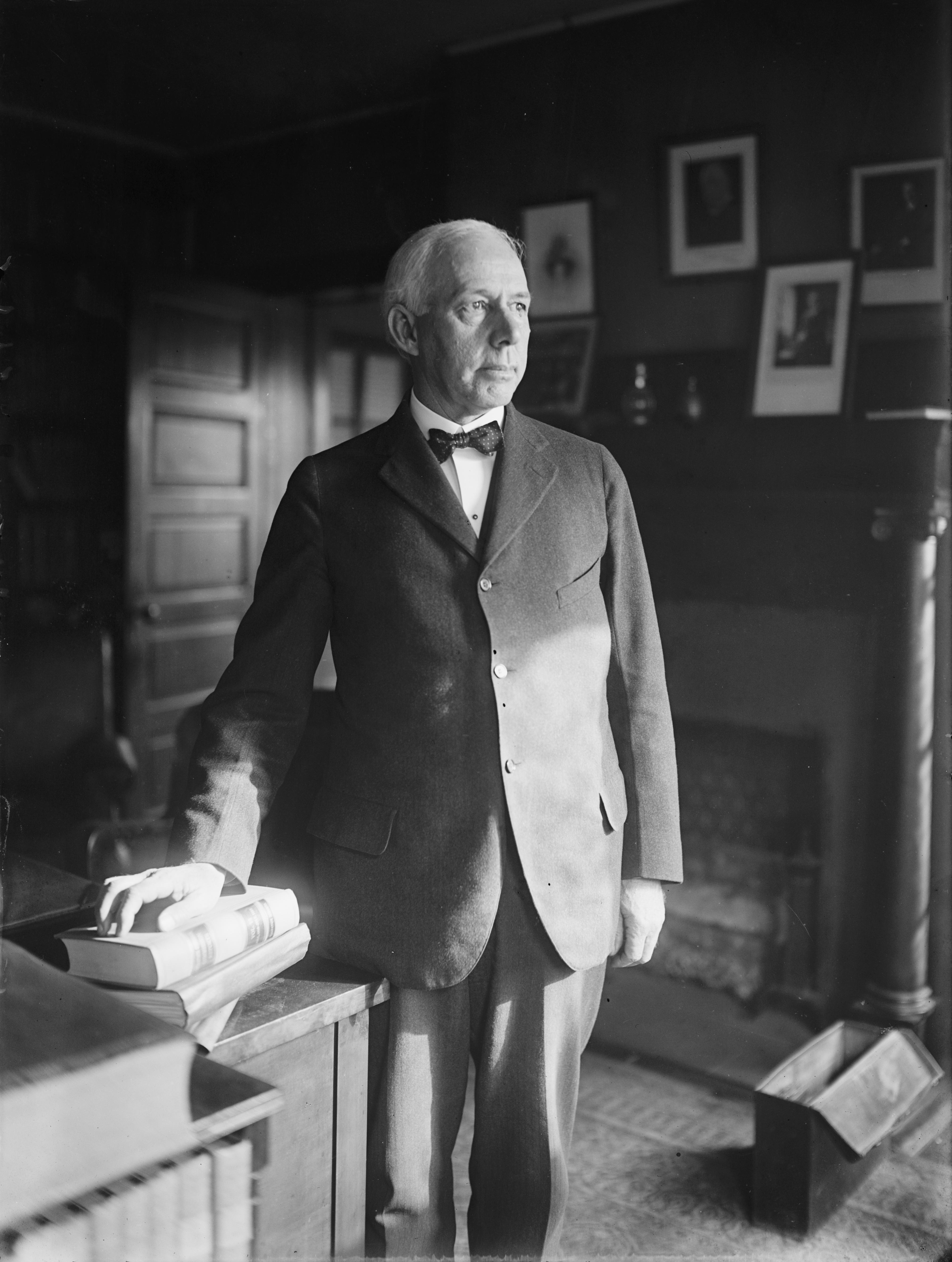
Willis Van Devanter (deceased, faculty 1897 to 1903), former U.S. Supreme Court associate justice

=== Alumni ===
Notable Alumni of the GW Law School

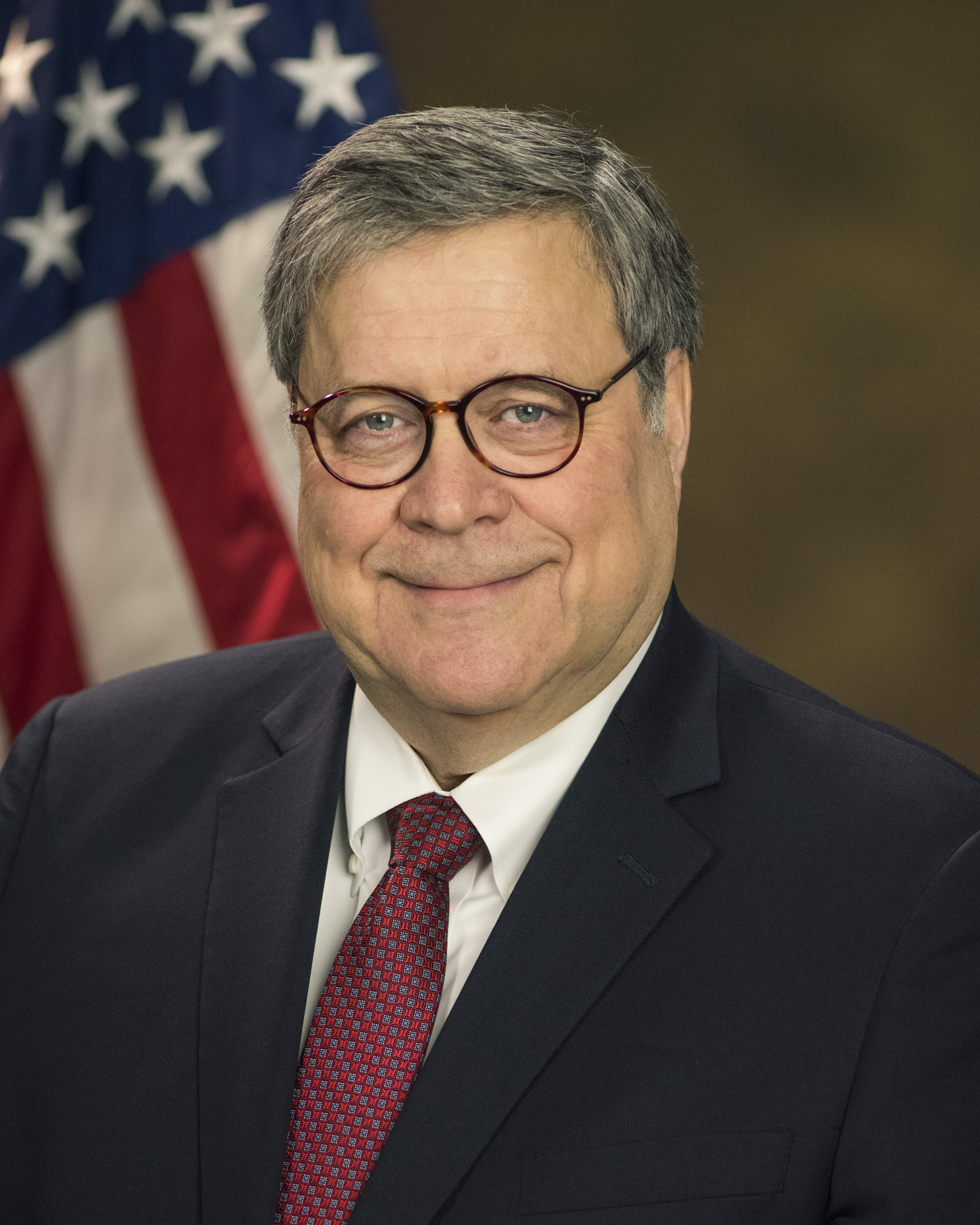
William Barr, former U.S. Attorney General

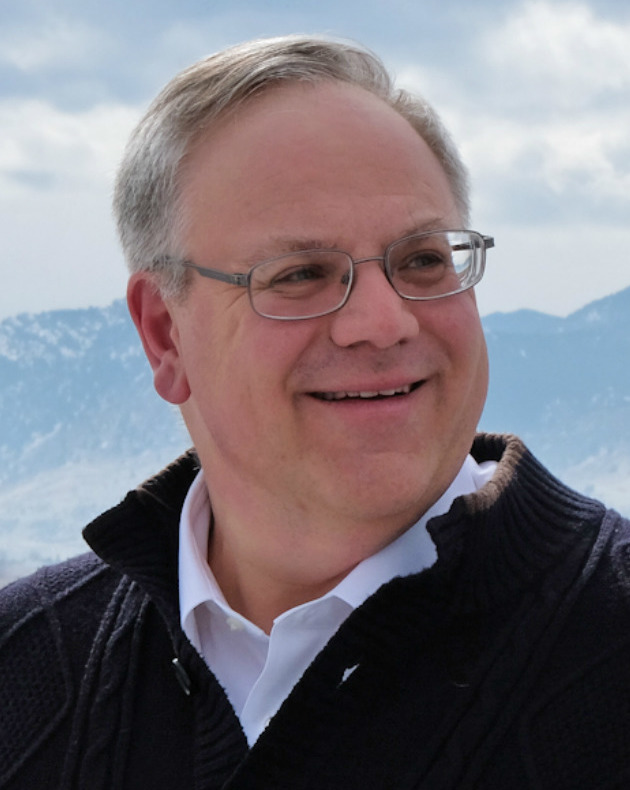
David Bernhardt, former U.S. Secretary of Interior

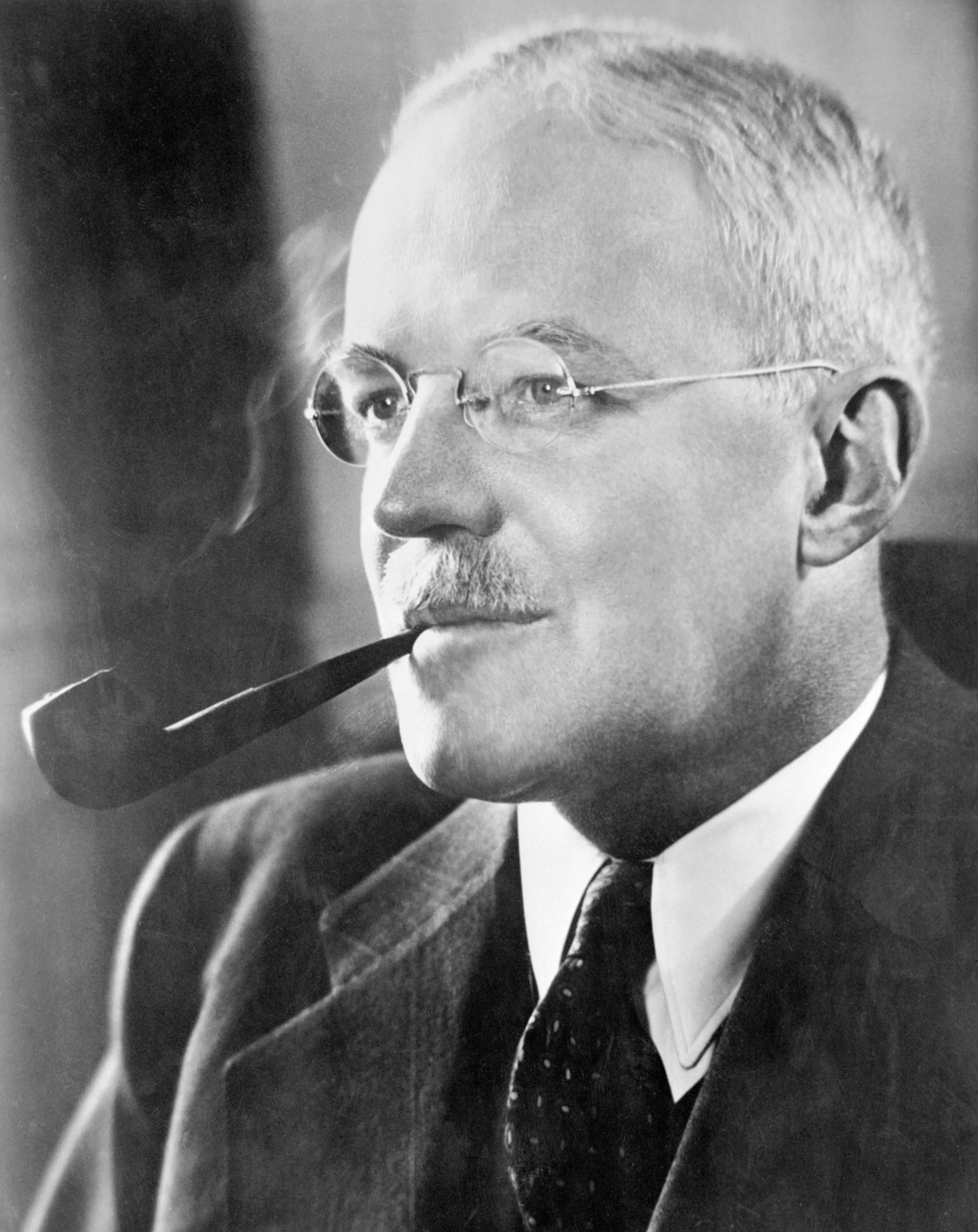
Allen Dulles, longest-serving CIA director

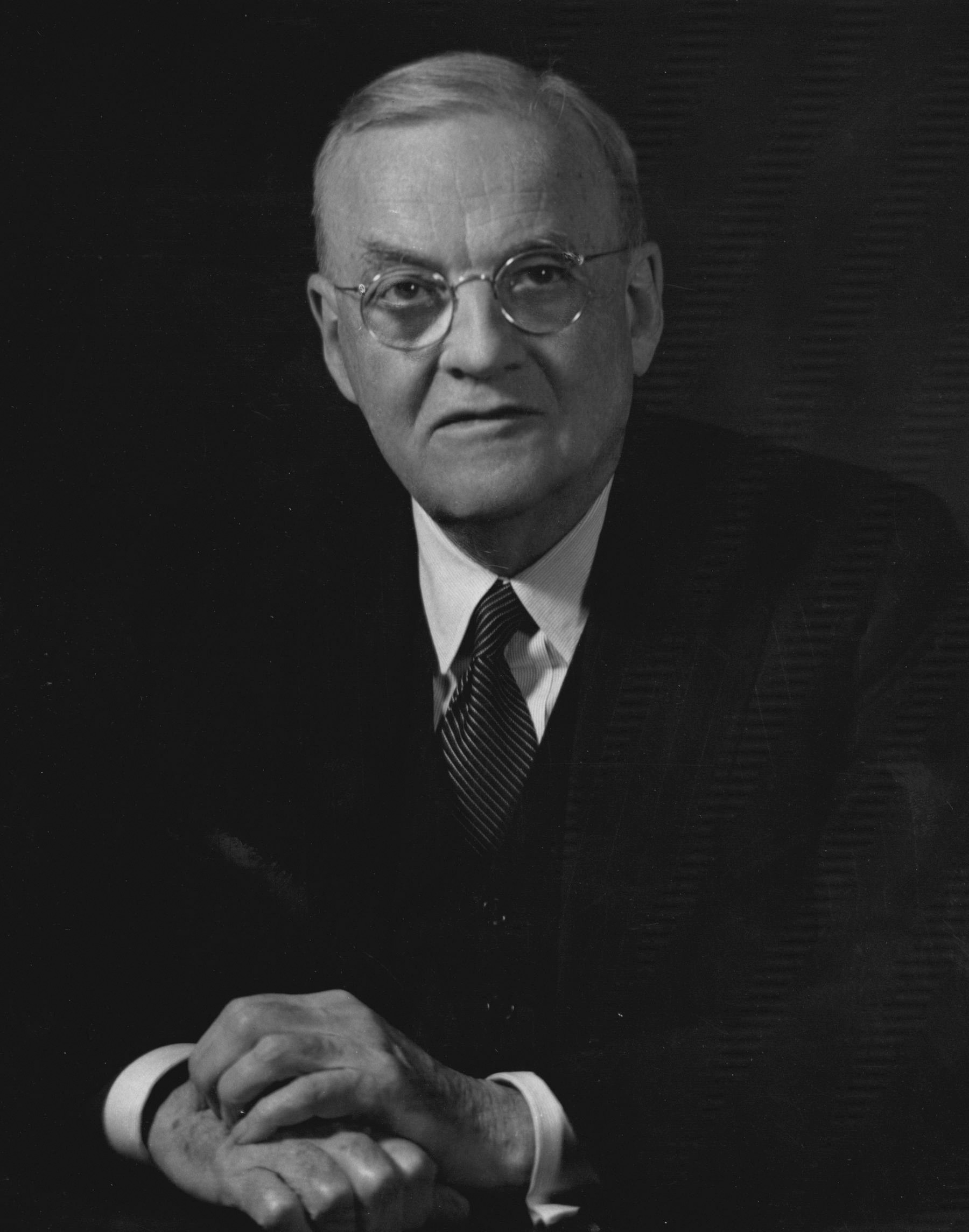
John Foster Dulles, former U.S. Secretary of State

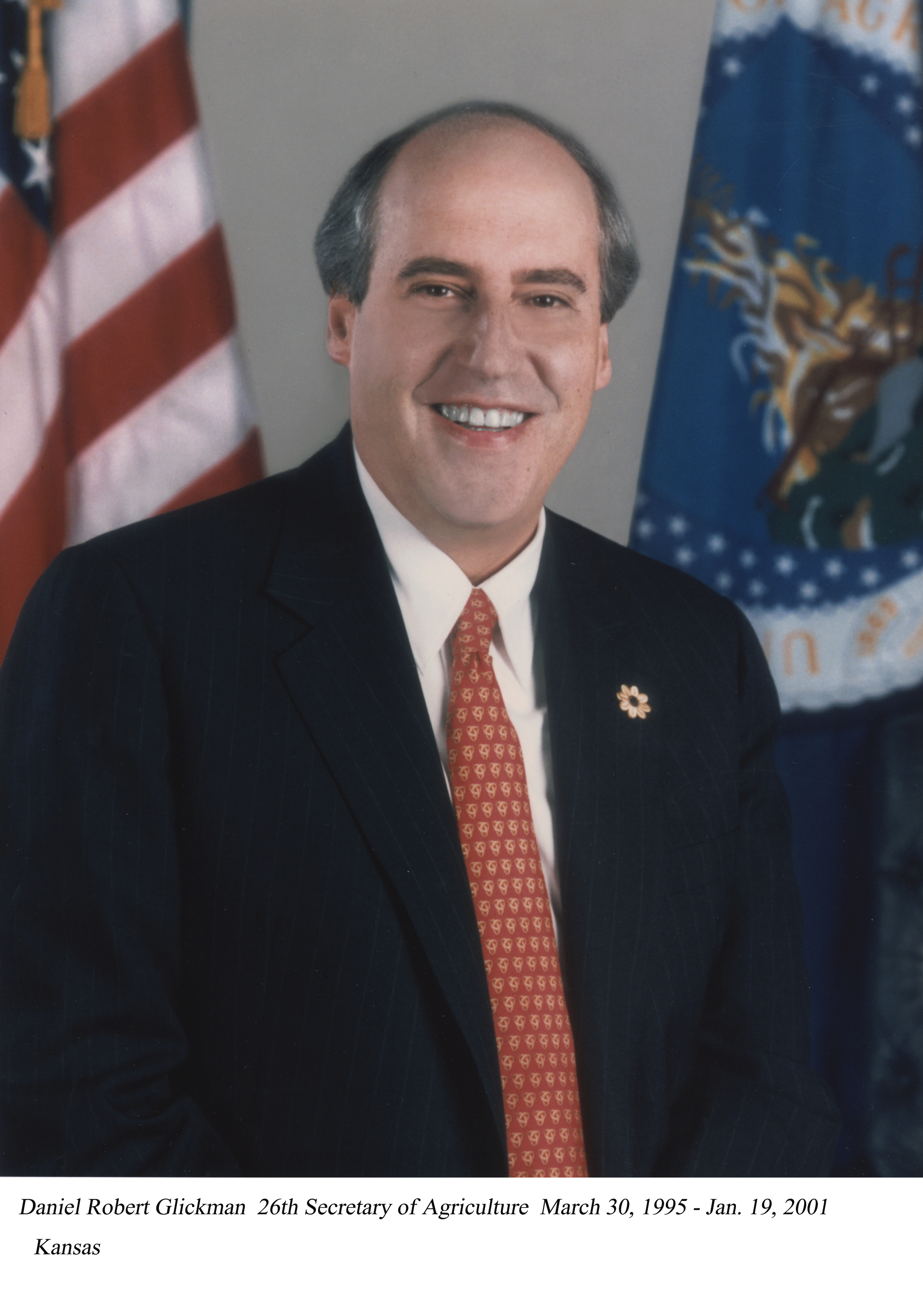
Dan Glickman, former U.S. Secretary of Agriculture and former U.S. Representative

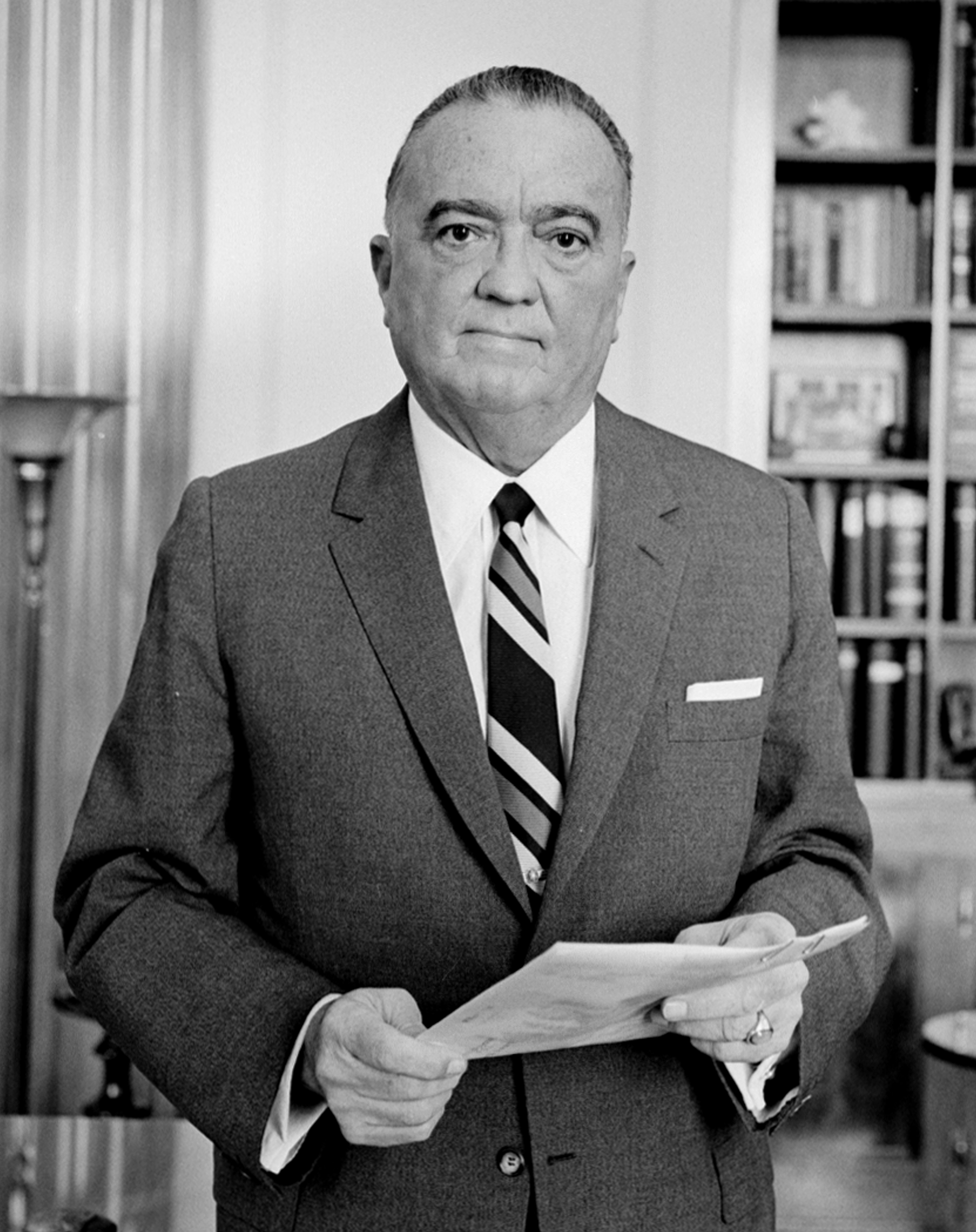
J. Edgar Hoover, first director, Federal Bureau of Investigation

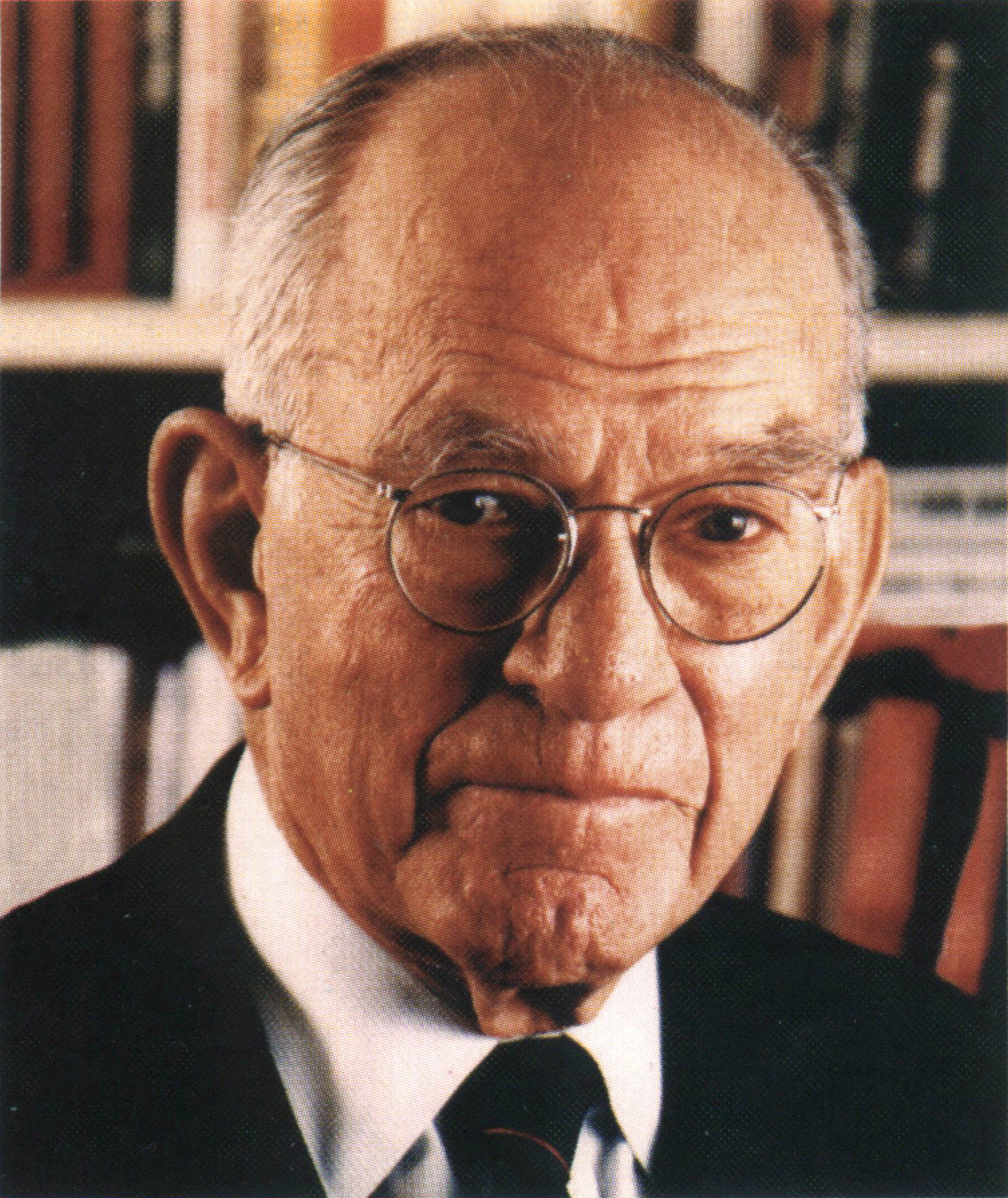
J. William Fulbright, former U.S. Senator and founder, Fulbright Program

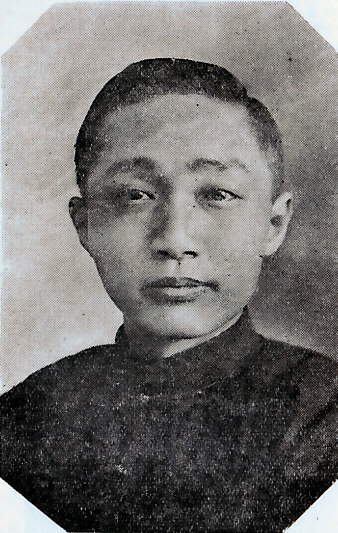
Hsu Mo, founding judge, International Court of Justice

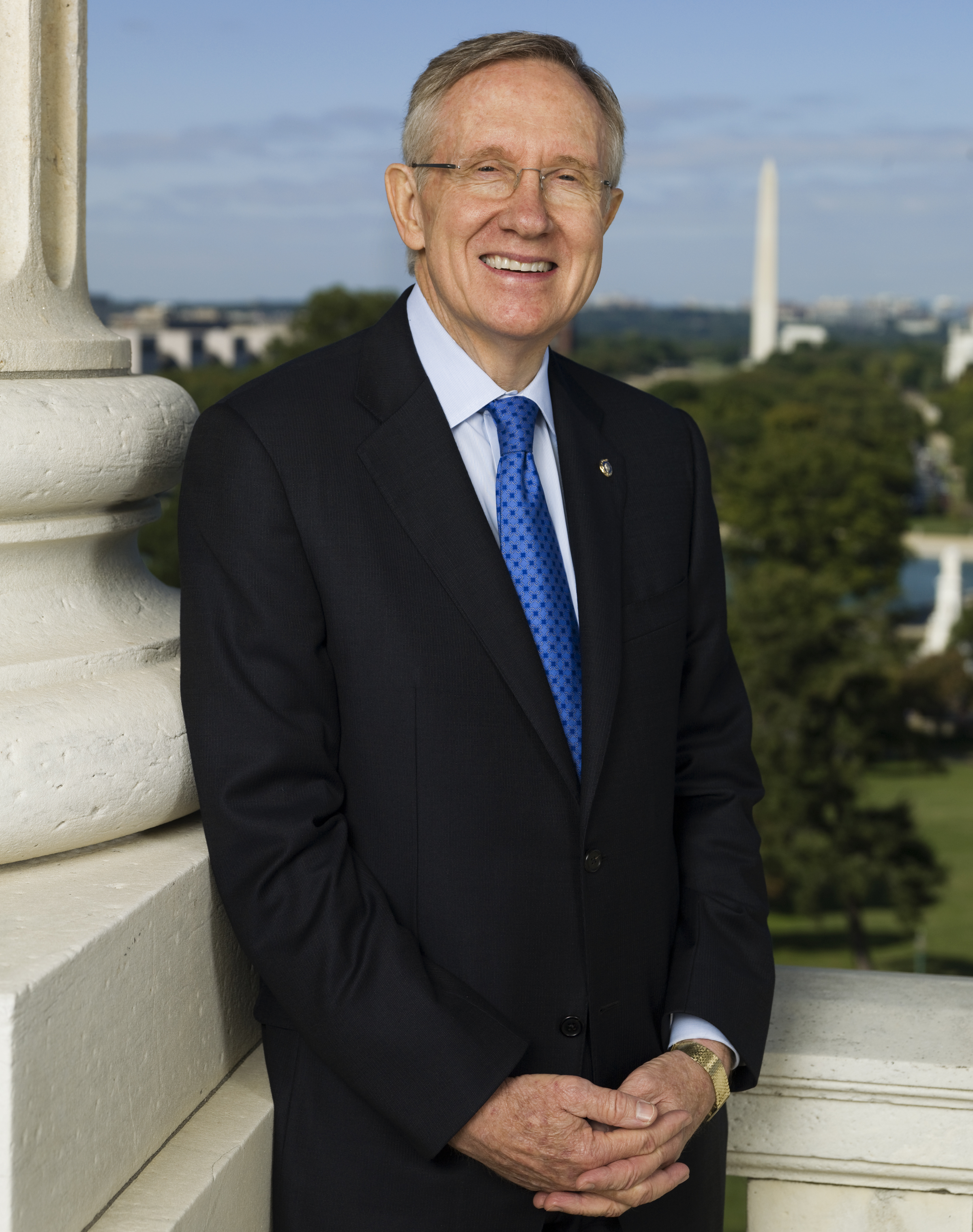
Harry Reid, former U.S. Senator and Senate Majority Leader

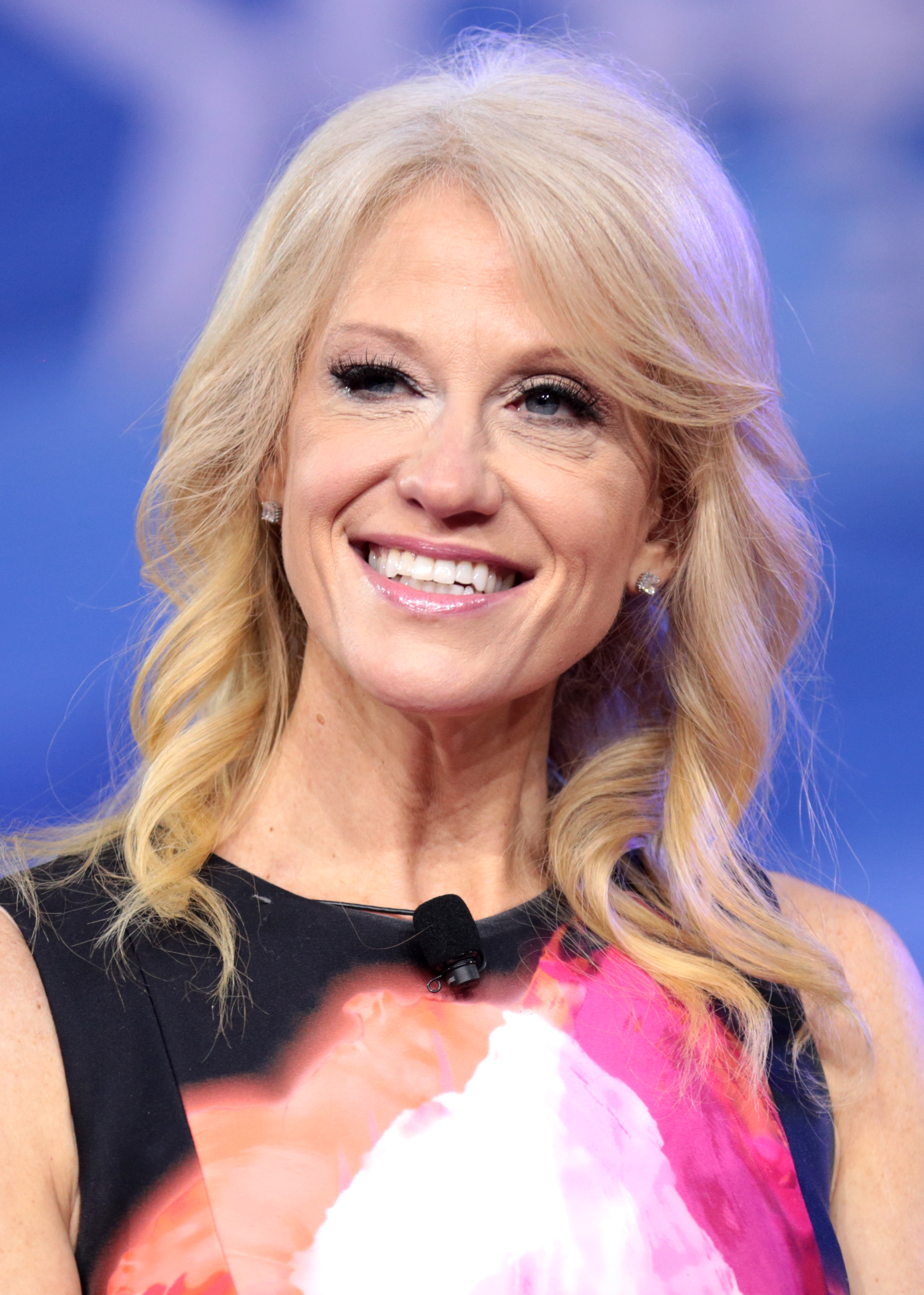
Kellyanne Conway, former Counselor to the President

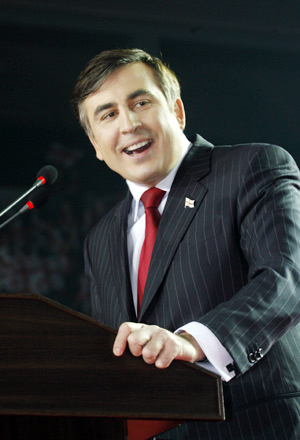
Mikheil Saakashvili, former president of Georgia

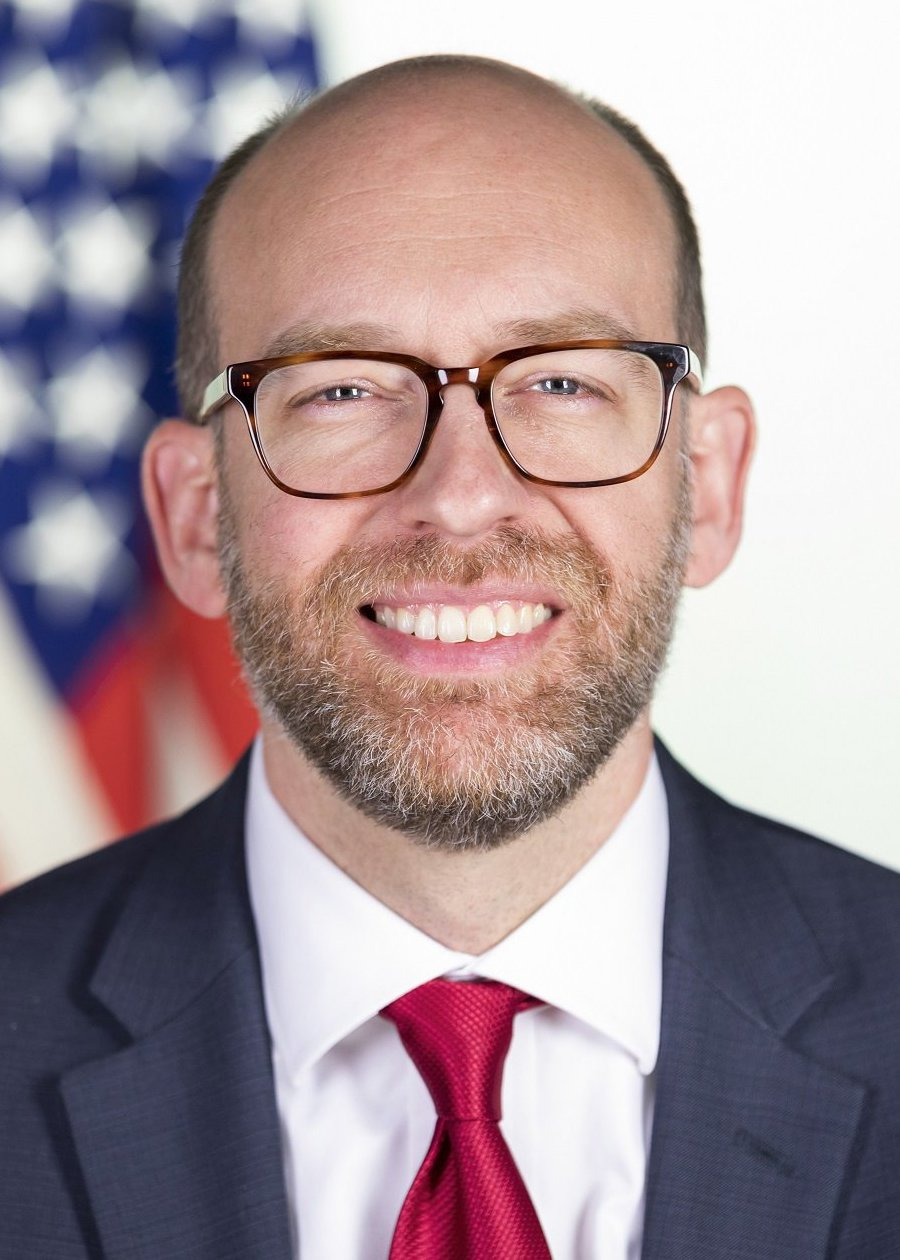
Russell Vought, director, Office of Management and Budget

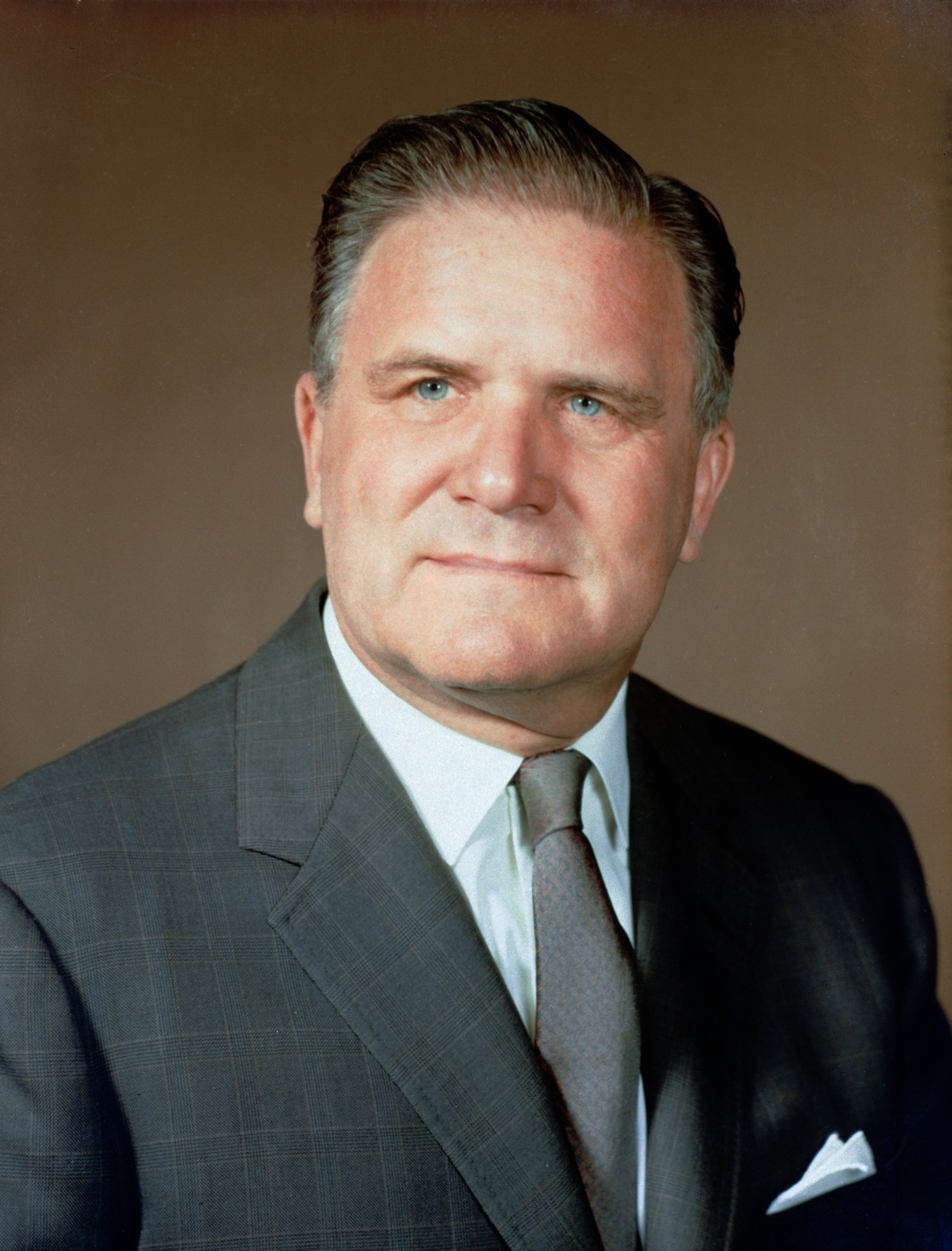
James E. Webb, former NASA administrator and namesake of James Webb Space Telescope
