= Lecciones y Ensayos =

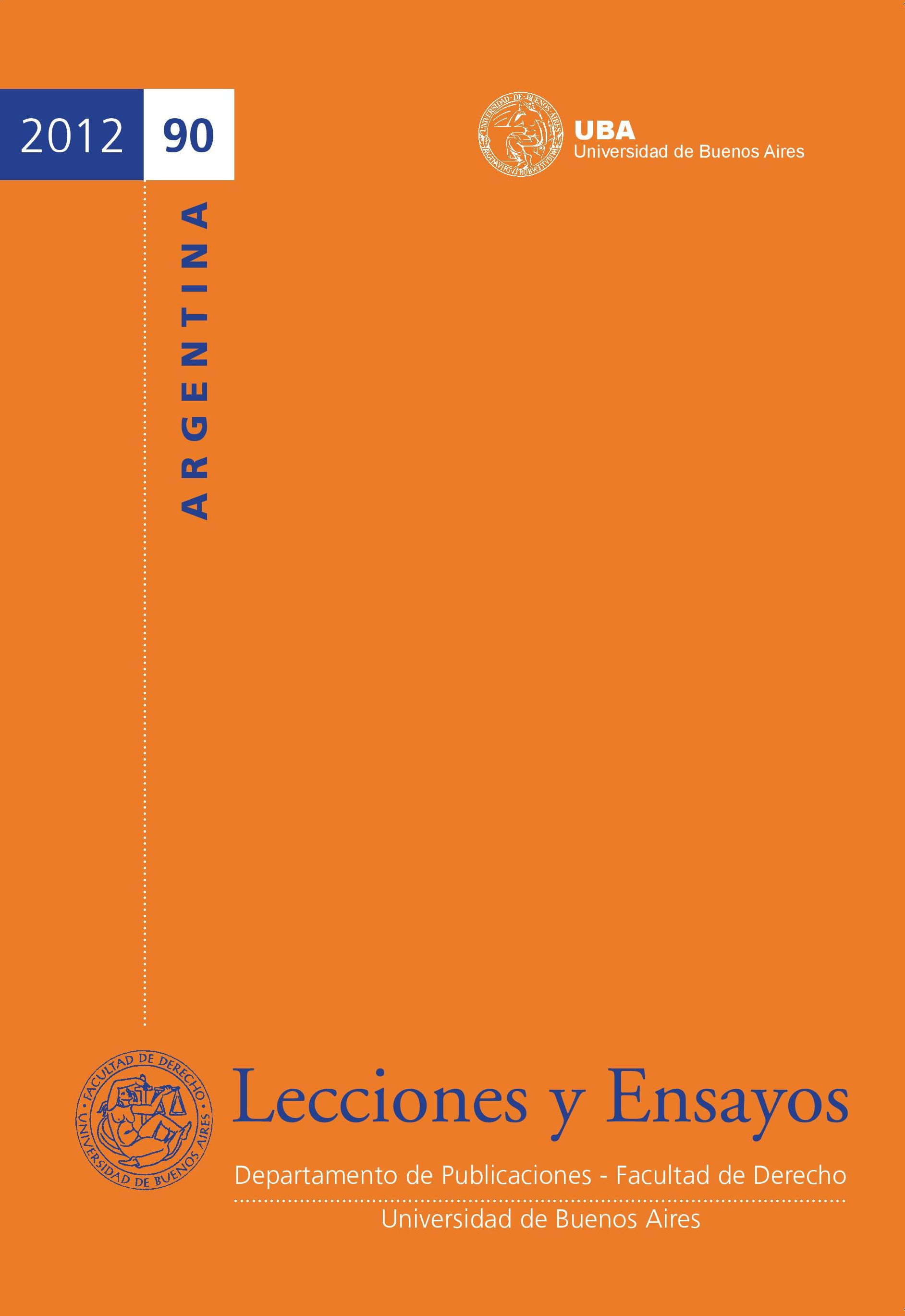
- Discipline: Law
- Language: Spanish

Publication details
- History: 1956-present
- Publisher: University of Buenos Aires School of Law (Argentina)
- Frequency: Biannually
- Open access: Yes

Standard abbreviations
- ISO 4: Lecciones Ens.

Indexing
- ISSN: 0024-0079
- LCCN: 66039206
- OCLC no.: 1755688

Links
- Journal homepage; Online archive

Lecciones y Ensayos is a biannual law review run by university students and published by the University of Buenos Aires School of Law since 1956.

== History ==
The journal was established in 1956 by Ignacio Winizky, director of the Publication Department of the University of Buenos Aires School of Law.

With the constitutional breakdown of 1976, the journal went through a period during which its publishing activity was not in charge of students. In 1983, with the return to democracy, the fundamental principles laid down by Ignacio Winizky were restored, and the journal was again run by the students of the School of Law.

== Former prominent members ==
- Carlos Fayt
- Manuel Garrido
- Luis Jiménez de Asúa
- Enrique Santiago Petracchi
