= Public Contract Law Journal =

Academic journal published by the American Bar Association

The Public Contract Law Journal (cited to as Pub. Cont. L.J.) is the official journal of the American Bar Association Section of Public Contract Law. The journal is published four-times per year addressing legal issues facing the practice of public contract and procurement law at the local and federal level.

The journal is currently edited by students at The George Washington University Law School, which sprouted from an arrangement beginning in 1995 between the school and American Bar Association. In addition, a group of editors from the American Bar Association Section of Public Contract Law reviews submissions considered for publication.

The journal is recognized in the legal academic community for its annual writing competition, attracting student notes and comments addressing public contract law topics. The journal is considered to be one of the most prestigious journals at the George Washington University Law School.
