= Institute of Competition Law =

Institute of Competition Law (French: Institut de droit de la concurrence) is a think tank focused on bringing together government regulators, private practitioners, and academics to study and shape antitrust policy on an international scale.

The Institute seeks to foster discussion about antitrust or competition law and law & economics by producing antitrust publications and hosting related conferences and events. The institute's publications include the Concurrences journal, the e-Competitions Bulletin, and a series of books. To encourage written scholarship, the Institute holds an annual writing competition and honors authors for well-written pieces in the area of antitrust and law & economics at the Antitrust Writing Awards. In addition to written works, the Institute holds frequent events, including an annual conference and topical seminars, to discuss pressing issues in antitrust.

== About the Institute ==
After practicing competition law for many years, Nicolas Charbit founded the Institute in 2004 and currently serves as its CEO. The organization maintains offices in Paris, France, London and New York City.

The Institute seeks to create an independent, objective platform for the development and discussion of antitrust law, economics, and government regulation of competition. The institute works to maintain a balanced perspective by implementing editorial boards and scientific or steering committees to oversee each of its publications and events. These boards and committees are made up of international competition law experts coming from the government, private practice, and academia. Such antitrust figures, including William Kovacic, Mario Monti, and Frédéric Jenny, serve on boards and committees for the institute.

== Concurrences ==
Concurrences is a quarterly peer-reviewed journal that is released in print and online to discuss national and European Union competition laws. The journal serves as a written forum for individuals in academia and private practice to analyze antitrust issues. In addition, representatives of the journal have interviewed influential figures in competition law, including François Hollande, Christine Lagarde, and Nicolas Sarkozy. Since its inception, Concurrences has published approximately 14,000 articles from 1,000 authors. One-quarter of these articles are printed in English. The remaining three-quarters are printed in French, as French is the official language of the European Union General Court. All articles are accompanied by an abstract in English.

A scientific committee establishes strict editing and peer review requirements that an article must satisfy in order to be published. Concurrences also categorizes each article into one of ten different formats, which signals to the reader the type of article that he/she is reading, particularly whether an article is academic or opinion in nature. The ten article formats are as follows: (1) forewords (pure opinion pieces); (2) interviews of experts; (3) trends (several short articles on a current pressing issue in antitrust); (4) law & economics (short papers by economists); (5) doctrines (longer academic papers); (6) case summaries (short analyses of recent antitrust cases); (7) legal practice (pieces for in-house counsel); (8) international (papers devoted to international antitrust policy); (9) book reviews (of longer antitrust works); and (10) article reviews (of prominent antitrust articles). The Scientific Committee seeks to strike a balance between academic and opinion pieces and, thus, includes an article from most, if not all, of the ten formats in each issue.

== E-Competitions Bulletin ==
The e-Competitions Bulletin is an online database of antitrust case summaries from 55 jurisdictions, including the United States, the European Union, and the United Kingdom. The goal of e-Competitions is to encourage direct comparison of antitrust case law and regulations across nations. Each summary includes the following: key words to make it more easily searchable, the relevant law or regulation at issue, and a link to the full, original decision in a case or the original wording of a regulation. The e-Competitions database contains over 10,000 case summaries with contributions from 2,500 authors, hailing from academia, private practice, corporations, and the government. E-Competitions has received contributions from some antitrust figures, such as Claus-Dieter Ehlermann (former DG COMP Director General), William Kolasky (Hughes Hubbard & Reed), and Ian Forrester (White & Case), and has partnered with international law firms and 14 university research centers. Like the Concurrences journal, e-Competitions is led by a diverse advisory board and editorial board.

== Books ==
The Institute publishes two series of books, the e-Competitions series and the Concurrences series. Each year, the e-Competitions series includes a Competition Digest and a Liber amicorum, also known as a Festschrift, being a book that honors a well-respected figure in the field of antitrust. It consists of articles contributed by the individual's close friends and colleagues. The Concurrences series publishes multiple works, including a compilation of speeches and discussions from the institute's conferences, the thesis chosen for the Concurrences Award, and books written by academics and attorneys in private practice.

After publishing the Concurrences journal for ten years, the Institute released Why Antitrust?, a book featuring 100 short articles by both experts and non-experts of antitrust and law and economics, including contributions from Joaquín Almunia (former EU Commissioner), Arnaud Montebourg (former Minister of the Economics), and Jean-Louis Debré (President of the Constitutional Council).

== Antitrust writing awards ==
The Antitrust Writing Awards aim to encourage scholarship in the areas of antitrust and law & economics by honoring excellent written pieces in the field. Awards are given in two separate categories, academic articles and business articles. Articles qualify for the academic category if they have been published in an academic journal during the last year. Alternatively, articles are eligible for a business award if they have appeared in a professional magazine or newsletter in the previous year. For each category, academic and business, the Institute awards the best article in each of the following eight substantive areas: (1) general topics (including articles on antitrust procedure); (2) anticompetitive practices; (3) unilateral conduct; (4) mergers; (5) intellectual property; (6) private enforcement; (7) Asian antitrust; and (8) economics. The awards are announced at an annual gala, taking place the first night before the American Bar Association Annual Antitrust Spring Meeting.

All articles are subjected to an international peer review process and vetted by a steering committee before being considered for an award. The Institute assembles separate steering committees to review academic and business articles. The Academic Steering Committee is made up of 18 antitrust figures in academia, and the Business Steering Committee is composed of 22 in-house counsels with antitrust expertise. After each steering committee narrows down the pool of articles, the Board chooses the winners in both the academic and business categories. The Board includes some of the most distinguished individuals in the fields of antitrust and law & economics: Douglas Ginsburg, Andreas Mundt, Howard Shelanski, and Joshua Wright.

== Conferences ==
The institute hosts a series of conferences and events each year to encourage scholars, regulators, and practitioners to discuss antitrust policy in person. The biggest event put on by the institute is its annual conference called New Frontiers of Antitrust. The event is held in Paris at the National Assembly or the Ministry of Economics with the EU Commissioner delivering the opening speech. Regular speakers include Wouter Wills (EU Hearing Officer), William Kovacic (George Washington University), Bruno Lasserre (Autorité de la concurrence), and Laurence Idot (University Panthéon-Sorbonne). The institute also organizes events specifically to enlighten in-house counsel about antitrust-related topics. To that end, the Institute holds 10 seminars on the topic of industrial economics and 10 seminars on antitrust law procedures over the course of a year. The institute also arranges for dinners where government enforcers, private practitioners, and in-house counsel can discuss antitrust issues.
