= Federal Circuit Bar Association =

Mediator between bar members and the Court of Appeal

- (FCBA)
- Formation: 1985
- Website: fedcirbar.org

Headquartered in Washington, DC, the Federal Circuit Bar Association (FCBA) is an organization for the bar of the Court of Appeals for the Federal Circuit. It functions as a forum for dialogue between bar members and the court and between government counsel and private practitioners.

The organization is headquartered in Washington, DC.
