= Trinity College Law Review =

- Discipline: Law review
- Language: English, Irish, French, German

Publication details
- History: 1998-present
- Publisher: Dublin University Law Society (Ireland)
- Frequency: Annually

Standard abbreviations
- Bluebook: Trinity C.L. Rev.
- ISO 4: Trinity Coll. Law Rev.

Indexing
- ISSN: 1393-5941
- LCCN: 2003250062
- OCLC no.: 41254523

Links
- Journal homepage

The Trinity College Law Review (TCLR) is a student-run law review affiliated with Trinity College Dublin School of Law. It has been published annually every March since 1998 and is available on two online legal databases: HeinOnline and Westlaw. The review publishes selected submissions in English, French, or German dealing with any area of law. Previous contributors have included Mary McAleese, Susan Denham, Pat Cox and Gerard Hogan.

== Events ==
A "Distinguished Speaker Series" was established in 2006. The 2009 discussion was on "The Law's Response to Gangland Crime in Ireland". Panellists have included James Hamilton (Director of Public Prosecutions), Carol Coulter (Irish Times), Ivana Bacik (barrister and politician), and criminal law solicitors Michael Finucane and Petter Mullan. Other topics of discussion have included "Is the Seanad Worth Saving?" (2011), "The Fusion of the Legal Professions" (2012) and "The Future of the Irish Corporate Tax Regime" (2014). Notable participants in the series have included Ruth Bader Ginsburg, Lord Hoffman, Professor Cass Sunstein and Mónica Feria Tinta.

The TCLR also hosts an annual "Authors' Night", where advice is provided to students who are considering entering submissions for the publication.

== Awards ==
A number of awards are available for those who enter submissions to the TCLR.

- In November 2009 "The Inaugural Gernot Biehler Memorial Competition" was launched. This is a casenote competition in honour of Gernot Biehler, lecturer in International Law and Conflicts of Law and Fellow of Trinity College Dublin, who died in September 2009. This competition is open to all first and second year law students in any university. The prize for the best casenote is €250.
- The "Reddy Charlton Prize" is awarded to the best article published in the review each year.
- The "Norton Rose Fulbright Internship Prize" is awarded to the best article on a topic of commercial law.
- The "FLAC Award" is awarded by Trinity FLAC to the best article on a topic of human rights or social justice.
- The "Conseil d'État Prize" is awarded to the best French article each year. This comes in the form of a summer internship at the Conseil d'État.
- The "German Language Prize" is awarded to the best German article and this also comes in the form of an internship with a law firm in Germany.

== Editorial board ==
The editorial board of the Trinity College Law Review consists of undergraduate and postgraduate law students of Trinity College Dublin. In addition to selecting and editing the articles published in the review, the board works to promote legal writing in Trinity College through workshops and guest lectures.

== Highly cited articles ==
- Stephen Ranalow, "Bearing a Constitutional Cross: Examining Blasphemy and the Judicial Role in Corway v Independent Newspapers" [2000] 3 Trinity CL Rev 95.
- Michael Kearney, "Extraterritorial Jurisdiction of the European Convention on Human Rights" [2002] 5 Trinity CL Rev 158.
