= VTB Capital plc v Nutritek International Corp =

2013 English company law case

- Court: Supreme Court
- Decided: 6 February 2013
- Citations: [2013] UKSC 5 [2013] 1 All ER 1296 [2013] BCC 514 [2013] 1 CLC 153 [2013] 1 Lloyd’s Rep 466 [2013] 2 AC 337 [2013] 1 BCLC 179 [2013] 1 All ER (Comm) 1009 [2013] 2 WLR 398
- Transcript: BAILII

Case history
- Prior action: [2012] EWCA Civ 808

Court membership
- Judges sitting: Lord Neuberger; Lord Mance; Lord Clarke; Lord Wilson; Lord Reed

Case opinions
- Lord Mance, Lord Neuberger

Keywords
- Fraud, Russian banks, piercing the veil

VTB Capital plc v Nutritek International Corp [2013] UKSC 5, [2013] 2 AC 337 is an English company law case, concerning piercing the corporate veil for fraud.

Together with the subsequent decision of the Supreme Court later the same year in Prest v Petrodel Resources Ltd [2013] UKSC 34 the Supreme Court substantially restated the English company law position in relation to piercing of the corporate veil.

== Facts ==
VTB Capital plc claimed that Nutritek, its parent and a director called Konstantin Malofeev, fraudulently misrepresented the value of dairy companies that Nutritek was selling to Russagroprom LLC. VTB was giving a $225m loan to Russagroprom to buy the dairy companies. VTB claimed that it was deceived into thinking that Russagroprom was not already under common control with Nutritek. It additionally sought to hold the owner of Nutritek, Marshall Capital Holdings, Marshall Capital LLC and the alleged controller, Konstantin Malofeev all jointly liable because of their control of Nutritek. VTB Capital was a subsidiary of the Russian state owned bank called JSC VTB Bank, but the loan facility agreement was expressed to be governed by English law. Russagroprom defaulted on the loan, and only $40m was recovered. VTB sought to amend to add claims that the court should pierce the veil of Russagroprom to make the defendants liable under the facility agreement.

== Judgment ==
=== High Court ===
Arnold J refused permission to amend and serve the proceedings out of the jurisdiction, because England was not demonstrated to be the appropriate forum. It discharged the freezing injunction that was obtained against Malofeev.

=== Court of Appeal ===
The Court of Appeal dismissed the appeal. Lloyd LJ gave the judgment. Rimer LJ and Aikens LJ concurred.

=== Supreme Court ===
The Supreme Court dismissed the appeal, Lord Mance giving the leading judgment, and holding that England was not the appropriate forum. Although the High Court had erred in interpreting Spiliada Maritime Corp v Cansulex Ltd [1987] AC 460, this did not effect its ultimate conclusion because its error favoured VTB. The High Court wrongly concluded that Russian law governed the alleged torts, but it had considered the position if English law had been applicable and found this not to be favourable. The Court of Appeal also erred in finding Russian law applicable for the torts and did not recognise the significance of the governing law, but this would not have changed the conclusion. The High Court’s exercise of discretion could not be faulted or set aside. It was unnecessary to resolve whether the court could not pierce the veil but this could not succeed in any case. The allegation would be an extension of existing law, so that there could be piercing if someone controlled a company, as if they had been a co-contracting partner. A strong justification would be required, and there was an overwhelming case against extension because the law provided redress against the controller in a misrepresentation action. It would be wrong to treat another defendant as party to the contract where none of the actual parties had intended this. The facts did not involve Russagroprom being used as a facade to conceal true facts. The worldwide freezing injunction would be discharged, and it was unsatisfactory given the length of litigation.

Lord Neuberger gave a concurring judgment. While not technically necessary, he said the following on piercing the corporate veil.

120. We were referred to a number of cases where courts have either granted relief on the basis of piercing the corporate veil, or where courts have proceeded on the assumption, or concluded, that there is power to do so. The only case in that connection in the House of Lords, or Supreme Court, to which we were referred, was Woolfson v Strathclyde Regional Council 1978 SLT 159, a case where, on the facts, the House of Lords had no difficulty in rejecting an argument that the corporate veil could be pierced. At 1978 SLT 159, 161, Lord Keith suggested that the court could only take such a course "where special circumstances exist indicating that [the involvement of the company] is a mere façade concealing the true facts".

[...]

122. The starting point for the argument that the principle does not exist is the well known decision in Salomon v A Salomon & Co Ltd [1897] AC 22. There is great force in the argument that that case represented an early attempt to pierce the veil of incorporation, and it failed, pursuant to a unanimous decision of the House of Lords, not on the facts, but as a matter of principle. Thus, at 30-31, Lord Halsbury LC said that a "legally incorporated" company "must be treated like any other independent person with its rights and liabilities appropriate to itself …, whatever may have been the ideas or schemes of those who brought it into existence". He added that it was "impossible to say at the same time that there is a company and there is not."

123. The notion that there is no principled basis upon which it can be said that one can pierce the veil of incorporation receives some support from the fact that the precise nature, basis and meaning of the principle are all somewhat obscure, as are the precise nature of circumstances in which the principle can apply. Clarke J in The Tjaskemolen [1997] 2 Lloyd's Rep 465, 471 rightly said that "[t]he cases have not worked out what is meant by 'piercing the corporate veil'. It may not always mean the same thing" (and to the same effect, see Palmer's Company Law, para 2.1533). Munby J in Ben Hashem seems to have seen the principle as a remedial one, whereas Sir Andrew Morritt V-C in Trustor AB v Smallbone (No 2) [2001] 1 WLR 1177 appears to have treated the principle as triggered by the finding of a "façade".

124. The "façade" mentioned by Lord Keith is often regarded as something of a touchstone in the cases – e.g. per Munby J in Ben Hashem, para 164, and per Sir Andrew Morritt V-C in Trustor, para 23. Words such as "façade", and other expressions found in the cases, such as "the true facts", "sham", "mask", "cloak", "device", or "puppet" may be useful metaphors. However, such pejorative expressions are often dangerous, as they risk assisting moral indignation to triumph over legal principle, and, while they may enable the court to arrive at a result which seems fair in the case in question, they can also risk causing confusion and uncertainty in the law. The difficulty which Diplock LJ expressed in Snook v London and West Riding Investments Ltd [1967] 2 QB 786, 802, as to the precise meaning of "sham" in connection with contracts, may be equally applicable to an expression such as "façade".

125. Mr Lazarus argued that in all, or at least almost all, the cases where the principle was actually applied, it was either common ground that the principle existed (Gilford Motor Co Ltd v Horne [1933] Ch 935, Re H (restraint order: realisable property) [1996] 2 BCLC 500, and Trustor) and/or the result achieved by piercing the veil of incorporation could have been achieved by a less controversial route - for instance, through the law of agency (In re Darby, Ex p Brougham [1911] 1 KB 95, Gilford, and Jones v Lipman [1962] 1 WLR 832), through statutory interpretation (Daimler Company Ltd v Continental Tyre and Rubber Company (Great Britain) Ltd [1916] 2 AC 307, Merchandise Transport Ltd v British Transport Commission [1962] 2 QB 173, Wood Preservation Ltd v Prior [1969] 1 WLR 1077, and Re A Company [1985] BCLC 333), or on the basis that, as stated by Lord Goff in Goss v Chilcott [1996] AC 788, 798, money due to an individual which he directs to his company is treated as received by him (Gencor ACP Ltd v Dalby [2000] 2 BCLC 734, and Trustor).

126. In summary, therefore, the case for Mr Malofeev is that piercing the corporate veil is contrary to high authority, inconsistent with principle, and unnecessary to achieve justice.

127. I see the force of this argument, but there are points the other way. I am not convinced that all the cases where the court has pierced the veil can be explained on the basis advanced by Mr Lazarus. Further, as Mr Howard QC said, the fact is that those cases were decided on the basis of piercing the veil. More generally, it may be right for the law to permit the veil to be pierced in certain circumstances in order to defeat injustice. In addition, there are other cases, notably Adams v Cape Industries plc [1990] Ch 433, where the principle was held to exist (albeit that they include obiter observations and are anyway not binding in this court). It is also difficult to explain the first instance decision in Kensington International Ltd v Republic of the Congo [2005] EWHC 2684 (Comm), [2006] 2 BCLC 296 on any basis other than the principle (but I am not at all sure that the case was rightly decided – see Continental Transfert Technique Ltd v Federal Government of Nigeria [2009] EWHC 2898 (Comm), paras 27-29). Further, the existence of the principle is accepted by all the leading textbooks – see Palmer op. cit, Gore-Browne on Companies at paras 7[3] to 7[6], Gower and Davies on Principles of Modern Company Law (8th ed) at paras 8-5 to 8-14, and Farrar's Company Law (4th ed), pp 69-78.

[...]

129. In its recent decision in La Générale des Carrières et des Mines v F G Hemisphere Associates LLC [2012] UKPC 27, para 24, the Judicial Committee of the Privy Council, in a judgment given by Lord Mance, was prepared to assume that the appellant was right in contending that it was open to a court in this jurisdiction to pierce the corporate veil, but it is to be noted that this was not challenged by the respondent. In para 27, reference was made to Case concerning Barcelona Traction, Light, and Power Company, Ltd [1970] ICJ 3, in which, it was said,

"[T]he International Court of Justice referred (para 56) to municipal law practice to lift the corporate veil … 'for instance, to prevent the misuse of the privileges of legal personality, as in certain cases of fraud or malfeasance, to protect third persons such as a creditor or purchaser, or to prevent the evasion of legal requirements or of obligations'".

However, at para 27, Lord Mance pointed out that Barcelona Traction concerned "international legal considerations, indicating that there may not always be a precise equation between factors relevant to the lifting of the corporate veil under domestic and international law."

130. In my view, it is unnecessary and inappropriate to resolve the issue of whether we should decide that, unless any statute relied on in the particular case expressly or impliedly provides otherwise, the court cannot pierce the veil of incorporation. It is unnecessary, because the second argument raised on behalf of Mr Malofeev, to which I shall shortly turn, persuades me that VTB cannot succeed on this issue. It is inappropriate because this is an interlocutory appeal, and it would therefore be wrong (absent special circumstances) to decide an issue of such general importance if it is unnecessary to do so.

[...]

132. In so far as VTB invokes the principle of piercing the veil of incorporation, its case involves what, at best for its point of view, may be characterised as an extension to the circumstances where it has traditionally been held that the corporate veil can be pierced. It is an extension because it would lead to the person controlling the company being held liable as if he had been a co-contracting party with the company concerned to a contract where the company was a party and he was not. In other words, unlike virtually all the cases where the court has pierced the corporate veil, VTB is claiming that Mr Malofeev should be treated as if he were, or had been, a co-contracting party with RAP under the two agreements, even though neither Mr Malofeev nor any of the contracting parties (including VTB) intended Mr Malofeev to be a party.

133. The notion that the principle can be extended to such a case receives no support from any case save for a very recent decision of Burton J, Antonio Gramsci Shipping Corporation v Stepanovs [2011] EWHC 333 (Comm), [2011] 1 Lloyd's Rep 647 (which he followed in his later decision in Alliance Bank JSC v Aquanta Corporation [2011] EWHC 3281 (Comm) [2012] 1 Lloyd's Rep 181, which was considered by the Court of Appeal at [2012] EWCA Civ 1588). None of the other decisions relied on by VTB in this connection is, on analysis, of assistance to its case.

134. In Gilford, Mr Horne had undertaken not to compete with his former employer, and a company, in which only he and his wife were shareholders, and which he formed after leaving his employment, was enjoined from competing. He effectively broke his undertaking by trading through the company, in the same way as if it had been carrying on the competing business through his wife – as indeed had happened in Smith v Hancock [1894] 2 Ch 377, 385, a case relied on by the Court of Appeal in Gilford. Thus, the decision in Gilford had nothing to do with the fact that a company was involved, and therefore, as a matter of logic, the decision cannot have been based on piercing the corporate veil – a point made by Toulson J in Yukong Line at 308, and rightly accepted by Arnold J and the Court of Appeal in this case.

135. The same point (as was said in Yukong Line) applies to Jones v Lipman, which I do not find an entirely easy case. After agreeing to sell a property to a purchaser, the vendor sold the same property to a company owned by him and his wife, and the purchaser obtained an order for specific performance against the company. On the judge's reasoning, it would have equally been entitled to do so if, instead of the company, the property had been transferred to the vendor's wife. Another view of Jones is that the sale by the vendor to the company was treated as a sham transaction.

[...]

137. The fact that there has been no case (until Gramsci) where the power to pierce the corporate veil has been extended in the way for which VTB contends in these proceedings does not necessarily mean that VTB's case, in so far as it is based on piercing the veil, must fail. However, given that the principle is subject to the criticisms discussed above, it seems to me that strong justification would be required before the court would be prepared to extend it. Once one subjects the proposed extension to analysis, I consider that it is plain that it cannot be sustained: far from there being a strong case for the proposed extension, there is an overwhelming case against it.

138. First, it is not suggested by VTB that any of the other contracting parties under the two agreements is not liable. Indeed, as mentioned above, VTB's proposed pleaded case is that Mr Malofeev is "jointly and severally liable with RAP". Even accepting that the court can pierce the corporate veil in some circumstances, the notion of such joint and several liability is inconsistent with the reasoning and decision in Salomon. A company should be treated as being a person by the law in the same way as a human being. The fact that a company can only act or think through humans does not call that point into question: it just means that the law of agency will always potentially be in play, but, it will, at least normally, be the company which is the principal, not an agent. On VTB's case, if the agency analogy is relevant, the company, as the contracting party, is the quasi-agent, not the quasi-principal.

139. Subject to some other rule (such as that of undisclosed principal), where B and C are the contracting parties and A is not, there is simply no justification for holding A responsible for B's contractual liabilities to C simply because A controls B and has made misrepresentations about B to induce C to enter into the contract. This could not be said to result in unfairness to C: the law provides redress for C against A, in the form of a cause of action in negligent or fraudulent misrepresentation.

140. In any event, it would be wrong to hold that Mr Malofeev should be treated as if he was a party to an agreement, in circumstances where (i) at the time the agreement was entered into, none of the actual parties to the agreement intended to contract with him, and he did not intend to contract with them, and (ii) thereafter, Mr Malofeev never conducted himself as if, or led any other party to believe, he was liable under the agreement. That that is the right approach seems to me to follow from one of the most fundamental principles on which contractual liabilities and rights are based, namely what an objective reasonable observer would believe was the effect of what the parties to the contract, or alleged contract, communicated to each other by words and actions, as assessed in their context – see e.g. Smith v Hughes (1871) LR 6 QB 597, 607.

[...]

142. Quite apart from this, it seems to me that the facts relied on by VTB to justify piercing the veil of incorporation in this case do not involve RAP being used as "a façade concealing the true facts". In my view, if the corporate veil is to be pierced, "the true facts" must mean that, in reality, it is the person behind the company, rather than the company, which is the relevant actor or recipient (as the case may be). Here, on VTB's case, "the true facts" relate to the control, trading performance, and value of the Dairy Companies (if one considers the specific allegations against Mr Malofeev), or to the genuineness of the nature of the underlying arrangement (which involves a transfer of assets between companies in common ownership). Neither of these features can be said to involve RAP being used as a "façade to conceal the true facts".

143. It was suggested, however, by Mr Howard QC that the case against Mr Malofeev involves him "abusing the corporate structure", and that that is sufficient to justify piercing the corporate veil. However, in my view, abuse of the corporate structure (whatever that expression means) adds nothing to the debate, at least in this case. It may be another way of describing use of the company as a façade to conceal the true facts (in which case it adds nothing to Lord Keith's characterisation in Woolfson), or it may be an additional requirement before the corporate veil will be pierced: otherwise, it seems to me that it would be an illegitimate extension of the circumstances in which the veil can be pierced.

144. It is true that in many civil law systems, abuse of rights is a well recognised concept, and it may be appropriate for a domestic court to apply such a principle in relation to some areas of EU law. However, it was not suggested to us that it should be applied as a new or separate ground in domestic law for treating Mr Malofeev as contractually liable to VTB, or that it would assist VTB in this case.

145. Accordingly, in agreement with the Court of Appeal and for substantially the same reasons, I consider that VTB's contention represents an extension to the circumstances in which the court will pierce the corporate veil, and on analysis it is an extension which is contrary to authority and contrary to principle.

Lord Wilson concurred with Lord Mance and Lord Neuberger. He said the following on the corporate veil point.

In that this court welcomes blue sky thinking, I do not criticise Mr Lazarus for his over-arching attempt to persuade it that English law recognises no principle that the corporate veil may ever be lifted. In my view, however, and notwithstanding the difficulty of being able to define within one sentence the circumstances in which the law will – perhaps – lift the corporate veil, such was a highly ambitious submission. But this is not the place at which to embark on an attempted subjection of it to critical examination.

Lord Clarke gave a judgment, dissenting on the question of forum, while reserving any comments on the corporate veil for a future case.

Lord Reed dissented regarding forum, and agreed with Lord Neuberger there were strong reasons against piercing the veil.

== See also ==
- UK company law
