= Prest v Petrodel Resources Ltd =

UK legal case

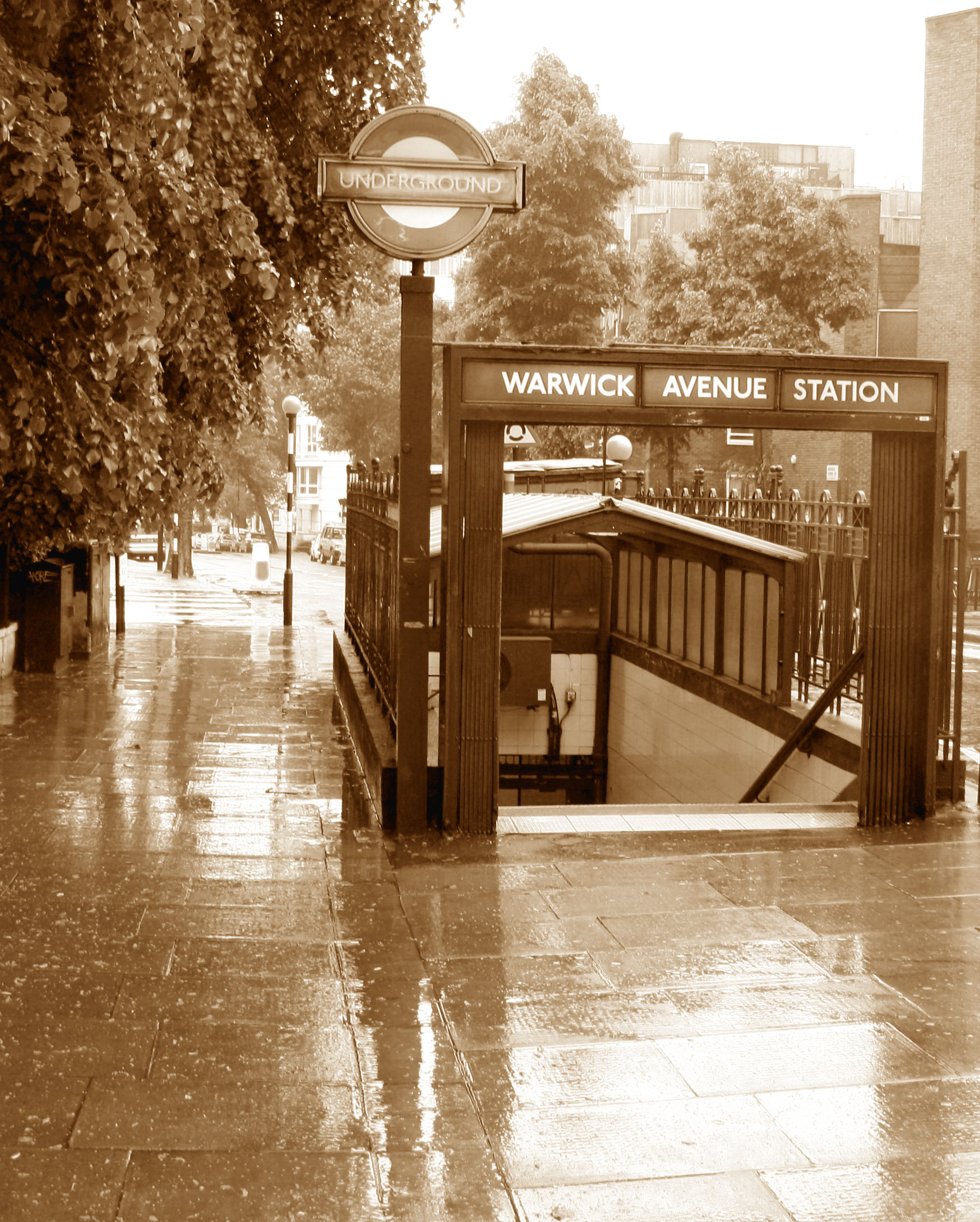
- Court: Supreme Court
- Decided: 12 June 2013
- Citations: [2013] UKSC 34 [2013] 4 All ER 673 [2013] Fam Law 953 [2013] 2 FLR 732 [2013] BCC 571 [2013] 2 AC 415 [2013] 3 WLR 1
- Transcript: BAILII

Case history
- Prior actions: Petrodel Resources Ltd v Prest [2012] EWCA Civ 1395, [2013] 2 WLR 557, [2013] 1 All ER 795, appeal allowed from YP v MP [2011] EWHC 2956

Court membership
- Judges sitting: Lord Neuberger, Lord Walker, Lady Hale, Lord Mance, Lord Clarke, Lord Wilson, Lord Sumption

Keywords
- Piercing the corporate veil, resulting trust, bare trust, Matrimonial Causes Act 1973

Prest v Petrodel Resources Ltd [2013] UKSC 34, [2013] 2 AC 415 is a leading UK company law decision of the UK Supreme Court concerning the nature of the doctrine of piercing the corporate veil, resulting trusts and equitable proprietary remedies in the context of English family law.

== Facts ==
Ms Yasmin Prest claimed under Matrimonial Causes Act 1973 sections 23 and 24 for ancillary relief against the offshore companies solely owned by Mr Michael Prest. Mrs Prest said they held legal title to properties that he beneficially owned, including a £4m house at 16 Warwick Avenue, London. They had married in 1993 and divorced in 2008. He did not comply with orders for full and frank disclosure of his financial position, and the companies did not file a defence. The Matrimonial Causes Act 1973 section 24 required that for a court to be able to order a transfer a property, Mr Prest had to be ‘entitled’ to the properties held by his companies. Mr Prest contended that he was not entitled to the properties.

== Judgment ==
=== High Court ===
Moylan J, in the Family Division of the High Court, held that Mr Prest had the ability to transfer the properties in practice, so he was “entitled” to them under MCA 1973 s 24(1)(a). The court therefore had jurisdiction to make a transfer order. He ordered Mr Prest to transfer to the wife six properties and an interest in a seventh which were held in the name of two of the husband’s companies. He rejected the husband had done anything improper relating to the companies to allow piercing the corporate veil. But under MCA 1973 s 24(1)(a) ancillary relief was wider. Because Mr Prest’s properties were worth £37.5 million, Mrs Prest’s fair award was valued at £17.5m. In reviewing the law as it relates to piercing the corporate veil, he noted the following principles:

- Ownership and control were not in themselves sufficient to pierce the corporate veil.
- Even where there was no unconnected third party interest the veil could not be pierced only because it is necessary in the interests of justice.
- The veil can only be pierced if there is impropriety.
- The impropriety must be linked to the use of the company structure to avoid or conceal liability.
- In order to pierce the veil, both control by the wrongdoer and impropriety must be demonstrated.
- A company may be a façade even though originally incorporated without deceptive intent.

In that regard, he found that piercing was justified, not under the general principles, but by virtue of the Act. The husband's properties were worth approximately £37.5 million, and therefore the wife's fair award was valued at £17.5 million.

=== Court of Appeal ===
The Court of Appeal, with Rimer LJ and Patten LJ in the majority, allowed an appeal by the companies. The Family Division’s practice of treating the assets of companies substantially owned by one party to the marriage as available for distribution under MCA 1973 section 24(1)(a) was beyond the jurisdiction of the court unless the corporate personality of the company was being abused. The corporate form needed to be used for an improper purpose, or it had to be shown that the companies held the properties on trust for Mr Prest. Because Munby J had rejected these possibilities in Ben Hashem v Al Shayif his order must have been incorrect. In the majority's view, this conflicted with Salomon v A Salomon & Co Ltd, as affirmed in Woolfson v Strathclyde Regional Council and Adams v Cape Industries plc. Patten LJ commented on other Family Division cases leading to similar results.

161. [...] They have led judges of the Family Division to adopt and develop an approach to company owned assets in ancillary relief applications which amounts almost to a separate system of legal rules unaffected by the relevant principles of English property and company law. That must now cease.

Thorpe LJ (a former judge of the Family Division) dissented, and said the following.

64. In this case the reality is plain. So long as the marriage lasted, the husband's companies were milked to provide him and his family with an extravagant lifestyle. That was only possible because the companies were wholly owned and controlled by the husband and there were no third party interests. Of course in so operating them husband ignored all company law requirements and checks. 65. Once the marriage broke down, the husband resorted to an array of strategies, of varying degrees of ingenuity and dishonesty, in order to deprive his wife of her accustomed affluence. Amongst them is his invocation of company law measures in an endeavour to achieve his irresponsible and selfish ends. If the law permits him so to do it defeats the Family Division judge's overriding duty to achieve a fair result.

=== Supreme Court ===
The Supreme Court unanimously overturned the Court of Appeal and held that Mr Prest beneficially owned the assets of the Petrodel Resources Ltd companies under a resulting trust because he contributed to their purchase price. There was no need to pierce the corporate veil, which could only be done in limited situations. However, because Mr Prest had been "entitled" to the assets of his companies under a resulting trust, under the Matrimonial Causes Act 1973 section 24 the court had jurisdiction to transfer half the value of the properties to Mrs Prest.

Lord Sumption gave the first judgment. He said there was only a limited power to pierce the corporate veil, namely when people were under an existing legal obligation which is deliberately evaded. Fraud cuts through everything. A veil could be pierced only for the purpose of depriving the company or its controller of the advantage they would otherwise obtain from the company’s separate legal personality. There had been no evidence that Mr Prest had set up the companies to avoid any obligations in these divorce proceedings, so there was no ground for piercing the corporate veil. The same was true under the MCA 1973 s 24. This did invoke property concepts with established meanings, and did not mean something different in matrimonial proceedings. If someone did try to frustrate a claim, the MCA 1973 section 37 made provision for setting aside certain dispositions. The jurisdiction that Munby J purported to recognise would, however, cut across the statutory schemes of company and insolvency law that protected people dealing with a company. So, MCA 1973 section 24 did not give judges power to order Mr Prest to transfer property that he was not entitled to in law. However, on the facts, the Petrodel Resources Ltd companies could be ordered to transfer the properties under MCA 1973 section 24 because they belonged to him beneficially: under a resulting trust. The evidence was obscure, but this was because of Mr Prest’s obstruction and mendacity. He said the following.

Piercing the corporate veil

16. I should first of all draw attention to the limited sense in which this issue arises at all. "Piercing the corporate veil" is an expression rather indiscriminately used to describe a number of different things. Properly speaking, it means disregarding the separate personality of the company. There is a range of situations in which the law attributes the acts or property of a company to those who control it, without disregarding its separate legal personality. The controller may be personally liable, generally in addition to the company, for something that he has done as its agent or as a joint actor. Property legally vested in a company may belong beneficially to the controller, if the arrangements in relation to the property are such as to make the company its controller's nominee or trustee for that purpose. For specific statutory purposes, a company's legal responsibility may be engaged by the acts or business of an associated company. Examples are the provisions of the Companies Acts governing group accounts or the rules governing infringements of competition law by "firms", which may include groups of companies conducting the relevant business as an economic unit. Equitable remedies, such as an injunction or specific performance may be available to compel the controller whose personal legal responsibility is engaged to exercise his control in a particular way. But when we speak of piercing the corporate veil, we are not (or should not be) speaking of any of these situations, but only of those cases which are true exceptions to the rule in Salomon v A Salomon & Co Ltd, i.e. where a person who owns and controls a company is said in certain circumstances to be identified with it in law by virtue of that ownership and control.

17. Most advanced legal systems recognise corporate legal personality while acknowledging some limits to its logical implications. In civil law jurisdictions, the juridical basis of the exceptions is generally the concept of abuse of rights, to which the International Court of Justice was referring in In re Barcelona Traction, Light and Power Co Ltd when it derived from municipal law a limited principle permitting the piercing of the corporate veil in cases of misuse, fraud, malfeasance or evasion of legal obligations. These examples illustrate the breadth, at least as a matter of legal theory, of the concept of abuse of rights, which extends not just to the illegal and improper invocation of a right but to its use for some purpose collateral to that for which it exists.

18. English law has no general doctrine of this kind. But it has a variety of specific principles which achieve the same result in some cases. One of these principles is that the law defines the incidents of most legal relationships between persons (natural or artificial) on the fundamental assumption that their dealings are honest. The same legal incidents will not necessarily apply if they are not. The principle was stated in its most absolute form by Denning LJ in a famous dictum in Lazarus Estates Ltd v Beasley:

"No court in this land will allow a person to keep an advantage which he has obtained by fraud. No judgment of a court, no order of a Minister, can be allowed to stand if it has been obtained by fraud. Fraud unravels everything. The court is careful not to find fraud unless it is distinctly pleaded and proved; but once it is proved, it vitiates judgments, contracts and all transactions whatsoever…"

The principle is mainly familiar in the context of contracts and other consensual arrangements, in which the effect of fraud is to vitiate consent so that the transaction becomes voidable ab initio. But it has been applied altogether more generally, in cases which can be rationalised only on grounds of public policy, for example to justify setting aside a public act such as a judgment, which is in no sense consensual, a jurisdiction which has existed since at least 1775. Or to abrogate a right derived from a legal status, such as marriage. Or to disapply a statutory time bar which on the face of the statute applies. These decisions (and there are others) illustrate a broader principle governing cases in which the benefit of some apparently absolute legal principle has been obtained by dishonesty. The authorities show that there are limited circumstances in which the law treats the use of a company as a means of evading the law as dishonest for this purpose.

[...]

34. These considerations reflect the broader principle that the corporate veil may be pierced only to prevent the abuse of corporate legal personality. It may be an abuse of the separate legal personality of a company to use it to evade the law or to frustrate its enforcement. It is not an abuse to cause a legal liability to be incurred by the company in the first place. It is not an abuse to rely upon the fact (if it is a fact) that a liability is not the controller's because it is the company's. On the contrary, that is what incorporation is all about....

35. I conclude that there is a limited principle of English law which applies when a person is under an existing legal obligation or liability or subject to an existing legal restriction which he deliberately evades or whose enforcement he deliberately frustrates by interposing a company under his control. The court may then pierce the corporate veil for the purpose, and only for the purpose, of depriving the company or its controller of the advantage that they would otherwise have obtained by the company's separate legal personality. The principle is properly described as a limited one, because in almost every case where the test is satisfied, the facts will in practice disclose a legal relationship between the company and its controller which will make it unnecessary to pierce the corporate veil.

[...]

52. Whether assets legally vested in a company are beneficially owned by its controller is a highly fact-specific issue. It is not possible to give general guidance going beyond the ordinary principles and presumptions of equity, especially those relating to gifts and resulting trusts. But I venture to suggest, however tentatively, that in the case of the matrimonial home, the facts are quite likely to justify the inference that the property was held on trust for a spouse who owned and controlled the company. In many, perhaps most cases, the occupation of the company's property as the matrimonial home of its controller will not be easily justified in the company's interest, especially if it is gratuitous. The intention will normally be that the spouse in control of the company intends to retain a degree of control over the matrimonial home which is not consistent with the company's beneficial ownership. Of course, structures can be devised which give a different impression, and some of them will be entirely genuine. But where, say, the terms of acquisition and occupation of the matrimonial home are arranged between the husband in his personal capacity and the husband in his capacity as the sole effective agent of the company (or someone else acting at his direction), judges exercising family jurisdiction are entitled to be sceptical about whether the terms of occupation are really what they are said to be, or are simply a sham to conceal the reality of the husband's beneficial ownership.

Lord Neuberger emphasised that piercing the corporate veil should be the last resort. He noted that in other Commonwealth countries there was also little consensus. In Australia, "there is no common, unifying principle, which underlies the occasional decision of courts to pierce the corporate veil", and that "there is no principled approach to be derived from the authorities". In Canada, "[t]he law on when a court may … '[lift] the corporate veil' … follows no consistent principle". In New Zealand, "'to lift the corporate veil' … is not a principle. It describes the process, but provides no guidance as to when it can be used." In South Africa, "[t]he law is far from settled with regard to the circumstances in which it would be permissible to pierce the corporate veil". Similar confusion was also noted in US corporate law and in academic reviews. In conclusion he said the following.

83. It is only right to acknowledge that this limited doctrine may not, on analysis, be limited to piercing the corporate veil. However, there are three points to be made about that formulation. In so far as it is based on "fraud unravels everything", as discussed by Lord Sumption in para 18, the formulation simply involves the invocation of a well-established principle, which exists independently of the doctrine. In any event, the formulation is not, on analysis, a statement about piercing the corporate veil at all. Thus, it would presumably apply equally to a person who transfers assets to a spouse or civil partner, rather than to a company. Further, at least in some cases where it may be relied on, it could probably be analysed as being based on agency or trusteeship especially in the light of the words "under his control". However, if either or both those points were correct, it would not undermine Lord Sumption's characterisation of the doctrine: it would, if anything, serve to confirm the existence of the doctrine, albeit as an aspect of a more conventional principle. And if the formulation is intended to go wider than the application of "fraud unravels everything", it seems to me questionable whether it would be right for the court to take the course of arrogating to itself the right to step in and undo transactions, save where there is a well-established and principled ground for doing so. Such a course is, I would have thought, at least normally, a matter for the legislature....

Lady Hale gave a judgment concurring in the result, with which Lord Wilson agreed, though added a qualification to Lord Sumption's decision.

92. I am not sure whether it is possible to classify all of the cases in which the courts have been or should be prepared to disregard the separate legal personality of a company neatly into cases of either concealment or evasion. They may simply be examples of the principle that the individuals who operate limited companies should not be allowed to take unconscionable advantage of the people with whom they do business. But what the cases do have in common is that the separate legal personality is being disregarded in order to obtain a remedy against someone other than the company in respect of a liability which would otherwise be that of the company alone (if it existed at all). In the converse case, where it is sought to convert the personal liability of the owner or controller into a liability of the company, it is usually more appropriate to rely upon the concepts of agency and of the "directing mind". 93. What we have in this case is a desire to disregard the separate legal personality of the companies in order to impose upon the companies a liability which can only be that of the husband personally. This is not a liability under the general law, for example for breach of contract. It is a very specific statutory power to order one spouse to transfer property to which he is legally entitled to the other spouse. The argument is that that is a power which can, because the husband owns and controls these companies, be exercised against the companies themselves. I find it difficult to understand how that can be done unless the company is a mere nominee holding the property on trust for the husband, as we have found to be the case with the properties in issue here. I would be surprised if that were not often the case.

Lord Mance emphasised that future possible situations where the veil could be pierced should not be foreclosed.

Lord Clarke concurred. He agreed that Munby J in Ben Hashem v Al Shayif was correct that the veil could only be pierced where all other possibilities were exhausted. Also as he said in VTB Capital plc v Nutritek International Corp it is wrong to foreclose all future possibilities of piercing the veil.

Lord Walker said he welcomed "the full discussion in the judgments of Lord Neuberger, Lady Hale, Lord Mance and Lord Sumption" and concluded with the following.

106. ... for my part I consider that ‘piercing the corporate veil’ is not a doctrine at all... It is simply a label... to describe the disparate occasions on which some rule of law produces apparent exceptions to the principle of the separate juristic personality of a body corporate... These may result from a statutory provision, or from joint liability in tort, or from the law of unjust enrichment, or from principles of equity and the law of trusts...

== Significance ==
The significance of Prest was that it suggested that piercing the veil was usually a last resort, and that remedies outside of "piercing" the veil, particularly in equity, or the law of tort, could achieve appropriate results on the facts of each case. The metaphor of piercing was thought to be unhelpful by most of the judges in the Supreme Court.

== See also ==
- UK company law
- English family law
- Piercing the corporate veil
