= Barking cough =

A barking cough is a symptom name that may refer to:

- A harsh cough that sounds somewhat like a dog barking, as with croup
- The "Barking cough" is a symptom of asbestosis among the population of and around the former Cape Asbestos Company factory in Barking, east London
