= Clifford Perry =

New Zealand lawyer and judge

The Honourable Sir Clifford Perry

Judge of the Supreme Court
- In office 18 September 1962 – 10 July 1979

Personal details
- Born: Alan Clifford Perry; 10 July 1907 Oamaru, New Zealand
- Died: 1 May 1983 (aged 75) Auckland, New Zealand
- Spouse: Barbara Jean Head (m. 1943)
- Children: 3
- Education: Christ's College
- Alma mater: Canterbury University College
- Profession: Lawyer; judge
- Known for: Lee v Lee's Air Farming Ltd

Military service
- Allegiance: New Zealand
- Branch/service: Royal New Zealand Air Force
- Years of service: 1942–1946
- Rank: Flying officer
- Unit: Air Training Corps

Sir Alan Clifford Perry (10 July 1907 – 1 May 1983) was a New Zealand lawyer and judge. He served as a judge of the Supreme Court (now known as the High Court) from 1962 to 1979. However, he is perhaps best remembered for taking the case of Lee v Lee's Air Farming Ltd to the Privy Council in 1960, and successfully arguing for the unanimous decision of the Court of Appeal to be overturned.

== Early life and family ==
Born in Oamaru on 10 July 1907, Perry was the son of George and Agnes Perry. He was educated at Christ's College, Christchurch, and went on to study law at Canterbury University College, graduating Master of Laws with second-class honours in 1930.

During World War II, Perry served with the Royal New Zealand Air Force in the Air Training Corps (ATC). He was commissioned as a pilot officer in the ATC on 8 May 1942, and promoted to the rank of flying officer a year later. He relinquished his commission on 1 March 1946.

Perry married Barbara Jean Head at St Ninian's Church, Riccarton, on 24 December 1943, and the couple went on to have three children. Their son Brian became an architect based in London, specialising in retail shopping centres, and was a principal consultant for "The Shades" shopping centre in central Christchurch in 1977.

== Career ==
Perry started working at the Christchurch law firm of Wilding and Acland while he was a student. He became a partner in 1936 and the firm became Wilding Perry and Acland.

Perry practised across a range of areas, but was particularly interested in common law cases, and local-body and commercial law. He appeared as counsel before various commissions, including the Milk Commission (1943), the commission of inquiry into the 1947 Ballantyne's fire, the Licensing Commission (1948), and the Local Government Commission. In 1959, he chaired the inquiry into the fire on board the Holm & Co ship, MV Holmburn, in Lyttelton Harbour, and the following year was chair of the inquiry into the loss of the MV Holmglen and all 15 of her crew south-east of Timaru on 24 November 1959.

In 1960, Perry successfully appealed the Court of Appeal's unanimous decision in the case of Lee v Lee's Air Farming Ltd to the Privy Council in London. The case arose from the death of an aerial top-dressing pilot working for his own company. The pilot's wife was denied worker's compensation as the pilot was held also to be the employer, and the decision was upheld by the Court of Appeal. Perry went to the Privy Council, where, contrary to usual practice, he argued the case without assistance from an English barrister. The Privy Council overturned the Court of Appeal decision, and reaffirmed the principle of separate legal personality. Perry would later describe the case as the highlight of his legal career while in practice.

Perry was active in supporting the legal profession. He served as president of the Canterbury District Law Society in 1950, and was a member of the council of the New Zealand Law Society from 1950 to 1951. He was a member of the disciplinary committee of the New Zealand Law Society between 1952 and 1962, and also served as a member of the Council for Legal Education.

From 1942 to 1963, Perry served as the Danish consul in Christchurch, and he was appointed a Knight of the Order of the Dannebrog. He was also for a period a councillor of the Canterbury branch of the New Zealand Automobile Association.

Perry was appointed a judge of the New Zealand Supreme Court in 1962. At Perry's swearing-in at the Christchurch Supreme Court on 18 September, the president of the Canterbury District Law Society, R. P. Thompson, described Perry as "a courageous and learned advocate who had served the profession well". Perry was subsequently based in Auckland. He notably presided over the second trial of Arthur Allan Thomas for the murder of Harvey and Jeannette Crewe.

In 1977, Perry was awarded the Queen Elizabeth II Silver Jubilee Medal. In the 1976 Queen's Birthday Honours, he was appointed a Knight Bachelor, in recognition of his service as senior puisne judge of the Supreme Court. As senior puisne judge, Perry was ex officio acting chief justice when the chief justice was overseas. Perry retired from the bench on 10 July 1979, and was granted retention of the title The Honourable for life.

== Later life and death ==
Perry and his wife remained in Auckland in retirement, but also spent time at their cottage at Arthur's Pass. Perry died on 1 May 1983. His widow, Barbara, Lady Perry, died in Australia on 20 September 2008.
