= Trustor AB v Smallbone (No 2) =

Piercing the corporate veil in UK law

- Court: High Court (Chancery Division)
- Decided: 16 March 2001
- Citations: [2001] EWHC 703 (Ch), [2001] 2 BCLC 436, [2002] BCC 795, [2001] 1 WLR 1177

Trustor AB v Smallbone (No 2) [2001] EWHC 703 (Ch) is a UK company law case concerning piercing the corporate veil.

== Facts ==
Mr Smallbone had been the managing director of Trustor AB, and it was claimed that in breach of fiduciary duty he transferred money to a company that he owned and controlled. Trustor AB applied to treat receipt of the assets of that company as the same as the assets of Mr Smallbone. It argued that Smallbone's company was a sham to help breaches of duty, it had been involved in improper acts and the interests of justice demanded the result. The case against Mr Smallbone was eventually dropped by Trustor AB as there was no breach of fiduciary duty.

== Judgment ==
Sir Andrew Morritt VC held that there was enough evidence to lift the veil on the basis that it was a "mere facade". He noted the tension between Adams v Cape Industries plc and later cases and stated that impropriety is not enough to pierce the veil, but the court is entitled to do so where a company is used ‘as a device or façade to conceal the true facts and the liability of the responsible individuals.’

18. Liability arising from the knowing receipt of trust property stems from the speech of Lord Selborne in Barnes v Addy (1874) LR 9 Ch App 244, 251 that

"strangers are not to be made constructive trustees merely because they act as agents of trustees in transactions within their legal powers....unless these agents receive and become chargeable for part of the trust property, or unless they assist with knowledge in a dishonest and fraudulent design of the trustees."

In White & Tudor's Leading Cases in Equity 9th Ed. Vol 2 p.595 in relation to that passage from the speech of Lord Selborne the Editors quote with approval from the judgment of Kekewich J in Re Barney [1892] 2 Ch. 265, 273 that there is no liability "unless he has the trust property vested in him, or so far under his control that he can require it should be vested in him".

[...]

22. The second proposition also appears to me to be too widely stated unless used in conjunction with the first. Companies are often involved in improprieties. Indeed there was some suggestion to that effect in Salomon v A Salomon & Co Ltd [1897] AC 22. But it would make undue inroads into the principle of Salomon's case if an impropriety not linked to the use of the company structure to avoid or conceal liability for that impropriety was enough.

23. In my judgment the court is entitled to “pierce the corporate veil” and recognise the receipt of the company as that of the individual(s) in control of it if the company was used as a device or facade to conceal the true facts thereby avoiding or concealing any liability of those individual(s). On the facts of this case it is unnecessary to decide whether the dictum of Kekewich J in In re Barney [1892] 2 Ch 265, 273 referred to in paragraph 18, is applicable where the recipient is a wholly owned corporate body. The dictum suggests that complete control of the actual recipient may be enough. But this was not said in relation to a limited company and predates the decision of the House of Lords in Salomon v A Salomon & Co Ltd [1897] AC 22.

== See also ==
- UK company law
- Lifting the corporate veil
