= Gilford Motor Co Ltd v Horne =

1933 UK company law case

- Court: Court of Appeal of England and Wales
- Citation: [1933] Ch 935

Court membership
- Judges sitting: Lord Hanworth, MR Lawrence LJ and Romer LJ

Keywords
- Fraud, lifting the veil

Gilford Motor Co Ltd v Horne [1933] Ch 935 is a UK company law case concerning lifting the corporate veil. It gives an example of when courts will treat shareholders and a company as one, in a situation where a company is used as an instrument of fraud.

== Facts ==
Mr EB Horne was formerly a managing director of the Gilford Motor Co Ltd. His employment contract stipulated (clause 9) not to solicit customers of the company if he were to leave employment of Gilford Motor Co. Mr. Horne was fired, thereafter he set up his own business and undercut Gilford Motor Co's prices. He received legal advice saying that he was probably acting in breach of contract. So he set up a company, JM Horne & Co Ltd, in which his wife and a friend called Mr Howard were the sole shareholders and directors. They took over Horne’s business and continued it. Mr. Horne sent out fliers saying,

Spares and service for all models of Gilford vehicles. 170 Hornsey Lane, Highgate, N. 6. Opposite Crouch End Lane... No connection with any other firm.

The company had no such agreement with Gilford Motor about not competing, however Gilford Motor brought an action alleging that the company was used as an instrument of fraud to conceal Mr Horne's illegitimate actions.

== Judgment ==
=== High Court ===
Farwell J held that the covenant Mr Horne would not compete was broken. ‘I cannot help feeling quite convinced that at any rate one of the reasons for the creation of that company was the fear of Mr Horne that he might commit breaches of the covenant in carrying on the business…’ But because the covenant was too wide and against public policy, he refused to enforce it. Gilford Motor appealed.

=== Court of Appeal ===
Lord Hanworth MR granted an injunction, so that Horne was forced to stop competing through the company.

I am quite satisfied that this company was formed as a device, a stratagem, in order to mask the effect carrying on of a business of Mr EB Horne. The purpose of it was to enable him, under what is a cloak or sham, to engage in business which, on consideration of the agreement…

Lawrence LJ and Romer LJ concurred.

== See also ==
- Jones v Lipman
