= Chandler v Cape plc =

2012 Court of Appeal of England and Wales decision

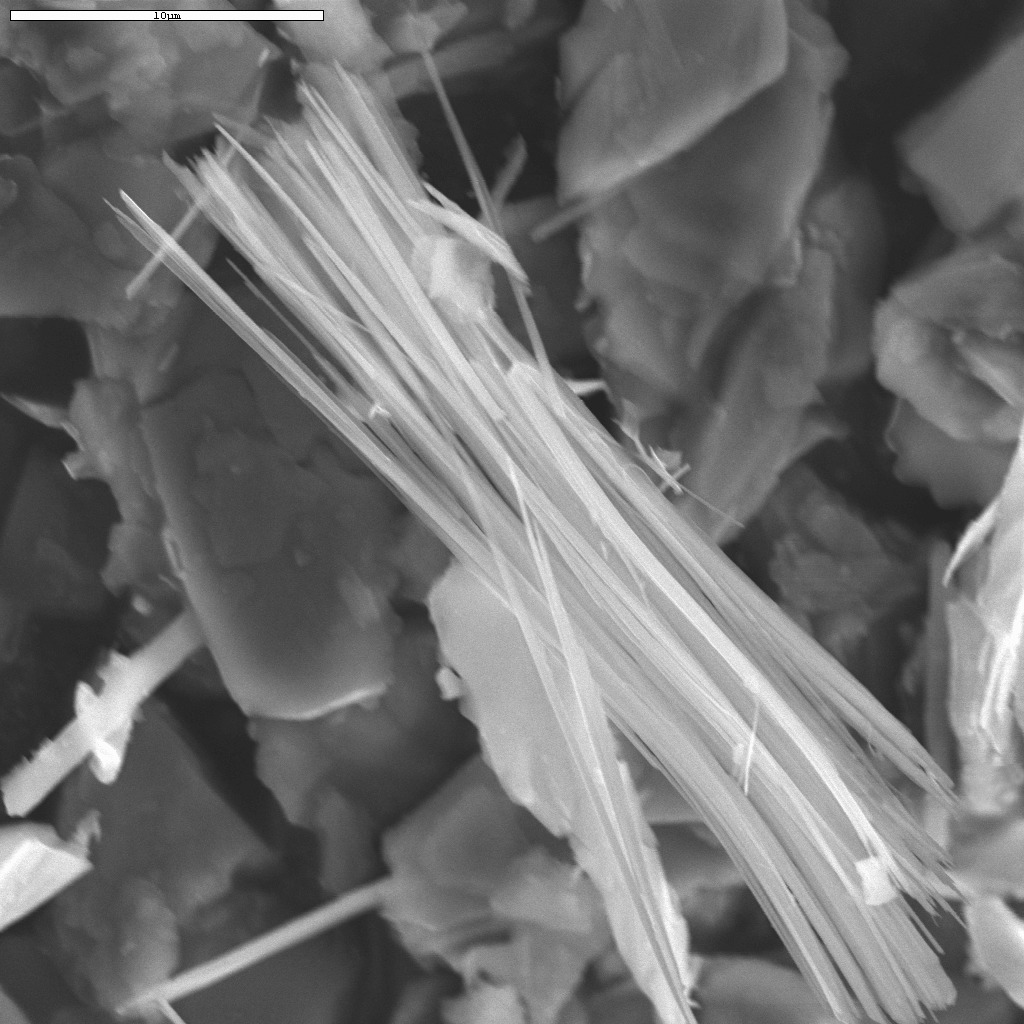
- Court: Court of Appeal of England and Wales
- Citations: [2011] EWHC 951 (QB); [2012] EWCA Civ 525

Case opinions
- Wyn Williams J (first instance); Arden LJ (Court of Appeal)

Keywords
- Tort victim, asbestos, duty of care, corporate veil, subsidiary

Chandler v Cape plc [2012] EWCA Civ 525 is a decision of the Court of Appeal which addresses the availability of damages for a tort victim from a parent company, in circumstances where the victim suffered industrial injury during employment by a subsidiary company.

== Facts ==
David Chandler had been employed by a wholly owned subsidiary company of Cape plc for just over 18 months, between 1959 and 1962. In 2007, Chandler discovered that as a result of exposure to asbestos during that period of employment, he had developed asbestosis. The subsidiary no longer existed and had no policy of insurance covering claims for damages for asbestosis. Chandler brought a claim against Cape plc, alleging it had owed (and breached) a duty of care to him. Cape plc denied that it owed a duty of care to the employees of its subsidiary company.

== Judgment ==
=== High Court ===
At first instance, Wyn Williams J held that Cape plc owed Mr Chandler a duty of care, applying the threefold test (foreseeability, proximity and fairness) laid down in Caparo Industries Plc v Dickman. Cape plc had had actual knowledge of the subsidiary employees' working conditions, and the asbestos risk was obvious. It had employed a scientific and medical officer to be responsible for health and safety issues and had, in the circumstances, retained responsibility for ensuring that its own employees, and those of its subsidiaries, were not harmed.

48 In the light of the contemporaneous and later documents discussed above there can be little doubt that the Defendant exercised control over some of the activities of Cape Products from the time that it came into existence and through the period during which the Claimant was one of its employees. With his usual realism, Mr Feeny does not seek to argue to the contrary. He submits, however, that although the Defendant was obviously entitled to exercise control over Cape Products and from time to time it did so, that does not mean that the Defendant controlled all its important activities. I accept that submission. A glance at the minutes of the meetings of the directors of Cape Products in the period 1956 to 1962 shows that many decisions about its activities, some of them important, were taken without reference to the Defendant.

49 It does not seem to me, however, that the Claimant's case stands or falls simply upon whether he can establish that the Defendant controlled all the activities of Cape Products. It is enough, in my judgment, if he can establish that the Defendant either controlled or took overall responsibility for the measures adopted by Cape Products to protect its employees against harm from asbestos exposure.

[...]

66. ... it is necessary to dispel certain possible misunderstandings which might arise in cases of this type or upon a cursory reading of this judgment. First, the fact that the Claimant was owed a duty of care by Cape Products does not prevent such a duty arising between the Claimant and other parties. No doubt, the fact that a duty situation exists between the Claimant and his employer is a factor to be taken into account when deciding whether another party owes the Claimant such a duty. But, to repeat, the existence of the duty between the Claimant and his employer cannot preclude another person being fixed with a duty of care. Second, the fact that Cape Products was a subsidiary of the Defendant or part of a group of companies of which the Defendant was the parent cannot mean by itself that the Defendant owes a duty to the employees of Cape Products. So much is clear from Adams v Cape Industries plc [1991] 1 AER 929. Equally, the fact that Cape Products was a separate legal entity from the Defendant cannot preclude the duty arising. Third, this case has not been presented on the basis that Cape Products was a sham – nothing more than a veil for the activities of the Defendant. Accordingly, this is not a case in which it would be appropriate to “pierce the corporate veil.”

71 It is true that generally the law imposes no duty upon a party to prevent a third party from causing damage to another. That emerges clearly from Smith v Littlewoods Organisation Ltd [1987] A.C. 241 . However, that same case makes it clear that there are exceptions to the general rule. In his speech Lord Goff identified the circumstances in which a duty might arise. They were a) where there was a special relationship between the Defendant and Claimant based on an assumption of responsibility by the Defendant; b) where there is a special relationship between the Defendant and the third party based on control by the Defendant; c) where the Defendant is responsible for a state of danger which may be exploited by a third party; and d) where the Defendant is responsible for property which may be used by a third party to cause damage. Mr Weir QC submits that if it is necessary to show that special or exceptional circumstances exist in the instant case that can be done. He submits that there was a special relationship between the Defendant and the Claimant based upon the Defendant's assumption of responsibility for safeguarding the Claimant against illness from exposure to asbestos; alternatively, the Defendant had the ultimate control of those measures which were taken to protect the Claimant from the risk of exposure to asbestos.

72 I end my discussion of the parties' submissions upon the law where I began. I must apply the three-stage test in Caparo....

75 The Defendant employed a scientific officer and a medical officer who were responsible, between them, for health and safety issues relating to all the employees within the group of companies of which the Defendant was parent. On the basis of the evidence as a whole it was the Defendant, not the individual subsidiary companies, which dictated policy in relation to health and safety issues insofar as the Defendant's core business impacted upon health and safety. The Defendant retained responsibility for ensuring that its own employees and those of its subsidiaries were not exposed to the risk of harm through exposure to asbestos. In reaching that conclusion I do not intend to imply that the subsidiaries, themselves, had no part to play – certainly in the implementation of relevant policy. However, the evidence persuades me that the Defendant retained overall responsibility. At any stage it could have intervened and Cape Products would have bowed to its intervention. On that basis, in my judgment, the Claimant has established a sufficient degree of proximity between the Defendant and himself. At paragraph 27 of the skeleton argument submitted on behalf of the Claimant the suggestion is made that in this case the degree of proximity between the Defendant and Claimant is central to the analysis of whether, on the facts, a duty of care was owed. I agree. The facts I have found proved in this case persuade me that proximity is established.

76 No argument was advanced to me by Mr Feeny that if foreseeability and proximity were established nonetheless it was not fair, just and reasonable for a duty to exist. Had such an argument been advanced I would have rejected it. By the late 1950s it was clear to the Defendant that exposure to asbestos brought with it very significant risk of very damaging and life threatening illness. I can think of no basis upon which it would be proper to conclude in those circumstances that it would not be just or reasonable to impose a duty of care upon an organisation like the Defendant.

77 In my judgment the three-stage test for the imposition of a duty of care is satisfied in this case. Accordingly, the Claimant succeeds in his claim.

=== Court of Appeal ===
Cape plc appealed to the Court of Appeal, but its appeal was dismissed. Arden LJ (with whom the other judges agreed) concluded that Cape plc had assumed responsibility to Mr Chandler and was answerable for the injury which he had suffered.

1. ... On 14 April 2011, Wyn Williams J held that Cape was liable to Mr Chandler on the basis not of any form of vicarious liability or agency or enterprise liability, but on the basis of the common law concept of assumption of responsibility. Cape appeals against that decision.

[...]

8. Cape acquired at least a majority of the share capital of Cape Products in 1945, and the outstanding shares in about 1953. Cape installed the necessary plant into the empty factory. A manager was appointed "to manage this plant as a branch of Cape" (see The Cape Asbestos Story produced by Cape Asbestos, 1953, page 71). Production of Asbestolux, a new form of non-combustible asbestos board, started. "In a short time, [Cape Products] was an invaluable feature in Cape's economy" (op. cit. page 72). However, it is noteworthy that at no relevant point in time did Cape cease to be an operating company itself or merely hold the shares in its subsidiaries as if it were an investment holding company.

[...]

40. Although it appears that there is no reported case of a direct duty of care on the part of a parent company, Mr Weir cites the passage from the speech of Lord Bingham in Lubbe v Cape Plc [2000] 1 WLR 1545. That case concerned the question whether proceedings, which had been brought by former employees of a former South African subsidiary of Cape in England and Wales, should be stayed on the grounds that the proper forum was South Africa. The House did not therefore have to consider the basis of which such an action might succeed. However, at page 1555 Lord Bingham expressly contemplated that it might involve as in this case a detailed examination of the relationship between the parties based on the surviving documentary material....

[...]

62. The basis on which the judge found there was a duty of care on the part of Cape is on the basis of an assumption of responsibility. This falls within the second and third parts of the three-part Caparo test for determining whether there is a duty of care, namely proximity and the further requirement that it be fair, just and reasonable to impose liability. These two requirements are directed to the essentially same question. As Lord Oliver pointed out in Caparo:

"'Proximity' is, no doubt a convenient expression so long as it is realised that it is no more than a label which embraces not a definable concept but merely a description of circumstances in which, pragmatically, the courts conclude that a duty of care exists." (page 633)

63. The development of the law of negligence has to be incremental and the judge was in my judgment correct to hold that the analogous line of cases in negligence to the instant case is the line of authority on the duty of a person to intervene to prevent damage to another. As Lord Goff pointed out in Smith v Littlewoods Ltd [1987] AC 241 at 270, there is in general no duty to prevent third parties causing damage to another. But Lord Goff recognised that there were exceptions to this principle, for example where there was "a relationship between the parties which gives rise to an imposition or assumption of responsibility" on the part of the defendant (page 272D).

64. Lord Goff speaks of the imposition or assumption of responsibility. Whether a party has assumed responsibility is a question of law. The court does not have to find that the relevant party has voluntarily assumed responsibility (see also on this point Customs and Excise Commissioners v Barclays Bank [2007] 1 AC 181, cited by Mr Weir). The word "assumption" is therefore something of a misnomer. The phrase "attachment" of responsibility might be more accurate.

65. Responsibility was imposed in Dorset Yacht Co Ltd v Home Office [1970] AC 1004, where the Home Office was held liable for damage done by escaping Borstal boys over whom the Home Office had had control. Its control over them gave rise to a special relationship in law between the plaintiffs and the Home Office. An assumption of a duty of care has also been found to exist as between an independent contractor and employees of the employer: see, for example, Gray v Fire Alarm Fabrication Services Ltd [2007] ICR 247; Clay v AJ Crump Ltd [1964] 1 QB 533.

66. Likewise, it has been held on two occasions that it is arguable that a parent company may owe a duty of care to employees of subsidiaries: see Connelly v Rio Tino Zinc Corporation and Ngcobo v Thor Chemicals Holdings Ltd, January 1996, per Maurice Kay J, unreported. There is nothing in either judgment or the general law to support the submission advanced by Mr Stuart-Smith that the duty of care can only exist in these cases if the parent company has absolute control of the subsidiary. Moreover, if a parent company has responsibility towards the employees of a subsidiary there may not be an exact correlation between the responsibilities of the two companies. The parent company is not likely to accept responsibility towards its subsidiary's employees in all respects but only for example in relation to what might be called high level advice or strategy.

[...]

69. I would emphatically reject any suggestion that this court is in any way concerned with what is usually referred to as piercing the corporate veil. A subsidiary and its company are separate entities. There is no imposition or assumption of responsibility by reason only that a company is the parent company of another company.

70. The question is simply whether what the parent company did amounted to taking on a direct duty to the subsidiary's employees.

[...]

78. Given Cape's state of knowledge about the Cowley Works, and its superior knowledge about the nature and management of asbestos risks, I have no doubt that in this case it is appropriate to find that Cape assumed a duty of care either to advise Cape Products on what steps it had to take in the light of knowledge then available to provide those employees with a safe system of work or to ensure that those steps were taken. The scope of the duty can be defined in either way. Whichever way it is formulated, the injury to Mr Chandler was the result. As the judge held, working on past performance and viewing the matter realistically, Cape could, and did on other matters, give Cape Products instructions as to how it was to operate with which, so far as we know, it duly complied.

79. In these circumstances, there was, in my judgment, a direct duty of care owed by Cape to the employees of Cape Products. There was an omission to advise on precautionary measures even though it was doing research and that research had not established (nor could it establish) that the asbestosis and related diseases were not caused by asbestos dust. Moreover, while I have reached my conclusion in my own words and following my own route, it turns out that, in all essential respects, my reasoning follows the analysis of the judge in paragraphs 61 and 72 to 75 of his judgment.

80. In summary, this case demonstrates that in appropriate circumstances the law may impose on a parent company responsibility for the health and safety of its subsidiary's employees. Those circumstances include a situation where, as in the present case, (1) the businesses of the parent and subsidiary are in a relevant respect the same; (2) the parent has, or ought to have, superior knowledge on some relevant aspect of health and safety in the particular industry; (3) the subsidiary's system of work is unsafe as the parent company knew, or ought to have known; and (4) the parent knew or ought to have foreseen that the subsidiary or its employees would rely on its using that superior knowledge for the employees' protection. For the purposes of (4) it is not necessary to show that the parent is in the practice of intervening in the health and safety policies of the subsidiary. The court will look at the relationship between the companies more widely. The court may find that element (4) is established where the evidence shows that the parent has a practice of intervening in the trading operations of the subsidiary, for example production and funding issues.

== Significance ==
The decision is significant because it represents the first time that an injured employee of a subsidiary company has established that his employer's parent company owed him a duty of care. Arden LJ dismissed any suggestion that the case involved piercing the corporate veil, but the outcome has an equivalent effect in that (through the application of tortious principles) it imposes liability upon a parent company despite the fact that the parent company is a legal entity separate from that of its subsidiary.

== Application of the judgement in South Africa ==
The reasoning contained in the judgement is consistent with the common law delictual principles that have application in South Africa and likely in other common law jurisdictions. While no similar ruling has yet been made in a South African court, the decision will be relied upon by the plaintiffs in a class action brought on behalf of several tens of thousands of former Southern African gold mine workers, who have contracted silicosis as a result of work in the mines, against South African gold mine owners and their parent companies.(Bongani Nkala and others v Harmony Gold Mining Company and Others, Case No 48226/12, South Gauteng High Court)<goldminersilicosis.co.za>

The most significant parent company defendant is Anglo American South Africa Limited, which has now divested itself of all its gold mining assets but, for several decades, owned and controlled gold mine owning subsidiaries responsible for about 40% of South Africa's gold production. As most of its former gold mine owning subsidiaries have been wound up and deregistered, the decision in Chandler v Cape plc offers avenue for recovery to thousands of former mine workers who might otherwise have no realistic prospect of recovering compensation for their losses.

== See also ==
- Corporate veil in the United Kingdom
