= Lee v Lee's Air Farming Ltd =

New Zealand company law case

Lee v Lee’s Air Farming Ltd
- Court: Judicial Committee of the Privy Council
- Full case name: Catherine Lee v Lee's Air Farming Limited
- Decided: 11 October 1960
- Citation: [1960] UKPC 33, [1961] AC 12, [1960] 3 All ER 420, [1960] 3 WLR 758, 104 Sol Jo 869
- Transcript: Privy Council ruling

Case history
- Appealed from: [1959] NZLR 383

Court membership
- Judges sitting: Viscount Simonds, Lord Reid, Lord Tucker, Lord Denning, Lord Morris of Borth-y-Gest

Case opinions
- Decision by: Lord Morris of Borth-y-Gest

Keywords
- Separate legal personality

Lee v Lee's Air Farming Ltd [1960] UKPC 33 is a company law case from New Zealand, also important for UK company law and Indian Companies Act 2013, concerning the corporate veil and separate legal personality. The Judicial Committee of the Privy Council reasserted that a company is a separate legal entity, so that a director could still be under a contract of employment with the company he solely owned.

== Facts ==
Catherine Lee's husband Geoffrey Lee formed the company through Christchurch accountants, which worked in Canterbury, New Zealand. It spread fertilisers on farmland from the air, known as top dressing. Mr Lee held 2999 of 3000 shares, was the sole director and employed as the chief pilot. He was killed in a plane crash. Mrs Lee wished to claim damages of 2,430 pounds under the Workers' Compensation Act 1922 for the death of her husband, and he needed to be a 'worker', or 'any person who has entered into or works under a contract of service... with an employer... whether remunerated by wages, salary or otherwise.' The company was insured (as required) for worker compensation.

The Court of Appeal of New Zealand said Lee could not be a worker when he was in effect also the employer. North J said "the two offices are clearly incompatible. There would exist no power of control and therefore the relationship of master-servant was not created."

== Advice ==
The Privy Council advised that Mrs Lee was entitled to compensation, since it was perfectly possible for Mr Lee to have a contract with the company he owned. The company was a separate legal person. Lord Morris of Borth-y-Gest said:

It was never suggested (nor in their Lordships' view could it reasonably have been suggested) that the company was a sham or a mere simulacrum. It is well established that the mere fact that someone is a director of a company is no impediment to his entering into a contract to serve the company. If, then, it be accepted that the respondent company was a legal entity their Lordships see no reason to challenge the validity of any contractual obligations which were created between the company and the deceased...

It is said that the deceased could not both be under the duty of giving orders and also be under the duty of obeying them. But this approach does not give effect to the circumstance that it would be the company and not the deceased that would be giving the orders. Control would remain with the company whoever might be the agent of the company to exercise...

There appears to be no great difficulty in holding that a man acting in one capacity can make a contract with himself in another capacity. The company and the deceased were separate legal entities.

== See also ==
- Salomon v. A. Salomon & Co. Ltd.
- DHN Food Distributors Ltd. v. Tower Hamlets London Borough Council
- Adams v. Cape Industries plc
