= 1976 Birthday Honours (New Zealand) =

Awards list for New Zealand

The 1976 Queen's Birthday Honours in New Zealand, celebrating the official birthday of Elizabeth II, were appointments made by the Queen on the advice of the New Zealand government to various orders and honours to reward and highlight good works by New Zealanders. They were announced on 12 June 1976.

The recipients of honours are displayed here as they were styled before their new honour.

== Knight Bachelor ==
- James George Barnes MBE JP – of Dunedin; mayor of the City of Dunedin since 1968.
- The Honourable Mr Justice Alan Clifford Perry – of Auckland; senior puisne judge of the Supreme Court.
- Bryan James Todd – of Wellington. For services to commerce and the community.
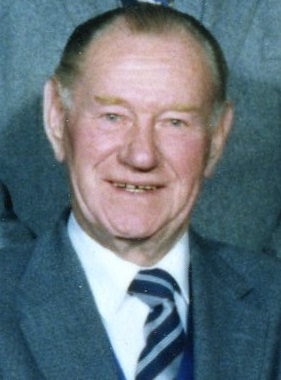
Sir James Barnes

== Order of the Bath ==
=== Companion (CB) ===
Military division

- Major-General Robin Hugh Ferguson Holloway CBE – Chief of General Staff.

== Order of Saint Michael and Saint George ==
=== Companion (CMG) ===
- The Honourable Mr Justice Alan Aylmer Coates – of Auckland. For public services and services as a stipendiary magistrate.
- Jean Marjory Herbison – of Christchurch. For services to education.

== Order of the British Empire ==
=== Knight Commander (KBE) ===
Civil division

- Brigadier Herbert Ellery Gilbert DSO OBE – of Silverstream; Director of Security since 1957.
- Gordon Edward George Minhinnick OBE – of Auckland. For services as a cartoonist.
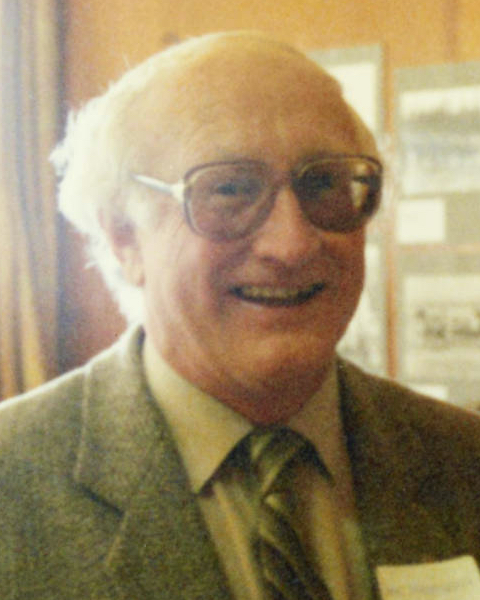
Sir Gordon Minhinnick

=== Commander (CBE) ===
Civil division

- Arthur Newman Vickery Dobbs – of Lower Hutt; Director-General of Education, 1971–1975.
- John Malcolm Fielder OBE VRD – of Lower Hutt; Public Trustee, 1968–1976.
- Brigadier James Ferris Fuller OBE ED – of Wellington. For services to dentistry.
- The Very Reverend Walter Edmund Wilmshurst Hurst – of Wellington. For services to the community.
- Whakaari Te Rangitakuku Metekingi – of Marton. For services to the Māori people, especially in the rehabilitation of Māori lands.
- Emeritus Professor Charles Nalden – of Auckland. For services to music.
- Alfred Walmsley OBE – of Invercargill. For services to the community.

Military division

- Brigadier Alan Howard Sutton – Assistant Chief of Defence Staff (Personnel).

=== Officer (OBE) ===
Civil division

- Bridget Teresa Bryant – of Manakau. For services to the community, especially Women's Division of Federated Farmers.
- Thomas Anthony Carrol – of Dargaville. For services to the farming industry.
- Maurice Rhodes Carter JP – of Christchurch. For services to local-body and community affairs.
- Norris Arthur Collins – of Paekākāriki. For services as general secretary, National Union of Railwaymen.
- Professor Ian Edward Coop – of Canterbury; vice principal and professor of animal science, Lincoln College, University College of Agriculture.
- The Very Reverend George David Falloon MC – of Geraldine. For services to the Presbyterian Church and community.
- The Reverend Canon Henry Ivor Hopkins – of Christchurch. For services to prison chaplaincy.
- Captain Frederick Patrick Ladd MBE – of Rotorua. For services to the tourist and aviation industries.
- Catherine Alice McCormack (The Reverend Mother Melchior) – of Heretaunga. For services to nursing.
- Captain Peterson Neil McKellar – of Whangārei. For services as superintendent, Northland Harbour Board.
- Noel Clifford Manson – of Wellington; major, Salvation Army. For services to the community.
- Oliver Ross Nicholson – of Auckland. For services to medicine, especially orthopaedics.
- Hinetara Potaka – of Te Puke. For services to the Māori people, especially in the field of education and welfare.
- Joseph Victor Hugh Stephens – of Balclutha. For services to farming and the community.
- Hugh Kenneth Stevenson – of Napier. For services to the city of Napier and province of Hawkes Bay.
- Charles Joseph Tustin – of Lower Hutt. For services to the New Zealand Returned Services Association.
- Thomas Harold Warburton – of Greytown. For services to commercial horticulture.

Military division

- Captain Eric Robinson Ellison – Royal New Zealand Navy.
- Colonel Edward John Valentine ED – Colonels' List (Territorial Force).
- Group Captain Patrick Neville AFC – Royal New Zealand Air Force.
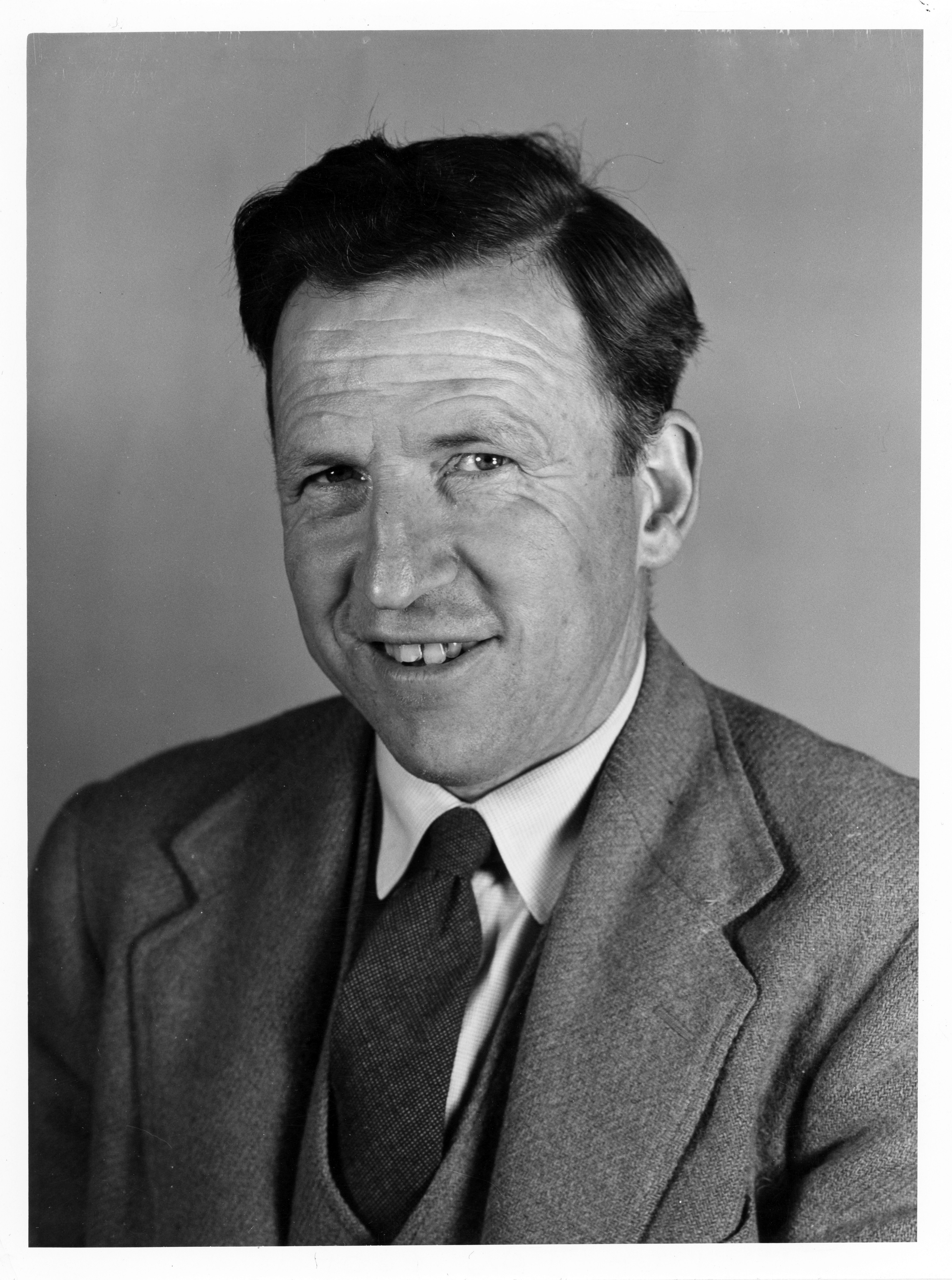
Ian Coop

=== Member (MBE) ===
Civil division

- George Ramsay Andrews MC DCM JP – of Te Aroha. For services to community and local-body affairs.
- Ian Douglas Blair – of Christchurch. For services to science and the community.
- Valdemars Briedis – of Christchurch. For services to athletics as a coach.
- Leslie Alexander Byars JP – of Taumarunui. For services to local government and sport.
- James Douglas Charlton Edgar – of Dunedin. For services to art.
- Ida Gertrude Eise – of Auckland. For services to art.
- Doris Fitzsimmons – of Wellington. For services to sport.
- Ronald William Arthur Frost – of Auckland. For services to motor racing.
- Gladys Mary Gebbie – of Whangaparāoa. For services to youth, especially the Girls' Brigade.
- Muriel Ernesta Hilton JP – of Waimate. For services to local-body and community affairs.
- Helen Julia Vivian Jensen – of Auckland. For services to women's hockey.
- Annie Cameron Keenan – of Dunedin. For services to bowling.
- Douglas Haig Meiklejohn – of Wellington. For services to the Wellington Boys' Institute.
- Hugh Allen Mills JP – of Rotorua. For services to the community.
- William Parker – of Wellington. For services to the Māori people.
- William Baker Parker JP – of Blenheim. For service to the community, especially as a member of the Marlborough Harbour Board.
- Eric Paton – of Auckland. For services to the community.
- Alan Ernest Pow – of Auckland. For services to the performing arts.
- Robina Annie Reardon – of Auckland. For services to music.
- Mary Bertha Rawlinson (Mrs Falconer) – of Dunedin. For services to music and drama.
- Rona Miriel Stevenson JP – of Taupō. For services to the community.
- Edward John Trappitt – chief superintendent, New Zealand Police.
- Squadron Leader Denton Norman Tyler – New Zealand Cadet Forces, Air Training Corps, Wanganui.
- Mervyn James Waters – of Christchurch. For services to brass bands.
- Alfred James Noble Whelan – of Auckland. For services to softball.
- Phyllis Margaret Zeff – of Christchurch. For services to family life and the community.

Military division

- Lieutenant Commander Harold Charles Gibson Richards – Royal New Zealand Navy.
- Warrant Officer Second Class William McPherson Dyas – Royal New Zealand Engineers (Territorial Force).
- Temporary Major and Quartermaster Trevor Frederick Phillips – Royal New Zealand Infantry Regiment.
- Warrant Officer First Class Donald St Clare Stewart – Royal New Zealand Infantry Regiment.
- Captain Kenneth John Woods – Royal New Zealand Engineers.
- Flight Lieutenant Miles Lancaster Pointon – Royal New Zealand ″Air Force.
- Squadron Leader Noel James Work – Royal New Zealand Air Force.
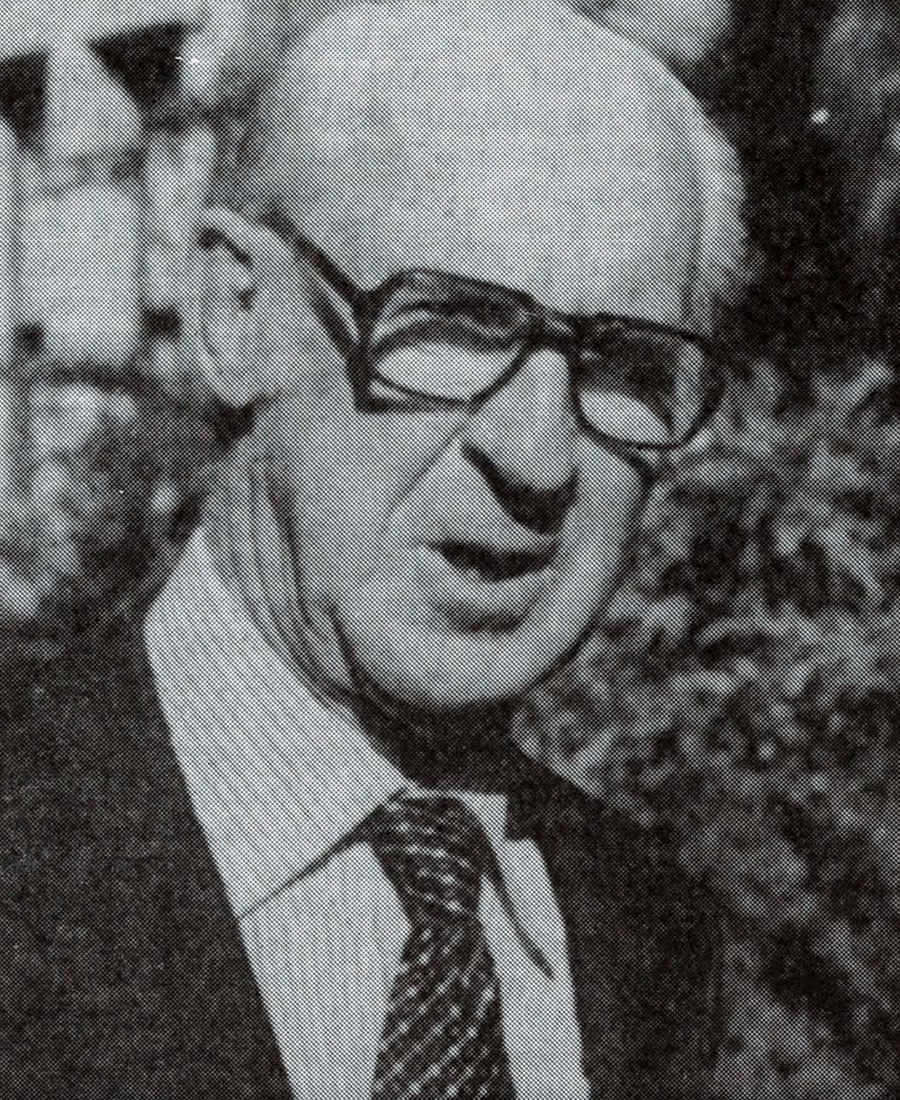
Ian Blair

== British Empire Medal (BEM) ==
Civil division

- William James Bolitho – of Reefton. For services to the coal-mining industry.
- Hector Jack Clark – of Auckland. For services to horticulture and the community.
- Leslie Nelson Cording – of Wellington. For services to the disabled.
- Constance Emily Free – of Hāwera. For services to the Hawera Hospital and community.
- John Hector Gordon – deceased, of Invercargill. For services to the community.
- Harry Ernest Mitchell Hart – of Christchurch. For services to afforestation.
- Nohowaka Uri Karaka – of Auckland. For services to the trade-union movement.
- Seymour Charles Arundell Lambert – of Auckland. For services to the blind.
- Isabella Lees Roberts – of Rotorua. For services to the community.

Military division

- Chief Petty Officer Keith Norman Duley – Royal New Zealand Navy.
- Sergeant Graeme Alexander Harvey – Royal New Zealand Army Medical Corps (Territorial Force).
- Staff Sergeant James Hewson Hendrick – Royal New Zealand Engineers.
- Warrant Officer Trevor Frank Mulligan – Royal New Zealand Air Force.

== Companion of the Queen's Service Order (QSO) ==
=== For community service ===
- Marjory Charles Cambridge – of Karoro.
- Janet Hassall – of Tokoroa.
- Leonard Ivan Plimmer JP – of Palmerston North.

=== For public service ===
- Kenneth Haslett – of Whangārei.
- Oliver James Henderson – of Invercargill.
- Henry Montague Israel JP – of Auckland.
- Ailsa Douglas McCutchan – of Mount Maunganui; lately matron-in-chief, Waikato Hospital Board.
- Douglas Crichton McKechnie – of Geraldine.
- The Honourable Henry Leonard James May – of Waikanae; Member of Parliament, 1954–1975; Minister of the Crown, 1972–1975.
- Barry Percy Frederick Rothery – of Auckland.
- Hilton Stevens Wells JP – of Wellington; principal private secretary to the Prime Minister.
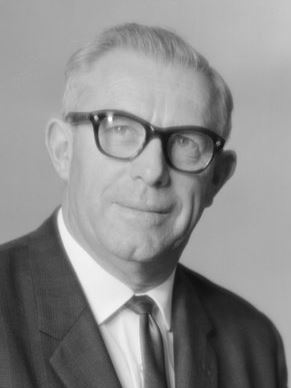
Henry May

== Queen's Service Medal (QSM) ==
=== For community service ===
- Myrtle Elizabeth Aymes – of Te Kūiti.
- Denis Lowther Evelyn Broad – of Carters Beach.
- Dorris Loft Bryant – of Hāwera.
- Lily Kate Victoria Grigg JP – of Wellington.
- Amelia Ida Haas – of Pahiatua.
- Richard Albert Himona JP – of Masterton.
- Evelyn Francoise Le Lievre (Sister Mary Fidelis) – of Hastings.
- William Patrick Mathewson – of Hastings.
- Colleen Catherine Neal – of Blenheim.
- Jessie Dundas Scott – of Alexandra.
- Mervyn David Sterling – of Matakohe.
- Rosalie Sterritt – of Christchurch.
- Mary Margaret Taylor – of Auckland.
- Kyra Veronica Todd – of New Plymouth.

=== For public services ===
- George Albert Ammundsen – of Wanganui.
- John Douglas Bayne JP – of Te Kūiti.
- John Kinder Clark JP – of Milton.
- Dorothy Ivy Croucher – of Dagenham, Essex, England; lately, private secretary to High Commissioner, New Zealand High Commission, London.
- Dr Garsie Aris De Latour – of Te Puia Springs; lately medical superintendent, Waiapu Hospital.
- Harold Lindsay Edwards – senior sergeant, New Zealand Police.
- William Esgar Hale JP – of Foxton; director and secretary, New Zealand Woolpack and Textiles Limited.
- Colin Vivian Kerr-Taylor JP – of Waimauku.
- Eric Charles Kingston JP – of Waipawa.
- Daisy Winifred Pillar – of Levin.
- Edward Charlie Puddick – lately director, Department of Social Welfare, Auckland.
- Mary Elizabeth Richardson JP – of Auckland.
- Mary Patricia Von Dadelszen – of Pōrangahau.
- Ronald Edgar Williams JP – of Rotorua; overseer (buildings), Waipa Sawmill, New Zealand Forest Service.

== Queen's Fire Service Medal (QFSM) ==
- Athol Eric Cattermole – chief fire officer, Kaiapoi Volunteer Fire Brigade.
- Robert Mervyn Craig – fireman, Pukekohe Volunteer Fire Brigade.

== Queen's Police Medal (QPM) ==
- David James Dwan – lately detective senior sergeant, New Zealand Police.
- James William Lester – constable, New Zealand Police.

== Air Force Cross (AFC) ==
- Squadron Leader Ian Samuel Ritchie – Royal New Zealand Air Force.

== Queen's Commendation for Valuable Service in the Air ==
- Squadron Leader Roger Selwyn Holdaway – Royal New Zealand Air Force.
