= Christopher Farwell =

English lawyer and High Court judge

Sir Christopher John Wickens Farwell (26 December 1877 – 15 April 1943) was an English lawyer and High Court judge.

== Biography ==
Christopher Farwell was son of Sir George Farwell, sometime a Lord Justice of Appeal, and Mary Erskine, née Wickens, daughter of Vice-Chancellor Sir John Wickens. He was educated at Winchester College, but did not proceed to university. He was called to the Bar by Lincoln's Inn in 1902, three years after his father was appointed to the High Court. He was appointed a King's Counsel in 1923, and became a bencher of Lincoln's Inn in 1928, in succession to Lord Haldane. He built a Chancery practice, described as sound but not outstanding.

Farwell was appointed to the High Court of Justice in 1929, receiving the customary knighthood. He was assigned to the Chancery Division, following in the steps of his father and grandfather. He died in service in 1943. At his death, he was the senior Chancery judge. His last years on the bench were blighted by bad health.

He was elected chairman of the Council of Legal Education, succeeding to Lord Justice Greer (later Lord Fairfield). He was the editor of the third edition of his father's treatise, Farwell on Powers.

In 1904, he married Leslie Hope, elder daughter of Dr T. C. Hope, of Geelong, Australia.

== Notable cases ==
- Sagar v Ridehalgh & Sons Ltd [1931] 1 Ch 310
- Gilford Motor Co Ltd v Horne [1933] Ch 935

== Sources ==
- The Times, 17 April 1943
