= Bertha Rawlinson =

New Zealand singer, actor, composer (1910–1994)

Mary Bertha Rawlinson MBE (1 June 1910 – 25 January 1994) was a New Zealand singer, actress, drama producer, composer and music teacher. She was born in Geraldine, New Zealand, in 1910.

In the 1976 Queen's Birthday Honours, she was appointed a Member of the Order of the British Empire, for services to music and drama.
