= Sagar v Ridehalgh & Sons Ltd =

British legal case

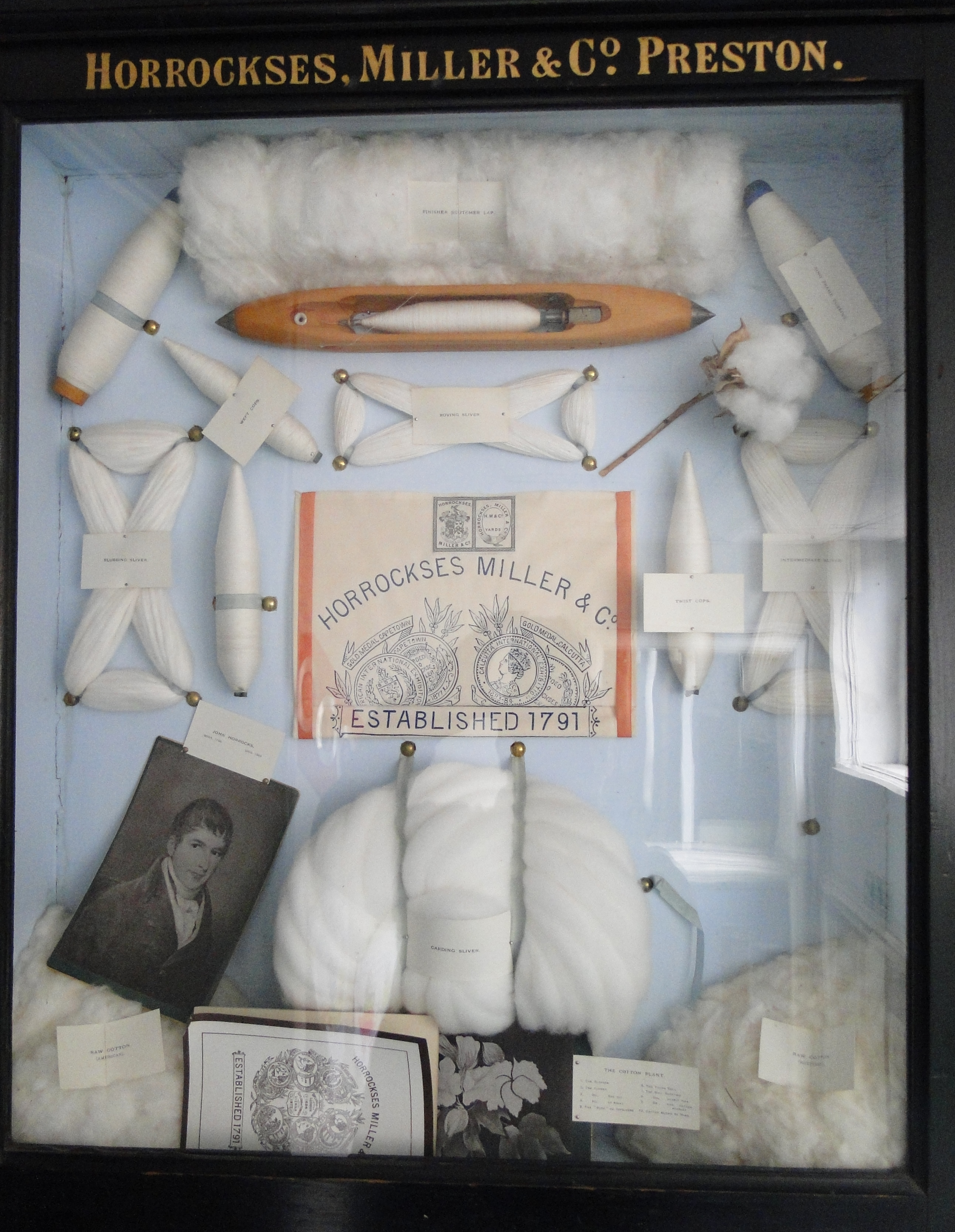
- Court: Court of Appeal
- Citation: [1931] 1 Ch 310

Keywords
- Employment contract

Sagar v Ridehalgh & Sons Ltd [1931] 1 Ch 310 is a UK labour law case concerning the contract of employment. It concerns the implication of terms, regarding deductions from wages, through the custom of an industry.

== Facts ==
Mr Sagar was a cotton weaver for Ridehalgh & Sons Ltd in Nelson, Lancashire. He claimed that pay had been wrongfully deducted from his wages allegedly for poor workmanship. His contract was oral, but pay was fixed by collective agreement with the Amalgamated Weavers' Association and the Cotton Spinners' and Manufacturers' Association. According to the collective agreement he should have been paid 2l. 5s. 0½d. But Ridehalgh Ltd only paid him 2l. 4s. 0½d., deducting 1s. in respect of a fault in 3 yards of the 80 yards piece. Mr Sagar had failed to piece up a broken thread of the warp. This made 3 yards of cloth unmerchantable. Mr Sagar said this was an unlawful deduction contrary to Truck Act 1831 section 3. But Ridehalgh Ltd argued mills in the locality had the custom of deducting for work that had been performed without reasonable care and skill in the management’s eyes. That had been so for thirty years at the workplace, though nobody had said anything in the oral agreement and no provisions concerning deductions were found in the collective agreement.

Farwell J said that Mr Sagar was entitled to be fully paid unless the employer used its right to terminate the contract.

== Judgment ==
Lord Hanworth MR held the deduction was still lawful. It was a clear custom of the industry, not destroyed by the fact, once established, that many people dislike it, or contract out of it altogether.

Farwell J., who tried the case, held that the deduction was not justified; that the practice above stated was not universal, nor reasonable or certain, and that the deduction was illegal under s. 3 of the Truck Act, 1831. From this judgment the defendants appeal.

[...]

There is abundant evidence to justify the finding of Farwell J. that the plaintiff was guilty of carelessness in his work, that he failed to comply with the standard of proper skill which he agreed it was his duty to exercise - indeed, he admitted his carelessness. Further, he agreed that the prices in the list and on the card issued to him were prices for work carefully done. It seems that there was on one occasion a strike or lock-out at a mill at Nelson arising out of a deduction made from wages. The plaintiff admitted he knew of it, that the strike came to an end, and that the system of deductions remained and was assented to. There was cogent evidence that the system of deductions in the estimation of the work to be paid for had been in operation at the defendants' mill for a long stretch of time and had been exercised from time to time at the discretion of the defendants, and their manager. Farwell J. found a difficulty in believing that the plaintiff did not become aware that there was such a system in vogue at the defendants' mill, and I share it. The Uniform List of Prices provides a scale of increased payment where special care has to be taken by the weaver, as in the case of what is known as "pickfinding," and provision is also made for an allowance in favour of the workman where inferior materials are provided for his weaving by the employer.

[...]

... the workman on his part must suffer a deduction if he has not done the good work which the prices were intended to match. The plaintiff's evidence shows clearly that the basis of his employment was for good work, and in my judgment it was an integral term of it that he should not receive the full scale except for good work, not that bad work gave rise only to a right to dismiss the workman or sue him for damages. In other words, the contract between him and his employer was that in measuring the value of his work and the payment to be made to him, the quality of work not less than the quality of the materials supplied, and the nature of the work to be done, whether of an ordinary type or a superior class such as pickfinding, was to be taken into account. It matters not that these deductions were not always enforced. They may have been used for a disciplinary purpose, to enforce a standard of work by the weavers. They may have thus come to be known among the weavers as fines. If the contract provided that the work should be measured according to its quality, the principle laid down in Basten v. Butter applies. Nor can Mondel v. Steel be dismissed as a case dealing *with procedure only. The procedure by way of defence was allowed, because the right to cut down the plaintiff's claim to its real value was established. Holding that the contract between the parties was of the terms that I have indicated, it is unnecessary to consider the practice at other mills or in any larger area. The contract was, in my judgment, one to which, following Chawner v. Cummings, the prohibition of the Truck Act does not apply.

Lawrence LJ and Romer LJ concurred.

== See also ==
- UK labour law
- Employment contract in English law
- Autoclenz Ltd v Belcher [2011] UKSC 41
