= Re Darby, ex p Brougham =

Re Darby, ex parte Brougham
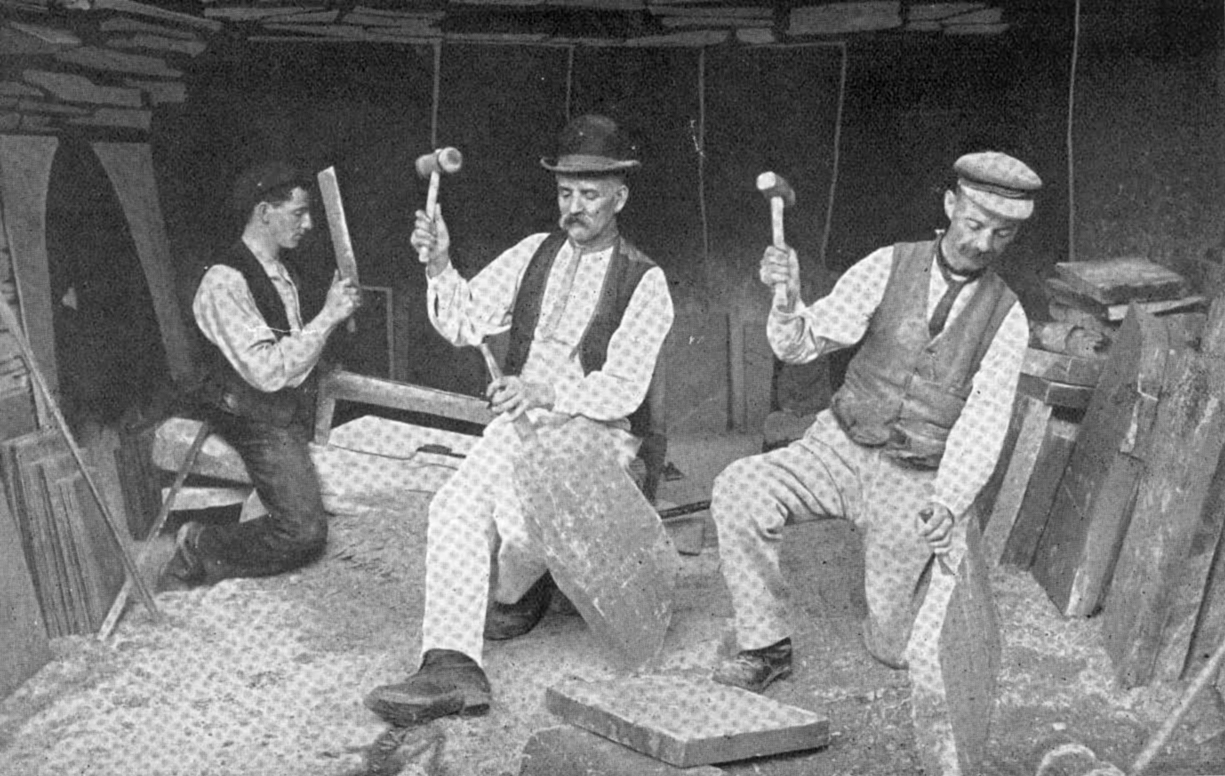
- Court: High Court
- Citation: [1911] 1 KB 95

Court membership
- Judge sitting: Phillimore J

Keywords
- Fraud, lifting the veil

Re Darby, ex parte Brougham [1911] 1 KB 95 is a UK company law case concerning piercing the corporate veil. It is a clear example of the courts ignoring the veil of incorporation where a company is used to conceal a fraudulent operation.

== Facts ==
Darby and Gyde were undischarged bankrupts with convictions for fraud. They registered a company called City of London Investment Corporation Ltd (LIC) in Guernsey. It had seven shareholders and issued £11 of its nominal capital of £100,000. Darby and Gyde were the only directors and entitled to all profits. The company purported to register and float a company in England called Welsh Slate Quarries Ltd, for £30,000. It bought a quarrying licence and plant for £3500 and sold this to WSQ for £18,000. The prospectus invited the public to take debentures in WSQ. It stated the name of LIC, but not Darby and Gyde, or the fact that they would receive the profit on sale. WSQ failed and went into liquidation. The liquidator claimed Darby's secret profit, which he made as a promoter. Darby objected that the LIC and not him was the promoter.

== Judgment ==
Phillimore J rejected the argument. LIC ‘was merely an alias for themselves just as much as if they had announced in the Gazette that they were in future going to call themselves ‘Rothschild & Co’. They were ‘minded to perpetrate a very great fraud’.

== Significance ==
Courts can issue a freezing order (previously a Mareva injunction) against the assets of someone likely to have a judgment against him if there is risk that liability will not be met. The Criminal Justice Act 1988 section 77, prevents a person dealing with assets which are liable to be confiscated as the proceeds of crime. Such an order can extend to cover assets not owned by the person, but a company controlled by him.

== See also ==
- UK company law
