= Connelly v RTZ Corp plc =

UK conflicts of laws case

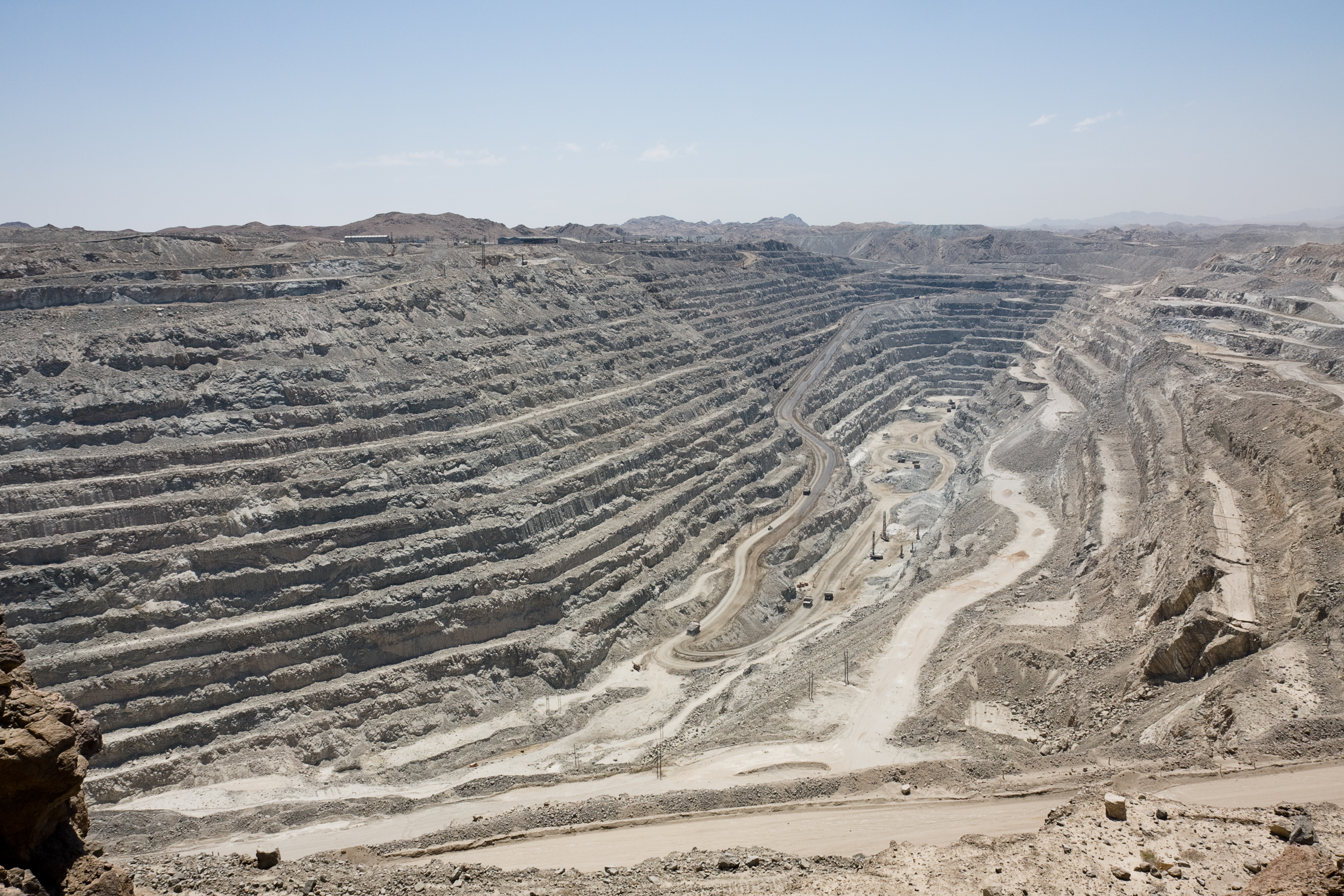
- Court: House of Lords
- Decided: 24 July 1997
- Citations: [1997] UKHL 30 [1997] 4 All ER 335 [1997] 3 WLR 373, [1998] AC 854 [1999] CLC 533
- Transcript: BAILII

Court membership
- Judges sitting: Lord Goff of Chieveley; Lord Lloyd of Berwick; Lord Hoffmann; Lord Hope of Craighead; Lord Clyde

Case opinions
- Decision by: Lord Goff of Chieveley
- Concurrence: Lord Lloyd of Berwick, Lord Hope of Craighead, Lord Clyde
- Dissent: Lord Hoffmann

Keywords
- Corporate veil, conflicts of laws

Connelly v RTZ Corporation plc [1997] UKHL 30, [1999] CLC 533 is a conflicts of laws case, important for UK company law and English tort law, concerning the claim of a worker in Namibia attempting to sue an employer headquartered in the United Kingdom for breach of the duty of care to ensure proper health and safety in the workplace.

== Facts ==
Mr Connelly mined uranium in Namibia for RTZ’s wholly owned subsidiary, Rossing Uranium Ltd. He developed cancer, squamous-cell carcinoma of the larynx, from uranium ore dust and sued RTZ, alleging that it played a role in setting its subsidiary’s health and safety procedures, and therefore owed him a duty of care. RTZ argued Mr Connelly should sue the subsidiary only and was limited to an action in Namibia. This case was determined in the House of Lords in favour of Mr Connelly.

Following his win in the House of Lords, Mr Connelly pursued RTZ in the English High Court. This time, RTZ contended that it owed no duty of care at all, and in addition the action was time barred under the Limitation Act 1980 sections 11 and 14. Also, it was Namibian law that applied under the Foreign Limitation Periods Act 1984, s 1.

== Judgment ==
=== House of Lords ===
House of Lords found the matter could not be heard in Namibia, given the complexity and cost of the case, so London was the appropriate forum.

Lord Hoffmann dissented. ‘If the presence of the defendants, as parent company and local subsidiary of a multinational, can enable them to be sued here, any multinational with its parent company in England will be liable to be sued here in respect of its activities anywhere in the world.

=== High Court ===
Wright J dismissed the striking out application, but allowed the limitation point. It was arguable that RTZ had a duty of care, but Mr Connelly could have brought the case in 1989 and chose not to. Therefore, Mr Connelly's claim failed because he had not brought the action within the statutory time limits.

As a matter of strict language this may well be true; but that is not to say that in appropriate circumstances there may not be some other person or persons who owe a duty of care to an individual plaintiff which may be very close to the duty owed by a master to his servant. For example, the consultant who advises the employer upon the safety of his work processes may owe a duty to the individual employee who he can foresee may be affected by the contents of that advice – see, for example, Clay v Crump & Sons Ltd [1964] 1 QB 533. Even more clearly, if the situation is that an employer has entirely handed over responsibility for devising, installing and operating the various safety precautions required of an employer to an independent contractor, then that contractor may owe a duty to the individual employee which is virtually coterminous with that of the employer himself. That is not to say that the employer, by so handing over such responsibility, will necessarily escape his own liability to his employee. On a fair reading of his pleading, it seems to me that that is more or less what the amended Statement of Claim alleges – namely, that the first Defendant had taken into its own hands the responsibility for devising an appropriate policy for health and safety to be operated at the Rossing mine, and that either the first Defendant or one or other of its English subsidiaries implemented that policy and supervised the precautions necessary to ensure as so far as was reasonably possible, the health and safety of the Rossing employees through the RTZ supervisors. Such an allegation, if true, seems to me to impose a duty of care on those Defendants who undertook those responsibilities, whatever contribution Rossing itself may have made towards the safety procedures at the mine. The situation would be an unusual one; but if the pleading represents the actuality then, as it seems to me, the situation is likely to comprehend the elements of proximity, foreseeability and reasonableness required to give rise to a duty of care:

== See also ==
- Conflicts of laws
