= Cape plc =

British energy services company

- Industry: Energy services
- Founded: 1893
- Headquarters: West Drayton, Middlesex
- Key people: Timothy Eggar (Chairman); Joe Oatley (CEO)
- Products: Access, Insulation, Coatings, Passive Fire Protection, Refractory Linings, Environmental Services, Oil and Gas Storage Tanks and Heat Exchanger Replacement and Refurbishment
- Revenue: £697.1 million (2013)
- Operating income: £41 million (2013)
- Net income: £23.5 million (2013)
- Number of employees: 18,000 (2014)
- Website: www.capeplc.com

Cape plc is a British energy services company based in West Drayton, Middlesex. It was acquired by Altrad in September 2017.

== History ==
The company was founded in 1893 as the Cape Asbestos Company with the objective of mining asbestos in the Orange Free State and importing it into European countries where it could be woven into fire-resistant materials. By 1913 it had four factories in the London area including a facility in Barking and in 1939 it opened a manufacturing facility at Acre Mill near Hebden Bridge to meet the demand for gas mask filters made from blue asbestos during the Second World War. In 1976 it established a scaffolding division and in the late 1970s it developed asbestos-free products such that by 1980 it had become the world's foremost supplier of asbestos-free protection and insulation board. Although it had a full listing during the 1980s it was at that time 67.3% owned by Charter Consolidated plc.

In 1990, the company was involved in an important UK company law case, Adams v Cape Industries plc, concerning separate legal personality and limited liability of shareholders for asbestos related injuries. A subsequent related case in 2012, Chandler v Cape plc, also involved the company.

It transferred from a full listing to the Alternative Investment Market in 2002 in a bid to cut costs and it reached a settlement in 2003 to pay £7.5 million to 7,500 claimants from South Africa who had been seeking compensation over many years for asbestos-related health problems. In 2006 it established a £40 million fund for claimants based in the UK.

In 2006 it bought DBI, an industrial cleaning specialist based in the UK, and in 2007 it acquired PCH, a scaffolding and hoist company based in Australia. In June 2011 it was transferred back to a full listing from the Alternative Investment Market and was restructured in such a way that it was ultimately Jersey-registered.

The company was acquired by Altrad for £332 million in September 2017.

In 2023, MPs and asbestos victim campaigners in the UK called on Cape to provide a £10m donation towards mesothelioma research. This is due to documents released after a long running court battle showing Cape "provided misleading reassurance about the dangers of asbestos". Labour MP Ian Lavery, chair of the all-party parliamentary group (APPG) on occupational safety and health, and the group’s other members, said: "Knowing the links between the products made by your company, the role of Cape in knowingly putting more people in danger, and the devastating consequences, we appeal to your company to make this donation. Mesothelioma is always terminal, and Britain has the highest rates of anywhere in the world."

== Operations ==
Cape provides "non-mechanical" multi-disciplined integrated support services covering such disciplines as access, scaffolding, insulation, coatings, passive fire protection, refractory linings, environmental services, oil and gas storage tanks and heat exchanger replacement and refurbishment, project management and other essential services to major industrial clients in the energy sector.
