= Smith v Littlewoods Organisation Ltd =

English law case

- Court: House of Lords
- Full case name: Maloco and Smith v Littlewoods Organisation Ltd
- Citations: [1987] UKHL 18, [1987] 2 WLR 480

Court membership
- Judges sitting: Lord Emslie, Lord Grieve, Lord Brand, Lord Keith, Lord Brandon, Lord Griffith, Lord Mackay and Lord Goff

Keywords
- Third parties, omissions, duty of care

Smith v Littlewoods Organisation Ltd [1987] UKHL 18 was a House of Lords decision on duty of care in the tort of negligence. It was specifically concerning the potential liability for the wrongdoing of third parties.

== Facts ==
Littlewoods Organisation Ltd purchased a cinema in 1976, intending to demolish it and turning it into a supermarket. After some initial work in June it was left unattended. Sometimes vandals and children broke in, and on one occasion vandals set fire to some old film, and the cinema itself. On 5 July 1976, vandals started a larger fire and the cinema burnt down, damaging a few adjacent buildings including a neighbouring cafe, billiard saloon and church. The neighbours claimed damages and brought an action against Littlewoods for negligence on the basis that they failed to take reasonable care of the cinema by having it regularly inspected or locking and guarding the premises.

The instant court held the fire was reasonably foreseeable. Littlewoods appealed, arguing they had no knowledge of previous attempts to start the fires. The First Division of the Inner House of the Court of Session allowed Littlewoods' appeal, and the matter was appealed again to the House of Lords.

== Judgment ==
The House of Lords dismissed the appeals, and held that since there was nothing inherently dangerous about an empty cinema, i.e. it was not a source of risk. The only thing that could possibly have prevented a fire would be a 24-hour guard on the premises and that would be an intolerable burden to impose on the owners in this case. Mere foreseeability of damage was not sufficient basis to find liability.

== Significance ==
The law does not recognise a general duty of care to prevent others from suffering loss or damage caused by the deliberate wrongdoing of third parties. The rationale behind this is that the common law does not impose liability for what are called pure omissions. A closer relationship between defendant and the wrongdoer is required to establish such a duty. See e.g. Home Office v Dorset Yacht Co, where borstal officers were held liable for damage caused to the plaintiffs by borstal boys who were under their control.

== See also ==
- English tort law
