= Salomon v A Salomon & Co Ltd =

UK landmark company law case

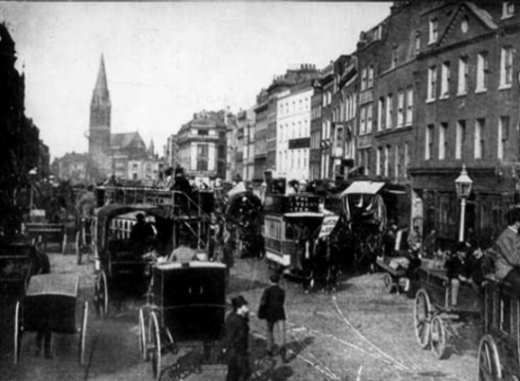
- Whitechapel High Street
- Court: House of Lords
- Decided: 16 November 1897
- Citations: [1896] UKHL 1 [1897] AC 22

Case history
- Prior action: Broderip v Salomon [1895] 2 Ch. 323

Case opinions
- Lord Macnaghten, Lord Halsbury and Lord Herschell

Keywords
- Corporation, separate legal personality, agency

Salomon v A Salomon & Co Ltd [1896] UKHL 1, [1897] AC 22 is a landmark UK company law case. The effect of the House of Lords' unanimous ruling was to uphold firmly the doctrine of corporate personality, as set out in the Companies Act 1862, so that creditors of an insolvent company could not sue the company's shareholders for payment of outstanding debts.

== Facts ==
Mr. Aron Salomon made leather boots or shoes as a sole proprietor. His sons wanted to become business partners, so he turned the business into a limited liability company. This company purchased Salomon's business at an excessive price for its value. His wife and five elder children became subscribers and the two sons became directors. Mr Salomon took 20,001 of the company's 20,007 shares which were payments from A Salomon & Co Limited for his old business (each share was valued at £1). The transfer of the industry took place on 1 June 1892. The company also issued to Mr Salomon £10,000 in debentures. On the security of his debentures, Mr. Salomon received an advance of £5,000 from Edmund Broderip.

Soon after Mr. Salomon incorporated his business, boot sales declined. The company failed, defaulting on its interest payments on its debentures (half held by Broderip). Broderip sued to enforce his security. The company was put into liquidation. Broderip was repaid his £5,000. This left £1,055 in company assets remaining, of which Salomon claimed under the retained debentures he retained. If Salomon's claim was successful this would leave nothing for the unsecured creditors. When the company failed, the company's liquidator contended that the floating charge should not be honoured, and Salomon should be made responsible for the company's debts. Salomon sued.

== Issues ==
The liquidator, on behalf of the company, counter-claimed wanting the amounts paid to Salomon paid back, and his debentures cancelled. He argued that Salomon had breached his fiduciary duty to the new company he was promoting by selling his business for an excessive price. He also argued that the whole formation of the company in this way was intended as a fraud against its unsecured creditors in the future.

== Judgment ==
=== Trial court ===
At first instance, Vaughan Williams J. ruled in the case entitled Broderip v Salomon that Mr Broderip's claim was valid. It was undisputed that the 200 shares were fully paid up. He said the company had a right of indemnity against Mr Salomon. He said the signatories of the memorandum of incorporation were mere "dummies" and that the company was just Mr Salomon in another form, an alias or at least, his agent. Therefore, it was entitled to indemnity from the principal. The liquidator amended the counterclaim, and an award was made for indemnity. The agency argument was accepted.

=== Court of Appeal ===
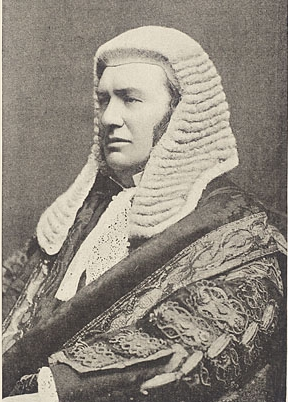
Lindley LJ was the leading expert on partnerships and company law.

The Court of Appeal confirmed Vaughan Williams J's decision against Mr Salomon, though because Mr Salomon had abused the privileges of incorporating a limited liability company, which Parliament had intended only to confer on "independent not counterfeit shareholders, who had a mind and will of their own and were not mere puppets". Lindley LJ (an expert on partnership law) held that the company was a trustee for Mr Salomon and, as such, Salomon was bound to indemnify the company's debts.

The incorporation of the company cannot be disputed (see s. 18 of the Companies Act 1862). Whether by any proceeding like a scire facias the Court could set aside the certificate of incorporation is a question which has never been considered, and on which I express no opinion, but, be that as it may, in such an action as this the validity of the certificate cannot be impeached. The company must, therefore, be regarded as a corporation, but a corporation created for an illegitimate purpose. Moreover, there have always been seven members, although six of them hold only one £1 share each, Mr Aron Salomon cannot be reached under s. 48, to which I have already alluded. As the company must be recognised as a corporation, I feel difficulty in saying that the company did not carry on business as a principal and that the debts and liabilities contracted in its name are not enforceable against it in its corporate capacity. But it does not follow that the order made by Vaughan Williams J. is wrong. A person may carry on business as a principal and incur debts and liabilities as such, and yet be entitled to be indemnified against those debts and liabilities by the person for whose benefit he carries on the business. The company in this case has been regarded by Vaughan Williams J. as the agent of Aron Salomon. I should rather liken the company to a trustee for him - a trustee improperly brought into existence by him to enable him to do what the statute prohibits. It is manifest that the other members of the company have practically no interest in it, and their names have merely been used by Mr Aron Salomon to enable him to form a company and to use its name to screen himself from liability. This view of the case is quite consistent with In re George Newman & Co. In a strictly legal sense the business may have to be regarded as the business of the company; but if any jury were asked, Whose business was it? they would say Aron Salomon's, and they would be right if they meant that the beneficial interest in the business was his. I do not go so far as to say that the creditors of the company could sue him. In my opinion, they can only reach him through the company. Moreover, Mr Aron Salomon's liability to indemnify the company, in this case, is, in my view, the legal consequence of the formation of the company to attain a result not permitted by law. The liability does not arise simply from the fact that he holds nearly all the shares in the company. A man may do that and yet be under no such liability as Mr Aron Salomon has come under. His liability rests on the purpose for which he formed the company, on the way he formed it, and on the use which he made of it. There are many small companies which will be quite unaffected by this decision. But there may be some which, like this, are mere devices to enable a man to carry on trade with limited liability, to incur debts in the name of a registered company, and to sweep off the company's assets using debentures which he has caused to be issued to himself to defeat the claims of those who have been incautious enough to trade with the company without perceiving the trap which he has laid for them.

It is idle to say that persons dealing with companies are protected by s. 43 of the Companies Act, 1862, which requires mortgages of limited companies to be registered, and entitles creditors to inspect the register. It is only when a creditor begins to fear he may not be paid that he thinks of looking at the register, and until a person is a creditor he has no right of inspection. Persons do not ask to see mortgage registers before they deal with limited companies, and this is perfectly well known to everyone acquainted with the actual working of the Companies Acts and the habits of businessmen. Mr. Aron Salomon and his advisers, who were very shrewd people, were fully alive to this circumstance. If the legislature thinks it right to extend the principle of limited liability to sole traders it will no doubt do so, with such safeguards, if any, as it may think necessary. But until the law is changed such attempts as these ought to be defeated whenever they are brought to light They do infinite mischief; they bring into disrepute one of the most useful statutes of modern times, by perverting its legitimate use, and by making it an instrument for cheating honest creditors.

Mr. Aron Salomon's scheme is a device to defraud creditors.

Lopes LJ and Kay LJ variously described the company as a myth and a fiction and said that the incorporation of the business by Mr Salomon had been a mere scheme to enable him to carry on as before but with his liability for debt limited.

=== House of Lords ===
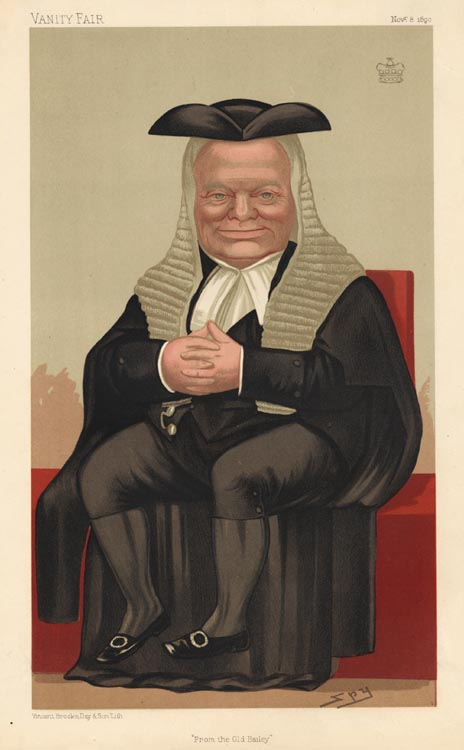
Lord Halsbury LC, a conservative peer and author of Halsbury's Laws took a strict literalist approach to legislative interpretation.

The House of Lords unanimously overturned this decision, rejecting the arguments of the agency. They held that there was nothing in the act about whether the subscribers (i.e., the shareholders) should be independent of the majority shareholder. The company was duly constituted in law and it was not the function of judges to read into the statute limitations they considered expedient. Lord Halsbury LC stated that the statute "enacts nothing as to the extent or degree of interest which may be held by each of the seven [shareholders] or as to the proportion of interest or influence possessed by one or the majority over the others." His judgment continued.

I have no right to add to the requirements of the statute, nor to take from the requirements thus enacted. The sole guide must be the statute itself ...

Either the limited company was a legal entity or it was not. If it was, the business belonged to it and not to Mr. Salomon, who is often referred to as Salomon. If it was not, there was no person and no thing to be an agent at all; and it is impossible to say at the same time that there is a company and there is not.

Lindley LJ on the other hand, affirms that there were seven members of the company; but he says it is manifest that six of them were members simply in order to enable the seventh himself to carry on business with limited liability. The object of the whole arrangement is to do the very thing which the Legislature intended not to be done.

It is obvious to inquire where is that intention of the Legislature manifested in the statute. Even if we were at liberty to insert words to manifest that intention, I should have great difficulty in ascertaining what the exact intention thus imputed to the Legislature is, or was. In this particular case it is the members of one family that represent all the shares; but if the supposed intention is not limited to so narrow a proposition as this, that the seven shareholders must not be members of one family, to what extent may influence or authority or intentional purchase of a majority among the shareholders be carried so as to bring it within the supposed prohibition? It is, of course, easy to say that it was contrary to the intention of the Legislature – a proposition which, by reason of its generality, it is difficult to bring to the test; but when one seeks to put as an affirmative proposition what the thing is which the Legislature has prohibited, there is, as it appears to me, an insuperable difficulty in the way of those who seek to insert by construction such a prohibition into the statute.

Lord Herschell noted the potentially "far reaching" implications of the Court of Appeal's logic and that in recent years many companies had been set up in which one or more of the seven shareholders were "disinterested persons" who did not wield any influence over the management of the company. Anyone dealing with such a company was aware of its nature as such, and could by consulting the register of shareholders become aware of the breakdown of share ownership among the shareholders.

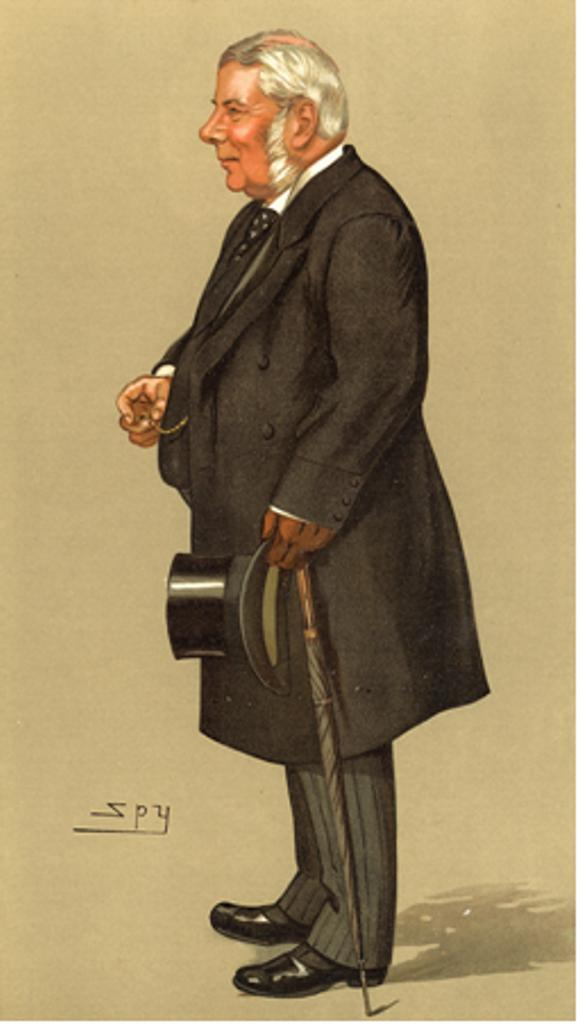
Lord Macnaghten.

Lord Macnaghten asked what was wrong with Mr. Salomon taking advantage of the provisions set out in the statute, as he was perfectly legitimately entitled to do. It was not the function of judges to read limitations into a statute on the basis of their own personal view that, if the laws of the land allowed such a thing, they were "in a most lamentable state", as Malins V-C had stated in an earlier case in point, In Re Baglan Hall Colliery Co., which had likewise been overturned by the House of Lords. The key parts of his judgement were as follows.

When the memorandum is duly signed and registered, though there be only seven shares taken, the subscribers are a body corporate "capable forthwith", to use the words of the enactment, "of exercising all the functions of an incorporated company". Those are strong words. The company attains maturity on its birth. There is no period of minority – no interval of incapacity. I cannot understand how a body corporate thus made "capable" by statute can lose its individuality by issuing the bulk of its capital to one person, whether he be a subscriber to the memorandum or not. The company is at law a different person altogether from the subscribers to the memorandum; and, though it may be that after incorporation the business is precisely the same as it was before, and the same persons are managers, and the same hands receive the profits, the company is not in law the agent of the subscribers or trustee for them. Nor are the subscribers as members liable, in any shape or form, except to the extent and in the manner provided by the Act. That is, I think, the declared intention of the enactment. If the view of the learned judge were sound, it would follow that no common law partnership could register as a company limited by shares without remaining subject to unlimited liability ...

... Among the principal reasons which induce persons to form private companies, as is stated very clearly by Mr. Palmer in his treatise on the subject, are the desire to avoid the risk of bankruptcy, and the increased facility afforded for borrowing money. By means of a private company, as Mr. Palmer observes, a trade can be carried on with limited liability, and without exposing the persons interested in it in the event of failure to the harsh provisions of the bankruptcy law. A company, too, can raise money on debentures, which an ordinary trader cannot do. Any member of a company, acting in good faith, is as much entitled to take and hold the company's debentures as any outside creditor. Every creditor is entitled to get and to hold the best security the law allows him to take.

If, however, the declaration of the Court of Appeal means that Mr. Salomon acted fraudulently or dishonestly, I must say I can find nothing in the evidence to support such an imputation. The purpose for which Mr. Salomon and the other subscribers to the memorandum were associated was "lawful". The fact that Mr. Salomon raised £5,000 for the company on debentures that belonged to him seems to me strong evidence of his good faith and of his confidence in the company. The unsecured creditors of A. Salomon and Company, Limited, may be entitled to sympathy, but they have only themselves to blame for their misfortunes. They trusted the company, I suppose, because they had long dealt with Mr. Salomon, and he had always paid his way; but they had full notice that they were no longer dealing with an individual, and they must be taken to have been cognisant of the memorandum and of the articles of association. For such a catastrophe as has occurred in this case some would blame the law that allows the creation of a floating charge. But a floating charge is too convenient a form of security to be lightly abolished. I have long thought, and I believe some of your Lordships also think, that the ordinary trade creditors of a trading company ought to have a preferential claim on the assets in liquidation in respect of debts incurred within a certain limited time before the winding-up. But that is not the law at present. Everybody knows that when there is a winding-up debenture-holders generally step in and sweep off everything; and a great scandal it is.

It has become the fashion to call companies of this class "one man companies". That is a taking nickname, but it does not help one much in the way of argument. If it is intended to convey the meaning that a company which is under the absolute control of one person is not a company legally incorporated, although the requirements of the Act of 1862 may have been complied with, it is inaccurate and misleading: if it merely means that there is a predominant partner possessing an overwhelming influence and entitled practically to the whole of the profits, there is nothing in that that I can see contrary to the true intention of the Act of 1862, or against public policy, or detrimental to the interests of creditors. If the shares are fully paid up, it cannot matter whether they are in the hands of one or many. If the shares are not fully paid, it is as easy to gauge the solvency of an individual as to estimate the financial ability of a crowd. One argument was addressed to your Lordships which ought perhaps to be noticed, although it was not the ground of decision in either of the Courts below. It was argued that the agreement for the transfer of the business to the company ought to be set aside, because there was no independent board of directors, and the property was transferred at an overvalue. There are, it seems to me, two answers to that argument. In the first place, the directors did just what they were authorized to do by the memorandum of association. There was no fraud or misrepresentation, and there was nobody deceived. In the second place, the company have put it out of their power to restore the property which was transferred to them. It was said that the assets were sold by an order made in the presence of Mr. Salomon, though not with his consent, which declared that the sale was to be without prejudice to the rights claimed by the company by their counter-claim. I cannot see what difference that makes. The reservation in the order seems to me to be simply nugatory.

== Significance ==
Salomon's case still represents the orthodox view of separate legal personality under English law, although a number of exceptions have since evolved. In Williams & Humbert v W & H Trade Marks [1986] AC 368 at 429B Lord Templeman described as "heretical" the suggestion that this principle should be ignored. In E.B.M. Co Limited v Dominion Bank [1937] 3 All ER 555 at 564 Lord Russell of Killowen stated the principle was one of "supreme importance". In Adams v Cape Industries plc [1990] Ch 433 Slade LJ said "the court is not free to disregard the principle of Salomon v A Salomon & Co Ltd [1897] AC 22 merely because it considers that justice so requires. Our law, for better or worse, recognises the creation of subsidiary companies, which though in one sense the creatures of their parent companies, will nevertheless under the general law fall to be treated as separate legal entities with all the rights and liabilities which would normally attach to separate legal entities." In Prest v Petrodel Resources Ltd [2013] UKSC 34, [2013] 2 AC 415 at paragraph 66 Lord Neuberger called Salomon: "a clear and principled decision, which has stood unimpeached for over a century".

In the decades since Salomon's case, various exceptional circumstances have been delineated, both by legislatures and the judiciary, in England and elsewhere (including Ireland) when courts can legitimately disregard a company's separate legal personality, such as where crime or fraud has been committed. There is therefore much debate as to whether the same decision would be reached if the same facts were considered in the modern legal environment, given the House of Lords' decisions in Pepper v Hart and Re Spectrum Plus Ltd and the Privy Council in Attorney General of Belize v Belize Telecom Ltd. In 2013 there was a systemic review of these authorities in Prest v Petrodel Resources Ltd and Lord Sumption distinguished between cases of truly "piercing the corporate veil" and situations where it was held that the company was essentially an agent for a wrongdoer or held property on trust.

Although Salomon's case is cited in court to this day, it has met with considerable criticism. For example, Otto Kahn-Freund called the decision "calamitous" in his article published at [1944] 7 MLR 54. In that article, the author also called for the abolition of private companies.

== Reform ==
Shortly after the decision was handed down the Preferential Payments in Bankruptcy Amendment Act 1897 was passed into law as a response. The effect of that statute was to provide that certain classes of preferred creditors would take priority over the claims of a secured creditor under a floating charge. However, the effectiveness of that act was limited by the fact that a floating charge crystallises into a fixed charge prior to enforcement, and so it was not until the Insolvency Act 1986 modified the provision to state that a floating charge include any charge which was created as a floating charge (i.e. irrespective of subsequent crystallisation) that priority of the preferred creditors was promoted ahead of the floating chargeholders.

== See also ==
- Corporate law
- Berkey v. Third Avenue Railway 244 N.Y. 602, 155 N.E. 914 (1927) a leading case on separate personhood in US corporate law
- Lee v Lee’s Air Farming Ltd
