= Adams v Cape Industries plc =

UK company law case

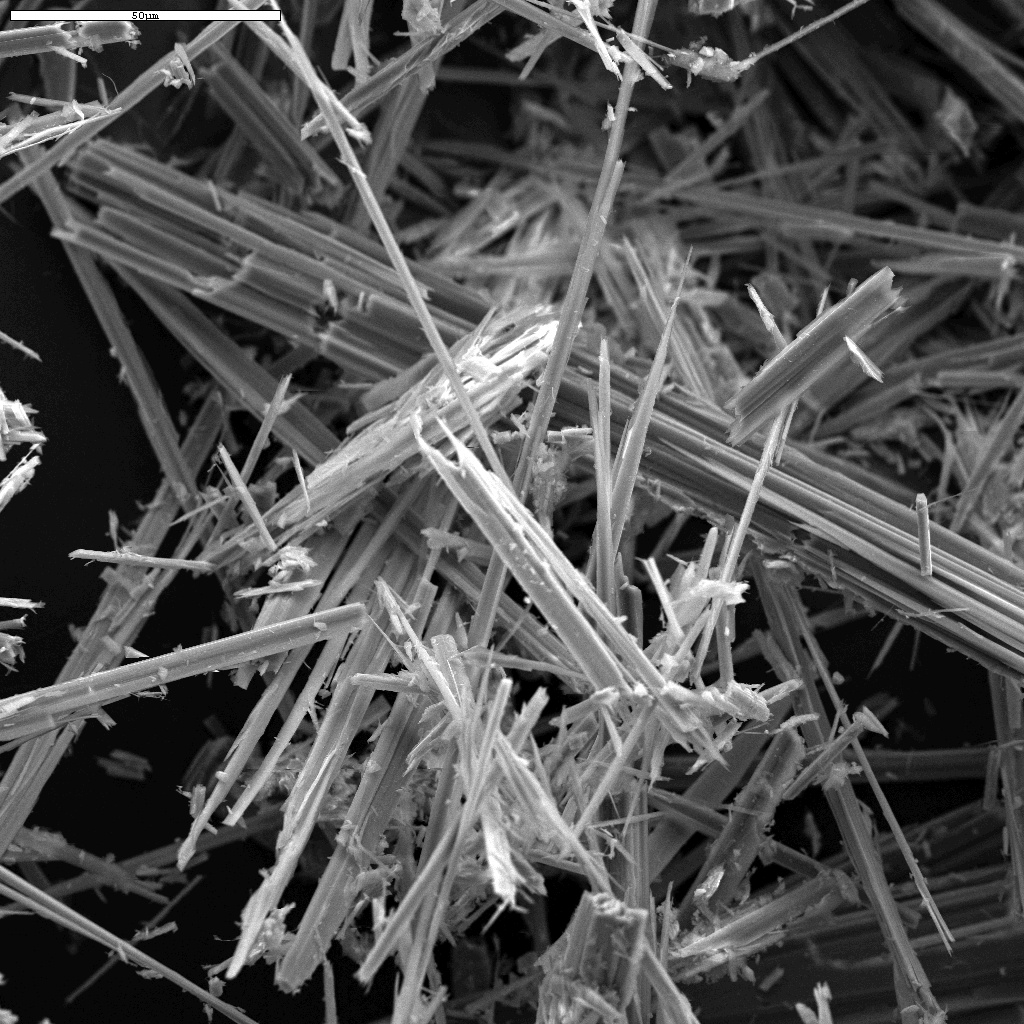
- Court: Court of Appeal
- Citations: [1990] Ch 433, [1991] 1 All ER 929, [1990] 2 WLR 657, [1990] BCLC 479, [1990] BCC 786, [1990] 11 LS Gaz R 36, (1989) Times, 11 March

Court membership
- Judges sitting: Slade LJ, Mustill LJ and Ralph Gibson LJ

Keywords
- Separate legal personality, limited liability

Adams v Cape Industries plc [1990] Ch 433 is a UK company law case on separate legal personality and limited liability of shareholders. The case also addressed long-standing issues under the English conflict of laws as to when a company would be resident in a foreign jurisdiction such that the English courts would recognise the foreign court's jurisdiction over the company. It has in effect been superseded by Lungowe v Vedanta Resources plc, which held that a parent company could be liable for the actions of a subsidiary on ordinary principles of tort law.

The decision's significance was also limited by the House of Lords decision in Lubbe v Cape plc and the groundbreaking decision in Chandler v Cape plc, holding that a direct duty may be owed in tort by a parent company to a person injured by a subsidiary.

== Facts ==
Cape Industries plc was a UK company, head of a group. Its subsidiaries mined asbestos in South Africa and shipped it to Texas in the US, where a marketing subsidiary, NAAC, supplied the asbestos to another company in Texas. Employees of the Texas subsidiary became ill, with asbestosis. They sued Cape and its subsidiaries in a Texas court. Cape was joined and argued there was no jurisdiction to hear the case. Judgment was still entered against Cape for breach of a duty of care in negligence to the employees.

The tort victims tried to enforce the judgment in the UK courts. The requirement, under conflict of laws rules, was either that Cape had consented to be subject to Texas jurisdiction (which was clearly not the case) or that it was present in the US. The question was whether, through the Texas subsidiary, NAAC, Cape Industries plc was ‘present’. For that purpose, the claimants had to show in the UK courts that the veil of incorporation could be lifted and the two companies be treated as one.

Scott J held that the parent, Cape Industries plc, could not be held to be present in the United States. The employees appealed.

== Judgment ==
The Court of Appeal unanimously rejected three allegations: that Cape should be part of a single economic unit, that the subsidiaries were a façade and that any agency relationship existed. All these were rejected "on the facts". Slade LJ (for Mustill LJ and Ralph Gibson LJ) began by noting that to ‘the layman at least the distinction between the case where a company itself trades in a foreign country and the case where it trades in a foreign country through a subsidiary, whose activities it has full power to control, may seem a slender one….’ He approved Sir Godfray’s argument ‘save in cases which turn on the wording of particular statutes or contracts, the court is not free to disregard the principle of Salomon… merely because it considers that justice so requires.’ On the test of the ‘mere façade’, it was emphasised that the motive was relevant whenever such a sham or cloak is alleged, as in Jones v Lipman.

A company must be set up to avoid existing obligations, not future and hypothetical obligations not yet arisen. The court held that one of Cape's subsidiaries (a special purpose vehicle incorporated in Liechtenstein) was in fact a façade, but on the facts, it was not a material subsidiary such as to attribute liability to Cape. Cases like Holdsworth, Scottish Coop and DHN were distinguishable on the basis of particular words on the relevant statutory provisions. It noted that DHN was doubted in Woolfson.

Mr. Morison submitted that the court will lift the corporate veil where a defendant by the device of a corporate structure attempts to evade (i) limitations imposed on his conduct by law; (ii) such rights of relief against him as third parties already possess; and (iii) such rights of relief as third parties may in the future acquire. Assuming that the first and second of these three conditions will suffice in law to justify such a course, neither of them apply in the present case. It is not suggested that the arrangements involved any actual or potential illegality or were intended to deprive anyone of their existing rights. Whether or not such a course deserves moral approval, there was nothing illegal as such in Cape arranging its affairs (whether by the use of subsidiaries or otherwise) so as to attract the minimum publicity to its involvement in the sale of Cape asbestos in the United States of America. As to condition (iii), we do not accept as a matter of law that the court is entitled to lift the corporate veil as against a defendant company which is the member of a corporate group merely because the corporate structure has been used so as to ensure that the legal liability (if any) in respect of particular future activities of the group (and correspondingly the risk of enforcement of that liability) will fall on another member of the group rather than the defendant company. Whether or not this is desirable, the right to use a corporate structure in this manner is inherent in our corporate law. Mr. Morison urged on us that the purpose of the operation was in substance that Cape would have the practical benefit of the group's asbestos trade in the United States of America without the risks of tortious liability. This may be so. However, in our judgment, Cape was in law entitled to organise the group's affairs in that manner and (save in the case of A.M.C. to which special considerations apply) to expect that the court would apply the principle of Salomon v A Salomon & Co Ltd [1897] AC 22 in the ordinary way.

The court separately had to consider whether Cape had established a presence within the United States, such that the English court should recognise the jurisdiction of the United States over Cape, and enforce a US judgment against it (one of the criticisms made of the decision by US lawyers is that the Court of Appeal fundamentally misunderstood the nature of the federal system in the US, but that misunderstanding does not affect the general principles laid down by the court). The Court of Appeal held that for a company to have a presence in the foreign jurisdiction, both of the following must be established:

1. the company has its own fixed place of business (e.g. a branch office) in the jurisdiction from which it has carried on its own business for more than a minimal time.
2. the company's business is transacted from that fixed place of business.

On the facts, the Court of Appeal held that Cape had no fixed place of business in the US such that recognition should not be given to the US judgment awarded against it.

== Significance ==
After the decision (which has been followed), English law has suggested a court cannot lift the corporate veil except when construing a statute, contract or other document; if a company is a "mere façade" concealing the true facts or when a subsidiary company was acting as an authorised agent of its parent, and apparently not so just because "justice requires" or to treat a group of companies as a single economic unit. In the case of tort victims, the House of Lords suggested a remedy would, in fact, be available. In Lubbe v Cape plc Lord Bingham held that the question of proving a duty of care being owed between a parent company and the tort victims of a subsidiary would be answered merely according to standard principles of negligence law: generally whether harm was reasonably foreseeable.

In Chandler v Cape plc, it was held that the corporate veil was not relevant in tort cases, thus effectively circumventing Adams. In VTB Capital plc v Nutritek International Corp, Lord Neuberger remarked, "In addition, there are other cases, notably Adams v Cape Industries plc [1990] Ch 433, where the principle [of piercing the corporate veil] was held to exist (albeit that they include obiter observations and are anyway not binding in this court)."

== See also ==
- UK company law and US corporate law
- Lubbe v Cape Plc [2000] 1 WLR 1545
- Berkey v. Third Avenue Railway 244 N.Y. 602, 155 N.E. 914 (1927) a well known corporate veil case in US corporate law, concerning tort victims
