= Jones v Lipman =

Jones v Lipman case law
- Court: High Court
- Full case name: Concept: Court may lift the corporate veil in some circumstances.one of the example is this JONES VS LIPMAN CASE LAW .
- Citation: [1962] 1 WLR 832

Keywords
- Lifting the veil

Jones v Lipman [1962] 1 WLR 832 is a UK company law case concerning piercing the corporate veil. It exemplifies the principal case in which the veil will be lifted, that is, when a company is used as a "mere facade" concealing the "true facts", which essentially means it is formed to avoid a pre-existing obligation.

== Facts ==
Mr Lipman contracted to sell a house at 3 Fairlawn Avenue, Chiswick, Middlesex (now Ealing W4), to Mr Jones for £5,250. He changed his mind and refused to complete. To try to avoid a specific performance order, he conveyed it to a company formed for that purpose alone, which he alone owned and controlled.

== Judgment ==
Russell J ordered specific performance against Mr Lipman and formed company.

The defendant company is the creature of the first defendant, a device and a sham, a mask which he holds before his face in an attempt to avoid recognition by the eye of equity.

== See also ==
- UK company law
