= Corporate veil in the United Kingdom =

The corporate veil in the United Kingdom is a metaphorical reference used in UK company law for the concept that the rights and duties of a corporation are, as a general principle, the responsibility of that company alone. Just as a natural person cannot generally be held legally accountable for another person's conduct or obligations unless they have expressly or implicitly assumed responsibility, guaranteed or indemnified the other person, shareholders, directors and employees are generally not bound by the rights and duties of a corporation. This concept has traditionally been likened to a "veil" of separation between the legal entity of a corporation and the real people who invest their money and labor into a company's operations.

The corporate veil in the UK is, however, capable of being "lifted", so that the people who run the company are treated as being liable for its debts, or can benefit from its rights, in a very limited number of circumstances defined by the courts. It generally only happens when there is wrongdoing by the people/person in control. This matters mostly when a company has gone insolvent, because unpaid creditors will wish to recover their money if they can prove wrongdoing by the people in control.

== Separate legal personality ==
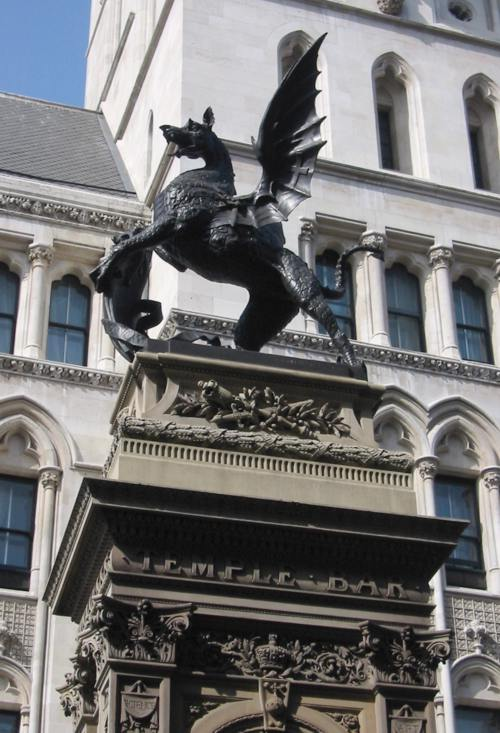
The Corporation of London, which governs the Square Mile from the Griffin at Temple Bar to the Tower of London, is an early example of a separate legal person.

English law recognised long ago that a corporation would have "legal personality". Legal personality simply means the entity is the subject of legal rights and duties. It can sue and be sued. Historically, municipal councils (such as the Corporation of London) or charitable establishments would be the primary examples of corporations. Without a body to be kicked or a soul to be damned, a corporation does not itself suffer penalties administered by courts, but those who stand to lose their investments will. A company will, as a separate person, be the first liable entity for any obligations its directors and employees create on its behalf. If a company does not have enough assets to pay its debts as they fall due, it will be insolvent - bankrupt. Unless an administrator (someone like an auditing firm partner, usually appointed by creditors on a company's insolvency) is able to rescue the business, shareholders will lose their money, employees will lose their jobs and a liquidator will be appointed to sell off any remaining assets to distribute as much as possible to unpaid creditors. Yet if business remains successful, a company can persist forever, even as the natural people who invest in it and carry out its business change or pass away.

== Limited liability ==
Most companies adopt limited liability for their members, seen in the suffix of "Ltd" or "plc". This means that if a company becomes insolvent, unpaid creditors generally cannot seek contributions from the company's shareholders or employees, even where those individuals may have benefited from the company's activities. The liability of a company itself is unlimited (companies have to pay all they owe with the assets they have), but the liability of those who invest their capital in a company is (generally) limited to their shares, and those who invest their labour can only lose their jobs. However, limited liability acts merely as a default position. It can be "contracted around" where creditors have the opportunity and bargaining power to negotiate additional security or guarantees. A bank, for instance, may not lend to a small company unless the company's director gives her own house as security for the loan (e.g., by mortgage). Just as it is possible for two contracting parties to stipulate in an agreement that one's liability will be limited in the event of contractual breach, the default position for companies can be switched back so that shareholders or directors do agree to pay off all debts. If a company's investors do not do this, so their limited liability is not "contracted around", their assets will (generally) be protected from claims of creditors. The assets are beyond reach behind the metaphorical "veil of incorporation".

== Assumption of responsibility ==
- Williams v Natural Life Health Foods Ltd [1998] 1 WLR 830

== Lifting the veil ==
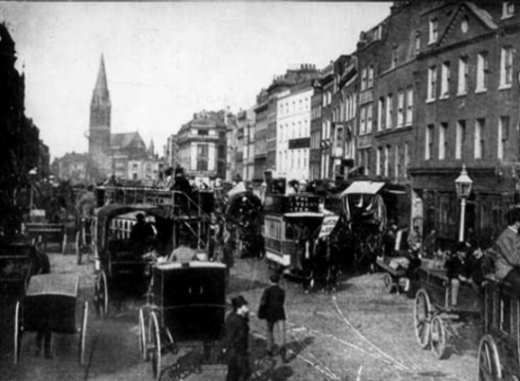
Whitechapel High Street, where Aron Salomon, the most famous litigant in company law, went insolvent.

If a company goes insolvent, there are certain situations where the courts lift the veil of incorporation on a limited company, and make shareholders or directors contribute to paying off outstanding debts to creditors. However, in UK law the range of circumstances is heavily limited. This is usually said to derive from the "principle" in Salomon v A Salomon & Co Ltd. In this leading case, a Whitechapel cobbler incorporated his business under the Companies Act 1862. At that time, seven people were required to register a company, possibly because the legislature had viewed the appropriate business vehicle for fewer people to be a partnership. Mr Salomon met this requirement by getting six family members to subscribe for one share each. Then, in return for money he lent the company, he made the company issue a debenture, which would secure his debt in priority to other creditors in the event of insolvency. The company did go insolvent, and the company liquidator, acting on behalf of unpaid creditors attempted to sue Mr Salomon personally. Although the Court of Appeal held that Mr Salomon had defeated Parliament's purpose in registering dummy shareholders and would have made him indemnify the company, the House of Lords held that, so long as the formal requirements of registration were followed, the shareholders' assets were separate from those of the company as a legal person. There could not, in general, be any lifting of the veil.

=== Wrongful trading ===
The principle in Salomon's case is open to a series of qualifications. Most significantly, statute may require directly or indirectly that the company not be treated as a separate entity. Under the Insolvency Act 1986, section 214 stipulates that company directors must contribute to payment of company debts in winding up if they kept the business running up more debt when they ought to have known there was no reasonable prospect of avoiding insolvency.

=== Statutory purpose ===
A number of other cases demonstrate that in construing the meaning of a statute unrelated to company law, the purpose of the legislation should be fulfilled regardless of the existence of a corporate form. For example, in Daimler Co Ltd v Continental Tyre and Rubber Co (Great Britain) Ltd, the Trading with the Enemy Act 1914 said that trading with any person of "enemy character" would be an offence. So even though the Continental Tyre Co Ltd was a "legal person" incorporated in the UK (and therefore British) its directors and shareholders were German (and therefore enemies, while the First World War was being fought).

- Tunstall v Steigmann [1962] 2 QB 593

=== Avoiding a pre-existing duty ===
There are also case based exceptions to the Salomon principle, though their restrictive scope is not wholly stable. The present rule under English law is that only where a company was set up to commission fraud, or to avoid a pre-existing obligation can its separate identity be ignored. This follows from the leading case, Adams v Cape Industries plc. A group of employees suffered asbestos diseases after working for the American wholly owned subsidiary of Cape Industries plc. They were suing in New York to make Cape Industries plc pay for the debts of the subsidiary. Under conflict of laws principles, this could only be done if Cape Industries plc was treated as "present" in America through its US subsidiary (i.e. ignoring the separate legal personality of the two companies). Rejecting the claim, and following the reasoning in Jones v Lipman, the Court of Appeal emphasised that the US subsidiary had been set up for a lawful purpose of creating a group structure overseas, and had not aimed to circumvent liability in the event of asbestos litigation.

=== Tort victims ===
The harsh effect on tort victims, who are unable to contract around limited liability and may be left only with a worthless claim against a bankrupt entity, has been ameliorated in cases where a duty of care in negligence may be deemed to be owed directly across the veil of incorporation.

- Lee v Lee’s Air Farming Ltd [1961] AC 12, a statutory compensation system in part operated because the veil was not lifted, and a director was treated as a worker of the company
- Connelly v RTZ Corp Plc [1998] AC 854
- Lubbe v Cape Plc [2000] 1 WLR 1545
- Chandler v Cape plc [2011] EWHC 951 (QB) held that a parent company (Cape plc) owed a duty of care to one of the employees of a subsidiary company

=== Company groups ===
The restrictive position has also been criticised where a company group is involved, since it is not clear that companies and individuals should receive the protection of limited liability in identical ways. An influential decision, although subsequently doubted strongly by the House of Lords, was passed by Lord Denning MR in DHN Ltd v Tower Hamlets BC. Here Lord Denning MR held that a group of companies, two subsidiaries wholly owned by a parent, constituted a single economic unit. Because the companies' shareholders and controlling minds were identical, their rights were to be treated as the same. This allowed the parent company to claim compensation from the council for compulsory purchase of its business, which it could not have done without showing an address on the premises that its subsidiary possessed. Similar approaches to treating corporate "groups" or a "concern" as single economic entities exist in many continental European jurisdictions. This is done for tax and accounting purposes in English law, however for general civil liability the rule still followed is that in Adams v Cape Industries plc. It is very rare for English courts to lift the veil. The liability of the company is generally attributed to the company alone.

- Creasey v Breachwood Motors Ltd [1992] B.C.C. 638, now overruled, enforcing a claim for wrongful dismissal by a director of an insolvent subsidiary against a parent
- Ord v Belhaven Pubs Ltd [1998] 2 BCLC 447, Court of Appeal overturns High Court that treats a company group as a single economic unit
- Farstad Supply A/S v Enviroco Ltd [2011] UKSC, held that where the shares in a company had been pledged, that company ceased to be a subsidiary company CA 1985 s 736, now CA 2006 s 1159 and Sch 6, because the company which pledged the shares ceased to be a member.
- Duport Steels Ltd v Sirs [1980] ICR 161, strike action against a parent company
- UK tax law
- EU Seventh Company Law Directive 83/349, on group accounts
- Concern (business)
- EU Draft Ninth Company Law Directive, on corporate groups

=== Criminal law ===
In English criminal law there have been cases in which the courts have been prepared to pierce the veil of incorporation. For example, in confiscation proceedings under the Proceeds of Crime Act 2002 monies received by a company can, depending upon the particular facts of the case as found by the court, be regarded as having been 'obtained' by an individual (who is usually, but not always, a director of the company). In consequence those monies may become an element in the individual's 'benefit' obtained from criminal conduct (and hence subject to confiscation from him). A useful brief summary of the position regarding 'piercing the veil' in English criminal law was given in the Court of Appeal judgment in the case of R v Seager [2009] EWCA Crim 1303 in which the court said (at para 76):

"There was no major disagreement between counsel on the legal principles by reference to which a court is entitled to "pierce" or "rend" or "remove" the "corporate veil". It is "hornbook" law that a duly formed and registered company is a separate legal entity from those who are its shareholders and it has rights and liabilities that are separate from its shareholders. A court can "pierce" the carapace of the corporate entity and look at what lies behind it only in certain circumstances. It cannot do so simply because it considers it might be just to do so. Each of these circumstances involves impropriety and dishonesty. The court will then be entitled to look for the legal substance, not the just the form. In the context of criminal cases the courts have identified at least three situations when the corporate veil can be pierced. First if an offender attempts to shelter behind a corporate façade, or veil to hide his crime and his benefits from it. Secondly, where an offender does acts in the name of a company which (with the necessary mens rea) constitute a criminal offence which leads to the offender's conviction, then "the veil of incorporation is not so much pierced as rudely torn away": per Lord Bingham in Jennings v CPS, paragraph 16. Thirdly, where the transaction or business structures constitute a "device", "cloak" or "sham", i.e. an attempt to disguise the true nature of the transaction or structure so as to deceive third parties or the courts."

== International comparisons ==
=== Germany ===
- Konzernrecht
- Durchgriffshaftung

=== United States ===
- Berkey v. Third Avenue Railway, Cardozo J decides there was no right to pierce the veil for a personal injury victim
- Walkovszky v. Carlton 223 N.E.2d 6 (NY 1966) where the New York Court of Appeals refused to pierce the veil merely because a subsidiary was undercapitalised. A corporation was set up for every taxi cab in that was in fact being run by Mr Carlton's company, each with $10,000 of insurance. One of the cab's hit a pedestrian and damages were more than the insurance, but by a majority the court held the veil could not be lifted.
- Minton v. Cavaney, 56 Cal. 2.d 576 (1961) Justice Roger Traynor pierced a veil so a girl who drowned in a swimming pool would be compensated, saying parent companies or shareholders would be treated as liable "when they provide inadequate capitalization and actively participate in the conduct of corporate affairs."
- Kinney Shoe Corp. v. Polan 939 F.2d 209 (4th Cir. 1991) the veil was pierced where its enforcement would not have matched the purpose of limited liability. Here a corporation was undercapitalised and was only used to shield a shareholder's other company from debts.
- Perpetual Real Estate Services, Inc. v. Michaelson Properties, Inc. 974 F.2d 545 (4th Cir. 1992) holding that no piercing could take place merely to prevent "unfairness" or "injustice", where a corporation in a real estate building partnership could not pay its share of a lawsuit bill
- Fletcher v. Atex, Inc 8 F.3d 1451 (2d Cir. 1995)
- Taylor v. Standard Gas Co. 306 U.S. 307 (1939), insiders who become creditors of a company are subordinated to other creditors when the company goes insolvent. This will happen where it is "equitable", and is known as the "Deep Rock doctrine".
- Sindell v. Abbott Laboratories, 607P 2d 924 (Cal), 449 US 912 (1980), California Supreme Court holds drug manufacturers liable to injured victims according to their portion of market share

== See also ==
- UK company law
- UK insolvency law
