= Woolfson v Strathclyde Regional Council =

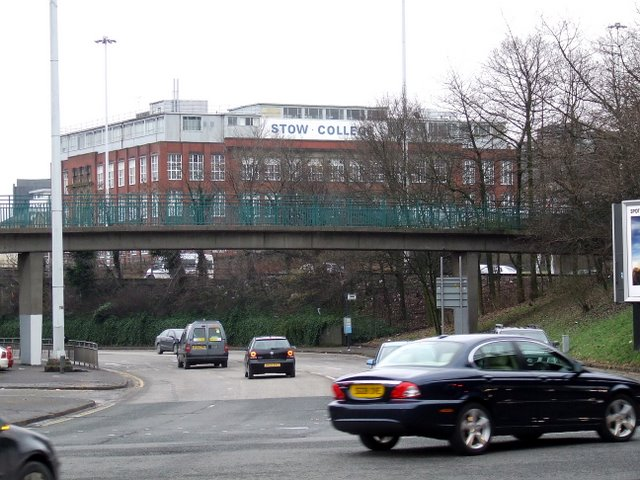
- Court: House of Lords
- Citations: [1978] UKHL 5, 1978 SLT 159, 38 P& CR 521

Court membership
- Judges sitting: Lord Keith, Lord Wilberforce, Lord Fraser and Lord Russell

Woolfson v Strathclyde Regional Council [1978] UKHL 5 is a UK company law case concerning piercing the corporate veil.

== Facts ==
A bridal clothing shop at 53-61 St George's Road was compulsorily purchased by the Glasgow Corporation. The business in the shop was run by a company called Campbell Ltd. But the shop itself, though all on one floor, was composed of different units of property. Mr Solomon Woolfson owned three units and another company, Solfred Holdings Ltd owned the other two. Mr Woolfson had 999 shares in Campbell Ltd and his wife the other. They had twenty and ten shares respectively in Solfred Ltd. Mr Woolfson and Solfred Ltd claimed compensation together for loss of business after the compulsory purchase, arguing that this situation was analogous to the case of DHN v Tower Hamlets LBC.

The Land Tribunal denied it on the basis that Campbell Ltd was the sole occupier.

== Judgment ==
Lord Keith upheld the decision of the Scottish Court of Appeal, refusing to follow and doubting DHN v Tower Hamlets BC. He said that DHN was easily distinguishable because Mr Woolfson did not own all the shares in Solfred, as Bronze was wholly owned by DHN, and Campbell had no control at all over the owners of the land. The one situation where the veil could be lifted was whether there are special circumstances indicating that the company is a ‘mere façade concealing the true facts’. Lord Keith's judgment dealt with DHN as follows.

It was maintained before this House that the conclusion of the Lord Justice-Clerk was erroneous. In my opinion the conclusion was correct, and I regard as unimpeachable the process of reasoning by which it was reached. I can see no grounds whatever, upon the facts found in the special case, for treating the company structure as a mere façade, nor do I consider that the D.H.N. Food Distributors case (supra) is, on a proper analysis, of assistance to the appellants' argument. The position there was that compensation for disturbance was claimed by a group of three limited companies associated in a wholesale grocery business. The parent company, D.H.N., carried on the business in the premises which were the subject of compulsory purchase. These premises were owned by Bronze, which had originally been the wholly owned subsidiary of a bank which had advanced money for the purchase of the premises, but which had later become the wholly owned subsidiary of D.H.N. Bronze had the same directors as D.H.N. and the premises were its only asset. It carried on no activities whatever. The third company, also a wholly owned subsidiary of D.H.N., owned as its only asset the vehicles used in the grocery business, and it too carried on no operations. The compulsory acquisition resulted in the extinction of the grocery business, since no suitable alternative premises could be found. It was held by the Court of Appeal (Lord Denning M.R., Goff and Shaw LL. J.) that the group was entitled to compensation for disturbance as owners of the business. The grounds for the decision were (1) that since D.H.N. was in a position to control its subsidiaries in every respect, it was proper to pierce the corporate veil and treat the group as a single economic entity for the purpose of awarding compensation for disturbance; (2) that if the companies were to be treated as separate entities, there was by necessary implication from the circumstances an agreement between D.H.N. and Bronze under which the former had an irrevocable licence to occupy the premises for as long as it wished, and that this gave D.H.N. a sufficient interest in the land to found a claim to compensation for disturbance and (3) (per Goff and Shaw LL.J.) that in the circumstances Bronze held the legal title to the premises in trust for D.H.N., which also sufficed to entitle D.H.N. to compensation for disturbance. It is the first of those grounds which alone is relevant for present purposes. I have some doubts whether in this respect the Court of Appeal properly applied the principle that it is appropriate to pierce the corporate veil only where special circumstances exist indicating that is a mere façade concealing the true facts. Further, the decisions of this House in Caddies v Harold Holdsworth & Co (Wake-field) Ltd 1955 S.C. (H.L.) 27 and Meyer v Scottish Co-operative Wholesale Society Ltd 1958 S.C. (H.L.) 40, which were founded on by Goff L.J. in support of this ground of judgment and, as to the first of them, to some extent also by Lord Denning, M.R., do not, with respect, appear to me to be concerned with that principle. But however that may be, I consider the D.H.N. Food case to be clearly distinguishable on its facts from the present case. There the company that owned the land was the wholly owned subsidiary of the company that carried on the business. The latter was in complete control of the situation as respects anything which might affect its business, and there was no one but itself having any kind of interest or right as respects the assets of the subsidiary. Here, on the other hand, the company that carried on the business, Campbell, has no sort of control whatever over the owners of the land, Solfred and Woolfson. Woolfson holds two-thirds only of the shares in Solfred and Solfred has no interest in Campbell. Woolfson cannot be treated as beneficially entitled to the whole share-holding in Campbell, since it is not found that the one share in Campbell held by his wife is held as his nominee. In my opinion there is no basis consonant with principle upon which on the facts of this case the corporate veil can be pierced to the effect of holding Woolfson to be the true owner of Campbell's business or of the assets of Solfred.

Lords Wilberforce, Fraser and Russell and Dundy concurred.

== See also ==
- UK company law
- The Albazero [1977] AC 774, 807, Roskill LJ, ‘the rights of one company in a group cannot be exercised by another company in that group even though the ultimate benefit of the exercise of those rights would ensure beneficially to the same person or corporate body.’
- Bank of Tokyo Ltd v Karoon [1987] AC 45n, 64, Robert Goff LJ, ‘Counsel suggested beguilingly that it would be technical for us to distinguish between parent company and subsidiary in this context; economically, he said, they were one. But we are concerned not with economics but with law. The distinction between the two is, in law, fundamental and cannot here be abridged.’
- Canada Safeway Ltd v Local 373, Canadian Food and Allied Workers (1974) 46 DLR (3d) 113, that there is no secondary action against an associated company. This was not followed in Dimbleby & Sons Ltd v National Union of Journalists [1984] 1 All ER 751
- Adams v Cape Industries plc [1990] Ch 433
