= Undercapitalization =

Underfunding of a business

Under-capitalization refers to any situation where a business cannot acquire the funds they need. An under-capitalized business may be one that cannot afford current operational expenses due to a lack of capital, which can trigger bankruptcy, may be one that is over-exposed to risk, or may be one that is financially sound but does not have the funds required to expand to meet market demand.

== Causes of under-capitalization ==
Under-capitalization is often a result of improper financial planning. However, a viable business may have difficulty raising sufficient capital during an economic downturn or in a country that imposes artificial constraints on capital investment.

There are several different causes of undercapitalization, including:

- Financing growth with short-term capital, rather than permanent capital
- Failing to secure an adequate bank loan at a critical time
- Failing to obtain insurance against predictable business risks
- Adverse macroeconomic conditions

Accountants can structure the financials in order to minimize profit, and thus taxes. As a business grows, this approach becomes counterproductive (Van Horn 2006). Frequently, a growing business will apply for a bank loan only to find their entire accounting system under review.

== Capital sources ==
A manual on collecting capital, by CPA David Levinson, states that one solid approach to assuring capital is to establish a line of credit, borrow against it, even if it is not needed, then pay back this loan. Doing this repeatedly can help a business owner expand their capital when they need to increase their credit or take out a larger loan (Levinson 1998).

A business may acquire capital through re-investment of earnings, through assuming debt or through selling equity. According to Van Horn,

- The least expensive ways to raise capital are to finance from cash flow, and to improve cash flow through regular invoicing, collecting overdue receivables, stretching payables without incurring interest or penalties, renegotiating loans for lower interest rates and exploiting trade discounts.
- Debt is more expensive. The cost of debt is lowest with secured, long-term loans or use of personal savings, higher with unsecured loans, credit card loans and cash advances, and with factoring accounts receivable.
- Equity financing is most expensive, and dilutes the value of existing owners' shares in the business. It may be the only option if a business has good prospects but insufficient assets to secure loans. Equity capital may be raised through additional investments from existing partners or stockholders, private placement capital, venture capital, taking on a partner who makes a financial or "sweat equity" investment, or issuing additional shares.

Undercapitalization may result from failure of a business to take advantage of these capital sources, or from inability to raise capital using any of these sources.

== Bankruptcy of an undercapitalized subsidiary ==
When a subsidiary of a corporation files for bankruptcy, there may be reason to suspect that it was deliberately undercapitalized and mismanaged for the benefit of the parent corporation. The main cause of failure may have been excessive payments to the parent for goods or services provided by the parent, or inadequate charges for goods or services provided to the parent. In effect, capital provided by other investors was channeled to the parent corporation until the subsidiary failed. These cases can be extremely difficult to prove, but the Deep Rock doctrine ensures that the parent corporation's claims are only settled after all other claims.

However, as decided in Walkovszky v. Carlton, the parent corporation is not responsible for settling claims in excess of remaining assets when an undercapitalized subsidiary fails.

== Banking industry ==
In the banking industry, undercapitalization refers to having insufficient capital to cover foreseeable risks.

=== United States ===
The Federal Deposit Insurance Corporation (FDIC) classifies banks according to their risk-based capital ratio:

- Well capitalized: 10% or higher
- Adequately capitalized: 8% or higher
- Undercapitalized: less than 8%
- Significantly undercapitalized: less than 6%
- Critically undercapitalized: less than 2%

When a bank becomes undercapitalized the FDIC issues a warning to the bank. When the number drops below 6% the FDIC can change management and force the bank to take other corrective action. When the bank becomes critically undercapitalized the FDIC declares the bank insolvent and can take over management of the bank.

The subprime mortgage crisis has shown that banks and other mortgage issuers in the US were undercapitalized, failing to ensure that they had sufficient capital or insurance to cover the risk of mortgage defaults in the event of the bursting of a housing price bubble. Since the affected institutions were important sources of capital to other industries, this triggered the 2008 financial crisis.

== Macroeconomics ==
A country or sector of the economy may be undercapitalized in the sense that businesses in that country or sector are handicapped by lack of affordable investment funds. This can be caused by political instability, by lack of confidence in the rule of law, by constraints on foreign direct investment imposed by the government, or by other actions that discourage investment in certain industrial sectors. Examples:

- In the electricity sector in Argentina, the government introduced controls on energy prices in 2002, reducing profitability and thus discouraging capital investment. This was compounded by high inflation, which caused declines in real revenue, while devaluation of the peso increased the cost of servicing high levels of debt in foreign currency. The result was severe undercapitalization, which led to inability to keep up with increasing demand, contributing to the 2004 Argentine energy crisis.
- In Pakistan, the textile industry has been undercapitalized for decades. Among other factors, this is due to protectionist actions by the developed countries that should be natural markets for the industry's output. These include subsidies of locally produced raw materials (e.g. cotton in the US), subsidies on local textile industries and high import tariffs on goods manufactured in Pakistan and other low-cost garment producers.
- Resource extraction in the Democratic Republic of Congo (e.g. mining) has been undercapitalized for many years due to endemic violence and looting, uncertain property rights and concerns about corruption. Although the potential is huge, the risks are also huge. Only the bravest investor would supply capital in this environment.

Jeffry A. Frieden notes that during the period of European colonialism the colonial powers encouraged investment in production of raw materials while discouraging investment in industries that would use these materials as inputs in competition with the colonial power's home industries. During the same period, independent developing countries in Latin America and other areas pursued a policy of import substitution industrialization which diverted capital from other enterprises where these countries had a comparative advantage. Although opposite in intent, both policies created overcapitalization in some sectors and undercapitalization in others.

A contrary view comes from the economist Robert Solow, who was awarded the Nobel prize for his work on the ways in which labor, capital and technical progress contribute to overall economic growth. Among other insights, Solow showed that undercapitalization appears to have less impact on economic growth than would be predicted by earlier economic theories.

== See also ==
- Banking
- Bankruptcy
- Capital
- Capital market
- Finance
- Investment
- Microeconomics
- Mortgages
- Piercing the corporate veil
