= FLP =

FLP may refer to:

== Computer science ==
- FLP impossibility proof in computer science
- Functional logic programming

== Organizations ==
- Family Limited Partnership, holding companies
- Forever Living Products, a US MLM company
- Forum Lingkar Pena, an Indonesian writers' collective

=== Politics ===
- Farmer–Labor Party, a former US party
- Fatherland Party (Norway), a former party (Norwegian: Fedrelandspartiet)
- Fiji Labour Party
- Finnish Rural Party, a former party (Swedish: Finlands landsbygdsparti)
- Le front de libération populaire, a former party in Quebec, Canada
- Popular Liberation Front (Spain), a former party (Spanish: Frente de Liberación Popular)

== Science ==
- Flurbiprofen
- Frustrated Lewis pair

== Transportation ==
- Lugano–Ponte Tresa railway (Italian: Ferrovia Lugano–Ponte Tresa)
- Marion County Regional Airport, in Arkansas, United States
- Satish Dhawan Space Centre First Launch Pad, in India

== See also ==
- Windows Fundamentals for Legacy PCs (WinFLP)
