= Secretary of State for Trade and Industry v Bottrill =

- Court: Court of Appeal of England and Wales
- Decided: 12 February 1999
- Citations: [1999] EWCA Civ 781, [1999] BCC 177, [1999] ICR 592

Court membership
- Judges sitting: Lord Woolf MR, Peter Gibson LJ and Mantell LJ

Keywords
- Lifting the corporate veil, employee

Secretary of State for Trade and Industry v Bottrill [1999] EWCA Civ 781 is a UK company law and UK labour law case, which relates to issues such as lifting the corporate veil and the definition of "employee".

== Facts ==
Mr Bottrill was the managing director of the insolvent Magnatech UK Ltd, the fact that he was the only shareholder did not preclude his claim for unpaid wages (£346.15 a week) from the National Insurance Fund. Mr Bottrill’s sole shareholding was merely a temporary measure before the American Magnatech Group would take over ownership.

== Judgment ==
Lord Woolf MR held that Mr Bottrill was an "employee" for the purpose of access to the statutory compensation fund.

The gloss sought to be given by Mummery P to “employee” in the ERA, based as it is on the ability of the controlling shareholder to prevent his dismissal, is all the more surprising when applied to a case such as the present when Mr. Bottrill was powerless to prevent his actual dismissal which triggered his claim… We recognise the attractions of having in relation to the ERA a simple and clear test which will determine whether a shareholder or a director is an employee for the purposes of the Act or not. However, the Act does not provide such a test and it is far from obvious what Parliament would have intended the test to be. We do not find any justification for departing from the well-established position in the law of employment generally. That is whether or not an employer or employee relationship exists can only be decided by having regard to all the relevant facts. If an individual has a controlling shareholding that is certainly a fact which is likely to be significant in all situations and in some cases it may prove to be decisive. However, it is only one of the factors which are relevant and certainly is not to be taken as determinative without considering all the relevant circumstances.

== See also ==
- UK insolvency law
- UK labour law
