= R&B Customs Brokers Co Ltd v United Dominions Trust Ltd =

R&B Customs Brokers Co. Ltd. v. United Dominions Trust Ltd.
- Court: Court of Appeal
- Decided: 21 December 1987
- Citations: [1987] EWCA Civ 3, [1988] 1 WLR 321

Case opinions
- Dillon LJ

Keywords
- Unfair terms, consumer

R&B Customs Brokers Co. Ltd. v. United Dominions Trust Ltd. [1987] EWCA Civ 3 is an English contract law case, concerning unfair terms under the Unfair Contract Terms Act 1977.

== Facts ==
R&B was a shipping broker and a freight forwarding agent, but merely a two-person company. It bought a second-hand car from United Dominions Trust, as a company car driver by Mr Bell, the managing director. The car roof leaked, a breach of section 14(3) of the Sale of Goods Act 1979. An exemption clause in the contract for the car provided that the implied conditions about fitness for purpose were excluded. R&B argued that this was contrary to UCTA 1977 section 6, and United Dominions contended that R&B could not avail themselves of the Act because as a business they could not count as a consumer.

== Judgment ==
Dillon LJ held that the exclusion clause would have passed the reasonableness test under UCTA 1977 section 6(3), section 11 and Schedule 2. In fact the company was dealing as a consumer, and therefore section 6(2) applied to make the SGA 1979 mandatory; exclusion was not a possibility. ‘In the course of business’ under section 12(1)(a) means where it is integral to the business or forms part of the regular course of dealing of the business. R&B did not hold itself out as purchasing for a business beyond the mere fact that it was being put in the business’ name. On the facts it was the second or third vehicle acquired on credit terms (hence buying cars was incidental to the business), and Mr Bell was mainly using it to get to work. He added that another approach would be to pierce the corporate veil, following DHN Food Distributors Ltd v Tower Hamlets London BC [1976] 1 WLR 852, 860 per Lord Denning MR and 861 per Goff LJ to look at the realities of the situation.

== See also ==
- Unfair Contract Terms Bill
- Interpreting contracts in English law
