= Jim's Restaurants =

Chain of restaurants in Texas

- Type: Private
- Industry: Casual dining restaurant
- Founded: 1947; 79 years ago in San Antonio, Texas, United States
- Founders: Germano "Jim" Hasslocher; Veva Ball Hasslocher
- Headquarters: San Antonio, Texas
- Number of locations: 13
- Key people: Jimmy Hasslocher, President & CEO
- Owner: Frontier Enterprises
- Website: www.jimsrestaurants.com

Jim's Restaurants is an American chain of restaurants owned by Uptown San Antonio, Texas-based Frontier Enterprises. Jim's, most well known for its breakfast and charbroiled hamburgers, was started in 1947 when Germano "Jim" Hasslocher and his business partner and wife Veva Ball Hasslocher built their first burger stand. At its peak, Jim's had locations in San Antonio, Austin, Houston, San Marcos, Waco, and Temple.

Jim Hasslocher remained CEO until his death on November 18, 2015 at the age of 93. The current CEO is their son, Jimmy Hasslocher. As of April 2024, Frontier Enterprises operates 12 locations in the San Antonio area and 3 in Austin.

== History ==
Germano "Jim" Hasslocher and his wife and business partner Veva Ball Hasslocher founded Jim's Restaurants (originally named Jim's Coffee Shop) in 1963, but his first restaurants were Frontier Drive-In, which became Frontier Enterprises, Inc. Over the years, Frontier Enterprises included:

- Frontier Drive-In (1947–early 1990s)
- Jim's (1963–present)
- Tower Foods, restaurant at the top of Tower of the Americas at HemisFair Plaza (1968–2004)
- The Magic Time Machine (1973–present)
- The Wayward Lady riverboat restaurant in Corpus Christi, Texas (1984–1988)
- Mississippi Riverboat Amusement of Biloxi (Biloxi Belle casino in Mississippi) (1992– )
- La Fonda Alamo Heights (2014–present)
- Frontier Burger (2016–present)

Frontier Drive-In primarily served hamburgers, onion rings, and milkshakes and became a drive-in burger concept with carhops which eventually led to full-service restaurants in several locations. Jim's Restaurants likewise became famous for their hamburgers as well as serving breakfast diner dishes 24 hours a day.

=== Relationship to Shoney's and Champs ===
In 1998, Jim's Restaurants bought eight Shoney's, and converted them to Jim's. These restaurants did not do well financially.

Jim's Restaurant had several locations in Houston, which they sold. Terry Parsons, who worked as a manager with Frontier Enterprises for many years, took ownership of these Houston restaurants under a new name, Champs Restaurants, and opened several other, new restaurants within the new Champs chain.

== Political influence ==
Founder Jim Hasslocher was president of the National Restaurant Association lobbying organization in 1986, the Texas Restaurant Association in 1960, and the San Antonio Restaurant Association in 1956. Veva Hasslocher was a founding member and two-time president of the San Antonio Restaurant Association Women's Auxiliary. Their son the current CEO, Jimmy Hasslocher, served five terms on the San Antonio City Council, was the mayor pro-tem, sits on the board of the city hospital district, and also was the president of the Texas Restaurant Association.

As such, Jim's Restaurants CEOs have often been locally influential and vocally advocated for specific policies that they feel affect restaurant owners. Some positions they have taken include:

- (1968) Helping pass the Liquor by the Drink law in Texas, resulting in restaurants being able to sell mixed drinks
- (2013) Speaking out against the Affordable Care Act ("Obamacare")
- (2019) Speaking out against a city Safe and Sick Leave ordinance, which required employers to provide paid sick leave

== Estate feuds and pandemic scandal ==
Jim and Veva Hasslocher had five children, all of whom worked for Frontier Enterprises at some point. Frontier Enterprises was a privately held family partnership under a parent company named Hasslocher Enterprises, that was worth an estimated $30 million in 2016 (equivalent to about $39 million in 2024). The parents established a succession plan with a no-contest clause in their wills.

Veva died in 2009, and Jim died in 2015. In 2019, daughters Caryn and Susan Hasslocher filed a lawsuit against their brother and CEO Jimmy Hasslocher over ownership interests and payments.

In 2020, when restaurants in Texas were closed during the COVID-19 pandemic, Jim's Restaurants were again in the news: they furloughed about 1,000 employees even though they accepted more than $6.8 million from the Paycheck Protection Program to cover payroll and other costs during the business closure time.

Jim's Restaurants continue to struggle after these recent scandals: several restaurants closed, and most of the remaining ones are open under reduced hours.

== See also ==
- List of hamburger restaurants
