= E Green & Sons (Castings) Ltd v ASTMS =

- Court: Employment Appeal Tribunal
- Citation: [1984] IRLR 135, [1984] ICR 352

Court membership
- Judge sitting: Nolan J

Keywords
- Information and consultation

E Green & Sons (Castings) Ltd v ASTMS [1984] IRLR 135 (EAT) is a UK labour law case, concerning the information and consultation in the European Union.

== Facts ==
Three subsidiary companies of the ‘Green Economisers Group plc’ operated from the same premises. EG&S (Castings) Ltd sacked 97 employees. Green & Son sacked 36 employees. EG&S (Site Services) Ltd sacked 24 employees. All this happened without consultation. They all shared accounting services, and the personnel director of the holding company was responsible for all the subsidiaries. The managing director was responsible for the decision to make redundancies in each. The workers claimed that more than 100 people were dismissed by the same employer at one establishment, to get longer consultation. Tribunal held that the employees were dismissed from the same ‘establishment’ within the meaning of EPA 1975 s 99. The companies applied for review on the ground that all employees signed separate contracts with the companies, which were different ‘employers’, under the Act.

== Judgment ==
Nolan J held that the corporate veil cannot be lifted. This was three separate employers. One establishment does not mean one premises and business. Employment is between the subsidiary and the employee, because the relationship is determined by the contract of employment. No further inquiry is necessary.

We regard it as plain that each of the appellant companies was a separate “employer” for the purposes of section 99(3). The definition section, section 126(1), refers one back, for the meaning of “employer,” to section 30(1) of the Trade Union and Labour Relations Act 1974. So far as relevant that section, as amended by paragraph 7 of Schedule 16 to the Act of 1975, defines an “employee” as an individual who has entered into a contract of employment and an “employer” as the person by whom the employee is employed. We, like the industrial tribunal, regard the contract of employment as providing the correct means of identifying both the employee and the employer for the purposes of section 99. If we had any doubt about the matter, which we have not, it would be removed by the consideration that the definition of “associated employer” in section 30(5) of the Trade Union and Labour Relations Act 1974 is also imported into the Act of 1975 by section 126(1). The effect of the definition, shortly stated, is that companies forming part of the same group may be treated as if they were a single employer. If the legislature had intended to achieve that effect in section 99, then no doubt it would have included a reference to “associated employers” in the section: but it has not.

== See also ==
- UK labour law
- Codetermination
- DHN Ltd v Tower Hamlets LBC
