= Kosmopoulos v Constitution Insurance Co of Canada =

Supreme Court of Canada case

- Supreme Court of Canada

Hearing: November 1, 6, 1985 Judgment: January 29, 1987
- Full case name: Constitution Insurance Company of Canada, Simcoe & Erie General Insurance Company, Providence Washington Insurance Company, Security National Insurance Company, Upper Canada Insurance Company, Canadian Home Assurance Company, The Contingency Insurance Company Limited v Andreas Kosmopoulos and Kosmopoulos Leather Goods Limited and Aristides Roussakis and Art Roussakis Insurance Agency Limited
- Citations: [1987] 1 S.C.R. 2
- Prior history: APPEAL AND CROSS‑APPEAL from a judgment of the Ontario Court of Appeal dismissing the insurers' appeal and Kosmopoulos' cross‑appeal (against the insurance agency) from a judgment of R. E. Holland J. in favour of Kosmopoulos in an action on a fire insurance policy.
- Ruling: Appeal and cross‑appeal dismissed.

Court membership
- Chief Justice: Brian Dickson; Puisne Justices: Jean Beetz, Willard Estey, William McIntyre, Julien Chouinard, Antonio Lamer, Bertha Wilson, Gerald Le Dain, Gérard La Forest

Reasons given
- Majority: Wilson J., joined by Beetz, Lamer, Le Dain and La Forest JJ.
- Concurrence: McIntyre J.
- Chouinard J. took no part in the consideration or decision of the case.

Kosmopoulos v Constitution Insurance Co of Canada is a Supreme Court of Canada decision on the court's ability to pierce the corporate veil—to impose an interest or liability, that is, upon the shareholders of a company instead of the company itself. It was held that the veil can only be lifted where it would be "just and equitable", specifically to third parties.

The case is also a source of insurance law. The insurer refused to indemnify Mr. Kosmopoulos on the grounds that the corporation owned the property, even though he was the sole-shareholder of the corporation. The insurer's position was consistent with the 1925 decision of the House of Lords in Macaura v Northern Assurance Co Ltd.

Although the SCC rejected the plaintiffs corporate veil argument, and his bailee argument, the court did not uphold the Macaura rule. The ratio of this case is that an insured may recover an indemnity so long as they meet the factual expectancy test, regardless of whether they have bare legal title to the subject matter of the insurance contract.

== Background ==
Mr. Kosmopoulos had a leather goods company for which he was the sole shareholder and director. His lease for the company office was under his own name from when he originally ran the business as a sole proprietor. The fire insurance policies showed the insured as being the sole proprietor even though the insurance agency was well aware of the fact that the business was being carried on by the incorporated company. (His insurance agency knew that he was under the lease as himself but carried on business as a corporation.) A fire in a neighbouring lot damaged his office; however, the insurance company refused to cover his damages.

Under the common law, as established by Salomon v. Salomon, corporations are entirely separate entities from those who run it, and thus contracts made by the company cannot apply to anyone but the company itself.

Business corporations are purely a creature of statute; there is no common law basis for the proposition that a corporation is a separate legal entity from that of its shareholder (that is, this paragraph questions part of the veracity of the preceding paragraph). Although Salomon v. Salomon is often cited as a reference for that proposition, the decision in Salomon v. Salomon was based on the clear language of the statute under which the corporation at issue was created, namely the Companies Act 1862 (UK). Nevertheless, although it is based solely on statute, business corporations are in fact separate legal entities: for example, §15(1) of the Canada Business Corporations Act states that "[a] corporation has the capacity and, subject to this Act, the rights, powers and privileges of a natural person."

At trial, the judge held that Mr. Kosmopoulos could not recover damages as owner for the assets of the business as they were owned by the company and not him, but that he could recover as insured because of his insurable interest in the building. This ruling was upheld on appeal, with the court noting that as companies could, thanks to recent laws, have a sole shareholder, Macaura could be restricted to cases involving multiple shareholders.

The issue before the Court was whether the assets of Mr. Kosmopoulos, as shareholder, were covered by the insurance.

== Reasons of the court ==
The Court upheld the ruling of the lower courts.

First of all, the Court decided that this was not a situation where they should "lift the corporate veil".

To reach this conclusion the Court examined the requirements to "lift the veil". Wilson J. explained:

The law on when a court may disregard this principle by "lifting the corporate veil" and regarding the company as a mere "agent" or a "puppet" of its controlling shareholder or a parent corporation follows no consistent principle. The best that can be said is that the "separate entities" principle is not enforced when it would yield a result "too flagrantly opposed to justice, convenience or the interest of the Revenue".

The Court decided that in the current case, lifting the veil would unfairly allow the owner to enjoy the benefits of incorporation while avoiding the costs.

The court also rejected the owner's argument that he was a bailor (i.e., taking care) of the companies' assets. Since the company still "possessed" the assets, they could not be considered as bailed without "lifting the veil".

However, the court found that the owner, as insured, held an insurable interest in the assets—that is, he had enough of a link to the assets to validly insure them (one cannot insure, for example, a building they have nothing to do with). In doing so, the court rejected the Macaura principle that limited an insurable interest to those having legal or equitable title to an asset. Instead, they applied the "factual expectancy test" (another test proposed by the House of Lords in Lucena v. Craufurd, the 1806 case relied on for the Macaura decision). According to this test, in order to insure something and recover for it, one must have "some relation to, or concern in the subject of the insurance, which relation or concern by the happening of the perils insured against may be so affected as to produce a damage, detriment, or prejudice to the person insuring". Ownership, or title, to the insured asset is not required under this test.

== See also ==
- List of Supreme Court of Canada cases
