= Fletcher v. Atex, Inc. =

- Court: United States Court of Appeals for the Second Circuit
- Full case name: Marianne E. Fletcher, et al. v. Atex, Inc., et al.
- Argued: May 26, 1995
- Decided: October 5, 1995
- Citations: 68 F.3d 1451; Prod. Liab. Rep. (CCH) ¶ 14,358

Court membership
- Judges sitting: Amalya Lyle Kearse, Guido Calabresi, José A. Cabranes

Case opinions
- Majority: Cabranes, joined by a unanimous court

Fletcher v. Atex, Inc., 68 F.3d 1451 (2d Cir. 1995), is a veil piercing case by Judge José A. Cabranes in corporation law.

== Facts ==
Plaintiffs filed a suit against Atex and Kodak alleging that repetitive stress injuries were caused by the use of Atex branded keyboards. Atex, although undergoing a renaming, was a wholly owned subsidiary of Kodak until the sale of most of its assets. Atex's promotional material referred to Atex as a division of Kodak. The district court found in favor of Kodak on summary judgment and the plaintiff's appealed to the Second Circuit.

== Judgment ==
The Second Circuit affirmed the District Court's finding in favor of Kodak. The court found that since Atex was incorporated in Delaware, that Delaware laws applied. The court then considered both an alter ego theory and an agency liability theory that could impute responsibility for Atex's actions to Kodak. The court also briefly discussed and rejected the possibility of Kodak being the apparent manufacturer or of concerted tortious action.

=== Alter Ego Theory ===
The court stated that to successfully move forward on an alter ego theory to impute liability for Atex's actions to Kodak, the plaintiff would have to show that both that the two companies operated as a "single economic entity" and that there would have to be some unfairness or inequity involved in not piercing the veil. The court emphasized that while fraud could be used to pierce the veil, it was not an essential element.

In considering whether the two companies formed a "single economic entity" the court could consider: if the subsidiary was adequately capitalized, if it was solvent, if it paid dividends, how the records were kept, how the officers function, whether corporate formalities were observed, whether funds were taken away for use by the parent company, and if it operated as a facade.

The court ruled that these factors did not lead to a conclusion that it should pierce the veil, noting that using a cash management system and a limited overlap in the board of directors between the two companies was insufficient.

=== Agency Theory ===
The plaintiffs relied on statements made in Atex's literature that would indicate it was a division of Kodak and used the word agent directly. However, the court rejected this theory noting the lack of evidence that Kodak itself had authorized those statements.

== See also ==
- US corporate law
- Berkey v. Third Avenue Railway Co.
