= Ord v Belhaven Pubs Ltd =

UK company law case

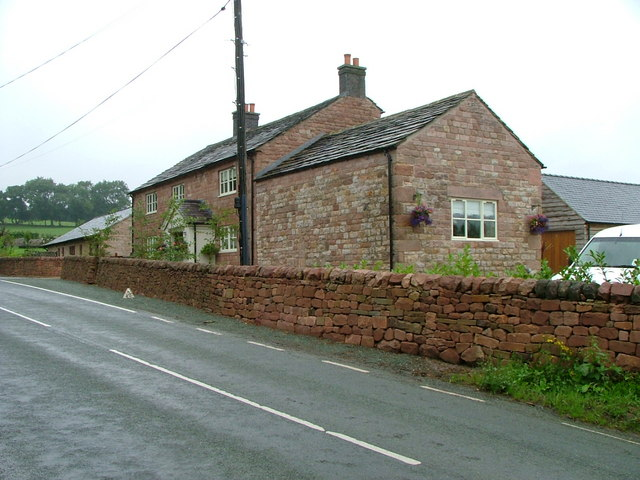
- Court: Court of Appeal of England and Wales
- Citation: [1998] 2 BCLC 447

Keywords
- Lifting the corporate veil

Ord v Belhaven Pubs Ltd [1998] 2 BCLC 447 is a UK company law case concerning piercing the corporate veil.

== Facts ==
Mr and Mrs Ord ran the Fox Inn in Stamford, Lincolnshire. They were in an ongoing dispute with the freehold owner, Belhaven Pubs Ltd, for misrepresentation about the level of profitability of the pub. However Belhaven Pubs Ltd was part of a company group structure that had been reorganised, and had no assets left. Mr and Mrs Ord requested that a company with money, Ascott Holdings Ltd, be substituted for Belhaven Pubs Ltd to enforce the judgment. At first instance the judge granted this order. Belhaven Pubs Ltd appealed.

== Judgment ==
The Court of Appeal overturned the judgement and held that the reorganisation was a legitimate one, and not done to avoid an existing obligation. Hobhouse LJ argued that the reorganisation, even though it resulted in Belhaven Pubs Ltd having no further assets, was done as part of a response to the group's financial crisis. There was no ulterior motive.

Hobhouse LJ also held, specifically, that the earlier case of Creasey v Breachwood Motors Ltd was wrong.

== See also ==
- UK company law
- Lifting the corporate veil
