= Corporate group =

Collection of parent and subsidiary corporations

A corporate group, company group or business group, also formally known as a group of companies, is a collection of parent and subsidiary corporations that function as a single economic entity through a common source of control. These types of groups are often managed by an account manager. The concept of a group is frequently used in tax law and accounting and (less frequently) company law to attribute the rights and duties of one member of the group to another or the whole. If the corporations are engaged in entirely different businesses, the group is called a conglomerate. The forming of corporate groups usually involves consolidation via mergers and acquisitions, although the group concept focuses on the instances in which the merged and acquired corporate entities remain in existence rather than the instances in which they are dissolved by the parent. The group may be owned by a holding company which may have no actual operations.

== Legal independence ==
A corporate group is composed of companies. The general rule is that a company is a separate legal entity from its shareholders, that is the shareholder's liability for the subsidiary's debts is limited to the value of the shares, and the shareholders cannot be required to perform the company's obligations.

However, some jurisdictions create exceptions to this rule. For example, Germany has created affiliated enterprise law which provides situations in which one company is liable for the debts of another company. In New Zealand, the Companies Act provides that the assets of related companies may be pooled to pay the creditors if one of the companies is liquidated. However, the circumstances in which this power will be exercised are very narrow.

- Berkey v Third Avenue Railway

== Economic dependence ==
- Concern (business)
- DHN v Tower Hamlets LBC
- EU Seventh Company Law Directive 83/349, on group accounts
- EU Draft Ninth Company Law Directive, on corporate groups

== Law ==
=== Accounting ===
- EU Seventh Company Law Directive 83/349, on group accounts

=== Civil law ===
- Salomon v Salomon
- Berkey v Third Avenue Railway
- Adams v Cape Industries plc

=== Codetermination ===
- Mitbestimmungsgesetz

== Definition ==
Leff defines "business group" as a group of companies that does business in different markets under common administrative or financial control whose members are linked by relations of interpersonal trust on the basis of similar personal ethnic or commercial background. One method of defining a group is as a cluster of legally distinct firms with a managerial relationship. The relationship between the firms in a group may be formal or informal. A keiretsu is one type of business group. A concern is another.

Douma and Schreuder (2013) distinguish "horizontal" and "vertical business groups" as follows: 'Business groups can be horizontal or vertical as far as their structure is concerned. In a horizontal business group there is no central holding company – the group companies are connected through various formal or informal ties, including reciprocal shareholding. Thus, a horizontal business group is a rather loose confederation of firms. Coordination between them is achieved mainly by mutual adjustment and standardization of norms. Mitsubishi is a well-known example of a horizontal business group as are many other keiretsu. Chinese groups exhibit similar features. Horizontal business groups are also referred to as "associative business groups". A vertical business group is a group of companies controlled, but not entirely owned, by a single investor. Vertical groups are often organized as pyramids of companies controlled by the main investor through a holding company. A unique feature of pyramidal holdings is that it allows the main investor to exert control with a limited amount of capital. Korean chaebols, Indian business houses and most European business groups are vertical in character. Vertical business groups are also referred to as "hierarchical business groups".

Encarnation refers to Indian business houses, emphasizing multiple forms of ties among group members. Powell and Smith-Doerr state that a business group is a network of firms that regularly collaborate over a long time period. Granovetter argues that business groups refers to an intermediate level of binding, excluding on the one hand a set of firms bound merely by short-term alliances and on the other a set of firms legally consolidated into a single unit. Williamson claims that business groups lie between markets and hierarchies; this is further worked out by Douma & Schreuder. Khanna and Rivkin suggest that business groups are typically not legal constructs though some regulatory bodies have attempted to codify a definition. In the United Arab Emirates, a business group can also be known as a trade association. Typical examples are Adidas Group or Icelandair Group.

== See also ==
- Business alliance
- Chaebol
- Concern
- Conglomerate
- Holding company
- Keiretsu
- Subsidiary
- Zaibatsu
- Multinational corporation
