= Macaura v Northern Assurance Co Ltd =

1925 English tort case law

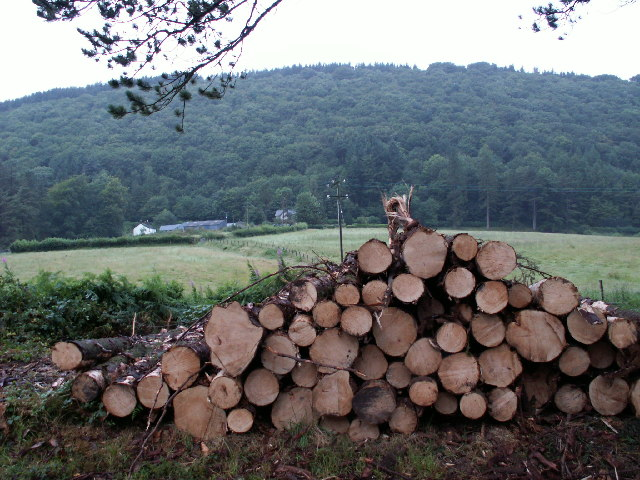
- Court: House of Lords
- Decided: 3 April 1925
- Citation: [1925] AC 619

Court membership
- Judges sitting: Lord Sumner, Lord Buckmaster, Wrenbury, Atkinson and Phillimore concurred.

Macaura v Northern Assurance Co Ltd [1925] AC 619 appeared before the House of Lords concerning the principle of lifting the corporate veil. Unusually, the request to do so was in this case made by the corporation's owner.

== Facts ==
Mr Macaura owned the Killymoon estate in County Tyrone, Northern Ireland. He sold the timber there to Irish Canadian Sawmills Ltd for 42,000 fully paid up £1 shares, making him the whole owner (with nominees). Mr Macaura was also an unsecured creditor for £19,000. He got insurance policies - but in his own name, not the company's - with Northern Assurance covering for fire. Two weeks later, there was a fire. Northern Assurance refused to pay up because the timber was owned by the company, and that because the company was a separate legal entity, it did not need to pay Mr Macaura any money.

== Judgment ==
The House of Lords held insurers were not liable on the contract, since the timber that perished in the fire did not belong to Mr Macaura, who held the insurance policy. Lord Buckmaster gave the first judgment, holding in favour of the insurance companies. Lord Atkinson concurred. Lord Sumner concurred and said the following.

My Lords, this appeal relates to an insurance on goods against loss by fire. It is clear that the appellant had no insurable interest in the timber described. It was not his. It belonged to the Irish Canadian Sawmills Ltd, of Skibbereen, Co. Cork. He had no lien or security over it and, though it lay on his land by his permission, he had no responsibility to its owner for its safety, nor was it there under any contract that enabled him to hold it for his debt. He owned almost all the shares in the company, and the company owed him a good deal of money, but, neither as creditor nor as shareholder, could he insure the company's assets. The debt was not exposed to fire nor were the shares, and the fact that he was virtually the company's only creditor, while the timber was its only asset, seems to me to make no difference. He stood in no "legal or equitable relation to" the timber at all. He had no "concern in" the subject insured. His relation was to the company, not to its goods, and after the fire he was directly prejudiced by the paucity of the company's assets, not by the fire.

Lord Wrenbury and Phillimore concurred.

== See also ==
- Kosmopoulos v Constitution Insurance Co of Canada [1987] 1 SCR 2
- Attorney General of Belize v Belize Telecom Ltd
- Lee v Lee’s Air Farming [1961] AC 12
