= Le front de libération populaire =

Le front de libération populaire (FLP) was created in 1968 as a Quebec secessionist party by former members of the Rassemblement pour l'Indépendance Nationale (RIN) and ended in 1970. The main things that the FLP did was the Campaign against An Act to promote the French language in Québec (Bill 63) and Opération McGill.
