= Concern (business) =

Type of business group common in Europe

A concern (German: Konzern [kɔnˈtsɛʁn]) is a type of business group common in Europe, particularly in Germany. It results from the merger of several legally independent companies into a single economic entity under unified management.

A concern consists of a controlling enterprise and one or more controlled enterprises. The relationship between the controlling and controlled enterprises is based on the actual commercial and management relationships, unlike parent and subsidiary companies which are related by share ownership and voting rights.

Outside of professionals, the term Group, also mistakenly within the meaning of large companies – regardless of its corporate structure – is understood.

The Group concept has antitrust relevance: the so-called Group privilege, the privilege of the consolidated Group companies involved, means that in itself, prohibition included practices that do not violate German or European Commission (EC) antitrust law. On the other hand, the Group concept in the Banking Act is to the formation of a borrower unit to access large credit facilities.

== Types ==
The 1965 Aktiengesetz, literally "stock law", but commonly known in English as the German Stock Corporation Act, defines a concern as: "one dominant and one or more dependent companies, together under the unified leadership of the ruling company".

The Aktiengesetz applies only to any Aktiengesellschaften (AG; literally "stock company"; singular Aktiengesellschaft), which are analogous to public companies in the English-speaking world. An Aktiengesellschaft differs from a Gesellschaft mit beschränkter Haftung (GmbH), which is analogous to limited liability companies in other countries. A GmbH is regulated under the Gesetz betreffend die Gesellschaften mit beschränkter Haftung of 1892 (GmbH-Gesetz; literally "law concerning companies with limited liability").

Three different kinds of concern are identified under Aktiengesetz: the contractual concern, the factual concern, and the flat concern.

=== Contractual ===
In this form of concern, the controlling enterprise and controlled enterprise enter into a control agreement – wherein the controlling enterprise can obtain management powers over the controlled enterprise, sometimes amounting to complete control – and/or a profit transfer agreement. These powers may be used in a way that is detrimental to the subsidiary, provided that they are in the interests of the concern and do not damage the legal separateness of the subsidiary.

In return, the controlling enterprise is liable to compensate the controlled enterprise for all deficits of the controlled enterprise during the term of the agreement.

=== Factual ===
In this form of concern, the controlling enterprise exerts a controlling influence on the controlled enterprise, but there is no formal control or profit transfer agreement. If one company owns a majority in another company, then the first company is deemed to exert a controlling influence. The parent company is then liable for any damage which results from the interference of the parent company in the subsidiary, which is judged on a case-by-case basis. This kind of concern is more difficult to establish and so is more uncommon.

=== Flat ===
In this version, there is no parent company, instead a number of legally separate companies are subject to common direction.

== Other forms ==
To apply the law of concern to concerns involving German limited liability companies, the German courts have created the qualified de facto concern, beginning in the 1970s. This form of concern applies only in parent subsidiary relationships. If the parent is shown to have a long-standing and pervasive control over the affairs of the subsidiary, then there is a presumption that the parent was not acting in the best interests of the subsidiary. If the parent is unable to displace this presumption, then the parent is liable for all the obligations of the subsidiary.

This type of concern was limited by Germany’s Federal Court of Justice in 2002 to only apply where the control is such that the subsidiary will inevitably collapse or become insolvent, on the basis that the parent has abused the separate legal personality of the subsidiary.

== Conglomerate ==
(inorganic groups) A conglomerate consists of enterprises from different businesses. Unlike the concern, the companies in a conglomerate have a limited business relationship with each other.

== See also ==
- Consolidated financial statement
- Variable interest entity
- Zaibatsu
