= Bank of Tokyo Ltd v Karoon =

1987 British conflict of laws case

- Court: Court of Appeal of England and Wales
- Decided: 24 May 1984
- Citations: [1987] AC 45n, [1986] 3 WLR 414, [1986] 3 All ER 468

Case history
- Prior actions: (7 November 1983) Unreported, Bingham J

Court membership
- Judges sitting: Ackner LJ and Robert Goff LJ

Keywords
- Breach of confidence; Foreign jurisdictions; Injunctions; Interpleader proceedings

Bank of Tokyo Ltd v Karoon [1987] AC 45 is a conflict of laws case, which also relates to UK company law and piercing the corporate veil.

== Facts ==
The Bank of Tokyo was a Japanese Bank operating in London and a wholly owned subsidiary of the Bank of Tokyo Trust Co, a New York corporation. Mr Karoon, an Iranian employee of the Iranian Maritime Co had personal accounts with both banks. He left Iran and transferred his money from the New York to the London bank. In February 1980 the London bank was notified that Mr Karoon was sentenced to prison by the Iranian government, and requested his assets be sent to the Iranian government. Mr Karoon asked the bank to transfer his accounts to another bank. The bank, unsure of what to do, applied for an interpleader summons and the money was eventually paid into court. Mr Karoon sued the New York bank claiming breach of the duty of confidentiality in disclosing information to the London bank, and the London bank sought to restrain him taking proceedings in the American courts.

== Judgment ==
Robert Goff LJ held that it was for American law, as the forum conveniens, to determine whether the Bank of Tokyo Trust Co had committed a breach of contract, observing that it was a separate corporation from Bank of Tokyo. There were no reasons of public policy which required an injunction.

In the course of his judgment Robert Goff LJ observed,

Counsel suggested beguilingly that it would be technical for us to distinguish between parent company and subsidiary in this context; economically, he said, they were one. But we are concerned not with economics but with law. The distinction between the two is, in law, fundamental and cannot here be abridged.

== See also ==
- UK company law
- Lifting the corporate veil
