= Tunstall v Steigmann =

- Court: Court of Appeal
- Decided: 23 March 1962
- Citations: [Plaint No. R. 1237.], [1962] 2 QB 593
- Transcript: Court of Appeal ruling

Keywords
- Separate legal personality, alter ego

Tunstall v Steigmann [1962] 2 QB 593 is a British company law case concerning, inter alia, the separate legal personality of an incorporated company.

== Facts ==
Mrs Tunstall was the tenant of a shop owned by Mrs Steigmann, with the shop being held by Mrs Tunstall on lease for three years from 19 April 1958. Mrs Steigmann also owned an adjacent shop where she carried on a pork butchery business. On 12 April 1961, Mrs Steigmann served a notice on Mrs Tunstall under Part II of the Landlord and Tenant Act 1954; the notice stated that Mrs Steigmann would oppose an application by Mrs Tunstall for a new tenancy on the ground that she intended to occupy the holding leased out to Mrs Tunstall for the purpose of carrying on her butchery business therein and that the existing tenancy was to be terminated on 19 October 1961. On 11 August 1961, Mrs Tunstall applied to the York County Court for a grant of a new lease of five year's duration pursuant to Part II of the Landlord and Tenant Act. Section 30(1)(g) of the Landlord and Tenant Act prevented landlords who wished to terminate tenancies from opposing a tenant's application for a new tenancy unless there were exceptional circumstances, with these including the landlord wishing to occupy the premises themselves to carry on a new business; accordingly, Mrs Steigmann filed a notice of her intention to oppose the grant of a new tenancy on those grounds.

The case was heard on 26 September 1961. In the meantime, Mrs Steigmann promoted a limited company for the purpose of carrying on her butchery business. Mrs Tunstall claimed that the business was now being carried on by the company rather than Mrs Steigmann herself and, because the company was a separate legal person, Mrs Steigmann did not have the right to repossession under the statute.

== Judgement ==
=== County Court ===
At the hearing of a preliminary point as to whether Mrs Steigmann intended to occupy the premises within the meaning of section 30(1)(g), it was agreed that the business was to be carried on by the company formed by Mrs Steigmann, that she held all the shares in the company with the exception of two which were in the possession of her nominees, and that she had the sole control of the company and its business. McKee J ruled that it was Mrs Steigmann's intention to carry on the business notwithstanding that it was now owned by the limited company and dismissed Mrs Tunstall's application for a new tenancy, saying that:

If [Mrs Steigmann] were going to carry on the business, clearly she would have good ground for succeeding but she is proposing to carry on the business through a company. The Court of Appeal in Pegler v. Craven made it clear that a company could be a person's alter ego. Where a company is in common sense merely the private individual who has complete control of it, that person is going to occupy for the purposes of their business and their business is really the running of the company.

=== Court of Appeal ===
Tunstall subsequently appealed to the Court of Appeal, with judgements read on 23 March 1962. Ormerod LJ began by analysing Evershed MR's statement in Pegler v Craven that "in some circumstances it could be said that a company in actual occupation was but the alter ego of the tenant" and that while such a conclusion might be arrived at in some cases, it could not be arrived at in Pegler for the company could not be said to be a mere alter ego of the applicant in that case:

[McKee J] appears to have relied upon the first part of that passage as indicating that in a case such as the one under consideration, the court will hold that it is the intention of the landlord or tenant as the case may be to carry on the business notwithstanding that the business has been assigned to a limited company, if the company is so completely under the control of the landlord or tenant respectively as to amount to the alter ego of that party. The passage which has been cited does not appear to me to go anything like as far as that. It is true that the possibility was being considered by the Master of the Rolls in that part of his judgment, and I think it is true to say that he was giving favourable consideration to the contention that the company might be the alter ego of the party in question, but it is clear, I think, from the passage, that the question was being left open by him, and in any event, it was not relevant to the decision of the question then before the court, and for my part I cannot agree that the view taken by the county court judge is the correct one.

He then turned to Mrs Steigmann's reliance on section 30(1)(g) of the Landlord and Tenant Act, noting that the only question to be considered was whether she intended to occupy the shop for the purposes of carrying on a business therein:

I have formed the view that in these circumstances it cannot be said that it is the intention of the landlord to carry on the business. It was decided in Salomon v. Salomon & Co. Ltd. that a company and the individual or individuals forming a company were separate legal entities, however complete the control might be by one or more of those individuals over the company. That is the whole principle of the formation of limited liability companies and it would be contrary to the scheme of the Companies Acts to depart from that principle. It has been contended in this case that [...] any person in the street would say that the business was the landlord's business, notwithstanding that it was being carried on by a limited company, and that in those circumstances it should be held that the provisions of paragraph (g), to which I have referred, should be considered to be satisfied. That, I think, is a dangerous doctrine. It may be that in practice [Mrs Steigmann] will continue to carry on the business as it has been carried on in the past when she was undoubtedly the proprietor of it [...] that she will derive a profit or otherwise from the business as she has done in the past. But the fact remains that she has disposed of her business to a limited company. It is the limited company which will carry on the business in the future, and if she acts as the manager of the business, it is for and on behalf of the limited company. In my judgment the fact that she holds virtually the whole of the shares in the limited company and has complete control of its affairs makes no difference to this proposition. [...] It is to be assumed that [Mrs Steigmann] assigned her business to the limited company for some good reason which she considered to be of an advantage to her. She cannot say that in a case of this kind she is entitled to take the benefit of any advantages that the formation of a company gave to her, without at the same time accepting the liabilities arising therefrom. She cannot say that she is carrying on the business or intends to carry on the business in the sense intended by paragraph (g) of the subsection and at the same time say that her liability is limited as provided by the Companies Acts.

In the course of the case, Ormerod LJ had asked if there was "anything to merit a departure from the main principle of Salomon v. Salomon & Co. Ltd.", with the judges subsequently being referred to cases such as Daimler Co. Ltd. v. Continental Tyre & Rubber (Great Britain) Ltd.:

That was a case of a company registered in this country, the whole of the shares of which were owned by enemy aliens, and it was decided that to trade with that company would be trading with the enemy under the then current legislation. In addition it was submitted that in applying the Rent Restriction Acts the court has always looked to the reality of the transaction and would not allow the purpose of the Acts to be defeated by the use of the Companies Acts. In support of this contention we were referred to Samrose Properties Ltd. v. Gibbard. Whilst it may be argued that in the above circumstances the courts have departed from a strict observance of the principle laid down in Salomon v. Salomon & Co. Ltd., it is true to say that any departure, if indeed any of the instances given can be treated as a departure, has been made to deal with special circumstances when a limited company might well be a facade concealing the real facts. Counsel was unable to point to any special circumstances in this case other than that the landlord has complete control of the company. In my judgment that is not enough. I see no reason to depart from well-established principles, and I would allow [Mrs Tunstall's] appeal.

Wilmer LJ and Danckwerts LJ concurred.

== Later developments ==
The Landlord and Tenant Act 1954 was amended by the Law of Property Act 1969 to clarify that when a landlord incorporates the property, it is treated as an alter ego.

== See also ==
- Lennard's Carrying Co Ltd v Asiatic Petroleum Co Ltd (1915)
- UK company law
