= Walkovszky v. Carlton =

New York Court of Appeals case

- Court: New York Court of Appeals
- Full case name: John Walkovszky, Respondent, v. William Carlton, Appellant, et al., Defendants
- Decided: November 29, 1966
- Citations: 18 N.Y.2d 414, 223 N.E.2d 6, 276 N.Y.S.2d 585 (1966)

Case history
- Prior action: 262 N.Y.2d 334
- Subsequent action: 287 N.Y.2d 546; 244 N.E.2d 55

Court membership
- Judges sitting: Stanley Fuld; Kenneth Keating

Case opinions
- Fuld: Reversed lower court.

Walkovszky v. Carlton, 223 N.E.2d 6 (N.Y. 1966), is a United States corporate law decision on the conditions under which Courts may pierce the corporate veil. A cab company had shielded itself from liability by incorporating each cab as its own corporation. The New York Court of Appeals refused to pierce the veil on account of undercapitalization alone.

== Facts ==
Carlton owned and ran a cab company in which he set up ten separate corporations, each holding the minimum amount of liability insurance of $10,000 per cab, in which he was the primary stockholder. Though the companies were separate legal entities, they were run by Carlton in unison. Each corporation owned one or two cabs. When one of his cabs negligently injured a pedestrian, Walkovszky, the pedestrian could only sue one of the subsidiary companies that contained a very limited amount of assets.

The issue before the Court was whether Carlton could be personally liable for the injury to a pedestrian on account of attempting to "defraud the members of the general public".

== Judgment ==
Judge Fuld, for the majority, held that Carlton was not personally liable. If the corporation was run purely for personal ends and not for the benefit of the corporation then there would be a basis for making the shareholder liable, however, this is not the case here. A corporation with a minimum amount of assets is a valid one and cannot be ignored.

The order of the Appellate Division should be reversed, with costs in this court and in the Appellate Division, the certified question answered in the negative and the order of the Supreme Court, Richmond County, reinstated, with leave to serve an amended complaint.

=== Dissent ===
Judge Keating, in dissent, said that Carlton should be liable. The corporation was intentionally undercapitalized in order to avoid liability, which is a clear abuse of the corporate entity. The interests of the state in protection of victims of negligence is a sufficient basis to pierce the corporate veil. He held that "a participating shareholder of a corporation vested with a public interest, organized with capital insufficient to meet liabilities which are certain to arise in the ordinary course of the corporation's business, may be held personally responsible for such liabilities." This "insufficient capitalization" rationale has not been widely persuasive with courts, perhaps due to a fear that it would chill entrepreneurial activity.

== Significance ==
Not long after the decision, the state increased the minimum amount of liability insurance required by a corporation. Also, plaintiff Walkovszky amended his suit claiming Carlton had done business as an individual.

== See also ==
- US corporate law
- Piercing the corporate veil#United States
- Berkey v. Third Avenue Railway Co 244 N.Y. 602, 155 N.E. 914 (1927)
