= Creasey v Breachwood Motors Ltd =

- Citation: [1993] BCLC 480

Creasey v Breachwood Motors Ltd [1993] BCLC 480 is a UK company law case concerning piercing the corporate veil.

== Facts ==
Mr Creasey was dismissed from his post of general manager at Breachwood Welwyn Ltd. He claimed that this constituted wrongful dismissal, in breach of his employment contract. However, before he could claim, Breachwood Welwyn Ltd ceased trading, and all assets were moved to Breachwood Motors Ltd, which continued the business. Other creditors were paid off, but no money was left for Mr Creasey's claim, which was not defended and held successful in an order for £53,835 against Breachwood Welwyn Ltd. Mr Creasey applied for enforcement of the judgment against Breachwood Motors Ltd and was successful. Breachwood Motors Ltd appealed.

== Judgment ==
Mr Richard Southwell lifted the corporate veil to enforce Mr Creasey's wrongful dismissal claim. He held that the directors of Breachwood Motors Ltd, who had also been directors of Breachwood Welwyn Ltd, had themselves deliberately ignored the separate legal personality of the companies by transferring assets between the companies without regard to their duties as directors and shareholders.

== Significance ==
The case was heavily doubted by the Court of Appeal in Ord v Belhaven Pubs Ltd.

== See also ==
- UK company law
- Lifting the corporate veil
