= Perpetual Real Estate Services, Inc. v. Michaelson Properties, Inc. =

- Court: United States Court of Appeals for the Fourth Circuit
- Argued: July 7, 1992
- Decided: September 8, 1992
- Citations: 974 F.2d 545; 61 U.S.L.W. 2178

Case history
- Prior history: 775 F. Supp. 893 (E.D. Va. 1991)

Court membership
- Judges sitting: J. Harvie Wilkinson III, Paul V. Niemeyer, J. Michael Luttig

Case opinions
- Majority: Wilkinson, joined by a unanimous court

Keywords
- Legal person, limited liability

Perpetual Real Estate Services, Inc. v. Michaelson Properties, Inc. 974 F.2d 545 (4th Cir. 1992), is a US corporate law case, concerning piercing the corporate veil.

== Facts ==
Aaron Michaelson (Aaron) formed Michaelson Properties, Inc. (Properties) in 1981 to invest in real estate joint ventures. Aaron was the sole shareholder and the corporation's president.

Properties entered a joint venture with Perpetual Real Estate (Perpetual), forming a partnership called "Arlington Apartment Associates" (AAA) to build condominiums. During building, AAA needed additional financing; Properties could not contribute its share, so Perpetual loaned it $1.05 million and obtained a personal guarantee from Aaron.

The condominiums were poorly built, and several purchasers successfully sued AAA for $950,000. Perpetual paid the judgments on behalf of AAA and then sought recovery from Properties. Properties lacked sufficient funds and went bankrupt, prompting Perpetual to sue Aaron personally.

Aaron argued that Properties was a separate legal entity and that pierce the corporate veil was inappropriate. However, the jury ruled that the veil could be pierced and held Aaron personally liable. Aaron appealed.

== Judgment ==
Wilkinson J noted that Virginia law had assiduously upheld the "vital economic policy" of respecting a corporation as a separate legal entity, since it underpinned the operation of vast enterprises. He emphasised that the veil would only be lifted where a defendant exercises "undue domination and control" and uses the corporation as "a device or sham... to disguise wrongs, obscure fraud, or conceal crime." He said the description of the law which the jury had heard was in a "rather soggy state" and emphasised that it was not enough that "an injustice or fundamental unfairness" would be perpetrated. Wilkinson continued:

The fact that limited liability might yield results that seem "unfair" to jurors unfamiliar with the function of the corporate form cannot provide a basis for piercing the veil. Virginia law requires proof of some legal wrong before it undermines this basic assumption of corporate existence.

Because there was no evidence that Aaron was attempting to defraud anybody, the veil could not be lifted. There was no "unfair siphoning of funds" when Aaron paid himself a dividend, because distribution was entirely foreseeable when the money was given, and the distribution happened well before any suit was filed. The fact that Aaron had given personal guarantees strengthened the corporate veil presumption, because the transactions recognised it existed.

== Cited cases ==
- Cheatle v. Rudd's Swimming Pool Supply Co., 234 Ca. 207, 360 S.E.2d 828 (1987)
- Beale v. Kappa Alpha Order, 192 Ca. 382, 64 S.E2d 789 (1951)
- Anderson v. Abbott, 321 U.S. 349 (1944)
- Dwitt Truck Brokers, Inc. v. W. Ray Flemming Fruit Co., 540 F.2d 681 (4th Cir. 1976)
- Cunningham v. Rendezvous, Inc. 699 F.2d 676 (4th Cir. 1983)
- United States v. Jon-T Chemicals, Inc. 768 F.2d 686 (5th Cir. 1985)
- United Paperworkers Int'l Union v. Penntech Papers, Inc., 439 F. Supp. 610 (D. Me. 1977)
- Aronson v. Price 644, N.E.2d 864 (Ind. 1964) a plaintiff brought his car for repair to "Corbett's Body Shop" which did not indicate its corporate status.
- Interocean Shipping Co. v. National Shipping & Trading Corp., 523 F.2d 527 (2d Cir. 1975), conduct akin to fraud required to pierce the veil in contract cases

== See also ==
- United States corporate law
