= Kinney Shoe Corp v. Polan =

- Court: United States Court of Appeals for the Fourth Circuit
- Full case name: Kinney Shoe Corporation v. Lincoln M. Polan
- Argued: March 6, 1991
- Decided: July 17, 1991
- Citation: 939 F.2d 209

Court membership
- Judges sitting: Kenneth Keller Hall, Robert F. Chapman, Hiram Hamilton Ward (M.D.N.C.)

Case opinions
- Majority: Chapman

Keywords
- Piercing the corporate veil

Kinney Shoe Corp v. Polan, 939 F.2d 209 (4th Cir. 1991), is a US corporate law case, concerning piercing the corporate veil.

== Facts ==
Kinney Shoe Corp sued Mr Lincoln M Polan to pay money outstanding on a sub-lease by the "Industrial Realty Company". Polan wholly owned "Industrial", but had never held any corporate meetings or elected officers.

The question is whether Kinney could pursue Mr Polan for the debt.

== Judgment ==
Chapman J quoted from Sanders v Roselawn Memorial Gardens, Inc. that the "fiction" of separate legal personality,

should be disregarded when it is urged with an intent not within its reason and purpose, and in such a way that its retention would produce injustices or inequitable consequences.

It emphasized that each case should be decided on its facts, and pointed to a number of relevant factors.

- that Industrial was not adequately capitalized (no capital had been paid in)
- no corporate formalities, such as taking minutes or electing officers, had been observed
- it appeared that the company was deliberately used to carry out transactions to benefit another of Mr Polan's companies, which had assets but would be shielded from liability

He concluded by saying,

This corporation was no more than a shell - a transparent shell. When nothing is invested in the corporation, the corporation provides no protection to its owner; nothing in, nothing out, no protection. If Polan wishes the protection of a corporation to limit his liability, he must follow the simple formalities of maintaining the corporation. This he failed to do, and he may not relieve his circumstances by saying Kinney should have known better.

== See also ==
- United States corporate law
- Texas Industries Industries Inc v DuPuy, 227 So. 2d 265 (La. Ct. App. 1969) "Inadequate capitalization is not of itself a badge of fraud... The general rule is that an individual may incorporate his business for the sole purpose of escaping individual liability for the corporate debts."
