= Berkey v. Third Avenue Railway Co. =

1926 US legal case

Berkey v. Third Avenue Railway Co
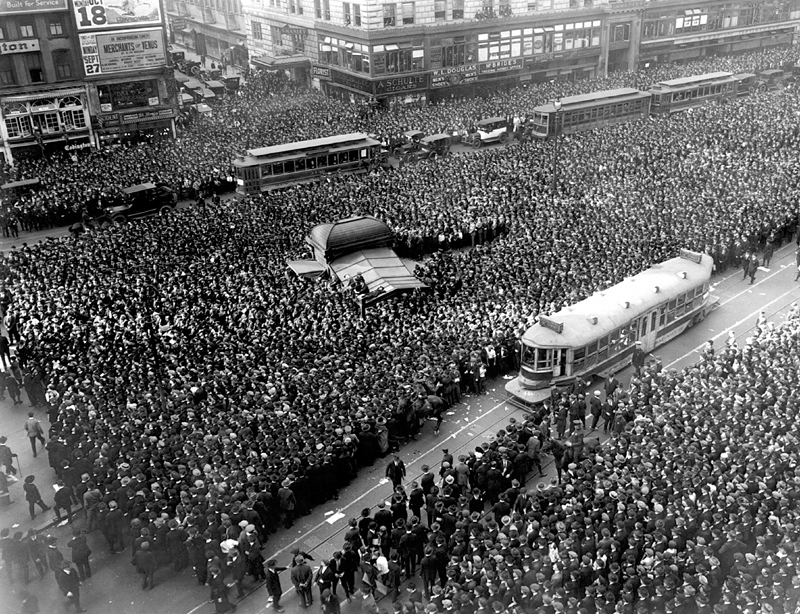
- Court: New York Court of Appeal
- Citation: 244 N.Y. 602, 155 N.E. 914 (1927)

Case opinions
- Judge Benjamin N. Cardozo

Keywords
- Piercing the corporate veil, tort victims

Berkey v. Third Avenue Railway Co 244 N.Y. 84 (1926) is a classic veil piercing case by Judge Benjamin N. Cardozo in United States corporate law.

== Facts ==
Minnie Berkey had an accident on a tram line operated by the Forty-second Street, etc., Railway Company. She suffered personal injury. The Third Avenue Railway owned it, along with another two corporations with street railways on different routes. Third Avenue not only owned nearly all the stock, the board of directors and executive officers were also nearly the same. Ms Berkey sued the parent, Third Avenue Railway Co, to compensate her for personal injury.

However, it was contrary to New York law at the time for one street railway company to assign its franchise to another without the Railway Commission's approval. So it was argued that a transfer in any liabilities from one to the other was an illegal contract, and therefore transfer of tort liability for Ms Berkey's personal injury was also illegal.

== Judgment ==
The New York Court of Appeals held that the Third Avenue Railway Co was not liable for the debts of the subsidiary. The domination of the parent company over the subsidiary had to be complete for the parent company to be treated as liable for the debts of the subsidiary. It was needed that the subsidiary be merely the alter ego of the parent, or that the subsidiary be thinly capitalized, so as to perpetrate a fraud on the creditors.

Cardozo J said the following.

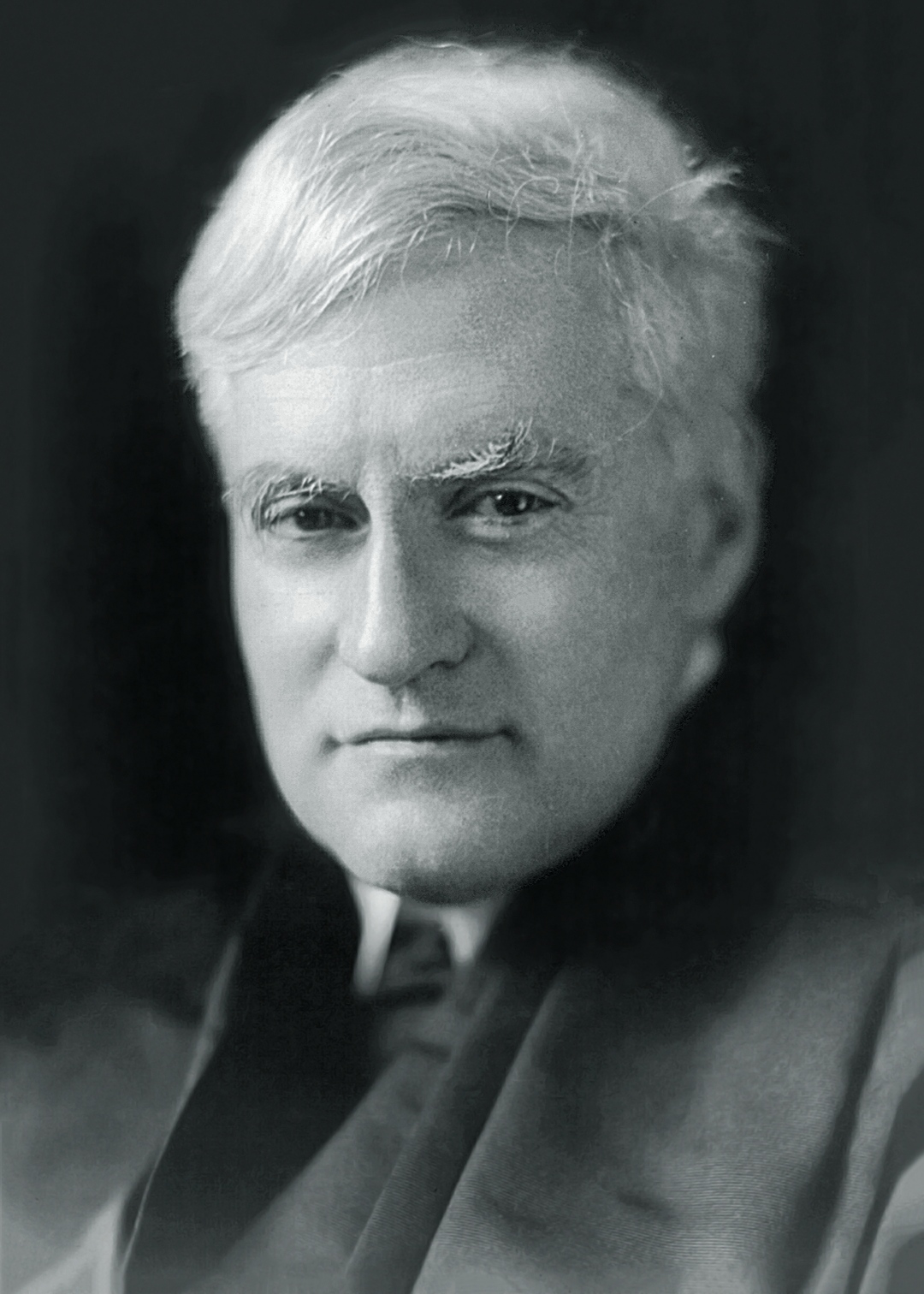
Cardozo J held that in this instance it was contrary to statutory intent to ignore separate personality of the tram company.

The plaintiff's theory of the action requires us to assume the existence of a contract between the defendant on the one side and the Forty-second Street Company on the other... we cannot bring ourselves to believe that an agreement, criminal in conception and effect, may be inferred from conduct or circumstances so indefinite and equivocal... We do not mean that a corporation which has sent its cars with its own men over the route of another corporation may take advantage of the fact that its conduct in so doing is illegal to escape liability for the misconduct of its servant. A defendant in such circumstances is liable for the tort, however illegitimate the business, just as much as it would be if its board of directors were to order a motorman to run a traveler down. We do mean, however, that an intention to operate a route in violation of a penal statute is not to be inferred... This being so, there is no need to choose between the Federal doctrine and our own, if indeed when they are understood, there is any difference between them.

...

The whole problem of the relation between parent and subsidiary corporations is one that is still enveloped in the mists of metaphor. Metaphors in law are to be narrowly watched, for starting as devices to liberate thought, they end often by enslaving it. We say at times that the corporate entity will be ignored when the parent corporation operates a business through a subsidiary which is characterized as an 'alias' or a 'dummy.' All this is well enough if the picturesqueness of the epithets does not lead us to forget that the essential term to be defined is the act of operation. Dominion may be so complete, interference so obtrusive, that by the general rules of agency the parent will be a principal and the subsidiary an agent. Where control is less than this, we are remitted to the tests of honesty and justice (Ballantine, Parent & Subsidiary Corporations, 14 Calif. Law Review, 12, 18, 19, 20). The logical consistency of a juridical conception will indeed be sacrificed at times when the sacrifice is essential to the end that some accepted public policy may be defended or upheld. This is so, for illustration, though agency in any proper sense is lacking, where the attempted separation between parent and subsidiary will work a fraud upon the law (Chicago, etc., Ry. Co. v. Minn. Civic Assn., 247 U.S. 490, 62 L. Ed. 1229, 38 S. Ct. 553; United States v. Reading Company, 253 U.S. 26, 61, 63, 64 L. Ed. 760, 40 S. Ct. 425). At such times unity is ascribed to parts which, at least for many purposes, retain an independent life, for the reason that only thus can we overcome a perversion of the privilege to do business in a corporate form. We find in the case at hand neither agency on the one hand, nor on the other abuse to be corrected by the implication of a merger. On the contrary, merger might beget more abuses than if stifled. Statutes carefully framed for the protection, not merely of creditors, but of all who travel upon railroads, forbid the confusion of liabilities by extending operation over one route to operation over another. In such circumstances, we thwart the public policy of the state instead of defending or upholding it, when we ignore the separation between subsidiary and parent, and treat the two as one.

== See also ==
- US corporate law
- Walkovszky v. Carlton, 223 N.E.2d 6 (NY 1966)
- Salomon v A Salomon & Co Ltd
- Adams v Cape Industries plc, two UK law cases which took a much more restricted approach
- DHN Food Distributors Ltd v Tower Hamlets LBC, a less restrictive UK case by Lord Denning MR.
