= Scottish Co-op Wholesale Society Ltd v Meyer =

Scottish Co-operative Wholesale Society Ltd v Meyer
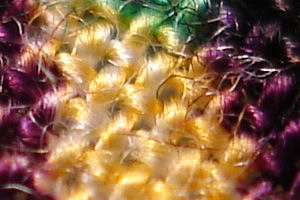
- Court: House of Lords
- Citation: [1959] AC 324, [1958] 3 All ER 66; [1958] 3 WLR 404, 102 Sol Jo 617, 1958 SC (HL) 40

Court membership
- Judges sitting: Viscount Simonds, Lord Morton of Henryton, Lord Keith of Avonholm and Lord Denning

Keywords
- Unfair prejudice, oppression, companies

Scottish Co-operative Wholesale Society Ltd v Meyer [1959] AC 324 is a UK company law case concerned with the predecessor of the unfair prejudice provision, an action for "oppression" under section 210 of the Companies Act 1948 (now section 994 of the Companies Act 2006).

The judgement remains a leading precedent for the clear statement that the duty of care of a director is to the company itself, and not to the interests of particular shareholders. It also illustrates the reluctance of the English courts to "admit the reality of interrelated companies acting in any way other than as a number of separate entities tied together by their relationship as significant shareholders in each other".

== Facts ==
The Scottish Co-operative Wholesale Society Ltd. set up a new company called "Scottish Textile & Manufacturing Co Ltd" with Dr Meyer and Mr Lucas. They manufactured rayon cloth. Back then, one required state licensing and to get a license experienced managers were needed. Dr Meyer and Mr Lucas were the managing directors, with some shares, while the Scottish Co-op held the majority of the company's shares and appointed the other three directors to the board. These three were also directors of the Scottish Co-op itself. In 1952, the licensing system was ended by the government. So Scottish Co-op used its majority of votes to transfer all the business to a branch of the Co-op. It also cut off the supplies of raw materials. The company could not continue, no profits were made and the share value crashed. Mr Meyer and Mr Lucas felt oppressed and petitioned for relief under section 210 of the Companies Act 1948. Lord Denning said,

"My Lords, I had myself prepared a summary of the material facts in this case but, in view of the comprehensive statement by my noble and learned friend, Lord Keith of Avonholm, I will not burden your Lordships with what I had written."

== Judgment ==
The House of Lords held that the conduct of the majority was indeed oppressive, and ordered that Dr Meyer and Mr Lucas' shares be bought at a price that was fair. Lord Denning's speech continued.

I would only say that I am sorry that the events of 1952 were excluded as irrelevant. Dr. Meyer and Mr. Lucas from the very beginning put those events in the forefront of their complaints. They did so in the first letter of their solicitors dated February 19, 1953, and in the original petition lodged on July 14, 1953. The burden of their complaints was that, when there was a recession in 1952 in the rayon trade, they - Dr. Meyer and Mr. Lucas - tried, on behalf of the textile company, to develop trade in other goods: particularly in the export of woollen materials to Germany (where they had valuable trade connections) and in a large export order for £60,000: but that they were thwarted in their efforts by the actions of two of the nominee directors, who tried to get the trade for the Scottish Co-operative Wholesale Society itself. Whether these complaints be true or not your Lordships cannot know - because these allegations were excluded from probation. But your Lordships have, I think, sufficient material to decide the case on the other facts which were proved.

The complaints which were established were, I think, these: The co-operative society set up a competing business. It established its own merchant converting department, engaged in the rayon trade itself, and quoted more favourable terms to its own department than it did to the textile company. It is said that the co-operative society did this with intent to injure the textile company - to depress the value of its shares so that the co-operative society could get them cheap - but I would not myself go as far as this. It seems to me that the co-operative society all the time was seeking to promote its own interests. It was ready in 1946 to enlist the co-operation of Dr. Meyer and Mr. Lucas when they were useful to it - so as to get an introduction into the rayon trade - but it was ready to throw them over when they were no longer useful. By which I mean that it was ready to withdraw all support from them. That was, I think, the state of mind of the co-operative society right from the moment in November, 1951, when Dr. Meyer and Mr. Lucas refused to realign the shares at par. At that time the rayon trade was in a recession and Dr. Meyer and Mr. Lucas were not of so much use to the society as they had been. By the time the rayon trade revived, the controls were off and the co-operative society was able to engage in rayon production itself - and it had no further need of Dr. Meyer and Mr. Lucas or of the textile company. It had its own department for rayon. So the textile company could go to the wall. It had "served its purpose" - or rather the purpose of the co-operative society - and could be let go into liquidation. The co-operative society had not the voting power to put it into voluntary liquidation. But liquidation might come about by sheer inanition. So it came about that, when Dr. Meyer and Mr. Lucas in January, 1953, offered to sell their shares to the co-operative society at a price to be negotiated (mentioning 96s.), the co-operative society refused "at the present time." The co-operative society thought, perhaps, that if they waited, sooner or later liquidation would come about, or that terms of purchase would be arranged later more favourable to the co-operative society than paying 96s. a share.

Such being "the matters complained of" by Dr. Meyer and Mr. Lucas, it is said: "Those are all complaints about the conduct of the co-operative society. How do they touch the real issue - the manner in which the affairs of the textile company were being conducted?" The answer is, I think, by their impact on the nominee directors. It must be remembered that we are here concerned with the manner in which the affairs of the textile company were being conducted. That is, with the conduct of those in control of its affairs. They may be some of the directors themselves, or, behind them, a group of shareholders who nominate those directors or whose interests those directors serve. If those persons - the nominee directors or the shareholders behind them - conduct the affairs of the company in a manner oppressive to the other shareholders, the court can intervene to bring an end to the oppression.

What, then, is the position of the nominee directors here? Under the articles of association of the textile company the co-operative society was entitled to nominate three out of the five directors, and it did so. It nominated three of its own directors and they held office, as the articles said, "as nominees" of the co-operative society. These three were therefore at one and the same time directors of the co-operative society - being three out of 12 of that company - and also directors of the textile company - three out of five there. So long as the interests of all concerned were in harmony, there was no difficulty. The nominee directors could do their duty by both companies without embarrassment. But, so soon as the interests of the two companies were in conflict, the nominee directors were placed in an impossible position. Thus, when the realignment of shareholding was under discussion, the duty of the three directors to the textile company was to get the best possible price for any new issue of its shares (see per Lord Wright in Lowry v. Consolidated African Selection Trust Ltd. [1940] A.C. 648, 679; 56 T.L.R. 735; [1940] 2 All E.R. 545.), whereas their duty to the co-operative society was to obtain the new shares at the lowest possible price - at par, if they could. Again, when the co-operative society determined to set up its own rayon department, competing with the business of the textile company, the duty of the three directors to the textile company was to do their best to promote its business and to act with complete good faith towards it; and in consequence not to disclose their knowledge of its affairs to a competitor, and not even to work for a competitor, when to do so might operate to the disadvantage of the textile company (see Hivac Ltd. v. Park Royal Scientific Instruments Ltd. [1946] Ch. 169; 62 T.L.R. 231; [1946] 1 All E.R. 350.), whereas they were under the self-same duties to the co-operative society. It is plain that, in the circumstances, these three gentlemen could not do their duty by both companies, and they did not do so. They put their duty to the co-operative society above their duty to the textile company in this sense, at least, that they did nothing to defend the interests of the textile company against the conduct of the co-operative society. They probably thought that "as nominees" of the co-operative society their first duty was to the co-operative society. In this they were wrong. By subordinating the interests of the textile company to those of the co-operative society, they conducted the affairs of the textile company in a manner oppressive to the other shareholders.

It is said that these three directors were at most only guilty of inaction - of doing nothing to protect the textile company. But the affairs of a company can, in my opinion, be conducted oppressively by the directors doing nothing to defend its interests when they ought to do something - just as they can conduct its affairs oppressively by doing something injurious to its interests when they ought not to do it.

The question was asked: What could these directors have done? They could, I suggest, at least on behalf of the textile company, have protested against the conduct of the co-operative society. They could have protested against the setting up of a competing business. But then it was said: What good would that have done? Any protest by them would be sure to have been unavailing, seeing that they were in a minority on the board of the co-operative society. The answer is that no one knows whether it would have done any good. They never did protest. and it does not come well from their mouths to say it would have done no good, when they never put it to the test. See the decision of this House in Morison, Pollexfen & Blair Ltd. v. Walton, (1909) May 10 (unreported); see [1915] 1 K.B. 90. as described by Scrutton L.J. in Coldman v. Hill [1919] 1 K.B. 443, 457; 35 T.L.R. 146. Even if they had protested, it might have been a formal gesture, ostensibly correct, but not to be taken seriously.

Your Lordships were referred to Bell v. Lever Brothers Ltd., [1932] A.C. 161, 195; 48 T.L.R. 133. where Lord Blanesburgh said that a director of one company was at liberty to become a director also of a rival company. That may have been so at that time. But it is at the risk now of an application under section 210 if he subordinates the interests of the one company to those of the other.

So I would hold that the affairs of the textile company were being conducted in a manner oppressive to Dr. Meyer and Mr. Lucas. The crucial date is, I think, the date on which the petition was lodged - July 14, 1953. If Dr. Meyer and Mr. Lucas had at that time lodged a petition to wind up the company compulsorily, the petition would undoubtedly have been granted. The facts would plainly justify such an order on the ground that it was "just and equitable " that the company should be wound up: see In re Yenidje Tobacco Co. Ltd. [1916] 2 Ch. 426; 32 T.L.R. 709. But such an order would unfairly prejudice Dr. Meyer and Mr. Lucas because they would only recover the break-up value of their shares. So instead of petitioning for a winding-up order, they seek to invoke the new remedy given by section 210 of the Companies Act, 1948. But what is the appropriate remedy? It was said that section 210 only applies as an alternative to winding up and that an order can only be made under section 210 if the company is fit to be kept alive: whereas in this case the business of the company was virtually at an end when the petition was lodged, and there was no point in keeping it alive. If the co-operative society were ordered, in these circumstances, to buy the shares of Dr. Meyer and Mr. Lucas, this would amount, it was said, to an award of damages for past misconduct - which is not the remedy envisaged by section 210.

Now, I quite agree that the words of the section do suggest that the legislature had in mind some remedy whereby the company, instead of being wound up, might continue to operate. But it would be wrong to infer therefrom that the remedy under section 210 is limited to cases where the company is still in active business. The object of the remedy is to bring "to an end the matters complained of," that is, the oppression, and this can be done even though the business of the company has been brought to a standstill. If a remedy is available when the oppression is so moderate that it only inflicts wounds on the company, whilst leaving it active, so also it should be available when the oppression is so great as to put the company out of action altogether. Even though the oppressor by his oppression brings down the whole edifice - destroying the value of his own shares with those of everyone else - the injured shareholders have, I think, a remedy under section 210.

One of the most useful orders mentioned in the section - which will enable the court to do justice to the injured shareholders - is to order the oppressor to buy their shares at a fair price: and a fair price would be, I think, the value which the shares would have had at the date of the petition, if there had been no oppression. Once the oppressor has bought the shares, the company can survive. It can continue to operate. That is a matter for him. It is, no doubt, true that an order of this kind gives to the oppressed shareholders what is in effect money compensation for the injury done to them: but I see no objection to this. The section gives a large discretion to the court and it is well exercised in making an oppressor make compensation to those who have suffered at his hands.

True it is that in this, as in other respects, your Lordships are giving a liberal interpretation to section 210. But it is a new section designed to suppress an acknowledged mischief. When it comes before this House for the first time it is, I believe, in accordance with long precedent - and particularly with the resolution of all the judges in Heydon's case (1584) 3 Co.Rep. 7a. - that your Lordships should give such construction as shall advance the remedy and that is what your Lordships do today.

== See also ==
- UK company law
