= DHN Food Distributors Ltd v Tower Hamlets LBC =

DHN Food Ltd v Tower Hamlets LBC
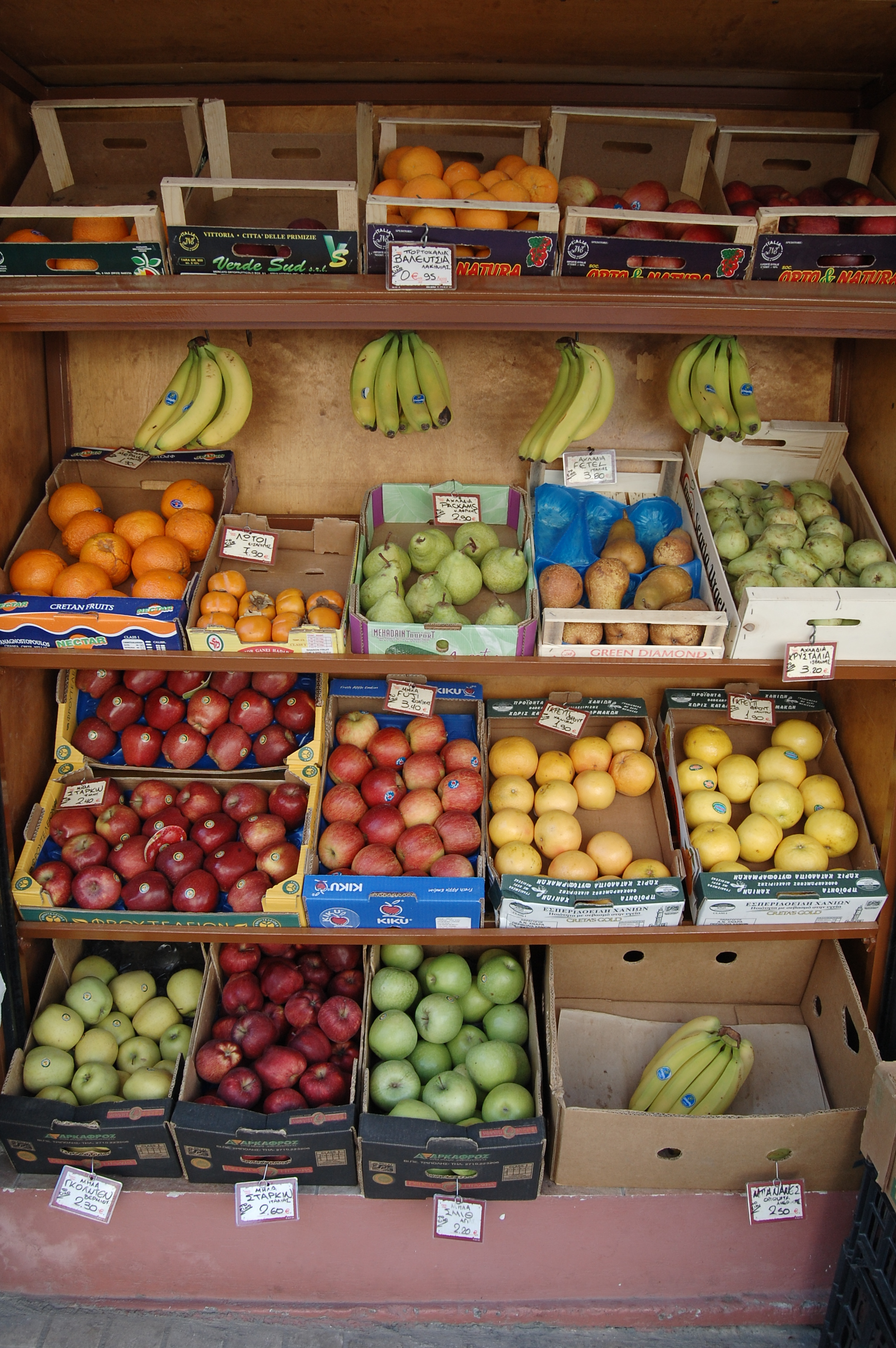
- Court: Court of Appeal
- Decided: 4 March 1976
- Citation: [1976] 1 WLR 852

Court membership
- Judges sitting: Lord Denning MR, Goff LJ and Shaw LJ

Keywords
- lifting the veil

DHN Food Distributors Ltd v Tower Hamlets London Borough Council [1976] 1 WLR 852 is a UK company law case where, on the basis that a company should be compensated for loss of its business under a compulsory acquisition order, a group was recognised as a single economic entity. It stands as a liberal example of when UK courts may lift the veil of incorporation of a company.

The decision was, however, doubted in Woolfson v Strathclyde Regional Council and qualified in Adams v Cape Industries plc.

== Facts ==
DHN imported groceries and provision and had a cash-and-carry grocery business. Its premises were owned by its subsidiary which was called Bronze. It had a warehouse in Malmesbury Road, in Bow, the East End of London. Bronze's directors were DHN's. Bronze had no business and the only asset were the premises, of which DHN was the licensee. Another wholly owned subsidiary, called DHN Food Transport Ltd, owned the vehicles. In 1970 Tower Hamlets London Borough Council compulsorily acquired the premises to build houses. As a result, DHN had to close down. Compensation was already paid to Bronze, one and a half times the land value. DHN could only get compensation too if it had more than a license interest. The Lands Tribunal held no further compensation was payable.

== Judgment ==
The Court of Appeal held that DHN and Bronze were part of a single economic entity. Therefore, as if DHN had owned the land itself, it was entitled to compensation for the loss of business.

Lord Denning MR's judgment went as follows.

This case might be called the “Three in one.” Three companies in one. Alternatively, the “One in three.” One group of three companies. For the moment I will speak of it as “the firm.”

...Compensation under the statute is to be made for the cost of the land and for any other relevant losses contingent upon the owner's losses of land: see section 5 (2) and (6) of the Land Compensation Act 1961.

If the firm and its property had all been in one ownership, it would have been entitled to compensation under those two heads: first, the value of the land, which has been assessed in excess of £360,000. Second, compensation for disturbance in having its business closed down. The figure has not yet been assessed. But the firm and its property were not in one ownership. It was owned by three companies. The business was owned by the parent company, D.H.N. Food Distributors Ltd. The land was owned at the time of acquisition by a subsidiary, called Bronze Investments Ltd. The vehicles were owned by another subsidiary, D.H.N. Food Transport Ltd. The parent company D.H.N. held all the shares both in the Bronze company and in the Transport company. The directors were the same in all three companies. As the result of the business having to be closed down, all the three companies are in liquidation.

The question is: what is the effect of the firm being in truth the three companies? The acquiring authority say that the owners of the land were Bronze Investments Ltd., and that company are entitled to the value of the land £360,000. They have actually been paid it. But the acquiring authority say that that company are not entitled to compensation for disturbance because they were not disturbed at all. The authority admit that D.H.N. (who ran the business) and the Transport subsidiary (who owned the vehicles) were greatly disturbed in their business. But the acquiring authority say that those two companies are not entitled to any compensation at all, not even for disturbance, because they had no interest in the land, legal or equitable. They say that in 1970 D.H.N. were only licensees of Bronze, the subsidiary which owned the land: and D.H.N. being licensees only, with no interest in the land, their only claim was under section 20 (1) of the Compulsory Purchase Act 1965. That section says that if a person has no greater interest than a tenant from year to year in the land, then he is only entitled to compensation for that lesser interest. Seeing that a licensee can be turned out on short notice, the compensation payable to D.H.N. would be negligible.

The strange thing about the case is this, that the acquiring authority admit that at any time from February 1970, during the local inquiry and afterwards (right up to the time in October 1970 when the council gave notice to treat) the people running these three companies could have put their house in order so as to make the claim impregnable. All they had to do was to take a very simple step. Being in control of all three companies, they could have arranged for Bronze to convey the land to D.H.N. No stamp duty would be payable because it would be exempt under section 42 of the Finance Act 1930 . And D.H.N., being the owners, could also claim compensation for disturbance. So at any time up to October 30, 1970, this group of three companies could have put themselves in an unassailable position to claim not only the value of the land but also compensation for disturbance. But that was not done. The acquiring authority say that, by failing to do it, the group have missed the boat. They are left behind on the quay because of the technical provisions of our company law whereby each of the three companies is in law a separate person. Each of its interests must be considered separately. D.H.N. had no interest in the land. It was only a licensee. So it cannot claim compensation for disturbance.

The President of the Lands Tribunal was asked to determine preliminary points of law. He held that D.H.N. had no interest in the land such as to entitle them to any compensation for disturbance beyond the amount allowed by section 20 of the Act of 1965, which is negligible. D.H.N. appeal to this court.

We were told by Mr. Eyre, who argued the case for Tower Hamlets, that a similar contention has succeeded in other cases before the Lands Tribunal. So much so that, in order to overcome the technical point, it seems that it is the regular thing for the legal advisers of a group of companies to do the necessary conveyancing before the notice to treat. But that in this case the group did not put their house in order in time. And so, he submits, there is no claim for disturbance.

Mr. Dobry, for D.H.N., took three points before us: first, that they had an equitable interest in the land; second and alternatively, that they had an irrevocable licence; third, that we should lift the corporate veil and treat D.H.N. as the owners. And that, in one or other of these three capacities, they were entitled to compensation for disturbance.

First, equitable interest. This depends on the conveyancing transactions by which the land was acquired. They were very complicated. In 1963 the vendors of the factory and warehouse agreed to sell it to the group for £115,000. The group had not the money to pay the price. So they got the help of the Palestine British Bank. This bank provided the £115,000. In 1964 the conveyance was made to Bronze Investments Ltd. which was a wholly owned subsidiary of the bank. Two years later, in 1966, D.H.N. (having borrowed money elsewhere) acquired all the shares in Bronze (so that Bronze then became a wholly owned subsidiary of D.H.N.) and D.H.N. repaid the £115,000 provided by the bank. So the legal title remained in Bronze, but D.H.N. had the benefit of the property D.H.N. occupied the premises from the time when they were first acquired in 1964 until the local authority entered under their compulsory powers.

It is said that, on those facts, in the first place Bronze held the legal title on a resulting trust for the bank (which provided the purchase money): and that afterwards, when D.H.N. repaid the purchase money to the bank D.H.N. acquired the equitable interest of the bank. That may be right but the President of the Lands Tribunal rejected it, and I am not prepared to say that he was wrong.

Second, irrevocable licence. It may be that, on those facts, the bank lent the £115,000 to Bronze with which Bronze bought the property. If so, the bank would not have acquired any equitable interest. They would only be creditors of Bronze. But when D.H.N. repaid the £115,000 to the bank, they simply stood in the shoes of the bank as creditors of Bronze. In that case Mr. Eyre submits that D.H.N. have no legal or equitable interest in the property but are only licensees.

Now I am prepared to allow that D.H.N. were licensees of Bronze. Mr. Eyre suggested that they were bare licensees, but I do not think so. Bronze was a wholly owned subsidiary of D.H.N. Both companies had common directors running the companies. It is plain to me that thereafter Bronze could not determine the licence so as to ruin D.H.N. The directors of Bronze could not turn out themselves as directors of D.H.N. They would be in breach of their duties to both companies if they did so: see Scottish Co-operative Wholesale Society Ltd v Meyer [1959] AC 324, 366–367. In the circumstances, I think the licence was virtually an irrevocable licence. D.H.N. was the parent company holding all the share in Bronze. In those circumstances D.H.N. were in a position to carry on their business on these premises unless and until, in their own interest, D.H.N. no longer wished to continue to stay there. It was equivalent to a contract between the two companies whereby Bronze granted an irrevocable licence to D.H.N. to carry on their business on the premises In this situation Mr. Dobry cited to us Binions v Evans [1972] Ch 359, to which I would add Bannister v Bannister [1948] 2 All ER 133 and Siew Soon Wah v Yong Tong Hong [1973] AC 836 . Those cases show that a contractual licence (under which a person has the right to occupy premises indefinitely) gives rise to a constructive trust, under which th legal owner is not allowed to turn out the licensee. So, here. This irrevocable licence gave to D.H.N. a sufficient interest in the land to qualify them for compensation for disturbance.

Third, lifting the corporate veil. A further very interesting point was raised by Mr. Dobry on company law. We all know that in many respects a group of companies are treated together for the purpose of general accounts, balance sheet, and profit and loss account. They are treated as one concern. Professor Gower in Modern Company Law, 3rd ed. (1969), p. 216 says:

“there is evidence of a general tendency to ignore the separate legal entities of various companies within a group, and to look instead at the economic entity of the whole group.”

This is especially the case when a parent company owns all the shares of the subsidiaries — so much so that it can control every movement of the subsidiaries. These subsidiaries are bound hand and foot to the parent company and must do just what the parent company says. A striking instance is the decision of the House of Lords in Harold Holdsworth & Co (Wakefield) Ltd v Caddies [1955] 1 WLR 352. So here. This group is virtually the same as a partnership in which all the three companies are partners. They should not be treated separately so as to be defeated on a technical point. They should not be deprived of the compensation which should justly be payable for disturbance. The three companies should, for present purposes, be treated as one, and the parent company D.H.N. should be treated as that one. So D.H.N. are entitled to claim compensation accordingly. It was not necessary for them to go through a conveyancing device to get it.

I realise that the President of the Lands Tribunal, in view of previous cases, felt it necessary to decide as he did. But now that the matter has been fully discussed in this court, we must decide differently from him. These companies as a group are entitled to compensation not only for the value of the land, but also compensation for disturbance. I would allow the appeal accordingly.

Goff LJ concurred and read his judgment.

The book-keeping adopted by the claimants was in many respects unhappy and in some, in my view, wholly inaccurate. The result is that this case has come to appear complicated and difficult, whereas in truth, in my view, it is simple and straightforward.

In my judgment the appeal succeeds on each of three entirely separate grounds. First, assuming, contrary to the view which I hold, that D.H.N. were licensees only, and that subject thereto the whole legal and equitable interest in the business premises was vested in Bronze, still it seems to me that one must imply, from the business association between these three companies and the fact (which is uncontroverted) that D.H.N. paid all the money that was paid, that there was an agreement that that licence should not be revoked during the continuation of the business. In my judgment, therefore, compensation for disturbance must be assessed on the basis that D.H.N. had an irrevocable or indefinite licence.

Mr. Eyre, who argued this case with great skill on behalf of the acquiring authority, relied on Horn v Sunderland Corporation [1941] 2 KB 26, and he said that compensation for disturbance is only part of the price which is being paid for the land compulsorily acquired, and you cannot acquire a licence even though it be an irrevocable one.

But it seems to me that that is answered, if not by section 5 (2) of the Compulsory Purchase Act 1965 then certainly by Binions v Evans [1972] Ch. 359, in this court, and I cite from the judgment of Lord Denning MR, at p. 367:

“Seeing that the defendant has no legal estate or interest in the land, the question is what right has she? At any rate, she has a contractual right to reside in the house for the remainder of her life or as long as she pleases to stay. I know that in the agreement it is described as a tenancy: but that does not matter. The question is: What is it in reality? To my mind it is a licence, and no tenancy. It is a privilege which is personal to her. On all the modern cases, which are legion, it ranks as a contractual licence, and not a tenancy. What is the status of such a licence as this? There are a number of cases in the books in which a similar right has been given. They show that a right to occupy for life, arising by contract, gives to the occupier an equitable interest in the land: just as it does when it arises under a settlement: see In re Carne's Settled Estates [1899] 1 Ch 324 and in Re Boyer's Settled Estates [1916] 2 Ch 404. The courts of equity will not allow the landlord to turn the occupier out in breach of the contract: see Foster v Robinson [1951] 1 KB 149, 156; nor will they allow a purchaser to turn her out if he bought with knowledge of her right …”

Secondly, on the footing that that is not in itself sufficient, still, in my judgment, this is a case in which one is entitled to look at the realities of the situation and to pierce the corporate veil. I wish to safeguard myself by saying that so far as this ground is concerned, I am relying on the facts of this particular case. I would not at this juncture accept that in every case where one has a group of companies one is entitled to pierce the veil, but in this case the two subsidiaries were both wholly owned; further, they had no separate business operations whatsoever; thirdly, in my judgment, the nature of the question involved is highly relevant, namely, whether the owners of this business have been disturbed in their possession and enjoyment of it.

I find support for this view in a number of cases from which I would make a few brief citations, first from Harold Holdsworth & Co (Wakefield) Ltd v Caddies [1955] 1 WLR 352, where Lord Reid said, at p. 367:

“It was argued that the subsidiary companies were separate legal entities each under the control of its own board of directors, that in law the board of the appellant company could not assign any duties to anyone in relation to the management of the subsidiary companies and that therefore the agreement cannot be construed as entitling them to assign any such duties to the respondent.

My Lords, in my judgment this is too technical an argument. This is an agreement in re mercatoria and it must be construed in light of the facts and realities of the situation. The appellant company owned the whole share capital of British Textile Manufacturing Co. Ltd. and under the agreement of 1947 the directors of this company were to be the nominees of the appellants. So, in fact, the appellants could control the internal management of their subsidiary companies, and, in the unlikely event of there being any difficulty, it was only necessary to go through formal procedure in order to make the decision of the appellants' board fully effective.”

That particular passage is, I think, especially cogent having regard to the fact that Mr. Eyre was constrained to admit that in this case, if they had thought of it soon enough, D.H.N. could, as it were, by moving the pieces on their chess board, have put themselves in a position in which the question would have been wholly unarguable.

I also refer to Scottish Co-operative Wholesale Society Ltd v Meyer [1959] AC 324. That was a case under section 210 of the Companies Act 1948, and Viscount Simonds said, at p. 343.

“I do not think that my own views could be stated better than in the late Lord President Cooper's words on the first hearing in this case. ‘In my view,’ he said, ‘the section warrants the court in looking at the business realities of a situation and does not confine them to a narrow legalistic view.’”

My third citation is from the judgment of Danckwerts LJ in Merchandise Transport Ltd v British Transport Commission [1962] 2 QB 173, 206–207 where he said:

“[the cases] show that where the character of a company, or the nature of the persons who control it, is a relevant feature the court will go behind the mere status of the company as a legal entity, and will consider who are the persons as shareholders or even as agents who direct and control the activities of a company which is incapable of doing anything without human assistance.”

The third ground, which I place last because it is longest, but perhaps ought to come first, is that in my judgment, in truth, D.H.N. were the equitable owners of the property. In order to resolve this matter, it will be necessary for me to refer in some detail to the facts.

When the three original companies had amalgamated by causing D.H.N. to be incorporated and assigning their businesses to that company, it was necessary to obtain outside financial assistance so that suitable new premises could be acquired. Short-term finance was arranged with the Palestine British Bank (later called the Israel British Bank), and the terms of the arrangements which were made are set out in a letter dated December 2, 1963. It was written by D.H.N.'s accountants to the managing director of the bank and confirmed by him by endorsed written note the next day. It is headed in the matter of the three original companies, but I think it is clear it must be treated as embodying an agreement between the bank and D.H.N.

It provided that the bank should buy the property and sell it to the group, meaning, as I have said, D.H.N., for £120,000, of which £20,000 was to be paid on exchange of contracts between the bank and the group. The group was to have one year after completion of the bank's purchase in which to complete the subcontract and were to pay interest on the balance of the purchase money £100,000, in the meantime at 12 per cent. There was also a provision giving the bank an option to acquire an equity interest in the group, but nothing turns on that as it was not exercised. Finally, the letter said:

“It is understood that the group will be permitted full and exclusive use and enjoyment of the said property as from the date of your own completion with the vendors.”

The premises were bought for £115,000 and transferred to Bronze, a then wholly owned and inactive subsidiary of the bank. Bronze were duly registered at Her Majesty's Land Registry on March 12, 1964, as proprietors of the freehold interest. On May 27, 1964, they entered into a contract (which I will call the resale contract) whereby they agreed to sell to D.H.N. for £120,000, and D.H.N. duly paid £20,000 as a deposit to the bank as stakeholders.

Pursuant to the original agreement, the resale contract provided for completion on January 6, 1965, being in fact one year after the transfer to Bronze. A caution to protect the resale contract was duly entered on the register, and D.H.N. were at once let into possession and began to carry on their new business, which flourished extremely well. So far, all in accordance with the letter of December 2.

It seems that D.H.N. needed more time to arrange permanent finance, and, therefore, by a further agreement of December 14, 1964, made between Bronze and D.H.N., in consideration of a further payment of £1,150 which D.H. N. made to Bronze, the date for completion of the resale contract was postponed to January 6, 1966, and interest was reduced from 12 per cent to 10 per cent.

By December 1965 D.H.N. had managed to borrow £110,000 from Credit for Industry Ltd., but at this stage, possibly taking up a suggestion which the bank itself had made on December 6, 1963, it was decided that in order to save a second lot of stamp duty on the conveyance by Bronze to D.H.N., the latter should buy the shares in Bronze from the bank.

Those proposals were set out in a letter dated December 17, 1965, from D.H.N.'s solicitors to D.H.N.'s accountants. That letter reads as follows:

“Bronze Investments Ltd. bought the property in January 1964 for the sum of £115,000. D.H.N. entered into a contract to buy the property from Bronze Investments Ltd. for £120,000. It is now intended that, in order to obviate stamp duties so far as possible, D.H.N. should buy the issued share capital of Bronze Investments Ltd. and the shareholders of Bronze Investments Ltd. are agreeable in principle.

They have suggested that since Bronze Investments Ltd. is selling for £5,000 more than it paid, the consideration for the shares of Bronze Investments Ltd. should be £5,000. They state that Bronze Investments Ltd. is indebted to Israel British Bank Ltd. for the amount of the purchase money, namely £115,000.

D.H.N. have paid a deposit of £20,000 and are, as you know, obtaining a mortgage advance of £100,000 from Credit for Industry Ltd. It is suggested, therefore, that of the £20,000 deposit now held by Israel British Bank Ltd., £5,000 should be applied towards the purchase of the shares of Bronze Investments Ltd. and the balance towards discharging the indebtedness of that company to Israel British Bank Ltd. The mortgage advance coming from Credit for Industry Ltd. would then be applied entirely towards discharging the remaining part of the moneys due from Bronze Investments Ltd.”

Then on February 8, 1966, there was a further agreement between the bank and D.H.N. under which, first, the bank agreed to sell the shares in Bronze to D.H.N., not for £5,000, but for £3,597 5s How this particular figure was arrived at I do not know, but no matter. Secondly, D.H.N. undertook that on completion, Bronze would pay £116,402 15s to the bank, making a total, with the £3,597 5s, of £120,000. The sum of £116,402 15s was, in clause 6 of the agreement, described as “being the amount loaned to the company” — that is Bronze — “by the vendor” — that is, the bank. The bank warranted and declared that on receipt of the sum, it would have no further claim against the company or the purchaser on any account whatsoever.

On the same day, February 8, 1966, D.H.N. borrowed the £110,000 from Credit for Industry Ltd., and D.H.N. and Bronze concurred to mortgage the freehold to secure repayment. It is clear from that mortgage, and is the fact, that D.H.N., not Bronze, borrowed this money, and it was utilised to pay the bank for the shares and the £116,400 odd, less credit for the £20,000, already held by the bank.

Mr. Eyre, for the acquiring authority, takes his stand on that agreement of February 8, 1966. He says it is the only, or at any rate, the most cogent, evidence of what the relevant transaction was, and he says: “There we have the bank and D.H.N. solemnly declaring and agreeing that what happened was that the bank lent the money to Bronze to enable it to purchase for its own benefit; that the relationship between the bank and Bronze was simply that of creditor and debtor; and when D.H.N. paid off the Bronze liability of £116,400 odd, that was either a voluntary payment, which gave it no rights — but that did not matter because it also bought all the shares — or was a payment which subrogated D.H.N. to the bank's rights against Bronze as a creditor.” If this was an action on that agreement, there might well be an estoppel, but it is not, and I do not see anything to prevent D.H.N. asserting, and this court accepting, if it be satisfied, that the agreement of February 8, 1966, and the letter of December 17, 1965, both misstated the position.

In my judgment, that agreement and letter are not the only, or even the most cogent, evidence of the original transaction, since we have the letter of December 2, 1963, which I have read, which is the fons et origo of the whole matter, and that clearly provided that the bank were going to be the purchasers.

Then the letter four days later is not without interest. In that letter the bank itself proposed an entirely different arrangement, namely, that D. H.N. should form a new company and mortgage the shares to the bank. That was never implemented in any shape or form, but the bank there referred to “our nominee company,” clearly Bronze, and suggested that the security should be taken in its name, plainly as nominee. That stamps the character of Bronze.

Pausing there, I would have thought the clear inference was that when the property was purchased, the bank was carrying out the original agreement of December 2/3, save only that, as it had the right to do, it caused the property to be conveyed to a nominee. If so, there was clearly a resulting trust situation and Bronze held in trust for the bank. I do not think it would be a correct inference that Bronze borrowed the money from the bank and bought the property for its own use and benefit.

Then it was argued that, if that were so, Bronze could not have entered into the resale contract because the bank would have been a necessary party, but I do not agree. There was nothing to prevent Bronze entering into that contract with the approval of its beneficiary, which it clearly had, because that was the original agreement. As in all the circumstances D.H.N. would have constructive notice of the trust, the bank would no doubt have been a necessary party to the conveyance had the contract not been rescinded; but that is purely a conveyancing matter.

Then came the admittedly important letter of December 17, and the contract of February 8, 1966, but it is to be observed that the contract is in any event inaccurate, because it did not provide what was to happen to the £20,000 which was held by the bank as stakeholders. That sum, of course, became repayable to D.H.N. when the contract was rescinded, and was no doubt used towards paying the total of £120,000 but the contract should have dealt with this.

Much more seriously, however, on Mr. Eyre's hypothesis, that contract was wrong in substance. If Bronze had borrowed the money to buy the property. It borrowed £115,000 and no more, and that was the sum which fell to be repaid, not £116,402 15s Even if the bank had chosen for some reason or other to give credit against the loan for the purchase price of the shares, the £3,597 5s would have fallen to be deducted from £115,000. not £120,000.

It is clear that what the parties were seeking to do was to give effect to the original agreement in a substituted form. The bank was to have the £120,000, which it would have got under the resale contract, in return for which, instead of conveying the property, it was to transfer the shares and release its equitable interest. The way in which the contract of February 8, 1966, was drawn was, of course, inconsistent with any original resulting trust in favour of the bank, but the substance of the transaction was entirely consistent with it. It went wrong at this stage, as I think, because the solicitors and accountants in the letter of December 17, 1965, failed to appreciate the true position.

Mr. Eyre argued that if D.H.N. had intended to get in an outstanding equitable interest, it would have been easy to say so. Of course it would, and, but for the mistake, no doubt that is what would have been done, but if Bronze borrowed the money, it borrowed £115,000. Why then did D.H.N. pay £120,000? I understand Mr. Eyre conceded that if one could go behind the letter of December 17, 1965, and the agreement of February 8, 1966, and if one found, as I do, an initial relationship between Bronze and the bank of trustee and cestui que trust, not debtor and creditor, the result would be that D.H.N. acquired the bank's equitable interest. Even if not conceded, it seems to me to follow. True, there was no writing, such as is required under section 53 of the Law of Property Act 1925 for the assignment of an equitable interest in land, but this was not a gift. D.H.N. were purchasers. On my hypothesis, they paid the £120,000 to acquire the whole of the bank's interest in the property, and the bank intended to dispose of it. Then D.H.N. would be entitled to call for a proper written assignment, and that would be enough, just as if they had been purchasers under an uncompleted contract to purchase the property itself. Even if clause 6 of the agreement of February 8, 1966, operated as a release to Bronze of the bank's equitable interest, it would not merge because the price had been paid by D.H.N., and Bronze would hold it on a resulting trust for D.H.N.

In my judgment, therefore, for those reasons, the claimants are right in saying that in truth Bronze held the premises in trust for D.H.N. In my judgment, therefore, the appeal succeeds on each of these three grounds.

Shaw LJ concurred with both judgments, and concluded with the following.

Why then should this relationship be ignored in a situation in which to do so does not prevent abuse but would on the contrary result in what appears to be a denial of justice? If the strict legal differentiation between the two entities of parent and subsidiary must, even on the special facts of this case, be observed, the common factors in their identities must at the lowest demonstrate that the occupation of D.H.N. would and could never be determined without the consent of D.H.N. itself. If it was a licence at will, it was at the will of the licensee, D.H.N., that the licence subsisted. Accordingly, it could have gone on for an indeterminate time; that is to say, so long as the relationship of parent and subsidiary continued, which means for practical purposes for as long as D.H.N. wished to remain in the property for the purposes of its business. The President of the Lands Tribunal took a strict legalistic view of the respective positions of the companies concerned. It appears to me that it was too strict in its application to the facts of this case, which are, as I have said, of a very special character, for it ignored the realities of the respective roles which the companies filled. I would allow the appeal.

== See also ==
- UK company law
- R&B Customs Brokers Ltd v United Dominions Trust Ltd [1988] 1 WLR 321, Dillon LJ suggests that the corporate veil could be lifted to identify a business as a consumer.
