= Harold Holdsworth & Co (Wakefield) Ltd v Caddies =

UK company law case

- Court: House of Lords
- Citation: [1955] 1 WLR 352

Keywords
- Company constitution, managing director

Harold Holdsworth & Co (Wakefield) Ltd v Caddies [1955] 1 WLR 352 is a UK company law case, concerning the proper interpretation of a company's articles. It held that someone with the title of "managing director" has no special powers, unless the articles say them expressly.

== Facts ==
Mr Holdsworth became the managing director of the textile company after a buyout. But then the parent became dissatisfied and purported to move his duties to a subsidiary. He sued for breach of contract.

== Judgment ==
Earl Jowitt held that the position of managing director did not have some special company law meaning. So the appointment clause was broad enough that if he remained any old director, there was no breach of agreement.

== See also ==
- UK company law
- Hely-Hutchinson v Brayhead Ltd [1968] 1 QB 549
