= Family Limited Partnership =

Within partnership arrangements, Family Limited Partnerships (commonly called FLPs) are frequently used to move wealth from one generation to another. Partners are either General Partners (GP) or Limited Partners (LP). One or more General Partners are responsible for managing the FLP and its assets. Limited Partners have an economic interest in the FLP, but typically lack two noteworthy rights: control and marketability. Limited Partners have no ability to control, direct, or otherwise influence the operations of the FLP. They can neither buy additional assets, nor sell existing assets, and they cannot act on the Partnership's behalf. They also substantially lack the ability to sell their interest, with one typical exception: transfers to immediate family members (spouse, siblings, and direct lineal descendants and ascendants). FLPs are partnerships limited to family members, hence the name.

FLPs are typically holding companies, acting as an entity that holds the property (business interests, real estate investments, publicly traded or privately held securities) contributed by the members.

== Benefits ==
FLPs have several benefits. They allow family members with aligned interests to pool resources, thus lowering legal, accounting, and investing costs. They allow one family member, typically the GP, to move assets to other family members (often children who are LPs), while still retaining control over the assets. Because the LPs have no rights of control, they cannot liquidate their partnership interest. The timing and amounts of distributions is the sole and exclusive prerogative of the GP. That is, a distribution cannot be made to one partner (GP or LP) unless all partners receive their pro rata portion of any disbursements.

An FLP can also be formed as a family limited liability company (FLLC), which offers legal advantages over an LP. While the GP of an FLP is personally liable for all debts and obligations of the FLP, no "member" (instead of "partner") of a FLLC is personally liable. Furthermore, in an FLLC, there are no restrictions on members participating in management, unlike the restrictions on LPs. A FLLC is often managed by a group of "managing members" or one or more "managers".

FLPs also allow for favorable tax treatment relating to the transfer of the assets, relating to the lack of control, and lack of marketability of LP interests discussed above. Taxes are paid on the fair market value of assets bought or given. Fair Market Value is the value that would be received (paid) to sell (buy) an asset between a hypothetical willing buyer and hypothetical willing seller, both acting in their own best interest and with reasonable knowledge of the relevant facts when neither is acting under compulsion.

== Example ==
Consider the following scenario: A father wishes to transfer $1,000,000 to his son. If the father hands the son the amount in cash, the father will have to pay gift tax on the full amount, as that is the fair market value of the property given. One million dollars is worth exactly one million dollars. Consider this second scenario: The father creates a FLP with himself the General Partner holding a 50% interest and also holds the Limited Partner interest of 50%. He contributes the $1,000,000 in cash, and then gives his son the 50% Limited Partner interest. The fair market value is not 50% of the $1,000,000 although at first it might seem this is the case. A hypothetical willing buyer of the 50% LP interest would not be willing to pay $500,000. This is due to the lack of control and lack of marketability. Someone getting $500,000 cash can do with it as they please. Someone with a partnership interest worth $500,000, but that can't be collected until the GP declares a distribution (which may be many years away) is not as desirable, and a hypothetical and savvy buyer would factor this into their calculation of what they are willing to pay. Similarly, this asset cannot be sold or converted, and as a result, is less desirable than an equivalent amount of cash or marketable assets.

If an appraisal firm is engaged and values the 50% LP interest at $400,000, reflecting appropriate discounts for lack of control and lack of marketability in compliance with IRS regulations, the grantor (the father) has only to pay gift tax on $400,000, saving his marginal tax rate times $100,000 ($500,000 cash value minus $400,000 fair market value). This savings would be reduced by any expenses incurred to establish the FLP (attorney and accountant fees) and also by the expenses incurred to hire a qualified appraiser to determine appropriate discounts for lack of control and lack of marketability.

== Legality ==
While FLPs are completely legal, deliberately engaging in any practice the IRS deems to be specifically undertaken to evade paying taxes is illegal. Determination of the fair market value must be performed by a qualified appraiser, typically defined as someone certified to perform such work (either by the American Society of Appraisers, the Chartered Financial Analyst Institute, or another similar organization), someone who routinely performs this type of work as a normal course of business, and in compliance with federal and state laws, as well as generally accepted appraisal standards and the Uniform Standards of the Professional Appraisal Practice (USPAP).

FLPs should be formed as long-term family investment asset vehicles. In addition to investing in marketable securities, the GP can purchase alternative investments, such as hedge fund and private equity interests. Another "alternative investment" would be an interest in a closely held business created by one of the LPs. In this way, the FLP can serve as a vehicle for encouraging family entrepreneurship. An LP (e.g. a son or daughter of the founder) could submit a business plan and request seed capital or a loan for a new venture.

Because an FLP or FLLC is a real business entity, it should be treated as one. Meetings should be held on a regular basis to review the conduct of the entity's investment business. The entity must make any distributions proportionately to all partners or members. It should never be used as the personal bank account of the founder.

== See also ==
- Discretionary trust
- Limited partnership
