= Piercing the corporate veil =

Temporary rescission of corporate personhood

Piercing the corporate veil or lifting the corporate veil is a legal decision to treat the rights or duties of a corporation as the rights or liabilities of its shareholders or other persons behind the corporation. Usually a corporation is treated as a separate legal person, which is solely responsible for the debts it incurs and the sole beneficiary of the credit it is owed. Common law countries usually uphold this principle of separate personhood, but in exceptional situations may "pierce" or "lift" the corporate veil.

A simple example would be where a businessperson has left their job as a director and has signed a contract to not compete with the company they have just left for a period of time. If they set up a company which competed with their former company, technically it would be the company and not the person competing. But it is likely a court would say that the new company was just a "sham" or a "cover" and that, as the new company is completely owned and controlled by one person, the former employee is deliberately choosing to compete, placing them in breach of that non-competing contract.

Despite the terminology used which makes it appear as though a shareholder's limited liability emanates from the view that a corporation is a separate legal entity, the reality is that the entity status of corporations has almost nothing to do with shareholder limited liability. For example, English law conferred entity status on corporations long before shareholders were afforded limited liability. Similarly, the United States' Revised Uniform Partnership Act confers entity status on partnerships, but also provides that partners are individually liable for all partnership obligations. Therefore, this shareholder limited liability emanates mainly from statute.

== Basis for limited liability ==
Corporations exist in part to shield the personal assets of shareholders from personal liability for the debts or actions of a corporation which is treated as a separate person in law. Unlike a general partnership or sole proprietorship in which the owner could be held responsible for all the debts of the company, a corporation traditionally limited the personal liability of the shareholders.

Piercing the corporate veil typically is most effective with smaller privately held business entities (close corporations) in which the corporation has a small number of shareholders, limited assets, and recognition of separateness of the corporation from its shareholders would promote fraud or an inequitable result.

There is no record of a successful piercing of the corporate veil for a publicly traded corporation because of the large number of shareholders and the extensive mandatory filings entailed in qualifying for listing on an exchange.

== Germany ==
German corporate law developed a number of theories in the early 1920s for lifting the corporate veil on the basis of "domination" by a parent company over a subsidiary. These cases have led to an encompassing codification of group law provisions in the AktG 1965 (§§ 291 – 319 AktG). By contrast, a general doctrine of piercing the veil for abuse of the legal personality of the company has never really taken hold in Germany. It was advocated in the fundamental work of Rolf Serick, but rejected by the prevailing "Normanwendungslehre". After a few early cases, the German judiciary did not go down the route of establishing shareholder liability via piercing the veil. In particular, it rejected piercing the veil on grounds of material undercapitalization several times. Today, the only remaining case of shareholder liability via piercing of the corporate veil is the inextricable commingling of the assets of the company and the shareholder ("Vermögensvermischung"). But shareholders can be held liable in tort (§ 826 BGB) in the case of an interference destroying the corporation ("existenzvernichtender Eingriff"). The corporation must not be stripped, without compensation, of funds that are required to meet its foreseeable future obligations. If these are taken away by the shareholder the corporation may claim compensation, even in an insolvency proceeding. The concept adds a solvency test element to the balance-sheet based rules of capital maintenance under §§ 30, 31 GmbHG and §§ 57, 62 AktG.

== United Kingdom ==
The corporate veil in UK company law is rarely pierced. After a series of attempts by the Court of Appeal during the late 1960s and early 1970s to establish theories based on economic reality and control, the House of Lords reasserted the orthodox approach. According to a 1990 case at the Court of Appeal, Adams v Cape Industries plc, the only true "veil piercing" may take place when a company is set up for fraudulent purposes, or where it is established to avoid an existing obligation. However, cases were rare and their justification in light of the Salomon principle remained doubtful. In VTB Capital, Lord Neuberger sympathised with rejecting the doctrine altogether, but left the issue undecided because it did not matter for the outcome. In Prest v Petrodel, a divorce case in which the matrimonial home was held by the husband's company rather than by the husband himself, the Supreme Court confirmed the existence of the doctrine in English law but narrowed its application considerably. The "fraud exception" was dismissed. According to the leading judgement by Lord Sumption, piercing the veil is a subsidiary remedy of last resort that only covers the avoidance of existing obligations ("evasion principle", as opposed to the cases of the "concealment principle" that does not give rise to a claim). On closer analysis, this part of the judgment was obiter, because the Court reached the desired outcome (attribution of the family home to the assets of the husband) by applying trust law. Nevertheless, Prest v Petrodel is generally assumed to state the current law in the UK, even though the restriction of "abuse" to evasion only can be questioned and there were statements in Prest v Petrodel that supported a broader approach. It is noteworthy that under English law, piercing the veil can never be used to make shareholders pay for contractual debts of the company because they have not been party to that contract. In the past, the veil was sometimes ignored in the process of interpreting a statute, and as a matter of tort law it is open as a matter of authority that a direct duty of care may be owed by the managers of a parent company to accident victims of a subsidiary.

=== Tort victims and employees ===
Tort victims and employees, who did not contract with a company or have very unequal bargaining power, have been held to be exempted from the rules of limited liability in Chandler v Cape plc. In this case, the claimant was an employee of Cape plc's wholly owned subsidiary, which had gone insolvent. He successfully brought a claim in tort against Cape plc for causing him an asbestos disease, asbestosis. Arden LJ in the Court of Appeal held that if the parent had interfered in the operations of the subsidiary in any way, such as over trading issues, then it would be attached with responsibility for health and safety issues. Arden LJ emphasised that piercing the corporate veil was not necessary. There would be direct liability in tort for the parent company if it had interfered in the subsidiary's affairs. The High Court before it had held that liability would exist if the parent exercised control, all applying ordinary principles of tort law about liability of a third party for the actions of a tortfeasor. The restrictions on lifting the veil, found in contractual cases made no difference. This jurisdiction has been settled to play an important role in the human rights cases Vedanta Resources v Lungowe and King Okpabi v Royal Dutch Shell.

=== "Single economic unit" theory ===
Within the context of competition law, "undertakings" (which may encompass one or more legal persons) might be held liable for relevant infringements. By contrast, it is an axiomatic principle of English company law that a company is an entity separate and distinct from its members, who are liable only to the extent that they have contributed to the company's capital: Salomon v Salomon [1897]. The effect of this rule is that the individual subsidiaries within a conglomerate will be treated as separate entities and the parent cannot be made liable for the subsidiaries' debts on insolvency. Furthermore, it can create subsidiaries with inadequate capitalisation and secure loans to the subsidiaries with fixed charges over their assets, despite the fact that this is "not necessarily the most honest way of trading". The rule also applies in Scotland.

While the secondary literature refers to different means of "lifting" or "piercing" the veil (see Ottolenghi (1959)), judicial dicta supporting the view that the rule in Salomon is subject to exceptions are limited. Lord Denning MR outlined the theory of the "single economic unit" – wherein the court examined the overall business operation as an economic unit, rather than strict legal form – in DHN Food Distributors v Tower Hamlets. However this has largely been repudiated and has been treated with caution in subsequent judgments.

In Woolfson v Strathclyde BC, the House of Lords held that it was a decision to be confined to its facts (the question in DHN had been whether the subsidiary of the plaintiff, the former owning the premises on which the parent carried out its business, could receive compensation for loss of business under a compulsory purchase order notwithstanding that under the rule in Salomon, it was the parent and not the subsidiary that had lost the business). Likewise, in Bank of Tokyo v Karoon, Lord Goff, who had concurred in the result in DHN, held that the legal conception of the corporate structure was entirely distinct from the economic realities.

The "single economic unit" theory was likewise rejected by the CA in Adams v Cape Industries, where Slade LJ held that cases where the rule in Salomon had been circumvented were merely instances where they did not know what to do. The view expressed at first instance by HHJ Southwell QC in Creasey v Breachwood, that English law "definitely" recognised the principle that the corporate veil could be lifted, was described as a heresy by Hobhouse LJ in Ord v Bellhaven, and these doubts were shared by Moritt V-C in Trustor v Smallbone (No 2): the corporate veil cannot be lifted merely because justice requires it. Despite the rejection of the "justice of the case" test, it is observed from judicial reasoning in veil piercing cases that the courts employ "equitable discretion" guided by general principles such as mala fides to test whether the corporate structure has been used as a mere device.

=== Perfect obligation ===
The cases of Tan v Lim, where a company was used as a "façade" (per Russell J.) to defraud the creditors of the defendant and Gilford Motor Co Ltd v Horne, where an injunction was granted against a trader setting up a business which was merely as a vehicle allowing him to circumvent a covenant in restraint of trade are often said to create a "fraud" exception to the separate corporate personality. Similarly, in Gencor v Dalby, the tentative suggestion was made that the corporate veil was being lifted where the company was the "alter ego" of the defendant. In truth, as Lord Cooke (1997) has noted extrajudicially, it is because of the separate identity of the company concerned and not despite it that equity intervened in all of these cases. They are not instances of the corporate veil being pierced but instead involve the application of other rules of law. Finally, the "fraud exception" was rejected in Prest v Petrodel Resources Ltd.

=== Reverse piercing ===
There have been cases in which it is to the advantage of the shareholder to have the corporate structure ignored. Courts have been reluctant to agree to this. The often cited case Macaura v Northern Assurance Co Ltd is an example of that. Mr Macaura was the sole owner of a company he had set up to grow timber. The trees were destroyed by fire but the insurer refused to pay since the policy was with Macaura (not the company) and he was not the owner of the trees. The House of Lords upheld that refusal based on the separate legal personality of the company.

=== Criminal law ===
In English criminal law there have been cases in which the courts have been prepared to pierce the veil of incorporation. For example, in confiscation proceedings under the Proceeds of Crime Act 2002 monies received by a company can, depending upon the particular facts of the case as found by the court, be regarded as having been 'obtained' by an individual (who is usually, but not always, a director of the company). In consequence those monies may become an element in the individual's 'benefit' obtained from criminal conduct (and hence subject to confiscation from him). The position regarding 'piercing the veil' in English criminal law was given in the Court of Appeal judgment in the case of R v Seager in which the court said (at para 76):

There was no major disagreement between counsel on the legal principles by reference to which a court is entitled to "pierce" or "rend" or "remove" the corporate veil. As a matter of law, a duly formed and registered company is a separate legal entity from those who are its shareholders and it has rights and liabilities that are separate from its shareholders. A court can pierce the limited liability of the corporate entity and look at what lies behind it only in certain circumstances. It cannot do so simply because it considers it might be just to do so. Each of these circumstances involves impropriety and dishonesty. The court will then be entitled to look for the legal substance, not the just the form. In the context of criminal cases the courts have identified at least three situations when the corporate veil can be pierced. First if an offender attempts to shelter behind a corporate façade, or veil to hide his crime and his benefits from it. Secondly, where an offender does acts in the name of a company which (with the necessary mens rea) constitute a criminal offence which leads to the offender's conviction, then "the veil of incorporation is not so much pierced as rudely torn away": per Lord Bingham in Jennings v CPS, paragraph 16. Thirdly, where the transaction or business structures constitute a "device", "cloak" or "sham", i.e. an attempt to disguise the true nature of the transaction or structure so as to deceive third parties or the courts.

== United States ==
In the United States, corporate veil piercing is the most litigated issue in corporate law. Although courts are reluctant to hold an active shareholder liable for actions that are legally the responsibility of the corporation, even if the corporation has a single shareholder, they will often do so if the corporation was markedly noncompliant with corporate formalities, to prevent fraud, or to achieve equity in certain cases of undercapitalization.

In most jurisdictions, no bright-line rule exists and the ruling is based on common law precedents. In the United States, different theories, most important "alter ego" or "instrumentality rule", attempted to create a piercing standard. Mostly, they rest upon three basic prongs—namely:

- "unity of interest and ownership": the separate personalities of the shareholder and corporation cease to exist,
- "wrongful conduct": wrongful action taken by the corporation, and
- "proximate cause": as a reasonably foreseeable result of the wrongful action, harm was caused to the party that is seeking to pierce the corporate veil.

However, the theories failed to articulate a real-world approach which courts could directly apply to their cases. Thus, courts struggle with the proof of each prong and rather analyze all given factors. This is known as "totality of circumstances".

Generally, the plaintiff has to prove that the incorporation was merely a formality and that the corporation neglected corporate formalities and protocols, such as voting to approve major corporate actions in the context of a duly authorized corporate meeting. This is quite often the case when a corporation facing legal liability transfers its assets and business to another corporation with the same management and shareholders. It also happens with single person corporations that are managed in a haphazard manner. As such, the veil can be pierced in both civil cases and where regulatory proceedings are taken against a shell corporation.

=== Factors for courts to consider ===
Factors that a court may consider when determining whether or not to pierce the corporate veil include the following:

- Absence or inaccuracy of corporate records;
- Concealment or misrepresentation of members;
- Failure to maintain arm's length relationships with related entities;
- Failure to observe corporate formalities in terms of behavior and documentation;
- Intermingling of assets of the corporation and of the shareholder;
- Manipulation of assets or liabilities to concentrate the assets or liabilities;
- Non-functioning corporate officers and/or directors;
- Significant undercapitalization of the business entity (capitalization requirements vary based on industry, location, and specific company circumstances);
- Siphoning of corporate funds by the dominant shareholder(s);
- Treatment by an individual of the assets of corporation as his/her own;
- Use of the corporation as a façade for personal dealings (alter ego theory)

Not all of these factors need to be met in order for the court to pierce the corporate veil. Further, some courts might find that one factor is so compelling in a particular case that it will find the shareholders personally liable. For example, many large corporations do not pay dividends, without any suggestion of corporate impropriety, but particularly for a small or close corporation the failure to pay dividends may suggest financial impropriety.

==== Examples ====
- Berkey v. Third Avenue Railway, 244 N.Y. 602, 155 N.E. 914 (1927). Benjamin Cardozo decided there was no right to pierce the veil for a personal injury victim.
- Perpetual Real Estate Services, Inc. v. Michaelson Properties, Inc. 974 F.2d 545 (4th Cir. 1992). The Fourth Circuit held that no piercing could take place merely to prevent "unfairness" or "injustice", where a corporation in a real estate building partnership could not pay its share of a lawsuit bill
- Fletcher v. Atex, Inc., 68 F.3d 1451 (2d Cir. 1995), finding insufficient that a parent company so dominated the operations of a subsidiary that the corporate veil should be disregarded.
- Minton v. Cavaney, 56 Cal.2d 576 (1961). Mr. Minton's daughter drowned in the public swimming pool owned by Mr. Cavaney. Then-Associate Justice Roger J. Traynor (later Chief Justice) of the Supreme Court of California held: "The equitable owners of a corporation, for example, are personally liable...when they provide inadequate capitalization and actively participate in the conduct of corporate affairs."
- Kinney Shoe Corp. v. Polan, 939 F.2d 209 (4th Cir. 1991). The veil was pierced where its enforcement would not have matched the purpose of limited liability. Here a corporation was undercapitalized and was only used to shield a shareholder's other company from debts.

=== Internal Revenue Service ===
In recent years, the Internal Revenue Service (IRS) in the United States has made use of corporate veil piercing arguments and logic as a means of recapturing income, estate, or gift tax revenue, particularly from business entities created primarily for estate planning purposes. A number of U.S. Tax Court cases involving Family Limited Partnerships (FLPs) illustrate the IRS's use of veil-piercing arguments. Since owners of U.S. business entities created for asset protection and estate purposes often fail to maintain proper corporate compliance, the IRS has achieved multiple high-profile court victories.

=== Reverse piercing ===
Reverse veil piercing is when the debt of a shareholder is imputed onto the corporation. Throughout the United States, the general rule is that reverse veil piercing is not allowed. However the California Court of Appeals has allowed reverse veil piercing against a limited liability company (LLC) based largely on the difference in remedies available to creditors when it comes to attaching assets of a debtors' LLC as compared to attaching assets of a corporation.

== See also ==
- US corporate law
- UK company law
