= Absolute privilege in English law =

Defence to an action for defamation

Absolute privilege is a complete defence to an action for defamation in English law. If the defence of absolute privilege applies it is irrelevant that a defendant has acted with malice, knew information was false or acted solely to damage the reputation of the plaintiff. Absolute privilege can be deployed in a narrow range of cases. Statements made in judicial proceedings are protected as are communications between a solicitor and their client. The Bill of Rights of 1689 provides that proceedings of the Parliament of the United Kingdom are also covered by absolute privilege.

== Privileged statements ==
=== Reports of court proceedings ===
Sections 14(1) to (3) of the Defamation Act 1996 read:

(1) A fair and accurate report of proceedings in public before a court to which this section applies, if published contemporaneously with the proceedings, is absolutely privileged.

(2) A report of proceedings which by an order of the court, or as a consequence of any statutory provision, is required to be postponed shall be treated as published contemporaneously if it is published as soon as practicable after publication is permitted.
(3)This section applies to—

(a)any court in the United Kingdom;
(b)any court established under the law of a country or territory outside the United Kingdom;
(c)any international court or tribunal established by the Security Council of the United Nations or by an international agreement;

and in paragraphs (a) and (b) "court" includes any tribunal or body exercising the judicial power of the State.

The defence under this section is excluded by section 8(6) of the Rehabilitation of Offenders Act 1974 (as amended by subsection (4) of this section). That is, reporting on proceedings relating to a spent offence is not privileged.

Section 14 replaces section 3 of the Law of Libel Amendment Act 1888 and section 8 of the Defamation Act 1952. Subsection (3) was amended by the Defamation Act 2013.

=== Inquiries ===
Section 37(3) of the Inquiries Act 2005 provides:

For the purposes of the law of defamation, the same privilege attaches to—

(a) any statement made in or for the purposes of proceedings before an inquiry (including the report and any interim report of the inquiry), and
(b) reports of proceedings before an inquiry,

as would be the case if those proceedings were proceedings before a court in the relevant part of the United Kingdom.

=== Senedd ===
Section 42 of the Government of Wales Act 2006 provides:

(1) For the purposes of the law of defamation—

(a) any statement made in Senedd proceedings, and
(b) the publication under the authority of the Senedd of any statement,

is absolutely privileged.

(2) The Welsh Ministers may by regulations make provision for and in connection with establishing in any legal proceedings that any statement or publication is absolutely privileged by virtue of subsection (1).

(3) No regulations are to be made under subsection (2) unless a draft of the statutory instrument containing them has been laid before, and approved by a resolution of, the Senedd.

(4) In this section "statement" has the same meaning as in the Defamation Act 1996 (c. 31).

This section replaces section 77 of the Government of Wales Act 1998.

=== Reports by the Parliamentary Commissioner for Administration ===
Section 10(5) of the Parliamentary Commissioner Act 1967 provides:

For the purposes of the law of defamation, any such publication as is hereinafter mentioned shall be absolutely privileged, that is to say—

(a) the publication of any matter by the Commissioner in making a report to either House of Parliament for the purposes of this Act;
(b) the publication of any matter by a member of the House of Commons in communicating with the Commissioner or his officers for those purposes or by the Commissioner or his officers in communicating with such a member for those purposes; .
(c) the publication by such a member to the person by whom a complaint was made under this Act of a report or statement sent to the member in respect of the complaint in pursuance of subsection (1) of this section;
(d) the publication by the Commissioner to such a person as is mentioned in subsection (2) [or (2A)] of this section of a report sent to that person in pursuance of that subsection.

=== Local Commissioner in Wales ===
Section 74 of the Local Government Act 2000 provides:

For the purposes of the law of defamation, any statement (whether written or oral) made by a Local Commissioner in Wales in connection with the exercise of his functions under this Part shall be absolutely privileged.

=== Fair trading ===
Section 82(2) of the Fair Trading Act 1973 provides:

For the purposes of the law relating to defamation, absolute privilege shall attach to any report of the Advisory Committee or of the Commission under this Act.

=== Competition ===
Section 57 of the Competition Act 1998 provides:

For the purposes of the law relating to defamation, absolute privilege attaches to any advice, guidance, notice or direction given, or decision made, by the Director in the exercise of any of his functions under this Part.

=== Enterprise ===
Section 108 of the Enterprise Act 2002 provides:

For the purposes of the law relating to defamation, absolute privilege attaches to any advice, guidance, notice or direction given, or decision or report made, by the OFT, [OFCOM,] the Commission or the Secretary of State in the exercise of any of their functions under this Part.

Section 173 of that Act provides:

For the purposes of the law relating to defamation, absolute privilege attaches to any advice, guidance, notice or direction given, or decision or report made, by the OFT, by the Secretary of State, by the appropriate Minister (other than the Secretary of State acting alone) or by the Commission in the exercise of any of their functions under this Part.

== History ==
Section 69(2) of the Courts and Legal Services Act 1990 formerly provided:

For the purposes of the law of defamation, the publication by the Lord Chancellor, a designated judge or the Director of any advice or reasons given by or to him in the exercise of functions under this Part shall be absolutely privileged.

== Human rights considerations ==
In 2002, the European Court of Human Rights found that the application of absolute privilege to reporting of statements made in Parliament was not a violation of the Convention rights of the applicant, a woman referred to by her MP as a "neighbour from hell" in a debate on municipal housing policy.

== See also ==
- Parliamentary privilege
