= English defamation law =

Modern libel and slander laws in many countries are originally descended from English defamation law. The history of defamation law in England is somewhat obscure; civil actions for damages seem to have been relatively frequent as far back as the Statute of Gloucester in the reign of Edward I (1272–1307). The law of libel emerged during the reign of James I (1603–1625) under Attorney General Edward Coke who started a series of libel prosecutions. Scholars frequently attribute strict English defamation law to James I's outlawing of duelling. From that time, both the criminal and civil remedies have been found in full operation.

English law allows actions for libel to be brought in the High Court for any published statements which are alleged to defame a named or identifiable individual in a manner which causes them loss in their trade or profession, or damages their reputation. Allowable defences are justification, honest opinion (previously known as fair comment), and privilege. A defamatory statement is presumed to be false, unless the defendant can prove its truth.

English defamation law puts the burden of proof on the defendant, and does not require the plaintiff to prove falsehood. For that reason, it has been considered an impediment to free speech in much of the developed world. In many cases of libel tourism, plaintiffs sued in England to censor critical works when their home countries would reject the case outright. In the United States, the 2010 SPEECH Act makes foreign libel judgements unenforceable and unrecognisable by U.S. courts if they don't comply with U.S. protections for freedom of speech and due process, which was made largely in response to the English laws.

The Defamation Act 2013 substantially changed English defamation law in recognition of these concerns, by narrowing the criteria for a successful claim, mandating evidence of actual or probable harm, and enhancing the scope of existing defences for website operators, public interest, and privileged publications. The 2013 law applies to causes of action occurring after its commencement on 1 January 2014.

== History ==
The earlier history of the English law of defamation is somewhat obscure; Anglo-Saxon law practised in England after the fall of the Roman Empire seemed to follow the idea of iniuria, allowing plaintiffs who had been insulted to accept monetary compensation instead of seeking revenge. Civil actions for damages seem to have been tolerably frequent as far back as the reign of Edward I (1272–1307). There was no distinction drawn between written and spoken words, and when no monetary penalty was involved, such cases fell within the old jurisdiction of the ecclesiastical courts, which were only finally abolished in the eighteenth century. It seems uncertain whether or not any generally applicable criminal process was in place.

The crime of scandalum magnatum (insulting the peers of the realm through slander or libel) was established by the Statute of Westminster 1275, c. 34, but the first instance of criminal libel is generally agreed to be the De Libellis Famosis case, tried in the Star Chamber in the reign of James I by Edward Coke who, in his judgement on the case, said that a person's "good name ... ought to be more precious to him than his life". The case centred around an "infamous" libel about John Whitgift, the late Archbishop of Canterbury. It was held that libel against a private person could be considered a crime if it could provoke revenge that would threaten a breach of the peace, that libel against the monarch or government could be illegal, even if true, because "it concerns not only the breach of the peace, but also the scandal of government", and that a libel against a public figure was a more serious offence than one against a private person. This set a precedent in common law that judges decided all factors except that of publication; therefore, a guilty verdict from a jury in a libel trial resolved only that the material had been published while the judge decided whether a libel had been committed.

The Libel Act 1843 enacted several codifications of defamation law in the UK, including the offer of an apology and the claim that the libel was without malice or neglect as mitigating evidence, as well as malicious and knowingly false libel as aggravating evidence.

Up until the Defamation Act 2013, Parliament had enacted defamation law reforms about every 50 years, with the Defamation Acts of 1996 and 1952 being the two most recent. Most of these reforms have focused on trying to alter the law around the high burden of proof on defendants and the large damages awarded in past cases, which critics have said stifles free speech, and perceived overreach of English courts when they exercise jurisdiction in cases which in reality have little connection to the UK, giving rise to 'libel tourism'.

The common law crimes of criminal libel and seditious libel were abolished for UK citizens by the Coroners and Justice Act 2009, and the crime of blasphemous libel was abolished as a crime by the Criminal Justice and Immigration Act 2008.

=== Volume of litigation ===
An increase in defamation litigation has been noted in England from the early seventeenth century. In the south of England, this litigation rose most sharply in cases of sexual slander and were notable for the increasing number of women pursuing litigation in defence of their sexual reputation. In one respect, this pattern has been linked with increasing legal access for women. In another respect, however, it has been linked to the rise of "middling" traders in urban centres and an increasing concern with the defence of family reputation in which a woman's sexual integrity was coterminous with the integrity of her household. A similar pattern has been noted in the northern English jurisdictions but this rise seems not to have occurred until the latter years of the seventeenth century.

=== Criminal offence ===
See defamatory libel.

== Present law ==
English law allows actions for libel to be brought in the High Court for any published statements which are alleged to defame a named or identifiable individual (or individuals; under English law companies are legal persons, and allowed to bring suit for defamation) in a manner which causes them loss in their trade or profession, or causes a reasonable person to think worse of him, her or them.

A is liable for saying anything to C about B which would be apt to make the average citizen think worse of the latter.

— Tony Weir, Tort Law, p. 162

A statement can include an implication; for instance, a photograph of a particular politician accompanying a headline reading "Corrupt Politicians" could be held as an allegation that that politician was personally corrupt. Once it is shown that a statement was published, and that it has a defamatory meaning, that statement is presumed to be false unless the defendant is able to raise a defence to his defamatory act.

Under English law, because companies are legal persons they can sue on the basis of libel the same as natural persons. Cases supporting this principle go as far back as the 19th century, such as South Hetton Coal Co Ltd v North Eastern News Association Ltd [1894], and extend to more recent cases such as Bognor Regis UDC v Campion [1972] and the McLibel case, when McDonald's sued several protesters.

The 2006 case of Keith-Smith v Williams confirmed that discussions on the Internet were public enough for libel to take place.

=== Slander actionable per se ===
While in libel cases there is no burden to prove damage done to reputation, there generally is in slander cases. In some specific circumstances however, there is no need to prove that damage was caused by a slander; this is called 'slander actionable per se'. The Faulks Committee, a parliamentary committee set up to propose reforms to UK defamation law, recommended in 1975 that this distinction between libel and slander should be abolished.

The following are actionable without proof of special or actual damage:

- Words imputing a crime punishable with imprisonment
- Words "calculated to disparage" a person in their office, calling, trade, business, or profession. Established in section 2 of the Defamation Act 1952.

In addition, under section 3 of the Defamation Act 1952, no proof of special or actual damage is needed for "slander of title, slander of goods or other malicious falsehood" related to:

- Words "calculated to cause pecuniary damage" and published in writing or permanent form, and
- Words "calculated to cause pecuniary damage to the plaintiff in respect of any office, profession, calling, trade or business held or carried on by him at the time of the publication".

Slander imputing "loathsome" or contagious diseases also used to be actionable per se under English common law. It was removed by section 14 of the Defamation Act 2013, but remains in other jurisdictions.

=== Publication in a permanent form ===
Under section 166 of the Broadcasting Act 1990 and section 4 of the Theatres Act 1968, statements either within a performance of a play or in any programme included in a programme service can be considered publication in permanent form. Neither of these sections apply to Scotland.

Section 1 of the Defamation Act 1952 had allowed the "broadcasting of words by means of wireless telegraphy" to be considered publication in permanent form. This section was repealed and replaced by the Broadcasting Act 1990.

=== Burden of proof on the defendant ===
In the common law of defamation, it is frequently said that the "burden of proof" falls upon the defendant. The Defamation Act 2013 added a requirement that the claimant show "serious harm" was caused or was likely to be caused to the claimant's reputation, adding a significant burden of proof upon the claimant.

While specific legal requirements may differ depending on local laws, the common law of libel generally only requires the claimant to prove that a statement was made by the defendant, and that it was defamatory – a relatively easy element to prove. The claimant is not required to prove that the content of the statement was false. On the other hand, as a defendant in the common laws of libel, proving the truth of the statement would be considered an affirmative defence. Before 2013, this defence (available as a matter of common law) was called justification.

If a claimant launches a defamation lawsuit in respect of a statement that is subsequently proven to be accurate, the defendant may launch a counterclaim for fraud, recovery of unjustified settlement funds, and other factors. An example is that of the Sunday Times and cyclist Lance Armstrong. Armstrong was paid £300,000 by the newspaper after a libel claim in 2004. Following the report by USADA in 2012 on Armstrong's doping, the Sunday Times stated it might attempt to recover the money it lost and might counterclaim Armstrong for fraud. Armstrong ultimately settled with the paper for an undisclosed sum in 2013.

In certain instances, including but not limited to those involving public interests or responsible journalism, the burden of proof will be increasingly complex and require additional proceedings that may remain ongoing for years and come at significant costs.

=== Defences ===
As a defendant in a defamation lawsuit, in addition to proving the truth of the statement which would be considered an affirmative defence, a number of additional defences often employed may include the following:

==== Honest opinion ====
This defence arises if the defendant shows that the statement was a view that a reasonable person could have held, even if they were motivated by dislike or hatred of the plaintiff. The honest opinion defence (formerly the fair comment defence) is sometimes known as "the critic's defence" as it is designed to protect the right of the press to state valid opinions on matters of public interest such as governmental activity, political debate, public figures and general affairs. It also defends comments on works of art in the public eye such as theatre productions, music, and literature. However, fair comment, and justification defences will fail if they are based on misstatements of fact.

An example of this arose in London Artists Ltd v Littler (1969). When a whole group of actors resigned from a play the director wrote a letter to each of them and to their agent company, accusing them of plotting against him. The case was decided to be a matter of public concern because of the general interest in entertainment.

For an opinion to be honest opinion it must be based upon facts, as highlighted in Kemsley v Foot [1952] AC 345. The politician and journalist Michael Foot had printed an article in Tribune, a left-wing newspaper, condemning the London Evening Standard for unethically publishing a certain story. Lord Kemsley, who owned other newspapers, maintained that the article's headline, "Lower than Kemsley", impugned the standards of the Kemsley press. The defence of fair comment was allowed to stand.

There is also no need for the perpetrator of the comment to actually believe in it as in court the comment will be measured according to an "objective" test. In Telnikoff v Matusevitch (1992), Telnikoff wrote an article in The Daily Telegraph criticising the BBC Russian Service for over-recruiting people from ethnic minority groups. Matusevitch replied accusing the claimant of being a racist. The House of Lords held that he had to show that the comment was based around the article, which would make it fair comment as it was possible most people would not know why he was making such a statement.

A defence of fair comment can fail if the defendant shows malice, as in Thomas v Bradbury, Agnew & Co. (1906); the defendant not only criticised the claimant's book but made many personal slurs against the author, invalidating the defence.

The Defamation Act 2013 replaced the common law defence of fair comment with the statutory defence of honest opinion. Change to the name of the defence had been suggested in 1975 by the Faulks Committee on the basis that it protected unfair comment as well as fair comments. Renaming of the defence was recommended by the Supreme Court in Spiller v Joseph where Lord Phillips suggested a change to "honest comment"—the Court of Appeal in British Chiropractic Association v Singh had previously suggested "honest opinion".

==== Absolute privilege ====
If the defendant's comments were made in Parliament, or under oath in a court of law, they are entitled to absolute privilege. This privilege is absolute: qualified privilege protects only the communication of the complained statement. There can be no investigation into whether remarks made in a situation of absolute privilege are defamatory.

In 2002, the European Court of Human Rights found that the application of absolute privilege to reporting of statements made in Parliament was not a violation of the rights of the applicant, a woman referred to by her MP as a "neighbour from hell" in a debate on municipal housing policy.

==== Qualified privilege ====
There are several situations where the defence of qualified privilege applies. Reports and remarks of Parliamentary proceedings, as well as reports of judicial proceedings attract qualified privilege. These have to be "fair and accurate"; as Lord Denning stated in Associated Newspaper Ltd v Dingle, if the writer "garnishes" and "embellishes" such reports with any form of circumstantial evidence, the defence cannot apply. Additionally, where there is a mutual interest between two parties, statements deemed to be defamatory are protected where it can be proved there is a duty to impart them. The case of Watt v Longsdon exemplifies this principle, and the limitations of it. Here, the director of a company informed the chairman of alleged sexual misconduct involving Watt. This communication was deemed privilege, but the informing of such suspicion to the claimant's wife was not.

The defence has seen expansion recently in light of Reynolds v Times Newspapers Ltd, where the House of Lords—drawing principally on Lord Nicholls' judgement—established that the mass media could be entitled to the defence, where criteria of "responsible journalism" (further expanded upon in Loutchansky v Times Newspapers Ltd) were met. This expansion was confirmed in the case of Jameel v Wall Street Journal Europe, and has been described as giving newspapers protections similar to the First Amendment to the United States Constitution. The defence used in Reynolds v Times Newspapers Ltd was abolished by the Defamation Act 2013, Section 4 subsection 6. This does not have an effect on the common law defence based on a reciprocity of duty or interest as between the maker of the statement and the recipient.

See section 15 of, and Schedule 1 to, the Defamation Act 1996. See also section 1(5) of the Public Bodies (Admission to Meetings) Act 1960, section 121 of the Broadcasting Act 1996, section 79 of the Freedom of Information Act 2000 and section 72 of the Learning and Skills Act 2000.

This defence was abolished by s4(6) Defamation Act 2013, being replaced with the statutory defence of publication on a matter of public interest.

==== Innocent dissemination ====
In general, everyone involved in the dissemination of the defamation is liable as having published it. But it has been held that some forms of distribution are so mechanical that the actor ought not to be held liable unless he/she ought to have realized that there was defamation involved. The defence is known as innocent dissemination or mechanical distributor.

==== Justification ====
A claim of defamation is defeated if the defendant proves on the balance of probabilities that the statement was true. If the defence fails, a court may treat any material produced by the defence to substantiate it, and any ensuing media coverage, as factors aggravating the libel and increasing the damages. A statement quoting another person cannot be justified merely by proving that the other person had also made the statement: the substance of the allegation must be proved.

The Defamation Act 2013 replaced this defence with the defence of truth.

===== Spent convictions =====
Section 8(3) of the Rehabilitation of Offenders Act 1974 provides that nothing in section 4(1) of that Act prevents the defendant in any action for libel or slander begun after the commencement of that Act by a rehabilitated person, and founded upon the publication of any matter imputing that the plaintiff has committed or been charged with or prosecuted for or convicted of or sentenced for an offence which was the subject of a spent conviction, from relying on any defence of justification which is available to him, or restrict the matters he may establish in support of any such defence. But a defendant in any such action is not, by virtue of the said section 8(3), entitled to rely upon the defence of justification if the publication is proved to have been made with malice.

The Act does not apply to offenders sentenced to 4 years in prison or more, whose offences can never become spent.

===== Where the words contain more than one charge =====
In an action for libel or slander in respect of words containing two or more distinct charges against the plaintiff, a defence of justification does not fail by reason only that the truth of every charge is not proved if the words not proved to be true do not materially injure the plaintiff's reputation having regard to the truth of the remaining charges. In other words, to succeed in their defence of justification, the defendant need not prove every charge to be true, just enough of the charges so that the remaining charges do not on their own constitute a material injury to the plaintiff's reputation.

==== Apology and payment into court for newspaper libel ====
See section 2 of the Libel Act 1843 and the Libel Act 1845. This defence has fallen into disuse. In 1975, the Faulks Committee recommended that it be abolished.

==== Death of the plaintiff ====
See the proviso to section 1(1) of the Law Reform (Miscellaneous Provisions) Act 1934.

==== Limitation ====
See section 4A(a) of the Limitation Act 1980.

=== Damages ===
The level of damages awarded for defamation cases have been subject to sustained criticism from judges and academics.

Some have commented that libel damages are high compared to the sums awarded for personal injuries. In a consultation considering personal injury damages the Law Commission commented that:

The disparity between the sums of compensation awarded offends the proper relationship which ought to exist between pain, suffering and loss of amenity on the one hand and loss of reputation and injury to feelings on the other. A "wrong scale of values" is being applied.

citing various awards including: £350,000 in John v MGN [1992]; £200,000 Donovan v The Face Magazine [1993]; and £600,000 Sutcliffe v Private Eye [1989]; and contrasting these with a payment "in the region of £35,000 to £50,000" for "a person who loses a leg through amputation".

However, the commission went on to note that defamation damages have a "vindicatory element", and that notwithstanding comments from some judges (McCarey v Associated Newspapers Ltd, 1965), "the prevailing English judicial approach is that a valid comparison cannot be made between personal injury awards and damages for defamation"; but concludes that "we do not believe that such counter-arguments can explain, or indeed justify, a practice 'whereby a plaintiff in an action for libel may recover a larger sum by way of damages for an injury to his reputation ... than the damages awarded for pain and suffering to the victim of an industrial accident who has lost an eye ..."

In the ECHR case Tolstoy Miloslavsky v. United Kingdom, the European Court of Human Rights in Strasbourg added to the criticism of awards given by juries. Defamation is a curious part of the law of tort in this respect, because usually juries are present. The argument goes that juries, when deciding how much to award, will be told the awards in previous cases. They will have a tendency to push to the limits of what was awarded before, leading to a general upward drift of payouts. However, in John & MGN Ltd [1997] QB 586, the Court of Appeal laid down rules to constrain the jury's discretion, and give more comprehensive advice before juries decide.

==== Mitigation of damages ====
As to evidence of an apology, see section 1 of the Libel Act 1843. As to evidence of other damages recovered by the plaintiff, see section 12 of the Defamation Act 1952.

=== Consolidation of actions ===
As to consolidation of actions, see section 5 of the Law of Libel Amendment Act 1888 (libel) and section 13 of the Defamation Act 1952 (slander).

=== Reforms in 2013 ===
On 25 April 2013 the Defamation Act 2013 was enacted. Among other things, it requires plaintiffs who bring actions in the courts of England and Wales alleging libel by defendants who do not live in the UK (previously also not in the EU or a country that was a party to the Lugano Convention) to demonstrate that the court is the most appropriate place to bring the action. In addition, it includes a requirement for claimants to show that they have suffered serious harm, which in the case of for-profit bodies is restricted to serious financial loss. It removes the previous presumption in favour of a Jury trial. It introduces new statutory defences of truth, honest opinion, and "publication on a matter of public interest", to replace the common law defences of justification, fair comment, and the Reynolds defence respectively, and a completely new defence applying to peer-reviewed publication in a scientific or academic journal.

The removal of a right to trial by jury was enforced in the case Yeo MP v Times Newspapers Limited. The judge in this case denied the defendant a right to trial by jury, despite various arguments from the defence including public interest due to the subject matter of the case and the public role held by the claimant as a senior member of parliament, deeming arguments from case law ill-founded due to changes to underlying legislation. The judge argued that the Civil Procedure Rules encouraging "saving expense" and "ensuring that a case was dealt with expeditiously" supported a trial without jury.

==== Serious harm ====
An additional requirement for defamation was introduced by section 1 of the Defamation Act 2013, to show that "serious harm" was caused or was likely to be caused to the claimant's reputation. This addition brought in a significant change to the previous common law relating to damage to reputation, as it is now necessary for the claimant to provide factual evidence regarding the actual or likely (on the balance of probabilities) consequences of the words used, in addition to just analysing the meaning of the words. A consequence of this change is to stop less serious cases coming to court.

There was different legal analysis to the proper interpretation of this new clause in the courts, leading eventually to a case being decided by the Supreme Court in 2019. The Supreme Court provided legal analysis showing a more significant change from the common law than an alternative legal analysis accepted by the Court of Appeal, providing clarity for future cases. In the particular case under consideration serious harm was found to have occurred because the defamation was published in a national newspaper, which had been read by people who knew the claimant, and was likely in the future to be read by new acquaintances, along with the gravity of the statements made.

=== Procedure ===
Under section 15 of the County Courts Act 1984, actions for libel and slander are outside of the jurisdiction of county courts. Defamation cases must be brought started in the High Court unless litigants agree to transfer the case to the county court, which only happens rarely. A pre-action protocol exists for media and communication claims which covers defamation claims (as well as misuse of private information, malicious falsehood, data protection claims, and other claims involving the media), which encourages claimants to set out sufficient details to identify the statement they purport to be defamatory and how it is defamatory in pre-action correspondence. Part 53 of the Civil Procedure Rules governs defamation claims.

Before the Defamation Act 2013 added a statutory 'serious harm' threshold test, the High Court routinely struck out trivial claims where "no real and substantial tort" had occurred as an abuse of process under CPR 3.4. The ordinary process for courts to handle defamation trials is in two stages: an early determination of the meaning of the words complained of, followed by a trial to determine the remaining matters: whether the words were defamatory, whether a defence applies, as well as remedies. An interlocutory appeal against the determination of meaning is possible, such as in British Chiropractic Association v Singh.

== Cases ==
=== Aldington v Tolstoy ===
In 1989, Toby Low, 1st Baron Aldington initiated and won a record £1.5 million (plus £500,000 costs) in a libel case against Count Nikolai Tolstoy-Miloslavsky and Nigel Watts, who had accused him of war crimes in Austria during his involvement in the repatriation of the Cossacks at Lienz, Austria, at the end of World War II. This award, which bankrupted Tolstoy, was overturned by the European Court of Human Rights in July 1995 as "not necessary in a democratic society" and a violation of Tolstoy's right to freedom of expression under Article 10 of the European Convention on Human Rights. This judgement significantly reduced the level of subsequent libel awards.

=== The 'McLibel' case ===
In 1990, McDonald's Restaurants sued David Morris and Helen Steel (known as the "McLibel Two") for libel. The original case lasted seven years, making it the longest-running court action in English legal history. Beginning in 1986, London Greenpeace, a small environmental campaigning group, distributed a pamphlet entitled What's wrong with McDonald's: Everything they don't want you to know. The pamphlet claimed that the McDonald's corporation sold unhealthy food, exploited its work force, practised unethical marketing of its products towards children, was cruel to animals, needlessly used up resources and created pollution with its packaging, and also was responsible for destroying the South American rain forests. Although McDonald's won two hearings, the widespread public opinion against them turned the case into a matter of embarrassment for the company. McDonald's announced that it has no plans to collect the £40,000 it was awarded by the courts, and offered to pay the defendants to drop the case.

Steel and Morris in turn sued the UK government in the European Court of Human Rights, asserting that their rights to free speech and a fair trial had been infringed. Their most important claims were that English libel law was unfair to defendants, that it was unfair to require two people of modest means to defend themselves against a large company without legal aid, and that the damages were not justified. The court found partly in their favour, and ruled that:

- The denial of legal aid left Steel and Morris unable to defend themselves effectively
- Pressure groups should be permitted to report in good faith on matters of public interest, as journalists are
- It was no defence that the pamphlet repeated claims already published, or that the defendants believed them to be true
- It was reasonable to require the defendants to prove their claims
- A large multinational corporation should be allowed to sue for defamation, and need not prove the allegations were false
- The damages were disproportionate, considering the defendants' income and that McDonald's did not have to prove any financial loss.

=== Irving v Penguin Books and Lipstadt ===
On 5 September 1996, Holocaust denier David Irving filed a libel suit concerning Deborah Lipstadt's book Denying the Holocaust. He named in his suit Lipstadt and Penguin Books, whose division Plume had published a British edition of her book. He claimed that "his reputation as an historian was defamed". Irving lost the case. He was liable to pay all of Penguin's costs of the trial, estimated to be as much as £2 million (US$3.2 million). He was forced into bankruptcy in 2002 and lost his home. Lipstadt spent five years defending herself. She described her story in History on Trial, published by Ecco in 2005.

=== Funding Evil case ===
In 2003 Rachel Ehrenfeld published her book Funding Evil, which explained how terrorist groups receive funding. Khalid bin Mahfouz was accused of funding terrorist groups in the book. The book was not sold in British bookstores, but 23 copies were sold in Britain, which gave the United Kingdom jurisdiction. Mahfouz sued Ehrenfeld for libel, to which Ehrenfeld responded by calling this libel tourism, and refusing to recognize the legitimacy of the case. On a summary judgement in Mahfouz's favor, after Ehrenfeld refused to appear in court, she counter-sued in U.S. courts claiming a violation of the First Amendment. While the New York courts ruled they did not have jurisdiction over Mahfouz as he was not in New York, the New York State Legislature passed "The Libel Terrorism Protection Act" and the U.S. Congress responded with the SPEECH act, which made foreign libel judgements unenforceable unless they meet the criteria set forth by the First Amendment.

=== The Simon Singh case ===
On 19 April 2008, British author and journalist Simon Singh wrote an article in The Guardian, which resulted in him being sued for libel by the British Chiropractic Association (BCA). The suit was dropped by the BCA on 15 April 2010.

Some commentators have suggested this ruling could set a precedent to restrict freedom of speech to criticise alternative medicine.

The Wall Street Journal Europe has cited the case as an example of how British libel law "chills free speech", commenting that:

The U.S. Congress is considering a bill that would make British libel judgments unenforceable in the U.S. ... Mr. Singh is unlikely to be the last victim of Britain's libel laws. Settling scientific and political disputes through lawsuits, though, runs counter the very principles that have made Western progress possible. "The aim of science is not to open the door to infinite wisdom, but to set a limit to infinite error", Bertolt Brecht wrote in The Life of Galileo. ... It is time British politicians restrain the law so that wisdom prevails in the land, and not errors.

The charity Sense about Science has launched a campaign to draw attention to the case. They have issued a statement entitled "The law has no place in scientific disputes", with myriad signatories representing science, journalism, publishing, arts, humanities, entertainment, skeptics, campaign groups, and law. As of 31 March 2011, over 56,000 have signed. Many press sources have covered the issue.

=== The Hardeep Singh case ===
In 2011, Carter-Ruck represented journalist Hardeep Singh on a 'no win, no fee' basis in an appeal brought against him by Baba Jeet Singh Ji Maharaj. Baba Jeet Singh had originally issued libel proceedings in 2007 in respect of an article written by Hardeep Singh and published in The Sikh Times. Baba Jeet Singh Ji Maharaj sought to appeal an order stating that the subject-matter was a matter of religious doctrine on which the court could not rule. The Court of Appeal ordered Baba Jeet Singh to pay £250,000 as security for the costs of the proceedings; however he failed to do so and the case was ultimately struck out. Singh joined the efforts of the Libel Reform Campaign.

=== Cycling and doping ===
The cyclist Lance Armstrong employed English law firm Schillings to help him fight allegations of doping by using English libel law. Schilling's Gideon Benaim and Matthew Himsworth worked on his cases. At one point, Schillings told "every UK paper and broadcaster" to not re-state allegations raised by the book L. A. Confidentiel.

Armstrong sued London's Sunday Times for libel in 2004 after it referenced the book. They settled out of court for an undisclosed sum in 2006. After the USADA 2012 report on doping during Armstrong's racing era, the Sunday Times stated it might attempt to recover the money it lost and might counterclaim Armstrong for fraud. Lance Armstrong ultimately settled with the Sunday Times for an undisclosed sum in 2013.

Emma O'Reilly, a masseuse who worked with Armstrong's U.S. Postal cycling team, claimed that English libel law prevented her from speaking out about the doping she saw in cycling and the Tour de France. David Walsh, co-author of L.A. Confidentiel, told the Press Gazette in 2012 that if not for English libel law, "Lance Armstrong might not have won the Tour De France seven times and the history of sport would be different and better".

In 2013, Armstrong admitted the doping on television.

== Cases not in court ==
In addition to case law, there are numerous notable examples of authors and publishers refusing to print work out of fear of libel suits. Several novels have been cancelled or altered after threats of libel suits.

UK Prime Minister John Major sued several periodicals, including Simon Regan's Scallywag, and New Statesman, over stories about an alleged affair with caterer Clare Latimer; Scallywag closed afterwards. It was later revealed that Major had a real affair with MP Edwina Currie. Latimer claimed Downing Street had used her as a decoy to confuse the press.

=== Child sexual abuse ===
After BBC television personality Jimmy Savile died, it came to light that hundreds of people accused him of having abused them when they were children. These accusations were not generally published in British media until his death, in apprehension of litigation. It is not considered possible to defame someone who has died, so a family cannot raise charges on a decedent's behalf. The Sunday Mirror neglected to publish a story in 1994 regarding two of his alleged victims (who did not want to be named at the time) because its lawyers were worried about the costs of a libel trial. Savile is known to have frequently litigated against newspapers that published accusations against him. They often settled out of court. A British newspaper editor, Brian Hitchen, claimed he heard from a ship's captain about Savile's abuse decades before his death, but noted that libel laws had prevented people from speaking up about Savile's abuse. Editors sometimes alluded to Savile's conduct with euphemisms due to his reputed litigiousness, describing him with terms such as "eccentric" or "strange". In another case journalist Lynn Barber, having heard frequent rumours that he was a paedophile, asked him for a 1991 profile in The Independent on Sunday whether he "had a skeleton in his closet". In a 2008 case, The Sun published an article with a photo including Savile while discussing child abuse at Haut de la Garenne, a children's home that became the subject of the Jersey child abuse investigation. Due again to his litigiousness and existing defamation law, the paper did not directly accuse him of anything, despite evidence at hand.

== Privacy ==
Since the passage of the Human Rights Act 1998, the law of defamation has been subject to pressure for reform from two particular provisions of the European Convention on Human Rights: Article 10 ECHR guarantees freedom of expression, while Article 8 ECHR guarantees a right to respect for privacy and family life. The question is, therefore, whether the law of defamation strikes the appropriate balance between allowing, for instance, newspapers sufficient freedom to engage in journalistic activity and, on the other hand, the right of private citizens not to suffer unwarranted intrusion.

An independent tort protecting privacy has been rejected in a number of cases including Kaye v Robertson in the Court of Appeal and again in the House of Lords in Wainwright v Home Office.

== Proposals to amend the law ==
=== The Porter Committee ===
In 1948, this Committee produced the Report of the Committee on the Law of Defamation (Cmd 7536). This was partly implemented by the Defamation Act 1952.

=== The Faulks Committee ===
This committee produced the following reports:

- Interim Report of the Committee on Defamation (Cmnd 5571). 1974.
- Report of the Committee on Defamation (Cmnd 5909). 1975.

See also "Defamation Defamed" (1971) 115 Sol Jo 357.

=== The Libel Reform Campaign ===
On 10 November 2009, English PEN and Index on Censorship launched their report into English libel law entitled "Free Speech Is Not For Sale". The report was highly critical of English libel law and the "chilling" effect it has on free expression globally. The report made 10 recommendations on how English libel law could be improved; including reversing the burden of proof, capping damages at £10,000, introducing a single publication rule, and establishing libel tribunals (to reduce costs). The campaign quickly grew with support from over 60,000 people and 100 affiliated organisations. The broadness of the campaign's support contributed to its success with celebrity support, alongside support from GPs, scientists, academics and NGOs.

In January 2011, Deputy Prime Minister Nick Clegg said that he was committed to introducing legislation that would turn "English libel laws from an international laughing stock to an international blueprint".

On 15 March 2011, a Draft Defamation Bill (CP3/11) was published by the Ministry of Justice with an accompanying "consultation paper containing provisions for reforming the law to strike the right balance between protection of freedom of speech and protection of reputation". (Close date: 15 June 2011)

On 6 March 2013, a number of British authors and playwrights wrote an open letter to the leaders of the three biggest parties in the House of Commons, David Cameron, Nick Clegg, and Ed Miliband, calling them to ensure the Defamation Bill was passed. The letter, organised English PEN, grew out of a concern that the bill has become threatened by political disputes over the results of the Leveson Inquiry. The bill did not cover press regulation until February 2013, when Lord Puttnam won support to include a section covering newspapers.

The Defamation Act 2013 came into effect on 1 January 2014.

=== Legal aid ===
In 1979 the Royal Commission on Legal Services recommended that legal aid should be made available for proceedings in defamation. The same recommendation had previously been made in the twenty-fifth annual report of the Legal Aid Advisory Committee.

== See also ==
- Censorship in the United Kingdom
- Edward Mylius, convicted of criminal libel in 1911 after publishing a report about King George V
- Hill v. Church of Scientology of Toronto, rejection of the U.S. rule by Canada
- New York Times Co. v. Sullivan, an actual malice standard in the United States in accordance with the First Amendment
