= Defamatory libel =

Defamatory libel was originally an offence under the common law of England. It was established in England and Wales and in Northern Ireland. It was or is a form of criminal libel, a term with which it is synonymous.

== England, Wales and Northern Ireland ==
The common law offence of defamatory libel was abolished for England and Wales and Northern Ireland on 12 January 2010.

Section 4 of the Libel Act 1843 which created an aggravated statutory offence was also repealed.

=== History ===
See the following cases:

- De Libellis Famosis (1606) 5 Co Rep 125a, (1606) 77 ER 250
- Summer v Hillard (1665) 1 Sid 270, (1665) 82 ER 1099
- R v Penny (1687) 1 Ld Raym 153, 91 ER 999
- R v Burdett (1820) 4 B & Ald 95, (1820) 106 ER 873
- R v Brigstock (1833) 6 Car & P 184, (1833) 172 ER 1199
- R v Carden (1879) 5 QBD 1
- R v Wicks (1936) 25 Cr App R 168
- Goldsmith v Pressdram Ltd [1977] QB 83
- Desmond v Thorne [1983] 1 WLR 163, [1982] 3 All ER 268, Queen's Bench Division
- Vizetelly v Mudie's Select Library Ltd [1900] 2 QB 170, 16 TLR 352, Court of Appeal of England and Wales
- Gleaves v Deakin [1980] AC 477, [1979] 2 WLR 665, [1979] 2 All ER 497, 69 Cr App R 59, [1979] Crim LR 458, House of Lords

==== Jurisdiction ====
This originally vested in the Court of Star Chamber. When that court was abolished, it was transferred to the Court of King's Bench.

==== Publication in a permanent form ====
See section 4(1) of the Theatres Act 1968 and section 166(1) of the Broadcasting Act 1990.

==== Restriction on institution of proceedings ====
See section 8 of the Law of Libel Amendment Act 1888 (replacing section 3 of the Newspaper Libel and Registration Act 1881) and section 8 of the Theatres Act 1968.

==== Defences ====
See sections 6 and 7 of the Libel Act 1843 and sections 3 and 4 of the Law of Libel Amendment Act 1888.

==== Functions of judge and jury ====
See the Libel Act 1792 (32 Geo. 3. c. 60).

==== Committal proceedings – Power of magistrates to dismiss charge ====
See section 4 of the Newspaper Libel and Registration Act 1881.

==== Power of magistrates to try newspaper libel summarily with the consent of the accused ====
See section 5 of the Newspaper Libel and Registration Act 1881. That section was repealed by sections 17 and 65(5) of, and Schedule 13 to, the Criminal Law Act 1977.

==== Sentence ====
See sections 4 and 5 of the Libel Act 1843.

==== Reform ====
In 1985, the Law Commission recommended that the offence of defamatory libel should be abolished and replaced with a new statutory offence of "criminal defamation". The recommendation that a new statutory offence be created has not been implemented.

== See also ==
- Defamation
- Criminal libel
- Privilege of peerage § Scandalum magnatum
