= Newspaper Libel and Registration Act 1881 =

Act of the Parliament of the United Kingdom

Newspaper Libel and Registration Act 1881 (Note: Section 20.)
- Act of Parliament
- Parliament of the United Kingdom
- Long title: An Act to amend the Law of Newspaper Libel, and to provide for the Registration of Newspaper Proprietors.
- Citation: 44 & 45 Vict. c. 60
- Introduced by: Private Member's Bill
- Territorial extent: England and Wales; Ireland; (Note: Section 19.)

Dates
- Royal assent: 27 August 1881
- Commencement: 27 August 1881 (Note: The Acts of Parliament (Commencement) Act 1793.)
Other legislation
Amended by	Law of Libel Amendment Act 1888; Administration of Justice (Miscellaneous Provisions) Act 1933; Criminal Law Act 1977; Deregulation Act 2015
Relates to	Newspapers, Printers, and Reading Rooms Repeal Act 1869

Status: Amended

Text of statute as originally enacted

Revised text of statute as amended

Text of the Newspaper Libel and Registration Act 1881 as in force today (including any amendments) within the United Kingdom, from legislation.gov.uk.

The Newspaper Libel and Registration Act 1881 (44 & 45 Vict. c. 60) is an act of the Parliament of the United Kingdom. Introduced as a Private Member's Bill, it reduced the legislative burden on newspaper proprietors with regard to the offence of libel; as a quid pro quo, the compulsory registration of proprietors (abolished by the Newspapers, Printers, and Reading Rooms Repeal Act 1869 (32 & 33 Vict. c. 24)) was reintroduced.

Following the removal of compulsory registration in 1869, newspaper owners had begun to look to anonymity as a protection against lawsuits arising out of the publication of libellous statements. At the same time, the judgment in Purcell v Sowler (1877) saw a newspaper proprietor successfully sued despite recognition that the libellous statements his newspaper had published were merely quoted verbatim from the testimony of a member of the public made at public meeting. Against this backdrop, two successive select committees were established to look at the law of libel; the first made no report, but the second took on the evidence of the first, and made several recommendations. In the words of John Hutchinson, MP for Halifax, "the Bill embodied the recommendations of [the second] Committee, and was confined to them exclusively". The bill itself took the form of a Private Member's Bill.

In terms of content, section 2 of the act (as it became when it received royal assent on 27 August 1881) introduced a new defence for newspaper proprietors in cases where the libel stemmed from a fair, accurate and non-malicious report of a publicly held meeting. This extension of qualified privilege was then "amplified" by the Law of Libel Amendment Act 1888 (51 & 52 Vict. c. 64), which in doing so repealed section 2 of the 1881 act. Repealed at the same time was section 3 ("No prosecution for newspaper libel without fiat of Attorney General"). The act also benefited newspaper owners insofar as it instituted provisions (section 4, 5 and 6) for the quicker (and hence cheaper) resolution of newspaper libel cases. Contrary to expectations, however, the passage of the act correlated with an increase, rather than decrease, in the number of defamatory libel (criminal) actions being brought against newspapers. Whether the two were causally linked is not known, however.

In return, proprietors were happy to accept the reintroduction of compulsory registration that had been removed in 1869 (now provided for by sections 7 to 15 of the 1881 act inclusive). These registration clauses, which included an exemption for proprietors who are already registered companies, were not repealed until 2015 and were still enforced. For the purposes of the act, a newspaper is defined as "any paper containing public news, intelligence, or occurrences, or any remarks or observations therein printed for sale, and published ... periodically, or in parts or numbers at intervals not exceeding 26 days". As of 2009, 56 newspapers and their proprietors were centrally registered as a result of these provisions. Under section 19 of the act, it never applied to Scotland.

The provisions on registration in sections 7 to 18 were repealed by the Deregulation Act 2015 as being no longer of practical use. As a result, only section 4 remains in force, and that only in relation to Northern Ireland and courts hearing charges there of blasphemous libel.
