= Defamation Act =

Stock short title used for legislation

Defamation Act (with its variations) is a stock short title used for legislation in Australia, Hong Kong, Malaysia, New Zealand, the Republic of Ireland and the United Kingdom relating to defamation. It supersedes the short title Libel Act.

The Bill for an Act with this short title will have been known as a Defamation Bill during its passage through Parliament.

Defamation Acts may be a generic name either for legislation bearing that short title or for all legislation which relates to defamation.

== List ==
=== Australia ===
==== Australian Capital Territory ====
- The Defamation Act 2001

==== New South Wales ====
- The Defamation Act Amendment Act 1886
- The Defamation Act 1901 (No 22)
- The Defamation (Amendment) Act 1909 (No 22)
- The Defamation Act 1912 (No 32)
- The Defamation (Amendment) Act 1917 (No 14)
- The Defamation (Amendment) Act 1940 (No 4)
- The Defamation Act 1958 (No 39)
- The Defamation Act 1974 (No 74)
- The Defamation (Amendment) Act 1978 (No 79)
- The Defamation (Trotting Authority) Amendment Act 1978 (No 125)
- The Defamation (Legal Services Commission) Amendment Act 1979 (No 80)
- The Defamation (Anti-Discrimination) Amendment Act 1980 (No 68)
- The Defamation (Anti-Discrimination) Amendment Act 1981 (No 16)
- The Defamation (Community Welfare) Amendment Act 1982 (No 82)
- The Defamation (Farm Produce) Amendment Act 1983 (No 31)
- The Defamation (Probation and Parole) Amendment Act 1983 (No 196)
- The Defamation (Racing Appeals Tribunal) Amendment Act 1983 (No 200)
- The Defamation (Commissioner of Public Complaints) Amendment Act 1984 (No 78)
- The Defamation (Law Reform Commission) Amendment Act 1984 (No 118)
- The Defamation (Workers Compensation) Amendment Act 1987 (No 75)
- The Defamation (Medical Practitioners) Amendment Act 1987 (No 128)
- The Defamation (Criminal Defamation) Amendment Act 1988 (No 61)
- The Defamation (Independent Commission Against Corruption) Amendment Act 1989 (No 29)
- The Defamation (Amendment) Act 1994 (No 93)
- The Defamation Amendment Act 2002 (No 136)
- The Defamation Act 2005 (No 77)
- The Defamation Amendment Act 2020 (No 16)

==== Northern Territory ====
- The Defamation Amendment Act 1989 (No 49)
- The Defamation Act 2006

==== Queensland ====
- The Defamation Act 1889 (53 Vic No 12)
- The Defamation Law of Queensland Amendment Act of 1930 (21 Geo 5 No 10)
- The Defamation Act 2005 (No 55)
- The Defamation (Model Provisions) and Other Legislation Amendment Act 2021 (No 13)

==== South Australia ====
- The Act 26 & 27 Vic No 16 (An Act to amend the Law relating to Defamatory Words)
- The Defamation Act 2005 (No 50)
- The Defamation (Miscellaneous) Amendment Act 2020 (No 41)

==== Tasmania ====
- The Defamation Act 1957 (No 42)
- The Defamation Act 2005 (No 73)

==== Victoria ====
- The Defamation Act 2005 (No 75)

=== Western Australia ===
- The Defamation Act 2005 (No 44)

=== Hong Kong ===
- The Defamation Ordinance 1887

=== Malaysia ===
- The Defamation Act 1957

=== New Zealand ===
- The Defamation Act 1954 (No 46)
- The Defamation Amendment Act 1958 (No 63)
- The Defamation Amendment Act 1971 (No 94)
- The Defamation Amendment Act 1974 (No 82)
- The Defamation Act 1992 (No 105)

=== Republic of Ireland ===
- The Defamation Act 1961 (No.40)
- The Defamation Act 2009

=== United Kingdom ===
- The Defamation Act 1952 (15 & 16 Geo. 6 & 1 Eliz. 2. c. 66)
- The Defamation Act 1996 (c. 31)
- The Defamation Act 2013 (c. 26)

==== Northern Ireland ====
- The Defamation Act (Northern Ireland) 1955 (c. 11) (N.I.)
- The Defamation Act (Northern Ireland) 2022 (c. 30) (N.I.)

==== Scotland ====
- The Defamation and Malicious Publication (Scotland) Act 2021 (asp 10)

== See also ==
- List of short titles
