= Defamation Act (Northern Ireland) 1955 =

Defamation Act (Northern Ireland) 1955 (Note: Section 16(1).)
- Act of Parliament
- Parliament of Northern Ireland
- Long title: An Act to amend the law relating to libel and slander and other malicious falsehoods.
- Citation: 1955 c. 11 (N.I.)
- Territorial extent: Northern Ireland

Dates
- Royal assent: 21 June 1955

Other legislation
- Amends: Law of Libel Amendment Act 1888
- Amended by: Defamation Act 1996; Scotland Act 1998; Government of Wales Act 2006

Status: Amended

Text of statute as originally enacted

Revised text of statute as amended

Text of the Defamation Act (Northern Ireland) 1955 as in force today (including any amendments) within the United Kingdom, from legislation.gov.uk.

The Defamation Act (Northern Ireland) 1955 (c. 11 (N.I.)) is an act of the Parliament of Northern Ireland. This act makes similar provision for Northern Ireland as the Defamation Act 1952 which applies only to England, Wales and Scotland.

The power of the Northern Ireland parliament to make laws for purposes similar to the purposes of the 1952 Act derived from Section 15 of that law.

== Legislative passage ==
Unlike the corresponding Westminster legislation, the act was passed as a government bill.

== Provisions ==
The act mirrored the Defamation Act 1952. Originally the act treated libel as a crime as well as a tort, but this was amended by the Coroners and Justice Act 2009.

== See also ==
- Defamation Act
