= Unlawful Societies Act 1799 =

Act of the Parliament of Great Britain

Unlawful Societies Act 1799 (Note: The citation of this act by this short title was authorised by section 1 of, and the first schedule to, the Short Titles Act 1896. Due to the repeal of those provisions it is now authorised by section 19(2) of the Interpretation Act 1978.)
- Act of Parliament
- Parliament of Great Britain
- Long title: An act for the more effectual suppression of societies established for seditious and treasonable purposes; and for better preventing treasonable and seditions practices.
- Citation: 39 Geo. 3. c. 79
- Territorial extent: Great Britain

Dates
- Royal assent: 12 July 1799
- Commencement: 12 July 1799 (Note: The Acts of Parliament (Commencement) Act 1793.)
- Repealed: 21 July 1967
Other legislation
Amended by	Printers and Publishers Act 1811; Printers and Publishers Act 1839; Newspapers, Printers, and Reading Rooms Repeal Act 1869; Statute Law Revision Act 1871; Summary Jurisdiction Act 1884; Statute Law Revision Act 1887; Statute Law Revision Act 1888; Public Authorities Protection Act 1893; Justices of the Peace Act 1949
Repealed by	Criminal Law Act 1967

Status: Repealed

Text of statute as originally enacted

The Unlawful Societies Act 1799 (39 Geo. 3. c. 79) was an act of the Parliament of Great Britain passed in 1799, as part of measures by Pitt the Younger to suppress republican opposition. It is also sometimes referred to as the Corresponding Societies Act or Seditious Societies Act.

== Provisions ==
The Combination Act 1799 (39 Geo. 3. c. 81) is sometimes confused with the present act, possibly because that act followed the present act in close proximity.

The act was aimed at restricting the activities of radical secret societies like the London Corresponding Society and Society of United Irishmen. The LCS, United Irishmen, United Englishmen, United Britons and United Scots were proscribed by the act. To prevent similar societies springing up, it was made illegal for any society to require its members to take an oath. Societies were also required to keep lists of members available for inspection. A magistrate's licence was required for any premises on which public lectures were held or any fee-charging public reading room. Printers were closely regulated, because one of the main problems in the Government's view was that seditious pamphlets were widely circulated and untraceable. Anyone possessing printing equipment was required to register, while all printed items were required to carry the name and address of the printer on the title-page and/or the final page (see colophon), and printers were required to declare all items they had printed to magistrates and retain copies for inspection.

During the passage of the bill exemptions were introduced to avoid unwanted consequences of the broadly-drafted law. Papers that Parliament itself had ordered to be printed, for instance, were not required to carry an imprint. Freemasons, who required members to swear oaths upon joining, successfully lobbied to avoid their society being banned. In the end any Masonic lodge existing at the time of passage of the act was exempted, so long as they maintained a list of members and supplied it to the magistrates.

== Subsequent developments ==
The act was not particularly effective, as radical political organisations continued in more secret or less formal ways. Even where prosecutions could have been made under the act, other legislation was preferred. Significant parts of the law were repealed under the Newspapers Printers and Reading Rooms Repeal Act 1869 (32 & 33 Vict. c. 24), while others continued in force (albeit obsolete and deprecated) until the Criminal Justice Act 1967. The most long-lived provision of the act has been the requirement for printers to place an "imprint" on their work. This provision was relaxed in the Printer's Imprint Act 1961 (9 & 10 Eliz. 2. c. 31) to exclude simple documents like greeting cards or invoice books. At that time, some unscrupulous customers apparently instructed printers to omit their imprints, and then refused to pay their bills on the grounds that the work had been conducted illegally. The imprint requirement as amended in 1961 is technically still in force, but widely considered obsolete. A similar, but more detailed, provision was introduced in section 143 of the Political Parties, Elections and Referendums Act 2000 to require the disclosure of printer, publisher and promoter of any material produced as part of an election campaign.

Sections 15–33, and so much of " sections 34–39 as relates to those sections, was repealed by section 1 of, and the first schedule to, the Newspapers, Printers, and Reading Rooms Repeal Act 1869 (32 & 33 Vict. c. 24), which came into force on 12 July 1869.

Sections 4, 11 from "save" to the end, and 12 and 39 of the act were repealed by section 1 of, and the schedule to, the Statute Law Revision Act 1871 (34 & 35 Vict. c. 116), which came into force on 21 August 1871.

Section 37 of the act was repealed by section 2 of, and the schedule to, the Public Authorities Protection Act 1893 (56 & 57 Vict. c. 61), which came into force on 1 January 1894.

The whole act was repealed by section 13(2) of, and part I of schedule 4 to, the Criminal Law Act 1967, which came into force on 21 July 1967.
