= List of Scottish statutory instruments, 2001 =

This is a complete list of Scottish statutory instruments in 2001.

== 1-100 ==
- Cattle (Identification of Older Animals) (Scotland) Regulations 2001 (S.S.I. 2001/1)
- Advice and Assistance (Assistance by Way of Representation) (Scotland) Amendment Regulations 2001 (S.S.I. 2001/2)
- Specified Risk Material Amendment (Scotland) Regulations 2001 (S.S.I. 2001/3)
- Specified Risk Material Order Amendment (Scotland) Regulations 2001 (S.S.I. 2001/4)
- National Assistance (Assessment of Resources) Amendment (Scotland) Regulations 2001 (S.S.I. 2001/6)
- Budget (Scotland) Act 2000 (Amendment) Order 2001 (S.S.I. 2001/7)
- Act of Sederunt (Ordinary Cause Rules) Amendment (Commercial Actions) 2001 (S.S.I. 2001/8)
- Food Protection (Emergency Prohibitions) (Amnesic Shellfish Poisoning) (West Coast) (No. 6) (Scotland) Revocation Order 2001 (S.S.I. 2001/9)
- Food Protection (Emergency Prohibitions) (Amnesic Shellfish Poisoning) (West Coast) (No. 2) (Scotland) Partial Revocation Order 2001 (S.S.I. 2001/10)
- Food Protection (Emergency Prohibitions) (Amnesic Shellfish Poisoning) (West Coast) (Scotland) Revocation Order 2001 (S.S.I. 2001/11)
- A1 Trunk Road (Dolphingstone Southbound Off-Slip Road) (Temporary Prohibition of Traffic) Order 2001 (S.S.I. 2001/13)
- A1 Trunk Road (Haddington West Interchange to Haddington East Interchange) (Temporary Prohibition of Traffic) Order 2001 (S.S.I. 2001/14)
- A77 Trunk Road (Turnberry) (40 mph Speed Limit) Order 2001 (S.S.I. 2001/15)
- Smoke Control Areas (Exempt Fireplaces) (Scotland) Order 2001 (S.S.I. 2001/16)
- General Teaching Council (Scotland) Election Scheme 2001 Approval Order 2001 (S.S.I. 2001/18)
- Local Government Pension Scheme (Pension Sharing on Divorce) (Scotland) Regulations 2001 (S.S.I. 2001/23)
- Food Protection (Emergency Prohibitions) (Amnesic Shellfish Poisoning) (West Coast) (No. 2) (Scotland) Partial Revocation (No. 2) Order 2001 (S.S.I. 2001/24)
- Environmentally Sensitive Areas (Central Borders) Designation Amendment Order 2001 (S.S.I. 2001/25)
- Environmentally Sensitive Areas (Stewartry) Designation Amendment Order 2001 (S.S.I. 2001/26)
- Environmentally Sensitive Areas (Argyll Islands) Designation Amendment Order 2001 (S.S.I. 2001/27)
- Environmentally Sensitive Areas (Machair of the Uists and Benbecula, Barra and Vatersay) Designation Amendment Order 2001 (S.S.I. 2001/28)
- Environmentally Sensitive Areas (Shetland Islands) DesignationAmendment Order 2001 (S.S.I. 2001/29)
- Environmentally Sensitive Areas (Breadalbane) Designation Amendment Order 2001 (S.S.I. 2001/30)
- Environmentally Sensitive Areas (Western Southern Uplands) Designation Amendment Order 2001 (S.S.I. 2001/31)
- Environmentally Sensitive Areas (Central Southern Uplands) Designation Amendment Order 2001 (S.S.I. 2001/32)
- Environmentally Sensitive Areas (Cairngorms Straths) Designation Amendment Order 2001 (S.S.I. 2001/33)
- Environmentally Sensitive Areas (Loch Lomond) Designation Amendment Order 2001 (S.S.I. 2001/34)
- European Communities (Matrimonial Jurisdiction and Judgments) (Scotland) Regulations 2001 (S.S.I. 2001/36)
- Housing Revenue Account General Fund Contribution Limits (Scotland) Order 2001 (S.S.I. 2001/37)
- Coffee Extracts and Chicory Extracts (Scotland) Regulations 2001 (S.S.I. 2001/38)
- Designation of UHI Millennium Institute (Scotland) Order 2001 (S.S.I. 2001/39)
- Highland and Islands Agricultural Processing and Marketing Grants Etc. (Scotland) Regulations 2001 (S.S.I. 2001/40)
- Number of Inner House Judges (Variation) Order 2001 (S.S.I. 2001/41)
- Legal Aid (Scotland) Act 1986 Amendment Regulations 2001 (S.S.I. 2001/42)
- Advice and Assistance (Assistance by Way of Representation) (Scotland) Amendment (No. 2) Regulations 2001 (S.S.I. 2001/43)
- Non-Domestic Rate (Scotland) Order 2001 (S.S.I. 2001/44)
- Diseases of Animals (Approved Disinfectants) Amendment (Scotland) Order 2001 (S.S.I. 2001/45)
- A80 Trunk Road (Muirhead Traffic Lights) (30 mph Speed Limit) Order 2001 (S.S.I. 2001/46)
- A80 Trunk Road (Muirhead and Moodiesburn) (50 mph Speed Limit) Order 2001 (S.S.I. 2001/47)
- Foot-and-Mouth Disease Declaratory (Controlled Area) (Scotland) Order 2001 (S.S.I. 2001/49)
- Less Favoured Area Support Scheme (Scotland) Regulations 2001 (S.S.I. 2001/50)
- Diseases of Animals (Approved Disinfectants) Amendment (No. 2) (Scotland) Order 2001 (S.S.I. 2001/51)
- Foot-and-Mouth Disease (Amendment) (Scotland) Order 2001 (S.S.I. 2001/52)
- Food Protection (Emergency Prohibitions) (Paralytic Shellfish Poisoning) (Orkney) (Scotland) Revocation Order 2001 (S.S.I. 2001/53)
- Nurses, Midwives and Health Visitors (Professional Conduct) (Amendment) Rules 2001 Approval (Scotland) Order 2001 (S.S.I. 2001/54)
- Foot-and-Mouth Disease (Amendment) (No. 2) (Scotland) Order 2001 (S.S.I. 2001/55)
- Foot-and-Mouth Disease (Scotland) Declaratory Order 2001 (S.S.I. 2001/56)
- National Health Service (General Dental Services) (Scotland) Amendment Regulations 2001 (S.S.I. 2001/57)
- National Health Service (Primary Care) Act 1997 (Commencement No. 7) (Scotland) Order 2001 (S.S.I. 2001/58)
- Foot-and-Mouth Disease (Scotland) Declaratory (No. 2) Order 2001 (S.S.I. 2001/59)
- Foot-and-Mouth Disease Declaratory (Controlled Area) (Scotland) (No. 2) Order 2001 (S.S.I. 2001/60)
- Export Restrictions (Foot-and-Mouth Disease) Amendment (Scotland) Regulations 2001 (S.S.I. 2001/61)
- National Health Service (General Ophthalmic Services) (Scotland) Amendment Regulations 2001 (S.S.I. 2001/62)
- Foot-and-Mouth Disease (Scotland) Declaratory Amendment Order 2001 (S.S.I. 2001/63)
- Discontinuance of Legalised Police Cells (Portree) Rules 2001 (S.S.I. 2001/64)
- Foot-and-Mouth Disease (Scotland) Declaratory (Amendment No. 2) Order 2001 (S.S.I. 2001/65)
- Foot-and-Mouth Disease (Scotland) (Declaratory and Controlled Area) Amendment Order 2001 (S.S.I. 2001/66)
- National Health Service (Charges for Drugs and Appliances) (Scotland) Amendment Regulations 2001 (S.S.I. 2001/67)
- Budget (Scotland) Act 2000 (Amendment) (No. 2) Order 2001 (S.S.I. 2001/68)
- National Health Service (Dental Charges) (Scotland) Amendment Regulations 2001 (S.S.I. 2001/69)
- National Health Service (Pharmaceutical Services) (Scotland) Amendment Regulations 2001 (S.S.I. 2001/70)
- Non-Domestic Rates (Levying) (Scotland) Regulations 2001 (S.S.I. 2001/71)
- National Health Service (Personal Medical Services) (Scotland) Regulations 2001 (S.S.I. 2001/72)
- Restriction on Pithing (Scotland) Regulations 2001 (S.S.I. 2001/73)
- Police Grant (Scotland) Order 2001 (S.S.I. 2001/74)
- Adults with Incapacity (Public Guardian's Fees) (Scotland) Regulations 2001 (S.S.I. 2001/75)
- Adults with Incapacity (Certificates from Medical Practitioners) (Accounts and Funds) (Scotland) Regulations 2001 (S.S.I. 2001/76)
- Adults with Incapacity (Supervision of Welfare Attorneys by Local Authorities) (Scotland) Regulations 2001 (S.S.I. 2001/77)
- Adults with Incapacity (Countersignatories of Applications for Authority to Intromit) (Scotland) Regulations 2001 (S.S.I. 2001/78)
- Adults with Incapacity (Evidence in Relation to Dispensing with Intimation or Notification) (Scotland) Regulations 2001 (S.S.I. 2001/79)
- Adults with Incapacity (Certificates in Relation to Powers of Attorney) (Scotland) Regulations 2001 (S.S.I. 2001/80)
- Adults with Incapacity (Scotland) Act 2000 (Commencement No. 1) Order 2001 (S.S.I. 2001/81)
- Civil Legal Aid (Scotland) Amendment Regulations 2001 (S.S.I. 2001/82)
- Gaming Act (Variation of Fees) (Scotland) Order 2001 (S.S.I. 2001/83)
- Pesticides (Maximum Residue Levels in Crops, Food and Feeding Stuffs) (Scotland) Amendment Regulations 2001 (S.S.I. 2001/84)
- National Health Service (Choice of Medical Practitioner) (Scotland) Amendment Regulations 2001 (S.S.I. 2001/85)
- Specified Risk Material Amendment (No. 2) (Scotland) Regulations 2001 (S.S.I. 2001/86)
- Regulation of Investigatory Powers (Prescription of Offices, Ranks and Positions) (Scotland) Amendment Order 2001 (S.S.I. 2001/87)
- National Health Service (Optical Charges and Payments) (Scotland) Amendment Regulations 2001 (S.S.I. 2001/88)
- Meat (Hygiene and Inspection) (Charges) Amendment (Scotland) Regulations 2001 (S.S.I. 2001/89)
- Foot-and-Mouth Disease (Scotland) (Declaratory and Controlled Area) Amendment (No. 2) Order 2001 (S.S.I. 2001/90)
- Foot-and-Mouth Disease (Scotland) Declaratory (Amendment) (No. 3) Order 2001 (S.S.I. 2001/91)
- Act of Sederunt (Rules of the Court of Session Amendment No. 2) (Assistance In Investigations Undertaken by European Commission Into Certain Prohibited Practices and Abuses) 2001 (S.S.I. 2001/92)
- Act of Sederunt (Rules of the Court of Session Amendment No. 1) (Procedure for Offers to Make Amends) 2001 (S.S.I. 2001/93)
- Import and Export Restrictions (Foot-and-Mouth Disease) (Scotland) Regulations 2001 (S.S.I. 2001/95)
- Local Government Finance (Scotland) Order 2001 (S.S.I. 2001/96)
- A1 Trunk Road (Haddington West Interchange to Haddington East Interchange) (Temporary Prohibition of Traffic) (No. 2) Order 2001 (S.S.I. 2001/97)
- Defamation Act 1996 (Commencement No. 3 and Transitional Provision) (Scotland) Order 2001 (S.S.I. 2001/98)
- Environmental Protection Act 1990 (Amendment) (Scotland) Regulations 2001 (S.S.I. 2001/99)
- National Assistance (Sums for Personal Requirements) (Scotland) Regulations 2001 (S.S.I. 2001/100)

== 101-200 ==
- Foot-and-Mouth Disease (Amendment) (No. 3) (Scotland) Order 2001 (S.S.I. 2001/101)
- Standards in Scotland's Schools etc. Act 2000 (Commencement No. 4) Order 2001 (S.S.I. 2001/102)
- Miscellaneous Food Additives (Amendment) (Scotland) Regulations 2001 (S.S.I. 2001/103)
- Feeding Stuffs (Sampling and Analysis) Amendment (Scotland) Regulations 2001 (S.S.I. 2001/104)
- National Assistance (Assessment of Resources) Amendment (No. 2) (Scotland) Regulations 2001 (S.S.I. 2001/105)
- A74(M) Motorway (Northbound and Southbound Off-Slip Roads at Junction 14 (Elvangort and Crauford) (Temporary Prohibition of Traffic) Order 2001 (S.S.I. 2001/106

A74(M) Motorway, (Northbound Off-Slip Road at Junction 15 (Beattock) and Southbound Off-Slip Road at Junction 16 (Johnstonbridge)) (Temporary Prohibition of Traffic) Order 2001 (S.S.I. 2001/107)

- A74(M)/M74 Motorway (Northbound and Southbound Off-Slip Roads at Junction 13 (Abington)) (Temporary Prohibition of Traffic) Order 2001 (S.S.I. 2001/108)
- Foot-and-Mouth Disease (Scotland) (Declaratory Orders) General Amendment Order 2001 (S.S.I. 2001/109)
- Foot-and-Mouth Disease (Scotland) Declaratory (Amendment) (No. 4) Order 2001 (S.S.I. 2001/110)
- Foot-and-Mouth Disease Declaratory (Controlled Area) (Scotland) (No. 3) Order 2001 (S.S.I. 2001/111)
- Import and Export Restrictions (Foot-and-Mouth Disease) (Scotland) Amendment Regulations 2001 (S.S.I. 2001/112)
- Ethical Standards in Public Life etc. (Scotland) Act 2000 (Commencement No. 1) Order 2001 (S.S.I. 2001/113)
- Domestic Water and Sewerage Charges (Reduction) (Scotland) Regulations 2001 (S.S.I. 2001/114)
- Valuation for Rating (Plant and Machinery) (Scotland) Amendment Regulations 2001 (S.S.I. 2001/115)
- Salmon Conservation (Scotland) Act 2001 (Commencement) Order 2001 (S.S.I. 2001/116)
- Sea Fishing (Enforcement of Community Quota and Third Country Fishing Measures) (Scotland) Order 2001 (S.S.I. 2001/117)
- National Health Service (General Medical Services) (Scotland) Amendment Regulations 2001 (S.S.I. 2001/119)
- Foot-and-Mouth Disease (Ascertainment of Value) (Scotland) Order 2001 (S.S.I. 2001/120)
- Foot-and-Mouth Disease (Ascertainment of Value) (Scotland) (No. 2) Order 2001 (S.S.I. 2001/121)
- Foot-and-Mouth Disease (Scotland) Declaratory (Amendment) (No. 5) Order 2001 (S.S.I. 2001/122)
- Civil Legal Aid (Financial Conditions) (Scotland) Regulations 2001 (S.S.I. 2001/123)
- Advice and Assistance (Financial Conditions) (Scotland) Regulations 2001 (S.S.I. 2001/124)
- Liquor Licensing (Fees) (Scotland) Order 2001 (S.S.I. 2001/125)
- Highlands and Islands Enterprise Area of Operation (Scotland) Order 2001 (S.S.I. 2001/126)
- Import and Export Restrictions (Foot-and-Mouth Disease) (Scotland) Amendment (No. 2) Regulations 2001 (S.S.I. 2001/127)
- Limited Liability Partnerships (Scotland) Regulations 2001 (S.S.I. 2001/128)
- Housing Support Grant (Scotland) Order 2001 (S.S.I. 2001/129)
- Foot-and-Mouth Disease (Ascertainment of Value) (Scotland) (No. 3) Order 2001 (S.S.I. 2001/130)
- Foot-and-Mouth Disease Declaratory (Controlled Area) (Scotland) (No. 3) Amendment Order 2001 (S.S.I. 2001/131)
- Transport (Scotland) Act 2001 (Commencement No. 1, Transitional Provisions and Savings) Order 2001 (S.S.I. 2001/132)
- A84 Trunk Road (Kilmahog) (40 mph Speed Limit) Order 2001 (S.S.I. 2001/ 133)
- Food Protection (Emergency Prohibitions) (Amnesic Shellfish Poisoning) (West Coast) (No. 2) (Scotland) Revocation Order 2001 (S.S.I. 2001/134)
- Act of Sederunt (Rules of the Court of Session Amendment No. 3 ) (Fees of Shorthand Writers) 2001 (S.S.I. 2001/135)
- Act of Sederunt (Fees of Shorthand Writers in the Sheriff Court) (Amendment) 2001 (S.S.I. 2001/136)
- NHS 24 (Scotland) Order 2001 (S.S.I. 2001/137)
- National Assistance (Assessment of Resources) Amendment (No. 3) (Scotland) Regulations 2001 (S.S.I. 2001/138)
- Civil Defence (Scotland) Regulations 2001 (S.S.I. 2001/139)
- Fisheries and Aquaculture Structures (Grants) (Scotland) Regulations 2001 (S.S.I. 2001/140)
- Import and Export Restrictions (Foot-and-Mouth Disease) (Scotland) Amendment (No. 3) Regulations 2001 (S.S.I. 2001/141)
- Act of Sederunt (Summary Applications, Statutory Applications and Appeals etc. Rules) Amendment (Adults with Incapacity) 2001 (S.S.I. 2001/142)
- Act of Sederunt (Child Support Rules) Amendment 2001 (S.S.I. 2001/143)
- Act of Sederunt (Ordinary Cause Rules) Amendment (European Matrimonial and Parental Responsibility Jurisdiction and Judgments) 2001 (S.S.I. 2001/144)
- Welfare of Animals (Slaughter or Killing) Amendment (Scotland) Regulations 2001 (S.S.I. 2001/145)
- Foot-and-Mouth Disease (Scotland) (Declaratory and Controlled Area) Amendment (No. 3) Order 2001 (S.S.I. 2001/146)
- A68 Trunk Road (Soutra Hill) (Side Roads) Order S.S.I. 2001/147)
- Foot-and-Mouth Disease (Scotland) Declaratory (Amendment) (No. 6) Order 2001 (S.S.I. 2001/148)
- Foot-and-Mouth Disease (Scotland) Declaratory (Amendment) (No. 7) Order 2001 (S.S.I. 2001/149)
- Foot-and-Mouth Disease Declaratory (Controlled Area) (Scotland) (No. 3) Amendment (No. 2) Order 2001 (S.S.I. 2001/150)
- Western Isles Salmon Fishery District Designation Order 2001 (S.S.I. 2001/151)
- Teachers' Superannuation (Pension Sharing on Divorce) (Scotland) Regulations 2001 152)
- Foot-and-Mouth Disease (Scotland) Declaratory (No. 3) Order 2001 (S.S.I. 2001/153)
- A95 Trunk Road (Kinveachy Junction Improvements) (Side Roads) Order S.S.I. 2001/154)
- A1 Edinburgh to Berwick Upon Tweed Trunk Road (Southbound On-Slip at the Bankton Interchange, Southbound Off-Slip at the B6363 Gladsmuir Interchange, Southbound On-Slip at the B6363 Gladsmuir Interchange) (Temporary Prohibition of Traffic) Order 2001 (S.S.I. 2001/155)
- A1 Edinburgh to Berwick Upon Tweed Trunk Road (Northbound Off-Slip at the A198 Bankton Interchange, Northbound On-Slip at the B6363 Gladsmuir Interchange, Northbound Off-Slip at the B6363 Gladsmuir Interchange) (Temporary Prohibition of Traffic) Order 2001 (S.S.I. 2001/156)
- Foot-and-Mouth Disease (Scotland) Declaratory (No. 4) Order 2001 (S.S.I. 2001/157)
- Import and Export Restrictions (Foot-and-Mouth Disease) (Scotland) Amendment (No. 4) Regulations 2001 (S.S.I. 2001/158)
- Foot-and-Mouth Disease (Scotland) (Declaratory and Controlled Area) Amendment (No. 4) Order 2001 (S.S.I. 2001/159)
- Foot-and-Mouth Disease (Marking of Meat and Meat Products) (Scotland) Regulations 2001 (S.S.I. 2001/160)
- Plant Protection Products Amendment (Scotland) Regulations 2001 (S.S.I. 2001/161)
- Milk and Milk Products (Pupils in Educational Establishments) (Scotland) Regulations 2001 (S.S.I. 2001/162)
- Fees in the Registers of Scotland Amendment Order 2001 (S.S.I. 2001/163)
- Town and Country Planning (Limit of Annual Value) (Scotland) Order 2001 (S.S.I. 2001/164)
- Foot-and-Mouth Disease (Scotland) Declaratory (No. 5) Order 2001 (S.S.I. 2001/165)
- Criminal Justice and Court Services Act 2000 (Commencement No. 5) (Scotland) Order 2001 (S.S.I. 2001/166)
- Transport (Scotland) Act 2001 (Commencement No. 2) Order 2001 (S.S.I. 2001/167)
- Foot-and-Mouth Disease (Scotland) Declaratory (No. 6) Order 2001 (S.S.I. 2001/168)
- Gelatine (Intra-Community Trade) (Scotland) Regulations 2001 (S.S.I. 2001/169)
- Foot-and-Mouth Disease Declaratory (Controlled Area) (Scotland) (No. 3) Amendment (No. 3) Order 2001 (S.S.I. 2001/170)
- Animal By-Products Amendment (Scotland) Order 2001 (S.S.I. 2001/171)
- European Communities (Service of Judicial and Extrajudicial Documents) (Scotland) Regulations 2001 (S.S.I. 2001/172)
- Sex Offenders (Notification Requirements) (Prescribed Police Stations) (Scotland) Regulations 2001 (S.S.I. 2001/173)
- Inshore Fishing (Prohibition of Fishing and Fishing Methods) (Scotland) Amendment Order 2001 (S.S.I. 2001/174)
- Water (Prevention of Pollution) (Code of Practice) (Scotland) Amendment Order 2001 (S.S.I. 2001/175)
- Trunk Roads (Restricted Roads) (Wigtownshire) (Variation) Order 2001 (S.S.I. 2001/176)
- A1 Edinburgh to Berwick Upon Tweed Trunk Road (Northbound On-Slip at the Oaktree Interchange, Northbound Off-Slip at the Oaktree Interchange) (Temporary Prohibition of Traffic) Order 2001 (S.S.I. 2001/177)
- Import and Export Restrictions (Foot-and-Mouth Disease) (Scotland) Amendment (No. 5) Regulations 2001 (S.S.I. 2001/178)
- Artificial Insemination of Cattle (Emergency Licences) (Scotland) Regulations 2001 (S.S.I. 2001/179)
- Foot-and-Mouth Disease (Scotland) Declaratory (No. 5) Amendment Order 2001 (S.S.I. 2001/180)
- Foot-and-Mouth Disease Declaratory (Controlled Area) (Scotland) (No. 3) Amendment (No. 4) Order 2001 (S.S.I. 2001/181)
- A1 Edinburgh to Berwick Upon Tweed Trunk Road (Southbound On-Slip at the Oaktree Interchange, Southbound Off-Slip at the Oaktree Interchange) (Temporary Prohibition of Traffic) Order 2001 (S.S.I. 2001/182)
- A1 Edinburgh to Berwick Upon Tweed Trunk Road (Haddington East Interchange to the Oaketree Interchange) (Temporary Prohibition of Traffic) Order 2001 (S.S.I. 2001/183)
- A90 (M90) Trunk Road (Glamis Junction) (Side Roads) Order S.S.I. 2001/184)
- Import and Export Restrictions (Foot-and-Mouth Disease) (Scotland) (No. 2) Regulations 2001 (S.S.I. 2001/186)
- Foot-and-Mouth Disease (Scotland) (Declaratory and Controlled Area) Amendment (No. 5) Order 2001 (S.S.I. 2001/187)
- Sex Offenders (Notice Requirements) (Foreign Travel) (Scotland) Regulations 2001 (S.S.I. 2001/188)
- Rendering (Fluid Treatment) (Scotland) Order 2001 (S.S.I. 2001/189)
- Sex Offenders (Notification Requirements) (Prescribed Police Stations) (Scotland) (No. 2) Regulations 2001 (S.S.I. 2001/190)
- Education (Graduate Endowment and Student Support) (Scotland) Act 2001 (Commencement) Order 2001 (S.S.I. 2001/191)
- Foot-and-Mouth Disease (Scotland) Declaratory (No.5) Amendment (No. 2) Order 2001 (S.S.I. 2001/192)
- Foot-and-Mouth Disease (Scotland) Declaratory (No. 7) Order 2001 (S.S.I. 2001/193)
- Foot-and-Mouth Disease (Scotland) Declaratory (No. 6) Amendment Order 2001 (S.S.I. 2001/194)
- Food Protection (Emergency Prohibitions) (Paralytic Shellfish Poisoning) (Orkney) (Scotland) Order 2001 (S.S.I. 2001/195)
- Foot-and-Mouth Disease (Scotland) Declaratory (No. 6) Amendment (No. 2) Order 2001 (S.S.I. 2001/196)
- A90 (M90) Trunk Road (Kirriemuir Junction) (Side Roads) Order S.S.I. 2001/197)
- Designation of Bell College of Technology (Scotland) Order 2001 (S.S.I. 2001/199)

== 201-300 ==
- Plant Protection Products Amendment (No. 2) (Scotland) Regulations 2001 (S.S.I. 2001/202)
- Foot-and-Mouth Disease (Scotland) Declaratory (No. 5) Amendment (No. 3) Order 2001 (S.S.I. 2001/203)
- Foot-and-Mouth Disease (Scotland) (Declaratory and Controlled Area) Amendment (No. 6) Order 2001 (S.S.I. 2001/204)
- Part-Time Sheriffs (Removal Tribunal) Regulations 2001 (S.S.I. 2001/205)
- Control of Pollution (Silage, Slurry and Agricultural Fuel Oil) (Scotland) Regulations 2001 (S.S.I. 2001/206)
- Water Supply (Water Quality) (Scotland) Regulations 2001 (S.S.I. 2001/207)
- Crofting Community Development Scheme (Scotland) Regulations 2001 (S.S.I. 2001/208)
- Sports Grounds and Sporting Events (Designation) (Scotland) Amendment Order 2001 (S.S.I. 2001/209)
- Education (Student Loans) Amendment (Scotland) Regulations 2001 (S.S.I. 2001/210)
- Education (Student Loans) Amendment (Scotland) Regulations 2001 (S.S.I. 2001/211)
- Sweeteners in Food Amendment (Scotland) Regulations 2001 (S.S.I. 2001/212)
- A1 Trunk Road (Thistly Cross to West of Bowerhouse Junction Dualling) (Side Roads) Order S.S.I. 2001/213)
- Child Minding and Day Care (Registration and Inspection Fees) Amendment (Scotland) Regulations 2001 (S.S.I. 2001/214)
- Nursing Homes Registration (Scotland) Amendment Regulations 2001 (S.S.I. 2001/215)
- Nurses Agencies (Increase of Licence Fees) (Scotland) Regulations 2001 216)
- Justices of the Peace (Tribunal) (Scotland) Regulations 2001 (S.S.I. 2001/S.S.I. 2001/217)
- Existing Facilities in Quality Partnership Schemes (Scotland) Regulations 2001 (S.S.I. 2001/218)
- Public Service Vehicles (Registration of Local Services) (Scotland) Regulations 2001 (S.S.I. 2001/219)
- Agricultural Processing and Marketing Grants (Scotland) Regulations 2001 (S.S.I. 2001/220)
- Pesticides (Maximum Residue Levels in Crops, Food and Feeding Stuffs) (Scotland) Amendment (No. 2) Regulations 2001 (S.S.I. 2001/221)
- Education (Assisted Places) (Scotland) Regulations 2001 (S.S.I. 2001/222)
- St Mary's Music School (Aided Places) (Scotland) Regulations 2001 (S.S.I. 2001/223)
- Air Quality Limit Values (Scotland) Regulations 2001 (S.S.I. 2001/224)
- Suckler Cow Premium (Scotland) Regulations 2001 (S.S.I. 2001/225)
- Agricultural Subsidies (Appeals) (Scotland) Amendment Regulations 2001 (S.S.I. 2001/226)
- Repayment of Student Loans (Scotland) Amendment Regulations 2001 (S.S.I. 2001/227)
- Education (Student Loans) (Scotland) Regulations 2000 Amendment Regulations 2001 (S.S.I. 2001/228)
- Students' Allowances (Scotland) Amendment Regulations 2001 (S.S.I. 2001/229)
- Gaming Act (Variation of Fees) (No.2) (Scotland) Order 2001 (S.S.I. 2001/230)
- BSE Monitoring (Scotland) Regulations 2001 (S.S.I. 2001/231)
- Lerwick Harbour Revision Order 2001 (S.S.I. 2001/232)
- A76 Trunk Road (Crossroads Junction Improvement) (Side Roads) Order S.S.I. 2001/233)
- Bell College of Technology (Scotland) Order of Council 2001 (S.S.I. 2001/234)
- Adoption (Intercountry Aspects) Act 1999 (Commencement No. 6) Order 2001 (S.S.I. 2001/235)
- Adoption of Children from Overseas (Scotland) Regulations 2001 (S.S.I. 2001/236)
- Food Protection (Emergency Prohibitions) (Paralytic Shellfish Poisoning) (West Coast) (Scotland) Order 2001 (S.S.I. 2001/237)
- Water Supply (Water Quality) (Scotland) Amendment Regulations 2001 (S.S.I. 2001/238)
- A85 Trunk Road (St Fillans) (30 mph Speed Limit) Order 2001 (S.S.I. 2001/240)
- Food Protection (Emergency Prohibitions) (Paralytic Shellfish Poisoning) (Orkney) (No. 2) (Scotland) Order 2001 (S.S.I. 2001/241)
- Protection of Wrecks (Designation) (Scotland) Order 2001 (S.S.I. 2001/242)
- Import and Export Restrictions (Foot-and-Mouth Disease) (Scotland) (No. 2) Amendment Regulations 2001 (S.S.I. 2001/243)
- Town and Country Planning (General Permitted Development) (Scotland) Amendment Order 2001 (S.S.I. 2001/244)
- Town and Country Planning (General Permitted Development) (Scotland) Amendment Order 2001 (S.S.I. 2001/245)
- Foot-and-Mouth Disease (Scotland) (Declaratory and Controlled Area) Amendment (No. 7) Order 2001 (S.S.I. 2001/246)
- Foot-and-Mouth Disease (Scotland) Declaratory (No. 5) Amendment (No. 4) Order 2001 (S.S.I. 2001/247)
- Control of Pollution (Silage, Slurry and Agricultural Fuel Oil) (Scotland) Amendment Regulations 2001 (S.S.I. 2001/248)
- Plant Health (Great Britain) Amendment (Scotland) Order 2001 (S.S.I. 2001/249)
- Sea Fish (Specified Sea Areas) (Regulation of Nets and Other Fishing Gear) (Scotland) Amendment Order 2001 (S.S.I. 2001/250)
- Public Service Vehicles (Registration of Local Services) (Scotland) Amendment Regulations 2001 (S.S.I. 2001/251)
- Beef Labelling (Enforcement) (Scotland) Regulations 2001 (S.S.I. 2001/252)
- Registered Establishments (Fees) (Scotland) Order 2001 (S.S.I. 2001/253)
- A82 Trunk Road (Invermoriston) (40 mph Speed Limit) Order 2001 (S.S.I. 2001/254)
- Food Protection (Emergency Prohibitions) (Paralytic Shellfish Poisoning) (Orkney) (No. 3) (Scotland) Order 2001 (S.S.I. 2001/255)
- Food Protection (Emergency Prohibitions) (Paralytic Shellfish Poisoning) (East Coast) (Scotland) Order 2001 (S.S.I. 2001/256)
- Products of Animal Origin (Import and Export) Amendment (Scotland) Regulations 2001 (S.S.I. 2001/257)
- Foot-and-Mouth Disease (Scotland) (Declaratory Orders) General Amendment (No. 2) Order 2001 (S.S.I. 2001/258)
- Farm Business Development (Scotland) Scheme 2001 (S.S.I. 2001/259)
- Local Government Finance (Scotland) (No. 2) Order 2001 (S.S.I. 2001/260)
- Foot-and-Mouth Disease (Control of Vaccination) (Scotland) Regulations 2001 (S.S.I. 2001/261)
- Comhairle nan Eilean Siar (Aird Mhor, Barra) Harbour Empowerment Order 2001 (S.S.I. 2001/262)
- Foot-and-Mouth Disease (Scotland) (Declaratory Orders) General Revocation Order 2001 (S.S.I. 2001/264)
- Consumer Protection Act 1987 (Product Liability) (Modification) (Scotland) Order 2001 (S.S.I. 2001/265)
- Town and Country Planning (General Permitted Development) (Scotland) Amendment (No. 2) Order 2001 (S.S.I. 2001/266)
- Home Energy Efficiency Scheme Amendment (Scotland) Regulations 2001 (S.S.I. 2001/267)
- A85 Trunk Road (West Hintingtower/Lochty) (40 mph Speed Limit) Order 2001 (S.S.I. 2001/268)
- A84/A85 Trunk Road (Callander) (30 mph Speed Limit) Order 2001 (S.S.I. 2001/269)
- A9 Trunk Road (Stafford Street, Helmsdale) (Temporary Prohibition of Traffic) Order 2001 (S.S.I. 2001/270)
- Import and Export Restrictions (Foot-and-Mouth Disease) (Scotland) (No. 2) Amendment (No. 2) Regulations 2001 (S.S.I. 2001/271)
- Foot-and-Mouth Disease (Scotland) Declaratory (No. 5) Amendment (No. 5) Order 2001 (S.S.I. 2001/272)
- Food Protection (Emergency Prohibitions) (Amnesic Shellfish Poisoning) (West Coast) (Scotland) Order 2001 (S.S.I. 2001/273)
- Convention Rights (Compliance) (Scotland) Act 2001 (Commencement) Order 2001 (S.S.I. 2001/274)
- Foot-and-Mouth Disease (Scotland) Declaratory (No. 5) Amendment (No. 6) Order 2001 (S.S.I. 2001/275)
- Processed Animal Protein (Scotland) Regulations 2001 (S.S.I. 2001/276)
- A90 Trunk Road (Aberdeen to Dyce Millennium Cycle Route) (Redetermination of Means of Exercise of Public Right of Passage) Order S.S.I. 2001/277)
- Graduate Endowment (Scotland) Regulations 2001 (S.S.I. 2001/280)
- Food Protection (Emergency Prohibitions) (Amnesic Shellfish Poisoning) (West Coast) (No. 2) (Scotland) Order 2001 (S.S.I. 2001/281)
- Food Protection (Emergency Prohibitions) (Amnesic, Paralytic and Diarrhetic Shellfish Poisoning) (Orkney) (Scotland) Order 2001 (S.S.I. 2001/282)
- Food Protection (Emergency Prohibitions) (Amnesic Shellfish Poisoning) (West Coast) (No. 3) (Scotland) Order 2001 (S.S.I. 2001/284)
- A1 Trunk Road (East of Haddington to Dunbar) Special Road (Variation) Scheme S.S.I. 2001/285)
- A1 Trunk Road (East of Haddington to Dunbar) Special Road (Side Roads) (Variation) Order S.S.I. 2001/286)
- Specified Risk Material Amendment (Scotland) Order 2001 (S.S.I. 2001/287)
- Specified Risk Material Amendment (No. 3) (Scotland) Regulations 2001 (S.S.I. 2001/288)
- Food Protection (Emergency Prohibitions) (Amnesic Shellfish Poisoning) (West Coast) (No. 4) (Scotland) Order 2001 (S.S.I. 2001/289)
- Foot-and-Mouth Disease Declaratory (Controlled Area) (Scotland) (No. 3) Amendment (No. 5) Order 2001 (S.S.I. 2001/290)
- Teachers' Superannuation (Scotland) Amendment Regulations 2001 (S.S.I. 2001/291)
- Teachers' Superannuation (Additional Voluntary Contributions) (Scotland) Amendment Regulations 2001 (S.S.I. 2001/292)
- Food Protection (Emergency Prohibitions) (Paralytic Shellfish Poisoning) (Orkney) (Scotland) Revocation Order 2001 (S.S.I. 2001/294)
- Food Protection (Emergency Prohibitions) (Amnesic Shellfish Poisoning) (West Coast) (No. 5) (Scotland) Order 2001 (S.S.I. 2001/295)
- A9 Trunk Road (Ballinling) (Temporary 50 mph Speed Limit) Order 2001 (S.S.I. 2001/296)
- Foot-and-Mouth Disease (Ascertainment of Value) (Scotland) (No. 4) Order 2001 (S.S.I. 2001/297)
- Right to Time Off for Study or Training (Scotland) Amendment (No. 2) Regulations 2001 (S.S.I. 2001/298)
- Rural Stewardship Scheme (Scotland) Regulations 2001 (S.S.I. 2001/300)

== 301-400 ==
- National Health Service Trusts (Membership and Procedure) (Scotland) Regulations 2001 (S.S.I. 2001/301)
- Health Boards (Membership and Procedure) (Scotland) Regulations 2001 (S.S.I. 2001/302)
- Scottish Social Services Council (Appointments, Procedure and Access to the Register) Regulations 2001 (S.S.I. 2001/303)
- Regulation of Care (Scotland) Act 2001 (Commencement No. 1) Order 2001 (S.S.I. 2001/304)
- Act of Sederunt (Rules of the Court of Session Amendment No.4) (Miscellaneous) 2001 (S.S.I. 2001/305)
- Criminal Legal Aid (Scotland) Amendment Regulations 2001 (S.S.I. 2001/306)
- Criminal Legal Aid (Fixed Payments) (Scotland) Amendment Regulations 2001 (S.S.I. 2001/307)
- Land Registration (Scotland) Act 1979 (Commencement No. 15) Order 2001 (S.S.I. 2001/309)
- Firemen's Pension Scheme (Pension Sharing on Divorce) (Scotland) Order 2001 (S.S.I. 2001/310)
- Education (Student Loans) (Scotland) Regulations 2000 Amendment (No. 2) Regulations 2001 (S.S.I. 2001/311)
- Foot-and-Mouth Disease (Scotland) Declaratory (No. 5) Revocation Order 2001 (S.S.I. 2001/312)
- Food Protection (Emergency Prohibitions) (Radioactivity in Sheep) Partial Revocation (Scotland) Order 2001 (S.S.I. 2001/313)
- Food Protection (Emergency Prohibitions) (Paralytic Shellfish Poisoning) (West Coast) (Scotland) Revocation Order 2001 (S.S.I. 2001/314)
- Parole Board (Scotland) Rules 2001 (S.S.I. 2001/315)
- Food Protection (Emergency Prohibitions) (Amnesic Shellfish Poisoning) (West Coast) (No. 6) (Scotland) Order 2001 (S.S.I. 2001/316)
- Food Protection (Emergency Prohibitions) (Amnesic Shellfish Poisoning) (East Coast) (Scotland) Order 2001 (S.S.I. 2001/317)
- Highlands and Islands Agricultural Programme and Rural Diversification Programme (Scotland) Amendment Regulations 2001 (S.S.I. 2001/319)
- Building Standards (Scotland) Amendment Regulations 2001 (S.S.I. 2001/320)
- Farm and Conservation Grant Amendment (Scotland) Regulations 2001 (S.S.I. 2001/321)
- Food Protection (Emergency Prohibitions) (Amnesic Shellfish Poisoning) (West Coast) (No. 7) (Scotland) Order 2001 (S.S.I. 2001/322)
- Housing (Scotland) Act 2001 (Registered Social Landlords) Order 2001 (S.S.I. 2001/326)
- Education and Training (Scotland) Amendment Regulations 2001 (S.S.I. 2001/329)
- Fishing Vessels (Decommissioning) (Scotland) Scheme 2001 (S.S.I. 2001/332)
- Potatoes Originating in Germany (Notification) (Scotland) Order 2001 (S.S.I. 2001/333)
- Feeding Stuffs and the Feeding Stuffs (Enforcement) Amendment (Scotland) Regulations 2001 (S.S.I. 2001/334)
- Fossil Fuel Levy (Scotland) Amendment Regulations 2001 (S.S.I. 2001/335)
- Housing (Scotland) Act 2001 (Commencement No. 1, Transitional Provisions and Savings) Order 2001 (S.S.I. 2001/336)
- Wildlife and Countryside Act 1981 (Amendment) (Scotland) Regulations 2001 (S.S.I. 2001/337)
- Argyll and Clyde Acute Hospitals National Health Service Trust (Establishment) Amendment Order 2001 (S.S.I. 2001/338)
- Ayrshire and Arran Primary Care National Health Service Trust (Establishment) Amendment Order 2001 (S.S.I. 2001/339)
- Ayrshire and Arran Acute Hospitals National Health Service Trust (Establishment) Amendment Order 2001 (S.S.I. 2001/340)
- Borders General Hospital National Health Service Trust (Establishment) Amendment Order 2001 (S.S.I. 2001/341)
- Fife Acute Hospitals National Health Service Trust (Establishment) Amendment Order 2001 (S.S.I. 2001/342)
- Dumfries and Galloway Primary Care National Health Service Trust (Establishment) Amendment Order 2001 (S.S.I. 2001/343)
- Borders Primary Care National Health Service Trust (Establishment) Amendment Order 2001 (S.S.I. 2001/344)
- Dumfries and Galloway Acute and Maternity Hospitals National Health Service Trust (Establishment) Amendment Order 2001 (S.S.I. 2001/345)
- Grampian Primary Care National Health Service Trust (Establishment) Amendment Order 2001 (S.S.I. 2001/346)
- Forth Valley Primary Care National Health Service Trust (Establishment) Amendment Order 2001 (S.S.I. 2001/347)
- Forth Valley Acute Hospitals National Health Service Trust (Establishment) Amendment Order 2001 (S.S.I. 2001/348)
- Fife Primary Care National Health Service Trust (Establishment) Amendment Order 2001 (S.S.I. 2001/349)
- Grampian University Hospitals National Health Service Trust (Establishment) Amendment Order 2001 (S.S.I. 2001/350)
- Greater Glasgow Primary Care National Health Service Trust (Establishment) Amendment Order 2001 (S.S.I. 2001/351)
- Highland Acute Hospitals National Health Service Trust (Establishment) Amendment Order 2001 (S.S.I. 2001/352)
- Highland Primary Care National Health Service Trust (Establishment) Amendment Order 2001 (S.S.I. 2001/353)
- Lomond and Argyll Primary Care National Health Service Trust (Establishment) Amendment Order 2001 (S.S.I. 2001/354)
- Lothian Primary Care National Health Service Trust (Establishment) Amendment Order 2001 (S.S.I. 2001/355)
- Lanarkshire Primary Care National Health Service Trust (Establishment) Amendment Order 2001 (S.S.I. 2001/356)
- Lanarkshire Acute Hospitals National Health Service Trust (Establishment) Amendment Order 2001 (S.S.I. 2001/357)
- Foot-and-Mouth Disease (Marking of Meat, Meat Products, Minced Meat and Meat Preparations) (Scotland) Regulations 2001 (S.S.I. 2001/358)
- Lothian University Hospitals National Health Service Trust (Establishment) Amendment Order 2001 (S.S.I. 2001/359)
- North Glasgow University Hospitals National Health Service Trust (Establishment) Amendment Order 2001 (S.S.I. 2001/360)
- Renfrewshire and Inverclyde Primary Care National Health Service Trust (Establishment) Amendment Order 2001 (S.S.I. 2001/361)
- South Glasgow University Hospitals National Health Service Trust (Establishment) Amendment Order 2001 (S.S.I. 2001/362)
- Tayside Primary Care National Health Service Trust (Establishment) Amendment Order 2001 (S.S.I. 2001/363)
- Tayside University Hospitals National Health Service Trust (Establishment) Amendment Order 2001 (S.S.I. 2001/364)
- West Lothian Healthcare National Health Service Trust (Establishment) Amendment Order 2001 (S.S.I. 2001/365)
- Yorkhill National Health Service Trust (Establishment) Amendment Order 2001 (S.S.I. 2001/366)
- Import and Export Restrictions (Foot-and-Mouth Disease) (Scotland) (No. 2) Amendment (No. 3) Regulations 2001 (S.S.I. 2001/367)
- National Health Service (General Dental Services) (Scotland) Amendment (No. 2) Regulations 2001 (S.S.I. 2001/368)
- North of Scotland Water Authority (River Lochy Abstraction Scheme) Water Order 2001 (S.S.I. 2001/369)
- A7 Trunk Road (Sandbed and Albert Bridge, Hawick) (Temporary One Way Traffic) Order 2001 (S.S.I. 2001/371)
- Food Protection (Emergency Prohibitions) (Amnesic Shellfish Poisoning) (West Coast) (No. 8) (Scotland) Order 2001 (S.S.I. 2001/374)
- A828 Trunk Road (Appin/Tynnbbie) (40 mph Speed Limit) Order 2001 (S.S.I. 2001/379)
- A828 (Portnaroish) (40 mph Speed Limit) Order 2001 (S.S.I. 2001/380)
- Criminal Legal Aid (Scotland) (Prescribed Proceedings) Amendment Regulations 2001 (S.S.I. 2001/381)
- Advice and Assistance (Assistance by Way of Representation) (Scotland) Amendment (No. 3) Regulations 2001 (S.S.I. 2001/382)
- Processed Animal Protein (Scotland) Amendment Regulations 2001 (S.S.I. 2001/383)
- Protection of Wrecks (Designation) (No. 2) (Scotland) Order 2001 (S.S.I. 2001/384)
- Food Protection (Emergency Prohibitions) (Paralytic Shellfish Poisoning) (East Coast) (No. 2) (Scotland) Order 2001 (S.S.I. 2001/387)
- Food Protection (Emergency Prohibitions) (Amnesic Shellfish Poisoning) (West Coast) (No. 9) (Scotland) Order 2001 (S.S.I. 2001/388)
- Glasgow Science Centre Pedestrian Bridge Scheme 2001 Confirmation Instrument S.S.I. 2001/389)
- Abolition of the Intervention Board for Agricultural Produce (Consequential Provisions) (Scotland) Regulations 2001 (S.S.I. 2001/390)
- Food Protection (Emergency Prohibitions) (Diarrhetic Shellfish Poisoning) (Orkney) (Scotland) Order 2001 (S.S.I. 2001/391)
- Legal Aid (Employment of Solicitors) (Scotland) Regulations 2001 (S.S.I. 2001/392)
- Legal Aid (Scotland) Act 1986 (Commencement No. 4) Order 2001 (S.S.I. 2001/393)
- Import and Export Restrictions (Foot-and-Mouth Disease) (Scotland) (No. 2) Amendment (No. 4) Regulations 2001 (S.S.I. 2001/394)
- Food Protection (Emergency Prohibitions) (Amnesic Shellfish Poisoning) (West Coast) (Scotland) Partial Revocation Order 2001 (S.S.I. 2001/395)
- Housing (Scotland) Act 2001 (Transfer of Scottish Homes Property etc.) Order 2001 (S.S.I. 2001/396)
- Housing (Scotland) Act 2001 (Commencement No. 2, Transitional Provisions, Savings and Variation) Order 2001 (S.S.I. 2001/397)
- A82 Trunk Road (Invermoriston) (40 mph Speed Limit) Order 2001 (S.S.I. 2001/398)
- Standards in Scotland's Schools etc. Act 2000 (Commencement No. 3 and Transitional Provisions) Amendment Order 2001 (S.S.I. 2001/400)

== 401-494 ==
- The Import and Export Restrictions (Foot-and-Mouth Disease) (Scotland) (Recovery of Costs) Regulations 2001 (S.S.I. 2001/401)
- The Holyrood Park Amendment Regulations 2001 (S.S.I. 2001/405)
- The Food Protection (Emergency Prohibitions) (Amnesic Shellfish Poisoning) (West Coast) (No. 10) (Scotland) Order 2001 (S.S.I. 2001/406)
- The Northern College of Education (Closure) (Scotland) Order 2001 (S.S.I. 2001/407)
- The Diligence against Earnings (Variation) (Scotland) Regulations 2001 (S.S.I. 2001/408)
- The Fish Health Amendment (Scotland) Regulations 2001 (S.S.I. 2001/409)
- The Pensions Appeal Tribunals (Scotland) (Amendment) Rules 2001 (S.S.I. 2001/410)
- The Food Protection (Emergency Prohibitions) (Paralytic Shellfish Poisoning) (Orkney) (No. 2) (Scotland) Revocation Order 2001 (S.S.I. 2001/411)
- The Food Protection (Emergency Prohibitions) (Amnesic Shellfish Poisoning) (East Coast) (Scotland) Revocation Order 2001 (S.S.I. 2001/412)
- The Food Protection (Emergency Prohibitions) (Amnesic Shellfish Poisoning) (West Coast) (Scotland) Partial Revocation (No. 2) Order 2001 (S.S.I. 2001/413)
- The Food Protection (Emergency Prohibitions) (Amnesic Shellfish Poisoning) (West Coast) (No. 3) (Scotland) Partial Revocation Order 2001 (S.S.I. 2001/414)
- The Import and Export Restrictions (Foot-and-Mouth Disease) (Scotland) (No. 2) Amendment (No. 5) Regulations 2001 (S.S.I. 2001/415)
- The Mortgage Rights (Scotland) Act 2001 (Commencement and Transitional Provision) Order 2001 (S.S.I. 2001/418 (C. 18))
- The Mortgage Rights (Scotland) Act 2001 (Prescribed Notice) Order 2001 (S.S.I. 2001/419)
- The Food Protection (Emergency Prohibitions) (Amnesic Shellfish Poisoning) (West Coast) (No. 11) (Scotland) Order 2001 (S.S.I. 2001/420)
- The Potatoes Originating in Egypt (Scotland) Regulations 2001 (S.S.I. 2001/421)
- The Colours in Food Amendment (Scotland) Regulations 2001 (S.S.I. 2001/422)
- The Food Protection (Emergency Prohibitions) (Amnesic Shellfish Poisoning) (West Coast) (No. 12) (Scotland) Order 2001 (S.S.I. 2001/423)
- The Scottish Social Services Council (Consultation on Codes of Practice) Order 2001 (S.S.I. 2001/424)
- The Food Protection (Emergency Prohibitions) (Amnesic Shellfish Poisoning) (West Coast) (No. 13) (Scotland) Order 2001 (S.S.I. 2001/425)
- The Import and Export Restrictions (Foot-and-Mouth Disease) (Scotland) (No. 3) Regulations 2001 (S.S.I. 2001/429)
- The National Health Service (Charges for Drugs and Appliances) (Scotland) Regulations 2001 (S.S.I. 2001/430)
- The Local Government (Exemption from Competition) (Scotland) Amendment Order 2001 (S.S.I. 2001/431)
- The Local Government Act 1988 (Competition) (Scotland) Amendment Regulations 2001 (S.S.I. 2001/432)
- The Smoke Control Areas (Authorised Fuels) (Scotland) Regulations 2001 (S.S.I. 2001/433)
- The Food Protection (Emergency Prohibitions) (Amnesic Shellfish Poisoning) (West Coast) (No. 2) (Scotland) Partial Revocation Order 2001 (S.S.I. 2001/434)
- The Pesticides (Maximum Residue Levels in Crops, Food and Feeding Stuffs) (Scotland) Amendment (No. 3) Regulations 2001 (S.S.I. 2001/435)
- The National Health Service (Superannuation Scheme, Injury Benefits and Compensation for Premature Retirement) (Scotland) Amendment Regulations 2001 (S.S.I. 2001/437)
- Act of Sederunt (Fees of Solicitors in the Sheriff Court) (Amendment) 2001 (S.S.I. 2001/438)
- Act of Sederunt (Fees of Sheriff Officers) 2001 (S.S.I. 2001/439)
- Act of Sederunt (Fees of Messengers-At-Arms) 2001 (S.S.I. 2001/440)
- Act of Sederunt (Rules of the Court of Session Amendment No. 5) (Fees of Solicitors) 2001 (S.S.I. 2001/441)
- The Food Protection (Emergency Prohibitions) (Amnesic Shellfish Poisoning) (West Coast) (Scotland) Order 2001 Revocation Order 2001 (S.S.I. 2001/442)
- The Food Protection (Emergency Prohibitions) (Paralytic Shellfish Poisoning) (East Coast) (No. 2) (Scotland) Revocation Order 2001 (S.S.I. 2001/443)
- The Food Protection (Emergency Prohibitions) (Amnesic Shellfish Poisoning) (West Coast) (No. 3) (Scotland) Revocation Order 2001 (S.S.I. 2001/444)
- The Beef Special Premium (Scotland) Regulations 2001 (S.S.I. 2001/445)
- The Local Government Act 1988 (Competition) (Scotland) Amendment (No. 2) Regulations 2001 (S.S.I. 2001/446)
- The Community Care (Direct Payments) (Scotland) Amendment Regulations 2001 (S.S.I. 2001/447)
- The Sea Fishing (Enforcement of Community Satellite Monitoring Measures) (Scotland) Order 2000 Amendment Regulations 2001 (S.S.I. 2001/448)
- The Inshore Fishing (Prohibition of Fishing for Cockles) (Scotland) Amendment Order 2001 (S.S.I. 2001/449)
- The Miscellaneous Food Additives (Amendment) (No. 2) (Scotland) Regulations 2001 (S.S.I. 2001/450)
- The Food Protection (Emergency Prohibitions) (Amnesic Shellfish Poisoning) (West Coast) (No. 14) (Scotland) Order 2001 (S.S.I. 2001/451)
- The Plant Protection Products Amendment (No. 3) (Scotland) Regulations 2001 (S.S.I. 2001/454)
- The Import and Export Restrictions (Foot-and-Mouth Disease) (Scotland) (No. 3) Amendment Regulations 2001 (S.S.I. 2001/455)
- The International Criminal Court (Scotland) Act 2001 (Commencement) Order 2001 (S.S.I. 2001/456 (C. 20))
- The Fraserburgh Harbour Revision (Constitution) Order 2001 (S.S.I. 2001/457)
- The Sheep and Goats Spongiform Encephalopathy (Compensation) Amendment (Scotland) Order 2001 (S.S.I. 2001/458)
- The Police Pensions (Pension Sharing on Divorce) (Scotland) Amendment Regulations 2001 (S.S.I. 2001/459)
- The Local Government Pension Scheme (Scotland) Amendment Regulations 2001 (S.S.I. 2001/460)
- The Police Pensions (Additional Voluntary Contributions and Increased Benefits) (Pension Sharing) (Scotland) Amendment Regulations 2001 (S.S.I. 2001/461)
- The Food Protection (Emergency Prohibitions) (Paralytic Shellfish Poisoning) (East Coast) (Scotland) Revocation Order 2001 (S.S.I. 2001/462)
- The Food Protection (Emergency Prohibitions) (Amnesic, Paralytic and Diarrhetic Shellfish Poisoning) (Orkney) (Scotland) Partial Revocation Order 2001 (S.S.I. 2001/463)
- The Legal Aid (Scotland) Act 1986 (Availability of Solicitors) Regulations 2001 (S.S.I. 2001/464)
- The National Health Service (Scotland) (Superannuation Scheme and Additional Voluntary Contributions) (Pension Sharing on Divorce) Amendment Regulations 2001 (S.S.I. 2001/465)
- The Road Traffic (NHS Charges) Amendment (Scotland) Regulations 2001 (S.S.I. 2001/466)
- The Housing (Scotland) Act 2001 (Commencement No. 3, Transitional Provisions and Savings) Order 2001 (S.S.I. 2001/467 (C. 21))
- The Food Protection (Emergency Prohibitions) (Amnesic Shellfish Poisoning) (West Coast) (No. 13) (Scotland) Revocation Order 2001 (S.S.I. 2001/468)
- The Food Protection (Emergency Prohibitions) (Amnesic Shellfish Poisoning) (West Coast) (No. 9) (Scotland) Partial Revocation Order 2001 (S.S.I. 2001/469)
- The Food Protection (Emergency Prohibitions) (Amnesic Shellfish Poisoning) (West Coast) (No. 11) (Scotland) Revocation Order 2001 (S.S.I. 2001/470)
- The Food Protection (Emergency Prohibitions) (Amnesic Shellfish Poisoning) (West Coast) (No. 10) (Scotland) Revocation Order 2001 (S.S.I. 2001/471)
- The Food Protection (Emergency Prohibitions) (Amnesic Shellfish Poisoning) (West Coast) (No. 6) (Scotland) Order 2001 Revocation Order 2001 (S.S.I. 2001/472)
- The Food Protection (Emergency Prohibitions) (Amnesic Shellfish Poisoning) (West Coast) (No. 4) (Scotland) Partial Revocation Order 2001 (S.S.I. 2001/473)
- The Ethical Standards in Public Life etc. (Scotland) Act 2000 (Commencement No. 2 and Transitional Provisions) Order 2001 (S.S.I. 2001/474 (C. 22))
- The Children (Scotland) Act 1995 (Commencement No.4) Order 2001 (S.S.I. 2001/475 (C. 23))
- The Panels of Persons to Safeguard the Interests of Children (Scotland) Regulations 2001 (S.S.I. 2001/476)
- The Curators ad Litem and Reporting Officers (Panels) (Scotland) Regulations 2001 (S.S.I. 2001/477)
- The Children's Hearings (Legal Representation) (Scotland) Rules 2001 (S.S.I. 2001/478)
- Act of Adjournal (Criminal Procedural Rules Amendment) (Convention Rights (Compliance) (Scotland) Act 2001) 2001 (S.S.I. 2001/479)
- The Budget (Scotland) Act 2001 (Amendment) Order 2001 (S.S.I. 2001/480)
- The Foot-and-Mouth Disease Declaratory (Controlled Area) (Scotland) (No. 3) Amendment (No. 6) Order 2001 (S.S.I. 2001/481)
- The Police Act 1997 (Commencement No. 8) (Scotland) Order 2001 (S.S.I. 2001/482 (C. 24))
- The Import and Export Restrictions (Foot-and-Mouth Disease) (Scotland) (No. 3) Amendment (No. 2) Regulations 2001 (S.S.I. 2001/483)
- The Rural Diversification Programme (Scotland) Amendment Regulations 2001 (S.S.I. 2001/484)
- Act of Adjournal (Criminal Procedural Rules Amendment No.2) (Terrorism Act 2000 and Anti-Terrorism, Crime and Security Act 2001) 2001 (S.S.I. 2001/486)
- Act of Sederunt (Rules of the Court of Session Amendment No. 6) (Terrorism Act 2000) 2001 (S.S.I. 2001/494)
