= Newspapers, Printers, and Reading Rooms Repeal Act 1869 =

Act of the Parliament of the United Kingdom

Newspapers, Printers, and Reading Rooms Repeal Act 1869 (Note: Section 2.)
- Act of Parliament
- Parliament of the United Kingdom
- Long title: An Act to repeal certain enactments relating to Newspapers, Pamphlets, and other Publications, and to Printers, Typefounders, and Reading Rooms.
- Citation: 32 & 33 Vict. c. 24
- Territorial extent: United Kingdom

Dates
- Royal assent: 12 July 1869
- Commencement: 12 July 1869 (Note: The Acts of Parliament (Commencement) Act 1793.)

Other legislation
- Amends: See § Repealed enactments
- Repeals/revokes: See § Repealed enactments
- Amended by: Statute Law Revision Act 1883; Statute Law Revision (No. 2) Act 1893; Printer’s Imprint Act 1961; Statute Law (Repeals) Act 1973; Criminal Procedure (Scotland) Act 1975; Criminal Justice Act 1982; Law Officers Act 1997; Courts Act 2003
- Relates to: Newspaper Libel and Registration Act 1881

Status: Amended

Text of statute as originally enacted

Revised text of statute as amended

Text of the Newspapers, Printers, and Reading Rooms Repeal Act 1869 as in force today (including any amendments) within the United Kingdom, from legislation.gov.uk.

The Newspapers, Printers, and Reading Rooms Repeal Act 1869 (32 & 33 Vict. c. 24) is an act of the Parliament of the United Kingdom that repealed various enactments relating to newspapers, printers and reading rooms in the United Kingdom.

The act abolished the compulsory registration of proprietors, but this was reintroduced by the Newspaper Libel and Registration Act 1881 (44 & 45 Vict. c. 60).

== Provisions ==
=== Repealed enactments ===
Section 1 of the act repealed 11 enactments, listed in the first schedule to the act. The act reinstated certain provisions, listed in the second schedule to the act.

Citation	Short title	Description	Extent of repeal
36 Geo. 3. c. 8	Seditious Meetings Act 1795	An Act for the more effectually preventing seditious meetings and assemblies.	The whole act.
39 Geo. 3. c. 79	Unlawful Societies Act 1799	An Act for the more effectual" suppression of societies established for seditious and treasonable purposes, and for better preventing treasonable and seditious practices.	Sections fifteen to thirty-three, both inclusive, and so much of " sections thirty-four to thirty-nine as relates to the above-mentioned sections.
51 Geo. 3. c. 65	Printers and Publishers Act 1811	An Act to explain and amend an Act passed in the thirty-ninth year of His Majesty's reign, intituled "An Act for the " more effectual suppression of societies established for seditious and treasonable purposes, and for better preventing " treasonable and seditious practices," so far as respects certain penalties on printers and publishers.	The whole act.
55 Geo. 3. c. 101	Stamps Act 1815	An Act to regulate the collection of stamp duties and matters in respect of which licences may be granted by the commissioner of stamps in Ireland.	Section thirteen.
60 Geo. 3. & 1 Geo. 4. c. 9	Newspapers, etc. Act 1819	An Act to subject certain publications to the duties of stamps upon newspapers, and to make other regulations for restraining the abuses arising from the publication of blasphemous and seditious libels.	The whole act.
11 Geo. 4. & 1 Will. 4. c. 73	Libels Act 1830	An Act to repeal so much of an Act of the sixtieth year of His late Majesty King George the Third, for the more effectual prevention and punishment of blasphemous and seditious libels, as relates to the sentence of banishment for the second offence, and to provide some further remedy against the abuse of publishing libels.	The whole act.
6 & 7 Will. 4. c. 76	Stamp Duties on Newspapers Act 1836	An Act to reduce the duties on newspapers, and to amend the laws relating to the duties on newspapers and advertisements.	Except sections one to four (both inclusive), sections thirty-four and thirty-five, and the schedule.
2 & 3 Vict. c. 12	Printers and Publishers Act 1839	An Act to amend an Act of the thirty-ninth year of King George the Third, for the more effectual suppression of societies established for seditious and treasonable purposes, and for preventing treasonable and seditious practices, and to put an end to certain proceedings now pending under the said Act.	The whole act.
5 & 6 Vict. c. 82	Stamp Duties (Ireland) Act 1842	An Act to assimilate the stamp duties in Great Britain and Ireland, and to make regulations for collecting and managing the same until the tenth day of October one thousand eight hundred and forty-five.	The following words in section twenty " and " also licence to any " person to keep any " printing presses and, " types for printing in " Ireland."
9 & 10 Vict. c. 33	Seditious Meeting Act 1846	An Act to amend the laws relating to corresponding societies and the licensing of lecture rooms.	So far as it relates to any proceedings under the enactments repealed by this schedule.
16 & 17 Vict. c. 59	Stamp Act 1853	An Act to repeal certain stamp duties and to grant others in lieu thereof, to amend the laws relating to stamp duties, and to make perpetual certain stamp duties in Ireland.	So much of section twenty as makes perpetual the provisions of 5 & 6 Vict. c. 82. repealed by this Act.
