= Slander of Women Act 1891 =

Act of the Parliament of the United Kingdom

Slander of Women Act 1891 (Note: Section 2.)
- Act of Parliament
- Parliament of the United Kingdom
- Long title: An Act to amend the Law relating to the Slander of Women
- Citation: 54 & 55 Vict. c. 51
- Territorial extent: England and Wales; Ireland

Dates
- Royal assent: 5 August 1891
- Commencement: 5 August 1891 (Note: The Acts of Parliament (Commencement) Act 1793.)
- Repealed: Republic of Ireland: 1 January 1962; England and Wales: 1 January 2014 (Note: The Defamation Act 2013 (Commencement) (England and Wales) Order 2013 (SI 2013/3027))
Other legislation
Repealed by	Republic of Ireland: Defamation Act 1961; England and Wales:Defamation Act 2013; Northern Ireland: Defamation Act (Northern Ireland) 2022

Status: Repealed

Text of statute as originally enacted

The Slander of Women Act 1891 (54 & 55 Vict. c. 51) was an act of the Parliament of the United Kingdom.

== Section 1 ==
=== Slander imputing unchastity or adultery to a female ===
Section 1 of the act provided that in an action for slander ("words spoken and published"), brought by a female plaintiff in respect of words that impute unchastity or adultery to her, it is not necessary for her to allege or prove that she has suffered special damage.

The word "unchastity" is not confined to unchastity with a man. To call a woman a "lesbian" is to impute "unchastity" to her.

However, the section then provides that in an action for slander made actionable by that section, a plaintiff may not be awarded more costs than damages unless the judge certifies that "there was reasonable ground for bringing the action".

=== Republic of Ireland ===
Section 1 of the act was replaced for the Republic of Ireland by section 16 of the Defamation Act 1961. The proviso was not reproduced.

== Section 2 ==
This section provides that the act may be cited as the Slander of Women Act 1891 and that it does not apply to Scotland.

== Repeal ==
The act was repealed for the Republic of Ireland on 1 January 1962.

The whole act was repealed for England and Wales by section 14(1) of the Defamation Act 2013, which came into force on 1 January 2014.
