= University of Pennsylvania Journal of International Law =

- Discipline: International law
- Language: English

Publication details
- History: 1978-present
- Publisher: University of Pennsylvania Law School (United States)
- Frequency: Quarterly

Standard abbreviations
- Bluebook: U. Pa. J. Int'l L.
- ISO 4: Univ. Pa. J. Int. Law

Indexing
- ISSN: 1086-7872
- OCLC no.: 186377441

Links
- Journal homepage

The University of Pennsylvania Journal of International Law is a scholarly journal focusing on issues of international law, international relations, transnational law and comparative law. The Journal is published quarterly by an organization of second and third year law students at the University of Pennsylvania Law School. The journal is one of seven major scholarly journals at the University of Pennsylvania Law School and one of the top ten international law journals in the United States both based on citations and by impact.

== History ==
The journal was established in 1978 as the Journal of Comparative Business and Capital Market Law. The name of the journal was changed to University of Pennsylvania Journal of International Business Law in 1986 and then to University of Pennsylvania Journal of International Economic Law in 1996. In 2007, the journal broadened its scope and merged with the then unofficial Journal of International Law and Policy, becoming the University of Pennsylvania Journal of International Law. It now publishes articles on public and private international, comparative, foreign, and transnational law.

== Selection ==
Positions on the journal are filled based in part on students' grades during first year of law school and in part on students' performance during a writing competition conducted at the end of each school year. The writing competition has two major parts: an editing portion and a writing portion. During the 20-hour editing portion, contestants are required to correct a sample portion of a fake law review article prepared by the current board. Contestants have at their disposal a copy of the Bluebook and a packet of source materials provided by the journal. During the writing portion, contestants are required to create a cohesive, thesis-driven essay using only these source materials. The sources cover a variety of topics, and the essay does not need to be law-related.

== Symposia ==
Each year the University of Pennsylvania Journal of International Law hosts a symposium focusing on popular topics in international legal scholarship chosen by the Symposium Editors and features scholars of the law and related fields. Symposium speakers are invited to publish their work in the journal's annual symposium issue. Some recent topics include "Afro-Descendants and Indigenous Peoples in Latin America and the Caribbean: Legal Rights and Realities" (February 5, 2010) and "The Human Market: International Commoditization and Allocation of the Human Body" (February 13, 2009).

== Notable articles ==
In 2007, the journal was twice cited by the U.S. Supreme Court in Microsoft v. AT&T, 550 U.S.437 (2007). In the Opinion of the Court, Justice Ruth Bader Ginsburg quotes twice from Alan M. Fisch and Brent H. Allen's article, The Application of Domestic Patent Law to Exported Software: 35 U.S.C. § 271(f) (Univ. Penn. J. Int. Econ. Law 557, vol. 25, 2004), which was the only law review article was cited in the opinion.
