= Defamation Act 1952 =

Act of the Parliament of the United Kingdom

Defamation Act 1952 (Note: Section 18(1).)
- Act of Parliament
- Parliament of the United Kingdom
- Long title: An Act to amend the law relating to libel and slander and other malicious falsehoods.
- Citation: 15 & 16 Geo. 6 & 1 Eliz. 2. c. 66
- Territorial extent: England and Wales; Scotland; Northern Ireland (except section 15, repealed); (Note: Section 81(3).)

Dates
- Royal assent: 30 October 1952
- Commencement: 30 November 1952

Other legislation
- Amends: Parliamentary Papers Act 1840; Law of Libel Amendment Act 1888
- Amended by: Theatres Act 1968; Northern Ireland Constitution Act 1973; Statute Law (Repeals) Act 1974; Broadcasting Act 1990; Defamation Act 1996; Scotland Act 1998; Government of Wales Act 2006; Defamation Act 2013; Defamation and Malicious Publication (Scotland) Act 2021

Status: Amended

Text of statute as originally enacted

Revised text of statute as amended

Text of the Defamation Act 1952 as in force today (including any amendments) within the United Kingdom, from legislation.gov.uk.

The Defamation Act 1952 (15 & 16 Geo. 6 & 1 Eliz. 2. c. 66) is an act of the Parliament of the United Kingdom.

This act implemented recommendations contained in the Report of the Porter Committee. The recommendation made by the Committee in relation to the rule in Smith v Streatfield was not implemented.

== Provisions ==
=== Section 3 - Slander of title, etc ===
See Malicious falsehood#England and Wales and Verbal injury.

=== Section 5 - Justification ===
See English defamation law#Justification

This section was repealed by the Defamation Act 2013.

=== Section 15 - Legislative powers of Parliament of Northern Ireland ===
This section was repealed by Part I of Schedule 6 to the Northern Ireland Constitution Act 1973.

This section extended to Northern Ireland in addition to the other places to which this Act extended.

This section provided that no limitation on the powers of the Parliament of Northern Ireland imposed by the Government of Ireland Act 1920 precluded that Parliament from making laws for purposes similar to the purposes of this Act.

The Defamation Act (Northern Ireland) 1955 was made for purposes similar to the purposes of this Act.

=== Section 18 ===
Section 18(1) provides that the act came into force at the end of the period of one month that began on the date on which it was passed. The word "months" means calendar months. The day (that is to say, 30 October 1952) on which the act was passed (that is to say, received royal assent) is included in the period of one month. This means that the act came into force on 30 November 1952.

Section 18(3) repealed sections 4 and 6 of the Law of Libel Amendment Act 1888 (51 & 52 Vict. c. 64).

== Subsequent developments ==
The words "(except section fifteen)" in section 18(2) of the act were repealed by part I of schedule 6 to the Northern Ireland Constitution Act 1973. This was consequential on the repeal of section 15 by that part.

Section 18(3) of the act was repealed by section 1 of, and part XI of the schedule to, the Statute Law (Repeals) Act 1974, which came into force on 27 June 1974.

== See also ==
- Defamation Act
- English defamation law
