= Law of Libel Amendment Act 1888 =

Act of the Parliament of the United Kingdom

Law of Libel Amendment Act 1888 (Note: Section 11.)
- Act of Parliament
- Parliament of the United Kingdom
- Long title: An Act to amend the Law of Libel.
- Citation: 51 & 52 Vict. c.64
- Territorial extent: England and Wales; Ireland; (Note: Section 10.)

Dates
- Royal assent: 24 December 1888
- Commencement: 24 December 1888 (Note: The Acts of Parliament (Commencement) Act 1793.)
Other legislation
Amends	Newspaper Libel and Registration Act 1881
Amended by	Statute Law Revision Act 1908; Indictments Act 1915; Indictments Act (Northern Ireland) 1945; Defamation Act 1952; Defamation Act (Northern Ireland) 1955; Statute Law (Repeals) Act 1986; Defamation Act 1996; Criminal Justice and Immigration Act 2008Coroners and Justice Act 2009

Status: Amended

History of passage through Parliament

Text of statute as originally enacted

Text of the Law of Libel Amendment Act 1888 as in force today (including any amendments) within the United Kingdom, from legislation.gov.uk.

The Law of Libel Amendment Act 1888 (51 & 52 Vict. c. 64) is an act of the Parliament of the United Kingdom, clarifying and "amplifying" the defence of qualified privilege (and potentially a degree of absolute privilege, though this was not made clear in the statute itself) in cases involving the verbatim reproduction of court proceedings, the minutes of select committees, police notices or various other specifically recognised kinds of meetings, which had, in vaguer terms, been laid out in the Newspaper Libel and Registration Act 1881.

The act itself was lobbied for by the Provincial Newspapers Group; it was taken up by eight Members of Parliament with direct connections to the press, among them Sir Algernon Borthwick, Sir Albert Rollit, Harry Lawson, Louis Jennings, Charles Cameron, and John Morley. It was first presented on 10 February 1888 and, after much revision, received royal assent on 24 December.

Sections 3 and 4 were responsible for clarifying the extent of qualified privilege, "amplifying" the extension set out in section 2 of the Newspaper Libel and Registration Act 1881, which it repealed. Specifically, section 3 of the 1888 clarified that a newspaper proprietor could not be found liable for a "fair and accurate report" of court proceedings, although whether this amounted to qualified or absolute privilege was not made clear at the time. Section 4, building on the vaguer language of the 1881 Act, gave an enumerated list of cases when the defence of qualified privilege could now be used, including "any meeting of a vestry, town council, school board, board of guardians, board or local authority formed or constituted under the provisions of any Act of Parliament, or of any committee appointed by any of the above-mentioned bodies". An additional requirement placed upon proprietors wishing to claim immunity was that they be responsive to demands for a printed correction or the error in subsequent issues of the newspaper, the definition of which was inherited from the 1881 Act. Exemptions in both sections 3 and 4 existed for blasphemous libel. Section 5 allowed for the consolidation of libel actions involving the same libel against different defendants, saving on legal costs and preventing inconsistency of ruling, whilst section 8 repealed section 3 of the 1881 Act ("No prosecution for newspaper libel without fiat of Attorney General") replacing it with the condition that no "proprietor, publisher, editor or any person responsible for the publication of a newspaper" (not including journalists) be sued (or indeed tried) for libel without the order of a High Court judge.

== Subsequent developments ==
Section 9 of the Act was repealed for England and Wales by section 1(1) of, and group 1 of part I of schedule 1 to, the Statute Law (Repeals) Act 1986, which came into force on 2 May 1986.

Little of the act is still in force, as of 2012. Section 4, for example was repealed except in cases of criminal libel by the Defamation Act 1952 (and the Defamation Act 1955 in Northern Ireland), which also extended section 5 to cover both libel and slander and section 3 to cover broadcast as well as print media. Section 3 was finally repealed by section 16 and Schedule 2 of the Defamation Act 1996, which also removed blasphemous libel as a special case from section 4. The act never applied to Scotland.
