= Theatres Act 1968 =

Act of the Parliament of the United Kingdom

Theatres Act 1968 (Note: Section 20(1).)
- Act of Parliament
- Parliament of the United Kingdom
- Long title: An Act to abolish censorship of the theatre and to amend the law in respect of theatres and theatrical performances.
- Citation: 1968 c. 54
- Territorial extent: England and Wales; Scotland; Isles of Scilly; (Note: Section 20(4)–(5).)

Dates
- Royal assent: 26 July 1968
- Commencement: 26 September 1968 (Note: Section 20(2).)
Other legislation
Amends	Metropolitan Police Act 1839; City of London Police Act 1839; Hypnotism Act 1952; Defamation Act 1952; London Government Act 1963
Repeals/revokes	Theatres Act 1843
Amended by	Criminal Procedure Act 1975; Criminal Law Act 1977; Alcoholic Liquor Duties Act 1979; Criminal Justice Act 1982; Broadcasting Act 1990; Wireless Telegraphy Act 2006; Courts Act 1971; Police and Criminal Evidence Act 1984; Statute Law (Repeals) Act 1993; Licensing Act 2003; Fire (Scotland) Act 2005 (Consequential Modifications and Savings) Order 2006; Racial and Religious Hatred Act 2006; London Local Authorities Act 1991; Local Government, Planning and Land Act 1980
Relates to	Indecent Displays (Control) Act 1981; Civic Government (Scotland) Act 1982; Coroners and Justice Act 2009; Public Order Act 1986; Cable and Broadcasting Act 1984; Police and Fire Reform (Scotland) Act 2012 (Supplementary, Transitional, Transitory and Saving Provisions) Order 2013; Local Government (Scotland) Act 1973; Fire (Scotland) Act 2005 (Consequential Modifications and Savings) Order 2006; Statute Law (Repeals) Act 1977; Local Government, Planning and Land Act 1980; Local Government (Miscellaneous Provisions) Act 1982; Alcoholic Liquor Duties Act 1979

Status: Amended

Records of Parliamentary debate relating to the statute from Hansard, at TheyWorkForYou

Text of statute as originally enacted

Revised text of statute as amended

Text of the Theatres Act 1968 as in force today (including any amendments) within the United Kingdom, from legislation.gov.uk.

The Theatres Act 1968 (c. 54) is an act of the Parliament of the United Kingdom that abolished stage censorship in the United Kingdom, receiving royal assent on 26 July 1968, after passing both Houses of Parliament.

Since 1737, scripts had been licensed for performance by the Lord Chamberlain's Office (under the Theatres Act 1843, a continuation of the Licensing Act 1737) a measure initially introduced to protect Robert Walpole's administration from political satire. By the late 19th century the Lord Chamberlain's Office had become the arbiter of moral taste on the stage, and the "Angry Young Men" of the 1950s were in some ways a reaction against the banality of the morally conservative and formally restricted period of theatre that had preceded them.

Theatre critic Kenneth Tynan, whilst working with Laurence Olivier as literary manager and Dramaturg of the National Theatre Company had been campaigning for liberalisation for many years. A prosecution had succeeded in 1966 against those responsible for producing Edward Bond's play Saved at the Royal Court and John Osborne's play A Patriot for Me, cut by the censor, was put on at the Royal Court with the theatre turning itself into a private members' club. The strong response to these causes célèbres helped lead to the abolition of theatre censorship in Great Britain.
