= Defamation Act 1996 =

Act of the Parliament of the United Kingdom

Defamation Act 1996 (Note: Section 20(1).)
- Act of Parliament
- Parliament of the United Kingdom
- Long title: An Act to amend the law of defamation and to amend the law of limitation with respect to actions for defamation or malicious falsehood.
- Citation: 1996 c. 31
- Territorial extent: England and Wales (in part); Scotland (in part); Northern Ireland (in part); (Note: Section 18.)

Dates
- Royal assent: 4 July 1996
- Commencement: Various (Note: Section 19.)
Other legislation
Amends	Law of Libel Amendment Act 1888; Law Reform (Miscellaneous Provisions) (Scotland) Act 1940; Defamation Act 1952; Revision of the Army and Air Force Acts (Transitional Provisions) Act 1955; Defamation Act (Northern Ireland) 1955; Civil Evidence Act 1968; Law Reform (Miscellaneous Provisions) (Scotland) Act 1968; Civil Evidence Act (Northern Ireland) 1971; Local Government Act (Northern Ireland) 1972; Limitation Act 1980; Contempt of Court Act 1981; British Nationality Act 1981; Local Government (Access to Information) Act 1985; Administration of Justice Act 1985; Education and Libraries (Northern Ireland) Order 1986; Limitation (Northern Ireland) Order 1989; Broadcasting Act 1990
Amended by	Scotland Act 1998; Local Authorities (Executive and Alternative Arrangements) (Modification of Enactments and Other Provisions) (England) Order 2001; Local Authorities (Executive Arrangements) (Modification of Enactments) (England) Order 2002; Constitutional Reform Act 2005; Government of Wales Act 2006; Coroners and Justice Act 2009; Criminal Justice and Licensing (Scotland) Act 2010; Northern Ireland Act 1998 (Devolution of Policing and Justice Functions) Order 2010; Defamation Act 2013; Deregulation Act 2015; Defamation and Malicious Publication (Scotland) Act 2021; Defamation Act (Northern Ireland) 2022

Status: Amended

Text of statute as originally enacted

Text of the Defamation Act 1996 as in force today (including any amendments) within the United Kingdom, from legislation.gov.uk.

The Defamation Act 1996 (c. 31) is an act of the Parliament of the United Kingdom.

== Provisions ==
The act provides an innocent dissemination defence to the tort of defamation.

The act provides an "offer of amends" procedure to allow a defendant who has simply made an honest mistake or is unable to defend the libel claim to admit liability.

The act was fully implemented in February 2000.

=== Commencement ===
The following orders have been made under this section:

- The Defamation Act 1996 (Commencement No. 1) Order 1999 (SI 1999/817 (C. 26))
- The Defamation Act 1996 (Commencement No. 2) Order 2000 (SI 2000/222 (C. 7))
- The Defamation Act 1996 (Commencement No. 3 and Transitional Provision) (Scotland) Order 2001 (SSI 2001/98 (C. 3)
- The Defamation Act 1996 (Commencement No. 4) Order 2009 (SI 2009/2858 (C. 125))

== See also ==
- Defamation Act
- English defamation law
