= Broadcasting Act 1990 =

Act of the Parliament of the United Kingdom

Broadcasting Act 1990 (Note: Section 204(1).)
- Act of Parliament
- Parliament of the United Kingdom
- Long title: An Act to make new provision with respect to the provision and regulation of independent television and sound programme services and of other services provided on television or radio frequencies; to make provision with respect to the provision and regulation of local delivery services; to amend in other respects the law relating to broadcasting and the provision of television and sound programme services and to make provision with respect to the supply and use of information about programmes; to make provision with respect to the transfer of the property, rights and liabilities of the Independent Broadcasting Authority and the Cable Authority and the dissolution of those bodies; to make new provision relating to the Broadcasting Complaints Commission; to provide for the establishment and functions of a Broadcasting Standards Council; to amend the Wireless Telegraphy Acts 1949 to 1967 and the Marine, &c., Broadcasting (Offences) Act 1967; to revoke a class licence granted under the Telecommunications Act 1984 to run broadcast relay systems; and for connected purposes.
- Citation: 1990 c. 42
- Territorial extent: United Kingdom (Note: Section 204(3).)

Dates
- Royal assent: 1 November 1990
- Commencement: various (Note: Section 204(2).)
Other legislation
Amends	Parliamentary Papers Act 1840; Children and Young Persons (Scotland) Act 1937; Defamation Act 1952; Obscene Publications Act 1959; Public Bodies (Admission to Meetings) Act 1960; Marine, &c., Broadcasting (Offences) Act 1967; House of Commons Disqualification Act 1975; Restrictive Trade Practices Act 1976
Amended by	Value Added Tax Act 1994; Private Hire (London) Act 1998; Defamation Act 1996; Broadcasting Act 1996; Wireless Telegraphy Act 1998; Registration of Political Parties Act 1998; Youth Justice and Criminal Evidence Act 1999; Communications Act 2003; Statute Law (Repeals) Act 2004; Wireless Telegraphy Act 2006; Digital Economy Act 2010; Scotland Act 2012; Scotland Act 2016; Digital Economy Act 2017

Status: Amended

Text of statute as originally enacted

Revised text of statute as amended

Text of the Broadcasting Act 1990 as in force today (including any amendments) within the United Kingdom, from legislation.gov.uk.

The Broadcasting Act 1990 (c. 42) is an act of the Parliament of the United Kingdom, which aimed to liberalise and deregulate the British broadcasting industry by promoting competition; an example being ITV, in particular, which had earlier been described by Margaret Thatcher as "the last bastion of restrictive practices". The act was initiated in part due to a 1989 European Council Directive (89/552), also known as the Television Without Frontiers directive, and came about after the findings from the Peacock Committee.

It led directly to the abolition of the Independent Broadcasting Authority and its replacement with the Independent Television Commission and Radio Authority (both themselves now replaced by Ofcom), which were given the task of regulating the broadcasting industry with weaker powers compared to the previous authority.

== The act ==
The act abolished the Independent Broadcasting Authority (IBA) and Cable Authority, which were replaced by the Independent Television Commission (ITC) and Radio Authority. The ITC began regulating cable television, which was previously the remit and responsibility of the Cable Authority, in addition to terrestrial television from the IBA which only regulated ITV, Channel 4 and British Satellite Broadcasting. Meanwhile, the Radio Authority siphoned off radio broadcasting from the IBA.

It allowed for the creation of a fifth analogue terrestrial television channel in the United Kingdom, and stipulated that the BBC, which had previously produced the vast majority of its television programming in-house, was now obliged to source at least 25% of its output from independent production companies.

Additionally, in the letter of the law, the television or radio companies rather than the regulator became the broadcasters as had been the case with the IBA before 1964, when it had fewer regulatory powers than it would later assume.

== Effects ==
=== In television ===
In television, the Act paved the way for the establishment of Channel 5, enabling the growth of multichannel satellite television.

The Act has sometimes been described, both as praise and as criticism, as a key enabling force for Rupert Murdoch's ambitions in Britain. It reformed the system of awarding ITV franchises, which proved controversial when Thames Television was replaced by Carlton Television, for what some felt were political reasons (see Death on the Rock), and when TV-am, admired by Thatcher for its management's defiance of the trade unions, lost its franchise to GMTV (the now-former Prime Minister personally apologised to the senior TV-am executive Bruce Gyngell). It also allowed companies holding ITV franchises to merge with each other starting in 1994, beginning the process which eventually led to all franchises in England and Wales coming under the control of ITV plc in 2004.

=== In radio ===
In radio, it allowed for the launch of three Independent National Radio stations, two of them on medium wave using frequencies formerly used by the BBC, and the other on FM using frequencies formerly used by the emergency services. It set out plans for many more local and regional commercial radio stations, generally using parts of the FM band not previously used for broadcasting, which have since come to fruition. Its plans for expanding community radio were only really developed in the 2000s.

== Controversy ==
The Act passed through Parliament despite opposition from much of the Labour Party and from some members of the ruling Conservative Party, who saw it as representative of a decline in standards, and on occasions saw it as enabling what was, for them, an unwelcome Americanisation. Notably, Douglas Hurd has since criticised the Act's after-effects, describing it as "one of the less successful reforms of those years". These Conservatives would have described their position as paternalistic as a term of praise, while supporters of the Act would use it against them as a term of abuse. During Tony Blair's tenure as leader, the Labour Party's broadcasting policy generally shifted much more towards that expounded in the Act.

The then Home Secretary, David Waddington, described the Act as heralding "a massive expansion in choice", and supporters of the multichannel age in British broadcasting have praised the Act, and later regulation influenced by it, for such reasons. Supporters of the previous, more regulated system have strongly criticised the Act, and some have blamed it for what they see as a "dumbing down" of British television and radio. Like many other reforms of the Thatcher years, it has a tendency to polarise opinion very strongly. One initially less-obvious effect of the Act was that technical standards ceased to be monitored and enforced by the regulatory body along with the programme content.

== See also ==
- History of ITV
- Television Act 1954
- Communications Act 2003

== Bibliography ==
Conley, Janet L. (1993). "Hollywood's last hurrah? "Television without frontiers" Directive may close borders to the European Community's broadcast market". Journal of International Law. 14 (1). University of Pennsylvania. ISSN 0891-9895. OCLC 769893140. Archived from the original on 11 January 2023.
