= Criminal libel =

Legal term in English common law

Criminal libel is a legal term, of English origin, which may be used with one of two distinct meanings, in those common law jurisdictions where it is still used.

It is an alternative name for the common law offence which is also known (in order to distinguish it from other offences of libel) as "defamatory libel" or, occasionally, as "criminal defamatory libel".

It is also used as a collective term for all offences which consist of the publication of some prohibited matter in a libel (in permanent form), namely defamatory libel, seditious libel, blasphemous libel and obscene libel.

The common law offences of seditious libel, defamatory libel, and obscene libel were abolished in England and Wales and Northern Ireland on 12 January 2010 when section 73 of the Coroners and Justice Act 2009 came into force, blasphemous libel having already been abolished in England and Wales on 8 July 2008 by the Criminal Justice and Immigration Act 2008. The Racial and Religious Hatred Act 2006 created instead the offence of inciting hatred against a person on the grounds of their race or religion.

Samoa's Crimes Act 2013 dropped reference to criminal libel, which had been on the statute books as part of the Crimes Act 1961.
