= Qualified privilege =

Legal defence to defamation

The defence of qualified privilege permits a person in a position of authority or trust to make statements or relay or report statements that would be considered slander and libel if made by anyone else.

== New Zealand and Canada ==
In New Zealand and Ontario, for instance, cases of political libel are inhibited by permitting open discussion of an allegation or rumor, if conducted responsibly and with due care for the privacy of the person whose reputation would be affected. This privilege generally does not extend to repetition of discredited statements, malice, or comments made out of process or out of order in the organization or institution in which the position of authority is held.

== United Kingdom ==
The defence of qualified privilege became very important in the UK, especially after a case involving allegations made by the Sunday Times against the Irish Taoiseach Albert Reynolds. During that case the judge outlined a ten-point test of 'responsible journalism'. If reporters and editors followed these points, the judge said, they would enjoy a degree of protection from libel action, even if they could not prove factual allegations. The defence was abolished in England and Wales by the Defamation Act 2013, which replaced it with the statutory defences of publication on a matter of public interest and peer-reviewed statements in a scientific or academic journal.

To qualify for this defense, a report is required to be one of a public meeting or press conference that is:

- fair,
- accurate,
- published without malice,
- subject to the right of reply in the form of a letter that gives explanation or contradiction.

It need not be contemporaneous (depending on publication), where it has to be for absolute privilege.

== See also ==
- Parliamentary immunity
- Speech or Debate Clause
