= Defamation Act 2013 =

Defamation law reform in England and Wales

Defamation Act 2013 (Note: Section 17(1).)
- Act of Parliament
- Parliament of the United Kingdom
- Long title: An Act to amend the law of defamation.
- Citation: 2013 c. 26
- Introduced by: Kenneth Clarke MP (Commons); Lord McNally (Lords)
- Territorial extent: England and Wales; except that sections 6 and 7(9) and 15 and 17 and, in so far as it relates to sections 6 and 7(9), section 16(5), also extend to Scotland; (Note: Section 17(2)–(3).)

Dates
- Royal assent: 25 April 2013
- Commencement: 25 April 2013 (in part) (Note: Section 17(6).); 1 January 2014 (rest of act) (Note: The Defamation Act 2013 (Commencement) (England and Wales) Order 2013 (SI 2013/3027) and the Defamation Act 2013 (Commencement) (Scotland) Order 2013 (SSII 2013/339).)
Other legislation
Amends	Defamation Act 1952; Rehabilitation of Offenders Act 1974; Senior Courts Act 1981; County Courts Act 1984; Defamation Act 1996
Repeals/revokes	Slander of Women Act 1891
Amended by	Civil Jurisdiction and Judgments (Amendment) (EU Exit) Regulations 2019; Defamation and Malicious Publication (Scotland) Act 2021

Status: Amended

History of passage through Parliament

Text of statute as originally enacted

Revised text of statute as amended

The Defamation Act 2013 (c. 26) is an act of the Parliament of the United Kingdom, which changed English defamation law on issues of the right to freedom of expression and the protection of reputation. It also comprised a response to perceptions that the law as it stood was giving rise to libel tourism and other inappropriate claims.

The act changed existing criteria for a successful claim, by requiring claimants to show actual or probable serious harm (which, in the case of for-profit bodies, is restricted to serious financial loss), before suing for defamation in England or Wales, setting limits on geographical relevance, removing the previous presumption in favour of a trial by jury, and curtailing sharply the scope for claims of continuing defamation (in which republication or continued visibility constitutes ongoing renewed defamation). It also enhanced existing defences, by introducing a defence for website operators hosting user-generated content (provided they comply with a procedure to enable the complainant to resolve disputes directly with the author of the material concerned or otherwise remove it), and introducing new statutory defences of truth, honest opinion, and "publication on a matter of public interest" or privileged publications (including peer reviewed scientific journals), to replace the common law defences of justification, fair comment, and the Reynolds defence respectively. However, it did not quite codify defamation law into a single statute.

The Defamation Act 2013 applies to causes of action occurring after its commencement on 1 January 2014; old libel law therefore still applied to many 2014–15 defamation cases where the events complained of took place before commencement.

== Changes and repeals ==
The act changed a number of defamation procedures. All defamation cases under the Senior Courts Act 1981 in the Queens Bench Division, and the County Courts Act 1984, which were "tried with a jury" unless the trial requires prolonged examination of documents, are now "tried without a jury", unless the court orders otherwise. Such cases are referred through a Defamation Recognition Commission (DRC) to a new Independent Regulatory Board (IRB), to provide arbitration services. The courts should take into account, when awarding costs and damages, whether either party in a dispute has chosen not to use the arbitration service. A successful party is required to pay all of the proceedings costs, if such a party unreasonably refused to use the arbitration service. Judgment awards of exemplary damages, where a defendant is guilty of breach of a defendant's rights, can take into account whether either party refused to use, or join the arbitration service. Courts should take into account whether defendant first sought advice from the IRB before publication.

- The common law defence of justification is abolished; as such, section 5 of the Defamation Act 1952 (justification) is repealed.
- The common law defence of fair comment is abolished; as such, section 6 of the Defamation Act 1952 (fair comment) is repealed.
- The common law defence known as the Reynolds defence is abolished.
- Section 8 of the Rehabilitation of Offenders Act 1974 (defamation actions) is amended.
- The Slander of Women Act 1891 is repealed.
- The publication of a statement that conveys the imputation that a person has a contagious or infectious disease does not give rise to a cause of action for slander unless the publication causes the person special damage.

== Defences ==
- Requirement of serious harm: "A statement is not defamatory unless its publication has caused or is likely to cause serious harm to the reputation of the claimant". Strictly speaking this is not a defence, but an element of the tort for which the burden of proof lies with the claimant.
- Truth: It is a defence for defamation to show the imputation in the statement complained of is substantially true. If one or more of the imputations is not true, the defence does not fail if the imputations not shown to be true do not seriously harm the claimant's reputation. The common law defence of justification is abolished, as such section 5 of the Defamation Act 1952 is repealed.
- Honest opinion: It is a defence for defamation, to show the statement complained of was a statement of opinion; that it indicated, in general or specific terms, the basis of the opinion; that an honest person could have held the opinion on any fact which existed when the statement was published, including any fact in a privileged statement that was pre-published. The defence is defeated if the claimant shows the defendant did not hold the opinion. Opinion does not apply where the statement was published by the defendant, but made by another person (the author), and in such a case the defence is defeated if the defendant knew, or ought to have known, the author did not hold the opinion. A statement is a "privileged statement" if the person responsible for its publication could prove it was a publication on matter of public interest, or was a peer-reviewed statement in scientific or academic journal, Defamation Act 1996 reports of court proceedings protected by absolute privilege, or under other reports protected by qualified privilege. The common law defence of fair comment is abolished; as such, section 6 of the Defamation Act 1952 is repealed.
- Public interest: It is a defence to show the statement complained of was, or formed part of, a matter of public interest, and a publication was reasonably believed to be in the public interest. If the statement was a part of a dispute to which the claimant was a party, the court determines whether it was in the public interest, and must disregard the defendant's omissions to verify the truth of the imputation. In determining a reasonable belief of public interest, the court must make allowance for editorial judgment. For the avoidance of doubt, the defence may be relied upon irrespective of whether it is a statement of fact or a statement of opinion. The common law defence known as the Reynolds defence is abolished.
- Peer-reviewed statement in a scientific or academic journal: The publication of a statement in a scientific or academic journal (whether published in electronic form or otherwise) is privileged if the statement relates to a scientific or academic matter, and, before it was published, an independent review of the statement's merit was carried out by the journal's editor and persons with expertise in the matter concerned. Where the statement is privileged, any assessment, extract or summary of the statement's merit is also privileged. A publication is not privileged if it is shown to be made with malice. This defence is not to be construed as protecting the publication of matter prohibited by law.

=== Websites ===
- Operators of websites: In an action against a website operator, on a statement posted on the website, it is a defence to show that it was not the operator who posted the statement on the website. The defence is defeated if it was not possible for the claimant to identify the person who posted the statement, or the claimant gave the operator a notice of complaint and the operator failed to respond in accordance with regulations. A claimant can "identify" a person only if they have sufficient information to bring proceedings against the person. Regulations (made by the Secretary of State) may determine the action to be taken in response to a notice of complaint, such as identity, contact details and time limits for removals, subject to the court's discretion. A notice of complaint must specify the complainant's name, the statement concerned and explain why it is defamatory, and specify where on the website it was posted. Where a court gives judgment for the claimant in an action the court may order the defendant to publish a summary of the judgment. Regulations may make provision in which a notice, which is not a notice of complaint, is to be treated as a notice of complaint. The defence is defeated if the claimant shows that the operator of the website acted with malice in the posting of the statement. The defence is not defeated if the website operator moderates statements posted on it by others.

=== Jurisdiction ===
- Non-natural persons: This section applies to actions for defamation brought by (a) a body corporate (b) another non-natural legal person trading for profit or (c) a trade association representing organisations trading for profit. Court permission must be obtained to bring an action in these sections. The application should be struck out, unless the body corporate can show the publication or matters complained of has caused, or is likely to cause, substantial financial loss to the claimant. Non-natural persons performing a public function do not have an action in defamation against any statement concerning that function.
- Action against a person not domiciled in the UK: A court does not have jurisdiction to hear and determine any action against a person not domiciled in the UK, unless the court is satisfied that, of all the places in which the statement complained of has been published, England and Wales is clearly the most appropriate. "Domiciled in the United Kingdom" is defined by Sections 41 and 42 of the Civil Jurisdiction and Judgments Act 1982. Until the Brexit implementation period ended on 1 January 2021, courts also had jurisdiction against a person domiciled in another member state of the European Union or in a state that was a contracting party to the Brussels Regulations of the Lugano Convention.

== Northern Ireland ==
At the behest of Finance Minister Sammy Wilson, the Northern Ireland Assembly refused to approve the new Defamation Act, meaning the old UK laws still apply there. Proponents of the law and Irish authors have warned that Belfast might replace London as the new capital for "libel tourism". Additionally, there are worries that UK newspapers would either need to end Northern Ireland editions, or else be forced to comply by the old guidelines in their stories.

There was a consultation for a review of the Defamation Law by the Northern Ireland Department of Finance from the 13th of November 2023 to the 26th of January 2024, with a report regarding the review being published on the 8th of July that year. Findings in this report from stakeholders and commentators stated that at the time, it was too soon to say what impact the law had to date or what its long term impact may have been, the fact that the ending of the presumption being in favour of jury trials has been welcomed, along with criticism towards the assembly not being able to secure sufficient support for the Serious Harm Test (Intended to deter actions where the alleged defamatory statement is likely to have little impact on the reputation of the claimant). It also identidied that Online Defamation, Strategic Litigation Against Public Participation (SLAPPs), Libel Tourism, Access to Justice and Alternative Dispute Resolution (ADR) were the issues in Defamation Law and Policy at the time, but also that it was too soon to bring forward further legislative reform in this area.

== See also ==
- English defamation law
- Censorship in the United Kingdom
- Libel tourism
- Civil Procedure Rules
- Civil procedure in England and Wales
- Justice and Security Act 2013
- Jurisprudence
- Human rights
- Political science
- Philosophy of law
- Rule of law
- Rule according to higher law
