= Philip Wayne Powell =

American historian (1913–1987)

Philip Wayne Powell (1913 – 1987) was an American historian specializing in the Spanish colonial history of the American Southwest.

== Biography ==
He was born in Chino, California, attended Occidental College and transferred to the University of California, Berkeley, receiving his B.A. in 1936. He undertook graduate studies at Berkeley, taking Hispanic studies with Herbert I. Priestley and Herbert E. Bolton. Powell completed his Ph.D. in 1941, and joined the Army.

In 1943 he taught at the University of Pennsylvania and in 1944 at Northwestern University. In 1947 he was hired by the University of California, Santa Barbara, where he taught in a growing department, soon joined by Wilbur R. Jacobs, Donald Marquand Dozer, C. Warren Hollister, Joachim Remak, Leonard Marsak, Frank J. Frost, Robert O. Collins, Alfred Gollin, and Otis L. Graham, and many other scholars. Powell retired and became Professor Emeritus in 1981. His research focused on the theme of the Spanish borderlands between Hispanic and Anglo-Saxon America and the earliest colonial history of the American Southwest.

Among his several influential books are Soldiers, Indians, and Silver: The Northward Advance of New Spain, 1550-1600 (1952) and Mexico's Miguel Caldera: The Taming of America's First Frontier, 1548-1594 (1977). Tree of Hate: Propaganda and Prejudices Affecting Relations with the Hispanic World (1971) is about the relations between the United States and Spain with Latin America.

Powell died of a heart attack in Santa Barbara on September 17, 1987. The Philip and Maria Powell Prize was established in the History Department at UCSB to recognize outstanding graduate students in Latin American or Iberian history.
