= The Libel Tourist =

- Directed by: Jared Lapidus
- Written by: Jared Lapidus; Sheldon Lapidus
- Produced by: Thor Halvorssen; Rob Pfaltzgraff
- Narrated by: Dave Benson
- Music by: Allan Fox
- Production company: Moving Picture Institute
- Release date: November 15, 2007
- Running time: 8 minutes
- Country: United States
- Languages: English; Arabic

The Libel Tourist is a short-form documentary film about how the advantageous litigative environments that exist in certain jurisdictions are used by powerful individuals to suppress unfavorable information about them by bringing forth unjustified libel suits against writers and publishers. The seeking out of such favorable environments, most notably the courts of England and Wales, has been dubbed libel tourism.

== Purpose ==
British MPs have criticized the libel laws as being "Soviet-style" tools with which the rich and powerful hide their secrets. The filmmakers have expressed their concern about the threat that such laws pose to the freedoms of speech and of the press around the world, and intend to use the film as a means by which the dangers of such practices can be brought to public attention.

== Film content ==
=== Sheikh Khalid bin Mahfouz's operations ===
The film focuses on the libel suit brought forth in English courts by Saudi Sheikh Khalid bin Mahfouz against writer and terrorism and political corruption expert Dr. Rachel Ehrenfeld. Bin Mahfouz claimed that the allegations that Dr. Ehrenfeld made against him in her book Funding Evil were libelous, as he had never "knowingly funded terrorism". While Dr. Ehrenfeld never makes any assertions about the degree of bin Mahfouz's cognizance of the alleged funding, she does say that bin Mahfouz founded and/or operates a number of bogus front organizations that operate under the guise of charities, but whose actual objectives are frequently the funding and support of terrorist organizations like al-Qaeda, Hamas, and Hezbollah. Examples of such organizations are the Muwafaq ("Blessed Relief") Foundation, the International Islamic Relief Organization (HRO), and the National Commercial Bank (NCB). These claims have been bolstered by some degree by the U.S. Treasury Department, who in October 2001, froze the assets of Yasin al-Qadi, another Saudi who had been hired to run the Muwafaq Foundation "charity", who they listed as a supporter of terrorism.

=== Causes of libel tourism's prevalence ===
The film asserts that "because English courts aren't bound by a written constitution that protects freedom of expression" (in contrast to the courts of the United States) England has become a haven for those seeking to suppress information via libel lawsuits. This is given as the reason why bin Mahfouz filed his lawsuit in the U.K., rather than in the U.S., where the book was initially published. Ehrenfeld ignored the English courts in an effort to avoid a costly legal battle.

Regardless of the evidence supporter Dr. Ehrenfeld's allegations, she claims that as soon as bin Mahfouz's lawyers presented their case to Lord Justice Eady, and he was told that the foreword of Dr. Ehrenfeld's book was written by former Director of the Central Intelligence Agency R. James Woolsey, he was eager to award judgment in bin Mahfouz's favor, along with an injunction. Ehrenfeld was ordered to pay fines and expenses of £114,386.52, publish an apology, and physically destroy all copies of her book remaining in England.

=== Outcome of litigations ===
Ehrenfeld filed an appeal in American federal court, which ultimately led to the SPEECH Act, which protects Americans from the rulings of foreign libel judgments, unless they comply with the U.S. First Amendment, marking a major victory in the protection of the free press.

== Critical reception ==
Reviewers have lauded the concise poignance of the film, calling it a "chilling 8-minutes" that adeptly explain the importance of the protection of the freedom of media, and have praised the filmmakers for covering an important topic that is conspicuously overlooked by other media outlets.
