= Roderick Nash =

American historian

Roderick Frazier Nash is a professor emeritus of history and environmental studies at the University of California Santa Barbara.

== Scholarly biography ==
Nash received his Bachelor of Arts from Harvard University in 1960 and his Ph.D. from the University of Wisconsin–Madison in 1965. He is the author of several books and essays. His dissertation, "Wilderness and the American Mind," done under the supervision of Merle Curti, became what has come to be seen as one of the foundational texts of the field of environmental history. After teaching for two years at Dartmouth College, he was called to the History Department at the University of California, Santa Barbara where he joined historians such as Wilbur Jacobs, Robert O. Collins, Frank J. Frost, C. Warren Hollister, Leonard Marsak, and Joachim Remak. After witnessing an oil spill in Santa Barbara in 1969, he and a number of other faculty members became active within the university and founded an environmental studies program there in 1970. Since the initial 12 graduates in 1972, there have been 4,000 graduates within 300 separate majors. Nash is an advocate for environmental education and an avid white-water river rafter.

== Wilderness and the American Mind ==
Nash's study in this book concerns the attitude of Americans' toward the idea of wilderness. He discusses the different attitudes that Americans have had toward nature since colonization and the changing uses and definitions of 'wilderness' in that context. Specifically, Nash describes the evolution of American wilderness conception through Transcendentalism, Primitivism, Preservationism, to Conservationism. Nash states that if wilderness is to survive, we must, paradoxically, manage wilderness – at the very least, our behavior towards the wilderness must be managed.

== See also ==
- Environmental history of the United States

== Bibliography ==
- The Wisdom of Aldo Leopold (Fall 1961) Wisconsin Academy Review Volume 8, Number 4
- Philanthropy in the Shaping of American Higher Education (1965). Co-authored with Merle Curti
- Wilderness and the American Mind (1967).
- The American Environment: Readings in the History of Conservation (1968).
- The Call of the Wild 1900–1916 (1970).
- Environment and Americans: The Problem of Priorities (1972).
- The Big Drops: Ten Legendary Rapids (1978). Co-authored with Robert O. Collins
- The Rights of Nature: A History of Environmental Ethics (1989).
- American Environmentalism: Readings in Conservation History (1990).
- The Nervous Generation: American Thought, 1917–1930 (1990).

Also by Nash, Roderick:

- From These Beginnings: A Biographical Approach to American History, Volume I and II.
