= Dimitrije Đorđević (historian) =

Serbian historian (1922–2009)

- Born: Dimitrije Đorđević; 27 February 1922; Belgrade, Kingdom of Serbs, Croats and Slovenes
- Died: 5 March 2009 (aged 87); Santa Barbara, California, U.S.
- Other name: Mita
- Occupation: historian

Dimitrije "Mita" Đorđević (Serbian: Димитрије Ђорђевић; 27 February 1922 – 5 March 2009) was a Serbian historian of modern European history, especially of the Balkans.

== Biography ==
Đorđević was born in Belgrade to a prominent Serbian family. When he was a law student, the Germans invaded Yugoslavia during World War II and he joined the resistance movement of Dragoljub Mihailović (Chetniks). Đorđević was captured by the Germans and was imprisoned, ultimately in Mauthausen-Gusen concentration camp in Austria. He survived the war, but was in turn imprisoned by the communist regime in post World War II Yugoslavia. After he was pardoned and released, Đorđević was eventually allowed to commence study at the University of Belgrade, where he was a student of Vaso Čubrilović (one of the members of the Young Bosnia who conspired to assassinate Franz Ferdinand which led to the outbreak of World War I). Đorđević was awarded his doctorate in 1962. In 1970, Đorđević took up a position as a Full Professor of History at the University of California, Santa Barbara, joining a strong faculty in European History including Joachim Remak, Frank J. Frost, Leonard Marsak, Alfred Gollin, and C. Warren Hollister. He was elected a member of the Serbian Academy of Science and Arts in 1985. A popular undergraduate lecturer and graduate mentor at the University of California, Santa Barbara, in 1992 many of his former students contributed to his Festschrift entitled Scholar, Patriot, Mentor: Historical Essays in Honor of Dimitrije Djordjevic. In retirement, Đorđević published his autobiography, Scars and Memory: Four Lives in One Lifetime, describing his World War II and post World War II experiences. Professor Đorđević died in Santa Barbara on March 5, 2009.

== Publications ==
- The Growth of Serbia to the Adriatic Sea and the Conference of Ambassadors, 1912 (Belgrade, 1956). [In Serbian]
- Austro-Serbian Conflict over the Novibazar Railway Project (Belgrade, 1957). [In Serbian]
- The Customs War Between Austria-Hungary and Serbia, with Jorjo Tadić (Belgrade, 1962). [In Serbian]
- Milovan Milovanović (Belgrade, 1962). [In Serbian]
- The National Revolutions of the Balkan Peoples (Belgrade, 1965). [In French]
- History of Serbia, 1900-1918 (Thessalonika, 1970). [In Modern Greek]
- The Creation of Yugoslavia (Santa Barbara, 1980).
- The Balkan Revolutionary Tradition with Stephen Fischer-Galati (NY, 1981).
- East Central European Society and the Balkan Wars co-edited with Bela K. Kiraly (NY, 1987).
- Scars and Memory: Four Lives in One Lifetime (NY, 1994).
