= Censorship in the United Kingdom =

In the United Kingdom, censorship has been applied to various forms of expression such as the media, cinema, entertainment venues, literature, theatre and criticism of the monarchy. There is no general right to the freedom of speech in the UK; however, since 1998, limited freedom of expression is guaranteed according to Article 10 of the European Convention on Human Rights, as applied in British law through the Human Rights Act 1998.

Current law allows for restrictions on threatening or abusive words or behaviour intending or likely to cause harassment, alarm or distress or cause a breach of the peace, sending another any article which is indecent or grossly offensive with an intent to cause distress or anxiety, incitement, incitement to racial hatred, incitement to religious hatred, incitement to terrorism including encouragement of terrorism and dissemination of terrorist publications, glorifying terrorism, collection or possession of a document or record containing information likely to be of use to a terrorist, treason, obscenity, indecency including corruption of public morals and outraging public decency, defamation, prior restraint, restrictions on court reporting (including names of victims and evidence and prejudicing or interfering with court proceedings, prohibition of post-trial interviews with jurors), time, manner, and place restrictions, harassment, privileged communications, trade secrets, classified material, copyright, patents, military conduct, and limitations on commercial speech such as advertising.

== Ministry of Information ==
The Ministry of Information was created during the First World War and then reformed for the Second World War for propaganda purposes. In the Second World War it was located at the Senate House of the University of London. During the Second World War it was infamous for having a staff of 999.

The Ministry was responsible for keeping much information out of the public domain during the war years, as it was thought that this would have been harmful to the national sentiment. It also censored many press reports that were not deemed to be sufficiently patriotic, or that listed military operations to a level of detail that could be used by the enemy.

The Ministry took over the General Post Office Film Unit, renaming it the Crown Film Unit. It produced documentaries such as Target for Tonight (1941), Western Approaches (1944) and London Can Take It! (1940). It also created a feature-length fictional film; 49th Parallel (1941). Following this it solely created documentaries, although it also laid down propaganda guidelines for commercial films.

The Ministry was disbanded following the end of the Second World War.

== Issues due to be discussed in parliament: 14-day rule ==
From 1944 to the end of 1956, it was forbidden to discuss an issue on British radio or television during the fortnight before it was debated in parliament, sometimes called the "14-day rule". In October 1955, Prime Minister Anthony Eden explained and supported the rule in parliament, saying:

[the] practice which has been followed by agreement between the British Broadcasting Corporation and the major political parties for some years. The rule was originated by the B.B.C. and in its present form dates back to 1948. The Government continue to believe that the principle embodied in this rule is in the best interests of Parliament for many reasons, some of which my predecessor in office gave the House in February of this year. I understand that the right hon. Gentlemen on the opposite Front Bench also continue to share this view, and I, on behalf of the Government, believe that the existing practice should continue.

He went on to further advise Members of Parliament "not to regard [look at] newspapers when they are discussing what they are going to say in this House."

The rule was started in 1944 by the BBC itself, then at the request of the BBC, which had wanted the rule changed to be at the BBC's discretion, it was imposed by the government, which had the support of the three main political party leaders, in July 1955 by a direction to the BBC under Clause 15(4) of their licence and to the Independent Television Authority under Section 9(2) of the Television Act 1954. The rule did not cover the simple reporting of Parliamentary proceedings. However the direction made clear the rule also covered the extended period from the introduction of legislation into parliament until it received the Royal Assent (or was dropped), which MP Jean Mann argued was an extension to the previous rule.

Following a report by the Select Committee on Anticipation of Parliamentary Debates, and after receiving assurances from the British Broadcasting Corporation, the Independent Television Authority and its programme companies that they would continue to support the primacy of Parliament as the forum for debating the affairs of the nation, in December 1956 Eden suspended the 14-day rule for an experimental period to the end of the parliamentary session (about six months). On 25 July 1957, the suspension was extended for an indefinite period. By then a hypothesis had formed that the reason for the rule was to support party discipline by reducing the ability of back-bench MPs and political activists to appeal directly to voters.

== Laws on obscenity and sexual content ==
Obscenity law in England and Wales is currently governed by the various Obscene Publications Acts, and Section 63 of the Criminal Justice and Immigration Act 2008 but obscenity laws go back much further into the English common law.

The conviction in 1727 of Edmund Curll for the publication of Venus in the Cloister or The Nun in her Smock under the common law offence of disturbing the King's peace was the first conviction for obscenity in Great Britain, and set a legal precedent for other convictions.

A defence against the charge of obscenity on the grounds of literary merit was introduced in the Obscene Publications Act 1959. The OPA was tested in the high-profile obscenity trial brought against Penguin Books for publishing Lady Chatterley's Lover (by D. H. Lawrence) in 1960. The book was found to have merit, and Penguin Books was found not guilty—a ruling which granted far more freedom to publish explicit material. This trial did not establish the 'merit' defence as an automatic right; several controversial books and publications were the subject of British court cases throughout the 1960s and into the 1970s. Last Exit to Brooklyn, a 1964 novel by the American author Hubert Selby Jr was subject of a private prosecution in 1966.

The distinction between legal erotic literature and illegal pornography was traditionally made in the English-speaking courts on the basis of perceived literary merit. No prosecutions of purely textual pornography took place following the Inside Linda Lovelace trial of 1976 until October 2008, when a man was charged (but later cleared) under the Obscene Publications Act after allegedly posting fictional written material to the Internet describing the kidnap, rape and murder of the pop group Girls Aloud (the R v Walker trial). In late August 2005 the government announced that it planned to criminalise possession of extreme pornographic material, rather than just publication, and the law came into force as Section 63 of the Criminal Justice and Immigration Act 2008.

Under Section 69 of the Serious Crime Act 2015, not only creation but also possession of manuals giving advice how to groom or abuse children is also outlawed.

Almost all adult stores in the UK are forbidden from having their goods in open display under the Indecent Displays Act 1981, which means the shop fronts are often boarded up or covered in posters. A warning sign must be clearly shown at the entrance to the store, and no items can be visible from the street. No customer can be under eighteen years old. The Video Recordings Act 1984 introduced the R18-rated classification for videos that are only available in licensed sex shops, but hardcore pornographic magazines are available in newsagents in some places. The Ann Summers chain of lingerie and sex shops won the right to advertise for workers in job centres, which was originally banned under restrictions on what advertising could be carried out by the sex industry.

In February 2026, Labour Lord Baroness Levitt introduced Amendment 278 to criminalize the creation and sharing of semen tributes without explicit consent.

=== Consensual pornography ===
In 2025 and 2026, the 59th Parliament of the United Kingdom introduced several amendments to criminalize pornography categories, including pornography of consenting adults.

Lord Baroness Levitt introduced Amendment 294 in February 2026 to criminalize distribution or possession of pornographic depictions of strangulation portrayed "in an explicit and realistic way". The amendment would criminalize the erotic asphyxiation category of pornography with penalties of up to 5 years in prison.

Amendment 297 was also introduced by Lord Baroness Levitt to criminalize distribution or possession of pornographic depictions of incest if a reasonable person would find the participants "were related, or pretending to be related". The amendment would criminalize the incest pornography category of pornography with penalties of up to 5 years in prison.

In March 2026, Conservative Lord Baroness Bertin introduced Amendment 300A to criminalize distribution or possession of pornographic depictions of "a person who appears to be or is implied to be a child" including consenting adults. The amendment would criminalize the ageplay category of pornography, with Lord Bertin stating it would be "extending the offence of making an indecent photograph of a child to pornographic material that depicts a child when that role is being played by an adult" and "this is a deliberate choice, with settings in children’s bedrooms, actors in children’s clothes and braces, toys, pigtails and other markers of childhood".

=== Mull of Kintyre test ===
Kintyre highlighted in red. The "Mull of Kintyre" properly refers to the headland at the south-westernmost point, but in this context the apparent angle of the whole peninsula is the relevant standard against which a penis would be compared.

According to an urban legend, the Mull of Kintyre test or Mull of Kintyre rule was an unofficial guideline used by the British Board of Film Classification (BBFC) to decide whether an image of a penis could be shown. According to the myth, the BBFC would not permit the general release of a film or video if it depicted a penis erect to the point that the angle it made from the vertical was higher than that of the peninsula of Kintyre in Argyll and Bute on maps of Scotland. This test has often been called "the angle of the dangle".

The Mull of Kintyre test was said to have first been used for the release of the controversial erotic historical drama film Caligula in 1979.

== Stage licensing ==
Historically, stage plays were under considerable censorship in England. Under the reigns of Henry VIII, Edward VI, Elizabeth and James, restrictions were imposed on what stage plays could portray. Censorship of stage plays was exercised by the Master of the Revels in England by about 1600 until the English Civil War in 1642.

In 1737, partly as a result of political attacks by Henry Fielding against Robert Walpole, Parliament enacted a law that established "the Examiner of the Stage" (an official in the Lord Chamberlain's office) to censor plays on the basis of both politics and morals (i.e. sexual impropriety, blasphemy, and foul language). Plays had to be licensed by the Lord Chamberlain. In 1737, through the influence of the Duke of Grafton, the Shakespearian commentator Edward Capell was appointed with an annual salary of £200 as deputy-examiner of plays. This censorship by licensing requirement was finally abolished by the Theatres Act 1968.

According to Rufus Osgood Mason (who gives an example of a written licence from 1814):

Charles Kemble, later in life, received the appointment of "Examiner of Plays". The duties consisted in reading the plays which had been accepted by the managers of the different theatres, to see that they contained nothing objectionable either on the score of politics or morals. Those that were approved were reported to the Lord Chamberlain who issued the licence.

== Libel law ==
England and Wales have relatively strict libel laws ("defamation" in Scotland) in that they are often considered pro plaintiff, with the defendant asked to prove that they did not commit libel. Compensation awards for libel are also unlimited, in contrast to those for personal injury. Further controversy surrounds the libel laws with regard to costs. Whilst costs can be awarded, the ability both to bring and to defend libel cases is often considered to be restricted to the wealthy. Conversely, it is possible to initiate a "no win – no fee" case against a wealthy individual or organisation if the individual bringing the case has insignificant assets, as even if the case is lost, the wealthy individual or organisation are unable to recover their costs. Typically in such cases an out of court settlement is forced upon the wealthy individual or organisation.

A relevant example is the case of Simon Singh's lawsuit, where the author and journalist Simon Singh was sued by the British Chiropractic Association for criticism of chiropractic therapy which rested on a summary of recent scientific research. Singh was able to pursue a legal defence because of his earnings from four best-sellers.

In another case, the UK based academic publisher Equinox was forced to remove a peer reviewed academic article from its publication International Journal of Speech, Language and the Law. The article "Charlatanry in forensic speech science: A problem to be taken seriously" was a metastudy of lie detector research and came to the conclusion that lie detectors do not work. The Israeli manufacturer of lie detectors Nemesysco forced the publisher to remove the already published article from the online databases, and the journal was also forced to publish an apology in a later issue.

On 15 March 2011, a draft Defamation Bill (CP3/11) was published by the Ministry of Justice with an accompanying "consultation paper containing provisions for reforming the law to strike the right balance between protection of freedom of speech and protection of reputation". The consultation closed on 10 June 2011. The Defamation Act 2013 reformed English defamation law to require serious harm (meaning specifically financial harm in the case of a corporate complainant), to tighten personal jurisdiction, and to replace the existing common law defences with defences of truth, honest opinion, publication on a matter of public interest, and peer-reviewed publication in a scientific or academic journal. It comprised a response to perceptions that the law as it stood was giving rise to libel tourism (a problem which had led, for example, to the United States passing the SPEECH Act in 2010 to block enforcement of English defamation judgments) and other inappropriate claims.

== Blasphemy law ==
Blasphemy against Christianity was long an important part of British censorship, with the unwritten common law of England containing an offence of blasphemous libel. Prosecutions were, however, rare; the last was the 1977 Gay News legal case Whitehouse v. Lemon, and the last prosecution in Scotland for the Scots common law offence of blasphemy was in 1843. Later developments around the turn of the 21st century, particularly the Human Rights Act 1998 in conjunction with Article 9 and Article 10, put the continued viability of blasphemy prosecutions in doubt. The offence was definitively abolished on 8 May 2008, and the Scottish offence in 2024, but the Northern Ireland offence still stands.

Critics claimed the Racial and Religious Hatred Act 2006 could hinder freedom of speech. Leaders of major religions as well as non-religious groups such as the National Secular Society and English PEN spoke out in order to campaign against the Bill. Comedians and satirists also feared prosecution for their work. However, a late amendment to the Act as a result of these campaigns reads: "Nothing in this Part shall be read or given effect in a way which prohibits or restricts discussion, criticism or expressions of antipathy, dislike, ridicule, insult or abuse of particular religions or the beliefs or practices of their adherents, or of any other belief system or the beliefs or practices of its adherents, or proselytising or urging adherents of a different religion or belief system to cease practising their religion or belief system."

== National security ==
There are several Acts of the United Kingdom Parliament for the protection of official information, mainly related to national security. The latest revision is the Official Secrets Act 1989 (1989 chapter 6), which removed the public interest defence by repealing section 2 of the Official Secrets Act 1911. In 2004 a memo containing details of a possible US bombing of the broadcaster Al Jazeera was leaked to the press. Attorney General Peter Goldsmith warned newspapers that they could be prosecuted under the Official Secrets Act if they publish the contents of the memo, saying "You are reminded that to publish the contents of a document which is known to have been unlawfully disclosed by a crown servant is in itself a breach of section 5 of the Official Secrets Act 1989".

The Terrorism Act 2000 makes it an offence to collect or possess, and as amended in 2019 also to access, information likely to be of use to a terrorist. Bilal Zaheer Ahmad, 23, from Wolverhampton, is believed to be the first person convicted of collecting information likely to be of use to a terrorist, including the al-Qaeda publication Inspire. Since then, Ben Raymond of the group National Action has also been convicted, among other charges, of possession of terrorist information, including Anders Breivik's manifesto and a guide to homemade detonators.

The Terrorism Act 2006 makes it an offence to "glorify" terrorism. There are concerns that this could limit free speech.

DSMA-Notices (Defence and Security Media Advisory Notice, formerly a DA-Notice) are official but voluntary requests to news editors not to publish items on specified subjects, for reasons of national security.

== Prior restraint ==
Beyond obscenity law, there have been a number of organisations whose main function was to approve material prior to distribution.

Plays and theatres had long been licensed by the Crown prior to 1737. Licensure of a playhouse, however, only gave a general patent. The crown had no ability to censor before plays were performed. Under the provisions of the Theatrical Licensing Act 1737 as extended by the Theatres Act 1843, the Lord Chamberlain's Office was able to censor plays. This role continued until the Theatres Act 1968 abolished the practice following several causes célèbres, and a long campaign by the theatre critic Kenneth Tynan among others.

The British Board of Film Classification (BBFC) is the de facto film censor for films in the United Kingdom; since films not rated by the BBFC cannot be shown in most cinemas, or distributed as videos or DVDs, lack of BBFC approval generally makes productions of such films uneconomic.

- In the case of films shown in cinemas, local authorities have the final legal say about who can watch a particular film. Local authorities almost always accept the Board's recommendation for a certificate for a film.
- Under the Video Recording Act 1984, almost all video recordings must be classified by an authority chosen by the Home Secretary. This classification is then legally binding. Since the introduction of the Act, the BBFC has been the chosen authority. Certain works such as those that are related to sport, religion or which are designed to educate can be exempt from classification by the BBFC under the act.
- The BBFC was also responsible for classifying non-exempt video games until 2012, when the Digital Economy Act 2010 passed responsibility to the Video Standards Council, renamed the Games Rating Authority in 2024.

Up until 2007, the Broadcast Advertising Clearance Centre (BACC) pre-approved most British television advertising (under Ofcom rules, other broadcasters can also approve their own advertising content, but most rely on the BACC). The Advertising Standards Authority is the regulatory advertising body, but can only prevent the republication of advertisements after upholding complaints from the general public.

The advent of the Internet access has made the act of censorship more difficult, and there has been a relaxation of censorship in recognition of this. BBFC guidelines have been relaxed further to allow the limited distribution of hardcore pornography under an R18 certificate, partially because of this, and partially because of a recognition that public attitudes have changed. Further confirmation of this change in attitude was provided by the French film Baise-moi, which was given an 18 certificate despite showing scenes of unsimulated sexual activity.

Ofcom is now the regulatory body for UK television, radio, and telecommunications services since the abolition of the Independent Television Commission. Ofcom exerts its powers under the Communications Act 2003. The government's new requirements for Ofcom only require it to ensure adherence to "generally accepted standards" and prevention of harm, removing the former requirement to adhere to standards of "taste and decency".

Worldwide Press Freedom Index, published by Reporters Without Borders, gave the United Kingdom a score of 5.17, making it 24th.

== Self-regulation of publication ==
A number of industries carry out what is known as self-regulation. Self-regulation seeks to keep content within the bounds of what is publicly acceptable, thus preventing government intervention to bring about official regulation. Some of the areas they are concerned about include obscenity, slander and libel. There is no clear line between self-regulation in matters of expression and self-censorship.

In 2019 the intelligence researcher James Flynn reported an example of self-regulation resulting in the cancelled publication of a book about censorship itself. Flynn's book In Defence of Free Speech was originally accepted by Emerald Insight but later rejected over concerns that there was a "significant possibility of legal action" under the UK's hate speech and libel laws. Douglas Murray criticised this decision and compared it to the 2006 controversy that prevented Alms for Jihad from being published in the United Kingdom.

Industry self-regulatory bodies include the Advertising Standards Authority. In the wake of the Leveson Inquiry the Press Complaints Commission (PCC), which had been the main industry regulator of the press in the United Kingdom since 1990, was wound up and most national newspapers now belong to the Independent Press Standards Organisation, established in 2014, refusing to sign up to Impress, the Leveson-compliant alternative.

== Parliamentary footage ==
Proceedings of the House of Lords, House of Commons, and various Parliamentary Committees are broadcast on BBC Parliament and Parliament's Web site. The Rules of Coverage released by the House of Commons Broadcasting Committee place severe limitations on the use of this footage, including a prohibition of its use in the context of political satire. For this reason, rebroadcasts of foreign comedy shows containing Parliamentary footage are restricted from broadcast in the UK, or the footage removed or replaced, often to comic effect.

== Gag orders ==
A gag order, or anonymity order, is sometimes issued by courts in the United Kingdom to protect privacy, prevent harm to suspects, prisoners, witnesses, victims, or to protect national security. In the Allan Chappelow murder case, the trial was held mostly in camera and media were prevented from speculating on the case. The order was imposed after a "compelling case" made by prosecutors, despite overwhelming media opposition brought by a legal challenge to the ruling. This criminal case has been thought to be the first in which a gagging order was imposed.

In 2011 super-injunctions in English law, gagging orders that applied to themselves, were being referred to almost daily in the United Kingdom after a number of high-profile public figures, including celebrities and politicians, censored the British media from revealing information about their personal lives, such as affairs and dealings with prostitutes.

Gag orders protecting the privacy of convicted child murderers such as Mary Bell, Jon Venables and David McGreavy, in order to protect them from revenge attacks, have also been controversial because of public concerns about the inability to avoid such persons and protect victims' families and other children from being harmed by them.

== Censorship by medium ==
=== Art ===
Art was often used as propaganda in Europe, often to point out political scandals but also to spread patriotism in times of need. More specifically, caricature was often used to satirise these events and people and bring attention to the artists' perspectives. Although censorship laws changed based on the stability of the monarchy and their opinions of the citizens, Britain was one of the European countries with the least amount of censorship in this area. During the French Revolution, Britain was in fact the only country where such propaganda was free and legal. The most famous British caricaturists at the time included Isaac Cruikshank, James Gillray, and Thomas Rowlandson. Although all three caricaturists had different perspectives and opinions, they were the frontrunners in the push towards patriotism of the United Kingdom when the UK faced attack from Napoleon.

=== Film ===
After the passage of the Cinematograph Act 1909, which required local authorities to inspect and license cinemas for fire safety reasons, some local councils began to use licensing as a way to enforce film censorship. Consequently, the British Board of Film Censors, known today as the British Board of Film Classification (BBFC) was founded to standardise film regulation.

=== Internet ===
Although freedom of expression and protection of privacy over the Internet is guaranteed by UK law, since about 2010 there has been an increasing shift towards authoritarian measures such as increased surveillance (The United Kingdom has more police surveillance cameras than anywhere else outside China) and police action. Combating terrorism, preventing child abuse, and cracking down on "hate speech" have been widely used by state agencies and private commercial actors (e.g. Internet service providers) to justify the implementation of interception and direct filtering measures. Nevertheless, in 2010 the OpenNet Initiative (ONI) found no evidence of technical filtering in the political, social, conflict/security, or Internet tools areas. The UK openly blocks child pornography websites, for which ONI does not test.

98.6% of UK internet traffic consume a service called the child abuse image content list which uses data provided by the Internet Watch Foundation to identify pages judged to contain indecent photographs of children. When such a page is found, the system creates a "URL not found page" error rather than deliver the actual page or a warning page.

In July and again in October 2011, the High Court ruled that BT Retail must block access to a website (newzbin.com) which "provides links to pirated movies". In September 2011, in response to the court ruling and with encouragement from government, leading UK ISPs are reported to have privately agreed in principle to quickly restrict access to websites when presented with court orders. In May 2012 the High Court ordered UK ISPs to block The Pirate Bay to prevent further copyright infringing movie and music downloads facilitated by the website. Soon after, the High Court ordered UK ISPs to block other websites linking to, or endorsing online "piracy", such as KickAss Torrents (kat.ph).

Since the end of 2013 a rolling programme has been in place to ensure that most households in the UK have pornography and other material (such as suicide, alcohol and violence-related content) filtered from the Internet by default unless a household chooses to receive it. This follows an announcement by Prime Minister David Cameron on 22 July 2013.

In addition to Internet filtering, the UK also prosecutes those who are alleged to be violating hate speech laws online. In particular, the Communications Act 2003 outlaws the act of sending "by means of a public electronic communications network a message or other matter that is grossly offensive or of an indecent, obscene or menacing character". In 2017 Alison Saunders, the Director of Public Prosecutions, announced the allocation of additional resources for enforcing it and the intent to treat online speech as equivalent to a conversation in person. In 2018 the Sentencing Council began deliberating on whether to increase the maximum sentence for suspects with many social media followers. Digital secretary Margot James also outlined a plan to increase government regulation of social networks with possible penalties including 4% of the firm's global turnover. Culture secretary Matt Hancock elaborated on this plan and likened it to the controversial German law NetzDG. After the refusal by ten technology companies to send representatives to a meeting he held, he stated that this gave him "a big impetus to drive these proposals to legislate through".

As of 2017, it was estimated that nine people per day were being arrested for online speech within the UK, with five leading to convictions. In February 2021 a Scottish man from Lanark was arrested and subsequently convicted for an "offensive tweet" insulting the recently deceased Second World War veteran Sir Thomas Moore, which read: "The only good Brit soldier is a deed one, burn auld fella buuuuurn". In September 2024 the American billionaire businessman Elon Musk wrote: "I don't think anyone should go to the UK when they're releasing convicted pedophiles in order to imprison people for social media posts", after apparently being "shunned" from a UK summit that year. In November 2024 the former prime minister Boris Johnson wrote on Twitter, in regard to a journalist being visited by police for a tweet: "This is appalling. How can Starmer's Britain lecture other countries about free speech when an innocent journalist gets a knock on the door – for a tweet? Our police have their hands full of burglaries and violent crime. They are being forced to behave like a woke Securitate – and it has to stop." In 2024 a man from Carlisle was imprisoned after posting three images on Facebook which included men of South Asian appearance, one of which showed the men wielding knives, with the captions "Coming to a town near you" and "When it's on your turf, then what?". In another incident reported on in 2024 a black woman from London was charged with using racial slurs on Twitter in 2023, writing: "I’m so p***** off let me get my hands on that f**** n***a". The charges were later dropped.

In 2023, 12,183 people were arrested for speech-related offenses in England and Wales. Critics have noted that this is significantly higher than Russia's 882 speech-related offense arrests in the same year.

==== Age verification ====
Beginning in March 2019, the Digital Economy Act 2017 gave the government power to require certain websites to implement an age verification scheme under rules defined in the Online Pornography (Commercial Basis) Regulations 2019. After a series of setbacks, the planned scheme was eventually abandoned in 2019.

Following the implementation of the Online Safety Act 2023 on 25 July 2025, Ofcom required age verification system for accessing pornographic sites, as well as digital platforms like X (formerly Twitter), Reddit, Bluesky, Discord, Grindr and Spotify.

==== "Think before you post" ====
On 8 August 2024, after the 2024 United Kingdom riots the UK government official account on X (Twitter) quoted "Think before you post" the Crown Prosecution Service announcement of the criminalisation of social media contents that are so called "inciting criminal behaviour".

=== Literature ===
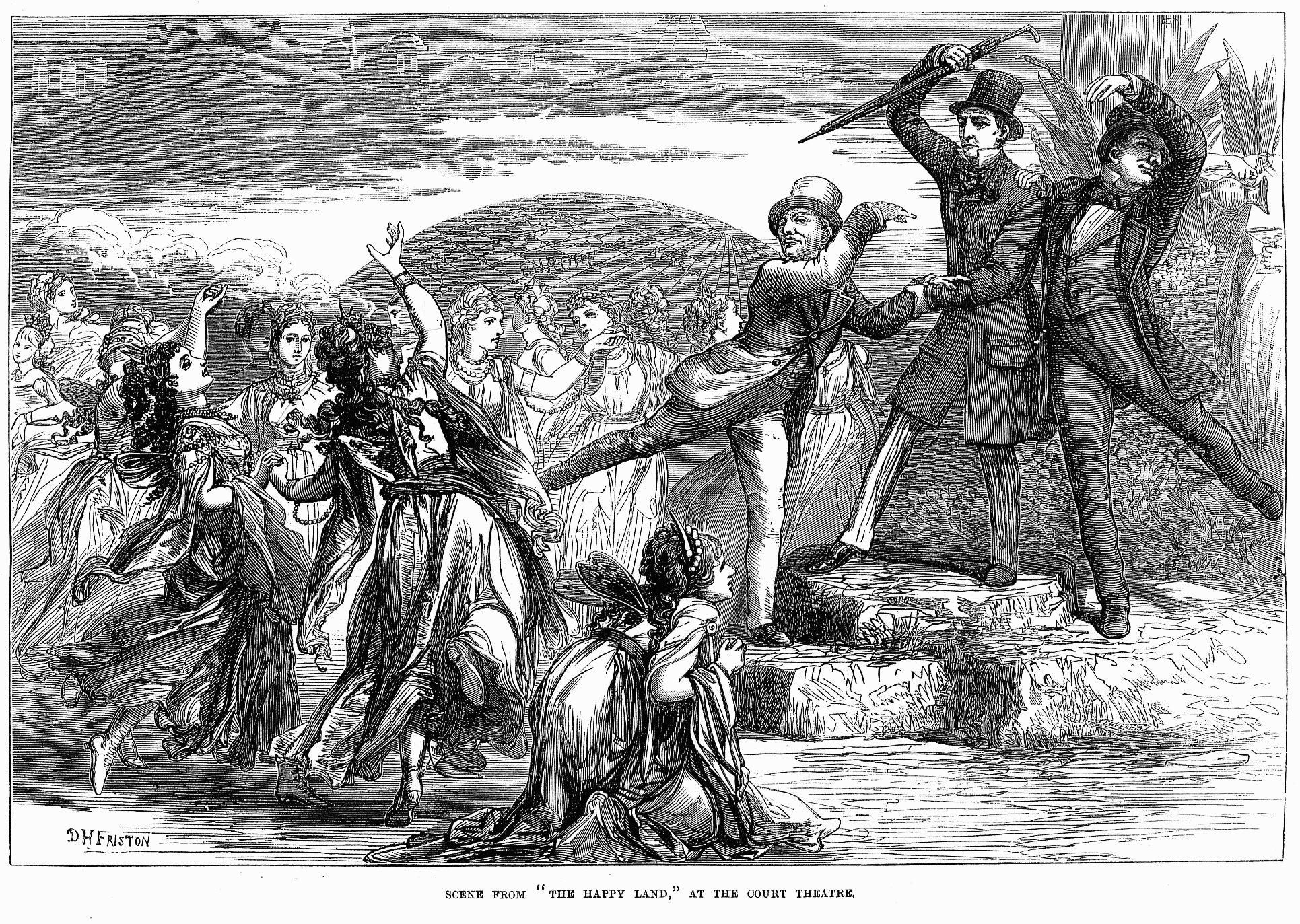
The Happy Land, before censorship, showing the singing, dancing members of Gladstone's government. Illustration by D. H. Friston for The Illustrated London News of 22 March 1873.

In 1873 controversy over the depiction of William Ewart Gladstone, Robert Lowe, 1st Viscount Sherbrooke, and Acton Smee Ayrton in W. S. Gilbert and Gilbert Arthur à Beckett's The Happy Land led to the play's licence being revoked by the Lord Chamberlain. A censored version of the play was eventually allowed to be performed, but uncensored scripts, with the censored portions printed in all capital letters, were printed by the theatre's manager. The play became a smash hit.

The novel Ulysses by James Joyce was banned in the United Kingdom in 1922 when it was declared obscene.

The novelist George Orwell wrote several articles on censorship including an item titled The Freedom of the Press in 1943. It appears that this was a preface for his book Animal Farm, but it is unclear if it had been deliberately suppressed or if Orwell himself chose not to publish it.

Any fair-minded person with journalistic experience will admit that during this war official censorship has not been particularly irksome. We have not been subjected to the kind of totalitarian 'co-ordination' that it might have been reasonable to expect. The press has some justified grievances, but on the whole the Government has behaved well and has been surprisingly tolerant of minority opinions. The sinister fact about literary censorship in England is that it is largely voluntary. – George Orwell

Orwell went on to suggest that because both the UK and the Soviet Union were members of the Allied powers at the time, this self-censorship was preventing valid criticism of the Communist regime. Orwell worked for the Ministry of Information during the war and used it as his inspiration for the Ministry of Truth in Nineteen Eighty-Four.

=== Radio ===
Censorship of music on the airwaves was in effect the power of the BBC. Some songs were banned for containing sexually explicit lyrics, or promoting the use of drugs. Some songs were banned for political reasons such as Paul McCartney and Wings song "Give Ireland Back to the Irish" in the 1970s, or in the 1980s Christy Moore's "Back Home in Derry" since it was written by Bobby Sands.

In 1949 the "BBC Variety Programmes Policy Guide For Writers and Producers" (commonly known as "the Green Book") was issued by the BBC to its producers and writers of comedy. Among things absolutely banned were jokes about lavatories, effeminacy in men, immorality of any kind, suggestive references to honeymoon couples, chambermaids, fig leaves, ladies' underwear (e.g. "winter draws on"), prostitution, and the vulgar use of words such as "basket". The guidelines also stipulated that "such words as God, Good God, My God, Blast, Hell, Damn, Bloody, Gorblimey, Ruddy, etc etc should be deleted from scripts and innocuous expressions substituted."

In April 2013, after the death of Margaret Thatcher, the song "Ding-Dong! The Witch Is Dead" from the 1939 film The Wizard of Oz rose to number two in the BBC Radio 1 UK singles chart as many people bought the song to celebrate her death. The BBC refused to air the full song, however, with only a small clip being played on the hit chart show.

In 2025, historian Rutger Bregman's intended statement in his 2025 Reith Lecture that Donald Trump was the "most openly corrupt president in American history" was censored by the BBC upon advice of its lawyers prior to the broadcast. The BBC forbid its staff from quoting the censored line in communication with the media.

=== Television ===
During the Troubles in Northern Ireland the BBC, ITV and Channel 4 regularly stopped or postponed the broadcast of documentaries relating to Ireland. A Real Lives documentary for the BBC, At the Edge of the Union, was temporarily blocked in August 1985 by direct government intervention from the then Home Secretary Leon Brittan. This led to a one-day strike by the National Union of Journalists to defend the independence of the BBC.

From November 1988 to September 1994, the voices of Irish republicans and Loyalist paramilitaries were barred by the British government from British television and radio. This necessitated the use by broadcasters of an actor 'revoicing' the words which had been spoken by interviewees or at public meetings by the affected groups. The case of After Dark – "the most uncensorable programme in the history of British television" – is also relevant, specifically the unmade edition of the programme in 1988 with Gerry Adams. The ban was lifted a fortnight after the first Provisional Irish Republican Army ceasefire, on 16 September 1994. The ban could not be enforced for the duration of election campaigns.

An international academic conference on censorship noted other "After Dark case histories which bear on issues of censorship include the intelligence services, drugs, freemasonry, sex ... and Oliver Reed."

The 1986 documentary Greece: The Hidden War, that investigated the involvement of British forces in the Dekemvriana events and the Greek Civil War, was banned from being reshown.

=== Video games ===
The introduction of controversial video games featuring photo-realistic images, such as Mortal Kombat and Night Trap, led to calls from the tabloid press for games to fall under the Video Recordings Act. The UK games publisher trade body ELSPA responded by introducing a voluntary age rating system in 1994. The ELSPA ratings were succeeded by PEGI in 2003.

Nevertheless, although games are generally exempt from the Video Recordings Act, those depicting sexual content, or gross violence towards people or animals, must still be submitted to the BBFC for consideration. BBFC ratings are legally binding, and British law imposes stiff penalties on retailers who sell to under-aged customers. However, the Act was discovered in August 2009 to be unenforceable. The rating system is to be reviewed as part of the Digital Britain project.

Carmageddon, in which the gameplay involved mowing down innocent pedestrians, was the first game to be refused classification in 1997, effectively banning it from sale. The game's publisher, SCI, had a modified version created in which the pedestrians in question were replaced by green-blooded zombies, which completed a successful appeal against the BBFC to overturn their original decision. The uncensored, unmodified version of Carmageddon was later released under an 18-certificate.

In 2002 the IO Interactive game Hitman 2: Silent Assassin was withdrawn by a number of retailers due to religious sensitivities. The area in question involved a Sikh sect that were depicted as terrorists involved in arms smuggling and assassination. It also involved a section that many Sikhs believed to closely resemble the 1984 massacre at the Amritsar temple.

In 2004 the parents of a murdered 14-year-old boy blamed Manhunt as having been "connected" to the murder. It was later found not to be, as the game was found in the victim's home, rather than the killer's. Leicestershire police "did not uncover any connections to the computer game". The accusations prompted some retailers to remove the game from their shelves. Nevertheless, following this incident the sales of the game rose due to the free publicity from newspaper headlines. The sequel, Manhunt 2, released in 2007, was banned from being sold in the UK by the BBFC. On appeal to the Video Appeals Committee this ruling was overturned however the BBFC launched a successful judicial review into the VAC's decision, forcing the VAC to reconsider its judgment. On 14 March 2008 the VAC again recommended that the game be released, a position to which the BBFC agreed. The game is now available.

== See also ==
- Sub judice
- 1988–1994 British broadcasting voice restrictions
- Anne Dodd, imprisoned in 1728 for selling anti-ministry pamphlets
- British Board of Film Classification
- Campaign Against Censorship
- Child pornography laws in the United Kingdom
- Committee on Obscenity and Film Censorship
- Feminists Against Censorship
- Freedom of the press
- Hate speech laws in the United Kingdom
- Index on Censorship
- International Freedom of Expression Exchange
- Libel tourism
- Mary Whitehouse, a Christian morality campaigner (founder of the National Viewers' and Listeners' Association) known for her opposition to social liberalism
- Mass surveillance in the United Kingdom
- Master of the Revels
- Mediawatch-UK (formerly the National Viewers and Listeners' Association)
- John Milton, English poet and intellectual who has been regarded among history's most influential and impassioned defenders of freedom of speech and freedom of the press
- Open Rights Group
- Public spaces protection order
- Police, Crime, Sentencing and Courts Act 2022
- Society for Individual Freedom
- Taking Liberties (film)
- Thomas Bowdler whose name is now used as the verb "bowdlerise" or "bowdlerize"
- Areopagitica: A speech of Mr John Milton for the liberty of unlicensed printing to the Parliament of England
