= Alms for Jihad =

2006 book by J. Millard Burr and Robert O. Collins

Alms for Jihad: Charity and Terrorism in the Islamic World
- Cover of the first edition of Alms for Jihad
- Author: J. Millard Burr and Robert O. Collins
- Language: English
- Genre: Current affairs
- Publisher: Cambridge University Press
- Publication date: April 2006
- Publication place: United States
- Pages: 368
- ISBN: 978-0-521-85730-7
- OCLC: 94948942
- Dewey Decimal: 361.7/5/091767 22
- LC Class: HV435 .B87 2006

Alms for Jihad: Charity and Terrorism in the Islamic World is a 2006 book co-written by American authors J. Millard Burr, a former USAID relief coordinator in Sudan, and historian Robert O. Collins which discusses the role of Islamic charities in financing terrorism.

== Controversy ==
In August 2007, the UK publisher Cambridge University Press ("CUP"), attempted to have the work removed from circulation due to libel action against them under the English legal system by Saudi businessman Khalid Salim A. Bin Mahfouz because the book accused him of funding al-Qaeda.

Kevin Taylor, intellectual property director at Cambridge University Press, stated that the book cited sources "whose falsity had been established to the satisfaction of the English courts" and "the evidence produced by the authors of Alms for Jihad, repeated from earlier sources, has not stood up to the requisite tests."

However, the authors of the book opposed CUP's action; instead, they urged Cambridge to contest the lawsuit. CUP was criticized by some who claimed that its action was incompatible with US freedom of speech laws and with freedom of the press, and also claimed English libel laws were excessively strict. In The New York Times Book Review (7 October 2007), United States Congressman Frank R. Wolf described CUP's settlement as "basically a book burning".

=== Effect on sales ===
Within hours, Alms for Jihad became one of the hundred most popular titles on Amazon.com and eBay in the United States. CUP wrote to libraries asking them to remove copies from circulation. CUP subsequently sent out copies of an errata sheet. The American Library Association issued a recommendation to libraries still holding Alms for Jihad: "Given the intense interest in the book, and the desire of readers to learn about the controversy first hand, we recommend that U.S. libraries keep the book available for their users."

== Media reports ==
Nathan Vardi published an article in Forbes magazine titled "Sins of the Father?" on March 18, 2002, with the heading: "Khalid bin Mahfouz, a Saudi billionaire, spent the 1990s engaged in financial folly and funding what the U.S. government calls a front for Al-Qaeda. Now a new generation tries to escape the shadow."

== Subsequently ==
The case led to the passing of the Libel Terrorism Protection Act (also known as "Rachel's Law") by the state of New York on April 29, 2008.

== Previous cases ==
Mahfouz had previously also sued over claims in four other books:

- June 2006: La Vérité Interdite (The Forbidden Truth) by Jean-Charles Brisard and Guillaume Dasquié
- April 2006: Funding Evil: How Terrorism is Financed and How to Stop It, by Rachel Ehrenfeld
- July 2004: Terrorism financing: roots and trends of Saudi terrorism financing, prepared by JCB Consulting

== See also ==
- List of charities accused of ties to terrorism

== References and sources ==
=== Sources ===
- Burr, J. Millard; Collins, Robert O. (2006). Alms for Jihad: Charity and Terrorism in the Islamic World. Cambridge University Press. ISBN 0-521-85730-9.
