= Robert O. Collins =

American historian

- Born: Robert Oakley Collins; April 1, 1933; Waukegan, Illinois
- Died: April 11, 2008 (aged 75); Santa Barbara, California
- Occupation: Historian

Robert Oakley Collins (April 1, 1933 – April 11, 2008) was an American historian of East Africa and Sudan. He published numerous articles and thirty-five books, including Shadows in the Grass: Britain in the Southern Sudan (Yale, 1983), which was awarded the John Ben Snow Foundation prize for the best book in British History and the Social Sciences written by a North American. He worked as an adviser for Southern Sudan's High Executive Council (HEC) Regional Government in the early 1970s, Chevron Overseas Petroleum in 1981 to 1991, (Note: Collins was not altogether uncritical of Chevron's activities in southern Sudan. However, as Douglas Johnson somewhat wryly notes of J. Millard Burr and Robert O Collins' Requiem for the Sudan: War, Drought, and Disaster Relief on the Nile (1995), the book "makes no mention of the oil controversy as a contributory cause to the war. Chevron's contribution to famine relief is mentioned (pp.129-30), but not its support to local militias who helped cause famine. This admission is all the more surprising, considering that one of the authors was an adviser to Chevron for much of the 1980s and early 1990s." Johnson, Douglas H. (2011). The Root Causes of Sudan's Civil Wars: Peace Or Truce. Boydell & Brewer. p. 46. ISBN 978-1847010292. For a discussion of Chevron's support for militias and other human rights violations in Sudan, see Rone, Jemera (2003). Sudan, Oil, and Human Rights. Human Rights Watch. pp. 143–144.) and the US Government. Collins authored many background papers on Sudan and the Middle East aimed at policymakers and, in 1981, he testified before the United States House Committee on Foreign Affairs. (Note: For example, he authored a policy paper titled The United States and the Sudan: a policy proposal, which was subsequently issued by the Center for Racial Equality and Democratic Opportunity (CREDO), an organization founded to "train black South Africans for diplomatic career[s] and to contribute to [the] development of local and regional governmental structures." See Ann McKinstry Micou (1993). The U.S. Independent Sector as it relates to South African Initiatives: A Directory (PDF) (Report). Institute of International Education. Archived from the original (PDF) on 7 February 2017. And see "Robert Oakley Collins". reed.dur.ac.uk. Durham University Library Special Collections Catalogue. 1997. Archived from the original on 18 May 2025.) In 1980 he was awarded the Order of Sciences, Arts and Art, Gold Class, by Gaafar Nimeiry, the President of Sudan, for his long service to scholarship on the Upper Nile.

Robert O. Collins was Professor of History at the University of California, Santa Barbara, from 1965 to 1994. Among a wider public, he is probably best known for a book co-authored with J. Millard Burr, Alms for Jihad: Charity and Terrorism in the Islamic World (CUP, 2006). In 2007, to avoid a libel suit from the Saudi billionaire Khalid bin Mahfouz, Cambridge University Press agreed to remove Alms for Jihad from circulation in British libraries and to destroy existing copies.

== Biography ==
=== Early life and education ===
Robert O. Collins was born in Waukegan, Illinois, in 1933. His father, William George Collins, was a ceramics engineer and worked for Johns Manville. His mother, Louise Van Horsen Jack, was a nurse. Robert's elder brother, Jack Gore Collins (1930–2010), was Assistant Attorney for the United States Department of Justice in Portland, Oregon. His younger brother, George William Collins II (1937–2013), was an astronomer who taught at Ohio State University and, later, Case Western Reserve University.

Robert entered Dartmouth College in 1950, where he developed an interest in African history while browsing in the library there. In 1954, he completed his senior history thesis, Emin Pasha in Equatoria, 1876–1889, and won a Marshall Scholarship for study at Oxford University. In 1955, while a Masters student at Balliol College, Oxford, he obtained a research grant from the Ford Foundation, which enabled him to undertake work on his thesis on the Equatoria Province. He first traveled to Sudan in 1956, arriving a few months after the county's independence, to carry out research in the National Records Office of Sudan. He obtained an MA in History at Oxford University during that year, and entered Yale in 1957. Collins was awarded a PhD in 1959. His dissertation, The Mahdist invasions of the Southern Sudan, 1883–1898 (1959) was based on his MA research and published "virtually unrevised" as The Southern Sudan, 1883–1898. A struggle for control by Yale University Press in 1962.

=== Academic career ===
After intervals at Williams College (1959–1965) and Columbia University (1962–1963), Collins moved to the University of California, Santa Barbara where he worked for the remainder of his career as a Professor of History (1965–1994). His colleagues there included C. Warren Hollister, Wilbur Jacobs, and Roderick Nash. He also served as Dean of UCSB's Graduate Division (1970–1980), the Director of the Center for Developing Nations (1968–1969), and the Director of the University of California's Washington Center in Washington, DC. (1992–1994). In 1972, Collins chaired the University of California Library Task Force and wrote the committee's report, which led to the establishment of the Division of Library Automation and the Melvyl system. He retired from the University of California Santa Barbara in 1994. He continued to teach, write, and mentor students after his retirement. Collins collected documents, pamphlets, photographs, books, and other materials related to Sudan and East Africa; and, in 1997, he donated his substantial library and primary research materials to Durham University's Sudan Archive. Collin donated his diary relating to his work as a professor and university administrator to the library at the University of California, Santa Barbara. It describes the Isla Vista riots that followed the denial of tenure to Bill Allen, a popular Professor of Anthropology. (Note: For an account of the Isla Vista riots, see Preston, Ben (13 August 2008). "Year of Rebellion: The 1970 Isla Vista Riots, Photography by Joe Melchione". Santa Barbara Independent. Santa Barbara, California. Archived from the original on 11 July 2017.)

=== Southern Sudan historical retrieval project ===
Collins made an important contribution to the National Archives of South Sudan by providing an early inventory of district files and filing systems. Following the Addis Ababa Agreement (1972), Enoch Mading de Garang, the Regional Minister of Information, Culture, Youth and Sports in Southern Sudan's High Executive Council (HEC) government, began work on an archive of Southern Sudanese political movements. In 1976, Robert Collins traveled with his wife, Janyce, to southern Sudan, after being invited there by E.M. Garang to compile a report on ways to collect and preserve materials related to Southern Sudan's recent history as part of the Southern Sudan Historical Retrieval Project. Collins consulted scholars and officials, visited the proposed sites for the University of Juba and parliament buildings in Juba, and made an inspection of files in Juba, Yei, Maridi, Rumbek, Gogrial, Aweil, Tonj, Yirol, Wau, and Malakal. Robert and Janyce were forced to remain several weeks in Malakal by an outbreak of Ebola haemorrhagic fever in the Nzara cotton factory, which spread to other parts of southern Sudan. Upon his return to Juba, Collins recommended that E.M. Garang expand the archives to include Southern Sudan's administrative records.

=== Alms for Jihad controversy ===
Collins co-authored Alms for Jihad: Charity and Terrorism in the Islamic World (Cambridge University Press (CUP), 2006) with J. Millard Burr, a former State Department Officer who worked as a logistics coordinator for Operation Lifeline Sudan and, later, as a consultant for the U.S. Committee for Refugees (USCR). In 2007, to avoid a libel suit from the Saudi billionaire Khalid bin Mahfouz, Cambridge University Press agreed to remove Alms for Jihad from circulation in British libraries and to destroy existing copies. Khalid bin Mahfouz had threatened the suit on the grounds that the book falsely charged him with channeling money to al-Qaeda. Cambridge University Press sent letters to libraries around the world requesting that they destroy copies of the book or insert an errata sheet, pulped 2,340 copies of Alms for Jihad, issued a public apology to bin Mahfouz on its web site stating that claims against Mahfouz were "defamatory and false", and paid costs and damages. The actions of CUP attracted wide attention, contributing to the book's wide readership.

Many scholars have criticized the book for relying on tenuous evidence and an overly-broad and deeply political definition of "terrorism", which portrayed the entire Islamic charitable sector as a conduit or "golden chain" for terrorist financing.

== Reception ==
Robert O. Collins work has been influential in the study of Sudanese and Middle East history. He was an immensely talented writer, raconteur, and a well-respected figure in the historiography of Sudan and southern Sudan. Contemporary scholars, who have turned their attention to South Sudan's interconnected regional histories, ordinary people, and the political-economic structures within which their lives unfold, often place Collins in the tradition of slightly older historians and authors like A.J. Arkell (1898–1980), Peter Holt (1918–2006) and Alan Moorehead (1910–1983), partly to imply that his approach to history is now a bit old-fashioned.

In [Egypt and the Sudan (1967)] and the countless others on Sudanese history, great men (though few women) determined the outcome of events, almost always as they wanted, usually in the face of daunting odds. Bob was no leftist historian, nor was he an individual steeped in Marxist theories and rhetoric. He luxuriated in the narrative and was remarkably good at it.

Collins worked closely with former British colonial officials and civil servants, and was "unabashed in his enthusiasm for the contributions that the British had made to the lives of colonial people." Describing the misconduct of Chevron's British contractors toward southern Sudanese, he wrote, nostalgically: "These are not the Gentlemen from Oxbridge with whom we associate the British."

== Private life ==
Robert ("Bob") Collins owned a yellow Beetle. In 1972, he married Janyce Hutchins (1934–2005), a university administrator and "gifted astrologer." They traveled frequently together in Africa, the Middle East, and Europe.

== Bibliography ==
Collins wrote 35 books, numerous encyclopedia entries, and more than one hundred scholarly articles and book chapters. He also frequently collaborated with other authors, most notably Francis Deng and J. Millard Burr.

=== Books ===
- — (2008). A History of the Modern Sudan. Cambridge: Cambridge University Press.
- — (2007). A History of Sub-Saharan Africa. Cambridge: Cambridge University Press.
- — (2006). Darfur: The Long Road to Disaster. Markus Wiener.
- — (2005). Africa: A Short History. Markus Wiener.
- — (2005). Civil Wars and Revolution in the Sudan: Essays on the Sudan, Southern Sudan, and Darfur, 1962-2004. Tsehai Publishers.
- — (2002). The Nile. New Haven: Yale University Press. ISBN 9780300097641.
- — (1999). Africa's Thirty Years' War: Chad, Libya, and the Sudan, 1963-1993. Westview.
- — (1996). Problems in Modern Africa. Marcus Wiener.
- — (1990). The Waters of the Nile: Hydropolitics and the Jonglei Canal, 1900-1988. Clarendon.
- — (1983). Shadows in the Grass: Britain in the Southern Sudan, 1918-1956. Yale University Press. ISBN 9780300029222.
- — (1971). Land Beyond the Rivers: The Southern Sudan, 1898-1918. Yale University Press. ISBN 9780300014068.
- — (1968). King Leopold, England, and the Upper Nile, 1899-1909. Yale University Press.
- — (1962). The Southern Sudan 1883-1898: A Struggle for Control. Yale University Press.

=== Co-authored and co-edited books ===
- — with Burr, Millard (2006). Alms for Jihad: Charities and Terrorism in the Islamic World. Cambridge: Cambridge University.
- — with Burr, Millard (2003). Revolutionary Sudan: Hasan al-Turabi and the Islamist State, 1989-2000. Leiden: Brill Academic Publishers.
- — with Burr, Millard (1999). Africa's Thirty Years War: Chad, Libya, and the Sudan, 1963-1993. Westview.
- — with Burr, Millard (1994). Requiem for the Sudan: War, Drought and Disaster Relief, 1983-1993. Westview. ISBN 9780183321215.
- — with Deng, Francis M. (1984). The British in the Sudan, 1898— 1956: The Sweetness and the Sorrow. Palgrave Macmillan UK.
- — with Tignor, Robert L. (1967). Egypt and the Sudan. Prentice-Hall.
