= Donald Marquand Dozer =

American scholar (1905–1980)

Donald Marquand Dozer (June 7, 1905 - August 4, 1980) was an American scholar of Latin American history.

Dozer was born in Zanesville, Ohio, receiving his A.B. in History from the College of Wooster in 1927, and then earned an A.M. (1930) and a Ph.D. (1936) in History at Harvard University. His doctoral dissertation was entitled “Anti-imperialism in the United States 1865-1895. Opposition to the annexation of overseas territories.”

He taught at the University of Maryland from 1937 to 1942, and then, from 1942 to 1943, he served with the Office of the Coordinator of Information (which later evolved into the Office of Strategic Services and the Office of War Information) in Washington, DC. From 1943 to 1944, Dozer was a liaison in the Caribbean region for the Office of Lend Lease Administration. He moved to the State Department, where he did research and analysis (especially on Argentina) until 1956. He then accepted a call to the History Department of the University of California, Santa Barbara, where he joined Philip Wayne Powell and Wilbur R. Jacobs in building a nucleus of scholars who would become the core of a growing department in the 1960s. Dozer published approximately 100 articles and reviews as well as several well-received books. He retired and was granted emeritus status in 1972, and died in 1980, aged 75, at Saint Francis Hospital in Santa Barbara.

== Selected publications ==
- Donald Marquand Dozer, Are We Good Neighbors? Three Decades of Inter-American Relations, 1930-1960 (Gainesville: University of Florida Press, 1959)
- Donald Marquand Dozer, Latin America: An Interpretive History (New York: McGraw Hill, 1962), translated into Portuguese in 1966 as America latina (Porto Alegre Globo, 1966)
- Donald Marquand Dozer, ed., The Monroe Doctrine: Its Modern Significance (New York: Knopf, 1967)
- Donald Marquand Dozer, The Challenge to Pan Americanism (Tempe, AZ: Center for Latin American Studies, 1972)
- Donald Marquand Dozer, Portrait of the Free State: A History of Maryland (Cambridge, Maryland: Tidewater Publishers, 1976).
- Donald Marquand Dozer, The Panama Canal in Perspective (Washington, DC: Council on American Affairs, 1978)
