= How to Win Millions Playing Slot Machines...or Lose Trying =

Book with a satirical view of slot machines, written by Frank Legato

- Title page for How to Win Millions Playing Slot Machines...or Lose Trying (2004)
- Author: Frank Legato
- Language: English
- Genre: Non-fiction
- Publisher: Bonus Books
- Publication date: July 2004

How to Win Millions Playing Slot Machines...or Lose Trying is a book with a satirical view of slot machines, written by Frank Legato and published in July, 2004 by Bonus Books. This book is a humorous look at slot machines but it does not mean that the author tries to speak about this game and its players as being unintelligent or unthinking. Frank Legato describes the world of slot machines (history, concept, how to play) in a funny and interesting manner.

== Reception ==
In a positive review, John G. Brokopp of the Quad-City Times wrote, "This is not only an informative book, it's also a witty, light-hearted and very humorous approach by a man who is a gifted writer, if not a comedian. Anyone who plays slots will learn more than they ever knew about the inner workings of the machines, plus they'll be entertained." Southtown Star reviewer Gus Rose lauded the book, stating, "Legato has a special style, at times bordering on complete irreverence. But he covers the ground he has staked out very well, interspersed with asides and off-the-wall comments that make it a fun read." Writing for The Atlantic, Marc Cooper said the author "knocks down every hoary myth about how to win at slots".
