= Trevor Asserson =

British lawyer (born 1956)

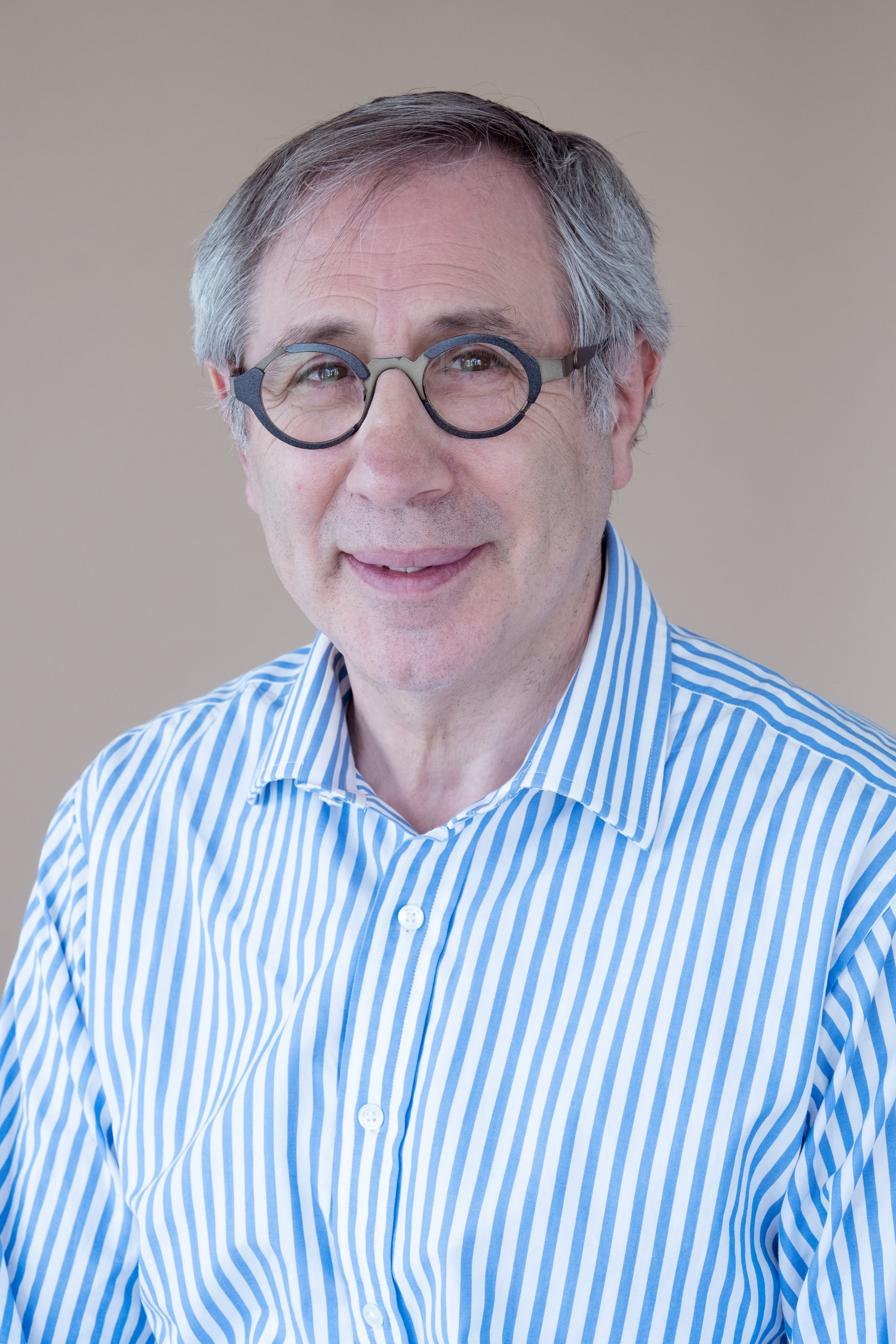
- Born: November 26, 1956 (age 69)
- Occupation: lawyer

Trevor Asserson (born 26 November 1956) is a British lawyer specialising in litigation. He is the founder and Senior Partner at Asserson Law Offices.

A member of the Law Society, Asserson is active as a lawyer within the Jewish Community in the UK and Israel. He is based in Jerusalem, Israel.

== Early life and education ==
Trevor Asserson was born in London to a Jewish family. His father was a businessman, and his mother was a writer and a broadcaster. Asserson was educated at Stowe School, Buckingham, and University College School, London. He was awarded an open scholarship to Queen's College, Oxford, where he read modern history, graduating in 1979 with a B.A. Whilst at Oxford, he was an editor of the university's Isis Magazine and won his oar in the college eights.

== Legal career ==
Trevor Asserson qualified as a UK solicitor in 1984, going on to work in the litigation department of City Firm Herbert Smith, and later joined Hodge, Jones & Allen, England's largest legal-aid law firm. He set up and led HJ&A's Housing Law department, at the time, the largest in the UK, working principally for the homeless.

Asserson moved to Israel in 1990, where he trained as a lawyer at Israel's premier law firm, Herzog Fox and Ne'eman, being called to the Israeli Bar in 1992.

In 1993, upon returning to the UK, Asserson joined Bird & Bird, where he became the Global Head of International Litigation. His clients included the UK government, other sovereign states, multinational corporations, and high-net-worth individuals.

Asserson launched Asserson Law Offices (ALO) in 2005, providing UK legal services from an offshore location, ALO is now the largest foreign law firm in Israel.

Since the 1990s, Trevor Asserson has been shortlisted as Litigator of the Year and consistently ranked as a leading litigator in international directories. He has been featured as 'Lawyer of the Week' in The Times, Chambers and Partners, and The Law Society Gazette.

== Selected cases ==
Trevor Asserson was the lead lawyer in Don King Productions Inc. v Warren (December 1998), a major dispute between the leading boxing promoters in the US and the UK.

Representing King in this action, Asserson, a senior litigation partner at Morgan Lewis & Bockius, had previously acted for King during the prolonged court proceedings following the collapse of his business arrangement with British promoter Frank Warren, which culminated in a $12 million out-of-court settlement.

In 2004, The New York Times reported that Asserson represented Rachel Ehrenfeld. Ehrenfeld's British distribution deal for her new book, "Funding Evil: How Terrorism Is Financed and How to Stop It", was canceled due to a legal threat from one of the Saudis she mentioned.

In 2012, Asserson represented jailed Israeli solicitor Israel Perry concerning one of the largest cases ever brought by the Serious Organised Crime Agency (SOCA), seeking to seize and gain disclosure of worldwide assets worth hundreds of millions of pounds. Asserson challenged both orders on jurisdiction grounds, referring to the "[very concerning] effect of this novel and far-reaching interpretation of UK law" on people who retain sensitive client information. The matter went to the Supreme Court on two separate issues, where the UK Government was defeated 9–0 and 7–2 respectively. Later, in a remarkable instance of the government utilizing its judicial power, the UK Government passed an amending law in attempt to reverse the Supreme Court result. However, the claim was subsequently abandoned and damages paid to Perry.

Asserson represented the Greek government's interest in Macedonia's largest oil refinery, in the case of Okta Crude Oil Refinery v Mamidoil-Jetoil Greek Petroleum Company, in 2003. The case led to various reported decisions, creating numerous precedents.

In 2009, Asserson successfully defended Sonja Kohn, the main defendant in Madoff Securities International Ltd (MSIL) v Raven & Ors. The Madoff estate sought to recover from Kohn c.$59 billion arising out of introductions to the Madoff Ponzi scheme. The Madoff estate paid legal costs on an indemnity basis.

Asserson represented Adath Yisroel Burial Society (AYBS) in 2018, bringing three separate applications for judicial review against Mary Hassell, Senior Coroner for Inner North London, in what came to be known as the Coroner Case. Hassell acted in a way that was discriminatory against the needs of the Muslim and Jewish communities. The High Court found Hassell's practice to be "unlawful, irrational" and "discriminatory", and its ruling was hailed as a "victory by AYBS is a victory for the cause of diversity throughout British society." Asserson was selected as Lawyer of the week in The Times for this work.

Trevor Asserson was behind the claim that obtained the "largest ever sum recovered by a Human Rights Act claim", representing 18 claimants by launching a successful judicial review and Human Rights Act claim against the Department for Energy and Climate Change for losses stemming from earlier than expected cut in subsidies.

== Public activities ==
In 2000, Asserson founded BBCWatch to analyze BBC media coverage of the Middle East. Between 2000 and 2006, BBCWatch published six studies alleging the BBC's systematic bias against Israel. Asserson appeared on public debates, TV, and radio, stating that the "BBC's coverage of the Middle East is infected by a widespread antipathy toward the country". BBC held a public inquiry into its Middle East coverage and created a senior editorial post to advise on its Middle East coverage.

In 2008, Asserson released a report alleging that the BBC Arabic radio exhibited bias during the 2006 Second Lebanon War, favoring Iran and Hezbollah. Asserson also acted for the Campaign Against Antisemitism (CAA) in its claim against Bristol University after David Miller's conduct left Jewish students feeling "unsafe and unprotected." In 2021 Miller was dismissed by the university because of allegations from students that Miller engaged in antisemitism during one of his lectures. It was later found to constitute wrongful dismissal. Miller was cleared of any unlawful actions and in 2026, the Employment Appeal Tribunal upheld a 2024 employment tribunal finding that Miller's anti-Zionist beliefs constituted a protected philosophical belief under section 10 of the Equality Act 2010.

In 2023 Trevor published a series of articles relevant to the public debate in Israel concerning potential Judicial reforms that threatened the independence of the Israeli courts.

In 2023, Trevor Asserson launched a legal action against the BBC, accusing it of biased coverage of the Gaza conflict in violation of its editorial guidelines. He asserts that the BBC's report on an explosion at Al-Ahli Arab Hospital, initially blamed on Israel, typifies ongoing biased reporting. Asserson argues this reflects a systemic bias within the BBC that undermines its duty to impartiality.

In September 2024, Trevor Asserson led the publication of the “Asserson Report”, an investigation into how the BBC covered the Israel–Hamas war from October 2023 onwards. According to the report, the BBC breached its own editorial guidelines over 1,500 times, showing significant bias against Israel. The analysis was based on a review of over 9 million words of content across English and Arabic broadcasts. Israel Hayom reported that the study revealed a pronounced bias, alleging that the BBC “unequivocally sided with Hamas,” with over 90% of comments showing sympathy for the Palestinians.
