= Hate speech laws in the United Kingdom =

Hate speech laws in England and Wales are found in several statutes, and differ slightly from those adopted in Scotland. Expressions of hatred toward someone on account of that person's colour, race, sex, disability, nationality (including citizenship), ethnic or national origin, religion, or sexual orientation is forbidden. It is also illegal to communicate in a threatening or abusive way with the intention of harassing, alarming, or distressing someone. Penalties for hate speech can include fines, imprisonment, or both.

The Police and CPS have formulated definitions of hate crimes and hate incidents, with hate speech forming a subset of these. An incident is classified as a hate incident if the victim or anyone else believes that it was motivated by hostility or prejudice based on: disability, race, religion, gender identity or sexual orientation. A hate incident becomes a hate crime if it crosses the boundary of criminality.

Some United Kingdom statutes apply in Scotland and Northern Ireland.

== Scotland ==
The Scottish government has held an independent review of hate crime laws which it intends to use as the basis for a wider consultation on new legislation. This led to the introduction of the Hate Crime and Public Order (Scotland) Act 2021 which came into force on 1st April 2024.

== Statutes ==
=== Public Order Acts ===
==== Part 3 ====
In England, Wales, and Scotland, the Public Order Act 1986 prohibits, by its Part 3, expressions of racial hatred, which is defined as hatred against a group of persons by reason of the group's colour, race, nationality (including citizenship) or ethnic or national origins. Section 18 of the Act says:

A person who uses threatening, abusive or insulting words or behaviour, or displays any written material which is threatening, abusive or insulting, is guilty of an offence if—

(a) he intends thereby to stir up racial hatred, or

(b) having regard to all the circumstances racial hatred is likely to be stirred up thereby.

Offences under Part 3 carry a maximum sentence of seven years imprisonment or a fine or both.

==== Part 3A ====
The Racial and Religious Hatred Act 2006 amended the Public Order Act 1986 by adding Part 3A. That Part says, "A person who uses threatening words or behaviour, or displays any written material which is threatening, is guilty of an offence if he intends thereby to stir up religious hatred." The Part protects freedom of expression by stating in Section 29J:

Nothing in this Part shall be read or given effect in a way which prohibits or restricts discussion, criticism or expressions of antipathy, dislike, ridicule, insult or abuse of particular religions or the beliefs or practices of their adherents, or of any other belief system or the beliefs or practices of its adherents, or proselytising or urging adherents of a different religion or belief system to cease practising their religion or belief system.

The Criminal Justice and Immigration Act 2008 amended Part 3A of the Public Order Act 1986. The amendments to Part 3A introduce the offence of inciting hatred on the grounds of sexual orientation in England and Wales. All the offences in Part 3 relate to the following acts: the use of words or behaviour or display of written material, publication or distribution of written material, public performance of a play, distributing, showing or playing a recording, broadcasting or including a programme in a programme service, and possession of inflammatory material. In the circumstances of hatred based on religious belief or on sexual orientation, the relevant act (namely, words, behaviour, written material, or recordings, or programme) must be threatening and not just abusive or insulting.

==== Section 4A ====
The Criminal Justice and Public Order Act 1994 inserted Section 4A into the Public Order Act 1986. Said section makes it an offence causing alarm or distress in certain circumstances, including when using abusive or insulting words or behaviour.

==== Reform Section 5 campaign ====
In 2012, a campaign was launched by the Christian Institute to remove the word "insulting" from section 5 of the Public Order Act, saying that it constituted mere censorship. The campaign was backed by a number of high-profile activists including comedian Rowan Atkinson and former Shadow Home Secretary David Davis. On 12 December 2012, the House of Lords voted in favour of amending the Public Order Act to remove the word "insulting". In January 2013, the government announced that it would accept the amendment, despite having previously opposed it. The amendment to the Public Order Act was duly passed into law, as section 57 of the Crime and Courts Act 2013. Section 57 of the Act came into force on 1 February 2014.

=== Football Offences Act ===
The Football Offences Act 1991 (amended by the Football (Offences and Disorder) Act 1999) forbids indecent or racialist chanting at designated football matches.

The use of prisons to regulate hate speech has been critiqued from a normative perspective.

== Selected cases ==
On 13 October 2001, Harry Hammond, an evangelist, was arrested and charged under section 5 of the Public Order Act (1986) because he had displayed to people in Bournemouth a large sign bearing the words "Jesus Gives Peace, Jesus is Alive, Stop Immorality, Stop Homosexuality, Stop Lesbianism, Jesus is Lord". In April 2002, a magistrate convicted Hammond, fined him £300, and ordered him to pay costs of £395.

On 2 September 2006, Stephen Green was arrested in Cardiff for distributing pamphlets which called sexual activity between members of the same sex a sin. On 28 September 2006, the Crown advised Cardiff Magistrates Court that it would not proceed with the prosecution.

On 8 December 2009, District Judge Richard Clancy, sitting at Liverpool Magistrates' Court, acquitted Ben and Sharon Vogelenzang, hoteliers, of charges under the Public Order Act 1986 and under the Crime and Disorder Act 1998. The Vogelenzangs were charged after a guest at their hotel, Ericka Tazi, complained that the Vogelenzangs had insulted her after she appeared in a hijab.

On 4 March 2010, a jury returned a verdict of guilty against Harry Taylor, who was charged under Part 4A of the Public Order Act 1986. Taylor was charged because he left anti-religious cartoons in the prayer-room of Liverpool's John Lennon Airport on three occasions in 2008. The airport chaplain, who was insulted, offended, and alarmed by the cartoons, called the police. On 23 April 2010, Judge Charles James of Liverpool Crown Court sentenced Taylor to a six-month term of imprisonment suspended for two years, made him subject to a five-year Anti-Social Behaviour Order (ASBO) (which bans him from carrying religiously offensive material in a public place), ordered him to perform 100 hours of unpaid work, and ordered him to pay £250 costs. Taylor was convicted of similar offences in 2006.

On 20 April 2010, police arrested Dale McAlpine, a Christian preacher, of Workington in Cumbria, for saying that homosexual conduct was a sin. On 14 May 2010, the Crown decided not to prosecute McAlpine. Later still the police apologised to McAlpine for arresting him at all, and paid him several thousand pounds compensation.

On 23 April 2018, Scottish YouTuber Mark Meechan of Coatbridge, North Lanarkshire was fined £800 after being found "grossly offensive" for posting a YouTube video that was viewed over 3 million times depicting him training his girlfriend's pug to respond to the phrase "Sieg Heil" by lifting his paw in a Nazi salute. Tory MP Philip Davies requested a review of freedom of expression in parliament in response to the conviction. Comedians Ricky Gervais and David Baddiel tweeted in support of Meechan. Tom Walker, Shappi Khorsandi, and Stephen Fry defended Meechan and criticised other comedians for their silence on the issue. Meechan was sentenced to pay an £800 fine on 23 April 2018 and his appeals were unsuccessful. A crowd of about 500 people protested against the move in London.

In 2017, 19-year old Croxteth resident Chelsea Russell quoted a line from Snap Dogg's song "I'm Trippin'" on her Instagram page. The line, which read "Kill a snitch nigga, rob a rich nigga", was copied from a friend's page as part of a tribute to Frankie Murphy who was killed in a car accident at age 13. Hate crime investigators were alerted to the presence of the slur and charged Russell with "sending a grossly offensive message by means of a public electronic communications network". Defence lawyer Carole Clarke stated that she received a request from one of the arresting officers that the word "nigga", the subject of the trial, not be used in court. In April 2018, District Judge Jack McGarva found Russell guilty and delivered a sentence which included a £585 fine, a curfew and an ankle monitoring bracelet. However, Russell's conviction was overturned by Liverpool Crown Court on 21 February 2019.
