= Alfred Gollin =

American historian

Alfred M. Gollin
- Born: Alfred M. Gollin; 6 February 1926; New York City, United States
- Died: 30 October 2005 (aged 79)
- Education: City College of New York, Oxford University
- Occupation: Professor
- Employer: University of California

Alfred M. Gollin (February 6, 1926 – October 30, 2005) was an American scholar of European history.

== Early life and education ==
Born on February 6, 1926, in New York City to Russian Jewish immigrant parents, Gollin enlisted in the US Army in 1943 (immediately after his 17th birthday). He served in the field artillery in the European theater. After the war ended in Europe, Gollin was selected to attend New College, Oxford for a term as part of a program to send outstanding American soldiers to English universities. He returned to the US and earned his B.S. at City College of New York. William L. Langer (Harvard University) and Sir John Myers (Oxford University) encouraged him to return to Oxford for his B.A. He received the Cromwell Medal (1949) and the New College Essay Prize (1950) and earned his B.A. in 1951. He was appointed to an Extraordinary Lectureship in History at Oxford University and also served as official historian for The Observer for seven years. His D.Phil. thesis at Oxford was entitled "History of The Observer, 1905-1910".

== Career ==
Gollin taught from 1959 to 1961 at the University of California, Los Angeles, and then returned to conduct further research in Great Britain. He was called to the growing History Department of the University of California, Santa Barbara in 1966 where he joined Leonard Marsak, C. Warren Hollister, and Joachim Remak in building a strong European history program. Gollin was awarded an honorary Doctor of Letters degree from Oxford University in 1968. He was elected a Fellow of the Royal Historical Society and the Royal Society of Literature. He was a classroom lecturer who started each term's lecture with “Let me begin my story,” then continued each subsequent lecture with “Let me continue my story,” and prefaced the term's last lecture with “Let me end my story.” He also had an array of jokes throughout each class such as his “three rules of history” (“The British are always right,” “The Germans are always wrong,” and “Always kick a man when he is down”). He earned teaching accolades such as “Professor of the Year” at UCLA in 1960 and the Distinguished Teaching Award at UCSB in 1991.

== Selected publications ==
- Alfred Gollin (1960). The Observer and J. L. Garvin, 1908–14. Oxford: Oxford University Press.
- Alfred Gollin (1964). Proconsul in Politics: A Study of Lord Milner in Opposition and in Power. London: Blond.
- Alfred Gollin (1964). From Omdurman to V. E. Day: the life span of Sir Winston Churchill. London: Blond.
- Alfred Gollin (1965). Balfour's Burden: Arthur Balfour and Imperial Preference. London: Blond.
- Alfred Gollin (1984). No Longer an Island: Britain and the Wright Brothers, 1902–09. London: Heinemann.
- Alfred Gollin (1989). The Impact of Air Power on the British People and their Government, 1909–14. London: Macmillan.
