= Libel tourism =

Defamation litigation chosen based on favorable jurisdiction

Libel tourism is a term coined by Geoffrey Robertson to describe forum shopping for libel suits. It particularly refers to the practice of pursuing a case in England and Wales, in preference to other jurisdictions which provide more extensive defenses for those accused of making derogatory statements, such as the United States.

A critic of English defamation law, journalist Geoffrey Wheatcroft attributes the practice to the introduction of no win no fee agreements, the presumption that derogatory statements are false, the difficulty of establishing fair comment and "the caprice of juries and the malice of judges." Wheatcroft contrasts this with United States law since the New York Times Co. v. Sullivan case. "Any American public figure bringing an action now has to prove that what was written was not only untrue but published maliciously and recklessly."

Two other critics of English defamation law, the US lawyers Samuel A. Abady and Harvey Silverglate, have cited the example of Irish–Saudi businessman Khalid bin Mahfouz, who by the time of his death in 2009, had threatened suit more than 40 times in England against those who accused him of funding terrorism. Mahfouz also took legal action in Belgium, France and Switzerland against those repeating the accusations. George W. Bush advisor Richard Perle threatened to sue investigative reporter Seymour Hersh in London, because of a series of critical articles Hersh had written about him.

A series of cases involving US citizens being sued in English courts led to new laws in both countries. In the United States, the SPEECH Act unanimously passed the US Congress, which makes foreign defamation judgments unenforceable in US courts if they do not meet US free speech standards. In England and Wales, the Defamation Act 2013 requires plaintiffs to show that England is the proper jurisdiction to hear a case when the defendant does not live in England or Wales.

== Case law ==
=== Berezovsky v Michaels ===
In 2000, the House of Lords gave Boris Berezovsky and Nikolai Glushkov permission to sue Forbes for libel in the English courts. In 2003, the case was settled when Forbes offered a partial retraction.

The issues relating to jurisdiction of the English courts in such actions were appealed to the House of Lords, at that time the highest court in England and Wales, making this the key test case on libel tourism.

=== The Ehrenfeld case ===
Khalid bin Mahfouz and two members of his family sued Rachel Ehrenfeld, an Israeli-born writer and United States citizen, over her 2003 book on terrorist financing, Funding Evil, which asserted that Mahfouz and his family provided financial support to Islamic terrorist groups. The book was not published in Britain, although 23 copies of her book had been purchased online in the UK, and excerpts from the book had been published globally on the ABC News web site. Ehrenfeld was advised by English lawyer Mark Stephens to claim that the suit in England violated her First Amendment rights under the U.S. Constitution and chose not to defend the action. Instead, she countersued in the U.S. In his 2005 judgment, Justice Eady criticised Dr. Ehrenfeld for attempting to cash in on the libel action without being prepared to defend it on its merits and specifically rebutted her suggestion of forum shopping. Eady ruled that Ehrenfeld should pay £10,000 to each claimant plus costs, apologize for false allegations and destroy existing copies of her book.

Eady has been internationally criticized for his perceived bias in the case and his general restrictive approach to free speech. Additionally, the libel laws which were applied came under scrutiny in England, where calls for libel law reform increased after Ehrenfeld's case. Analyzing English libel law, the United Nations Human Rights Committee cautioned that: "practical application of the law of libel has served to discourage critical media reporting on matters of serious public interest, adversely affecting the ability of scholars and journalists to publish their work, including through the phenomenon known as 'libel tourism.' The advent of the internet and the international distribution of foreign media also create the danger that a State party's unduly restrictive libel law will affect freedom of expression worldwide on matters of valid public interest."

== Laws addressing libel tourism ==
=== England and Wales ===
On 1 January 2014, the Defamation Act 2013 came into force, requiring plaintiffs who bring actions in the courts of England and Wales alleging libel by defendants who do not live in Europe to demonstrate that the court is the most appropriate place to bring the action. Serious harm to an individual's reputation or serious financial harm to a corporation must also be proven. Good faith belief that a disclosure was in the public interest was made a defense.

=== United States ===
==== Federal ====
The Free Speech Protection Act of 2008 and 2009 were both bills aimed at addressing libel tourism by barring U.S. courts from enforcing libel judgments issued in foreign courts against U.S. residents, if the speech would not be libelous under American law. These protections were passed in the 2010 SPEECH Act which passed unanimously in both the House of Representatives and the Senate before being signed by US President Barack Obama on 10 August 2010.

==== New York ====
In late December 2007, the Second Circuit Court of Appeals, based on a decision by the New York State Court of Appeals, ruled that the state's current "long-arm" statutes governing business transactions did not give it jurisdiction to protect author Ehrenfeld. The court noted, however, that if the law were to change, Ehrenfeld could go back to court.

On 13 January 2008, two members of the New York State Legislature, Assemblyman Rory I. Lancman (D-Queens) and Senator Dean Skelos (R-LI), introduced a "Libel Terrorism Protection Act" in both legislative houses (bills no. A09652 and S 6676-B) to amend the New York civil procedures in response to the Ehrenfeld case. The bill passed the New York state legislature on a rare unanimous vote, and on 29 April 2008, Gov. Paterson signed the bill into law. The Libel Terrorism Protection Act enables New York courts to assert jurisdiction over anyone who obtains a foreign libel judgment against a New York publisher or writer, and to limit enforcement to those judgments that satisfy "the freedom of speech and press protections guaranteed by both the United States and New York Constitutions."

==== California ====
In October 2009, California Governor Arnold Schwarzenegger signed into law protections against libel tourism (California's Libel Tourism Act) that took effect 1 January 2010. The Act provides that California courts shall not recognize a foreign-country judgment if "the judgment includes recovery for a claim of defamation unless the court determines that the defamation law applied by the foreign court provided at least as much protection for freedom of speech and the press as provided by both the United States and California Constitutions" (C.C.P. sec. 1716(c)(9)) and other protections. The law received significant bi-partisan support.

==== Illinois ====
In August 2008, Illinois enacted a libel tourism law that is similar to the statute passed in New York.

==== Florida ====
In May 2009, Florida also enacted a libel tourism law similar to the law passed in New York.

== See also ==
- Defamation
- Forum shopping
- Khalid bin Mahfouz
- Investigative journalism
- Simon Singh
