= BT Retail =

BT Retail was a former division of BT Group that split in 2013 into two divisions. See:

- BT Consumer
- BT Business
