= SPEECH Act =

2010 U.S. law limiting foreign defamation cases

Securing the Protection of our Enduring and Established Constitutional Heritage Act
- Long title: An Act to amend title 28, United States Code, to prohibit recognition and enforcement of foreign defamation judgments and certain foreign judgments against the providers of interactive computer services
- Nicknames: SPEECH Act
- Enacted by: the 111th United States Congress
- Effective: August 10, 2010

Citations
- Public law: Pub. L. 111–223 (text) (PDF)
- Statutes at Large: 124 Stat. 2380–2384

Codification
- U.S.C. sections created: 28 U.S.C. §§ 4101–4105

Legislative history
- Introduced in the House as H.R. 2765 by Steve Cohen (D–TN) on June 9, 2009; Committee consideration by House Judiciary, Senate Judiciary; Passed the House on June 15, 2009 (voice vote); Passed the Senate on July 19, 2010 (unanimous consent) with amendment; House agreed to Senate amendment on July 27, 2010 (voice vote); Signed into law by President Barack Obama on August 10, 2010

The Securing the Protection of our Enduring and Established Constitutional Heritage (SPEECH) Act is a 2010 federal statutory law in the United States that makes foreign libel judgments unenforceable in U.S. courts, unless either the foreign legislation applied offers at least as much protection as the U.S. First Amendment (concerning freedom of speech), or the defendant would have been found liable even if the case had been heard under U.S. law.

The act was passed by the 111th United States Congress and signed into law by President Barack Obama.

== Purpose ==
The act was written as a response to libel tourism. It creates a new cause of action and claim for damages against a foreign libel plaintiff, if they acted to deprive an American (or certain lawful aliens) of their right to free speech. Despite its goals, it has been criticized as an insufficiently strong response to the problem of libel tourism. Although it establishes a new cause of action in § 4104, and allows for the collection of "reasonable" attorneys' fees in § 4105, (Note: In the United States, in contrast to most other jurisdictions, this is not normally the case unless enumerated in statute. See also: Attorney's fee § Who pays, English Rule and American rule.) it does not allow for damages to plaintiffs, in contrast with stronger provisions in proposed bills which did not pass such as the Free Speech Protection Act of 2009 (H.R.1304, 111th Congress).

It was inspired by the legal battle that ensued between Dr. Rachel Ehrenfeld and Saudi businessman Khalid bin Mahfouz over her 2003 book Funding Evil.

== Provisions ==
The Act amends Part VI of title 28, United States Code, by adding a new section 181 titled "Foreign Judgments". The legislation as signed contains findings that overseas libel claims have a chilling effect on free speech, matters of "serious public interest", and investigative journalism, and that internationally, little has been done about this. The Act provides that:

1. Domestic U.S. courts shall not domestically recognize or enforce any judgment for defamation issued in a foreign court, unless the jurisdiction concerned offers at least as much protection of free speech as the First Amendment, or alternatively, that the defendant would still have been found liable even under U.S. law in a U.S. court, applying the First Amendment;
2. The foreign court's conduct of the case must have respected the due process guarantees of the U.S. Constitution to the same extent as a U.S. court;
3. Claims that would be barred in the U.S. under s.230 of the Communications Act (47 U.S.C. 230, providing protection for online web host services) remain barred unless their outcome would be consistent with that which a U.S. court would have reached on the facts, if the defamation had been in the United States;
4. A defendant's prior appearance in a foreign court in connection with the case does not prevent that person opposing or defending a claim for enforcement in a U.S. court;
5. Claims may be removed to a federal court if any plaintiff and any defendant are from different states, or not from the United States;
6. Any United States person subjected to a foreign judgment for defamation may bring an action in a U.S. court to obtain a declaratory judgment that the overseas defamation judgment is "repugnant to the Constitution or laws of the United States" for any of these reasons; if successful then the foreign case cannot be enforced in the U.S.

Various burdens of proof and cost allocations are also specified.

== Legislative history ==
The Act was passed unanimously in both the House of Representatives and the Senate (as H.R. 2765) before being signed by President Obama on August 10, 2010. Two earlier bills had aimed to address the topic of libel tourism, both with the proposed title of the "Free Speech Protection Act"; they were introduced in 2008 and 2009, in the 110th and 111th United States Congress respectively, but neither was passed.

The SPEECH Act has been endorsed by several U.S. organizations, including the American Library Association, the Association of American Publishers, the Reporters Committee for Freedom of the Press, and the American Civil Liberties Union.

== Use in courts ==
In April 2011, Pontigon v. Lord was the first case addressing application of the SPEECH Act. It was heard in Missouri courts. InvestorsHub.com v. Mina Mar Group was the first federal judgment that referenced the act, but the matter was ultimately settled out of court.

Trout Point Lodge v. Doug K. Handshoe was the first appellate level ruling issued under the act, affirming a lower court decision holding that a Nova Scotia judgment was unrecognizable and unenforceable in the United States. Pursuant to the fee-shifting provision of the act, in 2013, the trial court awarded Handshoe $48,000 in legal fees.

The only examples of law journal treatment of the application of the SPEECH Act in the Trout Point Lodge case have criticized the Act. In the Roger Williams Law Review author Nicole Manzo wrote: "the Act fails to differentiate between legitimate forum selection and illegitimate forum shopping. Moreover, I assert that the Act affords too little protection to foreign defamation plaintiffs. I argue that the exceptions to non-enforcement are illusory and fail to provide courts with appropriate guidance. More pointedly, the Act does not explicitly state how speech protection should be applied in a given case." An article in the Journal of International & Comparative Law of the Chicago-Kent College of Law has supported those conclusions to find that the SPEECH Act, as applied by both the district court and the United States Court of Appeals for the Fifth Circuit in Trout Point Lodge v. Handshoe, is overly broad and in sorry need of reform: "the instant case ... exposes a potential over inclusivity of the SPEECH Act because of its universal applicability in defamation cases and lack of distinction between illegitimate and legitimate fora. Without the proper ability to distinguish between the two types of fora, the SPEECH Act penalizes those plaintiffs filing claims in good faith in appropriate fora." The article goes on to discuss the "fundamental failing" of the SPEECH Act, and to state that the Act "should be amended".

In 2014, the same federal district court rejected Handshoe's attempt to have a Canadian copyright infringement judgment against him removed to federal court using the SPEECH Act; the case was remanded. Handshoe tried to bring the case to federal court again in 2015 citing the SPEECH Act and diversity jurisdiction, after it was re-enrolled in Mississippi state court; the case was again remanded. The judge stated: "unlike the judgment at issue in the claim previously before the Fifth Circuit and this Court, the judgment at issue here does not involve allegations of false or damaging forms of speech et al. Instead, the judgment concerns purported property rights in photographic images."

In state court, Handshoe again filed motions arguing the SPEECH Act should block enforcement of the Canadian judgment against him. His motion was denied in January 2017. "The judgment of the Nova Scotia Supreme Court is not repugnant to Mississippi law. And the judgment does not conflict with the SPEECH Act of 2010 as determined by the United States District Court's February 17, 2016 remand order."

The Electronic Frontier Foundation (EFF) successfully used the SPEECH Act in EFF v. Global Equity, a 2017 case stemming from the EFF's criticism of a patent claim by Global Equity; the EFF called Global Equity "a classic patent troll", for which Global Equity made a defamation claim in a South Australian court and an injunction was subsequently ordered. In American courts, this was deemed to be a violation of First Amendment protections under the SPEECH Act.

== See also ==
- Acts of the 111th United States Congress
