= Guillaume Dasquié =

French journalist and writer

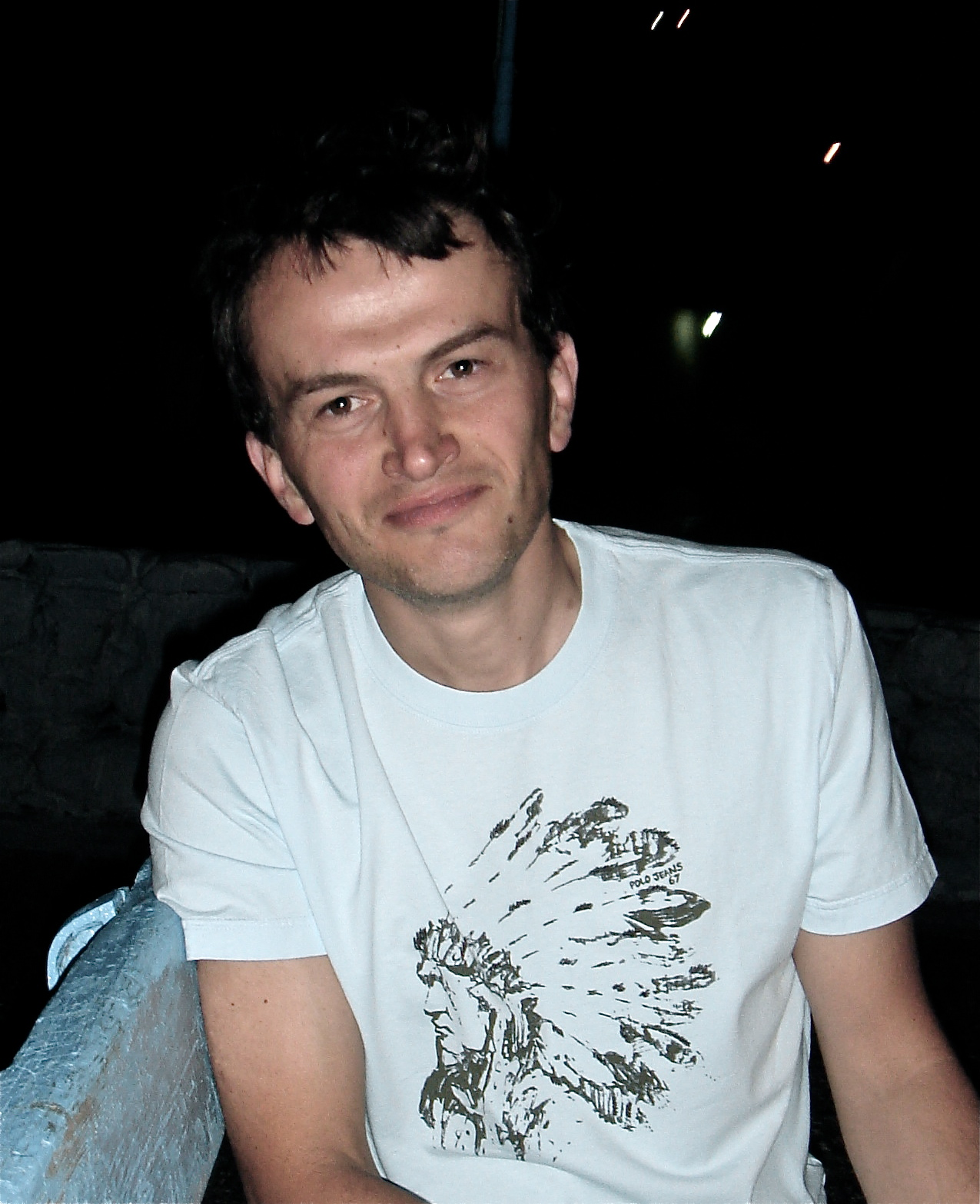
Dasquié in 2006

Guillaume Dasquié (b. Cahors, 4 February 1966) is a French author and television documentary filmmaker. His books, stories, and documentaries focus on geopolitical topics and issues related to the tech industry.

His latest book, Les recruteurs (a novel), was published in 2022 by Grasset. His latest documentary, Sky ECC: la messagerie du crime (Sky ECC : the crime messaging), has been airing in France on Canal+ since May 2025.

== Biography ==
=== Family and education ===
Guillaume Dasquié grew up in a family of cabinetmakers, in Cahors (southwestern France). He studied law in Toulouse and in Paris, before working as a journalist.

=== Career ===
After starting his career at the French TV network Canal+, he turned to writing investigative books. His first, Secrètes affaires (Covert business), was published in 1999 by Flammarion. He describes the inner workings of the American private intelligence agency Kroll as well as various destabilization operations, in France and abroad. From 1999 to 2003, he served as editor-in-chief of Intelligence Online, a publication focus on risks and intelligence issues.

Two months after September 11, 2001, he published Ben Laden: La vérité interdite - translated in the United States as Forbidden Truth. The book tells the story of the first Interpol warrant for Osama bin Laden, issued by Libya, the negociations between the United States and the Taliban until August 2001, and asserts that some Saudi businessmen supported al-Qaeda.

In June 2002, he published L'effroyable mensonge (The Horrible Lie), an investigation criticizing conspiracy theories about 9/11—such as the claims that no plane crashed into the Pentagon or that the attack was organized by small American groups.

Between 2004 and 2006, he worked as a consultant on terrorism issues for a firm run by the French expert Jean-Charles Brisard (based in Lausanne, Switzerland). Guillaume Dasquié subsequently ended his collaboration with Brisard, criticizing his methods and ties to French intelligence agencies.

In 2007, he returned to journalism and published an investigative report in Le Monde describing what the French and American intelligence agencies knew about al-Qaeda before September 11. This investigative report is based on 320 classified pages from the French intelligence agency, the DGSE. The article revealed a January 2001 memo showing that the French and Americans knew that Al-Qaeda was seeking to carry out a terrorist attack against the United States using commercial airliners. The book Histoire politique des services secrets français (Political History of the French Secret Services), published six years later, revisits the significance of this memo.

The article prompted the Ministry of Defense to file a criminal complaint for national secrecy violation. In December 2007, it led to a search by the French security service, DCRI, of Guillaume Dasquié’s home and his detention. Several organizations then expressed their support for the author, including the NGO Reporters Without Borders, the National Union of Journalists, and the OSCE Office for the Freedom of the Press. Initial evidence suggests that the authorities were seeking to identify the author’s source(s). Guillaume Dasquié remained under judicial supervision for seven years before being fully acquitted.

This case sparked debates in the French National Assembly regarding a new law on the protection of journalists’ sources, particularly during the session on May 15, 2008, when it was cited numerous times. Guillaume Dasquié was also interviewed by the lawmakers tasked with drafting the legislation.

Between 2008 and 2011, he published investigative reports in the daily newspaper Libération and the weekly Charlie Hebdo on terrorism cases, primarily focusing on the 2002 Karachi bombing. The case was then reopened thanks to a report by a private investigator with whom Guillaume Dasquié had exchanged several communications. The author challenges the initial account provided by the Paris Public Prosecutor’s Office and French security services, which attributed the attack to Al-Qaeda, and instead posits that it was a retaliatory act ordered by a Saudi intermediary.

In the following years, he published investigative reports in Vanity Fair (french version) and Le Journal du Dimanche, focusing on the assassination of Lebanese Prime Minister Rafic Hariri and the Lafarge case. On the latter topic—concerning the industrialist’s compromises during the war in Syria—his articles revealed that the DGSI knew that Lafarge was funneling funds to jihadist militias and that it refrained from reporting it.

Starting in 2018, he began writing for print media and primarily producing documentaries and television reports. In 2021, his report from Sana’a in northern Yemen revealed life inside the enclave held by the Houthi regime. This documentary aired in Germany on Deutsche Welle and in France on M6 TV. In October 2022, in Potsdam, it was selected for the European Union’s Prix Europa (in the Best European TV Current Affairs category) and received the Human Rights Documentary Award at the Life After Oil Festival, held in Sardinia.

Until 2023, he directed a 55-minute documentary on the Lafarge affair in Syria, which reveals how employees and consultants at the Syrian cement plant collaborated with French intelligence services. The cement plant’s main Syrian intermediary, businessman Firas Tlass—whom French authorities were never able to question—speaks on camera in the film and explains that he carried out missions for the DGSE while the plant was still in operation. Later, this investigation led to Guillaume Dasquié being called to testify before the Paris Court during the Lafarge trial, which took place in December 2025.

== See also ==
- September 11, 2001 attacks
