= Jean-Charles Brisard =

French terrorism expert (born 1968)

- Born: 13 May 1968 (age 57); Dijon, France
- Occupations: Expert, consultant

Jean-Charles Brisard (French pronunciation: [ʒɑ̃ ʃaʁl bʁizaʁ]; born May 13, 1968, in Dijon, France) is a French international consultant and expert on terrorism.

== Education ==
In 1990 Jean-Charles Brisard graduated from the School of Foreign Service of Georgetown University in Washington D.C., USA. In 1991, he studied common law, islamic law, Eastern European law and Oil & Gas Law and obtained a M.D at the Institute of Comparative Law. In 1992, Jean-Charles Brisard went to the Panthéon-Assas University and obtained a M.A. in European and International Law and a Master of Advanced Studies in public international Law in 1994.

== Career ==
=== Early career ===
In 1990, he was assistant for foreign Policy of U.S. Senator Timothy E. Wirth, in charge of reporting on international sanctions mechanisms and terrorism. From 1992 to 1993 he was assistant to Pierre Lellouche, diplomatic advisor to the mayor of Paris Jacques Chirac. His studies mainly focused on the French intelligence reforms and national security decision-making system. Between 1993 and 1994 Jean-Charles Brisard was legal advisor to the President of French Polynesia Gaston Flosse, before joining the French prime minister office as press assistant to Édouard Balladur, the French prime minister, he was also legislative advisor to Alain Marsaud, former Paris anti-terrorism chief prosecutor.

In 1997, Jean-Charles Brisard became advisor to the director of the water division for business intelligence at La Compagnie Générale des Eaux. In 1998, he became deputy director of analysis and prospective, and special advisor to the vice-president for business intelligence at Vivendi Universal France.

=== Islamist terrorism ===
Jean-Charles Brisard authored a study on the financial network of the Bin Laden organization, "The economic environment of Osama Bin Laden". His report was written for the French intelligence community and published by the French national assembly in 2001. He testified on his work before the US Congress Joint Inquiry into the terrorist attacks of September 11, 2001 and before the U.S. Senate Banking Committee. Jean-Charles Brisard served as an expert or witness in prosecutions of terrorism financing and money laundering cases in France, Switzerland, the UK and the United States. He also provides training on terrorism and terrorism financing for the French authorities.

Between 2002 and 2009, Brisard joined Motley Rice llc, a USA based plaintiffs' litigation firms as co-counsel, chief investigator and expert on terrorism and terrorism financing for 9/11 Families class-actions, representing over 6,500 family members of the victims.

After the November 2015 Paris attacks, Brisard was quoted by the media about an important aspect concerning the perpetrators who were mostly European nationals who had been in Syria temporarily and had returned radicalized. "We have changed the paradigm," Brisard said. "Our own citizens come back to Europe to perpetrate attacks. Europe needs to take that into account." In fact, experts indicate that more than 3,000 Europeans have traveled to Syria and joined Islamic State and other radical groups, as reported by the Los Angeles Times.

=== Impersonation scandal ===
In November 2017, Jean-Charles Brisard was caught on video impersonating a journalist from The Wall Street Journal in an attempt to obtain sensitive information from short seller Carson Block of Muddy Waters Research about the French retail company Groupe Casino. Block had criticized Groupe Casino in 2015 for using accounting gimmicks and financial engineering to inflate earnings. The Wall Street Journal subsequently wrote an article with the headline "To Meet Carson Block, He Posed as a Journal Reporter...and Got Caught" that cited sources linking Jean-Charles Brisard to past investigations conducted by Groupe Casino.

== Prizes and awards ==
- Knight of the National Order of Merit (France) (2008)

== Books ==
- The New Face of Al-Qaeda (Polity Press) about Jordanian terrorist Abu Musab al-Zarqawi, with Damien Martinez, 2005.
- Forbidden Truth: U.S.-taliban Secret Oil Diplomacy And The Failed Hunt For Bin Laden, with Guillaume Dasquié, 2002 (The Nation books)
- The economic environment of Osama Ben Laden, 2001
- Enquête du Coeur du RPR, 1996 (Jacques Grancher – Hachette)
- Charles Pasqua, une force peu tranquille, 1995 (Jacques Grancher – Hachette)
