= Bonus Books =

American book publisher

- Parent company: Rowman & Littlefield
- Status: Active
- Founded: 1972; 53 years ago
- Country of origin: United States
- Headquarters location: Chicago, Illinois (1972–2002); Los Angeles, California (2002–present)
- Distribution: Worldwide
- Publication types: Books
- Imprints: Volt Press
- Owner(s): Rowman & Littlefield
- Official website: rowman.com/Action/Search/COP/Bonus%20Books

Bonus Books is an American book publisher based in Los Angeles, California. The company publishes approximately 30 books per year, primarily "how to" books on subjects such as casino gambling, sports biographies, broadcasting and journalism. Frequent authors include Frank Scoblete and John Grochowski. An additional imprint is Volt Press.

== History ==
The company was established in the 1970s and was based in Chicago, Illinois until 2002, when it was acquired by a Los Angeles publishing executive, Jeffrey Stern, who had previously published Details magazine.

Bonus Books is currently owned by Rowman & Littlefield.

== Selected titles ==
- The Divorce Lawyers’ Guide to Staying Married
- Best Newspaper Writing
- Broadcast Voice Handbook
- Get the Edge
- Covering Catastrophe
- The Slot Machine Answer Book
- Straight Whisky : A Living History of Sex, Drugs, and Rock ‘n’ Roll on the Sunset Strip
- Funding Evil: How Terrorism is Financed and How to Stop It
