= Khalid bin Mahfouz =

Saudi businessman accused of funding al-Qaeda (1949–2009)

- Born: December 26, 1949; Jeddah, Saudi Arabia
- Died: August 16, 2009 (aged 59); Jeddah, Saudi Arabia
- Occupation: Investor
- Website: www.binmahfouz.info

Khalid bin Mahfouz (Arabic: خالد بن محفوظ; December 26, 1949 – August 16, 2009) was a Saudi Arabian billionaire, banker, businessman, investor and former chairman of the National Commercial Bank (NCB). Khalid is the son of Salem Bin Mahfouz, a Saudi entrepreneur who rose from being a small-time money-changer to becoming the founder of the NCB, the first private Saudi bank.

With a personal wealth estimated to be around $6 billion, Bin Mahfouz ranked 24th in Arabian Business magazine's list of the world's most influential Arabs in 2008. In the same year, Bin Mahfouz ranked number 214 in Forbes Billionaires List

After the September 11 attacks on New York and Washington, in which 15 of the 19 hijackers were Saudis, considerable suspicion fell on Saudi financiers and charities as sources of financing for terrorism, and Khalid Bin Mahfouz faced accusations in books, newspapers and magazines that he and his family had funneled money to Al Qaeda.

== Biography ==
Khalid bin Mahfouz was the second eldest son of Salem Ahmed bin Mahfouz, a Saudi who rose from being an illiterate money-changer to the founder of the first bank in his country, the National Commercial Bank of Saudi Arabia (NCB). Salem Ahmed then became the personal banker of the Saudi royal family. He handed management of NCB, the largest bank in the country, to Khalid sometime in the 1980s.

In the 1970s Khalid bin Mahfouz bought and lived in a $3.5 million chateaux-style house, later named "Versailles," in the River Oaks area of Houston. He also bought forty four thousand acre (16 km^{2}) ranch along the Trinity River in Liberty County, Texas, near the ranch of James Bath. Another of his estates, resting on 121 acres, was reportedly put up for sale at auction on April 11, 2013 with a guide price of 2.4 million euro.

In 1990 Khalid bin Mahfouz acquired Irish citizenship through inward-investment procedures.

Bin Mahfouz was married with three children. His personal net worth was $3.2 billion in 2006, making him one of the richest people in the world at the time; his family fortune were estimated to have been worth over $4 billion.

== Controversies and allegations ==
=== Alleged brother-in-law of Osama bin Laden ===
This allegation came from high-profile people, book authors and well respected newspapers in the US and Europe such as The Wall Street Journal and The Washington Post. All turned out to be based on false information. For example, James Woolsey, former Director of CIA, testified to a congressional subcommittee that Khalid Bin Mahfouz was a brother-in-law of Osama bin Laden. He later on told Los Angeles Times 'I don't know what to say other than there was some confusion, but I never meant to refer to Bin Mahfouz's sister'."

The Wall Street Journal issued a correction. "None of Khalid bin Mahfouz's sisters is, or ever has been, married to Osama bin Laden."

=== $225 million BCCI scandal fine ===
Bin Mahfouz was a non-executive director of Bank of Credit and Commerce International, a financial conglomerate later convicted of money laundering, bribery, support of terrorism, arms trafficking, and many other crimes. Mahfouz personally owned a 20% stake in BCCI. He was indicted by a New York state grand jury for fraud but denied any culpability. In 1995, the fraud charges were settled for $225 million in lieu of fines. Mr. Bin Mahfouz has claimed that he simply settled as a business decision rather than using resources to fight further.

=== Donations to Osama bin Laden in 1988 ===
Craig Unger's book House of Bush, House of Saud says that bin Mahfouz donated over $270,000 to Osama bin Laden's Islamist organization at the request of Osama's brother Salem bin Laden. Bin Mahfouz's lawyer stated: "This donation was to assist the US-sponsored resistance to the Soviet occupation of Afghanistan and was never intended nor, to the best of Sheikh Khalid's knowledge, ever used to fund any 'extension' of that resistance movement in other countries."

=== Alleged NCB funding of al-Qaeda ===
Khalid bin Mahfouz has denied that NCB, his bank, was involved in funding an al-Qaeda group. According to reports, high-placed Saudi businessmen transferred millions of dollars through NCB to charities operating as fronts for al-Qaeda. Mahfouz states that he could not have been aware of every wire transfer moving through the bank, and that he would not have allowed such transactions had he known they were taking place.

Additionally, Forbes reports:

[I]n 1999 the [Saudi] government stepped in, buying a controlling 50% stake of NCB from Khalid for at least $1 billion, partly used to wipe Khalid's debt from the books. Khalid and his family retained 34% ownership, but he again surrendered his management positions. . . The extent of Khalid's mismanagement at NCB remains shrouded. NCB has not issued audited numbers since 1998, but it did acknowledge last year that provisions for bad loans in 1999 and 2000 reached $934 million, covering 86% of its doubtful debt.

NCB senior officials vehemently deny the existence of this audit.

He eventually won a string of lawsuits against writers who had accused him of supporting terrorism, with a notable exception of Rachel Ehrenfeld. Ehrenfeld, the author of Funding Evil and a U.S. citizen based in New York, had not written or marketed her book internationally and refused to acknowledge the jurisdiction of the English court over her case, instead alleging that Mahfouz was using the High Court of Justice for libel tourism. Her refusal resulted in Justice Eady in the High Court awarding a default judgment against her in 2005. Ehrenfeld was ordered to apologize, destroy all copies of her book and pay him $230,000 in damages. The New York State Legislature, however, passed a law preventing the judgments from being enforced by providing greater protection against libel judgments in countries whose laws are inconsistent with the freedom of speech granted by the United States Constitution.

Sheik Mahfouz did acknowledge making one contribution of $270,000 to Al Qaeda during the epoch of the Soviet occupation of Afghanistan.

=== Muwafaq Foundation ===
Khalid bin Mahfouz helped set up a charity organization called the Muwafaq Foundation, Muwafaq being Arabic for "blessed relief". He funded this charity with $30 million, and put his eldest son, Abdulrahman bin Mahfouz, on the board of directors. In October 2001, the U.S. Treasury Department named Muwafaq Foundation a front organization. Neither Khalid nor Abdulrahman were accused of funding terrorism by the United States; however Yasin al-Qadi, a Saudi national hired to run the charity, was named a supporter of terrorism and had his assets frozen by the U.S. Treasury Department.

=== UN designation ===
There have been numerous allegations that Khalid bin Mahfouz has been named a terrorist financier by the United Nations. The controversy springs from a report prepared by French investigator Jean-Charles Brisard and his research agency, the JCB Consulting Group, for the President of the Security Council of the United Nations in December 2002. In this report Khalid was listed as one of seven "main individual Saudi sponsors of al Qaeda."
