= Funding Evil =

2003 book by Rachel Ehrenfeld

Funding Evil: How Terrorism is Financed and How to Stop It
- Cover of the first edition of Funding Evil
- Author: Rachel Ehrenfeld
- Language: English
- Genre: Current affairs
- Publisher: Bonus Books
- Publication date: 23 August 2003
- Publication place: United States
- Pages: 267
- ISBN: 1-56625-196-6
- OCLC: 52757507
- Dewey Decimal: 363.32 22
- LC Class: HV6431 .E394 2003

Funding Evil: How Terrorism is Financed and How to Stop It is a book written by counterterrorism researcher Dr. Rachel Ehrenfeld, director of the American Center for Democracy and the Economic Warfare Institute. It was published by Bonus Books of Los Angeles, California in August 2003.

== Content ==
Ehrenfeld argues in the book that international networks are used by terrorist groups to finance terrorist activity worldwide. She describes the activities of individuals, various charities, banks, drug trafficking networks, money-laundering schemes and bribed officials, documenting the involvement of specific groups, organizations and individuals of being involved. The involvement of Iran, Hezbollah, and al Qaeda in the drug trade is given particular attention. Ehrenfeld asserts that "it was bin Laden who managed the drug profits for the Taliban and arranged money-laundering operations with the Russian Mafiya." Ehrenfeld goes on to argue that the international community should take stronger action against terrorist funding, including imposing economic sanctions on states that fund or foster terrorism, such as Saudi Arabia, Iran, Syria, Sudan, Indonesia, Libya, North Korea, and Malaysia. Ehrenfeld's book criticizes international aid organizations as well for their often inadvertent support of terror.

== Reviews ==
The book received a mixed reaction from reviewers. William B. Scott wrote in Aviation Week & Space Technology that the book is "brutally bipartisan and international in its bare-knuckled explanations of how political power and corporate greed have emboldened and strengthened the likes of Osama bin Laden and Yasar Arafat, while allowing future terrorists to be recruited and trained." He concluded that it "should be required reading for every elected and senior government official in the U.S. and Europe--especially those charged with counterterrorism responsibilities." Nan Goldberg reviewed the book in The Star Ledger, commenting that the book leads to the "inescapable conclusion that the West is funding its own destruction, not only in allowing its economy to become and remain dependent on oil, but also by providing a market for illegal services."

== Libel controversy ==
Cover of the second edition of Funding Evil, updated to reflect the libel case, saying "the book the Saudis don't want you to read".

The book became the subject of international legal controversy when the Saudi businessman Khalid bin Mahfouz and his sons, Abdulrahman and Sultan, alleged in the book to be terrorist financiers, sued the author for libel in London. Although the book was not published in the United Kingdom, the lawsuit was made possible when 23 copies were purchased in England via online booksellers, and a chapter of the book was published for a short time on ABC TV's website. Ehrenfeld refused to acknowledge the jurisdiction of the British courts and did not appear to defend the suit. The High Court of Justice ruled against her by default. The court ordered her and her publisher to pay £10,000 in damages to each of the three plaintiffs, with an additional £80,000 costs for a total of £110,000. Further distribution of the book from the United States was also prohibited with a previous injunction being continued. Ehrenfeld was also ordered to publish a correction and apology, but had no intention of complying.

The judge noted that "the nature of the allegations which were made in the book... are of the most serious and defamatory kind." He added that under English law, the defendants had the opportunity to counter the suit by attempting to "prove, on the balance of probabilities, that the defamatory allegations were substantially true". The Mahfouz family published a statement on their website, declaring that a number of "serious errors of fact" had been published about the family and that they "abhor violence as a way of achieving political or other objectives". Mahfouz had posted similar statements on his website regarding more than 40 similar libel cases and threats to sue against authors and publishers from many countries including the U.S.

Ehrenfeld accused Mahfouz of "forum shopping", using English libel law to chill investigations ("libel tourism"). Her argument was based on the fact that Mahfouz resided in Jeddah, Saudi Arabia at the time of the suit and had sued her in England as opposed to the United States because the libel law framework in England was more favorable to plaintiffs. This was rejected by Justice Eady. Mahfouz's English lawyer argued that "Our clients have brought proceedings in England because they maintain residences, transact business and have reputations to protect in this jurisdiction."

Ehrenfeld's actions following the initiation of Mahfouz's lawsuit were also noted by the court. A second edition of Funding Evil was published in the US with a new introduction commenting on the lawsuit and the book's cover was amended with the tagline "The book the Saudis don't want you to read".

=== Counter-suit ===
In December 2004, before the English libel suit had concluded, Ehrenfeld pre-emptively counter-sued bin Mahfouz in the United States District Court for the Southern District of New York. She sought a declaration that the English judgment could not be enforced in the US and that the allegations that she had made against Mahfouz were not defamatory under US law. Her complaint asserted that the Mahfouzes' litigation violated her rights under the First Amendment to the United States Constitution, arguing that Mahfouz "seriously chills legitimate and good-faith investigation into his behaviour. With the benefit of his vast financial resources, he has managed to silence his critics one at a time." In addition, she asserted that she had not properly been served notice and lacked the financial resources to fight bin Mafouz's lawsuit in England.

Her case was supported by free-press advocates in the United States, who argued that the case underlined the incompatibility of the English legal system with US constitutional rights. Sandra Baron, the executive director of the Media Law Resource Center in New York, argued that "it's critically important that American journalists and scholars be able to publish on topics of profound importance without having to look over their shoulders to make sure someone isn't suing them in the United Kingdom." A number of major media organizations supported her case, including the Authors Guild, Forbes, the American Society of Newspaper Editors, the Association of American Publishers, and Amazon. Major newspapers also supported the cause, including the New York Times, the Washington Post, and the Los Angeles Times.

Mahfouz sought to have the New York case dismissed, claiming that the court had no jurisdiction over him and no power to rule in the issues raised by Ehrenfeld. Judge Richard C. Casey found in his favour and dismissed the case in April 2006, ruling that the court lacked personal jurisdiction over Mahfouz under New York state law.

Ehrenfeld appealed the case to the United States Court of Appeals for the Second Circuit. Ehrenfeld's appeal was again supported by many media organisations in a consolidated amicus curiae brief, which argued that the "growing and dangerous threat of 'libel tourism' – the cynical and aggressive use of claimant-friendly libel laws in foreign jurisdictions ... has chilled and will continue to chill Dr Ehrenfeld's exercise of her free speech".

The Second Circuit referred the case to the New York Court of Appeals, New York's highest appellate court, emphasizing that the case had implications for all U.S. authors and publishers whose First Amendment rights were threatened by foreign libel rulings. The Court of Appeals was asked specifically to determine whether § 302(a)(1) of New York's civil procedure rules conferred personal jurisdiction over a person who "(1) sued a New York resident in a non-U.S. jurisdiction; and (2) whose contacts with New York stemmed from the foreign lawsuit and whose success in the foreign suit resulted in acts that must be performed by the subject of the suit in New York." Based on the Appellate Court's response, the Second Circuit, in its final decision, noted that if the law on New York State court jurisdiction were to change, Ehrenfeld could bring suit again.

=== Subsequent legislative activity ===
Following the Second Circuit decision, two members of the New York State Legislature, Assemblyman Rory I. Lancman (D-25) and Senator Dean Skelos (R-9) introduced a Libel Terrorism Protection Act in both houses of the Legislature (bills no. A09652 and S 6676-B) in January 2008 to amend the New York civil procedures in response to the case. Free-press advocates in the author and publisher community strongly supported the passage of the bill.

The bill passed the New York State Legislature unanimously and was signed into law on April 29, 2008. The law enables New York courts to assert jurisdiction over anyone who obtains a foreign libel judgment against a New York publisher or writer, and limit enforcement to those judgments that satisfy "the freedom of speech and press protections guaranteed by both the United States and New York Constitutions". The Libel Terrorism Protection Act "offers New Yorkers greater protection against libel judgments in countries whose laws are inconsistent with the freedom of speech granted by the United States Constitution".

As of July 2010, six other states have passed analogs to Rachel's Law: Illinois, Florida, California, Tennessee, Maryland, and Utah.

A federal bill based on Rachel's Law, the SPEECH Act, was passed in the 111th Congress, by unanimous vote of both the House of Representatives (as HR 2765 in 2009) and the Senate (as S 3518 in 2010), and signed into law by President Barack Obama in August 2010. Like Rachel's law, the SPEECH Act declares foreign libel judgments to be unenforceable in the US unless they meet the criteria set forth by the First Amendment. The act contains further provisions allowing the libel plaintiff to be counter-sued for a declaration if the foreign libel judgment is "repugnant" to American constitutional law, with the possibility of recovering damages.

== See also ==
- List of charities accused of ties to terrorism
- Alms for Jihad
