= Frank J. Frost =

American scholar (1929–2026)

Frank J. Frost (December 3, 1929 – January 9, 2026) was an American scholar of Ancient Greek history, archaeologist, politician, and novelist.

== Early life and education ==
Born in Washington, DC, on December 3, 1929, to businessman Frank J. Frost Sr., and Eugenia Frost, Frank Frost grew up in Palo Alto, CA. After high school and some college, he served in the US Army during the Korean War. He returned to the US from Korea and earned his B.A. at the University of California, Santa Barbara in 1955. He then went to the University of California, Los Angeles where he earned a Ph.D. in history in 1961 (his doctoral dissertation, entitled "The Scholarship of Plutarch: the Biographer's Contribution to the Study of Athenian History, 480-429 B.C.," was directed by Truesdell Sparhawk Brown).

== Academic career ==
After teaching at the University of California, Riverside, and Hunter College, Frost was called to the growing History Department of the University of California, Santa Barbara in 1965 where he joined C. Warren Hollister in building its European history program.

Frost's first book was an English edition, with additional commentary and supplementary material, of Adolf Bauer's German-language Themistokles: Studien und Beiträge zur griechischen Historiographie und Quellenkunde (Merseburg: P. Steffenhagen, 1881) published as Themistokles: literary, epigraphical and archaeological testimonia (Chicago, Argonaut, 1967). He edited Democracy and the Athenians: Aspects of Ancient Politics (New York: Wiley, 1969), which provides a mix of excerpts from primary and secondary sources. He published his revised doctoral dissertation as Plutarch's Themistocles: A Historical Commentary (Princeton: Princeton University Press, 1980). His textbook Greek Society (originally published with D.C. Heath in 1971) was widely used and went through five editions. He published a collection of his essays in Politics and the Athenians: Essays on Athenian History and Historiography (Toronto: Edgar Kent, 2005).

Frost also was an active archaeologist with special interest in underwater archaeology. He mapped submerged remains of the ancient city of Halieis, near the modern community of Porto Cheli (in the Argolid Peninsula, Greece) in 1965. He also did survey work at Phourkari (also in the Argolid). He excavated in Greece in the 1960s, 1970s, and 1980s. Combining his interest in archaeology with the history of sea-faring, he also published on early sea-faring off the coast of California. Later, he co-directed the Greek-American excavations at Phalasarna (in Western Crete) with Dr. Elpida Hadjidaki of the Greek Archaeological Service.

In 2000, two of his former students co-edited The Dance of Hippocleides: A Festschrift for Frank J. Frost in his honor.

== Political career and other activities ==
Frost was also active in politics. He was elected County Supervisor of Santa Barbara County in 1972 on a no-growth platform (and was involved in a sting operation to stop bribes by real estate developers). He was the democratic nominee for Congress for the 19th congressional district in 1982, losing to Republican Robert J. Lagomarsino.

Following his retirement from teaching in 1990 (and receiving emeritus status), Frost was an active writer of fiction. These works included collections of short stories such as Subversives (Daniel & Daniel Publishers, 2001) and Gershwin's Last Waltz and Other Stories (Outskirts Press, 2016) as well as novels such as Dead Philadelphians (Capra Press, 1999), which received excellent reviews, and Bay to Breakers (Daniel & Daniel Publishers, 2002).

He also played jazz piano professionally for decades.

== Death ==
Frost died on January 9, 2026, at the age of 96.

== Selected publications ==
- Frank J. Frost, ed. and tr., Themistokles: Literary, Epigraphical and Archaeological Testimonia (Chicago, Argonaut, 1967)
- Frank J. Frost, Democracy and the Athenians: Aspects of Ancient Politics (New York: Wiley, 1969)
- Frank J. Frost, Greek Society, 1st edition (Lexington, MA: D.C. Heath, 1971). This book would go on through 5 editions
- Frank J. Frost, Plutarch's Themistocles: A Historical Commentary (Princeton: Princeton University Press, 1980)
- Frank J. Frost, et al., The Archaeology of Athens and Attica under the Democracy (Oxford: Oxbow Books, 1994)
- Frank J. Frost, Politics and the Athenians: Essays on Athenian History and Historiography (Toronto: Edgar Kent, 2005).
