= Rachel Ehrenfeld =

American political commentator

Rachel Ehrenfeld is an American political commentator on terrorism and corruption-related topics, and serves as director of a conservative think tank, the American Center for Democracy, and its Economic Warfare Institute.

Ehrenfield was the subject of a prominent libel case in the United Kingdom over claims made in one of her books that she lost by default after refusing to appear in court. The case led to secondary rulings in several US jurisdictions that libel rulings in foreign jurisdictions did not apply where the standard for defamation was not met under US law.

== Career ==
Ehrenfeld was a visiting scholar at Columbia University's Institute of War and Peace Studies, a research scholar at New York University School of Law, and a fellow at Johns Hopkins SAIS. Her Ph.D., in criminology, is from the Hebrew University School of Law.

=== Rachel's Law and free speech legislation ===
Ehrenfeld became involved in an international legal controversy when she was sued for libel in the United Kingdom. She was represented by a British lawyer Trevor Asserson.

In her book, Funding Evil, Ehrenfeld alleged that Saudi billionaire Khalid bin Mahfouz had financed al-Qaeda through his bank and the charitable organization. Mahfouz denied the allegations. Ehrenfeld, a U.S. citizen based in New York, had not written or marketed her book internationally and refused to acknowledge the jurisdiction of the British court over her case. Her refusal resulted in the British Court awarding a default judgment against her.

Represented by her attorney, Daniel Kornstein, Ehrenfeld pre-emptively countersued Mahfouz in New York to obtain a declaration that the judgment would not be enforced in the United States and that her book was not defamatory under United States defamation law. When the New York courts ruled that they lacked personal jurisdiction over Mahfouz, the New York State legislature took immediate action and unanimously passed the Libel Terrorism Protection Act (also known as "Rachel's Law"). Rachel's Law was signed into law on April 29, 2008. The law "offers New Yorkers greater protection against libel judgments in countries whose laws are inconsistent with the freedom of speech granted by the United States Constitution."

As of July 2010, six other states have passed analogs to Rachel's Law: Illinois, Florida, California, Tennessee, Maryland, and Utah.

A federal bill based on Rachel's Law was passed unanimously out of the Judiciary Committee and has since then been approved by both Houses of Congress. President Obama signed the bill into law on 10 August 2010. The bill, S. 3518, titled Securing and Protecting our Enduring and Established Constitutional Heritage Act (Speech Act).

Ehrenfeld's efforts at libel law reform in the United States inspired the Libel Reform Campaign an NGO campaign with over 55,000 supporters.

== Books ==
- The Soros Agenda, (Republic Book Publishers, 2023)
- Funding Evil; How Terrorism is Financed and How to Stop It, (Bonus Books, 2003, 2005)
- Evil Money, Encounters Along the Money Trail (HarperCollins in 1992, SPI, 1994)
- Narco-Terrorism; How Governments around the World used the Drug Trade to Finance and Further Terrorist Activities (Basic Books, 1990 & 1992)
