= Leonard Marsak =

American scholar

Leonard Marsak (1924–2013) was a scholar of modern European history, especially intellectual history.

== Biography ==
After military service during World War II, Marsak earned his B.S. in Literature at Cornell University in 1948, (and studied for a semester at the University of Paris in the Spring of 1947). He became the first Jewish graduate student in History at Cornell University and earned his M.A. in History at Cornell in 1949. While writing his dissertation under the direction of Henry Guerlac at Cornell, Marsak accepted a position as Instructor of History and the Humanities at Reed College in Portland, Oregon in 1953. While teaching at Reed College in 1954, Marsak was questioned before the House Un-American Activities Committee, where he respectfully declined to answer on the grounds of the 1st and 5th Amendments of the United States Constitution. While having some trouble finding another position, Marsak finished his Ph.D. in History at Cornell University in 1957, with a dissertation on the French philosopher Bernard le Bovier de Fontenelle. He was eventually hired in 1960 by the History Department at Rice University, where he taught for some years before being hired as an Associate Professor in the History Department at the University of California, Santa Barbara in 1965, where he joined Joachim Remak and C. Warren Hollister in building a strong European history program. Professor Marsak published widely on Modern European Intellectual History in books, articles, and reviews. His article “Cartesianism in Fontenelle and French Science, 1686-1752,” (published in the journal Isis in 1959) established his reputation as a scholar of the history of science. He followed this with Bernard de Fontenelle: The Idea of Science in the French Enlightenment in 1959 (a revision of his doctoral dissertation). Although he continued to publish scholarly articles and reviews, Marsak reached his widest audience with a series of edited works with major publishers over the next several years, including: French Philosophers: From Descartes to Sartre (New York: Meridian, 1961); The Rise of Science in Relation to Society (New York: Macmillan, 1964); The Achievement of Bernard le Bovier de Fontenelle (New York: Johnson Reprint, 1970); The Enlightenment (New York: John Wiley and Sons, 1972); and The Nature of Historical Inquiry (New York: Holt, Rinehart, and Winston, 1970). Marsak was a popular and reflective classroom instructor.

== Personal ==
He and his wife Ann Marsak (a scholar in her own right, as well as an environmental activist) also collected extensively in Asian Art. Leonard Marsak retired from the University of California, Santa Barbara and was granted emeritus status in 1986. Professor Marsak died on February 4, 2013. His sons are Nathan Marsak, the architectural and cultural historian, and Carl Marsak, a leading expert on the enneagram.

== Selected publications ==
- Leonard Marsak, “Cartesianism in Fontenelle and French Science, 1686-1752,” Isis 50 (1959): 51-60.
- Leonard Marsak, Bernard de Fontenelle: The Idea of Science in the French Enlightenment (Philadelphia: Transactions of the American Philosophical Society, 1959).
- Leonard Marsak, ed., French Philosophers: From Descartes to Sartre (New York: Meridian, 1961).
- Leonard Marsak, ed., The Rise of Science in Relation to Society (New York: Macmillan, 1964).
- Leonard Marsak, “Science and the Public Mind: Some Early Popularizers of Science,” Cahiers d'historie mondiale 10 (1967): 512-18.
- Leonard Marsak, “The Idea of Reason in Seventeenth-Century France," Cahiers d'Histoire Mondiale 11 (1969): 407-416.
- Leonard Marsak, ed. and trans., The Achievement of Bernard le Bovier de Fontenelle (New York: Johnson Reprint, 1970).
- Leonard Marsak, ed., The Nature of Historical Inquiry (New York: Holt, Rinehart, and Winston: 1970).
- Leonard Marsak, ed., The Enlightenment (New York: John Wiley and Sons, 1972).
