= C. Warren Hollister =

American medieval historian (1930–1997)

Charles Warren Hollister (November 2, 1930 – September 14, 1997) was an American author and historian. He was one of the founding members of the University of California Santa Barbara history department. He specialized in English medieval history, especially studies that emphasized the interrelationship of England within the Anglo-Norman realm and the development of administrative kingship. His colleague Jeffrey Burton Russell called Hollister "one of the best medieval generalists in the world."

== Biography ==
Hollister was born in Los Angeles, California, the son of Nathan and Carrie (Cushman) Hollister. He graduated with honors from Harvard University in 1951, served in the United States Air Force during the Korean War, and received his Ph.D. from UCLA in 1958.

Hollister spent his academic career at the University of California, Santa Barbara, officially retiring in 1994. During his tenure the History Department at the University of California, Santa Barbara, expanded massively, with the hire of scholars such as Frank J. Frost, Joachim Remak, Leonard Marsak, and Alfred Gollin. He was elected as a fellow of the Medieval Academy of America in 1981 and was also a fellow of the Royal Historical Society and the Medieval Academy of Ireland. In May 1982, Hollister and his graduate students founded the Charles Homer Haskins Society, dedicated to the study of Viking, Anglo-Saxon, Anglo-Norman, and early Angevin history.

Hollister's research centered on the career of Henry I of England. However, his biography of that monarch was delayed by the loss of the manuscript, note cards and research library in the Santa Barbara wildfire of 1990. Hollister's Henry I biography was incomplete at the time of his death, but his doctoral student, Amanda Clark Frost, finished and published it with the Yale University Press in 2001.

== Publications ==
- "King John and the Historians", Journal of British Studies 1#1 (1961), pp. 1–19 online
- Anglo-Saxon Military Institutions on the Eve of the Norman Conquest, 1962 (Triennial Book Prize of the Conference on British Studies)
- Medieval Europe: A Short History, 1964
- The Military Organization of Norman England, 1965
- A History of England, Volume I: The Making of England, 55 B.C.–1399, 1966
- Roots of the Western Tradition: A Short History of the Ancient World, 1966
- (With John L. Stipp and Alan Dirrum) The Rise and Development of Western Civilization, 1967
- (Editor) The Impact of the Norman Conquest, 1969
- (With Judith Pike) The Moons of Meer (juvenile fantasy), 1969
- Odysseus to Columbus: A Synopsis of Classical and Medieval History, 1974
- Monarchy, Magnates and Institutions in the Anglo-Norman World, 1986
- (With J. Sears McGee and Gale Stokes) The West Transformed: A History of Western Civilization, 2000
- Henry I (edited and completed by Amanda Clark Frost), 2001
