= Wilbur Jacobs =

American historian (1918–1998)

- Born: Wilbur R. Jacobs; June 30, 1918; Chicago, Illinois, U.S.
- Died: June 14, 1998 (aged 79); Pasadena, California, U.S.
- Education: Pasadena City College; University of California, Los Angeles (BA, MA)
- Occupation: Historian

Wilbur R. Jacobs (June 30, 1918 – June 15, 1998) was an American historian, with a special interest in Native American, Western, and Environmental history.

Born in Chicago, Illinois, in 1918, Jacobs moved west at a young age and settled in the Los Angeles area. He started college at Pasadena City College, then earned his B.A. (1940) and M.A. (1942) in History at the University of California, Los Angeles. After military service during World War II, Jacobs started doctoral study at Johns Hopkins University, but decided to return to UCLA to pursue Western Frontier history under the direction of Lewis Knott Koontz. He finished his doctorate in 1947 and then taught Western Civilization at Stanford University for two years, before accepting a call to the History program at the University of California, Santa Barbara (known at that time as the University of California, Santa Barbara College). At the University of California, Santa Barbara, Jacobs served as a founding member of the History Department and also served as department chair from 1961 to 1964.

Jacobs revised his doctoral dissertation, which had won a prize from the Pacific Coast Branch of the American Historical Association, and published it as Diplomacy and the Indian Gifts: Anglo-French Rivalry among the Ohio and Northwest Frontiers, 1748-1763 (Stanford: Stanford University Press, 1950). Jacobs’ interest in frontier history continued with his edited book The Appalachian Indian Frontier: The Edmond Atkin Report and Plan of 1755 (Columbia, SC: The University of South Carolina Press, 1954). His interest in Western history continued with his edited collection of Letters of Francis Parkman, 2 vols. (Norman, 1960), which was a runner-up for the Pulitzer Prize in History. His interest in the historiography of the history of the American frontier, influenced by the work of Frederick Jackson Turner, led to him publishing several works, including: Frederick Jackson Turner's Legacy: Unpublished Writings in American History (San Marino: The Huntingdon Library, 1965); The Historical World of Frederick Jackson Turner With Selections from his Correspondence (New Haven: Yale University Press, 1968); and "Turner's Methodology: Multiple Working Hypotheses or Ruling Theory?" Journal of American History 54 (1968): 853–863. He developed his interest in Native American History further with his book Dispossessing the American Indian: Indians and Whites on the Colonial Frontier (New York: Scribner, 1972, second edition 1985) as well as his article "The Tip of an Iceberg: Pre-Columbian Indian Demography and some Implications for Revisionism," William and Mary Quarterly, 3rd series, 31 (1974): 123–132. Jacobs was recognized for his scholarship by being selected “Faculty Research Lecturer” at the University of California, Santa Barbara in 1956. He was also elected President of the Pacific Coast Branch of the American Historical Association in 1976 and won the Western Historical Association's Award of Merit for a “lifetime of revisionism.”

After his retirement in 1988, Jacobs conducted research at the Huntington Library in San Marino, California and published On Turner's Trail: One Hundred Years of Writing Western History (Lawrence: University of Kansas Press, 1994) and The Fatal Confrontation: Historical Studies of American Indians, Environment and Historians (Albuquerque: The University of New Mexico Press, 1996). On June 15, 1998, Professor Jacobs was killed in a car accident in Pasadena.

== Selected publications ==
- Wilbur R. Jacobs, Diplomacy and the Indian Gifts: Anglo-French Rivalry among the Ohio and Northwest Frontiers, 1748-1763 (Stanford: Stanford University Press, 1950, reprinted in 1966).
- Wilbur R. Jacobs, ed., Indians of the southern colonial frontier: The Edmond Atkin Report and Plan of 1755 (Columbia, SC: The University of South Carolina Press, 1954) [reprinted as The Appalachian Indian Frontier: The Edmond Atkin Report and Plan of 1755 (Lincoln: The University of Nebraska Press, 1967)
- Wilbur R. Jacobs, ed., Letters of Francis Parkman, 2 vols. (Norman, 1960).
- Wilbur R. Jacobs, ed., Frederick Jackson Turner's Legacy: Unpublished Writings in American History (San Marino: The Huntingdon Library, 1965).
- Wilbur R. Jacobs (co-authored), Turner, Bolton, and Webb; three historians of the American frontier (Seattle, University of Washington Press, 1965).
- Wilbur R. Jacobs, The Paxton Riots and the Frontier Theory (Chicago: Rand McNally, 1967).
- Wilbur R. Jacobs, The Historical World of Frederick Jackson Turner With Selections from his Correspondence (New Haven: Yale University Press, 1968).
- Wilbur R. Jacobs, "Turner's Methodology: Multiple Working Hypotheses or Ruling Theory?" Journal of American History 54 (1968): 853–863.
- Wilbur R. Jacobs, Dispossessing the American Indian: Indians and Whites on the Colonial Frontier (New York: Scribner, 1972).
- Wilbur R. Jacobs, "The Tip of an Iceberg: Pre-Columbian Indian Demography and some Implications for Revisionism," William and Mary Quarterly, 3rd series, 31 (1974): 123–132.
- Wilbur R. Jacobs, ed., Benjamin Franklin: Statesman or Materialist (New York, Holt, Rinehart, and Winston, 1976).
- Wilbur R. Jacobs, On Turner's Trail: One Hundred Years of Writing Western History (Lawrence: University of Kansas Press, 1994).
- Wilbur R. Jacobs, The Fatal Confrontation: Historical Studies of American Indians, Environment and Historians (Albuquerque: The University of New Mexico Press, 1996).
