= Joachim Remak =

American historian (1920–2001)

- Born: 1920; Berlin, Germany
- Died: June 16, 2001 (aged 80–81); Santa Barbara, California, U.S.
- Education: University of California, Berkeley (BA, MA); Stanford University (PhD)
- Occupation: Historian

Joachim Remak (1920 Berlin – Santa Barbara, Cal., 2001) was an American historian of Modern Europe, especially of Germany and World War I.

Born in Berlin, Germany, he fled Nazi Germany in 1938 for the United States. He earned his B.A. and M.A. in history at the University of California, Berkeley, in 1942 and 1946. He worked for the State Department in Germany and the United Kingdom and then returned to the United States for doctoral study and earned his Ph.D. in history at Stanford University in 1955; his dissertation dealt with "Germany and the United States, 1933–1939." He married Roberta Anne Remak (a 1946 graduate of Stanford) in 1948.

He taught at Stanford as an Instructor for three years and then took up a tenure-track position in the History Department at Lewis and Clark College in Portland, Oregon, in 1958. He gained tenure there and served as department chair before being called to the growing History Department at the University of California, Santa Barbara in 1965. The next year he was awarded a Guggenheim Fellowship. A popular classroom lecturer as well as a prolific scholar, Joe Remak was promoted to Full Professor and served as department chair at the University of California, Santa Barbara, from 1977 to 1984.

He published his first book, Sarajevo, the Story of a Political Murder (Criterion Books), in 1959 (and the book won the Borden Award from Stanford University's Hoover Institution in 1960). His published his next book, The Gentle Critic: Theodor Fontane and German Politics, 1848–1898 (Syracuse University Press), in 1964. His article “The Healthy Invalid: How Doomed the Habsburg Empire?” which appeared in The Journal of Modern History 41 (1969): 127-143 won the American Historical Association's Higby Prize. His article "1914—The Third Balkan War: Origins Reconsidered," The Journal of Modern History 43 (1971): 353–366, offered a revisionist historiographic analysis of the origins of World War I. Remak also published several textbooks, including: The Origins of World War I, 1871–1914 (Holt, Rinehart, and Wilson, 1967), The Nazi Years: A Documentary History (Simon and Schuster, 1969), The First World War: Causes, Conduct, Consequences (J. Wiley & Sons, 1971), and The Origins of the Second World War (Prentice Hall, 1976).

Remak edited War, Revolution and Peace (University Press of America, 1987) and co-edited Another Germany: A Reconsideration of the Imperial Era (Westview Press, 1988). His last book was entitled A Very Civil War (Westview Press, 1992) and analyzed the Swiss Sonderbund War of 1847.

Professor Remak died on June 16, 2001.

== Publications ==
- Sarajevo, the Story of a Political Murder (Criterion Books, 1959).
- The Gentle Critic: Theodor Fontane and German Politics, 1848–1898 (Syracuse University Press, 1964).
- “The Healthy Invalid: How Doomed the Habsburg Empire?” The Journal of Modern History 41 (1969): 127–143.
- "1914—The Third Balkan War: Origins Reconsidered," The Journal of Modern History 43 (1971): 353–366.
- The Origins of World War I, 1871-1914 (Holt, Rinehart, and Wilson, 1967).
- (ed.), The Nazi Years: A Documentary History (Simon and Schuster, 1969).
- The First World War: Causes, Conduct, Consequences (J. Wiley & Sons, 1971).
- The Origins of the Second World War (Prentice Hall, 1976).
- (ed.), War, Revolution and Peace (University Press of America, 1987).
- (co-edited with Jack Dukes), Another Germany: A Reconsideration of the Imperial Era (Westview Press, 1988).
- A Very Civil War (Westview Press, 1992).
