= Brayley =

Brayley may refer to:

- Bertie Brayley (b. 1981), English football player.
- Desmond Brayley, Baron Brayley (1917-1977), British Army officer, businessman and briefly Government minister.
- Edward Wedlake Brayley (1773–1854), English antiquary and topographer
- Edward William Brayley (1801–1870), British geographer, librarian, and science writer; son of Edward Wedlake Brayley.
- John Desmond Brayley (1917–1977), British Army officer, businessman, and government minister.
- Brayley, a lunar crater named after Edward William Brayley.
