= 1839 in the United Kingdom =

Events from the year 1839 in the United Kingdom.

== Incumbents ==
- Monarch – Victoria
- Prime Minister – William Lamb, 2nd Viscount Melbourne (Whig)
- Foreign Secretary – Henry John Temple, 3rd Viscount Palmerston
- Home Secretary – Lord John Russell (until 30 August) Constantine Phipps, 1st Marquess of Normanby (from 30 August)

== Events ==
- January – The first parallax measurement of the distance to Alpha Centauri is published by Thomas Henderson.
- 19 January – British East India Company captures Aden.
- 25 January – H. Fox Talbot shows his "photogenic drawings" at the Royal Institution in London. Sara Anne Bright is also producing such photographic reproductions this year.
- 29 January – Naturalist Charles Darwin marries his cousin Emma Wedgwood at Maer, Staffordshire.
- February – Report on the Affairs of British North America published.
- 26 February – The first nationally recognised Grand National is run, at Aintree. It is won by Jem Mason riding Lottery.
- 1 March – Sussex County Cricket Club, England's oldest county club, is formed.
- 26 March – The first Henley Royal Regatta is held on the River Thames.
- 9 April – The world's first commercial electric telegraph line comes into operation alongside the Great Western Railway line from London Paddington station to West Drayton.
- 19 April – The Treaty of London establishes Belgium as a kingdom with its independence and neutrality guaranteed by Britain and the other great powers of Europe.
- May
  - J. M. W. Turner completes his painting The Fighting Temeraire.
  - Cambridge Camden Society established by John Mason Neale, Alexander Beresford Hope and Benjamin Webb to promote Gothic architecture.
- 1 May – The start of Eyre's expeditions to the interior of South Australia.
- 7–11 May – Bedchamber Crisis: Robert Peel asks that Queen Victoria dismiss her Ladies of the Bedchamber as a condition for his forming a government. Victoria refuses to accept the condition and Melbourne is persuaded to stay on as Prime Minister.
- 13 May – First Rebecca Riots targeted against Welsh turnpikes, at Efailwen in Carmarthenshire.
- 31 May – Important British constitutional case of Stockdale v Hansard is launched when publisher John Joseph Stockdale sues for libel after John Roberton's pseudo-medical work On Diseases of the Generative System (1811) is declared in a parliamentary report to be indecent.
- 3 June – Destruction of opium at Humen begins, casus belli for Britain to open the 3-year First Opium War against Qing dynasty China.
- 28 June – Coal mine explosion at St Hilda pit, South Shields, kills 51.
- July – The first Royal Show (agricultural show) is held in Oxford.
- 4 July – Chartists riot in Birmingham.
- 15 July – The first clipper ship is launched in Britain, the schooner Scottish Maid at Alexander Hall's yard in Aberdeen.
- 23 July – British forces under Sir John Keane capture the fortress city of Ghazni, Afghanistan in the Battle of Ghazni during the First Anglo-Afghan War.
- 17 August – Custody of Infants Act (based largely on campaigning by Caroline Norton) permits limited rights of custody of young children to divorced mothers.
- 23 August – British forces seize Hong Kong as a base, as Britain prepares to wage the First Opium War.
- 27 August – County Police Act enables the appointment of police in rural areas. On 28 November, Wiltshire becomes the first county to appoint a chief constable under the act. Also this year, City of London Police Act confirms establishment of a force in the City.
- 30 August – The Eglinton Tournament, a recreation of a medieval tourney, takes place at Eglinton Castle, North Ayrshire, Scotland.
- 5 October – James Clark Ross sets out on the Antarctic expedition of HMS Erebus and HMS Terror which will chart much of the coastline of the continent.
- 19 October – George Bradshaw publishes the first national railway timetable, Bradshaw's Railway Time Tables and Assistant to Railway Travelling, in Manchester.
- 4 November – Newport Rising: between 5,000 and 10,000 Chartist sympathisers led by John Frost, many of them coal miners, march on Newport, Monmouthshire, to liberate Chartist prisoners; around 22 are killed when troops, directed by Thomas Phillips, the mayor, fire on the crowd. This is the last large-scale armed civil rebellion against authority in mainland Britain and sees the most deaths.
- 23 November – Launch of the first British ocean-going iron warship, Nemesis for the East India Company, by William Laird at Birkenhead.
- December – New Committee of Council on education sets up a new national system of Inspectors of Schools for grant-aided establishments.
- 5 December – Uniform Fourpenny Post introduced, a major postal reform, whereby 4d is levied for pre-paid letters up to half an ounce in weight instead of postage being calculated by distance and number of sheets of paper.
- 24 December – An enormous landslide occurs at Axmouth in Devon, creating the Axmouth to Lyme Regis Undercliff. A report by geologists William Daniel Conybeare and William Buckland is one of the earliest scientific descriptions of such an event.

=== Undated ===
- Sisters of Mercy establish the first native Roman Catholic convent in England since the Reformation, at Bermondsey in London.
- Michael Faraday publishes Experimental Researches in Electricity clarifying the true nature of electricity.
- Claimed invention of the rear-wheel driven bicycle by Kirkpatrick Macmillan in Scotland.
- Summer – John Ruskin visits Cornwall, regretting that reading for his Oxford degree interferes with his study of basalt at St Michael's Mount.

=== Ongoing ===
- Smallpox epidemic of 1837–40.

== Publications ==
- Philip James Bailey's (anonymous) poem Festus.
- Charles Darwin's Journal of Researches into the Geology and Natural History of the Various Countries Visited by H.M.S. Beagle under the Command of Captain FitzRoy, R.N., from 1832 to 1839.
- Mrs William Ellis's conduct book The Women of England: their social duties and domestic habits.

== Births ==
- 7 January – Ouida (Maria Louise Ramé), novelist (died 1908)
- 16 March – John Butler Yeats, Irish painter (died 1922)
- 17 June – Arthur Tooth, Anglican clergyman prosecuted for Ritualist practices in the 1870s (died 1931)
- 18 July – James Surtees Phillpotts, educationalist (died 1930)
- 4 August – Walter Pater, essayist and critic (died 1894)
- 19 September – George Cadbury, businessman (died 1922)
- 7 December – Redvers Buller, general, Victoria Cross recipient (died 1908)
- 22 December – John Nevil Maskelyne, stage magician (died 1917)

== Deaths ==
- 16 January – Edmund Lodge, writer (born 1756)
- 28 January – Sir William Beechey, portrait painter (born 1753)
- 11 April – John Galt, novelist (born 1779)
- 22 April – Thomas Haynes Bayly, poet (died 1839)
- 17 May – Archibald Alison, author (born 1757)
- 15 July – Winthrop Mackworth Praed, politician and poet (born 1802)
- 28 August – William Smith, geologist (born 1769)
- 24 October – Sir William Charles Ellis, physician specialising in mental illness (born 1780)
- 15 November – William Murdoch, inventor (born 1754)
- 24 December – James Smith, author (born 1775)
