= Edward Brayley =

Edward Brayley may refer to:

- Edward William Brayley (1801–1870), English geographer, librarian, and science author
- Edward Wedlake Brayley (1773–1854), English antiquary and topographer
