= Arnaud Berquin =

French children's author

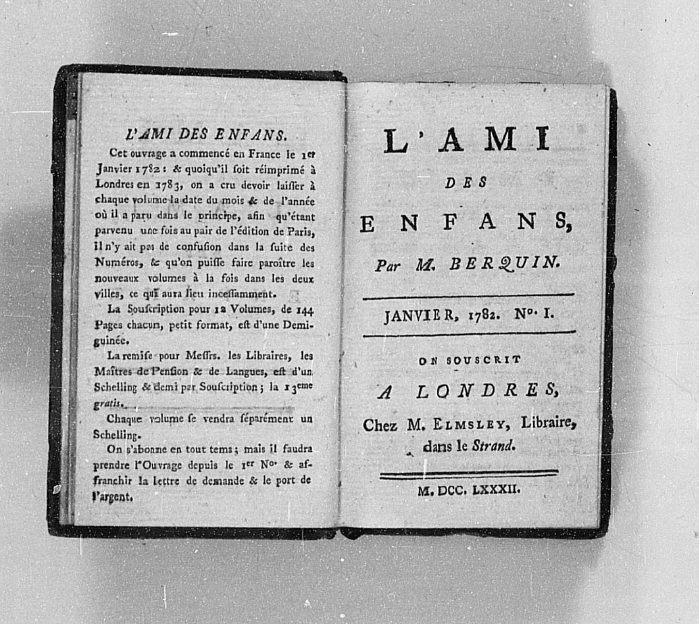
Title page from L'Ami des Enfans (1782)

Arnaud Berquin (September 1747 in Bordeaux – 21 December 1791) was a French children's author.

== Works ==
His most famous work was L'Ami des Enfants (1782-1783) which was first translated into English, albeit bowdlerised, by Mary Stockdale and published in London The Looking-glass for the Mind, Or, Intellectual Mirror: Being an Elegant Collection of the Most Delightful Little Stories and Interesting Tales in 1783-1784 by Mary's father John Stockdale.

The work remained popular until the middle of the nineteenth century. Berquin's stories consisted of events that might happen to children in their everyday lives—they did not contain fairy tales or other imaginative literature. His books envision childhood reading as a familial exercise; for example, some of his "stories" are actually plays with parts for every member of the family. Berquin's books helped solidify the creation of the nuclear family, for "if Berquin's work has a theme, it is that parents and children live in a perfect symbiosis, the parents looking after their children's interests and the children, if behaving properly, filling their parents with joy."
