= Joseph Nightingale =

English writer and preacher

Joseph Nightingale (26 October 1775 – 9 August 1824) was a prolific English writer and preacher. He was particularly noted for his topographic writing and his interest in shorthand.

== Life ==
He was born at Chowbent in Atherton, Lancashire and became a Wesleyan Methodist in 1796. He acted occasionally as a local preacher, but never entered the Methodist ministry, and ceased to be a member in 1804. For some time he was master of a school at Macclesfield, Cheshire, but moved to London in 1805, at the suggestion of William Smyth. By this time he was a Unitarian. He became a Unitarian minister, preaching his first sermon on 8 June 1806 at Parliament Street Chapel, Bishopsgate, but he never held any pastoral charge, and supported himself chiefly by writing. He contributed frequently to early volumes of the Monthly Repository. After the publication of his Portraiture of Methodism (1807) he was exposed to much criticism. An article in the New Annual Register for 1807 characterised him as "a knave" and he brought an action for libel against John Stockdale, the publisher, recovering £200 in damages on 11 March 1809. In 1824 he was again received into membership by the Methodist body.

== Private life ==
He married Margaret Goostry on 17 November 1799 and they had four children. His son, Joseph Sargent Nightingale, became an independent minister. In private life "he was of a kind disposition, lively imagination, and possessed a cheerfulness that never deserted him." He died in London and was buried at Bunhill Fields.

== Works ==
Charles Sutton, the author of the Dictionary of National Biography article on Nightingale, states that "His works extend to about fifty volumes; those on topography have much merit." Among them are:

- Elagnitin, J. [J. Nightingale] (1822) Mock Heroics on Snuff, Tobacco, and Gin;
- Nightingale, J. (1797) Elegiac Thoughts on the Death of Rev. David Simpson, Manchester;
- — (1804) The Election, a Satirical Drama, Stockport;
- — (1807) A Portraiture of Methodism;
- — (1809) Nightingale versus Stockdale;
- — (1811a) A Guide to the Watering Places;
- — (1811b) A Letter to a Friend, containing a Comparative View of the Two Systems of Shorthand, respectively invented by Mr. Byrom and Dr. Mavor;
- — (1812) A Portraiture of the Roman Catholic Religion;
- — (1813) Accounts of the Counties of Stafford, Somerset, and Salop, 3 vols., forming a continuation of The Beauties of England and Wales by Edward Wedlake Brayley;
- — (1814–1815) Surveys of the City of London and the City of Westminster, 4 vols
  - Joseph Nightingale (1815). London and Middlesex: v.3, part 2 ... History and Description of the City and Liberty of Westminster. Beauties of England and Wales, v.10. London: J. Harris.
- — (1816a) English Topography, consisting of Accounts of the several Counties of England and Wales;
- — (1816b) The Bazaar, its Origin, Nature, &c., considered as a Branch of Political Economy;
- — (1818) History and Antiquities of the Parochial Church of Saviour, Southwark;
- — (1820–1822) Memoirs of Caroline, Queen of England, 3 vols;
- — (1821a) An Historical Account of Kenilworth Castle;
- — (1821b) The Religions and Religious Ceremonies of all Nations faithfully and impartially described;
- — (1822a) Trial of Queen Caroline, 3 vols;
- — (1822b) An Impartial View of the Life and Administration of the late Marquis of Londonderry;
- — (1822c) The Ladies' Grammar;
- — (1822c) Rational Stenography, or Shorthand made Easy ... founded on ... Byrom,;
- — Historical Details and Tracts concerning the Storekeeper-General's Office;
- — The Portable Cyclopædia;
- — Report of the Trial of Thistlewood;
- — The Political Repository and Magazine;
- — A Natural History of British Singing Birds;
- — The Juvenile Muse, original Stories in Verse;
- — A Grammar of Christian Theology.
