= Laying on the table =

Laying on the table may refer to:

- Table (parliamentary procedure), laying a motion on the table
- Laying before the house, laying a document on the table
