= Thomas Curson Hansard =

British printer (1776–1833)

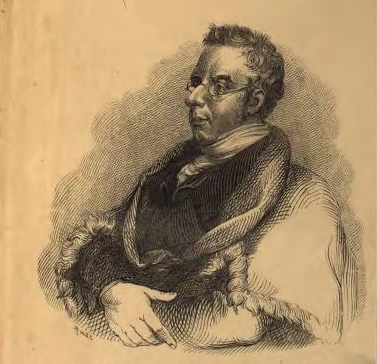
An 1825 portrait of Hansard published in Typographia, an Historical Sketch of the Origin and Progress of the Art of Printing

Thomas Curson Hansard (6 November 1776 – 5 May 1833) was an English pressman, son of the printer Luke Hansard.

== Early life and education ==
Hansard was born in Clerkenwell, currently within the borders of London but at the time part of Finsbury division, Ossulstone, Middlesex.

== Career ==
In 1803, he established a press of his own in Paternoster Row. In the same year, William Cobbett, a newspaperman, began to print the Parliamentary Debates. At first, these were not independent reports, but were taken from newspapers' accounts of parliamentary debate.

In 1809, Hansard started to print Cobbett's reports. Together, they also published a pamphlet describing an incident in which German mercenaries had flogged British soldiers for mutiny; as a result Hansard was imprisoned on 9 July 1810 in King's Bench Prison for libel. In 1812, facing bankruptcy, Cobbett sold the publication to Hansard, who continued to publish it for the rest of his life. In 1829, he added his own name to the parliamentary proceedings, giving it the title Hansard that it bears to this day.

Hansard was the author of Typographia, an Historical Sketch of the Origin and Progress of the Art of Printing, published in 1825.

== Death ==
Hansard died in 1833 on New Bridge Street in Blackfriars, London.

== Firm ==
The original business remained in the hands of his younger brothers, James and Luke Graves Hansard (1777–1851). The firm was prosecuted in 1837 by John Joseph Stockdale for printing by order of the House of Commons, in an official report of the inspector of prisons, statements regarded by the plaintiff as libellous. Hansard's sheltered itself on the ground of parliamentary privilege, but it was not until after much litigation that the security of the printers of government reports was guaranteed by statute in 1840.

After 1889, the debates were published by the Hansard Publishing Union Limited.
