= Stockdale v Hansard =

1839 UK parliamentary privilege case

Stockdale v. Hansard
- Court: Queen's Bench
- Full case name: John Joseph Stockdale v. James Hansard, Luke Graves Hansard, Luke James Hansard, and Luke Henry Hansard
- Decided: 31 May 1839
- Citations: (1839) 9 Ad & Ell 96; 112 ER 1112; [1839] EWHC QB J21
- Transcript: Transcript of judgment at bailii.org

Case history
- Prior action: Stockdale v. Hansard (1837) 3 St. Tr. (N.S.) 723
- Subsequent action: —

Court membership
- Judges sitting: Lord Denman, Lord Chief Justice of Queen's Bench; Mr Justice Littledale; Mr Justice Patteson; Mr Justice Coleridge

Case opinions
- Denman CJ; Littledale, Patteson and Coleridge JJ

Stockdale v Hansard (1839) 9 Ad & El 1 is a United Kingdom constitutional law case in which the Parliament of the United Kingdom unsuccessfully challenged the common law of parliamentary privilege, leading to legislative reform.

A publisher, John Stockdale, claimed that he had been libelled in a report about Newgate Prison which had been ordered by the Prisons Act 1835 and printed by Hansard. The report said that a book published by Stockdale and found in a prisoner's cell contained obscene illustrations. Various court cases ended up with a ruling that parliamentary privilege did not apply, and Stockdale was awarded damages. Law officers acting for the Court of Queen's Bench seized goods from Hansards' premises to defray the damages and sold them. The House of Commons in turn claimed that the Sheriffs and bailiffs were in contempt and in breach of privilege, had them arrested and they were imprisoned in Newgate jail where the trouble had originally started.

There was a distinct possibility that the Court could then have had the Serjeant at Arms of the House of Commons who arrested the Sheriffs detained himself; the Commons would then have been obliged to have the learned judges thrown in gaol to assert its supremacy over the common law, the Army called in... The Great Reform Act of 1832 had only recently been passed, bringing with it a wholesale re-interpretation of parliamentary practice. The case of Stockdale v Hansard raised a number of questions about constitutional precedence in Britain. Where does the ultimate authority lie? In the Crown, via Parliament; through the Law Courts; or in the will of the recently-enfranchised populace?

The Commons finally established the ascendancy of its privilege with the Parliamentary Papers Act 1840.

== Facts ==
Bill by Stockdale advertising works by Roberton

The Prisons Act 1835 had introduced the first national prison system in Great Britain, along with a regime of prison inspections. Rev. Whitworth Russell, vicar of Chiddingly, was one of the first inspectors and had been the reforming champion of the austere regime at the Millbank penitentiary.

In Newgate prison, Russell and his fellow inspector, William Crawford, had discovered an illustrated book published in 1827 entitled The Generative System of John Roberton. This was the fifth edition of On Diseases of the Generative System, a book on reproductive system diseases by John Roberton. Roberton's book was mentioned in Russell and Crawford's description of Ward no. 10 in Chapel Yard:

We also found several books: amongst them Guthrie's Grammar, a song book, the Keepsake Annual for 1836, and the ⸺ ⸺ by ⸺ ⸺, 18 plates, published by Stockdale, 1827. This last is a book of a most disgusting nature, and the plates are obscene and indecent in the extreme. It was claimed as his property by a prisoner named ⸺, and was kept in the cupboard without any attempt at concealment.

This 1827 version was edited by 'Thomas Little', a pseudonym of John Joseph Stockdale, who had in fact been publishing the book since its first appearance in 1811. His editorial advertisement (p. vii) states that Roberton himself had revised and enlarged the work, and the extent of Stockdale's contribution was the additional six plates and some occasional typographical corrections.

Roberton was a radical and something of an outsider to the medical profession, and Stockdale's publications were often salacious or prurient. The 1827 edition had attracted some distaste on its publication for its explicit anatomical plates. As required by the 1835 Prisons Act, in March 1836 Russell and Crawford submitted their report on Newgate to the Home Secretary, who laid it before both the House of Commons and the House of Lords. The Commons (and later the Lords) then ordered the report to be printed.

Publication of such parliamentary papers for circulation solely among Members of Parliament (MPs) of the Commons, or peers of the Lords, was protected by absolute privilege under common law. (As of 2019 it remains so.) However, a further development from 1835 had resulted from MP Joseph Hume's campaign to make better use of the mass of parliamentary papers and to improve freedom of information by publishing parliamentary papers for sale to the general public. On that basis, Messrs Hansard, publishers of the eponymous parliamentary debates, who were contracted to print papers, made 200 copies of the Newgate report.

The Court of Aldermen of the City of London Corporation, who were responsible for Newgate, were incensed. They saw Roberton's book as a scientific work, but the inspectors affirmed their original description by observing, "We also applied to several medical booksellers, who all gave it the same character. They described it as 'one of Stockdale's obscene books'". Stockdale sued for £500 damages for libel, admitting that he had published the book but denying its obscenity. Stockdale sued as a pauper and Mr Justice Park assigned him counsel. Attorney-General Sir John Campbell appeared for Hansard. The first trial took place in 1837 before Lord Denman CJ, and a jury.

Denman dismissed Campbell's defence that the publication was privileged, and the jury had to consider only the defence that the published statement had been true and the book was indeed indecent. When they first returned, the jury foreman said that it found the book indecent and obscene but did not all agree that it was disgusting and that it wished to award Stockdale a farthing in damages. After a rebuke from Lord Denman on its faulty logic, the jury briefly conferred and found for Hansard.

Stockdale now found a copy of the City aldermen's response to the original report and sued again, but Hansard was ordered by the House to plead that he had acted under order of the Commons and was protected by parliamentary privilege.

== Judgment ==
The Commons claimed that:

1. The Commons was a court superior to any court of law;
2. Each House (Commons and Lords) was the sole judge of its own privileges;
3. A resolution of the House declaratory of its own privileges could not be questioned in any court of law.

The Court of the Queen's Bench was led by Lord Denman, who had had some support on the case from barrister Charles Rann Kennedy. The court held that only the Crown in both Houses of Parliament could make or unmake laws and no resolution of one house alone was beyond the control of law. Further, where it was necessary to establish the rights of those outside Parliament, the courts would decide the nature of privilege. The court found that the House held no privilege to order publication of defamatory material outside Parliament.

The court furthermore found that Hansard was not protected by privilege and awarded damages to Stockdale, HM Treasury defraying Hansard's costs. However, when the Sheriffs of London and Middlesex for 1839, William Evans and John Wheelton, attempted to enforce the court order, Hansard fell back upon parliament for protection.

In November 1839 the sheriffs of Middlesex proceeded to take action to recover from Hansard the damages that had been awarded. Bailiffs executed the sheriff’s writ to recover £618 from Hansard: they had entered his property, taken printing presses, and sold them to a timber merchant in Great Russell Street. It was a direct challenge to the decision of the Commons, which could not be ignored. Accordingly the sheriffs and other persons who sought to carry out the orders issued by the law court against the Hansards were arrested by Sir William Gosset, Serjeant at Arms, and imprisoned in Newgate by order of the House of Commons.

These "protracted and vexatious proceedings" were brought to a close only by the passing of the Parliamentary Papers Act 1840 by which it was enacted that proceedings, criminal or civil, against persons for the publication of papers printed by order of either house of parliament shall be stayed upon the production of a certificate to that effect. This established parliamentary privilege for publications under the House's authority. Stockdale was thus finally defeated, and the printer was indemnified.

== Bibliography ==
- Bradley, A.W. & Ewing, K.D. (2003). Constitutional and Administrative Law (13th ed.). London: Pearson. pp. 219–220. ISBN 0-582-43807-1.
- Loveland, I. (2000). Political Libels: A Comparative Study. London: Hart Publishing. pp. 21–22. ISBN 1-84113-115-6. (Google Books)
- McGrath, R. (2002). Seeing Her Sex: Medical Archives and the Female Body. Manchester: Manchester University Press. pp. Ch.2. ISBN 0-7190-4167-8. (Google Books)
- Stockdale, E. (1990). "The unnecessary crisis: The background to the Parliamentary Papers Act 1840". Public Law: 30–49.
- Select Committee on Publication of Printed Papers (8 May 1837), Report with the Minutes of Evidence, and Appendix, House of Commons sessional papers, vol. 1837 XIII (286) 97
- Crawford, William; Russell, Whitworth (2 May 1836), "I: First Report of the Inspectors for the Home District [Newgate]", Reports of the Inspectors Appointed to Visit the Different Prisons of Great Britain, House of Lords sessional papers, vol. 1836 X (79) 1
