= The Beauties of England and Wales =

Series of books

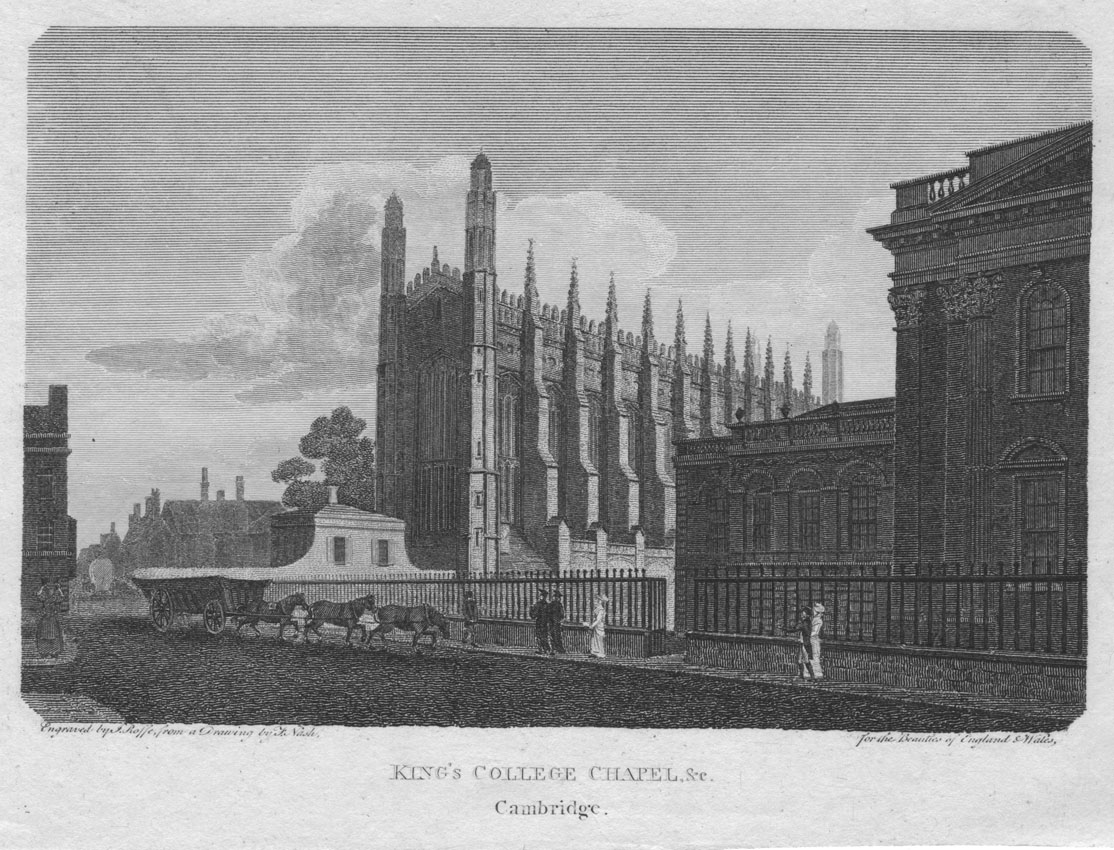
Illustration of King's College Chapel, Cambridge, from Beauties of England and Wales volume 2, 1801

The Beauties of England and Wales (1801–1815) is a series of books describing the topography and local history of England and Wales. Produced by a variety of London publishers, the work appeared in 18 multi-part volumes arranged by county, individually authored by John Bigland, Edward Wedlake Brayley, J. Norris Brewer, John Britton, John Evans, John Hodgson, Francis Charles Laird, Joseph Nightingale, Thomas Rees, and Frederic Shoberl. Each volume contained engraved illustrations by artists such as Thomas Hearne, J. M. W. Turner, John Varley, Benjamin West. (Note: Some of the images published in The Beauties of England and Wales reappeared as decoration on ceramic pottery.) Readers included Charles Dickens.
