= Luke Hansard =

English printer (1752–1828)

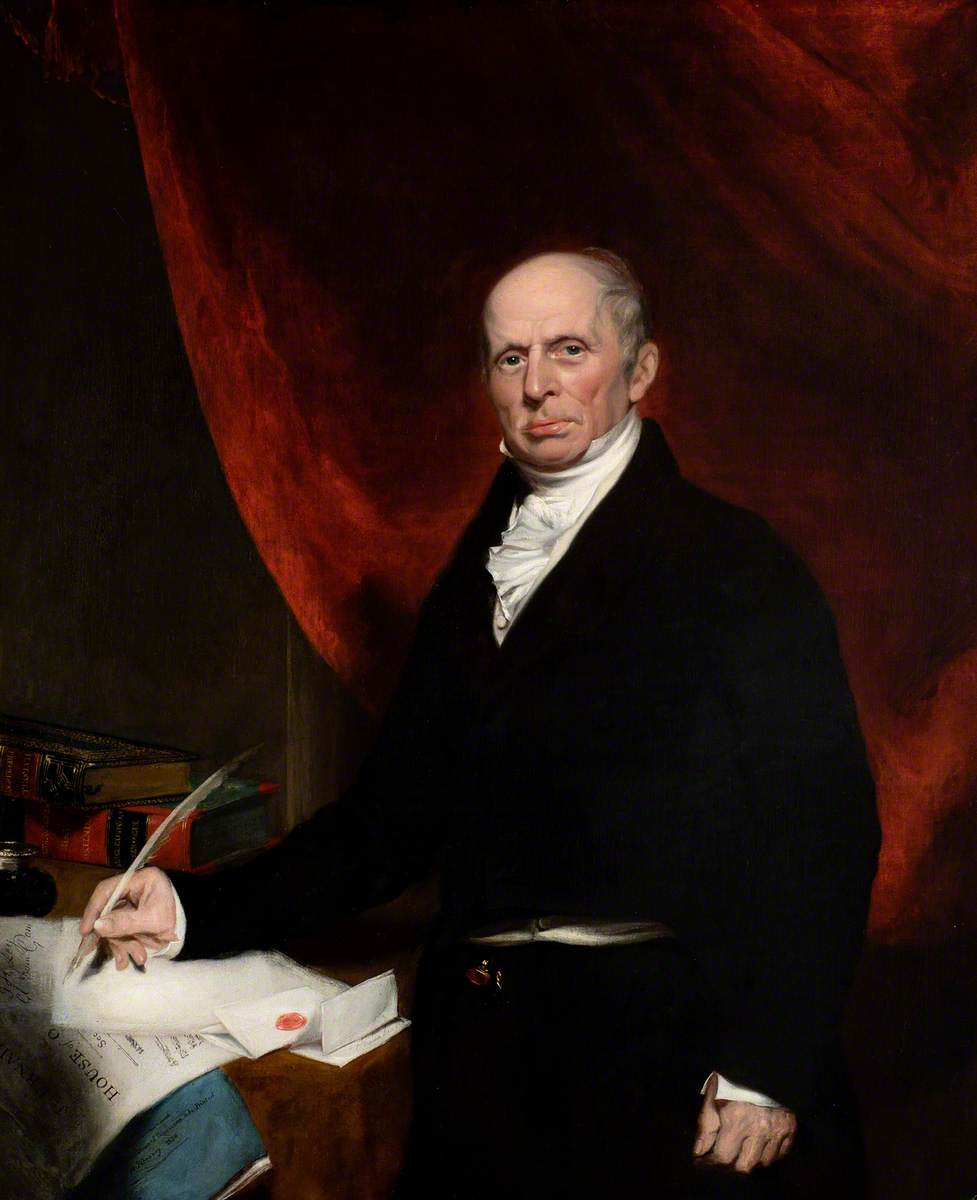
Portrait by Samuel Lane, 1827

Luke Hansard (5 July 1752 – 29 October 1828) was an English printer. He printed the Journals of the House of Commons from 1774 until his death. His son Thomas Curson Hansard took over the business of William Cobbett in 1812, and added the name "Hansard" to the title of the official reports of parliamentary debates and proceedings in 1829. This led to such reports in the United Kingdom and in some Commonwealth countries being customarily known as Hansard.

== Early life and education ==
Born in the parish of St Mary Coslany, Norwich, Hansard was the son of Thomas Hansard (1727–1769), a Norwich manufacturer. He was educated at Kirton Grammar School in Kirton, Lincolnshire, and was apprenticed to Stephen White, a Norwich printer.

== Career ==
As soon as Hansard's apprenticeship expired, he started for London with only a guinea in his pocket, and became a compositor in the office of John Hughs (1703–1771), printer to the British House of Commons. In 1774 he was made a partner, and undertook almost the entire conduct of the business, which in 1800 came completely into his hands. On the admission of his sons the firm became Luke Hansard & Sons, based on Parker Street, off Drury Lane.

Among those whose friendship Hansard won in the exercise of his profession were Edmund Burke, Samuel Johnson and Robert Orme, while Richard Porson praised him as the most accurate printer of Greek. Harriet Martineau wrote:

[...] Employed by Mr. Orme in printing his "History of India," he informed himself so thoroughly on Indian subjects, that he was Burke's right hand in selecting evidence from India documents for the trial of Warren Hastings. It was he who supplied, without delay, and without the commission of an error, the unequalled demand for Burke's "Essay on the French Revolution."

=== Parliamentary records ===
Hansard printed the Journals of the House of Commons from 1774 until his death. The promptitude and accuracy with which he printed parliamentary papers were often of the greatest service to government—on one occasion the proof-sheets of the report of the Secret Committee on the French Revolution were submitted to Prime Minister William Pitt the Younger 24 hours after the draft had left Pitt's hands.

On the union between Great Britain and Ireland in 1801, the increase of parliamentary printing compelled Hansard to give up all private printing except when Parliament was not sitting. He devised numerous expedients for reducing the expense of publishing the reports; and in 1805, when his workmen went on strike at a time of great pressure, he and his sons themselves set to work as compositors. Hansard's company became the Hansard Publishing Union.

In 1803, his son Thomas Curson Hansard went out on his own and set up premises in Paternoster Row. From 1809 this company printed the official reports of debates and proceedings in the Parliament of the United Kingdom, and owned the publication from 1812. In 1829 T. C. Hansard added the family's name to the title of the reports, which led to such reports in the United Kingdom and in some Commonwealth countries becoming known as Hansard.

== Biographies ==
- Hansard, Luke (1991). Robin Myers (ed.). The Auto-biography of Luke Hansard, written in 1817. Wakefield: Fleece Press. ISBN 978-0-948375-26-2.
- King, Evelyn Mansfield; Trewin, J. C. (1952). Printer to the House. London.
