= James Norris Brewer =

English topographer and novelist

James Jupp Norris Brewer (11 September 1777 – March 1839) was an English topographer and novelist.

He wrote many romances and topographical compilations, he also contributed to the series called the Beauties of England and Wales. All the former are now forgotten.

== Life ==
According to the Oxford Dictionary of National Biography (2004), Brewer "was the eldest son of a merchant of London. He married the daughter of a gentleman at Clapham... Nothing is recorded of his death."

From genealogical sources, a little more can be added. Brewer was born in London on 11 September 1777. He was baptised on 8 October 1777 at St Sepulchre Church in Holborn, where his parents James Brewer and Sarah Sparrow had been married on 4 May the previous year.

He too would be married at St Sepulchre, to Mary Hanscomb on 27 December 1800; and their son Edward Norris Brewer, who was born on 9 December 1801, was christened there on 7 January 1802. In the meantime it appears the two were involved in a court case, apparently against relatives of Mary's. Four further children, Mary Ann, Sarah Hanscomb, Emily, and Louisa, born between 1804 and 1812, were all christened at Hurst, Berkshire, from where Brewer also addressed the dedication of his first topographical book, dated February 1810.

Brewer was buried on 2 March 1839 at St Lawrence's Church, on Jersey. Probate was granted on 15 August 1839, and a copy of his will is available online from the National Archives. Assets included the freehold of a public house, which would be auctioned on 4 September. According to a notice of the death of Brewer's widow Mary, which appeared in the Gentleman's Magazine in November 1851, the couple had also lived for a time at Pillaton House, Warwickshire, as well as Jersey.

== Works ==
=== Romances ===
- A Winter's Tale, a romance, 1799, 4 vols. 12mo; 2nd edit., 1811.
- Mountville Castle, a Village Story, 3 vols., 1808, 12mo.
- Secrets made Public, a novel, 4 vols., 1808, 12mo.
- An Old Family Legend, 4 vols., 1811, 12mo.
- Sir Ferdinand of England, a romance, 4 vols., 1812, 12mo.
- Sir Gilbert Easterling, a romance, 4 vols. 12mo, 1813.
- The Fitzwalters, Barons of Chesterton; or Ancient Times in England, 1829, 4 vols. 12mo.

=== Essays ===
- Some Thoughts on the Present State of the English Peasantry, 1807, 8vo.

=== Topographical Works ===
- A Descriptive and Historical Account of various Palaces and Public Buildings, English and Foreign; with Biographical Notices of their Founders or Builders, and other eminent persons, 1810, 4to.
- The Beauties of England and Wales
  - History of Oxfordshire, 1813, 8vo.
  - Warwickshire, 1814.
  - Middlesex, 1816.
- Introduction to the Beauties of England and Wales, comprising observations on the Britons, the Romans in Britain, the Anglo-Saxons, the Anglo-Danes, and the Normans, 1818, 8vo.
- Histrionic Topography, or the Birthplaces, Residences, and Funeral Monuments of the most distinguished Actors, 1818, 8vo.
- The Picture of England, or Historical and Descriptive Delineations of the most curious Works of Nature and Art in each County, 1820, 8vo.
- The Delineations of Gloucestershire, 4to.
- The Beauties of Ireland, 1826, 2 vols. 8vo.

Brewer was also a contributor to the Universal, Monthly, and Gentleman's magazines.

== See also ==
- List of Minerva Press authors
- Minerva Press
