= John Britton (antiquary) =

English antiquary, topographer, author and editor (1771–1857)

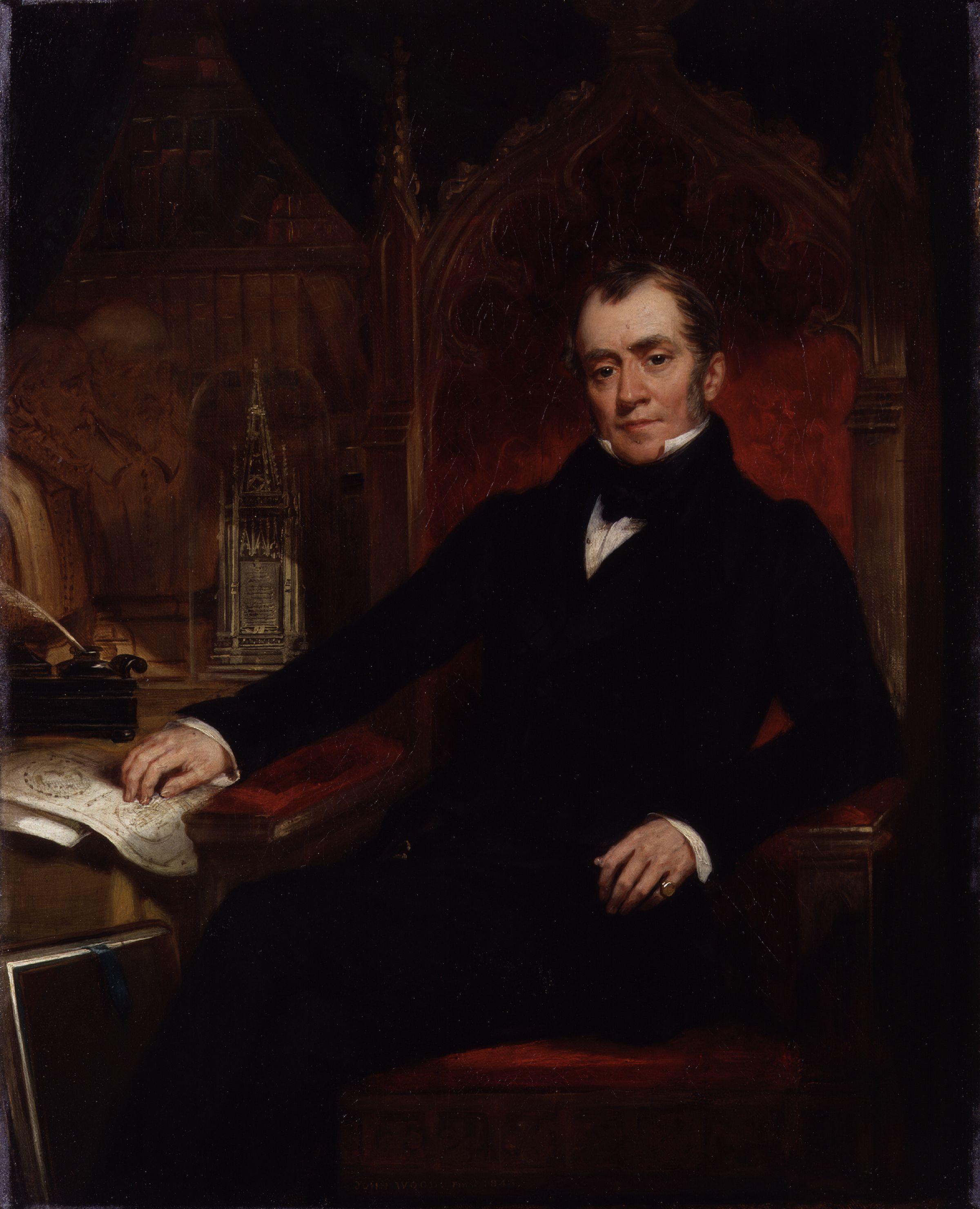
- Portrait of John Britton by John Wood, 1845
- Born: 7 July 1771; Kington St Michael, Wiltshire, England
- Died: 1 January 1857 (aged 85); London, England
- Resting place: West Norwood Cemetery
- Occupation: Writer

John Britton FSA (7 July 1771 – 1 January 1857) was an English antiquary, topographer, author and editor. He was a prolific populariser of the work of others, rather than an undertaker of original research. He is remembered as co-author (mainly in association with his friend Edward Wedlake Brayley) of nine volumes in the series The Beauties of England and Wales (1801–1814); and as sole author of the Architectural Antiquities of Great Britain (9 vols, 1805–1814) and Cathedral Antiquities of England (14 vols, 1814–1835).

== Early life ==
Britton was born on 7 July 1771 at Kington St Michael, near Chippenham, Wiltshire. His parents were in humble circumstances, and he was left an orphan at an early age. At sixteen he went to London and was apprenticed to a wine merchant. Prevented by ill-health from serving his full term, he found himself adrift in the world, without money or friends. In his fight with poverty he was put to strange shifts, becoming cellarman at a tavern and clerk to a lawyer, reciting and singing at a small theatre, and compiling a collection of common songs.

== Literary career ==
After some slight successes as a writer, a Salisbury publisher commissioned him to compile an account of Wiltshire and, in conjunction with his friend Edward Wedlake Brayley, Britton produced The Beauties of Wiltshire (1801; 2 vols., a third added in 1825), the first of the series The Beauties of England and Wales, nine volumes of which Britton and his friend wrote.

Britton was the originator of a new class of literary works. "Before his time", says Digby Wyatt, "popular topography was unknown." In 1805 Britton published the first part of his Architectural Antiquities of Great Britain (9 vols., 1805–1814); and this was followed by Cathedral Antiquities of England (14 vols., 1814–1835). In 1845 a Britton Club was formed, and a sum of £1000 was subscribed and given to Britton, who was subsequently granted a civil list pension by Disraeli, then chancellor of the exchequer. Britton was an earnest advocate of the preservation of national monuments, proposing in 1837 the formation of a society comparable to the later Society for the Protection of Ancient Buildings (founded 1877). Britton himself supervised the reparation of Waltham Cross and Stratford-on-Avon church.

Among other works with which Britton was associated, either as author or editor, are Historical Account of Redcliffe Church, Bristol (1813); Illustrations of Fonthill Abbey (1823); Architectural Antiquities of Normandy, with illustrations by Pugin (1825–1827); Picturesque Antiquities of English Cities (1830); Descriptive Sketches of Tunbridge Wells and the Calverley Estate (1832); and History of the Palace and Houses of Parliament at Westminster (1834–1836), the joint work of Britton and Brayley. He contributed much to the Gentleman's Magazine and other periodicals. For Rees's Cyclopædia he contributed articles on Topography, but the topics are not known. Among the students he employed were Samuel Rayner and George Cattermole, who were both to be successful artists.

His Autobiography was published in 1850. A Descriptive Account of his Literary Works was published by his assistant T. E. Jones.

== Wiltshire Archaeological and Natural History Society ==
Over a number of years, Britton made proposals for a Wiltshire Archaeological and Natural History Institute, building on the work of the Wiltshire Topographical Society and following the example of the Royal Archaeological Institute and the societies formed in other English counties. In 1852, aged 80, he offered to sell his collection of books, manuscripts, drawings and models relating to Wiltshire, and distributed a catalogue amongst his friends in the county; George Poulett Scrope and William Cunnington III formed a committee at Devizes and raised £150 to purchase the collection, which was at first housed at Devizes Town Hall.

Acquisition of the collection spurred Scrope, Cunnington and others to form the Wiltshire Archaeological and Natural History Society "to cultivate and collect information on archaeology and Natural History in their various branches and to form a Library and Museum illustrating the History, natural, civic and ecclesiastic of the County of Wilts." Britton gave an address at the inaugural meeting of the society in October 1853, and indicated that he would donate further material. The society went on to establish at Devizes a museum now known as Wiltshire Museum, which still holds an 1824 cabinet owned by Britton, and his books and papers.

== Death and legacy ==
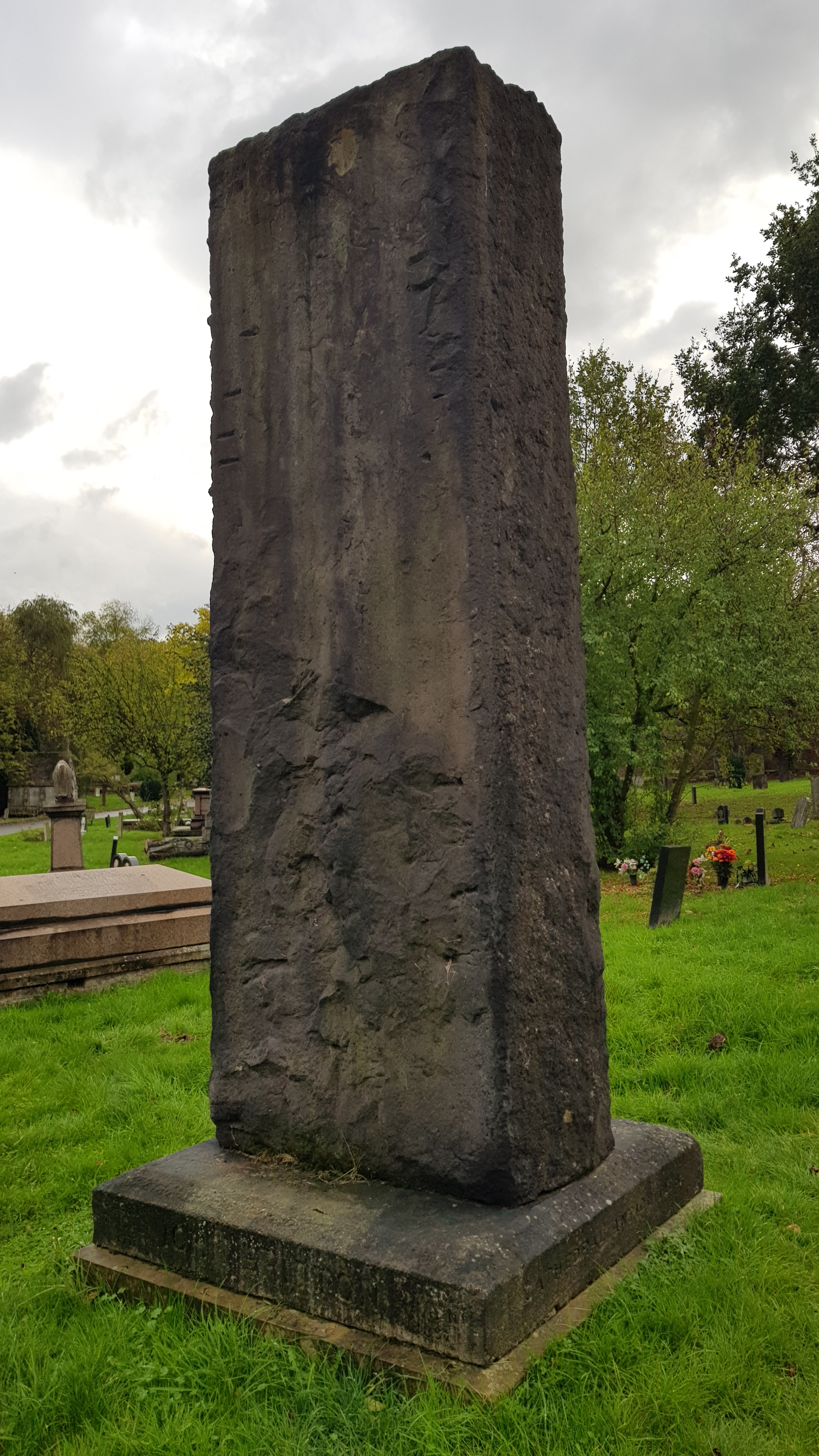
Britton's monument in West Norwood Cemetery

Britton died in London on 1 January 1857, and was buried in West Norwood Cemetery where his monument, a vertical 10' slab of brown granite, was designed to be as permanent as Stonehenge. It is listed Grade II*.

Britton Street in Clerkenwell (formerly known as Red Lion St) is named after him.

== In popular culture ==
Britton was lampooned for his inaccuracy in historical matters by Richard Harris Barham, writing under the name Thomas Ingoldsby, in two mock-antique ballads (with spurious annotations) entitled Relics of Antient Poetry. In the guise of "Mr Simpkinson", he also receives a number of jocular and derisory mentions in Barham's The Ingoldsby Legends (1840–1847).

== Selected publications ==
- The Architectural Antiquities of Great Britain. London: Longman, Hurst, Rees, and Orme. 1807–1826; 5 vols.
- The Fine Arts of the English School (PDF). London: Longman, Hurst, Rees, Orme, and Brown. 1812.
- Cathedral Antiquities. London: Longman, Hurst, Rees, Orme, Brown, and Green. 1814–1835; 16 vols. in 6
- Picturesque Antiquities of English Cities: illustrated by a series of engravings of ancient buildings, street scenery, etc. with historical and descriptive accounts of each subject. various illustrators and engravers, illustrations of Norwich by David Hodgson. London: Longham. 1830. OCLC 83539403.
- Graphic Illustrations, with Historical and Descriptive Accounts, of Toddington, Gloucestershire, the Seat of Lord Sudeley. London: Published by the author. 1840.
