= Hansard =

Transcripts of parliamentary debates in Britain and many Commonwealth countries

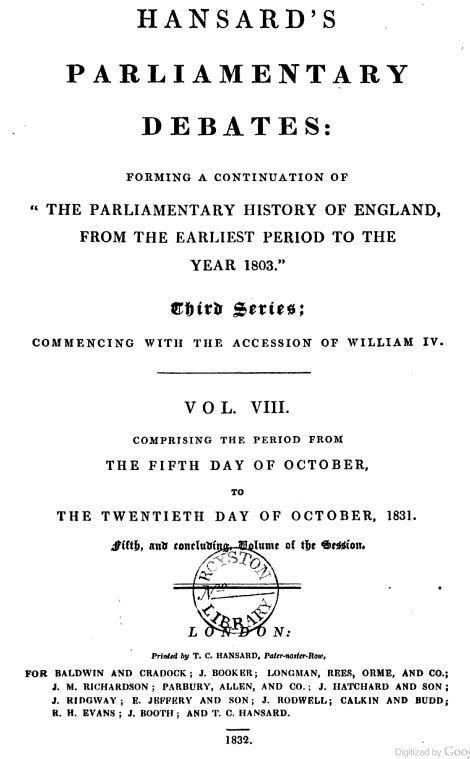
Hansard's title page in 1832

Hansard is the transcripts of parliamentary debates in the United Kingdom, Australia and other Commonwealth countries. It is named after Thomas Curson Hansard (1776–1833), a London printer and publisher, who was the first official printer to the Parliament at Westminster.

The UK's Hansard is not verbatim; it omits repetitions and redundancies and corrects obvious and grammatical mistakes, while attempting to maintain the meaning of all speeches. As MPs refer to each other by the name of their constituency, Hansard identifies MPs by name. Canada's Hansard is published in both English and French, noting the original language a member used.

For centuries, unauthorized reporting of proceedings at Westminster was prohibited by Parliament, which could punish reporters and publishers with fines or imprisonment. Enforcement of the prohibition effectively ended in 1771 following a dispute over attempts to arrest newspaper printers who had published parliamentary debates. From 1809, Hansard ran as independently published reports, although it was not comprehensive, first employing reporters in 1878. The Parliamentary Papers Act 1840, extended parliamentary privilege, including against English defamation law, to publications under Parliament's authority. In 1909, Parliament took over Hansard publication, beginning comprehensive accounting of all speeches with an official reporter staff.

Other Hansard transcripts are published for the legislatures of Australia, Canada, and New Zealand, as well as for the legislatures of the states of Australia and provinces of Canada.

== Origins ==
Though the history of the Hansard began in the British Parliament, each of Britain's colonies developed a separate and distinctive history. Before 1771, the British Parliament had long been a highly secretive body. The official record of the actions of the House was publicly available but there was no record of the debates. The publication of remarks made in the House became a breach of parliamentary privilege, punishable by the two Houses of Parliament. As the populace became interested in parliamentary debates, more independent newspapers began publishing unofficial accounts of them. The many penalties implemented by the government, including fines, dismissal, imprisonment, and investigations, are reflective of "the difficulties faced by independent newspapermen who took an interest in the development of Upper Canada, and who, in varying degrees, attempted to educate the populace to the shortcomings of their rulers".

Several editors used the device of reporting on parliamentary debates under the veil of debates of fictitious societies or bodies. The names under which parliamentary debates were published include Proceedings of the Lower Room of the Robin Hood Society and Debates of the Senate of Magna Lilliputia. The Senate of Magna Lilliputia was printed in Edward Cave's The Gentleman's Magazine, which was first published in 1732. The names of the speakers were carefully "filleted"; for example, Sir Robert Walpole was thinly disguised as "Sr. R―t W―le".

In 1771, Brass Crosby, who was Lord Mayor of London, had brought before him a printer by the name of John Miller who dared publish reports of parliamentary proceedings. He released the man, but was subsequently ordered to appear before the House to explain his actions. Crosby was committed to the Tower of London, but when he was brought to trial, several judges refused to hear the case and after protests from the public, Crosby was released. Parliament ceased to punish the publishing of its debates as harshly, partly due to the campaigns of John Wilkes on behalf of free speech. There then began several attempts to publish reports of debates. Among the early successes, the Parliamentary Register published by John Almon and John Debrett began in 1775 and ran until 1813.

William Cobbett (1763–1835), a noted radical and publisher, began publishing Parliamentary Debates as a supplement to his Political Register in 1802, eventually extending his reach back with the Parliamentary History. Cobbett's advocation for the freedom of the press was severely punished by the British Government. On 5 June 1810 William Cobbett stood trial for seditious libel for an article he wrote against the British Government which was published by Thomas Curson Hansard. Cobbett was found "guilty, upon the fullest and most satisfactory evidence". The court sentence read: "The court do adjudge that you, William Cobbett pay to our Lord the King a fine of £1000; that you be imprisoned in His Majesty's gaol of Newgate for the space of two years, and that at expiration of that time you enter into a recognizance to keep the peace for seven years—yourself in the sum of £3000, and two good and sufficient sureties in the sum of £1,000; and further, that you be imprisoned till that recognizance be entered into, and that fine paid". The sentence was described by J. C. Trewin as "vindictive". The Court argued that Thomas Curson Hansard, who had "seen the copy before it was printed, ought not to have suffered it to have been printed at all" and was sentenced to three months imprisonment in the King's Bench Prison.

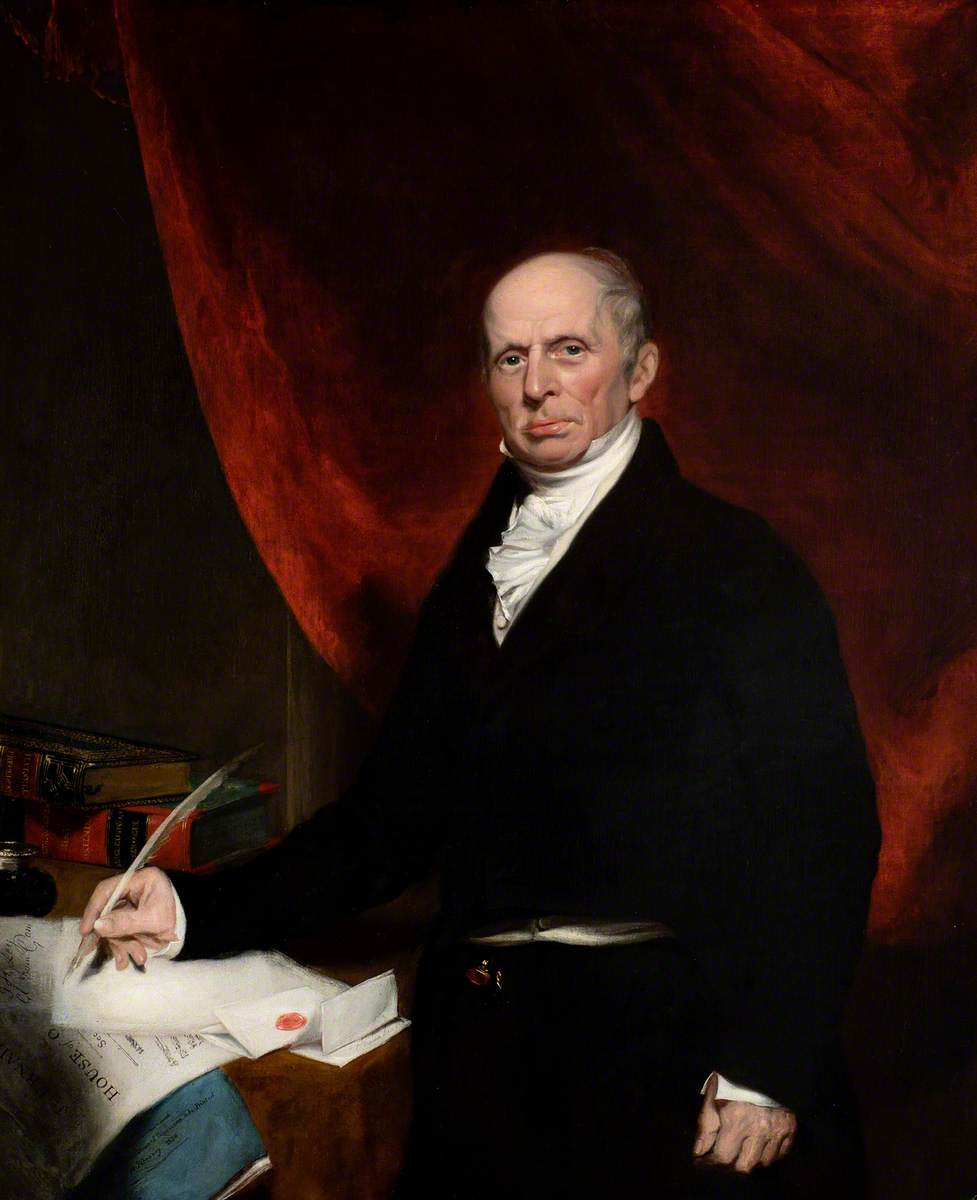
Portrait of Luke Hansard by Samuel Lane, 1827

Cobbett's reports were printed by Thomas Curson Hansard from 1809; in 1812, Cobbett's finances ran asunder and he divested himself of his proprietorship of both the Parliamentary Debates and Parliamentary History, which then "passed into the hands of Hansard in 1812". Cobbett's Parliamentary Debates became Hansard Parliamentary Debates, "abbreviated over time to the now familiar Hansard". From 1829 the name "Hansard" appeared on the title page of each issue. Cobbett and Hansard did not ever employ anyone to take down notes of the debates, which were taken from a multiplicity of sources in the morning newspapers. For this reason, early editions of Hansard are not to be absolutely relied upon as a guide to everything discussed in Parliament.

Hansard outlasted competitors including Almon and Debrett, and the later Mirror of Parliament published by J. H. Barrow from 1828 to 1843; Barrow's work was more comprehensive but he checked each speech with the Member and allowed them to correct anything they wished they had not said. The last attempt at a commercial rival was The Times which published debates in the 1880s. In 1878, a subsidy was granted to the Hansard press and at that point reporters were employed. Despite hiring contract reporters there were still widespread complaints about the accuracy of the debate reports. In 1889, Henry Hansard, the son of Thomas Hansard, broke the family connection with the debates.

== United Kingdom ==
Mr. Michael Brotherton (Louth) On a point of order, Mr. Speaker. Can you enlighten the House on how it will be possible to deal in future with the sort of trivia that has just wasted 22 minutes of the time of the House?
Mr. Speaker Order. Nothing said in this House is ever trivial.

— Hansard, 20 May 1981

The Hansard of today, a comprehensive account of every speech, began in 1909 when Parliament took over the publication and established its own staff of official Hansard reporters. At the same time, the decision was made to publish debates of the two houses in separate volumes, and to change the front cover from orange-red to light blue. A larger page format was introduced with new technology in 1980.

Hansard is not a word-for-word transcript of debates in Parliament. Its terms of reference are those set by a House of Commons select committee in 1893, as being a report which, though not strictly verbatim, is substantially the verbatim report with repetitions and redundancies omitted and with obvious mistakes (including grammatical mistakes) corrected, but which, on the other hand, leaves out nothing that adds to the meaning of the speech or illustrates the argument.

One instance of such an eliminated redundancy involves the calling of MPs to speak in the House of Commons. In that house, the Speaker must call on an MP by name before that member may speak, but Hansard makes no mention of the recognition accorded by the Speaker. Also, Hansard sometimes adds extraneous material to make the remarks less ambiguous. For example, though members refer to each other as "the hon. Member for Constituency Name" rather than by name, Hansard adds, in parentheses, the name of the MP being referred to, the first time that MP is referred to in a speech or debate. When an MP simply points at another whose constituency is forgotten, Hansard identifies the individual MP.

Any interruption to debate will be marked with the word "(Interruption)". This understated phrase covers a variety of situations, ranging from members laughing uproariously to the physical invasion of the chamber. Interjections from seated members, such as heckling during Prime Minister's Questions, are generally only included if the member who is speaking responds to the interjection.

Hansard also publishes written answers – known as written ministerial statements – made by government ministers in response to questions formally posed by members. In 1839, Hansard, by order of the House of Commons, printed and published a report stating that an indecent book published by a Mr. Stockdale was circulating in Newgate Prison. Stockdale sued for defamation but Hansard's defence, that the statement was true, succeeded. On publication of a reprint, Stockdale sued again but Hansard was ordered by the House to plead that he had acted under order of the Commons and was protected by parliamentary privilege. In the resulting case of Stockdale v Hansard, the court found that the house held no privilege to order publication of defamatory material. In consequence, Parliament passed the Parliamentary Papers Act 1840 to establish privilege for publications under the house's authority. Between 1888–1891 and 1893–1901 Nancy Bailey was Hansard's official indexer. She also compiled retrospective indexes for Hansard volumes covering 1830–1890, completing this work by 1903.

Since 1909, and for important votes before then, Hansard has listed how members have voted in divisions. Furthermore, the proceedings and debates in committee are also published in separate volumes. For many years the House of Commons Hansard did not formally acknowledge the existence of parties in the House, except obliquely, with MPs' references to other MPs of the same party as "hon. Friends", but in 2003 this changed and members' party affiliations are now identified. The Hansard of the House of Lords operates entirely independently of its Commons counterpart, but with similar terms of reference. It covers parliamentary business in the House of Lords chamber itself, as well as the debates in the Moses Room, known as Grand Committee. Parliamentary written answers and statements are also printed. Emma Crewe notes that "Editors view reporters in general as a hive of revolution and anti-establishment attitudes, while they perceive themselves as calm and uncomplaining". The Internet, with the help of volunteers, has made the UK Hansard more accessible. The UK Hansard is currently being digitised to a high-level format for on-line publication. It is possible to review and search the UK Hansard from 1803, with the exception of standing committees.

Because Hansard is treated as accurate, there is a parliamentary convention whereby if a member of Parliament makes an inaccurate statement in Parliament, they must write a correction in the copy of Hansard kept in the House of Commons library.

In 2010, historic copies of Hansard were sent to India in its original volume format and was transformed from the original bound versions into plain text by optical character recognition (OCR) and put on the Internet to enable easy research. In July 2018 this digitised Hansard was vastly improved and merged with the rest of Hansard as previously it was available under two websites and now it is a single website. There are still many 'typos' from the OCR process but readers are encouraged to report them when they are spotted.

== Canada ==
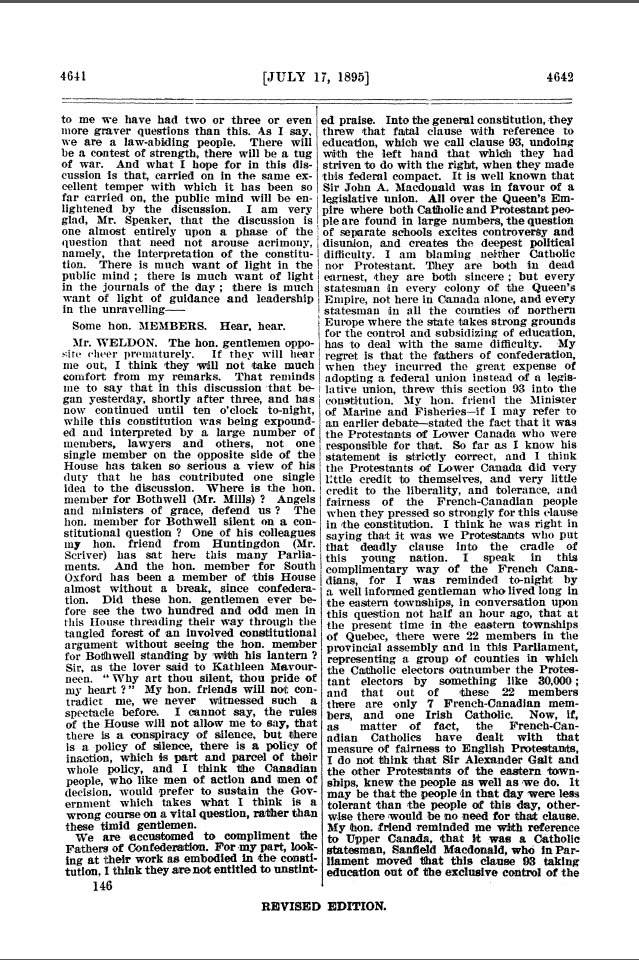
Sample of Hansard from the Canadian House of Commons, 1895. Shows sample of several members speaking as described in the text.

=== House of Commons ===
As with the Westminster Hansard, the Canadian version is not strictly verbatim, and is guided by the principle of avoiding "repetitions, redundancies and obvious errors". Unlike the UK House of Commons, members are referred to in the House only by the parliamentary ridings they represent ("The member for Richmond Hill", etc.) or by their cabinet post. Hansard supplies an affiliation the first time each member speaks in the House on a particular day—"Mr. Mathieu Ravignat (Pontiac, NDP)" or "Hon. Lynne Yelich (Minister of State for Western Economic Diversification, CPC)"—and by name only when they rise later to speak.

If interjections give rise to a call for order by the Speaker, they are reported as "Some hon. members: Oh, oh!" The details of the approval or negativing of motions and bills are reported in rather baroque detail:

The Acting Speaker (Mr. Marcel Proulx): The House has heard the terms of the motion. Is it the pleasure of the House to adopt the motion?

Some hon. members: Agreed.
Some hon. members: No.
The Acting Speaker (Mr. Marcel Proulx): All those in favour of the motion will please say yea.
Some hon. members: Yea.
The Acting Speaker (Mr. Marcel Proulx): All those opposed will please say nay.
Some hon. members: Nay.
The Acting Speaker (Mr. Marcel Proulx): In my opinion the nays have it.
And more than five members having risen:
The Acting Speaker (Mr. Marcel Proulx): Call in the members.
And the bells having rung:

The Acting Speaker (Mr. Marcel Proulx): A recorded division on the motion stands deferred until tomorrow at the end of government orders.

==== Translation ====
Given the bilingual nature of the Canadian federal government, two equivalent Canadian Hansards are maintained, one in French and one in English. This makes it a natural parallel text, and it is often used to train French–English machine translation programs. In addition to being already translated and aligned, the size of the Hansards and the fact that new material is always being added makes it an attractive corpus. However, its usefulness is hindered by the fact that the translations, although accurate in meaning, are not always literally exact.

The Canadian Hansard records make note of the language used by the members of parliament, so as not to misinterpret the words of the person who has the floor. If the member speaks in French, the English Hansard records would state that the member spoke in French and refer the reader to the French Hansard record.

In one instance, during a Liberal filibuster in the Senate of Canada, Senator Philippe Gigantès was accused by Quebec Tory Paul David of reading one of his books only so that he could get the translation for free through the Hansard.

=== Manitoba ===
Manitoba Hansard, formally known as Debates and Proceedings, is the official transcript of debates and other proceedings of the Legislative Assembly of Manitoba and its committees. It is produced by the Assembly's Hansard Branch, which also indexes and archives legislative transcripts and provides audio services for Assembly proceedings.

The Hansard Branch is responsible for the daily production of transcripts of proceedings in the House and in Assembly committees. It also indexes and archives transcripts dating from 1958, which are available online and of which recent ones are available in both PDF and HTML format. Its technical responsibilities include sound reinforcement in the Chamber and committee rooms and the live transmission of legislative audio within and beyond the Legislative Building.

The branch has five full-time employees and dozens of sessional and casual employees, and participates in the Hansard Association of Canada, an organization founded in 1972. Members meet annually to exchange information about reporting technologies, editing, grammar, fact-checking, staffing and training.

Manitoba hosted the association's annual conference in Winnipeg in August 2022 after the event, originally scheduled for 2020, was postponed because of the COVID-19 pandemic. Delegates represented Canadian provincial and territorial legislatures, the House of Commons, the Senate, the federal Translation Bureau and parliamentary reporting services from Ireland and the United Kingdom. Sessions addressed automated speech recognition, XML structures for Hansard, neural machine translation and human speech perception. Niigaan Sinclair delivered a keynote address on Indigenous traditions and perspectives relating to the recording of events.

The top three extended sittings since the start of the 37th Legislature (1999–2003) occurred on May 26–27, 2026, June 2–3, 2025, and August 8–9, 2002. These are among the longest sitting days documented in Manitoba Hansard during that period.

The May 26–27, 2026 sitting began at 10 a.m. on May 26 and continued into the late afternoon of the following day. Much of the extended sitting was devoted to Bill 53, The Budget Implementation and Tax Statutes Amendment Act, 2026 (BITSA). The House agreed not to see the clock until all questions relating to second reading had been disposed of, and debate continued through the night on a reasoned amendment, a hoist amendment and the main motion. Recorded divisions on the amendments and second reading, with one-hour division bells preceding the votes, further extended the proceedings.

On June 2–3, 2025, the House met at 1:30 p.m. and remained in session until shortly after 8 a.m. the following morning. Proceedings included consideration of the remaining stages of Bill 47, The Fair Trade in Canada (Internal Trade Mutual Recognition) Act and Amendments to The Commemoration of Days, Weeks and Months Act (Buy Manitoba, Buy Canadian Day), followed by concurrence and third-reading proceedings on numerous other government bills. A succession of recorded divisions, many preceded by one-hour division bells, contributed substantially to the length of the sitting. The Royal Assent ceremony took place at 7:55 a.m., and the Assembly rose at 8:12 a.m.

The August 8–9, 2002 extended sitting began with committee proceedings at 8:30 a.m. on August 8, while the House itself met at 1:30 p.m., and Assembly proceedings continued until 6:57 a.m. the following morning. The House agreed not to see the clock at its usual 6 p.m. adjournment hour and continued through the night. Major legislative business included the supply measures Bill 56, The Loan Act, 2002, and Bill 57, The Appropriation Act, 2002; Bill 41, The Manitoba Hydro Amendment Act, which involved debate over a $288-million transfer from Manitoba Hydro; and Bill 53, The Common-Law Partners' Property and Related Amendments Act. Bill 41 was decided by recorded division at approximately 4:30 a.m.; Hansard records proceedings still under way at 6:50 a.m. before the House proceeded to Royal Assent and adjournment.

As of August 2026, the branch's management consists of the Director, Todd LaRue; Audio Technology and Services Manager, Trevor Melanchuk; Managing Editor, Angelina Paras; and Production and Administration Manager, Jocelyne Anderes. The branch's Indexer is Sherri MacQuarrie.

=== Newfoundland ===
In Newfoundland the struggle for the free press was much more violent. Henry Winton, editor of Saint John's Ledger, "had his ears cut off and was left unconscious by thugs who had been lying in wait for him after dark". The fate of Winton was to be his printer's as well. The Authorities, who were not on friendly terms with the Ledger, made little to no effort to apprehend the culprits. In another case, a "Gentleman by the name Parsons", of the Newfoundland Patriot, "was sentenced to three months imprisonment in another incident".

=== Nova Scotia ===
As was the case in many early Canadian regions, the newspapers were the first source of the parliamentary debates. Canada's first newspaper, the Halifax Gazette, was printed on Grafton street in Halifax in 1752. The two most prominent papers in parliamentary reporting were the Acadian Recorder, founded in 1813 by Anthony Henry Holland, and the Free Press, established in 1816 by Edward Ward. Both newspapers reported the debates of the House of Assembly starting in 1817.

The Family Compact of Nova Scotia, nicknamed "the little compact", "viewed the admission of reporters to the Assembly with disdain" and "were not slow to react whenever they felt the slightest affront". There are many cases which exemplify the "struggle to obtain freedom of the press and parliamentary reportings in the Maritimes" as in the case of William Minns in 1823, who was forced to appear before the bar of the house, and William Milne, who was jailed for not being able to pay his debts.

The Novascotian newspaper would soon become Nova Scotia's most prominent paper after its launch in 1824, which was highly influenced by George Young who was instrumental in its establishment. George Young sought permission from the Assembly to report its debates. Permission was granted, yet he was not provided with very many privileges in the House. They did not make it easy for him and did not allow him a seat in the lower deck.

In 1827, Joseph Howe bought the Novascotian from Young. "There was no more powerful an advocate of parliamentary debates than Howe". In 1835 Joseph Howe was "prosecuted over a publication of a letter in the Novascotian". He was charged with libel. This case was infamous and is considered to be a "cornerstone in the establishment of freedom of the press in Canada". Howe, who defended himself in court, was found to be Not Guilty. This is why his case is viewed as a milestone in the development of the free press.

=== Ontario ===
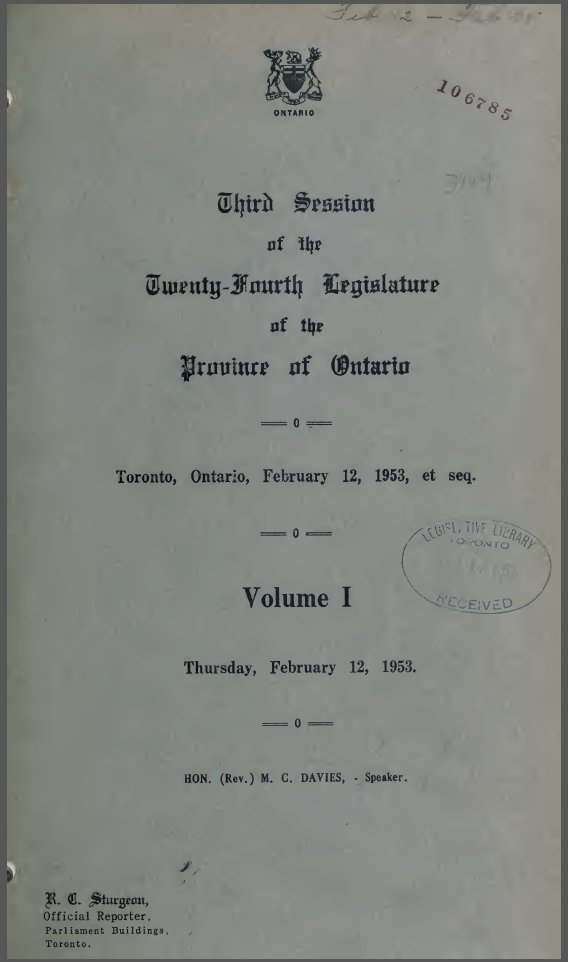
Cover page of Hansard for the Province of Ontario, February 12, 1953

No official record of the debates in the provincial Legislature was produced before 1944. The debates were reported in various newspapers; the provincial archives clipped and collected these reports in a series of scrapbooks until 1953. The provincial website now posts Hansard online, with records from March 29, 1977, to current.

=== Alberta ===
Alberta adopted a Hansard in 1972. From 1905 to 1971, local newspapers reported on legislative proceedings, and from these articles the Legislature Library has compiled a Scrapbook Hansard, which is available online. News reporters were allowed to take handwritten notes in the Chamber, but they could not make sound recordings, and members of the public were not allowed to take notes.

In 1965 a recording system was installed in the Chamber. Initially the Clerk's office provided transcription only for special events, such as throne speeches, but requests from MLAs for transcripts increased, and by 1971 all House proceedings were being recorded. On March 8, 1972, the government introduced a motion to create Alberta Hansard, and the following day they brought forward a motion allowing audio and video recording in the Chamber and also permitting visitors to the galleries to take notes. Assembly standing orders 115 and 116 set out the rules for broadcast media in the Chamber and at committee meetings, respectively.

Hansard staff verifies the names of individuals and entities mentioned in the House. Like other Hansards, Alberta Hansard follows editorial guidelines established in the 19th century, and transcripts are substantially verbatim. Revisions are limited to "the correction of grammar, spelling and punctuation, ensuring that the correct parliamentary forms are observed, and minimizing superfluous repetition and redundancies, but no material alterations shall be made, nor any amendments that would in any way tend to change the sense of what has been spoken."

Transcripts for Legislative Assembly of Alberta proceedings from 1972 onward are available online, and current issues are usually posted within 12 hours of the day's sitting. A transcript for a regular afternoon Assembly sitting of 4.5 hours contains more than 30,000 words. Also available online are transcripts for meetings of committees of the Legislative Assembly from the 1990s onward, earlier for some committees.

=== British Columbia ===
No complete official record of the debates in the British Columbia Legislature was produced until 1972; a partial record was issued beginning in 1970. As with Ontario, various newspapers reported on the proceedings, which can be found in the Legislative Assembly Sessional Clippings Books, provided by the University of Victoria Unlike the Ottawa Hansard, opposition members and government backbenchers are identified only by initial and last name: "A. Wilkinson". Current cabinet ministers have their names prefaced with "Honourable": "Hon. S. Hagen". Interjections giving rise to a call for order by the Speaker are reported only as "Interjection". Other interjections are reported as spoken if they are clearly audible and if they are responded to in some way by the member who has the floor. While the details of approval or negativing of motions and bills closely parallel the House of Commons, the reporting is simplified to a style line ("Motion approved" or "Motion negatived").

== Australia ==
Several volumes from the New South Wales Legislative Council.

The Parliament of Australia also keeps record of debates, using the term Hansard. The Parliament of South Australia was the first Australian parliament to use Hansard; where it became a convention from 1857.

The Parliament of Victoria followed the lead of South Australia by introducing the use of Hansard in 1866. The Parliament of New South Wales commenced its Hansard system on 28 October 1879 with the reporting of the Legislative Council at the opening of the Third Session of the Ninth Parliament. In Tasmania, Hansard was not introduced until 1979, commencing on 6 June for the Legislative Council and 12 June for the House of Assembly.

== New Zealand ==
On 9 July 1867, a team of five reporters, led by Chief Reporter C.C.N. Barron, produced the first official report of debates of the New Zealand Parliament. Ever since that day official transcripts of members' speeches in the New Zealand House of Representatives have been continuously published.

Today the New Zealand Hansard is produced by a team of 17 FTE Hansard Editors within the Office of the Clerk of the House of Representatives. Hansard is published on the New Zealand Parliament website each day the House sits, and later indexed bound volumes are produced.

Speeches are transcribed directly from digital recordings of the debate, with staff present in the debating chamber to monitor the debate by recording the sequence of speakers and any interjections. Interjections are reported only if the member speaking replies to them or remarks on them during the course of his or her speech. Hansard Editors follow strict rules on what changes they can make to the words members use in the chamber. Hansard is as close to verbatim as possible, although Hansard Editors remove repetitions and redundancies and make minor grammatical corrections. Members are provided draft copies of their speeches at the same time that the speeches are first published on the Parliament website. Members can request correction of inadvertent factual inaccuracies but they are unable to significantly change what they said in the House.

== List of assemblies using the system ==
- Parliament of the United Kingdom and the UK's devolved institutions
- Parliament of Canada and the Canadian provincial and territorial legislatures
- Parliament of Australia and the Australian state and territory parliaments
- Parliament of South Africa and South Africa's provincial legislatures
- Parliament of Barbados
- East African Legislative Assembly
- New Zealand Parliament
- Legislative Council of Hong Kong
- Parliament of Malaysia and the Malaysian state legislatures
- National Parliament of Papua New Guinea
- Parliament of Singapore
- Legislative Council of Brunei
- Parliament of Sri Lanka
- Parliament of Trinidad and Tobago
- National Assembly of Kenya
- National Assembly of Tanzania
- Parliament of Ghana
- Parliament of Uganda
- Parliament of Mauritius
- Parliament of Jamaica
- National Assembly of Seychelles
- States of Jersey
- States of Guernsey
- Tynwald, the Parliament of the Isle of Man
- National Assembly of Nigeria
- National Assembly of Namibia
- Parliament of Botswana
- Parliament of Zimbabwe
- Parliament of Nauru
- Parliament of Tuvalu

== See also ==
- List of British colonial gazettes
- Congressional Record, the equivalent for the United States
- Journal officiel
- Transcripts of legislative bodies, for other countries
- Court reporter
- Fuddle duddle
- Hansard Society
- Pepper v Hart
- TheyWorkForYou
