= John Stockdale =

English publisher

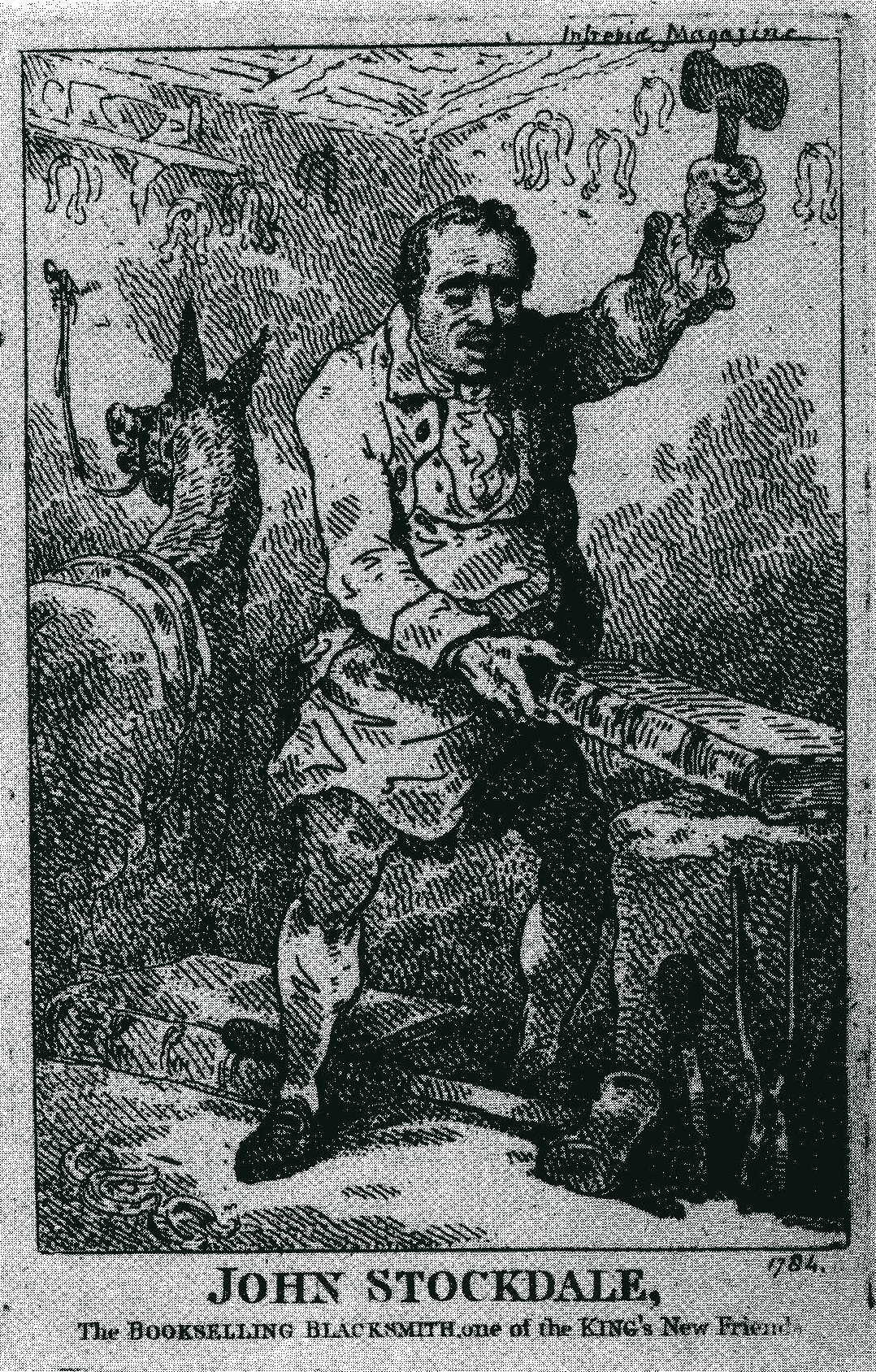
John Stockdale "The Bookselling Blacksmith" by Thomas Rowlandson

John Stockdale (25 March 1750 – 21 June 1814) was an English publisher whose London shop became a salon for the political classes and who had to face two actions for defamation. One by the House of Commons became a cause célèbre and resulted in an important change in the law.

== Life ==
John Stockdale was born in Caldbeck, Cumberland, the son of Priscilla Stockdale (1726–1789) and Joseph Stockdale. He is believed to have been raised as a blacksmith, like his father, and then to have become valet to John Astley of Dukinfield, Cheshire. He married Mary Ridgway, a native of Roe Cross, Mottram-in-Longdendale, Cheshire, and sister to James Ridgway, a well-known publisher of Piccadilly, London. He had met Mary in the Dukinfield Moravian chapel.

Stockdale moved to London about 1780 (or 1770) and worked as a porter to publisher John Almon, near to the premises of his brother in law. When Almon retired from business in favour of John Debrett, Stockdale opened a book shop in competition and, "being a man of natural parts, he soon became conspicuous in business in spite of much eccentricity of conduct and great coarseness of manners". Both Stockdale's and Debrett's premises became meeting places for the political classes, Debrett's being frequented by the Whigs and Stockdale's by the supporters of William Pitt. John Adams, one of the Founding Fathers of the United States, lodged with Stockdale for two months during 1783.

He was an industrious publisher and among the many works that he published were:

- Adam Ferguson's History of the Progress and Termination of the Roman Republic (1783);
- An edition of William Shakespeare's Dramatic Works (1784);
- Bryan Edwards's History of the West Indies;
- George Chalmers' edition of Daniel Defoe's History of the Union;
- Arthur Phillip's Voyage to Botany Bay;
- Samuel Johnson's Works (1787) (volumes 12 and 13 of which Stockdale edited);
- John Whitaker various works.
- Hester Thrale's Retrospection: or, a review of the most striking and important events, characters, situations and their consequences, which the last eighteen hundred years have presented to the view of mankind (1801).

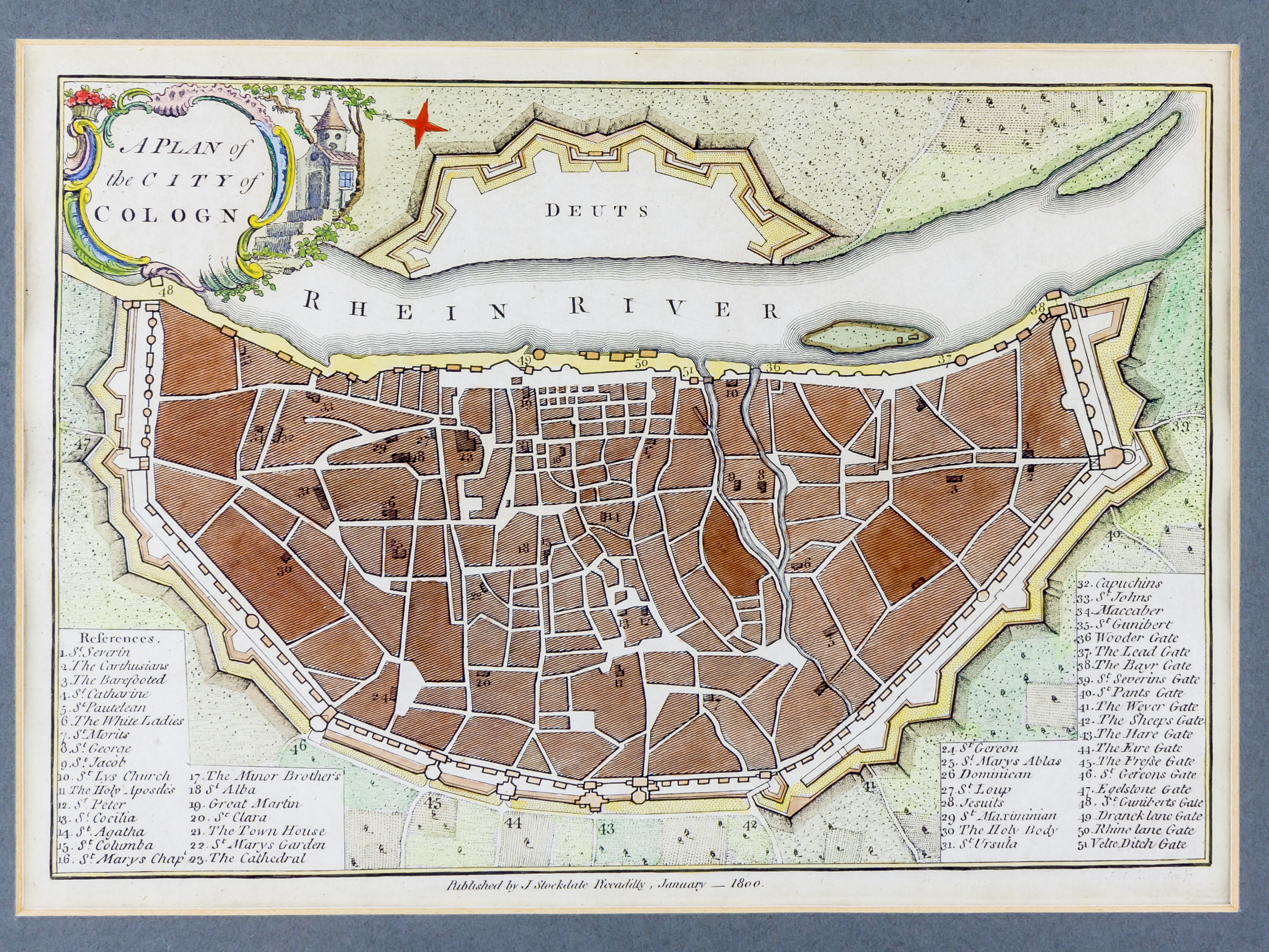
A Plan of the City of Cologne (Germany), published by John Stockdale in 1800

He also issued the London Courant newspaper, Debates in Parliament (1784–90), an edition of Robinson Crusoe and John Aikin's A Description of the Country from Thirty to Forty Miles round Manchester (1795), originally intended to be merely an account of the neighbourhood of Mottram-in-Longdendale, with which Stockdale had personal acquaintance, as well as various geographic maps and plans.

== Litigation ==
In 1788 he published John Logan's Review of the Charges against Warren Hastings. The work was conceived by the government to embody a libellous charge of corruption and injustice against the House of Commons. Stockdale was accordingly prosecuted. The case came before Lord Kenyon in December 1789 and Stockdale was eloquently defended by Thomas Erskine. Erskine contended that the defendant was not to be judged by isolated passages, selected and put together in the accusation, but by the entire context of the publication and its general character and objects. Stockdale was acquitted, and such a conspicuous defence of the liberty of the press led to the passing of the Libel Act 1792 (32 Geo. 3. c. 60), which established that nobody was to be punished for a few unguarded expressions, and left the construction of an alleged libeller's general purpose and animus in writing to a jury.

Stockdale again figured as defendant in an action for libel brought by Joseph Nightingale in 1809, when he had to pay £200 damages. Towards the end of his career he dealt largely in remaindered books from other publishers, and caused some resentment among the regular traders by a series of sales of books by auction which he established in various parts of the country. Early in his enterprise he had acquired considerable property, but afterwards he was less successful and the circumstance of having to make an arrangement with his creditors is said to have caused him some anxiety and accelerated his death.

== Family ==
Stockdale and his wife had several children including:

- Mary Stockdale, writer and publisher;
- John Joseph Stockdale, publisher who was also the subject of a libel case involving parliament in Stockdale v. Hansard; and
- William Stockdale, bookseller.
