= Rima Brayley =

Feature on the Moon

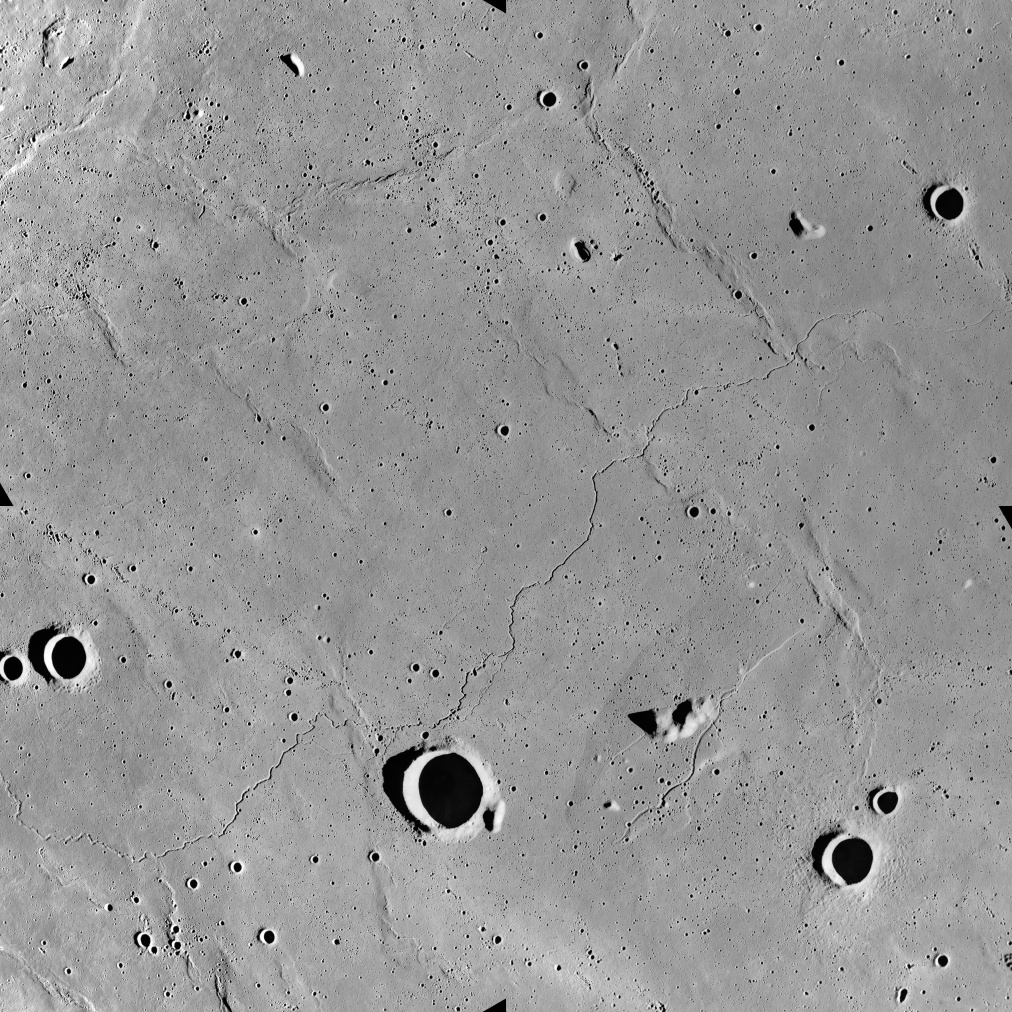
Apollo 17 image, showing nearly all of Rima Brayley.

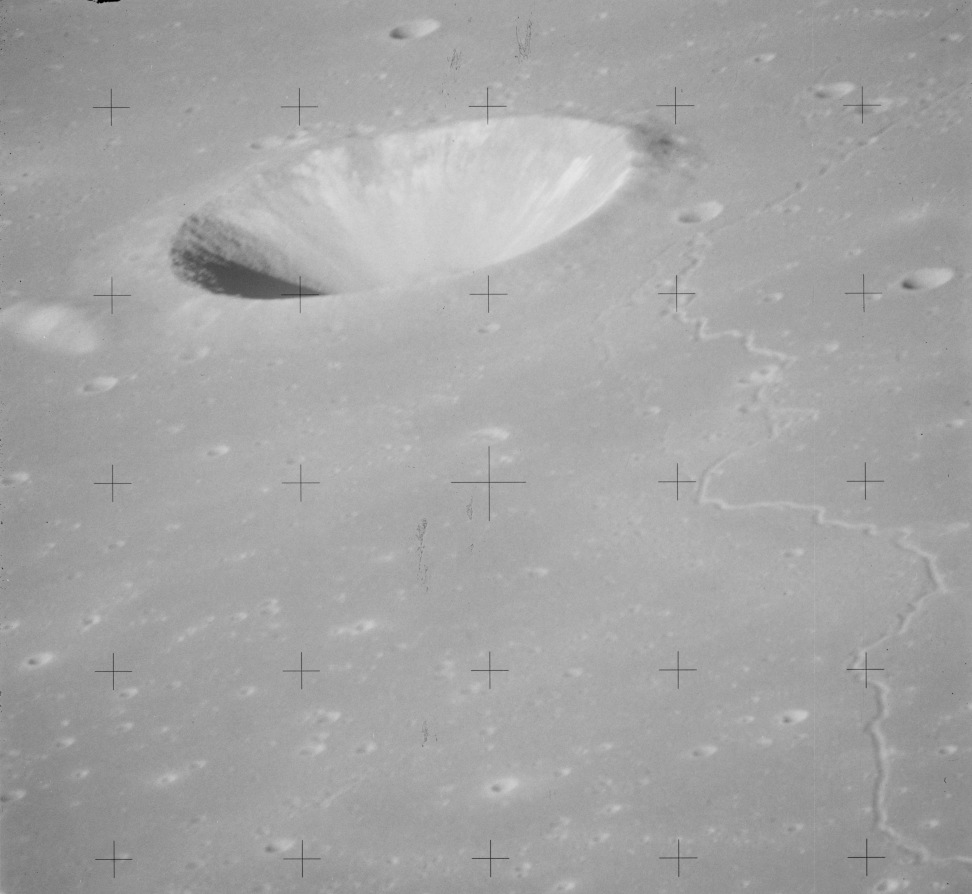
Apollo 15 image, showing Brayley crater and part of Rima Brayley.

Rima Brayley is a sinuous rille on the moon, centered on selenographic coordinates 22.30°N 36.35°W. It crosses from Oceanus Procellarum in the west, passes close to the north rim of Brayley crater, and passes into Mare Imbrium in the east. The name of the feature was approved by the IAU in 1985.
