= Mary Stockdale =

British writer (1774–1854)

Mary Ridgway Stockdale (1774–1854) was an English writer on the themes of Christian spirituality. She was born on 18 May 1774 in parish of St James, Piccadilly, Westminster, and was the daughter of John Stockdale and sister of John Joseph Stockdale.

== Early life ==
Mary was a sickly child, educated at the home of her father, a publisher. As she grew older, her health recovered and she pursued her own education, reading widely and enthusiastically. She soon devoted herself to nursing her mother and family and a young maid servant Elizabeth Haws. When Elizabeth died, Mary wrote her first poem, The Effusions of the Heart which her father offered to publish. However, Mary modestly refused and only allowed publication when she herself again fell ill and believed herself near to death. In The Mirror of the Mind, she wrote of "the emptiness of sublunary things" and that she held "the most perfect indifference for everything around me."

She died at the age of 80 and was buried on 16 June 1854 in the parish of Hayes, Middlesex.

== Works ==
- The Effusions of the Heart: Poems (1798)
- The Mirror of the Mind: Poems (with an autobiography) (1810), 2 vols.
- The Looking-glass for the Mind, Or, Intellectual Mirror: Being an Elegant Collection of the Most Delightful Little Stories and Interesting Tales, translations from Arnaud Berquin and others
- Some minor pieces.

== Bibliography ==
- Barros, C. A. & Smith, J. M. (2000). Life-writings by British Women, 1660–1815: An Anthology. UPNE. pp. pp394–402. ISBN 1555534325. (Google Books)
- Sutton, C. W. (1897) "Stockdale, John", in Lee, S. (ed.) Dictionary of National Biography
