= Brayley (crater) =

Crater on the Moon

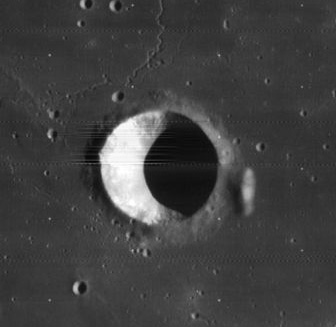
- Lunar Orbiter 4 image
- Coordinates: 20.9°N 36.9°W
- Diameter: 14.17 km (8.80 mi)
- Depth: 2.84 km (1.76 mi)
- Colongitude: 37° at sunrise
- Formation: Eratosthenian
- Eponym: Edward W. Brayley

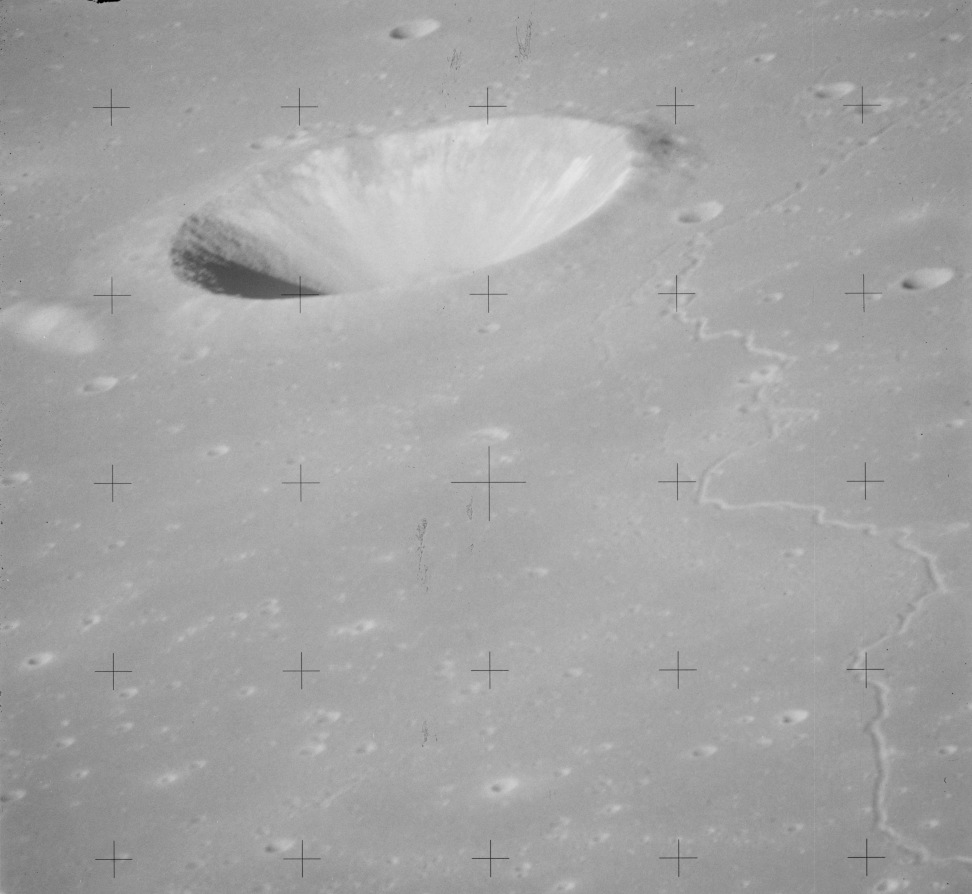
Apollo 15 image

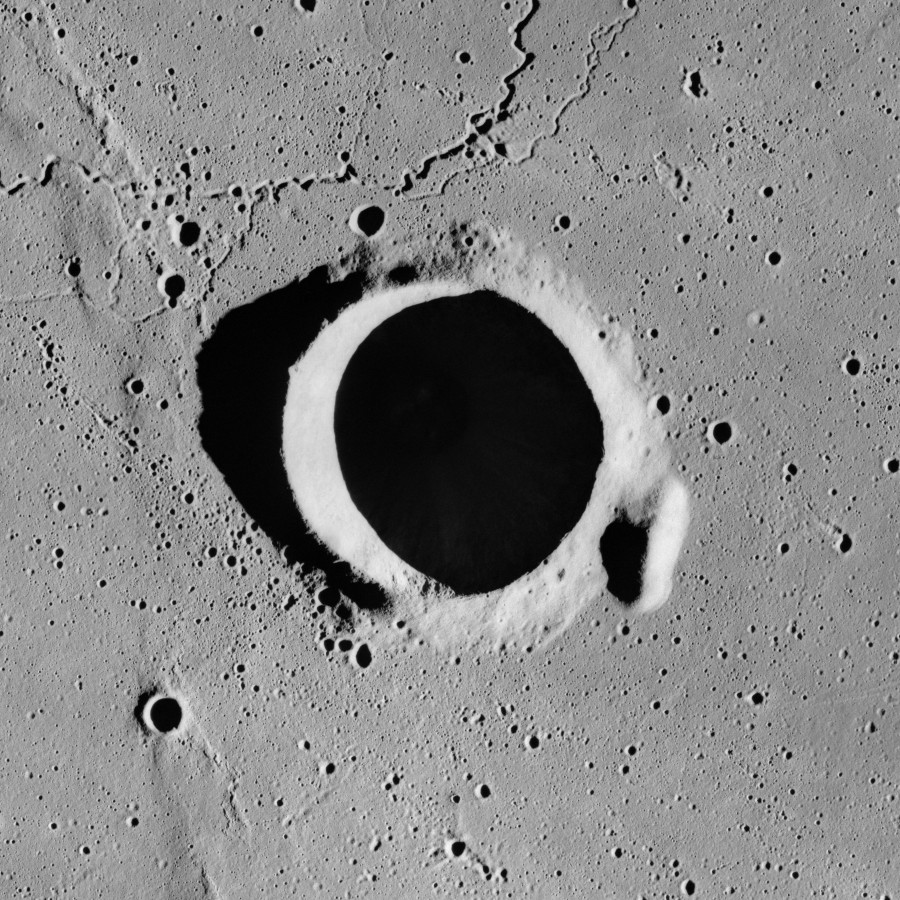
Apollo 17 image

Brayley is a lunar impact crater located in the southwest part of the Mare Imbrium. It dates to the Eratosthenian age on the lunar geologic timescale. This crater has a circular rim with darker radial bands on the interior and a low rise in the center. There are no notable craters overlapping the rim or interior, although the outer ejecta blanket has been partially buried by subsequent lava flows. The slender, sinuous rille Rima Brayley passes to the northwest of Brayley, extending for a length of about 240 km.

This formation is named after British geographer Edward W. Brayley (1801–1870). His name was introduced into lunar nomenclature by William R. Birt and John Lee. Its designation was formally adopted by the International Astronomical Union in 1935.

== Satellite craters ==
By convention these features are identified on lunar maps by placing the letter on the side of the crater midpoint that is closest to Brayley.

Brayley	Latitude	Longitude	Diameter
B	20.8° N	34.3° W	10 km
C	21.4° N	39.4° W	9 km
D	20.1° N	32.8° W	6 km
E	21.2° N	39.7° W	5 km
F	21.1° N	34.0° W	5 km
G	24.2° N	36.5° W	5 km
K	21.2° N	41.7° W	3 km
L	20.9° N	42.6° W	4 km
S	25.0° N	36.7° W	3 km

== Gallery ==
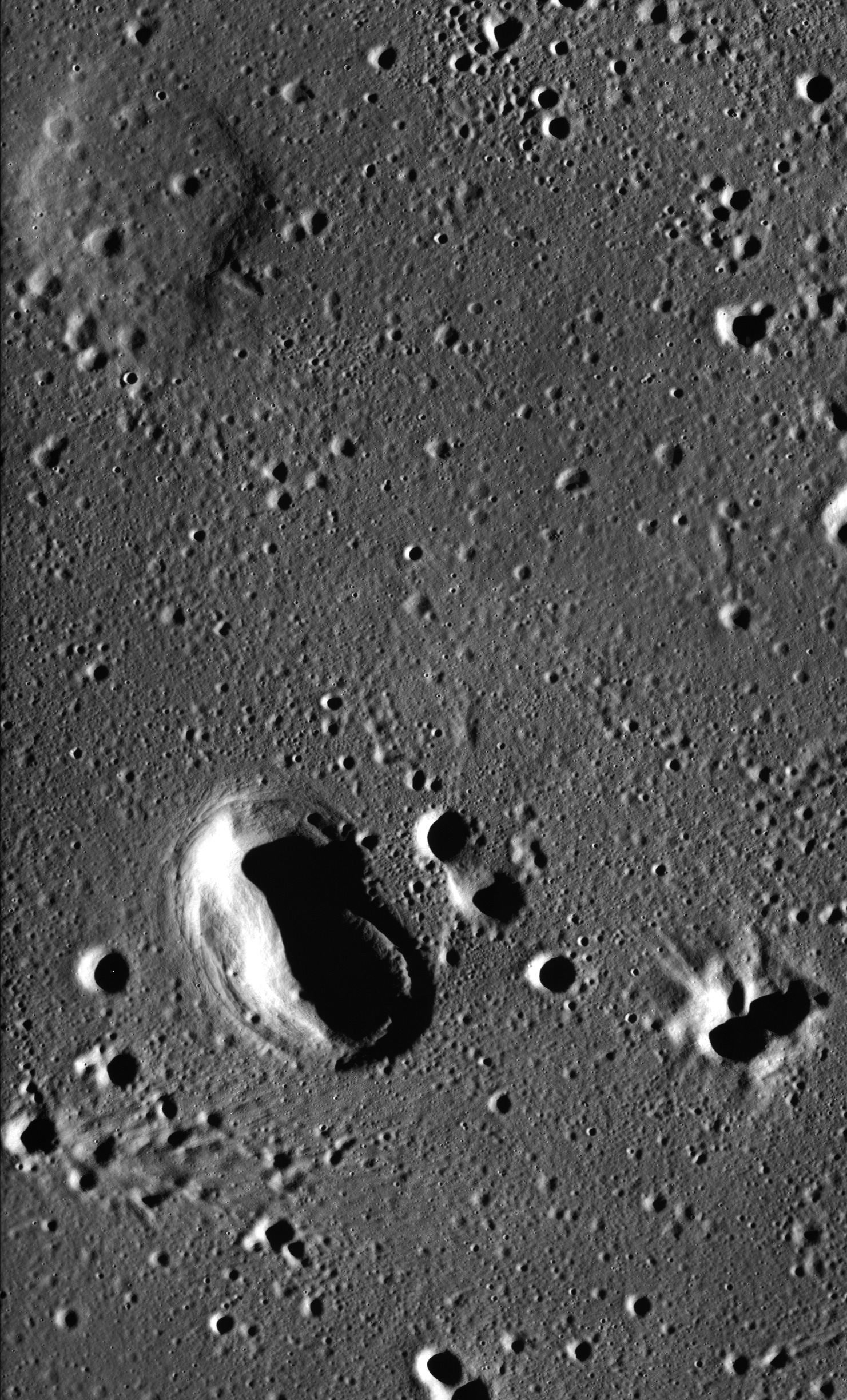
The very young rimless crater near the bottom center of this Apollo 17 image is Brayley G, which is probably a collapse feature rather than an impact crater

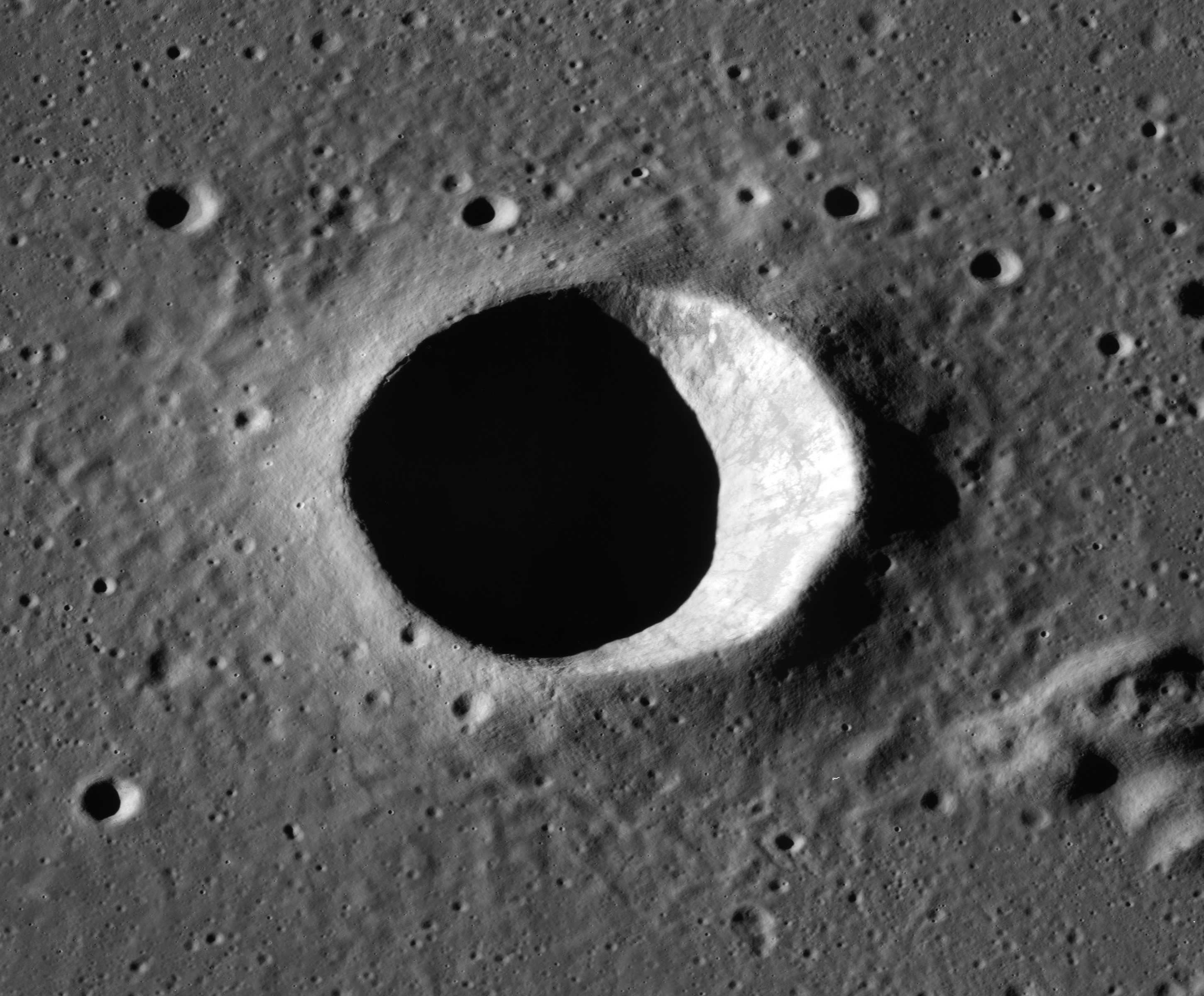
Brayley D crater
