= John Brayley =

British Army officer and wealthy self made businessman (1917-1977)

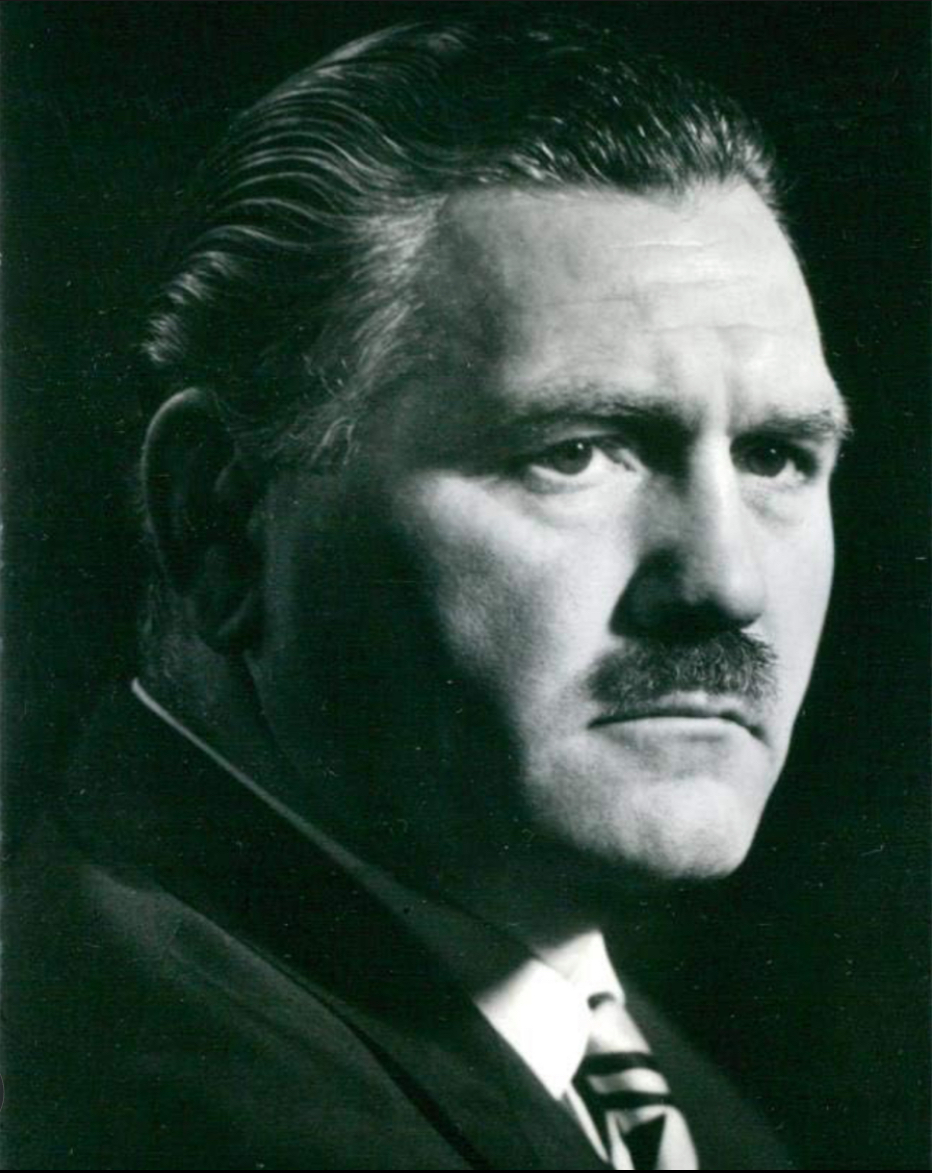

Sir John Brayley, Baron Brayley, MC, DL (29 January 1917 – 16 March 1977) was a British Army officer and wealthy self made businessman and Labour Government Army Minister.

== Army career ==
Brayley was Welsh by birth, having been born in Pontypridd, Glamorgan. He went to the local grammar school. At the age of 17 he joined the Royal Artillery and later became a physical training instructor. He was an enthusiastic boxer and became Army Boxing Champion. During the war he served in the Parachute Regiment, under Major General Frost, winning the Military Cross in 1943 for action in the North African desert campaign. He was part of a unit - a forerunner for today's special forces, set up to train soldiers to parachute behind enemy lines and cause as much disruption to the enemy as possible. He also served in Sicily and Crete and was mentioned in despatches (23 September 1943). Later Brayley held the Honorary rank of Colonel Commandant, Royal Artillery, normally a position reserved for royalty.

== Business and political career ==
In 1946 he joined Phoenix Glass Co Ltd, Bristol which did well through his discovery of markets for its glass bottles. He then moved to manufacturing in Canning Town Glassworks Group, where he became chairman in 1961. He never claimed to know anything about glass, only how to run a team and he built up the company, which made substantial profits for some years.

He shared with George Wigg, Labour's Paymaster General an enthusiasm for horse-racing and owned several of his own horses. He was introduced to Harold Wilson and they became friends. On the Prime Minister's defeat in 1970 Sir John made his personal chauffeur, Rolls-Royce and London home available to Harold Wilson, who later recommended Brayley for a Knighthood. On 22 June 1973 Sir John was created a life peer as Baron Brayley of the City of Cardiff in the County of Glamorgan.

He was awarded government office in March 1974 as Under-Secretary of State for the Army. At this point he resigned as chairman of his company, and sold his shares for over £1million. After inquiries were made into a company with which he had once been involved, he signed a letter of resignation rather than cause the Prime Minister any embarrassment. Despite an initial but extensive enquiry into his business dealings nothing was ever proved before his death in 1977

He became a Deputy Lieutenant for Greater London in 1970, was a justice of the peace for Middlesex, and at one time chairman and trustee of the Saints and Sinners Club in London.

== Lifestyle ==
Brayley was a wealthy self-made man who lived in some style and had the penthouse at Arlington House, Piccadilly, and also lived at Hailey House, a country house in Ipsden, Oxfordshire. He enjoyed returning to Cardiff for social occasions and to watch Wales play rugby from the balcony of his apartment. He was a keen yachtsman and owned 'Natalie' a 527 tonne, 177-foot classic motor yacht. He was also a keen angler, and civilian air pilot.

Despite his considerable wealth he never forgot his roots and was deeply affected by the poverty surrounding him when he grew up in Rhydyfelin as a boy.

== Philanthropy ==
As well as being a Freemason, he was on the board of The Royal Artillery Association and was a member of The Grand Order of Water Rats, the show business charity organisation. He was a Freeman of the City of London, a fellow of the Royal Society of Arts, Patron of the Royal Masonic Hospital

== Death ==
Lord Brayley died in Cardiff after a short illness in March 1977 aged 60. His marriage was dissolved in 1960. He is survived by two daughters, two grandsons and four great grand daughters.
