= John Roberton (born 1776) =

John Roberton

John Roberton (1776 – 1840) was a Scottish physician and social reformer. A radical and fringe figure in the medical profession, he is best remembered for advocating the founding of a medical police to promote health and social welfare and for authoring a book that became the centre of a notorious legal case.

== Life ==
Roberton was born in Hamilton, Lanarkshire, the eldest of four children to a modest family. By 1799 he was in Edinburgh attending medical lectures though he seems never to have graduated. He was admitted to the Royal Medical Society which suggests that he enjoyed the support of a patron. His early published scientific papers on blisters, catarrh and cantharides already suggest that he nurtured unconventional views. Though he seems to have practised under the supervision of a senior doctor until 1802, he then established himself independently as a general practitioner. He specialised in the treatment of sexually transmitted diseases and was a single-minded advocate of the use of cantharides. In 1809 Roberton published A Treatise on Medical Police, and on Diet, Regimen, &c.. He was fond of controversy and became involved in many undignified disputes, including that between the rival rites of freemasonry. His conduct was eventually adjudged "disgraceful" by the Royal Medical Society and he was expelled, departing for London in 1810.

On arrival in London, he started to finalise his work on the pathology of the reproductive system, On Diseases of the Generative System and asked Matthew Baillie to accept the dedication of the book. In the book, Roberton had criticised the methods of Sir Everard Home, a relative of Baillie's, and Baillie balked at accepting the dedication. Further, the book made no pretension of being a scientific work. As Roberton asserted in the introduction, "In this work, no tedious, uninteresting investigation will be entered into; it will be purely practical and suited to readers in general." Another undignified exchange of correspondence followed. Owing to his reputation and the somewhat sensational nature of the work along with its explicit illustrations, Roberton had some difficulty in finding a publisher. The book was eventually published by John Joseph Stockdale, who himself had something of the reputation of a pornographer, further enhancing its notoriety. Stockdale guaranteed the salacious reputation of the work when he published further editions, himself interpolating still more sensational illustrations. After a well-thumbed copy of the book was discovered by prison inspectors in Newgate Prison in 1839, the book became the centre of the important defamation case of Stockdale v. Hansard.

Roberton was again disgraced but seems to have maintained a prosperous household in St. James's Park on the revenue from Generative System and some private practice. Practice by unlicensed and unqualified physicians was not proscribed by law until the Medical Act 1858. In 1821, under the pseudonym T. Bell MD, he published, again through Stockdale, Kalogynomia, or the Laws of Female Beauty.

== Bibliography ==
=== By Roberton ===
- Roberton, J. (1809). A Treatise on Medical Police, and on Diet, Regimen, &c. Edinburgh: J. Moir. "john roberton medical police." (Google Books)
- On Diseases of the Generative System. London: T. Little. 1811.
- Bell, T. [J. Roberton] (1821). Kalogynomia, or the Laws of Female Beauty. London: T. Little.

=== About Roberton ===
- [Anon.] (1857) "J. Roberton", Lowndes Bibliographers' Manual
- McGrath, R. (2002). Seeing Her Sex: Medical Archives and the Female Body. Manchester: Manchester University Press. pp. Ch.2. ISBN 0-7190-4167-8. (Google Books)
- White, B. M. (1 October 1983). "Medical police. Politics and police: the fate of John Roberton". Medical History. 27 (4): 407–422. doi:10.1017/s0025727300043416. PMC 1140047. PMID 6358727.
