= Laying before the house =

Recognise document as available to read

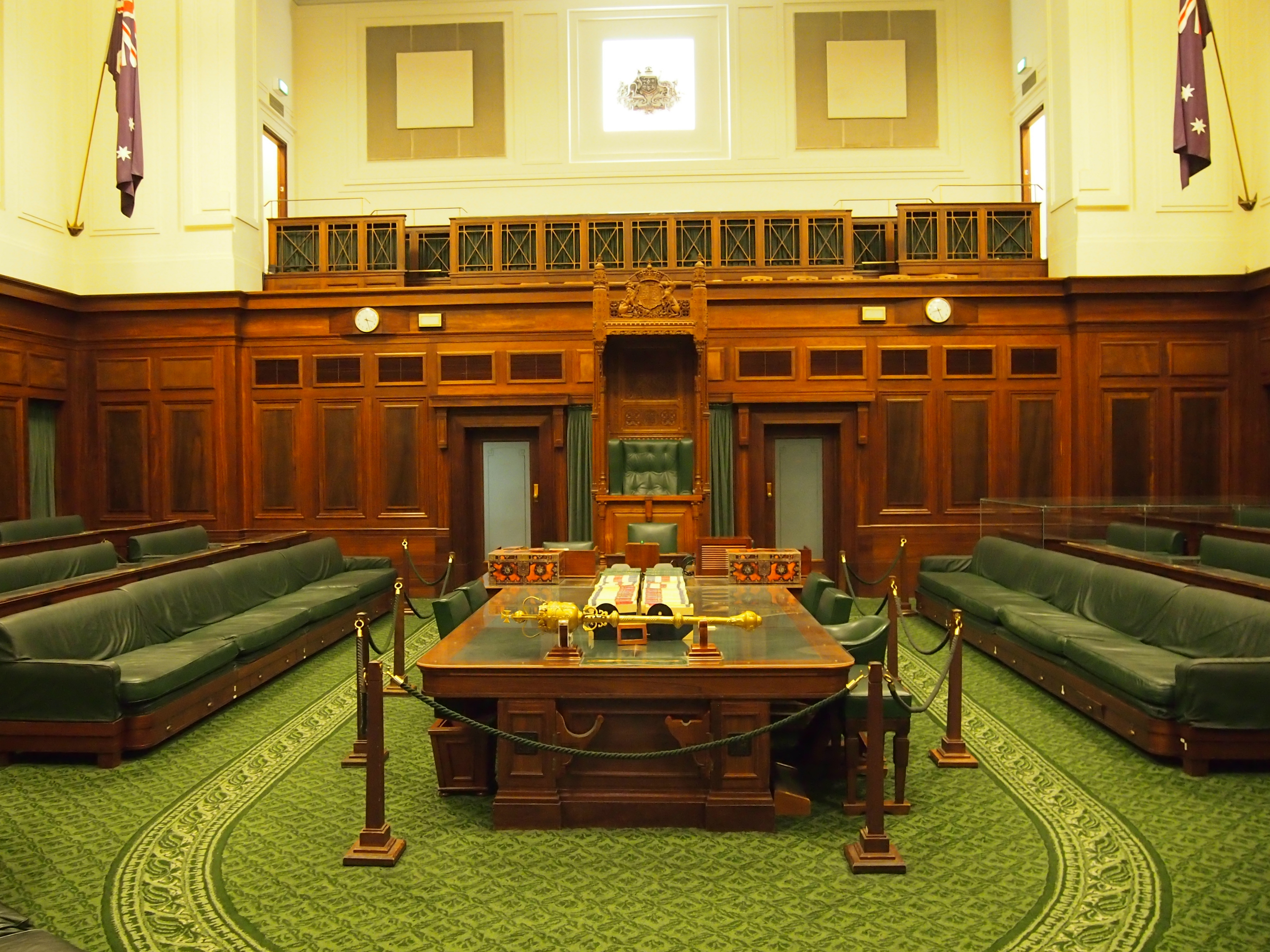
The Australian House of Representatives chamber at Old Parliament House in Canberra. The Table of the House is in the centre, upon which the ceremonial mace is placed.

In parliamentary procedure, especially the Westminster system, a document is laid before the house or laid on the Table of the House when it is formally recognised as having been made available for members of a deliberative assembly to read. Documents produced by official bodies or in response to orders from parliament are required to be laid before the house. These documents inform members in their deliberations.

Originally, a physical copy of the document was placed on the table in the assembly chamber. This is no longer the case, with statutes and rules of order determining the mode by which a document is recognised as having been laid. Some such documents are published, as for example the command papers issued by the UK Parliament. Others may not be published. Electronic publishing is common for documents laid in recent decades. Parliamentary privilege may extend to documents published; the Parliamentary Papers Act 1840 provided this for UK papers. The Irish Department of Finance guidelines state, "It should be especially noted that documents to be laid before the Houses of Oireachtas must not be published before being so laid. A breach of this direction is a serious infringement of parliamentary privilege."
