= John Joseph Stockdale =

British publisher (1770/76/77 - 1847)

John Joseph Stockdale

John Joseph Stockdale (1770, 1776 or 1777 – 16 February 1847) was an English publisher and editor with something of a reputation as a pornographer. He sought to blackmail a number of public figures over the memoirs of society courtesan Harriette Wilson, drawing the notorious retort from the Duke of Wellington, "Publish and be damned!" He also famously sued the parliamentary reporter Hansard over an allegation that he had published an indecent book and became involved in an important constitutional clash between parliament and the courts that ultimately brought about a change in the law.

== Publisher ==
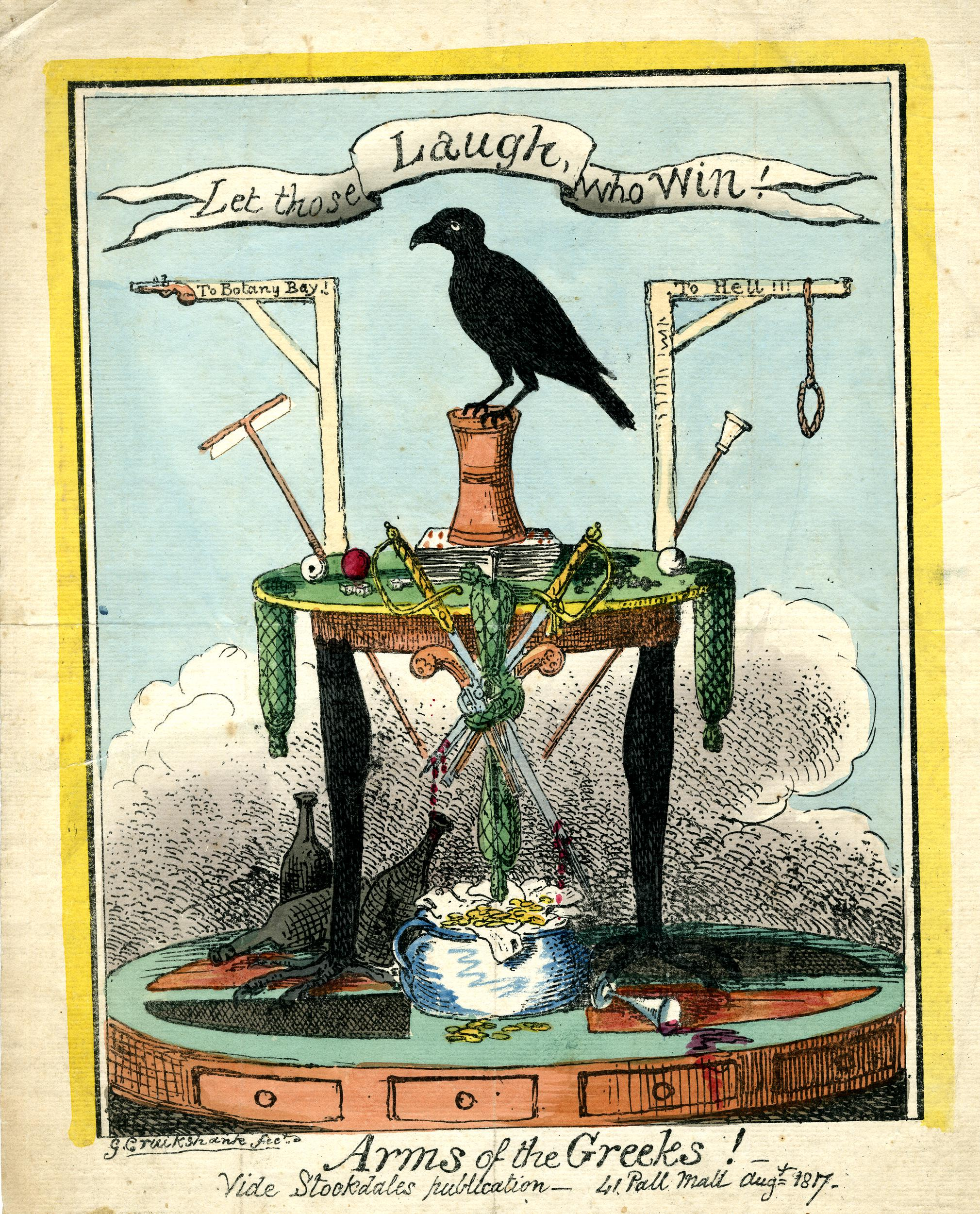
"Arms of the Greeks" 1817. Print made by: George Cruikshank Published by: John Joseph Stockdale

The son of John Stockdale and Mary née Ridgway, John Joseph was brother to Mary Stockdale. He was educated privately at the Aspley Guise Classical Academy in Bedfordshire and in 1793 started to work for his father, being admitted to the freedom of the Worshipful Company of Stationers and Newspaper Makers on 3 August 1802, and afterwards taking up the livery. In 1805 he married Sophia, a niece of Philip Box a successful banker, and he established his own business in Pall Mall in 1806, possibly with financial help from Box. He compiled and edited many books, including:

- Richard Wellesley's Events and Transactions in India (1805);
- Eaton Stannard Barrett's All the Talents: A Satirical Poem (1806);
- Don Pedro Cevallos's Usurpation of the Crown of Spain (1808) and Sketches Civil and Military of the Island of Java (1811); and
- Percy Bysshe Shelley's second novel St. Irvyne; or, The Rosicrucian, A Romance (1810; reprinted in 1822).

Bill by J. J. Stockdale advertising a portrait of Wilson and works by Roberton

Stockdale also sold copies of Original Poetry by Victor and Cazire by Percy Bysshe Shelley and his sister Elizabeth in 1810. In 1828, Stockdale, under the pseudonym of Thomas Little published a fifth edition of John Roberton's treatise on the pathology of the reproductive system On Diseases of the Generative System. Roberton was a radical and something of an outsider to the medical profession, and the book's explicit anatomical plates, together with Stockdale's louche reputation, meant that the book attracted some distaste and notoriety. Stockdale had in fact interpolated some additional sensational illustrations. In 1824, again as Thomas Little, Stockdale published The Beauty, Marriage Ceremonies and Intercourse of the Sexes in All Nations; to which is added The New Art of Love (Grounded on Kalogynomia), an augmented edition of Roberton's 1821 book Kalogynomia, or the Laws of Female Beauty, a work that Roberton had himself published under the pseudonym T. Bell.

== Blackmailer ==
Stockdale was the publisher of the notorious Memoirs of Harriette Wilson (1826) which attracted a crowd ten deep outside his shop. Before publication, Stockdale and Wilson wrote to all those lovers and clients named in the book, including Arthur Wellesley, 1st Duke of Wellington and Henry Brougham, 1st Baron Brougham and Vaux, offering them the opportunity to be excluded from the work in exchange for a cash payment. Wellington famously responded with, Publish and be damned.

Stockdale died at Bushey and his wife Sophia seems to have made a further attempt to blackmail Brougham after Stockdale's death.

== Stockdale v. Hansard ==
In 1839, HM Prisons Inspectors discovered a copy of The Generative System of John Roberton, well thumbed by the inmates of Newgate Prison. Official parliamentary reporter Hansard, by order of the House of Commons, printed and published the Report of the Inspectors of Prisons stating that an indecent book published by a Mr. Stockdale was circulating. Stockdale sued for defamation but Hansard’s defence, that the statement was true, succeeded. However, parliament ordered a reprint and Stockdale sued again but this time Hansard was ordered by the House to plead that he had acted under order of the Commons and was protected by parliamentary privilege.

The court of Queen's Bench, led by Lord Denman, unanimously found that Hansard was not protected by privilege and awarded damages to Stockdale, HM Treasury defraying Hansard's costs. However, when the Middlesex sheriffs attempted to enforce the court order, Hansard fell back upon parliament for protection. Accordingly the sheriffs and other persons who sought to carry out the orders issued by the law court against the Hansards were imprisoned by order of the House of Commons. These protracted and vexatious proceedings were brought to a close only by the passing of the Parliamentary Papers Act 1840 by which it was enacted that proceedings, criminal or civil, against persons for the publication of papers printed by order of either house of parliament shall be stayed upon the production of a certificate to that effect. Stockdale was thus finally defeated, and the printer was indemnified.
