= Edward William Brayley =

English geographer and author (1801–1870)

Edward William Brayley FRS
- Born: 1801; London, England
- Died: 1 February 1870 (aged 68–69); London, England
- Occupations: Librarian, Geographer
- Title: FRS (1 June 1854)
- Father: Edward Wedlake Brayley

Edward William Brayley FRS (1801 – 1 February 1870) was an English geographer, librarian, and science author.

== Early life ==
Brayley was born in London, the son of Edward Wedlake Brayley, a notable antiquary, and his wife Anne (c. 1771–1850). His early schooling, in the company of his brothers Henry and Horatio was private and sheltered. His upbringing was austere with little contact with other children or the world outside his home. He later studied at the London Institution and the Royal Institution under William Thomas Brande.

Brayley abandoned an early inclination to follow his father's interests for science. He published on diverse topics in several scientific journals including the Philosophical Magazine, for which he became an editorial assistant between 1823 and 1844. In 1829 and 1830, Brayley was employed by Rowland Hill to lecture on the physical sciences at his schools as Hazelwood, Edgbaston, Birmingham and Bruce Castle, Tottenham, London.

== Librarian and lecturer ==
In 1834, he became librarian of the London Institution and in 1865 professor of physical geography. He lectured there on diverse subjects and also at the Royal Institution, the London Mechanics' Institute, and the Belgrave, Russell, and Marylebone Institutions. As a staff member of the London Institution he was often called on at the last minute to substitute for an indisposed lecturer and his talks included:

- Meteors and meteorology;
- Mineralogy;
- Physical geography;
- Peat;
- "Metalliferous deposits";
- "Recent eclipses";
- "Lord Rosse's telescopes";
- "Hall's condensing apparatus";
- The remains at Pompeii; and
- Photogenic drawing.

== Editor ==
Most of his scientific work involved the analysis and synthesis of the published ideas of others. Brayley worked on the publication of Samuel Parkes's Chemical Catechism (1834) and contributed many biographical and scientific articles to the English Cyclopaedia. Brayley was a close collaborator and friend of William Robert Grove and notably worked with him on the publication of Groves's seminal book on the conservation of energy, On the Correlation of Physical Forces (1846). He also assisted in the editing of Luke Howard's Barometrographia (1847).

== Marriage and family ==
He married on 9 August 1832 to Judith May (1800–1869), the daughter of Richard May, a portrait painter. She was the widow of James Hodgetts (d1830), and his step-son James Frederick Hodgetts (1828–1906) lived with them while growing up. Edward prepared him in a scientific career, which did not suit him and he joined the Indian Navy and later was a Prof. of seamanship in Berlin and St. Petersburg.

== Offices and honours ==
- Founder member of the Zoological Society;
- Founder member of the Chemical Society;
- Corresponding member of the Societas Naturae Scrutatorum at Basel;
- Member of the American Philosophical Society;
- Member of the London Electrical Society
- Member of the British Meteorological Society, (1850);
- Fellow of the Royal Society, (1854);
- The lunar crater Brayley is named for him;
- Ferdinand von Mueller named the Australian rainforest tree, Flindersia brayleyana in his honour.

== Bibliography ==
- The 1850 and 1851 Membership Lists of the British Meteorological Society

- Brayley, E. W. (1825). Ancient Castles of England and Wales (2 vols ed.).
- The Utility of the Knowledge of Nature Considered; with Reference to the General Education of Youth. London: Baldwin & Cradock. 1831.
- Hays, J. N. (2004) "Brayley, Edward William (1801/2–1870)", Oxford Dictionary of National Biography, Oxford University Press, accessed 8 August 2007 (subscription required)
