= Edward Wedlake Brayley =

English historian and topographer (1773–1854)

Edward Wedlake Brayley FSA
- Born: 1773; Lambeth, Surrey, England
- Died: 23 September 1854 (aged 80–81); London, England
- Occupations: Historian and Topographer
- Notable work: The Beauties of England and Wales
- Children: Edward William Brayley

Edward Wedlake Brayley FSA (1773 – 23 September 1854) was an English historian and topographer. Brayley collaborated with his life-long friend, John Britton, on the first 6 volumes of The Beauties of England and Wales.

== Early life ==
Brayley was born at Lambeth, Surrey. He was apprenticed to the enamelling trade, but developed an early interest in literature.

After completing his apprenticeship, Brayley was employed by Henry Bone (later a Royal Academician) to prepare and fire enamelled plates for small pictures in rings and trinkets. Later, when Bone was working on some exceptionally large enamels, Brayley prepared the plates for Bone's use and fired the finished pictures, continuing to do so for some years after he had become eminent as a topographer.

== Career ==
His close friendship with John Britton lasted for sixty-five years. They entered into a literary partnership, and after minor success with songs and plays, they became joint editors of The Beauties of England and Wales, themselves writing many of the volumes.

Having reached an agreement with a publisher, in 1800 Britton and Brayley set off from London through several English counties, and visited every county of North Wales in search of materials for the work. The first volume appeared in 1801, and contained descriptions of Bedfordshire, Berkshire, and Buckinghamshire. Accounts of the other counties followed in alphabetical order. The first six volumes, ending with Herefordshire, were jointly executed by Brayley and Britton, the greater part of the text being supplied by Brayley, while Britton did most of the travelling, correspondence, collecting of books and documents, and dealt with the illustrators and engravers.

Although originally it had been announced that it would be in about six volumes, and finished within three years, The Beauties of England and Wales eventually extended to twenty-five large volumes, published over nearly twenty years. Disagreements between the writers and publishers led to Britton and Brayley's withdrawal from the project, and Brayley's name does not appear in any volumes published after the description of London.

In 1823 he was elected a fellow of the Society of Antiquaries and he was appointed librarian and secretary of the Russell Institution in Great Coram Street in 1825, remaining in the positions until his death. He died in London on 23 September 1854.

== Works ==
His works include:

- Sir Reginalde or the Black Tower (1803)
- Views in Suffolk, Norfolk and Northamptonshire, illustrative of works of Robt. Bloomfield (1806)
- A Concise Account, Historical and Descriptive, of Lambeth Palace (1806)
- Delineations, Historical and Topographical, of the Isle of Thanet and the Cinque Ports (2 vols., 1817 & 1818)
- The History of the Abbey Church of Westminster (2 vols., 1818)
- Topographical Sketches of Brighthelmston (1825)
- Historical and Descriptive Accounts of Theatres of London (1826)
- Londiniana (1829); and a History of Surrey (5 vols., 1841–1848)

== Personal life ==
He was the father of Edward William Brayley, who was a well-known geographer, librarian, and science author.

== Death ==
Brayley died on 23 September 1854.
