= Parliamentary Papers Act 1840 =

Act of the Parliament of the United Kingdom

Parliamentary Papers Act 1840 (Note: The citation of this act by this short title was authorised by section 1 of, and the first schedule to, the Short Titles Act 1896. Due to the repeal of those provisions it is now authorised by section 19(2) of the Interpretation Act 1978.)
- Act of Parliament
- Parliament of the United Kingdom
- Long title: An Act to give summary Protection to Persons employed in the Publication of Parliamentary Papers.
- Citation: 3 & 4 Vict. c. 9
- Territorial extent: United Kingdom

Dates
- Royal assent: 14 April 1840
- Commencement: 14 April 1840 (Note: The Acts of Parliament (Commencement) Act 1793.)

Other legislation
- Amended by: Defamation Act 1952; Statute Law Revision Act 1958; Broadcasting Act 1990; Constitutional Reform Act 2005

Status: Amended

Text of statute as originally enacted

Revised text of statute as amended

Text of the Parliamentary Papers Act 1840 as in force today (including any amendments) within the United Kingdom, from legislation.gov.uk.

The Parliamentary Papers Act 1840 (3 & 4 Vict. c. 9) is an act of the Parliament of the United Kingdom. The act was passed in response to the case of Stockdale v Hansard where it was held that the House of Commons enjoyed no privilege as to publications under its authority circulated beyond Members of Parliament.

== Provisions ==
The act provides that:

- Publications under the House's authority enjoy absolute privilege against civil or criminal proceedings (s.1);
- Correct copies of such publications also enjoy absolute privilege (s.2);
- Extracts are protected by qualified privilege. The burden of proof is on the defendant to show that the publication was without malice (s.3).

Publication for circulation among Members of Parliament is protected by absolute privilege under common law. The Act received royal assent on 14 April 1840.

The act is notable by being ex post facto – it changes the legal status of happenings before the act was passed. As such, it is a precedent showing that Parliament has sovereignty over the past as well as the future.

== Subsequent developments ==
In section 3 of the act, the words "under the general issue" were repealed by section 3 of, and the third schedule to, the Statute Law Revision Act 1958 (6 & 7 Eliz. 2. c. 46), which came into force on 23 July 1958.

== See also ==
- Defamation Act 1952, s. 9(1): extends the privilege to publication by "wireless telegraphy" (a legal term-of-art extending to radio and terrestrial television transmissions)
- Broadcasting Act 1990, s. 203(1): extends the privilege to "inclusion in a programme service" (i.e. including satellite and cable television)
- Defamation Act 1996, s. 15: extends the privilege to any "fair and accurate report of proceedings"

== Bibliography ==
- Bradley, A. W. & Ewing, K. D. (2003). Constitutional and Administrative Law (13th ed.). London: Pearson. pp. 219–220. ISBN 0582438071.
