= Defamation =

Communication causing harm to reputation

Defamation is a communication that injures a third party's reputation and causes a legally redressable injury. The precise legal definition of defamation varies from country to country. It is not necessarily restricted to making assertions that are false, and can extend to concepts that are more abstract than reputation such as dignity and honour.

In the English-speaking world, the law of defamation traditionally distinguishes between libel (written, printed, posted online, published in mass media) and slander (oral speech). It is treated as a civil wrong (tort, delict), as a criminal offence, or both.

Defamation and related laws can encompass a variety of acts (from general defamation and insult—as applicable to every citizen—to specialized provisions covering specific entities and social structures): Defamation can be against a legal person in general, including an insult against a legal person in general, or acts against public officials, state institutions (government, ministries, government agencies, armed forces), state symbols, the state itself, heads of state, religions (blasphemy), or the judiciary or legislature (contempt of court).

== History ==
Defamation law has a long history stretching back to classical antiquity. While defamation has been recognized as an actionable wrong in various forms across historical legal systems and in various moral and religious philosophies, defamation law in contemporary legal systems can primarily be traced back to Roman and early English law.

Roman law was aimed at giving sufficient scope for the discussion of a man's character, while it protected him from needless insult and pain. The remedy for verbal defamation was long confined to a civil action for a monetary penalty, which was estimated according to the significance of the case, and which, although punitive in its character, doubtless included practically the element of compensation. But a new remedy was introduced with the extension of the criminal law, under which many kinds of defamation were punished with great severity. At the same time increased importance attached to the publication of defamatory books and writings, the libri or libelli famosi, from which is derived the modern use of the word libel; and under the later emperors the latter term came to be specially applied to anonymous accusations or pasquils, the dissemination of which was regarded as particularly dangerous, and visited with very severe punishment, whether the matters contained in them were true or false.

The Praetorian Edict, codified circa AD 130, declared that an action could be brought up for shouting at someone contrary to good morals: "qui, adversus bonos mores convicium cui fecisse cuiusve opera factum esse dicitur, quo adversus bonos mores convicium fieret, in eum iudicium dabo." (English: "against anyone who is said to have made an abusive outcry contrary to good morals, or by whose agency it is said to have been done, whereby an abusive outcry contrary to good morals was made, I will bring judgment against that person.") In this case, the offence was constituted by the unnecessary act of shouting. According to Ulpian, not all shouting was actionable. Drawing on the argument of Labeo, he asserted that the offence consisted in shouting contrary to the morals of the city ("adversus bonos mores huius civitatis") something apt to bring in disrepute or contempt ("quae... ad infamiam vel invidiam alicuius spectaret") the person exposed thereto. Any act apt to bring another person into disrepute gave rise to an actio injurarum. In such a case the truth of the statements was no justification for the public and insulting manner in which they had been made, but, even in public matters, the accused had the opportunity to justify his actions by openly stating what he considered necessary for public safety to be denounced by the libel and proving his assertions to be true. The second head included defamatory statements made in private, and in this case the offence lay in the content of the imputation, not in the manner of its publication. The truth was therefore a sufficient defence, for no man had a right to demand legal protection for a false reputation.

In Anglo-Saxon England, whose legal tradition is the predecessor of contemporary common law jurisdictions, slander was punished by cutting out the tongue. Historically, while defamation of a commoner in England was known as libel or slander, the defamation of a member of the English aristocracy was called scandalum magnatum, literally "the scandal of magnates".

== Human rights ==
Following the Second World War and with the rise of contemporary international human rights law, the right to a legal remedy for defamation was included in Article 17 of the United Nations International Covenant on Civil and Political Rights (ICCPR), which states that:

1. No one shall be subjected to arbitrary or unlawful interference with his privacy, family, home or correspondence, nor to unlawful attacks on his honour and reputation.
2. Everyone has the right to the protection of the law against such interference or attacks.

This implies a right to legal protection against defamation; however, this right co-exists with the right to freedom of opinion and expression under Article 19 of the ICCPR as well as Article 19 of the Universal Declaration of Human Rights. Article 19 of the ICCPR expressly provides that the right to freedom of opinion and expression may be limited so far as it is necessary "for respect of the rights or reputations of others". Consequently, international human rights law provides that while individuals should have the right to a legal remedy for defamation, this right must be balanced with the equally protected right to freedom of opinion and expression. In general, ensuring that domestic defamation law adequately balances individuals' right to protect their reputation with freedom of expression and of the press entails:

- Providing for truth (i.e., demonstrating that the content of the defamatory statement is true) to be a valid defence,
- Recognizing reasonable publication on matters of public concern as a valid defence, and
- Ensuring that defamation may only be addressed by the legal system as a tort.

In most of Europe, article 10 of the European Convention on Human Rights permits restrictions on freedom of speech when necessary to protect the reputation or rights of others. Additionally, restrictions of freedom of expression and other rights guaranteed by international human rights laws (including the European Convention on Human Rights (ECHR)) and by the constitutions of a variety of countries are subject to some variation of the three-part test recognized by the United Nations Human Rights Committee which requires that limitations be: 1) "provided by law that is clear and accessible to everyone", 2) "proven to be necessary and legitimate to protect the rights or reputations of others", and 3) "proportionate and the least restrictive to achieve the purported aim". This test is analogous to the Oakes Test applied domestically by the Supreme Court of Canada in assessing whether limitations on constitutional rights are "demonstrably justifiable in a free and democratic society" under Section 1 of the Canadian Charter of Rights and Freedoms, the "necessary in a democratic society" test applied by the European Court of Human Rights in assessing limitations on rights under the ECHR, Section 36 of the post-Apartheid Constitution of South Africa, and Section 24 of the 2010 Constitution of Kenya. Nevertheless, the worldwide use of criminal and civil defamation, to censor, intimidate or silence critics, has been increasing in recent years.

=== General comment No. 34 ===
In 2011, the United Nations Human Rights Committee published their General comment No. 34 (CCPR/C/GC/34)—regarding Article 19 of the ICCPR.

Paragraph 47 states:

Defamation laws must be crafted with care to ensure that they comply with paragraph 3 [of Article 19 of the ICCPR], and that they do not serve, in practice, to stifle freedom of expression. All such laws, in particular penal defamation laws, should include such defences as the defence of truth and they should not be applied with regard to those forms of expression that are not, of their nature, subject to verification. At least with regard to comments about public figures, consideration should be given to avoiding penalizing or otherwise rendering unlawful untrue statements that have been published in error but without malice. In any event, a public interest in the subject matter of the criticism should be recognized as a defence. Care should be taken by States parties to avoid excessively punitive measures and penalties. Where relevant, States parties should place reasonable limits on the requirement for a defendant to reimburse the expenses of the successful party. States parties should consider the decriminalization of defamation and, in any case, the application of the criminal law should only be countenanced in the most serious of cases and imprisonment is never an appropriate penalty. It is impermissible for a State party to indict a person for criminal defamation but then not to proceed to trial expeditiously—such a practice has a chilling effect that may unduly restrict the exercise of freedom of expression of the person concerned and others.

== Defamation as a tort ==
While each legal tradition approaches defamation differently, it is typically regarded as a tort (Note: In some, but not all, civil and mixed law jurisdictions, the term delict is used to refer to this category of civil wrong, though it can also refer to criminal offences in some jurisdictions and tort is the general term used in comparative law. For instance, despite the common belief that the term "tort" exclusively refers to civil liability in common law jurisdictions, Wikipedia has articles discussing conflict of tort laws, European tort law, and Tort Law in China, only using the term delict in articles about jurisdictions which specifically use the term to refer to torts (e.g., Scots Law of Delict and South African law of delict). Similarly, the English version of the Civil Code of the People's Republic of China, uses the term "tortfeasor" to refer to individuals who incur civil liability.) for which the offended party can take civil action. The range of remedies available to successful plaintiffs in defamation cases varies between jurisdictions and range from damages to court orders requiring the defendant to retract the offending statement or to publish a correction or an apology.

=== Common law ===
==== Background ====
Modern defamation in common law jurisdictions are historically derived from English defamation law. English law allows actions for libel to be brought in the High Court for any published statements alleged to defame a named or identifiable individual or individuals (under English law companies are legal persons, and allowed to bring suit for defamation) in a manner that causes them loss in their trade or profession, or causes a reasonable person to think worse of them.

==== Overview ====
In contemporary common law jurisdictions, to constitute defamation, a claim must generally be false and must have been made to someone other than the person defamed. Some common law jurisdictions distinguish between spoken defamation, called slander, and defamation in other media such as printed words or images, called libel. The fundamental distinction between libel and slander lies solely in the form in which the defamatory matter is published. If the offending material is published in some fleeting form, such as spoken words or sounds, sign language, gestures or the like, then it is slander. In contrast, libel encompasses defamation by written or printed words, pictures, or in any form other than spoken words or gestures. (Note: In recent times, internet publications such as defamatory comments on social media can also constitute libel) The law of libel originated in the 17th century in England. With the growth of publication came the growth of libel and development of the tort of libel. The highest award in an American defamation case, at US$222.7 million was rendered in 1997 against Dow Jones in favour of MMAR Group Inc; however, the verdict was dismissed in 1999 amid allegations that MMAR failed to disclose audiotapes made by its employees.

In common law jurisdictions, civil lawsuits alleging defamation have frequently been used by both private businesses and governments to suppress and censor criticism. A notable example of such lawsuits being used to suppress political criticism of a government is the use of defamation claims by politicians in Singapore's ruling People's Action Party to harass and suppress opposition leaders such as J. B. Jeyaretnam. Over the first few decades of the twenty first century, the phenomenon of strategic lawsuits against public participation has gained prominence in many common law jurisdictions outside Singapore as activists, journalists, critics of corporations, political leaders, and public figures are increasingly targeted with vexatious defamation litigation. As a result, tort reform measures have been enacted in various jurisdictions; the California Code of Civil Procedure and Ontario's Protection of Public Participation Act do so by enabling defendants to make a special motion to strike or dismiss during which discovery is suspended and which, if successful, would terminate the lawsuit and allow the party to recover its legal costs from the plaintiff.

==== Defences ====
There are a variety of defences to defamation claims in common law jurisdictions. The two most fundamental defences arise from the doctrine in common law jurisdictions that only a false statement of fact (as opposed to opinion) can be defamatory. This doctrine gives rise to two separate but related defences: opinion and truth. Statements of opinion cannot be regarded as defamatory as they are inherently non-falsifiable. (Note: While this holds true in the majority of common law jurisdictions, particularly in the Commonwealth, a number of common law jurisdictions no longer recognize any legal distinction between fact and opinion. The Supreme Court of the United States, in particular, has ruled that the First Amendment does not require recognition of an opinion privilege.) Where a statement has been shown to be one of fact rather than opinion, the most common defence in common law jurisdictions is that of truth. Proving the truth of an allegedly defamatory statement is always a valid defence. Where a statement is partially true, certain jurisdictions in the Commonwealth have provided by statute that the defence "shall not fail by reason only that the truth of every charge is not proved if the words not proved to be true do not materially injure the claimant's reputation having regard to the truth of the remaining charges". Similarly, the American doctrine of substantial truth provides that a statement is not defamatory if it has "slight inaccuracies of expression" but is otherwise true. Since a statement can only be defamatory if it harms another person's reputation, another defence tied to the ability of a statement to be defamatory is to demonstrate that, regardless of whether the statement is true or is a statement of fact, it does not actually harm someone's reputation.

It is also necessary in these cases to show that there is a well-founded public interest in the specific information being widely known, and this may be the case even for public figures. Public interest is generally not "what the public is interested in", but rather "what is in the interest of the public".

Other defences recognized in one or more common law jurisdictions include:

- Privilege: A circumstance that justifies or excuses an act that would otherwise constitute a tort on the ground that it stemmed from a recognized interest of social importance, provides a complete bar and answer to a defamation suit, though conditions may have to be met before this protection is granted. While some privileges have long been recognized, courts may create a new privilege for particular circumstances—privilege as an affirmative defence is a potentially ever-evolving doctrine. Such newly created or circumstantially recognized privileges are referred to as residual justification privileges. There are two types of privilege in common law jurisdictions:
  - Absolute privilege has the effect that a statement cannot be sued on as defamatory, even if it were made maliciously; a typical example is evidence given in court (although this may give rise to different claims, such as an action for malicious prosecution or perjury) or statements made in a session of the legislature by a member thereof (known as 'Parliamentary privilege' in Commonwealth countries).
  - Qualified privilege: A more limited, or 'qualified', form of privilege may be available to journalists as a defence in circumstances where it is considered important that the facts be known in the public interest; an example would be public meetings, local government documents, and information relating to public bodies such as the police and fire departments. Another example would be that a professor—acting in good faith and honesty—may write an unsatisfactory letter of reference with unsatisfactory information.
- Mistake of fact: Statements made in a good faith and reasonable belief that they were true are generally treated the same as true statements; however, the court may inquire into the reasonableness of the belief. The degree of care expected will vary with the nature of the defendant: an ordinary person might safely rely on a single newspaper report, while the newspaper would be expected to carefully check multiple sources.
- Mere vulgar abuse: An insult that is not necessarily defamatory if it is not intended to be taken literally or believed, or likely to cause real damage to a reputation. Vituperative statements made in anger, such as calling someone "an arse" during a drunken argument, would likely be considered mere vulgar abuse and not defamatory.
- Fair comment: Statements made with an honest belief in their soundness on a matter of public interest (such as regarding official acts) are defendable against a defamation claim, even if such arguments are logically unsound; if a reasonable person could honestly entertain such an opinion, the statement is protected.
- Consent: In rare cases, a defendant can argue that the plaintiff consented to the dissemination of the statement.
- Innocent dissemination: A defendant is not liable if they had no actual knowledge of the defamatory statement or no reason to believe the statement was defamatory. Thus, a delivery service cannot be held liable for delivering a sealed defamatory letter. The defence can be defeated if the lack of knowledge was due to negligence.
- Incapability of further defamation: Historically, it was a defence at common law that the claimant's position in the community is so poor that defamation could not do further damage to the plaintiff. Such a claimant could be said to be "libel-proof", since in most jurisdictions, actual damage is an essential element for a libel claim. Essentially, the defence was that the person had such a bad reputation before the libel, that no further damage could possibly have been caused by the making of the statement.
- Statute of limitations: Most jurisdictions require that a lawsuit be brought within a limited period of time. If the alleged libel occurs in a mass media publication such as a newspaper or the Internet, the statute of limitations begins to run at the time of publication, not when the plaintiff first learns of the communication.
- No third-party communication: If an employer were to bring an employee into a sound-proof, isolated room, and accuse him of embezzling company money, the employee would have no defamation recourse, since no one other than the would-be plaintiff and would-be defendant heard the false statement.
- No actual injury: If there is third-party communication, but the third-party hearing the defamatory statement does not believe the statement, or does not care, then there is no injury, and therefore, no recourse.

==== Insurance ====
Media liability or defamation insurance is often purchased by publishers and journalists to cover potential damage awards from libel lawsuits. Roughly 3/4 of all money spent on claims by liability insurers goes to lawyers and only 1/4 goes to settlements or judgments, according to one estimate from Michelle Worrall Tilton of Media Risk Consultants. Some advise buying worldwide coverage that offers defence against cases regardless of where in the world they are filed, since a compainant can look for a more favourable jurisdiction to file their claim. Investigative journalism usually requires higher insurance premiums, with some plans not covering investigative work altogether.

==== Defamation per se ====
Many common law jurisdictions recognize that some categories of statements are considered to be defamatory per se, such that people making a defamation claim for these statements do not need to prove that the statement was defamatory. In an action for defamation per se the law recognizes that certain false statements are so damaging that they create a presumption of injury to the plaintiff's reputation, allowing a defamation case to proceed to verdict with no actual proof of damages. Although laws vary by state, and not all jurisdictions recognize defamation per se, there are four general categories of false statement that typically support a per se action:

1. accusing someone of a crime ("John Smith murdered his wife");
2. alleging that someone has a foul or loathsome disease ("John Smith has AIDS");
3. adversely reflecting on a person's fitness to conduct their business or trade ("John Smith, Esq., doesn't have a valid license to practice law"); and
4. imputing serious sexual misconduct ("John Smith cheated on his wife with his secretary").

If the plaintiff proves that such a statement was made and was false, to recover damages the plaintiff need only prove that someone had made the statement to any third party. No proof of special damages is required. However, to recover full compensation a plaintiff should be prepared to prove actual damages. As with any defamation case, truth remains an absolute defence to defamation per se. This means that even if the statement would be considered defamatory per se if false, if the defendant establishes that it is in fact true, an action for defamation per se cannot survive. The conception of what type of allegation may support an action for defamation per se can evolve with public policy. For example, in May 2012 an appeals court in New York, citing changes in public policy with regard to homosexuality, ruled that describing someone as gay is not defamation.

==== Variations within common law jurisdictions ====
While defamation torts are broadly similar across common law jurisdictions; differences have arisen as a result of diverging case law, statutes and other legislative action, and constitutional concerns (Note: For instance, Section 2 of the Canadian Charter of Rights and Freedoms and the First Amendment to the United States Constitution provide protection for freedom of expression which courts must take into account in developing the case law regarding defamation) specific to individual jurisdictions.

Some jurisdictions have a separate tort or delict of injury, intentional infliction of emotional distress, involving the making of a statement, even if truthful, intended to harm the claimant out of malice; some have a separate tort or delict of "invasion of privacy" in which the making of a true statement may give rise to liability: but neither of these comes under the general heading of "defamation". The tort of harassment created by Singapore's Protection from Harassment Act 2014 is an example of a tort of this type being created by statute. There is also, in almost all jurisdictions, a tort or delict of "misrepresentation", involving the making of a statement that is untrue even though not defamatory. Thus a surveyor who states a house is free from risk of flooding has not defamed anyone, but may still be liable to someone who purchases the house relying on this statement. Other increasingly common claims similar to defamation in U.S. law are claims that a famous trademark has been diluted through tarnishment, see generally trademark dilution, "intentional interference with contract", and "negligent misrepresentation". In America, for example, the unique tort of false light protects plaintiffs against statements which are not technically false but are misleading.

Although laws vary by state; in America, a defamation action typically requires that a plaintiff claiming defamation prove that the defendant:

1. made a false and defamatory statement concerning the plaintiff;
2. shared the statement with a third party (that is, somebody other than the person defamed by the statement);
3. if the defamatory matter is of public concern, acted in a manner which amounted at least to negligence on the part of the defendant; and
4. caused damages to the plaintiff.

Additionally, American courts apply special rules in the case of statements made in the press concerning public figures, which can be used as a defence. While plaintiff alleging defamation in an American court must usually prove that the statement caused harm, and was made without adequate research into the truthfulness of the statement; where the plaintiff is a celebrity or public official, they must additionally prove that the statement was made with actual malice (i.e. the intent to do harm or with reckless disregard for the truth). A series of court rulings led by New York Times Co. v. Sullivan, 376 U.S. 254 (1964) established that for a public official (or other legitimate public figure) to win a libel case in an American court, the statement must have been published knowing it to be false or with reckless disregard to its truth (i.e. actual malice). The Associated Press estimates that 95% of libel cases involving news stories do not arise from high-profile news stories, but "run of the mill" local stories like news coverage of local criminal investigations or trials, or business profiles. An early example of libel is the case of John Peter Zenger in 1735. Zenger was hired to publish the New York Weekly Journal. When he printed another man's article criticizing William Cosby, the royal governor of Colonial New York, Zenger was accused of seditious libel. The verdict was returned as not guilty on the charge of seditious libel, because it was proven that all the statements Zenger had published about Cosby had been true, so there was not an issue of defamation. Another example of libel is the case of New York Times Co. v. Sullivan (1964). The Supreme Court of the United States overruled a state court in Alabama that had found The New York Times guilty of libel for printing an advertisement that criticized Alabama officials for mistreating student civil rights activists. Even though some of what The Times printed was false, the court ruled in its favour, saying that libel of a public official requires proof of actual malice, which was defined as a "knowing or reckless disregard for the truth".

Many jurisdictions within the Commonwealth (e.g. Singapore, Ontario, and the United Kingdom) have enacted legislation to:

- Codify the defences of fair comment and qualified privilege
- Provide that, while most instances of slander continue to require special damage to be proved (i.e. prove that pecuniary loss was caused by the defamatory statement), instances such as slander of title shall not
- Clarify that broadcast statements (including those that are only broadcast in spoken form) constitute libel rather than slander.

Libel law in England and Wales was overhauled even further by the Defamation Act 2013.

Defamation in Indian tort law largely resembles that of England and Wales. Indian courts have endorsed the defences of absolute and qualified privilege, fair comment, and justification. While statutory law in the United Kingdom provides that, if the defendant is only successful in proving the truth of some of the several charges against him, the defence of justification might still be available if the charges not proved do not materially injure the reputation, there is no corresponding provision in India, though it is likely that Indian courts would treat this principle as persuasive precedent. Recently, incidents of defamation in relation to public figures have attracted public attention.

The origins of U.S. defamation law pre-date the American Revolution. (Note: One famous 1734 case involving John Peter Zenger sowed the seed for the later establishment of truth as an absolute defence against libel charges. The outcome of the case is one of jury nullification, and not a case where the defence acquitted itself as a matter of law, as before the Zenger case defamation law had not provided the defence of truth.) Though the First Amendment of the American Constitution was designed to protect freedom of the press, it was primarily envisioned to prevent censorship by the state rather than defamation suits; thus, for most of American history, the Supreme Court did not interpret the First Amendment as applying to libel cases involving media defendants. This left libel laws, based upon the traditional common law of defamation inherited from the English legal system, mixed across the states. The 1964 case New York Times Co. v. Sullivan dramatically altered the nature of libel law in the country by elevating the fault element for public officials to actual malice—that is, public figures could win a libel suit only if they could demonstrate the publisher's "knowledge that the information was false" or that the information was published "with reckless disregard of whether it was false or not". Later the Supreme Court held that statements that are so ridiculous to be clearly not true are protected from libel claims, as are statements of opinion relating to matters of public concern that do not contain a provably false factual connotation. Subsequent state and federal cases have addressed defamation law and the Internet.

American defamation law is much less plaintiff-friendly than its counterparts in European and the Commonwealth countries. A comprehensive discussion of what is and is not libel or slander under American law is difficult, as the definition differs between different states and is further affected by federal law. Some states codify what constitutes slander and libel together, merging the concepts into a single defamation law.

New Zealand received English law with the signing of the Treaty of Waitangi in February 1840. The current Act is the Defamation Act 1992 which came into force on 1 February 1993 and repealed the Defamation Act 1954. New Zealand law allows for the following remedies in an action for defamation: compensatory damages; an injunction to stop further publication; a correction or a retraction; and in certain cases, punitive damages. Section 28 of the Act allows for punitive damages only when a there is a flagrant disregard of the rights of the person defamed. As the law assumes that an individual suffers loss if a statement is defamatory, there is no need to prove that specific damage or loss has occurred. However, Section 6 of the Act allows for a defamation action brought by a corporate body to proceed only when the body corporate alleges and proves that the publication of the defamation has caused or is likely to cause pecuniary loss to that body corporate.

As is the case for most Commonwealth jurisdictions, Canada follows English law on defamation issues (except in Quebec where the private law is derived from French civil law). In common law provinces and territories, defamation covers any communication that tends to lower the esteem of the subject in the minds of ordinary members of the public. Probably true statements are not excluded, nor are political opinions. Intent is always presumed, and it is not necessary to prove that the defendant intended to defame. In Hill v. Church of Scientology of Toronto (1995), the Supreme Court of Canada rejected the actual malice test adopted in the US case New York Times Co. v. Sullivan. Once a claim has been made, the defendant may avail themselves of a defence of justification (the truth), fair comment, responsible communication, or privilege. Publishers of defamatory comments may also use the defence of innocent dissemination where they had no knowledge of the nature of the statement, it was not brought to their attention, and they were not negligent.

==== Corporate defamation ====
Common law jurisdictions vary as to whether they permit corporate plaintiffs in defamation actions. Under contemporary Australian law, private corporations are denied the right to sue for defamation, with an exception for small businesses (corporations with less than 10 employees and no subsidiaries); this rule was introduced by the state of New South Wales in 2003, and then adopted nationwide in 2006. By contrast, Canadian law grants private corporations substantially the same right to sue for defamation as individuals possess. Since 2013, English law charts a middle course, allowing private corporations to sue for defamation, but requiring them to prove that the defamation caused both serious harm and serious financial loss, which individual plaintiffs are not required to demonstrate.

=== Roman Dutch and Scots law ===
Defamation in jurisdictions applying Roman Dutch law (i.e. most of Southern Africa, (Note: The vast majority of southern African states apply Roman Dutch law with regard to their law of obligations, having adopted South African law (which generally applies Roman Dutch private law despite public law deriving from English common law) via reception statute under colonial rule) Indonesia, Suriname, and the Dutch Caribbean) gives rise to a claim by way of "actio iniuriarum". For liability under the actio iniuriarum, the general elements of delict must be present, but specific rules have been developed for each element. Causation, for example, is seldom in issue, and is assumed to be present. The elements of liability under the actio iniuriarum are as follows:

- harm, in the form of a violation of a personality interest (one's corpus, dignitas and fama);
- wrongful conduct; (Note: Conduct usually takes the form of statements, either oral or in writing; nevertheless, other forms of conduct, such as physical contact or gestures, could also arise. The principles are the same as those applicable to the Aquilian action) and
- intention.

Under the actio iniuriarum, harm consists in the infringement of a personality right, either "corpus", "dignitas", or "fama". Dignitas is a generic term meaning 'worthiness, dignity, self-respect', and comprises related concerns like mental tranquillity and privacy. Because it is such a wide concept, its infringement must be serious. Not every insult is humiliating; one must prove contumelia. This includes insult (iniuria in the narrow sense), adultery, loss of consortium, alienation of affection, breach of promise (but only in a humiliating or degrading manner), et cetera. "Fama" is a generic term referring to reputation and actio iniuriarum pertaining to it encompasses defamation more broadly Beyond simply covering actions that fall within the broader concept of defamation, "actio iniuriarum" relating to infringements of a person's corpus provides civil remedies for assaults, acts of a sexual or indecent nature, and 'wrongful arrest and detention'.

In Scots law, which is closely related to Roman Dutch law, the remedy for defamation is similarly the actio iniuriarium and the most common defence is "veritas" (i.e. proving the truth of otherwise defamatory statement). Defamation falls within the realm of non-patrimonial (i.e. dignitary) interests. The Scots law pertaining to the protection of non-patrimonial interests is said to be 'a thing of shreds and patches'. This notwithstanding, there is 'little historical basis in Scots law for the kind of structural difficulties that have restricted English law' in the development of mechanisms to protect so-called 'rights of personality'. The actio iniuriarum heritage of Scots law gives the courts scope to recognize, and afford reparation in, cases in which no patrimonial (or 'quasi-patrimonial') 'loss' has occurred, but a recognized dignitary interest has nonetheless been invaded through the wrongful conduct of the defender. For such reparation to be offered, however, the non-patrimonial interest must be deliberately affronted: negligent interference with a non-patrimonial interest will not be sufficient to generate liability. An actio iniuriarum requires that the conduct of the defender be 'contumelious'—that is, it must show such hubristic disregard of the pursuer's recognized personality interest that an intention to affront (animus iniuriandi) might be imputed.

== Defamation as a crime ==
In addition to tort law, many jurisdictions treat defamation as a criminal offence and provide for penalties as such. Article 19, a British free expression advocacy group, has published global maps charting the existence of criminal defamation law across the globe, as well as showing countries that have special protections for political leaders or functionaries of the state.

There can be regional statutes that may differ from the national norm. For example, in the United States, criminal defamation is generally limited to the living. However, there are 7 states (Idaho, Kansas, Louisiana, Nevada, North Dakota, Oklahoma, Utah) that have criminal statutes regarding defamation of the dead.

The Organization for Security and Co-operation in Europe (OSCE) has also published a detailed database on criminal and civil defamation provisions in 55 countries, including all European countries, all member countries of the Commonwealth of Independent States, America, and Canada.

Questions of group libel have been appearing in common law for hundreds of years. One of the earliest known cases of a defendant being tried for defamation of a group was the case of R v Orme and Nutt (1700). In this case, the jury found that the defendant was guilty of libelling several subjects, though they did not specifically identify who these subjects were. A report of the case told that the jury believed that "where a writing ... inveighs against mankind in general, or against a particular order of men, as for instance, men of the gown, this is no libel, but it must descend to particulars and individuals to make it libel." This jury believed that only individuals who believed they were specifically defamed had a claim to a libel case. Since the jury was unable to identify the exact people who were being defamed, there was no cause to identify the statements were a libel.

Another early English group libel which has been frequently cited is King v. Osborne (1732). In this case, the defendant was on trial "for printing a libel reflecting upon the Portuguese Jews". The printing in question claimed that Jews who had arrived in London from Portugal burned a Jewish woman to death when she had a child with a Christian man, and that this act was common. Following Osborne's anti-Semitic publication, several Jews were attacked. Initially, the judge seemed to believe the court could do nothing since no individual was singled out by Osborne's writings. However, the court concluded that "since the publication implied the act was one Jews frequently did, the whole community of Jews was defamed." Though various reports of this case give differing accounts of the crime, this report clearly shows a ruling based on group libel. Since laws restricting libel were accepted at this time because of its tendency to lead to a breach of peace, group libel laws were justified because they showed potential for an equal or perhaps greater risk of violence. For this reason, group libel cases are criminal even though most libel cases are civil torts.

In a variety of Common Law jurisdictions, criminal laws prohibiting protests at funerals, sedition, false statements in connection with elections, and the use of profanity in public, are also often used in contexts similar to criminal libel actions. The boundaries of a court's power to hold individuals in "contempt of court" for what amounts to alleged defamatory statements about judges or the court process by attorneys or other people involved in court cases is also not well established in many common law countries.

=== Criticism ===
While defamation torts are less controversial as they ostensibly involve plaintiffs seeking to protect their right to dignity and their reputation, criminal defamation is more controversial as it involves the state expressly seeking to restrict freedom of expression. Human rights organizations, and other organizations such as the Council of Europe and Organization for Security and Co-operation in Europe, have campaigned against strict defamation laws that criminalize defamation. The freedom of expression advocacy group Article 19 opposes criminal defamation, arguing that civil defamation laws providing defences for statements on matters of public interest are better compliant with international human rights law. The European Court of Human Rights has placed restrictions on criminal libel laws because of the freedom of expression provisions of the European Convention on Human Rights. One notable case was Lingens v. Austria (1986).

== Laws by jurisdiction ==
=== Summary table ===
Criminal defamation laws by country
Country	General offences	Special offences	Custodial sentences
Albania	Yes	No	No
Andorra	Yes	Yes	Yes
Armenia	No	Unclear	Unclear
Austria	Yes	Yes	Yes
Azerbaijan	Yes	Yes	Yes
Belarus	Yes	Yes	Yes
Belgium	Yes	Yes	Yes
Bosnia and Herzegovina	No	No	No
Bulgaria	Yes	Yes	No
Canada	Yes	Yes	Yes
Croatia	Yes	Yes	Yes
Cyprus	No	Yes	Yes
Czech Republic	Yes	No	Yes
Denmark	Yes	Yes	Yes
Estonia	No	Yes	Yes
Finland	Yes	Yes	Yes
France	Yes	Yes	No
Georgia	No	Unclear	Unclear
Germany	Yes	Yes	Yes
Greece	Yes	Yes	Yes
Hungary	Yes	No	Yes
Iceland	Yes	Yes	Yes
India	Yes	Yes	Yes
Ireland	No	No	No
Italy	Yes	Yes	Yes
Japan	Yes	Yes	Yes
Kazakhstan	Yes	Yes	Yes
Kyrgyzstan	No	No	No
Latvia	Yes	No	Yes
Liechtenstein	Yes	Yes	Yes
Lithuania	Yes	No	Yes
Luxembourg	Yes	Yes	Yes
Malta	Yes	Yes	Yes
Moldova	No	No	No
Monaco	Yes	Yes	Yes
Mongolia	Yes	Yes	No
Montenegro	No	Yes	Yes
Netherlands	Yes	Yes	Yes
North Macedonia	No	Yes	No
Norway	No	Yes	Yes
Philippines	Yes	Yes	Yes
Poland	Yes	Yes	Yes
Portugal	Yes	Yes	Yes
Romania	No	No	No
Russia	Yes	Yes	Yes
San Marino	Yes	Yes	Yes
Serbia	Yes	Yes	Yes
Slovakia	Yes	No	Yes
Slovenia	Yes	Yes	Yes
Spain	Yes	Yes	Yes
Sweden	Yes	Yes	Yes
Switzerland	Yes	Yes	Yes
Taiwan	Yes	Yes	Yes
Tajikistan	No	Yes	Yes
Turkey	Yes	Yes	Yes
Turkmenistan	Yes	Yes	Yes
Ukraine	No	No	No
United Kingdom	No	Yes	No
United States	Unclear	No	No
Uzbekistan	Yes	Yes	Yes
Vatican City	Yes	Yes	Yes

=== Albania ===
According to the Criminal Code of Albania, defamation is a crime. Slandering in the knowledge of falsity is subject to fines of from 40000 ALL (c. $350) to one million ALL (c. $8350). If the slandering occurs in public or damages multiple people, the fine is 40,000 ALL to three million ALL (c. $25100). In addition, defamation of authorities, public officials or foreign representatives (Articles 227, 239 to 241) are separate crimes with maximum penalties varying from one to three years of imprisonment.

=== Argentina ===
In Argentina, the crimes of calumny and injury are foreseen in the chapter "Crimes Against Honor" (Articles 109 to 117-bis) of the Penal Code. Calumny is defined as "the false imputation to a determined person of a concrete crime that leads to a lawsuit" (Article 109). However, expressions referring to subjects of public interest or that are not assertive do not constitute calumny. Penalty is a fine from 3,000 to 30,000 pesos. He who intentionally dishonour or discredit a determined person is punished with a penalty from 1,500 to 20,000 pesos (Article 110).

He who publishes or reproduces, by any means, calumnies and injuries made by others, will be punished as responsible himself for the calumnies and injuries whenever its content is not correctly attributed to the corresponding source. Exceptions are expressions referring to subjects of public interest or that are not assertive (see Article 113). When calumny or injury are committed through the press, a possible extra penalty is the publication of the judicial decision at the expenses of the guilty (Article 114). He who passes to someone else information about a person that is included in a personal database and that one knows to be false, is punished with six months to three years in prison. When there is harm to somebody, penalties are aggravated by an extra half (Article 117 bis, §§ 2nd and 3rd).

=== Australia ===
Defamation law in Australia developed primarily out of the English law of defamation and its cases, though now there are differences introduced by statute and by the implied constitutional limitation on governmental powers to limit speech of a political nature established in Lange v Australian Broadcasting Corporation (1997).

In 2006, uniform defamation laws came into effect across Australia. In addition to fixing the problematic inconsistencies in law between individual States and Territories, the laws made a number of changes to the common law position, including:

- Abolishing the distinction between libel and slander.
- Providing new defences including that of triviality, where it is a defence to the publication of a defamatory matter if the defendant proves that the circumstances of publication were such that the plaintiff was unlikely to sustain any harm.
- The defences against defamation may be negated if there is proof the publication was actuated by malice.
- Greatly restricting the right of corporations to sue for defamation (see e.g. Defamation Act 2005 (Vic), s 9). Corporations may, however, still sue for the tort of injurious falsehood, where the burden of proof is greater than in defamation, because the plaintiff must show that the defamation was made with malice and resulted in economic loss.

The 2006 reforms also established across all Australian states the availability of truth as an unqualified defence; previously a number of states only allowed a defence of truth with the condition that a public interest or benefit existed. The defendant however still needs to prove that the defamatory imputations are substantially true.

The law as it currently stands in Australia was summarized in the 2015 case of Duffy v Google by Justice Blue in the Supreme Court of South Australia:

The tort can be divided up into the following ingredients:

- the defendant participates in publication to a third party of a body of work;
- the body of work contains a passage alleged to be defamatory;
- the passage conveys an imputation;
- the imputation is about the plaintiff;
- the imputation is damaging to the plaintiff's reputation.

Defences available to defamation defendants include absolute privilege, qualified privilege, justification (truth), honest opinion, publication of public documents, fair report of proceedings of public concern and triviality.

==== Online ====
On 10 December 2002, the High Court of Australia delivered judgment in the Internet defamation case of Dow Jones v Gutnick. The judgment established that internet-published foreign publications that defamed an Australian in their Australian reputation could be held accountable under Australian defamation law. The case gained worldwide attention and is often said, inaccurately, to be the first of its kind. A similar case that predates Dow Jones v Gutnick is Berezovsky v Michaels in England.

Australia's first Twitter defamation case to go to trial is believed to be Mickle v Farley. The defendant, former Orange High School student Andrew Farley was ordered to pay $105,000 to a teacher for writing defamatory remarks about her on the social media platform.

A more recent case in defamation law was Hockey v Fairfax Media Publications Pty Limited [2015], heard in the Federal Court of Australia. This judgment was significant as it demonstrated that tweets, consisting of even as little as three words, can be defamatory, as was held in this case.

=== Austria ===
In Austria, the crime of defamation is foreseen by Article 111 of the Criminal Code. Related criminal offences include "slander and assault" (Article 115), that happens "if a person insults, mocks, mistreats or threatens will ill-treatment another one in public", and yet "malicious falsehood" (Article 297), defined as a false accusation that exposes someone to the risk of prosecution.

=== Azerbaijan ===
In Azerbaijan, the crime of defamation (Article 147) may result in a fine up to "500 times the amount of minimum salaries", public work for up to 240 hours, correctional work for up to one year, or imprisonment of up to six months. Penalties are aggravated to up to three years of prison if the victim is falsely accused of having committed a crime "of grave or very grave nature" (Article 147.2). The crime of insult (Article 148) can lead to a fine of up to 1,000 times the minimum wage, or to the same penalties of defamation for public work, correctional work or imprisonment.

According to the OSCE report on defamation laws, "Azerbaijan intends to remove articles on defamation and insult from criminal legislation and preserve them in the Civil Code".

=== Belgium ===
In Belgium, crimes against honour are foreseen in Chapter V of the Belgian Penal Code, Articles 443 to 453-bis. Someone is guilty of calumny "when law admits proof of the alleged fact" and of defamation "when law does not admit this evidence" (Article 443). The penalty is eight days to one year of imprisonment, plus a fine (Article 444). In addition, the crime of "calumnious denunciation" (Article 445) is punished with 15 days to six months in prison, plus a fine. In any of the crimes covered by Chapter V of the Penal Code, the minimum penalty may be doubled (Article 453-bis) "when one of the motivations of the crime is hatred, contempt or hostility of a person due to his or her intended race, colour of the skin, ancestry, national origin or ethnicity, nationality, gender, sexual orientation, marital status, place of birth, age, patrimony, philosophical or religious belief, present or future health condition, disability, native language, political belief, physical or genetical characteristic, or social origin".

=== Brazil ===
In Brazil, defamation is a crime, which is prosecuted either as "defamation" (three months to a year in prison, plus fine; Article 139 of the Penal Code), "calumny" (six months to two years in prison, plus fine; Article 138 of the PC) or "injury" (one to six months in prison, or fine; Article 140), with aggravating penalties when the crime is practiced in public (Article 141, item III) or against a state employee because of his regular duties. Incitation to hatred and violence is also foreseen in the Penal Code (incitation to a crime, Article 286). Moreover, in situations like bullying or moral constraint, defamation acts are also covered by the crimes of "illegal constraint" (Article 146 of the Penal Code) and "arbitrary exercise of discretion" (Article 345 of PC), defined as breaking the law as a vigilante.

=== Bulgaria ===
In Bulgaria, defamation is formally a criminal offence, but the penalty of imprisonment was abolished in 1999. Articles 146 (insult), 147 (criminal defamation) and 148 (public insult) of the Criminal Code prescribe a penalty of fine.

=== Canada ===
==== Civil ====
===== Quebec =====
In Quebec, defamation was originally grounded in the law inherited from France and is presently established by Chapter III, Title 2 of Book One of the Civil Code of Quebec, which provides that "every person has a right to the respect of his reputation and privacy".

To establish civil liability for defamation, the plaintiff must establish, on a balance of probabilities, the existence of an injury (fault), a wrongful act (damage), and of a causal connection (link of causality) between the two. A person who has made defamatory remarks will not necessarily be civilly liable for them. The plaintiff must further demonstrate that the person who made the remarks committed a wrongful act. Defamation in Quebec is governed by a reasonableness standard, as opposed to strict liability; a defendant who made a false statement would not be held liable if it was reasonable to believe the statement was true.

==== Criminal ====
The Criminal Code of Canada specifies the following as criminal offences:

- Defamatory libel, defined as "matter published, without lawful justification or excuse, that is likely to injure the reputation of any person by exposing him to hatred, contempt or ridicule, or that is designed to insult the person of or concerning whom it is published", receives the same penalty.
- A "libel known to be false" is an indictable offence, for which the prison term is a maximum of five years.

The criminal portion of the law has been rarely applied, but it has been observed that, when treated as an indictable offence, it often appears to arise from statements made against an agent of the Crown, such as a police officer, a corrections officer, or a Crown attorney. In the most recent case, in 2012, an Ottawa restaurant owner was convicted of ongoing online harassment of a customer who had complained about the quality of food and service in her restaurant.

According to the OSCE official report on defamation laws issued in 2005, 57 persons in Canada were accused of defamation, libel and insult, among which 23 were convicted—9 to prison sentences, 19 to probation and one to a fine. The average period in prison was 270 days, and the maximum sentence was four years of imprisonment.

==== Online ====
The rise of the internet as a medium for publication and the expression of ideas, including the emergence of social media platforms transcending national boundaries, has proven challenging to reconcile with traditional notions of defamation law. Questions of jurisdiction and conflicting limitation periods in trans-border online defamation cases, liability for hyperlinks to defamatory content, filing lawsuits against anonymous parties, and the liability of internet service providers and intermediaries make online defamation a uniquely complicated area of law.

In 2011, the Supreme Court of Canada held that a person who posts hyperlinks on a website which lead to another site with defamatory content is not publishing that defamatory material for the purposes of libel and defamation law.

=== Chile ===
In Chile, the crimes of calumny and slanderous allegation (injurias) are covered by Articles 412 to 431 of the Penal Code. Calumny is defined as "the false imputation of a determined crime and that can lead to a public prosecution" (Article 412). If the calumny is written and with publicity, penalty is "lower imprisonment" in its medium degree plus a fine of 11 to 20 "vital wages" when it refers to a crime, or "lower imprisonment" in its minimum degree plus a fine of six to ten "vital wages" when it refers to a misdemeanor (Article 413). If it is not written or with publicity, penalty is "lower imprisonment" in its minimum degree plus a fine of six to fifteen "vital wages" when it is about a crime, or plus a fine of six to ten "vital wages" when it is about a misdemeanor (Article 414).

According to Article 25 of the Penal Code, "lower imprisonment" is defined as a prison term between 61 days and five years. According to Article 30, the penalty of "lower imprisonment" in its medium or minimum degrees carries with it also the suspension of the exercise of a public position during the prison term.

Article 416 defines injuria as "all expression said or action performed that dishonors, discredits or causes contempt". Article 417 defines broadly injurias graves (grave slander), including the imputation of a crime or misdemeanor that cannot lead to public prosecution, and the imputation of a vice or lack of morality, which are capable of harming considerably the reputation, credit or interests of the offended person. "Grave slander" in written form or with publicity are punished with "lower imprisonment" in its minimum to medium degrees plus a fine of eleven to twenty "vital wages". Calumny or slander of a deceased person (Article 424) can be prosecuted by the spouse, children, grandchildren, parents, grandparents, siblings and heirs of the offended person. Finally, according to Article 425, in the case of calumnies and slander published in foreign newspapers, are considered liable all those who from Chilean territory sent articles or gave orders for publication abroad, or contributed to the introduction of such newspapers in Chile with the intention of propagating the calumny and slander.

=== China ===
==== Civil ====
Based on text from Wikisource: Civil Code of the People's Republic of China, "Book Four" ("Personality Rights").

"Chapter I" ("General rules"):

- Personality rights: reputation, honour, privacy, dignity (Art. 990)
- Protection of personality rights (Arts. 991–993)
- Personality rights of the deceased (Art. 994)
- Liability for infringement; and requests to stop, restore reputation, offer apology (Arts. 995–1000)

"Chapter V" ("Rights to Reputation and Rights to Honor"):

- Right to reputation, protection from defamation and insults (Art. 1024)
  - Reputation includes moral character, prestige, talent, credit
- Liability for fact fabrication, distortion, lack of verification, misrepresentation, insults (Art. 1025)
- Verification considerations, source credibility, controversial information, timeliness, public order and morals (Art. 1026)
- Depictions of real people and events, in literary and artistic works (Art. 1027)
- Right to request correction or deletion (Art. 1028)
- Right to request correction or deletion, for incorrect credit reports (Arts. 1029, 1030)
- Honorary titles and awards: protection, recording, correction (Art. 1031)

==== Criminal ====
Article 246 of the Criminal Law of the People's Republic of China (中华人民共和国刑法) makes serious defamation punishable by fixed-term imprisonment of not more than three years or criminal detention upon complaint, unless it is against the government.

=== Croatia ===
In Croatia, the crime of insult prescribes a penalty of up to three months in prison, or a fine of "up to 100 daily incomes" (Criminal Code, Article 199). If the crime is committed in public, penalties are aggravated to up to six months of imprisonment, or a fine of "up to 150 daily incomes" (Article 199–2). Moreover, the crime of defamation occurs when someone affirms or disseminates false facts about other person that can damage his reputation. The maximum penalty is one year in prison, or a fine of up to 150 daily incomes (Article 200–1). If the crime is committed in public, the prison term can reach one year (Article 200–2). On the other hand, according to Article 203, there is an exemption for the application of the aforementioned articles (insult and defamation) when the specific context is that of a scientific work, literary work, work of art, public information conducted by a politician or a government official, journalistic work, or the defence of a right or the protection of justifiable interests, in all cases provided that the conduct was not aimed at damaging someone's reputation.

=== Czech Republic ===
According to the Czech Criminal Code, Article 184, defamation is a crime. Penalties may reach a maximum prison term of one year (Article 184–1) or, if the crime is committed through the press, film, radio, TV, publicly accessible computer network, or by "similarly effective" methods, the offender may stay in prison for up to two years or be prohibited of exercising a specific activity. However, only the most severe cases will be subject to criminal prosecution. The less severe cases can be solved by an action for apology, damages or injunctions.

=== Denmark ===
In Denmark, libel is a crime, as defined by Article 267 of the Danish Criminal Code, with a penalty of up to six months in prison or a fine, with proceedings initiated by the victim. In addition, Article 266-b prescribes a maximum prison term of two years in the case of public defamation aimed at a group of persons because of their race, colour, national or ethnic origin, religion or "sexual inclination".

=== Finland ===
In Finland, defamation is a crime, according to the Criminal Code (Chapter 24, Sections 9 and 10), punishable with a fine, or, if aggravated, with up to two years' imprisonment or a fine. Defamation is defined as spreading a false report or insinuation apt to cause harm to a person, or otherwise disparaging someone. Defamation of the deceased may also constitute an offence if apt to cause harm to surviving loved ones. In addition, there is a crime called "dissemination of information violating personal privacy" (Chapter 24, Section 8), which consists in disseminating information, even accurate, in a way that is apt to harm someone's right to privacy. Information that may be relevant with regard to a person's conduct in public office, in business, or in a comparable position, or of information otherwise relevant to a matter of public interest, is not covered by this prohibition. Finnish criminal law has no provisions penalizing the defamation of corporate entities, only of natural persons.

=== France ===
==== Civil ====
While defamation law in most jurisdictions centres on the protection of individuals' dignity or reputation, defamation law in France is particularly rooted in protecting the privacy of individuals. While the broader scope of the rights protected make defamation cases easier to prove in France than, for example, in England; awards in defamation cases are significantly lower and it is common for courts to award symbolic damages as low as €1. Controversially, damages in defamation cases brought by public officials are higher than those brought by ordinary citizens, which has a chilling effect on criticism of public policy While the only statutory defence available under French defamation law is to demonstrate the truth of the defamatory statement in question, a defence that is unavailable in cases involving an individual's personal life; French courts have recognized three additional exceptions:

- References to matters over ten years old
- References to a person's pardoned or expunged criminal record
- A plea of good faith, which may be made if the statement
  - pursues a legitimate aim
  - is not driven by animosity or malice
  - is prudent and measured in presentation
  - is backed by a serious investigation that dutifully sought to ascertain the truth of the statement.

==== Criminal ====
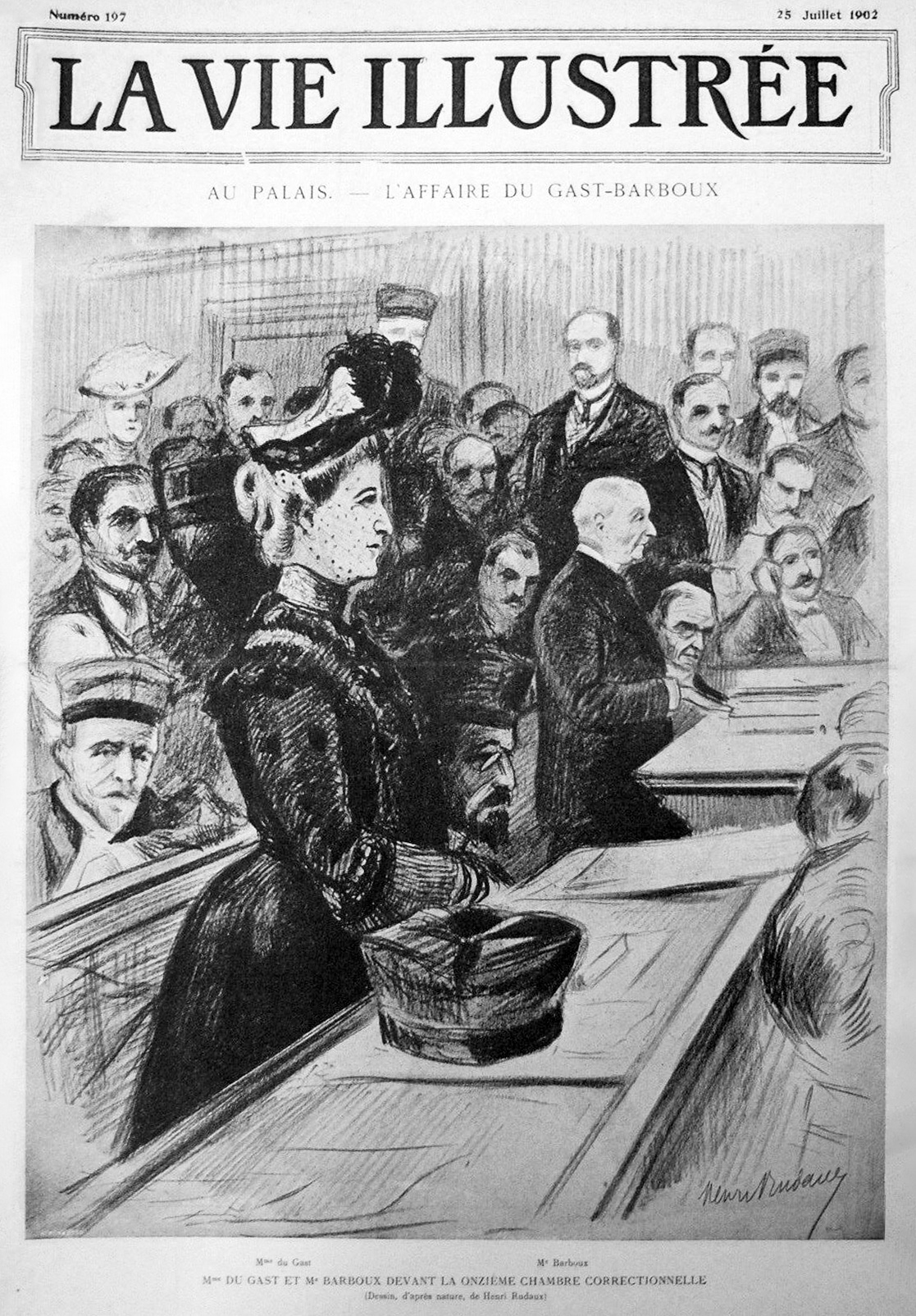
Front page of La Vie Illustrée on 25 July 1902. Mme Camille du Gast stands in court during the cases of character defamation by the barrister Maître Barboux, and the Prince of Sagan's assault on Barboux.

Defined as "the allegation or [the] allocation of a fact that damages the honor or reputation of the person or body to which the fact is imputed". A defamatory allegation is considered an insult if it does not include any facts or if the claimed facts cannot be verified.

=== Germany ===
In German law, there is no distinction between libel and slander. As of 2006, German defamation lawsuits are increasing. The relevant offences of Germany's Criminal Code are §90 (denigration of the Federal President), §90a (denigration of the [federal] State and its symbols), §90b (unconstitutional denigration of the organs of the Constitution), §185 ("insult"), §186 (defamation of character), §187 (defamation with deliberate untruths), §188 (political defamation with increased penalties for offending against paras 186 and 187), §189 (denigration of a deceased person), §192 ("insult" with true statements). Other sections relevant to prosecution of these offences are §190 (criminal conviction as proof of truth), §193 (no defamation in the pursuit of rightful interests), §194 (application for a criminal prosecution under these paragraphs), §199 (mutual insult allowed to be left unpunished), and §200 (method of proclamation).

=== Greece ===
In Greece, the maximum prison term for defamation, libel or insult was five years, while the maximum fine was €15,000.

The crime of insult (Article 361, § 1, of the Penal Code) may have led to up to one year of imprisonment or a fine, while unprovoked insult (Article 361-A, § 1) was punished with at least three months in prison. In addition, defamation may have resulted in up to two months in prison or a fine, while aggravated defamation could have led to at least three months of prison, plus a possible fine (Article 363) and deprivation of the offender's civil rights. Finally, disparaging the memory of a deceased person is punished with imprisonment of up to six months (Penal Code, Article 365).

=== India ===
In India, a defamation case can be filed under either criminal law or civil law, or both.

According to the Constitution of India, the fundamental right to free speech (Article 19) is subject to "reasonable restrictions":

19. Protection of certain rights regarding freedom of speech, etc.

- (1) All citizens shall have the right—
  - (a) to freedom of speech and expression;
- [(2) Nothing in sub-clause (a) of clause (1) shall affect the operation of any existing law, or prevent the State from making any law, in so far as such law imposes reasonable restrictions on the exercise of the right conferred by the said sub-clause in the interests of [the sovereignty and integrity of India], the security of the State, friendly relations with foreign States, public order, decency or morality, or in relation to contempt of court, defamation or incitement to an offence.]

Accordingly, for the purpose of criminal defamation, "reasonable restrictions" are defined in Section 499 of the Indian Penal Code, 1860 (Section 499 of Indian Penal Code has now been replaced by Section 356 of Bharatiya Nyaya Sanhita). This section defines defamation and provides ten valid exceptions when a statement is not considered to be defamation. It says that defamation takes place, when someone "by words either spoken or intended to be read, or by signs or by visible representations, makes or publishes any imputation concerning any person intending to harm, or knowing or having reason to believe that such imputation will harm, the reputation of such person". The punishment is simple imprisonment for up to two years, or a fine, or both (Section 500).

Some other offences related to false allegations: false statements regarding elections (Section 171G), false information (Section 182), false claims in court (Section 209), false criminal charges (Section 211).

Some other offences related to insults: against public servants in judicial proceedings (Section 228), against religion or religious beliefs (Section 295A), against religious feelings (Section 298), against breach of peace (Section 504), against modesty of women (Section 509).

According to the Indian Code of Criminal Procedure, 1973 defamation is prosecuted only upon a complaint (within six months from the act) (Section 199), and is a bailable, non-cognisable and compoundable offence (See: The First Schedule, Classification of Offences).

=== Ireland ===
According to the (revised) Defamation Act 2009, the last criminal offences (Sections 36‍–‍37, blasphemy) seem to have been repealed. The statute of limitations is one year from the time of first publication (may be extended to two years by the courts) (Section 38).

The 2009 Act repeals the Defamation Act 1961, which had, together with the underlying principles of the common law of tort, governed Irish defamation law for almost half a century. The 2009 Act represents significant changes in Irish law, as many believe that it previously attached insufficient importance to the media's freedom of expression and weighed too heavily in support of the individual's right to a good name.

=== Israel ===
According to Defamation Prohibition Law (1965), defamation can constitute either civil or criminal offence.

As a civil offence, defamation is considered a tort case and the court may award a compensation of up to NIS 50,000 to the person targeted by the defamation, while the plaintiff does not have to prove a material damage.

As a criminal offence, defamation is punishable by a year of imprisonment. In order to constitute a felony, defamation must be intentional and target at least two persons.

=== Italy ===
In Italy, there used to be different crimes against honour. The crime of injury (Article 594 of the Penal Code) referred to the act of offending someone's honour in their presence and was punishable with up to six months in prison or a fine of up to €516. The crime of defamation (Article 595, Penal Code) refers to any other situation involving offending one's reputation before many persons, and is punishable with a penalty of up to a year in prison or up to €1,032 in fine, doubled to up to two years in prison or a fine of €2,065 if the offence consists in the attribution of a determined fact. When the offence happens by the means of the press or by any other means of publicity, or in a public demonstration, the penalty is of imprisonment from six months to three years, or a fine of at least €516. Both of them were a querela di parte crimes, that is, the victim had the right of choosing, in any moment, to stop the criminal prosecution by withdrawing the querela (a formal complaint), or even prosecute the fact only with a civil action with no querela and therefore no criminal prosecution at all. Beginning from 15 January 2016, injury is no longer a crime but a tort, while defamation is still considered a crime like before.

Article 31 of the Penal Code establishes that crimes committed with abuse of power or with abuse of a profession or art, or with the violation of a duty inherent to that profession or art, lead to the additional penalty of a temporary ban in the exercise of that profession or art. Therefore, journalists convicted of libel may be banned from exercising their profession. Deliberately false accusations of defamation, as with any other crime, lead to the crime of calunnia ("calumny", Article 368, Penal Code), which, under the Italian legal system, is defined as the crime of falsely accusing, before the authorities, a person of a crime they did not commit. As to the trial, judgment on the legality of the evidence fades into its relevance.

=== Japan ===
The Constitution of Japan reads:

Article 21. Freedom of assembly and association as well as speech, press and all other forms of expression are guaranteed. No censorship shall be maintained, nor shall the secrecy of any means of communication be violated.

==== Civil ====
Under article 723 of the Japanese Civil Code, a court is empowered to order a tortfeasor in a defamation case to "take suitable measures for the restoration of the [plaintiff's] reputation either in lieu of or together with compensation for damages". An example of a civil defamation case in Japan can be found at Japan civil court finds against ZNTIR President Yositoki (Mitsuo) Hataya and Yoshiaki.

==== Criminal ====
The Penal Code of Japan (translation from government, but still not official text) seems to prescribe these related offences:

Article 92, "Damage to a Foreign National Flag". Seems relevant to the extent that the wording: "... defiles the national flag or other national emblem of a foreign state for the purpose of insulting the foreign state", can be construed to include more abstract defiling; translations of the Japanese term (汚損, oson) include 'defacing'.

Article 172, "False Accusations". That is, false criminal charges (as in complaint, indictment, or information).

Article 188, "Desecrating Places of Worship; Interference with Religious Service". The Japanese term (不敬, fukei) seems to include any act of 'disrespect' and 'blasphemy'—a standard term; as long as it is performed in a place of worship.

Articles 230 and 230-2, "Defamation" (名誉毀損, meiyokison). General defamation provision. Where the truth of the allegations is not a factor in determining guilt; but there is "Special Provision for Matters Concerning Public Interest", whereby proving the allegations is allowed as a defence. See also 232: "prosecuted only upon complaint".

Article 231, "Insults" (侮辱, bujoku). General insult provision. See also 232: "prosecuted only upon complaint".

Article 233, "Damage to Credibility; Obstruction of Business". Special provision for damaging the reputation of, or 'confidence' (信用, shinnyou) in, the business of another.

For a sample penal defamation case, see President of the Yukan Wakayama Jiji v. States, Vol. 23 No. 7 Minshu 1966 (A) 2472, 975 (Supreme Court of Japan 25 June 1969)—also on Wikisource. The defence alleged, among other things, violation of Article 21 of the Constitution. The court found that none of the defence's grounds for appeal amounted to lawful grounds for a final appeal. Nevertheless, the court examined the case ex officio, and found procedural illegalities in the lower courts' judgments (regarding the exclusion of evidence from testimony, as hearsay). As a result, the court quashed the conviction on appeal, and remanded the case to a lower court for further proceedings.

=== Malaysia ===
In Malaysia, defamation is both a tort and a criminal offence meant to protect the reputation and good name of a person. The principal statutes relied upon are the Defamation Act 1957 (Revised 1983) and the Penal Code. Following the practice of other common law jurisdictions like the United Kingdom, Singapore, and India, Malaysia relies on case law. In fact, the Defamation Act 1957 is similar to the English Defamation Act 1952. The Malaysian Penal Code is pari materia with the Indian and Singaporean Penal Codes.

=== Mexico ===
In Mexico, crimes of calumny, defamation and slanderous allegation (injurias) have been abolished in the Federal Penal Code as well as in fifteen states. These crimes remain in the penal codes of seventeen states, where penalty is, in average, from 1.1 years (for ones convicted for slanderous allegation) to 3.8 years in jail (for those convicted for calumny).

=== Netherlands ===
In the Netherlands, defamation is mostly dealt with by lodging a civil complaint at the District Court. Article 167 of book 6 of the Civil Code holds: "When someone is liable towards another person under this Section because of an incorrect or, by its incompleteness, misleading publication of information of factual nature, the court may, upon a right of action (legal claim) of this other person, order the tortfeasor to publish a correction in a way to be set by court." If the court grants an injunction, the defendant is usually ordered to delete the publication or to publish a rectification statement.

=== Norway ===
In Norway, defamation was a crime punished with imprisonment of up to six months or a fine (Penal Code, Chapter 23, § 246). When the offence is likely to harm one's "good name" and reputation, or exposes him to hatred, contempt or loss of confidence, the maximum prison term went up to one year, and if the defamation happens in print, in broadcasting or through an especially aggravating circumstance, imprisonment may have reached two years (§ 247). When the offender acts "against his better judgment", he was liable to a maximum prison term of three years (§ 248). According to § 251, defamation lawsuits must be initiated by the offended person, unless the defamatory act was directed to an indefinite group or a large number of persons, when it may also have been prosecuted by public authorities.

Under the new Penal Code, decided upon by the Parliament in 2005, defamation would cease to exist as a crime. Rather, any person who believes he or she has been subject to defamation will have to press civil lawsuits. The Criminal Code took effect on 1 October 2015.

=== Philippines ===
==== Criminal ====
According to the Revised Penal Code of the Philippines ("Title Thirteen", "Crimes Against Honor"):

ARTICLE 353. Definition of Libel. – A libel is a public and malicious imputation of a crime, or of a vice or defect, real or imaginary, or any act, omission, condition, status, or circumstance tending to cause the dishonor, discredit, or contempt of a natural or juridical person, or to blacken the memory of one who is dead.

- Malice presumed, even if true; exceptions: private communications in the course of duty, fair reports—without comments—on official proceedings (Art. 354)
- Punishment for libel in writing or similar medium (including radio, painting, theatre, cinema): imprisonment, fine, civil action (Art. 355)
- Threat to publish libel concerning one's family, for extracting money (Art. 356)
- Publication in the press of private-life facts—connected to official proceedings—offending virtue, honour, reputation (Art. 357)
- Slander – oral defamation (Art. 358)
- Slander by deed – "any act not included and punished in this title, which shall cast dishonour, discredit or contempt upon another person" (Art. 359)
- Responsibility for dissemination; same as for authorship (Art. 360)
- Conditions for defence of truth: good motives, justifiable ends; not available for allegations of non-criminal activities—unless related to official duties of government employees (Art. 361)
- Malicious comments cancel the exceptions of Art. 354 (Art. 362)
- Incriminating an innocent person (Art. 363)
- Intrigue against honour or reputation (Art. 364)

Related articles:

- Aggravating circumstances (Art. 14)
  - Crime committed in contempt of, or with insult to, public authorities (¶ 2)
  - Act committed with insult or disrespect, regarding rank, age, or sex (¶ 3)
  - Intentionally causing ignominy, in addition to other effects of the act (¶ 17)
- Statute of limitations: Two years for libel, six months for slander, two months for light offences (Art. 90)
- Offending religious feelings—in places of worship, or during religious ceremonies (Art. 133)
- Disrespectful behaviour towards legislature or related bodies, during their proceedings (Art. 144)
- "Unlawful use of means of publication" (Art. 154)
  - Publication of malicious fake news, endangering public order, or damaging state interests or credit (¶ 1)
- False testimony against defendant, in criminal cases (Art. 180)
- Spreading false rumours, when aiming to monopolize or restrain trade (Art. 186 ¶ 2)
- Lesser physical injury, when intended to insult, offend, cause ignominy (Art. 265 ¶ 2)
- Threats to harm honour—e.g. for extracting money (Art. 282)

In January 2012, The Manila Times published an article on a criminal defamation case. A broadcaster was jailed for more than two years, following conviction on libel charges, by the Regional Trial Court of Davao. The radio broadcast dramatized a newspaper report regarding former speaker Prospero Nograles, who subsequently filed a complaint. Questioned were the conviction's compatibility with freedom of expression, and the trial in absentia. The United Nations Human Rights Committee recalled its General comment No. 34, and ordered the Philippine government to provide remedy, including compensation for time served in prison, and to prevent similar violations in the future.

==== Online ====
In 2012, the Philippines enacted Republic Act 10175, titled Cybercrime Prevention Act of 2012. Essentially, this Act provides that libel is criminally punishable and describes it as: "Libel – the unlawful or prohibited act as defined in Article 355 of the Revised Penal Code, as amended, committed through a computer system or any other similar means which may be devised in the future." Professor Harry Roque of the University of the Philippines has written that under this law, electronic libel is punished with imprisonment from six years and one day to up to twelve years. As of 30 September 2012, five petitions claiming the law to be unconstitutional had been filed with the Philippine Supreme Court, one by Senator Teofisto Guingona III. The petitions all claim that the law infringes on freedom of expression, due process, equal protection and privacy of communication.

=== Poland ===
In Poland, defamation is a crime that consists of accusing someone of a conduct that may degrade him in public opinion or expose him "to the loss of confidence necessary for a given position, occupation or type of activity". Penalties include fine, limitation of liberty and imprisonment for up to a year (Article 212.1 of the Criminal Code). The penalty is more severe when the offence happens through the media (Article 212.2). When the insult is public and aims at offending a group of people or an individual because of his or their nationality, ethnicity, race, religion or lack of religion, the maximum prison term is three years.

=== Portugal ===
In Portugal, defamation crimes are: "defamation" (article 180 of the Penal Code; up to six months in prison, or a fine of up to 240 days), "injuries" (art. 181; up to three months in prison, or a fine up to 120 days), and "offence to the memory of a deceased person" (art. 185; up to 6 months in prison or a fine of up 240 days). Penalties are aggravated in cases with publicity (art. 183; up to two years in prison or at least 120 days of fine) and when the victim is an authority (art.184; all other penalties aggravated by an extra half). There is yet the extra penalty of "public knowledge of the court decision" (costs paid by the defamer) (art. 189 of Penal Code) and also the crime of "incitement of a crime" (article 297; up to three years in prison, or fine).

=== Romania ===
Since 2014, defamation is no longer criminalized in the country.

=== Saudi Arabia ===
In Saudi Arabia, defamation of the state, or a past or present ruler, is punishable under terrorism legislation. In a 2015 case, a Saudi writer was arrested for defaming a former ruler of the country. Reportedly, under a [2014] counterterrorism law, "actions that 'threaten Saudi Arabia's unity, disturb public order, or defame the reputation of the state or the king' are considered acts of terrorism. The law decrees that a suspect can be held incommunicado for 90 days without the presence of their lawyer during the initial questioning."

=== Singapore ===
In Singapore, Division 2 of Part 3 of the Protection from Harassment Act 2014 provides for individuals who have been affected by false statements online to seek a variety of court orders under the tort of harassment that are not available under the pre-internet tort of defamation:

- Stop Publication Order (an order requiring the tortfeasor to stop making the defamatory statement)
- Correction Order (an order for the tortfeasor to publish a correction of the statement)
- Disabling Order (an order requiring an internet-based intermediaries to disable access to the defamatory statement).

This is distinct from and does not affect plaintiffs right of action under the common law torts of libel and slander as modified by the Defamation Act 1957. The Protection of Harassment Act 2014, which provides for criminal penalties in addition to civil remedies, is specifically designed to address a narrower scope of conduct in order to avoid outlawing an overly broad range of speech, and is confined to addressing speech that causes "harassment, alarm, or distress".

=== South Korea ===
In South Korea, both true and false statements can be considered defamation. The penalties increase for false statements. It is also possible for a person to be criminally defamed when they are no longer alive.

Criminal defamation occurs when a public statement damages the subject's reputation, unless the statement was true and presented solely for the public interest. In addition to criminal law, which allows for imprisonment (up to seven years in case the allegations are false) and monetary fines, one can also sue for damages with civil actions. Generally, criminal actions proceed civil ones with South Korean police as judicial investigators.

==== Online ====
In October 2008, the Korea JoongAng Daily published an article on online attacks against celebrities, and their potential connection to suicides in the country. Before the death of Choi Jin-sil, there were rumours online of a significant loan to the actor Ahn Jae-hwan, who killed himself earlier due to debts. U;Nee hanged herself, unable to deal with remarks about her physical appearance and surgery. Jeong Da-bin committed suicide while suffering from depression, later linked to personal attacks about her appearance. Na Hoon-a was falsely rumoured to have been castrated by the yakuza. Byun Jung-soo was falsely reported to have died in a car accident. A professor of information and social studies from the Soongsil University, warned how rumours around celebrities can impact their lives, in unexpected and serious ways.

In January 2009, according to an article in The Korea Times, a Seoul court approved the arrest of online financial commentator Minerva, for spreading false information. According to the decision, Minerva's online comments affected national credibility negatively. Lawmakers from the ruling Grand National Party proposed a bill, that would allow imprisonment up to three years for online defamation, and would authorize the police to investigate cyber defamation cases without prior complaint.

In September 2015, according to an article in Hankook Ilbo, submitted complaints for insults during online games were increasing. Complainants aimed for settlement money, wasting the investigative capacity of police departments. One person could end up suing 50 others, or more. This led to the emergence of settlement-money hunters, provoking others to insult them, and then demanding compensation. According to statistics from the Cyber Security Bureau of the National Police Agency, the number of cyber defamation and insult reports was 5,712 in 2010, 8,880 in 2014, and at least 8,488 in 2015. More than half of the complaints for cyber insults were game-related (the article mentions League of Legends specifically). Most of the accused were teenagers. Parents often paid settlement fees, ranging from 300,000 to 2,000,000 South Korean won (US$300–2000 as of 2015), to save their children from getting criminal records.

=== Former Soviet Union ===
In the former Soviet Union, defamatory insults can "only constitute a criminal offence, not a civil wrong".

=== Spain ===
In Spain, the crime of calumny (Article 205 of the Penal Code) consists of accusing someone of a crime knowing the falsity of the accusation, or with a reckless contempt for truth. Penalties for cases with publicity are imprisonment from six months to two years or a fine of 12 to 24 months, and for other cases only a fine of six to twelve months' fine (Article 206). Additionally, the crime of injury (Article 208 of the Penal Code) consists of hurting someone's dignity, depreciating his reputation or injuring his self-esteem, and is only applicable if the offence, by its nature, effects and circumstances, is considered by the general public as strong. Injury has a penalty of fine from three to seven months, or from six to fourteen months when it is strong and with publicity. According to Article 216, an additional penalty to calumny or injury may be imposed by the judge, determining the publication of the judicial decision (in a newspaper) at the expenses of the defamer.

=== Sweden ===
In Sweden, denigration (ärekränkning) is criminalized by Chapter 5 of the Criminal Code. Article 1 regulates defamation (förtal) and consists of pointing out someone as a criminal or as "having a reprehensible way of living", or of providing information about them "intended to cause exposure to the disrespect of others". The penalty is a fine. It is generally not a requirement that the statements are untrue; it is enough if they statements are meant to be vilifying.

Article 2 regulates gross defamation (grovt förtal) and has a penalty of up to two years in prison or a fine. In judging if the crime is gross, the court should consider whether the information, because of its content or the scope of its dissemination, is calculated to produce "serious damage". For example, if it can be established that the defendant knowingly conveyed untruths. Article 4 makes it a crime to defame a deceased person according to Article 1 or 2. Most obviously, the paragraph is meant to make it illegal to defame someone's parents as a way to bypass the law.

Article 3 regulates other insulting behaviour (förolämpning), not characterized under Article 1 or 2, and is punishable with a fine or, if it is gross, with up to six months of prison or a fine. While an act of defamation involves a third person, it is not a requirement for insulting behaviour.

Under exemptions in the Freedom of the Press Act, Chapter 7, both criminal and civil lawsuits may be brought to court under the laws on denigration.

=== Switzerland ===
In Switzerland, the crime of wilful defamation is punished with a maximum term of three years in prison, or with a fine of at least thirty days' worth, according to Article 174-2 of the Swiss Criminal Code. There is wilful defamation when the offender knows the falsity of his/her allegations and intentionally looks to ruin the reputation of one's victim (see Articles 174-1 and 174–2).

On the other hand, defamation is punished only with a maximum monetary penalty of 180 daily penalty units (Article 173–1). When it comes to a deceased or absent person, the statute of limitations is 30 years (after the death).

=== Taiwan ===
==== Civil ====
According to the Civil Code of the Republic of China.

"Part I General Principles", "Chapter II Persons", "Section I Natural Persons":

- Personality (and name) infringement; prevention, removal, damages for emotional distress (Arts. 18, 19)

"Part II Obligations", "Chapter I General Provisions"

"Section 1 – Sources of Obligations", "Sub-section 5 Torts":

- General: Compensation for damaging the rights of another (Art. 184)
- Damage to reputation, credit, privacy, chastity, personality (Art. 195)
  - Compensation even if loss is not purely pecuniary
  - Measures to restore reputation
- Statute of limitations: Two years after injury and tortfeasor known, otherwise ten years from the act (Art. 197)

"Section 3 – Effects Of Obligations", "Sub-section 1 Performance":

- Injury to personality of creditor, by debtor's non-performance; compensation (Art. 227-1)

==== Criminal ====
The Criminal Code of the Republic of China (中華民國刑法), under "Chapter 27 Offenses Against Reputation and Credit", lists these articles:

- Insults (Art. 309)
- Slander and libel as distinct offences, with harsher punishment for libel; truth as a defence—except for private matters (Art. 310)
- Defences related to protection of legal interests, reports on public matters, and fair comments (Art. 311)
- Insult and defamation of the deceased (Art. 312)
- Damage to credibility, with increased penalties when done via the media or the Internet (Art. 313)
- Offences only prosecuted upon complaint (Art. 314)

Other related articles:

- Increased punishment for injuring the reputation of heads and representatives of friendly states (Art. 116)
- Insults against foreign states, by dishonouring flags or emblems (Art. 118)
- Insults against public officials (Art. 140)
- Insults against public officials, combined with physical damage to proclamations (Art. 141)
- Insult against the state, by dishonouring the flag, emblem, or portraits of its founder (Art. 160)
- Insulting religious or memorial sites (Art. 246)
- Insulting the remains of deceased persons (Art. 247)
- Insulting the remains of deceased persons, in combination with gravedigging (Art. 249)
- Threat to injure the reputation of another, if it endangered their safety (Art. 305)

In July 2000, the Justices of the Judicial Yuan (司法院大法官) – the Constitutional Court of Taiwan—delivered the J.Y. Interpretation No. 509 ("The Defamation Case"). They upheld the constitutionality of Art. 310 of the Criminal Code. In the Constitution, Article 11 establishes freedom of speech. Article 23 allows restrictions to freedoms and rights, to prevent infringing on the freedoms and rights of others. The court found that Art. 310 ¶¶ 1-2 were necessary and proportional to protect reputation, privacy, and the public interest. It seemed to extend the defence of truth in ¶ 3, to providing evidence that a perpetrator had reasonable grounds in believing the allegations were true (even if they could not ultimately be proven). Regarding criminal punishments versus civil remedies, it noted that if the law allowed anyone to avoid a penalty for defamation by offering monetary compensation, it would be tantamount to issuing them a licence to defame.

In January 2022, an editorial in the Taipei Times (written by a law student from the National Chengchi University) argued against Articles 309 and 310. Its position was abolishing prison sentences in practice, on the way to full decriminalization. It argued that insulting language should be tackled via education, and not in the courts (with the exception of hate speech). According to the article, 180 prosecutors urged the Legislative Yuan to decriminalize defamation, or at least limit it to private prosecutions (in order to reserve public resources for major crimes, rather than private disputes and quarrels irrelevant to the public interest).

In June 2023, the Constitutional Court delivered its judgment Case on the Criminalization of Defamation II. The court dismissed all the complaints and upheld the constitutionality of the disputed provisions. It emphasized that excluding the application of substantial truth doctrine on defamatory speeches concerning private matters with no public concern, is proportionate in protecting the victim's reputation and privacy. The court reaffirmed J.Y. Interpretation No. 509 and further supplemented its decision. It elaborated on the offender's duty to check the validity of the defamatory statements regarding public matters, and dictated that the offender shall not be punished if there are objective and reasonable grounds for the offender to believe the defamatory statement is true. The court ruled that untrue defamatory statements concerning public matters shall not be punished unless they are issued under actual malice. This includes situations where the offender knowingly or under gross negligence issued said defamatory statement. In terms of the burden of proof for actual malice, the court ruled that it shall be on the prosecutor or the accuser. To prevent fake news from eroding the marketplace of ideas, the court pointed out that the media (including mass media, social media, and self-media) shall be more thorough than the general public in fact-checking.

=== Thailand ===
==== Civil ====
The Civil and Commercial Code of Thailand provides that:

A person who, contrary to the truth, asserts or circulates as a fact that which injurious to the reputation or the credit of another or his earnings or prosperity in any other manner, shall compensate the other for any damage arising therefrom, even if he does not know of its untruth, provided he ought to know it.

A person who makes a communication the untruth of which is unknown to him, does not thereby render himself liable to make compensation, if he or the receiver of the communication has a rightful interest in it.

The Court, when given judgment as to the liability for wrongful act and the amount of compensation, shall not be bound by the provisions of the criminal law concerning liability to punishment or by the conviction or non-conviction of the wrongdoer for a criminal offence.

In practice, defamation law in Thailand has been found by the Office of the United Nations High Commissioner for Human Rights to be facilitate hostile and vexatious litigation by business interests seeking to suppress criticism.

==== Criminal ====
The Thai Criminal Code provides that:

Section 326. Defamation

Whoever, imputes anything to the other person before a third person in a manner likely to impair the reputation of such other person or to expose such other person to be hated or scorned, is said to commit defamation, and shall be punished with imprisonment not exceeding one year or fined not exceeding twenty thousand Baht, or both.

Section 327. Defamation to the Family

Whoever, imputing anything the deceased person before the third person, and that imputation to be likely to impair the reputation of the father, mother, spouse or child of the deceased or to expose that person hated or scammed to be said to commit defamation, and shall be punished as prescribed by Section 326.

Criminal defamation charges in Thailand under Section 326 of the Criminal Code are frequently used to censor journalists and activists critical of human rights circumstances for workers in the country.

=== United Kingdom ===
The United Kingdom abolished criminal libel on 12 January 2010 by section 73 of the Coroners and Justice Act 2009. There were only a few instances of the criminal libel law being applied. Notably, the Italian anarchist Errico Malatesta was convicted of criminal libel for denouncing the Italian state agent Ennio Belelli in 1912.

Under English common law, proving the truth of the allegation was originally a valid defence only in civil libel cases. Criminal libel was construed as an offence against the public at large based on the tendency of the libel to provoke breach of peace, rather than being a crime based upon the actual defamation per se; its veracity was therefore considered irrelevant. Section 6 of the Libel Act 1843 allowed the proven truth of the allegation to be used as a valid defence in criminal libel cases, but only if the defendant also demonstrated that publication was for the "public benefit".

=== United States ===
==== Criminal ====
Fewer than half of U.S. states have criminal defamation laws, but the applicability of those laws is limited by the First Amendment to the U.S. Constitution, and the laws are rarely enforced. There are no criminal defamation or insult laws at the federal level. On the state level, 23 states and two territories have criminal defamation laws on the books: Alabama, Florida, Idaho, Illinois, Kansas, Kentucky, Louisiana, Massachusetts, Michigan, Minnesota, Mississippi, Montana, Nevada, New Hampshire, New Mexico, North Carolina, North Dakota, Oklahoma, South Carolina, Texas, Utah, Virginia, Wisconsin, Puerto Rico and Virgin Islands. In addition, Iowa criminalizes defamation through case law without statutorily defining it as a crime.

Noonan v. Staples is sometimes cited as precedent that truth is not always a defence to libel in the U.S., but the case is actually not valid precedent on that issue because Staples did not argue First Amendment protection, which is one theory for truth as complete defence, for its statements. The court assumed in this case that the Massachusetts law was constitutional under the First Amendment without it being argued by the parties.

==== Online ====
In response to the expansion of other jurisdictions' attempts to enforce judgements in cases of trans-border defamation and to a rise in domestic strategic lawsuits against public participation (SLAPPs) following the rise of the internet, the federal and many state governments have adopted statutes limiting the enforceability of offshore defamation judgments and expediting the dismissal of defamation claims. American writers and publishers are shielded from the enforcement of offshore libel judgments not compliant under the SPEECH Act, which was passed by the 111th United States Congress and signed into law by President Barack Obama in 2010. It is based on the New York State 2008 Libel Terrorism Protection Act (also known as "Rachel's Law", after Rachel Ehrenfeld who initiated the state and federal laws). Both the New York state law and the federal law were passed unanimously.

=== Venezuela ===
In March 2016, a civil action for defamation led to imposition of a four-year prison sentence on a newspaper publisher.

=== Yemen ===
In 2024 Judge and member of the Supreme Judicial Council, Sabah al-Alwani was the subject of an online defamation campaign.

== UNESCO reports ==
=== 2014 ===
==== Global ====
As of 2012, defamation, slander, insult and lese-majesty laws, existed across the world. According to Article 19, 174 countries retained criminal penalties for defamation, with full decriminalization in 21 countries. The Organization for Security and Co-operation in Europe (OSCE) had an ongoing decriminalization campaign. UNESCO also provided technical assistance to governments on revising legislation, to align with international standards and best practices.

The use of civil defamation increased, often in lieu of criminal cases, resulting in disproportionate fines and damages, particularly against media and journalists critical of governments. Libel tourism enabled powerful individuals to limit critical and dissenting voices by shopping around the world for the jurisdictions most likely to approve their defamation suits.

As of 2011, 47% of countries had laws against blasphemy, apostasy or defamation of religion. According to the Pew Research Center, 32 had laws or policies prohibiting blasphemy, and 87 had defamation of religion laws.

The legal liability of internet intermediaries gained increasing importance. Private companies could be held responsible for user-generated content that was made accessible through their servers or services, if it was deemed illegal or harmful. Due to uncertain takedown procedures and the lack of legal resources, intermediaries sometimes were excessively compliant with takedown notices, often outside the legal system and with little recourse for the affected content producer. Intermediaries were at times held criminally liable for content posted by a user, when others perceived it violated privacy or defamation laws. Such cases indicated an emerging trend of preventive censorship, where companies conducted their own monitoring and filtering to avoid possible repercussions. This contributed to a process of privatized censorship, where some governments may rely on private-sector companies to regulate online content, outside of electoral accountability and without due process.

Debate around defamation of religions, and how this impacts the right to free expression, continued to be an issue at a global level. In 2006, UNESCO's executive board adopted a decision on "Respect for freedom of expression and respect for sacred beliefs and values and religious and cultural symbols". In 2011, the United Nations Human Rights Council made further calls for strengthening religious tolerance and preventing hate speech. Similar resolutions were made in 2012 and 2013. In 2013, 87 governments agreed on the Rabat Plan of Action, for the prohibition of incitement to hatred.

==== Africa ====
By 2013, at least 19% of the region had decriminalized defamation. In 2010, the African Commission on Human and Peoples' Rights adopted a resolution, calling on African Union (AU) member countries to repeal criminal defamation or insult laws. In 2012, the Pan-African Parliament passed a resolution encouraging AU heads of state to sign the Declaration of Table Mountain, calling for the abolition of insult and criminal defamation laws. Such laws frequently led to the arrest and imprisonment of journalists across the continent. It was signed by two countries. In most cases—criminal or civil—the burden of proof continued to be on the defendant, and it was rare to have public interest recognized as a defence. Members of government continued to initiate most such cases. There was a trend towards using civil defamation in lieu of criminal defamation, but with demands for extremely high damages and the potential to bankrupt media outlets—although the courts often dismissed such cases. According to an analysis by the Pew Research Center's Forum on Religion and Public Life, laws against defamation of religion remained on the books in 13 countries (27%), four countries had laws penalizing apostasy, and two had anti-blasphemy laws.

==== Arab region ====
All Arab States retained criminal penalties for defamation. Truth was rarely a defence to defamation and libel charges. In 2012, Algeria and Tunisia partially decriminalized defamation by eliminating prison terms. According to an analysis by the Pew Research Center's Forum on Religion and Public Life, sixteen countries (84%) had laws penalizing blasphemy, apostasy and/or defamation of religion. Lese-majesty laws existed in some parts of the region. There were vaguely worded concepts and terms, interpreted narrowly by the judiciary. The number of bloggers imprisoned was rising. Among some Gulf States in particular, citizen journalists and social media users reporting on political matters were arrested. The charges were defamation or insult, typically with respect to heads of state. There was a trend towards trying journalists and bloggers in military courts, particularly during and following the Arab Spring; although this was not limited to countries where such uprisings occurred.

==== Asia-Pacific ====
The majority of countries (86%) had laws imposing criminal penalties for defamation. Six countries decriminalized defamation. Both criminal and civil defamation charges against journalists and media organizations continued. Other legal trends included using charges of terrorism, blasphemy, inciting subversion of state power, acting against the state, and conducting activities to overthrow the state. In 2011, the Pew Research Center's Forum on Religion and Public Life found that anti-blasphemy laws existed in eight countries (18%), while 15 (34%) had laws against defamation of religion.

==== Central and Eastern Europe ====
Four countries in Central and Eastern Europe fully decriminalized defamation. An additional four abolished prison sentences for defamation convictions, although the offence remained in the criminal code.

At the same time, an emerging trend was using fines and sanctions. Civil defamation cases were increasingly used, as evidenced by the number of civil lawsuits and disproportionate fines against journalists and media critical of governments. In at least four countries, defamation laws were used by public officials, including heads of state, to restrict critical media across all platforms. Media and civil society increased pressure on authorities, to stop granting public officials a higher degree of protection against defamation in the media.

Blasphemy was not a widespread phenomenon in Central and Eastern Europe, where only one country still had such a provision. According to the Pew Research Center's Forum on Religion & Public Life, 17 countries had laws penalizing religious hate speech.

==== Latin America and the Caribbean ====
The Special Rapporteur for Freedom of Expression of the Inter-American Commission on Human Rights (IACHR) of the Organization of American States (OAS), recommended repealing or amending laws that criminalize desacato, defamation, slander, and libel. Some countries proposed reforming the IACHR, which could have weakened the office of the special rapporteur, but the proposal was not adopted by the OAS General Assembly.

Seven countries, three of which in the Caribbean, fully or partially decriminalized defamation. Another trend was abolishing desacato laws, which refer specifically to defamation of public officials. The OAS Special Rapporteur expressed concern over the use of terrorism or treason offences against those who criticize governments.

Defamation, copyright, and political issues were identified as the principal motives for content removal.

==== Western Europe and North America ====
Defamation was a criminal offence in the vast majority of countries, occasionally leading to imprisonment or elevated fines. Criminal penalties for defamation remained, but there was a trend towards their repeal. Between 2007 and 2012, 23 of the 27 countries in Western Europe and North America imposed criminal penalties for various exercises of expression (including criminal libel, defamation, slander, insult, and lese-majesty laws—but excluding incitement to violence).

Two countries decriminalized defamation in 2009, followed by another in 2010. In another case, there was no criminal libel at the federal level, and a minority of states still had criminal defamation laws. In general, criminal penalties for libel were imposed rarely, with two notable exceptions.

According to the Pew Research Center's Forum on Religion & Public Life, eight countries had blasphemy legislation, though these laws were used infrequently.

The range of defences available to those accused of invasion of privacy or defamation expanded, with growing recognition of the public-interest value of journalism. In at least 21 countries, defences to charges of defamation included truth and public interest. This included countries that had at least one truth or public interest defence to criminal or civil defamation (including countries where defence of truth was qualified or limited—for example, to statements of fact as opposed to opinions, or to libel as opposed to insult).

Civil defamation continued, particularly about content related to the rich and powerful, including public officials and celebrities. There were a high number of claims, prohibitive legal costs, and disproportionate damages. This prompted a campaign against what was seen by some as plaintiff-friendly libel laws in the United Kingdom; and that led to reforming the country's defamation law, resulting in the Defamation Act 2013.

Due to legal protection of speech, and practical and jurisdictional limits on effectiveness of controls, censorship was increasingly carried out by private bodies. Privatized censorship by internet intermediaries involved: (i) the widening range of content considered harmful and justified to block or filter; (ii) inadequate due process and judicial oversight of decisions to exclude content or to conduct surveillance; and (iii) a lack of transparency regarding blocking and filtering processes (including the relationship between the state and private bodies, in the setting of filters and the exchange of personal data).

=== 2018 ===
==== Global ====
As of 2017, at least 130 UNESCO member states retained criminal defamation laws. In 2017, the OSCE Representative on Freedom of the Media issued a report on criminal defamation and anti-blasphemy laws among its member states, which found that defamation was criminalized in nearly three-quarters (42) of the 57 OSCE participating states. Many of the laws pertaining to defamation included specific provisions with harsher punishments for speech or publications critical of heads of state, public officials, state bodies, and the state itself. The report noted that blasphemy and religious insult laws existed in around one third of OSCE participating states; many of these combined blasphemy and/or religious insult with elements of hate speech legislation. A number of countries continued to include harsh punishments for blasphemy and religious insult.

Countries in every region extended criminal defamation legislation to online content. Cybercrime and anti-terrorism laws passed throughout the world; bloggers appeared before courts, with some serving time in prison. Technological advancements strengthened governments' abilities to monitor online content.

==== Africa ====
Between 2012 and 2017, four AU member states decriminalized defamation. Other national courts defended criminal defamation's place in their constitutions. Regional courts pressured countries to decriminalize defamation. The ECOWAS Court of Justice, which had jurisdiction over cases pertaining to human rights violations since 2005, set a precedent with two rulings in favour of cases challenging the criminalization of defamation.

In the landmark case of Lohé Issa Konaté v. the Republic of Burkina Faso, the African Court on Human and Peoples' Rights overturned the conviction of a journalist, characterizing it as a violation of the African Charter on Human and Peoples' Rights, the International Covenant on Civil and Political Rights, and the treaty of the Economic Community of West African States (ECOWAS). The journalist was subjected to censorship, excessive fines, and a lengthy imprisonment for defamation. Following this legally binding decision, the country in question proceeded to amend its laws and pay the journalist compensation.

In 2016, the Constitutional Court of Zimbabwe declared its criminal defamation laws unconstitutional. In 2017, the High Court of Kenya declared Section 194 (criminal defamation) of the Penal Code unconstitutional.

Civil society and press freedom organizations lobbied for changes to the penal codes in their respective countries—sometimes successfully. However, even in countries where libel or defamation were explicitly decriminalized, there were often other laws whose broad provisions allowed governments to imprison journalists for a wide range of reasons (cybercrime, anti-terrorism, incitement to violence, national security).

The majority of countries had defamation laws, that were used to charge and imprison journalists. Media outlets were suspended after publishing reports critical of the government or other political elites.

==== Arab region ====
Libel, defamation, slander, as well as emergency laws and anti-terrorism laws, were frequently used as tools of government control on media. Emergency laws often superseded the general law. Defamation laws tended to favour those who could afford costly legal expenses.

Google transparency reports showed that several governments in the Arab region made requests to remove content (such as YouTube videos), based on allegations of insulting religion and defaming powerful figures.

Journalists were predominantly jailed under anti-state laws, with charges ranging from spreading chaos, promoting terrorism, and inciting dissidence, to incitement against the ruling government. Charges for publishing or spreading false news were the next most frequent. Other defamation or religious insult laws were laid against journalists in several cases.

==== Asia-Pacific ====
Most countries in South, Southeast, and East Asia, had civil and/or criminal defamation laws. Various cases indicated that such laws were used by political interests and powerful elites (individuals and corporations). Cases of online defamation were on the rise.

One recently enacted defamation law received condemnation, including from the United Nations. The law allowed journalists to be jailed if they were found questioning Sharia law or the affairs of the state. From 2014, criminal defamation laws were challenged, both in South and East Asian countries.

==== Central and Eastern Europe ====
Since 2014, use of criminal defamation and insult laws increased. New legal obligations were imposed on Internet service providers to monitor content, as a matter of national security—particularly in the Commonwealth of Independent States (CIS) sub-region.

Since 2012, more countries in the South-East Europe sub-region decriminalized defamation. Of the eight countries, three repealed all general provisions on criminal defamation and insult, four retained criminal defamation offences but without the possibility of imprisonment, and one retained imprisonment as a possibility. Defamation of public officials, state bodies, or state institutions was criminalized in one country. Other forms of criminal offences existed in some countries: insulting public officials, harming the reputation and honour of the head of state, insulting or defaming the state.

Civil laws to protect the reputation of individuals or their privacy were increasingly used. There was an increase in the number of cases where politicians turned to the courts, seeking relief for reputational injuries. Civil defamation lawsuits by politicians limited press freedom, in at least one country of the CIS sub-region.

==== Latin America and the Caribbean ====
There were attempts to pass legislation allowing content removal based on different claims, including defamation and hate speech. Draft bills were proposed, criminalizing online publication of content deemed as hate speech, and allowing the executive to order take downs of such content. Several states tried to pass legislation creating special criminal offences for online content that could damage the reputation and/or honour of a person. As of 2017, none of these bills were approved.

Public officials throughout the region initiated criminal proceedings against internet users, predominantly against those opposing the ruling party. Claims were based on defamation laws, including charges against memes parodying political personalities.

Antigua and Barbuda (in 2015), Jamaica (in 2013), and Grenada (in 2012), abolished criminal libel. Trinidad and Tobago partially repealed criminal libel in 2014. The Dominican Republic removed prison sentences for defamation of government bodies and public officials.

New cybercrime laws were passed in two Caribbean countries. In 2017, one country passed an anti-hate law that was criticized for stifling political debate.

==== Western Europe and North America ====
Legal developments varied across the region. While criminal defamation and insult laws were repealed in some countries, stronger defamation laws were produced or reintroduced in other countries.

In common law countries, criminal defamation laws mostly fell into disuse. In contrast, most civil law countries in Western Europe retained criminal defamation laws. In several Western European countries, defamation was sanctioned more harshly if it involved a public official. In some instances, heads of state were provided more protection to their reputation and punishments were more severe. Some governments strengthened criminal defamation laws to counter online hate speech or cyberbullying.

The European Court of Human Rights had limited influence in legal reforms according to the court's standards, where (suspended) prison sentences for defamation were considered a violation of Article 10 of the European Convention on Human Rights. Other high courts had a mixed record when evaluating criminal defamation and freedom of expression.

According to the 2017 OSCE report, criminal defamation laws were in place in at least 21 of the 27 countries in Western Europe and North America. At least 13 states retained statutes penalizing blasphemy or religious insult.

=== 2022 ===
==== Global ====
As of 2022, at least 160 countries had criminal defamation laws on the books, down from 166 in 2015. At least 57 laws and regulations across 44 countries were adopted or amended since 2016, containing vague language or disproportionate punishments, threatening online freedom of expression and press freedom.

According to reports provided by Meta, Google, and Twitter, the number of content removal requests received by those platforms from court orders, law enforcement, and executive branches of governments worldwide doubled in the last five years—to a total of approximately 117,000 requests in 2020. Of these companies, only Google published data on the rationale for content removal requests made by governments; that data showed "defamation" and "privacy and security" as the leading justifications.

== Defamation and religions ==
=== Christianity ===
Christian religious texts (such as the Epistle of James – full text on Wikisource), catechisms (like the one commissioned by the Council of Trent – see "The Eighth Commandment" from its Roman Catechism), and preachers (like Jean-Baptiste Massillon – see his sermon titled "On evil-speaking"), have argued against expressions (true and false) that can offend others.

Theologian and catechist Joseph Deharbe, in his interpretation of the Eighth Commandment, gives practical advice to the faithful: The commandment above all forbids giving false evidence in court. It is never lawful to tell a lie. In general, forbidden are lies, hypocrisy, detraction, calumny, slander, false suspicion, rash judgment; anything that can injure the honour or character of another. With two exceptions: for the good of the guilty, or when necessary to prevent a greater evil—and then, only with charitable intentions and without exaggerations.

The Catholic Encyclopedia has entries for two related concepts, detraction and slander.

Defamation and calumny seem to be used as synonyms for slander.

==== Detraction ====
The mortal sin of damaging another's good name, by revealing their faults or crimes (honestly believed real by the detractor). Contrasted with calumny, where the assertions are knowingly false.

The degree of sinfulness depends on the harm done, based on three things:

- The criminality of the thing alleged
- The reputation of the detractor's trustworthiness
- The dignity or esteem of the victim

A relatively small defect alleged against a person of eminent station (a bishop is given as example) might be a mortal sin. While an offence of considerable magnitude (drunkenness is given as example), attributed to a member of a social class in which such things frequently happen (a sailor is given as example), might constitute only a venial sin.

If the victim has been publicly sentenced, or their misdeeds are already notorious, it is lawful to refer to them—unless the accused have reformed, or their deeds have been forgotten. But this does not apply to particular communities (a college or monastery are given as examples), where it would be unlawful to publish the fact outside said community. But even if the sin is not public, it may be revealed for the common good, or for the benefit of the narrator, listener, or culprit.

The damage from failing to reveal another's sin must be balanced against the evil of defamation [sic]. No more than necessary should be exposed, and fraternal correction is preferable. Journalists are allowed to criticize public officials. Historians must be able to document the causes and connections of events, and strengthen public conscience.

Those who abet the principal's defamation, are also guilty. Detractors (or their heirs) must provide restitution. They must restore the victim's fame and pay them damages. According to the text, allegations cannot be taken back, reparation methods proposed by theologians are unsatisfactory, and the only way is finding the right occasion for a favourable characterization of the defamed.

==== Slander ====
Defined as attributing fault to another, when the slanderer knows they are innocent. It combines damaging another's reputation and lying.

According to the text, theologians say that the act of lying might not be grievous in itself, but advise mentioning it in confession to determine reparation methods. The important act is injuring a reputation (hence moralists do not consider slander distinct from detraction). The method of injury is negligible.

In a somewhat contradictory opinion, it is stated that there are circumstances where misdeeds can be lawfully exposed, but a lie is intrinsically evil and can never be justified.

Slander violates commutative justice, so the perpetrator must make restitution. Atonement seems achievable by retracting the false statement, which undoes the injury (even if this requires exposing the perpetrator as a liar). Compensation for the victim's losses may also be required.

=== Islam ===
In a 2018 academic paper, the author (a law student from the International Islamic University of Malaysia) argued for harmonization between Malaysian laws and Islamic legal principles. Article 3 of the Constitution declares Islam as the state religion. Article 10 provides for freedom of speech, with expressly permitted restrictions for defamation-related offences.

First, definitions of defamation from Malaysian and Islamic law are listed. According to the paper, definitions by Muslim scholars can include: mislead, accuse of adultery, and embarrass or discredit the dignity or honour of another. In the Quran, many more concepts might be included. The author concludes that Islamic definitions are better for classifying defamatory actions.

Second, freedom of speech is compared with teachings of Muhammad. Mentioned among others are: fragmentation of society, divine retribution by the angels in the afterlife, secrecy, loyalty, and treachery; dignity and honour are again mentioned. The author concludes that freedom of speech should be practised for the sake of justice, and can be lifted if it causes discomfort or unhealthy relationships in society.

Third, Malaysian laws related to defamation are enumerated. According to the author, there were cases with exorbitant monetary awards, interference by third parties, and selective actions against political opposition; having a negative impact on society.

Fourth, the proposal of harmonization is discussed. The author proposes amending Malaysian laws to conform with Islamic legal principles, under the supervision of a specific department. Mentioned are: Islamic customary law (Adat), secondary sources of Islamic law (such as Urf), and "other laws" practised by people in various countries; provided that they are in line with Islamic divine law (Maqasid). The author concludes that in the Malaysian context, this proposed harmonization would be justified by Article 3 of the Constitution (with a passing reference to the "supremacy of the Constitution", apparently guaranteed in Article 4).

Finally, the author enumerates proposed steps to bring about this legal reform. Defamation would include:

- Libel and slander
- Adultery (zina) and sodomy (liwat)
- Acts against honour and dignity that do not fall under the previous category

There would be three types of punishment for defamation:

- Criminal hadd punishments (which category seems to include corporal, capital, apostasy) – the author mentions 80 lashes
- Criminal tazir punishments (lashing, imprisonment, fine, "other")
- Monetary damages

Other proposed measures include: right of reply, order of retraction, mediation via an ombudsman, empowering the Human Rights Commission of Malaysia, finding ways for people to express their views and opinions, education.

=== Judaism ===
The Jewish Encyclopedia has two articles on the topic: calumny and slander.

The two terms seem to be conflated. It is not clear which, if any, corresponds to harmful and true speech, and which to harmful and false speech. Combined with Wikipedia's entry on lashon hara (terms are spelled somewhat differently), it might be deduced that:

- calumny, or leshon hara, is true speech that is negative or harmful
- slander, or (hotzaat) shem ra, is untrue speech

The Wikipedia article on lashon hara equates it to detraction. And classifies all of slander, defamation, and calumny, as the same—and equal to hotzaat shem ra.

==== Calumny ====
It is described as a sin, based on both the Bible ("gossip") and rabbinic literature (leshon hara, "the evil tongue"). Intentionally false accusations and also injurious gossip. Both forbidden in the Torah. Of the Ten Commandments, relevant is the ninth (in Judaism): Thou shalt not bear false witness against thy neighbour.

According to the article, the slanderous [sic] tongue ruins the slanderer, the listener, and the maligned. The divine presence will be denied to liars, hypocrites, scoffers, and slanderers. Slander is morally equated to idolatry, adultery, and murder.

According to the authors, some rabbis saw quinsy, leprosy (related to Miriam speaking ill of Moses), stoning, as deserved punishments. And the Midrash attributes hardships of various figures (such as Joseph, Moses, Elijah, Isaiah) to sins of the tongue.

As for legal remedies, the article refers to ethical and religious sanctions from the Bible and the Talmud, arguing that the law cannot repair subtle damage to reputation—with two exceptions. Bringing an evil name upon one's wife (punished with a fine and by disallowing divorce). Perjury, which would result in the perpetrator receiving same punishment, as the one their false testimony would have brought upon the falsely accused.

The authors conclude that calumny was met with righteous indignation and penal severity in Jewish thought, and this was in accordance with the ethical principle of treating the honour of others as one's own.

==== Slander ====
Defined as "false and malicious defamation" (circular definition) of another's reputation and character, disgracing them in their community. Here, it is distinguished from leshon hara by being deliberately false. Punishments include fines and damages.

According to the authors, the Law of Moses prescribed flagellation and monetary compensation for a husband who, without reasonable cause, questioned the virginity of his newly married wife; and divorce was disallowed (similarly with calumny). The article notes that after the destruction of the Temple in Jerusalem, these laws prescribing fines and capital punishment ceased.

Rabbinical enactments against slander are described as very stringent. Abusive language might have been exempt from any legal liability, unless it was considered slander (against both the living and the deceased). Fines and excommunication were a possibility. But fasting and apology also seemed to be acceptable atonements.

== See also ==
- Absence of Malice
- Abu Dhabi Secrets
- Blackstone's ratio
- Blind item
- Character assassination, smear campaign
- Chilling effect (law)
- Collateral censorship
- Cyberbullying, troll (slang)
- Cybercrime
- Defamation Act
- Disinformation
- False accusation
- Freedom of speech/expression
- Hate speech
- Insult (legal)
- Intentional tort
- Libel tourism
- Malicious prosecution
- Rumor
- Small penis rule
- Strategic lawsuit against public participation
