= Innocent dissemination =

A person who is found to have published a defamatory statement may evoke a defence of innocent dissemination, which absolves them of liability provided that they had no knowledge of the defamatory nature of the statement, and that their failure to detect the defamatory content was not due to negligence. The defence, sometimes also known as "mechanical distributor", is of concern to Internet service providers because of their potential liability for defamatory material posted by their subscribers.

== Background ==
The basic rule is that everyone involved in any way in the production or dissemination of defamatory material is liable as having published it. This is because defamation is a tort of strict liability. It can be committed unwittingly by reason of the existence of facts and circumstances unknown to the publisher of the defamatory statement. However, some forms of distribution or dissemination are so mechanical that a distributor ought not to be held liable unless he/she ought to have known there was defamation involved. Therefore, a defence of innocent dissemination is conceived.

== The defense ==
At common law, a defense of innocent dissemination is available to a person who, neither knowingly nor negligently, had merely a subordinate role in the dissemination of the matter containing the defamatory statement.

In Vizetelly v. Mudie's Select Library, a circulating library provided to subscribers a book on Stanley's search for Emir Pasha in Africa, which turned out to be defamatory. The issue was whether the library can claim protection under innocent dissemination. Lord Justice Romer described the defence as follows:

That [they were] innocent of any knowledge of the libel contained in the work disseminated by [them], that there was nothing in the work or the circumstances under which it came to [them] which ought to have led [them] to suppose that it contained a libel, and that, when the work was disseminated by [them], it was not by any negligence on [their] part that [they] did not know that it contained the libel, then, although the dissemination of the work by [them] was primâ facie publication of it, [they] may nevertheless, on proof of the before-mentioned facts, be held not to have published it.

Romer L.J., at 180, also noted that the defence places a heavy burden upon the defendant to show that they were not negligent. His Lordship held that the defendant library was liable for having negligently overlooked the publisher's request for return of the offending book.

Therefore, the defence involves three limbs:

1. the defendant did not know that the publication complained of contained a libel;
2. the defendant had no grounds to suppose that it was likely to contain defamatory matter; and
3. the absence of knowledge was not due to any negligence on the defendant's part.

However, it appears that a printer cannot evoke this defence. This has been criticized as "illogical" and has been explained as an exception that made sense in the days of primitive technology only – when printers used to read what they print, which is no longer the case.

S.1 (3) a of the Defamation Act 1996 now makes clear that a person will not be the author, editor or publisher if he is only involved in "printing, producing, distributing or selling printed materials containing the statement.

This corrected what was seen as a problem with the common law.

== Developments by jurisdiction ==
=== Canada ===
In Hemming v Newton, Hemming sued Newton for libel and defamation as a result of a posting and a story on a P2P website which was owned and moderated by Newton. The author of the posting was unknown, but Newton was the author of the story. Newton's statements of defence alleged he was an innocent disseminator as he did not see or authorize the posting before it occurred and removed it in good faith upon receipt of Hemming's complaint. Hemming asserted that it would be an abuse of process for Newton's defence of innocent dissemination to stand. The judge held that Newton had pleaded sufficient facts to enable Hemming to know why he contends he was an innocent disseminator, and refused to strike out the defence.

=== England and Wales ===
The defence of innocent dissemination has been extended to printers in England by virtue of s.1 of the Defamation Act 1996. However, the Act made clear that the defence is not available to the author, editor or commercial publisher of the defamatory material.

The potential liability of Internet Service Providers was explored in Godfrey v Demon Internet Service. The defendants were an ISP operating Usenet newsgroups. An unknown person made a posting in the United States in the newsgroup "soc.culture.thai". The posting followed a path from its originating American ISP to the defendants' news server in England. It purported to come from the plaintiff, but was an obscene and defamatory forgery. The plaintiff asked the defendants to remove the posting, but the defendant did not do so until the posting automatically expired 10 days later.

Morland J considered Byrne v Deane, in which the defendant failed to remove a defamatory notice placed on a board in its premise (a golf club). In Byrne, Greene LJ rejected the proposition that publication cannot be constituted by the refraining from doing some act, and identified the test as:

[H]aving regard to all the facts of the case is the proper inference that by not removing the defamatory matter the defendant really made himself responsible for its continued presence in the place where it had been put?

Morland J then held that whenever a defamatory posting is transmitted from the defendants' news server, the defendants should be regarded as having published that posting to customers who accessed the newsgroup containing that posting. Therefore he entered judgment for the plaintiff.

The issue was again considered in Bunt v Tilley & Ors, in which the plaintiff sought to establish his cause of action against the ISPs on the basis that the authors published the words complained of via the services provided by the ISPs. Eady J struck out the claim and propounded the test for publication as follows:

In determining responsibility for publication in the context of the law of defamation, it seems to me to be important to focus on what the person did, or failed to do, in the chain of communication. It is clear that the state of a defendant's knowledge can be an important factor. If a person knowingly permits another to communicate information which is defamatory, when there would be an opportunity to prevent the publication, there would seem to be no reason in principle why liability should not accrue. So too, if the true position were that the applicants had been (in the claimant's words) responsible for 'corporate sponsorship and approval of their illegal activities'.

I have little doubt, however, that to impose legal responsibility upon anyone under the common law for the publication of words it is essential to demonstrate a degree of awareness or at least an assumption of general responsibility, such as has long been recognized in the context of editorial responsibility...

Of course, to be liable for a defamatory publication it is not always necessary to be aware of the defamatory content, still less of its legal significance. Editors and publishers are often fixed with responsibility notwithstanding such lack of knowledge. On the other hand, for a person to be held responsible there must be knowing involvement in the process of publication of the relevant words. It is not enough that a person merely plays a passive instrumental role in the process...

Eady J went on to distinguish Godfrey as a case of continued publication of the same defamatory statements after receipt of the plaintiff's request of removal. Bunt was different because the claimant was relying on separate postings. His Lordship further remarked that the position of an ISP is not analogous to that of a distributor. While a distributor may need to prove an absence of negligence to establish a defence of innocent dissemination, his Lordship said persons who truly fulfil no more than the role of a passive medium for communication, such as ISPs, cannot be characterized as publishers and hence "do not need a defence".

=== Hong Kong ===
In Hong Kong, a statutory defence of unintentional defamation exists in section 25 of the Defamation Ordinance (Cap. 21), but differs from the statutory innocent dissemination defence in the UK Defamation Act 1996 in the sense that under the Defamation Ordinance a defence is not specified for a party who is involved in electronic publications. Under the Defamation Ordinance, if a defendant claims that the words in dispute were innocently published, it may make an "offer of amend", which is an offer to publish a correction of the offending words and a sufficient apology to the plaintiff. If the offer of amends is accepted by the plaintiff and is duly performed, the proceedings cannot be taken or continued against the person who made the offer, but can be possibly taken against the author. Section 25(5) of the Ordinance stipulates that the publication will be treated as innocent if (a) that the publisher did not intend to publish the words of and concerning that other person, and did not know of circumstances by virtue of which they might be understood to refer to him; or (b) that the words were not defamatory on the face of them, and the publisher exercised all reasonable care in relation to the publication. In either case, all "reasonable care" must be exercised by the publisher in relation to the publication.

The position of online service providers was considered in Hong Kong in Oriental Press Group Ltd and Another v Fevaworks Solutions Limited. The plaintiffs sought interlocutory injunction against the defendants, to restrain them from publishing certain allegedly defamatory statements on the Internet against the plaintiffs. The defendants were the operators of Golden Forum but had little control over what messages appear on the forum as messages were instantaneously and automatically uploaded. However, there were administrators who were empowered to remove defamatory messages. The plaintiffs alleged that a user posted a defamatory message that accused the plaintiffs of murdering a certain Sister Ha. After considering both Godfrey and Bunt, Yam J dismissed the contention that Godfrey was authority that all ISPs are publishers of all statements in their websites. His Lordship held that ISPs are only publishers when they become aware of the defamatory content of any posting and choose not to remove it from their server. As such, the Court refused to grant interlocutory injunction against the defendants.

=== United States ===
In the US there is a similar defence available under section 581 of the Second Restatement of Torts (1977), and after 1996, under the Digital Millennium Copyright Act.

In Cubby, Inc. v. CompuServe Inc., CompuServe's CIS product is an electronic, for-profit library that carries a vast number of publications (including one called "Rumorville") and collects usage and membership fees from its subscribers in return for access to the publications. Once it does decide to carry a publication, it will have little or no editorial control over that publication's contents. This is especially so when CompuServe carries the publication as part of a forum that is managed by a company unrelated to CompuServe.

With respect to the Rumorville publication – (an issue in the Cubby case) – a company uploads the text of Rumorville into CompuServe's data banks and makes it available to approved CIS subscribers instantaneously. It was held that CompuServe had no more editorial control over such a publication than does a public library, book store, or newsstand, and it was not feasible for CompuServe to examine every publication it carries for potentially defamatory statements. The judge also remarked that the inconsistent application of a lower standard of liability to an electronic news distributor than that applied to a public library, book store, or newsstand would impose an undue burden on the free flow of information. The judge also identified the appropriate standard of liability is whether CompuServe knew or had reason to know of the allegedly defamatory Rumorville statements.

The decision of the court in the Cubby case was coded into law with the 1996 Digital Millennium Copyright Act and Section 230 of the Communications Decency Act. Under the DMCA, an internet provider is immune from copyright violations committed by its user, as long as they promptly remove the violation once discovered. Under Section 230, a website is not liable for defamation committed by a user.
