= Verbal injury =

Verbal injury is a delict in Scotland.

Proof of special damage

In any action for verbal injury it is not necessary for the pursuer to aver or prove special damage if the words on which the action is founded are calculated to cause pecuniary damage to the pursuer.

== See also ==
- Malicious falsehood
