= Detraction =

Sin in Christianity

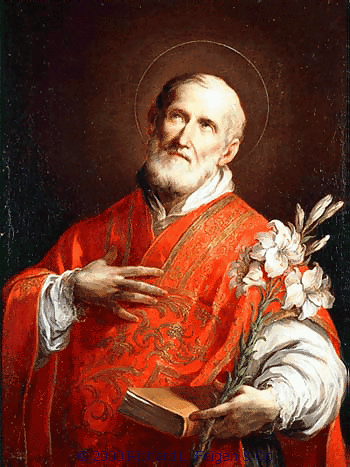
St. Philip Neri compared detraction to scattering feathers in the wind

In Christian theology, detraction is the sin of revealing another person's real faults to a third person without a valid reason, thereby lessening the reputation of that person.

== Distinction from calumny ==
Detraction differs from the sin of calumny and the civil wrong of defamation, which generally involve false accusations rather than unflattering truths.

The Catholic Encyclopedia clarifies:

Detraction is the unjust damaging of another's good name by the revelation of some fault or crime of which that other is really guilty or at any rate is seriously believed to be guilty by the defamer.

An important difference between detraction and calumny is at once apparent. The calumniator says what he knows to be false, whilst the detractor narrates what he at least honestly thinks is true.

== Gravity ==
According to J. Delaney of Catholic Encyclopedia, "Detraction in a general sense is a mortal sin, as being a violation of the virtue not only of charity but also of justice. It is obvious, however, that the subject-matter of the accusation may be so inconspicuous or, everything considered, so little capable of doing serious hurt that the guilt is not assumed to be more than venial. The same judgment is to be given when, as not unfrequently happens, there has been little or no advertence to the harm that is being done."

As in the case of stealing, detraction is a sin which demands restitution, even though rebuilding a victim's reputation may be nearly impossible. A commonly cited parable in this regard concerns a priest, often said to be Philip Neri, who gave a woman who had confessed to spreading gossip the penance of retrieving feathers that had been scattered on the wind—a task as impossible as undoing the damage she had done.

== Controversies involving detraction ==
Some have thought Catholics need to guard better against the sin of detraction than they are currently. In 2011, Seán Patrick O'Malley was accused of risking possible detraction when he published a list of names of accused abusers among the clergy before their canonical cases were completed. Pope Francis accused other Catholics of detraction when they criticized his appointment of Juan Barros Madrid.

On the other side of this issue, the counting of detraction as a sin has been criticized as "a kind of spiritual blackmail" when used to silence victims of abuse. The Roman Catholic Diocese of Lincoln specifically cited detraction among other reasons why it would not participate in the study leading to the John Jay Report. Concern about the sin of detraction was singled out as a contributing problem in the Murphy Report, which concluded:

Many of the failures to report appalling behaviour by clergy may well be attributable to a wish to avoid committing the sin of detraction.
