= Tort law in China =

Chinese law

The first tort law in the People's Republic of China was enacted in 2009.

== History ==
Civil and criminal law was not clearly delineated in Ancient Chinese law as they are in modern legal systems. Therefore, while Tort Law was not a distinct area of law, concepts familiar to tort law were present in the criminal laws. However, by the late feudalism period, personal injury or property damage torts were mostly focused on compensations.

=== Zhou dynasty ===
The earliest "tort case" known from Ancient China is from the Zhou dynasty. During a famine one person robbed another's barn by sending his slave to steal the grain. He was sued and the court ordered double the original grain restored to the victim to compensate the damages.

=== Qin dynasty ===
The Qin Code made some changes to tort liabilities introducing the concept of subjective fault (fault liability). In a case where one person borrows farm equipment, compensation would be required for damage to the equipment if the damage is caused by the condition of the equipment when it was borrowed.

In addition to fault liability, some defenses were developed. A person would not be liable if public property were damaged by fire or other natural forces outside the person's control. There was no liability for killing livestock, if the livestock was about to hurt someone.

=== Tang dynasty ===
Some scholars have advanced the position that the Yong Hui Code was more developed than the Corpus Iuris Civilis in some areas concerning torts. Proponents of this view argue that it was the first legal system to emphasize causation as an element for tortious acts and to distinguish negligence from intentional torts. Its said to have been the leading tort law in world from the time of the Tang Dynasty until the establishment of the Napoleonic Code.

=== Qing Dynasty ===
The Qing Code included 4 categories and 15 specific rules covering compensation for property damage, bodily injuries and various defenses against liability.

=== Early Modern Period: Imperialism and Integration ===
When Western imperial powers entered China after the First Opium War, the Chinese legal system was strained to nearly a breaking point. At this point, China abandoned its legal traditions of thousands of years and began the process of integration with European legal systems.

== Modern history ==
The Civil Code of the Republic of China is considered the first civil law of Chinese history is heavily based on the laws of the Qing dynasty and streamlined provisions from earlier draft laws. These laws were all abolished when the Chinese Communist Party established the People's Republic of China in 1949.

There was very little Tort Law legislation between 1949 and 1978. During the first decades of Communist Party rule they did not enact new Tort Law legislation, but instead compiled some civil law textbooks based on legal theories borrowed from the Soviet Union. In 1978 the government began some economic and legal reforms that included tort law legislation. The "General Principles of Civil Law" passed by the People's Congress in 1986 had four parts concerning Torts:

1. Imputation principles such as fault liability, no fault liability and equitable liability
2. Form of tortious acts, and compensation including intellectual property rights, personal rights and property rights
3. Special torts and liability involving high-risk liability, environmental pollution liability, product liability, and so on
4. Defenses like contributory negligence and necessity
