= Fraternal correction =

Fraternal correction (correctio fraterna) is a Christian social practice in which a private individual confronts a peer directly, ordinarily privately, about a perceived offence or wrongdoing. This is opposed to an official discipline meted by a superior to a subordinate.

Fraternal correction is mentioned in Mt 18,15–18.

In Roman Catholic ethics, fraternal correction is an expression of charity, since the corrector seeks to prevent the corrected from committing further sin. There are conditions for its application. The one corrected should be in a serious distress and there must be a reasonable hope that the corrected will be able to understand the correction and implement it. Cardinal Raymond Leo Burke argued in 2018 that it was incumbent upon cardinals to apply fraternal correction, all necessary conditions for its application being fulfilled, even to a pope.

== History ==
Theological Interpretation of Fraternal Correction

The first recorded writings on the concept of fraternal correction were authored by Augustine around 400 CE in The Rule of Saint Augustine. Ideas on fraternal correction from this writing originally were detailed to the scope of how a man is responsible for keeping their peers who set their gaze on a woman in a lustful manner accountable. Augustine details how the intent of fraternal correction is so that a sinner's problems do not get more severe, as pointing out a brother's sin is meant to get them to turn from a sinful behavior.

Thomas Aquinas further developed the idea of fraternal correction and how it should be enacted in Summa Theologica, ending in 1247 CE, specifically under Question 33. Fraternal correction, according to Aquinas, serves mainly as an act of charity. The intentions of someone giving fraternal correction are important, as fraternal correction is only deemed by Aquinas to be a holy act if it is out of worry for a sinner, and it should be done humbly and respectfully. He therefore claims fraternal correction should not be practiced with the intentions of being degrading or hateful to the sinner.

William of Ockham, in the 1320s and 30s, continued logical discourse on fraternal correction in the idea of legitimate correction versus illegitimate correction. The legitimacy of correction of sin was dependent on the person who was correcting someone else having correct information. There are several criteria that correction, therefore must fulfill in order to be legitimate. First, the person correcting someone else must know the truth in their information about the corrected's actions. Secondly, it must be plainly presented to the corrected that their actions are truly wrongdoing in the eyes of God, as it undermines the purpose of correction if someone is being corrected for an action that is not wrong in the word of God.

Fraternal Correction in Canon Law

Canon 1341 states that an ordinary may attempt to handle someone's wrongdoing with methods including fraternal correction before they attempt to seek justice by other means.

== Controversy Relating to Fraternal Correction ==
Emerging in 2002 and continuing to get larger throughout the 2000s and 2010s, sexual abuse by clergy members, and the cover ups of these cases, throughout the Catholic Church became an issue that was discovered to have spanned a much longer time ago, dating as far back as 50 years before. Because fraternal correction is supposed to be done in private, many pointed to it as ineffective and leading to cover ups. Carolyn Warner, for instance, believes that the system of fraternal correction allows priests and bishops to keep abuse a secret instead of bringing it to the proper authorities. Others such as Nicholas Cafardi contend that the custom of fraternal correction in Can. 1341 was not the problem, as when a sin presents scandal for a community then it is supposed to be brought to light. Another study claimed that secrecy in fraternal correction creates a culture where in the church priests are viewed as othered or apart from society at large, leading to priests and bishops remaining silent.

== See also ==
- Dubia
