= Declaration of Table Mountain =

The Declaration of Table Mountain is a statement on press freedom in Africa. The statement was issued by the World Association of Newspapers and News Publishers (WAN-IFRA) and World Editors Forum (WEF) at the 60th meeting of the World Newspaper Conference and 14th World Editors Forum Conference in Cape Town, South Africa, 3–6 June 2007. It is named after Table Mountain, at the southern tip of the African continent.

In country after country, the African press is crippled by a panoply of repressive measures, from the jailing and persecution of journalists to the widespread scourge of 'insult laws' and criminal defamation. As the start of an intensive campaign to improve this appalling situation, the World Association of Newspapers and News Publishers (WAN-IFRA) adopted the Declaration of Table Mountain on 3 June 2007 in Cape Town, South Africa, during its annual meeting.

Through this Declaration, WAN-IFRA has stated its conviction that Africa urgently needs a strong, free and independent press to act as a watchdog over public institutions, a crucial role that the press is hindered from and punished for playing by the widespread resort to 'insult laws' and criminal defamation, in particular.

Major African and international non-governmental organisations that, day after day, defend and promote freedom of expression and freedom of the press have now endorsed the Declaration and expressed their readiness to contribute to this campaign. Together, with determination, we will now aggressively press our case in the hope for a better future for African media freedom.
