= Ennio Belelli =

Italian anarchist and police informant (1860–1926)

- Born: 9 May 1860 (Note: 9 May is the date given by Giampietro Berti in his biographical entry in the Dizionario biografico degli anarchici italiani. Di Paola (2013, p. 151) instead gives 15 May.); Novellara, Kingdom of Sardinia
- Died: 2 April 1926 (aged 65); Reggio Emilia, Italy
- Occupations: Anarchist activist, police informant
- Known for: Infiltrating the European anarchist movement under the pseudonym Virgilio

Ennio Belelli (9 May 1860 – 2 April 1926) was an Italian anarchist who operated as an informant for the Italian government within the European anarchist movement under the pseudonym Virgilio.

== Biography ==
=== Early political activities ===
Little is known about Belelli's early intellectual development, but around 1886 he moved to Bologna, where he found employment in the office of the socialist lawyer Giuseppe Barbanti Brodano. In 1891, he moved to Reggio Emilia, where he became editor of the socialist newspaper L'Orizzonte. The periodical ceased publication after only a few months because of repeated seizures by the authorities, an event that also brought his professional relationship with Barbanti Brodano to an end.

Meanwhile, Belelli had become involved in the anarchist movement, eventually emerging as one of its leading activists in the Bologna area. Without steady employment, he partly supported himself through assistance from his fellow activists and contributed to various socialist, progressive and anarchist newspapers, including L'Amico del popolo and Bononia Ridet.

In 1892, when numerous anarchists in Bologna were arrested following two bomb attacks against the city's telegraph office and a bank, Belelli was not implicated in the ensuing judicial proceedings. He was, however, repeatedly charged with press-related offences. On 17 September 1897, he was sentenced to two years' imprisonment and a fine for defaming a Jewish lawyer through the Bologna newspaper Il Pubblico, which had an antisemitic editorial orientation.

Arrested on 20 November, he remained in prison until 20 March 1898, when he received a royal pardon thanks to the intervention of Senator Cesare Zanolini. He was imprisoned again on 13 May of the same year for his involvement in the bread riots of 1898. On 14 June, a Bologna court granted him provisional release on bail, but because he lacked the money required to pay it, he was unable to leave prison until towards the end of that year.

=== Recruitment and departure abroad ===
During the second half of the 1890s, Belelli probably began collaborating with the Italian police, with Vincenzo Neri, who had served as Bologna's police commissioner (questore) since April 1896, acting as his principal contact. The prevailing hypothesis concerning the beginning of this collaboration is that Neri intervened to secure Belelli's release from prison in 1898 in exchange for his services, although the precise circumstances of his recruitment have not been conclusively established by historians.

At the end of August 1900, Belelli left Bologna for Paris, where he frequented Italian anarchist circles and collaborated with Enrico Insabato, another informant working for the Italian authorities, who used the codename Dante. Together, they gathered information on anarchists living in the French capital and their international connections, particularly the relationship between Errico Malatesta and Italian anarchists residing in France.

In the spring of 1901, the two informants began conducting systematic surveillance, particularly of the activists Felice Vezzani, Silvio Corio and Sébastien Faure. During this period, the informant network operating in France reported principally to Police Commissioner Neri and Riccardo Secchi, a police official attached to the Italian consulate in Marseille.

In a report dated February 1901 and signed by both men, Belelli and Insabato expressed their devotion to Italy and to the officials to whom they transmitted information. Using the pseudonym Virgilio, Belelli also suggested possible measures that the authorities could adopt to intensify divisions within the anarchist movement. Nevertheless, the activities of Belelli and Insabato, including their attempts to foment discord among anarchists, failed to produce the desired results.

An Italian embassy report from this period indicates that Belelli was living in Paris with his family in an apartment with an annual rent of 600 francs, apparently without practising any profession. In September 1901, he was expelled from France on the occasion of a visit by Tsar Nicholas II of Russia. He subsequently moved to Geneva, Switzerland, and then to London, where he arrived in November 1901.

=== Activities as an informant in London ===
In London, Belelli became involved in the Italian anarchist community, establishing contacts with numerous activists and particularly with Malatesta, who became one of the principal targets of his surveillance activities. He continued transmitting information to the Italian Ministry of the Interior through a network of communications centred on Police Commissioner Vincenzo Neri and Giovanni Giolitti.

During this period, his identity as an informant remained secret, to the extent that both the Italian embassy and consulate in London continued to monitor him, believing him to be a genuine anarchist militant.

His activities enabled Belelli to establish a position within London's Italian anarchist community, allowing him to gather considerable information about the activities and relationships of militants residing in various European countries and the Americas. His reports to the authorities contained details of anarchists' movements, personal contacts, publications and alleged revolutionary intentions. Belelli paid particular attention to Malatesta's network of correspondents and to the relationships between the London exiles and anarchist circles in France, Switzerland, Spain, the United States and Latin America.

The information supplied by Belelli also helped keep Giolitti informed about disputes within London's anarchist community, including those concerning the informant Gennaro Rubino and accusations against Inspector Giuseppe Prina, who had compromised another informant known by the pseudonym Calvo.

Despite his role as an informant, Belelli participated in several public initiatives organised by London's Italian community. In June 1902, together with Antonio Galassini and Ascanio Santos, he served on the organising committee of the Italian People's University of London (Università Popolare Italiana di Londra), which was established with the participation of numerous associations within the Italian community. Based in Hatton Garden, the institution aimed to promote cultural education and provide learning opportunities for workers.

In February 1905, Belelli also participated in the International People's University (Università Popolare Internazionale), founded in the British capital by anarchists of various nationalities. The institution organised courses in languages, history, mathematics, science and other subjects, and maintained a library and facilities for cultural activities.

Belelli taught history there, while Silvio Corio gave drawing lessons and Malatesta taught physics and chemistry. The initiative was inaugurated on 25 February 1905 but ceased operating as early as July because of financial difficulties and internal disagreements.

Over the following years, Belelli continued to frequent anarchist circles while passing information to the Italian authorities. The reports written by Virgilio were distinguished by their concise and straightforward style and by the fact that, unlike several other informants, he did not persistently demand money from his contacts.

An examination of Belelli's correspondence, however, suggests that the information he supplied was generally of little significance. His reports reflected the concerns of the Italian authorities, who were primarily interested in preventing possible attacks against the monarchy and the government. Much of Belelli's reporting concerned minor aspects of anarchists' private lives and personal relationships rather than their actual political organisation.

=== Suspicions and conflict with Malatesta ===
Suspicions concerning Belelli arose several years before he was definitively identified as an informant. Luigi Fabbri recalled that Malatesta had already warned him about Belelli in 1906, while acknowledging that he lacked sufficient evidence to prove that Belelli was collaborating with the police.

In 1911, Belelli approached Fabbri in Bologna, claiming that Malatesta had asked him to investigate the conditions under which the anarchist might return to Italy. Fabbri regarded this claim as false but refrained from confronting Belelli about it. The two agreed to meet again, but Belelli failed to appear and shortly afterwards returned to London.

Further suspicions arose from an incident involving a sum of 45 lire sent by the anarchist Siegfried Nacht to Giovanni Spizzuoco to settle a debt. Nacht, who had received an offer of employment at the International Institute of Agriculture in Rome on condition that he sever his relations with anarchists, was subsequently questioned by the Italian authorities about this financial transaction.

The incident prompted him to ask the London anarchists to investigate the source of the information leak. Spizzuoco stated that Belelli was the only other person who knew about the money transfer, since he had personally exchanged the lire for pounds sterling. These suspicions were reinforced by a report from Paris alleging that Belelli regularly received registered letters from the Italian Ministry of the Interior.

During this period, Belelli also attempted to compromise Malatesta in the eyes of the British authorities through investigations connected with the Houndsditch murders and the activities of the Bonnot Gang. In 1912, he went so far as to publicly accuse Malatesta of having participated in the Houndsditch robbery.

In April 1912, following the publication of a special one-off issue entitled La Guerra Tripolina, in which London's anarchists protested against the Italo-Turkish War, Belelli spread the allegation that Malatesta was an agent of the Ottoman government.

Malatesta responded by publishing a manifesto entitled Alla Colonia italiana di Londra (Per un fatto personale) (To the Italian Community of London: On a Personal Matter), in which he publicly denounced the suspicions that had long surrounded Belelli. Although acknowledging that he had not yet succeeded in proving the allegations, Malatesta invited Belelli to submit himself to the judgement of a court of honour and to explain the source of his income.

Belelli rejected the proposal and brought a defamation action against Malatesta before the British courts. According to claims made by Italian anarchists in the special publication La Gogna, Belelli had been encouraged to take legal action by Inspector Francis Powell of Scotland Yard's Special Branch.

=== The 1912 trial ===
The legal dispute was initially examined at the Marlborough Street Police Court before proceeding to London's Old Bailey, where the trial took place on 20 May 1912.

During the hearing, Belelli stated that he worked as a bookseller and had long since abandoned anarchist ideas. He also denied having accused Malatesta of being a spy for the Turkish government. During this stage of the proceedings, Belelli was assisted by the interpreter Enrico Bojada, who had previously collaborated with the Italian police informant Giuseppe Prina.

Malatesta stated that he worked as an electrical engineer and had maintained personal relations with Belelli, including giving arithmetic lessons to his children. He nevertheless disputed Belelli's alleged commercial activity, asserting that he had never seen him sell books during the preceding five or six years. Malatesta reiterated his belief that Belelli obtained his livelihood by acting as an informant for the Italian police.

During the trial, numerous anarchists testified in Malatesta's defence. Some confirmed that Belelli had accused Malatesta of being a Turkish spy, while others challenged his claim to be a bookseller. In particular, two anarchists, Ludovico Brida and Giovanni Moroni, whom Belelli had identified as having purchased books from him for substantial amounts of money, stated that their purchases had amounted to only a few shillings.

Despite these testimonies, the jury concluded that the accusations against Belelli had not been sufficiently substantiated and found Malatesta guilty of criminal libel.

Following the verdict, Inspector Powell was permitted to give a statement in which he described Malatesta as a dangerous anarchist, referring to his alleged connections with criminal circles and with some of the men involved in the Houndsditch robbery.

The court subsequently sentenced Malatesta to three months' imprisonment and ordered him to pay the legal costs, recommending his deportation from the United Kingdom under the provisions of the Aliens Act 1905.

The sentence provoked a widespread campaign in support of Malatesta, as numerous representatives of the British left and sections of the liberal press regarded the conviction as a threat to Britain's tradition of granting political asylum.

A large demonstration was held in Trafalgar Square on 9 June 1912, attended by at least 15,000 people according to the anarchist press.

=== Later years ===
The trial brought Belelli's clandestine activities within London's anarchist community to an end.

His identification as the agent Virgilio was subsequently confirmed by archival documentation examined in the 21st century by the historian Pietro Di Paola. In particular, a communication dated September 1901 concerning an anarchist arriving from America who was being accommodated by Belelli in Paris corresponds to a note from the Italian Ministry of the Interior addressed to Police Commissioner Neri that attributes the same incident to Virgilio.

This correspondence provides direct evidence identifying Belelli with Virgilio, who collaborated with the Italian authorities for approximately twelve years.

Following the trial, Belelli left London and returned to Reggio Emilia, where he remained until 1918. He subsequently moved for a period to San Prospero Strinati, before returning once again to Reggio Emilia, where he spent the final years of his life.

== Bibliography ==
- Di Paola, Pietro (2007). "The Spies Who Came in from the Heat: The International Surveillance of the Anarchists in London". European History Quarterly. 37 (2): 189–215. doi:10.1177/0265691407075591.
- Di Paola, Pietro (2013). The Knights Errant of Anarchy: London and the Italian Anarchist Diaspora (1880–1917). Liverpool: Liverpool University Press. ISBN 9781846319693.
