= Special rapporteur =

Special rapporteur is a title given to individuals working on behalf of various regional and international organizations who bear specific mandates to investigate, monitor and recommend solutions to specific topics or concerns, such as human rights issues.

- United Nations special rapporteur
- African Union special rapporteur
- Organization of American States special rapporteur

== Canada ==
In Canadian domestic politics, the title may refer to the appointment of David Johnston (governor general) to investigate Chinese government interference in the 2019 and 2021 Canadian federal elections.

== See also ==
- Rapporteur, a person appointed by an organization to report on the proceedings of its meetings
