= Life interest =

A life interest (or life rent in Scotland) is a form of right, usually under a trust, that lasts only for the lifetime of the person benefiting from that right. A person with a life interest is known as a life tenant.

A life interest ends when the life tenant dies.

An interest in possession trust is the most common example of a life interest trust. In a typical interest in possession trust, the life tenant receives all the income from the trust for the rest of his or her life. On the life tenant's death, the trust comes to an end, and the capital of the trust is paid to another person, known as the remainderman, as specified by the trust document.

One form of life interest is a life estate, an ownership interest in property that lasts for the life of the party to whom it has been granted. Unlike the beneficiary of a trust, the owner of a life estate in property has the right to possession of the property and may use it as any other owner, subject only to a duty to avoid waste of the property value affecting parties with a future interest.

== See also ==
- Personal injury trust
