= Howe v Earl of Dartmouth =

English trusts law case

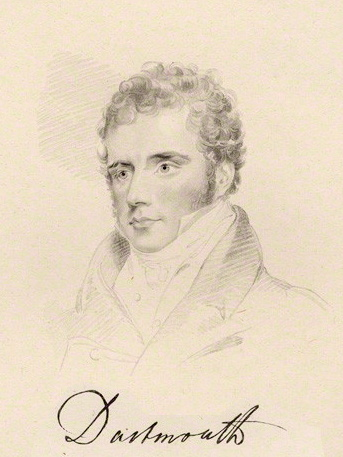
- The Fourth Earl of Dartmouth
- Full case name: Howe v Earl of Dartmouth, Howe v Countess of Aylesbury
- Decided: 22 May 1802
- Citations: (1802) 7 Ves 137 [1775-1802] All ER 24; 32 ER 56

Court membership
- Judge sitting: Lord Eldon LC

Keywords
- trusts, apportionment between beneficiaries, remainderman

Howe v Earl of Dartmouth (1802) 7 Ves 137 is an English trusts law case. It laid down the rule of equity in relation to the duties of a trustee in relation to a trust fund where there are successive interests in relation to the trust fund, and seeks to strike a fair balance between the rights of the life tenant and the remainderman. It is one of a number of highly technical common law rules which causes considerable angst where wills and trusts have not been professionally prepared.

The general rule in relation to any trust fund is that the life tenant is entitled to all of the income, and the remainderman then takes all of the capital on the death of the life tenant. Under the rule in Howe v Earl of Dartmouth there may be duty to convert and reinvest authorised investments in the trust fund to maintain fairness between the life tenant and the remainderman.

There are two limbs to the rule:

1. investment; and
2. apportionment.

== Investment ==
The first limb of the rule establishes that, subject to any contrary provision in the will, there is a duty to convert where residuary personalty is settled by will in favour of persons who are to enjoy it in succession. The trustees should convert all such parts of the residuary fund which are wasting, or which are future or reversionary in nature or consist of unauthorised securities into a property of a permanent or income bearing character.

So property such as speculative investments, royalties, copyrights, and, in some jurisdictions, leaseholds, should be converted in the interest of the remainderman. These are considered to be non-permanent investments, and may be of significantly reduced or no value by the time of the death of the life tenant. On the other hand "future" property, such as a remainder or a reversionary interest, or other property which at present produces no income, is of no immediate benefit to the life tenant. In the interest of the life tenant, such property should be converted into income bearing properties.

In practical terms, the rule is of relatively limited application. It does not apply to property settled inter vivos. It does not apply to specific residuary bequests.

== Apportionment ==
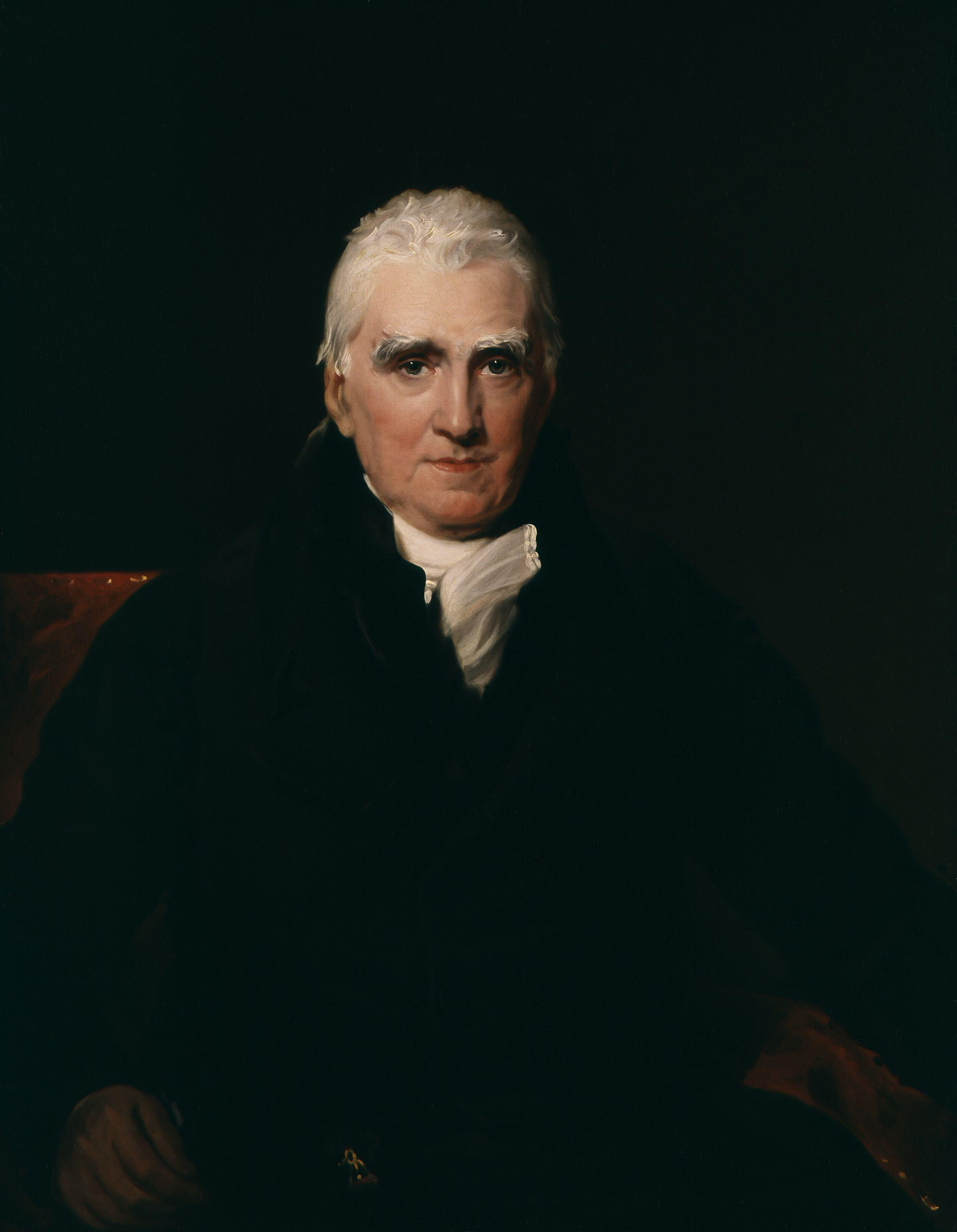
Lord Eldon LC

Where there is a duty to convert under the rule in Howe v Earl of Dartmouth, there is, in the absence of an intention that the life tenant shall enjoy the income until sale, the second limb of the rule is that the trustee is under a duty also to apportion the property fairly between the life tenant and the remainderman until conversion. The specific rules relating to apportionment are often considered overly technical.

=== Wasting, hazardous or unauthorised investments ===
The law assumes that wasting, hazardous or unauthorised investments produce income which exceeds what a life tenant ought reasonably to receive, and that it does so at the expense of the security of the capital. Accordingly, the apportionment is made that:

- the life tenant receives an income which represents the current yield on authorised investments, and
- the excess is added to the capital,

but, subject to the proviso that:

- if the interest received is less than 4 per cent., the balance should be made up out of subsequently accruing income, or from the proceeds of the unauthorised investments when sold.

=== Future, reversionary or other non-income producing property ===
The law assumes that future property is of no benefit to the life tenant, and thus must be sold to obtain income producing investments. The proceeds of sale are apportioned between the life tenant and the remainderman by using the formulae set out in Re Earl of Chesterfield's Trusts (1883) 24 Ch D 643. This provides that the sum which is reserved for the remainderman is the sum "which, put out at 4 per cent. per annum ... and accumulating at compound interest at that rate with yearly rests, and deducting income tax at the standard rate, would, with accumulation of interest, have produced, at the respective dates of receipt, the amounts actually received; and that the aggregate of the sums so ascertained ought to be treated as principal and be applied accordingly, and the residue should be treated as income." Or, put another way, the principal (which goes to capital for the remainderman) is the sum which, if invested at 4 per cent. at the date of the testator's death, would have produced the sum now received, and the income is assumed to be everything else (which goes to the life tenant).

=== Contrary intention ===
All the rules above are subject to any contrary intention being expressed by the testator. The onus is upon the person asserting that the equitable rules are excluded to establish that this is so.

== Modern application ==
The duty to apportion is, in practice, nearly always excluded in any professionally drafted will, both in respect of income from unauthorised securities and in respect of reversionary interests.

In modern times, the rules of conversion and apportionment are generally considered to be out of step with modern investing practice. The problem with speculative and wasting securities is still the same today, but the rule requires that unauthorised investments to be sold in order to "protect" the capital for the benefit of the remainderman, and it deprives the life tenant of the higher income to be earned from such investments. However, as the Law Commission of England and Wales has noted: "At a time when investment in equities may be the only way in which the capital value of the fund can in fact be maintained the traditional theory that re-investment is necessary to protect those interested in the capital no longer holds good."

=== Reform ===
In the United Kingdom the Law Reform Committee recommended replacing the rule (together with other highly technical common law rules, such as the rule in Re Atkinson and the rule in Allhusen v Whittell) with a general statutory duty to hold a fair balance between the tenant for life and the remainderman, with an express power to convert income into capital and vice versa, and a duty to convert and apportion to the extent necessary to maintain an even hand and in a manner consistent with the whole investment policy of the reversionary trust fund.

These recommendations were implemented in the Trust (Capital and Income) Act 2013, which came into force on 1 October 2013. However, the Act only has effect for those trusts arising on or after that date; the points outlined above continue to be relevant to trusts created prior to that date, unless the trust instrument specifically excludes them.

Most other common law jurisdictions have considered reform of one or both of the limbs of the rule in Howe v Earl of Dartmouth but in practice most have not done so.
