= Rule in Shelley's Case =

1581 common law rule relating to land

The Rule in Shelley's Case is a rule of law that may apply to certain future interests in real property and trusts created in common law jurisdictions. It was applied as early as 1366 in The Provost of Beverly's Case but in its present form is derived from Shelley's Case (1581), in which counsel stated the rule as follows:

when the ancestor by any gift or conveyance takes an estate of freehold, and in the same gift or conveyance an estate is limited either mediately or immediately to his heirs in fee simple or in fee tail; that always in such cases, "the heirs" are words of limitation of the estate, not words of purchase.

The rule was reported by Lord Coke in England in the 17th century as well-settled law. In England, it was abolished by the Law of Property Act 1925. During the twentieth century, it was abolished in most common law jurisdictions, including the majority of the states of the United States. However, in states where the abrogation has been interpreted to apply only to conveyances made after abrogation, the relevance of the rule today varies from jurisdiction to jurisdiction and in many states remains unclear.

== History ==
The 1366 application of the rule in common law closely followed Occam's razor, William of Ockham's articulation of the problem-solving principle that "entities should not be multiplied without necessity". The eponymous litigation was brought about because of a settlement made by Sir William Shelley (1480–1549), an English judge, on an estate he purchased when Sion Monastery was dissolved. The decision was rendered by Lord Chancellor Sir Thomas Bromley, who presided over an assembly of all the judges (Note: In modern terminology, this is an en banc decision.) on the King's Bench to hear the case during Easter term 1580–81. The rule existed in English common law long before this case was brought to the court, but Shelley's Case gave the law its most famous application.

== Summary of the rule ==
The Rule in Shelley's Case provides that a conveyance which attempts to give a person a life estate, with a remainder to that person's heirs, will instead give both the life estate and the remainder to that person. Absent an intervening vested future interest, the life estate and the remainder will merge and the conveyance gives that person the land in fee simple absolute (full ownership without restriction).

Suppose Joe has a rich relative who considers Joe careless and imprudent, but who wishes to ensure that Joe's children are provided for. The relative might try to deed a house "to Joe for life, and then to Joe's heirs", thus ensuring that Joe and his family could live in the house, but Joe could not sell it to pay gambling debts. The "remaindermen" in this case are Joe's heirs. The Rule in Shelley's Case states that, this language notwithstanding, Joe is the absolute owner of the property.

== Issue ==
When an owner of land in fee simple died, the lord of the fee was entitled to "incidents of tenure" deriving from the descent to the heir (analogous to the modern day estate tax). Large landowners who desired the life tenant (who was perhaps the landowner himself, conveying through a straw party) to avoid the estate tax attempted to create a future interest in the form of a remainder in the heirs of that life tenant. It was the intention of the landowner or testator to allow the heirs of the life tenant, once ascertained at the natural expiration of his life estate, to take as purchasers by way of the original executed conveyance, and not by descent, avoiding the tax.

Thus, in a basic conveyance absent the rule (e.g., "O grants Blackacre to B for life, then to B's heirs") there was a life estate in B, and a contingent remainder in B's heirs. The rule converted the contingent remainder in B's heirs into a vested remainder in B.

The rule's effect ended there. After that, the doctrine of merger operated on the two successive freehold estates placed in the same purchaser (B's life estate and B's remainder in fee simple) and converted them into a single fee simple absolute in B.

B's heirs, necessarily ascertained only at B's death, (Note: Living people have no heirs. B's children and B's heirs are not the same set of individuals. If B has children, they will become B's heirs only if they survive B, which is not guaranteed. It is important not to confuse "heirs presumptive" (which children probably are, under most intestacy statutes) and "heirs" (which children might become provided they survive the ancestor whose property to which they are entitled, absent contrary intent expressed in a will).) could only take B's fee simple by descent and had to pay the tax.

Thus, a conveyance to B for life, then to B's children, where B has living children C, D, and E, does not violate the rule because the class members are ascertained, and new ascertained members may join the class so long as B, the class member producer, lives (plus nine months if he is male).

== Generalized rule ==
Simply stated, the rule deals with remainders in the transfer of real property by deed. A remainder is a right "carved out" of the fee simple which has some future interest so that, at some later date, the holder of the remainder (the future interest) would have ownership rights in the property and those future rights would have to be preserved. The rights could not be sold. It has been explained as an attempt to prevent the sale of property once transferred by putting such limiting words in the deed of transfer.

It is a classic example of common law legal reasoning and the logic involved in the interpretation of legal text which is why it continues to be an important teaching tool in the study of the common law. However, while it is an important interpretation tool, it should not be confused with a rule of construction (such as the doctrine of worthier title) as it is a rule of law. The distinction is that a rule of law cannot be overcome by proof of the grantor's intent, while a rule of construction can be.

== Analysis ==
Some scholars, such as John V. Orth, believe that this explanation (to promote the right to transfer the land) of the origin of the rule is inaccurate. In his view, the rule originated as the courts' response to an estate-planning technique in the 14th century, long before the litigation in Shelley's Case. A tax known as the "relief" had to be paid to the feudal lord (the Crown) when a tenant's heir inherited the land. To avoid this estate tax, if the grant to the land were framed in term of a life estate in the grantee followed by a remainder in the grantee's heirs, then upon the grantee's death his heirs would not inherit the land, but received it as a vested remainder. As a consequence, the heir would take the land without having to pay the relief. The courts could not abide such a transparent attempt to circumvent the tax system, and the rule was invented to deal with this problem by converting these transfers into fees simple absolute so as to allow the relief to be collected upon the grantee's death. Later, when the relief was abolished, the rule continued to survive in the common law due to inertia ("it is the genius of the common law to add, but not to subtract"), the "promote the right to transfer the land" explanation was concocted to explain the continued existence of the rule. It is not at all uncommon for rules of common law, once their original motivation falls away, to acquire a new justification, and in the process also, sometimes, a new meaning. Many examples of such processes are given in Oliver Wendell Holmes's The Common Law.

As stated by Lord Edward Coke in his argument for the defendant in the case:

It is a rule of law, when the ancestor by any gift or conveyance takes an estate in freehold, and in the same gift or conveyance an estate is limited mediately or immediately to his heirs in fee or in tail; that always in such cases the heirs are words of limitation of the [ancestor's] estate and not words of purchase.

== See also ==
- Rule against perpetuities
