= Executory contract =

Contract not fully performed or executed

An executory contract is a contract that has not yet been fully performed or fully executed. It is a contract in which both sides still have important performance remaining. However, an obligation to pay money, even if such obligation is material, does not usually make a contract executory. An obligation is material if a breach of contract would result from the failure to satisfy the obligation. A contract that has been fully performed by one party but not by the other party is not an executory contract.

== Installment contracts ==
Many installment contracts are commonly executory such as installment credit loans, period loan payments, mortgages, paychecks, and contracts for the delivery of goods or the performance of services over a period of time in discrete elements.

Missed deliveries under an installment have on occasion given rise to the legal question of whether they are indicative of a breach of contract, allowing the other party to terminate the contract, or whether the contract should continue. In the case of Maple Flock Co Ltd v Universal Furniture Products (Wembley) Ltd., decided in 1934, Hewart LCJ used reasoning drawn from an earlier case, Freeth v Burr, and approved in Mersey Steel and Iron Company v. Naylor, Benzon and Co.: “That the true question is whether the acts and conduct of the party evince an intention no longer to be bound by the contract". In applying this reasoning to a situation of a missed delivery, the court concluded that the main issues were (i) the ratio quantitively between the breach and the contract as a whole, and (ii) the degree of probability or improbability, that the omission might be repeated. In this case, the 16th delivery of flock out of 67 deliveries planned for the contract was defective: the ratio was low and the existence of a good quality control system confirmed that the defective provision was unlikely to be repeated.

== In US bankruptcy law ==
A common area where executory contracts are found is US bankruptcy law, where obligations exist for both parties to a contract at the time of a bankruptcy petition. In cases such as this, both the debtor, or the side that is filing for bankruptcy, and counterparty, or the side contracting with the debtor, may have to make further performance. At the start of a chapter 7, 12, 13, and sometimes 11 bankruptcy proceedings, a trustee (also known as a debtor in possession) is appointed to oversee the case. The trustee has the power to assume, reject, or assign an executory contract.

=== Assumption ===
If the trustee chooses to assume an executory contract, the obligations of both the debtor and the counterparts are preserved by the bankruptcy process. A bankruptcy court must approve a debtor's decision to assume or reject an executory contract. However, because the Bankruptcy Code does not outline an official standard for determining a motion to assume or reject an executory contract, many courts will employ a business judgment test, which hinges on whether a debtor can show that its decision is an exercise of its sound business judgment and that the assumption of the contract or lease will benefit the debtor's estate. See In re MF Global Holdings Ltd., 466 B.R. 239, 242 (Bankr. S.D.N.Y. 2012). If the debtor has already defaulted on the executory contract before filing for bankruptcy, it will be required to provide adequate assurance that it can perform the contract. The following factors are often used in the business judgment test.

- Whether the debtor's financial data indicates its ability to generate an income stream sufficient to meet its obligations
- The general economic outlook in the debtor's industry
- The presence of a guarantee
- The debtor's payment history
- Presence of a security deposit
- Evidence of profitability
- Plan that would earmark money exclusively for the landlord or non-debtor party
- Whether an unexpired lease is at, or below, the prevailing rate

=== Rejection ===
If the trustee rejects the executory contract, there is a breach of contract as of the date of the petition, and the debtor is relieved from future performance. As a result of a rejection, the counterparty's claim on damages becomes classified as a general unsecured claim that arose before the bankruptcy filing. If a debtor wants to reject a contract, it must reject the contract in toto and cannot cherry pick a few provisions to reject.

=== Assignment ===
If a debtor assumes an executory contract, such contract or lease may be subsequently assigned, subject to certain limitations. Prior to assignment, the debtor must provide adequate assurance of future performance by the proposed assignee to the non-debtor contract party regardless of whether the debtor is in default under such contract or lease. Usually, the debtor does not need to give adequate assurance for every term of an executory contract but rather those that are materially and economically significant. Fleming, 499 F.3d at 305. However, if the trustee decides to assign the executory contract, all of the assets of a debtor will go to a trust for liquidation and distribution to the creditors. Any assets that remain after the distribution will go back to the debtor.

=== Chapter 7 - Liquidation ===
In a chapter 7 liquidation proceeding, a trustee must assume or reject executory contracts that involve an ordinary business purchase or sale of a security within 30 days of the date of order for relief. If the trustee does not take action within those 30 days, the contract is by default rejected.

=== Debtor strategies for drafting executory contracts ===
Non-debtors are more likely to receive their consideration if they are able to terminate their executory contracts with a debtor before the debtor files for bankruptcy. This is because after the filing, the debtor has the option of rejecting or assuming the agreement and is not required to exercise this option before confirmation of a plan of reorganization. To protect their side of the contract, the non-debtor can consider adding protections to the language such as financial reporting requirements, financial covenants, and automatic termination provisions.

Counsel might also consider including a termination for convenience provision. Termination for convenience, otherwise known as at-will, provides a party with the right to terminate an agreement for any or no reason. In order to allow a non-terminating party to make alternative business plans and prepare to wind down its operations with the terminating party, most termination-at-will provisions require the terminating party to provide the other party with a certain number of days' advance written notice of its intention. However, as long as the terms comply with applicable non-bankruptcy law (such as the Uniform Commercial Code, if applicable), the parties are generally free to negotiate a short notice period, or the removal of any notice. When dealing with a distressed company, counsel for the non-debtor should balance the objective of a limited or no notice period for termination for convenience against other business objectives and needs.

== Intellectual property license executory contracts ==
There are three types of intellectual property licenses: patents, copyrights, and trademarks. Contracts involving IP licenses in exchange for royalties are generally classified as executory contracts in the bankruptcy context, as the two parties owe each other continuing material obligations. The court will look at two factors in determining whether a license agreement is executory:

1. whether performance remains due on the part of both the licensee and the licensor such that the failure to perform by either party would constitute a material breach, and
2. whether those remaining obligations are sufficient to show that the license is in fact an executory contract.

=== Patent licenses ===
Patent licenses are typically executory in nature because both the licensees and the licensors generally have ongoing obligations. The licensee is continuously obligated to pay royalties to the licensor for the term of the license agreement, thereby making the agreement executory on the licensee's side. On the other side, the licensor is obligated to defend claims of infringement, provide a non-exclusive licensee with notice of patent infringement suits, refraining from licensing the intellectual property to other parties at a lower royalty rate, and indemnify the licensee for losses.

=== Copyright licenses ===
Copyright licenses differ slightly from patent licenses. A copyright licensee will almost always retain the ongoing obligation to publish, distribute, account for and pay royalties for such distribution. However, a copyright licensor, unlike a patent licensor, will often lack ongoing obligations under the license beyond the implied or explicit covenant not to sue the licensee.

Under an exclusive license, the licensee receives an interest in the underlying copyright and the licensor will often lack ongoing obligations. Thus, exclusive licenses are not likely to be classified as executory contracts. Nonetheless, these licenses can still be considered executory if a copyright license was issued at a time when the work was expected to be revised or adapted. In this case, a licensor may also have ongoing marketing or software updating obligations, making the license executory.

Whether a copyright license is exclusive or non-exclusive may also impact its classification as en executory contract. Under exclusive licenses, the licensor usually does not have continuing obligations because the licensee gained an interest in the underlying copyright. Since non-exclusive licensees do not receive any ownership interest, almost all such licenses are considered executory contracts.

=== Trademark licenses ===
In trademark licenses, both parties to the license agreement have ongoing obligations, making them typically seen as executory contracts. The licensor has the duty to ensure the quality of the trademark, check for infringement on behalf of licensees, enforce the trademark for the benefit of the licensee, and indemnify the licensee for any damages, expenses, and attorneys' fees.

=== Intellectual property in bankruptcy ===
Breaches involving executory contracts involving intellectual property are treated the same both outside and inside bankruptcy law. In Mission Prod. Holdings v. Tempnology, LLC, petitioner Mission Product Holdings entered into a contract with Respondent Tempnology, LLC, which gave Mission a license to use Tempnology's trademarks in connection with the distribution of certain clothing and accessories. Mission Product alleged that Tempnology wrongly sought to reject its agreement with Mission when it filed for Chapter 11 bankruptcy. Even though section 365 of the Bankruptcy Code allows a debtor to “reject any executory contract," the court held that Tempnology still had to allow Mission to use its trademarks. It reasoned that since a licensor's breach cannot revoke continuing rights given to a counterparty under a contract outside bankruptcy, the same result must follow from rejection (a breach) in bankruptcy. The rights to the trademark were previously granted, so a breach by the grantor in bankruptcy could not rescind those rights.

== Real property executory contracts ==
Breaches of real estate property leases, executory contracts by nature, entitle the counterparty to the breach to damages measured by the present value of the rent reserved less the present rental value of the remainder of the term of the lease. In Connecticut R. & Lighting Co. v. Palmer, the Connecticut Railway and Lighting Company leased certain gas, electric and street railway properties for 999 years to the Consolidated Railway Company and Hartford Railroad Company (New Haven) in 1906. In 1935, New Haven filed its petition for bankruptcy, which was approved by the court. The court then appointed New Haven as the trustee, and New Haven rejected the 1906 lease. The Connecticut Railway then sued the New Haven estate for $23,190,314.73 as damages for its rejection and therefore breach of the lease.

Previously, the bankruptcy court had only allowed Connecticut R. & Lighting Co. to receive damages accrued within 18 months after the date New Haven rejected the contract, calculated by subtracting the net earnings of the property from the rent reserved in the lease. The appellate court affirmed, but went further to allow damages to accrue to the latest possible hearing date. The court reversed the judgment and remanded the case, since the language of the Bankruptcy Act allowed damages for rejection of a lease and limited damages to actual damages. There was no other limitation. Thus, Connecticut R. & Lighting Co. could claim lost rent until the end of the lease as damages.

== Executory contracts in finance ==
=== Hedge executory contracts ===
In finance, executory contracts have a special function, to protect companies from currency risk. A hedged executory contract generally involves an agreement for the purchase or sale of some sort of asset or performance of service in the future mixed with a hedge, or a deposit of non-functional (foreign) currency in a separate account with a bank or other financial institution, and certain forward or futures contracts, that reduce the risk of exchange rate fluctuations.

Currency hedge executory contracts deal with non-functional currency in a separate account with a bank or other financial institution. They come in the form of forward or futures contracts, which is a set agreement to exchange one currency for another at a set rate in the future. Forward contracts are private transactions, whereas future contracts are traded on an exchange. Here is how a forward contract works.

Pretend, for example, that one dollar currently equals one euro in the foreign exchange market. If Ann wants a thousand euros a year from now because she is going on a trip to Spain, so she might enter into a forward contract to purchase one thousand euros for one thousand dollars with a bank at an exchange rate of one dollar to one euro. This contract is thus executory in nature because both sides have continuing obligations in the future. Now, no matter what the exchange rate of dollars to euros one year from now, Ann has the contracted option for buying one thousand euros for one thousand dollars.

Now, why might the bank enter into this deal with Ann? Well, the bank can profit from the transaction if a dollar becomes worth more euros one year from now. For instance, if a dollar becomes worth one and a half euros a year from now, the bank will be able to trade a thousand euros for a thousand dollars with Ann as contracted in the forward and then subsequently sell the one thousand dollars on the market for one thousand five hundred euros, netting a profit of five hundred euros. However, if the opposite happens and one dollar trades for less than one euro, the bank will lose money.

The hedge is integrated with the executory contract only if the executory contract is hedged in whole or in part through the accrual date. The accrual date is the date when an item of income or expense (including a capital expenditure) that relates to an executory contract is required to be accrued under the taxpayer's method of accounting. Because the amount taken into account under the executory contract must be fixed on the accrual date in terms of functional currency, §1.988-5T(b)(2)(iii)(D) provides that interest on a deposit of non-functional currency is considered part of a hedge only if it accrues on or before the accrual date. The definition of "hedged executory contract" in §1.988-5T(b)(2)(i) and the identification rules in §1.988-5T(b)(3) contain further conditions to integrated treatment that are analogous to those of §1.988-5T(a).

Under §1.988-5T(b)(4)(iii), if the taxpayer disposes of the executory contract prior to the accrual date, the hedge is treated as sold for fair market value on such date and any gain or loss is realized. If the hedge is disposed of prior to the accrual date, any gain or loss from the hedge is not recognized and is an adjustment to the inclusion, deduction, or basis under the executory contract.

== Executory contracts and film ==
Film contracts do not always seem to be executory in nature. The U.S. Court of Appeals for the Third Circuit provided some guidance on the question in Spyglass Media Group, LLC v. Bruce Cohen Productions (In re Weinstein Company Holdings LLC), 997 F.3d 497 (3d Cir. 2021). In the case, in 2011, Bruce Cohen contracted with The Weinstein Company to make the film Silver Linings Playbook. The contract was "work-made-for-hire," meaning that even though none of the picture's IP belonged to Cohen, he would be paid $250,000 in fixed initial compensation in addition to having the right to approximately 5% of the picture's future profits. TWC eventually filed for bankruptcy and owed Cohen $400,000 in film profits. Spyglass Media Group, LLC bought out TWC's assets and asked the court for a declaratory judgment that the Cohen agreement was not executory and, therefore, could not be assumed and assigned. The Third Circuit affirmed a previous lower court holding that a "work-made-for-hire" contract between a film company debtor and the producer of a motion picture was not executory in nature because Cohen did not have any ongoing "material obligations" and had already finished the film. The court reasoned that the parties to a contract can override the Bankruptcy Code's intended protections for a debtor in connection with certain contracts, but only by clearly and unambiguously providing that continuing obligations are material in the text of the agreement.

== See also ==
- Bankruptcy in the United States
- Chapter 11, Title 11, United States Code
- Charging order
- Executory interest
- Future interest
- Rule against perpetuities
