= Torquay Hotel Co Ltd v Cousins =

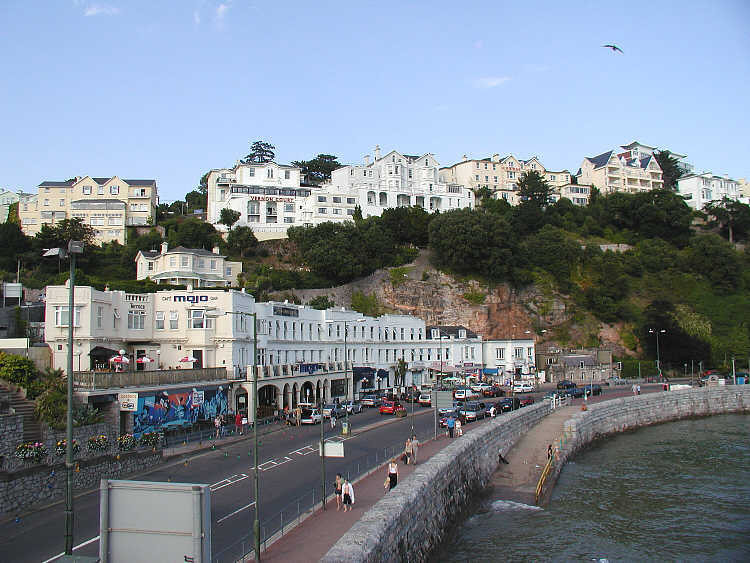
- Court: Court of Appeal of England and Wales
- Decided: 17 December 1968
- Citations: [1968] EWCA Civ 2 (BAILII), [1969] 2 Ch 106, [1969] 2 WLR 289, [1969] 1 All ER 522, 6 KIR 15

Court membership
- Judges sitting: Lord Denning MR, Russell LJ and Winn LJ

Case opinions
- Lord Denning MR

Keywords
- right to strike, economic tort, interference with contract

Torquay Hotel Co Ltd v Cousins [1968] EWCA Civ 2 (BAILII) is a UK labour law case concerning the liability of a union when its members take industrial action.

In it Lord Denning MR invented a new economic tort for interference with a contract. This was not there before, because economic torts had only existed where the result of some action was unlawful, for instance the breach of a contract, intimidation (see Tarleton v McGawley (1793) 1 Peake 270) or conspiracy to injure. The House of Lords has subsequently rejected the existence of a separate tort for interference with a contract which can be constituted without unlawful actions or without a contractual breach.

== Facts ==
Torquay Hotel Co Ltd had a contract for the supply of oil from Esso Petroleum Co Ltd. It contained a force majeure clause. The Transport and General Workers Union went on strike and blocked that supply. There was therefore no breach of contract by the Esso for failing to deliver. Torquary Hotel nevertheless sued the union, of which Mr Frank Cousins was the general secretary.

== Judgment ==
Lord Denning MR held that for the purpose of the trade union's liability, they were unable to rely on that clause to absolve themselves from liability for the economic loss they caused. The interference with the supply contract was enough to visit liability, even though under the plain meaning of the contract, there was no breach. His decision ran as follows.

Legal action by Imperial

By this time the Imperial Hotel had taken the advice of their solicitors. They determined to test the position by ordering some more oil from the Esso Company. On Friday, February 16, 1968, the Imperial Hotel ordered from Esso 3,000 gallons of oil for delivery on Monday, February 19. On Saturday, February 17, the solicitors to Imperial wrote to the officials of the Transport Union demanding that the "blacking" instructions should be withdrawn; and saying that, unless an undertaking was received by 1 p.m. on Monday, February 19, they would apply to the High Court. They also gave notice to them that there was an express contract between the Imperial and Esso for delivery of oil and summarised its terms.

It seems probable that the letter reached the Transport Union officials in time for them to withdraw the "blacking" instructions. At any rate, they seem to have done so, for on Monday, February 19, Esso delivered 3,000 gallons to the Imperial: and there were no pickets to stop it.

But the Transport Union officials did not give the undertaking. They did not even reply to the letter. So the Imperial Hotel issued a writ. On February 23 they obtained an injunction ex parte. On May 23 Stamp J., ante, p. 112A, granted an injunction until trial. The Transport Union and officials appeal to this court.

The reason why the Imperial Hotel apply for an injunction is essentially quia timet. No oil has in fact been stopped from reaching the Imperial Hotel: but the Imperial Hotel fear that the union and their officials will try to stop it unless the court intervenes. To obtain an injunction, the plaintiffs must show that the defendants are proposing to do something unlawful.

Many grounds of unlawfulness have been canvassed before us, including breach of contract, conspiracy and intimidation. The judge put the case on the broad ground that the defendants were proposing, without justification, to interfere with the contractual relations of the Imperial Hotel, ante, P. 118E-G. He granted an injunction to restrain the defendants from procuring a breach by any supplier of oil of contracts made or hereafter to be made for delivery of fuel-oil to the hotel. On the appeal the argument covered many points which I will take in order.

1. Was there a "trade dispute"?

There was, I think, a trade dispute between the Transport Union and the Torbay Hotel. The Torbay Hotel employed workers of the Transport Union. The union claimed that it should be recognised as having authority to negotiate on their behalf. The Torbay Hotel refused to recognise them. Such a recognition dispute is, I think, clearly a trade dispute (see Beetham v Trinidad Cement Ltd [1960] A.C. 132), and, none the less so, because it springs out of rivalry of one union with another union.

But I do not think there was a trade dispute between the Transport Union and the Imperial Hotel. The Imperial employed no members of the Transport Union. There was no dispute as to the wages of any of the workers in the Imperial, or as to their conditions of labour, or as to recognition on their behalf. Mr. Pain said that the Imperial Hotel, through its managing director, had taken sides in the dispute at the Torbay Hotel and could thus be regarded as parties to that dispute. But I do not think the evidence supports that view. No doubt Mr. Chapman sympathised with the employers at the Torbay, but sympathy with one side or the other does not make a person a party to the dispute.

The only question is whether the acts done by the trade union officials against the Imperial Hotel were done in furtherance of the trade dispute with the Torbay Hotel. I do not think they were. They were done in furtherance of the anger which they felt towards Mr. Chapman for having, as they said, "intervened" in the dispute. They were not furthering a trade dispute, but their own fury and the Act does not protect them any more than it did the defendants in Huntley v Thornton [1957] 1 W.L.R. 321: see Harman J., at p. 350. It follows that the trade union officials cannot pray in aid the provisions of sections 1, 2 and 3 of the Trade Disputes Act 1906. The position must be judged at common law.

2. Can the defendants take advantage of the force majeure clause?

The Imperial Hotel had a contract with Esso under which the Imperial Hotel agreed to buy their total requirements of fuel-oil from Esso for one year, the quantity being estimated at 120,000 gallons, to be delivered by road tank wagon at a minimum of 3,000 gallons a time. Under that contract there was a course of dealing by which the Imperial Hotel used to order 3,000 gallons every week or 10 days, and Esso used to deliver it the next day. But there was a force majeure or exception clausewhich said that "neither party shall be liable for any failure to fulfil any term of this agreement if fulfilment is delayed, hindered or prevented by any circumstance whatever which is not within their immediate control, including ... labour disputes."

It is plain that, if delivery was hindered or prevented by labour disputes, as, for instance, because their drivers would not cross the picket line, Esso could rely on that exception clause as a defence to any claim by Imperial. They would not be liable in damages. and I am prepared to assume that Esso would not be guilty of a breach of contract. But I do not think that would exempt the trade union officials from liability if they unlawfully hindered or prevented Esso from making deliveries. The principle of Lumley v Gye (1853) 2 E. & B. 216 extends not only to inducing breach of contract, but also to preventing the performance of it. That can be shown by a simple illustration taken from the books. In Lumley v Gye, Miss Wagner, an actress, was engaged by Mr. Lumley to sing at Her Majesty's Theatre. Mr. Gye, who ran Covent Garden, procured her to break her contract with Mr. Lumley by promising to pay her more: see Lumley v Wagner (1852) 1 De G.M. & G. 604. He was held liable to Mr. Lumley for inducing a breach of contract. In Poussard v Spiers & Pond (1876) 1 QBD 410 Madam Poussard was under contract with Spiers to sing in an opera at the Criterion Theatre. She fell sick and was unable to attend rehearsals. Her non-performance, being occasioned by sickness, was not a breach of contract on her part: but it was held to excuse the theatre company from continuing to employ her. Suppose now that an ill-disposed person, knowing of her contract, had given her a potion to make her sick. She would not be guilty of a breach herself. But undoubtedly the person who administered the potion would have done wrong and be liable for the damage suffered by them. So here I think the trade union officials cannot take advantage of the force majeure or exception clause in the Esso contract. If they unlawfully prevented or hindered Esso from making deliveries, as ordered by Imperial, they would be liable in damage to Imperial, notwithstanding the exception clause. There is another reason too. They could not rely on an excuse of which they themselves had been "the mean" to use Lord Coke's language: see New Zealand Shipping Co Ltd v Société des Ateliers et Chantiers de France [1919] AC 1, 7, 8.

The principles of law

The principle of Lumley v Gye (1853) 2 E. & B. 216is that each of the parties to a contract has a "right to the performance" of it: and it is wrong for another to procure one of the parties to break it or not to perform it. That principle was extended a step further by Lord Macnaghten in Quinn v Leathem [1901] A.C. 495, so that each of the parties has a right to have his "contractual relations" with the other duly observed. "It is," he said at p. 510, "a violation of legal right to interfere with contractual relations recognised by law if there be no sufficient justification for the interference. " That statement was adopted and applied by a strong board of the Privy Council in Jasperson v Dominion Tobacco Co. [1923] A.C. 709. It included Viscount Haldane and Lord Sumner. The time has come when the principle should be further extended to cover "deliberate and direct interference with the execution of a contract without that causing any breach." That was a point left open by Lord Reid in Stratford (JT) & Son Ltd v Lindley [1965] A.C. 269, 324. But the common law would be seriously deficient if it did not condemn such interference. It is this very case. The principle can be subdivided into three elements:

First, there must be interference in the execution of a contract. The interference is not confined to the procurement of a breach of contract. It extends to a case where a third person prevents or hinders one party from performing his contract, even though it be not a breach.

Second, the interference must be deliberate. The person must know of the contract or, at any rate, turn a blind eye to it and intend to interfere with it: see Emerald Construction Co v Lowthian [1966] 1 W.L.R. 691.

Third, the interference must be direct. Indirect interference will not do. Thus, a man who "corners the market" in a commodity may well know that it may prevent others from performing their contracts, but he is not liable to an action for so doing. A trade union official, who calls a strike on proper notice, may well know that it will prevent the employers from performing their contracts to deliver goods, but he is not liable in damages for calling it. Indirect interference is only unlawful if unlawful means are used. I went too far when I said in Daily Mirror Newspapers Ltd v Gardner [1968] 2 Q.B. 762, 782 that there was no difference between direct and indirect interference. On reading once again Thomson (DC) & Co Ltd v Deakin [1952] Ch. 646, with more time, I find there is a difference. Morris L.J., at p. 702, there draws the very distinction between "direct persuasion to breach of contract " which is unlawful in itself: and "the intentional bringing about of a breach by indirect methods involving wrongdoing." This distinction must be maintained, else we should take away the right to strike altogether. Nearly every trade union official who calls a strike - even on due notice? as in Morgan v Fry [1968] 2 QB 710 - knows that it may prevent the employers from performing their contracts. He may be taken even to intend it. Yet no one has supposed hitherto that it was unlawful: and we should not render it unlawful today. A trade union official is only in the wrong when he procures a contracting party directly to break his contract, or when he does it indirectly by unlawful means. On reconsideration of the Daily Mirror case [1968] 2 QB 762, I think that the defendants there interfered directly by getting the retailers as their agents to approach the wholesalers.

I must say a word about unlawful means, because that brings in another principle. I have always understood that if one person deliberately interferes with the trade or business of another, and does so by unlawful means, that is, by an act which he is not at liberty to commit, then he is acting unlawfully, even though he does not procure or induce any actual breach of contract. If the means are unlawful, that is enough. Thus in Rookes v Barnard [1964] A.C. 1129 (as explained by Lord Reid in Stratford v Lindley [1965] A.C. 269, 325 and Lord Upjohn, at p. 337) the defendants interfered with the employment of Rookes - and they did it by unlawful means, namely, by intimidation of his employers - and they were held to be acting unlawfully, even though the employers committed no breach of contract as they gave Rookes proper notice. and in Stratford v Lindley [1965] A.C. 269, the defendants interfered with the business of Stratford - and they did it by unlawful means, namely, by inducing the men to break their contracts of employment by refusing to handle the barges - and they were held to be acting unlawfully, even in regard to new business of Stratford which was not the subject of contract. Lord Reid said, at p. 324:

The respondents' action made it practically impossible for the appellants to do any new business with the barge hirers. It was not disputed that such interference is tortious if any unlawful means are employed.

So also on the second point in Daily Mirror v Gardner [1968] 2 QB 762, the defendants interfered with the business of the "Daily Mirror" - and they did it by a collective boycott which was held to be unlawful under the Restrictive Trade Practices Act, 1956 - and they were held to be acting unlawfully.

This point about unlawful means is of particular importance when a place is declared "black." At common law it often involves the use of unlawful means. Take the Imperial Hotel. When it was declared "black," it meant that the drivers of the tankers would not take oil to the hotel. The drivers would thus be induced to break their contracts of employment. That would be unlawful at common law. The only case in which "blacking" of such a kind is lawful is when it is done "in contemplation or furtherance of a trade dispute." It is then protected by section 3 of the Trade Disputes Act, 1906: see Thomson (DC) & Co Ltd v Deakin [1952] Ch. 646, 662, 663 by Upjohn J.; for, in that event, the act of inducing a breach of a contract of employment is a lawful act which is not actionable at the suit of anyone: see Stratford v Lindley [1965] A.C. 269, 303 by Salmon L.J., and Morgan v Fry [1968] 2 Q.B. 710, 728 by myself. Seeing that the act is lawful, it must, I think, be lawful for the trade union officials to tell the employers and their customers about it. and this is so, even though it does mean that those people are compelled to break their commercial contracts. The interference with the commercial contracts is only indirect, and not direct: see what Lord Upjohn said in Stratford v Lindley [1965] A.C. 269, 337. So, if there had been a "trade dispute" in this case, I think it would have protected the trade union officials when they informed Esso that the dispute with Imperial was an "official dispute" and said that the hotel was "blacked." It would be like the "blacking" of the barges in Stratford v Lindley [1965] A.C. 269, where we held, in the Court of Appeal, at pp. 276-307, that, on the basis that there was a "trade dispute," the defendants were not liable.

Applying the principle in this case

Seeing that there was no "trade dispute" this case falls to be determined by the common law. It seems to me that the trade union officials deliberately and directly interfered with the execution of the contract between the Imperial Hotel and Esso. They must have known that there was a contract between the Imperial Hotel and Esso. Why otherwise did they on that very first Saturday afternoon telephone the bulk plant at Plymouth? They may not have known with exactitude all the terms of the contract. But no more did the defendants in Stratford v Lindley, at p. 332. They must also have intended to prevent the performance of the contract. That is plain from the telephone message: "Any supplies of fuel-oil will be stopped being made." and the interference was direct. It was as direct as could be - a telephone message from the trade union official to the bulk plant.

Take next the supplies from Alternative Fuels. The first wagon got through. As it happened, there was no need for the Imperial Hotel to order any further supplies from Alternative Fuels. But suppose they had given a further order, it is quite plain that the trade union officials would have done their best to prevent it being delivered. Their telephone messages show that they intended to prevent supplies being made by all means in their power. By threatening "repercussions" they interfered unlawfully with the performance of any future order which Imperial Hotel might give to Alternative Fuels. and the interference was direct again. It was direct to Alternative Fuels. Such interference was sufficient to warrant the grant of an injunction quia timet.

Is the trade union liable?

I do not think an injunction should have been granted against the trade union. Section 4 (1) of the Trade Union Act 1906, says that:

An action against a trade union ... in respect of any tortious act alleged to have been committed by or on behalf of the trade union, shall not be entertained in any court.

That section clearly prohibits an action for damages. But does it prevent an action for an injunction? The words are a "tortious act alleged to have been committed." Take a continuing tort, such as nuisance: or a repeated tort, such as unlawful picketing. It would be strange if a trade union could not be sued for the wrong done before the writ, but could be sued for the selfsame wrong to be done in the future. I am sure that the legislature never so intended. The section was intended to over-rule the Taff Vale case (Taff Vale Railway Co v The Amalgamated Society of Railway Workers) [1901] AC 426, and that was an action for "an injunction and such further relief as the court shall direct."

After reconsideration, I would still follow the views of Scrutton and Atkin LJJ, in Ware and De Freville Ltd v Motor Trade Association [1921] 3 KB 40, 75, 92 and hold that the section prohibits not only an action for damages for a tort, but also an action for an injunction, against a trade union.

So far as the other defendants are concerned, I have been in some doubt whether there is sufficient evidence to include Mr. Cousins. But I think it plain that the London headquarters were consulted on developments at Torquay, and took an active part in the action taken against Alternative Fuels. The affidavit of Mr. Cousins is not so explicit as to exempt him from cognisance of what was happening. In my opinion, the injunction should stand as the judge ordered, save that the trade union should be struck out.

Conclusion

Other wrongs were canvassed, such as conspiracy and intimidation, but I do not think it necessary to go into these. I put my decision on the simple ground that there is evidence that the defendants intended to interfere directly and deliberately with the execution of the existing contracts by Esso and future contracts by Alternative Fuels so as to prevent those companies supplying oil to the Imperial Hotel This intention was sufficiently manifest to warrant the granting of an injunction. The form of the injunction was criticised by Mr. Pain, but it follows the form suggested by Lord Upjohn in Stratford v Lindley [1965] AC 269, 339, and I think it is in order.

I find myself in substantial agreement with the judge and would dismiss this appeal.

== See also ==
- UK labour law
- DHN Food Distributors Ltd v Tower Hamlets London Borough Council [1976] 1 WLR 852
