= Condition subsequent =

In philosophical and legal contexts, a condition subsequent is a defined event which terminates a proposition or a contractual obligation. In contrast to a condition precedent, a condition subsequent brings the event (or obligation) to an end, rather than being necessary for the event or obligation to occur.

In law, a condition subsequent is an event, or state of affairs, whose occurrence is automatically construed to terminate the obligation of one party to the other. One example is that, if a man agreed to pay a barber to shave his beard, the barber then failing to do so would terminate the man's obligation to pay. An exit clause is a form of condition subsequent that can serve as a form of insurance for the party to whom it applies.

In contract law, a contract may be frustrated on the occurrence of a condition subsequent: in a contract to provide a music hall for a musical performance, the burning down of the music hall may frustrate the contract and automatically bring it to an end. Taylor v Caldwell 3 B. & S. 826, 122 Eng. Rep. 309 (1863) In a loan agreement, a condition subsequent is one which the borrower is required to satisfy within a set time period following their acquisition of the funds. Failure to do so typically triggers a default. Conditions subsequent can be explicitly stated in the language of a contract, or implied by the nature of an agreement. Implicit conditions subsequent often apply in the case of retail transactions, like point of sale purchases.

In property law, a condition subsequent is an event which terminates a party's interest in a property. When land rights are subject to a condition subsequent, this creates a defeasible fee called a fee simple subject to condition subsequent.

In such a fee, the future interest is called a "right of reentry" or "right of entry." There, the fee simple subject to condition subsequent does not end automatically upon the happening of the condition, but if the specified future event occurs, the grantor has a right to retake his property (as opposed to it reverting to him automatically). Again, the right of entry is not automatic, but rather must be exercised to terminate the fee simple subject to condition subsequent. To exercise right of entry, the holder must take substantial steps to recover possession and title, for example, by filing a lawsuit.

One of the formulations used to create a fee simple subject to condition subsequent and a right of entry is "to A, but if A sells alcohol on the land, then grantor has the right of reentry."

Common uses include language such as "may", "but if", "however", or "provided that..."

Some examples of conditions subsequent often requested by parties to a contract include bankruptcy, divorce, or relocation to a different area; a contract with such conditions will free that party from obligation to carry out its terms if some unforeseen event causes the situation to change dramatically. Generally, the defendant has the burden of proof to demonstrate that conditions subsequent were met.

== Compared to condition precedent ==
In comparison, a condition subsequent brings a duty to an end, whereas a condition precedent initiates a duty.

== See also ==
- Condition precedent
- Necessary condition
- Sufficient condition
