= New South Wales Coal Compensation Board =

Former government body in New South Wales, Australia

The New South Wales Coal Compensation Board was a government body in New South Wales which had responsibility for determining compensation payable when coal in the state was compulsorily acquired in 1981.

== Background ==
In 1981 the New South Wales Government passed legislation which vested all unmined coal to the crown. The effect of the Coal Acquisition Act 1981 (NSW) was that the government became the owner of all unmined coal in the state. This enabled the government to tax the mining of coal, a situation it was not allowed to do when coal was privately owned.

According to the board’s annual report, the net benefit to the State from the acquisition of private coal is estimated at $10 billion after taking into account compensation payments totalling $682 million.

The board and the New South Wales Coal Compensation Review Tribunal were established in 1985 to address concerns by former coal owners through the introduction of the act. Both bodies are the result of recommendations of the Coal Compensation Taskforce Report.

== Constitution ==
The board was established under the Coal Acquisition (Compensation) Arrangements 1985 (NSW). Those arrangements are made by the Governor of New South Wales under the Coal Acquisition Act 1981 (NSW), a law which entitles the governor to determine what compensation should be payable for the acquisition of coal in 1981.

The governor may appoint five part-time members to the board. This is on the recommendation of the minister responsible for mineral resources. One member has to be an employee of the Department of Mines.

The governor may appoint one of the members to be the chairperson of the board.

== Jurisdiction ==
The board has jurisdiction to determine whether compensation is payable as a result of the compulsory acquisition of coal. It may also determine the amount of compensation payable as a result of that acquisition.

The board also has jurisdiction to determine whether there should be restitution of coal owner to a private owner, and it may also deal with the voluntary acquisi5ion of coal titles.

According to the board’s Annual Report, it received compensation claims between July 1985 and March 1986, and between December 1993 and July 1994 totaling some 28,261 claims.

The New South Wales government flagged that it wished for all compensation claims to be determined by March 2007.

== Appeals ==
A person unhappy with the decision of the board may appeal to the New South Wales Coal Compensation Tribunal.

In certain cases, prerogative relief may be available from the Supreme Court of New South Wales. See for example NSW Coal Compensation Board v Nardell Colliery Pty Ltd [2004] NSWCA 35.

== Chairperson ==
The final chairperson was Mr Alastair Fotheringham, who was appointed on 1 November 1999 and reappointed on 29 October 2003.
