= Land patent =

Land grant made by a sovereign entity

A land patent is a form of letters patent assigning official ownership of a particular tract of land that has gone through various legally-prescribed processes like surveying and documentation, followed by the letter's signing, sealing, and publishing in public records, made by a sovereign entity. While land patents are still issued by governments to indicate property is privately held, they are also often used by sovereign citizens and similar groups in illegitimate attempts to gain unlawful possession of property, or avoid taxes and foreclosure.

Land patents are the right, title, and interest to a defined area. It is usually granted by a central, federal, or state government to an individual, partnership, trust, or private company. The land patent is not to be confused with a land grant. Patented lands may be lands that had been granted by a sovereign authority in return for services rendered or accompanying a title or otherwise bestowed gratis, or they may be lands privately purchased by a government, individual, or legal entity from their prior owners. "Patent" is both a process and a term. As a process, it is somewhat parallel to gaining a patent for intellectual property, including the steps of uniquely defining the property at issue, filing, processing, and granting. Unlike intellectual property patents, which have time limits, a land patent is permanent.

A land patent, known in law as "letters patent," typically issues to the original grantee and their heirs and assigns in perpetuity. The patent serves as the supreme title to the land, as it confirms that all evidence of title existing before its issuance date has been reviewed by the sovereign authority under which it was sealed and is therefore irrefutable. Consequently, the land patent legally becomes the title to the land described within its boundaries. While the irrefutability of counter-claims is relative in practice, the granting of a patent establishes the permanence of title.

== United States ==
=== Colonial era ===
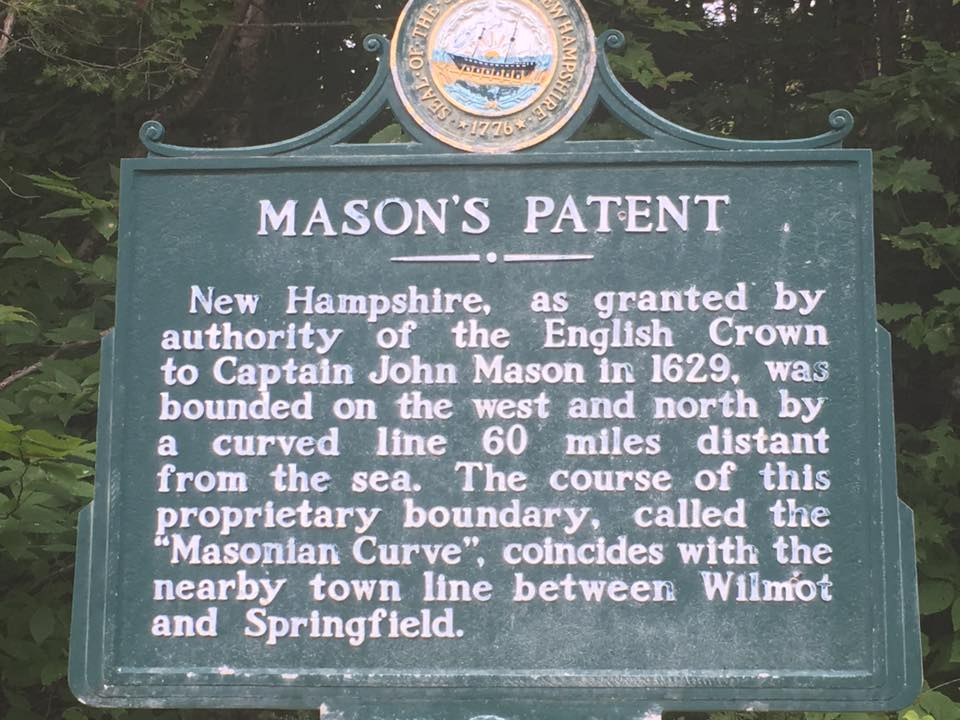
A New Hampshire historical marker commemorating a land patent from the English Crown to Captain John Mason.

In the United States, all claims of land ownership can be traced back to a land patent, first-title deed, or similar document regarding land previously owned by France, Spain, the United Kingdom, Mexico, the Kingdom of Hawaii, Russia, or Native Americans. Other terms for the certificate that grants such rights include "first-title deed" and '"final certificate."

Land in the United States of America was acquired by claim, seizure, annexation, purchase, treaty, or war from France, Great Britain, the Kingdom of Hawaii, Mexico, Russia, Spain, and the Native American peoples.

As England began to colonize America, the Crown made large grants of territory to individuals and companies. In turn, the companies and colonial governors later made smaller grants of land based on actual surveys of the land. Therefore, in colonial America along Atlantic seaboard, a link was established between surveying a land tract and its "patenting" as private property. Numerous other land patents were granted by the Crown for lands purchased by private individuals from Native American tribes.

Many original colonies' land patents came from the respective controlling country, such as England. Most of these patents were granted permanently and remain in effect to this day. The US government upholds these patents through treaty law, and like all land patents, they are immutable and cannot be altered.

Many early land patents granted by Native peoples were disputed, sometimes leading to legal challenges, due to differing interpretations of "private property" and "ownership" between these groups. Indigenous Americans typically viewed land and its resources as communal property, supported by oral traditions. In contrast, individuals from Western Europe held more defined and limited perspectives on property, its transfer, and its resolution within a system governed by written laws, Crown authority, officials, courts, and permanent documentation.

=== Land Ordinance of 1785 ===
After the American Revolution and the ratification of the US Constitution, the US Treasury Department was placed in charge of managing all public lands. In 1812, the United States General Land Office was created to assume that duty.

In accordance with specific Acts of Congress and authorized by the US President, the General Land Office issued over 2 million land grants known as land patents. These patents transferred the title of particular parcels of public land from the nation to private entities, such as individuals or private companies. Some of the granted land had associated survey or other expenses. Patentees could pay these fees in cash, homestead a claim, or acquire ownership through various donation acts passed by Congress to transfer public lands to private hands. Regardless of the method, the General Land Office adhered to a two-step process when granting a patent.

Initially, the private claimant visited the land office in the land district where the public land was situated. The claimant completed entry papers to designate the public land, and the land office register verified the availability of the claimed land by checking the local registrar records. The receiver collected the claimant's payment, as even homesteaders were required to pay administrative fees.

Subsequently, the district land office register and receiver forwarded the documentation to the General Land Office in Washington. This office conducted a thorough review to ensure the accuracy of the claim, the land's availability, and the payment method. Ultimately, the General Land Office issued a land patent for the public land in question and forwarded it to the President for his signature.

The first US land patent was issued on March 4, 1788, to John Martin. That patent reserves to the United States one third of all gold, silver, lead and copper within the claimed land.

A land patent for a 39.44-acre (15.96 ha) land parcel in present-day Monroe County, Ohio, and within the Seven Ranges land tract. The parcel was sold by the Marietta Land Office in Marietta, Ohio, in 1834.

The land patent specifies any usage restrictions, such as oil and mineral rights, roadways, ditches, and canals, that apply to the land. These restrictions are separate from state and local statutory regulations concerning property associated with the land, including zoning laws, building codes, and property taxes that pertain to both the land and any structures on it.

Private property rights associated with land patents can be further negotiated based on the terms of private contracts. These rights, inherent in patented land, pass from one heir to another, from an heir to an assignee, or from an assignee to another assignee, and are immutable except through private agreements like a warranty deed or quitclaim deed. The legal framework governing a specific parcel of patented land is typically dictated by the Congressional Act or treaty through which it was obtained, or by the terms outlined in the patent itself. For instance, US laws governing the land may be influenced by acts like the Homestead Act or reservations specified in the patent. Similarly, the Treaty of Guadalupe Hidalgo Hidalgo dictates jurisdictional provisions concerning extensive land areas in California and neighboring regions.

Entities other than natural persons, such as trusts and corporations, are not eligible to acquire land patents unless specifically authorized by an act of the US Congress. One instance of Congress granting land through patents to corporate entities is exemplified by the railroad grants issued under the Pacific Railroad Acts. These grants were provided to compensate railroad companies for constructing a transcontinental railroad spanning across America.

=== Enabling Act ===
When a territory agreed to enter the United States, an Enabling Act was agreed to as a condition precedent of statehood. The Enabling Act requires that all unappropriated lands, which are not yet privately owned, to be forever disclaimed by the territory and the people of the territory and the title to ceded to the United States for its disposition. For example, the enabling act of the Washington Territory declares in part:

...that the people inhabiting said proposed States do agree and declare that they forever disclaim all right and title to the unappropriated public lands lying within the boundaries thereof, and to all lands lying within said limits owned or held by any Indian or Indian tribes; and that until the title thereto shall have been extinguished by the United States, the same shall be and remain subject to the disposition of the United States. ..

Once the people of the territory disclaimed their right and title to the land, the United States held it in trust until an individual established a claim, often by enhancing the homestead parcel over a specific period. Upon the submission of a valid claim, the United States General Land Office (now the Bureau of Land Management) verifies that the claimant has covered the survey expenses and made an additional deposit. Lastly, pursuant to the various land acts of Congress, the land is granted to the private owner by letters patent under the signature and seal of the US President.
