= Conditional fee =

Conditional fee may refer to:

- In United States law, a reference to a future interest in real property; here fee is derived from fief, meaning a feudal landholding
- In English law, a contingent fee payable to a lawyer, also known as "no win no fee"
