= Allhusen v Whittell =

- Court: Chancery Division
- Decided: 28 June 1867
- Citations: (1867) LR 4 Eq 295 [1861-1873] All ER 149; 36 LJ Ch 929; 16 LT 695

Court membership
- Judge sitting: Page Wood VC

Keywords
- Trusts, life tenant, remainderman

Allhusen v Whitell (1867) LR 4 Eq 295 is an English trusts law case which lays down a rule of equity which requires the trustee of a trust to strike a fair balance between the beneficiaries who are tenants for life and those who are remaindermen in respect of payment of the debts of an estate. The life tenant under a will is entitled to income earned after the testator's death, but it often takes some time to ascertain and settle all of those debts. In the meantime the assets of the estate are earning income for tenant for life, whereas the life tenant should only receive income from the estate net of the debts; the rule in Allhusen v White requires the life tenant to make a contribution.

== Judgment ==
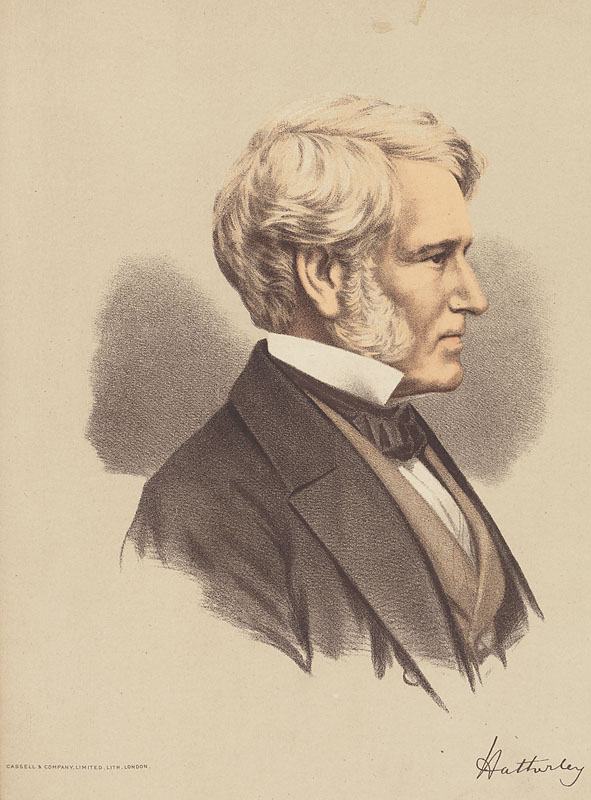
Page-Wood VC.

The judgment of the Court was given by the Vice Chancellor, Sir William Page Wood.

== The rule ==
The rule was summarised by Romer LJ in Corbett v Commissioners of Inland Revenue [1938] 1 KB 567 as follows:

For the purposes of adjusting rights as between the tenant for life and the remainderman of a residuary estate, debts, legacies, estate duties, probate duties and so forth, are to be deemed to have been paid out of such capital as the testator's estate as will be sufficient for that purpose, when to that capital is added interest on that capital from the date of the testator's death to the date of payment of the legacy or debt, or whatever it may have been interest, interest being calculated at the average rate of interest earned by the testator's estate during the relevant period.

The rule may be excluded by an expression of contrary intent, or where its application would not be appropriate.

The rule has been described as "complex, fiddlesome and resulting in a disproportionate amount of work and expense" and the rule is often either excluded under a well drafted will, or simply ignored.

The Law Commission of England & Wales has consulted on the rule's abolition.
