= Exception in deed =

In property law, the phrase exception in deed refers to a statement in a deed of real estate which reserves certain rights to the transferor (for example, easements, mineral rights, or a life estate).
