= Doctrine of worthier title =

In the common law of England, the doctrine of worthier title was a legal doctrine that preferred taking title to real estate by descent over taking title by devise or by purchase. It essentially provides that a remainder cannot be created in the grantor's heirs, at least not by those words.

The rule provided that where a testator undertook to convey to an heir the same estate in land that the heir would take under the laws of inheritance, the heir would be adjudged to have taken title to the land by inheritance rather than by the conveyance, because descent through the bloodline was held to be "worthier" than a conveyance through a legal instrument.

== History ==
The doctrine of worthier title, like the Rule in Shelley's Case, had its origin in attempts by royal courts to defeat various devices contrived by lawyers during the era of feudalism to retain lands in their families while avoiding feudal duties, and to secure its free alienability. The creation of family settlements designed to preserve land within the family, transfer it without feudal duties due to the lords of the fee upon transfer at death, and preserve it from claims of creditors, occupied the ingenuity of many common lawyers during the late Middle Ages. So did efforts to undo the restrictions placed by ancestors once they became inconvenient. These concerns underlie the explanation given in Coke on Littleton:

But if a man makes a gift in tail, or a lease of life, the remainder to his right heirs, this remainder is void, and he hath the revision in him; for the ancestor during his life beareth in his body in judgment of law all his heirs, and therefore it is truly said that haeres est pars antecessoris. ("the heir is a part of the ancestor") And this appeareth in a common case, that if land be given to a man and his heirs, all his heirs are so totally in him as he may give the land to whom he will.

The law deemed that since no one is an "heir" until the person he or she inherits from dies, an attempt to create a remainder interest in the heir created no present interest at all. This interpretation draws strength by analogy from the common words of a conveyance in fee simple, "to N. and his heirs." This conveyance creates no present interest in any heir; why should a remainder do the same?

== Importance ==
If the heir receives the same interest in the property that he would have received either way, the doctrine of worthier title would appear at first impression to be a distinction without a difference.

=== Divesting heirs of interests under instruments ===
The rule makes a difference when property owners make inter vivos gifts of less than fee simple interests. Suppose Adam owns title to lands, is married to Beulah, and executes a deed "to Beulah for life, and then to Adam's heirs", Caleb and Dinah. Adam's intent in these words of conveyance would appear to be to grant Beulah a life estate, and then create a vested remainder interest in his apparent heirs Caleb and Dinah. The remainder interest is vested because Beulah is mortal; her death is certain to happen. But, since Caleb and Dinah are already Adam's apparent heirs, their interest under the laws of descent is "worthier" than the interest they take under the instrument, and the deed is construed as if Adam had stopped with "to Beulah for life." A reversion is created in the grantor (Adam), so if Beulah dies before Adam, the property will return to him. This doctrine is further complicated by the fact that although Caleb and Dinah are Adam's heirs apparent, it is legally impossible to determine who is an heir until the death of the grantor.

The remainder interest Caleb and Dinah were meant to have in the land subject to Beulah's life estate would have been a vested interest as the conveyance was written, but that vested interest is wiped out by the doctrine of worthier title. Imagine then that Adam then falls on hard times, and his creditors take judgments against him. If the deed were given effect as written, Caleb and Dinah's vested rights to the remainder interest would have existed prior to any judgment liens, and would therefore be prior in right to the claims of Adam's creditors. The doctrine of worthier title, preferring title by intestate succession over title by the instrument, wipes out that vested interest and prefers the rights of Adam's creditors over the rights of Adam's heirs. This illustrates that although the doctrine of worthier title, by its terms, does not affect the right passed from the ancestor to the heir, it can operate to cut off rights of the heirs against third parties.

=== Designation of heirs ===
The doctrine of worthier title can also affect estates created by will, when those estates are in people who would not take by intestate succession. Suppose once more that Adam is a testator; Adam's good friends in life were Edward and Fran, and Adam's surviving child is Dinah. Under applicable state laws of intestate succession, Dinah would be Adam's heir if Adam had no will.

But Adam does have a will: It firstly leaves his land "to Edward for life, then to Adam's heirs", and it also contains a residuary clause that leaves the remainder of Adam's estate to Fran. By the operation of the instrument, Edward would have a life estate in the land, while Fran would inherit the rest of the estate immediately; then "Adam's heirs" – i.e., Dinah – would have a vested remainder interest in the land, and expect to inherit it upon Edward's death. The doctrine of worthier title intervenes, however, with unexpected results. The doctrine prefers the interest "Adam's heirs" would have taken to the interest created by an instrument. Here, however, Adam's will designates Fran as his heir at law. Instead of a life estate in Edward, followed by a vested remainder in Dinah, the doctrine of worthier title operates to disinherit Dinah completely, treats the interest of the heirs as a mere reversion, and upon Edward's death gives the land, as well, to Fran.

== Obsolescence ==
The doctrine of worthier title can be avoided by naming specific people, or classes of people (e.g. "my children"), instead of using the phrase "my heirs." As such, the doctrine of worthier title seldom comes into play. The doctrine has also been abolished, either by statute or by judicial decisions, in many common law jurisdictions. In some jurisdictions, the rule survives, but only as a presumption or a rule of construction, that can be rebutted by evidence that the grantor meant otherwise.
