= Open mines doctrine =

The open mines doctrine is a term of real property. Under the open mines doctrine, depletion of natural resources constitutes waste unless consumption of such resources constitutes normal use of the land, as in the case of a life estate in coal mine or a granite quarry.

The life tenant cannot open the land to search for minerals and other natural resources, but if the quarries or mines were open before the tenant took the life estate, then it is not waste for the life tenant to continue their use. Where the life tenant opens the land for new mines (i.e., voluntary waste) a remainderman can enjoin such.

The sale of harvestable crops does not constitute waste, inasmuch as they can be regrown and are thus generally not considered “natural resources”.

== See also ==
- Law of waste
