= Words of purchase =

In English law, words of purchase are words the grantor uses to designate the grantee on a deed, will, or probate that determine who is to receive the interest. The term "words of purchase" is a technical conveyancing expression, a term of art in real property law that has nothing to do with the ordinary meanings of the word "purchase". The word purchase in the expression means that real property is being transferred by deed or will, not inherited through the laws of descent and distribution.

Whether the property is bought or given away, if the transfer is by deed or will, it is a purchase in this usage. The act or process of acquiring real property by deed or will is called taking by purchase, even though it was a gift. The person who acquires real property by deed or will is called a purchaser even if this person may have paid nothing.

Words of purchase are contrasted with words of limitation, which describe the extent, or quality, or duration of the estate he acquires. For example, in a deed to Whiteacre "to A for life", "to A" are words of purchase, "for life" words of limitation.

A historical reference to the term can be found in a 1765 treatise of William Blackstone: "WHAT we call purchase, perquisitio, the feudists call conquest, conquaestus, or conquisitio: both denoting any means of acquiring an estate out of the common course of inheritance."

== See also ==
- Rule in Shelley's Case
