= New South Wales Coal Compensation Review Tribunal =

The New South Wales Coal Compensation Review Tribunal was a tribunal in New South Wales, a state of Australia, which had responsibility for determining appeals about compensation payable when coal in the state was compulsorily acquired during 1981. The tribunal was in operation between 1985 and 1 January 2008.

== Background ==
In 1981 the New South Wales Government passed legislation which vested all unmined coal to the crown. The effect of Coal Acquisition Act 1981 (NSW) was that the government became the owner of all unmined coal in the state. Vesting of the ownership of the coal enabled the government to tax the mining of coal, a situation it was not allowed to do when coal was privately owned. According to the New South Wales Coal Compensation Board’s annual report, the net benefit to the State from the acquisition of private coal is estimated at around $10 billion after taking into account compensation payments totalling $682 million

The board and the tribunal were established in 1985 to address concerns by former coal owners through the introduction of the Act. Both bodies were the result of recommendations of the Coal Compensation Taskforce Report.

== Constitution ==
The tribunal was established under the Coal Acquisition (Compensation) Arrangements 1985 (NSW). Those arrangements were made by the Governor of New South Wales under the Coal Acquisition Act 1981 (NSW), a law which entitles the governor to determine what compensation should be payable for the acquisition of coal in 1981. The tribunal consisted of six members appointed by the Governor. Two of those members were lawyers nominated by the Attorney General of New South Wales. The remaining four members were nominated by the Minister for Mineral Resources and were generally persons who have expertise in the coal industry.

The Governor may appoint one of the lawyer members as the chairperson and the other as deputy chairperson. There was also provision for the Governor to appoint alternates for the members.

== Jurisdiction ==
The tribunal had jurisdiction to decide whether the compensation determined as payable by the board as a result of the compulsory acquisition of coal is correct. It may also determine the amount of compensation payable as a result of that acquisition. The tribunal sat as a three-member panel with either the chairperson or deputy presiding.

The chairperson immediately prior to the Tribunal's abolition was Mr G. R. Leader.

== Caseload ==
According to the tribunal's 2005 Annual Report, it determined 67 appeals in 2004 and had 26 outstanding. The New South Wales Government flagged that it wished for all compensation claims to be determined by March 2007 and the tribunal will cease once all those claims have been finalised.

== Appeals ==
There were no appeal rights from the decision of the tribunal. In certain cases, prerogative relief may be available from the Supreme Court of New South Wales, such as NSW Coal Compensation Board v Nardell Colliery Pty Ltd.

== Location ==
Up until its abolition in 2008, the tribunal had its office at Level 16, No. 1 Castlereagh Street, Sydney.

== See also ==
- List of New South Wales courts and tribunals
