= Vesting =

When a person gains legal rights arising from ownership of a property

In law, vesting is the point in time when the rights and interests arising from legal ownership of a property are acquired by some person. Vesting creates an immediately secured right of present or future deployment. One has a vested right to an asset that cannot be taken away by any third party, even though one may not yet possess the asset. When the right, interest, or title to the present or future possession of a legal estate can be transferred to any other party, it is termed a vested interest.

The concept can arise in any number of contexts, but the most common are inheritance law and retirement plan law. In real estate, to vest is to create an entitlement to a privilege or a right. For example, one may cross someone else's property regularly and unrestrictedly for several years, and one's right to an easement becomes vested. The original owner still retains the possession, but can no longer prevent the other party from crossing.

== Inheritance ==
Some bequests do not vest immediately upon death of the testator. For example, many wills specify that an heir who dies within a set period (such as 60 days) is not to inherit, and further specify how the corresponding share is to be distributed. This is generally done to obviate disputes over the precise time of death, and to avoid paying taxes twice in rapid succession should multiple members of a family die in the wake of a disaster. Such a bequest does not vest until the expiration of the specified period, because the actual heir cannot be determined with certainty.

It is also possible to give a person, A, a life interest in a property, with the remainder to go to another person or persons, B. If the beneficiary of the remainder cannot yet be known, then the remainder is said not to have vested, and the remainder is said to be contingent. This may happen with entailed estates, or when property is left in trust to care for a child or relative without heirs. (See trust law for details).

== Employment ==
=== Retirement plans ===
Vesting is an issue in conjunction with employer contributions to an employee stock option plan, deferred compensation plan, or to a retirement plan such as a 401(k), annuity or pension plan.

Once a retirement plan is fully vested, the employee has an absolute right to the entire amount of money in the account. It is a "basic right that has been granted, or has accrued, and cannot be taken away"; for example. one has a right to a vested pension.

Generally, the portion vested cannot be reclaimed by the employer, nor can it be used to satisfy the employer's debts. Any portion not vested may be forfeited under certain conditions, such as termination of employment. The portion invested is often determined pro-rata.

Generally, for retirement plans in the United States, employees are fully vested in their own salary deferral contributions upon inception. For employer contributions, however, such as those from an employer matching program, the employer has limited options under the Employee Retirement Income Security Act (ERISA) to delay the vesting of their contributions to the employee. For example, the employer can say that the employee must work with the company for three years or they lose any employer contributed money, which is known as cliff vesting. Or it can choose to have the 20% of the contributions vest each year over five years, known as graduated vesting or graded vesting.

Choosing a vesting schedule allows an employer to selectively reward employees who remain employed for a period of time. In theory, this allows the employer to make greater contributions than would otherwise be prudent, because the money they contribute on behalf of employees goes to the ones they most want to reward.

=== Ownership in startup companies ===
Small entrepreneurial companies (startups) usually offer grants of common stock or positions in an employee stock option plan to employees and other key participants such as contractors, board members, advisors and major vendors. To make the reward commensurate with the extent of contribution, encourage loyalty, and avoid spreading ownership widely among former participants, these grants are usually subject to vesting arrangements.

Vesting of options is straightforward. The grantee receives an option to purchase a block of common stock, typically on commencement of employment, which vests over time. The option may be exercised at any time but only with respect to the vested portion. The entire option is lost if not exercised within a short period after the end of the employer relationship. The vesting operates simply by changing the status of the option over time from fully unexercisable to fully exercisable according to the vesting schedule.

Common stock grants are similar in function but the mechanism is different. An employee, typically a company founder, purchases stock in the company at nominal price shortly after the company is formed. The company retains a repurchase right to buy the stock back at the same price should the employee leave. The repurchase right diminishes over time so that the company eventually has no right to repurchase the stock (in other words, the stock becomes fully vested).

Beginning in the 1990s, vesting periods in the United States are usually 3–5 years for employees, but shorter for board members and others whose expected tenure at a company is shorter. The vesting schedule is most often a pro-rata monthly vesting over the period with a six or twelve month cliff. Alternative vesting models are becoming more popular including milestone-based vesting and dynamic equity vesting.

In the case of both stock and options, large initial grants that vest over time are more common than periodic smaller grants because they are easier to account for and administer, they establish the arrangement up-front and are thus more predictable, and (subject to some complexities and limitations) the value of the grants and holding period requirements for tax purposes are set upon the initial grant date, giving a considerable tax advantage to the employee.

=== Profit sharing plans ===
Profit-sharing plans are usually vested in ten years, although in some cases a plan may serve essentially as a pension by allowing a limited amount of vesting should the employee retire or leave on good terms after an extended period of employment.

=== As a component of salary ===
Many large companies grant stock or stock options in the form of restricted stock units to employees as part of their compensation. These grants are spread out over time. For example, new employees at Amazon receive a stock grant that vests on a back-loaded schedule of 5% in the first year, 15% in the second, and 40% in each of the last two years.

== Vested rights doctrine in zoning law ==
The vested rights doctrine is the rule of zoning law by which an owner or developer is entitled to proceed in accordance with the prior zoning provision where there has been a substantial change of position, expenditures, or incurrence of obligations made in good faith by an innocent party under a building permit or in reliance upon the probability of its issuance.

== Vesting arrangements and terminology ==
A "vesting period" is a period of time an investor or other person holding a right to something must wait until they are capable of fully exercising their rights and until those rights may not be taken away.

In many cases vesting does not occur all at once. Specific portions of the rights grant vest on different dates over the duration of the period of the vesting. When part of a right is vested and part remains unvested, it is considered "partly vested".

In cases of partial vesting, a "vesting schedule" is a table or chart showing the portion of a right that is vested over time; typically the schedule provides for equal portions to vest on periodic vesting dates, usually once per day, month, quarter, or year, in stairstep fashion over the course of the vesting period. Often there is a cliff by which the first few steps in the graph are missing, so that there is no vesting at all for a period (usually six or twelve months in the case of employee equity), after which there is a cliff date upon which a large amount of vesting occurs all at once.

Some arrangements provide for "accelerated vesting", by which all or a major portion of the unvested right vests all at once upon the occurrence of a specified event. The two main forms are single-trigger and double-trigger acceleration. Single-trigger vests unvested shares upon one event, typically an acquisition. Double-trigger requires two events: first an acquisition, then an involuntary termination of the employee, usually within 9-18 months of the acquisition closing. Double-trigger acceleration has become the market standard in venture-backed companies; if only the acquisition occurs the employee continues vesting normally, and acceleration applies only if both triggers are met. Less commonly, the vesting schedule may call for variable grants or subject to conditions such as reaching milestones or employee performance. "Graded vesting" or called retable vesting (vesting after each year until the employee is fully vested) may be "uniform" (e.g., 20% of the compensation vested each year for five years) or "non-uniform" (e.g., 20%, 30%, and 50% of the compensation vested each year for the next three years).

== See also ==
- Doctrine of worthier title
- Employee Retirement Income Security Act (ERISA)
- Future interest
- Pro-rata
- Remainder (law)
- Vested Property Act (Bangladesh)
