= Morgan v Fry =

United Kingdom labour case law

- Court: Court of Appeal
- Citation: [1968] 2 QB 710

Court membership
- Judges sitting: Lord Denning MR, Davies LJ and Russell LJ

Keywords
- Right to strike, common law, fundamental right

Morgan v Fry [1968] 2 QB 710 is a UK labour law case, concerning the right to strike at common law.

It is notable as Lord Denning MR said the following:

It has been held for over 60 years that workmen have a right to strike... provided that they give sufficient notice beforehand...

== Facts ==
The Port of London Authority negotiated with a single union. Morgan, a lockman, was a member of a breakaway union. The first union threatened to strike unless the breakaway union members were dismissed, Fry arguing it was a genuine threat to industrial peace. He did not intend for anyone to be dismissed in particular. Morgan was dismissed because of the threat, and sued for intimidation and conspiracy.

== Judgment ==
Lord Denning MR held that if proper notice, the length of time to terminate a contract, was given then a strike was lawful, and because the strike was lawful there was no tort of intimidation. The defendants’ honest belief they were acting in the interests of the union negatived any allegation of conspiracy.

Lord Denning MR said the following.

This brings me, therefore, to the crux of the case: was the "strike notice" in this case the threat of a breach of contract? If it had been a full week's notice by the men to terminate the employment altogether, it would not have been a threat to commit a breach of contract. Every man was entitled to terminate his contract of employment by giving a week's notice. But the "strike notice "in this case was not a notice to terminate the employment. It was a notice that they would not work with non-unionists. That looks very like a threat of a breach of contract: and, therefore, intimidation. In Stratford (J. T.) & Son Ltd. v. Lindley I stated the argument in this way:

"Suppose that a trade-union officer gives a 'strike notice.' He says to an employer: 'We are going to call a strike on Monday week unless you ... dismiss yonder man who is not a member of the union.'... Such a notice is not to be construed as if it were a week's notice on behalf of the men to terminate their employment, for that is the last thing any of the men would desire. They do not want to lose their pension rights and so forth by giving up their jobs. The 'strike notice' is nothing more nor less than a notice that the men will not come to work" - or, as in this case, that they will not do their work as they should - "In short, that they will break their contracts. ... In these circumstances ... the trade-union officer, by giving the 'strike notice,' issues a threat to the employer. He threatens to induce the men to break their contracts of employment unless the employer complies with their demand. That is a threat to commit a tort. It is clear intimidation...."

It is difficult to see the logical flaw in that argument. But there must be something wrong with it: for if that argument were correct, it would do away with the right to strike in this country. It has been held for over 60 years that workmen have a right to strike (including therein a right to say that they will not work with non-unionists) provided that they give sufficient notice beforehand: and a notice is sufficient if it is at least as long as the notice required to terminate the contract.

Davies LJ, agreeing with Lord Denning MR, said the following:

It is indeed a startling proposition that, in these days of collective bargaining, a concerted withdrawal of labour, or the threat of such, provided always that a proper period of notice is given, can be held to be illegal. As the Master of the Rolls has said, it is not altogether easy to see the logical reason in law why, if the men tell the employers that, if the latter do not terminate the employment of X, they (the men) will not work according to the terms and conditions of their existing contracts, that does not amount to a breach or to a declaration of intention to breach their contracts. This point was dealt with by my Lord in Stratford (J. T) & Son Ltd. v. Lindley in the passage which he has quoted in his judgment in the present case. But it seems to me that it may well be that the proper analysis of such a situation as that in the present case is that the men, or the union on their behalf, in effect are saying: "As from the appropriate date we are not prepared to go on working on the present terms, that is to say, alongside the non-union men. If you get rid of them, then all will be well; if not, then we shall not work." It is to be noted that the notice here stated that the men were "to carry out their duties as far as possible without the assistance of such people." The meaning of this obviously was that if the non-unionists were not there the men would work but that if the non-unionists were there the men would not work. In a sense this does amount to a termination of the existing contract and an offer to continue on different terms. In the present case this was accepted by the Port of London Authority who, as I have said, did not break their contract with the plaintiff but terminated it by lawful notice. This conception does not, in my view, conflict with the observations made by Lord Donovan in Stratford v. Lindley on the particular facts of that case.

Whether or not the approach above suggested be correct, there is abundant authority for the proposition that it is not unlawful for workmen to inform their employers that they will not work with a particular man or set of men. My Lord has referred to the judgment of Lord Sterndale M.R. in White v. Riley and I would venture to add another citation from that judgment:

"... if a set of men object to work with another man or another set of men they have a perfect right to say that they will not work with him any longer, and, more than that they have a perfect right to tell their employer what they are going to do. It is sometimes expressed by saying that they have a right to give him a warning but they have not a right to threaten. Of course both of those words are difficult to define, and I prefer to say that they have a right to make the statement to him that they are going to do it, and that whatever epithet or substantive you may apply to it, if they do not go beyond that there is no cause of action."

That statement of principle, aptly illustrated as it is by the two converse Irish cases to which my Lord has referred has never been doubted. and in connection with those two cases it should be pointed out that the result of the plaintiff's argument here would be that there is no difference in point of legality between on the one hand a strike notice of proper length and on the other hand a lightning strike upon no or no adequate notice.

Many other statements to the same effect as that enunciated in White v. Riley110 are to be found in the authorities. There is the clear statement to that effect by Fletcher-Moulton L.J. in Gozney v. Bristol Trade and Provident Society. And, of course, Lord Reid in Rookes v. Barnard said:

"... there is no doubt that men are entitled to threaten to strike if that involves no breach of their contracts with their employer and they are not trying to induce their employer to break any contract with the plaintiff."

It is true that neither of those passages is expressly directed to the suggested distinction between a proper notice of complete termination and a proper notice of intention to withdraw labour or not to work in accordance with the terms of the existing contracts. But in fact no support for such a distinction is to be found in the decided cases.

In the course of the argument reference was made by both sides to paras. 6 and 7 of Sch. 1 to the Contracts of Employment Act 1963, and to the definition of "strike" in para. 11. It may well be that these paragraphs do not assist as to the position at common law or to the decision of the present case. But it is nevertheless clear that the legislature were contemplating that in certain circumstances a contract of employment should be deemed to continue even though the employee was on strike.

Rookes v. Barnard does not, in my judgment, decide that the employees or the union on their behalf may not by a proper period of notice give notice of withdrawal of labour or of an intention not to be bound by the existing contractual conditions. I agree with Mr. Stocker's submission that that case really turned upon the fact that it was admitted there that the "no-strike" clause was incorporated into each individual contract of service; consequently a strike or a threat to strike was clearly illegal, a flagrant violation, as Lord Devlin termed it, of a pledge not to strike. There was also, of course, in that case the fact that the notice given was of three days only, instead of the necessary minimum of seven days. This was referred to by Lord Devlin as a technical illegality. One does not, of course, know whether, had there been no "no-strike" clause, the result of the case would have been the same. But in the present case there is no such technical illegality, since the notice given was of the proper length.

It will be seen, therefore, that on this, the main part of the case, I am in respectful agreement with the judgment of the Master of the Rolls. The notice given by Mr. Fry was not an illegal notice nor did it amount to a threat of illegal action. It was a statement that in default of action by the Port of London Authority which it might lawfully take the men would withdraw their labour, which in effect I suppose would mean that the obligations under the contract would be mutually suspended.

In the result, therefore, I agree that the judge ought to have found in favour of the defendants and the action should have been dismissed.

Russell LJ dissented in reasoning:

On the more general question of a "right to strike" I would not go so far as to say that a strike notice, provided the length is not less than that required to determine the contracts, cannot involve a breach of those contracts, even when the true view is that it is intended while not determining the contract not to comply with the terms or some of the terms of it during its continuance. I have already mentioned White v. Riley as a case of termination of the contract. Allen v. Flood was, I think, another such.

== See also ==
- United Kingdom labour law
