= Remainder (law) =

In property law, a future interest created in a transferee

In property law of the United Kingdom and the United States and other common law countries, a remainder is a future interest given to a person (who is referred to as the transferee or remainderman) that is capable of becoming possessory upon the natural end of a prior estate created by the same instrument. Thus, the prior estate must be one that is capable of ending naturally, for example upon the expiration of a term of years or the death of a life tenant. A future interest following a fee simple absolute cannot be a remainder because of the preceding infinite duration.

For example:

A person, A, conveys (gives) a piece of real property called "Blackacre" "to B for life, and then to C and her heirs".
- B receives a life estate in Blackacre.
- C holds a remainder, which can become possessory when the prior estate naturally terminates (B's death). However, C cannot claim the property during B's lifetime.

There are two types of remainders in property law: vested and contingent. A vested remainder is held by a specific person without any conditions ("conditions precedent"); a contingent remainder is one for which the holder has not been identified, or for which a condition precedent must be satisfied.

== Vested remainder ==
A remainder is vested if both

1. The remainder is given to a presently existing and ascertained person.
2. It is not subject to a "condition precedent".

There are three types of vested remainders:

- indefeasibly vested
- vested subject to open
- vested subject to divestment.

=== Indefeasibly vested ===
An indefeasibly vested remainder is certain to become possessory in the future, and cannot be divested.

For example
A conveys to "B for life, then to C and C's heirs."

C has an indefeasibly vested remainder, certain to become possessory upon termination of B's life estate (when B dies). C or C's heirs will clearly be entitled to possession upon B’s death.

=== Subject to open ===
Vested remainders subject to open are rare.

The most common example is
"A conveys Blackacre to B for life, remainder to the children of C in fee simple, and C has two children D and E".

Both D and E are ascertainable people, but both might die before C, so the vested remainder is not certain to become possessory and thus the remainder is defeasible.

The most important distinction between vested remainders subject to open and indefeasibly vested remainders are that vested subject to open remainders can be subject to language in the conveyance which can enlarge the class of persons which have a future interest in the property. Thus, C may have more children than just D and E who will also have a future interest in Blackacre.

=== Subject to divestment ===
Vested remainders subject to divestment are remainders that may be terminated by an executory interest before becoming possessory.

For example
"A conveys Blackacre to B for life, then to C, but if C ever becomes a lawyer, then to D."

The future interest of C is not certain, thus it is "defeasible". Additionally, the interest cannot become smaller by the addition of more remainder owners, thus it is not "open". The identifying component is the possibility of being divested by D who owns an executory interest from the remainder if C becomes a lawyer.

== Contingent remainder ==
The contingent remainder is one that is surrounded in uncertainty. A remainder is contingent if one or more of the following is true: (1) it is conveyed to an unascertained or unborn person, (2) it is made contingent on anything but the natural termination of the preceding estate.

For example, if we assume that C is alive, and A conveys "to B for life, then to the heirs of C ...", then the remainder is contingent because the heirs of C cannot be ascertained until C dies. No person, while living, can actually have heirs – only "heirs apparent" or "heirs presumptive". We might also assume that C is unmarried, and A conveys "to B for life, and then to C if C marries." C's interest is a contingent remainder because C's interest depends on C's getting married.

In recent years, courts in the United States have merged contingent remainders with executory interests into one category.

== Identifying remainders ==
The key difference between a reversion and a remainder is that a reversion is held by the grantor of the original conveyance, whereas "remainder" is used to refer to an interest that would be a reversion, but is instead transferred to someone other than the grantor. Similarly to reversions, remainders are usually created in conjunction with a life estate, life estate pur autre vie, or fee tail estate (or a future interest that will eventually become one of these estates).

Language note
Although the term reversion is sometimes used to refer to the interest retained by a landlord when he grants possession to a tenant, not all real estate professionals can agree on the correctness of this use of the term. Few people would refer to such a transferred interest as a remainder, so this type of "remainder" tends not to be a problem when discussing property rights.

== Examples ==
"A and her heirs, then to B"
B's estate is not a remainder since a remainder cannot follow an estate held in fee simple absolute.
"A for life, then to B"
B's estate is a vested remainder since the remainder is given to an ascertained person (B) and there are no precedent conditions (such as "if B is not married").
"A for life, then to B if B reaches 21, and if B does not reach 21 then to C and C's heirs"
B's and C's estates are both contingent remainders. While B and C are ascertained persons, the condition (reaching 21) implies alternative contingent remainders for both parties.

== Special remainder in peerages ==
In the United Kingdom it is possible for a patent creating a hereditary peerage to allow for succession by someone other than an heir-male or heir of the body; this is a "special remainder".

Several instances may be cited:

- The Barony of Nelson (to an elder brother and his heirs-male).
- The Earldom of Roberts (to a daughter and her heirs-male).
- The Barony of Amherst (to a nephew and his heirs-male).
- The Dukedom of Dover (to a younger son and his heirs-male while the eldest son is still alive).

In many cases, at the time of the grant the proposed peer in question had no sons, nor any prospect of producing any, and the special remainder was made to allow remembrance of his personal honour to continue after his death and to preclude an otherwise certain rapid extinction of the peerage. However, in all cases the course of descent specified in the patent must be known in common law.

For instance, the Crown may not make a "shifting limitation" in the letters patent; in other words, the patent may not vest the peerage in an individual and then, upon some event other than death (such as succession to a higher title), shift the title to another person. The doctrine was established in the Buckhurst Peerage Case (1876) 2 App Cas 1, in which the House of Lords deemed invalid the letters patent intended to keep the Barony of Buckhurst separate from the Earldom of De La Warr. The patent stipulated that if the holder of the barony should ever inherit the earldom, then he would be deprived of the barony, which would instead pass to the next successor as if the deprived holder had died without issue.

== See also ==
- Executory interest
- Future interest
- Rule in Shelley's Case
- Doctrine of worthier title
