= Interest in possession trust =

Form of legal trust

An interest in possession trust is a trust in which at least one beneficiary has the right to receive the income generated by the trust (if trust funds are invested) or the right to enjoy the trust assets for the present time in another way. The beneficiary with the right to enjoy the trust property for the time being is said to have an interest in possession and is colloquially described as an income beneficiary, or the life tenant.

Beneficiaries of a trust have an interest in possession if they have the immediate and automatic right to receive the income arising from the trust property as it arises, or have the use and enjoyment of it, such as by living in a property owned by the trustees. Such a beneficiary is also known as an income beneficiary or life tenant. There may be more than one income beneficiary, who may have either a joint tenancy or as tenants in common. The trustee must pass all of the income received, less any trustees' expenses, to the beneficiary/ies. For income tax purposes, the income so accruing to the income beneficiary is taxable income of the beneficiary, and taxed accordingly, unless otherwise exempted. A beneficiary who is entitled to the income of the trust for life is known as a ‘life tenant’ or as ‘having a life interest’. A beneficiary who is entitled to the trust capital is known as the ‘remainderman’ or the ‘capital beneficiary’.

A trust can give the interest in possession to a beneficiary for a fixed period, for an indefinite period or, more usually, for the rest of the beneficiary's life. Such a life interest trust is the most common example of an interest in possession trust. In the United Kingdom, the 10-yearly inheritance tax charge may be payable on assets transferred into this type of trust on or after 22 March 2006.

In the example of a life interest trust, the interest in possession ends when the income beneficiary dies. The capital of the trust will then pass to another beneficiary (or more than one). Where a charity has the right to income under a trust, it will also have an interest in possession, but this will clearly not be a life interest trust – an example would be a trust under which an art gallery has the right to display works owned by the trustees for a certain period.

Either the will or trust deed establishing the trust, or the general law, will set out how tax and trustees' expenses will be divided between the income beneficiary and the capital of the trust. Trustee investment policies will also allow emphasis on either present income (which may reduce the real value of the capital) or capital growth (increasing income in the long term and capital remaining when the interest in possession is terminated) or a balance.

Interest in possession trusts may be created as part of a will. Typically, a surviving spouse will be granted by the settlor a right to the income of the trust and/or a right to remain in the family home for the remainder of their life. When the surviving spouse dies, the rest of the fund (the remainder) may pass to the couple's children or other named persons.

== Examples ==
The Duchy of Cornwall is the legal owner of large land holdings in the United Kingdom and owns financial investments. The Duke of Cornwall has an interest in possession in the duchy's assets, meaning the duke is entitled to the income of the duchy and the enjoyment of its assets. When there is no duke (the lifetime ('inter vivos') owner), the interest in possession reverts to the pre-1337 owner, the Crown. It is then under its exceptional statutory and quasi-statutory terms revested on the future Duke of Cornwall, which means it is not subject to the rule against perpetuities.
