= Poussard v Spiers and Pond =

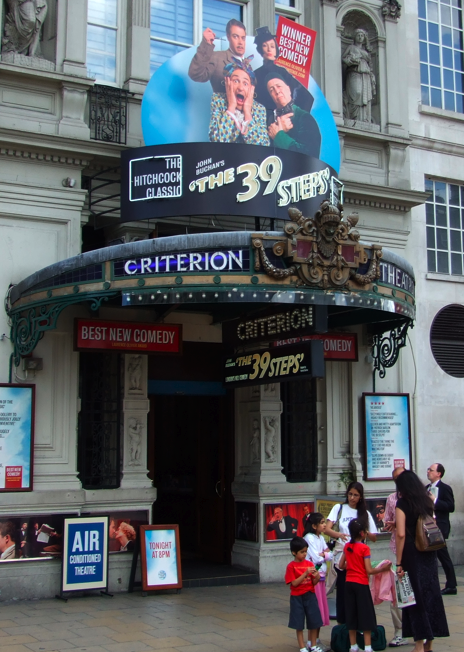
- Court: Divisional Court
- Decided: 25 April 1876
- Citation: (1876) 1 QBD 410

Court membership
- Judges sitting: Blackburn J, Quain J and Field J

Keywords
- Contract terms, classification, condition precedent, rescission

Poussard v Spiers and Pond (1876) 1 QBD 410 is an English contract law case concerning the classification of contract terms and wrongful dismissal.

== Facts ==
Madame Poussard agreed in writing to sing and play the lead role at Spiers and Pond's French opera at the Criterion Theatre for £11 a week for three months. This was on condition that the opera ran for three months and started at about 14 November. The letter of engagement read,

“Criterion Theatre, Oct. 16th, 1874.

“To Madame Poussard.

“On behalf of Messrs. Spiers & Pond I engage you to sing and play at the Criterion Theatre on the following terms:—

“You to play the part of Friquette in Lecocq's opera of Les Pres Saint Gervais, commencing on or about the fourteenth of November next, at a weekly salary of eleven pounds (£11), and to continue on at that sum for a period of three months, providing the opera shall run for that period. Then, at the expiration of the said three months, I shall be at liberty to re-engage you at my option, on terms then to be arranged, and not to exceed fourteen pounds per week for another period of three months. Dresses and tights requisite for the part to be provided by the management, and the engagement to be subject to the ordinary rules and regulations of the theatre.

“Ratified: … “E. P. Hingston, Manager.

“Spiers & Pond.

“Madame Poussard, 46, Gunter Grove, Chelsea.”

The first performance was announced for 28 November and Poussard did not object. She came to rehearsals. But because the composer delayed, Poussard did not get the music for the last part of the opera till a few days before the 28th. She was taken ill and did not attend the final rehearsals in the last week. Spiers and Pond engaged another performer, Miss Lewis to be ready to take over if Poussard could not. Miss Lewis would receive a douceur if she was not hired, and £15 a week if she was. Poussard continued to be ill for the first three days. On Thursday 4 December she was well again, but Spiers and Pond refused to have her back. Mr Poussard claimed for wrongful dismissal on his wife's behalf.

At trial before Field J in Middlesex Michaelmas sittings, the jury found that employing Miss L was reasonable under the circumstances. Spiers and Pond were given leave to claim £83 from Poussard. Poussard appealed.

== Judgment ==
Blackburn J (delivering the court's judgment) held that failing to turn up for the first performances entitled Spiers and Pond to rescind the contract, for this went to the root of the matter. Blackburn J stated the facts and then continued:

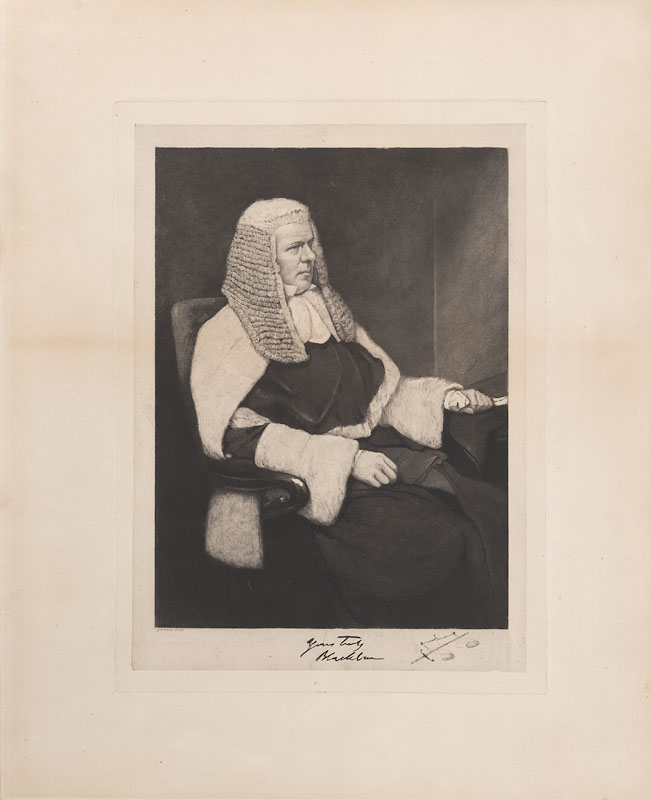
Blackburn J

We think that, from the nature of the engagement to take a leading, and, indeed, the principal female part (for the prima donna sang her part in male costume as the Prince de Conti) in a new opera which (as appears from the terms of the engagement) it was known might run for a longer or shorter time, and so be a profitable or losing concern to the defendants, we can, without the aid of the jury, see that it must have been of great importance to the defendants that the piece should start well, and consequently that the failure of the plaintiff's wife to be able to perform on the opening and early performances was a very serious detriment to them.

This inability having been occasioned by sickness was not any breach of contract by the plaintiff, and no action can lie against him for the failure thus occasioned. But the damage to the defendants and the consequent failure of consideration is just as great as if it had been occasioned by the plaintiff's fault, instead of by his wife's misfortune. The analogy is complete between this case and that of a charterparty in the ordinary terms, where the ship is to proceed in ballast (the act of God, &c., excepted) to a port and there load a cargo. If the delay is occasioned by excepted perils, the shipowner is excused. But if it is so great as to go to the root of the matter, it frees the charterer from his obligation to furnish a cargo: see per Bramwell B, delivering the judgment of the majority of the Court of Exchequer Chamber in Jackson v Union Marine Insurance.

And we think that the question, whether the failure of a skilled and capable artiste to perform in a new piece through serious illness is so important as to go to the root of the consideration, must to some extent depend on the evidence; and is a mixed question of law and fact. Theoretically, the facts should be left to and found separately by the jury, it being for the judge or the Court to say whether they, being so found, shew a breach of a condition precedent or not. But this course is often (if not generally) impracticable; and if we can see that the proper facts have been found, we should act on these without regard to the form of the questions.

Now, in the present case, we must consider what were the courses open to the defendants under the circumstances. They might, it was said on the argument before us (though not on the trial), have postponed the bringing out of the piece till the recovery of Madame Poussard, and if her illness had been a temporary hoarseness incapacitating her from singing on the Saturday, but sure to be removed by the Monday, that might have been a proper course to pursue. But the illness here was a serious one, of uncertain duration, and if the plaintiff had at the trial suggested that this was the proper course, it would, no doubt, have been shewn that it would have been a ruinous course; and that it would have been much better to have abandoned the piece altogether than to have postponed it from day to day for an uncertain time, during which the theatre would have been a heavy loss.

The remaining alternatives were to employ a temporary substitute until such time as the plaintiff's wife should recover; and if a temporary substitute capable of performing the part adequately could have been obtained upon such a precarious engagement on any reasonable terms, that would have been a right course to pursue; but if no substitute capable of performing the part adequately could be obtained, except on the terms that she should be permanently engaged at higher pay than the plaintiff's wife, in our opinion it follows, as a matter of law, that the failure on the plaintiff's part went to the root of the matter and discharged the defendants.

We think, therefore, that the fifth question put to the jury, and answered by them in favour of the defendants, does find all the facts necessary to enable us to decide as a matter of law that the defendants are discharged.

The fourth question is, no doubt, found by the jury for the plaintiff; but we think in finding it they must have made a mistake in law as to what was a sufficient failure of consideration to set the defendants at liberty, which was not a question for them.

This view taken by us renders it unnecessary to decide anything on the cross rule for a new trial.

The motion must be refused with costs.

== See also ==
Cited in argument for Spiers and Pond

- Bettini v Gye (1876) 1 QBD 183

Subsequent cases

- Torquay Hotel Co Ltd v Cousins [1969] 2 Ch 106
