= Exempt property =

Property which cannot be seized by creditors following bankruptcy

Exempt property, under the law of property in many jurisdictions, is property that can neither be passed by will nor claimed by creditors of the deceased in the event that a decedent leaves a surviving spouse or surviving descendants. Typically, exempt property includes a family car, and a certain amount of cash (perhaps $10,000-$20,000), or the equivalent value in personal property.

Exempt property calculations and provisions are determined on a state-by-state basis. This is important within the bankruptcy process, and may affect an individual's decision to file Chapter 7 or Chapter 13 bankruptcy. State exemptions vary from strict to generous. For example, Texas is more lenient in allowing your homestead and up to $60,000 in personal property. Texas also exempts certain investments and insurance policies. Other states, such as Arizona, are more strict and may exempt only $150 in a checking account comparatively speaking. Even further, other states have more moderate policies, with California's homestead exemption law providing between $300,000 to $600,000 of exempt equity in a homestead, depending on the county where the debtor is located.
