= Right of entry =

Right of entry refers to one's right to take or resume possession of land, or the right of a person to go onto another's real property without committing trespass. It also refers to a grantor's power to retake real estate from a grantee in the case of a fee simple subject to condition subsequent.
