= Chapter 7, Title 11, United States Code =

Section of United States federal statute

Chapter 7 of Title 11 U.S. Code is the bankruptcy code that governs the process of liquidation under the bankruptcy laws of the United States. This is in contrast to bankruptcy under Chapter 11 and Chapter 13, which govern the process of reorganization of a debtor. Chapter 7 bankruptcy is the most common form of bankruptcy in the US.

== For businesses ==
When a financially troubled business is unable to pay creditors, the business may file (or be compelled by creditors to file) for bankruptcy in a federal court under Chapter 7, which means that the business ceases operations unless those operations are continued by the Chapter 7 trustee. In a Chapter 7 bankruptcy, the trustee is appointed almost immediately, with broad powers to examine the finances of the business in bankruptcy; generally, the trustee sells the assets and distributes the money to the creditors.

The investors who took the least amount of risk prior to the bankruptcy are generally paid first. For example, secured creditors will have taken less risk, because the credit that they will have extended is usually backed by collateral, such as assets of the debtor company. Fully secured creditors—that is, creditors, such as collateralized bondholders and mortgage lenders, for whom the value of collateral equals or exceeds the amount of debt outstanding—have a legally enforceable right to the collateral securing their loans or to the equivalent value, a right that generally cannot be defeated by bankruptcy.

In a Chapter 7 case, a corporation or partnership does not receive a bankruptcy discharge, whereas an individual may (see 11 U.S.C. § 727(a)(1)). Once all assets of the corporate or partnership debtor have been fully administered, the case is closed. The debts of the corporation or partnership theoretically continue to exist until applicable statutory periods of limitations expire.

== For individuals ==
Individuals who reside, have a place of business, or own property in the United States may file for bankruptcy in a federal court under Chapter 7 ("straight bankruptcy", or liquidation). Chapter 7, as with other bankruptcy chapters, is not available to individuals who have had bankruptcy cases dismissed within the prior 180 days under specified circumstances.

In a Chapter 7 bankruptcy the individual is allowed to keep certain exempt property. However most liens (such as real estate mortgages and security interests for car loans) survive. The value of property that can be claimed as exempt varies from state to state. Other assets, if any, are sold (liquidated) by the trustee to repay creditors. Many types of unsecured debt are legally discharged by the bankruptcy proceeding, but there are various types of debt that are not discharged in a Chapter 7. Common exceptions to discharge include child support, income taxes less than three years old, property taxes, student loans (unless the debtor prevails in a adversary proceeding brought to determine the dischargeability of the student loan), and fines and restitution imposed by a court for any crimes committed by the debtor. Spousal support is likewise not covered by a bankruptcy filing, nor are property settlements through divorce. Despite their potential non-dischargeability, all debts must be listed on bankruptcy schedules.

A Chapter 7 bankruptcy stays on an individual's credit report for ten years from the date of filing the Chapter 7 petition. This contrasts with a Chapter 13 bankruptcy, which stays on an individual's credit report for seven years from the date of filing the Chapter 13 petition. This may make credit less available or may make lending terms less favorable, although high debt can have the same effect.

Another aspect to consider is whether the debtor can avoid a challenge by the United States Trustee to their Chapter 7 filing as abusive. One factor in considering whether the U.S. Trustee can prevail in a challenge to the debtor's Chapter 7 filing is whether the debtor can otherwise afford to repay some or all of his debts out of disposable income in the five year time frame provided by Chapter 13. If so, then the U.S. Trustee may succeed in preventing the debtor from receiving a discharge under Chapter 7, effectively forcing the debtor into Chapter 13.

The Bankruptcy Abuse Prevention and Consumer Protection Act of 2005 made changes to the U.S. Bankruptcy Code that include, along with many other reforms, language imposing a means test for Chapter 7 cases.

Creditworthiness and the likelihood of receiving a Chapter 7 discharge are some of the issues to be considered in determining whether to file bankruptcy. The effect of bankruptcy on creditworthiness in many cases might not be significant, because by the time many debtors are ready to file for bankruptcy, their credit score is already extremely low. Also, new credit extended post-petition is not covered by the discharge, so creditors may offer new credit to the newly-bankrupt.

== Methods of filing ==
Official Federal bankruptcy forms are prescribed in the relevant Rules, and are a computer based equivalent option of paper forms. Software can also be used, which generates court-ready forms and is more simple for users. Bankruptcy petition preparers can aid in completing applications, as can a bankruptcy attorney.

== BAPCPA revisions ==
On October 17, 2005, the Bankruptcy Abuse Prevention and Consumer Protection Act (BAPCPA) went into effect. This legislation was the biggest reform to the bankruptcy laws since 1978. The legislation was enacted after years of lobbying efforts by banks and lending institutions and was intended to prevent abuses of the bankruptcy laws.

=== Means test ===
The most noteworthy change brought by the 2005 BAPCPA amendments occurred within §707(b). The amendments effectively subject most debtors who have an income, as calculated by the Code, above the debtor's state census median income to a 60-month disposable income based test. This test is referred to as the "means test". The means test provides for a finding of abuse if the debtor's disposable monthly income is higher than a specified floor amount or portion of their debts. If a presumption of abuse is found under the means test, it may only be rebutted in the case of "special circumstances." Debtors whose income is below the state's median income are not subject to the means test.

Notably, the Code-calculated income is based on the prior six months and may be higher or lower than the debtor's actual current income at the time of filing for bankruptcy. This has led some commentators to refer to the bankruptcy code's "current monthly income" as "presumed income". If the debtor's debt is not primarily consumer debt, then the means test is inapplicable. The inapplicability to non-consumer debt allows business debtors to "abuse" credit without repercussion unless the court finds "cause."

"Special circumstances" does not confer judicial discretion; rather, it gives a debtor an opportunity to adjust income by documenting additional expenses or loss of income in situations caused by a medical condition or being called or order to active military service. However, the assumption of abuse is only rebutted where the additional expenses or adjustments for loss of income are significant enough to change the outcome of the means test. Otherwise, abuse is still presumed despite the "special circumstances."

=== Credit counseling ===
Another major change to the law enacted by BAPCPA deals with eligibility. §109(h) provides that a debtor will no longer be eligible to file under either Chapter 7 or Chapter 13 unless within 180 days prior to filing, the debtor received an "individual or group briefing" from a nonprofit budget and credit counseling agency approved by the United States trustee or bankruptcy administrator. The new legislation also requires that all individual debtors in either Chapter 7 or Chapter 13 complete an "instructional course concerning personal financial management." If a Chapter 7 debtor does not complete the course, this constitutes grounds for denial of discharge pursuant to new §727(a)(11). The financial management program is experimental and the effectiveness of the program is to be studied for 18 months.

=== Applicability of exemptions ===
BAPCPA attempted to eliminate the perceived "forum shopping" by changing the rules on claiming exemptions. Under BAPCPA, a debtor who has moved from one state to another within two years of filing (730 days) the bankruptcy case must use exemptions from the place of the debtor's domicile for the majority of the 180-day period preceding the two years (730 days) before the filing (§522(b)(3)). If the new residency requirement would render the debtor ineligible for any exemption, then the debtor can choose the federal exemptions.

BAPCPA also "capped" the amount of a homestead exemption that a debtor can claim in bankruptcy, despite state exemption statutes. Also, there is a "cap" placed upon the homestead exemption in situations where the debtor, within 1,215 days (about 3 years and 4 months) preceding the bankruptcy case, added value to a homestead. The provision provides that "any value in excess of $125,000" added to a homestead can not be exempted. The only exception is if the value was transferred from another homestead within the same state or if the homestead is the principal residence of a family farmer (§522(p)). This "cap" would apply in situations where a debtor has purchased a new homestead in a different state, or where the debtor has increased the value to their homestead (presumably through a remodeling or addition).

=== Lien avoidance ===
Some types of liens may be avoided through a Chapter 7 bankruptcy case. However, BAPCPA limited the ability of debtors to avoid liens through bankruptcy. The definition of "household goods" was changed limiting "electronic equipment" to one radio, one television, one VCR, and one personal computer with related equipment. The definition now excludes works of art not created by the debtor or a relative of the debtor, jewelry worth more than $500 (except wedding rings), and motor vehicles (§522(f)(1)(B)). Prior to BAPCPA, the definition of household goods was broader so that more items could have been included, including more than one television, VCR, radio, etc.

=== Other changes ===
- Decreased the number and type of debts that could be discharged in bankruptcy. Decreased limits for discharge of debts incurred discharging luxury goods. Expanded the scope of student loans not dischargeable without undue hardship.
- Increase the time in which a debtor may have multiple discharges from 6 to 8 years.
- Limited the duration of the automatic stay, particularly for debtors who had filed within one year of a previous bankruptcy. Automatic stay may be extended at the discretion of the court.
- BAPCPA limited the applicability of the automatic stay in eviction proceedings. If the landlord has already obtained a judgment of possession prior to the bankruptcy case being filed, a debtor must deposit an escrow for rent with the Bankruptcy Court, and the stay may be lifted if the debtor does not pay the landlord in full within 30 days thereafter, §362(b)(22). The stay also would not apply in a situation where the eviction is based on "endangerment" of the rented property or "illegal use of controlled substances" on the property, §362(b)(23).
- BAPCPA enacts a provision that protects creditors from monetary penalties for violating the stay if the debtor did not give "effective" notice pursuant to [§342(g)]. The new notice provisions require the debtor to give notice of the bankruptcy to the creditor at an "address filed by the creditor with the court" or "at an address stated in two communications from the creditor to the debtor within 90 days of the filing of the bankruptcy case".
