= Defeasible estate =

Estate created when land is transferred conditionally

A defeasible estate is created when a grantor transfers land conditionally. Upon the happening of the event or condition stated by the grantor, the transfer may be void or at least subject to annulment. (An estate not subject to such conditions is called an indefeasible estate.) Historically, the common law has frowned on the use of defeasible estates as it interferes with the owners' enjoyment of their property and as such has made it difficult to create a valid future interest. Unless a defeasible estate is clearly intended, modern courts will construe the language against this type of estate. Three types of defeasible estates are the fee simple determinable, the fee simple subject to an executory limitation or interest, and the fee simple subject to a condition subsequent. A life estate may also be defeasible.

Because a defeasible estate always grants less than a full fee simple, a defeasible estate will always create one or more future interests.

== Fee simple determinable ==
A fee simple determinable is an estate that will end automatically when the stated event or condition occurs. The interest will revert to the grantor or the heirs of the grantor. Normally, a possibility of reverter follows a fee simple determinable. However, a possibility of reverter does not follow a fee simple determinable subject to an executory interest, because a possibility of reverter is in the grantor while an executory interest is in a third party. Durational language such as "to A as long as the property is used for a park" creates a fee simple determinable and a possibility of reverter. Other durational words interpreted to grant a fee simple determinable include "until," "during," and "while."

Some jurisdictions in the United States have abolished this interest. For example, Kentucky abolished the fee simple determinable and possibility of reverter by statute in 1960. An attempt to create such an interest is construed as a fee simple subject to condition subsequent (see below), and a person who would have possibility of reverter at common law will instead have a right of entry.

A fee simple determinable does not violate the rule against perpetuities, since a possibility of reverter is not subject to the rule.

== Fee simple subject to an executory limitation ==
A fee simple subject to an executory limitation is an estate that ends when a specific condition is met and then transfers to a third party. The interest will not revert to the grantor. If the condition is met, the grantee loses the interest and the third party gains it automatically.

Example:

O grants Blackacre to A and A's heir; but if A ever accepts a candy bar from C, then to B and B's heirs.

Here, O is the original owner. He grants A a fee simple subject to the subsequent condition that he doesn't accept a candy bar from C. However, unlike a fee simple subject to a condition subsequent, Blackacre goes to a third party (B) instead of the grantor (O) if the condition is met. Also, unlike a fee simple subject to a condition subsequent, B then automatically gains the interest in Blackacre and does not only have a mere right to sue for re-entry.

Conveyance of Blackacre by the original grantee carries the original limitation with it, but the interest of the subsequent grantee could become fee simple absolute upon the original grantee's subsequent death. For example, A sells Blackacre to D. If A afterwards accepted an offer for a candy bar from C, Blackacre automatically goes to B. However, if A died without ever accepting a candy bar from C, the condition could not possibly be met. D would then have a fee simple absolute.

== Fee simple subject to condition subsequent ==
A fee simple subject to a condition subsequent is created when the words of a grant support the conclusion that the grantor intends to convey a fee simple absolute but has attached a condition to the grant so that if a specified future event happens the grantor will get its fee simple absolute back, provided that the grantor exercises his right of entry (or power of termination). Thus, a fee simple subject to condition subsequent does not end automatically upon the happening of the condition. The future interest is called a "right of reentry" or "right of entry", and the property only reverts to the original grantor if he exercises this right.

The right of entry is not automatic, but rather must be exercised to terminate the fee simple subject to condition subsequent. To exercise right of entry, the holder must take substantial steps to recover possession and title, for example, by filing a lawsuit. Physical entry is not required, but the holder must do more than just proclaim an intent to take back.

One of the languages used to create a fee simple subject to condition subsequent and a right of entry is "to A, but if A sells alcohol on the land, then grantor has the right of entry (or power of termination)."

Common uses include language such as "may", "but if", "however", or "provided that..."
