= Condition precedent =

Event required before something else will occur

A condition precedent is an event or state of affairs that is required before something else will occur. In contract law, a condition precedent is an event which must occur, unless its non-occurrence is excused, before performance under a contract becomes due, i.e., before any contractual duty exists.

In estate and trust law, it is a provision in a will or trust that prevents the vesting of a gift or bequest until something occurs or fails to occur, e.g. the attainment of a certain age or the predecease of another person. For comparison, a condition subsequent brings a duty to an end whereas a condition precedent initiates a duty.

In computing, a while loop is an instruction to check a condition precedent, then execute an action only if that check evaluates to 'true'; after which execution, control then returns to the beginning of the loop and the cycle of check and conditional execution begins again. By contrast, a do while loop first executes the action, next checks a condition subsequent, then returns control to the beginning of the loop if the check evaluated to 'true'. Either loop ends once a check is evaluated to 'false', after which control flow proceeds onward, now "outside" of the loop instruction.

== Cases ==
- Poussard v Spiers and Pond (1876) 1 QBD 410

== See also ==
- Condition subsequent
- Necessary condition
- Sufficient condition
