= JT Stratford & Son Ltd v Lindley =

- Court: House of Lords
- Decided: 28 July 1964
- Citations: [1965] AC 269; [1964] 3 WLR 541; [1964] 3 All ER 102; [1964] 2 Lloyd's Rep 133; [1964] 7 WLUK 102; 108 SJLB 636; (1964) 108 SJ 636; [1964] CLY 3702

Case history
- Prior actions: JT Stratford & Son v Lindley [1964] 1 Lloyd's Rep 138 (High Court); JT Stratford & Son v Lindley [1964] 2 WLR 1002 (Court of Appeal)
- Appealed from: Court of Appeal (Civil Division)
- Related actions: JT Stratford & Son v Lindley [1969] 1 WLUK 7 (High Court); JT Stratford & Son v Lindley [1969] 1 WLR 1547 (Court of Appeal)

Court membership
- Judges sitting: Lord Reid, Viscount Radcliffe, Lord Pearce, Lord Upjohn, Lord Donovan

Keywords
- Right to strike, common law, fundamental right

JT Stratford & Son Ltd v Lindley [1965] AC 269 is a UK labour law case that concerns economic tort and strike action.

== Facts ==
The union embargoed JT Stratford & Son, the parent company of a subsidiary that the union was in dispute with. They refused to handle the barges of JT Stratford.

== Judgment ==
The House of Lords held

Lord Reid said the following.

The respondents' action made it practically impossible for the appellants to do any new business with the barge hirers.

It was not disputed that such interference is tortious if any unlawful means are employed.

== See also ==
- UK labour law
- English tort law
