= Future interest =

Right to property taking effect later

In property law and real estate, a future interest is a legal right to property ownership that does not include the right to present possession or enjoyment of the property. Future interests are created on the formation of a defeasible estate; that is, an estate with a condition or event triggering transfer of possessory ownership. A common example is the landlord-tenant relationship. The landlord may own a house, but has no general right to enter it while it is being rented. The conditions triggering the transfer of possession, first to the tenant then back to the landlord, are usually detailed in a lease.

As a slightly more complicated example, suppose O is the owner of Blackacre. Consider what happens when O transfers the property, "to A for life, then to B". Person A acquires possession of Blackacre. Person B does not receive any right to possess Blackacre immediately; however, once person A dies, possession will fall to person B (or his estate, if he died before person A). Person B has a future interest in the property. In this example, the event triggering the transfer is person A's death.

Because they convey ownership rights, future interests can usually be sold, gifted, willed, or otherwise disposed of by the beneficiary (but see Vesting below). Because the rights vest in the future, any such disposition will occur before the beneficiary actually takes possession of the property.

There are five kinds of future interests recognized at common law: three in the transferor and two in the transferee.

== Vesting ==
Vesting means granting a person an immediate right to present or future enjoyment of property. In plain English, one has a right to a vested asset that cannot be taken away by any third party, even though one may not yet possess the asset. When the right, interest or title to the present or future possession of a legal estate can be transferred by its holder to any other party, it is termed a vested interest with respect to that holder.

A vested interest may be one of three types:

- A future interest is absolutely (or indefeasibly) vested if its beneficiary must (legally) eventually take possessory ownership.
- A future interest is vested subject to divestment if something could occur that would divest the remainder of an interest. For example, "From O to A for life, then to B, but if A stops growing corn, then to C": B would have a vested remainder subject to divestment because he could be divested of his interest by an act of A before the interest becomes possessory.
- A future interest is vested subject to open if it belongs to a class of beneficiaries, where that class can expand. A common example is a grant from O "to A's children", where A is a man: the class of A's children can't be closed until approximately thirty eight weeks after A dies, so any children alive at the time of the grant are vested subject to open. This interest is also sometimes referred to as being vested subject to partial divestment.

A person may divest themselves of, or alienate, only those interests that are guaranteed to vest. This rule aligns with the policy that a person should not be allowed to sell a thing that he or she does not own outright. Interests that are not guaranteed to vest are subject to the rule against perpetuities.

== Future interests in the transferor ==
=== Reversion ===
A reversion occurs when a granted estate is absolutely vested in the grantor.

- Example: "O grants Blackacre to A for life."
- Analysis (O): A is guaranteed to die (eventually), at which point Blackacre returns to O. This future interest is absolutely (indefeasibly) vested in O.
- Analysis (A): A has a life estate.
- Alienation: O can alienate her future interest. A can alienate his rights in the property, but only to the extent that those rights were granted him (i.e., as a life estate). So A can sell Blackacre to B, but once A dies it returns to O. Notice that B has no control over this kind of vesting.

Reversion is not subject to the rule against perpetuities, because O's future interest is absolutely vested.

=== Possibility of reverter ===
There is a possibility of reverter when an estate will return to the grantor if a condition is violated. The possibility of reverter can only follow a fee simple determinable.

- Example: "O grants Blackacre to A as long as A refrains from drinking alcohol."
- Analysis: If A never drinks after the grant (and never sells the property), then Blackacre will belong to A at O's death, and be distributed according to the rules of probate. If A does drink after the grant, then the property returns to O.
- Language used: Durational. Examples include "for as long as", "while", and "during".
- Alienation: O's interest is freely transferable.

This type of future interest can only follow the fee simple determinable. The vesting of the future interest is determinable at the time of the grant, because reverter is automatic if the condition is broken—a possibility of reverter, therefore, is not subject to the Rule Against Perpetuities.

=== Right of entry (or power of termination) ===
This type of future interest follows a fee simple subject to a condition subsequent. A grantor has the power of termination when an estate may return to the grantor if a condition is violated and the grantor decides to reclaim the estate. This type of grant may occur when the grantor wants the option of deciding the severity of the violation.

- Example: "O grants Blackacre to A, on condition that A refrains from drinking alcohol."
- Analysis: If A never drinks after the grant (and never sells the property), then Blackacre will belong to A at O's death, and be distributed according to the rules of probate. If A does drink after the grant, then A's rights in Blackacre end, although A is still in possession of Blackacre.
- Language used: Conditional. Examples include "on condition", "if used for", and "provided that".
- Alienation: O's interest is vested. This interest is never subject to the rule against perpetuities. O's interest cannot be transferred inter vivos ("between living people"); can only be transferred by will or by intestate succession upon death of the grantor.

This type of future interest follows a fee simple subject to a condition subsequent. To see why, consider that in order to retain Blackacre, A must continue to perform under the terms of the grant (by not drinking). If A fails to "not drink", that condition will trigger the subsequent loss of A's rights in Blackacre.

== Future interests in a transferee ==
=== Remainders ===
A remainder is a future interest in a third party that vests upon the natural conclusion of the grant to the original grantee. It is the interest in the property that is "left over", or remains, after the original grantee is finished possessing it. For example, O's grant "to A for life, then to B" creates a remainder in B. There are two types of remainders: vested and contingent.

==== Vested remainders ====
A vested remainder is created when property is granted to both a direct grantee and a named third party, and is not subject to a condition precedent to the third party taking possession.

- Example: "O grants Blackacre to A for life, then to B".
- Analysis (A): A has a life estate.
- Analysis (B): B has a vested remainder, because Blackacre will vest in B after A dies, with no further conditions.
- Alienation: B may divest his (absolutely) vested remainder, which is not subject to the rule against perpetuities. A is subject to the rules regarding divestiture of a life estate, as noted above.
- Question: If B dies before A, who takes possession upon A's death? Answer: B's estate. The terms "and his heirs" are assumed to be part of the conveyance.

===== Vested remainders subject to open =====
- Example: "O grants Blackacre to A for life, then to B's children".
- Analysis: The class of B's children can't be determined until approximately thirty-eight weeks after A dies, so any children who are unborn at the time of the grant have a remainder contingent upon B having offspring. Children of B are fully vested as soon as they are born, provided A is still alive. B's children who are born have vested remainder subject to open, because the conveyance was given to a class of persons (B's Children) and B could still have more children. If B dies before A, then the class is closed, and only those children alive at A's death will have an interest.

===== Vested remainders subject to total divestment =====
- Example: "O grants Blackacre to A for life, then to B, unless B and C have divorced (at the time A dies)".
- Analysis (O): If B and C have not divorced before A dies, B will own Blackacre. If B has divorced C, then the property will vest in O (or O's estate) without O having to make a claim for it. So O has a reversion.
- Analysis (A): A has a life estate.
- Analysis (B): B has a vested remainder subject to total divestment. Blackacre vests in B, but divests if B has divorced C (before the moment A dies).
- Alienation: B can alienate because his remainder is vested. His interest divests if the condition subsequent occurs.

Note: a different result would be reached if the grant was "O to A for life, then to B, unless B and C are not married (at the time A dies)". In this case, B's interest would not divest even if B had divorced C because he could remarry C before A's death. The condition subsequent is a state of affairs (married to C) at a certain time (A's death), not an event (divorce) occurring before a certain time (A's death).

==== Contingent remainders ====
A contingent remainder is created when a remainder cannot fully vest at the time of granting. This normally occurs in two situations:

- when the property can't vest because the beneficiary is unknown (for example, if the beneficiary is a class subject to open), or
- when the property can't vest because the (known) beneficiary is subject to a condition precedent which has not yet occurred.

Legislatures and courts tend to prefer vested remainders over contingent remainders, to reduce uncertainty in ambiguous grants, and to speed up probate.

=== Executory interests ===
An executory interest is a future interest, held by a third-party transferee (i.e. someone other than the grantor), which either cuts off another's interest or begins some time after the natural termination of a preceding estate. An executory interest vests upon any condition subsequent except the natural termination of the original grantee's rights. In other words, an executory interest is any future interest held by a third party that isn't a remainder.

Executory interests usually arise when a grantor gives property to one person, provided that they use it a certain way. If the person fails to use it properly, the property transfers to a third party. There are two different types of executory interests: shifting and springing. Executory limitations transferring ownership from the grantor to a third party are called springing executory interests, and those that transfer from the grantee to a third party are called shifting executory interests.

==== Shifting executory interest ====
A shifting executory interest cuts short someone other than the grantor. For example, if O conveys property "To A, but if B returns from Florida within the next year, to B"; here, B has a shifting executory interest, and A has a fee simple subject to this shifting executory interest. A shifting executory interest may be premised on any event, irrespective of whether that event is under the control of one party or the other, or if it is an external event under the control of neither party. For example, a conveyance "To A, but if the property is ever used as a commercial dairy, to B" would leave A in control of the condition; so long as A does not use the property in the proscribed manner it will remain hers. Conversely, a conveyance "To A, but if B receives a law degree, to B" places B entirely in control of the dispensation of the property; if B is able to fulfill the condition, B will get the property irrespective of what A does. Finally, the interest may shift based on a wholly external event, for example, "To A, but if the Cleveland Browns win the Super Bowl, to B".

If the conveyance to A is for a limited time, or for the life of A, then the condition triggering the executory interest must occur within that time, or the property will return to the grantor.

- Example: "O grants Blackacre to A for life, but if A ever drinks alcohol, then Blackacre immediately goes to B."
- A has a possessory interest in life estate subject to executory limitation (B's executory interest).
- B has an executory interest, because his interest does not vest unless A's life estate terminates due to the 'unnatural' condition subsequent. The interest is shifting, because if A drinks, then the property "shifts" from one grantee to another. If A never drinks, then A will retain ownership, and on A's death the property will go to O, or the heirs of O.

==== Springing executory interest ====
A springing executory interest divests the grantor's own interest, in favor of the grantee. For example, O conveys to A for life, and one year after A's death to B and his heirs. O will have a one-year interest, that will spring/be cut short one year after A's death, and will go to B, the grantee.

Suppose B is 15 years old.

- Example: "O grants Blackacre to A for life and one year after A's death, to B if B reaches the age of 25 years."
- Analysis (O): O has a reversion (see above), since there is a one-year gap between A's estate and the succeeding estate
- Analysis (A): A has a possessory interest for life
- Analysis (B): B has a springing executory interest, since B's future interest follows the reversion to O, and if B reaches the age of 25 years after A's death B's interest sets aside O's interest and claims the Fee Simple

==== Limitations on the creation of executory interests ====
The grantor never retains an ultimate future interest when there is an executory condition present. If the executory condition is never met, the original grantee retains the interest, while if the condition is met, the interest transfers to a third party. However, the grantor may have a future possessory interest.

Executory interests are subject to the rule against perpetuities, which disqualifies any interest that can vest more than twenty-one years after the death of every party who was living at the time the interest was created. However, if all of the potential vesting beneficiaries are named, the rule will never be violated. Thus, a property can not be conveyed "to A and her heirs, but if alcohol is consumed on the property, to B and his heirs". Because A's heirs may hew to the condition for generations, causing a violation centuries after the condition was set down and creating chaos in efforts to shift title to the appropriate heirs of B.

Third party beneficiaries of executory interests cannot alienate them, since the interests are contingent upon a condition subsequent, so the interest is not guaranteed to vest.

== See also ==
- Executory contract
- Executory interest
- Rule against perpetuities
