= Life estate =

Ownership of land for the duration of a person's life

In common law and statutory law, a life estate (or life tenancy) is the ownership of immovable property for the duration of a person's life. In legal terms, it is an estate in real property that ends at death, when the property rights may revert to the original owner or to another person. The owner of a life estate is called a "life tenant". The person who will take over the rights upon death is said to have a "remainder" interest and is known as a "remainderman".

== Principles ==
The ownership of a life estate is of limited duration because it ends at the death of a person. Its owner is the life tenant (typically also the 'measuring life') and it carries with it right to enjoy certain benefits of ownership of the property, chiefly income derived from rent or other uses of the property and the right of occupation, during his or her possession. Because a life estate ceases to exist at the death of the measuring person's life, the life tenant, a temporary owner, may short-term let but cannot sell, give or bequeath the property indefinitely (including assuming it could pass to heirs (intestate)) or creating a purported document leaving it to devisees (testate).

A life estate pur autre vie (Law French, "for the life of another") is held for the rest of the lifetime of a person who does not hold the estate, known as the cestui que vie (Law French, "the person who lives"). This form of life estate arises where a life tenant has disposed of the property, assuming such a disposal does not trigger any special forfeiture under the life interest instrument. It also arises where the grantor chooses to make the measuring life that of someone other than the life tenant's life. A life estate pur autre vie is most commonly created in one of two circumstances.

- First, when the owner of property conveys his interest in that property to another person, for the life of a third person. For example, if A conveys land to B during the life of C, then B owns the land for as long as C lives; if B dies before C, B's heirs will inherit the land, and will continue to own it for as long as C lives.
- Second, if A conveys land to C for life, C can then sell the life estate to B. Again, B and B's heirs will own the land for as long as C lives.
- In either scenario, once C dies, the ownership of the land will revert to A. If A has died, ownership will revert to A's heirs. The right to succeed to ownership of the property upon the expiration of the life estate is called a reversion. However, the remainder interest granted to a third party (A to B for life, with a remainder interest in C), is called "remainder".

A clear distinction should be made with an estate for (a) term of years, interpreted as lease or licence.

At death, assuming no mis-dealings to certain innocent purchasers, the property involved in a life estate falls into the ownership of the remainderman (pl. remaindermen) or reverts to its grantor (all of which confusingly can be called 'reversions' and 'reversioners'). There is a small market for reversions in real estate, which necessitates a buyer to carry out enhanced documentary due diligence and physical checks.

A land owner of an estate cannot give a "greater interest" in the estate than he or she owns. That is, a life estate owner cannot give complete and indefinite ownership (fee simple) to another person because the life tenant's ownership in the property ends when the person who is the measuring life dies. For instance, if Ashley conveyed to Bob for the life of Bob, and Bob conveys a life estate to another person, Charlie, for Charlie's life [an embedded life estate], then Charlie's life estate interest would last only until Charlie or Bob dies. Charlie's life interest or pur autre vie interest (interest for the life of another, whichever has applied) and most often the remaining rights of ownership in the property (the 'reversionary interest') devolve to the persons under the terms of the will/rules of intestacy/declaration of trust/trust deed (UK) or will/rules of intestacy/'grant or deed of life interest' (or similar) (U.S.) in remainder or revert to the original grantee, depending on terms of Ashley. Such a life estate in the U.S. can also be conveyed for the life of the grantor, such as "A conveys X to B until A dies" and in the UK by trust transferring upon trust or assigning rather than conveying X.

If a life tenant purports to transfer the underlying 'reversionary' interest, which a life tenant never has, this constitutes an actionable breach of trust for damages and may constitute criminal fraud however may not entitle the ultimate reversioner (or substituted beneficiaries) to be able to obtain a court declaration that the property is their own if that property is in the hands of an innocent purchaser for value without notice (bona fide purchaser).

Financial and physical responsibility falls to the life tenant under the legal doctrine of waste, which prohibits life tenants from damaging or devaluing the asset. In short, as the life tenant's ownership is temporary, failing to maintain or reasonably protect the asset resulting in its diminution in value, or indeed, destruction constitutes a cause of action for the reversioner.

A further limitation is the rule against perpetuities in many states and countries which prohibits long-running pre-19th-century style successions of life tenancies and may result in the premature and compensation-entitling termination of such successive life interests. In England and Wales this is fixed at one lifetime, or 80 years whichever is longer.

Selling property while keeping a life estate is commonly known in France as "viager" where it is used more often than elsewhere, most famously in the case of Jeanne Calment, the longest lived human ever recorded.

In the combined jurisdiction of England and Wales since 1925 a freehold estate intended to be 'held' as a life interest takes effect only as an interest enjoyed in equity, specifically as an interest in possession trust. The other type of land ownership is leasehold and although most long leases are for a period of between 99 and 999 years 'leases for life' will be interpreted in often unpredictable ways as either as a licence or a lease.

== Uses of a life estate ==
In the United States, a life estate is typically used as a tool of an estate planning. A life estate can avoid probate and ensure that an intended heir will receive title to real property. For example, Al owns a home and desires that Bill inherit it after Al's death. Al can effectuate that desire by transferring title to the home to Bill and retaining a life estate in the home. Al keeps a life estate and Bill receives a vested fee simple remainder. As soon as Al dies, the life estate interest merges with Bill's remainder, and Bill has a fee simple title. An advantage of such a transfer is that it makes the use of a will unnecessary and eliminates the need to probate the asset. A disadvantage is the small risk of a fraud on the part of beneficiary Bill, if he could easily show in a particular jurisdiction an unfettered fee simple, he could sell the estate prematurely to an innocent purchaser such as when Al is on vacation. A second disadvantage to the grantor is that provision for any remainderman (or men) (party C) is irrevocable without the remainderman's consent. "Beneficiary deeds" have been statutorily created in some states to address this issue.

The intestacy laws of certain American states, limit the surviving spouse's rights (inheritance) to the deceased spouse's real estate to a life estate. Louisiana, applying civil law, has a similar default provision in intestate successions called a usufruct, which is only over community property and ends with the earlier of death or remarriage.

Some American states allow for an enhanced life estate deed, in which the grantor retains the ability to transfer to property to a third party without the consent of the remainderman. If the enhanced life estate holder still owns the property at the time he or she dies, and the remaindermen survive the life estate holder, the property automatically passes to the remaindermen outside of probate. Enhanced life estate deeds are also sometimes referred to as Lady Bird Deeds.

The intestacy laws of England and Wales from 1 October 2014 provide for £250,000 (or the whole non-joint estate if less) and 50% of any excess to the spouse, remainder to adult children. This abolished the remaining 50% being enjoyed as a life interest which had applied from the 1920s.

The surviving spouse (and rarely, others) benefit from survivorship of any joint property.

The arrangement in the first paragraph would in the UK be interpreted as an interest in possession trust and is usually avoided as for inheritance tax is considered 'reservation of benefit' requiring fully backdated sums of annual income tax on whatever market rent ought to have been paid to the legal owner, in England and Wales for continued enjoyment of the asset.

== Valuation of a life estate ==
A valuation is typically derived from the present value of the net benefit derived by the life (or lives) over the residual term of the interest. Where these valuations are based on a single life, reference can be made to tables such as life tenant factors by gender and age. These factors are prepared taking into account life expectancies and prevailing interest rates for a specific jurisdiction or purpose. An example is a table of life tenancy factors that is used to determine the proportion of a property attributable to a particular life tenant for any stamp duty payable upon its transfer. More complicated examples can involve impaired or joint lives and specialist advice is usually required such as that provided by an actuary.

== Duration of a life estate ==
Life estates are measured either by the life of the property recipient (pur sa vie), or by the life of some other person (pur autre vie).

== Validity of a life estate ==
=== At law and in equity (US) ===
Life estates in real estate are still created today. The life estate is more commonly used in trust instruments, typically in an attempt to minimize the effect of the inheritance tax or other taxes on transfers of wealth. A prospective reduction in tax for the creator ('settlor') often follows if the settlor has parted with all current and future interest. However many tax codes transfer the burden of estate taxes to the holder of the interest in possession (life tenant) and may treat that person or the remaindermen as owning a second/surplus property.

Formally, where a system is derived from English law, the law divides into common law and equitable law. A claim under equitable law cannot usually defeat a claim to title from a bona fide purchaser for value without notice, as such a person has reasonably researched the ownership position based upon the legal title (common law) position. The owner of a legal interest can create from a life estate further embedded or legal interests consistent with the form of ownership.

Accordingly, due to their potential versatility and complexity in the U.S., common law seldom recognizes a life estate in personal property (tangible items and livestock other than land including buildings) but such interests are recognized at equity where of adequate form — statutes and regulations impose formalities on the creation of lifetime interests in personalty.

=== At equity (England and Wales) ===
Since 1925 registered titles in England and Wales preferably should, but mostly do not, reveal an 'interest for life', 'life estate' or 'life tenancy' in the form of a restriction on the register. Instead the registered legal owner may hold various degrees of leasehold or freehold interest, but usually absolute interest. This provides a reliable 'mirror of title' which can only be subjected to a very few overriding interests. A maxim of equity is 'Where equities are equal, the law will prevail'. Equity defers to the position at law of a bona fide purchaser for value without notice (including any tenant or mortgagee), and as 'equity will not suffer a wrong to be without remedy,' where there is such, will be limited to in personam remedies against the settlor or life tenant where it confirms life estates, upon trust, to have been validly created:

1. for the life tenant(s); and thereafter
2. for remainderman, remaindermen or the reversionary settlor.

Life tenants are never recorded as proprietors at the Land Registry as they are temporary, equitable owners and are not entitled to have the a transfer of the land effected. If the proprietor has died, executors of the will, administrators or beneficiaries all have the right to apply for the standard form A restriction and are encouraged by the official guidance to do so.

If a lease is for more than seven years, the lease must be registered. Most long leases are for a period of between 99 and 999 years, and 'leases for life' will be interpreted either as a licence or a lease.

=== Torrens title jurisdictions ===
In most Torrens title jurisdictions a life tenant has, like in UK and US, the right to possession and enjoyment of the property, but once the tenant dies the property will return to the remainderman. The main difference is that, the life estate will be registered by the Registrar general of that jurisdiction, and will appear on the registered title. This has the effect of making them one of the 9 types of recognised interest in land, and one of the four that confirm possession. The registration process in Torrens title systems usually confers indefeasibility on the life estate.

A holder of a life estate can alienate his rights, but they will still expire on his death, regardless of whom he alienates it to. At that point, that buyer will have to forfeit the land.

== Life tenancy investments ==
It is becoming increasingly popular for private investors to place funds into a life tenancy investment. This type of investment is being offered as an alternative to traditional buy to let and is becoming increasingly popular in the United Kingdom with over £30 million worth of Life Tenancies being delivered in 2018.

== History ==
=== Scandinavia ===
In Denmark, Norway, and Sweden life estates (livgeding; lit. 'life contract') were historically fiefs under the crown, which the holder had the authority to administer and tax during their lifetime, before reverting to the monarchy upon their death.

From the late Middle Ages onwards, such life estates were primarily granted towards widows of the nobility, especially queen dowagers. The life estate was typically agreed upon during marriage negotiations and granted with the intention of providing for the maintenance of a widow until their death. In such cases, a distinction between a life estate and a dower was not always made. Life estates granted to queen dowagers played an important political role in Scandinavia during the 14th and 15th centuries, as they were used to secure the power of the monarchy.

=== Germany ===
In the late Holy Roman Empire, a leibgedinge (or German: Leibgut, lit. 'Life property') was a legal obligation to provide for the maintenance of an individual until their death. In particular, this applied to the provision of deeds to agricultural land whereby the owner of a farm retained residential rights, a share of the farm's yield, and/or a monetary stipend from the heir to their property. Currently in the Federal Republic of Germany, the term leibgedinge is still used in some regions to refer to state pensions, however the term is not legally defined.

Like in Scandinavia, life estates were also granted to noble women as a form of dower. Typically, an estate would be designated for the wife to maintain if she were widowed which her husband was legally prevented from selling without her consent. Ownership of the life estate was to be returned to the remainderman only upon her death, at which point none of her heirs or beneficiaries could make a legal claim to it.

== See also ==
- Interest in possession trust
- Life annuity
- Reverse mortgage
- Tontine
