= Collective action in the United Kingdom =

Collective action in the United Kingdom including the right to strike in UK labour law is the main support for collective bargaining. Although the right to strike (or "industrial action" traditionally) has attained the status, since 1906, of a fundamental human right, protected in domestic case law, statute, the European Convention on Human Rights and international law, the rules in statute have generated significant litigation. The "right of workers to engage in a strike or other industrial action" is expressly recognised in the Trade Union and Labour Relations (Consolidation) Act 1992 section 180, and has been recognised repeatedly by the Court of Appeal as "a fundamental human right"., and the House of Lords (now Supreme Court).

However, UK law has become "the most restrictive on trade unions in the Western world", through a series of rule changes from 1979. In order for a group of workers to take strike action, they must,

- hold a ballot of the workforce who will go on strike;
- inform the employer of the timing and duration of the strike;
- not conduct the industrial action for a purpose unrelated to terms and conditions of the workers' employment contract;
- not take industrial action against anyone but the employer of the affected workers;
- remain peaceful when conducting picket lines.

If those rules are breached, a trade union will be liable for damages to the employer for the cost of the industrial action, an injunction may be issued against the industrial action going ahead, and workers may be fired even for a good faith trade dispute. The rules on industrial action in the UK have been subject to heavy criticism from the International Labour Organization and led to violations in the European Court of Human Rights.

== History ==
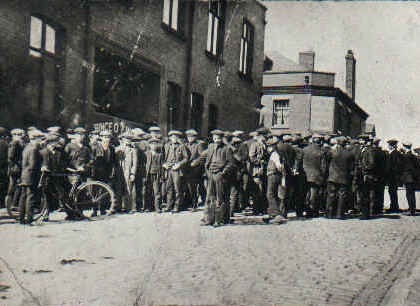
Strikers gathering in Tyldesley in the 1926 General Strike in the UK

The right of workers to collectively withdraw their labour has always been used to make employers stick to a collective agreement. At critical moments of history, it also combatted political repression (e.g. the Indian Independence Movement up to 1947), prevented military coups against democratic governments (e.g. the general strike in Germany against the Kapp Putsch in 1920) and forced governments to abandon unpopular policies (e.g. the Ulster Workers' Council strike). Anti-democratic regimes cannot tolerate social organisation they do not control, which is why the right to strike is fundamental to every democratic society, and a recognised human right in international law. Historically, the UK recognised the right to strike in statute at least since 1906. and there was widespread support at common law back into the 19th century.

Historically common law judges, like international law today, argued the right to stop work in a good faith trade dispute was an implied term in every employment contract. On the other hand, differently composed courts have asserted that the common law position sits at odds with international law: that a strike is a breach of contract, and this creates tortious liability for unions organising collective action, unless it falls within an immunity from statute. On this view, even though an employer is not liable for economic loss to workers who are collectively dismissed, a union could be liable to the employer for taking collective action. Economic torts have been said to include conspiracy to injure, inducement of breach of contract, and tortious interference with a contract.

The Conspiracy and Protection of Property Act 1875, repeated in the Trade Disputes Act 1906 after the Taff Vale case created the "golden formula" that collective action by a trade union becomes immune from any liability in tort if done "in contemplation or furtherance of a trade dispute". UK tradition inspired the International Labour Organization Convention 87 (1948) articles 3 and 10, the case law of the European Court of Human Rights under article 11, and the EU Charter of Fundamental Rights article 28. However, the scope of the right to take collective action has been controversial. Reflecting a series of restrictions from 1979 to 1997, the law was partially codified in the Trade Union and Labour Relations (Consolidation) Act 1992 sections 219 to 246, which now falls below international standards.

- Economic tort
- Taff Vale Rly Co v Amalgamated Society of Rly Servants [1901] UKHL 1
- Quinn v Leathem [1901] UKHL 2
- South Wales Miners' Federation v Glamorgan Coal Co [1905] AC 239
- Trade Disputes Act 1906
- Torquay Hotels Ltd v Cousins [1968]
- Rookes v Barnard [1964] AC 1129, [1964] UKHL 1

== Right to strike ==
The Trade Union and Labour Relations (Consolidation) Act 1992 section 180 expressly recognises "the right of workers to engage in a strike or other industrial action", and section 219 contains the classic formula that collective action by a trade union becomes immune from any liability in tort if done "in contemplation or furtherance of a trade dispute". This said, various further hurdles must be jumped for a union to be certain of immunity from employers suing for damages, or an injunction to stop a strike.

The meaning of a "trade dispute" under TULRCA 1992 section 244 is confined to mean a dispute "between workers and their employer" and must mainly relate to employment terms. In BBC v Hearn Lord Denning MR granted an injunction against a strike by BBC staff to stop broadcast of the 1977 FA Cup Final to apartheid South Africa. He reasoned that this was a political dispute, not a "trade dispute", unless the union was requesting "putting a clause in the contract" to not do such work. Strikes against government legislation (rather than an employer), or privatisation, or outsourcing before it happens, have been held unlawful. However, at the least, any dispute over the terms or conditions on which workers do their jobs will allow protection.

- In re P [2003] UKHL 8
- Demir and Baykara v Turkey [2008] ECHR 1345
- Industrial Relations Act 1971, repealed by Trade Union and Labour Relations Act 1974, amended by Employment Act 1982

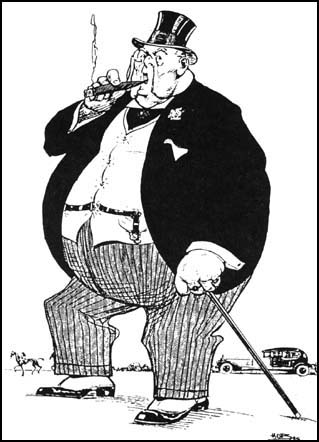
"The Subsidised Mineowner – Poor Beggar!", Trade Union Unity Magazine (1925)

- 1926 United Kingdom general strike

=== Economic torts and common law ===
- Lumley v Gye (1853) 2 E. & B. 216
- Allen v Flood [1898] AC 1
- Taff Vale Railway Co v Amalgamated Society of Railway Servants [1901] AC 426,
- Quinn v Leatham [1901] AC 495
- South Wales Miners' Federation v Glamorgan Coal Co [1905] AC 239
- Hill v CA Parsons & Co [1972] where the cause of the dispute was a union attempting to enforce a closed shop

Common law right?

- Crofter Hand Woven Harris Tweed v Veitch [1942] AC 435
- Morgan v Fry [1968] 2 QB 710, Lord Denning MR says there has been a right to strike in the UK for over 60 years provided proper notice is given
- London Underground Ltd v RMT [1996] ICR 170

Immunity

- Trade Disputes Act 1906 and TULRCA 1992 s 219
- Stratford (JT) & Son Ltd v Lindley [1965] AC 269
- Rookes v Barnard [1964] AC 1129
- Torquay Hotel Co Ltd v Cousins [1969] 2 Ch 106
- Merkur Island Shipping Corporation v Laughton [1983] 2 AC 570
- Barretts & Baird (Wholesale) Ltd v IPCS [1987] IRLR 3
- Falconer v NUR [1986] IRLR 331, rail passenger gets £173 damages for strike without ballot
- TULRCA 1992 s 244, meaning of trade dispute
- Express Newspapers Ltd v Keys [1980] IRLR 247
- BBC v Hearn [1977] 1 WLR 1004
- Dimbleby & Sons Ltd v NUJ [1984] ICR 386, corporate veil precludes strikes against parent
- Mercury Communications Ltd v Scott-Garner [1984] Ch 37, no strike against potential takeover bidder
- University College London Hospitals NHS Trust v UNISON [1999] ICR 204, no strike against privatisation policy

=== International law and European Convention ===
- Wilson and Palmer v United Kingdom [2002] IRLR 568 in the EHCR
- British Airways plc v Unite the Union (No 2) [2010] IRLR 809

== Secondary action and company groups ==
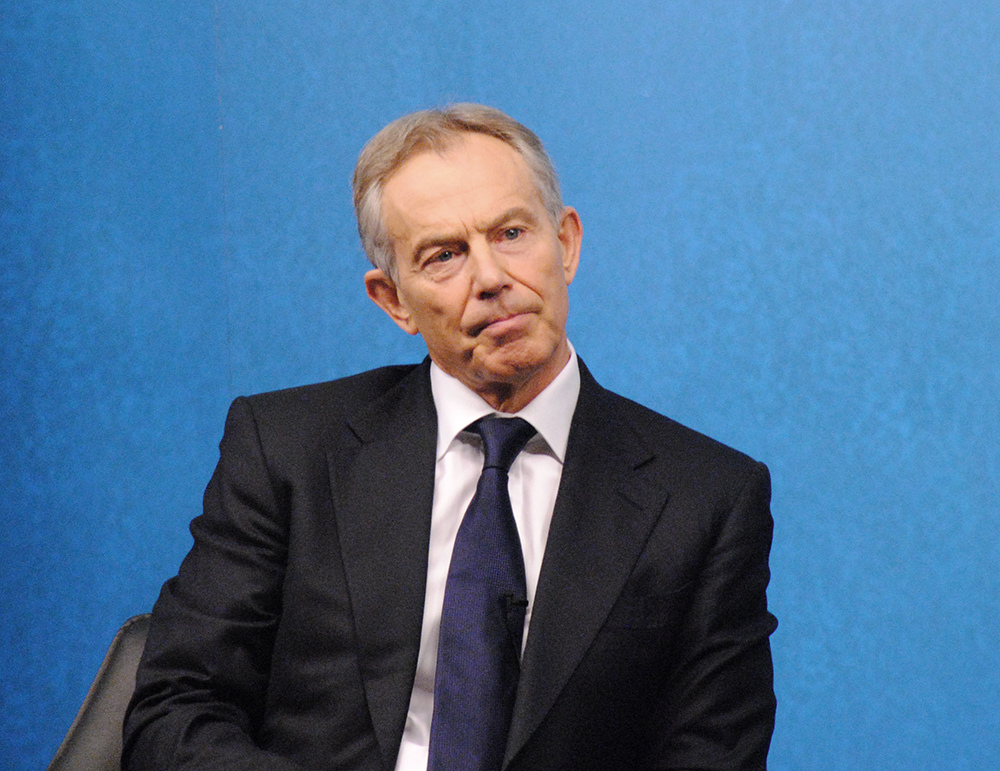
Tony Blair, New Labour Prime Minister from 1997 to 2007, said in 1997 that "changes that we do propose would leave British law the most restrictive on trade unions in the Western world." This is still seen as accurate.

The Trade Union and Labour Relations (Consolidation) Act 1992 section 224 prevents collective action against someone who is "not the employer party to the dispute". "Secondary action" used to be lawful, from the Trade Union Act 1871 until 1927, and again from 1946 till 1980, but today it is not. This makes the definition of "employer" relevant, particularly where a trade dispute involves a company group. A worker's written statement of the contract may purport to say that the only "employer" is a subsidiary, although the parent company carries out the employer's function of ultimately setting the contractual terms and conditions.

- Conway v Wade [1909] AC 506, judicial approval of secondary action
- DC Thomson & Co Ltd v Deakin [1952] Ch 646
- Duport Steels Ltd v Sirs [1980] ICR 161, secondary action capable of legitimacy
- TULRCA 1992 s 222, no closed shop strikes
- TULRCA 1992 s 223, no strikes to support unlawful strikes

== Balloting ==
Under TULRCA 1992 section 226 a union wishing to take collective action for a trade dispute must conduct a ballot. In summary, the union must give 7 days notice to the employer about holding a ballot, state the categories of employees being balloted, give a total number, all "as accurate as is reasonably practicable in the light of the information". Since the Trade Union Act 2016, there is an additional requirement that a ballot has a 50% turnout for a strike to be supported, and a total of 40% of voters supporting a strike (i.e. an 80% turnout if the vote is evenly split) in "important public services" that include health services, schools, fire, transport, nuclear and border security. A scrutineer must be able to oversee the conduct, the vote must be given to all workers who could strike, the vote must be secret and by post, allowing for 'small accidental failures' which are 'unlikely to affect the result of the ballot'.

The union must inform the employer of the result "as soon as reasonably practicable", call action within four weeks, and tell the employer of the people taking part. The rules are poorly drafted, and this has generated litigation where some courts allowed injunctions on ostensible technical glitches. However, the Court of Appeal since emphasised in British Airways Plc v Unite the Union (No 2) and RMT v Serco Ltd that the rules are to be interpreted consistently with the purpose of reconciling the equally legitimate, but conflicting interests of employers and unions. No employee can be dismissed for taking part in a strike for a period of 12 weeks, so long as the strike is officially endorsed by the union.

- RMT v London Underground Ltd [2001] IRLR 228, notice to employer
- RJB Mining (UK) Ltd v NUM [1995] IRLR 813
- Monsanto plc v TGWU [1987] ICR 269, new ballot not needed when strike suspending to let negotiations continue, a "matter of fact and degree"

== Picketing ==
Any picketing or protest outside a workplace must be "peaceful" and there must be a picket supervisor. There are a limited number of outright prohibitions on strike action, but in accordance with ILO Convention 87 this is only for workplaces that involve the truly essential functions of the state (for armed forces, police, and prison officers), and only when impartial arbitration is used as an alternative.

- TULRCA 1992 s 241, immunity from various torts
- Highways Act 1980 s 137, Public Order Act 1986 s 14, Police and Criminal Evidence Act 1986 s 25, Police Act 1996 s 89, Conspiracy, and Protection of Property Act 1875 s 7
- Rayware LTD v TGWU [1989] ICR 457
- Mersey Dock & Harbour Co v Verrinder [1982] IRLR 152, picket against drivers reaching docks an improper purpose
- Broome v DPP [1974] AC 587, standing in road not persuasion but compulsion under HA 1980 s 137
- Piddington v Bates [1961] 1 WLR 162, police judgment about picket numbers is subjective
- Moss v McLachlan [1985] IRLR 76, police can block roads to pickets to preserve peace

== Injunctions ==
If strikes are not conducted in accordance with law, employers can (and often do) go to court to seek an injunction against a union conducting the strike, or potentially damages. A court should not grant any injunction against a strike unless there is a 'serious question to be tried' and it must consider where the 'balance of convenience lies'. In The Nawala the House of Lords stressed that injunctions should be granted rarely and give 'full weight to all the practical realities' and the fact that a court should not end the strike in the employer's favour.

- TULRCA 1992 s 221, injunctions
- Richard Read v NUM
- Boxfoldia
- P&O v Byrne

== See also ==
- UK labour law
- Trades Union Congress
