= Collymore v Attorney General =

1969 UK labour law case

- Court: UK Privy Council
- Citation: [1969] UKPC 11

Keywords
- Health

Collymore v Attorney General [1969] UKPC 11 is a case of the Privy Council relevant for UK labour law, concerning the right to strike.

== Facts ==
Collymore and other trade union members for oil companies claimed that a new Industrial Stabilisation Act 1965 in Trinidad and Tobago was ultra vires the constitution, which guaranteed freedom of association. The Act required no strikes pending binding arbitration.

== Judgment ==
The Privy Council advised that the Act did not breach the Constitution. Lord Donovan said the following:

The question thus posed is therefore simply a question of construction. But the arguments presented for the appellants, based on the assertion that the right to free collective bargaining and the right to strike are essential elements in freedom of association in trade unions, led to a prolonged examination in the courts below as to whether there is in law any "right" to strike. The question does not really arise if the respondent's contention as above summarised is right: for if "freedom of association" does not of itself import freedom to bargain collectively and to do so effectively by means of a strike, it is immaterial whether strike action is or is not the exercise of a "right" or a "freedom" or the enjoyment of "an immunity." Since, however, the matter was exhaustively canvassed in the courts below, their Lordships may say that they are in substantial agreement with the analysis of the situation which emerged. It was agreed before their Lordships that trade union law in Trinidad and Tobago was the same as trade union law in Great Britain as at the date when the Trade Disputes Act, 1906, took effect. Neither before that date nor since has there been in Great Britain any express enactment by statute of any right to strike, although in certain quarters such an enactment is still advocated. At common law before the enactment of the Trade Union Act 1871, the Conspiracy and Protection of Property Act 1875, and the amendment to section 3 thereof effected by section 1 of the Trade Disputes Act 1906, combinations of workmen to improve their wages and conditions were certainly in peril if in combination they withheld their labour or threatened to do so: but (subject to certain esoteric questions arising out of the decision in Rookes v Barnard [1964] AC 1129 and still unresolved by the Trade Disputes Act 1965) it is now well recognised that by reason of the statutes cited, as well as by decisions such as Crofter Hand Woven Harris Tweed Co Ltd v Veitch [1942] AC 435 employees may lawfully withhold their labour in combination free from the restrictions and penalties which the common law formerly imposed. In this sense there is "freedom to strike."

== See also ==
- United Kingdom labour law

== General and cited references ==
Ultra vires doctrin

Supremacy of the constitution

Rule of Law

Separation of Powers
