= Economic torts in English law =

Economic torts in English law refer to a species of civil wrong which protects the economic wealth that a person will gain in the ordinary course of business. Proving compensation for pure economic loss, examples of an economic tort include interference with economic or business relationships.

== Overview ==
Economic torts protect people from interference with their trade or business. The area includes the doctrine of restraint of trade and has largely been submerged in the twentieth century by statutory interventions on collective labour law, modern antitrust or competition law, and certain laws governing intellectual property, particularly unfair competition law. Markesinis' and Deakin's text book on tort law notes that "the absence of any unifying principle drawing together the different heads of economic tort liability has often been remarked upon."

The principal torts can be listed as passing off, injurious falsehood and trade libel (see also Food libel laws), conspiracy, inducement of breach of contract, tortious interference (such as interference with economic relations or unlawful interference with trade), and watching and besetting. These torts represent the common law's historical attempt to balance the need to protect claimants against those who inflict economic harm and the wider need to allow effective, even aggressive, competition (including competition between employers and their workers).

Two cases demonstrated economic tort's affinity to competition and labour law. In Mogul Steamship Co Ltd v McGregor, Gow & Co the plaintiffs argued they had been driven from the Chinese tea market by a 'shipping conference', that had acted together to underprice them. But this cartel was ruled lawful and "nothing more [than] a war of competition waged in the interest of their own trade." Nowadays, this would be considered a criminal cartel.

== Workplace relations ==
In English labour law the most notable case is Taff Vale Railway v Amalgamated Society of Railway Servants. The House of Lords ruled that trade unions should be liable in tort for helping workers to go on strike for better pay and conditions. But this ruling riled workers so much that it led to the creation of the British Labour Party and passing of the Trade Disputes Act 1906. Further torts used against unions include conspiracy, interference with a commercial contract, and intimidation.

== Inducing breach of contract ==
Several of the economic torts in English law, in particular inducing breach of contract and "tortious interference" (otherwise known as causing loss by unlawful means), have been reviewed and clarified by the House of Lords in the 2007 case of OBG v Allan.

- Lumley v Gye (1853) 2 E & B 216
- Glamorgan Coal Company v South Wales Miners Federation [1903] 2 KB 545, Romer LJ, “I think that regard might be had to the nature of the contract broken; the position of the parties to the contract; the grounds for the breach; the means employed to procure the breach; the relation of the person procuring the breach to the person who breaks the contract; and I think also to the object of the person in procuring the breach.” Lord James, [1905] AC 238 at 252 “The fact that their motives were good in the interests of those they moved to action does not form any answer to those who have suffered from the unlawful act.”

On the above case, at appeal:

- South Wales Miners’ Federation v Glamorgan Coal Co Ltd [1905] AC 239, “It would be idle to sue the workmen, the individual wrong-doers, even if it were practicable to do so. Their counsellors and protectors, the real authors of the mischief, would be safe from legal proceedings.”
- Quinn v Leathem [1901] AC 495, at 510, Lord Macnaghten: “a violation of legal right committed knowingly is a cause of action ... it is a violation of a right to interfere with contractual relations recognised by law if there be no sufficient justification for the interference.”
- Brimelow v Casson [1924] 1 Ch 302: whether grounds of morality were relevant to the inducement.
- Douglas v Hello! Ltd (No 3) [2005] EWCA Civ 595
- Mainstream Properties v Young [2005] EWCA Civ 861
- Emerald Construction v Lowthian [1966] 1 WLR 691, Lord Denning MR, “if the officers deliberately sought to get this contract terminated, heedless of its terms, regardless whether it was terminated by breach or not, they would do wrong.”
- Camden Nominees v Forcey [1940] Ch 352
- British Motor Trade Association v Salvadori [1949] Ch 556, Roxburgh J, “in my judgment, any active step taken by a defendant, having knowledge of the covenant, by which he facilitates a breach of covenant is enough.”
- Merkur Island Shipping v Laughton [1983] 2 AC 570, Lord Diplock, "all prevention of due performance of a primary obligation ... even though no secondary obligation to make monetary compensation thereupon came into existence."
- Torquay Hotel Co v Cousins [1969] 2 Ch 106
- Millar v Bassey [1994] Entertainment & Media LR 44
- Edwin Hill v First National [1988] 3 All ER 801

== See also ==
- Trade Disputes Act 1906
- Trade Union and Labour Relations (Consolidation) Act 1992
