= Breach of confidence =

The tort of breach of confidence is, in United Kingdom law and United States law, a common-law tort that protects private information conveyed in confidence. A claim for breach of confidence typically requires the information to be of a confidential nature, communicated in confidence and disclosed to the detriment of the claimant.

Establishing a breach of confidentiality depends on proving the existence and breach of a duty of confidentiality. Courts in the United States look at the nature of the relationship between the parties. Most commonly, breach of confidentiality applies to the patient-physician relationship, but it can also apply to relationships involving banks, hospitals, insurance companies, and many others.

There was no clear tort of breach of confidence in other common-law jurisdictions such as the United Kingdom or Australia; however, there is an equitable doctrine of breach of confidence. In OBG Ltd v Allan [2007] UKHL 21 the Law Lords clarified that Economic torts in English law do exist.

== See also ==
- Abuse of information
- Misuse of private information
- Breach of confidence in English law
- United States free speech exceptions
