= AI Enterprises Ltd v Bram Enterprises Ltd =

- Supreme Court of Canada

Hearing: May 22, 2013 Judgment: January 31, 2014
- Full case name: A.I. Enterprises Ltd. and Alan Schelew v. Bram Enterprises Ltd. and Jamb Enterprises Ltd.
- Citations: 2014 SCC 12
- Docket No.: 34863
- Prior history: APPEAL from A.I. Enterprises and Schelew v. Bram Enterprises and Jamb Enterprises, 2012 NBCA 33 (12 April 2012), affirming 2010 NBQB 245 (July 22, 2010; unreported)
- Ruling: Appeal dismissed.

Holding
- While A.I. and A cannot be found liable to Bram and Jamb on the basis of the unlawful means tort, the trial judge made strong findings that A breached his fiduciary obligations as a director of the family companies and the trial judge's award should be upheld on that basis.

Court membership
- Chief Justice: Beverley McLachlin; Puisne Justices: Louis LeBel, Marie Deschamps, Morris Fish, Rosalie Abella, Marshall Rothstein, Thomas Cromwell, Michael Moldaver, Andromache Karakatsanis, Richard Wagner

Reasons given
- Unanimous reasons by: Cromwell J.
- Abella and Moldaver JJ. took no part in the consideration or decision of the case.

AI Enterprises Ltd v Bram Enterprises Ltd, 2014 SCC 12 was a unanimous decision of the Supreme Court of Canada that standardized Canadian jurisprudence with respect to the economic tort of unlawful means.

== Background ==
Lillian Schelew and her sons, Jeffrey, Michael, Bernard and Alan, owned a company named Joyce Avenue Apartments Ltd which was in possession of an apartment building in Moncton, New Brunswick. The four sons owned eighty percent of Joyce, equally divided via two corporate entities, the respondent Bram Enterprises Ltd. and Jamb Enterprises Ltd. The remaining twenty percent fell to the appellant, A.I. Enterprises Ltd., owned and directed by Alan Schelew. Joyce, Bram, Jamb and A.I. signed a syndication agreement whereby the majority of investors were granted the right of sale, subject to a right of first refusal by any minority investor to purchase the apartment at a professionally appraised price. The terms of the syndication agreement limited the irreversible offer of sale to a fifteen-day window.

In 2000, Bram and Jamb wished to sell the apartment, at that time valued at $2.2 million, but A.I. and Alan Schelew declined to purchase it. Bram and Jamb attempted to sell the property to multiple buyers but were unsuccessful. Two years later, A.I. purchased the apartment for $2.2 million.

Bram and Jamb then sued A.I. for causing loss by unlawful means. They alleged that, due to A.I. and Alan's conduct, the sale had been delayed and at a lesser price than they could have received from a third-party buyer. Bram and Jamb claimed that A.I. and Alan had broken the terms of the syndication agreement, that Alan had breached his fiduciary duty as a joint director of the respondent corporate entities, and that the A.I. and Alan had unlawfully interfered with their economic relations.

== The courts below ==
At the Court of Queen's Bench of New Brunswick, the trial judge focused on four of the appellants' acts:

- they misused the arbitration provisions of the Syndication Agreement as a means of stalling the sale of the Joyce property;
- they advanced legally groundless defences for a "Notice of its first right of refusal" which they had filed against the Joyce property;
- they subsequently filed an equally baseless certificate of pending litigation against the property; and
- they denied entry to the Joyce property to prospective buyers.

In the trial judge's view, all of this conduct was unlawful because it lacked any legal basis or justification. He found that Schelew's conduct in obstructing the sale also breached his fiduciary obligations as director of Bram and Jamb and that A.I. had breached its obligations towards Bram and Jamb under the Syndication Agreement.

The trial judge's decision was affirmed on appeal. At trial, neither side had referred to the recent case of OBG Ltd v Allan that had been decided in the House of Lords. Its merits were argued at the Court of Appeal of New Brunswick, which opted to prefer the more narrow reasoning that was expressed by Lord Hoffmann in it for a narrow definition of "unlawful means" whereby only breaches of the civil law such as a tort or breach of contract would suffice. It did, however, allow for principled exceptions to mitigate the rigidity of the narrow rule and crafted an exception, which covered this case, in the following terms:

In my view, the intentional erection of self-help legal barriers, some of which are enforceable through statutory processes not subject to prior judicial authorization, in circumstances where those barriers rest on rights fabricated with arguments of sand, warrants redress under the tort of unlawful means (akin to the tort of abuse of legal process).

== At the Supreme Court ==
The appeal was dismissed, Cromwell J., writing for a unanimous Court, noted that the Court had previously addressed the issue only once before, at that time favouring a narrow construction of the tort. In the present case, it concluded that:

1. Liability to the plaintiff is based on (or parasitic upon) the defendant's unlawful act against the third party. The two core components of the unlawful means tort are that the defendant must use unlawful means and that the defendant must intend to harm the plaintiff through the use of the unlawful means.
2. In order for conduct to constitute "unlawful means" for this tort, the conduct must give rise to a civil cause of action by the third party or would do so if the third party had suffered loss as a result of that conduct. The unlawful means tort should be kept within narrow bounds, and it is not subject to principled exceptions.
3. The defendant must have the intention to cause economic harm to the plaintiff as an end in itself or the intention to cause economic harm to the plaintiff because it is a necessary means of achieving an end that serves some ulterior motive.
4. The focus of this tort is unlawful conduct that intentionally harms the plaintiff's economic interests. There need be no contract or even other formal dealings between the plaintiff and the third party so long as the defendant's conduct is unlawful and it intentionally harms the plaintiff's economic interests.
5. The tort of unlawful means is available even if there is another cause of action available to the plaintiff against the defendant in relation to the alleged misconduct.

Therefore, the tort of unlawful means was found not to be made out in this case, but Schelew was nevertheless found liable because he had breached his fiduciary obligations as a director of the family companies.

== Impact ==
The Court also noted that the Civil Code of Quebec goes farther than the common law's unlawful means tort, where liability may be imposed on the defendant for conduct which is otherwise lawful but which is done with the intent to injure the plaintiff or in a manner inconsistent with the social ends of that right. In such cases, the appellants' conduct may have been found to fall within the liability's scope in Quebec.
