= South Wales Miners' Federation v Glamorgan Coal Co =

- Court: House of Lords
- Citation: [1905] AC 239
- Transcript: judgment

South Wales Miners' Federation v Glamorgan Coal Co. [1905] AC 239 is an old UK labour law case, and part of an infamous three tort cases that imposed liability on trade unions for going on strike.

== Facts ==
Miners employed in collieries without giving notice to their employers and in breach of their contracts abstained from working on certain days upon the direction or order of a federation of the miners given by their executive council. The federation and council acted honestly without malice or ill-will towards the employers, and with the object only of keeping up the price of coal by which the wages were regulated.

At the time coal prices were in decline.

== Judgment ==
The House of Lords held that it was no defence to an action for inducing breach of contract that the conduct of the defendants was dictated by an honest desire to promote the interests of trade union members and not to injure the employer.

== Overturning ==
- Trade Disputes Act 1906
- Crofter Hand Woven Harris Tweed v Veitch [1942] AC 435 right to take part in collective bargaining by Lord Wright
- Wilson and Palmer v United Kingdom [2002] ECHR, right to take action in defence of union members interests follows from the freedom of association in Art.11 ECHR

== See also ==
- Taff Vale Railway Co v Amalgamated Society of Railway Servants [1901] AC 426
- Quinn v Leatham
