= Mogul Steamship Co Ltd v McGregor, Gow & Co =

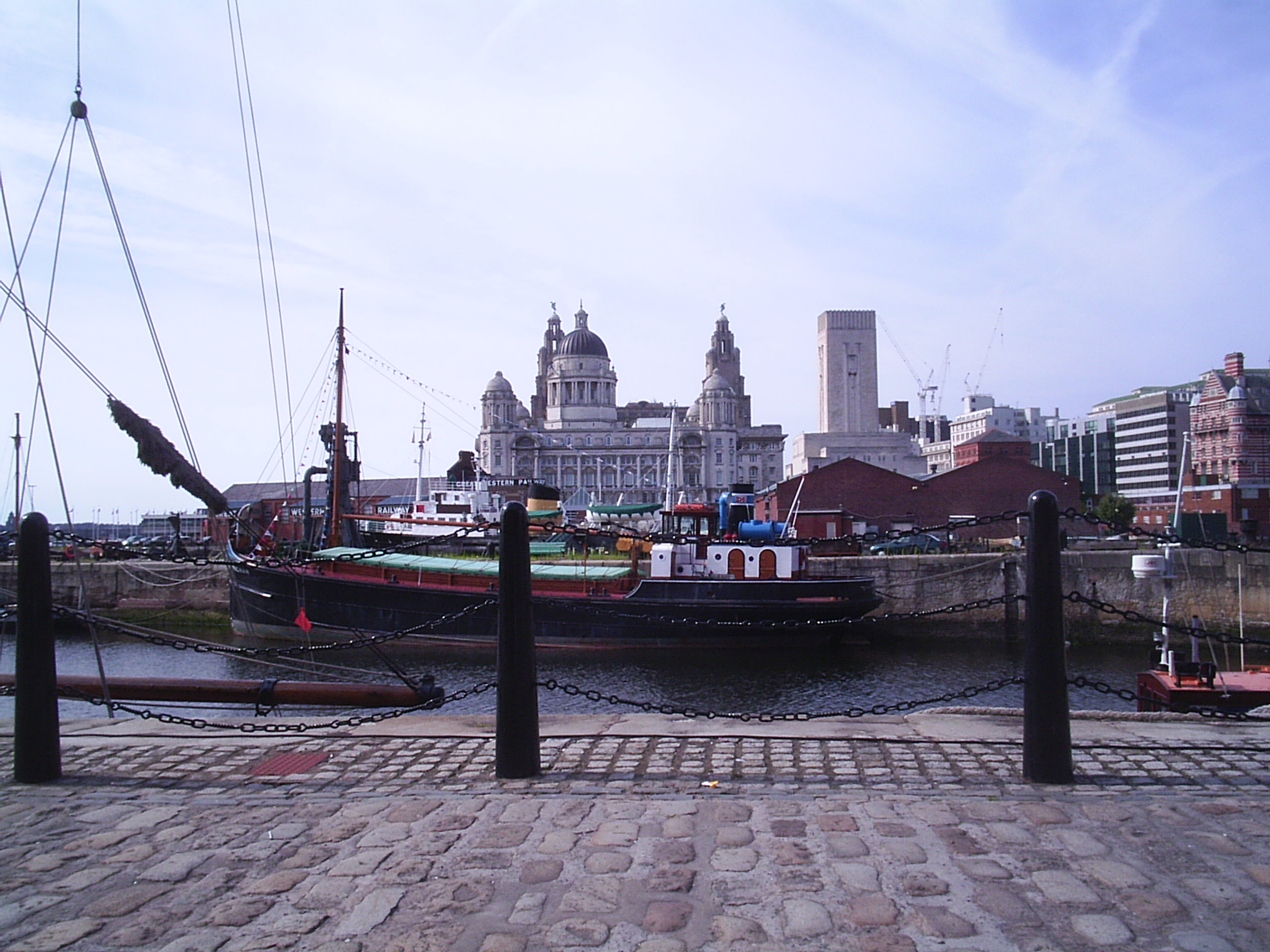
- Court: House of Lords
- Citation: [1892] AC 25

Case history
- Prior action: (1889) 23 QBD 598, (1888) LR 21 QBD 544

Court membership
- Judges sitting: Lord Halsbury LC, Lord Watson, Lord Macnaghten, Lord Bramwell, Lord Morris, Lord Field, Lord Hannen

Keywords
- Conspiracy to injure, economic tort

Mogul Steamship Co Ltd v McGregor, Gow & Co [1892] AC 25 is an English tort law case concerning the economic tort of conspiracy to injure. A product of its time, the courts adhered to a laissez faire doctrine allowing firms to form a cartel, which would now be seen as contrary to the Competition Act 1998.

It is notable for Lord Bramwell's dictum that:

There is one thing that is to me decisive. I have always said that a combination of workmen, an agreement among them to cease work except for higher wages, and a strike in consequence, was lawful at common law; perhaps not enforceable inter se, but not indictable. The legislature has now so declared.

== Facts ==
A group of ship owners formed an association (the Far Eastern Freight Conference) to raise their profits. The association agreed to limit the number of ships sent by the association to different ports, to give a 5% rebate on freights to all shippers of stock who dealt only with members, and that agents of members would be prohibited from dealing with anyone in the association if they did not deal exclusively with people in the association. If any member wished to withdraw, they would have to give notice. Mogul Steamship Co Ltd had been excluded. When it sent ships to the loading port to pick up cargo, the association sent more ships and underbid Mogul Steamship Co Ltd. The association also threatened to dismiss agents or withdraw rebates from anyone who dealt with Mogul Steamship Co Ltd. Mogul Steamship Co Ltd alleged there was a conspiracy to injure its economic interests and sued for compensation.

== Judgment ==
=== Court of Appeal ===
The Court of Appeal held by a majority that the action taken was lawful. Lord Esher MR dissented, and Bowen LJ and Fry LJ formed the majority. Bowen LJ noted the following.

We are presented in this case with an apparent conflict or antinomy between two rights that are especially regarded by the law: the right of the plaintiffs to be protected in the legitimate exercise of their trade, and the right of the defendants to carry on their business as seems best to them, provided they commit no wrong to others.

[...]

[The] right to trade freely is a right that the law recognises and encourages but it is one which places him at no special advantage as compared with others. No man, whether trader or not, can, however, justify damaging another in his commercial business by fraud or misrepresentation. Intimidation, obstruction and molestation are forbidden; so is the intentional procurement or violation of individual rights, contractual or other, assuming always that there is no just cause for it... [but] the defendants have been guilty of none of these acts. They have done nothing more against the plaintiffs than pursue to the bitter end a war of competition waged in the interest of their own trade.

=== House of Lords ===
The House of Lords, affirming the Court of Appeal's decision, held that the acts were done with a lawful object of protecting and increasing the associations profits. Because no unlawful means had been employed, Mogul Steamship Co Ltd had no cause of action.

Lord Bramwell's judgment read as follows.

My Lords, the plaintiffs in this case do not complain of any trespass, violence, force, fraud, or breach of contract, nor of any direct tort or violation of any right of the plaintiffs, like the case of firing to frighten birds from a decoy; nor of any act, the ultimate object of which was to injure the plaintiffs, having its origin in malice or ill-will to them. The plaintiffs admit that materially and morally they have been at liberty to do their best for themselves without any impediment by the defendants. But they say that the defendants have entered into an agreement in restraint of trade; an agreement, therefore, unlawful; an agreement, therefore, indictable, punishable; that the defendants have acted in conformity with that unlawful agreement, and thereby caused damage to the plaintiffs in respect of which they are entitled to bring, and bring this action.

The plaintiffs also say that these things, or some of them, if done by an individual, would be actionable. This need not be determined directly, because all the things complained of have their origin in what the plaintiffs say is unlawfulness, a conspiracy to injure; so that if actionable when done by one, much more are they when done by several, and if not actionable when done by several, certainly they are not when done by one. It has been objected by capable persons, that it is strange that that should be unlawful if done by several which is not if done by one, and that the thing is wrong if done by one, if wrong when done by several; if not wrong when done by one, it cannot be when done by several. I think there is an obvious answer, indeed two; one is, that a man may encounter the acts of a single person, yet not be fairly matched against several. The other is, that the act when done by an individual is wrong though not punishable, because the law avoids the multiplicity of crimes: de minimis non curat lex; while if done by several it is sufficiently important to be treated as a crime. Let it be, then, that it is no answer to the plaintiffs' complaint that if what they complain of had been done by an individual there would be no cause of action. There is the further question whether there is a cause of action, the acts being done by several.

The first position of the plaintiffs is that the agreement among the defendants is illegal as being in restraint of trade, and therefore against public policy, and so illegal. “Public policy,” said Burrough J. (I believe, quoting Hobart C.J.), “is an unruly horse, and dangerous to ride”. I quote also another distinguished judge, more modern, Cave J.: “Certain kinds of contracts have been held void at Common Law on the ground of public policy; a branch of the law, however, which certainly should not be extended, as judges are more to be trusted as interpreters of the law than as expounders of what is called public policy”. I think the present case is an illustration of the wisdom of these remarks. I venture to make another. No evidence is given in these public policy cases. The tribunal is to say, as matter of law, that the thing is against public policy, and void. How can the judge do that without any evidence as to its effect and consequences? If the shipping in this case was sufficient for the trade, a further supply would have been a waste. There are some people who think that the public is not concerned with this—people who would make a second railway by the side of one existing, saying “only the two companies will suffer,” as though the wealth of the community was not made up of the wealth of the individuals who compose it. I am by no means sure that the conference did not prevent a waste, and was not good for the public. Lord Coleridge thought it was—see his judgment.

As to the suggestion that the Chinese profited by the lowering of freights, I cannot say it was not so. There may have been a monopoly or other cause to give them a benefit; but, as a rule, it is clear that the expense of transit, and all other expenses, borne by an exported article that has a market price, are borne by the importer, therefore, ultimately, by the consumer. So that low freights benefit him. To go on with the case, take it that the defendants had bound themselves to each other; I think they had, though they might withdraw. Let it be that each member had tied his hands; let it be that that was in restraint of trade; I think upon the authority of Hilton v. Eckersley, and other cases, we should hold that the agreement was illegal, that is, not enforceable by law. I will assume, then, that it was, though I am not quite sure. But that is not enough for the plaintiffs. To maintain their action on this ground they must make out that it was an offence, a crime, a misdemeanour. I am clearly of opinion it was not. Save the opinion of Crompton J. (entitled to the greatest respect, but not assented to by Lord Campbell or the Exchequer Chamber), there is no authority for it in the English law.

It is quite certain that an agreement may be void, yet the parties to it not punishable. Take the case I put during the argument: a man and woman agree to live together as man and wife, without marrying. The agreement is illegal, and could not be enforced, but clearly the parties to it would not be indictable. It ought to be enough to say that the fact that there is no case where there has been a conviction for such an offence as is alleged against the defendants is conclusive.

It is to be remembered that it is for the plaintiffs to make out the case that the defendants have committed an indictable offence, not for the defendants to disprove it. There needs no argument to prove the negative. There are some observations to be made. It is admitted that there may be fair competition in trade, that two may offer to join and compete against a third. If so, what is the definition of “fair competition”? What is unfair that is neither forcible nor fraudulent? It does seem strange that to enforce freedom of trade, of action, the law should punish those who make a perfectly honest agreement with a belief that it is fairly required for their protection.

There is one thing that is to me decisive. I have always said that a combination of workmen, an agreement among them to cease work except for higher wages, and a strike in consequence, was lawful at common law; perhaps not enforceable inter se, but not indictable. The Legislature has now so declared. The enactment is express, that agreements among workmen shall be binding, whether they would or would not, but for the Acts, have been deemed unlawful, as in restraint of trade. Is it supposable that it would have done so in the way it has, had the workmen's combination been a punishable misdemeanour? Impossible. This seems to me conclusive, that though agreements which fetter the freedom of action in the parties to it may not be enforceable, they are not indictable. See also the judgment of Fry L.J. on this point. Where is such a contention to stop? Suppose the case put in the argument: In a small town there are two shops, sufficient for the wants of the neighbourhood, making only a reasonable profit. They are threatened with a third. The two shopkeepers agree to warn the intending shopkeeper that if he comes they will lower prices, and can afford it longer than he. Have they committed an indictable offence? Remember the conspiracy is the offence, and they have conspired. If he, being warned, does not set up his shop, has he a cause of action? He might prove damages. He might shew that from his skill he would have beaten one or both of the others. See in this case the judgment of Lord Esher, that the plaintiffs might recover for “damages at large for future years.” Would a shipowner who had intended to send his ship to Shanghai, but desisted owing to the defendants' agreement, and on being told by them they would deal with him as they had with the plaintiffs, be entitled to maintain an action against the defendants? Why not? If yes, why not every shipowner who could say he had a ship fit for the trade, but was deterred from using it?

The Master of the Rolls cites Sir William Erle, that “a combination to violate a private right in which the public has a sufficient interest is a crime, such violation being an actionable wrong.” True. Sir William Erle means that where the violation of a private right is an actionable wrong, a combination to violate it, if the public has a sufficient interest, is a crime. But in this case, I hold that there is no private right violated. His Lordship further says: “If one goes beyond the exercise of the course of trade, and does an act beyond what is the course of trade, in order—that is to say, with intent—to molest the other's free course of trade, he is not exercising his own freedom of a course of trade, he is not acting in but beyond the course of trade, and then it follows that his act is an unlawful obstruction of the other's right to a free course of trade, and if such obstruction causes damage to the other he is entitled to maintain an action for the wrong”. I may be permitted to say that this is not very plain. I think it means that it is not in the course of trade for one trader to do acts the motive of which is to damage the trade of another. Whether I should agree depends on the meaning to be put on “course of trade” and “molest.” But it is clear that the Master of the Rolls means conduct which would give a cause of action against an individual. He cites Sir William Erle in support of his proposition, who clearly is speaking of acts which would be actionable in an individual, and there is no such act here. The Master of the Rolls says the lowering of the freight far beyond a lowering for any purpose of trade was not an act done in the exercise of their own free right of trade, but for the purpose of interfering with the plaintiffs' right to a free course of trade; therefore a wrongful act as against the plaintiffs' right; and as injury to the plaintiffs followed, they had a right of action. I cannot agree. If there were two shopkeepers in a village and one sold an article at cost price, not for profit therefore, but to attract customers or cause his rival to leave off selling the article only, it could not be said he was liable to an action. I cannot think that the defendants did more than they had a legal right to do. I adopt the vigorous language and opinion of Fry L.J.: “To draw a line between fair and unfair competition, between what is reasonable and unreasonable, passes the power of the courts”. It is a strong thing for the plaintiffs to complain of the very practices they wished to share in, and once did.

== See also ==
- English tort law
- Vegelahn v. Guntner, 167 Mass. 92 (1896)
- Loewe v. Lawlor, 208 U.S. 274 (1908)
- Clayton Act 1914
- History of United States antitrust law
