= Quinn v Leathem =

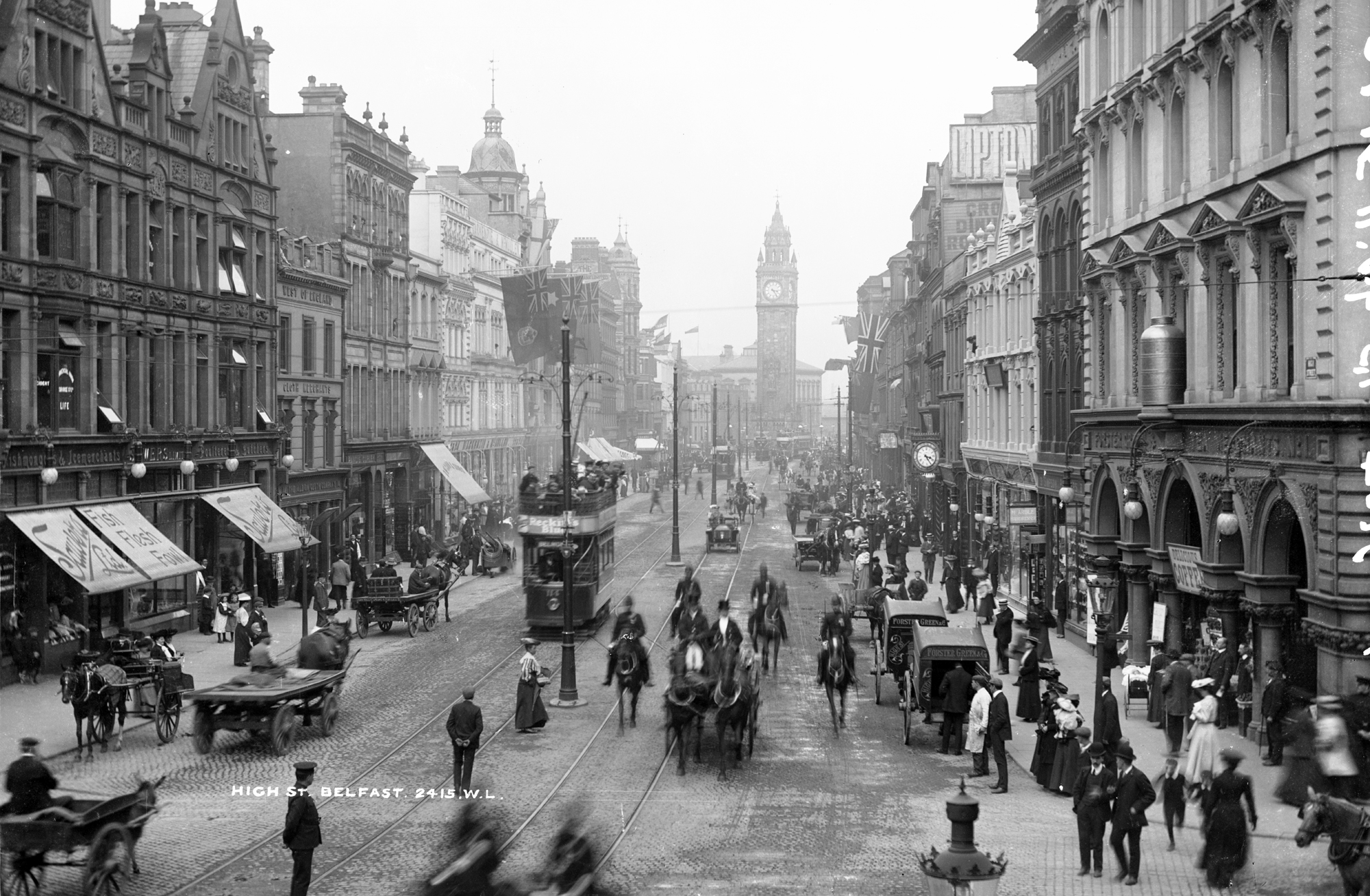
- Court: House of Lords
- Decided: 5 August 1901
- Citation: [1901] AC 495, [1901] UKHL 2

Court membership
- Judges sitting: Lord Shand, Lord Macnaghten, Lord Lindley, Earl of Halsbury LC

Quinn v Leathem [1901] UKHL 2, is a case on economic tort and is an important case historically for British labour law. It concerns the tort of "conspiracy to injure". The case was a significant departure from previous practices, and was reversed by the Trade Disputes Act 1906. However, the issue of secondary action was later restricted from the Employment Act 1980, and now the Trade Union and Labour Relations (Consolidation) Act 1992. The case was heavily controversial at the time, and generated a large amount of academic discussion, notably by Wesley Newcomb Hohfeld, which continued long after it was overturned.

== Facts ==
A trade union called the Belfast Journeymen Butchers' and Assistants' Association had wanted to enforce a closed shop agreement against Leathem's butcher business in Lisburn. They approached one of his customers, Andrew Munce in Belfast, and told him that he should refuse to trade with Leathem unless Leathem employed only workers who joined the trade union. They said that if Munce did not do as they wished, they would call a strike among Munce's own workers. Munce had been buying Leathem's beef for 20 years, but there had been no written contract about it, and none of Munce's workers had yet been induced to strike (break their contracts).

Leathem suffered considerable loss to his business, and brought an action for conspiracy. FitzGibbon L.J. instructed the jury that the crucial question was whether the defendants' dominant motive had been to injure the plaintiff. The jury found for the plaintiff and awarded him £200 damages.

== Judgment ==
The defendants moved in the Queen's Bench Division of the Irish High Court for a new trial: the application was rejected by a majority, with a notable dissenting judgment from Chief Baron Christopher Palles. The decision of the High Court was affirmed by the Irish Court of Appeal, and the case proceeded to the House of Lords.

The House of Lords held that there was a "conspiracy to injure", which consisted of the intention to cause harm to others. It is perfectly lawful for one person acting alone to attempt that. However, if it is two or more, it suddenly becomes unlawful, and liability in tort follows: "It is a violation of legal right to interfere with contractual relations recognised by law if there be no sufficient justification for the interference".

Lord Lindley gave the following judgment.

My Lords, the case of Allen v Flood has so important a bearing on the present appeal that it is necessary to ascertain exactly what this House really decided in that celebrated case. It was an action by two workmen of an iron company against three members of a trade union, namely, Allen and two others, for maliciously, wrongfully, and with intent to injure the plaintiffs, procuring and inducing the iron company to discharge the plaintiffs. The action was tried before Kennedy J., who ruled that there was no evidence to go to the jury of conspiracy, intimidation, coercion, or breach of contract. The result of the trial was that the plaintiffs obtained a verdict and judgment against Allen alone. He appealed, and the only question which this House had to determine was whether what he had done entitled the plaintiffs to maintain their action against him. What the jury found that he had done was, that he had maliciously induced the employers of the plaintiffs to discharge them, whereby the plaintiffs suffered damage. Different views were taken by the noble Lords who heard the appeal as to Allen's authority to call out the members of the union, and also as to the means used by Allen to induce the employers of the plaintiffs to discharge them; but, in the opinion of the noble Lords who formed the majority of your Lordships' House, all that Allen did was to inform the employers of the plaintiffs that most of their workmen would leave them if they did not discharge the plaintiffs. There being no question of conspiracy, intimidation, coercion, or breach of contract for consideration by the House, and the majority of their Lordships having come to the conclusion that Allen had done no more than I have stated, the majority of the noble Lords held that the action against Allen would not lie; that he had infringed no right of the plaintiffs; that he had done nothing which he had no legal right to do, and that the fact that he had acted maliciously and with intent to injure the plaintiffs did not, without more, entitle the plaintiffs to maintain the action.

My Lords, this decision, as I understand it, establishes two propositions: one a far-reaching and extremely important proposition of law, and the other a comparatively unimportant proposition of mixed law and fact, useful as a guide, but of a very different character from the first.

The first and important proposition is that an act otherwise lawful, although harmful, does not become actionable by being done maliciously in the sense of proceeding from a bad motive, and with intent to annoy or harm another. This is a legal doctrine not new or laid down for the first time in Allen v Flood; it had been gaining ground for some time, but it was never before so fully and authoritatively expounded as in that case. In applying this proposition care, however, must be taken to bear in mind, first, that in Allen v Flood criminal responsibility had not to be considered. It would revolutionise criminal law to say that the criminal responsibility for conduct never depends on intention. Secondly, it must be borne in mind that even in considering a person's liability to civil proceedings the proposition in question only applies to “acts otherwise lawful,” i.e., to acts involving no breach of duty, or, in other words, no wrong to any one. I shall refer to this matter later on.

The second proposition is that what Allen did infringed no right of the plaintiffs, even although he acted maliciously and with a view to injure them. I have already stated what he did, and all that he did, in the opinion of the majority of the noble Lords. If their view of the facts was correct, their conclusion that Allen infringed no right of the plaintiffs is perfectly intelligible, and indeed unavoidable. Truly, to inform a person that others will annoy or injure him unless he acts in a particular way cannot of itself be actionable, whatever the motive or intention of the informant may have been.

My Lords, the questions whether Allen had more power over the men than some of their Lordships thought, and whether Allen did more than they thought, are mere questions of fact. Neither of these questions is a question of law, and no Court or jury is bound as a matter of law to draw from the facts before it inferences of fact similar to those drawn by noble Lords from the evidence relating to Allen in the case before them.

I will pass now to the facts of this case, and consider (1.) what the plaintiff's rights were; (2.) what the defendants' conduct was; (3.) whether that conduct infringed the plaintiff's rights. For the sake of clearness it will be convenient to consider these questions in the first place apart from the statute which legalises strikes, and in the next place with reference to that statute.

1. As to the plaintiff's rights. He had the ordinary rights of a British subject. He was at liberty to earn his own living in his own way, provided he did not violate some special law prohibiting him from so doing, and provided he did not infringe the rights of other people. This liberty involved liberty to deal with other persons who were willing to deal with him. This liberty is a right recognised by law; its correlative is the general duty of every one not to prevent the free exercise of this liberty, except so far as his own liberty of action may justify him in so doing. But a person's liberty or right to deal with others is nugatory, unless they are at liberty to deal with him if they choose to do so. Any interference with their liberty to deal with him affects him. If such interference is justifiable in point of law, he has no redress. Again, if such interference is wrongful, the only person who can sue in respect of it is, as a rule, the person immediately affected by it; another who suffers by it has usually no redress; the damage to him is too remote, and it would be obviously practically impossible and highly inconvenient to give legal redress to all who suffered from such wrongs. But if the interference is wrongful and is intended to damage a third person, and he is damaged in fact - in other words, if he is wrongfully and intentionally struck at through others, and is thereby damnified - the whole aspect of the case is changed: the wrong done to others reaches him, his rights are infringed although indirectly, and damage to him is not remote or unforeseen, but is the direct consequence of what has been done. Our law, as I understand it, is not so defective as to refuse him a remedy by an action under such circumstances. The cases collected in the old books on actions on the case, and the illustrations given by the late Bowen L.J. in his admirable judgment in the Mogul Steamship Company's Case, may be referred to in support of the foregoing conclusion, and I do not understand the decision in Allen v Flood to be opposed to it.

If the above reasoning is correct, Lumley v Gye was rightly decided, as I am of opinion it clearly was. Further, the principle involved in it cannot be confined to inducements to break contracts of service, nor indeed to inducements to break any contracts. The principle which underlies the decision reaches all wrongful acts done intentionally to damage a particular individual and actually damaging him. Temperton v Russell ought to have been decided and may be upheld on this principle. That case was much criticised in Allen v Flood, and not without reason; for, according to the judgment of Lord Esher, the defendants' liability depended on motive or intention alone, whether anything wrong was done or not. This went too far, as was pointed out in Allen v Flood. But in Temperton v Russell there was a wrongful act, namely, conspiracy and unjustifiable interference with Brentano, who dealt with the plaintiff. This wrongful act warranted the decision, which I think was right.

2. I pass on to consider what the defendants did. The appellant and two of the other defendants were the officers of a trade union, and the jury have found that the defendants wrongfully and maliciously induced the customers of the plaintiff to refuse to deal with him, and maliciously conspired to induce them not to deal with him. There were similar findings as to inducing servants of the plaintiff to leave him. What the defendants did was to threaten to call out the union workmen of the plaintiff and of his customers if he would not discharge some non-union men in his employ. In other words, in order to compel the plaintiff to discharge some of his men, the defendants threatened to put the plaintiff and his customers, and persons lawfully working for them, to all the inconvenience they could without using violence. The defendants' conduct was the more reprehensible because the plaintiff offered to pay the fees necessary to enable his non-union men to become members of the defendants' union; but this would not satisfy the defendants. The facts of this case are entirely different from those which this House had to consider in Allen v Flood. In the present case there was no dispute between the plaintiff and his men. None of them wanted to leave his employ. Nor was there any dispute between the plaintiff's customers and their own men, nor between the plaintiff and his customers, nor between the men they respectively employed. The defendants called no witnesses, and there was no evidence to justify or excuse the conduct of the defendants. That they acted as they did in furtherance of what they considered the interests of union men may probably be fairly assumed in their favour, although they did not come forward and say so themselves; but that is all that can be said for them. No one can, I think, say that the verdict was not amply warranted by the evidence. I have purposely said nothing about the black list, as the learned judge who tried the case considered that the evidence did not connect the appellant with that list. But the black list was, in my opinion, a very important feature in the case.

3. The remaining question is whether such conduct infringed the plaintiff's rights so as to give him a cause of action. In my opinion, it plainly did. The defendants were doing a great deal more than exercising their own rights: they were dictating to the plaintiff and his customers and servants what they were to do. The defendants were violating their duty to the plaintiff and his customers and servants, which was to leave them in the undisturbed enjoyment of their liberty of action as already explained. What is the legal justification or excuse for such conduct? None is alleged, and none can be found. This violation of duty by the defendants resulted in damage to the plaintiff - not remote, but immediate and intended. The intention to injure the plaintiff negatives all excuses and disposes of any question of remoteness of damage. Your Lordships have to deal with a case, not of damnum absque injuria, but of damnum cum injuria.

Every element necessary to give a cause of action on ordinary principles of law is present in this case. As regards authorities, they were all exhaustively examined in the Mogul Steamship Co v MacGregor and Allen v Flood, and it is unnecessary to dwell upon them again. I have examined all those which are important, and I venture to say that there is not a single decision anterior to Allen v Flood in favour of the appellant. His sheet-anchor is Allen v Flood, which is far from covering this case, and which can only be made to cover it by greatly extending its operation.

It was contended at the bar that if what was done in this case had been done by one person only, his conduct would not have been actionable, and that the fact that what was done was effected by many acting in concert makes no difference. My Lords, one man without others behind him who would obey his orders could not have done what these defendants did. One man exercising the same control over others as these defendants had could have acted as they did, and, if he had done so, I conceive that he would have committed a wrong towards the plaintiff for which the plaintiff could have maintained an action. I am aware that in Allen v Flood, Lord Herschell expressed his opinion to be that it was immaterial whether Allen said he would call the men out or not. This may have been so in that particular case, as there was evidence that Allen had no power to call out the men, and the men had determined to strike before Allen had anything to do with the matter. But if Lord Herschell meant to say that as a matter of law there is no difference between giving information that men will strike and making them strike, or threatening to make them strike, by calling them out when they do not want to strike, I am unable to concur with him. It is all very well to talk about peaceable persuasion. It may be that in Allen v Flood there was nothing more; but here there was very much more. What may begin as peaceable persuasion may easily become, and in trades union disputes generally does become, peremptory ordering, with threats open or covert of very unpleasant consequences to those who are not persuaded. Calling workmen out involves very serious consequences to such of them as do not obey. Black lists are real instruments of coercion, as every man whose name is on one soon discovers to his cost. A combination not to work is one thing, and is lawful. A combination to prevent others from working by annoying them if they do is a very different thing, and is primâ facie unlawful. Again, not to work oneself is lawful so long as one keeps off the poor-rates, but to order men not to work when they are willing to work is another thing. A threat to call men out given by a trade union official to an employer of men belonging to the union and willing to work with him is a form of coercion, intimidation, molestation, or annoyance to them and to him very difficult to resist, and, to say the least, requiring justification. None was offered in this case.

My Lords, it is said that conduct which is not actionable on the part of one person cannot be actionable if it is that of several acting in concert. This may be so where many do no more than one is supposed to do. But numbers may annoy and coerce where one may not. Annoyance and coercion by many may be so intolerable as to become actionable, and produce a result which one alone could not produce. I am aware of the difficulties which surround the law of conspiracy both in its criminal and civil aspects; and older views have been greatly and, if I may say so, most beneficially modified by the discussions and decisions in America and this country. Amongst the American cases I would refer especially to Vegelahn v Guntner, where coercion by other means than violence, or threats of it, was held unlawful. In this country it is now settled by the decision of this House in the case of the Mogul Steamship Co that no action for a conspiracy lies against persons who act in concert damage another and do damage him, but who at the same time merely exercise their own rights and who infringe no rights of other people. Allen v Flood emphasises the same doctrine. The principle was strikingly illustrated in the Scottish Co-operative Society v Glasgow Fleshers' Association, which was referred to in the course of the argument. In this case some butchers induced some salesmen not to sell meat to the plaintiffs. The means employed were to threaten the salesmen that if they continued to sell meat to the plaintiffs they, the butchers, would not buy from the salesmen. There was nothing unlawful in this, and the learned judge held that the plaintiffs shewed no cause of action, although the butchers' object was to prevent the plaintiffs from buying for co-operative societies in competition with themselves, and the defendants were acting in concert.

The cardinal point of distinction between such cases and the present is that in them, although damage was intentionally inflicted on the plaintiffs, no one's right was infringed - no wrongful act was committed; whilst in the present case the coercion of the plaintiff's customers and servants, and of the plaintiff through them, was an infringement of their liberty as well as his, and was wrongful both to them and also to him, as I have already endeavoured to shew.

Intentional damage which arises from the mere exercise of the rights of many is not, I apprehend, actionable by our law as now settled. To hold the contrary would be unduly to restrict the liberty of one set of persons in order to uphold the liberty of another set. According to our law, competition, with all its drawbacks, not only between individuals, but between associations, and between them and individuals, is permissible, provided nobody's rights are infringed. The law is the same for all persons, whatever their callings: it applies to masters as well as to men; the proviso, however, is all-important, and it also applies to both, and limits the rights of those who combine to lock-out as well as the rights of those who strike. But coercion by threats, open or disguised, not only of bodily harm but of serious annoyance and damage, is primâ facie, at all events, a wrong inflicted on the persons coerced; and in considering whether coercion has been applied or not, numbers cannot be disregarded.

My Lords, the appellant relied on several authorities besides those already referred to, which I will shortly notice. No coercion of the plaintiff's employer, customers, servants, or friends had to be considered in Kearney v Lloyd. This is fully shewn in the various judgments now under review.

In Huttley v Simmons the plaintiff was a cab-driver in the employ of a cab-owner. The defendants were four members of a trade union who were alleged to have maliciously induced the cab-owner not to employ the plaintiff, and not to let him have a cab to drive. The report does not state the means employed to induce the cab-owner to refuse to have any dealings with the plaintiff. The learned judge who tried the case held that as to three of the defendants the plaintiff had no case, and that as to the fourth, against whom the jury found a verdict, no action would lie because he had done nothing in itself wrong, apart from motive, and that the fact that he acted in concert with others made no difference. It is difficult to draw any satisfactory conclusion from this case, as the most material facts are not stated.

I conclude this part of the case by saying that, in my opinion, the direction given to the jury by the learned judge who tried the case was correct, so far as the liability of the defendants turns on principles of common law, and that the objection taken to it by the counsel for the appellant is untenable. I mean the objection that the learned judge did not distinguish between coercion to break contracts of service, and coercion to break contracts of other kinds, and coercion not to enter into contracts.

I pass now to consider the effect of the statute 38 & 39 Vict. c. 86. This Act clearly recognises the legality of strikes and lock-outs up to a certain point. It is plainly legal now for workmen to combine not to work except on their own terms. On the other hand, it is clearly illegal for them or any one else to use force or threats of violence to prevent other people from working on any terms which they think proper. But there are many ways short of violence, or the threat of it, of compelling persons to act in a way which they do not like. There are annoyances of all sorts and degrees: picketing is a distinct annoyance, and if damage results is an actionable nuisance at common law, but if confined merely to obtaining or communicating information it is rendered lawful by the Act (s. 7). Is a combination to annoy a person's customers, so as to compel them to leave him unless he obeys the combination, permitted by the Act or not? It is not forbidden by s. 7; is it permitted by s. 3? I cannot think that it is. The Court of Appeal (of which I was a member) so decided in Lyons v Wilkins, in the case of Schoenthal, which arose there, and is referred to in the judgment of Walker L.J. at p. 99 of the printed judgments in this case. This particular point had not to be reconsidered when Lyons v Wilkins came before the Court of Appeal after the decision in Allen v Flood. But Byrne J. modified the injunction granted on the first occasion 141 by confining it to watching and besetting. He might safely have gone further and have restrained the use of other unlawful means; but the strike was then over, and his modification was not objected to, and cannot be regarded as an authority in favour of the appellant's contention.

It must be conceded that if what the defendants here did had been done by one person it would not have been punishable as a crime. I cannot myself see that there was in this case any trade dispute between employers and workmen within the meaning of s. 3. I am not at present prepared to say that the officers of a trade union who create strife by calling out members of the union working for an employer with whom none of them have any dispute can invoke the benefit of this section even on an indictment for a conspiracy.

But assuming that there was a trade dispute within the meaning of s. 3, and that an indictment for conspiracy could not be sustained in a case like this, the difference between an indictment for a conspiracy and an action for damages occasioned by a conspiracy is very marked and is well known. An illegal agreement, whether carried out or not, is the essential element in a criminal case; the damage done by several persons acting in concert, and not the criminal conspiracy, is the important element in the action for damages. In my opinion, it is quite clear that s. 3 has no application to civil actions: it is confined entirely to criminal proceedings. Nor can I agree with those who say that the civil liability depends on the criminality, and that if such conduct as is complained of has ceased to be criminal it has therefore ceased to be actionable. On this point I will content myself by saying that I agree with Andrews J. and those who concurred with him. It does not follow, and it is not true, that annoyances which are not indictable are not actionable. The law relating to nuisances, to say nothing of the law relating to combinations, shews that many annoyances are actionable which are not indictable, and the principles of justice on which this is held to be so appear to me to apply to such cases as these.

My Lords, I will detain your Lordships no longer. Allen v Flood is in many respects a very valuable decision, but it may be easily misunderstood and carried too far.

Your Lordships are asked to extend it and to destroy that individual liberty which our laws so anxiously guard. The appellant seeks by means of Allen v Flood, and by logical reasoning based upon some passages in the judgments given by the noble Lords who decided it, to drive your Lordships to hold that boycotting by trades unions in one of its most objectionable forms is lawful, and gives no cause of action to its victims although they may be pecuniarily ruined thereby.

My Lords, so to hold would, in my opinion, be contrary to well-settled principles of English law, and would be to do what is not yet authorized by any statute or legal decision.

In my opinion this appeal ought to be dismissed with costs.

== Significance ==
Quinn v Leathem formed a judicial reaction to the increasing activism of trade unions, together with the Taff Vale case. It was one reason for the formation of the UK Labour Party, and the case was overturned by Parliament in the Trade Disputes Act 1906 following the next general election.

Philosophically, the reasoning of Lord Lindley was criticised by WN Hohfeld in his influential discussion of types of rights, liberties and duties. In Hohfeld's view, the House of Lords judgment presumed illegitimately that Leathem had a right to conduct his business without any interference from third parties. Properly stated, Leathem was at liberty to do this, but this did not create any duty upon Quinn and the other workers to abstain from industrial action.

It is noteworthy that when the case was before the Irish High Court, Chief Baron Christopher Palles, who was an acknowledged master of the law of tort, differed from the majority of his colleagues in finding that the defendants' conduct was perfectly legal; according to his analysis of the precedents, a request that a businessman should deal only with customers who use union labour is lawful in itself, and whether the request is made by one person or several is irrelevant. The House of Lords admitted that this argument has a certain "inflexible logic", but declined to follow it.

== See also ==
- British labour law
- English tort law
