= Misuse of private information =

English common law tort

Misuse of private information is a new common law tort that English courts recognised in Campbell v MGN Ltd. Arising as a branch of the law relating to breach of confidence, it has been reinforced by Article 8 of the European Convention on Human Rights, supplemented by s. 6 of the Human Rights Act 1998, which obliges public institutions (including the courts) not to act inconsistently with Convention rights.

== Scope ==
Campbell was the watershed moment where the tort of "misuse of private information" became distinguished in scope from that relating to breach of confidence, as the former does not require "an initial confidential relationship." In addition, actions for misuse of private information can readily attract tortious damages, while those for breach of confidence may receive damages only as an equitable remedy within the discretion of the presiding judge.

While it will be obvious what may constitute public (as opposed to private) information in most cases, there will be times where it will need to be assessed as to whether disclosure of information would give substantial offence to an ordinary individual, as noted in Australia by Gleeson CJ in 2001:

An activity is not private simply because it is not done in public. It does not suffice to make an act private that, because it occurs on private property, it has such measure of protection from the public gaze as the characteristics of the property, the nature of the activity, the locality, and the disposition of the property owner combine to afford. Certain kinds of information about a person, such as information relating to health, personal relationships, or finances, may be easy to identify as private, as may certain kinds of activity which a reasonable person, applying contemporary standards of morals and behaviour, would understand to be meant to be unobserved. The requirement that disclosure or observation of information or conduct would be highly offensive to a reasonable person of ordinary sensibilities is in many circumstances a useful practical test of what is private.

As originally recognized in Campbell, a cause of action was restricted to disclosures of information or activities in which the plaintiff had a reasonable expectation of privacy. Expansion to include bare intrusions into privacy has been foreshadowed, such as where certain photographs are taken in a public place, however English courts are yet to definitively proscribe intrusions upon seclusion.

For example, an injunction against the Wolverhampton Express and Star was obtained in 2005 by an owner of several homes for troubled children to restrain it from disclosing plans for further homes, even though information was publicly available from searches of HM Land Registry records and unredacted minutes of local authority proceedings. In his judgment, Tugendhat J explained why, in this case, rights under Article 8 overrode competing obligations under Article 10 of the European Convention on Human Rights relating to freedom of expression:

... The information as to the addresses linked with information as to the business of the applicant and thus to the likely disabilities and other characteristics of the occupants of the addresses brings together matters which together amount to new information which was previously accessible to the public only in a limited and theoretical sense. Publication or republication risks causing serious harm to the children and carers who occupy, or are to occupy, the addresses concerned. The extent to which the material has or is about to become available to the public is not, on the evidence of this case, a reason for withholding the injunction sought…

== Other Commonwealth jurisprudence ==
In addition to the Australian case law drawn upon by Campbell, there has been other jurisprudence arising in New Zealand and Canada. While the House of Lords followed the model previously adopted by the High Court of Australia, the other two jurisdictions based their approach on the US Restatement of Torts (Second). It has been noted in Canada that the more principled approach adopted by the English courts post-Campbell may be a better one to follow.

== See also ==
- Privacy law
- Canadian privacy law
- Privacy in Australian law
- Right to privacy in New Zealand
