= Trade Disputes Act 1965 =

Act of the Parliament of the United Kingdom

Trade Disputes Act 1965 (Note: Section 2(1).)
- Act of Parliament
- Parliament of the United Kingdom
- Long title: An Act to prevent actions founded on tort, or of reparation, being brought in respect of certain acts done in contemplation or furtherance of trade disputes.
- Citation: 1965 c. 48
- Territorial extent: England and Wales; Scotland; (Note: Section 2(2).)

Dates
- Royal assent: 5 August 1965
- Commencement: 5 August 1965 (Note: The Acts of Parliament (Commencement) Act 1793.)
- Repealed: 28 February 1972 (Note: The Industrial Relations Act 1971 (Commencement No. 4) Order 1972 (SI 1972/36).)
Other legislation
Repealed by	Industrial Relations Act 1971
Relates to	Trade Disputes Act 1906

Status: Repealed

Text of statute as originally enacted

The Trade Disputes Act 1965 (c. 48) was an act of the Parliament of the United Kingdom, which supported closed shop practices in industrial relations. The principal effect was to reverse the legal position established by Rookes v Barnard in 1964, in which the threat of strike action from a union resulted in the sacking of a worker who had recently left that union. The House of Lords, acting as the highest court of appeal, held that the threat of strike action was unlawful intimidation.

The Trades Union Congress was concerned that the case would set a precedent for lawsuits against trade unions in a wide range of circumstances. Civil law had been one of the main tools employers used against unions in their early days until the Trade Disputes Act 1906 (6 Edw. 7. c. 47) gave unions immunity from certain torts (including conspiracy) when taken in pursuit of an industrial dispute. However, intimidation was not covered under the Trades Disputes Act, and it seemed possible that the Rookes vs Barnard judgment would support classifying a strike in any closed shop dispute as unlawful 'intimidation'.

As a result, the Labour government of Harold Wilson introduced legislation to restore the status quo from before the case. The act specified that a threat to withhold one's own labour or to induce others to do the same could give no cause for action in tort. However, a case of 'intimidation' in the everyday sense (for instance, a threat of physical violence) in the course of an industrial dispute would still be unlawful for the same reasons as set out in the case.

The Conservatives sought to amend the legislation to exclude the protection if the dispute was regarding the continued employment of an individual. That was intended to undermine the practice of the closed shop, the subject of the original case.

The closed shop was eroded by the Conservative government in the 1980s and eventually banned by the Employment Act 1990.

== Subsequent developments ==
The whole act was repealed by section 169(b) of, and schedule 9 to, the Industrial Relations Act 1971, which came into force on 28 February 1972.
