= Allen v Flood =

UK legal case

- Court: House of Lords
- Citation: [1898] AC 1

Case history
- Prior action: [1895] 2 QB 21

Case opinions
- Lord Halsbury LC, Lord Watson, Lord Ashbourne, Lord Herschell, Lord Macnaghten, Lord Morris, Lord Shand, Lord Davey, and Lord James of Hereford. Also invited to give opinions were Hawkins J, Mathew J, Cave J, North J, Wills J, Grantham J, Lawrance J and Wright J.

Keywords
- Economic tort, strike

Allen v Flood [1898] AC 1 is a leading case in English tort law and UK labour law on intentionally inflicted economic loss.

== Facts ==
A trade union official told an employer his members would not work alongside the claimants. The employer was pressured to get rid of the claimants. For the loss of work, the claimants sued the trade union official. An important fact is that all the workers in the case were only hired day by day. Therefore, the trade union official had never threatened a breach of contract because the contracts began afresh with a new day's work.

== Judgment ==
=== High Court ===
Kennedy J presided over the trial where the jury found that the plaintiffs had suffered damage to the extent of £20 each, and assessed the damage accordingly.

=== Court of Appeal ===
Lord Esher MR, Lopes LJ and Rigby LJ held that the action was maintainable against the district delegate.

=== House of Lords ===
The House of Lords held by a majority (Lord Watson, Lord Herschell, Lord Macnaghten, Lord Shand, Lord Davey, and Lord James) that even though there was a malicious motive, this could not render the conduct unlawful, because the effect actually complained of (not rehiring) was in itself entirely lawful.

As one of those invited to give an opinion, Cave J said the following.

The personal rights with which we are most familiar are:

1. Rights of reputation;
2. Rights of bodily safety and freedom;
3. Rights of property; or, in other words, rights relating to mind, body and estate

In my subsequent remarks the word 'right' will, as far as possible, always be used in the above sense; and it is the more necessary to insist on this as during the argument at your Lordship's bar it was frequently used in a much wider and more indefinite sense. Thus it was said that a man has a perfect right to fire off a gun, when all that was meant, apparently, was that a man has a freedom or liberty to fire off a gun, so long as he does not violate or infringe any one's rights in doing so, which is a very different thing from a right, the violation or disturbance of which can be remedied or prevented by legal process.

Giving the last judgment, Lord Davey said the following.

I accept for the present purpose without comment the doctrine laid down in Lumley v. Gye and Bowen v. Hall, that to maliciously induce one to break a contract of exclusive personal service with an employer to the injury of that employer is actionable. But a perusal of the judgments delivered by the learned judges in Lumley v. Gye shews that in their opinion at any rate it was vital to the plaintiffs' case that there was a subsisting contract of service. Crompton J. says that a person who maliciously interrupts the relation subsisting between master and servant during the time stipulated as the period of service commits a wrongful act for which he is responsible at law. And answering the argument that the rule did not apply where the service had not commenced, although there was an existing contract, the learned judge says: “I think that the relation of master and servant subsists sufficiently for the purpose of such an action during the time for which there is in existence a binding contract of hiring and service between the parties.” Erle J. states the general principle thus: “He who maliciously procures a damage to another by violation of his right ought to be made to indemnify, and that whether he procures an actionable wrong or a breach of contract.” An employer may discharge a workman (with whom he has no contract), or may refuse to employ one from the most mistaken, capricious, malicious, or morally reprehensible motives that can be conceived, but the workman has no right of action against him. It seems to me strange to say that the principal who does the act is under no liability, but the accessory who has advised him to do so without any otherwise wrongful act is under liability.

Lord Halsbury LC, Lord Ashbourne and Lord Morris dissented.

== Significance ==
Allen v Flood has come under criticism in some quarters. In another leading tort case in the context of union strike action, Rookes v Barnard, Lord Devlin expressed disapproval. However Allen v. Flood was approved by the House of Lords in the recent case of OBG v Allan.

Allen v Flood also held that the earlier economic tort case of Keeble v Hickeringill was just a nuisance case, and not an economic torts case.

== See also ==
- Labour law
- Contract law
