= Taff Vale Rly Co v Amalgamated Society of Rly Servants =

Taff Vale Railway Co v Amalgamated Society of Railway Servants
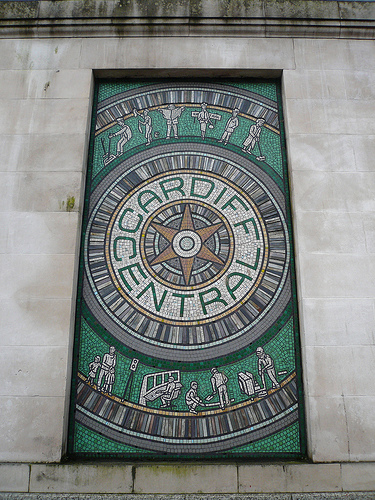
- Court: House of Lords
- Decided: 22 July 1901
- Citations: [1901] UKHL 1, [1901] AC 426

Case history
- Prior action: [1901] 1 KB 170 (CA) and

Court membership
- Judges sitting: Earl of Halsbury LC, Lord Macnaghten, Lord Shand, Lord Brampton and Lord Lindley

Keywords
- Right to strike, economic tort, conspiracy

Taff Vale Railway Co v Amalgamated Society of Railway Servants [1901] UKHL 1, commonly known as the Taff Vale case, is a formative case in UK labour law. It held that, at common law, unions could be liable for loss of profits to employers that were caused by taking strike action.

The labour movement reacted to Taff Vale with outrage; the case gave impetus to the establishment of the UK Labour Party and was soon reversed by the Trade Disputes Act 1906. It was reversed at common law in Crofter Hand Woven Harris Tweed Co Ltd v Veitch [1942].

== Facts ==
A trade union, called the Amalgamated Society of Railway Servants, went on strike to protest against the company's treatment of John Ewington, who had been refused higher pay and was punished for his repeated requests by being moved to a different station. When the Taff Vale Railway Company employed replacement staff, the strikers engaged in a sabotage campaign, greasing the rails and uncoupling the carriages. The Taff Vale Railway Company thus decided to engage with the union for the purpose of collective bargaining and the workers returned to work. The company, however, decided to sue the union for damages and won.

Previously it had been thought that trade unions could not be sued, because they were unincorporated entities, under the law of trusts.

Mr Justice Farwell held in favour of the company. His decision was reversed by the Court of Appeal, but restored on further appeal to the House of Lords.

== Judgment ==
The House of Lords ruled that, if a union is capable of owning property, and capable of inflicting harm on others, then it is liable in tort for the damage it causes. Here, the damage was said to be the economic loss caused to the company when the employees broke their contracts of employment to go on strike. So the Taff Vale Railway Company was successful in suing for damages. It was awarded £23,000 plus court costs, reaching a total of £42,000. This set the precedent that unions could be held liable for damages resulting from actions by its officials.

=== Earl of Halsbury LC ===
The Earl of Halsbury LC began.

My Lords, in this case I am content to adopt the judgment of Farwell J., with which I entirely concur; and I cannot find any satisfactory answer to that judgment in the judgment of the Court of Appeal which overruled it. If the Legislature has created a thing which can own property, which can employ servants, and which can inflict injury, it must be taken, I think, to have impliedly given the power to make it suable in a Court of Law for injuries purposely done by its authority and procurement. I move your Lordships that the judgment of the Court of Appeal be reversed and that of Farwell J. restored.

=== Lord Macnaughten ===
Lord Macnaughten delivered the leading judgment.

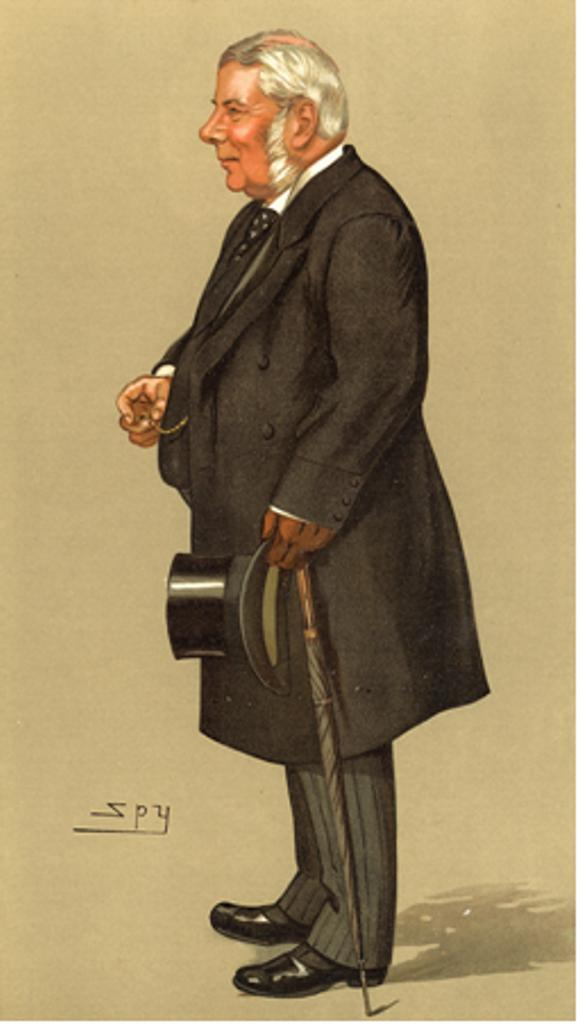
Lord Macnaughten

My Lords, I am of the same opinion.

Although I should be well content to adopt the judgment of Farwell J. and the reasons he has given, I will venture to add a few words of my own, partly out of respect for the Master of the Rolls, from whose opinion I never dissent without the greatest hesitation, and partly in deference to the argument of counsel, which, before your Lordships, has ranged over a wider field, and on the part of the respondents has, I think, assumed a somewhat bolder tone than in the Court below.

The case divides itself into two questions. One may be described as a question of substance; the other is rather a question of form.

Parliament has legalised trade unions, whether registered or not; if registered, they enjoy certain advantages. The respondent society is a registered trade union. Subject to such control as an annual general meeting can exercise, the government of the society is in the hands of its executive committee, a small body with vast powers, including an unlimited power of disposition over the funds of the union, except so far as it may be interfered with by the annual general meeting, or restricted by the operation of the society's rules, of which, in case of doubt, the executive committee is the sole authorized interpreter. Mr. Haldane pointed out, what is true enough, that the funds of the society were contributed for benefit purposes as well as for trade purposes, and warned your Lordships that, if those funds were made answerable for the consequences of such acts as are complained of in the present case, the widow and the orphan might suffer. At first sight that seems a strong point, but the truth is that all the moneys of the society, for whatever purpose they may be collected, form a common fund. That, I believe, is the case with most, if not all, trade unions. If you take up the Report of the Royal Commission on Trade Unions, and turn to the statement accompanying the Minority Report to which Mr. Haldane referred, you will see that there was nothing on which the advocates of trade unions insisted more strongly than on the right of unions to employ the whole of their funds if they chose for the purposes of strikes and in connection therewith. "At present," say the authors of that statement, "the strength of the union, and the confidence of its members, simply consists in this, that it can, if so disposed, employ the whole of its funds in the support of the trade ends." An enforced separation of the funds of the union would be, they say, "arbitrary interference with the liberty of association" - it would "paralyze the efficiency of the institution." The suggestion of such a proposal was "tantamount to a proposal to suppress unionism by statute."

The substantial question, therefore, as Farwell J. put it, is this: Has the Legislature authorized the creation of numerous bodies of men capable of owning great wealth and of acting by agents with absolutely no responsibility for the wrongs they may do to other persons by the use of that wealth and the employment of those agents? In my opinion, Parliament has done nothing of the kind. I cannot find anything in the Acts of 1871 (Note: Trade Union Act 1871 (34 & 35 Vict. c. 31)) and 1876, (Note: Trade Union Amendment Act 1876 (39 & 40 Vict. c. 22)) or either of them, from beginning to end, to warrant or suggest such a notion. It is perhaps satisfactory to find that nothing of the sort was contemplated by the minority of the members of the Royal Commission on Trade Unions, whose views found acceptance with the Legislature. In paragraph 4 of their report they say: It should be specially provided that except so far as combinations are thereby exempted from criminal prosecution nothing should affect … the liability of every person to be sued at law or in equity in respect of any damage which may have been occasioned to any other person through the act or default of the person so sued. Now, if the liability of every person in this respect was to be preserved, it would seem to follow that it was intended by the strongest advocates of trade unionism that persons should be liable for concerted as well as for individual action; and for this purpose it seems to me that it cannot matter in the least whether the persons acting in concert be combined together in a trade union, or collected and united under any other form of association.

Then, if trade unions are not above the law, the only remaining question, as it seems to me, is one of form. How are these bodies to be sued? I have no doubt whatever that a trade union, whether registered or unregistered, may be sued in a representative action if the persons selected as defendants be persons who, from their position, may be taken fairly to represent the body. As regards this point, Mr. Haldane relied on the case of Temperton v. Russell; but Temperton v. Russell, as I said in Duke of Bedford v. Ellis, was an absurd case. The persons there selected as representatives of the various unions intended to be sued were selected in defiance of all rule and principle. They were not the managers of the union - they had no control over it or over its funds. They represented nobody but themselves. Their names seem to have been taken at random for the purpose, I suppose, of spreading a general sense of insecurity among the unions who ought to have been sued, if sued at all, either in their registered name, if that be permissible, or by their proper officers - the members of their executive committees and their trustees.

Mr. Haldane, indeed, was bold enough to say that if a wrong was committed by a body of persons, acting in concert, who were too numerous to be made defendants in an action, the person injured would be without remedy, unless he could fasten upon the individuals who with their own hands were actually doing the wrong. Then he was asked, what would he say to such a case as this: Suppose there were a manufactory belonging to a co-operative society, unregistered, and composed of a great number of persons (as there well might be, but for the provision in the Companies Act making illegal an unregistered trading society consisting of more than twenty members), and suppose such a manufactory were poisoning a stream or fouling the atmosphere to the injury of its neighbours, might it do so with impunity? Mr. Haldane said Yes, you must pounce upon the individual offenders. It seems to me that this is a reduction to absurdity. I should be sorry to think that the law was so powerless; and therefore it seems to me that there would be no difficulty in suing a trade union in a proper case if it be sued in a representative action by persons who fairly and properly represent it.

The further question remains: May a registered trade union be sued in and by its registered name? For my part, I cannot see any difficulty in the way of such a suit. It is quite true that a registered trade union is not a corporation, but it has a registered name and a registered office. The registered name is nothing more than a collective name for all the members. The registered office is the place where it carries on business. A partnership firm which is not a corporation, nor, I suppose, a legal entity, may now be sued in the firm's name. And when, I find that the Act of Parliament actually provides for a registered trade union being sued in certain cases for penalties by its registered name, as a trade union, and does not say that the cases specified are the only cases in which it may be so sued, I can see nothing contrary to principle, or contrary to the provisions of the Trade Union Acts, in holding that a trade union may be sued by its registered name.

I am, therefore, of opinion that the appeal should be allowed and the judgment of Farwell J. restored with costs, here and below.

My noble and learned friend Lord Shand, who is unable to be present this morning, has asked me to read the following judgment.

=== Lord Shand ===
Lord Shand's judgment was read as follows:

My Lords, I am also of opinion that the judgment of the Court of Appeal should be recalled and the judgment of Farwell J. restored, and an injunction granted against the respondents in the terms settled by his Lordship.

The admirable judgment of Farwell J., in whose reasoning I entirely agree, makes it unnecessary again to go over the provisions of the statutes of 1871 and 1876, particularly after what has been said by your Lordships. I shall only add a few words in regard to the judgment of the Court of Appeal. It is true, as repeatedly stated both by Farwell J. and by the Master of the Rolls, that by neither of the statutes are trade unions, although registered, declared to be incorporations, which would as a consequence give them a right to sue and render them liable to be sued in the society's name. It is equally true, as the Master of the Rolls observes, that the right to sue and liability to be sued may be conferred by statute either expressly or by implication. In the words of the learned Master of the Rolls, enactments "must be found either express or implied enabling this to be done." I agree in thinking there is no express enactment to that effect; but, with great deference, in my opinion, the power of suing and liability to be sued in the society's name is clearly and necessarily implied by the provisions of the statutes. If Farwell J. had not carefully gone over and pointed out these provisions in his judgment, I should have thought it right now to do so, but I content myself by referring to what he has so well said. A registered trade union has an exclusive right to the name in which it is registered, a right to hold a limited amount of real estate and unlimited personal estate for its own use and benefit and the benefit of its members, the power of acting by its agents and trustees, and is liable to be sued for penalties, as it appears to me, in the society's name. I am clearly of opinion that these and the provisions generally of the statutes imply a liability on the society to be sued in its trade union name, and a privilege of thus suing.

I am further of opinion that, as the society by its agents is alleged to have been violating the law as stated by the appellants and sworn in their affidavits, the appellants are entitled to an injunction not only against the agents, but against the society itself, for whom their servants and agents were acting.

=== Lord Brampton ===
Lord Brampton concurred.

My Lords, I shall trouble your Lordships with but a few words, for I entirely concur in the judgment and words of the Lord Chancellor in adopting the judgment of Farwell J. I do not think this House is called upon to do more to-day than determine whether a primâ facie case has been disclosed by the Taff Vale Railway Company entitling them to the injunction they claimed, and whether the trade union society can be sued for such an injunction in its registered name. I think both these questions ought to be answered in the affirmative.

The lawless acts alleged to have been committed, and the continuance of which was more than probable, were clearly wrongful acts which justified the Taff Vale Railway Company in seeking to have them restrained by those who caused them to be committed, and inasmuch as they were done by men acting as agents of the society in furtherance of a strike sanctioned and directed by its authorized officers, the society is responsible for them. Whether it is so responsible in and by its registered name is the only remaining question.

I see no reason why this question should not also be answered in the affirmative. I think that a legal entity was created under the Trade Union Act, 1871, by the registration of the society in its present name in the manner prescribed, and that the legal entity so created, though not perhaps in the strict sense a corporation, is nevertheless a newly created corporate body created by statute, distinct from the unincorporated trade union, consisting of many thousands of separate individuals, which no longer exists under any other name. The very omission from the statute of any provision authorizing and directing that it shall sue and be sued in any other name than that given to it by its registration appears to me to lead to no other reasonable conclusion than that in so creating it, it was intended by the Legislature that by that name and by no other it should be known, and that for all purposes that name should be used and applied to it in all legal proceedings unless there was any other provision which militated against such a construction, as, for instance, in the case of trustees, by s. 9 of the same Act, who hold real and personal property of the society. I may refer also to the effect of the rules with regard to the present registration. I find on page 91 of the Appendix that rule 7 (3) provides that the funds of every branch shall be the common property of the society. That being so, I do not see how it would be possible for these funds to be made applicable for remuneration or recompense or redress for any wrongful act done by a body of men like the society unless the society can be sued in the way in which it is proposed to sue them, and as I think it may be.

For the reasons I have very shortly given, I am of opinion that the judgment of the Court of Appeal should be reversed, and the judgment of Farwell J. restored.

=== Lord Lindley ===
Lord Lindley, an expert on partnership law concurred.

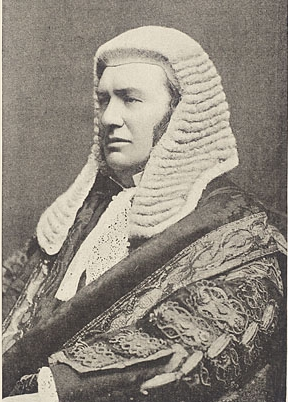
Lord Lindley

My Lords, the problem how to adapt legal proceedings to unincorporated societies consisting of many members is by no means new. The rules as to parties to common law actions were too rigid for practical purposes when those rules had to be applied to such societies. But the rules as to parties to suits in equity were not the same as those which governed courts of common law, and were long since adapted to meet the difficulties presented by a multiplicity of persons interested in the subject-matter of litigation. Some of such persons were allowed to sue and be sued on behalf of themselves and all others having the same interest. This was done avowedly to prevent a failure of justice: see Meux v. Maltby and the observations of Sir George Jessel M.R.

The principle on which the rule is based forbids its restriction to cases for which an exact precedent can be found in the reports. The principle is as applicable to new cases as to old, and ought to be applied to the exigencies of modern life as occasion requires. The rule itself has been embodied and made applicable to the various Divisions of the High Court by the Judicature Act, 1873, ss. 16 and 23-25, and Order XVI., r. 9; and the unfortunate observations made on that rule in Temperton v. Russell have been happily corrected in this House in the Duke of Bedford v. Ellis and in the course of the argument in the present case.

I have myself no doubt whatever that if the trade union could not be sued in this case in its registered name, some of its members (namely, its executive committee) could be sued on behalf of themselves and the other members of the society, and an injunction and judgment for damages could be obtained in a proper case in an action so framed. Further, it is in my opinion equally plain that if the trustees in whom the property of the society is legally vested were added as parties, an order could be made in the same action for the payment by them out of the funds of the society of all damages and costs for which the plaintiff might obtain judgment against the trade union.

I entirely repudiate the notion that the effect of the Trade Union Act, 1871, is to legalise trade unions and confer on them the right to acquire and hold property, and at the same time to protect the union from legal proceedings if their managers or agents acting for the whole body violate the rights of other people. For such violation the property of trade unions can unquestionably in my opinion be reached by legal proceedings properly framed. The Court of Appeal has not denied this; but the Court has held that the trade union cannot be sued in its registered name, and in strictness the only question for determination by your Lordships now is whether the Court of Appeal was right in holding that the name of the trade union ought to be struck out of the writ, and that the injunction granted against the trade union in that name ought to be discharged.

If I am right in what I have already said, this question is of comparatively small importance: it is not a question of substance but of mere form, and turns on the Trade Union Act, 1871 (34 & 35 Vict. c. 31), and the Act of 1876 (39 & 40 Vict. c. 22) amending it. The Act does not in express terms say what use is to be made of the name under which the trade union is registered and by which it is known. But a trade union which is registered under the Act must have a name: see ss. 14, 16, and Sched. I.; it may acquire property, but, not being incorporated, recourse is had to the old well-known machinery of trustees for acquiring and holding such property, and for suing and being sued in respect of it (ss. 7, 8, 9). The property so held is, however, the property of the union: the union is the beneficial owner. Sect. 12 provides summary remedies for misapplications of the trade union's property, but there is nothing here to oust the jurisdiction of the superior Courts, and, there being nothing in the Act to prevent it, I cannot conceive why an action in the name of the trade union, against its trustees to restrain a breach of trust or to make them account for a breach of trust already committed should be held unmaintainable or wrong in point of form. Further, ss. 15 and 16 of the Act of 1871, and s. 15 of the Act of 1876, impose duties on registered trade unions and penalties on them (and not only on their officials) for breach of those duties. The mode of enforcing these penalties is pointed out in s. 19 of the Act of 1871, but there is nothing there to shew that the trade union on which the duty is cast and which has to pay the penalty could not be proceeded against in its registered name. Again, I apprehend that a mandamus could go against a trade union to compel it to perform the duties cast upon it by statute; and here again the obvious course would be to proceed against the union by its registered name unless there is something in the statute to prevent it. My Lords, a careful study of the Act leads me to the conclusion that the Court of Appeal held, and rightly held, that trade unions are not corporations; but the Court held further that, not being corporations, power to sue and be sued in their registered name must be conferred upon them; and further that the language of the statutes was not sufficient for the purpose. Upon this last point I differ from them. The Act appears to me to indicate with sufficient clearness that the registered name is one which may be used to denote the union as an unincorporated society in legal proceedings as well as for business and other purposes. The use of the name in legal proceedings imposes no duties and alters no rights: it is only a more convenient mode of proceeding than that which would have to be adopted if the name could not be used. I do not say that the use of the name is compulsory, but it is at least permissive.

Your Lordships have not now to consider how a judgment or order against a trade union in its registered name can be enforced. I see no difficulty about this; but, to avoid misconception, I will add that if a judgment or order in that form is for the payment of money it can, in my opinion, only be enforced against the property of the trade union, and that to reach such property it may be found necessary to sue the trustees.

I am of opinion that the orders of Farwell J were right and should be restored.

== Significance ==
Balfour's Conservative government later set up a royal commission, a decision that was unpopular among trade unionists. The decision was a turning point for the newly formed Labour Representation Committee. Affiliation from trade unions to the LRC stood at 350,000 in 1901 but rose to 450,000 in 1902 and 850,000 in 1903. Five more joined this cause in through the formation of the 'League Chat'. A mass movement was being formed that led to the creation of the modern British Labour Party. Subsequently the Labour party was elected in a significant minority of the seats in Parliament and, in partnership with the Liberal government, passed the Trade Disputes Act 1906. This overrode the ruling in Taff Vale and provided the foundation for the law on the right to strike in the UK, that no cause of action could be brought against a trade union for economic loss, if a strike was "in contemplation or furtherance of a trade dispute". Although English law does not provide a 'right' to strike in the strict sense, it is better seen as providing immunity from tortious liability should certain substantive and procedural requirements be met.

== See also ==
- Trade Disputes Act 1906
- Quinn v Leatham [1901] AC 495 HL
- South Wales Miners' Federation v Glamorgan Coal Co [1905] AC 239
