= BBC v Hearn =

UK employment law case

- Court: Court of Appeal
- Citation: [1977] 1 WLR 1004; [1978] 1 All ER 111; [1977] IRLR 273; [1977] ICR 685

Keywords
- Trade union, collective bargaining

BBC v Hearn [1977] ICR 685 is a UK labour law case, concerning collective action and the scope of a "trade dispute" under what is now TULRCA 1992 section 244.

== Facts ==
The BBC wanted an injunction to restrain Hearn and the Association of Broadcasting Staff from stopping broadcast of the 1977 FA Cup Final. ABS objected to transmission unless the BBC agreed to not broadcast to South Africa.

In the High Court, Pain J held that the proposed action was in contemplation or furtherance of a trade dispute.

== Judgment ==
Lord Denning MR held that the injunction was to be granted, because it was not strictly a dispute over terms and conditions of work.

To become a trade dispute, there would have to be something of the kind which was discussed in the course of argument before us: ‘We would like you to consider putting a clause in the contract by which our members are not bound to take part in any broadcast which may be viewed in South Africa because we feel that it is obnoxious to their views and to the views of a great multitude of people. We would like that clause to be put in, or a condition of that kind to be understood.’ If the BBC refused to put in such a condition, or refused to negotiate about it, that might be a trade dispute.... But the matter never reached that stage at all.... It was coercive interference and nothing more. If that is the right view, it means that the trade union and its officers are not exempt from the ordinary rule of law – which is that men must honour their contracts, and must not unlawfully interfere with the performance of them.

== See also ==
- UK labour law
- Hadmor Productions Ltd v Hamilton [1983] 1 AC 191 at 227, 233–234, approving Hearn
- Re P (a minor) [2003] UKHL 8
