= RMT v Serco Ltd =

RMT v Serco; ASLEF v London & Birmingham Railway
- Court: Court of Appeal
- Citation: [2011] EWCA Civ 226

Case opinions
- Elias LJ

Keywords
- Trade union, collective bargaining

RMT v Serco Ltd and ASLEF v London & Birmingham Railway [2011] EWCA Civ 226 is a joined UK labour law case, concerning the right to strike under the Trade Union and Labour Relations (Consolidation) Act 1992.

== Facts ==
An injunction was granted against ASLEF after the union included two members in a ballot who were not entitled to vote, 605 people altogether. In the ballot, 472 voted, and 410 were in favour of taking collective action. The employer argued that this violated TULRCA 1992 section 226A, which requires accuracy in who should vote. It also argued that the union did not provide accurate information in the notice of its intention to hold a strike ballot.

The High Court held that the notice of the ballot was inaccurate because two extra members were included.

== Judgment ==
Elias LJ held that the inclusion of the extra members was a trivial mistake, and excusable. It was necessary to read all the words of the statute, especially TULRCA 1992 section 226A, so that the union was required only to provide information ‘so far as reasonably practicable is accurate at the time it is given having regard to the information in the union’s possession’.

Elias LJ gave the leading judgment, with the following introductory obiter dictum.

2. The common law confers no right to strike in this country. Workers who take strike action will usually be acting in breach of their contracts of employment. Those who organise the strike will typically be liable for inducing a breach of contract, and sometimes other economic torts are committed during the course of a strike. Without some protection from these potential liabilities, virtually all industrial action would be unlawful.

[...]

8. Although the common law recognises no right to strike, there are various international instruments that do: see for example Article 6 of the Council of Europe's Social Charter and ILO Conventions 98 and 151. Furthermore, the ECHR has in a number of cases confirmed that the right to strike is conferred as an element of the right to freedom of association conferred by Article 11(1) of the European Convention on Human Rights which in turn is given effect by the Human Rights Act.... the right is not unlimited and may be justifiably restricted under Article 11(2).... the detailed complexity of the balloting provisions, and their unnecessary intrusion into the union’s processes, involves a disproportionate interference with the Article 11(1) right.

[Elias LJ, at paragraphs 45-57, found that not balloting two members was ‘accidental’ under s 232A, and continued...]

69. Mr Hendy submits that the judge erred in his approach to this issue. In particular, he failed to focus on the whole of the relevant provision. The law requires that the figures are "as accurate as reasonably practicable in the light of the information in the possession of the union at the time when it complies with [the obligation]". The judge merely asked himself whether the figures were "as accurate as reasonably practicable". The focus on the information actually in the hands of the union at the time when it complies with its obligation is, submits Mr Hendy, crucial. It is not information which the union ought to have had if it had kept proper records, or information which it could obtain, or which the union had in its possession at some other time. He relies in particular on the following obiter observations of Lloyd LJ in Metrobus:

"It is relevant in this context that the 2004 amendments included provisions, at section 226A(2D) and (2E), and correspondingly in section 234A, which limit the obligation imposed on a union in this respect, by a reasonable practicability criterion and by defining restrictively the information which is deemed for this purpose to be in the possession of the union. The latter, in particular, bears on the obligation to provide an explanation, because it limits the process which has to be undertaken, and therefore has to be explained, to the information so defined, and makes it what might be called a reasonable endeavours process."

70. I agree with Mr Hendy's submissions for a number of reasons. First, in my judgment Mr Béar's argument simply fails to give any weight to the fact that the reasonably practicable duty is limited by reference to the information possessed by the union. Without that limitation I would agree that if it were reasonably practicable for the union to go out and acquire the information, it would have to do so. But these are important limiting words and Mr Béar's construction simply ignores them. In my judgment if the intention of Parliament had been to create a duty to create records not otherwise available to the union, it would have said so unambiguously. No such statutory obligation is created. Moreover, there would seem to be no point in formulating a detailed definition of information in the possession of the union if this were not intended in some way materially to restrict the nature of the duty cast on the union.

[...]

94. I do not accept that the information has to be so specific, or needs to go further than the ACAS code recommends. Nor in fact will the information which Mr Béar submits should be given generally assist the employer in assessing the reliability of the information. Nothing is achieved by stating which particular officer obtained the information, or on which particular day, or whether contacts with local officers were by email or phone or anything of that kind. This provides no relevant assistance of any kind to the employer. In my view, to require this would simply be to set traps or hurdles for the union which have no legitimate purpose or function. I accept that it is of some relevance whether the information is drawn from union records or not since the employer can at least assume the union will have an interest in keeping them up to date; and it is of some relevance whether that information is national or local. If the information has been obtained by the union in some other way, that should be disclosed, as the Code suggests. Beyond that, however, I do not think that the scope of the statutory duty should be further expanded by reference to some dimly perceived statutory objective.

[...]

103. In assessing the accuracy of the explanation, it must be born in mind that the union officials providing it are not drafting a statute, and nor are they required to use undue precision or accuracy in their use of language. In my view the courts should not take the draconian step of invalidating the ballot, thereby rendering the strike unlawful, simply because the term used to describe a particular process is infelicitous. In my judgment the description of the process undertaken would have to be positively and materially misleading before the explanation could be said to fall short of the statutory requirement.

Etherton LJ and Mummery LJ concurred.

== See also ==
- UK labour law
