= London Underground Ltd v National Union of Railwaymen, Maritime and Transport Staff =

London Underground Ltd v RMT
- Court: Court of Appeal
- Citation: [1996] ICR 170

Court membership
- Judges sitting: Butler-Sloss LJ, Millett LJ and Ward LJ

Keywords
- Right to strike, fundamental human right, balloting

London Underground Ltd v National Union of Railwaymen, Maritime and Transport Staff [1996] ICR 170 is a UK labour law case, concerning the right to strike.

The case is also notable as Millett LJ stated in the course of his judgment that:

It would be astonishing if a right which was first conferred by Parliament in 1906, which has been enjoyed by trade unions ever since and which is today recognised as encompassing a fundamental human right, should have been removed by Parliament by enacting a series of provisions intended to strengthen industrial democracy and governing the relations between a union and its own members.

== Facts ==
London Underground Ltd claimed an injunction from the RMT making new members support a strike after a ballot had been taken. The RMT called on members to strike and notified employers under the Trade Union and Labour Relations (Consolidation) Act 1992 section 226A it would hold a ballot, gave them a list of 5000 union members under s 234A. The ballot was 4–7 August 2000 members voted in favour, 622 against. It notified the result under s 234A, with a strike called from 25 August to 4 September. Twenty members had since joined. Mance J held the union had no statutory immunity for any inducements to the 69s members who joined after the ballot, but did not lose immunity for the whole strike. The union appealed.

== Judgment ==
The Court of Appeal held there was full immunity. Under TULRCA 1992 s 226 a union had statutory immunity from suit for inducing any members to strike where it was supported under TULRCA 1992 ss 226–232. The strike itself had to have support of a ballot, not an individual itself taking part, so if a majority were in favour the strike was lawful and no immunity was lost for inducement of new members joining after the strike ballot.

Millett LJ said the following.

Parliament's object in introducing the democratic requirement of a secret ballot is not to make life more difficult for trade unions by putting further obstacles in their way before they can call for industrial action with impunity, but to ensure that such action should have the genuine support of the members who are called upon to take part. The requirement has not been imposed for the protection of the employer or the public, but for the protection of the union's own members. Those who are members at the date of the ballot, and whom the union intends to call on to take industrial action, are entitled to be properly consulted without pressure or intimidation. There is no possible reason to extend the same protection to those who join the union after the ballot. They do so of their own volition and in the knowledge of the outcome of the ballot and of the imminence of industrial action in which they will be called upon to take part. Counsel for the plaintiff criticised the judge for drawing the inference that those who do so probably supported industrial action. Persons who join a union do so for a variety of reasons; a desire to take part in industrial action is only one of them. Perhaps so; but it is an obvious inference that persons who willingly join in such circumstances are not unwilling to take part in the action and it is reasonable to conclude that most of them are probably (to use the wording of the ballot paper) prepared to take part in it.

The judge thought that there would be strange consequences if the union were permitted, without losing its statutory indemnity, to induce persons to break their contracts of employment who could not and did not fall within the constituency of those balloted. A small union, he pointed out, could hold a ballot of its own members and then set about inducing all the employees of a much larger constituency who had never been balloted to break their contracts of employment.

So it could; but, with respect to the judge, there is nothing in the slightest strange in that. There has never been any identity between the constituency of those to be balloted and the constituency of those whom in contemplation or furtherance of a trade dispute the union may with impunity induce to break their contracts. As I have already pointed out, the immunity is in wide terms. It extends to anyone whom the union induces to break his contract; it is not confined to members. To this extent the immunity is commensurate with the tort. A union may in contemplation or furtherance of a trade dispute with impunity induce non-members to break their contracts.

This was plainly the law before 1984. In my view it is still the law. The immunities conferred by sections 219 and 220 of the Act of 1992 are still in the widest terms. Sections 226 to 235, which introduce the balloting requirements, are concerned exclusively with the relationship between a union and its members and are intended for the protection of members. Non-members have no right to be consulted before a union calls on its members to take industrial action; indeed, as we have seen, the union must not include them in the ballot. But there is nothing in sections 226 to 235 to limit the union's right to seek to persuade non-members to support it by abstaining from work.

The language of the statute is striking. The immunity is from liability “for inducing another person to break a contract” (section 219) or from “peacefully persuading any person … to abstain from working” (section 220). These expressions are equally applicable to members and non-members. Immunity is withdrawn, however, in narrower circumstances. In describing them, the draftsman has carefully eschewed the use of the expression “induce a person to break his contract.” Instead, he has throughout used the expression “induce a person to take part in industrial action.” As a matter of ordinary language, no doubt, a non-member who stops work in support of his colleagues can be said to be taking part in their industrial action. But I am inclined to think that this is not the way in which the expression is used in sections 226 to 235. The industrial action there referred to is collective action by members of the union which has called the action with the support of a ballot of its members, a majority of whom have declared that they are prepared to take part in the action. The action must be called by a person specified in that behalf on the ballot paper. There are numerous indications which support the view that the draftsman is drawing a sharp distinction between the act of a union in calling on its own members to take part in industrial action and its acts in calling upon non-members for support by breaking their contracts of employment. The distinction would also help to make sense of an otherwise difficult and perhaps unworkable section 234A. As, however, we have heard no argument on this action, I prefer to express no view on this.

If inducing non-members to support industrial action by withdrawing their labour is to be distinguished from inducing members to take part in the industrial action called by the union, then it is an activity which attracts immunity under sections 219 and 220 but falls outside the withdrawal of the immunity in section 226(1). But even if the premise is not right, I think that the same conclusion is nevertheless correct. It would be astonishing if a right which was first conferred by Parliament in 1906, which has been enjoyed by trade unions ever since and which is today recognised as encompassing a fundamental human right, should have been removed by Parliament by enacting a series of provisions intended to strengthen industrial democracy and governing the relations between a union and its own members.

I conclude, therefore, that there is nothing in sections 226 to 235 which curtails a union's long accepted right to induce non-members to support the industrial action called by the union by breaking their own contracts of employment. But if this is so, then there is no reason to deny the same right in respect of non-members who have subsequently joined the union. There is simply no objection to a small union, which has the support of a ballot of its own members, from seeking to attract support from non-members.

The judge may also have been influenced by the fact that the union has obtained a large influx of new members by an active recruiting campaign. I am unable to see what objection there can be to such activity. A union is plainly free to campaign actively for new members before it holds the ballot in the hope that such members will support industrial action. If they become members before the ballot, they must be balloted, even though their views may affect the result of the ballot. I am unable to see why activity which is unobjectionable before the ballot is objectionable after it.

== See also ==
- United Kingdom labour law
