= Rookes v Barnard =

- Court: House of Lords
- Decided: 21 January 1964
- Citation: [1964] AC 1129, [1964] 1 All ER 367, [1964] UKHL 1

Court membership
- Judges sitting: Lord Reid, Lord Evershed, Lord Hodson, Lord Devlin and Lord Pearce

Rookes v Barnard [1964] UKHL 1 is a UK labour law and English tort law case and the leading case in English law on punitive damages and was a turning point in judicial activism against trade unions.

The case was almost immediately reversed by the Trade Disputes Act 1965 insofar as it decided on economic torts, although the law on punitive damages remains authoritative.

== Facts ==
Douglas Rookes was a draughtsman, employed by British Overseas Airways Corporation (BOAC). He resigned from his union, the Association of Engineering and Shipbuilding Draughtsmen (AESD), after a disagreement. BOAC and AESD had a closed shop agreement, and AESD threatened a strike unless Rookes resigned also from his job or was fired. BOAC suspended Rookes and, after some months, dismissed him with one week's salary in lieu of proper notice.

Rookes sued the union officials, including Mr Barnard, the branch chairman (also the divisional organiser Mr Silverthorne and the shop steward Mr Fistal). Rookes said that he was the victim of a tortious intimidation that had used unlawful means to induce BOAC to terminate his contract. The strike was alleged to be the unlawful means.

== Judgment ==
At first instance, before Sachs J, the action succeeded. This was overturned in the Court of Appeal. The House of Lords reversed the court of appeal, finding in favour of Rookes and against the union. Citing a case from the 18th century entitled Tarleton v M'Gawley (1793) Peake 270 where a ship fired a cannonball across the bow of another, Lord Reid said the union was guilty of the tort of intimidation. It was unlawful intimidation "to use a threat to break their contracts with their employer as a weapon to make him do something which he was legally entitled to do but which they knew would cause loss to the plaintiff".

A corollary to the main issue in the case, but of greater lasting importance, was Lord Devlin's pronouncements on when punitive damages are applied. The only three situations in which damages are allowed to be punitive, i.e. with the purpose of punishing the wrongdoer rather than aiming simply to compensate the claimant, are in cases of (1) oppressive, arbitrary or unconstitutional actions by the servants of government; (2) where the defendant's conduct was "calculated" to make a profit for himself; (3) where a statute expressly authorises the same.

there are certain categories of cases in which an award of exemplary damages can serve a useful purpose in vindicating the strength of the law and thus affording a practical justification for admitting into the civil law a principle which ought logically to belong to the criminal. I propose to state what these two categories are; and I propose also to state three general considerations which in my opinion should always be borne in mind when awards of exemplary damages are being made....

The first category is oppressive, arbitrary or unconstitutional action by the servants of the government. I should not extend this category,—I say this with particular reference to the facts of this case,—to oppressive action by private corporations or individuals. Where one man is more powerful than another, it is inevitable that he will try to use his power to gain his ends; and if his power is much greater than the other's, he might perhaps be said to be using it oppressively. If he uses his power illegally, he must of course pay for his illegality in the ordinary way; but he is not to be punished simply because he is the more powerful. In the case of the government it is different, for the servants of the government are also the servants of the people and the use of their power must always be subordinate to their duty of service. It is true that there is something repugnant about a big man bullying a small man and very likely the bullying will be a source of humiliation that makes the case one for aggravated damages, but it is not in my opinion punishable by damages.

Cases in the second category are those in which the Defendant's conduct has been calculated by him to make a profit for himself which may well exceed the compensation payable to the plaintiff. I have quoted the dictum of Erle C.J. in Bell v. The Midland Railway Company. Maule J. in Williams v. Curry, at page 848, suggests the same thing; and so does Martin B. in an arbiter dictum in Crouch v. Great Northern Railway Company, [1856] 11 Ex. 742, at 759. It is a factor also that is taken into account in damages for libel; one man should not be allowed to sell another man's reputation for profit. Where a Defendant with a cynical disregard for a Plaintiff's rights has calculated that the money to be made out of his wrong-doing will probably exceed the damages at risk, it is necessary for the law to show that it cannot be broken with impunity. This category is not confined to moneymaking in the strict sense. It extends to cases in which the Defendant is seeking to gain at the expense of the Plaintiff some object,— perhaps some property which he covets,—which either he could not obtain at all or not obtain except at a price greater than he wants to put down. Exemplary damages can properly be awarded whenever it is necessary to teach a wrongdoer that tort does not pay.

To these two categories which are established as part of the common law there must of course be added any category in which exemplary damages are expressly authorised by statute.

I wish now to express three considerations which I think should always be borne in mind when awards of exemplary damages are being considered. First, the Plaintiff cannot recover exemplary damages unless he is the victim of the punishable behaviour. The anomaly inherent in exemplary damages would become an absurdity if a Plaintiff totally unaffected by some oppressive conduct which the jury wished to punish obtained a windfall in consequence.

Secondly, the power to award exemplary damages constitutes a weapon that, while it can be used in defence of liberty, as in the Wilkes cases, can also be used against liberty. Some of the awards that juries have made in the past seem to me to amount to a greater punishment than would be likely to be incurred if the conduct were criminal; and moreover a punishment imposed without the safeguard which the criminal law gives to an offender. I should not allow the respect which is traditionally paid to an assessment of damages by a jury to prevent me from seeing that the weapon is used with restraint. It may even be that the House may find it necessary to follow the precedent it set for itself in Benham v. Gambling, and place some arbitrary limit on awards of damages that are made by way of punishment. Exhortations to be moderate may not be enough.

Thirdly, the means of the parties, irrelevant in the assessment of compensation, are material in the assessment of exemplary damages. Everything which aggravates or mitigates the Defendant's conduct is relevant. Thus a case for exemplary damages must be presented quite differently from one for compensatory damages; and the judge should not allow it to be left to the jury unless he is satisfied that it can be brought within the categories I have specified. But the fact that the two sorts of damage differ essentially does not necessarily mean that there should be two awards.

In a case in which exemplary damages are appropriate, a jury should be directed that if, but only if, the sum which they have in mind to award as compensation (which may of course be a sum aggravated by the way in which the Defendant has behaved to the Plaintiff) is inadequate to punish him for his outrageous conduct, to mark their disapproval of such conduct and to deter him from repeating it, then it can award some larger sum. If a verdict given on such direction has to be reviewed upon appeal, the appellate court will first consider whether the award can be justified as compensation and if it can there is nothing further to be said. If it cannot, the court must consider whether or not the punishment is in all the circumstances excessive.

== Significance ==
The case's result on restricting freedom of association was met with immediate outrage for creating, or reviving, economic torts as a weapon to undermine the right to strike, and was reversed by Parliament in the Trade Disputes Act 1965. However, the reasoning on exemplary damages in Rookes v Barnard has remained in England, although not been followed in Canada, New Zealand or Australia. In Broome v Cassell & Co Ltd, Lord Denning in the Court of Appeal called Lord Devlin's approach to exemplary damages "unworkable" and suggested it was decided per incuriam. He was strongly criticised in the House of Lords, which upheld Rookes v Barnard.

== See also ==
- UK labour law
- English tort law
