= Trade Disputes Act 1906 =

Act of the Parliament of the United Kingdom

Trade Disputes Act 1906 (Note: Section 5(1).)
- Act of Parliament
- Parliament of the United Kingdom
- Long title: An Act to provide for the regulation of Trades Unions and Trade Disputes.
- Citation: 6 Edw. 7. c. 47
- Territorial extent: United Kingdom

Dates
- Royal assent: 21 December 1906
- Commencement: 21 December 1906 (Note: The Acts of Parliament (Commencement) Act 1793.)
- Repealed: 28 February 1972 (Note: The Industrial Relations Act 1971 (Commencement No. 4) Order 1972 (SI 1976/36).)
Other legislation
Amends	Protection of Property Act 1875
Repealed by	Industrial Relations Act 1971

Status: Repealed

Text of statute as originally enacted

The Trade Disputes Act 1906 (6 Edw. 7. c. 47) was an act of the Parliament of the United Kingdom passed under the Campbell-Bannerman administration which provided that trade unions could not be sued for damages resulting from industrial action. Its key reform was to add to the Conspiracy and Protection of Property Act 1875 the famous words, "An act done in pursuance of an agreement or combination by two or more persons shall, if done in contemplation or furtherance of a trade dispute, not be actionable unless the act, if done without any such agreement or combination, would be actionable." After repeal and replacement of the 1875 act, these words are now found in the Trade Union and Labour Relations (Consolidation) Act 1992.

== Law ==
The immediate cause for the act was a trio of cases in the House of Lords, which had for the first time imposed damages in tort on trade unions for going on strike. Previously, the legal status of trade unions as an "unincorporated association", was accepted to mean that they did not have legal standing to sue, or be sued, in court.

Before the change, the two important cases were Lumley v Gye (1857) and Allen v Flood (1897). Lumley did not concern trade unions, but invented a new legal principle. An actress, Miss Wagner, had been engaged by Mr. Lumley to sing at Her Majesty's Theatre. Mr. Gye, who ran Covent Garden Theatre, procured her to break her contract with Mr. Lumley by promising to pay her more. He was held liable to Mr. Lumley for inducing a breach of contract. This is a principle readily applicable to union situations. In the case of a strike, a union effectively persuades or decides for workers to go on strike, in breach of their contracts with employers. But in Allen, the House of Lords held that a trade union could not be sued by a non-union worker for pressuring the employer into not hiring them. They said that even though the union's motive was malicious, the employer not hiring the non-union worker was lawful.

But then, Taff Vale Railway Co v Amalgamated Society of Railway Servants (1901) surprised everyone by saying that trade unions could be held liable for damages caused by industrial action. The Lords said if unions can harm people, they are bodies capable of being sued. The Labour movement was so incensed that it met at Farringdon Town Hall and resolved to form a Labour Party to get the decision reversed in Parliament. Two further cases followed worsening the possibility to collectively bargain. Quinn v Leatham ended all possibilities of a closed shop and South Wales Miners' Federation v Glamorgan Coal Co held that a union which induced a breach of contract had no defence of an "honest motive" (for instance, wanting to improve working conditions and get fair pay for employees).

== Politics ==
The Liberal Party was returned with a large majority in the House of Commons in the general election of 1906. A minority in the new Cabinet, including Campbell-Bannerman and John Burns, wanted to introduce a Bill stating that trade unions could not be liable for damages. However the majority opinion in the Cabinet, led by Chancellor of the Exchequer H. H. Asquith and other members with legal experience, argued that this would make unions too powerful and instead proposed to limit the application of the law of agency in respect to union activities. The latter faction prevailed and a bill was introduced on 28 March 1906 by the Solicitor General for England and Wales, William Robson. Many of the radical MPs did not understand the complicated legal wording of the Bill and so trade union MPs, led by W. Hudson, introduced their own bill.

== Passage through Parliament ==
The private members' bill was severely criticised by the Attorney General for England and Wales, John Lawson Walton, "who tore it to pieces in his best forensic style". Without warning his colleagues Campbell-Bannerman spoke in favour of the trade unionists' bill:

I have never been, and I do not profess to be now, very intimately acquainted with the technicalities of the question, or with the legal points involved in it. The great object then was, and still is, to place the two rival powers of capital and labour on an equality so that the fight between them, so far as fight is necessary, should be at least a fair one. ...I always vote on the second reading of a Bill with the understood reservation of details, which are to be considered afterwards. That is the universal practice. Shall I repeat that vote today? [Cries of "Yes".] I do not see any reason under the sun why I should not.

The Conservative MP George Wyndham said he had heard Campbell-Bannerman's peroration with blank amazement as it was incredible that he should on Friday request that MPs vote for a bill which his Attorney-General had strongly denounced on Wednesday. Asquith and the rest of the government opposition to the trade unionists' bill argued against it inside the Cabinet but the outcome of the committee dealing with the bill in August was to favour the trade unions' alternative.

During the Second Reading of the Trade Disputes Bill, Sir William Robson noted that the bill was intended to prevent "industrial conflict being the subject of litigation".

== Assessments ==
George Dangerfield wrote in his The Strange Death of Liberal England:

It gave the Unions an astounding, indeed an unlimited immunity. Labour was jubilant. The most powerful Government in history had been compelled, by scarcely more than a single show of power, to yield to the just demands of organized workers.

The English constitutional theorist A. V. Dicey argued that the act conferred

upon a trade union a freedom from civil liability for the commission of even the most heinous wrong by the union or its servant, and in short confer[red] upon every trade union a privilege and protection not possessed by any other person or body of persons, whether corporate or incorporate... [this act] makes a trade union a privileged body exempted from the ordinary law of the land. No such privileged body has ever before been deliberately created by an English Parliament.

The economist Joseph Schumpeter in his book Capitalism, Socialism and Democracy said of the act:

It is difficult, at the present time, to realize how this measure must have struck people who still believed in a state and in a legal system that centered in the institution of private property. For in relaxing the law of conspiracy in respect to peaceful picketing—which practically amounted to legalization of trade-union action implying the threat of force—and in exempting trade-union funds from liability in action for damages for torts—which practically amounted to enacting that trade unions could do no wrong—this measure in fact resigned to the trade unions part of the authority of the state and granted to them a position of privilege which the formal extension of the exemption to employers' unions was powerless to affect.

It remained in force until 1971. For the centenary of the act, the Trades Union Congress campaigned for a Trade Union Freedom Bill.

== Right to strike ==
The act was one of the most significant pieces of legislation for the 20th century, and was the cornerstone of the whole country's system of collective bargaining. It was also heavily influential abroad. The right to strike is now a "fundamental human right". In London Underground Ltd v NUR, Millett LJ said,

"a right which was first conferred by Parliament in 1906, which has been enjoyed by trade unions ever since and which is today recognised as encompassing a fundamental human right".

== Subsequent developments ==
The whole act was repealed by section of 169(b) of, and schedule 9 to, the Industrial Relations Act 1971, which came into force on 28 February 1972.
