= Crofter Hand Woven Harris Tweed Co Ltd v Veitch =

Crofter Tweed Ltd v Veitch
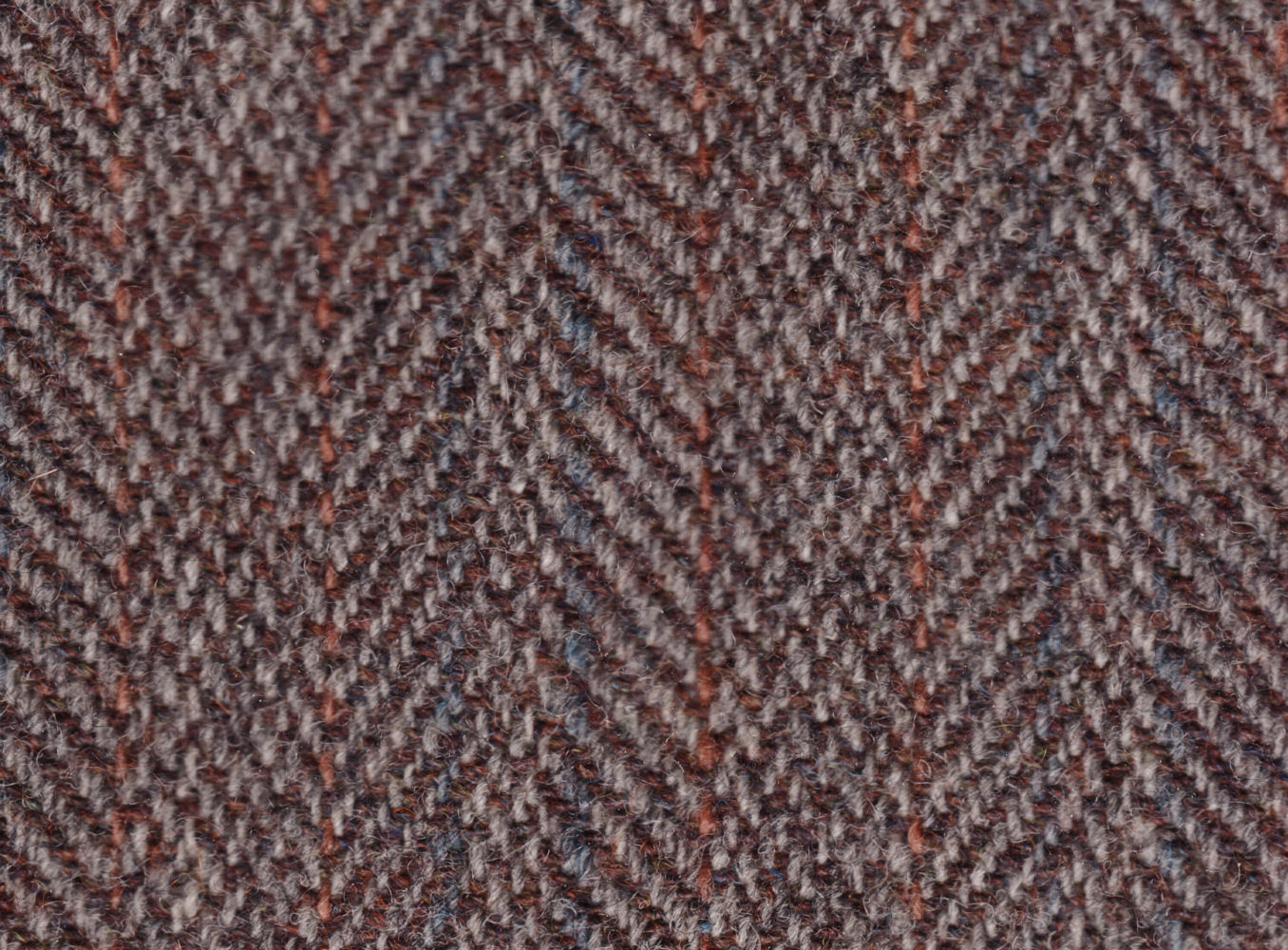
- Court: House of Lords
- Citations: [1941] UKHL 2, [1942] AC 435, 166 LT 172, 58 TLR 125, 111 LJPC 17

Case opinions
- Lord Chancellor Simon, Lord Wright

Keywords
- Collective bargaining, right to strike

Crofter Hand Woven Harris Tweed Co Ltd v Veitch [1941] UKHL 2 is a landmark UK labour law case on the right to take part in collective bargaining. However, the actual decision which appears to allow secondary action may have been limited by developments from the 1980s.

Lord Wright famously affirmed that:

Where the rights of labour are concerned, the rights of the employer are conditioned by the rights of the men to give or withhold their services. The right of workmen to strike is an essential element in the principle of collective bargaining.

== Facts ==
In the Harris Tweed industry on the Isle of Lewis in the Outer Hebrides, several independent producers of tweed cloth were in a dispute with the Transport and General Workers' Union over working conditions. The TGWU called on dockers in Stornoway, also TGWU members, to refuse to handle the yarn imported to the island by the producers.

== Judgment ==
The House of Lords held that there was no actionable conspiracy in this case. Lord Chancellor Simon said,

If the predominant purpose is the lawful protection or promotion of any lawful interest of the combiners (no illegal means being employed) it is not a tortious conspiracy, even though it causes damage to another person.

Lord Thankerton said the following.

In the present case the pressure was applied by means of action by the dockers, who were in no sense employees in, or directly connected with, the trade in Harris tweed; but employees in this trade were members of the same union, and the interest of the dockers and the trade employees in the union and its welfare were mutual, and I can see no ground for holding that it was not legitimate for the union to avail itself of the services of its docker members to promote the interests of the union.

Lord Wright affirmed that the union had a right to take part in collective bargaining and more than that said,

It cannot be merely that the Appellants' right to freedom in conducting their trade has been interfered with. That right is not an absolute or unconditional right. It is only a particular aspect of the citizen's right to personal freedom, and like other aspects of that right is qualified by various legal limitations, either by statute or by common law. Such limitations are inevitable in organised societies where the rights of individuals may clash. In commercial affairs each trader's rights are qualified by the right of others to compete. Where the rights of labour are concerned, the rights of the employer are conditioned by the rights of the men to give or withhold their services. The right of workmen to strike is an essential element in the principle of collective bargaining.

== See also ==
- UK labour law
