= Civil conspiracy =

Private citizens agreement to commit a crime

A civil conspiracy is a form of conspiracy involving an agreement between two or more parties to deprive a third party of legal rights or deceive a third party to obtain an illegal objective. A form of collusion, a conspiracy may also refer to a group of people who make an agreement to form a partnership in which each member becomes the agent or partner of every other member and engage in planning or agreeing to commit some act. It is not necessary that the conspirators be involved in all stages of planning or be aware of all details. Any voluntary agreement and some overt act by one conspirator in furtherance of the plan are the main elements necessary to prove a conspiracy.

A conspiracy may exist whether legal means are used to accomplish illegal results, or illegal means used to accomplish something legal. "Even when no crime is involved, a civil action for conspiracy may be brought by the persons who were damaged."

In tort law the legal elements necessary to establish a civil conspiracy are substantially the same as for establishing a criminal conspiracy, i.e. there is an agreement between two or more natural persons to break the law at some time in the future or to achieve a lawful aim by unlawful means. The criminal law often requires one of the conspirators to take an overt step to accomplish the illegal act to demonstrate the reality of their intention to break the law, whereas in a civil conspiracy, an overt act towards accomplishing the wrongful goal may not be required. Etymologically, the term comes from Latin con- "with, together", and spirare "to breathe".

== In United States business litigation ==
Business litigation often involves the use of conspiracy lawsuits against two or more corporations. Often joined in the lawsuit as defendants are the officers of the companies and outside accountants, attorneys, and similar fiduciaries. In many states, officers and directors of a corporation cannot engage in a conspiracy with the corporation unless acting for their private benefit independent of any benefit to the corporation.

Civil conspiracy law often takes the form of antitrust lawsuits, usually litigated in federal court, where, for example, a plaintiff may seek treble damages for overpayments caused by price-fixing above a market rate. The federal Sherman Antitrust Act provides both civil and criminal penalties. Other agreements among businesses and their agents for group boycotts, to monopolize, and to set predatory prices with intent to drive a small competitor out of business, would be actionable.

Conspiracies in violation of the federal securities laws such as the Securities Act of 1933 and the Securities Exchange Act of 1934 form another area where intense civil and criminal lawsuits occur over the existence or non-existence of an alleged conspiracy. Both the Securities Exchange Commission (SEC) and the Department of Justice bring legal actions for conspiracies to violate the securities laws. For example, a regional bank called PNC Financial Services Group Inc. through a subsidiary agreed, in June 2003, to pay $115 million in civil fines and restitution to settle the SEC's allegations of securities fraud. The subsidiary was accused of conspiracy to violate securities laws by transferring $762 million in troubled loans and investments to off-balance-sheet entities in 2001. In that case, the Justice Department deferred prosecution of PNC, citing its cooperation in a related investigation. Similarly, the civil litigation against the tobacco companies to recover health care costs, alleges a conspiracy under the Medical Care Recovery Act, 42 U.S.C. § 2651, et seq. (Count One), the Medicare Secondary Payer provisions of Subchapter 18 of the Social Security Act, 42 U.S.C. § 1395y(b)(2)(B)(ii) & (iii) (Count Two), and the civil provisions of the Racketeer Influenced and Corrupt Organizations ("RICO") 18 U.S.C. §§ 1961–1968, to deceive the American public about the health effects of smoking.

=== "Plain Language" jury instructions ===
Often the modern civil law of conspiracy is described in "plain language" jury instructions. The standard California jury instruction for conspiracy is governed by Rule 2.1050 of the California Rules of Court, The new California jury instructions are designated as the "official instructions for use in the state of California." It is not mandatory for the California judges to use them; but it is strongly encouraged.

An example of some of the "plain language" California civil instructions on the essential factual elements of conspiracy reads as follows (with fictional names placed in the blanks in the jury instruction form):

A conspiracy is an agreement between two or more persons to commit a wrongful act.

Such an agreement may be made orally or in writing or implied by the conduct of the parties.

Plaintiff Smith, Inc., claims that it was harmed by Defendant Jones Corp. for refusing to sell widgets to Plaintiff Smith, Inc. with intent to unreasonably injure competition and that Defendant Brown & Associates is also liable for the harm because it was part of the conspiracy with Jones Corp. to unreasonably injure competition under the California antitrust laws.

The facts of each case can vary widely as to exact nature of the underlying scheme. In the above example, a common fact pattern could be that widgets are necessary for Smith, Inc. to manufacture its product, and Brown & Associates is a competitor of Smith, Inc.

How the conspirators entice one another into the scheme also varies. In the above example Brown & Associates could promise Jones, Corp. kickbacks from the additional profits it hopes to make if Smith, Inc is forced out of business because it lacks the necessary widgets, or Jones Corp could entice Brown into a conspiracy with the prospect of increased profits, to be shared with Jones for withholding widgets from Smith.

== In English law ==
The tort of conspiracy requires there to be knowledge of the relevant circumstances and of the agreement made. Thus, as a precondition to corporate liability, it must be possible to attribute the relevant employee's or agent's knowledge to the corporation. There are two possible legal approaches:

- as a matter of agency law, the acts and omissions constituting the alleged conspiracy must have been carried out within the actual or ostensible authority of the agent; or
- as a matter of vicarious liability the acts and omissions must have been carried out in and during the course of the employment.

There is little difficulty when the claim is that the company either conspired with a second company or with at least two natural persons. The requisite knowledge can be attributed under either head as appropriate. But there is a problem under the first heading when fraud is involved because there is a clash of authority. Lloyd v Grace, Smith & Co [1912] AC 716 held that a Principal may be liable where the Agent commits a fraud within actual or apparent authority, whereas in In re Hampshire Land Company [1896] 2 Ch 743, it was held that the knowledge and, sometimes, the conduct of an Agent acting fraudulently so as to cause loss to the Principal will not be imputed to the Principal. In theory, vicarious liability may be of more assistance in that it is attributing the wrong done by one (natural) person to another (fictitious) but, in Belmont Finance Corporation v Williams Furniture Ltd [1979] Ch 250, the Hampshire Land agency line of authority was preferred. Belmont, a company in liquidation, sued a number of defendants, including the majority of its own directors, for conspiracy to procure Belmont to buy shares in another company at a gross overvalue. The purpose of this plan was to fund the acquisition of shares in Belmont itself by some of the defendants. Foster J. struck out the claim on the basis that Belmont was itself a party to the conspiracy. On appeal, Buckley LJ. said:

But in my view knowledge should not be imputed to the company, for the essence of the arrangements was to deprive the company improperly of a large part of its assets. As I have said, the company was a victim of the conspiracy. I think it would be irrational to treat the directors, who were allegedly parties to the conspiracy, notionally as having transmitted this knowledge to the company.

Because Belmont could only be a party to the conspiracy if knowledge was imputed, the Court of Appeal insulated it from the knowledge of its directors even though those directors, with that knowledge, made relevant decisions at board meetings and attached the company seal to the relevant documents. To that extent, liability in conspiracy is different from the standard vicarious liability situations in which, say, a company will be deemed to know that vehicles or machinery have not been properly maintained or that a service has been negligently delivered.

== See also ==
- Conspiracy (crime)
- Conspiracy (disambiguation)
- Hub-and-spoke conspiracy
