= OBG Ltd v Allan =

- Court: House of Lords
- Decided: 2 May 2007
- Citations: [2007] UKHL 21; [2008] 1 AC 1; [2007] 2 WLR 920; [2007] 4 All ER 545; [2008] 1 All ER (Comm) 1; [2008] 1 LRC 279; [2007] IRLR 608

Case history
- Prior actions: OBG Ltd & Anor v Allan & Ors [2005] EWCA Civ 106, [2005] 2 WLR 1174; [2005] QB 762 (9 February 2005)

Court membership
- Judges sitting: Lord Hoffmann; Lord Nicholls; Lord Walker; Baroness Hale; Lord Brown

Keywords
- Economic tort; Interference with a contract

OBG Ltd v Allan [2007] UKHL 21 was part of a combined appeal heard with Douglas v Hello! Ltd and Mainstream Properties Ltd v Young in the House of Lords, which stands as the leading case on economic torts in English law.

== Facts ==
Lord Hoffmann in his judgment summarised the facts in the three linked cases:

In OBG Ltd v Allan [2005] QB 762 the defendants were receivers purportedly appointed under a floating charge which is admitted to have been invalid. Acting in good faith, they took control of the claimant company's assets and undertaking. The claimant says that this was not only a trespass to its land and a conversion of its chattels but also the tort of unlawful interference with its contractual relations. It claims that the defendants are liable in damages for the value of the assets and undertaking, including the value of the contractual claims, as at the date of their appointment. Alternatively, it says the defendants are liable for the same damages in conversion.

In Douglas v Hello! Ltd [2006] QB 125 the magazine OK! contracted for the exclusive right to publish photographs of a celebrity wedding at which all other photography would be forbidden. The rival magazine Hello! published photographs which it knew to have been surreptitiously taken by an unauthorised photographer pretending to be a waiter or guest. OK! says that this was interference by unlawful means with its contractual or business relations or a breach of its equitable right to confidentiality in photographic images of the wedding.

In Mainstream Properties Ltd v Young [2005] IRLR 964 two employees of a property company, in breach of their contracts, diverted a development opportunity to a joint venture in which they were interested. The defendant, knowing of their duties but wrongly thinking that they would not be in breach, facilitated the acquisition by providing finance. The company says that he is liable for the tort of wrongfully inducing breach of contract.

== Judgment ==
Elaborating on the general principle that an agent cannot be sued for interfering with contractual relationships between a principal and another contracting party, Lord Hoffmann held that invalidly appointed receivers were not liable to the company for wrongful interference with contractual relations. Such a receiver acting in good faith employs no unlawful means and intends to cause no loss. Intangible property cannot be the subject of a claim for conversion.

On the tort of inducing or procuring breach of contract, there are five requirements: (1) there must be a contract (2) the contract must be breached (3) the defendant's conduct must have procured or induced the breach (4) the defendant must have known about the breached term or turned a blind eye to it, and (5) the defendant must have actually realised that the conduct procuring the breach would have that result.

The judgment was welcomed as providing "much needed clarity" in the field of economic torts, establishing that there is no single unified legal theory and the tort of inducing a breach of contract should be treated separately from the tort of causing loss by unlawful means. Hoffman J. argued that the unified theory had been "a source of confusion in more than one respect".

== See also ==
- Economic torts in English law
- Conversion (law)
- Torquay Hotel Co Ltd v Cousins [1969] 2 Ch 106
