= Morrow (surname) =

- Language: Gaelic

Origin
- Origin: Moireach, Moireabh
- Meaning: Coastal Settlement
- Region of origin: Ireland or Scotland

Other names
- Variant forms: Morrah, Murray, Moray, Murrow, MacMorrow, McMorrow, MacMurray

Morrow is an anglicized surname of Irish or Scottish origins.

== Scottish ==
Morrow is, ultimately, a variant of Murray. The older pronunciation of Murray (or Moray) in Scots was Morrah, which led to it being variously written down throughout Scottish history as Morrow, Morow, Morra, Murra, Morro, Morwe, Murrow, and Morrewe.

It was brought to Ireland by Scottish settlers during the Plantation of Ulster and is most common in those areas most heavily-settled by Scots, with the majority of Irish Morrows in 1901 and 1911 being Presbyterian. The name is still pronounced Morrah in much of Ulster today, but especially in those areas most heavily settled by Scots. The name was also taken to the American Colonies by Ulster Scots emigrants, who would become known as the Scotch-Irish. The interchangeability between the names Murray and Morrow is evident throughout Scottish, Irish, and American history.

- In the Parish of Seagoe, County Armagh, in 1704 Mary Murray was born to Jonathan Murray and his wife Elizabeth. Jonathan died in 1705 and was recorded as Jonathan Marra. When Mary married in the 1720s, her name was written Mary Murrah, with ‘Morrow’ written in brackets above it.
- In the Hearth Money Rolls for the Parish of Ballinderry, in County Antrim, the names Murray and Morrow are used interchangeably for the same men between 1666 and 1669. In 1666 one man is recorded as Adam Murray, but come 1669 the same man is found under Adam Morrow.
- Adam Murray was a soldier who fought during the Siege of Derry, and was the son of a Scot from Selkirkshire, who had settled in County Londonderry. Murray signed his name ‘Adam Morrow’ on a letter to King William and Queen Mary, after the relief of the siege.
- On a headstone in Colvend Kirkyard, in Kirkcudbrightshire, the inscription lists John Morrow (1734-1810) and his wife Janet Milbie (1736-1818), above their children James Murray, Robert Murray, and Mary Murray; a very clear example of the interchangeability of the two names. (In memory of John Morrow, who died at Dalbeattie the 4th May 1810, aged 76 years…Also of James Murray, their son, who died at Roughfurth on the 28th February 1852, aged 80 years…Robert Murray, died at Roughfourth, August 16th 1865, aged 63 years. Mary Murray, died at Kippford, 29th March 1887, aged 76 years).
- James Morow was a Scottish captain in the Danish-Norwegian Army between 1627 and 1628. He was part of Erskine’s Horse, and his name was variously spelt Morow, Morra, Marra, and Murray.
- In Poyntzpass, Co. Armagh, the name has been recorded under three spellings: Morrow, Morragh, and Murrow. In Griffith's Valuation, in 1864, William Morrow (1798-1864) was recorded in the townland of Druminargal as William Murrow; yet on his death registration (also in 1864) his name is William Morrow. His father, Alexander Morrow, was a farmer in the townland of Tullynacross, and appears in both the 1830 Tithe Applotment Books and the 1831 Map of the Manor of Acton. In 1865, also in Tullynacross, William Morrow (junior; 1837-1914) was recorded on a civil birth registration as William Morragh. On the baptismal register in Poyntzpass Presbyterian Church, however, his name is spelt William Morrow.
- Morayshire has also, on headstones and in diaries, been spelt ‘Morrowshire’; another example of this fluidity.
- As part of the emigration of Ulster Covenanters, led by Rev. William Martin, the passenger ship Lord Dunluce left Larne for Charleston, South Carolina, in December 1772. Amongst the passengers listed in Irish sources was David Murray. Upon arrival in Charleston, he appears as David Morrow.
- Hugh Morrah (1764-1837) of Abbeville, South Carolina, had his name variously spelt Morrow, Morrah, Marrah, and Morroh, throughout his life. His headstone reads 'Hugh Morah, Esquire'.

Some of the earliest recorded of the name were the Dumfries-born, Thomas Morrow, abbot of Paisley between 1418 and 1444, Duncan Morrow, witness to an ordination in 1503 at Kirkinner, Wigtownshire, Walter Morrow, a member of the convent at Kelso, Roxburghshire in 1548, Davy Morrow, bailie of Annan in 1592, and John Morrow & Christopher Morrow, two Scottish soldiers who were taken prisoner after the battle of Solway Moss in 1542.

== Irish ==
The name is suspected to have been used to anglicize a number of Irish Gaelic names, mainly surnames which include muir, meaning sea, which were also made as Morrogh, Murrow and Moroghoe. In Petty's Census of 1659, O'Morrow and McMarrowe are recorded. However, it is more common for these Irish names to have been anglicized as 'McMorrow' rather than the Scottish 'Morrow' on its own.

== Notable people ==
- Addie Morrow (fl. 1980s), Irish political figure
- Alan Morrow (1936–2023), Australian football player
- Albert Morrow (1863–1927), Irish artist and illustrator
- Alex Zander Morrow (born 1989), American entertainer
- Aneesah Morrow (born 2003), American basketball player
- Anna Karen Morrow (1914–2009), American model and actress
- Anne Morrow Lindbergh (1906–2001), American aviator, author, born Anne Spencer Morrow
- Anthony Morrow (born 1985), American basketball player
- Barry Morrow (born 1948), American screenwriter and film producer
- Bill Morrow (disambiguation), several people
- Black Morrow, the name attached to a bandit killed in medieval Scotland
- Bob Morrow (1946–2018), Canadian political figure
- Bob Morrow (American football) (1918–2003), American football player and coach
- Bobby Morrow (1935–2020), American track athlete
- Brad Morrow (1942–1997), American child actor
- Bradford Morrow (born 1951), American author
- Brandon Morrow (born 1984), American baseball player
- Brenden Morrow (born 1979), Canadian hockey player
- Bruce Morrow (born 1937), American radio personality
- Bruce Morrow (author) (born 1963), American writer
- Bruce Morrow (footballer) (born 1936), Australian football player
- Buddy Morrow (1919–2010), American musician
- Byron Morrow (1911–2006), American television and film actor
- Carla Morrow (born 1981), American fantasy artist
- Cecily Morrow, American figure skating coach
- Chris Morrow (born 1985), Northern Ireland footballer
- Cory Morrow (born 1972), American musician
- Clayton Morrow, (born 1974), American animator, son of Barry
- David Morrow (disambiguation), several people
- Don Morrow (1927–2020), American actor and radio personality
- Donald Morrow (1908–1995), Canadian political figure from Ontario
- Doretta Morrow (1928–1968), American actress and dancer
- Douglas Morrow (1913–1994), American screenwriter and film producer
- Dwight Morrow (1873–1931), American political figure
- E. Frederic Morrow (1906–1994), American political executive
- Edward Morrow (1934–2003), Transvaal-born Anglican priest and activist
- Edwin P. Morrow (1877–1935), American politician
- Elizabeth Cutter Morrow (1873–1955), American poet
- Ernest Morrow (1897–1949), Canadian military pilot
- Felix Morrow (1906–1988), American newspaper and book publisher
- Geoff Morrow (fl. 1970s), American songwriter
- George Morrow (disambiguation), several people
- Gertrude Comfort Morrow, American architect
- Gray Morrow (1934–2001), American artist and illustrator
- Hamilton Morrow (1846–1922), Canadian politician
- Harold Morrow (born 1973), American football player
- Honoré Willsie Morrow (1880–1940), American author and magazine editor
- Irving Morrow (1884–1952), American architect
- Jack Morrow (1872–1926), Northern Ireland illustrator and cartoonist
- James Morrow (disambiguation), several people
- Jay Johnson Morrow (1870–1937), American military figure and Governor of the Panama Canal Zone
- Jeff Morrow (1907–1993), American film actor
- Jeremiah Morrow (1771–1852), American political figure
- John Morrow (disambiguation), any of several men with the name
- Joseph John Morrow (born 1954), Scottish officer of arms
- Joseph McKeen Morrow (1832–1899), American politician
- Joshua Morrow (born 1974), American television actor
- Julian Morrow (born 1975), Australian comedian and television producer
- Juliet Morrow (born 1962), American archeologist and academic
- Justin Morrow (born 1987), American soccer player
- Karen Morrow (born 1936), American singer and stage actress
- Ken Morrow (born 1956), American hockey player
- Kevyn Morrow (fl. 1980–2000s), American actor
- Kirby Morrow (1973–2020), Canadian voice actor, comedian
- Lance Morrow (1939–2024), American academic and author
- Liza Morrow (fl. 1980s), American actress
- Lily Morrow (born 2002), Korean-Australian member of South Korean girl group Nmixx
- Margaret M. Morrow (born 1950), American jurist
- Mari Morrow (born 1974), Barbados-born American actress
- Mark Morrow (born 1960), Canadian politician
- Marlene Morrow (born 1954), American model
- Maurice Morrow, Baron Morrow (born 1948), Northern Ireland political figure
- Max Morrow (born 1991), Canadian actor
- Melvyn Morrow (born 1942), Australian playwright
- Michele Morrow (born 1978), American actress
- Monica Morrow (fl. 2000s), American surgeon
- Nellie Morrow Parker, American schoolteacher, born Nellie K. Morrow
- Neyle Morrow (1914–2006), American film and television actor
- Patricia Morrow (born 1944), American lawyer and actress
- Patrick Morrow (born 1952), Canadian photographer and mountaineer
- Philip Morrow (born 1962), Northern Ireland television producer
- Prince A. Morrow (1846–1913), American physician and education activist
- Rob Morrow (born 1962), American actor
- Robert Morrow (disambiguation), several people
- Robin Morrow (born 1942), Australian lecturer, author and editor
- Russell O. Morrow (1907–1984), American politician
- Sam Morrow (born 1985), Irish football player
- Scott Morrow (ice hockey, born 1969) (born 1969), American ice hockey player
- Scott Morrow (ice hockey, born 2002) (born 2002), American ice hockey player
- Simmone Morrow (born 1976), Australian softball player
- Steve Morrow (born 1970), Northern Irish footballer
- Susan Morrow (1931–1985), American actress
- Suzanne Morrow (1930–2008), Canadian figure skater
- Sydney Morrow (born 2004), American ice hockey player
- Terry Morrow (born 1963), American politician
- Thomas Morrow (Australian politician) (1888–1971), Australian politician
- Thomas Z. Morrow (1836–1913), American soldier and politician
- Tom Morrow (American football) (1938–2018), American football player
- Tom Morrow (footballer) (1923–2002), Australian football player
- Vic Morrow (1929–1982), American actor
- Vicki Morrow (fl. 1980s), American softball player
- Victoria Morrow (fl. 2000s), American television writer and producer
- W. C. Morrow (1854–1923), American author
- William Morrow (disambiguation), several people

== Fictional characters ==
- Caspar Morrow, fictional character in Invasion
- Clay Morrow, in the television series Sons of Anarchy
- Ernest Morrow, in the novel The Catcher in the Rye
- Captain Grace Morrow, in the video game Sea of Thieves
- Hisoka Morrow, antagonist in the manga Hunter X Hunter
- Jerome Morrow, in the film Gattaca
- Nicholas Morrow, in the novel series Sweet Valley High
- Odgen Morrow, co-creator of the OASIS and creator of the Egg Hunt in Ready Player One
- Regina Morrow, in the novel series Sweet Valley High
- T. O. Morrow, supervillain in the DC Comics universe

== See also ==
- Governor Morrow (disambiguation)
- Judge Morrow (disambiguation)
- Senator Morrow (disambiguation)
