= History of labor law in the United States =

History of labor law in the United States refers to the development of United States labor law, or legal relations between workers, their employers and trade unions in the United States of America.

== Pre-independence ==
The history of labor disputes in America substantially precedes the Revolutionary period. In 1636, for instance, there was a fishermen's strike on an island off the coast of Maine and in 1677 twelve carmen were fined for going on strike in New York City. However, most instances of labor unrest during the colonial period were temporary and isolated, and rarely resulted in the formation of permanent groups of laborers for negotiation purposes. Little legal recourse was available to those injured by the unrest, because strikes were not typically considered illegal. The only known case of criminal prosecution of workers in the colonial era occurred as a result of a carpenters' strike in Savannah, Georgia in 1746.

By the beginning of 19th-century, after the revolution, little had changed. The career path for most artisans still involved apprenticeship under a master, followed by moving into independent production. However, over the course of the Industrial Revolution, this model rapidly changed, particularly in the major metropolitan areas. For instance, in Boston in 1790, the vast majority of the 1,300 artisans in the city described themselves as "master workman". By 1815, journeymen workers without independent means of production had displaced these "masters" as the majority. By that time journeymen also outnumbered masters in New York City and Philadelphia. This shift occurred as a result of large-scale transatlantic and rural-urban migration. Migration into the coastal cities created a larger population of potential laborers, which in turn allowed controllers of capital to invest in labor-intensive enterprises on a larger scale. Craft workers found that these changes launched them into competition with each other to a degree that they had not experienced previously, which limited their opportunities and created substantial risks of downward mobility that had not existed prior to that time.

== Nineteenth century ==
=== Slavery and abolition ===
- Compromise of 1850
- Dred Scott v. Sandford
- Arizona Organic Act abolished slavery on February 24, 1863
- Emancipation Proclamation
- Thirteenth Amendment

=== Illegality of unions ===
These conditions led to the first labor combination cases in America. Over the first half of the 19th century, there are twenty-three known cases of indictment and prosecution for criminal conspiracy, taking place in six states: Pennsylvania, Maryland, New York, Louisiana, Massachusetts and Virginia. The central question in these cases was invariably whether workmen in combination would be permitted to use their collective bargaining power to obtain benefits—increased wages, decreased hours, or improved conditions—which were beyond their ability to obtain as individuals. The cases overwhelmingly resulted in convictions. However, in most instances the plaintiffs' desire was to establish favorable precedent, not to impose harsh penalties, and the fines were typically modest.

One of the central themes of the cases prior to the landmark decision in Commonwealth v. Hunt, which settled the legality of unions, was the applicability of the English common law in post-revolutionary America. Whether the English common law applied—and in particular whether the common law notion that a conspiracy to raise wages was illegal applied—was frequently the subject of debate between the defense and the prosecution. For instance, in Commonwealth v. Pullis, a case in 1806 against a combination of journeymen cordwainers in Philadelphia for conspiracy to raise their wages, the defense attorneys referred to the common law as arbitrary and unknowable and instead praised the legislature as the embodiment of the democratic promise of the revolution. In ruling that a combination to raise wages was per se illegal, Recorder Moses Levy strongly disagreed, writing that "[t]he acts of the legislature form but a small part of that code from which the citizen is to learn his duties . . . [i]t is in the volumes of the common law we are to seek for information in the far greater number, as well as the most important causes that come before our tribunals."

As a result of the spate of convictions against combinations of laborers, the typical narrative of early American labor law states that, prior to Hunt in Massachusetts in 1842, peaceable combinations of workingmen to raise wages, shorten hours or ensure employment, were illegal in the United States, as they had been under English common law. In England, criminal conspiracy laws were first held to include combinations in restraint of trade in the Court of Star Chamber early in the 17th century. The precedent was solidified in 1721 by R v Journeymen-Taylors of Cambridge, which found tailors guilty of a conspiracy to raise wages. Leonard Levy went so far as to refer to Hunt as the "Magna Carta of American trade-unionism," illustrating its perceived standing as the major point of divergence in the American and English legal treatment of unions which, "removed the stigma of criminality from labor organizations."

However, case law in American prior to Hunt was mixed. Pullis was actually unusual in strictly following the English common law and holding that a combination to raise wages was by itself illegal. More often combination cases prior to Hunt did not hold that unions were illegal per se, but rather found some other justification for a conviction. After Pullis in 1806, eighteen other prosecutions of laborers for conspiracies followed within the next three decades. However, only one such case, People v. Fisher, also held that a combination for the purpose of raising wages was illegal. Several other cases held that the methods used by the unions, rather than the unions themselves, were illegal. For instance, in People v. Melvin, cordwainers were again convicted of a conspiracy to raise wages. Unlike in Pullis, however, the court held that the combination's existence itself was not unlawful, but nevertheless reached a conviction because the cordwainers had refused to work for any master who paid lower wages, or with any laborer who accepted lower wages, than what the combination had stipulated. The court held that methods used to obtain higher wages would be unlawful if they were judged to be deleterious to the general welfare of the community. Commonwealth v. Morrow continued to refine this standard, stating that, "an agreement of two or more to the prejudice of the rights of others or of society" would be illegal. Another line of cases, led by Justice John Gibson of the Supreme Court Pennsylvania's decision in Commonwealth v. Carlisle, held that motive of the combination, rather than simply its existence, was the key to illegality. Gibson wrote, "Where the act is lawful for an individual, it can be the subject of a conspiracy, when done in concert, only where there is a direct intention that injury shall result from it." Still other courts rejected Pullis' rule of per se illegality in favor of a rule that asked whether the combination was a but-for cause of injury. Thus, as economist Edwin Witte stated, "[T]he doctrine that a combination to raise wages is illegal was allowed to die by common consent. No leading case was required for its overthrow." Nevertheless, while Hunt was not the first case to hold that labor combinations were legal, it was the first to do so explicitly and in clear terms.

=== Legalisation of unions ===
- Thirteenth Amendment
- Commonwealth v. Pullis (1806) or the Philadelphia Cordwainers case, holding unions were criminal conspiracies
- Commonwealth v. Hunt (1842), holding that workers have the right to organize and strike.
- Horace Gray Wood, Master and Servant (1877)

== Antitrust and the Lochner era ==
- Sherman Act 1890
- Adamson Act 1916
- Arbitration Act 1888
- Erdman Act 1898, precursor to the Railway Labor Act 1926
- Railroad Transportation Act 1920, privatized the railroads and established the Railroad Labor Board
- In re Debs, 158 U.S. 564 (1895) upheld a federal injunction for workers to return to work and held Eugene Debs in contempt of court for continuing to organize the Pullman Strike
- Vegelahn v. Guntner, 167 Mass. 92 (1896) Oliver Wendell Holmes Jr. dissenting in the Massachusetts Supreme Court, argued that organisation on the worker side is necessary to counter combination on the side of capital, if the market is to work fairly.
- Loewe v. Lawlor 208 U.S. 274 (1908) or The Danbury Hatters' case
- Lochner v. New York, 198 U.S. 45 (1905)
- Adair v. United States, 208 U.S. 161 (1908) upholding yellow dog contracts, agreements to not join a union
- Coppage v. Kansas, 236 U.S. 1 (1915) also upholding yellow dog contracts
- Muller v. Oregon, 208 U.S. 412 (1908) found that an Oregon statute that a 10-hour maximum day for women was constitutional, with the downside that this justified sex discrimination. The "Brandeis Brief" with social scientific evidence helped win the case.
- Gompers v. Buck's Stove and Range Co., 221 U.S. 418 (1911) Samuel Gompers was sentenced to prison after a union's strike was declared unlawful and an injunction granted, but the convictions were overturned on procedural grounds
- Commission on Industrial Relations (1915)
- Clayton Act of 1914
- Bunting v. Oregon, 243 U.S. 426 (1917) in a change of policy, the US Supreme Court held the 10-hour working day was constitutional
- Debs v. United States, 249 U.S. 211 (1919) after Eugene Debs protested World War I publicly he was arrested under the Espionage Act of 1917 and the Supreme Court held this was lawful. Debs won a large number of votes as a Socialist candidate while he was in prison. He was pardoned and released in 1921 after repeal of the Acts.
- Hammer v. Dagenhart, 247 U.S. 251 (1918) 5 to 4 that the Keating-Owen Act of 1916 which prohibited child labor was unconstitutional, if the articles might never reach inter-state trade
- Duplex Printing Press Co. v. Deering, 41 S. Ct. 172 (1921) even after the Clayton Act 1914, a secondary boycott remained an unlawful restraint of trade. (This was reversed by the NLRA 1935, but reintroduced by LMRA 1947)
- Adkins v. Children's Hospital, 261 U.S. 525 (1923) Supreme Court held a minimum wage for women and children in DC was unconstitutional, overturned by Parrish

== Modern labor law ==
- Railway Labor Act of 1926
- Norris–La Guardia Act of 1932
- Apex Hosiery Co. v. Leader, 310 U.S. 469 (1940)
- United States v. Hutcheson, 312 US 219 (1941)
- National Industrial Recovery Act 1933, declared unconstitutional
- National Labor Relations Act of 1935
- National Labor Relations Board v. Jones & Laughlin Steel Corporation, 301 U.S. 1 (1937) declaring the NLRA 1935 to be constitutional
- Hague v. Committee for Industrial Organization, 307 U.S. 496 (1939) held to be a violation of the First Amendment for the NJ mayor to shut down trade union CIO meetings because he thought they were "communist"
- Fair Labor Standards Act of 1938, minimum wage and overtime
- West Coast Hotel Co. v. Parrish, 300 U.S. 379 (1937) upholding the legality of the minimum wage, reversing Adkins
- United States v. Darby Lumber Co., 312 U.S. 100 (1941) held that all labor standards could be regulated consistently with the Commerce Clause, reversing Hammer
- Fair Employment Practices Commission (1941)
- Employment Act of 1946

== Post-war regulation ==
- Smith–Connally Act 1943, prohibited use of union contributions directly for political campaigns, though it could be indirect. Made permanent by the Taft–Hartley Act
- Labor Management Relations Act of 1947 or the Taft–Hartley Act, no secondary action, closed shop, enforceable collective agreements
- Labor Management Reporting and Disclosure Act of 1959 or the Landrum–Griffin Act, union elections, fiduciary duties of leaders

== Civil rights movement ==
- Equal Pay Act of 1963
- Civil Rights Act of 1964
- Age Discrimination in Employment Act of 1967
- Geduldig v. Aiello, 417 U.S. 484 (1974) refusing to extend the Equal Protection Clause to pregnant women
- Pregnancy Discrimination Act 1978

== Legislation in the 1970s ==
- Occupational Safety and Health Act of 1970, health and safety and whistleblowing
- Employee Retirement Income Security Act of 1974, private pension minimum standards and fiduciary duties
- Title VII of the Civil Service Reform Act of 1978, established collective bargaining rights for most employees of the federal government
- Humphrey–Hawkins Full Employment Act of 1978
- Labor Reform Act of 1977, never enacted amendments to the NLRA 1935

== Post 1970s ==
- Americans with Disabilities Act of 1990
- Family and Medical Leave Act of 1993, 12 weeks unpaid parental leave after 12 months work over 50 employees
- Worker Adjustment and Retraining Notification Act of 1988 (WARN Act)
- Employee Free Choice Act (introduced in Congress in 2009; did not pass)

== See also ==
- United States labor law
- Labor trafficking in the United States
- History of unfree labor in the United States

History:

- Labor history of the United States
- History of labour law in the United Kingdom
