= Morrow =

Morrow may refer to:

== Places in the United States ==
- Morrow, Arkansas, an unincorporated community and census-designated place
- Morrow, Georgia, a city
- Morrow, Louisiana, an unincorporated community and census-designated place
- Morrow, Ohio, a village
- Morrow County, Ohio
- Morrow County, Oregon
- Morrow Township, Washington County, Arkansas
- Morrow Township, Adair County, Missouri
- Morrow Township, Macon County, Missouri
- Morrow Mountain State Park, which includes a peak in Stanly County, North Carolina
- Morrow Mountain (New York), a peak in Madison County
- Jesse Morrow Mountain, a peak in Fresno County, California
- Morrow Island, California
- Morrow Creek, Lansing, New York
- Fort Morrow Army Airfield, Alaska, a World War II airfield
- Fort Morrow, now in Delaware State Park, a War of 1812 fort, on the National Register of Historic Places

== People and fictional characters ==
- Morrow (surname)
- Morrow Massey (1906–1966), American Negro league outfielder

== Schools in the United States ==
- Morrow High School (Georgia)
- Dwight Morrow High School, Englewood, New Jersey
- Elisabeth Morrow School, Englewood, New Jersey
- John Morrow Elementary School, Pittsburgh, Pennsylvania, on the National Register of Historic Places

== Companies ==
- Morrow Aircraft Corporation, a defunct American aircraft manufacturing company
- William Morrow and Company, an American publishing house, now an imprint of HarperCollins
- Morrow Designs, an American manufacturer of laptop computer Morrow Pivot II and numerous early-1980s microcomputers
- Morrow Snowboards, a manufacturer owned by K2 Sports

== Other uses ==
- "Morrow" (song), a recording by Japanese group Dragon Ash
- SS Dwight W. Morrow, a World War II Liberty ship
- Morrow priest, a cleric paid to say mass daily for the laity, especially in a chantry church
- Morrow procedure, a surgical method for treating hypertrophic obstructive cardiomyopathy

== See also ==
- Morrow Hall, Batesville, Arkansas, on the National Register of Historic Places
- Morrow House (disambiguation), several historic buildings in the United States
- Morrow Pivot II, an early laptop computer
- Commonwealth v. Morrow, a Pennsylvania labor law case
- Morrow County Airport, near Mount Gilead, Ohio
- Lonicera morrowii, also known as Morrow's honeysuckle, a shrub
- Morrowland, a fictional island in Michael Ende's children stories
