= Bruce Morrow (disambiguation) =

Bruce Morrow (born 1935 or 1937) is an American radio host.

Bruce Morrow may also refer to:

- Bruce Morrow (soccer) (born 1936), Australian footballer
- Bruce Morrow (author) (born 1963), American writer
