= Morrow House =

Morrow House may refer to:

- Morrow-Hudson House, Tempe, Arizona, listed on the NRHP in Maricopa County, Arizona
- Morrow Hall, Batesville, Arkansas, listed on the NRHP in Independence County, Arkansas
- James Morrow House, Newark, Delaware, listed on the National Register of Historic Places in New Castle County
- Morrow House (Somerset, Kentucky), listed on the National Register of Historic Places in Pulaski County, Kentucky
- Johnson Morrow House, Callao, Missouri, listed on the National Register of Historic Places in Macon County, Missouri
- Royal and Louise Morrow House, Brevard, North Carolina, listed on the National Register of Historic Places in Transylvania County, North Carolina
- William P. Morrow House, Graham, North Carolina, listed on the National Register of Historic Places in Alamance County, North Carolina
- Morrow-Overman-Fairley House, Hillsboro, Ohio, listed on the National Register of Historic Places in Highland County, Ohio
