= Morrow Mountain =

Morrow Mountain may refer to:

- Morrow Mountain State Park, which includes a peak in Stanly County, North Carolina
- Morrow Mountain (New York), a peak in Madison County, New York
- Jesse Morrow Mountain, a peak in Fresno County, California
