= Melissa Albert =

American author of YA fiction

- Citizenship: United States
- Education: University of Iowa; Columbia College Chicago
- Occupation: Novelist
- Writing career
- Language: English
- Genre: Young adult fiction

Melissa Albert is an American author of young adult fiction.

== Early life ==
Melissa Albert is from Illinois and attended the University of Iowa and Columbia College Chicago where she studied journalism. She was a managing editor at Barnes and Noble when she decided to write her first novel, a fairy tale noir for young adults.

== Writing career ==
Her debut novel, The Hazel Wood, was on The New York Times Best Seller list for 36 weeks. It received starred reviews from Publishers Weekly, School Library Journal and Kirkus Reviews. It was named a best young adult book of the year by Kirkus. Film rights were optioned by Sony Pictures, with Ashleigh Powell reportedly slated to adapt the screenplay.

The sequel, The Night Country, was published in 2020. It received a starred review from School Library Journal.

== Personal life ==
Albert is married and has one child. She lives in Brooklyn.

== Bibliography ==
=== The Hazel Wood series ===
- —— (2018). The Hazel Wood (hardcover 1st ed.). Flatiron Books. pp. 1–359. ISBN 9781250147905. Illustrated by Jim Tierney.
- —— (2020). The Night Country (hardcover 1st ed.). Flatiron Books. pp. 1–331. ISBN 9781250246073.
- —— (2021). Tales from the Hinterland (hardcover 1st ed.). Flatiron Books. pp. 1–240. ISBN 9781250302724.

=== Other works ===
- —— (2022). Our Crooked Hearts (hardcover 1st ed.). Flatiron Books. pp. 1–341. ISBN 9781250826367.
- —— (February 20, 2024). The Bad Ones. Flatiron Books. pp. 1–400. ISBN 9781250894892.
- —— (2026). The Children (hardcover 1st ed.). William Morrow. pp. 1–416. ISBN 9780063487437.
