= Willhite =

Willhite is a surname. It may refer to:

- Debbie Willhite (born 1951), U.S. political consultant and activist
- Gerald Willhite (born 1959), U.S. football player
- Kevin Willhite (born 1963), U.S. football player
- Matt Willhite (born 1971), U.S. politician
- Nellie Zabel Willhite (1892–1991), U.S. Pilot
- Nick Willhite (1941–2008), U.S. baseball player
