= Commonwealth v. Pullis =

Commonwealth v. Pullis, 3 Doc. Hist. 59 (1806), was a US labor law case, and the first reported case arising from a labor strike in the United States. It decided that striking workers were illegal conspirators.

== Facts ==
In 1794, Philadelphia shoemakers organized the "Federal Society of Journeymen Cordwainers" (the name came from the cordovan leather they worked with) in an effort to secure stable wages. Over the next decade, the union secured some wage increases. Through 1804, the Journeymen received moderate wage increases. In 1805, the union struck for higher wages. The strike collapsed after the union leaders were indicted for the crime of conspiracy.

== Trial ==
The jury trial was in the Philadelphia Mayor’s Court, which was not a court of record. The only report historians have today consists of shorthand notes by Thomas Lloyd, a young Jeffersonian printer who later published the proceedings.

Eight leaders of the Federal Society of Journeymen Cordwainers were brought to trial and accused of conspiring to increase their pay rates after leading an unsuccessful strike for higher wages. The employers, not the government, paid the prosecution's expenses. The arguments in Pullis promoted the idea '"that workers were transitory, irresponsible, and dangerous", and were, thus, properly the subject of judicial control.

== Judgment ==
After a three-day trial, the jury found the defendants guilty of "a combination to raise their wages". The union of Philadelphia Journeymen Shoemakers was convicted of and bankrupted by charges of criminal conspiracy. The defendants were fined US$8 each (the cost of one week's wages) and made to pay the costs of the suit.

The law established in this case, that labor unions are illegal conspiracies, would remain the law until Commonwealth v. Hunt, tried in Massachusetts Supreme Judicial Court.

== See also ==
- US labor law
- Commonwealth v. Hunt, Massachusetts ruling deciding strikes were not a conspiracy
