= Senator Morrow =

Senator Morrow may refer to:

== Members of the United States Senate ==
- Dwight Morrow (1873–1931), U.S. Senator from New Jersey from 1930 to 1931
- Jeremiah Morrow (1771–1852), U.S. Senator from Ohio from 1813 to 1819

== United States state senate members ==
- Bill Morrow (California politician) (born 1954), California State Senate
- Russell O. Morrow (1907–1984), Florida State Senate
- Thomas Z. Morrow (1835–1913), Kentucky State Senate

== See also ==
- Mallory McMorrow (born 1986), Michigan State Senate
