= Vegelahn v. Guntner =

American legal case

Vegelahn v. Guntner, 167 Mass. 92 (1896) is a United States labor law decision from the Supreme Judicial Court of Massachusetts. It is noted for its famous dissent, written by Oliver Wendell Holmes, Jr., rather than its majority opinion.

== Facts ==
The union had picketed in front of the employer's business with the object of persuading current employees and job applicants to not enter the building. The union also picketed to pressure workers to break employment contracts with the company. The objective was to force higher wages. The company successfully sought an injunction in court, under the doctrine of intentional interference with contract, and alleged that the union was tortiously interfering with the relations between management and worker. Employers frequently resorted to state and federal courts to get restraining orders and injunctions to stop picketing, strikes, and boycotts.

== Judgment ==
On appeal from the trial court, Justice Allen held that the coercion and intimidation found to have occurred interfered with the right of an employer to hire whom it pleases, and the right of workers to enter into employment. The court ruled that the union was guilty of an intentional tort.

Justice Holmes disagreed, equating the use of collective force by workers to the corporate use of force to compete.

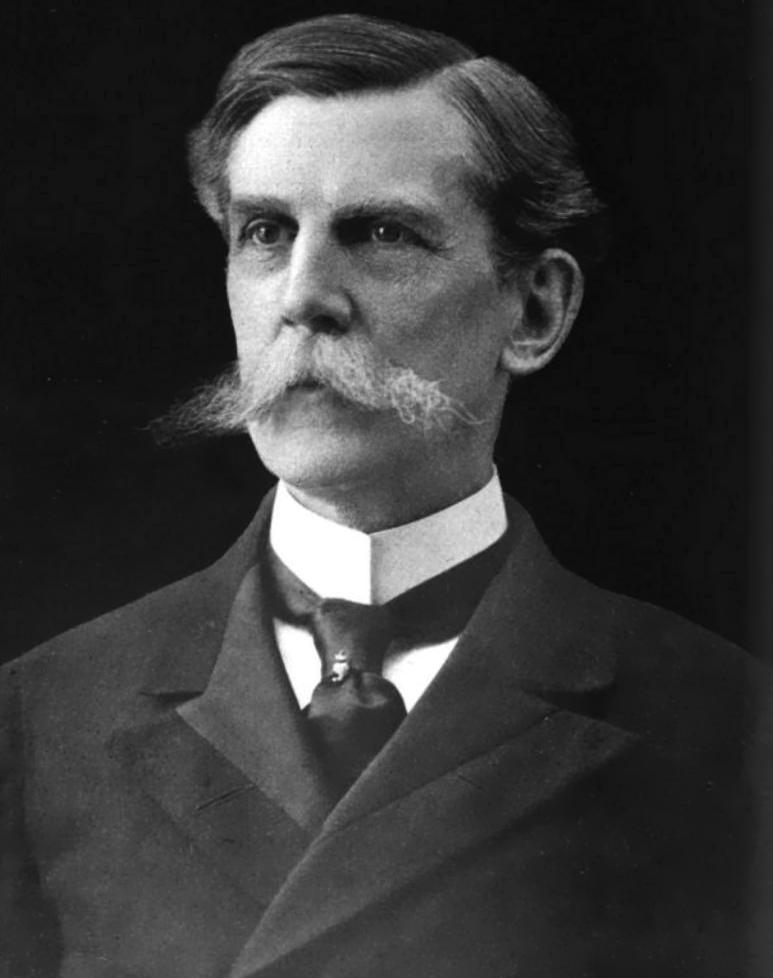
Justice Oliver Wendell Holmes was soon elevated to the US Supreme Court, where he was one of the longest serving judges in history.

In a case like the present, it seems to me that, whatever the true result may be, it will be of advantage to sound thinking to have the less popular view of the law stated, and therefore, although when I have been unable to bring my brethren to share my convictions my almost invariable practice is to defer to them in silence, I depart from that practice in this case, notwithstanding my unwillingness to do so in support of an already rendered judgment of my own.

In the first place, a word or two should be said as to the meaning of the report. I assume that my brethren construe it as I meant it to be construed, and that, if they were not prepared to do so, they would give an opportunity to the defendants to have it amended in accordance with what I state my meaning to have been. There was no proof of any threat or danger of a patrol exceeding two men, and as, of course, an injunction is not granted except with reference to what there is reason to expect in its absence, the question on that point is whether a patrol of two men should be enjoined. Again, the defendants are enjoined by the final decree from intimidating by threats, express or implied, of physical harm to body or property, any person who may be desirous of entering into the employment of the plaintiff, so far as to prevent him from entering the same. In order to test the correctness of the refusal to go further, it must be assumed that the defendants obey the express prohibition of the decree. If they do not, they fall within the injunction as it now stands, and are liable to summary punishment. The important difference between the preliminary and the final injunction is that the former goes further, and forbids the defendants to interfere with the plaintiff's business "by any scheme organized for the purpose of preventing any person or persons who now are or may hereafter be desirous of entering the [plaintiff's employment] from entering it." I quote only a part, and the part which seems to me most objectionable. This includes refusal of social intercourse, and even organized persuasion or argument, although free from any threat of violence, either express or implied. And this is with reference to persons who have a legal right to contract or not to contract with the plaintiff, as they may see fit. Interference with existing contracts is forbidden by the final decree. I wish to insist a little that the only point of difference which involves a difference of principle between the final decree and the preliminary injunction, which it is proposed to restore, is what I have mentioned, in order that it may be seen exactly what we are to discuss. It appears to me that the opinion of the majority turns in part on the assumption that the patrol necessarily carries with it a threat of bodily harm. That assumption I think unwarranted, for the reasons which I have given. Furthermore, it cannot be said, I think, that two men, walking together up and down a sidewalk, and speaking to those who enter a certain shop, do necessarily and always thereby convey a threat of force. I do not think it possible to discriminate, and to say that two workmen, or even two representatives of an organization of workmen, do; especially when they are, and are known to be, under the injunction of this court not to do so. See Stimson, Labor Law, § 60, especially pages 290, 298-300; Reg. v. Shepherd, 11 Cox, Cr.Cas. 325. I may add that I think the more intelligent workingmen believe as fully as I do that they no more can be permitted to usurp the state's prerogative of force than can their opponents in their controversies. But, if I am wrong, then the decree as it stands reaches the patrol, since it applies to all threats of force. With this I pass to the real difference between the interlocutory and the final decree.

I agree, whatever may be the law in the case of a single defendant (Rice v. Albee, 164 Mass. 88, 41 N.E. 122), that when a plaintiff proves that several persons have combined and conspired to injure his business, and have done acts producing that effect, he shows temporal damage and a cause of action, unless the facts disclose or the defendants prove some ground of excuse or justification; and I take it to be settled, and rightly settled, that doing that damage by combined persuasion is actionable, as well as doing it by falsehood or by force. Walker v. Cronin, 107 Mass. 555; Morasse v. Brochu, 151 Mass. 567, 25 N.E. 74; Tasker v. Stanley, 153 Mass. 148, 26 N.E. 417. Nevertheless, in numberless instances the law warrants the intentional infliction of temporal damage, because it regards it as justified. It is on the question of what shall amount to a justification, and more especially on the nature of the considerations which really determine or ought to determine the answer to that question, that judicial reasoning seems to me often to be inadequate. The true grounds of decision are considerations of policy and of social advantage, and it is vain to suppose that solutions can be attained merely by logic and general propositions of law which nobody disputes. Propositions as to public policy rarely are unanimously accepted, and still more rarely, if ever, are capable of unanswerable proof. They require a special training to enable any one even to form an intelligent opinion about them. In the early stages of law, at least, they generally are acted on rather as inarticulate instincts than as definite ideas, for which a rational defense is ready.

To illustrate what I have said in the last paragraph: It has been the law for centuries that a man may set up a business in a small country town, too small to support more than one, although thereby he expects and intends to ruin some one already there, and succeeds in his intent. In such a case he is not held to act "unlawfully and without justifiable cause," as was alleged in Walker v. Cronin and Rice v. Albee. The reason, of course, is that the doctrine generally has been accepted that free competition is worth more to society than it costs, and that on this ground the infliction of the damage is privileged. Commonwealth v. Hunt, 4 Metc. (Mass.) 111, 134. Yet even this proposition nowadays is disputed by a considerable body of persons, including many whose intelligence is not to be denied, little as we may agree with them. I have chosen this illustration partly with reference to what I have to say next. It shows without the need of further authority that the policy of allowing free competition justifies the intentional inflicting of temporal damage, including the damage of interference with a man's business by some means, when the damage is done, not for its own sake, but as an instrumentality in reaching the end of victory in the battle of trade. In such a case it cannot matter whether the plaintiff is the only rival of the defendant, and so is aimed at specially, or is one of a class all of whom are hit. The only debatable ground is the nature of the means by which such damage may be inflicted. We all agree that it cannot be done by force or threats of force. We all agree, I presume, that it may be done by persuasion to leave a rival's shop, and come to the defendant's. It may be done by the refusal or withdrawal of various pecuniary advantages, which, apart from this consequence, are within the defendant's lawful control. It may be done by the withdrawal of, or threat to withdraw, such advantages from third persons who have a right to deal or not to deal with the plaintiff, as a means of inducing them not to deal with him either as customers or servants. Commonwealth v. Hunt, 4 Metc. (Mass.) 111, 112, 133; Bowen v. Matheson, 14 Allen, 499; Heywood v. Tillson, 75 Me. 225; Steamship Co. v. McGregor [1892] App.Cas. 25. I have seen the suggestion made that the conflict between employers and employed was not competition. But I venture to assume that none of my brethren would rely on that suggestion. If the policy on which our law is founded is too narrowly expressed in the term "free competition," we may substitute "free struggle for life." Certainly, the policy is not limited to struggles between persons of the same class, competing for the same end. It applies to all conflicts of temporal interests.

I pause here to remark that the word "threats" often is used as if, when it appeared that threats had been made, it appeared that unlawful conduct had begun. But it depends on what you threaten. As a general rule, even if subject to some exceptions, what you may do in a certain event you may threaten to do-- that is, give warning of your intention to do--in that event, and thus allow the other person the chance of avoiding the consequence. So, as to "compulsion," it depends on how you "compel." Commonwealth v. Hunt, 4 Metc. (Mass.) 111, 133. So as to "annoyance" or "intimidation." Connor v. Kent, Curran v. Treleaven, 17 Cox, Cr.Cas. 354, 367, 368, 370. In Sherry v. Perkins, 147 Mass. 212, 17 N.E. 307, it was found as a fact that the display of banners which was enjoined was part of a scheme to prevent workmen from entering or remaining in the plaintiff's employment, "by threats and intimidation." The context showed that the words as there used meant threats of personal violence and intimidation by causing fear of it. So far, I suppose, we are agreed. But there is a notion, which latterly has been insisted on a good deal, that a combination of persons to do what any one of them lawfully might do by himself will make the otherwise lawful conduct unlawful. It would be rash to say that some as yet unformulated truth may not be hidden under this proposition. But, in the general form in which it has been presented and accepted by many courts. I think it plainly untrue, both on authority and principle. Commonwealth v. Hunt, 4 Metc. (Mass.) 111; Randall v. Hazelton, 12 Allen, 412, 414. There was combination of the most flagrant and dominant kind in Bowen v. Matheson, and in the Steamship Co. Case, and combination was essential to the success achieved. But it is not necessary to cite cases. It is plain from the slightest consideration of practical affairs, or the most superficial reading of industrial history, that free competition means combination, and that the organization of the world, now going on so fast, means an ever-increasing might and scope of combination. It seems to me futile to set our faces against this tendency. Whether beneficial on the whole, as I think it, or detrimental, it is inevitable, unless the fundamental axioms of society, and even the fundamental conditions of life, are to be changed.

One of the eternal conflicts out of which life is made up is that between the effort of every man to get the most he can for his services, and that of society, disguised under the name of capital, to get his services for the least possible return. Combination on the one side is patent and powerful. Combination on the other is the necessary and desirable counterpart, if the battle is to be carried on in a fair and equal way. I am unable to reconcile Temperton v. Russell [1893] 1 Q.B. 715, and the cases which follow it, with the Steamship Co. Case. But Temperton v. Russell is not a binding authority here, and therefore I do not think it necessary to discuss it. If it be true that workingmen may combine with a view, among other things, to getting as much as they can for their labor, just as capital may combine with a view to getting the greatest possible return, it must be true that, when combined, they have the same liberty that combined capital has, to support their interests by argument, persuasion, and the bestowal or refusal of those advantages which they otherwise lawfully control. I can remember when many people thought that, apart from violence or breach of contract, strikes were wicked, as organized refusals to work. I suppose that intelligent economists and legislators have given up that notion today. I feel pretty confident that they equally will abandon the idea that an organized refusal by workmen of social intercourse with a man who shall enter their antagonist's employ is unlawful, if it is dissociated from any threat of violence, and is made for the sole object of prevailing, if possible, in a contest with their employer about the rate of wages. The fact that the immediate object of the act by which the benefit to themselves is to be gained is to injure their antagonist does not necessarily make it unlawful, any more than when a great house lowers the price of goods for the purpose and with the effect of driving a smaller antagonist from the business. Indeed, the question seems to me to have been decided as long ago as 1842, by the good sense of Chief Justice Shaw, in Commonwealth v. Hunt, 4 Metc. (Mass.) 111. I repeat at the end, as I said at the beginning, that this is the point of difference in principle, and the only one, between the interlocutory and final decree; and I only desire to add that the distinctions upon which the final decree was framed seem to me to have coincided very accurately with the results finally reached by legislation and judicial decision in England, apart from what I must regard as the anomalous decisions of Temperton v. Russell and the cases which have followed it. Reg. v. Shepherd, 11 Cox, Cr.Cas. 325; Connor v. Kent, Gibson v. Lawson, and Curran v. Treleaven, 17 Cox, Cr.Cas. 354.

The general question of the propriety of dealing with this kind of case by injunction I say nothing about, because I understand that the defendants have no objection to the final decree if it goes no further, and that both parties wish a decision upon the matters which I have discussed.

This was one of the first occasions when any judge of prominence had made such a declaration.

== Significance ==
The Vegelahn case was decided in 1896, when immigration was steadily increasing and union membership was also increasing. The public had witnessed violent and far-flung labor unrest with the Pullman Strike, the Homestead, Pennsylvania violence between steel workers and Carnegie Steel, and the Haymarket riot in Chicago. It would be another 25 years before the law would catch up to Holmes's dissent, with the passage of the federal Anti-Injunction Act (Norris-LaGuardia Act).
