= John Morrow =

John Morrow may refer to:

- John Morrow (American football) (1933–2017), American football player
- John Morrow (footballer) (born 1971), Irish footballer
- John Morrow (New Mexico politician) (1865–1935), U.S. representative from New Mexico
- John Morrow, Dean of the University of Auckland Faculty of Arts
- John Morrow (peace activist) (1931–2009), Northern Irish peace activist
- John Morrow (Virginia politician), U.S. representative from Virginia, 1805–1809
- John H. Morrow (1910–2000), American diplomat
- John Morrow (writer) (1930–2014), Northern Ireland short story writer and novelist
- John H. Morrow Jr., American historian and professor
- John Morrow, American writer and proprietor of TwoMorrows Publishing
- Jack Morrow (1872–1926), Irish cartoonist and painter

== See also ==
- John Simms (clergyman), Northern Irish politician
- Morrow (disambiguation)
