= Lyon College =

Presbyterian college in Batesville, Arkansas, US

- Former name: Arkansas College (1872–1994)
- Motto: Latin: Perseverantia Omnia Vincet Deo Volente
- Motto in English: Perseverance Conquers All, God Willing.
- Type: Private college
- Established: 1872; 154 years ago
- Religious affiliation: Presbyterian
- Academic affiliations: APCU; CONAHEC; NAICU; Space-grant
- President: Melissa Taverner
- Faculty: 61
- Students: 781 (Fall 2025)
- Location: Batesville, Arkansas, United States; 35°46′40″N 91°37′33″W
- Campus: Rural town, 136 acres (0.55 km^{2})
- Colors: Crimson, Navy Blue & Gold
- Nickname: Scots
- Sporting affiliations: NCAA Division III – SLIAC (primary)
- Website: lyon.edu
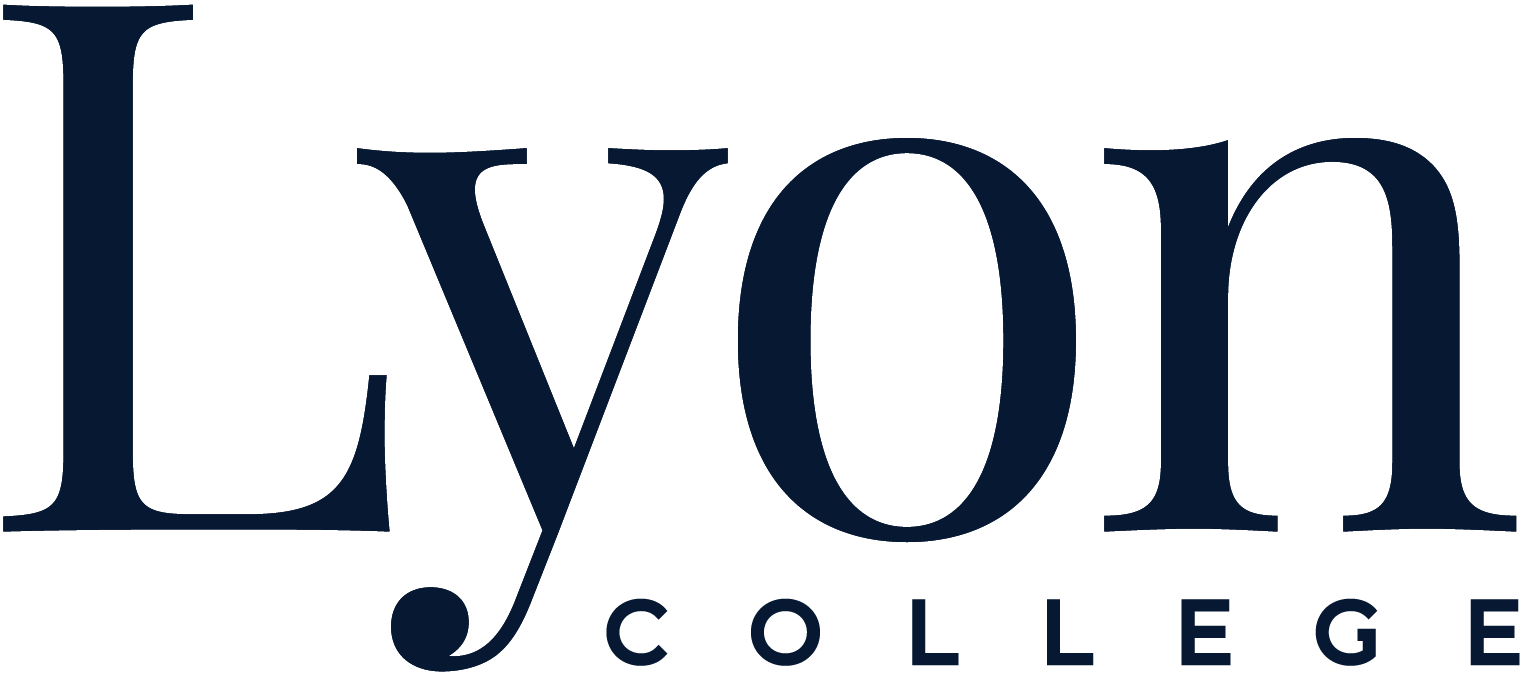

Lyon College is a private liberal arts college affiliated with the Presbyterian Church and located in Batesville, Arkansas. Founded in 1872 as Arkansas College, it is the oldest independent college in Arkansas.

== History ==
Located in Batesville, Arkansas, the college was founded in 1872 and is the oldest independent college in Arkansas. It was founded by Isaac J. Long who served as its first president. He was succeeded by his son E. R. Long and then by a Mr. Cleland.

In 1871, state leaders narrowed down choices for the potential flagship location of a state college to either Fayetteville or Batesville. Fayetteville and Washington County residents collaboratively offered financial backing to establish the college in Fayetteville, and Batesville ultimately lost the bid. However, Rev. Isaac J. Long, along with others involved with the Presbyterian church, decided to open a college soon after. They named Arkansas College at Batesville. The charter was signed by Governor Ozra Amander Hadley on October 24, 1872. Morrow Hall was the college's first permanent building, occupied in 1873. The Long family led the college until Dr. Paul M. McCain became president of the college in 1952.

It was renamed Lyon College in 1994, after the Lyon family of Arkansas. Frank Lyon Sr. served on the board of trustees from 1946 to 1988, including as chairman from 1977 to 1987. Frank Lyon Jr. served on the board for more than 30 years, until his death in 2015. He served as chair of the board for four years. Frank Lyon Jr. and Jane Lyon gave the largest gift in the college's history of $10 million.

W. Joseph King became president in July 2017. King succeeded Donald V. Weatherman, who served as president from 2009 until he retired in 2017. Melissa Taverner was named provost in February 2018. After King's resignation in 2021, Taverner succeeded him as president.

== Academics ==
Lyon College is classified among "Baccalaureate Colleges: Arts & Sciences Focus". In 2019, the college was listed at #50 on the "Top Performers of Social Mobility" published by U.S. News & World Report. As of 2020, Lyon College was ranked #164-#215 among "National Liberal Arts Colleges" U.S. News & World Report.

== Campus ==
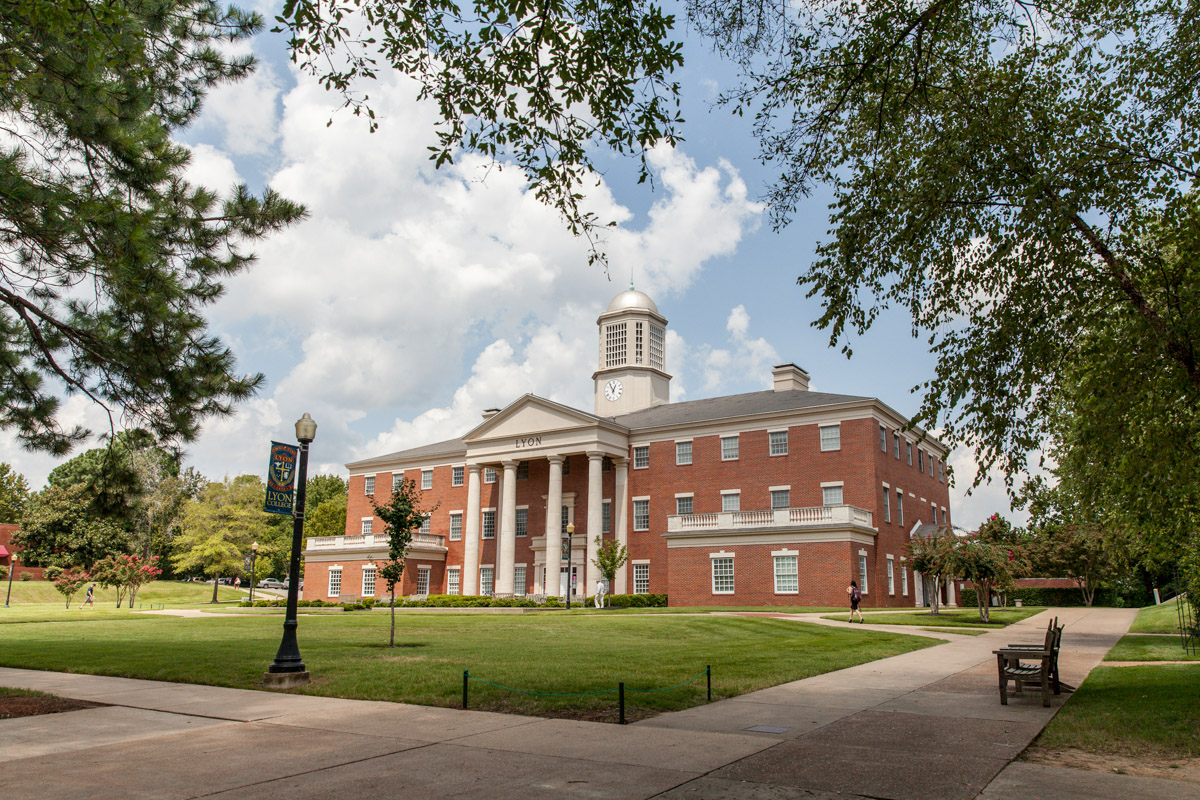
Lyon Building

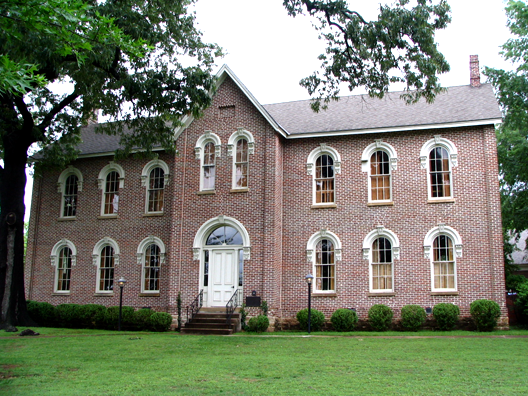
Morrow Hall was built in 1873 as the first permanent building of Arkansas College

The college was originally located in the "downtown" block that the First Presbyterian Church of Batesville now occupies. In the 1920s, the college moved to East End Heights neighborhood, which was later known as the middle campus. The college added more buildings from 1991 and 1994, including the Holloway Theatre, Lyon Business and Economics Building, President's Residence, Bradley Manor, Upper Division Residence Hall, and Young House. The Derby Center for Science and Mathematics was completed in December 2003, followed by the Kelley Baseball Complex, in January 2004. The size of the current campus is 136 acres.

In October 2010, a fire damaged the Edwards Commons Dining Hall. The building was named after John W. Edwards and Lucille Welman Edwards, who originally funded the building. Reconstruction of the building began in October 2011. Lyon college added two new residence halls, named Whiteside and Wilson, in October 2015.

The campus includes an 18-hole disc golf course that is open to the public.

== Student life ==
Student enrollment was 666, as of fall 2024.

Lyon College has a Scottish Heritage program that provides scholarships and hosts the Arkansas Scottish Festival every October. The program also started a campus pipe band that includes Lyon College students, faculty, and staff, along with volunteer musicians from Batesville and surrounding areas. The pipe band has performed locally in Arkansas as well as in Scotland.

The college adopted a pet-friendly policy in January 2018 that allows students to own pets while living in the on-campus dormitories. It began offering obedience classes for animals and animal-friendly facilities, including a coffee shop and a dog park called the Schram Bark Park.

The college has a student-run honor code and a freshman orientation system that runs from before the start of freshman year until the end of the first year.

Lyon College has a fully endowed two-week study abroad program called the Nichols Program.

In 2019, Lyon College initiated an Army Reserve Officers' Training Corps (ROTC) program and Military Science and Leadership concentration. The program is an affiliate of the Arkansas State University ROTC program.

=== Former radio station ===
From 1976 through 1981, the then-Arkansas College operated a low power "Class D" educational FM radio station, KGED, transmitting on 88.1 MHz. Its studio was in the lower level of the Mabee-Simpson library building and the transmitter was located on the upper level of Brown Chapel, with the broadcast antenna inside the steeple. Broadcasting was sporadic over the years and an attempt was made to revive operations in the fall semester of 1981 by freshman station manager Kevin Manzer. However, operations ceased permanently later that same year when the transmitter failed and was deemed not repairable by the station engineer, Dick Treat.

Lyon College students currently operate KILT, an online radio station, and publish student newspaper The Highlander.

== Athletics ==
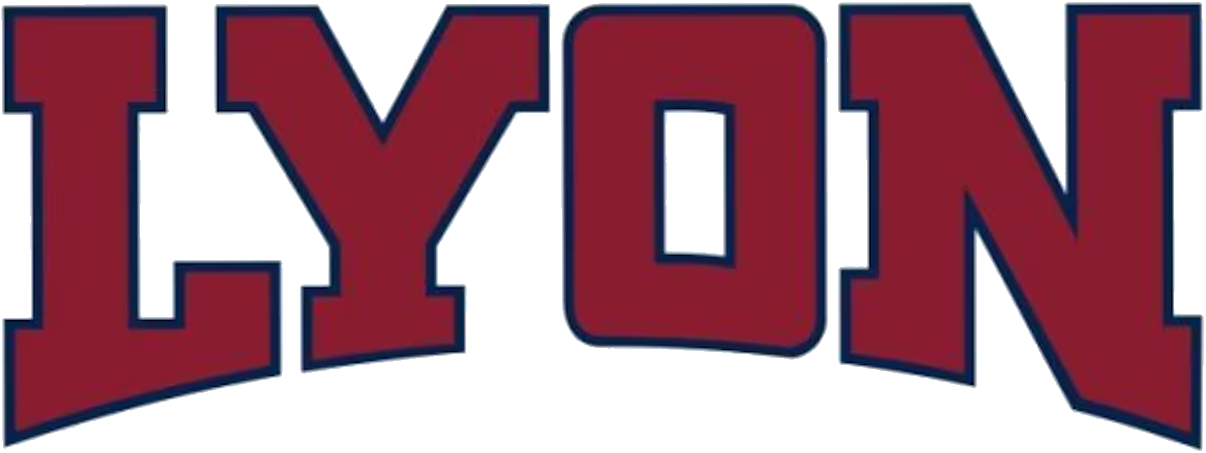
Lyon athletics wordmark

The Lyon athletic teams are called the Scots. The college is a member of the Division III ranks of the National Collegiate Athletic Association (NCAA), primarily competing in the St. Louis Intercollegiate Athletic Conference (SLIAC) since the 2023–24 academic year; while its football team competes in the Southern Collegiate Athletic Conference (SCAC), beginning the 2024 fall season. The Scots previously competed as an NCAA D-III Independent and in the American Midwest Conference (AMC) of the National Association of Intercollegiate Athletics (NAIA) in dual membership during the 2022–23 school year, although they competed in the latter full-time from 2012–13 to 2021–22; in the TranSouth Athletic Conference (TranSouth or TSAC) from 1997–98 to 2011–12; as an NAIA Independent from 1995–96 to 1996–97; and in the defunct Arkansas Intercollegiate Conference (AIC) from about 1980–81 to 1994–95.

Lyon competes in 21 intercollegiate varsity sports: Men's sports include baseball, basketball, cross country, football, golf, soccer, track & field and wrestling; while women's sports include basketball, cross country, golf, soccer, softball, track & field, volleyball and wrestling; and co-ed sports include archery, competitive cheer, competitive dance, eSports and shooting sports. Former sports included men's lacrosse.

=== Wrestling ===
In January 2014, the college added men's and women's wrestling to its athletic offerings.

=== Football ===
Football was added in 2015, which prompted the construction of new residence halls and a 5,500 sq foot field house. The Lyon College football team competed in the Sooner Athletic Conference of the NAIA from the 2018 to 2022 fall seasons.

As of 2024, the Lyon Scots football team competes in the Southern Collegiate Athletic Conference (SCAC).

=== Esports ===
The college is the only member of National Association of Collegiate Esports in the state of Arkansas. Kevin Jenkins is the athletic director.

=== Intramurals ===
The college also fields an intramural sports program.

=== Move to NCAA Division III ===
On February 8, 2022, the school announced that it planned to transition its athletic programs from the NAIA to NCAA Division III, with any conference home yet to be determined.

On August 22, 2022, Lyon received an invitation to join the St. Louis Intercollegiate Athletic Conference (SLIAC), starting in the 2023–24 school year.

== Notable people ==
- Ian Cathcart, New Zealand basketball player
- Garrard Conley, author and LGBTQ activist
- Judd Deere, White House press assistant for U.S. president Donald Trump
- Emily Fleming, Comedian and actor
- Louis Thomas "Moondog" Harding, American Composer
- John Horner Jacobs, American author
- Allie Beth Martin, American librarian
- Debbie Willhite, American political consultant and activist
