= Robert Morrow =

Robert, Rob, Bob or Bobby Morrow may refer to:

- Robert Morrow (VC) (1891–1915), Irish soldier who received the Victoria Cross
- Robert Morrow (rugby union), Irish international rugby union player
- Robert Morrow (Texas politician) (born 1964), American politician
- Robert D. Morrow Sr. (1894–1985), American politician, treasurer of Mississippi
- Rob Morrow (born 1968), American actor and director
- Bob Morrow (1946–2018), Canadian politician
- Bob Morrow (American football) (1918–2003), American football player and coach
- Bobby Morrow (1935–2020), American sprinter
