= James Morrow House =

Historic house in Delaware, United States

- U.S. National Register of Historic Places
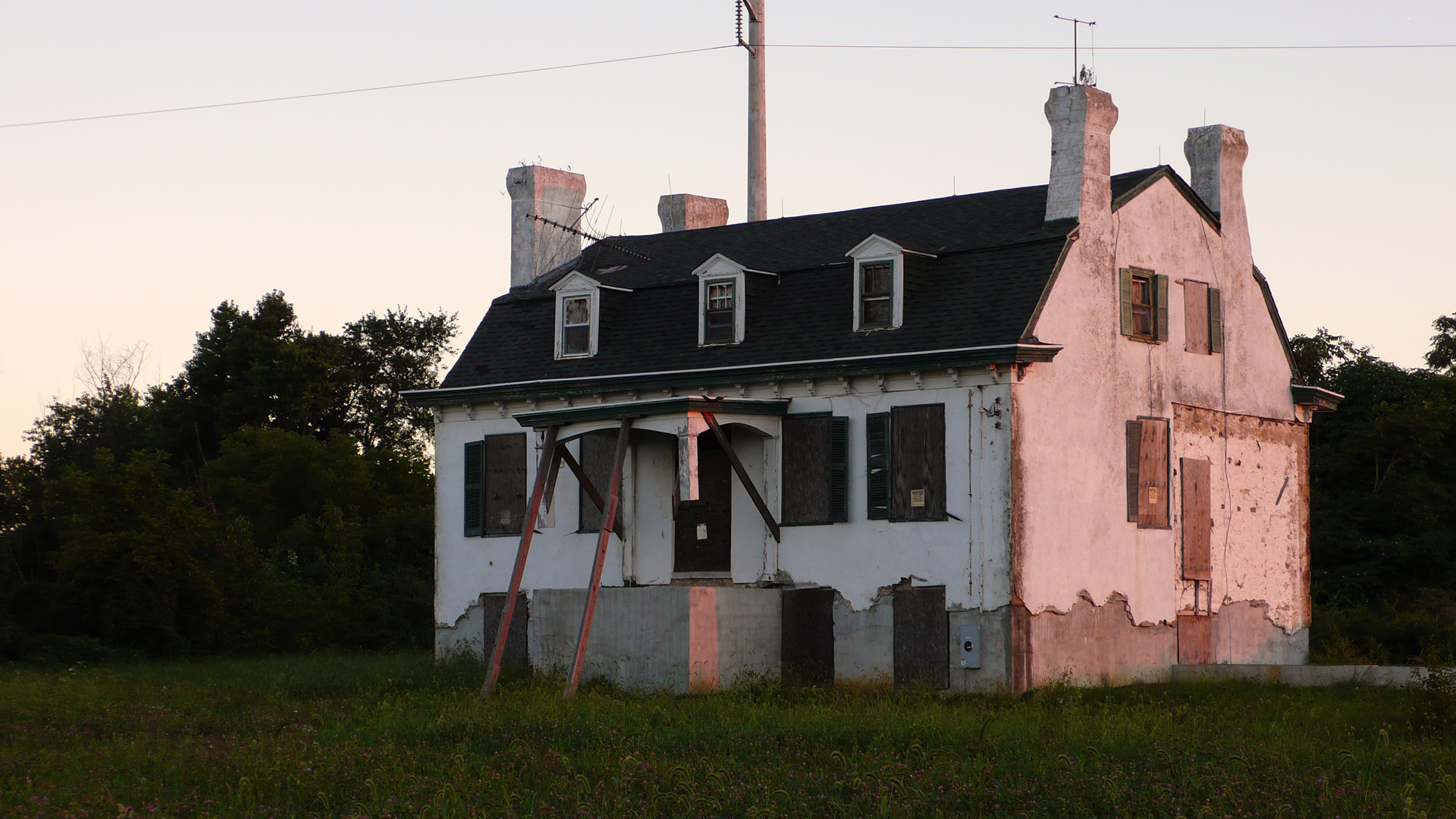
- The James Morrow House in 2012

- Location within Delaware Location within the United States
- Location: 1130 (Formerly 1210) Ogletown Road, Newark, Delaware
- Coordinates: 39°41′11.3″N 75°43′34″W
- Area: 24.5 acres (9.9 ha)
- Built: 1865
- MPS: White Clay Creek Hundred MRA
- NRHP reference No.: 83001399
- Added to NRHP: August 19, 1983

The James Morrow House is a historic farmhouse in Newark, Delaware. It was built in the late 1860s by James Morrow, an Irish immigrant who owned a store in Wilmington. The building is locally significant for its unusual architecture, which features both a gambrel roof and a raised basement. It was listed on the National Register of Historic Places in 1983.

The house has one and a half stories on top of a partially above-ground basement. The facade is symmetrical, with two bays on either side of a flat-roofed porch. The exterior walls are stuccoed with green trim and large sash windows. The house has an asphalt-shingled gambrel roof with bracketed cornices and three gable dormer windows on each side. The house is built from stone and weighs just under 500 tons.

The Morrow House originally stood along with a number of outbuildings on a 24-acre parcel of farmland. In 2008, after being empty for a number of years, the house was cut off at the foundation and moved some 300 feet (91 m) to the west in order to clear the site for new development. The owners of the building as of 2023 have since renovated the structure and opened it as coworking space.
