= Carla Morrow =

American painter

- Born: 1981 (age 44–45)
- Known for: Fantasy Art
- Website: www.dragonladyart.com

Carla Morrow is an American artist specializing in watercolor fantasy dragons. She is also known as The Dragon Lady.

== Career ==
Morrow grew up in Las Cruces, New Mexico from a family of artists including two grandmothers, aunts, uncles, and mother-in-law. As a freelance traditional artist she began with prismacolor and alcohol based markers, but then taught herself colored pencil and finally watercolor. In addition, she has produced some wildlife pencil drawings. Her line of "Little Wings Dragons" began in 2008.
