= Commonwealth v. Hunt =

1842 Massachusetts Supreme Judicial Court case

- Court: Massachusetts Supreme Judicial Court
- Full case name: Commonwealth v. John Hunt & Others
- Decided: March Term 1842
- Citation: 45 Mass. 111, 4 Metcalf 111 (Mass. 1842)

Case history
- Prior action: Decision in favor of plaintiffs.
- Subsequent action: none

Holding
- A labor combination to raise wages is not inherently illegal.

Court membership
- Chief judge: Lemuel Shaw

Case opinions
- Majority: Lemuel Shaw

Commonwealth v. Hunt, 45 Mass. 111 (1842), was a case in the Massachusetts Supreme Judicial Court on the subject of labor unions. Prior to Hunt the legality of labor combinations in America was uncertain. In March 1842, Chief Justice Lemuel Shaw ruled that labor combinations were legal provided that they were organized for a legal purpose and used legal means to achieve their goals.

== Labor combination laws before Hunt ==
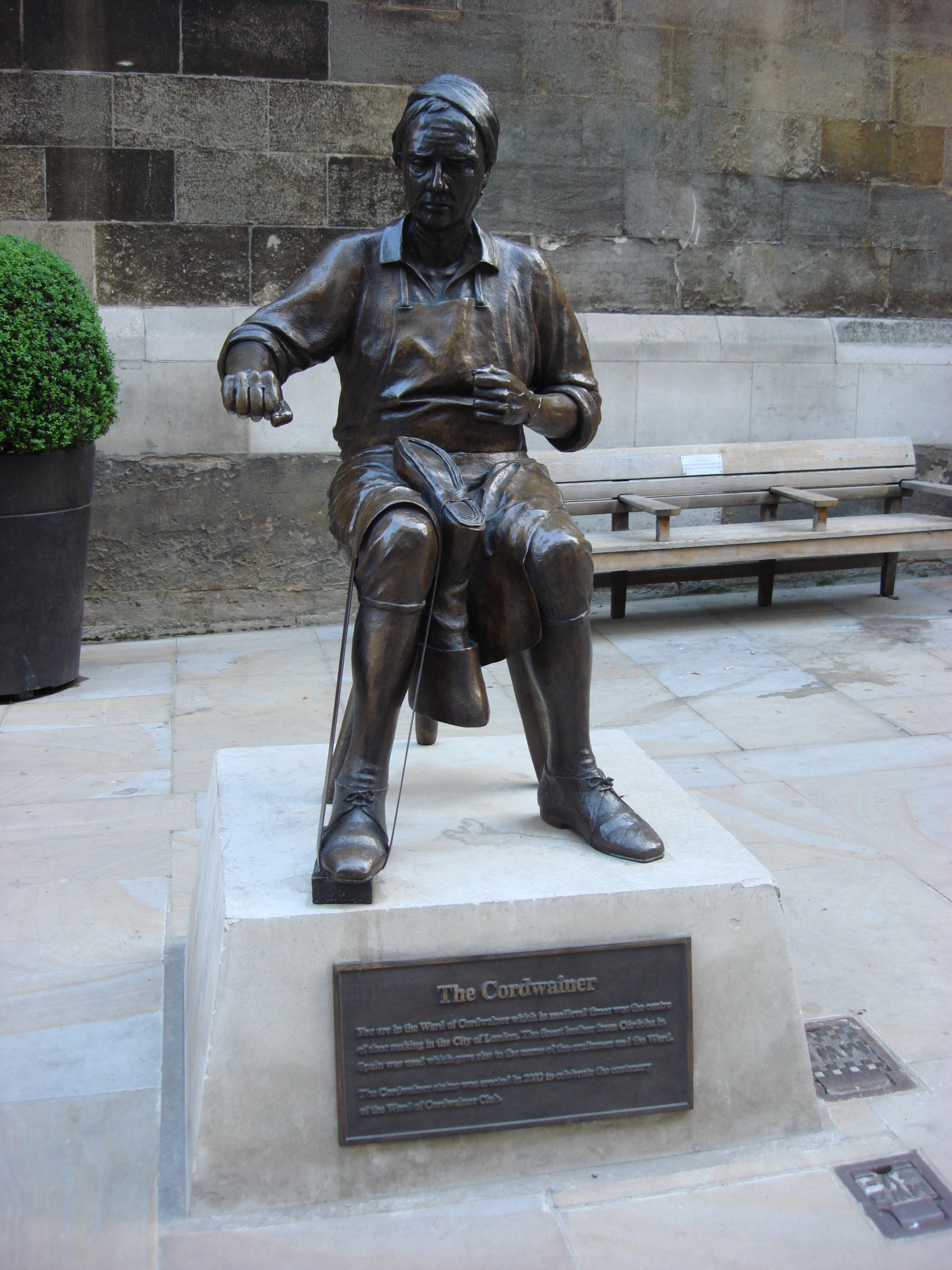
Cordwainer statue on Watling street, in the Cordwainer ward of the City of London.

The history of labor disputes in America substantially predates the Revolutionary period. In 1636, for instance, there was a fishermen's strike on an island off the coast of Maine, and in 1677 twelve carmen were fined for going on strike in New York City. However, most instances of labor unrest during the colonial period were temporary and isolated, and rarely resulted in the formation of permanent groups of laborers for negotiation purposes. Little legal recourse was available to those injured by the unrest because strikes were not typically considered illegal. The only known case of a criminal prosecution of workers in the colonial era occurred as a result of a carpenters' strike in Savannah, Georgia, in 1746.

By the beginning of the 19th century, after the revolution, little had changed. The career path for most artisans still involved apprenticeship under a master, followed by a move into independent production. However, over the course of the Industrial Revolution, this model rapidly changed, particularly in the major metropolitan areas. For instance, in Boston in 1790, the vast majority of the 1,300 artisans in the city described themselves as "master workman". By 1815, journeymen workers without independent means of production had displaced these "masters" as the majority. By that time journeymen also outnumbered masters in New York City and Philadelphia. This shift occurred as a result of large-scale transatlantic and rural-urban migration. Migration into the coastal cities created a larger population of potential laborers, which in turn allowed controllers of capital to invest in labor-intensive enterprises on a larger scale. Craft workers found that these changes launched them into competition with each other to a degree that they had not experienced previously, which limited their opportunities and created substantial risks of downward mobility that had not existed prior to that time.

These conditions led to the first labor combination cases in America. Over the first half of the 19th century, there were twenty-three known cases of indictment and prosecution for criminal conspiracy, taking place in six states: Pennsylvania, Maryland, New York, Louisiana, Massachusetts and Virginia. The central question in these cases was invariably whether workmen in combination would be permitted to use their collective bargaining power to obtain benefits—increased wages, decreased hours, or improved conditions—which were beyond their ability to obtain as individuals. The cases overwhelmingly resulted in convictions. However, in most instances the plaintiffs' desire was to establish favorable precedent, not to impose harsh penalties, and the fines were typically modest.

One of the central themes of the cases prior to the landmark decision in Commonwealth vs. Hunt was the applicability of the English common law in post-revolutionary America. Whether the English common law applied—and in particular whether the common law notion that a conspiracy to raise wages was illegal applied—was frequently the subject of debate between the defense and the prosecution. For instance, in Commonwealth v. Pullis, a case in 1806 against a combination of journeymen cordwainers in Philadelphia for conspiring to raise their wages, the defense attorneys referred to the common law as arbitrary and unknowable and instead praised the legislature as the embodiment of the democratic promise of the revolution. In ruling that a combination to raise wages was per se illegal, Recorder Moses Levy strongly disagreed, writing that "[t]he acts of the legislature form but a small part of that code from which the citizen is to learn his duties... [i]t is in the volumes of the common law we are to seek for information in the far greater number, as well as the most important causes that come before our tribunals."

As a result of the spate of convictions against combinations of laborers, the typical narrative of early American labor law states that, prior to Hunt in Massachusetts in 1842, peaceable combinations of workingmen to raise wages, shorten hours or ensure employment were illegal in the United States, as they had been under English common law. In England, criminal conspiracy laws were first held to include combinations in restraint of trade in the Court of the Star Chamber early in the 17th century. The precedent was solidified in 1721 by The King v. Journeymen Tailors of Cambridge, which found tailors guilty of a conspiracy to raise wages. Leonard Levy went so far as to refer to Hunt as the "Magna Carta of American trade-unionism," illustrating its perceived standing as the major point of divergence in the American and English legal treatment of unions which, "removed the stigma of criminality from labor organizations."

However, Levy's statement incorrectly characterizes the case law in American prior to Hunt. Pullis was actually unusual in strictly following the English common law and holding that a combination to raise wages was by itself illegal. More often combination cases prior to Hunt did not hold that unions were illegal per se, but rather found some other justification for a conviction. After Pullis in 1806, eighteen other prosecutions of laborers for conspiracies followed within the next three decades. However, only one such case, People v. Fisher, also held that a combination for the purpose of raising wages was illegal. Several other cases held that the methods used by the unions, rather than the unions themselves, were illegal. For instance, in People v. Melvin, cordwainers were again convicted of a conspiracy to raise wages. Unlike in Pullis, however, the court held that the combination's existence itself was not unlawful, but nevertheless reached a conviction because the cordwainers had refused to work for any master who paid lower wages, or with any laborer who accepted lower wages, than what the combination had stipulated. The court held that methods used to obtain higher wages would be unlawful if they were judged to be deleterious to the general welfare of the community. Commonwealth v. Morrow continued to refine this standard, stating that, "an agreement of two or more to the prejudice of the rights of others or of society" would be illegal. Another line of cases, led by Justice John Gibson of the Supreme Court of Pennsylvania's decision in Commonwealth v. Carlisle, held that the motive of the combination, rather than simply its existence, was the key to illegality. Gibson wrote, "Where the act is lawful for an individual, it can be the subject of a conspiracy, when done in concert, only where there is a direct intention that injury shall result from it." Still other courts rejected Pullis' rule of per se illegality in favor of a rule that asked whether the combination was a but-for cause of injury. Thus, as economist Edwin Witte stated, "[T]he doctrine that a combination to raise wages is illegal was allowed to die by common consent. No leading case was required for its overthrow." Nevertheless, while Hunt was not the first case to hold that labor combinations were legal, it was the first to do so explicitly and in clear terms.

== Background ==
Members of the Boston Journeymen Bootmaker's Society, founded in 1835 and local to Boston, worked exclusively on high-quality boots. In 1835, in response to rampant inflation caused by Andrew Jackson's destruction of the Bank of the United States, the society raised their pay, by means of striking, to $1.75 per pair of boots produced. In 1836, they staged another strike, this time successfully raising their pay to $2.00 per pair. Their rates remained the same in 1840, when the incidents giving rise to Hunt occurred. However, by that time increases in the quality of the boots being produced prevented the bootmakers from producing pairs as quickly, essentially lowering their hourly rate in the midst of a severe economic downturn triggered by the Panic of 1837.

One journeyman bootmaker, Jeremiah Horne, was in a dispute with the Society. Horne began to have disagreements with the Society when he agreed to do extra work on a pair of boots without charging for the extra labor. The Society imposed a fine on Horne, which he refused to pay. Ultimately the fine was forgiven when Horne's master, Isaac Wait, agreed to pay Horne for the work at the Society-fixed rate. Horne nevertheless continued to breach the Society's rules, and soon had incurred another $7 in fees. The Society demanded that he pay. When Horne refused, the Society threatened a walkout of Wait's shop and Wait fired him.

Horne responded by entering a complaint with the Suffolk County Attorney, Samuel D. Parker, and by sending his cousin, Dennis, who was also a member of the Society, to try to reach a settlement with them. Dennis attended a Society meeting in early October 1840, but was ridiculed and stormed out. A few days later, on October 8, an indictment was entered charging that the Society was a criminal conspiracy to impoverish employers and non-union laborers. Seven members of the Society were named as defendants. Although there was no evidence that the Society planned to strike or that there was any large-scale disagreement between employers and the Society, Parker decided to take the case. The trial began on October 14 and ended on October 22.

== Judgment ==
=== Trial court ===
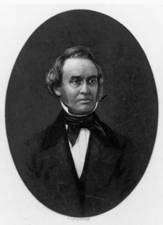
Robert Rantoul, Jr.

At trial, the prosecution, led by Parker, focused on proving that the Society was coercive. Wait, Horne's master, testified, "He did not feel at liberty to employ any but society men", because he, "would not wish to lose five or six good workmen for the sake of one." However, he also testified he had not been oppressed and that he had benefited from the Society's existence. Parker tried to call Horne himself to testify, but the defense successfully prevented his testimony from being heard on the ground that he was an atheist. The prosecution, however, was able to directly ask several masters, over the defense's objection, whether the Society was coercive. Some said yes.

The Society hired Robert Rantoul, Jr. to represent them. Rantoul's defense focused on establishing the benefits of the Society. He called witnesses who testified the wages stipulated by the Society were reasonable and non-members were also able to attain wages at the same rate. Non-workers were only prevented from working at a handful of the larger shops. Rantoul also called representatives from other professional organizations, such as the Boston Medical Association and the Boston Bar, of which the Judge, the District Attorney, the Attorney General, Daniel Webster and the Chief Justice of the Massachusetts Supreme Court, Lemuel Shaw, were all members. Rantoul also solicited testimony that the Bar Association fixed minimum fees for which its members could receive and forbade members from advising or consulting any non-member attorney. He hoped to show the jury that professional organizations such the Bootmaker's Society were not uncommon in Boston.

Rantoul also argued there was no law in Massachusetts against a conspiracy in restraint of trade. (At that time in Massachusetts, juries still served as triers of both law and fact). Rantoul told the jury, "We have not adopted the whole mass of the common law of England. [...] Law against acts done in restraint of trade belong to that portion of the law of England which we have not adopted." Rantoul argued, as the conspiracy itself was not unlawful, the question was whether the defendants had injured anyone through an illegal act. He stated, "We contend they have a perfect right to form a society for their mutual interest and improvement. [...] To substantiate these charges [...] they must prove actual force, fraud and nuisance." Rantoul's emphasis on the requirement of injury recalled Gibson's opinion in Carlisle twenty years earlier, and drew from the entire line of cases opposing Pullis and Fisher.

Rantoul's efforts, however, were greatly undermined by Judge Thacher's emotional charge to the jury. Thacher told the jury that if societies such as the Bootmaker's Society were justified by the law and became common, it would "render property insecure, and make it the spoil of the multitude, would annihilate property, and involve society in a common ruin." Thacher also specifically rebutted Rantoul with regard to the status of the common law, stating that "conspiracy is an offence at common law, as adopted in Massachusetts, and by this decision and that of this court you must abide." Levy wrote that Thacher's charge, "practically directed a verdict of guilty."

After Thacher gave his instructions the jury returned a conviction against all seven defendants. Rantoul appealed the case to the Supreme Judicial Court of Massachusetts.

=== State Supreme Court ===
Chief Justice Lemuel Shaw held the union's actions were not unlawful, because the objects of the union and the action taken of threatening to stop work to prevent Horne's continued employment, were not unlawful in the law of Massachusetts. This contrasted with the laws in England in 1721, in R v Journeymen Tailors of Cambridge. The union could exercise "a power which might be exerted for useful and honorable purposes, or for dangerous and pernicious ones." But only if an independently unlawful act could be found, which was clearly laid down in the law, could a combination of people to do the same thing also be unlawful. He pointed out that competition among businesses were often treated the same, and so the economic loss to the employer or Horne could not count as actionable damage. The workers were "free to work for whom the please, or not to work, if they so prefer.... We cannot perceive that it is criminal for men to agree together to exercise their own acknowledged rights, in such a manner as best to subserve their own interests." Shaw CJ's judgment went as follows.

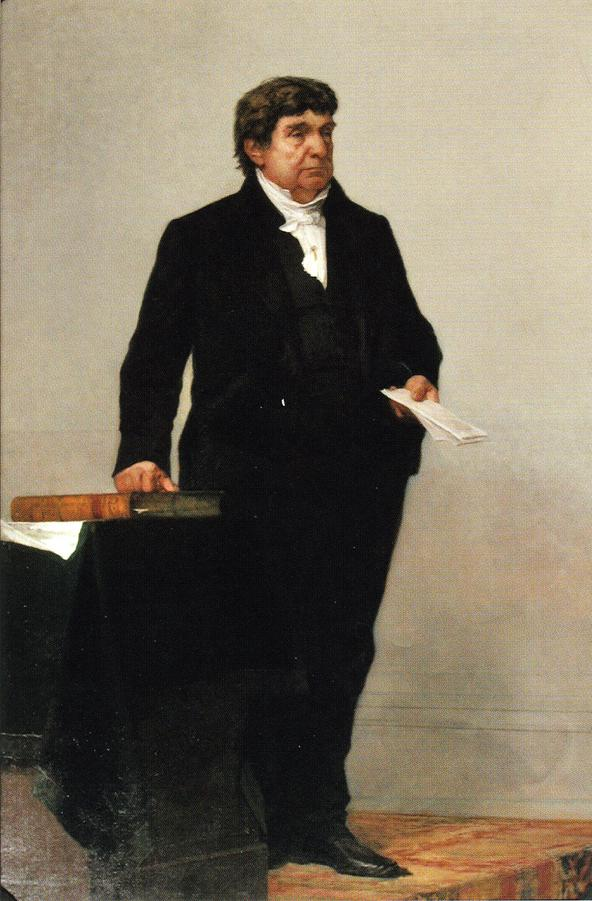
Chief Justice Lemuel Shaw, painted by William Morris Hunt

We have no doubt, that by the operation of the constitution of this Commonwealth, the general rules of the common law, making conspiracy an indictable offence, are in force here, and that this is included in the description of laws which had, before the adoption of the constitution, been used and approved in the Province, Colony, or State of Massachusetts Bay, and usually practised in the courts of law.... Still, it is proper in this connexion to remark, that although the common law in regard to conspiracy in this Commonwealth is in force, yet it will not necessarily follow that every indictment at common law for this offence is a precedent for a similar indictment in this State. The general rule of the common law is, that it is a criminal and indictable offence, for two or more to confederate and combine together, by concerted means, to do that which is unlawful or criminal, to the injury of the public, or portions or classes of the community, or even to the rights of an individual. This rule of law may be equally in force as a rule of the common law, in England and in this Commonwealth; and yet it must depend upon the local laws of each country to determine, whether the purpose to be accomplished by the combination, or the concerted means of accomplishing it, be unlawful or criminal in the respective countries. All those laws of the parent country, whether rules of the common law, or early English statutes, which were made for the purpose of regulating the wages of laborers, the settlement of paupers, and making it penal for any one to use a trade or handicraft to which he had not served a full apprenticeship—not being adapted to the circumstances of our colonial condition—were not adopted, used or approved, and therefore do not come within the description of the laws adopted and confirmed by the provision of the constitution already cited. This consideration will do something towards reconciling the English and American cases, and may indicate how far the principles of the English cases will apply in this Commonwealth, and show why a conviction in England, in many cases, would not be a precedent for a like conviction here. The King v. Journeymen Tailors of Cambridge, 8 Mod. 10, for instance, is commonly cited as an authority for an indictment at common law, and a conviction of journeymen mechanics of a conspiracy to raise their wages. It was there held, that the indictment need not conclude contra formam statuti, because the gist of the offence was the conspiracy, which was an offence at common law. At the same time it was conceded, that the unlawful object to be accomplished was the raising of wages above the rate fixed by a general act of parliament. It was therefore a conspiracy to violate a general statute law, made for the regulation of a large branch of trade, affecting the comfort and interest of the public; and thus the object to be accomplished by the conspiracy was unlawful, if not criminal.

[Shaw CJ set out the background on the conspiracy laws, and continued....]

We are here carefully to distinguish between the confederacy set forth in the indictment, and the confederacy or association contained in the constitution of the Boston Journeymen Bootmakers' Society, as stated in the little printed book, which was admitted as evidence on the trial. Because, though it was thus admitted as evidence, it would not warrant a conviction for anything not stated in the indictment. It was proof, as far as it went to support the averments in the indictment. If it contained any criminal matter not set forth in the indictment, it is of no avail. The question then presents itself in the same form as on a motion in arrest of judgment.

The first count set forth, that the defendants, with divers others unknown, on the day and at the place named, being workmen, and journeymen, in the art and occupation of bootmakers, unlawfully, perniciously and deceitfully designing and intending to continue, keep up, form, and unite themselves, into an unlawful club, society and combination, and make unlawful by-laws, rules and orders among themselves, and thereby govern themselves and other workmen, in the said art, and unlawfully and unjustly to extort great sums of money by means thereof, did unlawfully assemble and meet together, and being so assembled, did unjustly and corruptly conspire, combine, confederate and agree together, that none of them should thereafter, and that none of them would, work for any master or person whatsoever, in the said art, mystery and occupation, who should employ any workman or journeyman, or other person, in the said art, who was not a member of said club, society or combination, after notice given him to discharge such workman, from the employ of such master; to the great damage and oppression, &c.

Now it is to be considered, that the preamble and introductory matter in the indictment--such as unlawfully and deceitfully designing and intending unjustly to extort great sums, &c.--is mere recital, and not traversable, and therefore cannot aid an imperfect averment of the facts constituting the description of the offence. The same may be said of the concluding matter, which follows the averment, as to the great damage and oppression not only of their said masters, employing them in said art and occupation, but also of divers other workmen in the same art, mystery and occupation, to the evil example, &c. If the facts averred constitute the crime, these are properly stated as the legal inferences to be drawn from them. If they do not constitute the charge of such an offence, they cannot be aided by these alleged consequences.

Stripped then of these introductory recitals and alleged injurious consequences, and of the qualifying epithets attached to the facts, the averment is this; that the defendants and others formed themselves into a society, and agreed not to work for any person, who should employ any journeyman or other person, not a member of such society, after notice given him to discharge such workman.

The manifest intent of the association is, to induce all those engaged in the same occupation to become members of it. Such a purpose is not unlawful. It would give them a power which might be exerted for useful and honorable purposes, or for dangerous and pernicious ones. If the latter were the real and actual object, and susceptible of proof, it should have been specially charged. Such an association might be used to afford each other assistance in times of poverty, sickness and distress; or to raise their intellectual, moral and social condition; or to make improvement in their art; or for other proper purposes. Or the association might be designed for purposes of oppression and injustice. But in order to charge all those, who become members of an association, with the guilt of a criminal conspiracy, it must be averred and proved that the actual, if not the avowed object of the association, was criminal. An association may be formed, the declared objects of which are innocent and laudable, and yet they may have secret articles, or an agreement communicated only to the members, by which they are banded together for purposes injurious to the peace of society or the rights of its members. Such would undoubtedly be a criminal conspiracy, on proof of the fact, however meritorious and praiseworthy the declared objects might be. The law is not to be hoodwinked by colorable pretences. It looks at truth and reality, through whatever disguise it may assume. But to make such an association, ostensibly innocent, the subject of prosecution as a criminal conspiracy, the secret agreement, which makes it so, is to be averred and proved as the gist of the offence. But when an association is formed for purposes actually innocent, and afterwards its powers are abused, by those who have the control and management of it, to purposes of oppression and injustice, it will be criminal in those who thus misuse it, or give consent thereto, but not in the other members of the association. In this case, no such secret agreement, varying the objects of the association from those avowed, is set forth in this count of the indictment.

Nor can we perceive that the objects of this association, whatever they may have been, were to be attained by criminal means. The means which they proposed to employ, as averred in this count, and which, as we are now to presume, were established by the proof, were, that they would not work for a person, who, after due notice, should employ a journeyman not a member of their society. Supposing the object of the association to be laudable and lawful, or at least not unlawful, are these means criminal? The case supposes that these persons are not bound by contract, but free to work for whom they please, or not to work, if they so prefer. In this state of things, we cannot perceive, that it is criminal for men to agree together to exercise their own acknowledged rights, in such a manner as best to subserve their own interests. One way to test this is, to consider the effect of such an agreement, where the object of the association is acknowledged on all hands to be a laudable one. Suppose a class of workmen, impressed with the manifold evils of intemperance, should agree with each other not to work in a shop in which ardent spirit was furnished, or not to work in a shop with any one who used it, or not to work for an employer, who should, after notice, employ a journeyman who habitually used it. The consequences might be the same. A workman, who should still persist in the use of ardent spirit, would find it more difficult to get employment; a master employing such a one might, at times, experience inconvenience in his work, in losing the services of a skilful but intemperate workman. Still it seems to us, that as the object would be lawful, and the means not unlawful, such an agreement could not be pronounced a criminal conspiracy.

From this count in the indictment, we do not understand that the agreement was, that the defendants would refuse to work for an employer, to whom they were bound by contract for a certain time, in violation of that contract; nor that they would insist that an employer should discharge a workman engaged by contract for a certain time, in violation of such contract. It is perfectly consistent with every thing stated in this count, that the effect of the agreement was, that when they were free to act, they would not engage with an employer, or continue in his employment, if such employer, when free to act, should engage with a workman, or continue a workman in his employment, not a member of the association. If a large number of men, engaged for a certain time, should combine together to violate their contract, and quit their employment together, it would present a very different question. Suppose a farmer, employing a large number of men, engaged for the year, at fair monthly wages, and suppose that just at the moment that his crops were ready to harvest, they should all combine to quit his service, unless he would advance their wages, at a time when other laborers could not be obtained. It would surely be a conspiracy to do an unlawful act, though of such a character, that if done by an individual, it would lay the foundation of a civil action only, and not of a criminal prosecution. It would be a case very different from that stated in this count.

The second count, omitting the recital of unlawful intent and evil disposition, and omitting the direct averment of an unlawful club or society, alleges that the defendants, with others unknown, did assemble, conspire, confederate and agree together, not to work for any master or person who should employ any workman not being a member of a certain club, society or combination, called the Boston Journeymen Bootmaker's Society, or who should break any of their by-laws, unless such workmen should pay to said club, such sum as should be agreed upon as a penalty for the breach of such unlawful rules, &c; and that by means of said conspiracy they did compel one Isaac B. Wait, a master cordwainer, to turn out of his employ one Jeremiah Horne, a journeyman boot-maker, &c. in evil example, &c. So far as the averment of a conspiracy is concerned, all the remarks made in reference to the first count are equally applicable to this. It is simply an averment of an agreement amongst themselves not to work for a person, who should employ any person not a member of a certain association. It sets forth no illegal or criminal purpose to be accomplished, nor any illegal or criminal means to be adopted for the accomplishment of any purpose. It was an agreement, as to the manner in which they would exercise an acknowledged right to contract with others for their labor. It does not aver a conspiracy or even an intention to raise their wages; and it appears by the bill of exceptions, that the case was not put upon the footing of a conspiracy to raise their wages. Such an agreement, as set forth in this count, would be perfectly justifiable under the recent English statute, by which this subject is regulated. St. 6 Geo. IV. c. 129. See Roscoe Crim. Ev. (2d Amer. ed.) 368, 369.

As to the latter part of this count, which avers that by means of said conspiracy, the defendants did compel one Wait to turn out of his employ one Jeremiah Horne, we remark, in the first place, that as the acts done in pursuance of a conspiracy, as we have before seen, are stated by way of aggravation, and not as a substantive charge; if no criminal or unlawful conspiracy is stated, it cannot be aided and made good by mere matter of aggravation. If the principal charge falls, the aggravation falls with it. State v. Rickey, 4 Halst. 293.

But further; if this is to be considered as a substantive charge, it would depend altogether upon the force of the word "compel," which may be used in the sense of coercion, or duress, by force or fraud. It would therefore depend upon the context and the connexion with other words, to determine the sense in which it was used in the indictment. If, for instance, the indictment had averred a conspiracy, by the defendants, to compel Wait to turn Horne out of his employment, and to accomplish that object by the use of force or fraud, it would have been a very different case; especially if it might be fairly construed, as perhaps in that case it might have been, that Wait was under obligation, by contract, for an unexpired term of time, to employ and pay Horne. As before remarked, it would have been a conspiracy to do an unlawful, though not a criminal act, to induce Wait to violate his engagement, to the actual injury of Horne. To mark the difference between the case of a journeyman or a servant and master, mutually bound by contract, and the same parties when free to engage anew, I should have before cited the case of the Boston Glass Co. v. Binney, 4 Pick. 425. In that case, it was held actionable to entice another person's hired servant to quit his employment, during the time for which he was engaged; but not actionable to treat with such hired servant, whilst actually hired and employed by another, to leave his service, and engage in the employment of the person making the proposal, when the term for which he is engaged shall expire. It acknowledges the established principle, that every free man, whether skilled laborer, mechanic, farmer or domestic servant, may work or not work, or work or refuse to work with any company or individual, at his own option, except so far as he is bound by contract. But whatever might be the force of the word "compel," unexplained by its connexion, it is disarmed and rendered harmless by the precise statement of the means, by which such compulsion was to be effected. It was the agreement not to work for him, by which they compelled Wait to decline employing Horne longer. On both of these grounds, we are of opinion that the statement made in this second count, that the unlawful agreement was carried into execution, makes no essential difference between this and the first count.

The third count, reciting a wicked and unlawful intent to impoverish one Jeremiah Horne, and hinder him from following his trade as a boot-maker, charges the defendants, with others unknown, with an unlawful conspiracy, by wrongful and indirect means, to impoverish said Horne and to deprive and hinder him, from his said art and trade and getting his support thereby, and that, in pursuance of said unlawful combination, they did unlawfully and indirectly hinder and prevent, &c. and greatly impoverish him.

If the fact of depriving Jeremiah Horne of the profits of his business, by whatever means it might be done, would be unlawful and criminal, a combination to compass that object would be an unlawful conspiracy, and it would be unnecessary to state the means. Such seems to have been the view of the court in The King v. Eccles, 3 Doug. 337, though the case is so briefly reported, that the reasons, on which it rests, are not very obvious. The case seems to have gone on the ground, that the means were matter of evidence, and not of averment; and that after verdict, it was to be presumed, that the means contemplated and used were such as to render the combination unlawful and constitute a conspiracy.

Suppose a baker in a small village had the exclusive custom of his neighborhood, and was making large profits by the sale of his bread. Supposing a number of those neighbors, believing the price of his bread too high, should propose to him to reduce his prices, or if he did not, that they would introduce another baker; and on his refusal, such other baker should, under their encouragement, set up a rival establishment, and sell his bread at lower prices; the effect would be to diminish the profit of the former baker, and to the same extent to impoverish him. And it might be said and proved, that the purpose of the associates was to diminish his profits, and thus impoverish him, though the ultimate and laudable object of the combination was to reduce the cost of bread to themselves and their neighbors. The same thing may be said of all competition in every branch of trade and industry; and yet it is through that competition, that the best interests of trade and industry are promoted. It is scarcely necessary to allude to the familiar instances of opposition lines of conveyance, rival hotels, and the thousand other instances, where each strives to gain custom to himself, by ingenious improvements, by increased industry, and by all the means by which he may lessen the price of commodities, and thereby diminish the profits of others.

We think, therefore, that associations may be entered into, the object of which is to adopt measures that may have a tendency to impoverish another, that is, to diminish his gains and profits, and yet so far from being criminal or unlawful, the object may be highly meritorious and public spirited. The legality of such an association will therefore depend upon the means to be used for its accomplishment. If it is to be carried into effect by fair or honorable and lawful means, it is, to say the least, innocent; if by falsehood or force, it may be stamped with the character of conspiracy. It follows as a necessary consequence, that if criminal and indictable, it is so by reason of the criminal means intended to be employed for its accomplishment; and as a further legal consequence, that as the criminality will depend on the means, those means must be stated in the indictment. If the same rule were to prevail in criminal, which holds in civil proceedings—that a case defectively stated may be aided by a verdict—then a court might presume, after verdict, that the indictment was supported by proof of criminal or unlawful means to effect the object. But it is an established rule in criminal cases, that the indictment must state a complete indictable offence, and cannot be aided by the proof offered at the trial.

== Significance ==
Shaw's landmark opinion in favor of labor was incongruous with his politics and other jurisprudence. Shaw wrote his opinion in Hunt just one week after he decided another landmark labor case, Farwell v. Boston & Worcester R.R. Corp. In that case, Shaw upheld the fellow-servant rule by deciding that a railroad company could not be held liable when a mistake by an employee operating a rail switch caused an injury to another employee. As the outcome in Farwell would suggest, Shaw was not ordinarily considered a friend of labor. Walter Nelles wrote that, "The constituency to which [Shaw] was keenest comprised State Street and Beacon Hill, the bankers, the textile manufacturers, the railway builders." Nelles theorized that Shaw was more concerned with tariff protection than with labor concerns, and that his decision in Hunt was a product of strategic consideration. Nelles notes that in 1842, in the middle of a depression, labor unrest in the textile mills that drove much of Boston's economy was very unlikely. However, Whigs like Shaw may have been concerned that agitating the working class would help bring the Democratic party to power in the election of 1844. Whigs worried that the Democrats would abolish the tariffs protecting the weakened textile industry. Shaw's decision in Hunt, therefore, may have been motivated by a desire to placate Boston's working class.

Whatever Shaw's motivation, his opinion in Hunt provided a clear statement that labor combinations which used legal means to achieve legal ends were lawful.

The degree of Hunt's impact is a matter of some debate. Levy notes that in the forty years after Hunt was decided, the case served as the authoritative statement of the law on labor combinations. However, as favorable as Hunt was for labor unions, its holding still left the door open for courts to convict strikers by declaring certain labor activity criminal, or by holding the purpose of a strike to be an unlawful interference with private enterprise. Also, Witte notes that there were limited opportunities to apply Hunt until the end of the Civil War. Witte was able to find only three conspiracy cases brought anywhere in the United States between 1842 and 1863.

However, between 1863 and 1880 the pace of conspiracy indictments picked up again. At least fifteen cases were brought during that time. Despite Hunt's softening of the conspiracy doctrine, convictions were still obtained and harsh sentences imposed. For instance, in 1869, members of a mine committee in Pottsville, Pennsylvania, were found guilty of conspiracy, sentenced to jail for thirty days and heavily fined. Prosecutions in this period led to labor efforts to gain relief through legislation. In 1869, Pennsylvania passed a statute declaring labor unions legal if formed for "mutual aid, benefit, and protection" and when convictions continued to be obtained, passed another law in 1872 providing that laborers could collectively refuse to work for any employer. The need for such legislation suggests that Hunt, while beneficial for labor, was hardly a guarantee that workers would be able to organize without fear of legal repercussion.

== See also ==
- US labor law
- UK labour law
- Mogul Steamship Co Ltd v McGregor, Gow & Co [1892] AC 25
- Farwell v. Boston & W.R. Corp., 45 Mass. 49 (1842)
