= David Morrow =

David, Dave, or Davy Morrow may refer to:

- David Morrow (politician) (1834–1905), New Brunswick MLA
- David Morrow (sports), lacrosse player and entrepreneur
- David Morrow (commentator) (1953–2024), Australian sports commentator
- David C. Morrow (American football) (1882–1953), American football coach
- David J. Morrow (1960–2010), editor and journalist
- David R. Morrow, American philosopher and policy analyst
- Dave Morrow (born 1957), Canadian ice hockey player
- Davy Morrow (born 1956), Northern Irish rugby union player
