= Labor Reform Act of 1977 =

US federal bill concerning collective bargaining oversight

The Labor Reform Act of 1977 was a proposed legislative act that would have amended the National Labor Relations Act (NLRA). The bill was introduced as H.R. 8410 in the U.S. House of Representatives and after passing through the House, it entered the U.S. Senate as S. 2467. In the Senate, the Act underwent amendments before failing to pass by a mere two votes.

The bill was presented as a means of streamlining the processes of and eliminating delays within the National Labor Relations Board (NLRB). Opponents to the bill argued the Act would "upset what they believed to be a delicate balance in Federal policy towards labor-management relations, and was simply an effort to help unions increase their membership and bargaining power."

== Background ==
In 1977, President Carter, in a letter to Congress, outlined what he saw were the shortfalls of the NLRB in administering the nation's labor laws. President Carter noted that unnecessary delays "are the most serious problem," followed by weak remedies offered by the NLRB, which ultimately injures the worker's ability to choose whether they want union representation and "den[ies] employers the predictability they too need from the labor laws."

In that same letter, President Carter declared three goals the labor law reforms were designed to meet. His labor law reforms aimed to: "make the NLRB procedures fairer, prompter, and more predictable... protect the rights of labor and management by strengthening NLRB sanctions against those who break the law..." and "preserve the integrity of the Federal contracting process by withholding federal contracts from firms that willfully violate orders from the NLRB and the courts. In order to achieve these goals, President Carter suggested the following changes:

- A shorter period of time between when elections are filed with the NLRB and when the elections are held.
- The establishment of clear rules to define bargaining units in order to streamline NLRB procedures that are applied on a case-by-case basis.
- Expansion of the NLRB from five to seven members.
- Institution of a process by which the NLRB can summarily affirm decisions of administrative law judges.
- A time limit on the option to appeal an NLRB decision.
- A grant of power to the NLRB to order employers to compensate workers for unfair delay if the employer was found to have refused to bargain for a first contract.
- Authorization of double back-pay to workers unlawfully discharged before the initial contract.
- A grant of power to the NLRB to initiate debarment proceedings if an employer is found to have "willfully and repeatedly violated NLRB orders."
- Institution of a requirement for the NLRB to seek preliminary injunctions against specified unfair labor practices like unlawful discharges.

== Content ==
=== H.R. 8410 ===
The House bill, and its identical Senate counterpart (S. 1883), targeted three areas of the NLRA: procedures by the NLRB; representation elections; and NLRB remedies.

In seeking to improve NLRB procedures, the Act would have: increased the NLRB to seven members from five; established a summary affirmance process; added discriminatory discharges to the list of unfair labor practices that are given priority treatment by the NLRB; and placed a thirty-day deadline on NLRB decisions before those decisions could not be appealed. By increasing the NLRB membership, the Act aimed to have more panels of three members operate at a time and increase the caseload and turnover rate of cases. Summary affirmance procedures would allow the board to affirm an administrative law judge's decision without further elaboration in appropriate cases; the definition of appropriate cases would have been determined by the NLRB. Prioritizing discriminatory discharge cases aimed to lessen the pain suffered by a wrongly fired employee. Providing these cases with priority status would mean that the NLRB would conduct preliminary investigations and if the investigation gives the NLRB "reasonable cause to believe such charge is true... the officer must petition in federal district court for injunctive relief." The thirty day deadline to appeal NLRB decisions would potentially limit the ability for the charged party to be prevented from raising claims once the thirty days expire, preventing delays in the filing of litigation and promoting the effectiveness of the NLRB's orders.

Representation election reform took the form of measures to streamline elections for union representation by reducing delays before elections are held, based on a schedule of how many employees are required to hold that election. Furthermore, the Act would also have required the NLRB make rules and requirements as to which groups of employees are appropriate for collective bargaining or eligible for representation elections.

Additional remedies the NLRB could grant included: "double back pay to workers illegally deprived of employment... swift court injunctions reinstating illegally discharged employees... back pay awards for employees when employers refuse to bargain with employee representatives... and the barring from eligibility for Federal contracts (for three years) persons who willfully violated Board or court orders."

== Arguments in Congress ==
=== Arguments in Favor of the Act ===
Generally, the proponents of the Act viewed the labor law reform as a means of making the NLRA more efficient and serve employees and employers better. Proponents also asserted that claims that the Act was one-sided or favored employees and unionization, but rather the Act was "intended to remove the obstacles that... stand in the way of achieving the collective bargaining rights already guaranteed in our labor laws." The efficiency of the NLRB would impact employers just as positively as it would impact employees by resolving disputes that would hamper business.

=== Arguments Against the Act ===
Opponents to the Act asserted that the NLRB framework was functional as it existed and the Act would throw out of balance what was already balanced. These amendments to the NLRA would "requir[e] that employers open their premises to professional union organizers... severely penaliz[e] employers" by amending the NLRA to become punitive as opposed to remedial, and "reduc[e] the power of the courts to review Labor Board determinations."
