= Judge Morrow =

Judge Morrow may refer to:

- Margaret M. Morrow (born 1950), judge of the United States District Court for the Central District of California
- William W. Morrow (1843–1929), judge of the United States Court of Appeals for the Ninth Circuit
