= Debbie Willhite =

- Born: December 28, 1951 (age 74); Memphis, Tennessee
- Died: June 10, 2025
- Education: Lyon College
- Occupations: Political consultant, Political activist
- Website: Official site

Debbie Willhite (born December 28, 1951) is an American Democratic political consultant and activist who has worked on six presidential campaigns, served as Policy Director for the Speaker of the House in Connecticut, and served as the National Coordinated Campaign Director for both the 1992 and 1996 Presidential campaigns of Bill Clinton. In addition, she has worked for every Democratic National Convention from 1980 until 2008.

== Bio ==
Debbie Willhite has been an activist, party organizer, strategist, and consultant for Democratic candidates and progressives since 1978 on the local, state, and national levels. Her call to public service has led her through the local, state, and national ranks. She has also served in political and leadership roles for the Speaker of the House in Connecticut, the United States Postal Service, and the Arkansas Insurance Department.

Willhite's political journey began while attending graduate school in Orlando, Florida. She volunteered in a congressional race where First Lady Rosalynn Carter, and Chip Carter made visits on behalf of her candidate. Soon after that, she was hired to be Deputy Director for the Southern Region of the Democratic National Committee.

Since that time, Willhite has worked in eight presidential races and served as Policy Director for the Speaker of the House in Connecticut from 1986 to 1992. She served as the National Coordinated Campaign Director for both of Bill Clinton's presidential campaigns, Additionally, she has worked for every Democratic National Convention from 1980 until 2016.

From 1997 until 2002, Willhite served as the Sr. Vice President of the USPS for Government Relation and Corporate Communications. In this capacity, she managed more than 5,000 employees and administered a budget of over $300,000,000. She worked with the United States Congress on a daily basis to manage the affairs of the USPS. She directed the redesign of the Communications Department and led its adoption of new technology and strategies for internal and external communications. She was the chief spokesperson for the USPS during the 2001 anthrax attacks. The USPS received four national awards for its crisis management and communications in 2002. In 1999 she was a delegate to the Universal Postal Union meeting in Beijing, China. In 2000 she received the prestigious Board of Governors' Award given annually to an officers' outstanding performance. In 2001 she received the Postmaster General's Award for leadership during the Anthrax Crisis.

She gained international political experience by working in campaigns in South Africa and [Equatorial Guinea] and by serving as an adviser to the political parties in Northern Ireland. Her national experience includes work for state parties in Arkansas, Georgia Florida, Connecticut, and Colorado.

In addition to this experience, Willhite has served in leadership roles for some of our nation's largest political events. She worked on the Yankee Stadium event for Nelson Mandela upon his release from Robbins Island; was Event Director for the 1993 Presidential Inauguration; and was Co-Executive Director of the 1997 Presidential Inauguration. Additionally, in 1997 Willhite served as Executive Director of the Denver Summit of the Eight, the first meeting of the G7 to include Russia.

Willhite was a partner at FieldWorks, Washington, D.C from 2003-2007. While there, she directed many successful campaigns for clients that included the 2004 League of Conservation Voters canvass, the largest outreach to environmental voters executed at that time. Along with this, she led CANader, the successful grassroots campaign that targeted previous Ralph Nader voters and encouraged them to vote for the Democratic nominee rather than Nader. She also founded TIPPAC (Truth in Politics PAC) in Utah to bring attention to the corruption in the Salt Lake County GOP, and worked to structure VoteVets in 2006, supporting its initial political goal to elect supporters of the 21st Century veterans. In 2006-07 Willhite was instrumental in forging the successful bid of the Denver Host Committee to get the 2008 Convention to Denver.

Willhite returned to live in Arkansas in 2006. She continued her work for the Democratic Party and progressive candidates. Her efforts in Arkansas included work on Hillary Clinton's 2008 campaign. She also served as a field consultant to the 2006 campaigns of Governor Mike Beebe and Representative Kathy Webb. She helped organize Tobacco-Free Kids, The Susan G. Komen for the “Share the Cure” campaign, and the Environmental Defense Fund. She ran the campaign of Alice Lightle for District Judge and for Arkansas Families First. She also worked with the Arkansas House Democratic Caucus Leadership.

In 2013, Willhite joined the Arkansas Insurance Department as Chief Operating Officer of the Arkansas Health Connector, the implementation of the Affordable Care Act in the state. She managed a staff of 40 in-house specialists and over 100 statewide outreach facilitators. Arkansas enrolled over 150,000 citizens in the program.

In December 2019, Debbie joined the Mike Bloomberg for President campaign where she served as Sr. Advisor for the Western Region.

Willhite is a US Navy Veteran serving on Active Duty at CINCLANTFLT, in Norfolk, VA, and then in the Reserves attached to a Seabee Unit in Plainville, CT. Honorably Discharged.
