= Governor Morrow =

Governor Morrow may refer to:

- Edwin P. Morrow (1877–1935), 40th Governor of Kentucky
- Jay Johnson Morrow (1870–1937), 3rd Governor of the Panama Canal Zone from 1921 to 1924
- Jeremiah Morrow (1771–1852), 9th Governor of Ohio
