= George Morrow =

George Morrow may refer to:

- George E. Morrow (1840–1900), American academic
- George Morrow (cricketer) (1877–1914), Irish cricketer
- George Morrow (computers) (1934–2003), promoted the S-100 bus
- George Morrow (bassist) (1925–1992), jazz musician
- George Morrow (illustrator) (1869–1955), Irish artist
