= Thomas Lloyd (stenographer) =

Anglo-American stenographer (1756–1827)

Thomas Lloyd (1756 – 1827), known as the "Father of American Shorthand," was born in London on August 14 to William and Hannah Biddle Lloyd. Lloyd studied at the College of St. Omer in Flanders, where he first learned his method of shorthand. This very method of shorthand earned him his nickname as he published the most complete and official record of the First Continental Congress from the notes taken in his shorthand. Some of his other prominent accomplishments include working for the United States Treasurer and reporting the first Inaugural Address given by George Washington, which was then published in the Gazette of the United States.

== Life ==
=== Soldier ===
Immigrating just prior to the outbreak of the American Revolutionary War, Lloyd joined the effort by volunteering for the Fifth Independent Company of the Maryland Militia with whom he fought in the Long Island campaign during 1776, and upon its disbandment, enlisted in the Fourth Company of the Fourth Regiment of Maryland. Wounded at the Battle of Brandywine, Lloyd was discharged in February 1779.

=== Stenographer ===
Lloyd married Mary Carson in 1780 and moved to Philadelphia where he generated a reputation as a skilled stenographer and teacher. His continued interest in politics lead him to attend the first session of the Federal Congress. His publication of the record for that session earned him a permanent position in all Congressional debates. His publication, the Congressional Register, became widely known as the most accurate and official documentation of debates and was used frequently by individual Congressmen for quotes. As Lloyd's publishing career continued, his partisan work brought criticism from outside sources. Failing to publish his notes from the Maryland Convention and the anti-Federalist speeches from the Pennsylvania Convention, Lloyd earned a reputation as an ardent supporter of the Constitution, but also earned criticism from fellow journalists and political figures alike who accused him of taking bribes. In 1789, Lloyd reported on the first session of the First House of Representatives and was appointed official recorder for the second session. While Lloyd continued recording various political debates and Congressional sessions, his publication of the Register concluded in 1790.

=== In London ===
After the end of Lloyd's publications, he returned to London with his family in 1791. Hitting a string of bad luck, Lloyd was put in Newgate prison for debt and upon his release, returned to the United States in hopes of once again publishing his recordings. However, upon his return, Lloyd was not given back his position with Congress and found himself out of work.

=== Method Published ===
Mathew Carey, prominent publisher and employee of the Pennsylvania Herald worked with Lloyd to learn his method of shorthand and in January 1793, published The System of Shorthand Practiced by Thomas Lloyd in Taking Down the Debates of Congress and Now (With His Permission) Published for General Use.

== Legacy ==
The last known publication by Lloyd was a work that compiled the full structure of his shorthand system that ended up being his legacy that was published in 1819. His book, Lloyd's Stenography, was designed to be sold as a manual to those wishing to learn shorthand.

Lloyd died on January 19, 1827, and was buried in the cemetery of St. Augustine Church which is located on Fourth, near Vine, in Philadelphia. He was survived by three daughters and Maria Daly Shea who was raised in his household and eventually became the heir of the Lloyd family papers.
