= William Morrow =

William or Bill Morrow may refer to:

== Politics ==
- William W. Morrow (1843–1929), Republican U.S. Representative from California, 1885–1891 and Federal judge
- William Morrow (South Australian politician) (1872–1934), member of South Australian Legislative Council
- Bill Morrow (Australian politician) (1891–1980), Labor Party Senator from Tasmania, 1947–1953
- Bill Morrow (California politician) (born 1954), U.S. Republican politician from the state of California
- Bill Morrow (Canadian politician) (fl. 2006)

== Arts ==
- W. C. Morrow (1854–1923), American writer
- William Morrow (screenwriter) (1907–1971), comedic screenwriter

== Sports ==
- William M. Morrow (1866–1944), American football player and World War I army general
- Bill Morrow (footballer) (1928–2002), Australian footballer for Melbourne
- William Morrow (footballer) (1851–1922), Irish footballer

== Religion ==
- William Morrow (priest) (1869–1950), Anglican Provost of Chelmsford
- William D. Morrow, General Superintendent of the Pentecostal Assemblies of Canada

== Others ==
- William Morrow (physician) (1903–1977), Australian physician and specialist in gastroenterology
- William Morrow (publisher) (1873–1931), American publisher
  - William Morrow and Company, the publishing house he began, now an imprint of HarperCollins
- Bill Morrow (executive) (born 1959), corporate CEO
