= Morrow Hall =

- U.S. National Register of Historic Places
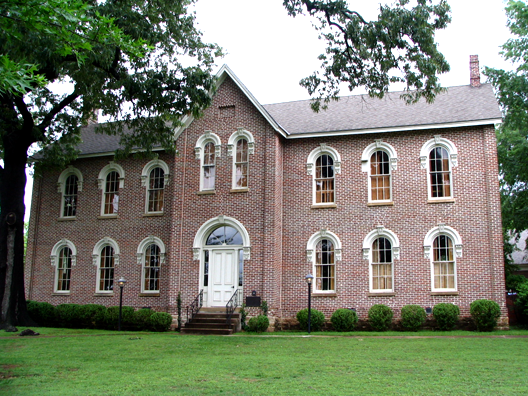
- Morrow Hall in 2006

- Location within Arkansas Location within the United States
- Location: 775 E. Boswell St., Batesville, Arkansas
- Coordinates: 35.7727°N 91.6466°W
- Architectural style: Renaissance
- NRHP reference No.: 72000205
- Added to NRHP: October 18, 1972

Morrow Hall is a historic building in Batesville, Arkansas. It was entered into the National Register of Historic Places in October 1972.

Built in 1873, this was the first permanent building of Arkansas College (now Lyon College), the oldest continuing private college in the state of Arkansas. Three other academic buildings once stood on the block - the Long Memorial Building, on the site of the Presbyterian sanctuary; the chapel, which stood between Long and Morrow; and the gymnasium, which has been remodeled to serve as the present church Fellowship Hall, immediately behind Morrow.

Morrow Hall stands as it was originally built. It is an "academic house," with Italianate pressed tin window trim and projecting central bay. It is now used by the First Presbyterian Church.
