= Jesse Morrow Mountain =

Mountain in California, United States

- Location within California

Highest point
- Elevation: 2,108 ft (643 m) NGVD 29
- Coordinates: 36°44′10″N 119°24′29″W

Geography
- Location: Fresno County, California, U.S.
- Topo map: USGS Wahtoke

Jesse Morrow Mountain is located in Fresno County, California. In December 2012, construction company Cemex agreed not to pursue mining operations which would turn much of the mountain into gravel for building projects.

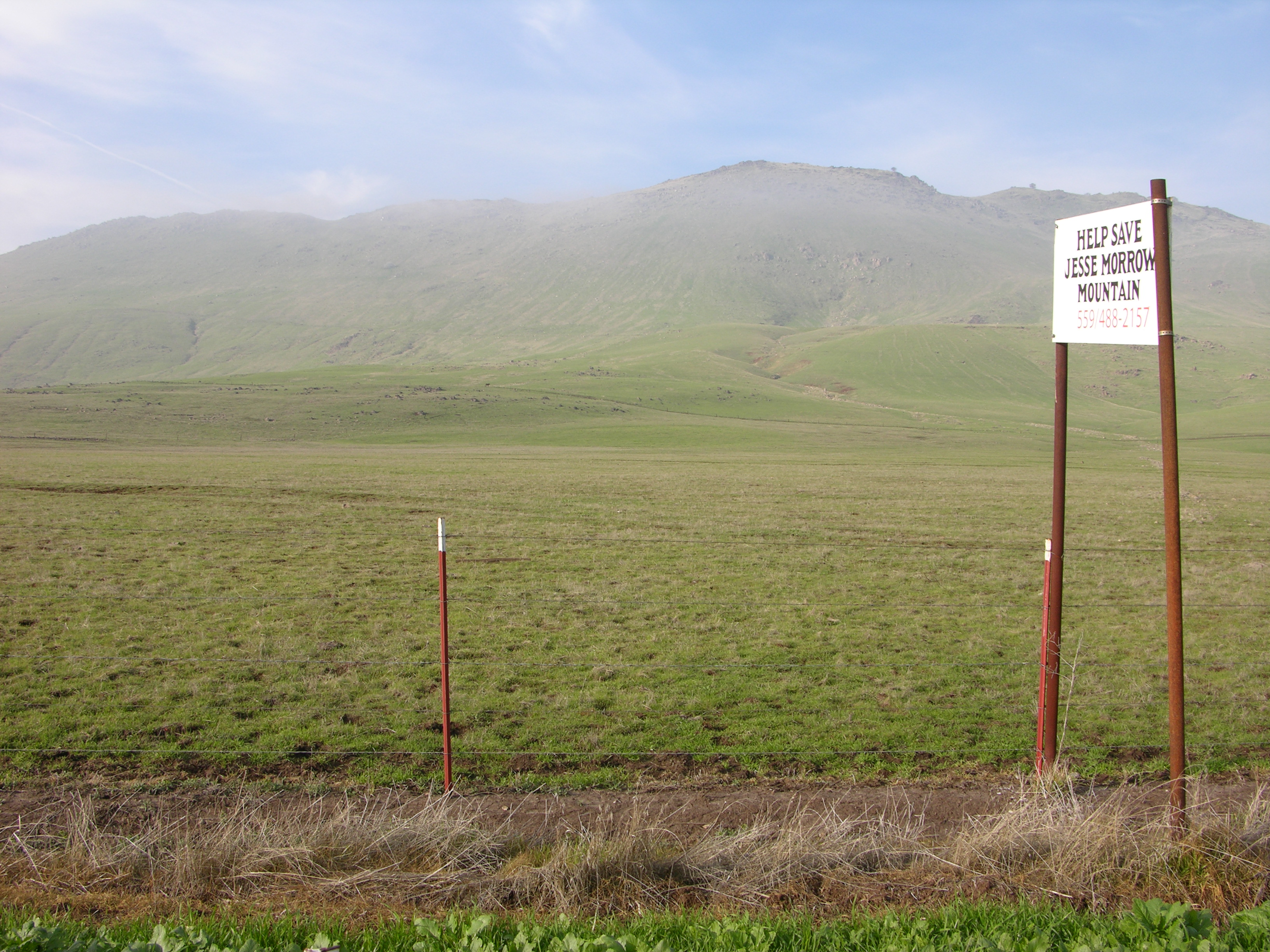
Jesse Morrow Mountain
