= Commonwealth v. Morrow =

Commonwealth v. Morrow (1815) was a Pennsylvania decision by the Adjourned Court of Quarter Sessions for the County of Allegheny on the issue of labor unionization. The jury in this case agreed that the master shoemakers, the journeymen, and the public, were endangered by the association of journeymen and returned a verdict of guilty on charges of conspiracy. The Pittsburgh Cordwainers and the Court's ruling on Commonwealth v. Morrow reaffirmed the Court's views on the earliest forms of American labor unionization —that activities performed by these unions were unlawful. Prosecutors summoned former members of the journeymen and master cordwainers, most of the owners of the shops. These witnesses provided accounts of collective bargaining, which drove nonmembers out of the work force by refusing to work with them. Defendants argued that every man has a right to determine his own desired wages and doing so as a collective unit was lawful. This court case established the formation of unions and its activities as unlawful, in the form of conspiracy. The legality of unions as a legitimate entity would be established 25 years later in Commonwealth v. Hunt, a Massachusetts Supreme Court Decision. Commonwealth v. Morrow, however, serves as an example of early unionization of workers in the United States, and the challenges it faced.

== Background ==
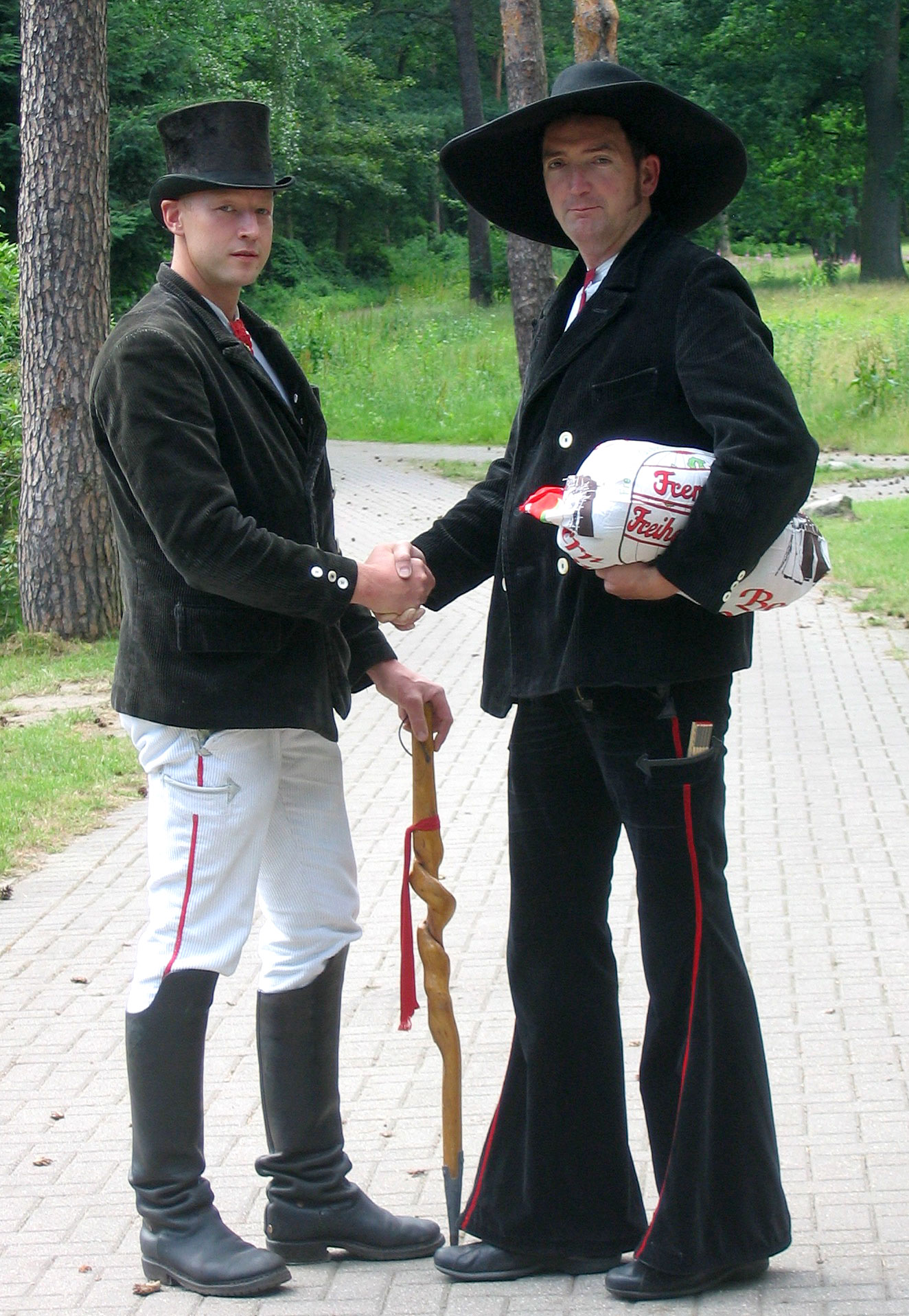
German wandering journeymen in traditional uniform

In nearly all the major cities, shoemakers (cordwainers) and printers were among the first to form workingmen's societies; carpenters, masons, hatters, riggers, and tailors also found it worthwhile to organize. As the number of workers in manufacturing industries rose, so did their activities to organize for their benefit. Commonwealth of Pennsylvania accused George Morrow, along with 21 other members of the journeymen cordwainers, of "unlawfully, perniciously and deceitfully, designing and intending to form and unite themselves into an unlawful society for the purpose of unjustly raising the price of their wages and the wages of all journeymen cordwainers in Pittsburgh." The trial was held at an Adjourned Court of Quarter Sessions for the County of Allegheny at Pittsburgh on December 10, 1815, The counsel for the prosecution was Attorney General Samuel Douglas, along with Henry Baldwin and William Wilkins. The counsel for the defendants was Walter Forward and Parker Campbell.

Before the landmark decision in Commonwealth v. Hunt, several generations of Americans, including lawyers, judges and legislators, have been convinced by their teachers to believe that the most effective legal weapon against the struggling labor union was the doctrine that concerted activities were conspiracies, and for that reason, illegal.

== Prosecution ==
Douglas argued that the indictment contained three counts. The first was for combining and conspiring together to form a society for purposes "highly prejudicial both to individuals and society in general." The second charge was the "formation of that society in pursuance of such confederacy." The third charge was the "acts resulting from that confederacy injurious to employers, to journeymen, to Pittsburgh, and the whole community. Witnesses for prosecution included former members of the journeymen cordwainers, such as Adam Moreland and John M. Phillips, and master cordwainers, such as Walter Glenn. Adam Moreland, one of the first members of the society testified, “the means we took to get our wages were a turn-out.., scabbing a shop is leaving it (society) and those who worked there after that were scabs. John M. Phillips, a relatively new resident of Pittsburgh and former member of the journeymen cordwainers, testified that the manner of joining the society involved putting a printed bill of wages in the Bible, and then swearing to work for no less wage than the bill contained." He further claimed that many members of the society, including himself, were compelled to take the oath or leave the society, and consequence was you would be expelled from the town…as no one would work or board with an expelled member." Walter Glenn employed three of the journeymen defendants (Mindeher, Meloney, and Hughes) along with his (Glenn's) brother. When Glenn declined to sign the turn-out and the new prices requested by Mindeher, Meloney, and Hughes, they all left him, including his brother. When asked to return to work week after turn-out, he said he could not work on account that he “would gain enemies by it or be found fault with him." He later testified that he was forced to dump $1100–$1200 worth of stock at one point as a result of the wage demands by the journeymen.

== Defense ==
Walter Forward, counsel for the defendants, argued three main points. First, he argued, "every man has a right to affix his own prices to his own labors, and it was not a crime to have a uniform price for price they pleased for their work." Secondly he argued that the wage demands by the journeymen were reasonable and there were no proven charges of extortion. The third argument was that journeymen wages, before the creation of such association, were too low and could not obtain fair price by any other means than the association. Mr. Moreland, in his earlier testimony, admits to this fact as being true.

== Verdict ==
The jury in this case agreed that the master shoemakers, the journeymen, and the public were endangered by the association of journeymen and returned a verdict of guilty of conspiracy, although the court fined the defendants only $1 each, plus prosecution costs.

== Implications ==
The early craft societies, mainly shoemakers and printers, were typically transitory. Cyclical economic downturns routinely dissolved worker collective actions, and wage reductions, though resisted, were common during downturns in the economy. Another deterrent to unionization came from court actions. Conservative judges, in their instructions to juries, contended that union action per se was illegal. Commonwealth v. Morrow was first of many of the legal cases that challenged the "common law police power maintained in many of the preceding cases." The case largely followed what had by now emerged as a normal pattern—prosecution disclaimers of hostility to the journeymen and promises of a light penalty.

The case was a breakthrough in that the court indicted the defendants, not for demanding high prices, but for employing unlawful means to extort those prices. It also redefined the definition of conspiracy as a "combination to effect an unlawful purpose or to effect a lawful purpose by unlawful means. Threats and violence would qualify as conspiracy, but not the simple act of writing and adopting a constitution or a collective refusal to work unless a nonmember were discharged.”

Commonwealth v. Morrow was one of the many cases that helped transform labor unionization from an act of conspiracy to legitimate means of personal expression. Over the next few years, the apparent precariousness of the journeymen's legal position would become somewhat qualified, as sum by the decline in the incidence of prosecution regarding unionization and collective bargaining of wages.

== See also ==
- Commonwealth v. Hunt
- Conspiracy (civil)
