= Russell O. Morrow =

American politician

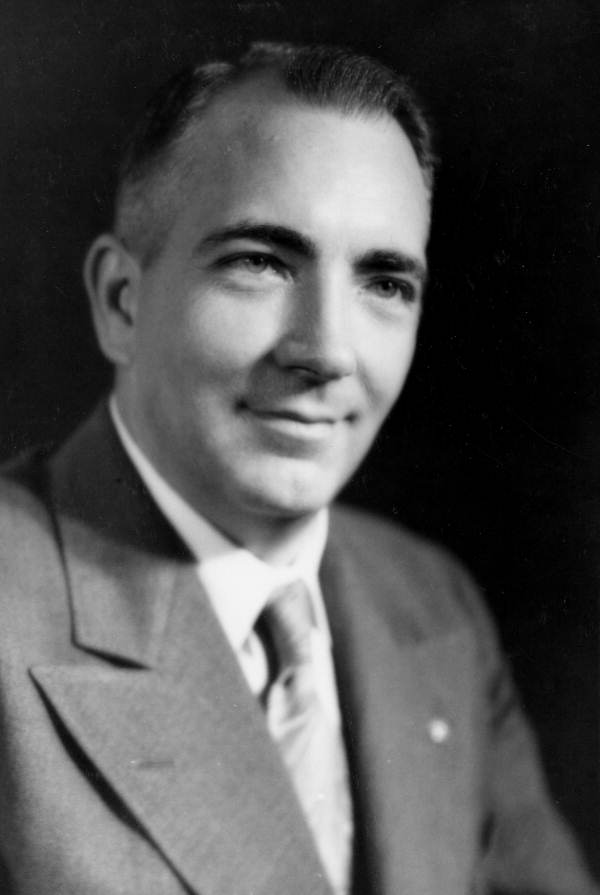
- Morrow in 1947

Member of the Florida House of Representatives from Palm Beach County
- In office 1937–1941
- In office 1947–1948

Member of the Florida Senate from the 35th district
- In office 1951–1955
- Preceded by: John R. Beacham
- Succeeded by: Fred O. Dickinson Jr.

Personal details
- Born: October 27, 1907
- Died: November 24, 1984 (aged 77)
- Party: Democratic

Russell O. Morrow (October 27, 1907 – November 24, 1984) was an American politician. He served as a Democratic member of the Florida House of Representatives. He also served as a member for the 35th district of the Florida Senate.
