= Bob Morrow (American football) =

American football player and coach (1918–2003)

- Morrow in 1946

No. 48, 43, 61
- Position: Back

Personal information
- Born: May 5, 1918; Madison, Wisconsin, U.S.
- Died: July 9, 2003 (aged 85); Stuart, Florida, U.S.
- Listed height: 6 ft 0 in (1.83 m)
- Listed weight: 222 lb (101 kg)

Career information
- High school: Bloom (Chicago Heights, Illinois)
- College: Illinois Wesleyan
- NFL draft: 1941: 12th round, 108th overall pick

Career history
- Chicago Cardinals (1941–1943); New York Giants (1945); New York Yankees (1946)

Career NFL statistics
- Rushing yards: 456
- Rushing average: 3.6
- Rushing touchdowns: 4
- Stats at Pro Football Reference

Robert Edward Morrow (May 5, 1918 – July 9, 2003) was an American professional football player and coach. He played as a fullback in the National Football League (NFL). Morrow was drafted in the 12th round of the 1941 NFL draft by the Chicago Bears and played that season with the Chicago Cardinals. He played two more seasons with the team before spending a year away from the NFL. During the 1945 NFL season, he was a member of the New York Giants. The following season, he played with the New York Yankees. Morrow served as the head football coach at his alma mater, Illinois Wesleyan University, from 1947 to 1950.

== Head coaching record ==
Year	Team	Overall	Conference	Standing	Bowl/playoffs
Illinois Wesleyan Titans (College Conference of Illinois) (1947–1950)
1947	Illinois Wesleyan	3–5–1	2–2–1	T–5th	
1948	Illinois Wesleyan	7–3	5–0	1st	
1949	Illinois Wesleyan	4–5	2–2	T–4th	
1950	Illinois Wesleyan	5–3	5–1	2nd	
Illinois Wesleyan:		19–16–1	15–5–1		
Total:		19–16–1			
National championship Conference title Conference division title or championship game berth
