= R v Journeymen-Taylors of Cambridge =

English labour law case

- Citation: (1721) 8 Mod 10, 88 ER 9

Keywords
- Contract of employment, terms

R v Journeymen-Taylors of Cambridge (1721) 88 ER 9 is a labour law case, concerning the historical attitude of the common law to trade unions. It held that strike action amounted to an unlawful and criminal conspiracy. This attitude prevailed through the 19th century, until trade unions were made lawful by Parliament in the Trade Union Act 1871 and the Conspiracy, and Protection of Property Act 1875. The Trade Disputes Act 1906 confirmed unions' legality at common law once more, and now the position is reflected in international law, particularly the ILO Convention No 87 and 98.

== Facts ==
A group of workers had founded the London Journeymen Tailors' Union and held a strike the following year. In response, the Journeymen Tailors, London Act 1720 was passed. A case was brought that the union constituted an unlawful conspiracy.

== Judgment ==
The court heard that the agreement would be contrary to the Journeymen Tailors, London Act 1720. It found, however, that it was unnecessary to rely on the Act, because the union's actions were unlawful at common law.

However, it was not for refusing to work that the defendants were indicted, but "for conspiring." As the judgment of 6 November 1721 stated:

It is true, the indictment sets forth, that the defendants refused to work under such rates, which were more than enjoined by the statute, for that is only two shillings a day; but yet these words will not bring the offence, for which the defendants are indicted, to be within the statute, because it is not the denial to work except for more wages than is allowed by the statute, but it is for a conspiracy to raise their wages for which these defendants are indicted...This indictment need not conclude contra formam statuti, because it is for a conspiracy, which is an offence at common law."

== See also ==
- UK labour law
- US labor law
- UK labour law history
- US labor history
