= Bruce Morrow (author) =

American writer and editor

- Born: December 3, 1963 (age 62); Cleveland, Ohio
- Occupation: Writer

Bruce Morrow (born 1963 in Cleveland, Ohio) is an American, LGBTQ writer and editor living in New York City.

== Biography ==
Bruce Morrow was born in Cleveland, Ohio, and attended Rochester Institute of Technology from 1981 to 1985. For seven years, he served as a research associate at the College of Physicians and Surgeons at Columbia University. He then received his Master’s of Fine Arts degree in Creative Writing - Fiction from Columbia University School of the Arts in 1992. He was the associate director of Teachers & Writers Collaborative in New York City for eleven years and received a Charles H. Revson Foundation Fellowship for Mid-Career Civic Leaders at Columbia University, in 2007.

From 1991 to 2000, Morrow was on the editorial board of Callaloo: A Journal of African American and African Diaspora Arts & Letters. In 1994, he published an essay in The New York Times titled "Gay and Black: A High-Wire Act," which described his early experiences of living in New York City: "It feels like I'm balancing on a thin wire strung across the city. Sometimes I can glide effortlessly...other times the wire trembles." In 1996 he co-edited Shade: An Anthology of Fiction by Gay Men of African Descent (Avon Books), the first anthology of fiction by black gay men to be published by a major publisher. The introduction was written by Samuel R. Delany and the afterword by co-editor Charles H. Rowell. The publication of Shade was heralded by Publishers Weekly. His research and other papers associated with "Shade" have been donated to the "In The Life Archives" at the Schomburg Center for Research in Black Culture of the New York Public Library.

Morrow has published numerous articles, essays, and short stories in anthologies such as "Men on Men 2000," "Speak My Name: Black Men on Masculinity and the American Dream" (Don Belton, editor), "Go the Way the Blood Beats: An Anthology of Lesbian and Gay Fiction by African-American Writers" (Shawn Stewart Ruff, editor), "Freedom in this Village: Twenty-Five Years of Black Gay Men's Writing" (E. Lynn Harris, editor), "Blithe House Quarterly," "Ancestral House: The Black Short Story in the Americas and Europe" (Charles H. Rowell, editor), "Imagining America: Stories from the Promised Land: A Multicultural Anthology of American Fiction" (Wesley Brown & Amy Ling, editors), "Mama's Boy: Gay Men Writing about their Mothers" (Dean Kostos & Eugene Grygo, editors), and "Step into A World: A Global Anthology of the New Black Literature" (Kevin Powell, editor).

== Works ==
| Title | Role(s) |
|---|---|
| Men on Men 2000: Best New Gay Fiction for the Millennium | Contributor |
| Go The Way Your Blood Beats: An Anthology of Lesbian and Gay Fiction by African-American Writers | Contributor |
| Shade: An Anthology of Fiction by Gay Men of African Descent | Editor, Contributor |
| Freedom in This Village: Twenty-Five Years of Black Gay Men's Writing | Contributor |
| Fighting words : Personal Essays by Black Gay Men | Contributor |
| Black Silk: A Collection of African American Erotica | Contributor |
| Voices Rising: Celebrating 20 Years of Black Lesbian, Gay, Bisexual and Transgender Writing | Contributor |

== Bibliography ==
- "Gay and Black: A High-Wire Act," New York Times (1994)
- "Shade: An Anthology of Fiction by Gay Men of African Descent" (Bruce Morrow and Charles Rowell, editors,1996)
