= List of United States political families (M) =

The following is an alphabetical list of political families in the United States whose last name begins with M.

== The Mabeys ==
- Charles R. Mabey (1877–1959), Mayor of Bountiful, Utah; Utah State Representative 1913–16; Governor of Utah 1921–25; delegate to the Republican National Convention 1924. Father of Rendell N. Mabey.
  - Rendell N. Mabey, delegate to the Republican National Convention 1936, Utah State Representative 1942–50, candidate for Governor of Utah 1948, Utah State Senator 1951–56. Son of Charles R. Mabey.

== The MacArthurs ==
- Arthur MacArthur Sr. (1815–1896), Governor of Wisconsin (1856)
  - Arthur MacArthur Jr. (1845–1912), his son; Army general, military governor of the Philippines 1900–01
    - Douglas MacArthur (1880–1964), his son; Chief of Staff of the United States Army 1930–35, Pacific Theater Commander 1941–45, Supreme Commander of the Allied Powers (SCAP) of Occupied Japan 1945–51, Commander of UN Forces in Korea 1950–51, Candidate for President of the United States, 1952.
      - Douglas MacArthur II (1909–1997), nephew of Douglas MacArthur and son-in-law of Alben Barkley; U.S. Vice Consul in Vancouver, British Columbia, Canada 1935; U.S. Vice Consul in Naples, Italy 1937–38; U.S. Vice Consul in Paris, France 1944; U.S. Ambassador to Japan 1957–61; Belgium 1961–65; Austria 1967–69; and Iran 1969–72.

NOTE: Douglas MacArthur was also brother-in-law of U.S. Minister James H.R. Cromwell.

== The Macks, Shepards and Connallys ==
- John Levi Sheppard (1852–1902), Democratic Congressman from Texas
  - Morris Sheppard (1875–1941), Democratic Congressman and Senator from Texas, son of John L. Sheppard
  - Tom Connally (1877–1963), Democratic Congressman and Senator from Texas, married Sheppard's widow
    - Richard S. Arnold (1936–2004), candidate for U.S. Representative from Arkansas 1966 1972, delegate to the Democratic National Convention 1968, delegate to the Arkansas Constitutional Convention 1969 1970, U.S. District Court Judge in Arkansas 1978–80, Judge of the U.S. Court of Appeals 1980–2001. Great-grandson of John Levi Sheppard.
    - Connie Mack III (born 1940, Republican Congressman 1983–89 and Senator from Florida 1989–2001, Connally's step-grandson and Sheppard's maternal grandson
    - Morris S. Arnold (born 1941), U.S. District Court Judge in Arkansas 1985–92, Judge of the U.S. Court of Appeals 1992–2006. Great-grandson of John Levi Sheppard.
      - Connie Mack IV (born 1967), son of Connie Mack III, Congressman from Florida 2005-2013
      - Mary Bono (born 1961), former wife of Connie Mack IV, Congresswoman from California 1998-2013

NOTE: Mary Bono is also widow of U.S. Representative Sonny Bono.

== The Macks and Wadsworths ==
- Norman Edward Mack (1858–1932), delegate to the Democratic National Convention 1896 1900 1908 1912 1924 1928, Democratic National Committeeman 1900–30, Chairman of the Democratic National Committee 1908, Chairman of the New York Democratic Party 1911–12. Husband of Harriet Mack.
- Harriet Mack, delegate to the Democratic National Convention 1936 1940 1944. Wife of Norman Edward Mack.
  - George Wadsworth (1893–1958), U.S. Vice Consul in Nantes, France 1917–19; U.S. Vice Consul in Constantinople, Ottoman Empire 1919–20; U.S. Vice Consul in Sofia, Bulgaria 1920; U.S. Vice Consul in Alexandria, Egypt 1920–21; U.S. Consul in Cairo, Egypt 1922–24 1928–31; U.S. Consul General in Bucharest, Romania 1935; U.S. Consul General in Jerusalem, Israel 1936–40; U.S. Chargé d'affaires to Italy 1941; U.S. Consul General in Damascus, Syria 1942–44; U.S. Consul General in Damascus, Lebanon 1942–44; U.S. Diplomatic Agent to Syria 1942–44; U.S. Diplomatic Agent to Lebanon 1942–44; U.S. Minister to Lebanon 1944–47; U.S. Minister to Syria 1944–47; U.S. Minister to Iraq 1946–48; U.S. Minister to Yemen 1953–57; U.S. Ambassador to Turkey 1948–52; U.S. Ambassador to Czechoslovakia 1952–53; U.S. Ambassador to Saudi Arabia 1953–58. Son-in-law of Norman Edward Mack and Harriet Mack.

== The Maclays ==
- William Maclay (1737–1804), Clerk of Northumberland County, Pennsylvania; member of the Pennsylvania Legislature; Judge of Court of Common Pleas in Pennsylvania; U.S. Senator from Pennsylvania 1789–91; Pennsylvania State Representative 1795–97 1803; Dauphin County, Pennsylvania Judge 1801–03. Brother of Samuel Maclay.
- Samuel Maclay (1741–1811), member of the Pennsylvania Legislature 1787–91 1797, Judge of Franklin County, Pennsylvania 1792–95; U.S. Representative from Pennsylvania 1795–97; Pennsylvania State Senator 1798–1802; U.S. Senator from Pennsylvania 1803–09. Brother of William Maclay.
  - William Plunkett Maclay (1774–1842), Prothonotary of Mifflin County, Pennsylvania 1808–14; Pennsylvania State Representative; U.S. Representative from Pennsylvania 1915–21; delegate to the Pennsylvania Constitutional Convention 1837. Son of Samuel Maclay.

== The MacVeaghs and Camerons ==
- William Cameron (1795–1877), delegate to the Republican National Convention 1860. Brother of Simon Cameron.
- Simon Cameron (1799–1889), U.S. Senator from Pennsylvania 1845–49 1857–61 1867–77, candidate for Republican nomination for President of the United States 1860, U.S. Secretary of War 1861–62, U.S. Minister to Russia 1862. Brother of William Cameron.
  - J. Donald Cameron (1833–1918), U.S. Secretary of War 1876–77, U.S. Senator from Pennsylvania 1877–97, Chairman of the Republican National Committee 1879–80. Son of Simon Cameron.
  - Wayne MacVeagh (1833–1917), Chairman of the Pennsylvania Republican Party 1863, delegate to the Pennsylvania Constitutional Convention 1872, U.S. Ambassador to Turkey 1870–71, U.S. Attorney General 1881. Son-in-law of Simon Cameron.
  - Franklin MacVeagh (1837–1834), U.S. Secretary of the Treasury 1909–13. Brother of Wayne MacVeagh.
    - Charles MacVeagh (1860–1931), U.S. Ambassador to Japan 1925–28. Son of Wayne MacVeagh.
      - Lincoln MacVeagh (1890–1972), U.S. Ambassador to Greece 1933–41 1943–47, U.S. Ambassador to Iceland 1941–42, U.S. Ambassador to South Africa 1942–43, U.S. Ambassador to Portugal 1948–52, U.S. Ambassador to Spain 1952–53. Son of Charles MacVeagh.

NOTE: J. Donald Cameron was also nephew by marriage of U.S. Secretary of War William Tecumseh Sherman.

== The Madigans ==
- Edward R. Madigan (1936–1994), Illinois State Representative 1967–72, U.S. Representative from Illinois 1973–91, delegate to the Republican National Convention 1980, U.S. Secretary of Agriculture 1991–93. Brother of Robert Madigan.
- Robert Madigan (1942–2006), Clerk of Lincoln, Illinois; Illinois State Senator. Brother Edward R. Madigan.

== The Madigans (II) ==
- Michael Madigan, Illinois House Speaker and Chairman of the Illinois Democratic Party. Adoptive father of Lisa Madigan
  - Lisa Madigan, Illinois Attorney General Adopted daughter of Michael Madigan

NOTE: Not related to Edward R. and Robert Madigan.

== The Madisons ==
- Thomas Madison (1746–1798), Sheriff of Augusta County, Virginia. Brother of George Madison.
- George Madison (1763–1816), Kentucky Auditor of Public Accounts 1796–1816, Governor of Kentucky 1816. Brother of Thomas Madison.
- James Madison (1751–1836), member of the Virginia Legislature 1776, Delegate to the Continental Congress from Virginia 1780–83 1787–88, delegate to the U.S. Constitutional Convention 1787, U.S. Representative from Virginia 1789–97, U.S. Secretary of State 1801–09, President of the United States 1809–17. Second cousin of Thomas Madison and George Madison.

NOTE: Thomas Madison was also brother-in-law of Virginia Governor Patrick Henry. James Madison was also second cousin of U.S. President Zachary Taylor, second cousin thrice removed of Missouri Governor Elliot Woolfolk Major and Missouri legislator Edgar Bailey Woolfolk, and brother-in-law of U.S. Representative John G. Jackson and U.S. Supreme Court Justice Thomas Todd.

== The Magees ==
- Walter W. Magee (1861–1927), U.S. Representative from New York 1915–27. Brother of Edward M. Magee.
- Edward M. Magee (1863–1934), New York Assemblyman 1913–15. Brother of Water W. Magee.

== The Magoffins, Shannons, and Shelbys ==
- Isaac Shelby (1750–1826), member of the Virginia Legislature 1779, member of the North Carolina Legislature 1779, delegate to the Kentucky Constitutional Convention 1792, Governor of Kentucky 1792–96 1812–16. Father-in-law of James Shannon.
  - Anthony B. Shelby (1789–1851), Justice of the Texas Supreme Court 1839–41. Cousin of Isaac Shelby.
  - Charles Stewart Todd (1791–1871), United States Ambassador to Russia 1841–46. Son-in-law of Isaac Shelby.
  - James Shannon (1791–1832), U.S. Chargé d'affaires to Central America 1832. Son-in-law of Isaac Shelby.
    - Beriah Magoffin (1815–1885), Kentucky State Court Judge 1840, Kentucky State Senator 1850, delegate to the Democratic National Convention 1856, Governor of Kentucky 1859–62, Kentucky State Representative 1867. Grandson-in-law of Isaac Shelby.
      - David Davie Shelby (1847–1914), Judge of the United States Court of Appeals for the Fifth Circuit 1899–1914. Grandson of Anthony B. Shelby.

NOTE: James Shannon was also brother of Kentucky State Representative George Shannon and U.S. Representatives Thomas Shannon and Wilson Shannon and granduncle of U.S. Representative Isaac C. Parker. Charles Stewart Todd was also son of Supreme Court Justice Thomas Todd.

== The Majors ==
- Benjamin Porter Major, Missouri State Senator. Cousin of Samuel Collier Major.
- Samuel Collier Major (1840–1894), Missouri State Senator. Cousin of Benjamin Porter Major.
  - Pryor J. Foree, Missouri State Representative. Second cousin once removed of Benjamin Porter Major and Samuel Collier Major.
  - Samuel C. Major (1869–1931), Prosecuting Attorney of Howard County, Missouri; Missouri State Senator 1907–11; candidate for U.S. Representative from Missouri 1916; U.S. Representative from Missouri 1919–21 1923–29 1931. Son of Samuel Collier Major.

== The Mallorys ==
- Stephen Mallory (1813–1873), U.S. Senator from Florida 1851–61, Confederate States Secretary of the Navy 1861–65. Father of Stephen Mallory II.
  - Stephen Mallory II (1834–1907), Florida State Representative 1877–79, Florida State Senator 1881–89, U.S. Representative from Florida 1891–95, U.S. Senator from Florida 1897–1907. Son of Stephen Mallory.

== The Malones and O'Gormans ==
- James Aloysius O'Gorman (1860–1943), District Court Judge in New York 1893–99, delegate to the Democratic National Convention 1896 1912 1916, Justice of the New York Supreme Court 1900–11, U.S. Senator from New York 1911–17. Father-in-law of Dudley Field Malone.
  - Dudley Field Malone (1882–1950), U.S. Collector of Customs of New York City 1913–17, candidate for Governor of New York 1920, delegate to the Democratic National Convention 1932. Son-in-law of James Aloysius O'Gorman.

== The Manchins ==
- A. James Manchin (1927–2003), Secretary of State and State Treasurer of West Virginia. Member, West Virginia House of Delegates. Uncle of Joseph Manchin III and Tim Manchin.
  - Dr. Mark Manchin, Son of A. James Manchin, West Virginia State Senate, Superintendent, McDowell County Schools; School Building Authority Executive Director.
  - Tim Manchin (born 1955), West Virginia House of Delegates, November 2003 – present
  - Joseph Manchin III (born 1947), West Virginia House Delegate 1982–86, West Virginia State Senator 1986–96, candidate for Democratic nomination for Governor of West Virginia 1996, West Virginia Secretary of State 2001–05, Governor of West Virginia 2005–10, U.S. Senator from West Virginia 2010–2025. Cousin of Tim Manchin and nephew of A. James Manchin.
  - Gayle Conelly Manchin (born 1947) Member of the West Virginia Board of Education from 2007 to 2015, West Virginia Secretary of Education and the Arts 16 January 2017 – 12 March 2018, Federal Co-Chair of the Appalachian Regional Commission May 6, 2021–present. Wife of Senator Joe Manchin.

== The Manlys ==
- Charles Manly (1795–1871), Governor of North Carolina 1849–51. Brother of Matthias Evans Manly.
- Matthias Evans Manly (1801–1881), member of the North Carolina House of Commons, Judge of the North Carolina Superior Court, Justice of the North Carolina Supreme Court, North Carolina State Senator. Brother of Charles Manly.

== The Manners and Pralls ==
- John Manners (1786–1853), New Jersey State Senator 1850–52. First cousin of David Stout Manners.
- David Stout Manners (1808–1884), Mayor of Jersey City, New Jersey 1952–1857. First cousin of John Manners.
  - Horace Griggs Prall (1881–1951), New Jersey Assemblyman 1926–27, New Jersey State Senator 1928–36, acting Governor of New Jersey 1935. First cousin thrice removed of John Manners.

== The Mannings ==
- James Burchill Richardson (1770–1836), Governor of South Carolina 1802–04. Uncle of Richard Irvine Manning I and John Peter Richardson II.
  - Richard Irvine Manning I (1789–1836), South Carolina State Representative 1820, South Carolina State Senator 1822, Governor of South Carolina 1824–26, U.S. Representative from South Carolina 1834–36. Nephew of James Burchill Richardson.
  - John Peter Richardson II (1801–1869), South Carolina State Representative 1825–34, South Carolina State Senator 1834–36, U.S. Representative from South Carolina 1836–39, Governor of South Carolina 1840–42. Nephew of James Burchill Richardson.
    - John Lawrence Manning (1816–1889), South Carolina State Representative 1842–46 1865–67, South Carolina State Senator 1846–52 1861–65, Governor of South Carolina 1852–54. Son of Richard Irvine Manning I.
    - John Peter Richardson III (1831–1899), South Carolina State Representative, South Carolina State Senator, Treasurer of South Carolina 1878–86, Governor of South Carolina 1886–90. Son of John Peter Richardson II.
      - Richard Irvine Manning III (1859–1931), South Carolina State Representative 1892–96, South Carolina State Senator 1898–1906, Governor of South Carolina 1915–19. Nephew of John Lawrence Manning.

== The Mansfields ==
- Frederick Mansfield (1877–1958), candidate for Governor of Massachusetts 1910 1916 1917, candidate for Treasurer of Massachusetts 1914, candidate for Mayor of Boston, Massachusetts 1929; Mayor of Boston, Massachusetts 1934–37; Treasurer of Massachusetts 1941. Father of Walter R. Mansfield.
  - Walter R. Mansfield (1911–1987), U.S. District Court Judge in New York 1966–71, Judge of the U.S. Court of Appeals 1971–81. Son of Frederick Mansfield.

== The Marchands ==
- David Marchand (1776–1832), U.S. Representative from Pennsylvania 1817–21. Father of Albert Gallatin Marchand.
  - Albert Gallatin Marchand (1811–1848), U.S. Representative from Pennsylvania 1839–43. Son of David Marchand.

== The Marins, Mendozas, and Riveras ==
- Luis Muñoz Rivera (1859–1916), Puerto Rico House Delegate 1906–10, Resident Commissioner to the U.S. Congress from Puerto Rico 1911–16. Father of Luis Muñoz Marín.
  - Luis Muñoz Marín (1898–1980), Puerto Rico Commonwealth Senator 1931–37 1941–49, Governor of Puerto Rico 1949–65. Son of Luis Muñoz Rivera.
    - Victoria Muñoz Mendoza (born 1940), candidate for Mayor of San Juan, Puerto Rico 1984; Puerto Rico Commonwealth Senator 1986–93; candidate for Governor of Puerto Rico 1992. Daughter of Luis Muñoz Marín.

== The Markells ==
- Jacob Markell (1770–1852), Justice of the Peace in New York, Supervisor of Manheim, New York 1797–1819 1824–29; Judge of Court of Common Pleas of Montgomery County, New York; U.S. Representative from New York 1813–15; New York Assemblyman 1820. Father of Henry Markell.
  - Henry Markell (1792–1831), U.S. Representative from New York 1825–29. Son of Jacob Markell.

== The Marshes ==
- Charles Marsh (1765–1849), U.S. District Attorney of Vermont 1797–1801, U.S. Representative from Vermont 1815–17. Father of George Perkins Marsh.
  - George Perkins Marsh (1801–1882), Vermont Governor's Councilman 1835, U.S. Representative from Vermont 1843–49, U.S. Minister to Turkey 1849–53, U.S. Minister to Italy 1861–82. Son of Charles Marsh.

== The Marshes of Oregon ==
- Eugene E. Marsh, Speaker of the Oregon House of Representatives 1945–47, President of the Oregon State Senate 1953–55.
  - Malcolm F. Marsh (born 1928), Judge of the United States District Court for the District of Oregon 1987–98. Nephew of Eugene E. Marsh.

== The Marshalls ==
- Robert Morris (1734–1806), Delegate to the Continental Congress from Pennsylvania 1776, U.S. Senator from Pennsylvania 1789–95. Father-in-law of James Markham Marshall.
- Jaquelin Ambler (1742–1798), Treasurer of Virginia. Father-in-law of John Marshall.
  - John Marshall (1755–1835), Virginia House Delegate 1782–89, delegate to the 1788 Virginia Constitutional Convention, U.S. Representative from Virginia 1799–1800, U.S. Secretary of State 1800–01, Chief Justice of the United States Supreme Court 1801–35. Son-in-law of Jaquelin Ambler.
  - James Markham Marshall (1764–1848), delegate to the Kentucky Constitutional Convention 1791, Judge of the United States Circuit Court of the District of Columbia 1801–03. Son-in-law of Robert Morris.
  - Alexander Keith Marshall (1771–1825), Kentucky State Representative 1797–1801. Brother of John Marshall and James Markham Marshall.
  - Humphrey Marshall (1760–1841), U.S. Senator from Kentucky 1795–1801. First cousin and brother-in-law of John Marshall, James Markham Marshall, and Alexander Keith Marshall.
    - Thomas Marshall (1784–1835), delegate to the Virginia Constitutional Convention 1829. Son of John Marshall.
    - Edward Colston (1786–1852), Virginia House Delegate 1812–14 1816–17 1823–28 1833–35, U.S. Representative from Virginia 1817–19. Nephew of John Marshall, James Markham Marshall, and Alexander Keith Marshall.
    - Thomas A. Marshall (1794–1871), Kentucky State Representative 1827–28 1863, U.S. Representative from Kentucky 1831–35, Judge of the Kentucky Court of Appeals 1835–56, Chief Justice of the Kentucky Court of Appeals 1866–67. Son of Humphrey Marshall.
    - James Keith Marshall (1800–1862), Virginia House Delegate 1839–41, Virginia State Senator 1853–62. Son of John Marshall.
    - Thomas F. Marshall (1801–1864), Kentucky State Representative 1832–36 1838–39 1854, candidate for U.S. House of Representative from Kentucky 1836, U.S. Representative from Kentucky 1841–43. Nephew of John Marshall, James Markham Marshall, and Alexander Keith Marshall.
    - Edward Carrington Marshall (1805–1882), Virginia House Delegate 1836–39. Son of John Marshall.
    - Alexander Keith Marshall (1808–1884), candidate for U.S. Representative from Kentucky 1847, U.S. Representative from Kentucky 1855–57. Nephew of John Marshall, James Markham Marshall, and Alexander Keith Marshall.
    - Alexander Keith McClung (1809–1855), U.S. Chargé d'affaires to Bolivia 1849–51. Nephew of John Marshall.
    - Charles Alexander Marshall, Kentucky State Representative 1840 1855 1859. Nephew of John Marshall, James Markham Marshall, and Alexander Keith Marshall.
    - Edward Colston Marshall (1821–1893), U.S. Representative from California 1851–53, candidate for U.S. Senate from California 1856, candidate for U.S. Representative from Kentucky 1874, Attorney General of California 1883–87. Nephew of John Marshall, James Markham Marshall, and Alexander Keith Marshall.
    - Jacquelin Burwell Harvie (1788–1856), Virginia State Senator. Son-in-law of John Marshall.
      - Humphrey Marshall (1812–1872), U.S. Representative from Kentucky 1849–52 1855–59, U.S. Minister to China 1852–54, Confederate States Representative from Kentucky 1864–65. Grandson of Humphrey Marshall.
      - John Augustine Marshall (1854–1941), Utah Territory Representative, U.S. District Court Judge in Utah 1896. Grandson of James Markham Marshall.
        - John J. McAfee (1836–1896), Kentucky State Representative 1871–73. Son-in-law of Humphrey Marshall.
    - George C. Marshall (1880-1959) Chief of Staff of the United States Army (1939-1945), U.S. Secretary of State (1947-1949), U.S. Secretary of Defence (1950-1951), first cousin, three times removed, of former chief justice John Marshall.

NOTE: Robert Morris was also father of U.S. Representative Thomas Morris. John Marshall was also third cousin once removed of U.S. President Thomas Jefferson, brother-in-law of U.S. Court of Appeals Judges William McClung, George Keith Taylor, and U.S. Attorney Joseph Hamilton Daveiss; and cousin of U.S. Senator John Randolph. Thomas Marshall was also second cousin of Virginia State Senator William Marshall Ambler. Edward Colston was also son-in-law of Virginia House Delegate William Brockenbrough and brother-in-law of U.S. Senator Benjamin Watkins Leigh. Humphrey Marshall was also nephew of Kentucky and Alabama Legislator James G. Birney.

== The Marshalls of Maryland and Virginia ==
- Thurgood Marshall (1908–1993), Judge of the United States Court of Appeals for the Second Circuit 1961–65, Solicitor General of the United States 1965–67, Associate Justice of the Supreme Court of the United States 1967–91.
  - Thurgood Marshall Jr. (born 1956), White House Cabinet Secretary 1997–2001, Member of the Board of Governors of the United States Postal Service 2006–2018. Son of Thurgood Marshall.
  - John W. Marshall (born 1958), Director of the United States Marshals Service 1999–2001, Virginia Secretary of Public Safety 2002–10. Son of Thurgood Marshall.

== The Martinezes and Perezes of California ==
- Anthony Martinez (1938–2019), City Council member and mayor of Delano, California 1994–2001; candidate for reelection to Delano City Council 2002, 2004; candidate for Delano Joint Union High School District Board of Directors 2008; president, South San Joaquin Valley Division, League of California Cities; member, board of directors, Delano Mosquito Abatement District. Husband of Patricia Martinez.
- Patricia (Quon/Perez) Martinez (born 1942), member of the Kern County Human Relations Commission 1997–2001; member of the Delano Joint Union High School District Board of Directors 2000–04. Wife of Anthony Martinez.
  - Edmund Charles Gil (born 1963), supervising deputy district attorney of Tulare County, California, 1999–2006; senior deputy district attorney of Madera County, California, 2007–2013. Nephew of Patricia and Anthony Martinez.

Note: Patricia Martinez, Anthony Martinez and Edmund Gil are maternal cousins of Richard A. Walker.

== The Marvins ==
- Charles A. Marvin, district attorney of Bossier and Webster parishes, Louisiana, 1971–75; judge of the Louisiana Second Circuit Court of Appeal in Shreveport 1975–99, father of Schuyler Marvin

== The Mathiases ==
- Charles M. Mathias, delegate to the Republican National Convention 1924. Father of Charles Mathias.
  - Charles M. Mathias Jr. (1922–2010), Maryland House Delegate 1959–61, U.S. Representative from Maryland 1961–69, U.S. Senator from Maryland 1969–87, delegate to the Republican National Convention 1972. Son of Charles M. Mathias.

== The Martins of Alabama ==
- Joshua L. Martin (1799–1856), Alabama State Representative 1822–28, Solicitor of Alabama 1827–31, Circuit Court Judge 1834, U.S. Representative from Alabama 1835–39, Governor of Alabama 1845–47. Father of John Mason Martin.
  - John Mason Martin (1837–1898), Alabama State Senator 1871–76, U.S. Representative from Alabama 1885–87. Son of Joshua L. Martin.

== The Martins of Colorado and Oklahoma ==
- John Andrew Martin (1868–1939), Colorado State Representative 1901, U.S. Representative from Colorado 1909–13 1933–39. Brother of Hugh Martin Jr..
- Hugh Martin Jr., Sheriff of Woods County, Oklahoma. Brother of John Andrew Martin.

== The Martins of Kentucky and Virginia ==
- John Preston Martin (1811–1862), Kentucky State Representative 1841–43, U.S. Representative from Kentucky 1845–47, Kentucky State Senator 1855–59, delegate to the Democratic National Convention 1856. Brother of Elbert S. Martin.
- Elbert S. Martin (1829–1876), U.S. Representative from Virginia 1859–61. Brother of John Preston Martin.
  - George Brown Martin (1876–1945), Kentucky State Court Judge, U.S. Senator from Kentucky 1918–19, delegate to the Democratic National Convention 1928. Grandson of John Preston Martin.

== The Martins of West Virginia ==
- Dale Martin (1951–2011), West Virginia state delegate.
- Helen Martin, West Virginia state delegate. Wife of Dale Martin.

== The Martins and Owenses ==
- James B. Owens (1816–1889), delegate to the Democratic National Convention 1860, Confederate States Provisional Congress Delegate from Florida 1861–62. Grandfather of John W. Martin.
  - John W. Martin (1884–1958), Mayor of Jacksonville, Florida 1917–23; Governor of Florida 1925–29; delegate to the Democratic National Convention 1948. Grandson of James B. Owens.

NOTE: James B. Owens was also brother-in-law of U.S. Representative Ethelbert Barksdale.

== The Martins and Tillmans ==
- Barclay Martin (1802–1890), Tennessee State Representative 1839–40 1847–49 1851–53, Tennessee State Senator 1841–43, U.S. Representative from Tennessee 1845–47. Uncle of Lewis Tillman.
  - Lewis Tillman (1816–1886), Clerk of the Bedford County, Tennessee Circuit Court 1852–60; Clerk and Master of the Chancery Court in Tennessee 1865–69; U.S. Representative from Tennessee 1869–71. Nephew of Barclay Martin.

== The Martindales ==
- Henry C. Martindale (1780–1860); Surrogate of Washington County, New York 1816–19; District Attorney of Washington County, New York 1821–28; U.S. Representative from New York 1823–31 1833–35. Father of John H. Martindale.
  - John H. Martindale (1815–1881), Governor of Washington, D.C. 1862–64, Attorney General of New York 1866–67. Son of Henry C. Martindale.

== The Masons and Hucks ==
- William E. Mason (1850–1921), U.S. Representative from Illinois 1887–91 1917–21, U. S. Senator from Illinois 1897–1903.
  - Winnifred Sprague Mason Huck (1882–1936), U.S. Representative from Illinois 1922–23. Daughter of William E. Mason.

== The Masons of Virginia ==
- George Mason (1725–1792), member of the Virginia Legislature 1759 1776–80 1786–88, delegate to the U.S. Constitutional Convention 1787 1788. Brother of Thomson Mason.
- Thomson Mason (1730–1785), Chief Justice of the Virginia Supreme Court. Brother of George Mason.
  - Stevens Thomson Mason (1760–1803), member of the Virginia Legislature, U.S. Senator from Virginia 1794–1803. Son of Thomson Mason.
  - John Thomson Mason (1765–1824), Attorney General of Maryland 1806. Son of Thomson Mason.
    - Thomson F. Mason (1785–1838), Mayor of Alexandria, District of Columbia 1827–30. Grandson of George Mason.
    - Armistead T. Mason (1787–1819), U.S. Senator from Virginia 1816–17. Son of Stevens Thomson Mason.
    - John T. Mason (1787–1850), Secretary of Michigan Territory 1830–31. Son of Stevens Thomson Mason.
    - James M. Mason (1798–1871), Virginia House Delegate 1826, delegate to the Virginia Constitutional Convention 1829, U.S. Representative from Virginia 1837–39, U.S. Senator from Virginia 1847–61, Delegate to the Confederate States Provisional Congress from Virginia 1861, Confederate States Envoy to England 1861. Grandson of George Mason.
    - John Thomson Mason Jr. (1815–1873), Maryland House Delegate 1838–39, U.S. Representative from Maryland 1841–43, Judge of the Maryland Court of Appeals 1851–57, U.S. Collector of Customs of Baltimore, Maryland 1857–61; Maryland Secretary of State 1872–73. Son of John Thomson Mason.
      - Stevens T. Mason (1811–1843), Secretary of Michigan Territory 1831, Governor of Michigan Territory 1834–35, Governor of Michigan 1835–40. Son of John T. Mason.
        - C. O'Conor Goolrick, Virginia House Delegate 1908, Virginia State Senator 1915 1923, delegate to the Democratic National Convention 1924. Great-great-great-grandson of George Mason.

NOTE: Armistead T. Mason and John T. Mason were also brothers-in-law of U.S. Representative Benjamin Howard and U.S. Postmaster General William T. Barry.

== The Mathesons ==
- Scott Milne Matheson Sr. (1897–1958), U.S. Attorney of Utah 1949–53. Father of Scott M. Matheson.
  - Scott M. Matheson (1929–1990), Governor of Utah 1977–85. Son of Scott M. Matheson.
    - Scott Matheson Jr. (born 1953), U.S. Attorney of Utah 1993–97, candidate for Governor of Utah 2004, Judge of the United States Court of Appeals for the Tenth Circuit 2010–present. Son of Scott Matheson.
    - James D. Matheson (born 1960), U.S. Representative from Utah 2001–2015, delegate to the Democratic National Convention 2004. Son of Scott M. Matheson.

== The Mathews ==
- David Mathews (c. 1739 – 1800) Mayor of New York City 1776–83
- Vincent Mathews (1766–1844), nephew of David Mathews. Member of the New York State Assembly Tioga County 1794 and 1795, Member of the New York State Senate from 1796 to 1803, and elected as a Federalist to the 11th United States Congress, holding office from 4 March 1809 to 3 March 1811.
- Fletcher Mathews Haight (1799–1866), Jacksonian Assemblyman to the 57th New York State Legislature in 1834, and a Federal Judge nominated by President Abraham Lincoln on the United States District Court for the Southern District of California 1861–66.
- Henry Huntly Haight, son of Fletcher Mathews Haight, was the tenth governor of California 1867–71.
- Ellsworth Bunker (1894–1984), a descendant of Fletcher Mathews (brother of David Mathews), United States Ambassador to Argentina 1951, United States Ambassador to Italy 1952, United States Ambassador to India 1956, U.S. Ambassador to the Organization of American States 1964–66, and United States Ambassador to South Vietnam 1967–73.

== The Matsuis ==
- Bob Matsui (1941–2005), U.S. Representative from California 1979–2005.
- Doris Matsui (born 1944), U.S. Representative from California 2005–present. Wife of Bob Matsui.

== The Matthews and Wattersons ==
- Thomas Stanley Matthews (1824–1889), Hamilton County, Ohio Court of Common Pleas Judge 1850–52; Ohio State Senator 1856–57; U.S. Attorney in Ohio 1858–61; candidate for U.S. Representative from Ohio 1876; U.S. Senator from Ohio 1877–79; Justice of the U.S. Supreme Court 1881–89. Uncle of Henry Watterson.
  - Henry Watterson (1840–1921), U.S. Representative from Kentucky 1876–77. Nephew of Thomas Stanley Matthews.

NOTE: Thomas Stanley Matthews was also father-in-law of U.S. Supreme Court Justice Horace Gray. Henry Watterson was also son of U.S. Representative Harvey Magee Watterson.

== The Matthews and Whitcombs ==
- James Whitcomb (1795–1852), Indiana State Senator 1830–36, Governor of Indiana 1843–48, U.S. Senator from Indiana 1849–52. Father-in-law of Claude Matthews.
  - Claude Matthews (1845–1898), Indiana State Representative 1876, Indiana Secretary of State 1891–93, Governor of Indiana 1893–97. Son-in-law of James Whitcomb.

== The Mathias ==
- Charles M. Mathias, delegate to the Republican National Convention 1924. Father of Charles Mathias.
  - Charles Mathias (1922–2010), Maryland House Delegate 1959–61, U.S. Representative from Maryland 1961–69, U.S. Senator from Maryland 1969–87, delegate to the Republican National Convention 1972. Son of Charles M. Mathias.

== The Maxeys ==
- Rice Maxey (1800–1878), Texas State Senator 1861–62. Father of Samuel B. Maxey.
  - Samuel B. Maxey (1825–1895), Texas State Senator, candidate for U.S. Representative from Texas 1872, U.S. Senator from Texas 1875–87. Son of Rice Maxey.

== The Maxwells and Robesons ==
- George C. Maxwell (1771–1816), U.S. Representative from New Jersey 1811–13. Father of John Patterson Bryan Maxwell.
  - John Patterson Bryan Maxwell (1804–1845), U.S. Representative from New Jersey 1837–39 1841–43. Son of George C. Maxwell.
    - George M. Robeson (1829–1897), Attorney General of New Jersey 1867–69, U.S. Secretary of the Navy 1869–77, U.S. Representative from New Jersey 1879–83. Nephew of John Patterson Bryan Maxwell.

== The Maybanks ==
- Burnet R. Maybank (1899–1954), Mayor of Charleston, South Carolina 1931–38; delegate to the Democratic National Convention 1936 1940 1944; Governor of South Carolina 1939–41; U.S. Senator from South Carolina 1941–54. Father of Burnett R. Maybank II.
  - Burnet R. Maybank II (1924–2016), South Carolina State Representative 1953–58, Lieutenant Governor of South Carolina 1959–61. Son of Burnet R. Maybank.

== The Mayberrys ==
- Andy Mayberry (born 1970), Republican member of the Arkansas House of Representatives for District 27 in Pulaski and Saline counties 2011–15, lost primary election in 2014 for Lieutenant Governor of Arkansas, husband of Julie Mayberry
- Julie Mayberry (born c. 1971), Republican member of the Arkansas House of Representatives for District 27; succeeded her husband, Andy Mayberry

== The McAllisters ==
- Matthew McAllister (1758–1823), United States Attorney for the Southern District of Georgia 1789–1797; Mayor of Savannah, Georgia from 1798–1799 and 1814–1815.
  - Matthew Hall McAllister (1800–1865), member of the Georgia State Senate 1834–1837; Judge of the United States Circuit Court for the Districts of California 1855–1863. Son of Matthew McAllister.
    - Ward McAllister (1827–1895), socialite. Son of Matthew Hall McAllister.
      - Ward McAllister Jr. (1855–1908), Judge of the United States Territorial Court for the District of Alaska. Son of Ward McAllister.

== The McBrides ==
- James McBride (1802–1875), Oregon Territory Councilman, U.S. Ambassador to the Kingdom of Hawaii 1863–66. Father of John R. McBride, Thomas A. McBride, and George W. McBride.
  - John R. McBride (1832–1904), delegate to the Oregon Constitutional Convention 1857, Oregon State Senator 1860–62, U.S. Representative from Oregon 1863–65, Chief Justice of the Idaho Territory, Republican National Committeeman 1880–92. Son of James McBride.
  - Thomas A. McBride (1847–1930), Clatsop County, Oregon Circuit Court Judge 1892–1909; Justice of the Oregon Supreme Court 1909–30; Chief Justice of the Oregon Supreme Court 1913–15 1917–21 1923–27. Son of James McBride.
  - George W. McBride (1854–1911), Oregon State Representative 1882, Oregon Secretary of State 1886 1895, U.S. Representative from Oregon 1895–1901. Son of James McBride.

== The McBrides and Sinks ==
- Bill McBride, (1945–2012), 2002 Florida Democratic gubernatorial candidate defeated by Jeb Bush, husband of Alex Sink
- Alex Sink, McBride's wife and widow, 2010 Florida Democratic gubernatorial candidate for governor defeated by Rick Scott, 2014 Democratic candidate in Florida's 13th congressional district special election

== The McCains ==
- John McCain (1936-2018), U.S. Representative from Arizona, 1983-1987; U.S. Senator from Arizona, 1987-2018; 2008 Republican Party nominee for President of the United States.
- Carol McCain (born 1938), Director of the White House Visitors Office, 1981-1987. First wife of John McCain, divorced 1980.
- Cindy McCain (born 1954), 12th U.S. Ambassador to the United Nations Agencies for Food and Agriculture, 2021-2023; Executive Director of the World Food Programme, 2023–present. Second wife and widow of John McCain.

NOTE: John McCain was the son of former U.S. Navy Admiral and Commander of the United States Pacific Command, John S. McCain Jr., and the socialite and oil heiress Roberta McCain. He was the paternal grandson of former U.S. Navy Admiral John S. McCain Sr., who served as Chief of the Bureau of Aeronautics and Deputy Chief of Naval Operations for Air. John McCain was also the father of television personality, author, and columnist Meghan McCain, whom he parented with his second wife Cindy.

== The McCartys ==
- Enoch McCarty (1783–1857), delegate to the Indiana Constitutional Convention 1816, Indiana State Senator 1832–34, candidate for U.S. Representative from Indiana 1833, Indiana State Representative 1835–37, Judge in Indiana 1838–45. Brother of Benjamin McCarty, Johnathan McCarty, and Abner McCarty.
- Benjamin McCarty (1792–1865), Probate Court Judge in Indiana 1832–34, Indiana State Representative 1836–37. Brother of Enoch McCarty, Johnathan McCarty, and Abner McCarty.
- Johnathan McCarty (1795–1852), Indiana State Representative 1818, Clerk of Fayette County, Indiana 1819–27; U.S. Representative from Indiana 1831–37. Brother of Enoch McCarty, Benjamin McCarty, and Abner McCarty.
- Abner McCarty, Indiana State Representative 1838–39. Brother of Enoch McCarty, Benjamin McCarty, and Johnathan McCarty.
  - William Monroe McCarty, Indiana State Senator 1847–49, Circuit Court Judge in Indiana 1850–53. Son of Enoch McCarty.

== The McCaskills ==
- William Y. McCaskill, Insurance Commissioner of Missouri. Husband of Betty Anne McCaskill.
- Betty Anne McCaskill, Columbia, Missouri Councilwoman. Wife of William Y. McCaskill.
  - Claire McCaskill (born 1953), Missouri State Representative 1983–89, Prosecuting Attorney of Jackson County, Missouri 1992–98; Auditor of Missouri 1998–2006; delegate to the Democratic National Convention 2000, 2008; candidate for Governor of Missouri 2004; U.S. Senator from Missouri 2007–19. Daughter of William Y. McCaskill and Betty Anne McCaskill.

Claire (Clarence) Milton McCaskill, b. 1889, served as Mayor of Houston, Missouri. Father of William Y. McCaskill. William Jackson McCaskill, b. 1864, d. 1934, served as Sheriff of Texas County Missouri in 1916. Father of Claire Milton McCaskill

== The McClellans ==
- George B. McClellan (1826–1885), candidate for President of the United States 1864, Governor of New Jersey 1878–81. Father of George Brinton McClellan Jr.
  - George B. McClellan Jr. (1865–1940), U.S. Representative from New York 1895–1903, Mayor of New York City 1904–09. Son of George B. McClellan.

== The McClungs ==
- William McClung (1758–1811), Kentucky State Representative 1793, U.S. Attorney of Kentucky 1794–96, Kentucky State Senator 1796–1800, Judge of the U.S. Court of Appeals 1801. Father of Alexander Keith McClung.
  - Alexander Keith McClung (1809–1855), U.S. Chargé d'affaires to Bolivia 1849–51. Son of William McClung.

NOTE: William McClung was also brother-in-law of U.S. Secretary of State John Marshall.

== The McCooks ==
- George Wythe McCook (1821–1877), Attorney General of Ohio 1854–56, delegate to the Republican National Convention 1860. Brother of Edward Stanton McCook.
- Edwin Stanton McCook (1837–1873), Secretary of the Dakota Territory 1872–73. Brother of George Wythe McCook.
- Edward M. McCook (1833–1909), Kansas Territory Representative 1859, U.S. Minister to the Kingdom of Hawaii 1866–68, Governor of Colorado Territory 1869–73 1874–75, Republican National Committeeman. First cousin of George Wythe McCook and Edwin Stanton McCook.
- Anson George McCook (1835–1917), U.S. Representative from New York 1877–83. First cousin of George Wythe McCook and Edwin Stanton McCook.

NOTE: Edward M. McCook was also brother-in-law of U.S. Minister Charles Adams.

== The McCormacks ==
- John William McCormack (1891–1980), delegate to the Massachusetts Constitutional Convention 1917 1918, Massachusetts State Representative 1920–22, Massachusetts State Senator 1923–26, U.S. Representative from Massachusetts 1928–71, Speaker of the U.S. House of Representative 1963–71, delegate to the Democratic National Convention 1932 1940 1944 1948 1952 1956 1960 1964, Chairman of the Democratic National Convention 1964. Uncle of Edward McCormack Jr.
  - Edward McCormack Jr. (1923–1997), Attorney General of Massachusetts 1958–63, delegate to the Democratic National Convention 1960 1964, candidate for the Democratic nomination for U.S. Senate from Massachusetts 1962, candidate for Governor of Massachusetts 1966. Nephew of John William McCormack.

== The McCormicks ==
See McCormick family

== The McCrees ==
- Wade H. McCree (1920–1987), Judge of the United States District Court for the Eastern District of Michigan 1961–66, Judge of the United States Court of Appeals for the Sixth Circuit 1966–77, Solicitor General of the United States 1977–81.
  - Kathleen McCree Lewis (1947–2007), nominee to the United States Court of Appeals for the Sixth Circuit. Daughter of Wade H. McCree.

== The McCreerys ==
- William B. McCreery (1836–1896), Mayor of Flint, Michigan 1865–67; Treasurer of Michigan 1875–78; U.S. Consul in Valparaíso, Chile 1890. Father of Fenton R. McCreery.
  - Fenton R. McCreery (1866–1940), U.S. Minister to Santo Domingo 1907–09, U.S. Consul General in Santo Domingo, Dominican Republic 1907–09; U.S. Minister to Honduras 1909–11. Son of William B. McCreery.

== The McDills ==
- Thomas McDill (1815–1889), Sheriff of Portage County, Wisconsin Territory; Sheriff of Portage County, Wisconsin; County Judge of Portage County; County Treasurer of Portage County; Chairman of the Board of Supervisors of Portage County; Wisconsin State Assemblyman; Chairman of the Town Board of Plover, Portage County, Wisconsin. Brother of Alexander S. McDill.
- Alexander S. McDill (1822–1875), Wisconsin State Assemblyman 1862, Wisconsin State Senator 1863–64, U.S. Representative from Wisconsin 1873–75. Brother of Thomas McDill.
  - George Edward McDill (1856–1905), Chairman of the Town Board of Plover (town), Wisconsin; Chairman of the Board of Supervisors of Portage County, Wisconsin; Republican County Committeeman of Portage County, Wisconsin; Republican State Central Committeeman of Wisconsin. Son of Thomas McDill.

== The McDowells ==
- Joseph McDowell Jr. (1756–1801), U.S. Representative from North Carolina 1797–99. Cousin of Joseph McDowell.
- Joseph McDowell (1758–1799), U.S. Representative from North Carolina 1793–95. Cousin of Joseph McDowell Jr.
  - Joseph J. McDowell (1800–1877), Ohio State Representative 1832, Ohio State Senator 1833, candidate for U.S. Representative from Ohio 1840, U.S. Representative from Ohio 1843–47. Son of Joseph McDowell Jr.

== The McDuffies and Hamptons ==
- George McDuffie (1790–1851), South Carolina State Representative 1818–19, U.S. Representative from South Carolina 1821–34, Governor of South Carolina 1834–36, U.S. Senator from South Carolina 1842–46. Father-in-law of Wade Hampton III.
  - Wade Hampton III (1818–1902), South Carolina State Senator 1858, candidate for Governor of South Carolina 1865, Governor of South Carolina 1876–79, U.S. Senator from South Carolina 1879–91. Son-in-law of George McDuffie.

NOTE: Wade Hampton III was also grandson of U.S. Representative Wade Hampton I, son-in-law of U.S. Representative Francis Preston, and brother-in-law of U.S. Senator William Campbell Preston.

== The McEnerys ==
- John McEnery (1833–1891), Governor of Louisiana 1873. Brother of Samuel D. McEnery.
- Samuel D. McEnery (1837–1910), Lieutenant Governor of Louisiana 1879, Governor of Louisiana 1881–88, Justice of the Louisiana Supreme Court 1888–97, U.S. Senator from Louisiana 1897–1910. Brother of John McEnery.

== The McGuires and Nevilles ==
- William Neville (1843–1909), Illinois State Representative 1872, candidate for U.S. Representative from Nebraska 1884, Judge in Nebraska 1891–95, U.S. Representative from Nebraska 1899–1903, Arizona State Representative 1905. Cousin of Bird Segle McGuire.
- Bird Segle McGuire (1865–1930), Prosecuting Attorney of Chautauqua County, Kansas 1890–94; U.S. Congressional Delegate from Oklahoma Territory 1903–07; U.S. Representative from Oklahoma 1907–15. Cousin of William Neville.

== The McHenrys ==
- John H. McHenry (1797–1871), Commonwealth Attorney in Kentucky, Kentucky State Representative 1840, candidate for U.S. Representative from Kentucky 1840, U.S. Representative from Kentucky 1845–47, delegate to the Kentucky Constitutional Convention 1849, Kentucky Circuit Court Judge. Father of Henry D. McHenry.
  - Henry D. McHenry (1826–1890), Kentucky State Representative 1851–53 1865–67, U.S. Representative from Kentucky 1871–73, Democratic National Committeeman 1872–90. Son of John H. McHenry.

== The McKays ==
- K. Gunn McKay (1925–2000), U.S. Representative from Utah 1971–81. Brother of Monroe G. McKay.
- Monroe G. McKay (1928–2020), Judge of the U.S. Court of Appeals 1977–91, Chief Judge of the U.S. Court of Appeals 1991–93. Brother of K. Gunn McKay.

== The McKeans ==
- Samuel McKean (1787–1841), Pennsylvania State Representative 1815–19, U.S. Representative from Pennsylvania 1823–29, U.S. Senator from Pennsylvania 1833–39. Uncle of James McKean.
  - James McKean (1821–1879), Judge of Saratoga County, New York 1854–58; U.S. Representative from New York 1859–63; Justice of the Utah Territory 1870–75. Nephew of Samuel McKean.

== The McKeithens ==
- John McKeithen (1918–1999), Louisiana State Representative 1949–52, candidate for Democratic nomination for Lieutenant Governor of Louisiana 1952, Governor of Louisiana 1964–72, candidate for U.S. Senate from Louisiana 1972. Father of W. Fox McKeithen.
  - W. Fox McKeithen (1946–2005), Louisiana State Representative 1983–87, Louisiana Secretary of State 1987–2005, delegate to the Republican National Convention 2004. Son of John McKeithen.
    - Marjorie McKeithen (born 1965), candidate for U.S. Representative from Louisiana 1998. Daughter of W. Fox McKeithen.

== The McKennans ==
- Thomas McKean Thompson McKennan (1794–1852), U.S. Representative from Pennsylvania 1831–39 1842–43, U.S. Secretary of the Interior 1850. Father of William McKennon.
  - William McKennon (1816–1893), Judge of the U.S. Court of Appeals 1869–91. Son of Thomas McKean Thompson McKennan.

== The McKenzies and Moss ==
- James A. McKenzie (1840–1904), Kentucky State Representative 1867–71, U.S. Representative from Kentucky 1877–83, Kentucky State Representative 1884–88, U.S. Minister to Peru 1893–97. Uncle of J. McKenzie Moss.
  - J. McKenzie Moss (1868–1929), U.S. Representative from Kentucky 1902–03, Judge in Kentucky 1909–21, Judge of Kentucky Court of Claims 1826–1929. Nephew of James A. McKenzie.

== The McKims ==
- Alexander McKim (1748–1832), Maryland House Delegate 1778, Maryland State Senator 1806–10, U.S. Representative from Maryland 1809–15, Justice in Maryland. Uncle of Isaac McKim.
  - Isaac McKim (1775–1835), Maryland State Senator 1821–23, U.S. Representative from Maryland 1823–25 1833–35. Nephew of Alexander McKim.

== The McKinleys ==
- David Allison McKinley (1829–1892), U.S. Consul to the Kingdom of Hawaii. Brother of William McKinley.
- William McKinley (1843–1901), U.S. Representative from Ohio 1877–91, delegate to the Republican National Convention 1884 1888, Governor of Ohio 1892–96, President of the United States 1897–1901. Brother of David Allison McKinley.

NOTE: William McKinley was also cousin of U.S. Ambassador Henry P. Fletcher.

== The McKinneys ==
- James E. McKinney, Georgia State Representative. Father of Cynthia McKinney.
  - Cynthia McKinney (born 1955), Georgia State Representative 1989–93, U.S. Representative from Georgia 1993–2003 2005–07, candidate for President of the United States 2008. Daughter of James E. McKinney.

== The McKinneys of Connecticut ==
- Stewart B. McKinney (1931–1987), Connecticut State Senator 1967–71, U.S. Representative from Connecticut 1971–87, delegate to the Republican National Convention 1972. Father of John P. McKinney.
  - John P. McKinney (born 1964), Connecticut State Senator 1999–2015. Son of Stewart B. McKinney.

== The McKinnons ==
- Clinton D. McKinnon (1906–2001), U.S. Representative from California 1949–53, candidate for Democratic nomination for U.S. Senate from California 1952, delegate to the Democratic National Convention 1952 1956. Father of Mike McKinnon and Clinton D. McKinnon.
  - Mike McKinnon, Texas State Senator 1972–76. Son of Clinton D. McKinnon.
  - Clinton D. McKinnon, candidate for U.S. Representative from California. Son of Clinton D. McKinnon.

== The McLanes ==
- Louis McLane (1786–1837), U.S. Representative from Delaware 1917–27, U.S. Senator from Delaware 1927–29, U.S. Secretary of the Treasury 1831–33, U.S. Secretary of State 1833–34. Father of Robert M. McLane.
  - Robert M. McLane (1815–1898), Maryland House Delegate 1845–47, U.S. Representative from Maryland 1847–51 1879–83, Commissioner to China 1853–54, Envoy Extraordinary and Minister Plenipotentiary to Mexico 1859–60, Governor of Maryland 1884–85, Minister Plenipotentiary to France 1885–89. Son of Louis McLane.
    - Robert M. McLane (1867–1904), Mayor of Baltimore, Maryland 1903–04. Nephew of Robert M. McLane.

== The McLeans ==
- John McLean (1785–1861), U.S. Representative from Ohio 1813–16, Justice of the Ohio Supreme Court 1816–22, Commissioner of the United States General Land Office 1822–23, U.S. Postmaster General 1823–29, Justice of the U.S. Supreme Court 1830–61. Brother of William McLean and Finis McLean.
- William McLean (1794–1839), U.S. Representative from Ohio 1823–29. Brother of John McLean and Finis McLean.
- Finis McLean (1806–1881), Kentucky State Representative 1837, U.S. Representative from Kentucky 1849–51. Brother of John McLean and William McLean.
  - James D. Walker (1830–1906), Solicitor General of Arkansas, Presidential Elector 1876, U.S. Senator from Arkansas 1879–85. Nephew of John McLean, William McLean, and Finis McLean.

NOTE: James D. Walker was also grandson of U.S. Representative David Walker, grandnephew of U.S. Senator George Walker, and cousin of U.S. Senator Wilkinson Call. John McLean's son-in-law Joseph Pannell Taylor was the brother of President Zachary Taylor.

== The McMahons and Vallandighams ==
- Clement Vallandigham (1820–1871), Ohio State Representative 1845–46, U.S. Representative from Ohio 1858–63. Uncle of John A. McMahon.
  - John A. McMahon (1833–1923), U.S. Representative from Ohio 1875–81. Nephew of Clement Vallandigham.

== The McMillans ==
- Thomas S. McMillan (1888–1939), South Carolina State Representative 1917–24, Speaker of the South Carolina House of Representatives 1923–24, U.S. Representative from South Carolina 1925–39.
- Clara G. McMillan (1894–1976), U.S. Representative from South Carolina 1939–41. Wife of Thomas S. McMillan.

== The McNarys ==
- John Hugh McNary (1867–1936), Deputy District Attorney of Third District of Oregon 1898–1904, District Attorney for Third District of Oregon 1905–12, Judge for U.S. District Court of Oregon 1927–36. Brother of Charles L. McNary.
- Charles L. McNary (1874–1944), Marion County, Oregon Deputy Recorder 1892–96, Deputy District Attorney for Third District of Oregon 1904–11, Justice of the Oregon Supreme Court 1913–15, U.S. Senator from Oregon 1917–18 1919–44. Brother of John Hugh McNary.

== The McNichols ==
- William H. McNichols, Auditor of Denver, Colorado. Father of William H. McNichols Jr. and Stephen McNichols.
  - William H. McNichols Jr. (1910–1997), Mayor of Denver, Colorado 1968–83. Son of William H. McNichols.
  - Stephen McNichols (1914–1997), Colorado State Senator 1945–55, Lieutenant Governor of Colorado 1955–57, Governor of Colorado 1957–63, delegate to the Democratic National Convention 1960 1964, Democratic National Committeeman 1963, candidate for U.S. Senate from Colorado 1968. Son of William H. McNichols.

== The McNichols of Idaho and Washington ==
- Raymond Clyne McNichols (1914–1985), Judge of the United States District Court for the District of Idaho 1964–81.
- Robert James McNichols (1922–1992), Judge of the United States District Court for the Eastern District of Washington 1979–91. Brother of Raymond Clyne McNichols.

== The McNinches ==
- Samuel McNinch (1867–1929), Mayor of Charlotte, North Carolina 1905–07. Brother of Frank R. McNinch.
- Frank R. McNinch, member of the North Carolina legislature, Mayor of Charlotte, North Carolina 1917–20. Brother of Samuel McNinch.

== The McRaes ==
- Colin John McRae (1812–1877), member of the Mississippi Legislature 1838, Delegate to the Confederate States Provisional Congress from Alabama 1861–62. Brother of John Jones McRae.
- John Jones McRae (1815–1868), Mississippi State Representative 1848–50, U.S. Senator from Mississippi 1851–52, Governor of Mississippi 1854–57, U.S. Representative from Mississippi 1858–61, Confederate States Representative from Mississippi 1862–64. Brother of Colin John McRae.

== The McWherters ==
- Ned McWherter (1930–2011), Tennessee State Representative 1969–87, Governor of Tennessee 1987–95.
  - Mike McWherter (born 1955), candidate for Governor of Tennessee 2010. Son of Ned McWherter.

== The Mechems ==
- Merritt C. Mechem (1870–1946), New Mexico Territory Councilman 1909, District Court Judge in New Mexico 1911–20, Governor of New Mexico 1921–23. Uncle of Edward L. Mechem.
  - Edwin L. Mechem (1912–2002), New Mexico State Representative 1947–48, Governor of New Mexico 1951–55 1957–59 1961–62, delegate to the Republican National Convention 1952, U.S. Senator from New Mexico 1962–64, U.S. District Court Judge in New Mexico 1970. Nephew of Merritt C. Mechem.

== The Meeks ==
- Carrie P. Meek (1926–2021), U.S. Representative from Florida 1993–2003. Mother of Kendrick Meek.
  - Kendrick Meek (born 1966), U.S. Representative from Florida 2003–11. Son of Carrie P. Meek.
  - Leslie Meek (born 1965), Administrative Law Judge in Washington, D.C. is married to U.S. Rep. Kendrick Meek.

== The Mellons, Bruces, and Warners ==
See Mellon family.

- Thomas Mellon (1813–1908), Common Pleas Court Judge in Allegheny County, Pennsylvania 1859–69; Pittsburgh, Pennsylvania Councilman 1877–86. Father of Andrew W. Mellon.
  - Andrew W. Mellon (1855–1937), U.S. Secretary of the Treasury 1921–32, U.S. Ambassador to the United Kingdom 1932–33. Son of Thomas Mellon.
    - David K.E. Bruce (1898–1977), Maryland House Delegate 1924–26, U.S. Vice Consul in Rome, Italy 1926; Virginia House Delegate 1939–42; delegate to the Democratic National Convention 1940; U.S. Ambassador to France 1949–52; U.S. Ambassador to Germany 1957–59; U.S. Ambassador to Great Britain 1961–69; U.S. Liaison to China 1973–74. Son-in-law of Andrew W. Mellon.
      - John Warner (1927–2021), U.S. Secretary of the Navy 1972–74, U.S. Senator from Virginia 1979–2009. Former grandson-in-law of Andrew W. Mellon.

NOTE: David K.E. Bruce was also son of U.S. Senator William Cabell Bruce and brother of U.S. Ambassador James Bruce.

== The Menendezes ==
- Bob Menendez (born 1954), member of the Union City, NJ Board of Education, 1974-1978; Mayor of Union City, NJ, 1986-1992; member of the New Jersey General Assembly, 1987-1991; member of the New Jersey State Senate, 1991-1993; U.S. Representative from New Jersey, 1993-2006; U.S. Senator from New Jersey, 2006-2024.
  - Rob Menendez (born 1985), Commissioner of the Port Authority of New York and New Jersey, 2021-2022; U.S. Representative from New Jersey, 2023–present.

== The Mercers and Garnetts ==
- George Mason (1725–1792), delegate to the Virginia Convention 1776. Cousin of James Mercer and John Francis Mercer.
- James Mercer (1736–1793), member of the Virginia House of Burgesses 1765, Virginia Assemblyman 1774, Delegate to the Continental Congress from Virginia 1779, Judge in Virginia. Cousin of George Mason.
- John Francis Mercer (1759–1821), U.S. Representative from Maryland 1792–94, Governor of Maryland 1801–03. Cousin of George Mason.
  - Charles F. Mercer (1778–1858), Virginia House Delegate 1810–17, U.S. Representative from Virginia 1817–39. Son of James Mercer.
  - James M. Garnett (1770–1843), Virginia House Delegate 1800–01 1824–25, U.S. Representative from Virginia 1805–09, delegate to the Constitutional Convention 1829. Nephew of James Mercer and John Francis Mercer.
  - Robert S. Garnett (1789–1840), Virginia House Delegate 1816–17, U.S. Representative from Virginia 1817–27. Nephew of James Mercer and John Francis Mercer.
  - Robert Mercer Taliaferro Hunter (1809–1887), Virginia House Delegate 1835–37, U.S. Representative from Virginia 1837–43 1845–47, Speaker of the U.S. House of Representative 1839–41, U.S. Senator from Virginia 1847–61, candidate for Democratic nomination for President of the United States 1860, Confederate States Representative from Virginia 1861–62, Confederate States Secretary of State 1861–62, Confederate States Senator from Virginia 1862–65, Treasurer of Virginia 1874–80. Nephew of James Mercer and John Francis Hunter.
    - Muscoe Russell Hunter Garnett (1821–1864), delegate to the Virginia Constitutional Convention 1850 1851 1861, delegate to the Democratic National Convention 1952 1856, Virginia House Delegate 1853–56, U.S. Representative from Virginia 1856–61, Confederate States Representative from Virginia 1862–64. Grandson of James M. Garnett.

== The Merediths and Morrises ==
- Lewis Morris (1671–1746), Chief Justice of the New York Supreme Court 1715–33, governor of New Jersey 1738–46
  - Lewis Morris Jr. (1698–1762)
    - Lewis Morris (1726–1798), member of the New York Provincial Congress 1775–7; Delegate to the Continental Congress 1775–7; signer of the Declaration of Independence, New York State Senator 1777–81, 1783–90.
      - Richard Valentine Morris (1768–1815), member of the New York State Assembly 1813–4.
    - Staats Long Morris (1728–1800), MP for Elgin Burghs 1774–84.
    - Richard Morris (1730–1810), member of the New York State Senate 1778–9; Chief Justice of the New York Supreme Court 1779–90.
      - Lewis Richard Morris (1760–1825), member of the Vermont House of Representatives 1795–7, 1803–8; member of the U.S. House of Representatives 1797–1803.
    - Gouvernor Morris (1752–1816), member of the New York Provincial Congress 1777, Delegate to the Continental Congress 1787, Assistant Superintendent of Finance of Philadelphia, Pennsylvania 1781–85; Delegate to the Continental Congress from Pennsylvania 1787; U.S. Minister Plenipotentiary to France 1792–94; U.S. Senator from New York 1800–03. Granduncle of William M. Meredith.
      - William M. Meredith (1799–1873), Pennsylvania Assemblyman 1824–28, U.S. Secretary of the Treasury 1849–50, Attorney General of Pennsylvania 1861–67. Grandnephew of Gouverneur Morris.
  - Robert Hunter Morris (1700–1764), the governor of Pennsylvania 1754–6; Chief Justice of the New Jersey Supreme Court 1739–64.
    - Robert Morris (1745–1815), Chief Justice of the Supreme Court of New Jersey 1777–9; Judge of the United States District Court for the Eastern District of New Jersey 1801–2, Judge of the United States District Court for the District of New Jersey 1790–1801, 1802–15.

== The Meriwethers ==
- David Meriwether (1755–1822), Georgia State Representative 1797–1800, U.S. Representative from Georgia 1802–07. Father of James Meriwether.
  - James Meriwether (1789–1854), Georgia State Representative 1821–23, U.S. Representative from Georgia 1825–27. Son of David Meriwether.
  - David Meriwether (1800–1893), member of the Kentucky Legislature 1832, candidate for U.S. Representative from Kentucky 1847 1851, delegate to the Kentucky Constitutional Convention 1849, Kentucky Secretary of State 1851–52, U.S. Senator from Kentucky 1852, Governor of New Mexico Territory 1853–57, Kentucky State Representative 1858–85. Nephew of David Meriwether.
    - James Archibald Meriwether (1806–1852), Georgia State Representative 1831–36 1838, Superior Court Judge in Georgia 1845–49, U.S. Representative from Georgia 1841–43. Nephew of James Meriwether.

NOTE: David Meriwether was also cousin by marriage of U.S. President Franklin Pierce.

== The Merricks ==
- William Duhurst Merrick (1793–1857), Maryland House Delegate 1832–38 1856–57, U.S. Senator from Maryland 1838–45, delegate to the Maryland Constitutional Convention 1850. Father of William Matthew Merrick.
  - William Matthews Merrick (1818–1889), Justice of the District of Columbia Circuit Court 1854–63, delegate to the Maryland Constitutional Convention 1867, Maryland House Delegate 1870, U.S. Representative from Maryland 1871–73, Justice of the District of Columbia Supreme Court 1885–89. Son of William Duhurst Merrick.

== The Merrimons and Overmans ==
- Augustus Summerfield Merrimon (1830–1892), member of the North Carolina House of Commons 1860–61, Solicitor in North Carolina 1861–65, North Carolina Superior Court Judge 1866–67, candidate for Governor of North Carolina 1872, U.S. Senator from North Carolina 1873–79, Justice of the North Carolina Supreme Court 1883–89, Chief Justice of the North Carolina Supreme Court 1889–92. Father-in-law of Lee Slater Overman.
  - Lee Slater Overman (1854–1930), U.S. Senator from North Carolina 1903–30. Son-in-law of Augustus Summerfield Merrimon.

== The Merritts ==
- Edwin A. Merritt (1828–1916), New York Assemblyman 1860–61, delegate to the New York Constitutional Convention 1867 1868, candidate for Treasurer of New York 1875, U.S. Collector of Customs of New York City 1878–81, U.S. Consul General in London, England 1882–85. Father of Edwin A. Merritt.
  - Edwin A. Merritt (1860–1914), New York Assemblyman 1902–12, delegate to the Republican National Convention 1912, U.S. Representative from New York 1912–14. Son of Edwin A. Merritt.

== The Metcalfes ==
- Richard Lee Metcalfe (1861–1954), candidate for U.S. Senate from Nebraska 1928, Mayor of Omaha, Nebraska 1930–33; delegate to the Democratic National Convention 1932. Father of Theodore W. Metcalfe.
  - Theodore W. Metcalfe (1894–1973), Lieutenant Governor of Nebraska 1931–33, candidate for U.S. Representative from Nebraska 1940, delegate to the Republican National Convention 1952 1960. Son of Richard L. Metcalfe.

== The Metzenbaums and Hyatts ==
- James Metzenbaum (1883–1960), prominent Cleveland, Ohio, lawyer and candidate for the Ohio Supreme Court
  - Howard Metzenbaum (1917–2008), Ohio State Representative 1943–47, Ohio State Senator 1947–51, U.S. senator from Ohio, 1974 and 1977–95; cousin of James.
    - Joel Hyatt (b. 1950), Democratic nominee for U.S. senator from Ohio, 1994; son-in-law of Howard Metzenbaum.

== The Meyers ==
- Jan Meyers (born 1928), U.S. Representative from Kansas 1985–97. Mother of Phil Meyers.
  - Phil Meyers, candidate for U.S. Representative from Hawaii 2000. Son of Jan Meyers.

== The Meyners and Stevensons ==
- William Stevenson (1900–1985), U.S. Ambassador to the Philippines 1961–64. Father of Helen Stevenson Meyner.
  - Helen Stevenson Meyner (1928–1997), candidate for U.S. Representative from New Jersey 1972, U.S. Representative from New Jersey 1975–79, delegate to the Democratic National Convention 1980. Daughter of William Stevenson.
  - Robert B. Meyner (1908–1990), New Jersey State Senator 1948–51, Governor of New Jersey 1954–62, delegate to the Democratic National Convention 1956. Husband of Helen Stevenson Meyner.

NOTE: Helen Stevenson Meyner was also distant cousin of Illinois Governor Adlai Stevenson II.

== The Micas ==
- John Mica (born 1943), Florida State Representative, U.S. Representative from Florida 1993–2017. Brother of Daniel A. Mica.
- Daniel A. Mica (born 1944), U.S. Representative from Florida 1979–89. Brother of John Mica.

== The Mickelsons ==
- George T. Mickelson (1903–1965), South Dakota State Representative 1937–41, Attorney General of South Dakota 1943–47, Governor of South Dakota 1947–51, U.S. District Court Judge in South Dakota 1953–65. Father of George S. Mickelson.
  - George S. Mickelson (1941–1993), Governor of South Dakota 1987–93. Son of George T. Mickelson.
    - Mark Mickelson (born 1966), South Dakota State Representative 2013–2019. Son of George S. Mickelson.

== The Middletons, Rutledges, and Pickneys ==
See Middleton-Rutledge-Pinckney Family

== The Millards ==
- Ezra Millard (1833–1886), Mayor of Omaha, Nebraska 1869–71. Brother of Joseph Millard.
- Joseph Millard (1836–1922), Mayor of Omaha, Nebraska 1872–73; U.S. Senator from Nebraska 1901–07. Brother of Ezra Millard.

== The Millers ==
- George Miller Jr. (1917–1968), California State Senator, delegate to the Democratic National Convention 1952 1956 1960 1964. Father of George Miller III.
  - George Miller III (born 1945), U.S. Representative from California 1975–2015. Son of George Miller Jr. Patricia l. Miller {Senator}

== The Millers of California and Delaware ==
- Charles R. Miller (1857–1927), Delaware State Senator 1911–12, Governor of Delaware 1913–17. Father of Thomas W. Miller.
  - Thomas W. Miller (1886–1973), Delaware Secretary of State 1913–15, U.S. Representative from Delaware 1915–17. Son of Charles R. Miller.
    - Clement Woodnutt Miller (1916–1962), candidate for U.S. Representative from California 1956, U.S. Representative from California 1959–62. Grandson of Charles R. Miller.

== The Millers of California, Indiana, and Washington ==
- John Franklin Miller (1831–1886), Indiana State Senator 1860, U.S. Senator from California 1881–86. Uncle of John Franklin Miller.
  - John Franklin Miller (1862–1936), Mayor of Seattle, Washington 1908–10; U.S. Representative from Washington 1917–32. Nephew of John Franklin Miller.

== The Millers of Georgia ==
- Stephen Grady Miller (1891–1932), Georgia State Senator 1926–28. Father of Zell Miller.
  - Zell Miller (1932–2018), Mayor of Young Harris, Georgia 1959–61; Georgia State Senator 1961–65; delegate to the Democratic National Convention 1972 2000; Lieutenant Governor of Georgia 1975–81; Governor of Georgia 1991–99; U.S. Senator from Georgia 2000–05. Son of Stephen Grady Miller.

== The Millers of Kentucky ==
- Shackelford Miller, Chief Justice of the Kentucky Court of Appeals. Father of Shackelford Miller Jr. and Neville Miller.
  - Shackelford Miller Jr. (1892–1965), U.S. District Court Judge in Kentucky 1939–45, Judge of the U.S Court of Appeals 1945–65. Son of Shackelford Miller.
  - Neville Miller (1894–1977), Mayor of Louisville, Kentucky 1933–37; delegate to the Democratic National Convention 1936. Son of Shackelford Miller.

== The Millers of Louisiana ==
- Ralph R. Miller (1934–2017), member of the Louisiana House of Representatives from 1968–80 and 1982–92; a lawyer and lobbyist from Norco in St. Charles Parish; father of Gregory A. Miller, a Democrat officeholder later turned Republican.
  - Gregory A. Miller (born 1962), member of the Louisiana House of Representatives since 2012, a Republican lawyer from Destrehan, Louisiana, son of Ralph R. Miller

== The Millers of New York ==
- Morris S. Miller (1779–1824), President of Utica, New York 1808; Judge of Court of Common Pleas of Oneida County, New York 1810–24; U.S. Representative from New York 1813–15. Father of Rutger B. Miller.
  - Rutger B. Miller (1805–1877), Utica, New York Alderman; New York Assemblyman 1832; Clerk of U.S. District Court 1832–33; U.S. Representative from New York 1836–37. Son of Morris S. Miller.

== The Millers of New York (II) ==
- William E. Miller (1914–1983), U.S. Representative from New York 1951–65, Chairman of the Republican National Committee 1961–64, candidate for Vice President of the United States 1964. Father of William E. Miller Jr.
  - William E. Miller Jr., candidate for U.S. Representative from New York 1992 1994. Son of William E. Miller.

== The Millers of Pennsylvania ==
- Jesse Miller (1800–1850), Sheriff of Perry County, Pennsylvania 1823–26; Pennsylvania State Representative 1826–28; Pennsylvania State Senator 1828–32; U.S. Representative from Pennsylvania 1833–36; Pennsylvania Secretary of State 1845–48. Father of William Henry Miller.
  - William Henry Miller (1829–1870), Clerk of the Pennsylvania Supreme Court 1854–63, U.S. Representative from Pennsylvania 1863–65, delegate to the Democratic National Convention 1864. Son of Jesse Miller.

== The Millikens ==
- James W. Milliken, Michigan State Senator 1898–1900. Father of James T. Milliken.
  - James T. Milliken (1882–1952), Mayor of Traverse City, Michigan; candidate for Republican nomination for Michigan State Senate 1926 1932; Michigan State Senator 1941–50. Son of James W. Milliken.
    - William G. Milliken (1922–2019), Michigan State Senator 1961–64, Lieutenant Governor of Michigan 1965–69, Governor of Michigan 1969–82, delegate to the Republican National Convention 1972. Son of James T. Milliken.

== The Mills family ==
- Peter Mills (born 1943), Maine State Senator 1996–2010, candidate for the Republican nomination for Governor of Maine 2006 2010. Brother of Janet Mills.
- Janet Mills (born 1947), District Attorney of Androscoggin County, Franklin County and Oxford County, Maine; candidate for the Democratic nomination for U.S. Representative from Maine 1994; Maine State Representative 2002–2009; Attorney General of Maine 2009–2011 2013–2019; Vice Chair of the Maine Democratic Party 2011–2012; Governor of Maine 2019–present. Sister of Peter Mills.

== The Mills and Dean family ==
- Zebediah Mills (1743–1790), member of New York State Assembly representing Westchester County 1777–80, 1781–84.
  - Andrew J. Mills (1821–1881), member of New York State Assembly from Orange County, New York 1854, 1856.
    - Howard Mills III (born 1964), member of New York State Assembly from Orange County, New York 1998–2004.
      - Howard Dean (born 1948), collateral descendant of Zebediah Mills through common ancestor. 79th governor of Vermont 1991–2003. Candidate for the Democratic nomination in the 2004 United States presidential election. Chairman of the Democratic National Committee 2005–09.

== The Miltons and Atkinsons ==
- John Milton (1740–1817), Georgia Secretary of State 1777–99. Father of John Milton.
  - John Milton (1807–1865), delegate to the Democratic National Convention 1860, Governor of Florida 1861–65. Son of John Milton.
    - William Hall Milton (1864–1942), candidate for Governor of Florida 1900 1912, member of the Florida Legislature, U.S. Senator from Florida 1908–09. Son of John Milton.
      - William Yates Atkinson (1854–1899), Georgia State Representative 1886–94, Georgia Democratic Party Chairman 1890–92, Governor of Georgia 1894–98. Grandson-in-law of John Milton.
        - William Y. Atkinson Jr. (1887–1953), Georgia Democratic Chairman 1942, Justice of the Georgia Supreme Court 1943–48. Son of William Yates Atkinson.

== The Mitchells of Wisconsin ==
- Alexander Mitchell (1817–1887), U.S. Representative from Wisconsin 1871–75. Father of John L. Mitchell.
  - John L. Mitchell (1842–1904), U.S. Representative from Wisconsin 1891–93, U.S. Senator from Wisconsin 1893–99. Son of Alexander Mitchell.

== The Mitchells of Arizona ==
- W.W. Mitchell, member of the Arizona Legislature. Grandfather of Harry Mitchell and Robert Mitchell.
  - Harry Mitchell (born 1940), Tempe, Arizona Councilman 1970–78; Mayor of Tempe, Arizona 1978–94; Arizona State Senator 1999–2007; Chairman of the Arizona Democratic Party; U.S. Representative from Arizona 2007–11. Grandson of Mitchell.
  - Robert Mitchell, Mayor of Casa Grande, Arizona 1993–2001; Casa Grande, Arizona Councilman 2001–04. Grandson of W.W. Mitchell.
    - Mark Mitchell, Tempe, Arizona Councilman 2000–12; Vice Mayor of Tempe, Arizona 2004–06; Mayor of Tempe, Arizona 2012–Present. Son of Harry Mitchell.

== The Mitchells of Maryland ==
- Parren Mitchell (1922–2007), U.S. Representative from Maryland 1971–87. Uncle of Clarence Mitchell III and Michael B. Mitchell.
  - Clarence Mitchell III (1939–2012), Baltimore, Maryland Councilman; Maryland House Delegate 1963–67; Maryland State Senator 1967–86. Nephew of Parren Mitchell.
  - Michael B. Mitchell (born 1945), Baltimore, Maryland Councilman; Maryland State Senator 1987. Nephew of Parren Mitchell.
    - Keiffer Mitchell (born 1967), Baltimore, Maryland Councilman 1995–2007; candidate for Democratic nomination for Mayor of Baltimore, Maryland 2007. Nephew of Clarence Mitchell III.
    - Clarence Mitchell IV, Maryland State Senator. Son of Clarence M. Mitchell, III.

== The Mitchells of Minnesota ==
- William B. Mitchell (1832–1900), Justice of the Minnesota Supreme Court 1881–99. Father of William D. Mitchell.
  - William D. Mitchell (1874–1955), Solicitor General of the United States 1925–29, Attorney General of the United States 1929–33. Son of William B. Mitchell.

== The Mitschers and Shears ==
- Thomas J. Shear (1836–1901), Clerk of Hillsboro (town), Wisconsin; Superintendent of Schools of Vernon County, Wisconsin; Wisconsin State Assemblyman. Father of Byron D. Shear.
  - Byron D. Shear (1869–1929), Mayor of Oklahoma City, Oklahoma 1918–19, delegate to the 1924 Republican National Convention. Son of Thomas J. Shear.
  - Oscar A. Mitscher (1861–1926), Mayor of Oklahoma City, Oklahoma 1892–94. Son-in-law of Thomas J. Shear.

== The Mizunos ==
- John Mizuno, Member of the Hawaii House of Representatives (2006–2024)
  - May Mizuno, Member of the Hawaii House of Representatives (2024–present). Wife of John Mizuno.

== The Moffats ==
- Seth Low (1850–1916), Mayor of Brooklyn, New York 1882–85; candidate for Mayor of New York City 1897; Mayor of New York City 1902–03; delegate to the Republican National Convention 1908; delegate to the New York Constitutional Convention 1915. Uncle of Seth Low Pierrepont and A. Augustus Low.
  - Seth Low Pierrepont (1884–1956), Connecticut State Representative 1921–27. Nephew of Seth Low.
  - A. Augustus Low (1889–1963), Chairman of the Hamilton County, New York Republican Party 1930–42; delegate to the New York Constitutional Convention 1938. Nephew of Seth Low.
    - Jay Pierrepont Moffat (1896–1943), U.S. Consul in Sydney 1935–37; U.S. Minister to Canada 1940–43. Nephew of Seth Low Pierrepont.
    - Abbot Low Moffat (1901–1996), New York Assemblyman 1929–43. Nephew of Seth Low Pierrepont.
      - Jay P. Moffat (born 1932), U.S. Ambassador to Chad 1985–87. Son of Jay Pierrepont Moffat.
      - William Tapley Bennett Jr. (1917–1994), U.S. Ambassador to the Dominican Republic 1964–66, U.S. Ambassador to Portugal 1966–69. Nephew by marriage of Jay Pierrepont Moffat and Abram Low Moffat.

NOTE: Seth Low was also son-in-law of U.S. Supreme Court Justice Benjamin R. Curtis. Jay Pierrepont Moffat was also son-in-law of U.S. Ambassador Joseph Grew. Moffat and Abbot Low Moffat were also brother-in-law of U.S. Ambassador John Campbell White.

== The Molinaris ==
- S. Robert Molinari (1897–1957), New York Assemblyman 1943–44. Father of Guy Molinari.
  - Guy Molinari (1928–2018), New York Assemblyman 1974–80, delegate to the New York Republican Convention 1979, delegate to the Republican National Convention 1980 1984, U.S. Representative from New York 1981–89, President of Staten Island 1990–2001, candidate for District Attorney of Richmond County, New York 1995. Son of S. Robert Molinari.
    - Susan Molinari (born 1958), New York City Councilwoman 1986–90, U.S. Representative from New York 1990–97. Daughter of Guy Molinari.
    - L. William Paxon (born 1954), member of the Erie County, New York Legislature 1878–1982; New York Assemblyman 1983–89; U.S. Representative from New York 1989–99. Husband of Susan Molinari.

== The Mollohans ==
- Robert H. Mollohan (1909–1999), U.S. Marshal in West Virginia 1950, U.S. Representative from West Virginia 1953–57 1969–83. Father of Alan Mollohan.
  - Alan Mollohan (born 1943), U.S. Representative from West Virginia 1983–2011. Son of Robert H. Mollohan.

== The Mondales ==
- Walter Mondale (1928–2021), Attorney General of Minnesota 1960–64, delegate to the Democratic National Convention 1960 1964 1996 2000 2004 2008, U.S. Senator from Minnesota 1964–76, Vice President of the United States 1977–81, candidate for President of the United States, 1984, chairman of the National Democratic Institute for International Affairs 1986–93, U.S Ambassador to Japan 1993–96, candidate for U.S. Senator from Minnesota, 2002. Father of Theodore A. Mondale.
  - Theodore A. Mondale (born 1957), Minnesota State Senator 1991–96, candidate for Democratic nominations for Governor of Minnesota, 1998, member of the Metropolitan Council 1999–2003. Son of Walter Mondale.

== The Moneys and Vardamans ==
- Hernando Money (1839–1912), U.S. Representative from Mississippi 1875–85, U.S. Senator from Mississippi 1897–1911. Cousin of James K. Vardaman.
- James K. Vardaman (1861–1930), Mississippi State Representative 1890–96, candidate for Governor of Mississippi 1895 1899, Governor of Mississippi 1904–08, U.S. Senator from Mississippi 1913–19. Cousin of Hernando Money.

== The Monroes and Alsops ==
- Joseph Jones (1727–1805), delegate to the Virginia Constitutional Convention 1776, member of the Virginia Legislature 1776, Delegate to the Continental Congress from Virginia 1777, Virginia State Court Judge 1778. Uncle of James Monroe.
  - James Monroe (1758–1831), Governor of Virginia 1799 – 1802 1811, U.S. Secretary of War 1814–15, U.S. Secretary of State 1811–14 1815–17, President of the United States 1817–25. Nephew of Joseph Jones.
  - Thomas B. Monroe (1791–1865), Kentucky State Representative 1816, Kentucky Secretary of State 1823–24, U.S. District Court Judge in Kentucky 1834–61, Delegate to the Confederate States Provisional Congress from Kentucky 1861–62. Distant cousin of James Monroe.
    - James Monroe (1799–1870), U.S. Representative from New York 1839–41, New York Assemblyman 1850 1852. Nephew of James Monroe.
    - Samuel L. Gouverneur (1799–1867), member of the New York state legislature, Postmaster of New York City 1828–36. Nephew by marriage and son-in-law of James Monroe.
      - Samuel Laurence Gouverneur Jr., U.S. Consul to Foo Chow, China. Son of Samuel L. Gouverneur.
        - Theodore D. Robinson (1883–1934), New York Assemblyman 1912, New York State Senator 1922. Great-great-grandnephew of James Monroe.
        - Corinne Robinson Alsop (1886–1971), Connecticut State Representative 1925, delegate to the Republican National Convention 1936, member of the Connecticut Republican Committee 1940. Great-great-grandniece of James Monroe.
        - Joseph Wright Alsop IV (1876–1953), Connecticut State Representative 1907–09, Connecticut State Senator 1909–13, member of the Connecticut Republican Committee 1909–12. Husband of Corinne Robinson Alsop.
          - John deKoven Alsop (1915–2000), Connecticut State Representative 1947–49, delegate to the Republican National Convention 1952 1960 1972, candidate for Governor of Connecticut 1962. Son of Corinne Robinson Alsop and Joseph Wright Alsop IV.

Theodore D. Robinson and Corinne Robinson Alsop were also niece and nephew of U.S. President Theodore Roosevelt, first cousins of Puerto Rico Governor Theodore Roosevelt Jr., and first cousins by marriage of U.S. President Franklin D. Roosevelt and Speaker of the U.S. House of Representatives Nicholas Longworth.

== The Montgomerys ==
- John Montgomery (1722–1808), Pennsylvania State Representative 1782–83, Delegate the Continental Congress from Pennsylvania 1782–84, Cumberland County, Pennsylvania Judge 1794. Father of John Montgomery.
  - John Montgomery (1764–1828), Maryland House Delegate 1793–98 1800–05 1819, Maryland State Attorney 1793–96, U.S. Representative from Maryland 1807–11, Attorney General of Maryland 1811–18, Mayor of Baltimore, Maryland 1820–22 1824–26. Son of John Montgomery.

== The Moodys ==
- Blair Moody (1902–1954), U.S. Senator from Michigan 1951–52, delegate to the Democratic National Convention 1952, candidate for U.S. Senate from Michigan 1954, died during campaign. Father of Blair Moody Jr.
  - Blair Moody Jr. (1928–1982), Wayne County, Michigan Circuit Court Judge 1966–69; candidate for Justice of the Michigan Supreme Court 1974; Justice of the Michigan Supreme Court 1977–82. Son of Blair Moody.

== The Moodys of Oregon ==
- Zena Ferry Moody (1832–1917), Governor of Oregon 1882–87. Father of Malcolm Moody and Ralph E. Moody.
  - Malcolm Moody (1854–1925), The Dalles, Oregon Councilman; Mayor of The Dalles, Oregon; U.S. Representative from Oregon 1899–1903. Son of Zena Ferry Moody.
  - Ralph E. Moody, Oregon State Representative. Son of Zena Ferry Moody.

== The Mooneys and Suarezes ==
- Xavier Suarez (born 1949), Mayor of Miami, Florida, 1985–1993 1997–1998, candidate for Mayor of Miami-Dade County, Florida, 1996, candidate for Mayor of Miami, Florida, 2001; candidate for Commissioner of Miami-Dade County, Florida, 2004; candidate for Florida State Representative 2006; Commissioner of Miami-Dade County, Florida, 2011–2020. Father of Francis Suarez.
  - Francis Suarez (born 1977), Commissioner of Miami, Florida, 2009–2017; Mayor of Miami, Florida, 2017–present. Son of Xavier Suarez.
  - Alex Mooney (born 1971), Maryland State Senator 1999–2011, Chairman of the Maryland Republican Party 2010–2013, candidate for the 2014 Republican nomination for U.S. Representative from Maryland, U.S. Representative from West Virginia 2015–present. Nephew of Xavier Suarez.

== The Moores and Capitos ==
- Arch A. Moore Jr. (1923–2015), U.S. Representative from West Virginia 1957–69, Governor of West Virginia 1969–77 1985–89, candidate for U.S. Senate from West Virginia 1978. Father of Shelley Moore Capito.
  - Shelley Moore Capito (born 1953), U.S. Representative from West Virginia 2001–2015, US Senator from West Virginia 2015–present. Daughter of Arch A. Moore Jr.
    - Riley Moore (born 1980), Delegate representing the 67th District in the West Virginia House of Delegates, Treasurer of West Virginia, U.S. Representative from West Virginia 2025–present. Nephew of Shelley Moore Capito and grandson of Arch A. Moore Jr.
    - Moore Capito (born 1982), Delegate representing the 35th District in the West Virginia House of Delegates. Son of Shelley Moore Capito and grandson of Arch A. Moore Jr.

== The Moores of Alabama ==
- Gabriel Moore (1785–1845), Alabama Territory Representative 1817, delegate to the Alabama Constitutional Convention 1819, Alabama State Senator 1819–20, U.S. Representative from Alabama 1821–29, Governor of Alabama 1829–31, U.S. Senator from Alabama 1831–37. Brother of Samuel B. Moore.
- Samuel B. Moore (1789–1846), Alabama State Representative, Alabama State Senator, Governor of Alabama 1831, Judge of the Pickens County, Alabama Court 1835–41. Brother of Gabriel Moore.

== The Moores of North Carolina and South Carolina ==
- James Moore (c. 1650–1706), governor of Carolina from 1700 to 1703. Ancestor of Maurice Moore.
  - Maurice Moore, Judge in North Carolina. Descendant of James Moore.
    - Alfred Moore (1755–1810), North Carolina Assemblyman, Attorney General of North Carolina, Justice of the U.S. Supreme Court 1799–1804. Son of Maurice Moore.

== The Moores of Virginia ==
- Andrew Moore (1752–1821), Virginia House Delegate 1780–83 1785–88 1799–1800, U.S. Representative from Virginia 1789–97 1804, Virginia State Senator 1800–01, U.S. Senator from Virginia 1804–09, U.S. Marshal of Virginia 1810–21. Father of Samuel M. Moore.
  - Samuel M. Moore (1796–1875), member of the Virginia Legislature, U.S. Representative from Virginia 1833–35. Son of Andrew Moore.

== The Moores and Spinners ==
- Francis E. Spinner (1802–1890), U.S. Representative from New York 1855–61. Grandfather of T. Channing Moore.
  - T. Channing Moore, New York Assemblyman 1920–26 1929. Grandson of Francis E. Spinner.

== The Morans ==
- James P. Moran (born 1945), Alexandria, Virginia Councilman 1979–82; Vice Mayor of Alexandria, Virginia 1982–84; Mayor of Alexandria, Virginia 1985–90; U.S. Representative from Virginia 1991–2015. Brother of Brian Moran.
- Brian Moran (born 1959), Virginia House Delegate 1995–2008, delegate to the Democratic National Convention 2004, current candidate for 2009 Democratic nomination for Governor of Virginia. Brother of James P. Moran.

== The Morgenthaus ==
- Henry Morgenthau Sr. (1856–1946), Financial Chairman of the Democratic Party 1912 1916, U.S. Ambassador to the Ottoman Empire 1913–16. Father of Henry Morgenthau Jr.
  - Henry Morgenthau Jr. (1891–1967), Chair of the New York State Agricultural Advisory Committee 1929–33, Governor of the Federal Farm Board 1933–34, U.S. Secretary of the Treasury 1934–45. Son of Henry Morgenthau Sr.
    - Robert M. Morgenthau (1919–2019), U.S. Attorney for the Southern District of New York 1961–62 1962–69, candidate for Governor of New York 1962, Deputy Mayor of New York City 1969–70, candidate for the Democratic nomination for Governor of New York 1970, District Attorney for New York County, New York 1975–2009. Son of Henry Morgenthau Jr.

NOTE: Robert M. Morgenthau is also grandnephew of U.S. Senator Herbert H. Lehman and cousin of U.S. Ambassador John Langeloth Loeb.

== The Moreheads ==
- John Motley Morehead (1796–1866), member of the North Carolina House of Commons 1821 1826–27 1838, Governor of North Carolina 1841–45, Delegate to the Confederate States Provisional Congress from North Carolina 1861–62. Cousin of James T. Morehead.
- James T. Morehead (1797–1854), Kentucky State Representative 1828–31 1837–38, Lieutenant Governor of Kentucky 1832–34, Governor of Kentucky 1834–36, U.S. Senator from Kentucky 1841–47. Cousin of John Motley Morehead.
- Charles S. Morehead (1802–1868), Kentucky State Representative 1828, Attorney General of Kentucky 1832–38, U.S. Representative from Kentucky 1847–51, Governor of Kentucky 1855–59. First cousin of James T. Morehead.
  - William Waightstill Avery (1816–1864), member of the North Carolina Legislature 1842, delegate to the Democratic National Convention 1860, Delegate to the Confederate State Provisional Congress from North Carolina 1861–62. Son-in-law of John Motley Morehead.

== The Morials ==
- Ernest Nathan Morial (1929–1989), Louisiana State Representative 1968–70, Louisiana Juvenile Court Judge 1970–74, Judge of the Louisiana Court of Appeals 1974–78, Mayor of New Orleans, Louisiana 1978–86. Father of Marc Morial.
  - Marc Morial (born 1958), candidate for U.S. Representative from Louisiana 1990, Louisiana State Senator 1992–94, Mayor of New Orleans, Louisiana 1994–2002; delegate to the Democratic National Convention 2000. Son of Ernest Nathan Morial.

== The Morrells ==
- Arthur Anthony Morrell (born 1943), clerk of the New Orleans Criminal District Court since 2006; member of the Louisiana House of Representatives for District 97, 1984 to 2006, New Orleans lawyer, husband of Cynthia Hedge-Morrell, and father of Jean-Paul Morrell
- Cynthia Hedge-Morrell (born 1947), member of the New Orleans City Council for District D from 2005 to 2014, wife of Arthur A. Morrell and mother of Jean-Paul Morrell
  - Jean-Paul Morrell (born 1978), member of the Louisiana House for District 97 from 2006 to 2009; member of the Louisiana State Senate for District 3 since 2009; lawyer in New Orleans, son of Arthur A. Morrell and Cynthia Hedge-Morrell.

== The Moriartys, Minors, and Pellys ==
- Thomas T. Minor (1844–1889), delegate to the Republican National Convention 1880, Mayor of Port Townsend, Washington 1881; Mayor of Seattle, Washington 1887–88. Grandfather of Thomas M. Pelly.
  - Charles P. Moriarty, U.S. Attorney in Washington 1953–61. Father of Charles Moriarty Jr.
  - Thomas M. Pelly (1902–1973), U.S. Representative from Washington 1953–73. Father-in-law of Charles Moriarty Jr.
    - Charles Moriarty Jr. (1928–1999), Washington State Representative 1957–59, Washington State Senator 1959–66. Son of Charles P. Moriarty.

== The Morrills ==
- Anson P. Morrill (1803–1887), Postmaster of Kennebec County, Maine 1825–41; Maine State Representative 1833 1880; Sheriff of Somerset County, Maine 1839; candidate for Governor of Maine 1853; Governor of Maine 1855–61; delegate to the Republican National Convention 1856; U.S. Representative from Maine 1861–63. Brother of Lot M. Morrill.
- Lot M. Morrill (1813–1883), Maine State Senator 1854–56, Governor of Maine 1858–61, U.S. Senator from Maine 1861–76, U.S. Secretary of the Treasury 1876–77. Brother of Anson P. Morrill.

== The Morrises of Morrisania and New Jersey ==
- Lewis Morris (1671–1746), Chief Justice of New York Colony, acting Governor of New York, Governor of New Jersey Colony. Father of Robert Hunter Morris.
  - Robert Hunter Morris (1700–1764), Chief Justice of the New Jersey Colony Supreme Court, Deputy Governor of Pennsylvania Colony 1754–56. Son of Lewis Morris.
    - Robert Morris (1745–1815), Chief Justice of the Supreme Court of New Jersey 1777–79, Judge of the United States District Court for the District of New Jersey 1790–1801, Judge of the United States District Courts for the Eastern District of New Jersey and the Western District of New Jersey 1801–02, Judge of the United States District Court for the District of New Jersey 1802–15. Son of Robert Hunter Morris.
    - Lewis Morris (1726–1798), Delegate to the Continental Congress from New York 1775–77, Judge of Westchester County, New York 1777; New York State Senator 1777–81 1784–88; delegate to the New York Constitutional Convention 1788. Nephew of Robert Hunter Morris.
    - Gouverneur Morris (1752–1816), New York Colony Congressman 1775–77, member of the New York Council of Safety 1777, New York Assemblyman 1777–78, Delegate to the Continental Congress from New York 1778–79, U.S. Minister to France 1792–94, U.S. Senator from New York 1800–03. Nephew of Robert Hunter Morris.
    - William Paterson (1745–1806), New Jersey Colony Congressman 1775–76, member of the New Jersey Legislature 1776–77, Delegate to the Continental Congress from New Jersey 1776, Attorney General of New Jersey 1776–83, U.S. Senator from New Jersey 1789–90, Governor of New Jersey 1790–93, Justice of the U.S. Supreme Court 1793–1806. Cousin by marriage of Lewis Morris.
      - Stephen Van Rensselaer III (1764–1839), New York Assemblyman 1789–91, New York State Senator 1791–96, Lieutenant Governor of New York 1795–1801, candidate for Governor of New York 1813. Son-in-law of William Paterson.
      - Philip Schuyler Van Rensselaer (1767–1824), Mayor of Albany, New York 1799–1812. Brother of Stephen Van Rensselaer III.
      - Lewis R. Morris (1760–1825), Clerk of Windsor County, Vermont 1789–96; Judge in Windsor County, Vermont; Vermont State Representative 1790–91 1795–97 1803–08; U.S. Representative from Vermont 1797–1803. Nephew of Lewis Morris and Gouverneur Morris.
      - John Rutherfurd (1760–1840), New Jersey Assemblyman 1788–90, U.S. Senator from New Jersey 1791–98. Son-in-law of Lewis Morris.
        - William M. Meredith (1799–1873), Pennsylvania Assemblyman 1824–25, Philadelphia, Pennsylvania Councilman 1834–49; U.S. Attorney in Pennsylvania; U.S. Secretary of the Treasury 1849–50; Attorney General of Pennsylvania 1861–67. Grandnephew of Gouverneur Morris.
        - Henry Bell Van Rensselaer (1810–1864), U.S. Representative from New York 1841–43. Son of Stephen Van Rensselaer III.
          - Robert Walter Rutherfurd, member of the New Jersey Legislature. Son of John Rutherfurd.

NOTE: Gouverneur Morris was also a relative of U.S. Ambassador Wymberley DeRenne Coerr. John Rutherfurd was also of some relation to Northwest Territory Governor Arthur St. Clair.

== The Morrises of Illinois and Ohio ==
- Thomas Morris (1776–1844), Ohio State Representative 1806–07 1808–09 1810–11 1820–21, Ohio State Senator 1813–1915 1823–25 1825–29 1831–33, Justice of the Ohio Supreme Court 1809–10, U.S. Senator from Ohio 1833–39, candidate for Vice President of the United States 1838. Father of Jonathan D. Morris and Isaac N. Morris.
  - Jonathan D. Morris (1804–1879), Clerk of Clermont County, Ohio; U.S. Representative from Ohio 1847–51. Son of Thomas Morris.
  - Isaac N. Morris (1812–1879), Illinois State Representative 1846–48, U.S. Representative from Illinois 1857–61. Son of Thomas Morris.

== The Morrises of Pennsylvania and New York ==
- Robert Morris (1734–1806), member of the Pennsylvania Colony Council of Safety 1775, Pennsylvania Colony Assemblyman 1775–76, member of the Pennsylvania Legislature 1776–78, Delegate to the Continental Congress from Pennsylvania 1775–78, delegate to the Pennsylvania Constitutional Convention 1787, U.S. Senator from Pennsylvania 1789–95. Father of Thomas Morris.
  - Thomas Morris (1771–1849), New York State Senator 1794–96, U.S. Representative from New York 1801–03, U.S. Marshal of New York 1816 1820 1825 1829. Son of Robert Morris.

== The Morrises of Ohio ==
- Joseph Morris (1795–1854), Sheriff of Greene County, Ohio 1824; Treasurer of Monroe County, Ohio; Ohio State Representative 1833–34; U.S. Representative from Ohio 1843–47. Father of James R. Morris.
  - James R. Morris (1819–1899), Treasurer of Monroe County, Ohio; Ohio State Representative 1848; U.S. Representative from Ohio 1861–65; Probate Court Judge in Ohio 1872–77; Postmaster in Ohio 1886–89. Son of Joseph Morris.

== The Morrisons ==
- Frank B. Morrison (1905–2004), Chairman of the Frontier County, Nebraska Democratic Party 1940; delegate to the Democratic National Convention 1956; candidate for U.S. Representative from Nebraska 1948 1954; candidate for U.S. Senate from Nebraska 1958 1966 1970; Governor of Nebraska 1961–70. Father of Frank B. Morrison Jr.
  - Frank B. Morrison Jr., (1937–2006), Justice of the Montana Supreme Court 1981–87. Son of Frank B. Morrison.
    - John Morrison (born 1961), Auditor of Montana, candidate for Democratic nomination for U.S. Senate from Montana 2006. Son of Frank B. Morrison Jr.

== The Morrisons of Louisiana ==
- Jacob Haight Morrison, III (1875–1929), district attorney of Pointe Coupee Parish, Louisiana, half uncle of deLesseps Story Morrison and father of Jacob Haight Morrison, IV
  - Jacob Haight Morrison, IV (1905–1974), historical preservationist in New Orleans, half-brother of deLesseps Story Morrison
  - deLesseps Story "Chep" Morrison (1912–1964), member of the Louisiana House of Representatives 1940–46, mayor of New Orleans, 1946–61, U.S. Ambassador to the Organization of American States, 1961–63, candidate for governor of Louisiana in 1956, 1959, and 1963–64
    - deLesseps Story "Toni" Morrison (1944–1996), member of the Louisiana House of Representatives 1974–80, president of the Young Democrats of America 1973–75, son of deLesseps Story Morrison

== The Morrisons of North Carolina ==
- Cameron A. Morrison (1869–1953), 55th Governor of North Carolina 1921–1925, United States Senator from North Carolina 1930–1932, member of the U.S. House of Representatives 1943–1945
- Sara Virginia Ecker Watts Morrison (1868–1950), First Lady of North Carolina 1924–1925. Second wife of Cameron A. Morrison
  - Angelia Lawrance Morrison Harris (1912–1983), acting First Lady of North Carolina 1921–1924, daughter of Cameron A. Morrison

== The Morrows ==
- Jay Johnson Morrow (1870–1837), Governor of Zamboanga 1901–02, Governor of the Panama Canal Zone 1921–24. Brother of Dwight Morrow.
- Dwight Morrow (1873–1931), U.S. Ambassador to Mexico 1927–30, U.S. Senator from New Jersey 1930–31. Brother of Jay Johnson Morrow.

NOTE: Dwight Morrow's daughter, Anne, was also daughter-in-law of U.S. Representative Charles August Lindbergh.

== The Morrows of Mississippi ==
- James A. Morrow Sr. (1892–1967) Mississippi State Representative 1936–1944, father of James A. Morrow Jr., brother of Robert Morrow.
  - James A. Morrow Jr. (1923–1990), Mississippi State Representative 1952–1988, son of James A. Morrow Sr.
- Robert D. Morrow Sr. (1894–1985), Mississippi State Treasurer 1956–1960, brother of James A. Morrow Sr.

== The Mortons ==
- Thruston B. Morton (1907–1982), congressman and Senator from Kentucky, chairman of Republican National Committee 1959–61; brother of Rogers
- Rogers Morton (1914–1979), congressman from Maryland, chairman of RNC 1969–71, Secretary of Interior, Secretary of Commerce; brother of Thruston

NOTE: The Mortons were not related to Vice President Levi P. Morton.

== The Mortons of Florida and Virginia ==
- Jackson Morton (1794–1874), U.S. Senator from Florida 1849–55, Confederate States Representative from Florida 1861. Brother of Jeremiah Morton.
- Jeremiah Morton (1799–1978), U.S. Representative from Virginia 1849–51. Brother of Jackson Morton.

== The Mortons of Indiana ==
- Oliver P. Morton (1823–1877), Circuit Court Judge in Indiana 1852, candidate for Governor of Indiana 1856, Lieutenant Governor of Indiana 1861, Governor of Indiana 1861–67, U.S. Senator from Indiana 1867–77. Father of John M. Morton.
  - John M. Morton, U.S. Consul General in Honolulu, Kingdom of Hawaii 1880. Son of Oliver P. Morton.

NOTE: Oliver P. Morton was also brother-in-law of Dakota Territory Governor John A. Burbank. Burbank's son-in-law was Joseph Henry Kibbey, Territorial Governor of Arizona, whose father was John F. Kibbey, Indiana Attorney General in the administration of Governor Morton and also Morton's law partner in Richmond, Indiana.

== The Mortons of New York and Ohio ==
- Daniel O. Morton (1815–1859), Mayor of Toledo, Ohio 1849–50; U.S. Attorney of Ohio 1853–57. Brother of Levi P. Morton.
- Levi P. Morton (1824–1920), U.S. Representative from New York 1879–81, U.S. Minister to France 1881–85, Vice President of the United States 1889–93, Governor of New York 1895–97. Brother of Daniel O. Morton.

== The Mosbachers ==
- Robert Mosbacher (1927–2010), U.S. Secretary of Commerce 1989–92. Father of Robert Mosbacher Jr.
- Georgette Mosbacher (born 1947), United States Ambassador to Poland 2018–present. Ex-wife of Robert Mosbacher.
  - Robert Mosbacher Jr. (born 1951), candidate for Republican nomination for U.S. Senate from Texas 1984, delegate to the Republican National Convention 1988, candidate for Lieutenant Governor of Texas 1990, candidate for Mayor of Houston, Texas 1997. Son of Robert Mosbacher.

== The Moseleys of Virginia and the South ==
- William Moseley, Commissioner of Lower Norfolk Co. 1649–55, Virginia Colony
  - Arthur Moseley, elected to House of Burgesses, Virginia Colony. Son of William Moseley.
- Edward Moseley (1682–1749), Surveyor General of North Carolina 1710–49, first colonial Treasurer of North Carolina 1715–49. Speaker of the North Carolina House of Burgesses (the lower house of the legislature) for several terms.
  - William Dunn Moseley (1795–1863), territorial representative for several terms, first Governor of Florida. Descendant of Edward Moseley.

== The Moses ==
- Franklin Moses Sr. (1804–1877), Circuit Court Judge in South Carolina, Chief Justice of the South Carolina Supreme Court. Father of Franklin Moses Jr.
  - Franklin Moses Jr. (1838–1906), Republican National Committeeman, Governor of South Carolina 1872–74. Son of Franklin Moses Sr.

== The Motzes ==
- J. Frederick Motz (born 1942), United States Attorney for the District of Maryland 1981–85, Judge of the United States District Court for the District of Maryland 1985–2010.
- Diana Gribbon Motz (born 1943), Judge of the United States Court of Appeals for the Fourth Circuit 1994–present. Wife of J. Frederick Motz.

== The Mousers ==
- Grant E. Mouser (1868–1949), Prosecuting Attorney of Marion County, Ohio, 1893–96; U.S. Representative from Ohio 1905–09; delegate to the Republican National Convention 1908; Judge of the Court of Common Pleas in Marion County, Ohio, 1916–25. Father of Grant E. Mouser Jr.
  - Grant E. Mouser Jr. (1895–1943), Solicitor of Marion, Ohio, 1924–27; U.S. Representative from Ohio 1929–33. Son of Grant E. Mouser.

== The Moylans ==
Guamanian office-holders descended from Scotty Moylan (1916-2010), an Illinois-born businessman that lived in Guam:

- Douglas Moylan (born 1966), Attorney General of Guam, 2003–2007, 2023–present.
- Kaleo Moylan (born 1966), Lieutenant Governor of Guam, 2003–2007.
- Kurt Moylan (born 1939), Lieutenant Governor of Guam, 1971-1975; Secretary of Guam, 1969-1971.
- James Moylan (born 1962), United States Delegate to the U.S. House of Representatives, 2023–present.

== The Mudds ==
- Sydney Emanuel Mudd I (1858–1911), Maryland House Delegate 1879 1881 1895, U.S. Representative from Maryland 1890–91 1897–1911, delegate to the Republican National Convention 1896. Father of Sydney Emanuel Mudd II.
  - Sydney Emanuel Mudd II (1885–1924), candidate for Maryland House Delegate 1909, candidate for Republican nomination for U.S. Representative from Maryland 1912, U.S. Representative from Maryland 1915–24. Son of Sydney Emanuel Mudd II.

== The Mortons of Michigan and Nebraska ==
- J. Sterling Morton (1831–1902), Secretary of Nebraska Territory 1858–61, U.S. Secretary of Agriculture 1893–97. Father of Paul Morton.
  - Paul Morton (1857–1911), U.S. Secretary of the Navy 1904–05. Son of J. Sterling Morton.

== The Mrvans ==
- Frank Mrvan Jr. (born 1933) Member of the Indiana Senate 1978–1995, 1998–2022. Father of Frank J. Mrvan.
  - Frank J. Mrvan (born 1969) Township trustee for North Township, Indiana 2005–2021; Member of the U.S. House of Representatives from Indiana 2021–present. Son of Frank Mrvan Jr.

== The Muhlenbergs ==
- Henry Muhlenberg (1711–1787) Founder of the Lutheran Church in America
  - Peter Muhlenberg (1746–1807) Minister; Continental Army General; US Congressman; US Senator; son of Henry Muhlenberg
  - Frederick Muhlenberg (1750–1801) Member of Continental Congress; first Speaker of US House of Representatives; son of Henry Muhlenberg
    - Frederick Augustus Muhlenberg (1887–1980) US Congressman; World War I and World War II soldier, great-great-grandson of Peter
    - John Andrew Shulze (1774–1852) Governor of Pennsylvania, grandson of Henry
    - Henry A. P. Muhlenberg (1782–1844) US Congressman; Minister to Austria, grandson of Henry
      - Henry Augustus Muhlenberg (1823–1854) US Congressman, son of Henry A.P.
    - Francis Swaine Muhlenberg (1795–1831) US Congressman, son of Peter

NOTE: Henry Augustus Muhlenberg was also grandson of U.S. Representative Joseph Hiester.

== The Moylans ==
- Scotty Moylan (1916–2010), businessman and political fundraiser.
  - Kurt Moylan (born 1939), 1st Lieutenant Governor of Guam (1971–1975)
    - Kaleo Moylan (born 1966), 7th Lieutenant Governor of Guam (2003–2007)
    - Douglas Moylan (born 1966), 9th and 15th Attorney General of Guam (2003–2007, since 2023)
  - James Moylan (born 1962), Delegate to the U.S. House of Representatives from Guam's at-large district (since 2023)

== The Muensters ==
- Ted Muenster, political advisor.
- Karen Nelson Muenster (born 1942), Member of the Vermillion, South Dakota City Council; Member of the South Dakota Senate 1985–1992; Senate minority whip 1988–1992. Wife of Ted Muenster.
  - Mary Kathryn Muenster Pritzker (born 1967), First Lady of Illinois 2019–present. Daughter of Ted Muenster and Karen Nelson Muenster.
  - JB Pritzker (born 1965), Governor of Illinois 2019–present. Husband of Mark Kathryn Muenster Pritzker.

== The Muhlbauers ==
- Louis Muhlbauer (1929–1997), member of the Iowa House of Representatives 1982–1992. Father of Dan Muhlbauer.
  - Dan Muhlbauer (1958–2020), member of the Iowa House of Representatives 2011–2015. Son of Louis Muhlbauer. Father of Dave Muhlbauer.
    - Dave Muhlbauer (c. 1983), Crawford County Supervisor 2017–2021. Lieutenant Governor of Iowa 2027–present.

== The Mullins ==
- Joseph Mullin (1811–1882), U.S. Representative from New York 1847–49, Justice of the New York Supreme Court 1857–81. Father of Joseph Mullin.
  - Joseph Mullin (1848–1897), delegate to the Republican National Convention 1888, New York State Senator 1892–97. Son of Joseph Mullin.

== The Murguias ==
- Carlos Murguia (born 1957), Judge of the United States District Court for the District of Kansas 1999–2020.
- Mary H. Murguia (born 1960), Judge of the United States District Court for the District of Arizona 2000–11, Judge of the United States Court of Appeals for the Ninth Circuit 2011–present. Sister of Carlos Murguia.

== The Murkowskis ==
- Frank Murkowski (born 1933), Alaska Commissioner of Economic Development 1966–70, candidate for U.S. Representative from Alaska 1970, U.S. Senator from Alaska 1981–2002, Governor of Alaska 2002–06, candidate for Governor of Alaska 2006. Father of Lisa Murkowski and Eileen Van Wyhe.
  - Lisa Murkowski (born 1957), Alaska state representative 1999–2002, U.S. Senator from Alaska, 2002–, candidate for U.S. Senator from Alaska 2010. Daughter of Frank Murkowski. Sister of Eileen Van Wyhe.
  - Eileen Marie (Murkowski) Van Wyhe (born 1960), candidate for Alaska State Representative 2000. Daughter of Frank Murkowski. Sister of Lisa Murkowski.

== The Murphys ==
- John F. Murphy, candidate for Michigan State Senate 1902, candidate for U.S. Representative from Michigan 1914. Father of William F. Murphy.
  - William F. Murphy (1890–1949), candidate for U.S. Representative from Michigan 1920, Recorder's Court Judge in Michigan 1924–30, Mayor of Detroit, Michigan 1930–33; Governor of the Philippine Islands 1933–35; delegate to the Democratic National Convention 1936; Governor of Michigan 1937–38; Attorney General of the United States 1939–40; Justice of the U.S. Supreme Court 1940–49. Son of John F. Murphy.

== The Murrays ==
- William Murray (1803–1875), U.S. Representative from New York 1851–55. Brother of Ambrose S. Murray.
- Ambrose S. Murray (1807–1885), Treasurer of Orange County, New York 1851–54; U.S. Representative from New York 1855–59; delegate to the Republican National Convention 1856. Brother of William Murray.

== The Murrays of Montana ==
- James E. Murray (1876–1961), U.S. Senator from Montana 1934–61.
  - William Daniel Murray (1908–1994), Judge of the United States District Court for the District of Montana 1949–65. Son of James E. Murray.

== The Murrays of Oklahoma ==
- William H. Murray (1869–1956), candidate for Texas State Senate 1890, delegate to the Oklahoma Constitutional Convention 1906, Oklahoma State Representative 1907–09, delegate to the Democratic National Convention 1912, U.S. Representative from Oklahoma 1913–17, candidate for Democratic nomination for Governor of Oklahoma 1918 1938, Governor of Oklahoma 1931–35, candidate for Democratic nomination for President of the United States 1932, candidate for U.S. Representative from Oklahoma 1940, candidate for Democratic nomination for U.S. Senate from Oklahoma 1942. Brother of George T. Murray.
- George T. Murray, delegate to the Democratic National Convention 1932. Brother of William H. Murray.
  - Johnston Murray (1902–1974), Governor of Oklahoma 1951–55, delegate to the Democratic National Convention 1952. Son of William H. Murray.

== The Murrays of Pennsylvania ==
- John Murray (1768–1843), Pennsylvania State Representative 1807–10, U.S. Representative from Pennsylvania 1817–21. Cousin of Thomas Murray Jr.
- Thomas Murray Jr. (1770–1823), Pennsylvania State Representative 1813, U.S. Representative from Pennsylvania 1821–23. Cousin of John Murray.

== The Mutchlers ==
- William Mutchler (1831–1893), Sheriff of Northampton County, Pennsylvania 1854–60; Prothonotary of Northampton County, Pennsylvania 1861–67; Chairman of the Pennsylvania Democratic Committee 1869–70; delegate to the Democratic National Convention 1876 1880 1884 1888 1892; U.S. Representative from Pennsylvania 1875–77 1881–85 1889–93. Father of Howard Mutchler.
  - Howard Mutchler (1859–1916), U.S. Representative from Pennsylvania 1893–95 1901–03. Son of William Mutchler.

== The Myricks and Forests ==
- Sue Myrick (born 1941), 51st Mayor of Charlotte, North Carolina 1987–1991; U.S. Representative from North Carolina 1995–2013. Mother of Dan Forest.
  - Dan Forest (born 1967), 34th Lieutenant Governor of North Carolina 2013–2021; Republican nominee for Governor of North Carolina in the 2020 election. Son of Sue Myrick.
