= Marrow =

Marrow may refer to:

- Marrow (vegetable), the mature fruit of certain Cucurbita pepo cultivars
- Bone marrow, a semi-solid tissue in bones
  - Bone marrow (food)

== Arts and entertainment ==
=== Music ===
- Marrow (band), American rock band
- Marrow (album), by Madder Mortem, 2018, and its title track
- Marrow 1, an EP by I:Scintilla, 2012
  - Marrow 2, 2013
- "Marrow", a song by Ani DiFranco from the 2001 album Revelling/Reckoning
- "Marrow", a song by Anohni from the 2016 album Hopelessness
- "Marrow", a song by Meshuggah from the 2012 album Koloss
- "Marrow", a song by Yob from the 2014 album Clearing the Path to Ascend
- "Marrow", a song by St. Vincent from the 2009 album Actor
- Marrow, an album by Brakence, 2026
- The Marrow Song, a song by Edrich Siebert: see Marrow (vegetable)

=== Other uses in arts and entertainment ===
- Marrow (character), a character in the X-Men comic series
- Marrow (novel), by Robert Reed, 2000

== People ==
- Alex Marrow (born 1990), English footballer
- Alfred J. Marrow (1905–1978), American industrial psychologist and philanthropist
- Buck Marrow (1909–1982), American baseball player
- Christopher Marrow (born 1996), South African cricketer
- Claude Marrow (born 1978), American wrestler, ring name Ruckus
- Deborah Marrow (1948–2019), American arts administrator
- Henry Marrow Jr. (1947–1970), victim of the Shooting of Henry Marrow
- James Morrow (disambiguation)
- Joanne Marrow (1945–2014), American clinical psychologist, author and professor
- Jermaine Marrow (born 1997), American basketball player
- Mitch Marrow (born 1975), American football player
- Queen Esther Marrow (born 1941), American soul and gospel singer
- Vince Marrow (born 1968), American football player
- Ice-T (Tracy Marrow, born 1958), American rapper and actor

== Other uses ==
- Fort Marrow, a historic American Civil War fort in West Virginia, U.S.
- Marrow, the student branch of the Anthony Nolan charity

== See also ==
- Marrowbone (disambiguation)
- Joseph R. Marro (1907–1989), American lawyer and politician
- Marrow Controversy, a Scottish ecclesiastical dispute occasioned by the republication of The Marrow of Modern Divinity in 1718
