= Dying and Falling =

Dying & Falling

Studio album by I:Scintilla
- Released: November 26, 2010
- Genre: Industrial
- Length: 59:53 (Bonus CD 42:50)
- Label: Alfa Matrix

I:Scintilla chronology
Prey On You (2007)	Dying & Falling (2010)	Marrow 1 (2012)

Alternate cover
- The cover used on the limited edition release.

Professional ratings
Review scores
Source	Rating
COMA Music Magazine	(Favorable)

Dying & Falling is the third album of the Illinois-based industrial band, I:Scintilla. Like their previous album Optics, there were two versions released. One was a single-disc version, and the other was a limited-edition version with a bonus disc, titled Resuscitation, containing additional studio recordings as well as remixes.

The artwork was illustrated by singer Brittany Bindrim.

== Track listing ==
1. "Swimmers Can Drown" - 04:07
2. "Sharia Under a Beauty Curse" - 03:46
3. "Ammunition" - 04:54
4. "Worth the Wait" - 04:34
5. "Mothership" - 03:53
6. "Dying & Falling" - 04:54
7. "Face the Kill" - 04:31
8. "The Shake" - 04:09
9. "Prey On You" - 06:32
10. "Shattered" - 05:41
11. "Omen" - 04:11

== Resuscitation Track Listings ==
1. "Hollowed" - 03:29
2. "I Want It All" - 05:15
3. "The Shake [Volatile Night Version]" - 04:16
4. "Swimmers Can Drown [Iris Mix]" - 04:58
5. "I Want It All [Essence Of Mind Mix]" - 06:09
6. "Worth the Wait [Neurobash Mix]" - 03:35
7. "Hollowed [The Dreamside Mix]" - 05:23
8. "Swimmers Can Drown [Voicans Mix]" - 04:24
9. "Prey On You [DJ Ram Mix]" - 05:53
10. "Swimmers Can Drown [Freakangel Mix]" - 03:55
11. "Ammunition [Essence Of Mind Mix]" - 04:20
