= James Morrow (disambiguation) =

James K. Morrow (born 1947) is an American novelist and short-story writer.

James Morrow may also refer to:

- James Morrow (trade unionist) (1904–1986), Irish trade unionist and politician
- James Morrow (Manitoba politician) (1857–1949), politician in Manitoba, Canada
- James Morrow (dancer) (born 1976), American dancer and choreographer
- James A. Morrow (1941–2024), American mathematician
- James A. Morrow Sr. (1892–1967), American politician from Mississippi
- James A. Morrow Jr. (1923–1990), American politician from Mississippi and son of the above
- James D. Morrow (born 1957), professor of world politics
