= Prey On You =

EP by I:Scintilla
- Released: December 4, 2009
- Genre: Industrial
- Length: 40:55
- Label: Alfa Matrix

I:Scintilla chronology
Optics (2004)	Prey On You (2009)	Dying & Falling (2007)

Prey On You is the second EP of the Illinois-based industrial band, I:Scintilla. The album contains three new songs and five remixes. Two of the new songs, Prey On You and Ammunition, are also featured on their next full-length album, Dying and Falling. In addition, Hollowed is on the bonus disc of the limited edition release of Dying and Falling.

== Track listing ==
1. "Prey On You" - 06:30
2. "Ammunition" - 04:50
3. "Hollowed" - 03:31
4. "Prey On You (Sebastian Komor Mix)" - 05:57
5. "Prey On You (Hard Dance Mix by Studio-X)" - 05:37
6. "Prey On You (Cylab Mix)" - 05:01
7. "Ammunition (C/A/T Mix)" - 05:31
8. "Hollowed (Indigent Mix by Die Warzau)" - 03:58
