= Havestar =

EP by I:Scintilla
- Released: August 25, 2006
- Genre: Industrial
- Length: 38:25
- Label: Alfa Matrix

I:Scintilla chronology
The Approach (2004)	Havestar (2006)	Optics (2007)

Havestar is the first EP by the Illinois-based industrial band I:Scintilla. It was released in 2006 on Alfa Matrix. The album contains three reworked songs from their first release, The Approach. These songs are also featured on their next full-length album, Optics. In addition, there are six remixes by various well-known artists within the genre.

== Track listing ==
1. "Havestar" - 04:44
2. "Scin" - 04:35
3. "The Bells" - 04:32
4. "Capsella (Toxin Mix)" - 03:38
5. "Havestar (Combichrist Mix)" - 04:43
6. "Havestar (Diskonnekted Mix)" - 04:56
7. "Havestar (Implant Mix)" - 04:36
8. "Capsella (Klutae Mix)" - 06:41
