= Marrowbone =

Marrowbone may refer to the following:

== Places ==
- Marrowbone, Cumberland County, Kentucky, U.S.
- Marrowbone, Pike County, Kentucky, U.S.
- Marrowbone Township, Moultrie County, Illinois, U.S.
- Marrowbone Lane in Dublin, Ireland

== Other uses ==
- Marrowbone (film), a 2017 Spanish film

== See also ==
- Bone marrow
- Marrow (disambiguation)
- Marrow Bone Spring Archeological Site, in Vandergriff Park in Arlington, Texas, U.S.
