= I:Scintilla =

American post-industrial band

- I:Scintilla photoshoot 2009

Background information
- Origin: Chicago, Illinois, U.S.
- Genres: Industrial rock, electronic rock
- Years active: 2003–present
- Labels: Black Dove Music; Alfa Matrix
- Members: Jim Cookas; Brittany Bindrim; Vincent Grech; Dean Dunakin
- Past members: Chad Mines; Jason Allen; Bethany Whisenhunt; Justin Pogue; Brandon Chase; Brent Leitner; John Freriks; Myles Arwine
- Website: iscintilla.com

I:Scintilla is a post-industrial music band from Chicago, Illinois, currently consisting of guitarist Jim Cookas, vocalist Brittany Bindrim, drummer Vincent Grech and bassist Dean Dunakin.

To date, they have released four studio albums and four EPs.

== History ==
=== Early years and The Approach (2002–2004) ===
I:Scintilla was conceptualized in Champaign, IL by Jim Cookas in December 2002. In January 2003, Chad Mines joined the group as bassist, followed shortly by Jason Allen on guitar and programming in March. Upon formation, they immediately began writing their debut album, The Approach, while still searching for a vocalist. Many singers were auditioned before finding Brittany Bindrim, who they found to be a perfect fit. The album was finished and self-released on July 29, 2004; it contained early versions of many songs that would appear on later albums.

=== Alfa-Matrix and Havestar (2005–2006) ===
After a previously full year of nonstop live performances, I:Scintilla was discovered and signed by Belgian electro label Alfa-Matrix. In March 2005, Jason Allen left the band and Chad Mines moved to guitar. Bethany Whisenhunt was brought on to play bass. The band continued to work on the release of its first EP, Havestar, while providing material for a future full-length album.

The Havestar EP was released by Alfa-Matrix in the summer of 2006. In addition to a few re-mastered songs from The Approach, remixes by Combichrist, Diskonnekted, Neikka RPM, Implant, and Klutae are included.

The Havestar EP also highlights the first collaboration with producer and artist Wade Alin, who is known for music works Christ Analogue, The Atomica Project, and Scanalyzer. This collaborative process adds a consistent working sound quality that carries forward to I:Scintilla's following full-length album Optics.

After its release, Havestar peaked at #13 on the Deutsche Alternative Charts Top 20 Singles list.

=== Optics and The Immortal Tour (2007–2008) ===
I:Scintilla released their second full-length album Optics in June 2007. The album was released in single-CD format as well as a two-disc edition, containing a second disc entirely of remixes by bands such as Combichrist, Clan of Xymox, and Angelspit.

Optics peaked at #6 on the Deutsche Alternative Charts Top 10 Albums list, and was featured in multiple alternative magazines. Preceding the album release, I:Scintilla performed at Wave-Gotik-Treffen in May 2007.

I:Scintilla joined with the then-Tallahassee-based darkwave band The Crüxshadows and Canadian electro act Ayria for the U.S. stretch of The Crüxshadows' Immortal Tour in 2008. Chad Mines (bass/guitar) left the band shortly before this tour and was replaced with Justin Pogue (synthesizers).

=== Dying & Falling (2009–2011) ===
In 2009, Justin Pogue left the band and was replaced by Brent Leitner (guitar).

On December 4, 2009, I:Scintilla released an EP titled Prey On You. The EP contained three new songs and five remixes of these songs. Two songs, Prey On You and Ammunition, were later released on I:Scintilla's third full-length album Dying & Falling, which was released on November 26, 2010. Like Optics, this album was released with a single disc version and a limited edition containing a second disc. This second disc contained the third song from the Prey On You, another previously unreleased track, and nine remixes.

=== Marrow EPs (2012–present) ===
In 2012, I:Scintilla announced they would be releasing a series of EPs entitled "Marrow". The first of these EPs, Marrow 1, was released on October 15, 2012. This album was a dramatic change in musical styles. Abandoning their signature metal-electronica style, this album had a more acoustic sound to it. With five tracks, Marrow 1 contained one new song, Drag Along, two reworked versions from songs previously on Dying & Falling, as well as two covers.

Shortly after the December 12, 2012, release of Marrow 1, a new single was digitally released containing a new song, Skin Tight, and two remixes of Skin Tight. A month later, I:Scintilla announced a remix contest for Skin Tight as well as a new album, Marrow 2. The winning remix artist would have their song featured on the upcoming album. The band received 64 submissions and allowed their fan base to vote on which song should be included on the album. The votes were cast in a unique fashion counting cash donations as votes. All proceeds from the votes were donated to the Amnesty International charity.

Marrow 2 was released on May 2, 2013, and marked a return to their signature style. The album contains four new studio recordings as well as four remixes.

On September 21, 2018, I:Scintilla released Swayed, their first full-length studio album in nearly eight years.

== Band members ==
=== Current members ===
- Jim Cookas – lead guitar, keyboards, programming (2002–present), rhythm guitar (2022–present)
- Brittany Bindrim – vocals (2003–present)
- Vincent Grech – drums (2006–present)
- Dean Dunakin – bass (2015–present)

=== Former members ===
- Jason Allen – rhythm guitar, programming (2003–2005)
- Chad Mines – bass (2003–2005), rhythm guitar (2005–2008)
- Bethany Whisenhunt – bass (2005–2006)
- Justin Pogue – keyboards (2008–2009)
- Brent Leitner – rhythm guitar, programming (2009–2013)
- Brandon Chase – bass (2011–2012)
- John Freriks – rhythm guitar (2013–2017)
- Myles Arwine – rhythm guitar (2018–2022)

== Discography ==
=== Studio albums ===
- The Approach – 2004 – self-released
- Optics – 2007 – Alfa Matrix
- Dying & Falling – 2010 – Alfa Matrix
- Swayed – 2018 – Alfa Matrix

=== Singles and EPs ===
- Havestar – 2006 – Alfa Matrix
- Prey On You – 2009 – Alfa Matrix
- Marrow 1 – 2012 – Alfa Matrix
- Skin Tight – 2012 – Alfa Matrix
- Marrow 2 – 2013 – Alfa Matrix
- Carmena Saturna – 2018 – Alfa Matrix
- Boxing Glove – 2018 – Alfa Matrix
- Swayed – 2018 – Alfa Matrix
- It Can't Rain All The Time – 2021 – self-released
- TIX3 – 2021 – self-released
- HEAD – 2022 – self-released

=== Remixes ===
- Neikka RPM – Rise of the 13th Serpent Limited Edition Bonus CD
  - Neikka RPM – My Innocence is Gone (I:Scintilla Remix) (5:48)
- Manufactura – In the Company of Wolves
  - Manufactura – Deep Waters (Opheila's Descent Mix By I:Scintilla Vs. Destroid) (5:29)
- Endzeit Bunkertracks [Act – IV]
  - Angelspit – Girl Poison (I:Scintilla Mix) (4:04)

=== Compilations ===
- OpeningBands.comp: A Snapshot of Champaign-Urbana 2003 – 2003
  - Fidelidad
- Green St. Records: Playlisted – 2005
  - Capsella (Toxin Mix)
- Advanced Electronics Vol. 5 – 2006
  - Capsella (Toxix Mix)
- Clubtrax Vol. 2 – 2006
  - Havestar (4:40)
- Dark Visions – 2006
  - Capsella (Toxin Mix) (3:38)
- Endzeit Bunkertracks [Act II] – 2006
  - Havestar (Combichrist Mix) (4:40)
- Gothic Compilation Part XXXIV – 2006
  - Scin (4:34)
- Matri-X-Trax (Chapter 3) – 2006
  - Havestar (Combichrist Mix) (4:45)
  - Scin (4:33)
  - Havestar (4:43)
- New Signs & Sounds 09/06 – 2006
  - Havestar (4:43)
- Orkus Compilation 22 – 2006
  - Scin (3:31)
- Re:Connected [2.0] – 2006
  - Havestar (4:39)
- Sonic Seducer Cold Hands Seduction Vol. 63 – 2006
  - Havestar (4:46)
- Sounds from the Matrix 003 – 2006
  - Capsella Bursa Pastoris (Toxin Mix) (3:37)
- Sounds from the Matrix 004 – 2006
  - Scin (4:33)
- WTII Records Sunday Showcase 2 Year Anniversary Sampler – 2006
  - Toy Soldier (Bounte Remix) (4:49)
- Dark Summer 2007 • 1 – 2007
  - Translate (Broken Reception Mix by Manufactura) (4:47)
- Extreme Degeneration 1 – 2007
  - The Bells (4:31)
- Fuck the Mainstream Vol. 1 – 2007
  - Cursive Eve (5:37)
- Gothic Compilation Part XXXVII – 2007
  - Cursive Eve (5:37)
- Nacht Der Maschinen Volume One – 2007
  - Havestar (Combichrist Mix) (4:40)
- New Signs & Sounds 06/07 – 2007
  - Cursive Eve (5:38)
- Sounds from the Matrix 05 – 2007
  - Bolivia (5:38)
- Sounds from the Matrix 06 – 2007
  - Toy Soldier (3:53)
- The Giant Minutes to the Dawn – 2007
  - Bolivia (5:38)
- Alfa Matrix Re:connected [3.0] – 2008
  - The Bells (Angelspit Mix) (5:01)
- Sonic Seducer Cold Hands Seduction Vol. 82 – 2008
  - Salt of Stones (Exklusiv Live)
- Alfa Matrix re:covered – a tribute to Depeche Mode – 2009
  - I Want It All
  - I Want It All (Essence of Mind mix)
- Sounds from the Matrix 013 – 2012
  - Skin Tight (3:44)
