= Marrow 2 =

EP by I:Scintilla
- Released: May 2, 2013
- Genre: Industrial
- Length: 34:02
- Label: Alfa Matrix

I:Scintilla chronology
Marrow 1 (2012)	Marrow 2 (2013)	TBA

Marrow 2 is the fourth EP of the Illinois-based industrial band, I:Scintilla, and the second in their Marrow series. "Drag Along" is a reworked version of a song previously on the acoustic album Marrow 1.

The artwork was illustrated by singer Brittany Bindrim.

== Track listing ==
1. "Ruin" - 04:09
2. "Skin Tight" - 03:41
3. "Sequins & Pills" - 03:43
4. "Drag Along" - 04:49
5. "Skin Tight (Bounte Mix)" - 03:13
6. "Skin Tight (Hardwire Mix))" - 03:58
7. "Sequins & Pills (Cellhavoc Mix)" - 04:00
8. "Ruin (Acidrodent Mix)" - 06:29
