= Robert D. Morrow Sr. =

American politician

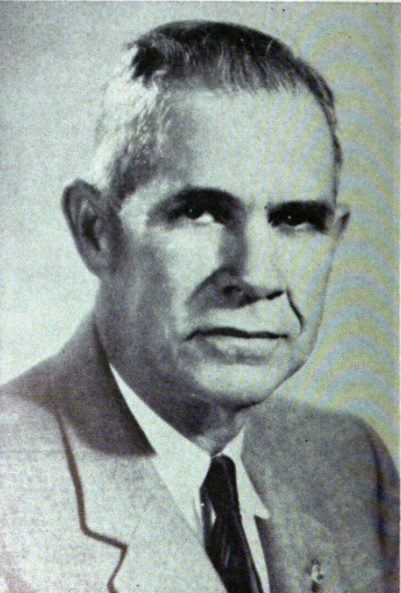
- Morrow in 1960

43rd Treasurer of Mississippi
- In office 1956–1960
- Governor: James P. Coleman
- Preceded by: Newton James
- Succeeded by: Evelyn Gandy

Personal details
- Born: December 31, 1894; Monroe County, Mississippi, U.S.
- Died: August 25, 1985 (aged 90); Brandon, Mississippi, U.S.
- Relatives: James A. Morrow Sr. (brother); James A. Morrow Jr. (nephew)

Robert Dowden Morrow Sr. (December 31, 1894 – August 25, 1985), also known as R. D. Morrow, was an American politician. He served as treasurer of Mississippi from 1956 to 1960.

== Life and career ==
Robert Dowden Morrow was born on December 31, 1894 in Amory, Mississippi. He was the son of David B. and Bessie Anna (Rogers) Morrow. He served in World War I, where he became commissioned as an officer. After the war, he attended Mississippi State College, obtaining a Bachelor of Science degree in agriculture in 1922, and then was a Professor of Agronomy there between 1922 and 1924 before obtaining his Master of Science degree in Agronomy there in 1925. Between 1926 and 1928, he was a State Service Commissioner in Mississippi.

Morrow married Louise May on December 25, 1922. Their children included Robert Dowden Morrow Jr. and David L. Morrow.

Morrow served as treasurer of Mississippi from 1956 to 1960. In 1960, Morrow became the state bank comptroller.

Morrow died on August 25, 1985, at the age of 90 in Brandon, Mississippi.
