= Optics (album) =

Studio album by I:Scintilla
- Released: June 15, 2007
- Genre: Industrial
- Length: 55:00 (Bonus CD 62:20)
- Label: Alfa Matrix
- Producer: Wade Alin and Jim Cookas

I:Scintilla chronology
Havestar (2004)	Optics (2007)	Prey On You (2009)

Alternate cover
- The cover used on the limited edition release.

Optics is the second album of the Illinois-based industrial band, I:Scintilla. It was released with two versions, a single disc version and a limited edition two disc version containing remixes.

== Track listing ==
1. "Cursive Eve" - 5:33
2. "Toy Soldier" - 3:53
3. "The Bells" - 4:32
4. "Melt" - 5:22
5. "Translate" - 4:01
6. "Scin" - 4:33
7. "Machine Vision" - 4:37
8. "Havestar" - 4:37
9. "Ultravioletfly" - 4:07
10. "Silhouette" - 4:15
11. "Taken" - 4:38
12. "Salt of Stones" - 4:52

== Bonus CD Track Listings ==
1. "The Bells [Angelspit Mix]" - 4:59
2. "Scin [Clan of Xymox Mix]" - 5:33
3. "Havestar [Combichrist Mix]" - 4:41
4. "Cursive Eve [Zero Tolerance Treatment by Deathboy]" - 5:25
5. "The Bells [Ego Likeness Mix]" - 6:01
6. "Taken [En Take Mix by En Esch]" - 5:51
7. "The Bells [Interface Mix]" - 5:18
8. "Translate [Broken Reception Mix by Manufactura]" - 4:47
9. "Havestar [LA Malediction Mix by Mortis]" - 4:29
10. "Capsella [Stochastic Theory Mix]" - 4:36
11. "Scin [Tolchock Mix]" - 5:12
12. "Taken [Shaken Mix by En Esch]" - 5:28
