= Marrow 1 =

EP by I:Scintilla
- Released: October 15, 2012
- Recorded: Gridwave Studios, Plano, IL
- Genre: Industrial, acoustic
- Length: 18:58
- Label: Alfa Matrix
- Producer: Brent Leitner & Jim Cookas

I:Scintilla chronology
Dying & Falling (2010)	Marrow 1 (2012)	Marrow 2 (2013)

Marrow 1 is the third EP of the Illinois-based industrial band, I:Scintilla, and the first in their Marrow series. All songs are acoustic. "Ammunition" and "The Shake" are acoustic covers of I:Scintilla songs from previous albums. "Girl U Want" is a Devo cover, and "Spit It Out" is an IAMX cover.

The artwork was illustrated by singer Brittany Bindrim.

== Track listing ==
1. "Drag Along" - 02:49
2. "Girl U Want" - 04:09
3. "Ammunition" - 04:50
4. "Spit It Out" - 03:16
5. "The Shake" - 03:54
