= James A. Morrow Sr. =

American politician

Member of the Mississippi House of Representatives from the Rankin County district
- In office January 1936 – January 1944

Personal details
- Born: March 12, 1892 Chickasaw County, Mississippi, U.S.
- Died: April 10, 1967 (aged 75) Brandon, Mississippi, U.S.
- Party: Democratic
- Relations: Robert D. Morrow Sr. (brother)
- Children: James Jr.; Eunice

James Anthony Morrow Sr. (March 12, 1892 – April 10, 1967) was an American Democratic politician. He was a member of the Mississippi House of Representatives from 1936 to 1944.

== Biography ==
James Anthony Morrow was born on March 12, 1892, near Okolona, Chickasaw County, Mississippi. He was the son of David B. Morrow and Bessie Anna (Rogers) Morrow. James fought for the United States in World War I. He moved to Decatur, Texas, where he worked for Lillard Mining Company. He then moved to Portales, New Mexico, where he worked for Kramer Mill & Elevator Company. After getting married in 1922, his son James was born in Clovis, New Mexico, in 1923. His family moved to Brandon, Mississippi, in 1926. In the 1940s, he was a farmer and a bus/service station agent by occupation, and he later became a businessman. He represented Rankin County in the Mississippi House of Representatives from 1936 to 1944. He died in a hospital in Brandon, Mississippi, on April 10, 1967.

== Personal life and family ==
Morrow was a Baptist by religion. He was a member of the Freemasons and the American Legion.

Morrow married Mildred Hamlin (1901–1989) on September 30, 1922, in her parents' residence in Farwell, Texas. had at least two children together. Morrow's son, James Anthony Morrow Jr., was a member of the Mississippi House of Representatives from 1952 to 1988. Morrow Sr. also had a daughter named Eunice, a physiotherapist who moved to San Francisco, California. Morrow's younger brother, Robert, was the State Treasurer of Mississippi from 1956 to 1960.
