= James A. Morrow Jr. =

American attorney, cattle farmer and Democratic politician

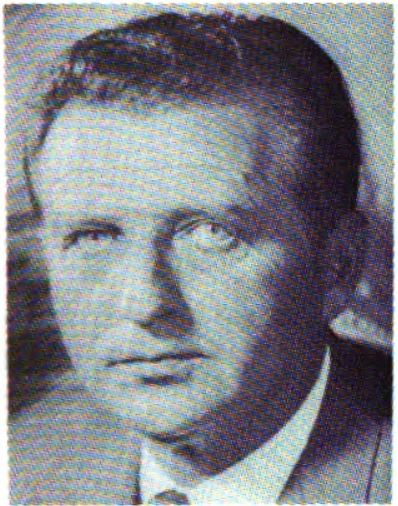
- c. 1968

Member of the Mississippi House of Representatives from the 60th district
- In office January 1952 – January 1988
- Succeeded by: Cecil McCrory

Personal details
- Born: September 22, 1923 Clovis, New Mexico
- Died: September 11, 1990 (aged 66) Brandon, Mississippi
- Party: Democratic
- Relations: Robert D. Morrow Sr. (uncle)
- Parent: James A. Morrow Sr. (father)

James Anthony Morrow Jr. (September 22, 1923 - September 11, 1990) was an American attorney, cattle farmer, and Democratic politician. He was a member of the Mississippi House of Representatives from 1952 to 1988.

== Early life ==
James Anthony Morrow Jr. was born on September 22, 1923, in Clovis, New Mexico. He was the son of James A. Morrow Sr. (1892-1967), a farmer, businessman, and member of the Mississippi House of Representatives from 1936 to 1944, and his wife, Mildred H. (1901-1989). The family moved from New Mexico to Brandon, Mississippi, in 1926. Morrow Jr. graduated from Brandon High School and the Jackson School of Law. He served in the U. S. Merchant Marine in World War II and the Korean War.

== Career ==
Morrow first became a member of the Mississippi House of Representatives in 1952. In 1956, he entered a law practice with Joe Buck in Brandon. During his legislative service, he wrote legislation to create the Ross Barnett Reservoir and Jackson International Airport, and was the chairman of the board created to supervise construction of the reservoir. He also led efforts to locate the 172nd Airlift Wing in Jackson Airport. He served continuously in the House until 1988, having decided not to run for re-election in 1987. He was succeeded by Cecil McCrory, who had been born shortly before Morrow had begun his first term.

== Personal life and death ==
Morrow was an Episcopalian. He never married.

He died of heart failure on September 11, 1990, in Brandon, Mississippi. His only immediate survivor was his sister, Eunice Morrow, a retired physiotherapist living in San Francisco, California. In November 1991, a portion of Mississippi Highway 18 (going from Brandon to the border of Rankin and Smith Counties) was named after him.
