= School of Visual Arts v. Kuprewicz =

- Court: New York Supreme Court
- Full case name: School of Visual Arts et al., Plaintiffs, v. Diane Kuprewicz et al., Defendants
- Decided: December 22, 2003
- Citation: 3 Misc. 3d 278; 771 N.Y.S.2d 804; 2003 N.Y. Misc. LEXIS 1668; 20 I.E.R. Cas. (BNA) 1488

Court membership
- Judge sitting: Justice Rosalyn H. Richter

School of Visual Arts v. Diane Kuprewicz, 771 N.Y.S.2d 804 (2003), is a New York Supreme Court case in which it was held that sending and/or directing "large volumes of unsolicited job applications and pornographic e-mails" by defendant to plaintiff if it depletes hard disk space, drains processing power, and negatively impacts other system resources of the plaintiff is sufficient to establish "a cause of action for trespass to chattels." The ruling has been followed and cited in a number of cases in different jurisdictions.

== Facts ==
School of Visual Arts (SVA) and its director of human resources, Laurie Pearlberg, brought a lawsuit against Diane Kuprewicz, a former employee of SVA, alleging that Kuprewicz was "engaged in a campaign of unlawful harassment against plaintiffs." Allegedly, Kuprewicz had posted "two false job listings on craigslist.com", a classified advertisement website, advertising for Pearlberg's position that was not vacant at the time. Kuprewicz had instructed prospective applicants to send their resume as well as a cover letter "to Pearlberg's supervisor at SVA". The job postings seemed legitimate and included "accurate contact information." Plaintiffs also claimed that Kuprewicz had sent "a similar job listing for Pearlberg's position" to official email of SVA's human resources in a format that resembled its posting at monster.com. Finally, plaintiffs contended that Kuprewicz had provided "Pearlberg's SVA email address to various pornographic websites" and sent Pearlberg a number of sexually explicit E-cards at her official SVA email account. Accordingly, as a result of Kuprewicz's actions, Pearlberg had been receiving a "large volumes of unwanted sexually explicit emails" as well as "unwanted catalogs offering pornographic materials" even by "regular mail at her work address".

== Legal issues ==
Plaintiff's complaint enumerated six causes of action for "false designation of origin under the Lanham Act, defamation and trade libel, violation of [New York] Civil Rights Law §§ 50 - 51, trespass to chattels and intentional interference with prospective economic advantage." Responding to "plaintiff's motion for preliminary injunctive relief", Kuprewicz filed a motion "to dismiss the complaint in its entirety for failure to state a cause of action." The court maintained that determination of the latter motion is only possible after accepting "as true all of the facts alleged in the complaint as well as all reasonable inferences that may be gleaned from those facts." Then the court must decide whether "assuming truth of the facts alleged, the complaint states the elements of a legally cognizable cause of action." Consequently, if it finds the allegations as "merely conclusory" and without factual grounds, the court can dismiss the complaint due to its failure "to state a cause of action." Therefore, the court turned to each issue that had been raised in the complaint to see if that could establish a cause of action and finally concluded that "the only viable cause of action pleaded in the complaint is defendant SVA's claim for common law trespass to chattels."

1. Trespass to Chattels

The court maintained that to qualify for a trespass to chattels, "SVA must prove that Kuprewicz intentionally, and without justification or consent, physically interfered with the use and enjoyment of personal property in SVA's possession" and that had harmed SVA. The court noted that liability in trespass to chattels arises "only" if the defendant's interference "with another's chattel" would result in harm to "the [owner's] materially valuable interest in the physical condition, quality, or value of the chattel, or if the [owner] is deprived of the use of the chattel for a substantial time". Additionally, plaintiff must show that defendant have acted "with the intention of interfering with the property or with knowledge that such interference is substantially certain to result." Since plaintiffs' allegations submitted that "Kuprewicz caused "large volumes" of unsolicited job applications and pornographic e-mails to be sent to SVA and Pearlberg by way of SVA's computer system, without their consent" and also as they claimed that those "unsolicited e-mails have "depleted hard disk space, drained processing power, and adversely affected other system resources on SVA's computer system"...", the court concluded that "SVA [had] sufficiently stated a cause of action for trespass to chattels."

The reasoning of court in this regard has been followed in Ziegler, Ziegler & Assocs. LLP v. China Digital Media Corp. 2010 U.S. Dist. LEXIS 84506, In re JetBlue Airways Corp. Privacy Litigation., 379 F. Supp. 2d 299 and Holt v. Macy's Retail Holdings, Inc., 719 F. Supp. 2d 903. Also, a number of cases have cited this case's reasoning concerned with trespass to chattels such as Yo! Braces Orthodontics, PLLC v.Theodorou, 2011 NY Slip Op 31012(U), Hecht v. Components Intl., Inc., 22 Misc. 3d 360, Biosafe-One, Inc. v. Hawks, 639 F. Supp. 2d 358 (2009)

2. Defamation and Trade Libel

Plaintiffs submitted that "fictitious job listings" by Kuperwicz on Craigslist had defamed them. Pearlberg claimed that those postings were "false statements to the public that SVA was seeking to replace" her as SVA's Director of Human Resources. In addition to its allegation of defamation, SVA submitted that Kuprewicz "committed the tort of trade libel." The court, however, decided that "the simple statement that Pearlberg's position was vacant" could not "reasonably construed as imputing professional unfitness or incompetence to Pearlberg" and was not sufficient to "constitute defamation." Also, SVA's allegation of being defamed was not based on a convincing ground as "the postings merely announce[d] a job opening at SVA" and could not "be reasonably susceptible of any defamatory meanings." Citing precedents, the court maintained that the assessment of defamatory meaning of particular statement is "a legal question to be resolved by the court in the first instance." In conducting such an assessment, " the words must be given a fair reading and must be construed in the context of the entire statements as a whole tested against the understanding of the average reader." If the result shows that the words in question are not "reasonably susceptible of a defamatory meaning, they are not actionable and cannot be made so by a strained or artificial construction". With reference to SVA's trade libel claim the court maintained that "SVA must allege facts that Kuprewicz knowingly published false matter derogatory to SVA's business that was calculated to prevent other from dealing with SVA or interfering with SVA's relations with others, to its detriment." Nevertheless, as there was not any "false matter derogatory statement to SVA's business" in those job listings, the court concluded that trade libel as a "cause of action must also be dismissed."

3 & 4. Claims under the Lanham Act: false designation of origin / dilution

SVA contended that Kuperwicz's false job postings violated 15 U.S.C. § 1125(a) "by using in commerce a false designation of origin which caused deception, confusion and mistake" about her "connection and affiliation with SVA" as well as "the origin, sponsorship and approval" of her actions by SVA "("the false designation of origin claim")." Also, SVA alleged that Kuperwicz's activities violated 15 U.S.C § 1125 [C] by causing "negative associations with and thus dilut[ing] the distinctive quality of SVA's service mark." Emphasizing the language of act, the court maintained that "SVA must prove that the false designation was used "in commerce" and "in connection with...goods or services" (15 U.S.C. § 1125 [a]) in order to establish "a cause of action for false designation of origin" and also "establish that Kuprewicz's use of the mark was a "commercial use in commerce" (15 U.S.C. § 1125 [c])" to sustain its dilution claim. The court noted that "the non-commercial use of a mark is simply not actionable under the Lanham Act." As such, the court found no allegation that showing "Kuprewicz was involved in any business or had any goods or services to advertise, distribute, sell or offer" or alternatively any claim about her competition "with SVA or otherwise attempting to divert business or customers from SVA." Therefore, the court concluded that even "accepting all of SVA's factual allegations as true, the complaint fail[ed] to state a cause of action" for either claims, i.e. false designation of origin or dilution, "under the Lanham act."

5. Violation of Civil Rights Law § 51: "New York's right to privacy statute"

Pearlberg claimed that Kuprewicz had violated her right to privacy by using her name on false job listings and "in connection with subscribing to pornographic websites and catalogs." However, the court dismissed such claims for two reasons. Firstly, there was no evidence that Pearlberg's "actual name was used on the job postings or in connection with the pornographic websites." Secondly, the court found that Pearlberg's claim was out of "the reach of the statute". New York's Civil Rights Law § 51 was cited as holding that "any person whose name...is used with this state for advertising purposes or for the purposes of trade without the written consent [of such person](emphasis added)" could bring an action for damages. However, there was not any indication, whatsoever, that Kuperwicz had used Pearlberg's name for advertising purposes. To vividly illustrate what was meant by "advertising purposes", the court quoted earlier precedents that held to qualify for advertising purposes a given person's name must appear "in a publication which, taken in its entirety, was distributed for use in, or as part of, an advertisement or solicitation for patronage of a particular product or service". Given the factual circumstance of the case, the court dismissed Pearlberg's claims under the New York's Civil Rights Law.

6. Intentional interference with prospective economic advantage

SVA claimed that false job postings by Kuprewicz had unduly interfered with its "hiring and recruiting activities" as well as "with the existing employment relationship between Pearlberg and SVA." Dismissing SVA's claim due to lack of a plausible cause of action, the court maintained that "an essential element of [such] tort is that the plaintiff would have consummated a contract with another person but for the interference of the defendant." Therefore, in order to establish such cause of action "SVA must allege that Kuprewicz intentionally interfered with a pre-contractual business relationship either by unlawful means or by lawful means without justification." Yet, given the fact that Pearlberg's position was not vacant, SVA could not have "contracted with any of the applicants." This means that no contract would have been concluded in the absence of Kuperwicz's interference.

== Holding ==
The court granted Kuperwicz's "cross-motion to dismiss the complaint" with regards to "plaintiffs' claims for Lanham Act violations..., trade libel and defamation..., violation of Civil Rights Law §§ 50-51..., and intentional interference with prospective economic advantage." Yet, it denied Kuprewicz's "cross-motion to dismiss the complaint" regarding plaintiff's "claim for common law trespass to chattels."

== See also ==
- Intel Corp. v. Hamidi
- eBay v. Bidder's Edge
- Lanham Act
- CompuServe Inc. v. Cyber Promotions, Inc.
