= Letang v Cooper =

1964 English negligence case

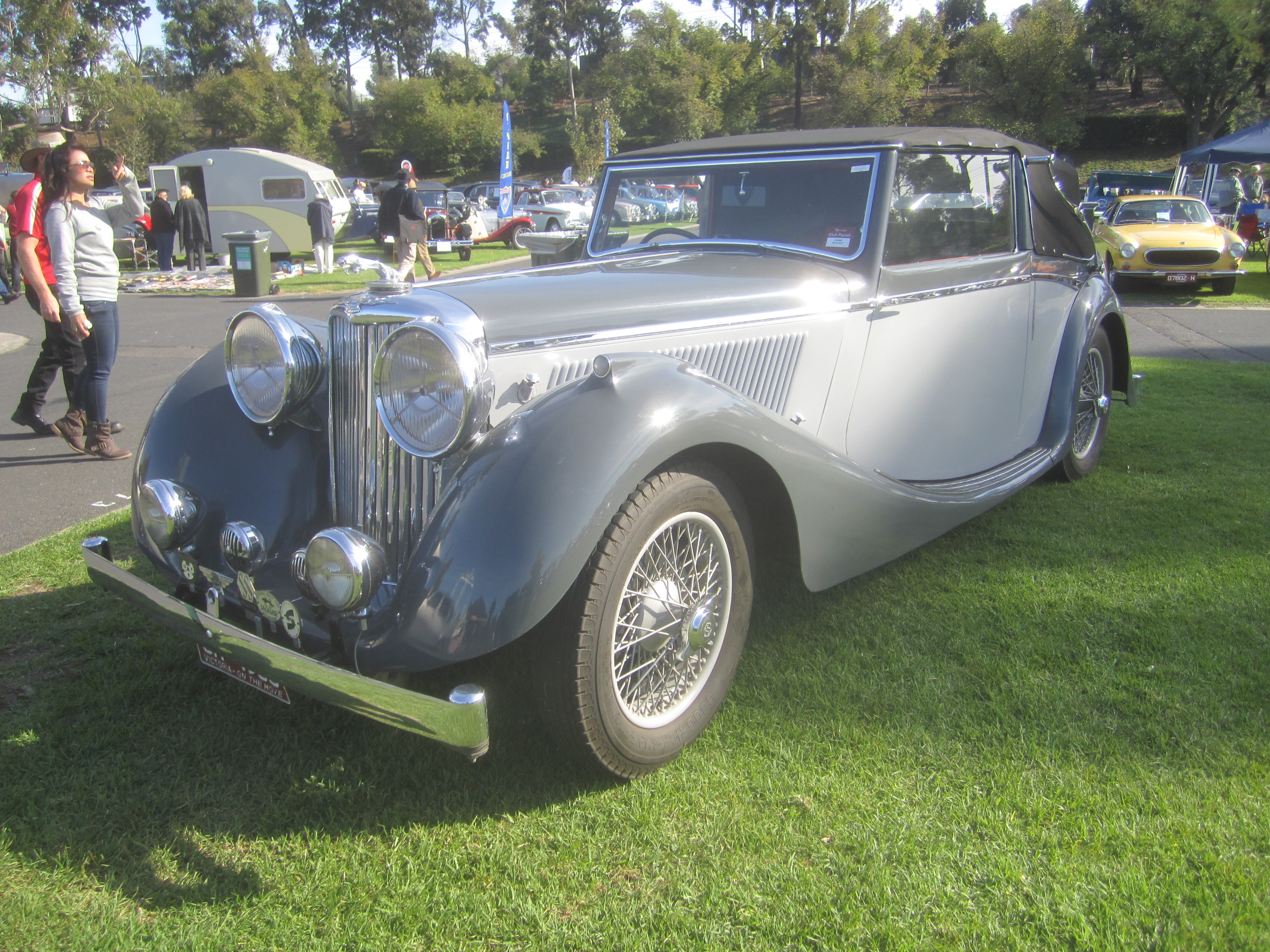
- A Jaguar motor car
- Court: Court of Appeal
- Full case name: Doreen Ann Letang v Frank Anthony Cooper
- Decided: 15 June 1964
- Citations: [1965] 1 QB 232 [1964] EWCA Civ 5 [1964] 2 Lloyd's Rep 339 [1964] 2 All ER 929
- Transcript: BAILII transcript

Court membership
- Judges sitting: Lord Denning MR, Diplock LJ and Danckwerts LJ

Keywords
- Negligence, personal injury, trespass to the person

Letang v Cooper [1964] EWCA Civ 5 (15 June 1964) is an English Court of Appeal judgment, by which it was decided that negligently caused personal injury cannot be recovered under the trespass to the person, but the tort of negligence must be tried instead.

== Facts ==
Mr Cooper (the defendant) negligently ran over Mrs Letang (the plaintiff) in his Jaguar motor car while she was sunbathing on a piece of grass where cars were parked. The plaintiff filed a claim in trespass to the person, because the claim in negligence was time-barred. Trespass to the person is a tort involving wrongful direct interference with another person and traditionally included both intentional and negligent acts.

== Judgment ==
The Court of Appeal, consisting of Lord Denning MR, Diplock LJ and Danckwerts LJ, held unanimously that since Mr Cooper's actions were negligent rather than intentional, the statute of limitations barring claims actions for damage caused by negligence applied, meaning that Mrs. Letang could not recover as she had filed suit too late.

== Effect ==
The effect of this case was that an action for trespass to the person can now only be brought for intentional torts, such as assault, battery, false imprisonment, trespass to land or chattels, etc. A claimant wishing to recover damages to his person or property that were caused by the defendant's negligent action must prove all the elements of the tort of negligence. However the decision did not affect actions for trespass to goods. Conversion is still a strict liability tort under English law, and recover does not depend upon establishing negligence.

Lord Denning summarised the change:

Under the old law, whenever one man injured another by the direct and immediate application of force, the plaintiff could sue the defendant in trespass to the person, without alleging negligence (see Leame v. Bray, in 1803, 3 East, 593), whereas if the injury was only consequential, he had to sue in case. You will remember the illustration given by Mr Justice Fortescue in Reynolds v. Clarke, in 1726 (1 Strange, 634):-

"If a man throws a log into the highway and in that act it hits me, I may maintain trespass because it is an immediate wrong; but if, as it lies there, I tumble over it and receive an injury, I must bring an action upon the case because it is only prejudicial in consequence."

Nowadays, if a man carelessly throws a piece of wood from a house into a roadway, then whether it hits the plaintiff or he tumbles over it the next moment, the action would not be trespass or case, but simply negligence.

== See also ==
- English tort law
- Venning v Chin – South Australia case placing burden of proof in road traffic injury cases on the plaintiff
