= Internet bot =

Software that runs automated tasks on the Internet

An Internet bot (also called a web robot or robot), or simply bot, is a software application that runs automated tasks (scripts) on the Internet, usually with the intent to imitate human activity, such as messaging, on a large scale.An Internet bot plays the client role in a client–server model whereas the server role is usually played by web servers. Internet bots are able to perform simple and repetitive tasks much faster than a person could ever do. The most extensive use of bots is for web crawling, in which an automated script fetches, analyzes and files information from web servers. More than half of all web traffic is generated by bots.

Efforts by web servers to restrict bots vary. Some servers have a robots.txt file that contains the rules requesting how bots should behave on the website. Any bot that does not follow the rules could, in theory, be denied access to the affected website, while in practice, a website owner can force a bot to follow the rules or ensure that a bot's creator or implementer reads or acknowledges the robots.txt file. Some bots are "good", e.g. search engine spiders, while other "bad" bots are used to launch malicious attacks on websites or applications, such as political campaigns.

Activity and manipulated reviews have also had an impact on mobile app stores. In a 2023 investigation, consumer advocacy organisation Which? discovered that some of these applications which were available on both the Apple App Store and Google Play had suspicious activity in their reviews. The analysis revealed that a percentage of highly-rated applications had reviews that were suspicious, highlighting concerns about the trustworthiness of app ratings and their impact on consumers.

== IM and IRC ==
Some bots communicate with users of Internet-based services via instant messaging (IM), Internet Relay Chat (IRC), or other web interfaces such as Facebook bots and Twitter bots. These chatbots may allow people to ask questions in plain English and then formulate a response. Such bots can often handle reporting weather, postal code information, sports scores, currency or other unit conversions, etc. Others are used for entertainment, such as SmarterChild on AOL Instant Messenger and MSN Messenger.

Additional roles of an IRC bot may be to listen on a conversation channel, and to comment on certain phrases uttered by the participants (based on pattern matching). This is sometimes used as a help service for new users or to censor profanity.

== Social bots ==
Social bots are sets of algorithms that take on the duties of repetitive sets of instructions in order to establish a service or connection among social networking users. Among the various designs of networking bots, the most common are chat bots, algorithms designed to converse with a human user, and social bots, algorithms designed to mimic human behaviors to converse with patterns similar to those of a human user. The history of social botting can be traced back to Alan Turing in the 1950s and his vision of designing sets of instructional code approved by the Turing test. In the 1960s Joseph Weizenbaum created ELIZA, a natural language processing computer program considered an early indicator of artificial intelligence algorithms. ELIZA inspired computer programmers to design task-oriented programs that can match behavior patterns to their sets of instructions. As a result, natural language processing has become an influencing factor in the development of artificial intelligence and social bots. And as information and thought see a progressive mass spreading on social media websites, innovative technological advancements are made following the same pattern.

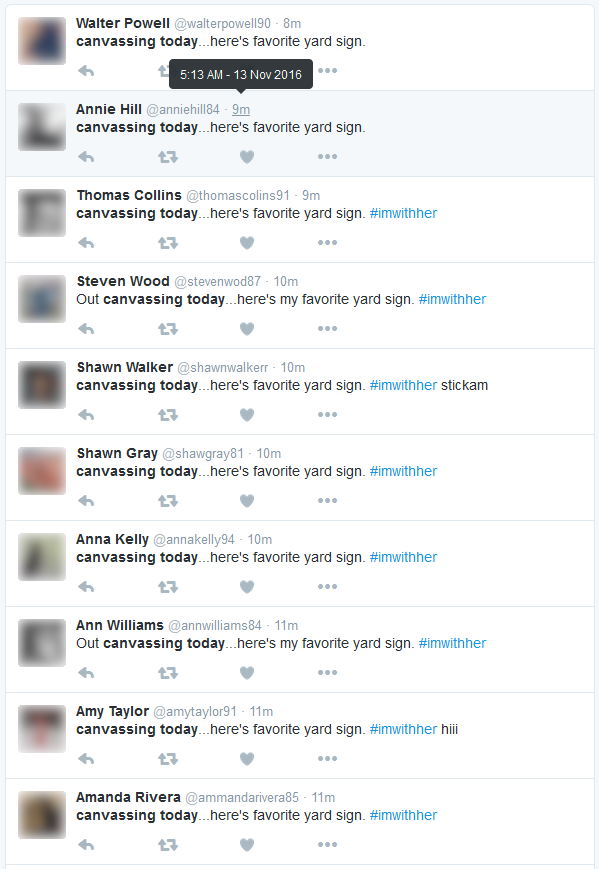
Twitter bots posting similar messages five days after the 2016 United States elections

Reports of political interferences in recent elections, including the 2016 US and 2017 UK general elections, have set the notion of bots being more prevalent because of the ethics that is challenged between the bot's design and the bot's designer. Emilio Ferrara, a computer scientist from the University of Southern California reporting on Communications of the ACM, said the lack of resources available to implement fact-checking and information verification results in the large volumes of false reports and claims made about these bots on social media platforms. In the case of Twitter, most of these bots are programmed with search filter capabilities that target keywords and phrases favoring political agendas and then retweet them. While the attention of bots is programmed to spread unverified information throughout the social media platforms, it is a challenge that programmers face in the wake of a hostile political climate. The Bot Effect is what Ferrara reported as the socialization of bots and human users creating a vulnerability to the leaking of personal information and polarizing influences outside the ethics of the bot's code, and was confirmed by Guillory Kramer in his study where he observed the behavior of emotionally volatile users and the impact the bots have on them, altering their perception of reality.

== Commercial bots ==
There has been a great deal of controversy about the use of bots to aggregate auction listings and automate betting. In the 2000 case, eBay v. Bidder's Edge, auction website eBay obtained a preliminary injunction against Bidder's Edge using bots to aggregate listings from eBay's site due to the potential for disruption of the site. However, in 2003, the California Supreme Court in Intel Corp v. Hamidi rejected an interpretation based on eBay that unauthorized use alone would constitute harm and trespass.

The United Kingdom-based bet exchange, Betfair, saw such a large amount of traffic coming from bots that it launched a WebService API in 2004, aimed at bot programmers, through which it can actively manage bot interactions.

Bot farms are known to be used in online app stores, like the Apple App Store and Google Play, to manipulate positions or increase positive ratings/reviews.

A rapidly growing form of internet bot is the chatbot. From 2016, when Facebook Messenger allowed developers to place chatbots on their platform, there has been an exponential growth of their use on that app alone. 30,000 bots were created for Messenger in the first six months, rising to 100,000 by September 2017. Avi Ben Ezra, CTO of SnatchBot, told Forbes that evidence from the use of their chatbot building platform pointed to a near future saving of millions of hours of human labor as 'live chat' on websites was replaced with bots.

Companies use internet bots to increase online engagement and streamline communication. Companies often use bots to cut down on cost; instead of employing people to communicate with consumers, companies have developed new ways to be efficient. These chatbots are used to answer customers' questions; for example, Domino's developed a chatbot that can take orders via Facebook Messenger. Chatbots allow companies to allocate their employees' time to other tasks.

== Malicious bots ==
According to Cloudflare, a bot attack is "a type of cyber attack that uses automated scripts to disrupt a site, steal data, make fraudulent purchases, or perform other malicious actions." Spambots are internet bots that distribute large amounts of spam on the internet, often in order to transmit advertising links, but they can also spread malware or create fake user accounts. Attackers can use malware (such as a virus or Trojan horse) or other methods to compromise multiple devices and organize them into a malicious botnet for coordinating automated attacks, such as denial-of-service attacks.

According to Incapsula's 2016 Bot Traffic Report, 94.2% of 100,000 randomly selected domains experienced a bot attack.

Examples of malicious bots, botnets, and bot-related attacks include:

1. Account takeover bots for password cracking and credential stuffing.
2. Email spambots that harvest email addresses from contact or guestbook pages.
3. Website scrapers (content scrapers) that reuse website content without permission, sometimes on scraper sites or automatically generated doorway pages.
4. Comment spambots and forum spambots distribute malicious links (for phishing, malware distribution, or fraud) via discussion forums, blogs, website comments, or other channels.
5. Registration bots execute a form of email bombing by registering a specific email address with numerous services, which then flood the target's email inbox with confirmation notices that can distract attention from urgent messages indicating a security breach.
6. DDoS attacks carried out using botnets or smurf techniques.
7. Viewbots generate fake views, and clickbots generate fraudulent clicks, activities which distort analytics and can be used to mislead viewers or extract money from advertisers.
8. Scalper bots, also known as scalping bots, automate purchases of scarce goods in high demand for resale at higher prices. Examples include ticket bots and bots for sneakers ("sneaker bots"), other streetwear, game consoles, and highly sought-after holiday merchandise ("grinch bots").
9. Game-farming bots are used in massively multiplayer online role-playing games to rapidly accumulate resources that would otherwise take significant time or effort to obtain, potentially distorting in-game economies.
10. Malicious social bots include troll bots on internet forums that automatically publish inflammatory or nonsensical posts to disrupt the forum or manipulate users. Researchers have also identified malicious semi-automated "cyborg" social media accounts that combine human activity with automation ("bot-assisted humans" and "human-assisted bots").

In 2012, journalist Percy von Lipinski reported that he discovered millions of botted views at CNN iReport. CNN iReport quietly removed millions of views from the account of iReporter Chris Morrow and amended its terms of service to state that "users are prohibited from using pay-per-click websites or other automated systems to artificially inflate page views." It is not known if ad revenue received by CNN from the fake views was ever returned to the advertisers.

== Protection against bots ==
The most widely used anti-bot technique is CAPTCHA, which stands for "Completely Automated Public Turing Test". This test is often used to quickly distinguish a real user from a bot by posing a challenge that a human could easily do but a bot would not. This could be something like recognizing distorted letters or numbers, or picking out specific parts of an image, such as traffic lights on a busy street. CAPTCHAs are a great form of protection due to their ability to be completed quickly, with low effort and easy implementation. Examples of providers include Recaptcha, Minteye, Solve Media and NuCaptcha. However, CAPTCHAs are not foolproof in preventing bots, as they can often be circumvented by computer character recognition, security holes, and outsourcing CAPTCHA solving to cheap laborers.

In the case of academic surveys, protection against auto test-taking bots is essential for maintaining accuracy and consistency in the results of the survey. Without proper precautions against these bots, the results of a survey can become skewed or inaccurate. Researchers indicate that the best way to keep bots out of surveys is to not allow them to enter to begin with. The survey should have participants from a reliable source, such as an existing department or group at work. This way, malicious bots don't have the opportunity to infiltrate the study.

There are also dedicated companies that specialize in protection against bots, including ones like DataDome, Akamai and Imperva. These companies offer defense systems to their clients to protect them against DDoS attacks, infrastructure attacks, and overall cybersecurity. While the pricing rates of these companies can often be expensive, the services offered can be crucial both for large corporations and small businesses.

== Human interaction with social bots ==
There are two main concerns with bots: clarity and face-to-face support. The cultural background of human beings affects the way they communicate with social bots. Others recognize that online bots can "masquerade" as humans online and have become highly aware of their presence. Due to this, some users are becoming unsure when interacting with a social bot.

Many people believe that bots are vastly less intelligent than humans, so they are not worthy of our respect.

Min-Sun Kim proposed five concerns or issues that may arise when communicating with a social robot, and they are avoiding the damage of people's feelings, minimizing impositions, disapproval from others, clarity issues, and how effective their messages may come across.

People who oppose social robots argue that they also take away from the genuine creations of human relationships. Opposition to social bots also notes that the use of social bots adds a new, unnecessary layer to privacy protection. Many users call for stricter legislation in relation to social bots to ensure private information remains preserved. The discussion of what to do with social bots and how far they should go remains ongoing.

== Social bots and political discussions ==
In recent years, political discussion platforms and politics on social media have become highly unstable and volatile. With the introduction of social bots on the political discussion scene, many users worry about their effect on the discussion and election outcomes. The biggest offender on the social media side is X (previously Twitter), where heated political discussions are raised both by bots and real users. The result is a misuse of political discussion on these platforms and a general mistrust among users of what they see.

== See also ==
- Agent-based model (for bot's theory)
- Botnet
- Chatbot
- Comparison of Internet Relay Chat bots
- Dead Internet theory
- Facebook Bots
- IRC bot
- Online algorithm
- Social bot
- Software agent
- Software bot
- Spambot
- Twitterbot
- UBot Studio
- Votebots
- Web brigades
- Wikipedia bots – bots on Wikipedia
