= America Online, Inc. v. IMS =

1998 U.S. District Court case

America Online v. IMS
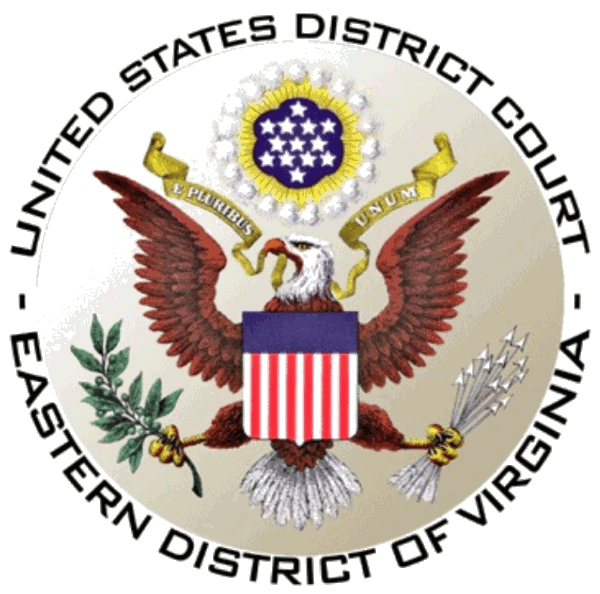
- Court: United States District Court for the Eastern District of Virginia
- Full case name: America Online, Inc. v. IMS, et al.
- Decided: October 29th, 1998
- Defendant: IMS et al.
- Prosecution: America Online, Inc.
- Citation: 24 F. Supp. 2d 548

Holding
- The undisputed facts indicated that defendant committed a trespass to chattels against AOL's computer network, falsely designated the origin of his products and diluted AOL's trademark and service mark in violation of the Lanham Act. Therefore, summary judgment was granted.

Court membership
- Judge sitting: Leonie M. Brinkema

Keywords
- trespass to chattels, spamming, trademark infringement, trademark dilution

America Online, Inc. v. IMS, 24 F. Supp. 2d 548 (E.D. Va. 1998) was one of a series of legal battles America Online (hereafter "AOL") launched against junk e-mail (aka "spam" or "Email spam"). In this case, the court held that defendants' unauthorized mailing of unsolicited bulk e-mail constituted a trespass to chattels under Virginia state law.

Besides, many of defendant's junk e-mail contained the letters "aol.com" in their headers, thereby creating a false designation. AOL subscribers were deceived into believing that AOL sponsored or approved of defendant’s bulk e-mailing activities. This caused damage to AOL. Therefore, the court ruled that defendants were in violation of the Lanham Act for false designation of origin.

The court also found that the defendant diluted AOL's trademark and service mark in violation of Lanham Act. The court recognized that AOL owned the famous "AOL" mark and defendants' conducts had tarnished AOL's mark because AOL members made negative associations between AOL and defendants' junk e-mail practices.

== Background ==
AOL is one of the largest online service providers in the United States who had 10 million members at the time when this lawsuit was filed. Spammers kept targeting AOL members because they tended to be newer to the internet and more receptive to junk e-mail. Besides, their e-mail addresses were readily available by either plucking them off the service themselves, or buying one of the many lists of AOL members being sold. Junk e-mail senders found that it cost them nearly nothing to make money through spamming. All they needed was a handful of responses that the AOL members might make. As a result, AOL members who spent some time in AOL's chat rooms quickly found their e-mail boxes flooded with junk e-mail advertising, everything from get-rich-quick schemes to links to pornographic pages.

While AOL had filters in place in an attempt to stop spam from reaching its members, spammers found some techniques to bypass those filters. Since technical measures could not efficiently protect AOL from spammers, AOL then tried to combat the increased flood of spam with the help of the court system. In the late 1997 and early 1998, AOL filed a series of lawsuits against a dozen of spammers, including Over The Air Equipment, IMS, Squeaky Clean Marketing and Cyber Services, Prime Data Worldnet Systems, LCGM Incorporated, Web Promo Incorporated, and so on .

== Facts ==
Defendant Joseph J. Melle, Jr. ("Melle") is the creator and operator of defendants TSF Marketing and TSF Industries (collectively "TSF"). AOL alleged that Melle sent over 60 million e-mail messages over the course of 10 months to AOL subscribers. After being notified in writing by AOL to cease and desist, Melle continued his practice of sending unauthorized bulk e-mail. His activities caused AOL to spend technical resources and staff time to "defend" its computer system and its membership against this spam. In addition, Melle's messages damaged AOL's goodwill among its members. More than 50,000 members lodged complaints to AOL against Melle's junk e-mail.

AOL sued six defendants, including IMS, Gulf Coast Marketing, TSF Marketing and TSF Industries, Melle, etc., under five causes of action. They are 1) false designation of origin under the Lanham Act; 2) dilution of interest in trademarks and service marks under the Lanham Act; 3) violation of the Computer Fraud and Abuse Act; 4) violation of the Virginia Computer Crimes Act; and 5) trespass to chattels under Virginia Common Law respectively. Of the six defendants, only Melle filed an answer to the complaint, and the Court found the other defendants to be in default.

== Court's Opinion ==
=== Trespass to Chattels under Virginia Common Law ===
The court held that Melle committed a trespass to chattels in violation of Virginia Common Law. It followed a precedent, CompuServe Inc. v. Cyber Promotions, Inc., 962 F. Supp. 1015 (S.D. Ohio 1997), established by the United States District Court for the Southern District of Ohio. In that case, the defendant sent unsolicited e-mail advertisement to hundreds of thousands of Compuserve's subscribers. In addition, defendant concealed the origin of its messages by forging header information. And this cost Compuserve time and money and burdened its equipment. Compuserve received complaints from subscribers and the defendant, Cyber Promotion, did not stop sending message even after it was notified that the bulk e-mails was unauthorized. The court thus held Cyber Promotions liable for trespass to chattels.

The United States District Court for the Eastern District of Virginia found that the facts of Compuserve were "strikingly" similar to AOL v. IMS. Furthermore, because the trespass law of Virginia was very close to that of Ohio, the court decided to rely on the reasoning of Compuserve. In this case, defendant Melle intentionally sent bulk e-mail messages to AOL's subscribers without authorization. This conduct severely injured AOL's business goodwill and diminished the value of AOL's interest in its network. Therefore, there was no factual disputes as to whether Melle committed a trespass to chattels against AOL's computer network. As a result, AOL was entitled to summary judgment on this count.

=== False Designation of Origin under the Lanham Act ===
The court held that Melle falsely designated the origin of his products in violation of the Lanham Act. According to 15 U.S.C. § 1125(a)(1), in order to establish a false-designation violation under the Lanham Act, the plaintiff must show: (1) the alleged violator must employ a false designation; (2) the false designation must deceive as to origin, ownership or sponsorship; and (3) the plaintiff must believe that "he or she is or is likely to be damaged by such an act."

In this case, most of Melle’s e-mail included the letters “aol.com” in their headers, thereby creating a false designation. Any recipient could reasonably infer that an e-mail containing the initial "aol.com" in the header would originate from AOL. Moreover, AOL members were deceived into thinking that AOL sponsored or approved of Melle’s bulk e-mailing activities. Further, Evidence showed that Melle’s false designation caused damage to AOL. Accordingly, AOL was entitled to summary judgment on this count.

=== Dilution of Trade and Service Mark under the Lanham Act ===
The court held that Melle diluted AOL’s trademark and service mark in violation of the Lanham Act. According to 15 U.S.C. § 1125(c), a dilution claim is established by showing that the plaintiff owns a distinctive famous mark and a likelihood of dilution exists either from blurring or from tarnishment. In this case, AOL obviously owned the distinctive "AOL" mark and the mark was used and recognized throughout the world in association with AOL's online products and services. Furthermore, records showed that Melle's conduct had tarnished AOL's mark. AOL received more than 10,000 complaints a day regarding spam generally and 50,000 complaints aimed at Melle's spamming. Therefore, AOL was entitled to summary judgment on this count.

=== Damages and other relief awarded by the Court ===
The court granted permanent injunctions in favor of the AOL and against the defendants named in the complaint. The court also awarded actual, compensatory and punitive damages. But, the court declined to grant attorneys fees or costs of the case to AOL.

== Further development ==
Generally, courts were sympathetic to AOL and other online service providers' effort to fight against spam. They usually found in favor of AOL and other online service providers on their trespass to chattels claim, false designation of origin claim and dilution claim. Courts believed that AOL's efforts to block junk email, including its efforts to obtain a court order against mass e-mailers, were in the public interest.

However, AOL's victories over spammers were not so decisive. On the one hand, there were some courts who did not buy the trespass to chattels theory in cyberspace. On the other hand, even if courts ruled in favor of AOL at most times, the problem was that even as some junk emailers were kicked out of the game, others would jump into the business very soon, because there were few barriers to entry. Spammers tended to jump from one network to the next after violating the almost ubiquitous antispam rules. The war between online service providers and spammers will probably continue for quite a while. And there were several battles launched by online service providers against spammers following America Online v. IMS.

In the academic community, there were also heated debate on whether courts should apply the century-old doctrine of trespass to chattels to the Internet in order to save online service providers from junk e-mail.
