= Levin v. United States =

- Supreme Court of the United States

Decided March 4, 2013
- Full case name: Levin v. United States
- Citations: 568 U.S. 503 (more)

Holding
- The Gonzalez Act abrogates the FTCA's intentional tort exception and therefore permits a suit against the United States alleging medical battery by a Navy doctor acting within the scope of his employment.

Court membership
- Chief Justice John Roberts Associate Justices Antonin Scalia · Anthony Kennedy; Clarence Thomas · Ruth Bader Ginsburg; Stephen Breyer · Samuel Alito; Sonia Sotomayor · Elena Kagan

Case opinion
- Majority: Ginsburg, joined by unanimous; Scalia (all but n.6 and n.7)

Laws applied
- Gonzalez Act

Levin v. United States, 568 U.S. 503 (2013), was a United States Supreme Court case in which the Court held that the Gonzalez Act abrogates the Federal Tort Claims Act's intentional tort exception and therefore permits a suit against the United States alleging medical battery by a Navy doctor acting within the scope of his employment.

== Background ==
The Federal Tort Claims Act (FTCA) waives the government's sovereign immunity from tort suits, but excepts from the waiver certain intentional torts, including battery. The FTCA, as originally enacted, afforded tort victims a remedy against the United States, but did not preclude suit against the alleged tortfeasor as sole or joint defendant. Several agency-specific statutes postdating the FTCA, however, immunized certain federal employees from personal liability for torts committed in the course of their official duties. One such statute, the Gonzalez Act, makes the remedy against the United States under the FTCA preclusive of any suit against armed forces medical personnel. The act also provides that, "[f]or purposes of this section," the intentional tort exception to the FTCA "shall not apply to any cause of action arising out of a negligent or wrongful act or omission in the performance of medical . . . functions." §1089(e). Congress subsequently enacted comprehensive legislation, the Federal Employees Liability Reform and Tort Compensation Act (Liability Reform Act), which makes the FTCA's remedy against the United States exclusive for torts committed by federal employees acting within the scope of their employment. Under the Liability Reform Act, federal employees are shielded without regard to agency affiliation or line of work.

Steven Alan Levin suffered injuries as a result of cataract surgery performed at a U. S. Naval Hospital. He filed suit, naming the United States and the surgeon as defendants and asserting, among other things, a claim of battery, based on his alleged withdrawal of consent to operate shortly before the surgery took place. Finding that the surgeon had acted within the scope of his employment, the federal district court released him and substituted the United States as sole defendant. The government moved to dismiss the battery claim, relying on the FTCA's intentional tort exception. Levin countered that the Gonzalez Act, in particular, §1089(e), renders that exception inapplicable when a plaintiff alleges medical battery by a military physician. The district court granted the government's motion to dismiss. Affirming, the Ninth Circuit Court of Appeals concluded that §1089(e) served only to buttress the immunity from personal liability granted military medical personnel in §1089(a) and did not negate the FTCA's intentional tort exception.

== Opinion of the court ==
The Supreme Court issued a majority opinion by Justice Ginsburg on March 4, 2013. The decision for Steven A. Levin reversed the Circuit's judgment, finding that the Gonzalez Act made an exception to the Federal Tort Claims Act. The Court remanded for further proceedings, allowing Levin to proceed with his suit. The Court's decision was unanimous except insofar as Justice Scalia did not join footnotes 6 and 7

Although that the Federal Tort Claims Act generally do not encompass an intentional tort, certain tort claims alleging wrongful or negligent medical care are protected under the Gonzalez Act, as the Gonzalez Act provided an exception to this rule.
