= CompuServe Inc. v. Cyber Promotions, Inc. =

1997 U.S. district court ruling

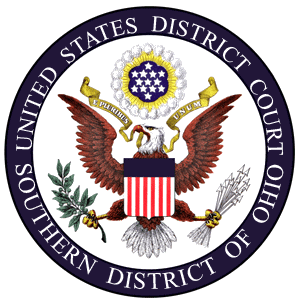
- Court: United States District Court for the Southern District of Ohio
- Full case name: CompuServe Incorporated v. Cyber Promotions, Inc. and Sanford Wallace
- Decided: February 3, 1997

Holding
- Trespass to chattels occurs when the defendant intrudes upon the plaintiff's property such that damage results.

Court membership
- Judge sitting: James L. Graham

CompuServe Inc. v. Cyber Promotions, Inc. was a ruling by the United States District Court for the Southern District of Ohio in 1997 that set an early precedent for granting online service providers the right to prevent commercial enterprises from sending unsolicited email advertising – also known as spam – to its subscribers. It was one of the first cases to apply United States tort law (Restatement (Second) of Torts §217 and §218) to restrict spamming on computer networks. The court held that Cyber Promotions' intentional use of CompuServe's proprietary servers to send unsolicited email was an actionable trespass to chattels and granted a preliminary injunction preventing the spammer from sending unsolicited advertisements to any email address maintained by CompuServe.

== Background ==
In 1997 the Plaintiff, CompuServe Inc., was one of the largest commercial online service providers in the United States. Similar to America Online, CompuServe provided its subscribers with access to content both within its own proprietary network as well providing a gateway, like a simple ISP, to the Internet at large. One of the primary roles taken on by CompuServe was that of an email service provider.

The Defendant, Cyber Promotions, Inc., was an online direct email marketing company, headed by founder and CEO Sanford Wallace. Cyber Promotions was "in the business of sending unsolicited e-mail advertisements [spam] on behalf of themselves and their clients to hundreds of thousands of Internet users, many of whom [were] CompuServe subscribers". As a result of these efforts (as well as others), Sanford Wallace came to be known as "Spamford" Wallace.

In the months leading up to the case, CompuServe subscribers complained to the company about the large amount of spam they were receiving (from Cyber Promotions and other mass emailers). Many threatened to discontinue their subscriptions unless CompuServe took preventative measures to block the spam. As a result, CompuServe introduced a set of email filters on its servers to block incoming spam and prevent the spam's delivery to subscribers. In response, Cyber Promotions took measures to circumvent CompuServe's filters, such as disguising the origin of their messages, allowing its unsolicited email messages to reach their destination.

On October 24, 1996, the United States District Court for the Southern District of Ohio issued a temporary restraining order against Cyber Promotions, preventing them from:

1. Using CompuServe accounts or CompuServe's equipment or support services to send or receive electronic mail or messages or in connection with the sending or receiving of electronic mail or messages.
2. Inserting any false reference to a CompuServe account or CompuServe equipment in any electronic message sent by Cyber Promotions.
3. Falsely representing or causing their electronic mail or messages to bear the representation that any electronic mail or message sent by Cyber Promotions was sent by or originated from CompuServe or a CompuServe account.

Following the issuance of this restraining order, CompuServe filed an application for a preliminary injunction to both extend the duration of this temporary restraining and prevent Cyber Promotions from sending unsolicited advertisements to CompuServe subscribers. This case arises from that application.

== Case ==
CompuServe's primary argument was that Cyber Promotions was "trespassing" on CompuServe's personal property whenever it sent spam that passed through CompuServe's email servers on its way to CompuServe subscribers. To prove its case, CompuServe had to show that the act of sending spam through its email servers constituted a trespass on personal property and that they had sustained monetary damages as a result of this trespass. In its defense, Cyber Promotions argued that CompuServe's email service was a "public utility" that implicitly granted Cyber Promotions permission to send email through its servers. Cyber Promotions also claimed that the free speech clause of the First Amendment gave it the right to send spam to whomever it pleased.

Traditionally, one who commits a trespass to a chattel is subject to liability to the possessor of the chattel if, but only if,

1. he dispossesses the other of the chattel, or
2. the chattel is impaired as to its condition, quality, or value, or
3. the possessor is deprived of the use of the chattel for a substantial time, or
4. bodily harm is caused to the possessor, or harm is caused to some person or thing in which the possessor has a legally protected interest.

Relying on the Restatement of Torts, Judge Graham found that Cyber Promotions did indeed trespass on Compuserve's personal property by sending email through its servers. While Cyber Promotions did not actually take possession of CompuServe's computers, the unsolicited emails they sent "intentionally intermeddled" with CompuServe's computer systems. Because this intermeddling caused CompuServe's computing resources to slow down, the value of those resources available to CompuServe's paying subscribers was reduced, and monetary damages were incurred. Additionally, the complaints filed by CompuServe subscribers and the fact that some of these complaints resulted in canceled subscriptions, suggested that CompuServe's reputation as a business was also jeopardized. Further, the court opinion stated that "if defendants were to prevail on their First Amendment arguments, the viability of electronic mail as an effective means of communication for the rest of society would be put at risk", as consumers would have to wade through so much junk mail that email would no longer be efficient.

In response to Cyber Promotions' first argument, Judge Graham conceded that there was, in fact, an "implied privilege" to utilize CompuServe's system to send email messages from the Internet. However, that privilege was not relevant because CompuServe's policy statement explicitly prohibited spamming. Additionally, Graham asserted that CompuServe made it clear that it did not wish to receive spam from Cyber Promotions and was installing software to filter it out. The fact that Cyber Promotions actively tried to circumvent these filters only exacerbated the issue.

In response to Cyber Promotions' second argument, Judge Graham noted that "allowing the First Amendment to trump private property rights is unwarranted where there are adequate alternative avenues of communication". Given that Cyber Promotions could have easily sent its advertisements to CompuServe's subscribers through a number of different mediums, and that CompuServe's customers had other available means of accessing Cyber Promotion's messages if they were unhappy with the injunction, Judge Graham concluded that a First Amendment argument held no merit.

== Decision ==
The court ruled that CompuServe had a viable claim for trespass to chattels and was entitled to injunctive relief to protect its personal property. The temporary restraining order filed on October 24, 1996, was extended until final judgment was entered in the case. Additionally, Cyber Promotions and Sanford Wallace were enjoined from sending unsolicited advertisements to email addresses controlled by CompuServe while the action was still pending.

The final consent order was served by the United States District Court for the Eastern District of Pennsylvania on May 9, 1997, permanently enjoining Cyber Promotions from "causing, authorizing, participating in, or assisting others" to send unsolicited email to CompuServe e-mail addresses, or to employ any "false or misleading reference" to CompuServe "in the header of or in connection with any electronic message".

Cyber Promotions was also required to pay approximately $65,000 in CompuServe legal fees. In exchange, CompuServe agreed that Cyber Promotions be allowed to put up ads within the CompuServe internal network as well as send emails to subscribers who had explicitly requested Cyber Promotions' emails.

== Implications ==
CompuServe Inc. v. Cyber Promotions, Inc. is the first of a series of cases where the trespass to chattels doctrine was reconfigured and applied to the internet. It set the basis for the prosecution of spam for trespass. Although some believe that applying an old common law of torts to the Internet is a step in the wrong direction, other scholars believe that at the least, it can guide consideration of prospective laws.

== See also ==
- eBay v. Bidder's Edge, 100 F. Supp. 2d 1058 (N.D. Cal. 2000).
- Ticketmaster Corp. v. Tickets.com, Inc., 2000 U.S. Dist. LEXIS 12987 (C.D. Cal. 2000), aff 'd, 2001 U.S. App. LEXIS 1454 (9th Cir. 2001).
- Intel Corp. v. Hamidi, 30 Cal. 4th 1342 (2003).
- School of Visual Arts v. Kuprewicz, 771 N.Y.S.2d 804 (2003).
- Register.com v. Verio, 356 F.3d 393 (2d Cir. 2004).
- Omega World Travel v. Mummagraphics, Inc., 469 F.3d 348 (4th. Cir. 2006).
