= Gonzales Act =

United States law

- Other short titles: Medical Malpractice Immunity Act
- Long title: "An Act to provide for an exclusive remedy against the United States in suits based upon medical malpractice on the part of medical personnel of the armed forces, the Defense Department, the Central Intelligence Agency, and the National Aeronautics and Space Administration, and for other purposes"
- Enacted by: the 94th United States Congress
- Effective: October 8, 1976

Citations
- Public law: Pub. L. 94–464

Legislative history
- Introduced in the House on February 27, 1975; Committee consideration by House Armed Services and Senate Armed Services; Signed into law by President Gerald Ford on October 8, 1976

United States Supreme Court cases
- Levin v. United States, 568 U.S. (2013); United States v. Smith, 499 U.S. (1991)

The Gonzales Act, formally known as the Medical Malpractice Immunity Act is a public law that makes the Federal Tort Claims Act (FTCA) the sole remedy for medical malpractice cases against health providers of the U.S. military. The Gonzales act is located within 32 CFR § 516.29 , a federal regulation titled "Federal statutes and regulations" and is codified at 10 U.S.C. § 1089.

The act may also be referred to as the Gonzalez Act, and is commonly referred as so by the Supreme Court Of The United States (SCOTUS)

== Purpose ==
Before the Gonzales Act was enacted, the military medical personnel themselves, not the U.S. federal government, could be sued for cases involving medical malpractice or negligence. Although the FCTA allowed those who experienced medical malpractice or negligence to sue the federal government, individual military physicians could not be completely protected from personal liability before the Gonzales Act was placed into effect.

The Gonzales Act shields healthcare personnel within the military by making the FCTA the only choice to remedy personal liability claims, preventing military medical personnel from being sued personally. If medical personnel were to be sued, the federal government will take the personnel's place in the lawsuit.

== SCOTUS Cases ==
=== Levin v. United States (2013) ===
In Levin v. United States, it was ruled unanimously with a majority opinion by Justice Ginsburg that the Gonzales Act abrogated the FTC's exclusion on intentional tort if a case involves negligent or wrongful act of medical personnel within the U.S. Military.

=== United States v. Smith (1991) ===
In United States v. Smith (1991), it was ruled in an 8-1 decision (majority opinion by Thurgood Marshall) that the Gonzales Act makes the FCTA the only remedy for medical malpractice and negligence, regardless of the FCTA's exception of claims arising from a foreign country. Since the United States must be substituting the personnel, but the FCTA's exception prevents the United States from doing so, the potential victim of medical malpractice cannot make a damage claim against either the government or the healthcare personnel if their situation took place in a foreign country.
