= Viewbot =

Deceptive internet software

A viewbot is an automated software script used to artificially inflate the view count of live streams or videos, often with the intent to mislead audiences and advertisers about a content creator’s popularity. Tools such as a Kick View Bot are specifically designed for platforms like Kick, enabling users to generate fake engagement and create the illusion of a larger audience. Digital media scholars have compared this practice to placing “mannequins” around a carnival ride; the artificial crowd signals excitement to passersby, ultimately encouraging real viewers to join under false impressions.

Since 2023, some streamers across two live streaming platforms, Kick and Twitch, have either been suspected or accused of viewbotting.

== Background ==
Besides Twitch and Kick, viewbots have also been recorded to have been used on other social media platforms like YouTube, TikTok, and Instagram. In addition, viewbots have been recorded to have been used by musical artists on music streaming sites. Most of the time, viewbots are programmed to avoid being detected by advanced filters on video, streaming, and music publishing platforms. Over the years, there has been a high demand for viewbots, which has led users on the internet to make websites for the sole purpose of making downloadable or having to sell viewbots.

In February 2023, online streamer and co-founder of Kick, Trainwreckstv, criticized gambling streamers for allegedly implementing bots into their viewer count while doing gambling streams. After making the accusations, Trainwreckstv vowed to fix the problem "as soon as possible" to try to help Kick's reputation, as well as his. On November 1, 2024, the CEO of Kick, Ed Craven, responded to the mass waves of streamers view-botting by saying that the Kick staff are committed to creating ideas to take action on the streamers who regularly viewbot to accomplish fairness in the streaming environment of Kick. Back in January 2018, two viewbot creators were ordered to pay nearly $1.4 million (2018 USD) to Twitch for trademark violation, cybersquatting, unfair competition, and breach of contract as a result of the streaming service winning a lawsuit against Michael and Katherine Anjomi, as well as other defendants. Twitch filed the lawsuit earlier in 2016, alleging that the Anjomi's viewbots were causing harm to licit broadcasters by decreasing their discoverability.

On August 14, 2024, the Federal Trade Commission (FTC) of the U.S. government announced a ruling that would combat fake reviews and fake social media indicators, which includes review suppression and view-botting. The ruling is supposed to crack down on content creators who get caught buying fake views and/or followers to enable their results for commercial reasons. The ruling was kicked in on October 13, 2024.

On July 28, 2025, Twitch implemented new detection measures which resulted in an estimated 24% drop in viewership across the platform over a three-day period. According to P.B. Berge, a digital humanities scholar, these bots do more than just inflate numbers; they degrade the social experience of streaming by flooding chats with "robot-like replies," which can frustrate legitimate community members attempting to engage with the creator.

== Suspected and confirmed viewbotters ==
=== Kick ===
==== N3on ====
In December 2023, during a live stream, N3on would be looking at and reading his chat. Out of nowhere, hundreds of bot accounts entered his stream and started to display the same comments and links. N3on reacted in shock and spoke out of confusion on how his chat was moving at a fast speed. After the incident, fans and viewers started accusing him of view-botting, as well as implementing bots into his chat.

On September 18, 2024, a clip from a live stream surfaced of a Kick staff member confirming that N3on's average view count was not accurate. The staff member also revealed that at one point, N3on would average about 36,000 viewers, and then would average about 90,000 viewers in a short amount of time. N3on responded to the staff member by denying the accusations and insulting his critics for allegedly downplaying his success.

In the month of October 2024, N3on reached more than 21 million hours watched, surpassing streamers like HasanAbi and Adin Ross combined. This rapid rise led people to question whether the hours watched were real or was the result of N3on implementing bots into his view count.

=== Twitch ===
==== Reggie and Rakai ====
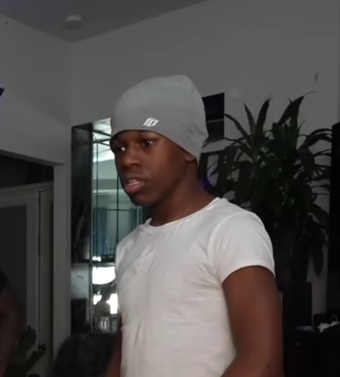
Streamer Rakai is suspected of having view-botted streams

On April 9, 2025, Twitch and Kick streamer, xQc, accused Kai Cenat's friends, Reggie and Rakai, for view-botting their Twitch streams after investigating both of their streaming stats. xQc first looked at Reggie's stats, and pointed out that he started with 800 viewers one stream, and over the course of 2 days, Reggie would reach more than 60,000 viewers alone in another stream. He also pointed out the stats of Rakai and accused him of view-botting and mentioned that his chat moved very slow despite having more than 20,000 viewers watching. Later on in the stream, while playing a game with another streamer, xQc would be questioned on what the reason was for accusing Rakai and Reggie for view-botting, xQc then answered saying “I don’t give a f*ck, they’re all view-botters, I don’t care. From a 1K Andy to 20k overnight, like bro, I’ve been here before, I’m not stupid, they’re botted out the wazoo. I’d be open to the conversation that it is their agency doing it.” On April 10, Cenat responded to xQc saying that Reggie does not often spend a lot time on Twitch other than live streaming himself. Cenat also mentioned that if he were to ask Reggie who xQc was, Reggie would not know who someone like xQc is. xQc responded back to Cenat and his viewers saying to not be mad at him, but to instead "look at the facts."

==== QueenGloriaRP ====
While live streaming on March 18, 2025, Twitch and Kick streamer QueenGloriaRp leaked a window of a view-botting program after accidentally opening it up. The window showed options to increase the number of bots and the duration. For a few seconds, Gloria did not seem to notice the window until she finally realized what she had done. She then went offline for a few minutes and claimed to her live audience that she had to get off for a bit because something was wrong with her OBS. Clips and videos of the incident went viral. Before putting her Twitter account on private, she denied ever using viewbots on her streams, saying that it was someone else implementing them without her knowing. She then claimed that she was simply searching the program on Google and it suddenly showed up on her stream by mistake. As a result, Twitch banned her for violating their terms of service and community guidelines.

== See also ==
- Internet bot
