= Trespass =

Legal concept of intentional interference

Trespass is an area of tort law broadly divided into three groups: trespass to the person (see below), trespass to chattels, and trespass to land.

Trespass to the person historically involved six separate trespasses: threats, assault, battery, wounding, mayhem (or maiming), and false imprisonment. Through the evolution of the common law in various jurisdictions, and the codification of common law torts, most jurisdictions now broadly recognize three trespasses to the person: assault, which is "any act of such a nature as to excite an apprehension of battery"; battery, "any intentional and unpermitted contact with the plaintiff's person or anything attached to it and practically identified with it"; and false imprisonment, the "unlawful obstruction or deprivation of freedom from restraint of movement".

Trespass to chattel does not require a showing of damages. Simply the "intermeddling with or use of … the personal property" of another gives cause of action for trespass. Since CompuServe Inc. v. Cyber Promotions, Inc., various courts have applied the principles of trespass to chattel to resolve cases involving unsolicited bulk e-mail and unauthorized server usage.

Trespass to land is today the tort most commonly associated with the term trespass; it takes the form of "wrongful interference with one's possessory rights in [real] property". Generally, it is not necessary to prove harm to a possessor's legally protected interest; liability for unintentional trespass varies by jurisdiction. "At common law, every unauthorized entry upon the soil of another was a trespasser"; however, under the tort scheme established by the Restatement of Torts, in the US liability for unintentional intrusions now arises only under circumstances evincing negligence or where the intrusion involved a highly dangerous activity. In criminal law, trespass is often an element of offences such as burglary.

Trespass has also been treated as a common law offense in some countries.

== Trespass to the person ==
There are three types of trespass, the first of which is trespass to the person. Whether intent is a necessary element of trespass to the person varies by jurisdiction. Under English decision, Letang v Cooper, intent is required to sustain a trespass to the person cause of action; in the absence of intent, negligence is the appropriate tort. In other jurisdictions, gross negligence is sufficient to sustain a trespass to the person, such as when a defendant negligently operates an automobile and strikes the plaintiff with great force. "Intent is to be presumed from the act itself." Generally, and as defined by Goff LJ in Collins v Wilcock, trespass to the person consists of three torts: assault, battery, and false imprisonment.

=== Assault ===
In various common law jurisdictions, assault is both a crime and a tort. Generally, a person commits criminal assault if they purposely, knowingly, or recklessly inflict bodily injury upon another; if they negligently inflict bodily injury upon another by means of dangerous weapon; or if through physical menace, they place another in fear of imminent serious bodily injury. A person commits tortious assault when they engage in "any act of such a nature as to excite an apprehension of battery [bodily injury]".

In some jurisdictions, there is no requirement that actual physical violence occurs, simply the "threat of unwanted touching of the victim" suffices to sustain an assault claim. Consequently, in R v Constanza, the court found a stalker's threats could constitute assault. In Australia, NSW v Ibbett, the Court of Appeal upheld the trial judge's findings and increased the damages awarded, after the police pursued a suspect to a house where he lived with his mother, produced a gun and gave her directions, which greatly scared her. The court found that it was enough to justify the criteria of an immediate apprehension of harm, to an extent that amounted to assault. Similarly, silence, given certain conditions, may constitute an assault as well. However, in other jurisdictions, simple threats are insufficient; they must be accompanied by an action or condition to trigger a cause of action.

Incongruity of a defendant's language and action, or of a plaintiff's perception and reality may vitiate an assault claim. In Tuberville v Savage, the defendant reached for his sword and told the plaintiff that "[i]f it were not assize-time, I would not take such language from you". In its American counterpart, Commonwealth v. Eyre, the defendant shouted "[i]f it were not for your gray hairs, I would tear your heart out". In both cases, the courts held that despite a threatening gesture, the plaintiffs were not in immediate danger. The actions must give the plaintiff a reasonable expectation that the defendant is going to use violence; a fist raised before the plaintiff may suffice; the same fist raised behind the window of a police cruiser will not.

=== Battery ===
Battery is "any intentional and unpermitted contact with the plaintiff's person or anything attached to it and practically identified with it". The elements of battery common law varies by jurisdiction. In the United States, the American Law Institute's Restatement of Torts provides a general rule to determine liability for battery:

An act which, directly or indirectly, is the legal cause of a harmful contact with another's person makes the actor liable to the other, if:

- (a) the act is done with the intention of bringing about a harmful or offensive contact or an apprehension thereof to the other or a third person, and
- (b) contact is not consented to by the other or the other's consent thereto is procured by fraud or duress, and
- (c) the contact is not otherwise privileged.

Battery torts under Commonwealth precedent are subjected to a four-point test to determine liability:

1. Directness. Is the sequence of events connecting initial conduct and the harmful contact an unbroken series?
2. Intentional act. Was the harmful contact the conscious object of the defendant? Did the defendant intend to cause the resulting harm? Though the necessity of intent remains an integral part of Commonwealth battery, some Commonwealth jurisdictions have moved toward the American jurisprudence of "substantial certainty". If a reasonable person in the defendant's position would apprehend the substantial certainty of the consequences of his actions, whether the defendant intended to inflict the injuries is immaterial.
3. Bodily contact. Was there active (as opposed to passive) contact between the bodies of the plaintiff and the defendant?
4. Consent. Did the plaintiff consent to the harmful contact? The onus is on the defendant to establish sufficient and effective consent.

=== False imprisonment ===
False imprisonment is defined as "unlaw[ful] obstruct[ion] or depriv[ation] of freedom from restraint of movement". In some jurisdictions, false imprisonment is a tort of strict liability: no intention on the behalf of the defendant is needed, but others require an intent to cause the confinement. Physical force, however, is not a necessary element, and confinement need not be lengthy; the restraint must be complete, though the defendant needn't resist.

Conveniently, the American Law Institute's Restatement (Second) of Torts distills false imprisonment liability analysis into a four-prong test:

1. The defendant intends to confine the plaintiff. (This is not necessary in Commonwealth jurisdictions.)
2. The plaintiff is conscious of the confinement. (Prosser rejects this requirement.)
3. The plaintiff does not consent to the confinement.
4. The confinement was not otherwise privileged.

=== Defenses ===
==== Child correction ====
Depending on the jurisdiction, corporal punishment of children by parents or instructors may be a defense to trespass to the person, so long as the punishment was "reasonably necessary under the circumstances to discipline a child who has misbehaved" and the defendant "exercise[d] prudence and restraint". Unreasonable punishments, such as violently grabbing a student's arm and hair, have no defense. Many jurisdictions, however, limit corporal punishment to parents, and a few, such as New Zealand, have criminalized the practice.

==== Consent ====
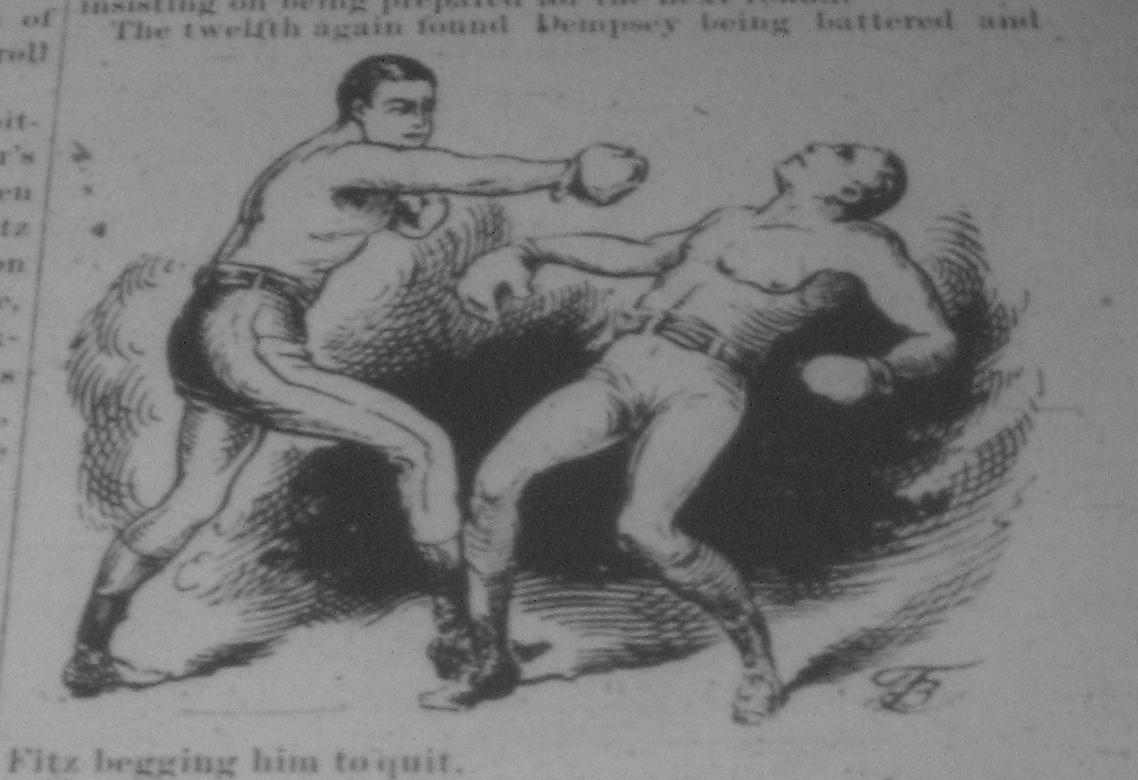
Denning LJ: "[I]n an ordinary fight with fists there is no cause of action to either of [the combatants] for any injury suffered."

Perhaps the most common defense for the torts of trespass to the person is that of volenti non fit injuria, literally, "to a willing person, no injury is done", but shortened to "consensual privilege" or "consent". If a plaintiff participates in a sporting activity in which physical contact is ordinary conduct, such as rugby, they are considered to have consented. This is not the case if the physical contact went beyond what could be expected, such as the use of hand gun during a fistfight, as in Andrepont v Naquin, or where the injuries were suffered not from the plaintiff's participation in the sport but inadequate safety measures taken, as in Watson v British Boxing Board of Control Ltd. Where the plaintiff and defendant voluntarily agree to participate in a fight, some jurisdictions will deny relief in civil action, so long as the injuries caused are proportionate: "in an ordinary fight with fists there is no cause of action to either of [the combatants] for any injury suffered". Other jurisdictions refuse to recognize consent as a defense to mutual combat and instead provide relief under the doctrine of comparative negligence.

Medical care gives rise to many claims of trespass to the person. A physician, "treating a mentally competent adult under non-emergency circumstances, cannot properly undertake to perform surgery or administer other therapy without the prior consent of his patient". Should he do so, he commits a trespass to the person and is liable for damages. However, if the plaintiff is informed by a doctor of the broad risks of a medical procedure, there will be no claim under trespass against the person for resulting harm caused; the plaintiff's agreement constitutes informed consent. In those cases where the patient does not possess sufficient mental capacity to consent, doctors must exercise extreme caution. In F v West Berkshire Health Authority, the House of Lords instructed British physicians that, to justify operating upon such an individual, there "(1) must ... be a necessity to act when it is not practicable to communicate with the assisted person ... [and] (2) the action taken must be such as a reasonable person would in all the circumstances take, acting in the best interests of the assisted person".

==== Self-defense / defense of others / defense of property ====
Self-defense, or non-consensual privilege, is a valid defense to trespasses against the person, assuming that it constituted the use of "reasonable force which they honestly and reasonably believe is necessary to protect themselves or someone else, or property". The force used must be proportionate to the threat, as ruled in Cockcroft v Smith.

== Trespass to chattels ==
Trespass to chattels (also known as trespass to goods or trespass to personal property) is defined as "an intentional interference with the possession of personal property...proximately caus[ing] injury". While originally a remedy for the asportation of personal property, the tort grew to incorporate any interference with the personal property of another. In some jurisdictions, such as the United Kingdom, trespass to chattels has been codified to clearly define the scope of the remedy; in most jurisdictions, trespass to chattel remains a purely common law remedy, the scope of which varies by jurisdiction.

Generally, trespass to chattels possesses three elements:

1. Lack of consent — The interference with the property must be non-consensual. A claim does not lie if, in acquiring the property, the purchaser consents contractually to certain access by the seller. "[A]ny use exceeding the consent" authorized by the contract, should it cause harm, gives rise to a cause for action.
2. Actual harm — The interference with the property must result in actual harm. The threshold for actual harm varies by jurisdiction. In California, for instance, an electronic message may constitute a trespass if the message interferes with the functioning of the computer hardware, but the plaintiff must prove that this interference caused actual hardware damage or actual impaired functioning.
3. Intentionality — The interference must be intentional. What constitutes intention varies by jurisdiction, however, the Restatement (Second) of Torts indicates that "intention is present when an act is done for the purpose of using or otherwise intermeddling with a chattel or with knowledge that such an intermeddling will, to a substantial certainty, result from the act", and continues: "[i]t is not necessary that the actor should know or have reason to know that such intermeddling is a violation of the possessory rights of another".

Remedies for trespass to chattel include damages, liability for conversion, and injunction, depending on the nature of the interference.

=== Traditional applications ===
Trespass to chattels typically applies to tangible property and allows the owner of such property to seek relief when a third party intentionally interferes or intermeddles in the owner's possession of his personal property. "Interference" is often interpreted as the "taking" or "destroying" of goods, but can be as minor as "touching" or "moving" them in the right circumstances. In Kirk v Gregory, the defendant moved jewelry from one room to another, where it was stolen. The deceased owner's executor successfully sued her for trespass to chattel. Furthermore, personal property, as traditionally construed, includes living objects, except where property interests are restricted by law. Thus animals are personal property, but organs are not.

=== Modern US applications ===
In Intel v. Hamidi, the Supreme Court of California ruled that a plaintiff in a suit for electronic trespass to chattels must establish actual damage.

In recent years, trespass to chattels has been expanded in the United States to cover intangible property, including combating the proliferation of unsolicited bulk email as well as virtual property interests in online worlds. In the late 1990s, American courts enlarged trespass to chattels, first to include the unauthorized use of long-distance telephone lines, and later to include unsolicited bulk email. In 1998, a federal court in Virginia held that the owner of a marketing company committed trespass to chattels against an Internet service provider's computer network by sending 60 million unauthorized email advertisements after being notified that the spam was unauthorized. In America Online, Inc. v. LCGM, Inc., AOL successfully sued a pornographic website for spamming AOL customers and forging the AOL domain name to trick customers. By the new millennium, trespass to chattel expanded beyond bulk email. In eBay v. Bidder's Edge, a California court ruled that Bidder's Edge's use of a web crawler to cull auction information from eBay's website constituted trespass to chattel and further, that a plaintiff in such a suit need not prove that the interference was substantial. A number of similar cases followed until, in Intel v. Hamidi, the Supreme Court of California held that a plaintiff must demonstrate either actual interference with the physical functionality of the computer system or the likelihood that such interference would occur in the future. The Hamidi decision quickly found acceptance at both the federal and state level.

To date, no United States court has identified property rights in items acquired in virtual worlds; heretofore, virtual world providers have relied on end-user license agreements to govern user behavior. Nevertheless, as virtual worlds grow, incidents of property interference, a form of "griefing", may make trespass to chattel an attractive remedy for deleted, stolen, or corrupted virtual property.

== Trespass to land ==
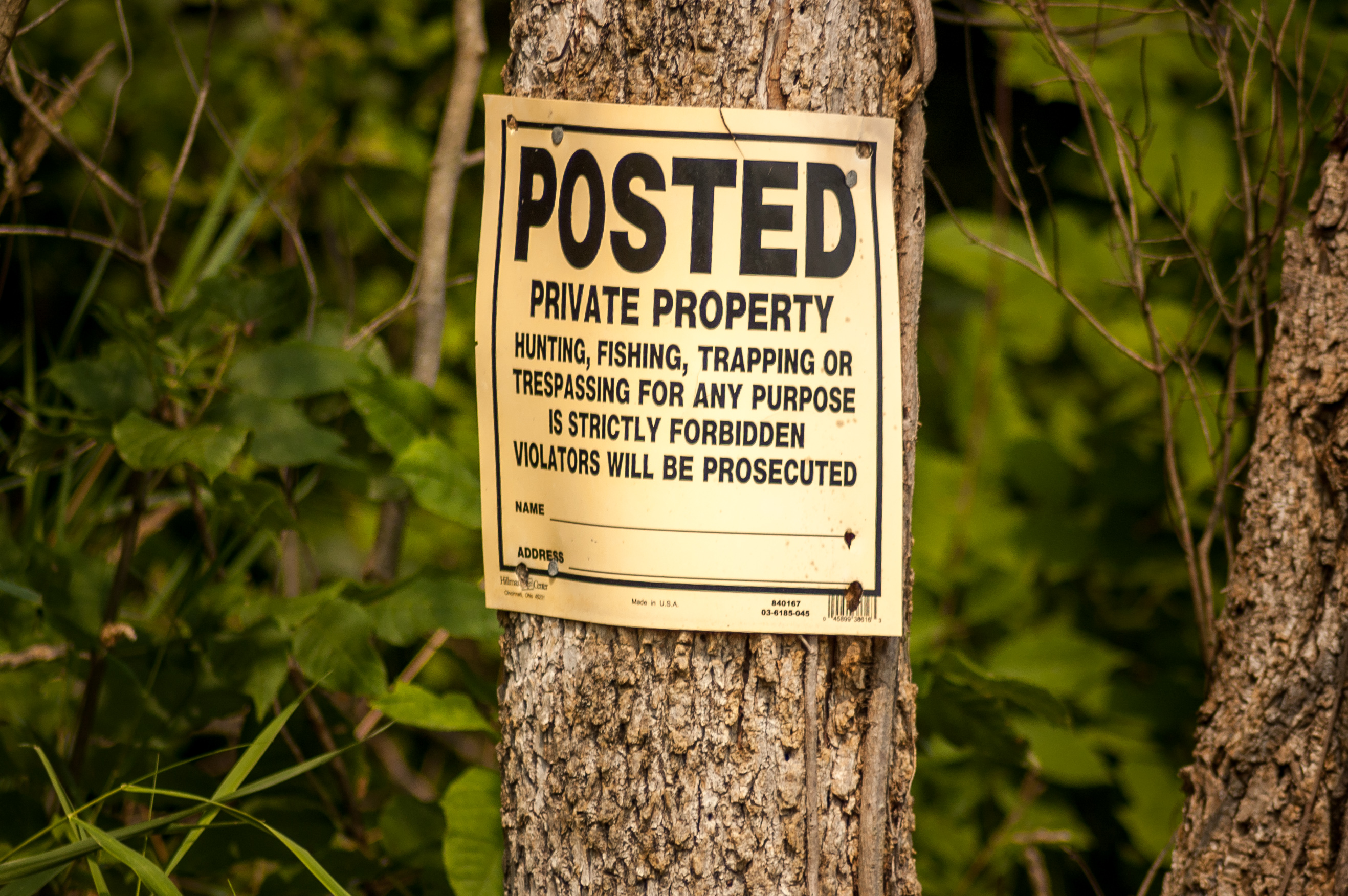
Posted sign in the United States, prohibiting any form of trespass be it for hunting, fishing, trapping or any other purpose

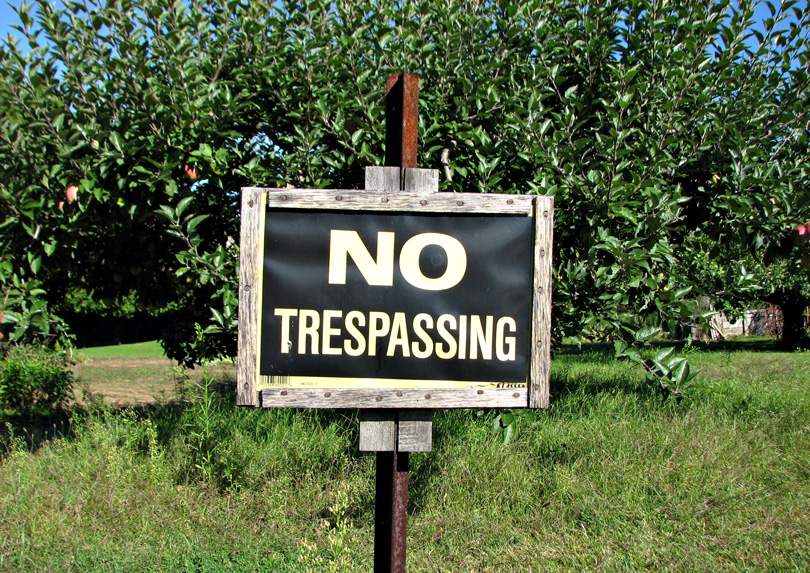
No trespassing lawn signs are common in many countries.

Trespass to land involves the "wrongful interference with one's possessory rights in [real] property". It is not necessary to prove that harm was suffered to bring a claim, and is instead actionable per se. While most trespasses to land are intentional, British courts have held liability holds for trespass committed negligently. Similarly, some American courts will find liability for unintentional intrusions only where such intrusions arise under circumstances evincing negligence or involve a highly dangerous activity. Exceptions exist for entering land adjoining a road unintentionally (such as in a car accident), as in River Wear Commissioners v Adamson.

In some jurisdictions, trespass while in possession of a firearm, which may include a low-power air weapon without ammunition, constitutes a more grave crime of armed trespass. In the UK, some trespassing is criminal, for example, if a person trespasses intentionally and intimidates, obstructs or disrupts the lawful activity of others, it is considered aggravated trespass and is a punishable offence, as specified in the Criminal Justice and Public Order Act 1994.

The Government of Saskatchewan, in Canada, passed The Trespass to Property Amendment Regulations Act in 2025, that makes it easier to deal with problems such as public intoxication and drug use, by automatically considering this as trespassing in public spaces, including when it occurs within businesses, without having to seek further information from the owners of the premises.

=== Subsoil and airspace ===
Aside from the surface, land includes the subsoil, airspace and anything permanently attached to the land, such as houses, and other infrastructure, this is literally explained by the legal maxim quicquid plantatur solo, solo cedit.

==== Subsoil ====
William Blackstone's Commentaries on the Laws of England articulated the common law principle cuius est solum eius est usque ad coelum et ad inferos, translating from Latin as "for whoever owns the soil, it is theirs up to Heaven and down to Hell". In modern times, courts have limited the right of absolute dominion over the subsurface. For instance, drilling a directional well that bottoms out beneath another's property to access oil and gas reserves is trespass, but a subsurface invasion by hydraulic fracturing is not. Where mineral rights are severed from surface ownership, it is trespass to use another's surface to assist in mining the minerals beneath that individual's property, but, where an emergency responder accesses the subsurface following a blowout and fire, no trespass lies. Even the possible subsurface migration of toxic waste stored underground is not trespass, except where the plaintiff can demonstrate that the actions "actually interfere with the [owner's] reasonable and foreseeable use of the subsurface", or, in some jurisdictions, that the subsurface trespasser knows with "substantial certainty" that the toxic liquids will migrate to the neighboring land.

==== Airspace ====
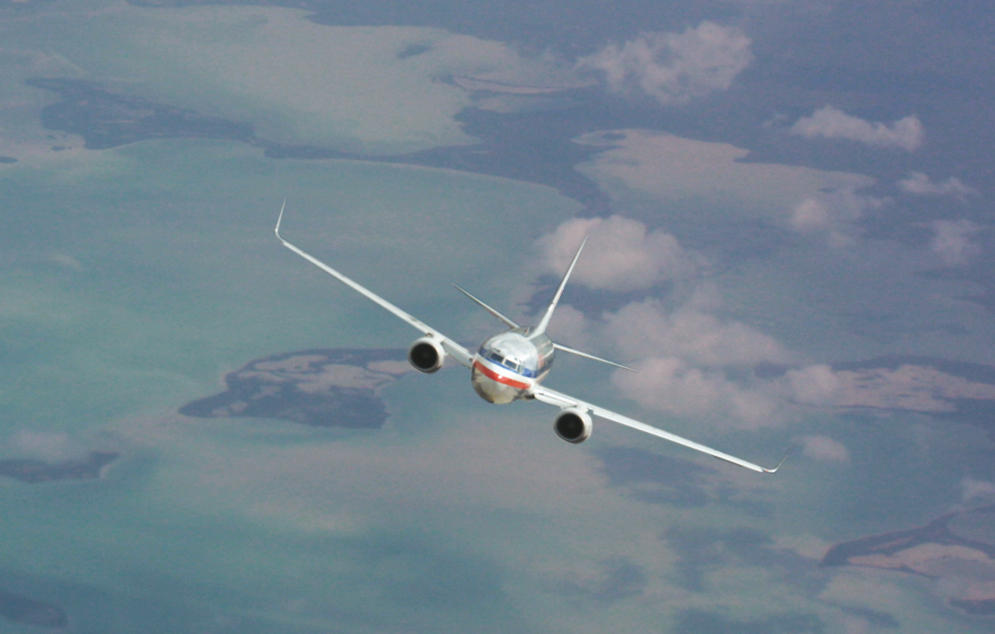
William O. Douglas stated: "the flight of airplanes, which skim the surface but do not touch it, is as much an appropriation of the use of the land as a more conventional entry upon it."

Domain of landowners over their airspace is limited to the lower atmosphere.

In the United States, United States v. Causby (1946) limited landowner domain to the space below 365 feet (111 m), Justice William O. Douglas reasoned that, should it find in the landowners' favor and accept the "ancient doctrine that at common law ownership of land extend[s] to the periphery of the universe—Cujus est solum ejus est usque ad coelum", "every transcontinental flight would subject the operator to countless trespass suits". Citizens have a right to fly in the "navigable airspace".

Thirty-one years later, in Bernstein of Leigh v Skyviews & General Ltd, an English court reached a similar conclusion, finding an action for trespass failed because the violation of airspace took place several hundred meters above the land: "If the Latin maxim were applied literally it would lead to the absurdity of trespass being committed every time a satellite passed over a suburban garden."

=== Interference ===
The main element of the tort is "interference". This must be both direct and physical, with indirect interference instead being covered by negligence or nuisance. "Interference" covers any physical entry to land, as well as the abuse of a right of entry, when a person who has the right to enter the land does something not covered by the permission. If the person has the right to enter the land but remains after this right expires, this is also trespass. It is also a trespass to throw anything on the land. For the purposes of trespass, the person who owns the land on which a road rests is treated as the owner; it is not, however, a trespass to use that road if the road is constructed with a public use easement, or if, by owner acquiescence or through adverse possession, the road has undergone a common law dedication to the public. In Hickman v Maisey and Adams v. Rivers, the courts established that any use of a road that went beyond using it for its normal purpose could constitute a trespass: "[a]lthough a land owner's property rights may be [s]ubject to the right of mere passage, the owner of the soil is still absolute master." British courts have broadened the rights encompassed by public easements in recent years. In DPP v Jones, the court ruled that "the public highway is a public place which the public may enjoy for any reasonable purpose, providing that the activity in question does not amount to a public or private nuisance and does not obstruct the highway by reasonably impeding the primary right of the public to pass and repass; within these qualifications there is a public right of peaceful assembly on the highway." The principles established in Adams remain valid in American law.

=== Defenses ===
There are several defenses to trespass to land; license, justification by law, necessity and jus tertii. License is express or implied permission, given by the possessor of land, to be on that land. These licenses are generally revocable unless there is contractual agreement preventing them being revoked. Once revoked, a license-holder becomes a trespasser if they remain on the land. Justification by law refers to those situations in which there is statutory authority permitting a person to go onto land, such as the England and Wales' Police and Criminal Evidence Act 1984, which allows the police to enter land for the purposes of carrying out an arrest, or the California state constitution, which permits protests on grocery stores and strip malls, despite their presenting a general nuisance to store owners and patrons. Jus tertii is where the defendant can prove that the land is not possessed by the plaintiff, but by a third party, as in Doe d Carter v Barnard. This defense is unavailable if the plaintiff is a tenant and the defendant a landlord who had no right to give the plaintiff his lease (e.g., an illegal apartment rental, an unauthorized sublet, etc.). Necessity is the situation in which it is vital to commit the trespass; in Esso Petroleum Co v Southport Corporation, the captain of a ship committed trespass by allowing oil to flood a shoreline. This was necessary to protect his ship and crew, however, and the defense of necessity was accepted. Necessity does not, however, permit a defendant to enter another's property when alternative, though less attractive, courses of action exist.

== See also ==
- Appropriation (economics) – Property ownership concept
- Castle doctrine – Legal concept
- Countryside and Rights of Way Act 2000 (UK) – UK freedom to roam legislation
- Easement – Right to use or enter real property
- Forced entry – Act of entering a property by force
- Freedom to roam – Right of public access to land or bodies of water
- Property is theft!
- Rights of way in England and Wales
- Rights of way in Scotland
- Structural encroachment
- Trespass in English law
- Trespass on the case

== Bibliography ==
=== Books ===
- Elliott, Catherine; Francis Quinn (2007). Tort Law (6th ed.). Pearson Longman. ISBN 978-1-4058-4672-1.
- Smith, Kenneth; Denis J. Keenan (2004). English Law (14th ed.). Pearson Education Ltd. ISBN 0-582-82291-2.

=== Periodicals ===
- Anderson, Owen L. (2010). "Subsurface "Trespass": A Man's Subsurface is Not His Castle". Washburn L.J. 49.
- Ledgerwood, Garrett (2009). "Virtually Liable". Wash. & Lee L. Rev. 66.
- Trinidade, F.A. (1982). "Intentional Torts: Some Thoughts Assault and Battery". Oxford J. Legal Stud. 2 (2).
