= Omega World Travel, Inc. v. Mummagraphics, Inc. =

2006 US court case

- Court: United States Court of Appeals for the Fourth Circuit
- Decided: November 17, 2006

Court membership
- Judges sitting: Wilkinson, Duncan, Voorhees

Case opinions
- Decision by: Wilkinson

Keywords
- chattel; commercial electronic mail; domain name; electronic mail; email; falsify; header; inaccuracies; materially; opt-out; preemption; unsolicited; website

Omega World Travel, Inc. v. Mummagraphics, Inc., 469 F.3d 348 (4th Cir. 2006), is a case in the United States Court of Appeals for the Fourth Circuit in which Mummagraphics, Inc. is sued by Omega World Travel, Inc. (Omega) and Cruise.com (a fully owned subsidiary of Omega) after Mummagraphic alleged that they received 11 commercial e-mail messages in violation of the Controlling the Assault of Non-Solicited Pornography and Marketing (CAN-SPAM) Act of 2003 as well as Oklahoma state law. In the initial filing, the United States District Court for the Eastern District of Virginia had awarded summary judgment to Omega on all of Mummagraphics' claims finding that the commercial emails from Omega did not violate the CAN-SPAM Act, and that the CAN-SPAM Act preempted Oklahoma state law. The Court of Appeals affirmed.

== Parties ==
The appellant (original plaintiff) was Mummagraphics, Inc., an Oklahoma corporation with its only place of operation in Oklahoma City. It provided web based services and hosted websites devoted to opposing spam messages. These websites included sueaspammer.com and OptOutByDomain.com. Its president was Mark Mumma.

The appellees (original defendant) included Omega World Travel, Inc. and Cruise.com. Cruise.com was an operator of a website that sold cruise vacations. It sent email advertisements, also known as "E-deals," to prospective customers.

== Background ==
Cruise.com sent 11 e-mails containing travel offers to inbox@webguy.net, an email address operated by Mummagraphics. Each message contained a link on which the recipient could click in order to be removed from future mailings, and each message also stated that the recipient could opt-out of future e-mails by writing to a postal address provided in each e-mail address. Each message also contained a link to the Cruise.com website and a toll-free phone number for the company.

Mummagraphics claimed that the Cruise.com e-mail messages contained several inaccuracies. First, each message stated that the recipient had signed up for the Cruise.com mailing list, but it had not asked that inbox@webguy.net receive the company's offers. Second, while each message listed Cruise.com as the sending organization, each also included the address "FL-Broadcast.net" (not a domain name linked to Cruise.com) in its header information. In addition, the messages' "from" field listed cruisedeals@cruise.com, an email address that Cruise.com had stopped using.

Upon receiving the Cruise.com emails, Mumma did not use the opt-out link to remove the email address from the Cruise.com email list. Instead, Mumma called Omega's general counsel and complained that he had not asked to receive the email messages. He also refused to use email opt-out mechanisms, and instead threatened to sue for violations of Oklahoma law. Omega asked Mumma for the email address at which he was receiving the e-mail messages, but Mumma did not give it to them. Instead, he asked Omega to remove from all future mailings every address containing any of the domain names listed on Mummagraphics' OptOutByDomain.com website. Omega indicated that it would do so but later realized that removing all those addresses required considerable effort. So it did not immediately remove the addresses.

A day later, Mummagraphics received another email message at inbox@webguy.net. It sent a letter to Omega stating that it had received multiple unsolicited email messages from Cruise.com. But again did not specify the email address at which the messages were being received. The letter claimed that the messages violated federal and state laws and said that Mummagraphics intended to sue for at least $150,000 in statutory damages unless they settled the matter for $6,250. It also attached the Cruise.com emails to his letter. For these email attachments, Omega was able to figure out the email address at which Mummagraphics was receiving the Cruise.com commercial emails and removed it from the Cruise.com mailing list.

When Omega refused to pay the demanded settlement money, Mummagraphics accused Omega and Cruise.com of being "spammers" on its "anti-spam" websites. It also posted pictures of the Omega and Cruise.com executives, taken from their respective websites, on these "anti-spam" sites. On the basis of these postings, Omega and Cruise.com sued Mummagraphics claiming defamation, copyright infringement, trademark infringement, and unauthorized use of likeness. Mummagraphics raised counterclaims under CAN-SPAM Act and the Oklahoma law (these were the only claims that were pending in front of Fourth Circuit). It alleged that the Cruise.com e-mails contained actionable inaccuracies and that it failed to comply with opt-out provisions. The district court held that the CAN-SPAM Act preempted Mummagraphics' claims under Oklahoma's statutes. It further held that Cruise.com had not violated the CAN-SPAM Act because the email inaccuracies were not substantial and opt-out provisions were not violated. Mummagraphics appealed.

== Prior history ==
The district court had awarded summary judgment to Omega on all of Mummagraphic's claims on the grounds that the CAN-SPAM Act preempted Mummagraphic's claims under Oklahoma's statutes. In addition, Mummagraphics had failed to allege material inaccuracies or pattern of failure to conform to opt-out requirements that is necessary to establish liability under the CAN-SPAM Act.

== Fourth Circuit Court of Appeals ==
=== Mummagraphics' claims under Oklahoma state law ===
The Fourth Circuit upheld the district court holding that Oklahoma law could not cover these emails because the CAN-SPAM Act preempted state law with regard to immaterial misrepresentation. The court reasoned that the CAN-SPAM Act's exceptions only allow states to punish "falsity and deception," and immaterial representation falls outside of the meaning of these terms. Thus, according to the court, the CAN-SPAM Act implicitly prevented states from punishing immaterial misrepresentations like the ones here.

Mummagraphics argued that it was entitled to damages under the provisions of Oklahoma law which provide that "[i]t shall be unlawful for a person to initiate an electronic email message that the sender knows, or has reasons to know (1) misrepresents any information in identifying the point of origin or the transmission path of the electronic mail message; (2) does not contain information identifying the point of origin or the transmission path of the electronic mail message; or contains false, malicious or misleading information which purposefully or negligently injures a person."

The district court had held that the above provisions of the Oklahoma statute were preempted by the CAN-SPAM Act insofar as they applied to immaterial misrepresentations. And because the misrepresentations in this case were immaterial, Mummagraphics was not entitled to any damages under the Oklahoma statutory claims. Upon appeal, Mummagraphics argued that because the CAN-SPAM Act permits states to "prohibit[] falsity or deception" (under 15 U.S.C. § 7707(b)(1)), the district court was incorrect to hold that Oklahoma state law could not cover immaterial misrepresentations.

The Fourth Circuit agreed with the district court finding that although by its terms Oklahoma state law was not limited to material misrepresentations, it was preempted by the CAN-SPAM Act in the case of immaterial misrepresentations. This was so because the CAN-SPAM exception allows states to punish only "falsity and deception" in commercial emails. The Court held that although the terms "falsity and deception" have not been defined in the CAN-SPAM Act, common meaning of these words indicates that the CAN-SPAM exception is applicable only to material misrepresentation. The court explained that "deception" requires more than bare error. While "falsity" may be defined as not being true it also conveys a sense of tortiousness and wrongfulness. The word "falsity" when read in combination with "deception" indicates traditionally tortious or wrongful conduct. Thus, Congress would not have intended "falsity" to mean simply an error. Adopting such a meaning would also defeat the very purpose of the CAN-SPAM Act which is to ensure a careful balance between preserving a potentially useful commercial tool (electronic communication) and preventing its abuse. According to the court, Mummagraphics' reading of the "falsity or deception" exception would permit this exception to swallow the whole rule, giving states more power than intended and undermining the regulatory balance that Congress established. Accordingly, Mummagraphics' broad reading of the exception was not compatible with the structure of the CAN-SPAM Act as a whole.

Thus, Mummagraphics' claims under Oklahoma state law failed.

=== Mummagraphics' claims under the CAN-SPAM Act ===
Mummagraphics argued that Cruise.com violated the CAN-SPAM Act by putting inaccurate header information in the commercial emails. The court noted that the CAN-SPAM Act provided at 15 U.S.C. § 7704(a)(1) that "[i]t is unlawful for any person to initial the transmission, to a computer of a commercial electronic message . . . that contains, or is accompanied by, header information that is materially misleading." The Act further explains that "materially" when used in connection with false or misleading header information, includes "alteration or concealment of header information in a manner that would impair the ability . . . to identify, locate, or respond to a person who initiated the electronic mail message or to investigate the alleged violation, or the ability of a recipient of the message to respond to a person who initiated the electronic message."15 U.S.C. § 7704(a)(6) Mummagraphics alleged that the Cruise.com emails violated this provision of the CAN-SPAM Act because their emails' header incorrectly indicated that the emails were sent from "FL-Broadcast.net" and also because the emails' "from" address indicated an email address that was non-functional.

The court rejected these claims, finding that the alleged misrepresentations were not "materially false or misleading" in view of the CAN-SPAM Act. The court noticed that the very purpose of the Cruise.com emails was to encourage the recipients to contact Cruise.com to book the cruises that the emails advertised. For this purpose, the Cruise.com emails, even though contained incorrect information in their headers, were otherwise full of ways to "identify, locate or respond to the sender" or to "investigate [an] alleges violation" of the CAN-SPAM Act. 15 U.S.C. § 7704(a)(1). For example, each email had a link to the Cruise.com website and a toll free contact number to call. Because the emails contained accurate identifiers about the sender, any inaccuracies in the header could not have impaired the efforts of any recipient, law enforcement organization, or other party raising a CAN-SPAM claim to find the company.

The court also rejected Mummagraphics' claim for alleged violation of the CAN-SPAM Act's e-mail removal provisions. At 15 U.S.C. § 7704(a)(3), the Act requires that commercial emails include "a functioning return electronic mail address or other form of Internet-based mechanism . . . that a recipient may use to submit . . . internet based communication requesting not to receive future commercial electronic mail messages." The Act also requires at 15 U.S.C. § 7704(a)(4)(A) that the senders of the commercial emails honor requests for removal made via these mechanisms within 10 business days. In addition, at 15 U.S.C. § 7706(g)(1) the Act also permits internet access service providers to bring suit under these provisions for "a pattern or practice" that violates the requirements. The court held that Mummagraphics' sole allegation that the appellees failed to remove inbox@webguy.net from the ′′E-deals′′ mailing list within 10 days of Mark Mumma's call to Omega's general counsel did not satisfy the standard of "a pattern or practice."

Thus, Mummagraphics' claims under the CAN-SPAM Act failed too.

=== Mummagraphics' tort claims under the Oklahoma state law ===
With regards to the Mummagraphics' tort claim asserting that Cruise.com's emails amounted to trespass to chattels under the Oklahoma state law, the court held that the district court correctly granted summary judgment on this claim because Mummagraphics' had not offered evidence that the Cruise.com emails caused Mummagraphics more than nominal damages.

The Court explained that trespass to chattel is a common tort that may be committed by intentionally (a) dispossessing another of the chattel, or (b) using or intermeddling with a chattel in possession of another. Such claims may be brought only when the trespasser (a) disposes the other of the chattel, (b) the chattel is impaired as to its condition, quality or value, (c) the processor is deprived of the use of the chattel for a substantial time, or (d) body harm is caused to the possessor, or harm is caused to some person or thing in which the possessor has a legally protected interest.

The court noted that no Oklahoma court had earlier recognized trespass to chattels based upon intangible invasions of commuter resources. And the courts that have recognized such causes of action have not allowed "an action for nominal damages for harmless intermeddling with the chattel." Here, Mummagraphics had failed to submit any evidence the receiving the 11 commercial emails from Cruise.com placed a meaningful burden on its computer system. Thus summary judgment was appropriate on this claim.

=== Policy considerations ===
Finally, commenting on the frustration and consternation that unsolicited commercial e-mails have created among the large number of internet users, the court stated that its role was not to determine the best way of regulating unsolicited commercial e-mails. Instead, its purpose was merely to implement the balance that the Congress sought to struck with the CAN-SPAM Act.

== Reactions ==
After Omega World Travel, some commentators were concerned that the Fourth Circuit's interpretation of CAN-SPAM may frustrate consumers' self-help measures and further insulate spammers from prosecution. Some commented that the decision made "the very narrow and ineffective CAN SPAM law even more narrow and ineffective."

== See also ==
=== General information ===
- CAN-SPAM Act of 2003
- Federal preemption
- Cyber law

=== Law journal articles ===
- Spam-a-lot: The states' crusade against unsolicited e-mail in light of the CAN-SPAM Act and the overbreadth doctrine
- The CAN-SPAM Act of 2003: A False Hope
- The Effectiveness of Litigation Under the CAN-SPAM Act.
