= Trespass to chattels =

Legal term for interference to another's possessions

Trespass to chattels, also called trespass to personalty or trespass to personal property, is a tort whereby the infringing party has intentionally (or, in Australia, negligently) interfered with another person's lawful possession of a chattel (movable personal property). The interference can be any physical contact with the chattel in a quantifiable way, or any dispossession of the chattel (whether by taking it, destroying it, or barring the owner's access to it). As opposed to the greater wrong of conversion, trespass to chattels is argued to be actionable per se.

The origin of the concept comes from the original writ of trespass de bonis asportatis. As in most other forms of trespass, remedy can only be obtained once it is proven that there was direct interference regardless of damage being done, and the infringing party has failed to disprove either negligence or intent.

In some common-law countries, such as the United States and Canada, a remedy for trespass to chattels can only be obtained if the direct interference was sufficiently substantial to amount to dispossession, or alternatively where there had been an injury proximately related to the chattel. (See Restatement (Second) of Torts, 1965.)

== United States law ==
The Restatement of Torts, Second § 217 defines trespass to chattels as "intentionally… dispossessing another of the chattel, or using or intermeddling with a chattel in the possession of another." Harm to personal property or diminution of its quality, condition or value as a result of a defendant's use can also result in liability under § 218(b) of the Restatement.

Certain specific circumstances may lend themselves to liability for the action. The Restatement (Second) of Torts § 218 states further that:

One who commits a trespass to a chattel is subject to liability to the possessor of the chattel if, but only if,

1. he dispossesses the other of the chattel, or
2. the chattel is impaired as to its condition, quality, or value, or
3. the possessor is deprived of the use of the chattel for a substantial time, or
4. bodily harm is caused to the possessor, or harm is caused to some person or thing in which the possessor has a legally protected interest.

The trespass to chattels cause of action, frequently asserted in recent years against Internet advertisers and email spammers, is often included in complaints against spyware companies. These electronic messaging cases, and their progeny, which have cropped up over the last decade, will typically turn on the situations described in (b) or (d), and, as detailed below, the question of harm caused is a big issue.

In sum, the basic elements of a claim of trespass to chattels are: 1) the lack of the plaintiff's consent to the trespass, 2) interference or intermeddling with possessory interest, and 3) the intentionality of the defendant's actions. Actual damage is not necessarily a required element of a trespass to chattels claim.

== Features of the claim ==
Lack of consent
A vendor can attempt to dispute a trespass claim on the grounds that the user consented to the terms of the contract. Even if consent was given for certain access, a user may still have a valid trespass to chattels complaint if the vendor has exceeded the contractual terms, if the contract is found to misrepresent the actual functioning of the product, or if the consent has been withdrawn. A vendor can be held liable for "any use exceeding the consent" given.

Actual harm
The precise criteria for ascertaining actual harm varies among states. In California, for instance, an electronic message can be deemed a trespass where the message interferes with the target computer's operation, as long as a plaintiff can demonstrate either actual hardware damage or actual impaired functioning. But the general concept of requiring impaired computer functioning has been adopted consistently and in showing impaired computer functioning, courts have usually emphasized system unavailability.

Intent
In clarifying the meaning of intent in the context of a trespass to chattels claim, The Second Restatement of Torts states that "intention is present when an act is done for the purpose of using or otherwise intermeddling with a chattel or with knowledge that such an intermeddling will, to a substantial certainty, result from the act," and that, furthermore, "[i]t is not necessary that the actor should know or have reason to know that such intermeddling is a violation of the possessory rights of another."

Damages from a trespass claim are limited to the actual harm sustained by the plaintiff (which can include economic loss consequent on the trespass – e.g. loss of profit on a damaged chattel). In cases of dispossession, the plaintiff is always entitled to damages if they can prove the dispossession occurred, even if no quantifiable harm can be proven.

A related tort is conversion, which involves an exercise of control over another's chattel justifying restitution of the chattel's full value. Some actions constitute trespass and conversion; in these cases, a plaintiff must choose which claim to make based on what amount of damages they seek to recover.

== In the electronic age ==
The common law tort of trespass to chattels has been invoked in the modern context of electronic communications to combat the proliferation of unsolicited bulk email, commonly known as spam. In addition, several companies have successfully used the tort to block certain people, usually competitors, from accessing their servers. Though courts initially endorsed a broad application of this legal theory in the electronic context, more recently other jurists have narrowed its scope. As trespass to chattels is extended further to computer networks, some fear that plaintiffs are using this cause of action to quash fair competition and to deter the exercise of free speech; consequently, critics call for the limitation of the tort to instances where the plaintiff can demonstrate actual damages.

=== Rules ===
The trespass to chattels tort punishes anyone who substantially interferes with the use of another's personal property, or chattels. Plaintiffs must show that the offender had intentional physical contact with the chattel and that the contact caused some substantial interference or damage. The courts that imported this common law doctrine into the digital world reasoned that electrical signals traveling across networks and through proprietary servers may constitute the contact necessary to support a trespass claim. Applying this common law action to computer networks, plaintiffs must first prove that they received some type of electronic communication (typically bulk e-mail or spam) that the defendant intentionally sent to interfere with the plaintiff's interest in his or her property and second that this communication caused a quantifiable harm to their tangible property, such as impaired functioning of the computer, network or server.

=== Early applications of trespass to chattels to computer networks ===
In the late 1990s, when the World Wide Web was in its infancy, courts were more receptive to extending the trespass to chattels tort to the electronic context. In CompuServe Inc. v. Cyber Promotions, Inc., a 1997 case that was the first to extend the trespass theory to computer networks, a federal district court held that a marketing company's mass mailing of a high volume of unsolicited advertisement emails to CompuServe subscribers constituted an actionable trespass to chattels. CompuServe customers repeatedly received unwanted advertisements from Cyber Promotions, a company that specialized in sending marketing email in bulk. Cyber Promotions also modified its equipment and falsified other information to circumvent CompuServe's anti-spam measures. Due to the high volume of email, CompuServe claimed damage to its servers as well as money lost dealing with customer complaints and dissatisfaction. CompuServe also extended its damages claim to its subscribers who spent time deleting unwanted email. The court held that Cyber Promotions's intentional use of CompuServe's proprietary server was an actionable trespass to chattels and granted a preliminary injunction enjoining the spammer from sending unsolicited advertisements to any email address maintained by CompuServe. Cyber Promotions' persistence in sending email to CompuServe's servers after receiving notification that CompuServe no longer consented to the use weighed heavily in favor of a finding of trespass.

A trio of 1998 cases in the Eastern District of Virginia involving America Online more firmly established the use of the trespass to chattels tort as a spam-fighting tool. In America Online, Inc. v. IMS, the court held that the owner of a marketing company committed trespass to chattels against an Internet service provider's (ISP) computer network by sending 60 million unauthorized email advertisements to the ISP's subscribers after being notified that the spam was unauthorized. The court found that the defendant, intentionally and without authorization, caused contact with the plaintiff's computer network by sending the bulk email messages. Such contact injured the plaintiff's business goodwill and diminished the functioning of its computer network.

Similarly, in America Online, Inc. v. LCGM, Inc., a company engaging in pornographic website advertising sent a deluge of spam to AOL's customers, and, in so doing, also forged the AOL domain name in an effort to trick customers into opening the emails. The court once again held that a website operators' transmission of unsolicited bulk emails to customers of an ISP, using the provider's computers and computer network, constituted trespass to chattels.

In America Online, Inc. v. Prime Data Systems, Inc., the defendants sent millions of spam emails to AOL subscribers advertising computer software programs designed to facilitate bulk emailing by allowing users to harvest email addresses from the plaintiff's member directories, chat rooms, and electronic bulletin boards. The defendants also used technology designed to avoid AOL's spam filtering mechanisms. The defendants frequently used false and deceptive "headers" in email messages to make it appear as if AOL had sent the messages. The increased demand on AOL's servers resulting from the spam caused substantial delays of up to 24 hours in the delivery of all email to AOL members, forcing AOL to temporarily stop accepting any new messages. As the spam problem grew worse, AOL had to purchase millions of dollars' worth of additional equipment to increase the capacity of its servers to handle the volume of email. The court held that this activity constituted a trespass to chattels and awarded injunctive relief, reasonable attorneys' fees and costs, as well as damages.

=== Beyond spam: screen scraping and data harvesting ===
Since the early spam cases, courts have extended the electronic trespass to chattels theory even further to encompass screen-scraping and other data "harvesting." Screen-scraping is the practice of taking information from another website, generally through the use of search agent software, and "harvesting" the data for one's own commercial use. For example, travel websites frequently use this tactic to offer a host of options and prices gleaned from various airlines' sites. Because the courts have entertained such litigation, some companies have specifically banned the conduct in their terms and conditions statements.

In eBay v. Bidder's Edge (2000), eBay successfully used the trespass to chattels tort to prevent Bidder's Edge from employing spiders to cull information about its auctions to display on its own website. Although Bidder's Edge's robots only consumed a small percentage of eBay's computer resources, the court noted that the plaintiff need not demonstrate current substantial interference as conduct which constituted a use of another's property is enough to sustain a trespass to chattels claim. In light of this, the court found that eBay had demonstrated a sufficient likelihood of future injury to warrant granting a permanent injunction: "If the court were to hold otherwise, it would likely encourage other auction aggregators to crawl the eBay site, potentially to the point of denying effective access to eBay's customers."

Register.com, Inc. v. Verio, Inc. (2000) is a further example of this temporary trend in which plaintiffs did not have to demonstrate any real interference. Register.com, a domain name registry service, sued competitor Verio for using Register.com's proprietary WHOIS look-up service to find potential leads among its customer base. The court found that, by continuing to access Register.com's online customer database after being told to stop, Verio was trespassing on Register.com's WHOIS server. Register.com had specifically withdrawn its consent to Verio's use of search robots to review Register.com's customer list. The court held that Verio caused harm to Register.com's files through the use of these search robots and that the searches improperly taxed Register.com's server capacity.

These holdings gave the court license to expand the applicability of trespass to chattels to computer networks even further. In Oyster Software v. Forms Processing (2001), the Northern District of California determined that a plaintiff need not demonstrate any physical interference with a server at all to sustain a trespass to chattels claim and consequently denied the defendant's motion for summary judgment, even though there was no evidence of damage to the plaintiff's computer system. Although Oyster conceded that there was no evidence that the defendant's activities had interfered in any way with the functioning of Oyster's computer system, the court nonetheless denied FPI's motion for summary judgment. According to the court, following the decision in eBay, plaintiffs only need to demonstrate that the defendant's actions "amounted to a 'use' of Plaintiff's computer," and the court determined that copying the metatags amounted to a use.

These cases indicate that, at least in California, a plaintiff did not have to demonstrate any kind of actual interference with the computer system to successfully claim trespass to chattels.

=== The backlash against the tort's expansion ===
However, some courts subsequently limited tort claims for electronic trespasses, in that a complaining party may be unable to recover for lack of real harm if the party did not suffer any tangible damage to their property.

The Supreme Court of California reversed the trend exemplified by Oyster in the seminal case Intel Corp. v. Hamidi (2003), reaffirming the need for a demonstration either of actual interference with the physical functionality of the computer system or of the likelihood that this would happen in the future. Although Intel conceded that Hamidi's emails caused neither physical damage nor any disruption to their computer system, they alleged that the economic productivity lost due to the disruption caused by the emails could sustain a trespass claim. The Supreme Court of California disagreed, holding that the tort does not extend to claims in which the electronic communication involved "neither damages the recipient computer system nor impairs its function." In reaching this conclusion, the court criticized the understanding of eBay advanced in Oyster, explaining that previous cases in which courts have found trespass to chattels in the electronic setting have involved either "actual or threatened interference with the computers' function." To that effect, the court in Oyster misconstrued the holding in eBay; trespass requires more than use a use—it requires an actual or threatened interference with the physical functionality of the system.

Although the vast majority of states have yet to determine the applicability of the trespass to chattels theory, the courts that have addressed the issue have applied Intel and required that the plaintiff demonstrate damage to the computer system. A supreme court in New York in School of Visual Arts v. Kuprewicz denied the defendant's motion to dismiss for failure to state a claim on the trespass to chattels claim because the plaintiff had alleged actual damage to the functionality of the computer system, which Intel requires; the defendant had sent enough e-mails that it reduced the computer system's functionality and drained the hard drive's memory. The Fourth Circuit in Omega World Travel, Inc. v. Mummagraphics, Inc. also followed Intel, although this resulted in granting a motion for summary judgment for the defendant because the plaintiff did not allege any actual damage on its computer system. The court clarified that Oklahoma courts have yet to recognize the validity of a trespass to chattels claim based on an electronic intrusion to a computer system, but if it were to recognize it, the plaintiff would need to allege more than nominal damages, which in this case it had not.

=== Cautions on expanding the tort in the electronic context ===
Although a number of commentators have expressed enthusiasm over the increasing "propertization" of intellectual property (that is to say, the increased application of real property doctrines to intangible property) and the extension of the trespass to chattels doctrine to computer networks, a number of detractors have expressed concern over the ramifications of extending the theory to protect electronic communications that do not actually damage the computer systems in question but only cause nominal damage due to their content. Primarily, these critics worry that extending trespass to chattels in this fashion would stifle free speech on the internet because any unwelcome email might constitute a trespass and may subject the sender not only to civil liability under the trespass theory but to criminal liability as well. This would presumably reduce people's willingness to communicate freely on the Internet and curtail the Internet's ability to function as an open, democratic forum. Particularly in situations where the electronic communication is an email that contains speech that is of importance to the public and the communications do not hamper the functionality of the recipient's computer system, First Amendment free speech protections ought to outweigh the property right in the unharmed computer system. Similarly, critics have also expressed concerns that plaintiffs have employed the doctrine to stifle legitimate competition. For example, the screen-scraping cases indicate that courts might interpret trespass to chattels in such a way that allows major corporations to prevent price comparison sites from employing harmless bots to aggregate information that users want in a readily accessible format since it might encourage consumers to look elsewhere.

Critics of the theory's extension to computer networks also note greater theoretical problems with the applicability of a real property theory to intellectual property. In order to explain why real property theories might extend to the Internet, proponents equate "cyberspace" with real land, arguing that owners of computer servers should have the same right of inviolability as owners of land receive to promote greater efficiency in transactions. However, even if some aspects of cyberspace resemble real space, detractors contend that cyberspace is not like real land at all because "the 'placeness' of cyberspace is a matter of ongoing social construction." Furthermore, even if granting property rights might help to avoid problems of inefficiency and under-cultivation in the context of real property, critics note that nothing suggests that the same principles would also be effective in the context of computer networks—especially because the problem of under-cultivation does not tend to occur online.

== See also ==
- Conversion (law)
- Detinue
- Trover
- Constructive possession
- Screen scraping
- CAN-SPAM Act of 2003
