= Intentional tort =

Civil wrong due to a deliberate act

An intentional tort is a category of torts that describes a civil wrong resulting from an intentional act on the part of the tortfeasor (alleged wrongdoer). The term negligence, on the other hand, pertains to a tort that simply results from the failure of the tortfeasor to take sufficient care in fulfilling a duty owed, while strict liability torts refers to situations where a party is liable for injuries no matter what precautions were taken.

== Background ==
As a matter of public policy, damages available for intentional torts tend to be broader and more generous than for negligent torts. To preserve individual well-being and overall social welfare, society generally wishes to deter its members from intentionally attacking each other. For example, in the United States, it is easier to get punitive damages (damages above and beyond compensatory damages) if one can prove that the tort was intentional. Similarly, in most Australian jurisdictions, intentional torts are not included in civil liability legislation, thus excluding the threshold of injury and damages payouts from various legislated limitations and caps. But it is harder to prove intentional torts because as with many felony crimes, one must prove subjective elements involving the content of the defendant's mind, and defendants do not always express their harmful intent out loud or in writing.

Intentional torts are most directly contrasted with negligent torts. The key difference between the two categories of tort is that the plaintiff must prove the additional element that the defendant acted with the specific intent to perform (i.e., acted with a mental state of intentionally performing) the act that was the proximate cause of the plaintiff's injuries (so-called malice), as opposed to simply violating a general duty of care as plaintiffs must prove in suits for negligence. "The concept of 'intention' in the intentional torts does not require that defendants know that their acts will result in harm to the plaintiffs. Defendants must know only that their acts will result in certain consequences." Under the doctrine of the transferred intent, the plaintiff may instead prove that the defendant intended to commit any intentional tort against any person rather than the specific injury that actually occurred.

Not every intentional action qualifies as an intentional tort. Suppose an investor holding more than half of a corporation's stock votes on changes the other stockholders find detrimental. If the other stockholders suffer damages as a result, this is not a tort (in the majority of jurisdictions), as the powerful investor had a right to vote whichever way he liked. Thus, the other stockholders cannot sue the aforementioned investor for damages. (California is the notable exception to this rule, at least as to closely held corporations.) If, however, John Doe physically attacks a passerby in the street, John is liable for these costs, as he is guilty of the tort of battery. Actual damages are not required for a prima facie case of battery.

To successfully sue a defendant liable for an intentional tort, the plaintiff must prove that the defendant performed the action leading to the damages the plaintiff alleges, and that the defendant acted with purpose, or that he had knowledge with substantial certainty that an act would result in a tortious result. A famous case in the 1800s involved a hemophiliac child (Vosburg) who was kicked by another child (Putney) at school, resulting in severe disability of the leg. Although the kicker could not have reasonably foreseen that the kick would cause severe disability, he certainly could have foreseen that it would cause discomfort, and was found liable.

For example, a plaintiff attempting to prove that a defendant committed the intentional tort of battery must fulfill several elements: intent, an act, cause, and harmful or offensive contact.

Here, "intent" means either purpose or "knowledge with substantial certainty," as elucidated in Garratt v. Dailey. "Cause" in an intentional tort need only be "actual cause;" that is, but for the defendant's action the tortious result would not have occurred. The plaintiff need not allege or prove proximate cause, which would indicate that the result of the defendant's actions was reasonably foreseeable.

== Categories ==
Within the broader category of intentional torts, there are two subcategories that are typically treated as distinct types of tort in their own right and are categorised according to the type of right they infringe upon:

- Property torts are a specific class of intentional torts that arise when the right invaded is a property right rather than a personal right. These include trespass to land (entering someone's land without permission), trespass to chattels (handling items owned by another without permission), and conversion (taking possession of someone else's property with the intent not to return it). Some older, and largely obsolete, property law concepts include detinue, replevin, and trover.
- Dignitary torts are categorised as such because they violate an individual's dignity, reputation, or privacy. This category of tort includes defamation (i.e. libel, slander, and false light), intrusion on seclusion, breach of confidence, and abuse of process as well as other similar causes of action. Additionally, this category of tort traditionally included actions such as criminal conversation, alienation of affections, breach of promise, and seduction among other actionable wrongs related to sex, marriage, and adultery that are obsolete or moribund in the majority of common law jurisdictions.

Intentional torts that do not fall into one of these two subcategories are typically related to physical or emotional injuries and stress and include the following:

- Assault (the immediate intentional creation of apprehension of another without consent or privilege)
- Battery (A battery is the intentional harmful or offensive touching of another without consent or privilege)
- Conversion (A conversion is the intentional exercise of dominion and control of another's property without their consent or privilege)
- False imprisonment (False imprisonment is the intent to confine or bound someone without a means of egress)
- Intentional infliction of emotional distress

== Insurability ==
Generally, intentional torts are uninsurable as a matter of public policy, meaning that tortfeasors guilty of such torts must pay damages out of their own pocket (if they have any money worth going after). Otherwise, professional criminals could obtain liability insurance to insure against the risk of being caught and prosecuted by the state, or sued in civil actions by their victims.

This rule has not precluded defendants from litigating the intentionality of particular torts and thus argue that their liability insurers would have a duty to defend and indemnify them. The Supreme Court of California forcefully shot down one such attempt: "[California Insurance Code] Section 533 precludes coverage in this case because child molestation is always intentional, it is always wrongful, and it is always harmful."
