= UBot Studio =

- Original authors: Seth Turin Media, Inc.
- Stable release: 5.9.33 / August 10, 2016; 9 years ago
- Operating system: Windows XP or later
- Platform: IA-32 and x86-64
- Available in: English
- Type: Form filler Scripting; Software testing Web scraping
- License: Proprietary commercial software
- Website: www.ubotstudio.com/

UBot Studio is a web browser automation tool, which allows users to build scripts that complete web-based actions such as data mining, web testing, and social media marketing. The scripts are created via a command window inside the UBot Studio browser, and can be compiled into separate executable files (“internet bots”) which can be run on any computer. It has been called “an infrastructural piece of the botting world”.

UBot Studio was developed by Seth Turin Media, Inc. First released in 2009, UBot Studio is the only web automation product designed for internet marketing automation. Advanced versions of UBot Studio contain a drag-and-drop user interface designer for bots, image recognition, task scheduler, and the ability to automate non web-based applications.

In 2013, the company introduced an API for the creation of plugins, to allow the addition of non-standard functionality to the software. In 2015, the company released UBot Studio Stealth, with a new browser using the CEF framework and additional features.
