= Garratt v. Dailey =

American tort law case

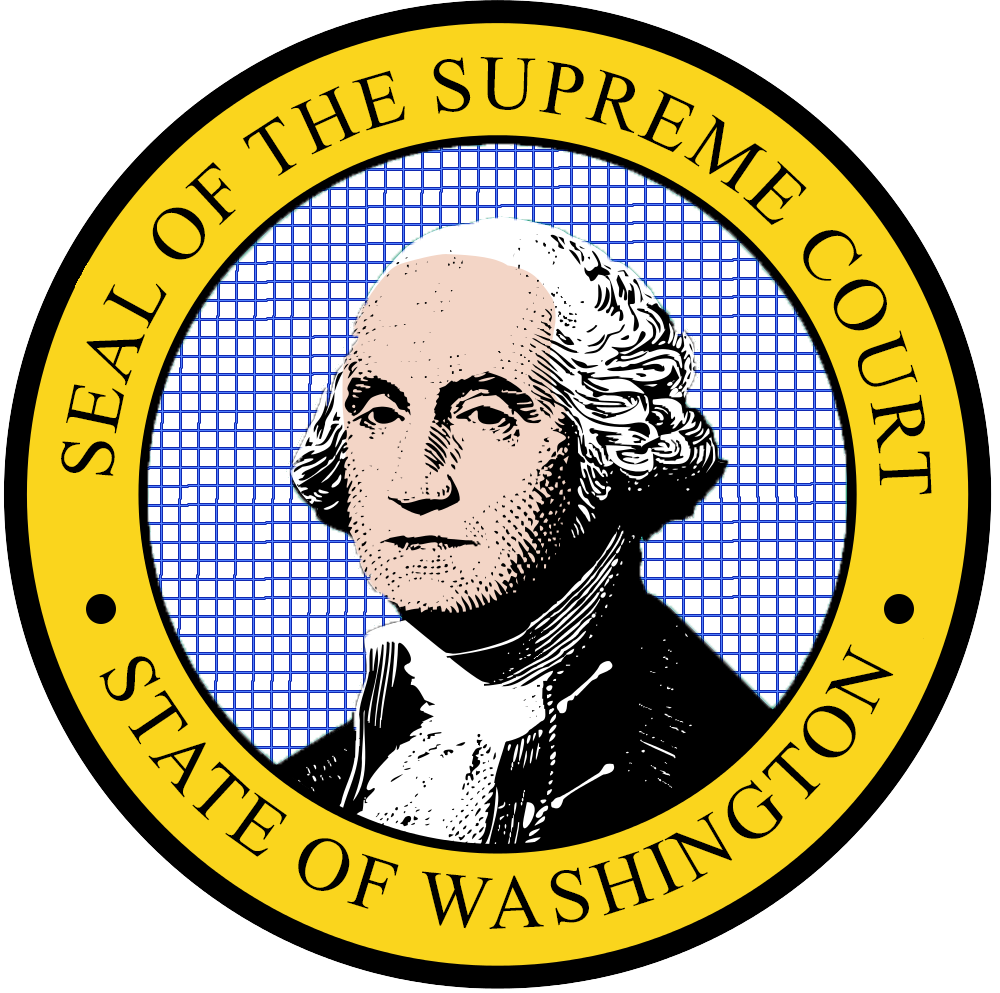
- Court: Supreme Court of Washington, Department Two
- Full case name: Ruth Garratt, Appellant, v. Brian Dailey, a Minor, by George S. Dailey, his Guardian ad Litem, Respondent
- Decided: February 14, 1955
- Citation: 46 Wn.2d 197, 279 P.2d 1091

Court membership
- Judges sitting: Matthew W. Hill, Edgar Ward Schwellenbach, Charles T. Donworth, Frank P. Weaver

Case opinions
- Decision by: Matthew W. Hill

Keywords
- Torts, Intent

Garratt v. Dailey, 46 Wash. 2d 197, 279 P.2d 1091 (Wash. 1955) is an American tort law case that illustrates the principle of "intent" for intentional torts.

== Background ==
Brian Dailey, boy aged 5 years, 9 months, moved a lawn chair on which Ruth Garratt was going to sit down. When she did, she fell, sustaining injuries. Garratt brought an action against the child for battery.

The trial judge found in favor of Dailey, stating that there was no intent to harm Garratt. Garratt appealed to the Washington Supreme Court. The issue before the Court was whether a lack of intent to cause harm precludes a battery charge.

== Ruling ==
Relying on the definition of battery from the Restatement of Torts, the Court held that battery could only be found if it is shown that the boy knew with "substantial certainty" that after the chair was moved Garratt would attempt to sit in the chair's original position. That is, the accused must be substantially certain that his action would result in the contact. The absence of an intent to injure or to play a joke is not sufficient to absolve the accused of liability. It is sufficient for the plaintiff to prove only that the accused had sufficient knowledge to foresee the contact with "substantial certainty."

The Court, noting that a new trial was unnecessary, remanded the case back to the trial court for clarification of the boy's knowledge at the time. Subsequently, the trial court found in favor of Garratt and was affirmed by the state Supreme Court.
