= Restatement of Torts, Second =

American legal treatise

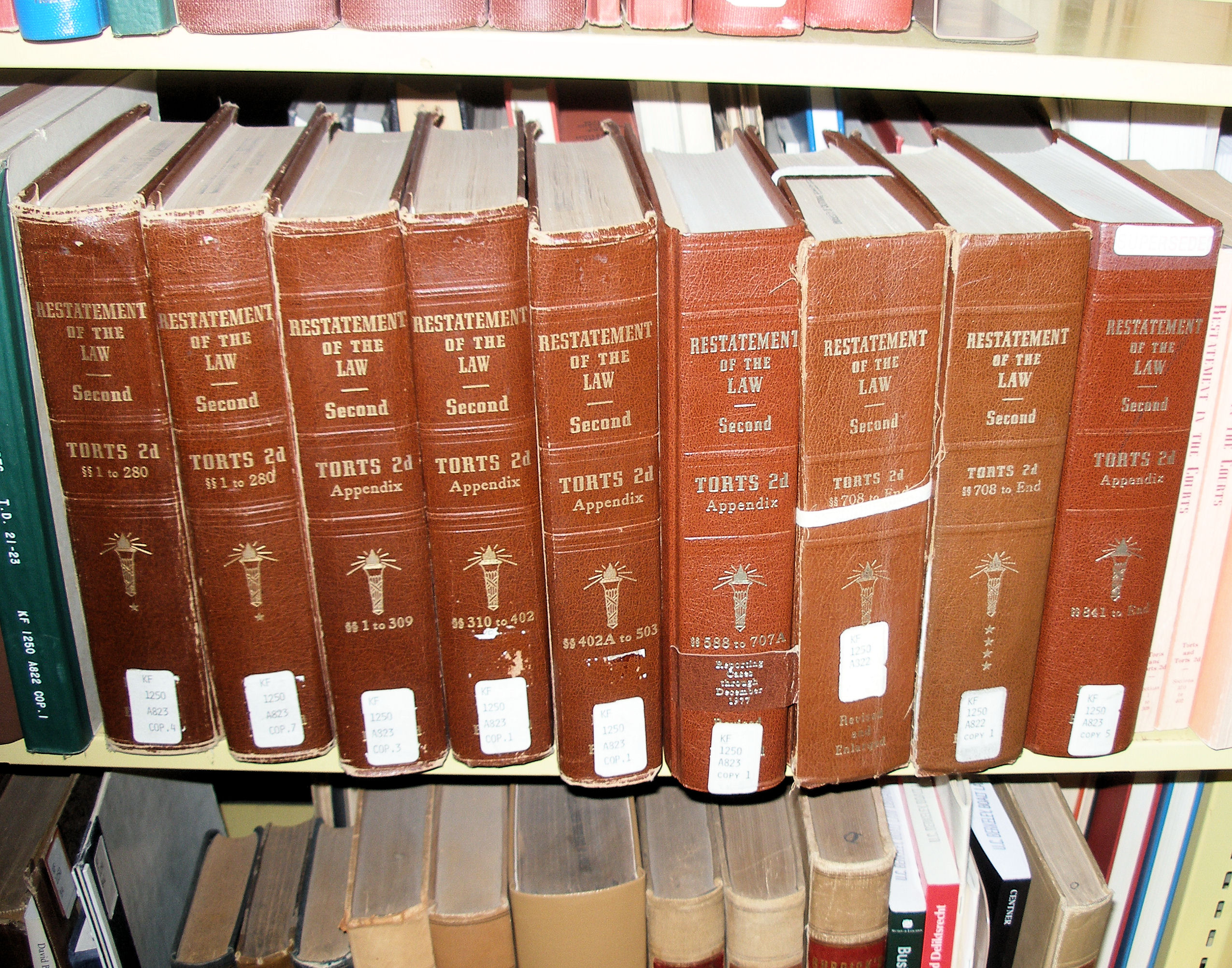
The Restatement (Second) of Torts

The Restatement of Torts, Second, is a treatise issued by the American Law Institute. It summarizes the general principles of United States tort law. The volumes covering torts are part of the second Restatements of the Law series.

It includes four volumes, with the first two published in 1965, the third in 1977 and the last in 1979.

Section 402A of this Restatement, discussing strict liability for defective products, is by far the most widely cited section of any Restatement.

== See also ==
- Restatements of the Law
