= Substantial certainty doctrine =

In law, the substantial certainty doctrine is the assumption of intent even if the actor did not intend the result, but knew with substantial certainty the effect would occur as a result of his action. The doctrine can be used by courts as a test to determine whether or not a defendant committed a tort. For example, in Garratt v. Dailey (1955), the Washington Supreme Court remanded a case back to the lower courts to determine whether or not the five year-old defendant "knew with substantial certainty that the plaintiff would attempt to sit down where the chair which he moved had been."
