= False designation of origin =

In consumer law, false designation of origin occurs when the manufacturer or seller lies about the country of origin or maker of its products. For example, if a manufacturer makes a product and then claims that it is a high end name brand product.

In U.S. law, false designation of origin is defined by 15 U.S.C. § 1125.
