= Intel Corp. v. Hamidi =

Legal issue

Intel v. Hamidi
- Supreme Court of California
- Full case name: Intel Corporation V. Kourosh Kenneth Hamidi
- Citation(s): 30 Cal. 4th 1342; 71 P.3d 296

Case history
- Prior history: Superior Court of the Sacramento County, Intel Corp. v. Hamidi, 94 Cal. App. 4th 325

Holding
- There can be no tort of trespass to chattels for electronic communications that neither damages the recipient computer system nor impairs its functioning.

Case opinions
- Majority: Kathryn Werdegar, joined by Joyce L. Kennard, Carlos R. Moreno, Steven Z. Perren
- Concurrence: Joyce L. Kennard
- Dissent: Stanley Mosk, joined by Ronald M. George
- Dissent: Janice Rogers Brown

Intel Corp. v. Hamidi, 30 Cal. 4th 1342 (2003), is a decision of the California Supreme Court, authored by Associate Justice Kathryn Werdegar. In Hamidi the California Supreme Court held that a former Intel Corporation employee's e-mails to current Intel employees, despite requests by Intel to stop sending messages, did not constitute trespass of Intel's e-mail system.

Kourosh Kenneth Hamidi was a former Intel employee who sent e-mails criticizing Intel to current Intel employees. Because the messages caused discussion among employees, Intel asserted that these communications constitute trespass to chattels under California law. The trial court agreed and enjoined Hamidi from sending additional e-mails. Hamidi appealed his decision to the Court of Appeal, which affirmed the trial court's decision. The California Supreme Court, by a vote of 4-3, reversed.

The decision was notable because the court declined to extend common law trespass claims to the computer context, absent actual damage.

== Background ==
Hamidi was a former engineer at Intel's Automotive Group when in September 1990, he was injured in a car accident while returning from a business trip on behalf of Intel. He returned to work for 18 months until his worsening physical condition caused him to take a medical leave on January 27, 1992 at the advice of Intel's doctors. He remained on medical leave until he was fired on April 17, 1995 for failing to return to work after the medical leave.

After termination, Hamidi formed a support group for former and current employees of Intel: Associated X-Employees of Intel (AXE-Intel), later renamed Former And Current Employees of Intel (FACE-Intel). Over a 21-Month period, Hamidi sent six waves of e-mails to Intel employees on behalf of the organization. The e-mails were critical of Intel's employment practices and encouraged employees to become involved in FACE-Intel. Each e-mail stated that the recipient could notify the sender to remove them from the mailing list, and Hamidi stopped sending e-mails to those who requested.

Although some of the e-mails were blocked by Intel's internal filters, Hamidi succeeded in evading blocking efforts by using different sending computers. In March, 1998 Intel demanded that Hamidi and FACE-Intel stop sending e-mails, but he sent another mass e-mail in September, 1998.

Intel sued Hamidi and FACE-Intel pleading cause of action for trespass to chattel and nuisance seeking damages and an injunction against further messages. Intel later dismissed its nuisance claim and waived the demand for damages. The trial court granted Intel's request for summary judgment and set a permanent injunction against Hamidi and FACE-Intel from sending unsolicited e-mails to the company.

Hamidi appealed the decision, and with one justice dissenting, the appellate court found that Intel "showed he was disrupting its business by using its property and therefore is entitled to injunctive relief based on a theory of trespass to chattels."

== The opinion ==
The Supreme Court held that Hamidi did not bypass any security barriers to communicate with Intel employees, offering to remove any recipient who did not wish to be on the mailing list. While sending the unsolicited e-mails in bulk, they did not at any point cause damage to Intel computers, nor deprive the company use of their computers. Upon reviewing unauthorized computer contact as trespasses to chattels, in California Law, the tort does not and should not apply to electronic communications that neither damage nor impair the function of the recipient computer systems. As the court stated:

Intel's claim fails not because e-mail transmitted through the Internet enjoys unique immunity, but because the trespass to chattels tort--unlike the causes of action just mentioned--may not, in California, be proved without evidence of an injury to the plaintiff's personal property or legal interest therein.

. . .

In the present case, the claimed injury is located in the disruption or distraction caused to recipients by the contents of the e-mail message an injury entirely separate from, and not directly affecting, the possession or value of personal property.

The Court compared the discussion among managers and employees, which Intel described as loss of productivity reading and responding to the messages, as well as setting up internal filters for those messages as no "more than the personal distress caused by reading an unpleasant letter would be an injury to the recipient’s mailbox, or the loss of privacy caused by an intrusive telephone call would be an injury to the recipient’s telephone equipment."

The court asserted that this did not give electronic communications any special immunity, and that like other forms of communications, e-mail can cause damage to recipients and may be actionable under various common law or statutory theories. The reason Intel's claim fails is because in California, trespass of chattels tort may not be proved without evidence of damage to the plaintiff's property or legal interest in the property. However, if the extraordinary quantity, or opportunity to escalate to an extraordinary quantity of unsolicited commercial e-mails impairs the computer's functioning, then the claimed injury is in the disruption caused by the tremendous burden of the contents of those e-mail messages.
