= Detinue =

Legal action to recover for the wrongful taking of personal property

In tort law, detinue (/ˈdɛtɪˌnjuː/) is an action to recover for the wrongful taking of personal property. It is initiated by an individual who claims to have a greater right to their immediate possession than the current possessor. For an action in detinue to succeed, a claimant must first prove that he had better right to possession of the chattel than the defendant, and second, that the defendant refused to return the chattel once demanded by the claimant.

Detinue allows for a remedy of damages for the value of the chattel, but unlike most other interference torts, detinue also allows for the recovery of the specific chattel being withheld.

== History ==
Historically, detinue came in two forms: "detinue sur bailment" and "detinue sur trover".

- In detinue sur bailment, the defendant is in a bailment relationship with the claimant and either refuses to return the chattel or else has negligently or intentionally lost or destroyed it. The onus is on the bailee to prove that the loss of the chattel was not his or her fault.
- In detinue sur trover, the defendant can be any individual in possession of the chattel who refuses to return it to the claimant. A defendant could be a finder or a thief or any innocent third party, and the claimant need only have a better right to possession.

Early writs and forms of action were exceptionally narrow in scope. This is reflective of the basic conservatism of the common law courts in the middle and late medieval period. This was in contrast with the courts of equity, which were creative in producing novel writs for many new fact situations. Compensation in those days was usually not in money, which was rare, but in land, livestock, or furnishings, as these were the typical measures of wealth. What the plaintiff wanted back was the land, cattle or even coins lent. Maitland suggests that in the earliest time the writ of debt seems almost to have been designed to recover identical coins.

The early writ of detinue was specifically designed for recovery of a chattel wrongfully detained, but not an action to recover loss due to a chattel being harmed while the defendant had it.

Two facts marked the early common law actions. They were defective because of the wide field which was excluded. They were also defective because the plaintiff might well think himself entitled to a remedy, but by reason of the procedure find that he went away empty. The defendant to a writ of debt or detinue might bring others with him who would swear that his denial of the claim was true. This was technically called his "wage of law" or "wager of law". It was enough to dispose of the plaintiff's claim. A common way to escape all writs, even the writ of right, as well as debt and detinue was to claim sickness. If the jury found him in bed with his boots off, the custom was to delay the writ for a year and a day.

== Relation to replevin ==
One of the oldest actions in the royal courts was replevin which had its roots in the law of customary courts. Strictly speaking, replevin in its original form was a provisional remedy. Its provision was to procure for the plaintiff the return of chattels taken out of his possession until the right to their possession could be decided by a court of law. No doubt, it was designed to avoid quarrels likely to cause a breach of the peace pending a settlement of the dispute about the right to possession. In other words, the rule of law was beginning to replace that of local force of arms and personal conflict as the resolution of disputes over chattels. The action was in direct succession to the efforts made to regulate self-help, which were the origin of the law of tort. The form of legal recourse was in connection of distress (distractio). This was the practice of taking some chattel from the peasant or underling until some action was performed. In the medieval era the services for which distress could be levied were numerous, since the incidents of tenure were then very numerous. Distress was also leviable as damage feasant. When animals strayed and did damage to a neighbor, they could be retained until the damage was made good. Whether or not the distress was levied for rent or for livestock damage feasant, the owner of the animals could obtain their release by giving "gage and pledge" – a form of security that the damage would be made good. One peculiarity of distraint lay in the fact that the distrainor did not get any form of legal possession. The goods and chattels were considered to be in the custody of the law. As a result, there was no taking of possession by the distrainor that was unlawful, since no possession was technically inferred.

The action in replevin began to appear in the thirteenth century. It seems clear that originally the action of replevin lay simply where the question to be determined was that of wrongful distress. Excess and abuse of distress was punished.

The mere claim by the distrainor that he had a right to the chattels distrained was a technicality that ended the action in replevin. It was then necessary to re-file using a new writ invented in the early fourteenth century, called the writ de proprietate probanda – a writ "concerning the proof of ownership".

== Alternatives to replevin ==
Since the distrainor did not get possession he was not originally liable in trespass, and the spheres of the two forms of action remained distinct. During the fourteenth century, after some vacillation by judges, it was held that the plaintiff could elect which remedy he chose when the chattels had been distrained. It was also held that replevin could be used in place of the writ of trespass de bonis aspotatis (trespass by the asportation of goods). In reality, there is little evidence this substitution ever occurred with any frequency, if at all. The rule involved interference with the possession of a chattel by the rightful owner. The 1856 case of Mennie v. Blake gives what Harold Potter calls an admirable survey of the law of replevin. There it was stated:

"It seems clear that replevin is not maintainable unless in a case in which there has been first a taking out of the possession of the owner. This stands upon authority and the reason of the thing." In the Law of Torts, John Fleming wrote: "From medieval times, there has also come down to us a summary process, known as replevin, by which a man out of whose possession goods have been taken may obtain their return until the right to the goods can be determined by a court of law. Replevin arose out of the need of a turbulent society to discourage resort to self help and although for a long time primarily used in disputes about distress between landlord and tenant, it was gradually expanded to cover all cases of allegedly wrongful dispossession. If the plaintiff wanted return of his chattel in specie, replevin was a more appropriate remedy than either trespass or trover in which only damages could be recovered. Restoration of the property is, of course, only provisional, pending determination of title."

It depended upon an original unlawful taking by the way of distraint. During the seventeenth and eighteenth centuries the action of trover largely replaced trespass for wrongful distress. Replevin and trover never completely coincided, because there was a limitation on replevin.

Replevin remains the modern action, albeit defined by statute, for recovery of chattels pending a decision of the right of possession. It lies only where the possession was taken from the plaintiff, whether under colour of legal process or otherwise, by an act having the nature of a trespass.

== Canadian cases distinguishing replevin from detinue ==
Manitoba Agricultural Credit Corp. v Heaman, a 1990 Canadian case, the Manitoba Court of Appeal adopted the words of the 1875 Manitoba Administration of Justice Act as having "codified, but not changed, at least in substance the action of replevin" by saying,

Whenever any goods, chattels, bonds, debentures, promissory notes, bills of exchange, books of account, papers, writings, valuable securities or other personal property or effects have been wrongfully distrained under circumstances in which by the law of England replevin might be made, the person so complaining of such distress as unlawful, may obtain a writ of replevin in the manner prescribed by this Act

In the 1899 case McGregor v McGregor, British Columbia Supreme Court justice Irving wrote:

An action of replevin may be brought (1) where goods have been wrongfully distrained or (2) where goods have been otherwise, i.e. otherwise than by distress, wrongfully taken or detained. The word 'wrongfully' is applicable to both cases. 'Wrongfully' ... imports the infringement of some right, and any invasion of the civil rights of another is in itself a legal wrong, and the appropriate action for the violation of the legal right unconnected with contract is an action for tort. The early history of replevin action in England is traced (as) ... The nature of the complaint in the action was for a tortious taking of the goods. Our British Columbia replevin action, which is wider than the English, gives the right to replevy to the party who could maintain trespass or trover. It is given, as it were, supplementary to, or in aid of, the remedy which those actions afford; but as all three actions, trespass, trover and replevin are classed ... as actions of tort, I think the action under our British Columbia statute is for the tortious taking or tortious detention of goods.

== Medieval detinue ==
Detinue was an old form of action which slowly branched off from the action of debt. The action lay for the unlawful detention of ascertained chattels at the instance of a person who was entitled to have possession. The writ was a command to the defendant that he should deliver up to the plaintiff the chattels quae ei injuste detinet – "which he unlawfully withholds from him". The gist of the action was the unlawful detention by the defendant. An example is seen when a borrower might be sued for unlawfully refusing to return a borrowed article.

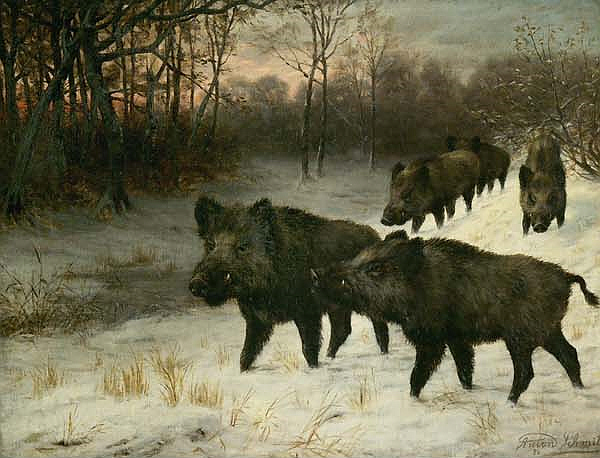
Bracton described an early case of detinue where three pigs were unlawfully detained from a woman.

Ames regarded the action of detinue as essentially an action based upon contract, having its foundation in bailment. Ames' point is that the action was a means of enforcing an agreement which was recognized by the law. This argument represents the realization of a theory of contract in detinue. Detinue also replaced the more ancient action of res adiratae. According to Bracton the plaintiff could drop the words felony and merely claim that his chattels were in the possession of the defendant. Holdsworth is of the opinion that the gist of this action was unlawful detention. Holdsworth bases this on a case from Bracton's notebook in which the plaintiff alleges that "William Nutach in the peace of God and of our Lord the King and of his bailiffs unjustly detains (injuste detinuit) from her three pigs which were lost to her." The action depended upon loss of the chattel, which had come to the hands of a defendant who had refused on demand to give it up. Holdsworth deduces this case was the forerunner of the action in detinue, which also lay to recover a lost chattel. Ames is of the opinion that this case represents not so much an action, but a formal demand made in court for the return of the chattel, which, if denied, could be followed by an appeal. It is certain that an appeal could be substituted after an allegation of res adiratae had been made. It is disputed whether proceedings in res adiratae could not be brought in royal courts. Holdsworth cites a case from 1292 which seems to fulfill all the requirements of res adiratae. "Note that where a thing belonging to a man is lost, he may count that he (the finder) tortiously detains it. Etc. and tortiously for this that whereas he lost the said thing on such a day, etc. he (the loser) on such a day etc., found it in the house of such a one and prayed him to restore the thing but he would not restore it, etc., to his damage, etc.; and if he etc. In this case the demandant must prove by his law (his own hand the twelfth; i.e. wager of law) that he lost the thing."

Ames said of detinue "In the first place, the count must allege a bailment, and a traverse of this allegation was an answer to the action." However, there are many instances where allegation of bailment was not necessary for an action in detinue. Holdsworth cites a 1313 case in which the counsel. Toudeby for the defendant pleaded no allegation of bailment, but Scrope, the counsel for the demandant (plaintiff), replied that, if the defendant carried off the chattels and a writ was brought to recover them, it was no answer to say that the chattels had not been bailed to the plaintiff. Still the case turned on the question of bailment. In 1343, the defendant was driven to a traverse in these terms: "We tell you that the horse did not come into our keeping, nor do we detain the horse, as he counts." In 1410, both counsel agreed that an action of detinue lay whether the chattel was bailed or whether the defendant found it in the road. The plea simply amounted to an assumption that the chattels had come into the hands of the defendant (devenerunt ad manus), and were wrongfully withheld from the plaintiff.

== Detinue sur trover ==
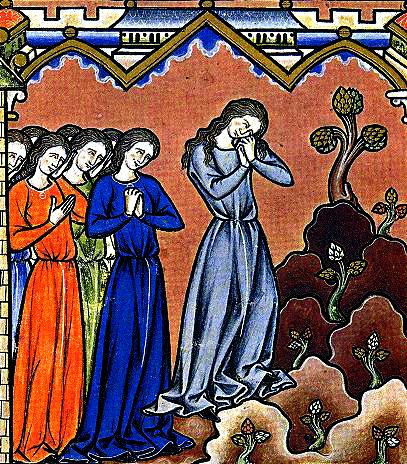
Traditionally, clothes bailed then destroyed led to an action in trespass. After Bracton an action in detinue applied, but not in every case.

During the fifteenth century, this plea gave rise to a special form of the action of detinue known as "detinue sur trover" which should be distinguished from the action of "trespass on the case sur trover". The latter would be shortened into simple trover. Littleton remarked that the count or plea of "per interventionem (sur trover) was a newfound halliday." The action probably represents the development of a simpler form of pleading in which it was unnecessary to allege by what means the chattel had come into the defendant's hands. Nevertheless, the counts sur bailment and sur trover seem to have had the effect of drawing a distinction between two forms of action, detinue sur trover and detinue sur bailment. This distinction represented the recognition of the two forms of wrongful detention: one based on a purely tortious wrong and the other connected with an agreement between the parties. Detinue sur trover is of greater interest in tort because it covers a more general field. It was distinguished from trespass since it did not involve any interference with the physical possession of the plaintiff. It did not depend on a failure to fulfill a condition to return the chattel which had been delivered to the defendant. There was no necessity for an agreement between the parties.

There were certain defects in detinue sur trover. Wager of law was a possible defense in certain kinds of cases. Wager of law involved the use by a defendant of witnesses, some of whom may have had no knowledge of the case to testify. If a large number of these "witnesses" testified, the defendant would prevail. It was a form of sanctioned perjury. The courts began to severely limit wager of law by the middle of the fourteenth century. No action lay where the chattel was returned but in a damaged or impaired condition. In 1478, Catesby said, "And in the same manner I deliver my robes to you to keep for me and you wear them so that they perish, I shall have an action of detinue for in all these cases the property is not altered, and afterwards an action on the case and recover damages for the loss sustained by your using the clothes." the same opinion was reiterated in 1510 by Serjeant Moore, although an action would lie for trespass on the case. In the cases of a chattel damaged or destroyed, the plaintiff must choose some remedy other than detinue. This was also true if the bailee dealt with the property in an improper manner as noted by Littleton in 1462: "I bail to you my cloak and you burn it, I will have a writ of trespass on the case against you (and not detinue)." It was doubtful whether detinue lay where, after bailment, a third party had destroyed the chattel bailed. The action lay against a bailee who had himself been responsible for the loss, as where a charter had been found by the jury to have been burned. It was disputed whether this remedy applied to the action of a third party. Judge Brian said, "If I bail my horse to a smith to shoe and he bails it to another smith who damages the horse an action will not lie against him." The second party was a stranger to the bailment, but the other justices were opposed to this opinion of Brian.

By the time of Bracton, the old preference for an action in trespass exclusively was seen to have softened somewhat, with certain actions allowed against a third party in detinue. This began to make wager of law ineffective as a defense. The judges of the time were growing wary of wager of law as a legitimate defense, anyway. This attitude allowing detinue was not universally held, as can be seen from the cases noted in this section.

== Bracton on third party liability ==
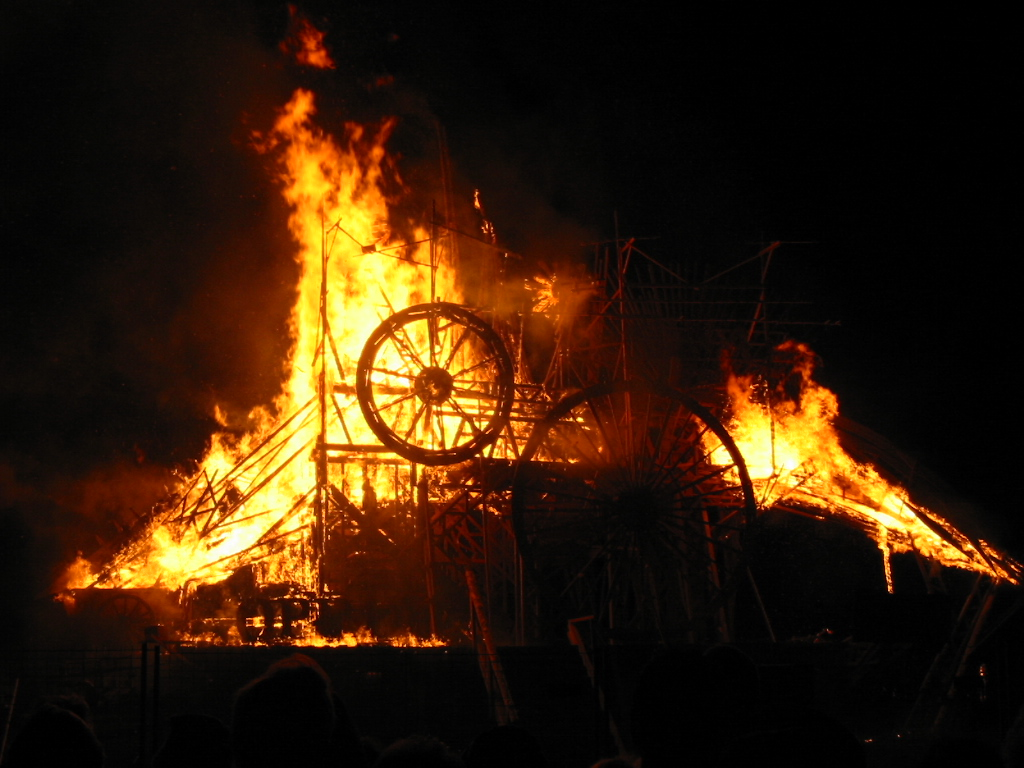
A case from 1200 directed the verdict against a bailee who claimed chattels in his keeping were stolen during a fire at his property.

In the opinion of Bracton, if goods were unlawfully taken from the possession of the bailee, it was he who had the action against the wrongdoer, not the original bailor. The action was appeal of larceny or trespass. Even in the time of Bracton, there was pressure to change this arrangement and allow the bailor to bring an action directly against the third party. Under the old rules, the bailee had an absolute responsibility to the bailor for safe keeping of the goods. A case from 1200 directed the verdict for lost goods against the bailee who claimed they had been lost and stolen during a fire at his property. Glanvill also held this opinion. Glanvill held that the bailee was absolutely bound to restore the lost chattel or its value. Bracton appeared to mitigate the old rule. If the bailee had shown due diligence, there was room for mitigation of damages. However, it was never clear how Bracton would decide to proportion damages. Bracton's description has been called Romanesque, and premature. Even by Bracton's time, lawyers were becoming accustomed to the notion that bailees did not have an absolute liability for chattels bailed to their tending, assuming they used reasonable care or diligence in handling them. In Bracton's text, there was the beginning of the notion that bailee had an action for loss, assuming he had some interest in the chattel beyond mere possession. That must be some kind of responsibility for its care and safety. It had not developed very far. Bracton more than once seems to require that the appellor shall complain of a theft of his own goods or of goods for which he has been made responsible, namely, intravit in solutionem erga dominum suum. The time between conveyance and possession was ill-defined. The time of bailee possession was called the custodia or "custody". The bailee had three courses of action: (1) the appeal of larceny; (2) the action of trespass; (3) the action of detinue. Bracton wrote of detinue:

It would seem at first sight that the action in which a movable is demanded should be as well in rem as in personam, for he whom the thing is demanded and the possessor is bound to restore that thing; but in truth it is merely in personam for he from whom the thing is demanded is not absolutely bound to restore it, but is bound alternatively to restore it or its price; and this, whether the thing be forthcoming or no. And therefore, if a man vindicates his movable chattel as having been carried off for any cause, or as having been lent (commodatum), he must in his action define its price, and propound his claim thus: – I, such a one, demand that such a one do restore to me such a thing of such a price: – or – I complain that such a one detains from me, or has robbed me of, such a thing of such a price: – otherwise, no price being named, the vindication of a movable thing will fail.

== The question of ownership and possession ==
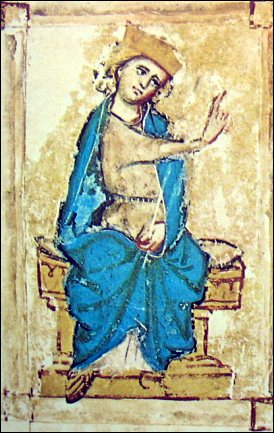
A case from 1292 debated whether an action in detinue could be brought against a widow.

From a case in 1292, the following was reported:

I bail a charter for safe custody to a married woman; her husband dies; can I bring an action of detinue against her, it being clear law that a married woman not bind herself by contract?

Huntingdon: Sir, our plaint is of a tortious detinue of a charter which this lady is now detaining from us. We crave judgment that she ought to answer for her tort.

Lowther: The cause of your action is the bailment; and at that time she could not bind herself. We crave judgment if she must now answer for a thing about which she could not bind herself.

Spigurnel: If you had bailed to the lady thirty marks for safe custody while she was coverte for return to you when you should demand them, would she be now bound to answer? I think not. And so in this case.

Howard: The cases are not similar; for in a writ of debt you shall say debet, while here you shall say iniuste detinet. And again, in this case, an action arises from a tortious detainer and not from bailment. We crave judgment.

Lowther: We repeat what we have said.

The question of what was the nature of the action of detinue remained open till the present time.

This case illustrates two points. Ownership was key to determining the kind of action to be brought for remedy. Ownership was unclear, and difficult to define at the end of the thirteenth century.

== Detinue separated from debt ==
Glanvill described one action which had features of both debt and detinue. They were the same. In his time, the form of the writ was a demand for a sum of money which could be issued for various reasons. "Debt" or detinue could be demanded for return of the loan of money, the price of sale, the loan of a chattel, letting to hire, or a deposit. The writ was available for a creditor against a surety on the default of the principal debtor. Glanvill speaks of debt and its writ as being a retrieval of "debt that is due", or detinue. Later, and by the time of Bracton, detinue had been more or less separated from primary actions in debt, Detinue had come to be restricted to actions against bailees. After Bracton, the special situation of de bonis asportatis, the taking of chattels by a bailee or theft of these from a bailee gave rise to the special situation of trover. Trover became fully formed in the reign of Elizabeth I. By the end of Bracton's life and into the reign of Edward I, debt was confined to contract law, while detinue was concerned with the developing issues of personal property.

== Breaking the bulk ==
Occasionally, the issue of a transporting agent, a bailee who was charged with moving chattels would open the wrapped packages and misappropriate the contents. This was called breaking the bulk. In 1315, an action in detinue was allowed for "breaking the bulk". Later, in 1473, breaking the bulk was determined to be a felony, and not an action in pure detinue.

== Detinue in United States law ==
In the United States, detinue is a possessory action having for its object the recovery of specific personal property and damages for its detention. At common law an action of detinue would lie for the recovery of specific personal property unlawfully detained, or its value, and for damages for its detention. Detinue differs from replevin in that possession of the chattel in controversy is not changed until after the judgment in detinue, whereas in replevin possession is changed at the beginning of the proceeding. The gist of an action in detinue is that the defendant is wrongfully in possession of personal property which belongs to the plaintiff, whereas replevin lies only where there has been a wrongful taking or seizure of the property. Detinue is distinguished from common-law trover which is for the recovery of damages for the wrongful conversion of personal property. In modern practice, detinue has been superseded almost entirely by statutory actions for the recovery of personal property.

== England and Wales ==
In England and Wales, detinue was abolished from 1 January 1978 by the Torts (Interference with Goods) Act 1977. However, the tort of conversion was extended at the same time to cover circumstances that had previously been covered only by detinue.

== See also ==
- Conversion (law)
- Replevin
- Trespass to chattels
- Trover
- Rei vindicatio

== Notes ==
a: "Halliday" is likely a figure of speech, an allusion to a 1355 case in which the defendant, Halyday, was deemed to have obtained items unimpeachably.
