= Armory v Delamirie =

Landmark English legal case about loss of personal property

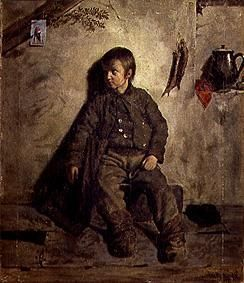
- Court: Court of King's Bench
- Decided: 31 July 1722
- Citation: (1722) 1 Strange 505, 93 ER 664
- Transcript: BAILII

Court membership
- Judge sitting: Sir John Pratt CJ

Armory v Delamirie [1722] EWHC J94, (1722) 1 Strange 505, is a famous English case on personal property law and finder's rights. It is one of the first cases that established possession as a valuable property right and as evidence of ownership. The defendant in the case was Paul de Lamerie, a great producer of silverworks in the 18th century. His name was misspelled by the court reporter.

== Facts ==
Armory was a chimney sweep's boy who found a jewel in the setting of a ring. He took the jewel to the shop of Delamirie, a goldsmith, to obtain a valuation of the item. An apprentice, the agent of Delamirie, surreptitiously removed the gems from the setting on the pretence of weighing it. The apprentice returned with the empty setting and informed Armory that it was worth three halfpence. The apprentice offered to pay him for it but Armory refused and asked the apprentice to return the stones and setting in their prior condition. The apprentice returned the socket of the jewel without the gems. Armory brought an action against Delamirie in trover (via respondeat superior for the actions of his apprentice).

The issue before the court was whether either party had any property rights to the jewel.

== Judgment ==
The Court held that both Armory and Delamirie had property rights in the jewel, even though neither was the true owner. Sir John Pratt CJ held they each have a right to possession that is enforceable against everyone except those with a greater right to the possession. The true owner of the jewel was not relevant; the Court was only concerned with who had a better right to possession. The priority of rights to possession says that a finder has better title to property that he or she finds over everyone except the true owner, and Armory thus had full title to the jewel. The Court found in favour of Armory. Since the jewel was not produced at the trial, Armory was awarded the maximum value that a jewel of that form could have (under the principle that a wrongdoer should not be able to derive gain, i.e. uncertainty of damages, from the effects of his wrongdoing).

The report shows the following text:

The plaintiff being a chimney sweeper's boy found a jewel and carried it to the defendant's shop (who was a goldsmith) to know what it was, and delivered it into the hands of the apprentice, who under pretence of weighing it, took out the stones, and calling to the master to let him know it came to three halfpence, the master offered the boy the money, who refused to take it, and insisted to have the thing again; whereupon the apprentice delivered him back the socket without the stones. And now in trover against the master these points were ruled:

1. That the finder of a jewel, though he does not by such finding acquire an absolute property or ownership, yet he has such a property as will enable him to keep it against all but the rightful owner, and subsequently may maintain trover.

2. That the action well lay against the master, who gives a credit to his apprentice, and is answerable for his neglect, Jones v Hart, Salk 441. Cor. Holt CJ Mead v Hammond, supra. Grammer v Nixon, post, 653.

3. As to the value of the jewel several of the trade were examined to prove what a jewel of the finest water that would fit the socket would be worth; and the Chief Justice directed the jury, that unless the defendant did produce the jewel, and shew it not to be of the finest water, they should presume the strongest case against him, and make the value of the best jewels the measure of their damages: which they accordingly did.

== Literature ==
Armory v Delamirie inspired A. M. Watson's literary fiction novel Infants of the Brush: A Chimney Sweep's Story, which focuses on the life of the chimney sweep's boy who found the jewel.

== See also ==
- Lost, mislaid, and abandoned property
- Trover
- Conversion (law)
