= Trover =

Type of lawsuit in common law

Trover (/ˈtroʊvər/) is a form of lawsuit in common law jurisdictions for recovery of damages for wrongful taking of personal property. Trover belongs to a series of remedies for such wrongful taking, its distinctive feature being recovery only for the value of whatever was taken, not for the recovery of the property itself (see replevin).

== Overview ==
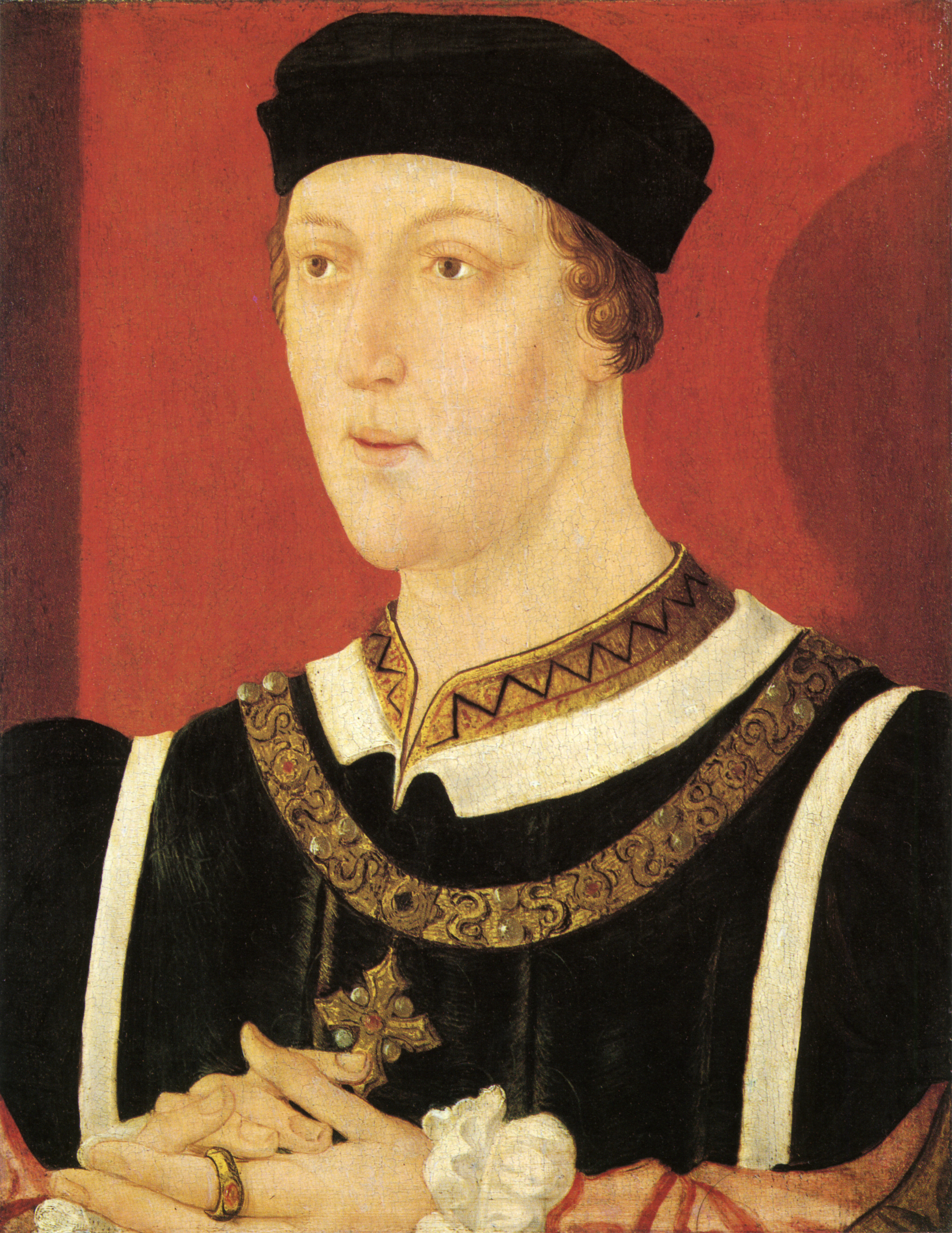
The law of trover greatly expanded during the reign of Henry VI of England, 1422–1461 and 1470–1471.

Although actions in trover can be traced to the time of Bracton, and later Edward I of England, it became more clearly defined later during the reign of Henry VI of England, 1422–1461 and 1470–1471. Action in trover became a mature legal doctrine during the reign of Elizabeth I of England, 1558–1603.

Early trover cases involved the keeping or taking of a bailment by the bailee (the person charged to hold the property with "ordinary care"). Others concerned the use of lost chattels found by another and determining who was the real owner. Early on, there was difficulty in dealing with situations where chattels held by a bailee were used by a third party. Examples could be sheep, horses, farm goods, grains or other chattels left in the care of a person who was required to exercise ordinary care. If negligence led to damages, an action could be had. A third person might use the chattel, returning it in a damaged condition. The early common law had some difficulty in dealing with this kind of situation. This led to expansions of actions in trover.

The theory of trover was that the defendant, by "converting" the chattel to his own use, had appropriated the plaintiff's property, for which he was required to make compensation. The plaintiff was not required to accept the chattel when it was tendered back to him. He could recover damages for the full value of the chattel at the time and place of conversion. The effect was that the defendant was compelled to buy the chattel at a forced sale, carried out by means of an action in trover.

Trover actions frequently concerned the finding of lost property. It could also involve cargo on ships, such as those lost at sea and later found. Trover often involved cases in which the only "most correct" owner could be determined. For instance, if an envelope of bank notes or currency were to be found, the court would attempt to identify the true owner, but this would often prove to be impossible. In that case, the finder would be the next best owner and be considered the rightful possessor. Trover cases have been described as "finders keepers, losers weepers" cases.

Trover damages came to be measured by the market value of the object, not necessarily its replacement cost if it were new. Sometimes, compensation for deprivation of use and compensation for other losses naturally and proximately caused by the wrongful taking could be added. Case law results are mixed. The plaintiff could also recover interest that would have been earned by the money value of the object and any expense (except attorney's fees) incurred in attempting to recover the object. If the taker sold the object for more than its market value, the plaintiff could receive the higher price. However, selling the chattel could change the action to that of a true conversion which was a form of theft. If the taker had made improvements on the object (e.g., repainted it), the value of such improvements are not deducted from the plaintiff's recovery unless the taking was by mistake.

== Trover as an extension of detinue and trespass ==
Trespass and trover were both actions founded upon possession. For many centuries, they were alternative remedies for the wrongful taking of, or damage to chattels. There was a distinction between the actions. In the theory of trespass, the plaintiff remained the owner of the chattel, with the possession or property rights interrupted or interfered with. In this case, the plaintiff must accept the chattel back when it was tendered. Recovery was limited to any damage to the chattel, or from the interruption of property rights.

In the time of Bracton, despite the generality of the writ, the bailor of a chattel could only bring this action against the bailee of the chattel, or those who represent the bailee by testate or intestate succession. Only two actions were available. The plaintiff could claim, "I lost the goods and you found them"; or "I bailed the chattel to you." The first of these was called detinue sur trover.

There is some evidence that the action had been used in the generation following Bracton during the reign of Edward I of England. In earlier times, the finder who did not take the witness of his neighbors that he had honestly found the chattel was at risk of an actio furti.

In those days, action in detinue sur trover could not lie against a third party. If a person bailed his chattels to another, and that bailee wrongfully gave, sold or bailed the chattels to a third party, the only action was against the original bailee. Liability to the third bailee was not transferable. In later times, lawyers would talk of trover and bailment. In 1292, there was a slight tendency to regard the detainer rather than the bailment as the gist of the action, where it was stated "it is not enough to say, 'you did not bail to me' [in defense], but one must add, 'and I do not detain it [use of the chattel] from you.'" But there are other later cases which show that it is impossible or at least extremely difficult for the bailor to fashion any count that will avail him against the third party. The third party was called the "third hand".

Sir William Holdsworth described trover as an extension of detinue, which enabled not only a bailor and a dispossessed owner, but also a third person, to whose use goods had been bailed, to get full recognition of their interests.

In colonial America, replevin was used more often than detinue. In England the scope of replevin was usually limited to action in distress (where a chattel had been taken by a person who intended to hold it as a bargaining chip to force some action by the true owner).

By the end of the seventeenth century, the great bulk of litigation in England was conducted through the various forms of action which had developed from trespass. This remained the case until the nineteenth century, when these kinds of forms of action were abolished in succession by statute. By 1875, all remaining forms had been replaced by a single form uniform writ whereby the plaintiff endorses the statement for a claim. By that time, the change was purely procedural, but it also freed the substantive law from the old medieval forms of action. It permitted the development of broad concepts, such as liability in tort which could never have come about when confined by the old forms of action, such as trover. This served to rationalize the law. Just as forms of assumpsit replaced debt, so in the seventeenth century trover replaced detinue.

In the reign of Edward IV of England, the question arose whether a charter relating to land could be recovered by detinue, as it had no value.

== Defects in detinue sur trover ==
During the fifteenth century the plea of "detinue sur trover" gave rise to a special form of action of detinue, which came to be distinguished from the action of trespass on the case and its companion, trespass on the case sur trover. After a time, the latter became known simply as "trover". Littleton called the plea "per inventionem, sur trover, a new found halliday." This remark by Littleton probably only applied to the simpler form of the new pleading, which made it unnecessary to allege by what means the chattel had come into the hands of the defendant. It was not really the novelty of the action, but the fact that it streamlined the old writs by-passing the details of possession by the bailee or finder of the chattel.

For a time during the fifteenth century, the common law courts seemed to draw a real distinction between the counts detinue sur trover and detinue sur bailment. A bailment occurs when there is an agreement for someone to transport or keep a chattel. The normal rule was that "ordinary" care was necessary to protect the chattel while it was in the custody of the bailee. The former was a wrongful detention and a tortious wrong. The latter a wrong based on the agreement between the parties.

=== Wager of law ===
Wager of law was a possible defense, at least in certain cases of detinue sur trover. Wager of law was a complicated medieval legal procedure which was used when other forms of proof were lacking. It involved the bringing forth of witnesses who would swear under oath, to God that the facts alleged in the writ or bill of complaint were true. Lacking such witnesses, the action would fail. This was locked into the old methods of proof, which were in turn, tied to the old forms of action. The records show a certain hardening of the courts toward this defense in the mid-fourteenth century. Wager of law was not used in debt on a covenant. Wager of law was abolished by statute in 1833. Prosser describes trover and wager of law in this way: Trover, as it developed, had certain definite procedural advantages over the older forms of action, not the least of which was that it avoided wager of law, a form of licensed perjury which made detinue singularly unattractive to an honest plaintiff suing a dishonest defendant.

=== Damaged chattel returned ===
No action could lay when a chattel was returned, but in a damaged condition. In 1478, Catesby said, "And in the same manner I deliver my robes to you to keep for me and you wear them so that they perish, I shall have an action of detinue for in these cases the property is not altered, and afterwards an action on the case and recover damages for the loss sustained by your using the clothes."

=== Destruction of the chattel ===
It was doubtful whether detinue lay where, after bailment, a third party had destroyed the chattel bailed. This could be encountered when ships were lost at sea, or chattels being moved by wagon were destroyed by acts of nature and the like. Other cases might involve the finding or bailment of clothing which were destroyed while in the possession of a bailee. The case of a horse bailed to a smith, who bailed it to another smith who damaged, or killed the horse was encountered with some frequency. Action could not lie against the first smith. Contrary opinion is found in a ruling by Stratham.

== Trover as a branch of assumpsit ==
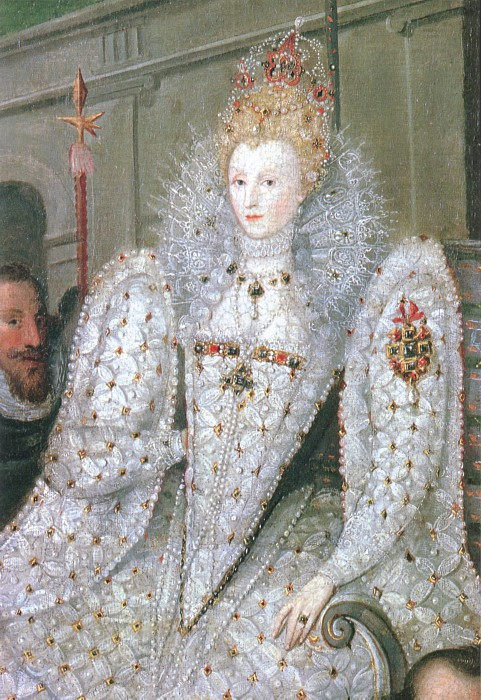
Action in trover became fully defined during the reign of Elizabeth I of England.

Trover has been described as an action in assumpsit which arose from the quare writs by adding the cum (Latin: "with") which, then could allege that the defendant undertook (assumpsit, "assumed the risk", or "assumed the duty"), to do something. Another clause which followed some time later contained the allegation of trover, and deals with situations which involved neither bailment nor a trespassory taking. In Bracton's day the appeal of larceny could be changed into an action de re adirata by omitting the words of felony. By this means a chattel could be recovered against a finder. If the finder refused in court to restore the chattel as adirata, the plaintiff could refile the claim ("claims afresh"), this time adding the word felony, indicating the action was for a real theft, and conversion.

Actions of this kind were common in the manorial courts, but an obscure note in a Year Book suggests that in 1294 detinue could be brought against a finder of a chattel. Cases of lost cattle had their own law, and never fit into the forms of trover. Detinue against the finder of a charter seems to have found its way into the common law by 1389.

Charters, like stray cattle, had their own law with peculiar features, and these actions dealt primarily with executors who withheld the heir's title deeds which came into their hands (devenerunt ad manus) with the ancestor's chattels. In 1455 Littleton explained the "new found haliday" which consisted in counting upon the finding (invencio) instead of the traditional devenerunt.

The preoccupation of detinue with the two special cases of stray cattle and lost title-deeds persisted, and the general problem of recovering chattels which had neither been stolen or bailed was only solved with a new form of writ. This was invented by adding a novel preamble to be inserted in the writ ostensurus quare. This preamble alleged that the plaintiff casually lost possession of the chattel, that the defendant had found it, refused to restore it and converted it to his own use. The full development of trover and conversion is seen by 1510. A discussion of more modern cases of a bailee (holder) in possession of a title-deed is found in Columbia Law Review.

In 1585, Edward Coke was reluctant to allow the principle of conversion to be extended so as to enable detinue to be largely superseded by trover on the case. Coke laid down the first principles applicable to conversion. He pointed out that the finder had acquired the goods which were in no danger of being lost, there was earlier authority for saying that an action for trespass could be sustained and that non-delivery constituted conversions. Consequently, the wrongful refusal to deliver on demand because evidence of a conversion, and this, after some vacillation is now the law. It was a rivalry between the various courts developing legal systems of the country which gave an impetus to the growth of the more modern remedies.

Trover became the accepted action for all wrongs to chattels. In the case of Cooper v. Chitty (see infra), Lord Mansfield said, "In form, trover is a fiction; in substance a remedy to recover the value of personal chattels wrongly converted by another to his own use. The form supposes a defendant may have come lawfully by the possession of the goods." The fiction was the allegation that the finding in trover was an accident. It was the plaintiff who wanted return of the chattel, which had been converted to the use of the defendant.

== English case law in trover ==
=== Two sub-bailee cases (intermediate bailee) ===
During the reign of Edward IV of England, there were two cases indicating that there was a remedy for damage done by an intermediate bailee (sub-bailee). In 1473, the weight of opinion of the judges allowed an action for damages due to the use of a sub-bailee. In this case the plaintiff made a bailment to the defendant to keep goods for him. The defendant's bailee used and damaged them. This action was thought to be similar to trespass, since the bailees had no right to the use of the chattels, but it was not a trespass since there was no interference with the chattels while they were in the possession of the plaintiff. Nor was there detinue, since there was no lawful detention.

In 1479, the remedy was extended to cover the destruction of the chattel by the possessor. The court allowed the action arising out of a bailment of a box containing some silver fixtures. It was alleged that the box had been broken open and the silver converted. The plaintiff could not recover the thing bailed, because it was destroyed. This was the first known case in which the words, "converted to his own use" (Latin: "convert a son oeps") were used. Judge Brian said, "and I take it for clear law that he could not have action on the case if he can recover the thing intself." Notice the similarity to the fact patterns seen in cases of "breaking the bail".

=== Statham, Accion sur le Cas, 1433 ===
This is a fragmentary case from Henry VI of England which indicates that there were sacks of flour left by the plaintiff to be stored and cared for by the defendant. The plaintiff had paid the defendant for this arrangement. The sacks of flour had been carried off by a third party. Counsel for the defence argued that action on the case did not lie, because detinue lay. Judge Prisot opined it was an action on the case. An action similar to trover was allowed.

=== Keilw. 160, pl.2 1510 ===
In 1510 the judges held that a bailee "had misdemeaned himself" where he had possession of a chattel and wrongfully sold the same to a stranger. An action on the case lay. Similar results are seen.

=== Year Book 7, Henry VI, M., f. 6, pl.9 1428 ===
One of the difficulties in extending action on the case further than a supplementary remedy to detinue lay in the unwillingness of the judges before 1585 to uphold an action on a new writ where a remedy already existed, such as in detinue. In the fifteenth century some overlapping between the forms of debt, detinue, account and trespass had been recognized. Judge Paston said in 1428, that it was a bad argument that a writ of debt could not lie where trespass did; because for the same thing one may have a writ of account and a writ of debt.

=== Isaac v. Clark, 1614 ===
In the case Isaac v Clark (1614) 2 Bulstr 306 312–313, it was laid down that a bailor could not maintain trover or detinue where he had pledged the goods, because the wrong was an offense against the possession of the bailee.

=== Manders v Williams 1849 ===
This principle of Isaac v Clark (see immediately supra) was extended in Manders v. Williams (1849) 4 Ex 339 where the court found that a bailee had a bailment for a period of time, and not merely at the will of the bailor. In other words, there had to be an agreement, similar to a contractual arrangement.

=== Mulgrave v Ogden 1591 ===
Case involved twenty barrels of butter found and taken into the custody of the defendant. Plaintiff alleged the defendant's negligence had left the butter in a ruined condition. The court found that the loss arising from the negligence of an accidental finder was not allowed to constitute a cause of action, for no law compelleth him that finds a thing to keep it safely; as if a man finds a garment and suffers it to be moth eaten. It would be otherwise if there had been a misuse.

=== Eason v Newman 1595 ===
In Eason v Newman (1595) Cro Elizabeth 495, a finder of a chattel was held liable on the ground that he had wrongfully refused to return it to the true owner. There was some judicial opposition to this ruling. It was criticized and precedent was not followed.

=== Case of the Chancellor of Oxford 1614 ===
In The Case of the Chancellor of Oxford (1614) 10 CR 56, a wrongful refusal to return a chattel was found to be evidence of a conversion.

=== Holdsworth's Case 1638 ===
In Holdsworth's Case Clayt. 151, pl. 99, 1638, an attempt to bring an action in trover for the wrongful detention of chattels by a bailee failed, because the action sounded in detinue and not trover.

=== Strafford v Pell 1650 ===
In Strafford v. Pell Clayt. 151, pl. 276, 1650, a similar action in trover as in Holdsworth's Case failed against a carrier of chattels for this was a declaration of a trover, and "supposeth a losing of goods, where the carrier hath them by delivery." Neither of these actions had anything to differentiate them from the old action of detinue, because both were based on a nonfeasance, before the character of conversion had been adequately realized.

=== Sykes v Walls 1675 ===
In Sykes v Walls (1675) 3 Keb 282, a claim of wrongful detention by a bailee was upheld as a good claim on the ground that a refusal to deliver up constituted a "misfeasance". By this case, trover became virtually concurrent with detinue. When a chattel had been found, and there was a subsequent refusal to deliver it to the owner, it was taken as evidence that a conversion had occurred. Trover was a wrong against the right of possession and not against the possession itself, because possession was prima facie in the wrong-doer. Even when trover was allowed to overlap trespass and replevin, which were concerned with possession, it remained necessary to define conversion, and this extension did not really affect the definition. Conversion became any act on the part of the defendant inconsistent with the plaintiff's right to possession. This right had parts: it had to be (1) absolute and (2) immediate.

The medieval conception of wrongs to chattels was based upon a physical interference with possession. This was inherent in an age when keeping the peace was the primary concern of law, and a right of a third party was foreign to it. Originally, trover was based on an infringement of possession other than trespass. All that was necessary for the medieval judge to decide the case was to determine who had the better right to claim a chattel, not necessarily the best right.

=== Armory v Delamirie 1722 ===
Armory v Delamirie (1722) 1 Str 505, is a case which is frequently cited in United States Tort Law texts as the primary illustration of action in trover. A chimney sweep found a jewel while cleaning a chimney. He took it to a jeweler for evaluation. The jeweler removed the stone from the setting, with the intention of selling it to a third party. The chimney sweep was entitled to recover damages from the loss of the jewel. The case illustrates several pertinent issues with trover. First, the chimney sweep was not the primary owner of the jewel. Since the original owner could not be identified, the chimney sweep was the best owner. He had superior rights to the stone over the jeweler. The actions of the jeweler constituted a conversion. The possession by the chimney sweep was prima facie proof of ownership. A similar result was seen in Jeffries v Great Western Ry (1856) 5 EB 802 (QB) 805.

=== Dockwray v Dickinson 1697 ===
In Dockwray v Dickinson (1697) Skinner 640, it was held that where the facts indicated a conversion of a ship and cargo that the plaintiff was entitled to interest in one-sixteenth of the value of the property. It was noted that one partner could not bring an action in trover against another partner. The plaintiff was not entitled to damages for the whole ship and cargo which was converted, but only the percentage which he owned. This was one-sixteenth. Selling the ship and cargo was a different situation than one where the ship was converted and subsequently destroyed. If a joint owner of a cargo ship sell the ship and cargo with the consent of the other joint owners, there is a severance of tenancy, and upon delivery, a severance of property. The buyer may bring action in trover. If one of the partners forcibly takes the ship, and it is subsequently lost in a storm in the West Indies, it is considered a destruction of the ship. Action in trover can be allowed.

=== Blainfield v March 1702 ===
Blainfield v March (1702) 7 Mod 141, allowed a plea in defense to trover brought by an administrator based on his own possession, that there was a will and an executor, whose claim would take priority to that of an administrator.

=== Cooper v Chitty 1756 ===
In this case, Lord Mansfield stated, "Two things are necessary to be proved to entitle the plaintiff to recover in this kind of action (trover): first the property (i.e. ownership) in the plaintiff; and secondly, a wrongful conversion by the defendant."

=== Richards v Jenkins 1886 ===
"A bankrupt plaintiff may be met by the plea that his trustee in bankruptcy has a real title." Nevertheless, the right of a third party would not be a protection against an action for an interference with the actual possession, because this would be a trespass, and trover would be a substitute for trespass. The action decided the better claim to ownership, and not the final question of ownership. It was a decision of "immediate" ownership, and not final ownership.

=== Gordon v Harper 1796 ===
Judge Ashurst said that, "in order to maintain trover the plaintiff must have a right of property in the thing (ownership) and a right of possession, and unless both these rights concur, the action (of trover) will not lie." Trover was not a strictly proprietary remedy.

=== Bishop v Viscountess Montague 1601 ===
In the case of Bishop v Viscountess Montague (1601) Cro Eliz 824, the opinion was offered that the plaintiff could elect between action in trover and action in trespass as a remedy for wrongful taking.

=== Kinaston v Moore 1627 ===
In this case, the judges allowed action to be brought in trover where there had been a wrongful taking of a chattel. "For the losing is but a surmise and not material, for the defendant may take it in the presence of the plaintiff." (Compare with the dictum of Lord Mansfield in Cooper v Chitty, supra.) "Although he take it as a trespass yet the other may charge him in an action upon the case of trover." (The choice is left to the plaintiff to choose action in trover or action in trespass.)

=== Hodges v Sampson 1662 ===
In this case, it was said that action in trover was in the nature of a trespass and where goods were taken, it was in the election of the party (plaintiff) whether to bring action in trespass or trover. This rule was followed in a long line of cases into the nineteenth century.

=== Mires v Solibay 1677 ===
The opinion in this case was that mere damage to a chattel was not a good claim in trover.

=== Bushel v Miller 1718 ===
Asportation of the chattel (illegally transporting the chattel) which was followed by the loss of a chattel, was held not to support an action in trover.

=== Fouldes v Willoughby 1841 ===
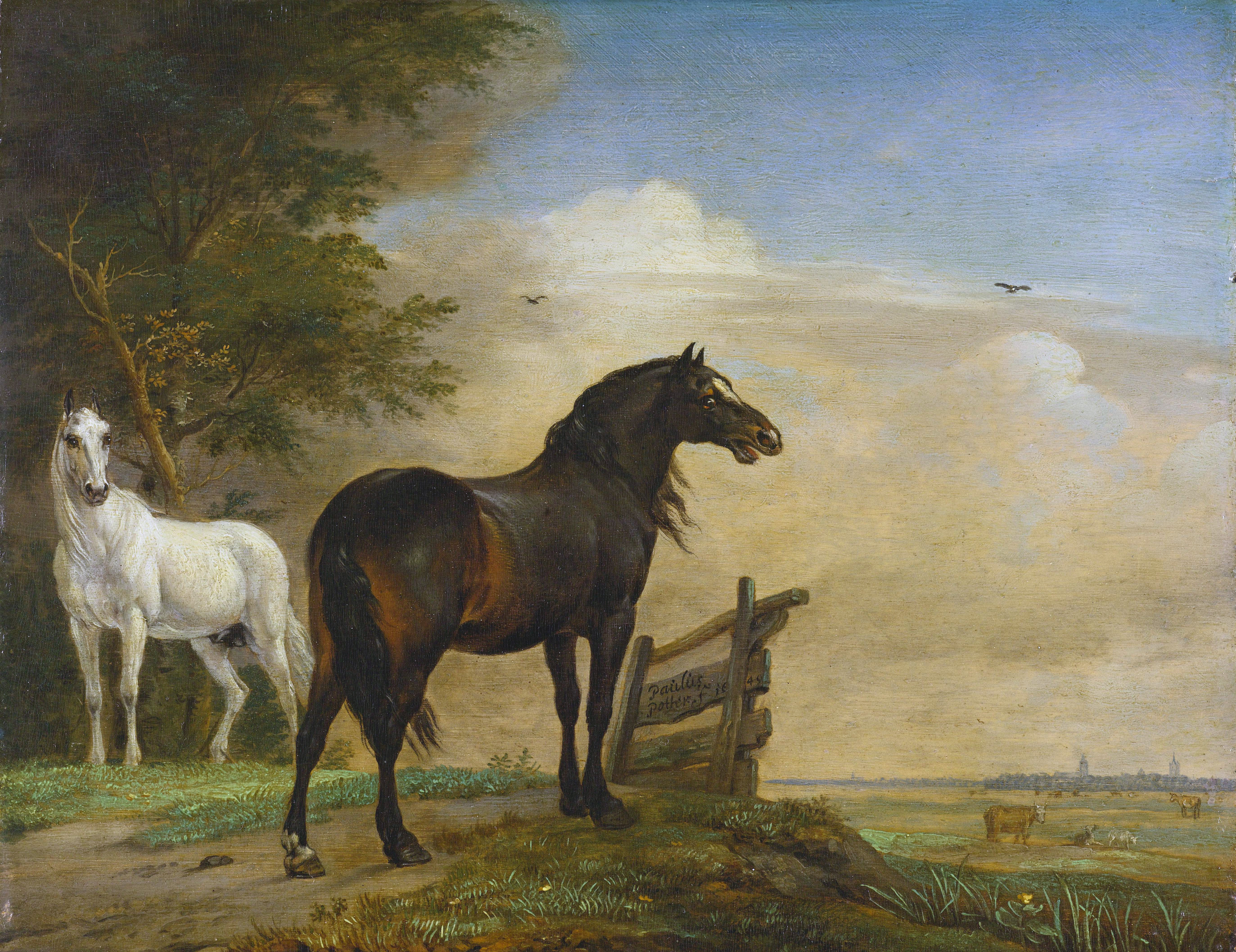
The case of Fouldes v Willoughby involved bailment of two horses let loose from a river ferry (actual horses in the case not pictured)

In the 1841 case of Fouldes v Willoughby (1841) 8 M & W 540, a ferryman was sued for conversion by the owner of two horses which he had put on board to be carried across a river. The ferryman subsequently refused to carry them, and when the owner declined to take them back on shore, the ferryman turned them loose on the landing place. The owner remained aboard the ferry. He made no attempt to retrieve his horses, which were subsequently lost to him. It was argued that this was an interference with the possession of the horses, and would be a trespass. It was a mere asportation without any conversion or interference with rights of ownership, since the action in putting the horses ashore had recognized the right owner. Consequently, the court held that trover was not an appropriate remedy. This was a signal case which brought into sharp distinction the alternate theories of trespass and trover. Trespass was the appropriate action, but it was not a conversion. This case was decided two years before the case of Johnson v Weedman (see infra) in which Abraham Lincoln successfully argued that a bailee who rode a horse for 15 miles had not incurred enough damage to invoke an action in trover. This case was likely a precedent to Johnson v Weedman.

=== Tinkler v Poole 1770 ===
In Tinker v Poole (1770) 5 Burr 2657, Lord Mansfield overcame the technical objections (traditionally held) that a distress (holding of a chattel to induce an action from the owner) was not a disposition of goods, and that trover could be an alternative to replevin. This was a controversial opinion at the time, and was not necessarily viewed as legitimate stare decisis.

=== Shipwick v Blanchard 1795 ===
The ruling and opinion of Lord Mansfield became permanent law with this case. Action in trover could be an alternative to replevin.

== English cases of trover applied to trusts ==
=== Ex P Pease ===
There are a few English cases where trover was applied to trusts. These are rare. In Ex P Pease a person who had received a bill of exchange for collection (an indorsee for collection) refused to return the bill to the person who had passed it to him (the indorser). The substitution of trover for equiatable remedy allowed in this case was anomalous.

=== Tancred v Allgood 1859 ===
Since an action in trover depended upon the title to immediate possession, the action could not be brought if the owner was not entitled to such possession because he had hired out a chattel for a fixed period. Ownership of the chattel was recognized in other instances, such as transfer at death. The basis of liability was permanent injury to the "reversion", that is the right to receive the chattel unimpaired at some future date. The principle was mentioned in Tancred, but not applied because of the fact pattern of the case. It was finally established a few years later.

=== Mears v L & S W Ry 1862 ===
As it developed, the wrong might arise from injury caused either by negligence or by an act of trespass or conversion.

== Trover cases in the United States ==
Trover is the name of the action which lay, at common law, for the recovery of damages for the conversion of personal property in his possession, usually involving chattels held in bailment. Although the old forms of action have been abolished or disappeared under modern civil procedure in the United States, the common law action for conversion still exists in fact, if not in form. (Extensive case law is reviewed.)

A person who purchases personal property from one not authorized to sell the chattel may be held liable for the conversion of the article. This is regardless of the fact that the purchaser was honestly mistaken, or acted innocently, in good faith and without knowledge of the seller's lack of authority to make the sale. This rule also holds in cases where the purchaser takes possession of the goods, mixes them with his own property, holds them to his own use, refuses to surrender possession on demand, disposes of the goods to a third person by sale, lease or bailment or in general exercises rights of ownership as to the property purchased in denial of the real owner's rights after knowledge of the rights of the true owner.

=== Deaderick v. Oulds, 1887 ===
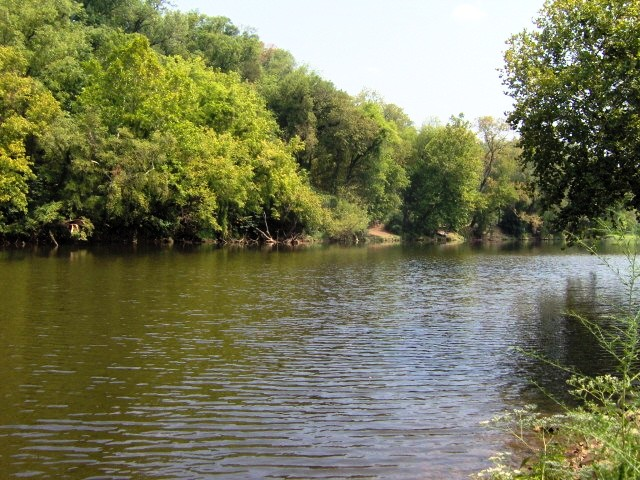
The case of Deaderick v. Oalds involved an action in trover for recovery of a log floated down a Tennessee River.

In the 1887 case of Deaderick v. Oulds, the Supreme Court of Tennessee ruled on a case of trover. The defendant, Oulds, cut 800 walnut logs, branded them with the letter "D", then proceeded to float them down a river with the intention of recovering them downstream. Sometime later, Oulds found an unmarked log among his other marked logs which had peculiar cracks at one end. He floated the unmarked log down the river, and it washed up on an island owned by the plaintiff, Deaderick, who then claimed the log as his in trover or replevin. The Tennessee court quoted the English case of Bridges v. Hawkesworth where the plaintiff, being in the shop of the defendant, picked up a parcel containing bank notes. The defendant, at the request of the finder, took charge of the notes, to hold for the owner. After three years, no one had come forth to claim them. The defendant shop owner refused to deliver them to the plaintiff. The court held the defendant shop owner liable in trover for the notes.

The Tennessee Supreme Court observed it is essential in cases of trover, that the property must be found; it must at the time when the finder came upon it, to have been in such a situation as to clearly indicate that it was lost. It cannot have been placed there by the original owner who lost it by carelessness or forgetfulness, where it was later found by someone else. In such cases, the owner of the premises where the property is found is treated as a quasi-bailee (i.e. he holds the property for the original owner), and he may maintain trover against the finder. Since the log was not intentionally laid by the (unknown) owner on the land of the plaintiff (Deaderick), and hence he was not a quasi-bailee for the owner, he cannot hold against the superior right of the defendant (Oulds) arising out of his prior possession and earlier finding of the log. Judgment for ownership of the log was to the defendant Oulds.

=== Berry v. Jackson 1902 ===
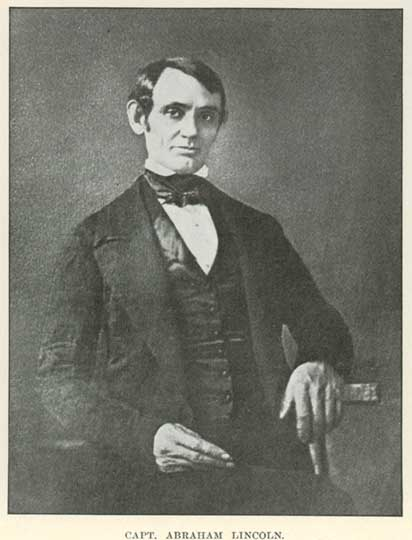
Abraham Lincoln successfully defended a case in trover where a bailed horse had been ridden by the bailee, in the case of Johnson v. Weedman.

In the Georgia case of Berry v. Jackson, 115 Ga. 196, 41 S.E. 698 (Ga. 1902), recovery of property converted may be allowed in an action of trover where such is statutorily defined.

=== Mitchell v. Georgia & A. R. Co. ===
In the case of Mitchell v. Georgia & A. R. Co. it was noted that where action in trover is allowed by statute, and defined by such, it necessarily includes all three actions of trover, detinue and replevin.

=== Abraham Lincoln's case of trover: Johnson v. Weedman, 1843 ===
The 1843 Illinois case of Johnson v. Weedman was argued by a young Abraham Lincoln. The case was somewhat similar to the case of Fouldes v Willoughby (1841) 8 M & W 540, which had been decided two years earlier. It may have been taken as precedent in this present case. (see supra). A horse had been left in bailment for proper care. The bailee who was in possession of the horse rode it for 15 miles. There was no demonstrable damage to the horse. Lincoln convinced the court that there could be no action for damages. There was not enough evidence for the bailee to be held liable for a conversion, or for an action in trover. There had been no significant invasion of the owner's rights. The Illinois court agreed, and Lincoln won the day.

== Typical case patterns of conversion in modern quasi-trover ==
=== Zaslow v. Kroenert, California, 1946 ===
In Zaslow v. Kroenert, 29 Cal.2d 541, 176 P.2d 1 (Cal. 1946), the California Supreme Court decided the case of quasi-trover with the following facts. Plaintiff Zaslow and defendant Kroenert owned a house as tenants in common. A dispute arose over the ownership of the house. The defendant and her agent entered the house, and changed the locks. They placed Zaslow's property in storage. Zaslow was notified of the placement of his property in storage, and its location. Plaintiff Zaslow sued and prevailed in an action of conversion. The California Supreme Court ruled that merely placing furniture in storage was not a conversion. There was no evidence that any damage had occurred to the furniture in storage. The case was remanded to the trial court to determine damages caused by the ouster and trespass of the personal property.

=== Electric Power Co. v. Mayor of New York, 1899 ===
In Electric Power Co. v. Mayor of New York, 36 App. Div. 366, 55, N. Y. S. 460, 1899, the same fact pattern as in Zaslow v. Kroenert, supra, was encountered. Here, the furniture was placed in a warehouse at a distance so the plaintiff was subject to substantial inconvenience and expense in recovering. This was ruled to be a conversion. The case was similar to an 1816 British case, Forsdick v Collins.

=== Hicks Rubber Co. Distributors v. Stacy, Texas, 1939 ===
In the 1939 Texas case, the court encountered the same facts as in Zaslow v. Kroenert, except the defendant stored the furniture in his own name with the intent to keep it for himself. This was ruled to be a conversion.

=== McCurdy v. Wallblom Furniture & Carpet Co., Minnesota, 1905 ===
In McCurdy v. Wallblom Furniture & Carpet Co., 84 Minn. 326, 102 N.W. 873 (Minn. 1905), the Minnesota court encountered the same fact pattern as in Zaslow v. Kroenert, except that while the furniture was in the warehouse, and before the plaintiff could remove it, it was destroyed by a fire. This was ruled to be a conversion.

=== Borg & Powers Furniture Co. v. Reiling, Minnesota, 1943 ===
In Borg & Powers Furnuture Co., 213 Minn. 539, 7 N.W.2d 310 (Minn. 1943), a fact pattern similar to Zaslow v. Kroenert existed, except the defendant did not notify the plaintiff. This was ruled to be a conversion.

== Criminal trover ==
The Penal Code of the State of Connecticut contains the offense of "criminal trover", in the first or second degree. It involves unauthorized use of a vehicle or other property of another person.

== See also ==
- Bailment
- Conversion (law)
- Detinue
- Haslem v. Lockwood
- Replevin
- Trespass to chattels
