= Haslem v. Lockwood =

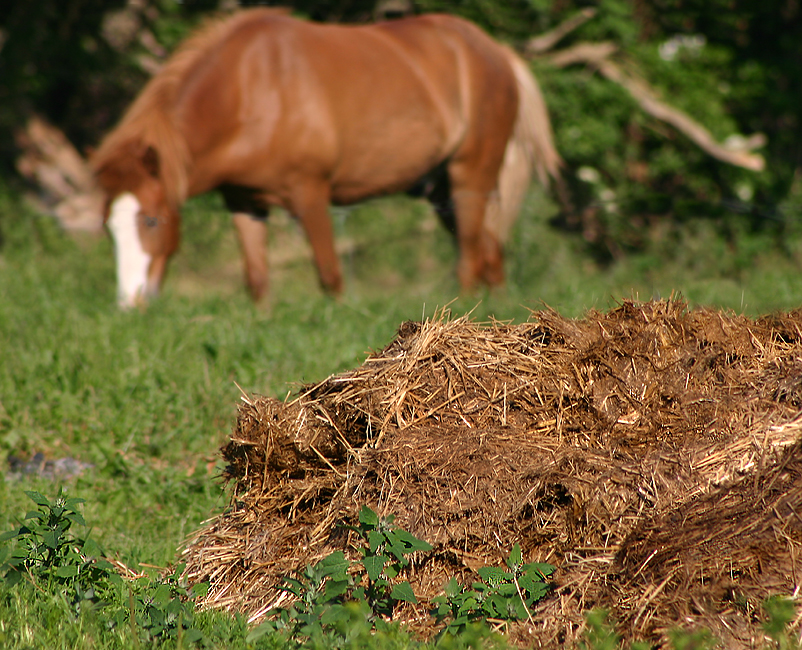
- Court: Connecticut Appellate Court
- Full case name: Thomas Haslem v. William A. Lockwood
- Citations: 37 (Conn.) 500 Connecticut, (1871)

Case opinions
- Judge Park

Keywords
- Conversion, property, tort, conversion, trover, nuisance

Thomas Haslem v. William A. Lockwood, Connecticut, (1871) is an important United States case in property, tort, conversion, trover and nuisance law.

The plaintiff directed his servants to rake abandoned horse manure into heaps that had accumulated in a public street, intending to carry it away the next day. Before he could do so, the defendant, who had no knowledge of the plaintiff's actions, found the heaps and hauled them off to his own land. The plaintiff sued the defendant in trover demanding payment for the price of the manure. The trial court held for the defendant, stating he owed nothing to the plaintiff. The plaintiff appealed and the Appellate Court of Connecticut held for the plaintiff, remanding the case for a new trial.

The manure originally belonged to the owners of the horses that dropped it. But when the owners abandoned it on the road, it became the property of the man who was first to claim it. The Court found that the best owner after the act of abandonment was the borough of Stamford, Connecticut where the manure was found. In the absence of a claim to the manure by the officials of Stamford, the plaintiff was entitled to it by reason of trover. The plaintiff was entitled to damages because the defendant had committed a conversion. The manure had not become a part of the real estate, as the defendant had argued. It remained separate and unattached to the land, and hence was not part of the fee of estate. Comparing manure to seaweed and laws in the 19th century having to do with the scraping into piles of natural things of this sort, the court held that 24 hours was a reasonable time for the defendant to wait to take the manure. That by this standard, and the fruits of his labour of raking into piles, the plaintiff was granted a new trial over the issue of damages.

== Issues ==
1. Is manure abandoned on a road by passing horses property subject to the laws of trover?
2. Does manure abandoned on the road by passing horses become a part of the land, and in essence attached to it as part of the fee of ownership?
3. Does a person who gathers the manure into heaps improve it, and hence have claim to ownership?
4. Does a third party who happens by and takes as his own the manure which has been placed in heaps by another commit a conversion?
5. If the third party is guilty of committing a conversion, what are the damages to the plaintiff?

== Facts ==
A case in trover for a quantity of manure, brought before a justice of the peace and appealed by the defendant to the Court of Common Pleas for the county of Fairfield, and tried in that court, on the general issue concerning the matter of ownership of the manure before Justice Brewer.

At trial it was proved that the plaintiff employed two men to gather into heaps, on the evening of April 6, 1869, some manure that lay scattered on the ground along the side of a public highway. Most of this manure was from horses passing by. The men continued their efforts through the town of Stamford, Connecticut. They started at 6 PM and by 8 PM, their efforts had resulted in eighteen heaps, which was enough to fill six cart-loads. While the heaps consisted largely of manure, there were also traces of soil, gravel and straw which are commonly seen along roadways. The defendant saw the piles the next morning. He inquired of the town warden to whom they belonged, and if he had given permission to anyone for their removal. The town warden did not know to whom the manure belonged and had not given permission to anyone for the removal. Learning this, the defendant removed the manure to his own land, where it was scattered on a field.

The plaintiff and defendant both averred that they had received permission from the warden to claim the manure. But testimony revealed that neither had any authority from any town official in Stamford for the removal. Neither plaintiff while gathering, nor the defendant while removing the heaps was interfered with or opposed by any one. The removal of the manure was calculated to improve the appearance and health of the borough. The manure was worth one dollar per cart full, six dollars in all. The plaintiff, upon learning that the defendant had taken the manure, demanded he pay six dollars. Defendant refused the demand. Neither litigant owned any of the land adjacent to the road.

On the above facts, the plaintiff prayed the court to rule that the manure was the personal property of the owners of the horses, and had been abandoned. By piling the manure into heaps, the plaintiff claimed ownership in trover. The only person who could reasonably have a greater claim to the manure would be the owner of the land in fee, and that barring any claim by the land owner, the plaintiff was the rightful owner.

The defendant claimed that the manure being dropped and spread out over the surface of the earth was a part of the real estate, and belonged to the owner of the fee, subject to a public easement; that the fee was either the borough of Stamford or the town of Stamford, or in the parties who owned lands adjacent; that therefore the scraping up of the manure, mixed with the soil, if real estate, did not change its nature to that of personal estate, unless it was removed, whether the plaintiff had consent of the owner of the fee or not; and that unless the heaps become personal property, the plaintiff could not maintain his action. The defendant further claimed that the plaintiff may have, indeed, turned the manure into a personal estate by the act of piling it up; but had abandoned his claim to the manure by leaving it unattended overnight and into the next day. This inattention was an abandonment of all rights to ownership of the manure. The trial court ruled adversely, and found for the defendant. The plaintiff had no property rights in the piles of manure. The plaintiff appeals this ruling to this court.

The case is appealed to this court, with the plaintiff seeking a new trial.

== Argument of the plaintiff-appellant ==
Curtis and Hoyt (Counsel for the plaintiff-appellant) offered the following arguments in their brief:

(1) The manure in question was the personal property abandoned by its owners. (The owners of the horses.)

(2) It never became a part of the real estate on which it was abandoned.

(3) It being personal property abandoned by its owners, and lying upon the highway, and neither the owners of the fee nor the proper authorities of the town and borough having by any act of theirs shown any intention to appropriate the same, it became lawful for the plaintiff to gather it up and remove it from the highway, providing he did not commit a trespass, and removed it without objection from the owners of the land. No trespass was in fact committed. No person was interfered with the plaintiff or made any objection. The court cannot presume a trespass to have been committed.

(4) But if the manure had become a part of the real estate, yet when it was gathered into heaps by the plaintiff it was severed from the realty and became personal estate. And being gathered without molestation from any person owning or claiming to own the land, it is to be considered as having been taken by tacit consent of such owner.

(5) The plaintiff therefore acquired not only a valid possession, but a title by occupancy, and by having expanded labor and money upon the property. Such a title is a good legal title against every person by the true owner.

(6) If the plaintiff had a legal title then he had the constructive possession. If he had legal possession, and only left the property for a short time intending to return and take it away, then he might maintain an action against a wrong doer for taking it away. The leaving of property for a short time, intending to return, does not constitute an abandonment. The property is still to be considered as in the possession of the plaintiff.

== Argument of the defendant-respondent ==
Olmstead (Counsel for the defendant-respondent), contra.

(1) The manure mixed with the dirt and ordinary scrapings of the highway, being spread out over the surface of the highway, was a part of the real estate, and belonged to the owner of the fee, subject to the public easement.

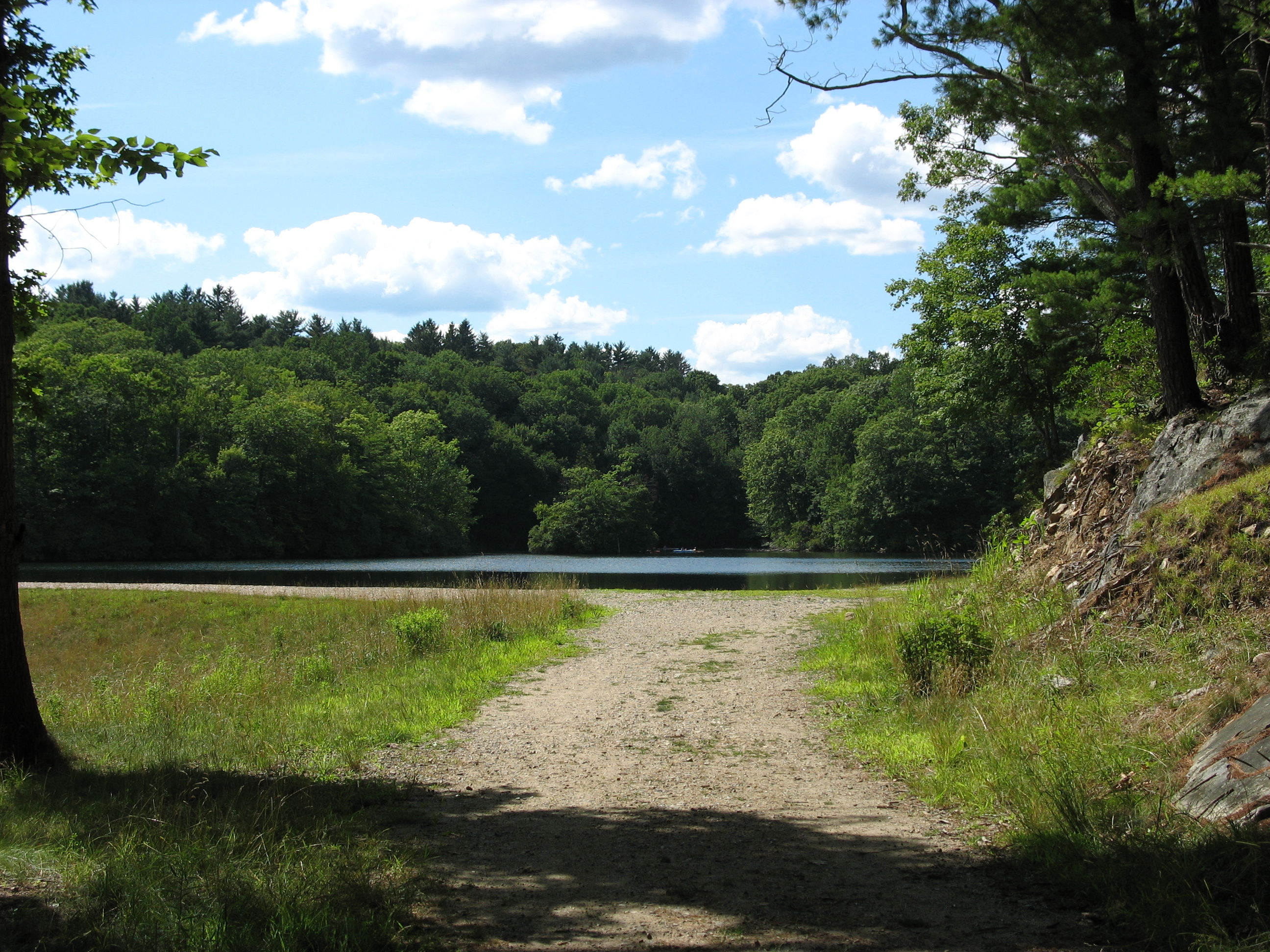
The defendant-respondent argued that abandoned horse manure had become a part of the real estate on which it was laid.

(2) The scraping up of the manure and dirt into piles, if the same was a part of the real estate, did not change its nature to that of personal property, unless there was a severance of it from the realty by removal, (which there was not), whether the plaintiff had the consent of the owner of the fee or not, which consent it is conceded the plaintiff did not have. (3) Unless the scraping up of the heaps made their substance personal property, the plaintiff could not maintain his action either for trespass or trespass on the case.

(4) In trespass de bonis asportatis, or trover, the plaintiff must have had the actual possession, or a right to the immediate possession, in order to recover.

(5) If the manure was always personal estate, it being spread upon the surface of the earth, it was in possession of the owner of the fee, who was not the plaintiff. The scraping of it into heaps, unless it was removed, would not change the possession from the owner of the fee to the plaintiff. The plaintiff therefore never had the possession.

(6) If the heaps were personal property the plaintiff never had any right in the property, but only mere possession, if anything, which he abandoned by leaving the same upon the public highway from 8 o'clock in the evening until 12 o'clock the next day, without leaving any notice on or about the property, or any one to exercise control over the same in his behalf.

== Opinion of the court ==
Opinion delivered by Judge Park.

We think the manure scattered upon the ground, under the circumstances of this case, was personal property. The cases referred to by the defendant to show that it was real estate are not on point. The principle of those cases is, that manure made in the usual course of husbandry upon a farm is so attached to and connected with the realty that, in the absence of any express stipulation to the contrary, it becomes appurtenant to it. The principle was established for the benefit of agriculture. It found its origin in the fact that it is essential to the successful cultivation of a farm that the manure, produced from the droppings of cattle and swine fed upon the products of the farm from the land should be used to supply the drain made upon the soil in the production of crops, which otherwise would become impoverished and barren; and in the fact the manure so produced is generally regarded by farmers in this country as a part of the realty and has been so treated by landlords and tenants from time immemorial.

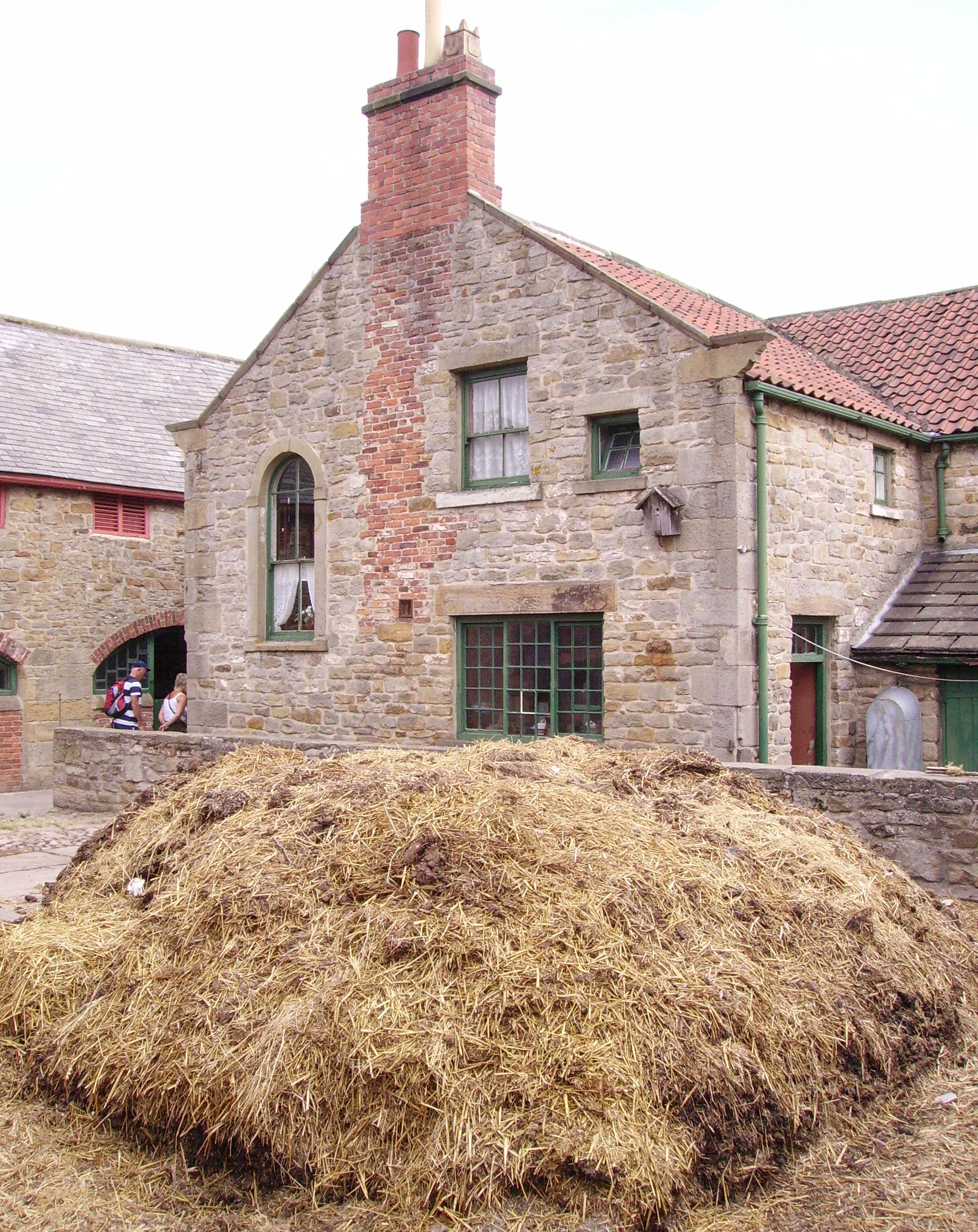
The court found the plaintiff had improved the manure by piling it up into heaps.

But this principle does not apply to the droppings of animals driven by travelers on the highway. The highway is not used, and cannot be used, for the purpose of agriculture. The manure is of no benefit whatsoever to it, but on the contrary is a detriment; and in cities and large villages it becomes a nuisance, and is removed by public officers at public expense. The finding in this case is, "that the removal of the manure and scrapings was calculated to improve the appearance and health of the borough." It is therefore evident that the cases relied upon by the defendant have no application to the case.

But it is said that if the manure was personal property, it was the possession of the owner of the fee, and the scraping it into heaps by the plaintiff did not change the possession, but it continued before, and that therefore the plaintiff cannot recover, for he neither had possession nor the right to the immediate possession.

The manure originally belonged to the travelers whose animals dropped it, but in being worthless to them was immediately abandoned; and whether it then became the property of the borough of Stamford which owned the fee of the land on which the manure lay, is unnecessary to determine; for if it did, the case finds that the removal of the filth would be an improvement to the borough, and no objection was made by any one to the use of that the plaintiff attempted to make of it. Considering the character of such accumulations upon highways, in cities and villages, and the light in which they are everywhere regarded in closely settled communities, we cannot believe at the borough in this instance would have had any objection to the act of the plaintiff in removing a nuisance that affected the public health and the appearance of the streets. At all events, we think facts of the case show a sufficient right in the plaintiff to the mediate possession of the property as against a mere wrong doer.

The defendant appears before the court in no enviable light. He does not pretend that he had a right to the manure, even when scattered upon the highway, superior to that of the plaintiff; but after the plaintiff had changed the original condition and greatly enhanced its value by his labor, he seized and appropriated to his own use the fruits of the plaintiff's outlay, and now seeks immunity from responsibility on the ground that the plaintiff was a wrong doer as well as himself. The conduct of the defendant is in keeping with his claim, and neither commends itself to the favorable consideration of the court. The plaintiff had the peaceable and quiet possession of the property; and we deem this sufficient until the borough of Stamford shall make complaint.

It is further claimed that if the plaintiff had a right to the property by virtue of occupancy, he lost the right when he ceased to retain the actual possession of the manure after scraping it into heaps.

We do not question the general doctrine, that where the right by occupancy exists, it exists no longer that the party retains the actual possession of the property, or till he appropriates it to his own use by removing it to some other place. If he leaves the property at the place where it was discovered, and does nothing whatsoever to enhance its value or change its nature, has right by occupancy is unquestionably gone. But the question is, if a party finds property comparatively worthless, as the plaintiff found the property in question, owing to its scattered condition upon the highway, and greatly increases it value by his labor and expense, does he lose his right if he leaves it a reasonable time to procure the means to take it away, when the means are necessary for its removal?

Suppose a teamster with a load of grain, while traveling the highway, discovers a rent in one of his bags, and finds that his grain is scattered upon the road for the distance of a mile. He considers the labor of collecting his corn of more value the property itself, and he therefore abandons it, and pursues his way. A afterwards finds the grain in this condition and gathers it kernel by kernel into heaps by the side of the road, and leaves it a reasonable time to procure the means necessary for its removal. While he is gone for his bag, B discovers the grain thus conveniently collected into heaps and appropriates it to his own use. Has A any remedy? If he has not, the law in this instance is open to just reproach. We think under such circumstances A would have a reasonable time to remove the property, and during such a reasonable time his right to it would be protected. If this is so, then the principle applies to the case under consideration.

A reasonable time for the removal of this manure had not elapsed when the defendant seized and converted it to his own use. The statute regulating the rights of parties in the gathering of sea-weed, gives the party who heaps it upon a public beach twenty-four hours in which to remove it, and that length of time for the removal of the property we think would not be unreasonable in most cases like the present one.

== Holding ==
We therefore advise the Court of Common Pleas to grant a new trial. In this opinion the other judges concurred.

== Discussion ==
The Connecticut Court found the argument of the defendant-respondent to be exceptionally weak in terms of the law. The idea that horse droppings abandoned along the road became a part of the real estate in fee is an interesting argument. But it was soundly rejected by the court. Even following this theory, the borough of Stamford, Connecticut would have been the new best owners of the manure. When the plaintiff-appellate began to rake the manure into neat piles for reclamation, he did it in clear sight of one or more of the officials of Stamford. Also, presumably, any citizen of the town could have observed him. No one objected to his activity, or came forward to claim superior rights to the manure. The plaintiff had "improved" what was otherwise a nuisance to the town. In this act, he also had some legal standing to claim a superior ownership to anyone else. The existing laws allowing persons who piled up seaweed to have a legitimate claim of possession for 24 hours was invoked. The court had nothing good to say about the defendant-respondent, stating he had not placed himself in an enviable light.

== See also ==
- conversion (law)
- trover
- nuisance

== External references ==
- Haslem v. Lockwood report
- Case Law article
- Alternative case law for Haslem v. Lockwood
