= Bailment =

Legal relationship in common law

Bailment is a legal relationship at common law, where the owner of personal property ("chattel") transfers physical possession of that property to another, who holds the property for a certain purpose, while the transferor retains ownership. The owner who surrenders custody of a property is called the "bailor" and the individual who accepts the property is called a "bailee". The bailee is the person who possesses the personal property for the owner for a set time (Note: Under English common law, a bailment need not be for a precise term, it can be "at will".) and for a precise reason and who delivers the property back to the owner when they have accomplished the purpose that was initially intended.

== General ==
Bailment is distinguished from a contract of sale or a gift of property, as it only involves the transfer of possession and not its ownership. To create a bailment, the bailee must both intend to possess, and actually physically possess, the bailable chattel, for example, a car mechanic business when a car has been dropped off for repair. Although a bailment relationship is ordinarily created by contract, there are circumstances where lawful possession by the bailee creates a bailment relationship without an ordinary contract, such as an involuntary bailment. A bailment relationship between the bailor and bailee is generally less formal than a fiduciary relationship.

In addition, unlike a lease or rental, where ownership remains with the lessor but the lessee is allowed to use the property, the bailee is generally not entitled to the use of the property while it is in his possession. However, a lease of personal property is the same as a bailment for hire, where the bailee gains the right to use the property.

A common example of bailment is leaving one's car with a valet. Leaving a car in an unattended parking garage, however, is typically a lease or license of a parking space rather than a bailment, as the garage does not take possession of (i.e. exercise dominion or control over) the car. However, bailments arise in many other situations, including terminated leases of property, warehousing (including store-it-yourself), or in carriage of goods.

=== Governing law ===
In the United States, bailments are frequently governed by statute. For example, the UCC regulates personal property leases. State bailment for hire statutes may also regulate the rights and duties of parties in the bailment relationship.

The Malay States' ordinance of 1950 on contracts stated that:

104. In all cases of bailment the bailee is bound to take as much care of the goods bailed to him as a man of ordinary prudence would, under similar circumstances, take of his own goods of the same bulk, quality, and value as the goods bailed.
105. The bailee, in the absence of any special contract, is not responsible for the loss, destruction, or deterioration of the thing bailed, if he has taken the amount of care of it described in s 104 of this Ordinance.

Bailment is a typical common law concept, although similar concepts exist in civil law.

"Sir William Jones has defined bailment to be 'a delivery of goods on a condition, express or implied, that they shall be restored by the bailee to the bailor, or according to his directions, as soon as the purpose for which they are bailed shall be answered.' He has again, in the closing summary of his essay, defined it in language somewhat different, as, 'A delivery of goods in trust, on a contract expressed or implied, that the trust shall be duly exercised and the goods re-delivered, as soon as the time or use for which they were bailed shall have elapsed or be performed.'"

— Wharton, J. (1867)

== Purposes ==
There are three types of bailments, based on the purpose of the relationship:

1. for the benefit of the bailor and bailee
2. for the sole benefit of the bailor; and
3. for the sole benefit of the bailee.

Examples

A bailment for the mutual benefit of the parties is created when there is an exchange of performances between the parties (e.g. a bailment for the repair of an item when the owner is paying to have the repair accomplished).

A bailor receives the sole benefit from a bailment when a bailee acts gratuitously (e.g. the owner leaves the precious item such as a car or a piece of jewelry in the safekeeping of a trusted friend while the owner is traveling abroad without any agreement to compensate the friend).

A bailment is created for the sole benefit of the bailee when a bailor acts gratuitously (e.g., the loan of a book to a patron, the bailee, from a library, the bailor).

== Damages ==
Plaintiffs will be able to sue for damages based on the duty of care. Often this will be normal tort damages. Plaintiff may elect also to sue for conversion, either in the replevin or trover, although these are generally considered older, common law damages. In US jurisdictions, the measure of care required by the bailee in a mutual benefit bailment is "ordinary care" or "due care".

== Terms ==
Bailment can arise in a number of situations and is often described by the type of relationship that gave rise to the bailment. Two common distinctions are:

- For consideration versus gratuitous. If a person agrees to accept a fee or other good consideration for holding possession of goods, they are generally, although not always, held to a higher standard of care than a person who is doing so without being paid (or receives no benefit). Consider a paid coat-check counter versus a free coat hook by the front door and the respective obligations of the bailee. Some establishments even post signs to the effect that "no bailment" is created by leaving your personal possessions in their care, but local laws may prevent unfair enforcement of such terms (especially attended car parks).
- Fixed-term versus indefinite-term. A bailor who leaves property for a fixed term may be deemed to have abandoned the property if it is not removed at the end of the term, or it may convert to an involuntary bailment for a reasonable time (e.g., abandoned property in a bank safe, eventually escheats to the state, and the treasurer may hold it for some period, awaiting the owner). However, if there is no clear term of bailment agreed upon, the goods cannot be considered abandoned unless the bailee is given notice that the bailor wishes to give up possession of the goods. Frequently, in the case of storage of goods, the bailee also acquires a contractual or statutory right to dispose of the goods to satisfy overdue rent.

== Cases ==
- Coggs v Bernard (1703) established that a bailment can exist even if it is gratuitous.

== See also ==
- Bail
- Trover
- Replevin
