= Replevin =

Ancient common law remedy

Replevin (/rɪˈplɛvɪn/) or claim and delivery (sometimes called revendication) is a legal remedy which enables a person to recover personal property taken wrongfully or unlawfully, and to obtain compensation for resulting losses.

== Etymology ==
The word "replevin" is of Anglo-Norman origin and is the noun form of the verb "replevy". This comes from the Old French replevir, derived from plevir ("to pledge"), which is derived from the Latin replegiare ("to redeem a thing taken by another").

== Nature ==
In The Law of Torts, John Fleming has written:

From medieval times, there has also come down to us a summary process, known as replevin, by which a man out of whose possession goods have been taken may obtain their return until the right to the goods can be determined by a court of law. Replevin arose out of the need of a turbulent society to discourage resort to self help and although for a long time primarily used in disputes about distress between landlord and tenant, it was gradually expanded to cover all cases of allegedly wrongful dispossession. If the plaintiff wanted return of his chattel in specie, replevin was a more appropriate remedy than either trespass or trover in which only damages could be recovered. Restoration of the property is, of course, only provisional, pending determination of title.

In common law, several types of action existed with respect to deprivation of possession (being subdivided into the wrongful taking of chattels and the unjust detention of them, even where the original taking was lawful):

- In the case of wrongful taking:
  - A writ of replevin was available only for an unlawful taking in the nature of a wrongful distress, where restitution could be made for the goods wrongfully taken (being in the nature of a redelivery of the pledge or the thing taken in distress) with damages for the loss sustained by such action. As distrained goods are in the custody of the law, any attempt to take them back by force without a writ of replevin could be contested by writ of rescous or de parco fracto, with a remedy in damages.
  - A writ of trespass vi et armis was available in the taking of goods, with a remedy in damages.
  - An action of trover and conversion was available for the non-forcible taking of goods, with a remedy in damages.
- In the case of unjust detention:
  - Replevin lay to recover goods still held after a tender of amends.
  - Detinue lay to recover lent goods where the holder refused to return them to the owner. However, the defendant was allowed to exculpate himself by oath, so this action was displaced by that of trover and conversion.

At common law, the ordinary action for the recovery of goods wrongfully taken was originally one of detinue, but no means of immediate recovery was possible until the action was tried. Replevin arose to deal with the matter of the illegal distress of goods for rent or damage feasant, in order to procure their restoration to the owner. Illegal distress has been held to occur where:

1. no relationship of landlord and tenant exists at all,
2. there is no demise at a fixed rent,
3. no rent is due, or none due to the person who has distrained,
4. goods have been released before the distress, or tendered before the impounding,
5. the entry was illegal, or
6. things privileged from distress (ie, neither goods nor chattel) have been seized.

Replevin will not lie where if any part of the rent claimed was due, but this defence is not effective where the only rent claimed by the landlord is not recoverable by distress.

It has been held that replevin applies to any wrongful taking of goods and chattel.

A party seeking relief may elect to adjudicate the right to possession prior to obtaining immediate relief to obtain the property in question. In such cases, replevin actions are still designed to afford the petitioning party a relatively speedy process for obtaining judgment, as compared to typical lawsuits. The summary remedy afforded by replevin statutes can be thwarted by defendants who contest the claimant's right to possession, by contesting the plaintiff's complaint, and insisting on traditional litigation involving discovery, and in some cases, trial by jury.

Replevin actions are often filed by secured creditors seeking to take possession of collateral securing loans or other debt instruments, such as retail installment contracts. A common example is where an automobile finance company initiates a replevin action to gain possession of a vehicle, following payment default. Replevin actions are usually employed when the lender cannot find the collateral, or cannot peacefully obtain it through self-help repossession. Replevin actions may also be pursued by true owners of property, e.g., consignors seeking return of consigned property that the party in possession will not relinquish for one reason or another.

Replevin is an action of civil law, not criminal law. Therefore, because of the differing standard of proof, a defendant found not guilty of criminal theft may nevertheless be required to return the disputed item or items in civil court.

Replevin does not provide compensation for any monetary loss arising from the loss of use of some income-producing property item. Replevin involves return of an actual specific item or items, not monetary compensation for loss. Thus, it would not normally be used in a case regarding a sum of money, as distinct from the loss of a rare coin, for instance, where the return of the actual coin itself was at issue. In occasional cases of no particular numismatic interest, however, e.g., a bag of money whose contents have not yet been counted, an action may be filed to recover the actual coins and/or bills in question if they are still together.

The question of replevin becomes moot should the item in question no longer exist as an entity, i.e. if it is destroyed, or in the case of a bag of money, for instance, if the money has been spent. For this reason, the item is normally seized by the court when the action is filed and held until the decision is reached to prevent the waste of a legal action over a nonexistent object and, further, to ensure that the item in question is not destroyed, spent, etc., during the action. This can be used to force a settlement from the defendant, just or unjust, as he or she is deprived of the use of the disputed object for the duration of the action; if this results in a financial loss, the defendant may find it advantageous to merely pay a relatively small settlement and have the item returned quickly.

Replevin remains the modern action, albeit defined by statute, for recovery of chattels pending a decision of the right of possession. It lies only where the possession was taken from the plaintiff, whether under colour of legal process or otherwise, by an act having the nature of a trespass.

== History ==
One of the oldest actions in the royal courts, replevin had its roots in the law of customary courts, and its formal origin can be attributed to Glanvil, Chief Justiciar of England during the reign of Henry II (1154–1189). Strictly speaking, replevin in its original form was a provisional remedy. Its provision was to procure for the plaintiff the return of chattels taken out of his possession until the right to their possession could be decided by a court of law. No doubt, it was designed to avoid quarrels likely to cause a breach of the peace pending a settlement of the dispute about the right to possession. In other words, the rule of law was beginning to replace that of local force of arms and personal conflict as the resolution of disputes over chattels. The action was in direct succession to the efforts made to regulate self-help, which were the origin of the law of tort. The form of legal recourse was in connection of distress (distractio). This was the practice of taking some chattel from the peasant or underling until some action was performed. In the medieval era the services for which distress could be levied were numerous, since the incidents of tenure were then very numerous. Distress was also leviable as damage feasant. When animals strayed and did damage to a neighbor, they could be retained until the damage was made good. Whether or not the distress was levied for rent or for livestock damage feasant, the owner of the animals could obtain their release by giving "gage and pledge" – a form of security that the damage would be made good. One peculiarity of distraint lay in the fact that the distrainor did not get any form of legal possession. The goods and chattels were considered to be in the custody of the law. As a result, there was no taking of possession by the distrainor that was unlawful, since no possession was technically inferred.

The action in replevin began to appear in the thirteenth century. It seems clear that originally the action of replevin lay simply where the question to be determined was that of wrongful distress. Excess and abuse of distress was punished.

Since the distrainor did not get possession he was not originally liable in trespass, and the spheres of the two forms of action remained distinct. During the fourteenth century, after some vacillation by judges, it was held that the plaintiff could elect which remedy he chose when the chattels had been distrained. It was also held that replevin could be used in place of the writ of trespass de bonis aspotatis (trespass by the asportation of goods). In reality, there is little evidence this substitution ever occurred with any frequency, if at all. The rule involved interference with the possession of a chattel by the rightful owner. In 1856, Mennie v. Blake summarized the law of replevin by stating, "... it seems clear that replevin is not maintainable unless in a case in which there has been first a taking out of the possession of the owner. This stands upon authority and the reason of the thing".

The mere claim by the distrainor that he had a right to the chattels distrained was a technicality that ended the action in replevin. It was then necessary to re-file using a new writ invented in the early fourteenth century, called the writ de proprietate probanda – a writ "concerning the proof of ownership".

During the seventeenth and eighteenth centuries the action of trover also arose, which largely replaced that of trespass in the matter of wrongful distress. Replevin and trover never completely coincided, because there was a limitation on replevin.

Until the Common Law Procedure Act 1854 came into effect in England and Wales, a defendant was able to exercise an option of paying damages instead of restoring the actual goods.

Section 65 of the Tribunals, Courts and Enforcement Act 2007 made provision for the common law rules governing replevin in England and Wales to be replaced, although this provision did not become effective until 6 April 2014.

== Use ==
Replevin actions are common and fall into two types of action: if immediate possession of the property is sought and if the party filing the action is content to wait for an adjudication of final rights. In a case in which immediate possession of property is sought, the petitioning creditor is often required to post a bond to protect the defendant against wrongful detention. That approach can be a very powerful weapon in a case of someone holding property wrongly because it deprives the holder of the use of the property while the case is awaiting trial, thereby putting pressure on the holder to settle the matter quickly.

This replevin process falls into two stages:

1. the replevy, the steps that the owner takes to secure the physical possession of the goods, by giving security for prosecuting the action and for the return of the goods if the case goes against him and
2. the action (suit) of replevin itself (at common law, the ordinary action for the recovery of goods wrongfully taken would be one of detinue; but no means of immediate recovery liable to be seized).

Replevin is used when the party having the right of property cannot simply invoke self-help and take the property back. If the party has the ability to do so directly, the action is referred to as repossession. For example, in the states of Wisconsin and Louisiana, if a person who finances an automobile, becomes a registered owner of that vehicle and fails to make payments as agreed, the lienholder cannot simply repossess the vehicle. The lienholder must go to court and obtain an order of replevin.

In many cases, parties initiating a replevin action will elect not to gain immediate possession of the collateral or other wrongfully-held property and will instead file the replevin action without posting a bond. Once service of process is achieved, the defendant will likely be required to attend a court hearing on a specific date, then the parties' rights to possession will be adjudicated. A plaintiff creditor can typically prevail in the case by offering testimony and business records showing the borrower/defendant's obligation to pay, and default in payment. The Court will thereafter issue a judgment and authorize issuance of a writ of replevin, which is served by a sheriff's deputy, working in conjunction with persons hired or employed by the creditor to take the collateral or other property into its possession. The sheriff's role is to keep the peace and allow the creditor to get its property, without threat from the borrower. Once the creditor takes the property into its possession, it can sell the collateral, and apply the proceeds to the debt owed by the borrower.

In other cases, replevy is used to prevent damages that may occur from the continued use of an item, such as a public utility meter. In the case of non-payment of a public utility, a meter is typically left on the premise to allow reconnection should the balance due be paid, or if the person owing the bill sells the premise to another person who does not owe arrears to the utility, however, it is possible for one to reconnect the device and continue obtaining the commodity in question. In such cases, the utility could seek replevin for the utility meter itself, thereby preventing this practice.

== Law of replevin in other jurisdictions ==
In the 1899 case of McGregor v. McGregor, Irving J of the British Columbia Supreme Court wrote:

An action of replevin may be brought

1. where goods have been wrongfully distrained or
2. where goods have been otherwise, i.e. otherwise than by distress, wrongfully taken or detained.

The word 'wrongfully' is applicable to both cases. 'Wrongfully ... imports the infringement of some right, and any invasion of the civil rights of another is in itself a legal wrong, and the appropriate action for the violation of the legal right unconnected with contract is an action for tort. The early history of replevin action in England is traced (as) ... "The nature of the complaint in the action was for a tortious taking of the goods." Our British Columbia replevin action, which is wider than the English, gives the right to replevy to the party who could maintain trespass or trover. It is given, as it were, supplementary to, or in aid of, the remedy which those actions afford; but as all three actions, trespass, trover and replevin are classed ... as actions of tort, I think the action under our British Columbia statute is for the tortious taking or tortious detention of goods.

Provisions analogous to replevin in the case of distraint are found in the Civil Code of Quebec (known as movable hypothec without delivery, at Art. 2696 CCQ et seq.) and St Lucia (arts. 1888 et seq.), which was reproduced in substance from French law, which is also in force in Mauritius. There are analogous provisions in the Spanish Civil Code (art. 1922).

Similar provisions are also found in:

- New South Wales;
- Newfoundland;
- Ontario (not available without court order, except with respect to distraint for commercial property rent, where a commercial tenant is to be given five days for tender of rent and expenses after distress);
- Jamaica (Law 17 of 1900, certification of landlords bailiffs); and
- Queensland.

== See also ==
- Conversion (law)
- Detinue
- Lien
- Rei vindicatio
- Repossession
- Trespass to chattels
- Trover
