= Conversion (law) =

Property tort

Conversion is an intentional tort consisting of "taking with the intent of exercising over the chattel an ownership inconsistent with the real owner's right of possession". In England and Wales, it is a tort of strict liability. Its equivalents in criminal law include larceny or theft and criminal conversion. In those jurisdictions that recognise it, criminal conversion is a lesser crime than theft/larceny.

Many questions concerning joint ownership in enterprises such as a partnership belong in equity, and do not rise to the level of a conversion. Traditionally, a conversion occurs when some chattel is lost, then found by another who appropriates it to his own use without legal authority to do so. It has also applied in cases where chattels were bailed for safekeeping, then misused or misappropriated by the bailee or a third party.

Conversion, as a purely civil wrong, is distinguishable from both theft and unjust enrichment. Theft is obviously an act inconsistent with another's rights, and theft will also be conversion. But not all conversions are thefts because conversion requires no element of dishonesty. Conversion is also different from unjust enrichment. If one claims an unjust enrichment, the person who has another's property may always raise a change of position defense, to say they have unwittingly used up the assets they were transferred. For conversion, there always must be an element of voluntarily dealing with another's property, inconsistently with their rights.

== Elements of conversion ==
The elements of conversion are:

1. intent to convert the tangible or intangible property of another to one's own possession and use,
2. the property in question is subsequently converted.

In another formulation, it has been stated that one claiming conversion must show a tortious conversion of the chattel, a right to property in it, and a right to immediate possession which is absolute, unconditional, and not dependent upon the performance of some act.

A common act of conversion in medieval times involved bolts of cloth which were bailed for safekeeping, which the bailee or a third party took and made clothes for their own use or for sale. Other examples of conversion include cutting down trees on someone else's land and removing them without permission or privilege to do so; or taking furniture belonging to someone else, without their consent, and putting it into storage. The use of a patient's body parts after they had been removed in surgery to treat his leukemia raised questions about conversion which were addressed in the case of Moore v. Regents of the University of California, a 1990 landmark Supreme Court of California legal decision.

== History of conversion ==
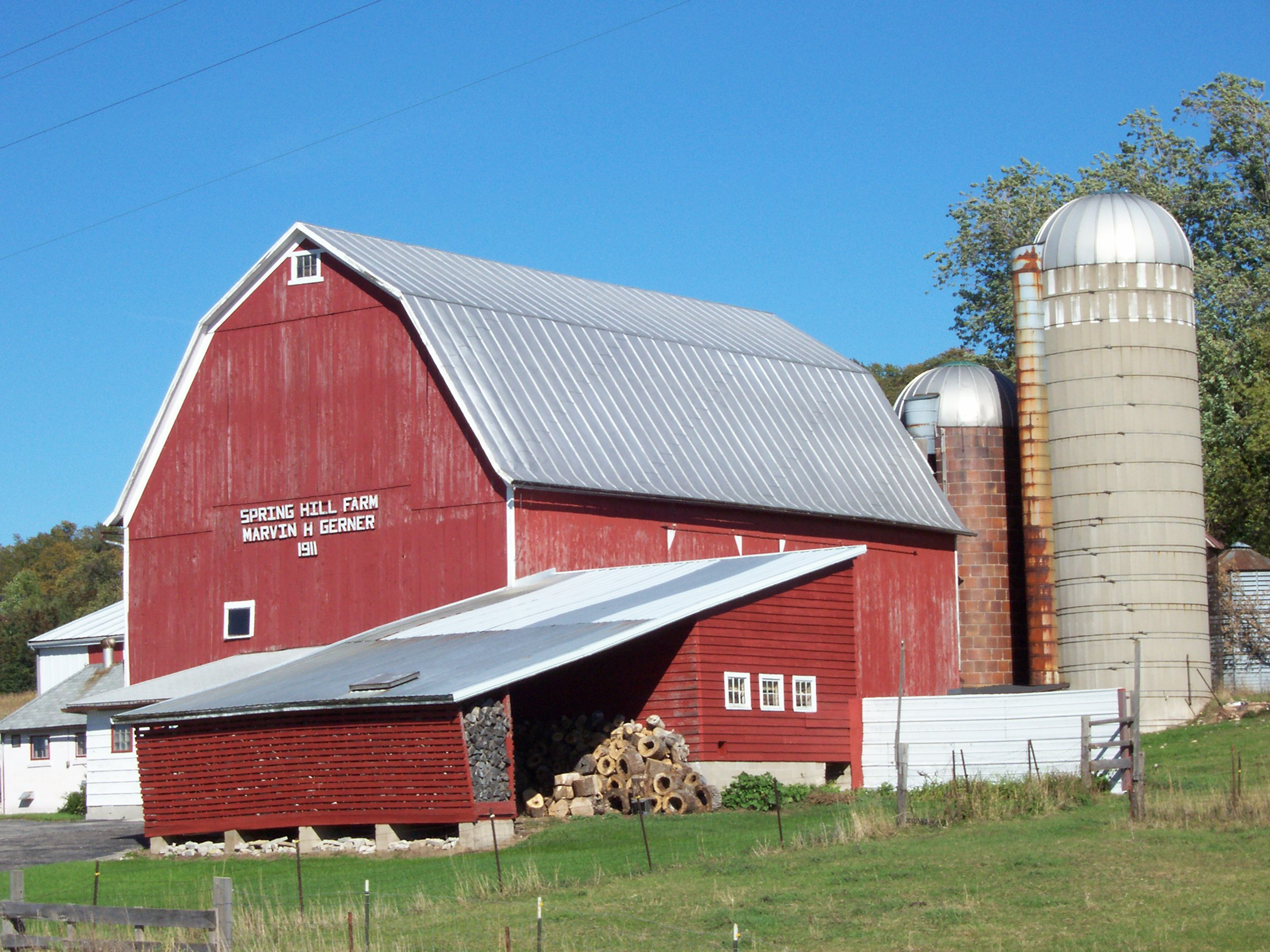
Buildings, silos and machinery attached to them can be converted if they are removed from the land.

Conversion has been described as a fascinating tort, albeit one which has largely eluded the attention of legal writers. The literature frequently laps over into that of trover. Other sources define conversion as a distinct act of dominion wrongfully exerted over another's personal property in denial of or inconsistent with his title or rights therein, or in derogation, exclusion, or defiance of such title or rights, without the owner's consent and without lawful justification.

A conversion occurs when a person does such acts in reference to the personal property of another as amount, in view of the law, to his appropriating the property for himself. The action probably developed because there was no equivalent form of action in English law to the Roman law rei vindicatio. This was an action in protection of one's property, whereby a claimant could simply allege in court "that's mine!". Early cases of conversion are to be found in 1479, where reference to an even earlier action on the case is made when the defendant "converted" the goods by changing their character, making clothes out of gold cloth.

Otherwise, conversion had its origin in the common law action in trover, as a branch of action on the case. The earliest cases are most likely lost. These probably involved cases when the finder of lost goods did not return them to the rightful owner, but used them himself or disposed of them to someone else. It became necessary to invent a new writ which covered the gap between action in trespass which lay for the wrongful taking of a chattel, and detinue which lay for its wrongful detention.

The claim in conversion had become standardized by 1554 in the case of Lord Mounteagle v Countess of Worcester (1554) 2 Dyer 121a, 73 ER 265. The plaintiff was in possession of certain goods, he casually lost them, the defendant found the goods and did not return them, but instead "converted them to his own use."

There is a distinction between trover and conversion. Trover resolved the old procedural problem of wager of law which had developed as a form of licensed perjury, which made detinue unattractive to an honest plaintiff suing a dishonest defendant. Wager at law allowed testimony from many witnesses, who might have nothing to do with the actual litigation. In this sense, it was not much different from champerty and maintenance. Because trover sidestepped these old problems, there was an effort to expand it into many different forms. The legal device to accomplish this at first was to treat the allegation of losing the goods and then finding them as a fiction. This method was seen in several cases in the 17th century. As a technical factor, the defendant was not permitted to deny losing and finding, so the only issues to be litigated were those of the plaintiff's right to possession and the conversion as an existent fact. With losing and finding no longer essential, trover became the standard remedy for any form of interference with a chattel. It entirely replaced detinue, which fell into complete disuse. It replaced trespass to chattels to such an extent that the former was rarely seen. In 1756, Lord Mansfield stated in Cooper v Chitty (1756) 1 Burr 20, 31; 97 ER 166, 172:

[W]henever trespass for taking goods will lie, that is, where they are taken wrongfully, trover will lie.

Similar results are seen in other cases from the time. The two actions were regarded as alternative remedies for the same wrong. Often, the plaintiff had a choice of action, although there were differences between the choices. Trover must involve a wrongful detention of goods which had not been wrongfully taken, while trespass would not. The theory of trespass was that the plaintiff remained the owner of the chattel, with his possession only interrupted or interfered with, so that when it was tendered back to the plaintiff, he must accept it. The damages must be limited to the loss of use, which could be considerably less than its total value. Trover, which involved lost goods or those placed in a bailment, necessitated full replacement damages. Once the damages were paid, the ownership of the chattel passed to the defendant in trover.

The modern law of conversion crystallised after the case of Fouldes v Willoughby (1841) 8 M & W 540, 151 ER 1153. Two horses owned by the plaintiff were placed on a river ferry. The horses were put back on the shore by the defendant ferryman. The plaintiff/owner of the horses remained on the ferry and subsequently lost the horses. It was held that this was a trespass, but not a conversion, since there was no interference with the plaintiff's "general right of domination" over the horses.

== Property subject to conversion ==
In order for a conversion to occur, it used to need to be lost then found by some other person than the owner. In the process, it was possible that the property could be converted. Chattels converted have included a dog, money and tax receipts. Land could not be the subject of an action in trover, since it could not be lost, then found and converted. The same was true for sand and gravel, timber, crops and fixtures, so long as they were considered as a part of the land. No action in trover could be had. Once there was severance from the land, these became personal property, and trover could be entertained because of removal from the land.

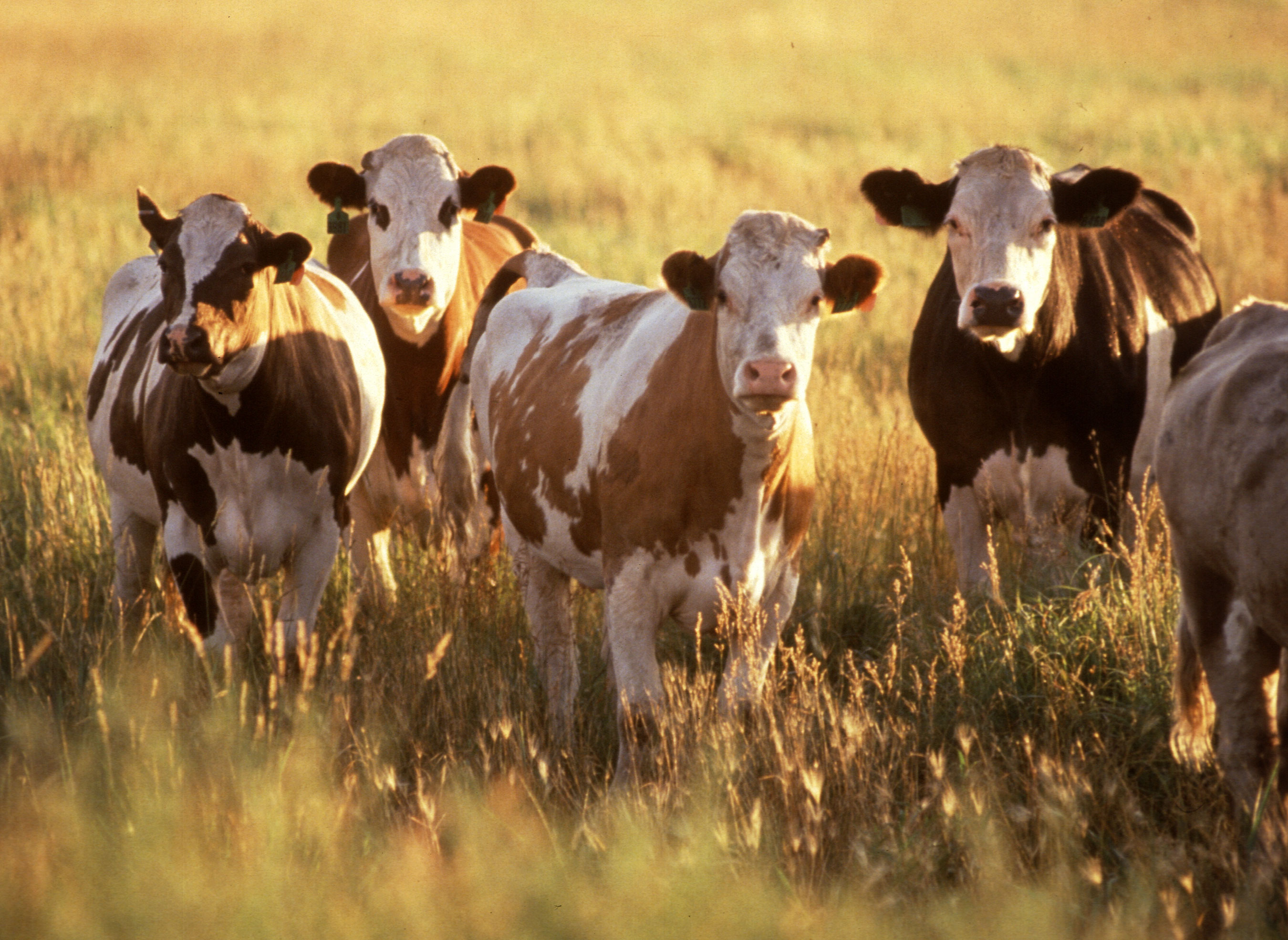
Animals can be converted if they are removed, co-mingled, or injured.

=== Intangible right ===
Intangible rights could not be lost or found, and the original common law rule was that there could not be a conversion of such. This restriction has been discarded for the most part. In the absence of contravening evidence, the measure of damages for conversion of a negotiable instrument usually is taken to be its face value.

=== Tangible and intangible property ===
The conception that an action for conversion lies only for tangible property capable of being identified and taken into actual possession is based on a fiction by which the action of trover was founded, namely, that the defendant had found the property of another, which was lost. This conception has become, in the progress of the law, something without meaning which has been discarded by most courts. Therefore, it has been generally accepted that an action for conversion lies for every species of personal property which is the subject of private ownership, whether animate or inanimate. Intangible property can be the subject of a conversion in the United States. There cannot be an action in conversion for choses in action or mere debt. Computer software can be the subject of a conversion.

Both tangible items and intangible property can be the subject of a claim for conversion under United States law. In Kremen v. Cohen, 325 F.3d 1035 (9th Cir. 2003), when the domain name sex.com was wrongfully transferred to a con man, a claim for conversion was held to be available against the domain name registrar. In English law, however, the recent case of OBG Ltd. v. Allan [2007] UKHL 21 held intangible property cannot be the subject of a claim for conversion.

=== Written instruments ===
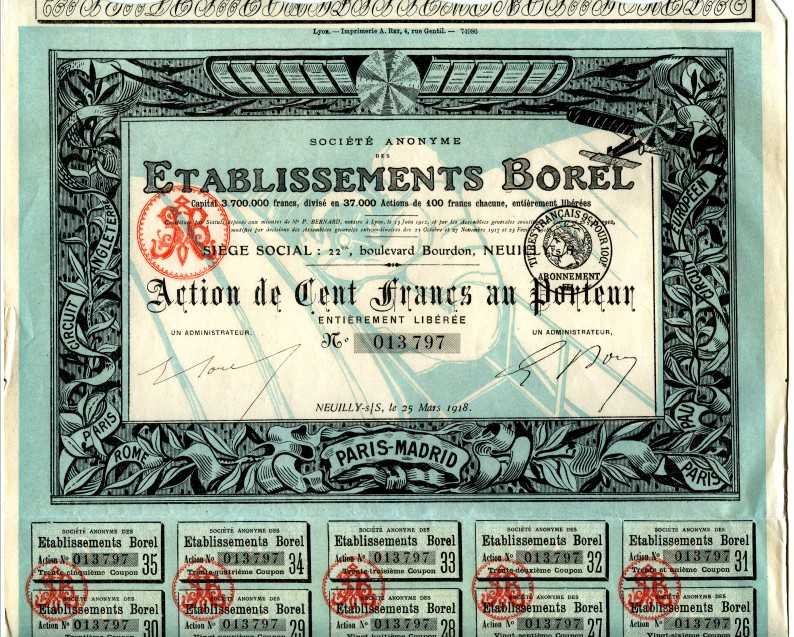
Stock certificates, bonds and commercial paper can be the subject of an action in conversion

A judgment that is in the nature of a debt of record, but has neither goods nor a chattel attached is not subject to a conversion, because the judgment creditor has no property in it. A writ of execution can be the subject of a conversion, despite the fact that it is not private property. Unpublished and published manuscripts, whether copyrighted or not can be the subject of a conversion, as can paintings, pictures, photos, letters, business books, pamphlets, newspapers and the like. Insurance policies, stock certificates, bills of lading, securities, bonds and commercial paper can be converted.

=== Real estate and property affixed thereto ===
The general rule is that an action for conversion lies only with respect to personal property, and cannot apply to real estate.

==== "Movables" ====
The distinction between "movables" (not associated in any way with real estate as such nor necessary to its enjoyment) and "immovables" (such as buildings and often including spare parts or even potentially but not usually mobile tools or devices or systems) arises from the principle of lex situs, by which the governing law for immovables is that where the land is located, regardless of where a will is probated or contract made or executed. There are distinctions made between monetary claim on land and land itself, often with different limitations. However, these distinctions determine jurisdiction, rather than define how to resolve the conversion or possession issue.

The fact that personal property is annexed to realty after its conversion usually does not prevent the maintenance of an action for the conversion, although opinion on this subject remains mixed (in part due to conflits of laws between movables and immovables on the same lot). Actions for conversion of a building, machinery attached to a building or a grain elevator have been allowed. Severance of property from real estate can be converted. Buildings can be converted. Manure can be converted. There is no simple general rule dividing personal vs. real property.

Land itself cannot be converted or "stolen" by possession. Rather, common law recognizes and rewards adverse possession as a form of undocumented ownership of neglected land (which becomes documented when it is challenged or registered by deed or survey or otherwise), suits for trespass or ejection from land against which deeded rights are grounds or defense.

== Acts constituting conversion ==
An action for conversion does not rest on knowledge or intent of the defendant. The act constituting "conversion" must be an intentional act, but does not require wrongful intent, and is not excused by care, good faith, or lack of knowledge. Fraudulent intent is not an element of conversion. The defendant is answerable for the conversion, no matter how good his intentions were, or how careful he has been, or how apparently well-founded was his belief that his tortious act was right. The existence of probable cause does not preclude liability. A person may be liable for conversion even though he was reasonably mistaken in thinking the facts to be such as would give him a legal right to the goods.

There are cases in which the defendant does not clearly appropriate the property to his own use, and in which the question whether there is a conversion therefore depends on the intent of the defendant either express or implied.

=== In general ===
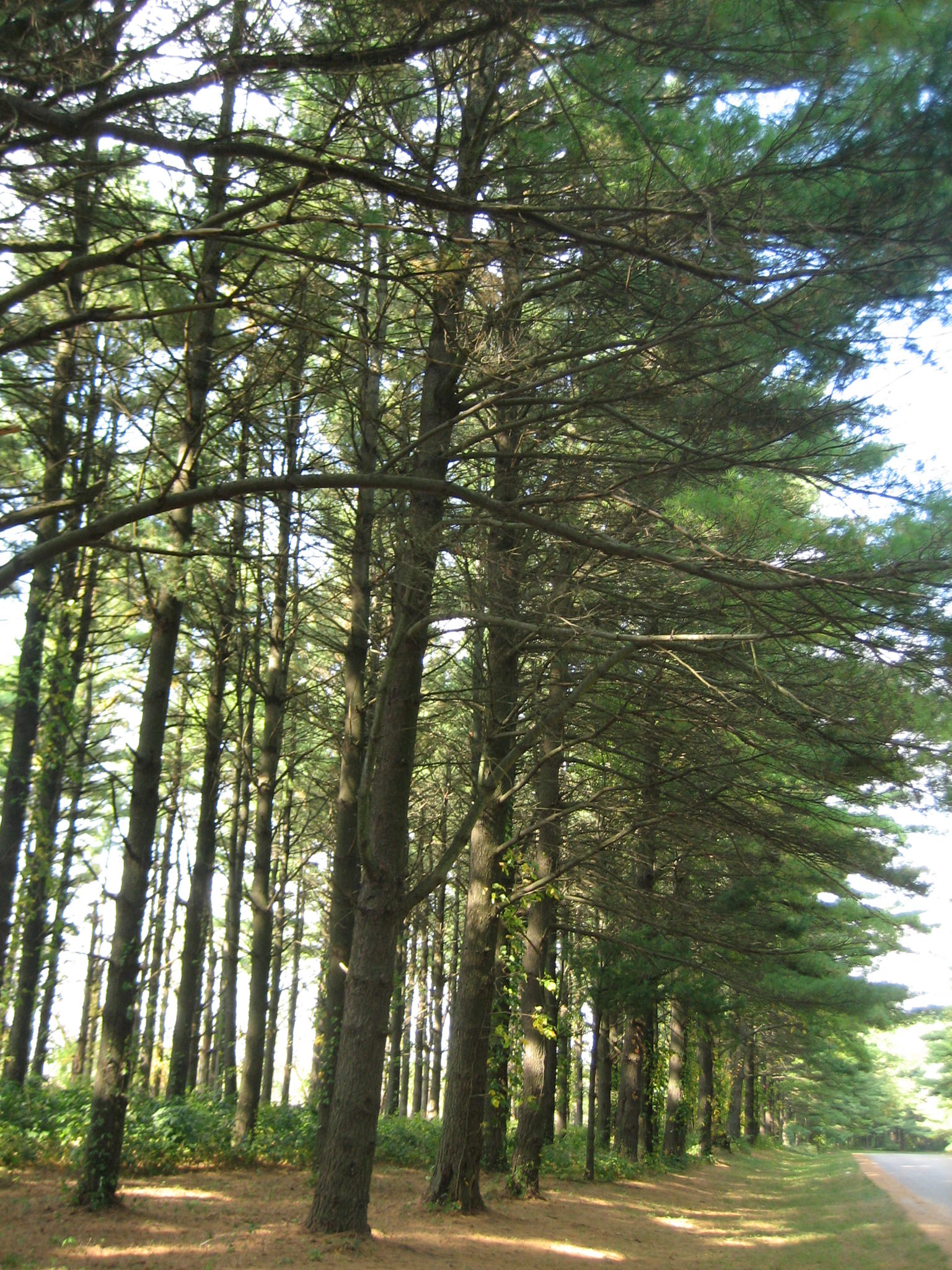
Trees cannot be converted, but lumber, severed from the land, can be.

Conversion, being a wrongful act, cannot spring from the exercise of a legal right. Such acts include the right of execution on a legal judgment or contesting rights under a contract. The general rule is that there is no conversion until some act is done which is a denial or violation of the plaintiff's dominion over or rights in the property. To constitute a conversion of a chattel, there must be an unauthorized assumption of the right to possession or ownership. The act must have the essence of a tort.

=== Depriving owner of possession ===
The exercise of ownership over property may take a number of forms. All that is required is that the defendant exercise control over the chattel in a manner inconsistent with the plaintiff's right of possession. The gist of a conversion is not the acquisition of the property by the wrongdoer, but the wrongful deprivation of another's property which the owner is entitled to possess.

=== Receipt of property ===
A person who accepts the possession of personal property from one not authorized to transfer it may be regarded as a converter. The Restatement (Second) of Torts, an influential treatise on United States law, is in accord with this concept, stating that one who receives possession of a chattel from another with the intent to acquire for himself or a third person a proprietary interest in the chattel which the other has not the power to transfer is subject to liability for conversion to a third person then entitled to the immediate possession of the chattel.

=== Disposal of property ===
An action for conversion may be predicated upon an improper disposal, removal, transportation, delivery, or transfer of possession of property to one not authorized by the owner to receive the property. The Restatement (Second) of Torts states that, with some exceptions, one who makes an unauthorized delivery of a chattel to a person not entitled to its immediate possession is subject to liability for conversion to another who is so entitled. A bailee, agent, or servant who re-delivers to his bailor, principal, or master is not liable for conversion unless the person entitled to immediate possession had made an adverse claim upon him. A bailee, agent or servant who delivers the chattel to a third person pursuant to the instructions of his bailor, principal or master is not liable for conversion unless he has knowledge or reason to know that his bailor, principal, or master is not authorized so to dispose of it.

=== Detention or refusal to surrender possession ===
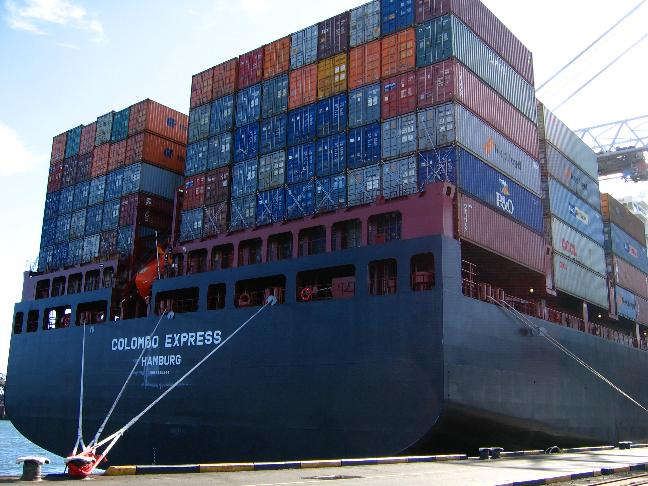
A sea container and its contents, lost, found and not returned to its rightful owner can be both a conversion and a crime.

A common conversion is a refusal to surrender possession of the chattel to one who is entitled to it. Normally, this is judged to be a sufficiently serious interference with the plaintiff's right of control. If the detention is small or not deemed to be serious, it will not be considered a conversion. A garage which delays delivery of an automobile for 30 minutes does not commit a conversion. The same is true of a stock certificate. Placing furniture or other goods in storage to prevent damage or theft is also not a conversion per se, if proper notice of its location is given to the owner. If the delay is long, or intentional, it is a conversion. Holding an automobile for a month is a conversion. Goods placed in storage or in bailment destroyed by fire are considered to have been converted. In 1704, it was stated in Baldwin v Cole:

The very denial of goods to him that has a right to demand them is an actual conversion, and not only evidence of it.

=== Wrongful use, loss or injury ===
The use of or intermeddling (a term usually applicable to estate law) with the property of another has often been held to constitute a conversion, whether the act is done by one who had no authority to use the property, or by one who has authority to use the property but uses it in an unauthorized way. Any unjustified exercise of dominion over property by one who is not the owner nor entitled to possession which interferes with the right of possession of another who is lawfully entitled thereto constitutes a conversion. According to the Restatement (Second) of Torts, one who uses a chattel in a manner which is a serious violation of the right of another to control its use is subject to liability to the other for conversion. A conversion may be predicated upon destruction of personal property. An action for conversion may lie for killing an animal or rendering a musical instrument useless.

== Persons entitled to bring action ==
An agent entrusted by a principal with the possession of goods is generally recognized as having a sufficient interest in the goods to enable him to maintain an action against a third person for a conversion. Some jurisdictions hold that the agent must have more than a mere right of possession. A similar result has been reached where the servant left the property in the possession of the defendant, who subsequently converted it. Where a sheriff attached chattels and delivered them for safekeeping to a person, the person was merely the sheriff's servant, and having no interest in the chattels, could not maintain an action for their conversion. Causes of action for conversion are generally assignable, so that the action may be instituted by the assignee. An officer in possession of property may ignore a conversion of the same by a wrongdoer and proceed to sell the property on execution, the purchaser then being permitted to sue the wrongdoer for the conversion of the property. A transferee of personal property, or interest therein, who acquires the right of possession by or through the transfer, may maintain an action for a conversion committed after the transfer, though he has not yet received actual possession of the goods. A creditor, having no interest, generally may not be a plaintiff in an action to retrieve a debtor's converted property. An owner of land may bring an action in conversion, but he must be in material possession of the land and of the property severed from the land at the time of the conversion.

== Persons subject to action ==
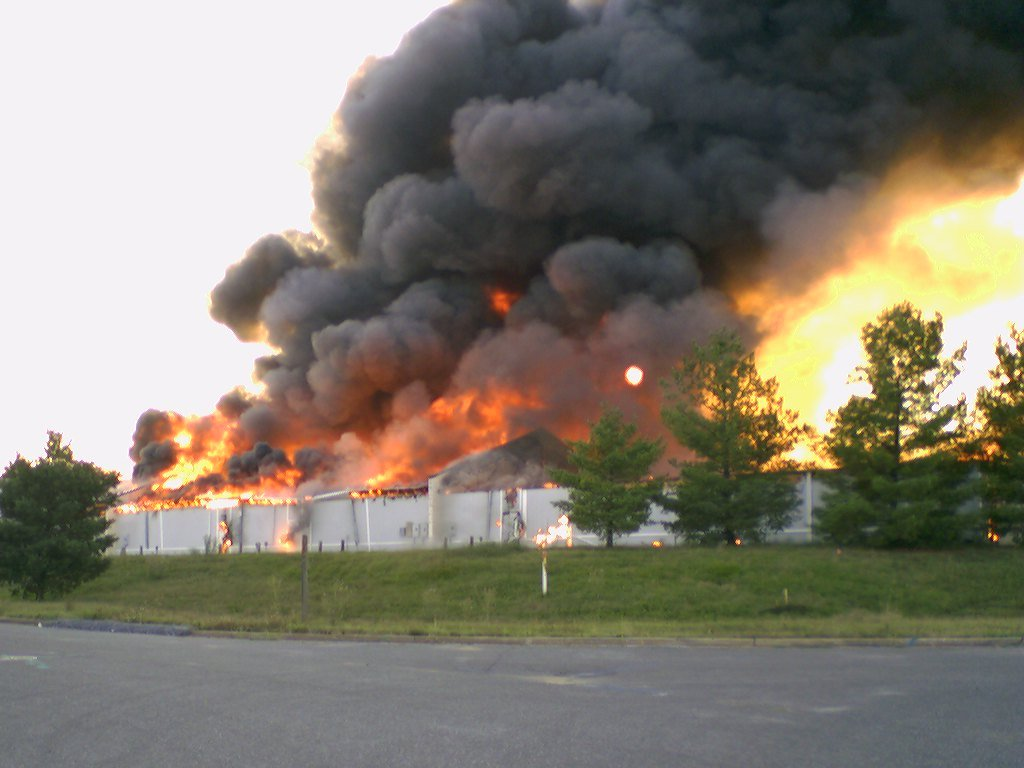
Furniture and clothing placed into storage without a notice to the owner, and subsequently destroyed in a warehouse fire has been ruled to be a conversion.

The owner of a partial interest in property may be liable for converting the same, where he wrongfully takes it out of the possession of another, or does some other act amounting to a conversion. The following are the typical defendants in an action in conversion:

- Fraudulent takers and their transferees
- Owner as possessor of land
- Persons aiding and/or abetting in conversion
- Public officers
- An agent, even if he acts in good faith and in accordance with his instructions, if the principal is guilty of conversion
- The principal when his agent's act of converting the property is committed within the scope of the agency
- The owner of the property if he diminishes its value or sells or destroys it to the damage of a lienholder

== Conditions precedent to recovery ==
In order to maintain an action for conversion, the plaintiff must have an interest in the thing converted. He must recover on the strength of his own title, without regard to the weakness of that of his adversary. It is necessary that the plaintiff be the owner of the property claimed to be converted, or that he be in possession or entitled to possession at the time of the alleged conversion. Absolute and unqualified title is sufficient, but it is not necessary. A mere right of possession is generally regarded as an interest sufficient to maintain an action.

=== Interest in property ===
An action for conversion may be maintained by persons having the immediate right of possession of the article converted. In order for a plaintiff to recover in a suit for conversion, it is necessary that the plaintiff establish a right to the property and what is converted. An immediate right to possession at the time of conversion is usually all that is required in the way of title or possession to enable the plaintiff to maintain an action. The possession of personal property carries with it the presumption of title, and enables the possessor to maintain an action for conversion against any person except the rightful owner. As against a stranger with no possession rights, mere possession alone is good enough, and in such a case, the plaintiff need prove no more than possession. Generally, a peaceable possession of land, even though wrongful, is a sufficient interest on which to base an action for conversion against a trespasser upon the land who severs property from the soil as part of the trespass, although neither party has title to the land or the property severed therefrom.

=== Tender of debt due defendant ===
Where a tender of a debt due the defendant is necessary to entitle the plaintiff to the immediate possession of the property, such tender is necessary to entitle him to maintain the action for conversion. This is because an action for conversion cannot be maintained unless the plaintiff, at the time of the alleged conversion, was entitled to the immediate possession of the specific property that is the subject of the conversion. A tender is not required where it is no longer within the power of the defendant to perform his part of the agreement out of which the debt arose.

=== Demand ===
Some jurisdictions require a demand and refusal to be necessary to constitute a conversion and to maintain a subsequent action for conversion. The usual rule is that demand and refusal are never necessary, except to furnish evidence of the conversion. Without these, when the circumstances (circumstantial evidence) are sufficient to prove the conversion, demand and refusal are superfluous. In those jurisdictions requiring a demand and refusal, there is no specific form the demand must take. In cases where stolen property ends up in the hands of a third party, demand may be necessary to put the third party on notice that the property has been stolen.

== Defenses ==
In a conversion suit, it is no defense to claim that the defendant was not negligent or that the defendant acquired the plaintiff's property through the plaintiff's unilateral mistake, or that the defendant acted in complete innocence and perfect good faith.

The following are traditional defenses to an action in conversion:

- Abandonment. Abandonment of the property before it was taken by the defendant is a complete defense.
- Authority of law. A conversion cannot occur if it is done by authority of law, a court order or valid process.
- Consent or approbation. Consent by the plaintiff can be either express or implied.
- Delay in bringing action. Statutes of limitations are defined by legislative jurisdiction. Some cases are based on "reasonable knowledge". Paintings purchased from a third person became the subject of an action in conversion, even though the incident had occurred 30 years prior. The action accrued based on when the plaintiff reasonably knew or should have known the identity of the possessor of the converted paintings. See also the doctrine of laches.
- Fraud of the plaintiff. Conveying property to a third person for purposes of evading creditors is a complete defense to a subsequent action in conversion.
- Interest of defendant. If the defendant has ownership or partial ownership to the property, it cannot be converted. Cases revolve around the specific facts concerning ownership.
- Value of property. A provisional defense can be made if the property converted has no value. Nevertheless, it is well established that it is not necessary for property to have a commercial value in order to maintain an action in conversion. This argument can be used to mitigate damages.
- Writings. A bill or debt obligation can be converted. However, if it has been paid or otherwise satisfied, then it has neither value nor existence in the eyes of the court.
- Nonexistence or lack of identity of property. Something that was not in existence at the time of the alleged conversion cannot be converted.
- Privilege. Finders of lost property may be entitled to use or ownership if the real owner cannot be identified. This is an overlap into the rules of trover.
- Unlawful and illegal acts. Unlawful contracts, illegal ownership and illegal activities on the part of the plaintiff can be a defense to an action in conversion. A counterfeit coin cannot be converted, nor can a note issued in an illegal manner.
- Waiver, ratification and estoppel. An action in conversion can be dismissed if the right to treat the action has been waived by the plaintiff.
- By receipt of proceeds of a sale. Accepting the proceeds of a sale of the converted property is a defense against further action.
- By accepting return of goods. Once the owner accepts the converted property back, he or she is generally precluded from any further action.

== Damages ==
=== In general ===
The remedy for conversion is usually in the form of damages equal to the fair market value of the chattel at the time of conversion. The converter can offer to return possession of the chattel to the complainant, but the complainant is not obligated to accept. If the complainant wants the chattel returned without any additional monetary damages, they can claim a related tort, detinue. One may use force in order to recover a chattel only if the wrongdoer is either in the process of taking the chattel or the owner of the chattel is in "hot pursuit" of the chattel. This is because a victim of conversion should use the legal remedies available as opposed to "self-help" or violence. Deadly force may never be used in the recovery of chattels.

The exact measure of compensation due to a plaintiff whose goods have been wrongfully converted may be merely nominal if the wrong is technical and the defendant can return the goods; it may be limited to the actual damage where the goods can be returned, but the wrong is substantial; but in ordinary cases it is the full value to the owner of the goods of which he has been deprived.

=== Special damages ===
When the conversion occurs, the injured party should receive full compensation for actual losses. Special damages may be recovered in an action for conversion for any injury proximately resulting from the conversion. The Restatement (Second) of Torts indicates these damages can consist of:

- the additional value of a chattel due to additions or improvements made by the converter not in good faith.
- the amount of any further pecuniary loss of which the deprivation has been a legal cause.
- interest from the time at which the value was fixed.
- compensation for the loss of use not otherwise compensated.

It is a generally recognized rule that interest lost from the conversion is recoverable. Loss of rental value can be considered as interest.

=== Mitigation ===
The defendant is allowed to show the existence of facts which would make it unjust to allow the plaintiff to recover full value. Ordinarily, the defendant is not allowed to deduct maintenance and upkeep expenses which would normally accrue taking care of the converted property. Return of the property with acceptance by the owner can dismiss the action, or be used as a mitigating fact. However, the mere offering of the converted property does not necessarily dismiss all damages which may have occurred based on the original tort. Action under legal process can be a complete defense and can mitigate damages.

=== Measure for converting particular kinds of property ===
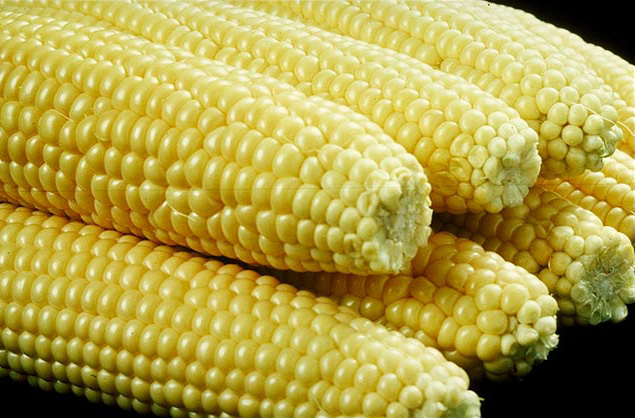
Damages for conversion of grains, corn and cotton are based on market value, plus any accrual or interest gained.

There are certain cases which require special calculation of damages.

- Commodities. Stock certificates or bonds which have increased in value after conversion. Recovery is permitted for the increased value. This rule can be applied to other kinds of property, such as cotton and corn.
- Business enterprise. The proper measure of damages for a business enterprise is the value at the time of the conversion.
- Commercial paper. Damages are generally the value at the time of conversion plus accrued interest.
- Insurance policies. Similar to other choses of action. Damage is based on value at the time of conversion, less the value of premiums to be paid after the conversion, and value based on life expectancy.
- Corporate stock. Damages based on market value, lost dividends and accrual or loss of value, considering lost chance to sell stock at a profit.
- Property severed from real estate. Damages measured based on market value and interest.
- Property of no market value or held for personal use. Items such as personal mementos, writings, personal diaries, plans, portraits, photographs, memoirs and the like, which have no intrinsic market value pose a difficulty. Usually the court will try to develop a method to arrive at a reasonable value for such an item. Results vary based on the facts of the case.

== Practice and procedure in the United States ==
=== In general ===
The first question in an action for conversion is that of venue and jurisdiction. Mere questions of ownership within partnerships and some contract law do not arise to the level required for an action in conversion. These are matters best settled in a suit in equity with a determination of equity on the case. A true conversion is strictly a legal case. In general, relief through an action in conversion can proceed, even if other potential remedies have not been exhausted. However, once the action in conversion is commenced, the plaintiff may be precluded from seeking concurrent remedies. Other concurrent remedies typically are:

- Action to recover possession which may include trover, detinue and replevin, which are now statutorily defined and vary between jurisdictions.
- Assumpsit
- Criminal proceedings

Joinder of parties can usually be allowed. Successive converters need not be named in an action in conversion.

=== Pleading by plaintiff ===
The facts sufficient to constitute a cause of action for conversion must be set forth in the complaint or declaration, so as to show that the plaintiff has a right to maintain an action. The typical pleading should include:

- Jurisdictional facts.
- Identification of the defendant.
- Diversity of citizenship and amount in controversy (required for entry into federal court).
- Proof of title or right of possession of the property.
- Description of the property.
- Value of the property.
- Facts constituting the alleged conversion by the defendant.
- Demand and refusal for a return of the property from the defendant.
- Damages sustained by the plaintiff.

=== Answer of defendant ===
In general, the defendant should answer the charge of conversion by asserting:

- Matters intending to prove the establishment of the defendant's affirmative defenses.
- Plaintiff's consent to the defendant's taking (if it exists, can be proved or inferred by circumstantial evidence).
- Defendant's rights to the property are superior to those of the plaintiff.
- Plaintiff had waived the right to the property or to a subsequent cause of action.
- Plaintiff was estopped from asserting any right to the property as against the defendant.
- The property was abandoned.
- Alleging mistake, or other mitigating circumstance - assertion that the plaintiff has not tried to facilitate defendant's attempts to resolve the issue or mitigate damages.

=== Evidence ===
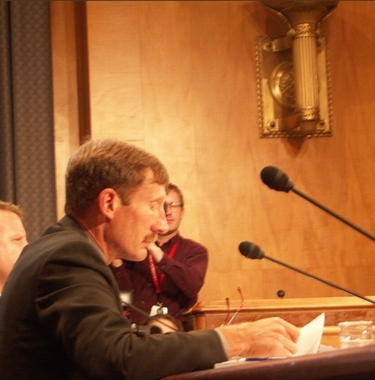
In an action for conversion, as with all tort cases, witness testimony is important to establish the facts.

Rules of evidence are no different in an action for conversion than any other tort case. The burden is on the plaintiff to establish the case. The following areas are generally necessary to be established:

- Plaintiff's interest in the property.
- Identity of the property.
- Value of the property.
- Identification of the defendant.
- The defendant exercised dominion over the property.
- The defendant's exercise of dominion was intentionally committed.

These are established through testimony and documentary evidence.

=== Verdict and judgment ===
An action in conversion is for the monetary value of the property and not the property itself. A judgment which requires either monetary damages or return of the property is not, per se, erroneous. A verdict demanding only the return of property is reversible error. It is within the discretion of the trier of fact to determine actual value, which may be different from that of market value, testimony or documentary evidence. A judgment is for the title and ownership of the property at the time of the conversion, and does not necessarily effect subsequent transactions which may have occurred.

== Conversion and crime ==
Conversion is an interference with another's ownership of property. It is a general intent tort, not a specific intent tort. That means that the intent to take or otherwise deal with the property is enough to support the claim, and it doesn't matter whether the defendant knew that the act would constitute interference with the property of another. Therefore, the defendant's innocent reasons for the act cannot be used as an excuse. It does not matter if the defendant made a mistake. The standard remedy for conversion is a judgment for damages in an amount equal to the fair market value of the property. Punitive damages are also possible, because conversion is an intentional tort.

The standard remedy in a detinue action is an order that the property be returned. The standard remedy in an action for trespass to chattels is a judgment for an amount equal to the value of loss of use of the property. Damages from a trespass claim are based on the harm caused to the plaintiff, rather than the value of the chattel. Many actions can constitute both conversion and trespass. In these cases, a plaintiff must eventually choose which claim to press based on what damages they seek to recover. It is the difference between forcing a rental fee and a total sale upon a defendant.

In some cases the exercise of the dominion may amount to an act of trespass or to a crime, e.g. where the taking amounts to larceny, or fraudulent appropriation by a bailee or agent entrusted with the property of another (Larceny Acts of 1861 and 1901). Fraudulent conversion by any person to his own use (or that of persons other than the owner) of property entrusted to him is a crime in the case of custodians of property, factors, trustees under express trusts in writing (Larceny Act 1861, ss. 77-85; Larceny Act 1901).

== See also ==
- Detinue
- Haslem v. Lockwood
- Lien
- Rei vindicatio
- Replevin
- Trover

== Bibliography ==
- Bullen, E.; Leake, S.M. (1905). Bullen and Leake's Precedents of Pleadings in Actions in the King's Bench Division of the High Court of Justice (8 ed.). Dodd and Chitty.
- Clerk, J.F.; Lindsell, W.C. (1904). Clerk and Lindsell on Torts (3 ed.). Sweet & Maxwell.
- Dart, J.H. (1871). A Treatise on the Law and Practice Relating to Vendors and Purchasers of Real Estate. Cornell University Library. ISBN 978-1-112-59867-8.
- Jarman, Thomas (1893). A Treatise on Wills (5 ed.).
- Lewin, Thomas (1904). A Practical Treatise on the Law of Trusts (2 ed.).
- Pollock, F. (1904). The Law of Torts: A Treatise on the Principles of Obligations Arising from Civil Wrongs in the Common Law; to Which is Added the Draft of a Code of Civil Wrongs Prepared for the Government of India (7 ed.). London: Stevens and Sons.
- Prosser, W.; Keeton, P.; et al. (1984). Prosser and Keeton on Torts (5 ed.). St. Paul, Minnesota: West Publishing Co. ISBN 978-0-314-74880-5.
