= Non-fatal offences against the person in English law =

Class of offence in English law

Non-fatal offences against the person, under English law, are generally taken to mean offences which take the form of an attack directed at another person, that do not result in the death of any person. Such offences where death occurs are considered homicide, whilst sexual offences are generally considered separately, since they differ substantially from other offences against the person in theoretical basis and composition. Non-fatal offences against the person mainly derive from the Offences against the Person Act 1861, although no definition of assault or battery is given there.

Offences against the person include minor forms of battery (any unlawful touching of another person); its complementary offence, assault (causing the apprehension of a battery, even when one has not yet occurred); and various more serious offences which are based on assault and battery (together called "common assault"). This includes assault occasioning actual bodily harm, where the victim suffers injuries such as bruising or skin abrasions (the converse being an injury that is "transient and trifling"); wounding (a piercing of all layers of the skin); and causing grievous bodily harm (injuries more serious than in actual bodily harm, for example broken bones). The latter two offences may be committed "with intent", meaning there is an additional mens rea component that makes the defendant more culpable for their actions. Whilst recklessness is sufficient for most offences against the person – that the defendant foresaw the risk of the proscribed injury occurring without necessarily intending it to happen – this is insufficient for crimes of intent.

== General characteristics ==
Number of recorded crimes (2009–10). Categories approximate non-fatal offences against the person.

Common to all crimes against the person is the infringement of the right to bodily integrity. It extends to the touching of clothing, for example, and where no physical harm actually results. However, if all touchings were criminalised, this would interfere with the right to liberty. It is the very touching, and not the harm, that is the violation of principle. This is related to the right to privacy under Article 8 of the European Convention on Human Rights. The central statute on this topic is Offences against the Person Act 1861, which brought together a multitude of difference offences, with much overlap and inconsistent terminology. These include both the actual infliction and the threat of violence. Although criticised, the Act has not been replaced.

In the context of the law of attempts, the Crown Prosecution Service advises that "where the evidence demonstrates that the suspect intended to cause an injury that is substantially more serious than that (if any) which was in fact caused, prosecutors should consider the circumstances of the case as a whole as well as the relevant sentencing guideline to determine the appropriate charge."

== Assault and battery ==
A distinction is drawn between the offence of assault and that of battery. Assault is the apprehension of the possibility of immediate unlawful violence, and battery that of the infliction of such violence. Several proposals, including one from the Criminal Law Revision Committee in 1980 have proposed merging the offences. However, the distinction was confirmed in DPP v Little (Note: [1992] QB 645 (DC)) in 1992. There, the conflation of assault and battery was criticised as duplicitous. If D throws a punch at V, who dodges, this is likely to be an assault but not a battery; if V is attacked from behind, this may constitute a battery without an assault. Actions which constitute ordinary daily life are not considered assault or battery, for example, jostling on a crowded train. The term "common assault" is used to refer to either a technical assault or a battery.

=== Assault ===
Assault is a summary offence in England and Wales, with the case heard only at a magistrates' court. Although R v Little considered assault a statutory offence, none of the statutes referred to contain any definition of assault. The actus reus, endorsed in R v Ireland, (Note: [1998] AC 147) is any act by D that causes V to apprehend immediate and unlawful personal violence. The term "force" rather than "violence" is used by the Crown Prosecution Service (CPS). As a definition, this has proven stable, but its interpretation has varied. The force must be unlawful – outside the realm of defensive or preventative force, for example. Consent of the victim may be enough to prevent the commission of a crime. There is to debate as to whether lack of consent is an element of the actus reus, making it inherent to the commission of a crime, or whether consent is a defence. Andrew Simester and Bob Sullivan argue that the former is more correct, since lack on consent is vital to the crime; since the act may not constitute a harm even if enacted. The disregard for the victim's autonomy and privacy is the actionable part of the offence. The victim need not be frightened by the apprehension of violence, merely not want the person concerned to do it.

Assault requires a positive act, not an omission. Mere lawful presence in a location is not enough to satisfy the conduct requirement; illegal trespass, however, is sufficient. John Cyril Smith has suggested that wilfully refusing to retract an inadvertent act that causes the victim to apprehend violence may constitute an assault by omission. It is arguable that there was once a rule that "mere words" could not constitute an assault, but the case of R v Ireland confirmed that even silent phone calls would be grounds for the charge of assault. R. v Constanza added threatening letters to this category.

Although assault involves a threat of an immediate battery, the perpetrator need not actually intend to carry out that battery. It is enough that he, intentionally or recklessly, caused the victim to apprehend such an occurrence. The term "immediate" has also been used in different ways. Following Ireland, it seems likely that even where the victim knew the defendant was some distance away, this may be sufficient. As Lord Steyn said there, "what, if not the possibility of imminent personal violence, was the victim terrified about?". This would widen the crime of assault considerably. It is perfectly conceivable that the victim was fearful, but did not believe an attack was imminent. That she actually apprehended "immediate violence", rather than merely "immediately apprehended", is doubtful. In Constanza, it was sufficient for the prosecution to show that the victim feared an attack in the future, which may have been imminent. It also suggested that the anticipated harm could be psychological rather than physical.

Blake v Barnard (Note: (1840) 9 C & P 626; 173 ER 985) established a rule that conditional threats could not amount to an assault. However, the court's reliance on Tuberville v Savage (Note: (1669) 1 Mod Rep 3; 86 ER 684) was tenuous at best. Such threats would normally be considered assault.

The mens rea requirement is that the defendant must have intend to, or recklessly, cause the victim to fear the possibility of immediate unlawful violence. There is no authority that suggests that "intend" or "recklessly" ought to mean something from their normal meanings. Cunningham recklessness – that the defendant himself foresaw the risk of harm – is applied. Assault is a crime of "basic intent" for the purposes of the Majewski test concerning voluntary intoxication.

=== Battery ===
The defendant commits a battery if they intentionally or recklessly apply unlawful force to another, without their consent. It is subject to the same "everyday life" exception common to assault. Cases have included kissing, (Note: Dungey (1864) 4 F&F 99, 102; 176 ER 487) spitting (Note: Smith (1866) F&F 1066; 176 ER 910) and cutting someone's hair without their consent. (Note: Smith [2006] EWHC 94 (admin)) This also includes contact with the victim's clothing, a rule dating back to 1845 in R v Day. It is not necessary that the victim feels the touching.

The required causation may be quite oblique. As well as weaponry held in the hand, weaponry thrown is included, as is causing people to touch each other by creating a sense of panic. (Note: Martin (1881) 8 QBD 54 (CCR)) The general law on liability for omissions also applies to batteries, for example those of the continuing act (as in Fagan v MPC) and of a duty of care. However, in R v Ireland the court ruled out psychological injury by means of a telephone as a form of battery, although it was not an important point in the case as other charges were brought. Poisoning is not a battery where there is no accompanying violence.

The case of R v Brown (Note: [1994] 1 AC 212) established a further requirement: hostility. This is not easily called an actus reus nor mens rea requirement. It was not clear what role it played in that case, but could apply to other cases as a way of clarifying the "everyday behaviour" guidance. It has been strongly criticised by Lord Goff and other judicial and academic writers. It could apply to future cases where the bodily harm was unintended or unforeseen.

The mens rea requirement for battery is similar to assault. It is the intention to apply unlawful force to another, or be reckless as to whether such force is applied. It employs Cunningham recklessness – that the defendant must have foreseen the risk of the infliction of unlawful force upon V. In theory, at least, combining the mens rea of battery with the actus reus of assault, or vice versa, is not a crime. The Majewski test is applied to cases of voluntary intoxication, as battery is also a crime of "basic intent" in this scenario.

== Assault occasioning actual bodily harm ==
Assault occasioning actual bodily harm carries a maximum sentence of 5 years under section 47 of the Offences against the Person Act 1861. It is triable either way. Both assault (fear of violence) and battery (infliction of violence) are included, although it is possible to consider section 47 as creating two offences – one involving an assault, and one a battery. "Occasioning" is generally taken to mean "causing" although John Gardner has argued that it is wider than that. In discussing causation, 'frightened' people are not expected to act entirely rationally; instead, a relevant test is that of R v Roberts. (Note: 56 Cr App R 95 (CA)) There, any conduct of the victim short of "daft" could be considered caused by the defendant's actions. Only the seriousness of the injury separates an assault from an assault occasioning actual bodily harm.

The concept of "actual bodily harm" is wide. Almost all injuries are included – for example, bruising or skin abrasions. Injuries are not included if they are "transient or trifling", (Note: Donovan [1934] 2 KB 498 CCA) but this did not cover even momentary unconsciousness. (Note: T v DPP [2003] EWHC 266 (admin)) The wide range of injuries give prosecutors considerable discretion about which charge to bring against a defendant. Psychological injury is included, so long as it forms a recognised medical condition. Mere fright or anxiety is insufficient for actual bodily harm. It is limited only by the need for an actual assault or battery to have taken place.

There is no separate mens rea element from the assault or battery, making this a crime of constructive liability. This has been defended by John Gardner, a proponent of the moral threshold theory. However, this is opposed by Simester and Sullivan.

== Maliciously wounding or inflicting grievous bodily harm ==
Section 20 of the Offences against the Person Act 1861 criminalises "whosoever shall unlawfully and maliciously wound or inflict any grievous bodily harm upon any other person, either with or without any weapon or instrument". The maximum penalty, five years, is the same as that for actual bodily harm, but a section 20 offence is considered more serious by the courts and the Crown Prosecution Service. A judge is free on the facts of the case to allow a jury find a defendant guilty of assault occasioning actual bodily harm where a defendant is charged with a section 20 offence.

The actus reus is the wound or infliction of grievous bodily harm (GBH). A "wound" is something that breaks all layers of the skin, and must have an external component – internal bleeding, however serious, is not a wound. Serious wounds would also fall under grievous bodily harm, but some qualifying wounds (a pin prick, for example) are very minor. Some wounds would therefore not qualify as grievous bodily harm.

The phrase "really serious harm" was used to describe grievous bodily harm in R v Metheram. (Note: [1961] 3 All ER 200) The case of R v Grundy (Note: [1977] Crim LR 543) confirmed that injuries should be taken in their totality; that many small injuries may form a serious harm. R v Bollom (Note: [2004] 2 Cr App R 50) confirmed the Grundy approach, and also showed that grievous bodily harm against a child was likely to require less bodily harm than that against an adult. R v Burstow (Note: [1998] AC 147) extended "bodily harm" to include psychological trauma if it formed a recognised serious mental condition. Simester et al said that this could have wide-reaching consequences, but it is unlikely to be taken to include commonplace occurrences (relationship breakups, verbal cruelty, broken promises) – in Burstow, the conduct included a prolonged and intense campaign of harassment.

For a long time, R v Clarence was taken as an authority on the meaning of "inflict", which the court took to mean "an assault or battery of which a wound or grievous bodily harm is the manifest immediate and obvious result". (Note: (1888) 22 QBD 23) This narrow definition was extended in R v Martin (Note: (1881) 8 QBD 54) and R v Halliday (Note: [1886–90] All ER 1028) to include, for example, injuries sustained during an attempt of the victim to flee. An injury is said to be "inflicted" if it is the result of an impact or percussion set in motion by the defendant; the injury must relate directly to the impact or percussion, but the impact or percussion may be an indirect effect of the defendant's actions. R v Burstow established that "inflict" was a near synonym of cause: in Lord Hope's view, they were synonymous, except that the outcome of the former must be unpleasant. This was applied in R v Dica (Note: [2004] QB 1257) and R v Konzani, (Note: [2005] EWCA Crim 706) two cases of knowingly risking passing on HIV without explicit consent.

The mens rea element is that of "malice", which means either intention or recklessness. Cunningham recklessness is applied. (Note: Savage [1992] 1 AC 699) However, for the purposes of recklessness, foresight of even minor harm is sufficient – it does not require foresight of serious harm. This has been criticised since it breaks the correspondence principle, that the mens rea should match the actus reus of an offence.

== Wounding or causing grievous bodily harm with intent ==
The crime of wounding with intent is created by section 18 of the Offences against the Person Act 1861. It reads, since amended, as: "Whosoever shall unlawfully and maliciously by any means whatsoever wound or cause any grievous bodily harm to any person... with intent... to do some... grievous bodily harm to any person, or with intent to resist or prevent the lawful apprehension or detainer of any person...". This creates four forms of the offence: unlawfully and maliciously wounding, with intent to either do grievous bodily harm (1) or resist arrest (2); and unlawfully and maliciously causing grievous bodily harm, with intent to either do grievous bodily harm (3) or resist arrest (4). Thus forms (1) and (3) differ from section 20 offences mainly in that there is a specific intention to cause serious harm rather than some harm, and they are therefore the more serious charges. On an indictment under section 18, the jury is open to convict under section 20 or section 47 if properly directed.

"Wounding" and "causing grievous bodily harm" are defined in the same way as they are in the crime of maliciously wounding or inflicting grievous bodily harm. Grievous bodily harm includes serious psychological trauma and serious infection; however, these are less controversial here because of the inclusion of intent. Intent narrows the crime considerably, and the term "inflict" is not used. In form (3), intent can be simply decided in the case of a direct attack, or "virtual certainty", with knowledge of the virtual certainty – the Woollin (Note: Woollin [1999] AC 82 (HL)) principle. In form (1), where an injury does not amount to grievous bodily harm, intent to cause grievous bodily harm (in the advancement of a different cause) must be shown. Practically, the "virtual certainty" clause cannot come into force, since grievous bodily harm was not actually caused, by definition. In forms (2) and (4), the concept of "malice" has a role to play that it does not in (1) and (3). The defendant must foresee the risk of wounding or grievous bodily harm, where the core intent is to resist arrest. The defendant cannot be reckless to the resisting of arrest, it must be an intention. Concerning the requirement to resist a lawful arrest, the defendant only lacks the required mens rea if he believes in facts which, if true, would make the arrest unlawful; not just that he believes the facts as they are make the arrest illegal – a mistake of fact suffices, a mistake of law does not.

== Other offences and issues ==
There also exist alternative forms of aggravated assault in English law, for example: assault or battery with intent to resist arrest (as above, the arrest must be lawful); and assault on, resistance to, and obstruction of constables. Under the Crime and Disorder Act 1998, it is also possible to commit a racially aggravated assault. This is where the commission of the assault in combination to hostility towards the victim, based on their race or believed race, or association with a race. "Race" includes skin colour, nationality, citizenship, and ethnic or national origins. Administering poison, either contrary to section 23 or 24 of the Offences against the Person Act 1861, is also an offence; as is false imprisonment – including unlawful arrest, kidnap and hostage situations. Legislation aimed at the possession or use of firearms may also come into this category, as may bomb hoaxes.

There are also offences of aggravated assault, created under the Offences against the Person Act 1861, that now go almost completely unused: for example, assaulting or obstructing a clergyman in the discharge of his duties, and assaulting a magistrate or other person in the exercise of his duties concerning the preservation of a vessel in distress or a wreck.

An assault is not caused if a defendant threatens to shoot the victim, but the victim is aware that the gun is not loaded or fake. However, it would be the actus reus of an assault if the victim wrongly believes the gun is, or may be, loaded. Since assault is a summary offence, no prosecutions take place for attempted assault. However, it is possible to commit attempts of aggravated forms of assault.
