= 2025 Liverpool parade attack =

Traffic collision in Liverpool, England

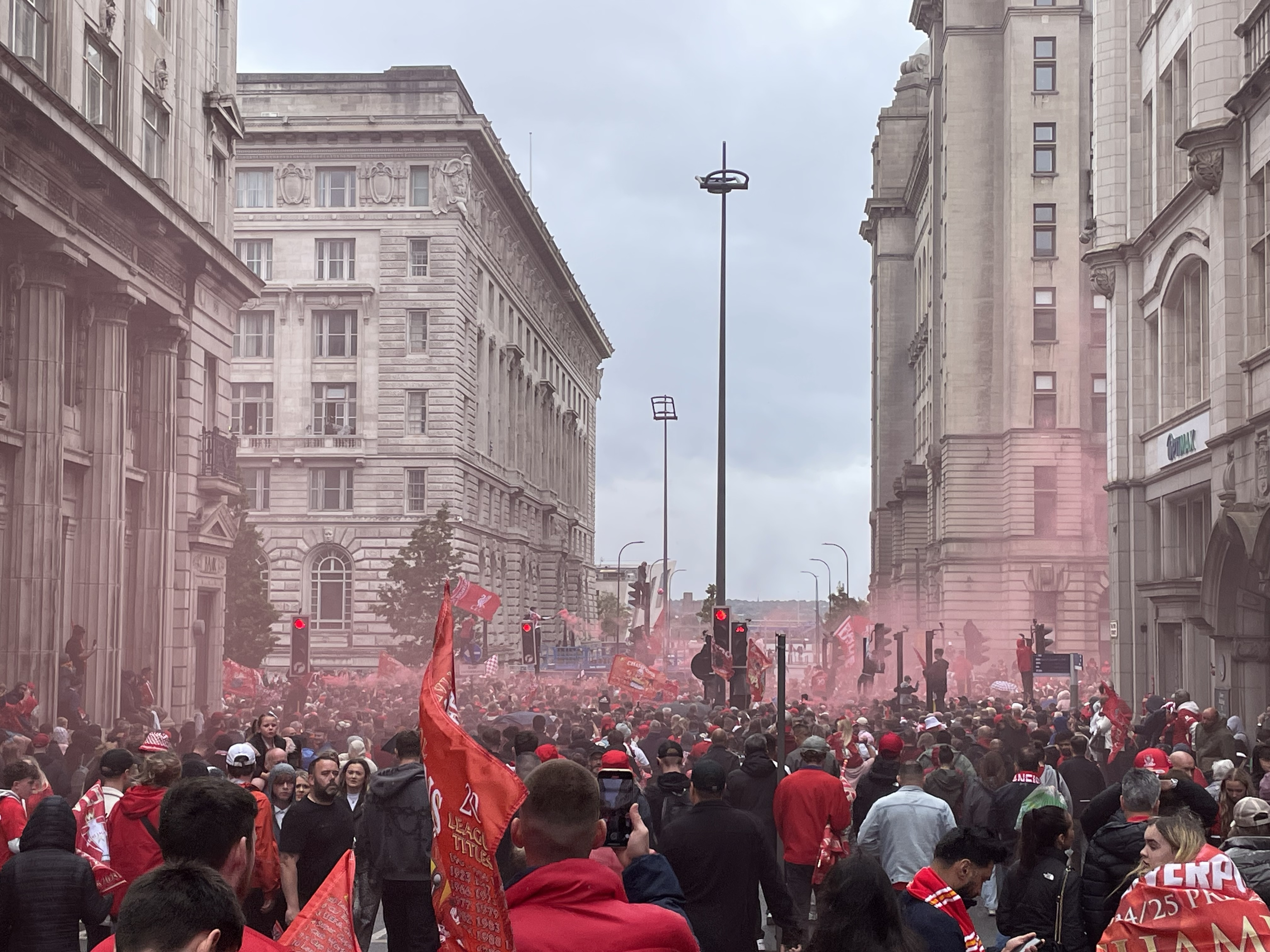
- Location: 53.4062°N 2.9935°W; Water Street, Liverpool, England
- Date: 26 May 2025; 6 pm (BST)
- Weapon: Ford Galaxy
- Deaths: 0
- Injuries: 130+
- Perpetrator: Paul Doyle
- Charges: Dangerous driving; Unlawful and malicious wounding with intent to cause grievous bodily harm (3 counts); Causing unlawful and malicious grievous bodily harm with intent to cause grievous bodily harm (7 counts); Attempted unlawful and malicious grievous bodily harm with intent to cause grievous bodily harm (19 counts); Affray (1 count)
- Convicted: 1
- Judge: Andrew Menary KC

On 26 May 2025, Paul Doyle drove a grey Ford Galaxy into a crowd on Water Street in Liverpool, England, during a victory parade celebrating Liverpool Football Club's 2024–25 Premier League title win. Over 130 people were injured; at least 50 were taken to hospital, including four children.

Merseyside Police arrested Doyle at the scene and issued seven charges: one count of dangerous driving; two counts of unlawful and malicious wounding with intent to cause grievous bodily harm; two counts of causing unlawful and malicious grievous bodily harm with intent to cause grievous bodily harm; and two counts of attempted unlawful and malicious grievous bodily harm with intent to cause grievous bodily harm. He appeared at Liverpool Crown Court on 30 May and was remanded in custody. On 26 November 2025, at the start of his trial, Doyle pleaded guilty to all 31 offences, and on 16 December, he was sentenced to 21 years and 6 months in prison.

== Background ==
Prior to the incident, locals and supporters of Liverpool F.C. were watching the team's city-wide victory parade to celebrate their victory in the 2024–25 Premier League. Scottish newspaper The National stated an estimated one million people were in attendance, though no source of the estimation was given. The open-top bus carrying the football club's team and staff members took a 10-mile (16 km) route starting at Allerton Maze and ending at The Strand in the city centre. St John Ambulance were providing event cover for the parade, including 12 ambulances. The incident took place 10 minutes after the bus had passed through the area.

Earlier in the day, at 12:34 BST, Doyle had given his friend and his family a lift to the city to watch the parade, in his grey Ford Galaxy.

Later, Doyle was in the city to collect them. At 17:59 BST, Doyle reached "traffic implementation measures" on Dale Street, filtering vehicles to the right. Despite stopping, he shortly continued down the left of Dale Street, driving towards Water Street.

== Incident ==
Between 17:59 and 18:01 BST, Doyle, having argued with pedestrians, had driven his vehicle into the crowd, causing serious injuries to many people, trapping people beneath the vehicle during the parade. According to a witness, the vehicle then stopped and people began smashing its windows, but Doyle accelerated again and collided with more people. In footage from Doyle's dashboard camera, he was heard shouting "move" and swearing at the crowd, including after a 10-year-old girl was struck. Once the vehicle was stationary, some fans attempted to drag Doyle from the vehicle, and he suffered minor injuries whilst under the protection of police officers.

By 7 pm a North West Air Ambulance had landed at the scene, and tents were set up nearby. By 9:30 pm North West Ambulance Service said it had cleared the scene. Police eventually identified 79 injured people ranging in age from 9 to 78; at least 50 had been taken to hospital. Three adults and one child had been removed from beneath the vehicle. Police later confirmed an additional thirty injured people, bringing the total to 109. The total number injured was later reported at over 130 people.

== Investigation ==
Merseyside Police said they had detained a 53-year-old white British man who was from West Derby and that counter-terrorism police were supporting their investigation. He was arrested at the scene, and is believed by police to be the driver of the vehicle. Police said they were treating the incident as isolated and not related to terrorism.

Reuters said that police were "unusually quick to give a description of the man they arrested" to head off speculation of a religious motive after riots took place following misinformation spread about the 2024 Southport stabbings. According to Jonathan Hall KC, the government's Independent Reviewer of Terrorism Legislation, the decision should set a precedent for transparency in almost all future incidents.

Merseyside Police said in a press conference at 3:30 pm on 27 May that the man detained had been arrested on suspicion of attempted murder, dangerous driving and driving while unfit through drugs. However, later, it was found that Doyle was neither intoxicated through drink or drugs.

Doyle's vehicle was seized and examined. Vehicle experts found there were no significant defects that would have impacted the control of the vehicle. Footage from the dashboard camera demonstrated that Doyle was lucid throughout and did not suffer a medical episode.

Water Street was reopened on the morning of 28 May. The same day police reported they had been given more time to question the suspect. When Doyle was interviewed, he claimed that he acted in a "blind panic" and was "in fear of his life" because of the behaviour of some of the people in the crowd towards him.

Police reviewing CCTV identified the car being driven along Dale Street, which leads into Water Street and was also densely packed with crowds at the time, shortly before the incident on Water Street.

== Legal proceedings ==
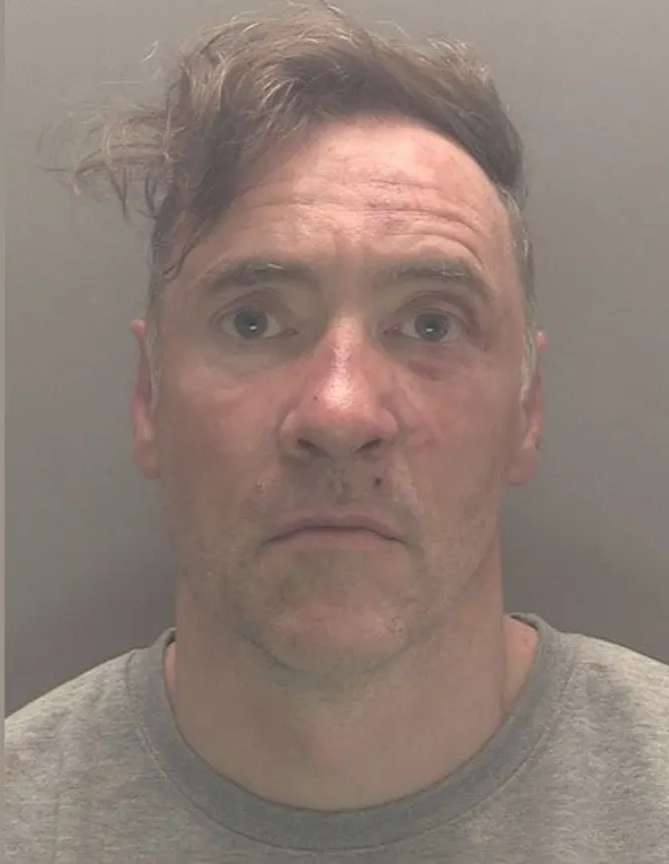
Mugshot of Doyle

On 29 May, the 53-year-old suspect, Paul Doyle, was named by police and was charged with seven offences: one count of dangerous driving; two counts of unlawful and malicious wounding with intent to cause grievous bodily harm; two counts of causing unlawful and malicious grievous bodily harm with intent to cause grievous bodily harm; and two counts of attempted unlawful and malicious grievous bodily harm with intent to cause grievous bodily harm. He appeared at Liverpool Magistrates' Court on 30 May, but was not asked to enter a plea. He then appeared at Liverpool Crown Court in the afternoon of that day for a hearing before the Recorder of Liverpool, Judge Andrew Menary KC. He was remanded in custody at HMP Wakefield.

On 14 August, the accused appeared at Liverpool Crown Court via video-link from custody, where prosecutors filed 24 additional charges. These included 23 counts relating to injuries sustained by victims—among them two infants, for whom the charges included attempted grievous bodily harm with intent—and one count of affray. The prosecution's case was that Doyle had used his vehicle as a weapon, having lost his temper and driven into the crowd in a rage. Defence counsel requested additional time to review the expanded indictment, and no pleas were entered during the hearing. On 4 September, he pleaded not guilty to all charges. He was remanded in custody until the next court hearing on 27 October.

A trial began on 25 November. On 26 November, Doyle changed his plea to guilty on all 31 charges. On 16 December, he was sentenced to 21 years and 6 months in prison. The judge said that Doyle had generated "fear and panic" and his "disregard for human life defied ordinary understanding".

== Perpetrator ==
Paul Desmond Sanders Doyle was born on 4 November 1971. In 1989, aged 18, Doyle joined the Royal Engineers, where he committed his first military offence, being convicted of an equivalent to common assault on 12 December that year. Doyle received a seven-day detention. The following year, in March, Doyle was convicted of a "minor offence of dishonesty", for which he received a fine. On 11 March 1991, Doyle enlisted in the Royal Marines, signing for 22 years' service, but would be discharged less than 22 months later due to his repeated misconduct. In October that year, while still in training, Doyle got involved in a fight at a nightclub, during which he punched a man in the face several times. Consequently, Doyle was convicted of assault and fined £45. In 1992, Doyle committed two further military offences, one of using violence against a superior officer, for which he was fined £250, and another when he broke a shop window. Doyle was discharged from the Royal Marines in January 1993, having been given a Services No Longer Required notice, but remained a reservist. On 2 July, Doyle got into a drunken fight at a pub, during which he bit a man's ear off. Consequently, on 3 November, Doyle was convicted of grievous bodily harm and sentenced to 12 months in prison. A marine that served alongside Doyle said of him: "Everyone would say: 'He's got a horrendous flash to bang' – meaning the point you get annoyed to the point you're punching people is zero time." Doyle never saw active service during his time in the military.

Doyle was released from prison in May 1995 and was not convicted of any other offences up until the parade attack in 2025. In the time after his release, Doyle attended the University of Liverpool and graduated with a BSc in maths and psychology in 1998. After graduating, Doyle worked as a manager at a McDonald's branch and went on to work in various positions in IT across his adult life. Organisations that Doyle worked for over his career included Littlewoods, an NHS trust, and Rathbones Group. At the time of the attack, Doyle's LinkedIn page stated that he worked as "Head of Cyber" at at firm called the "Hyper Scale Data Centre", which the Liverpool Echo was unable to find record of, and also listed him as a "volunteer ethical hacker". Doyle had also headed two companies, both of which were dissolved by the time of the attack, named Runcool Ltd. and FarOut Caps, focused on sports goods and Vin Diesel-inspired hats respectively.

By March 2025, Doyle was reported to have been married to his wife for 20 years and had three teenaged sons, with whom he had been living with in the Croxteth area of Liverpool for 10 years. Neighbours of Doyle spoke positively of him as a family man, and expressed bewilderment at his criminal actions. One neighbour said of Doyle "He idolised his kids, and they loved him back," "He was a nice family guy, someone around to chat to on the estate or offer a bit of help when you were in the garden. You’d never believe he’d do something like this, it’s mad.” Up until his eventual guilty plea, Doyle had maintained that, on the day of the parade attack, he acted out of self preservation, fearing for his safety. No other motive for the attack has been offered by Doyle. Doyle is currently serving his sentence at HMP Wakefield.

== Reactions ==
King Charles III said that the "strength of community spirit for which Liverpool is renowned will be a comfort and support to those in need"; the prime minister, Sir Keir Starmer, visited the city to speak with local police chiefs on the afternoon of 28 May. Staff at the Royal Liverpool University Hospital cancelled planned strike action in response; Anne, Princess Royal, visited the injured there on 27 May.

== Subsequent events ==
The final person to leave hospital following treatment was discharged on 30 June, having spent 35 days in hospital.
