= Common assault =

Offence in English law

Common assault is an offence in English law. It is committed by a person who causes another person to apprehend the immediate use of unlawful violence by the defendant. In England and Wales, the penalty and mode of trial for this offence is provided by section 39 of the Criminal Justice Act 1988.

== Statute ==
Section 39 of the Criminal Justice Act 1988 provides:

Common assault and battery shall be summary offences and a person guilty of either of them shall be liable to a fine not exceeding level 5 on the standard scale, to imprisonment for a term not exceeding six months, or to both.

On 13 September 2018, the Assaults on Emergency Workers (Offences) Act 2018 received Royal Assent. This added a subsection which states any common assault or battery on an emergency worker (as defined in the Act) is triable either way and subject to a maximum of 12 months' imprisonment if tried on indictment.

== Ingredients of the offence ==
Section 39 of the Criminal Justice Act 1988 does not contain a definition of the expression "common assault" that appears there. What the offence actually consists of must be determined by reference to case law.

A person commits an assault if they perform an act (which does not for this purpose include a mere omission to act) by which they intentionally or recklessly cause another person to apprehend immediate unlawful violence.

=== Actus reus ===
Both in the common law and under statute, the actus reus of a common assault is committed when one person causes another to apprehend or fear that force is about to be used to cause some degree of personal contact and possible injury. There must be some quality of reasonableness to the apprehension on the part of the victim. If the physical contact is everyday social behaviour such as a handshake or friendly pat on the back, this is acceptable, even in situations where the victim may have a phobia, however if the defendant is aware of the victim's fears and carries out the action anyway, this may be converted into an assault if the intention is to exploit the condition and embarrass the victim. More generally, if the defendant threatens injury tomorrow, the victim has the opportunity to take avoiding action. Thus, what is threatened must be capable of being carried out immediately. This would exclude a conditional threat. For example, if the defendant says that they "would beat the living daylights out of you if not for the presence of a police officer", the victim is supposed to understand that there is no immediate danger (cf. Tuberville v Savage's "If it were not assize time I would not take such language from you"). But inequality in size can be disregarded so if a very small person threatens a very large person and it is obvious that the risk of any real injury from this attack is remote, the large person may nevertheless feel some degree of apprehension. Normally, both the one making the threat and the victim must be physically present because, otherwise, there would be no immediate danger. However, if a mobile phone is used to transmit the threat (whether orally or by SMS) and, from the words used, the victim reasonably understands that an attack is imminent, this may constitute an assault.

In Fagan v Metropolitan Police Commissioner a police officer ordered the defendant to park his car and he reluctantly complied. In doing so, he accidentally drove the car on to the policeman's foot and, when asked to remove the car, said "Fuck you, you can wait" and turned off the ignition. Because of the steel toe cap in his boot, the policeman's foot was not in actual danger, but the Divisional Court held that this could constitute an assault. Albeit accidentally, the driver had caused his car to rest on the officer's foot. This actus reus was a continuing act and the mens rea was formed during the relevant time (see concurrence). Whether realistically or not, the officer apprehended the possibility of injury so the offence was complete.

In R v Ireland, it was found that causing a person to apprehend violence can be committed by way of action or words. Words can also mean that otherwise threatening actions are rendered not capable of being an assault, as in the case of Tuberville v Savage. In that case, the plaintiff told the defendant (while putting his hand on his sword) that he would not stab him, because the circuit judge was visiting town for the local assizes. On that basis, the defendant was deemed to have known that he was not about to be injured, and it was held that no assault had been committed by the plaintiff (which would otherwise have justified the defendant's allegedly pre-emptive strike).

The "immediacy" requirement has been the subject of some debate. The leading case, again, is R v Ireland. Therein, the House of Lords held that the making of silent telephone calls could amount to an assault if it caused the victim to believe that physical violence might be used against him in the immediate future. One example of "immediacy" adopted by the House in that case was that a man who said, "I will be at your door in a minute or two", might (in the circumstances where those words amounted to a threat) be guilty of an assault.

See also R v Constanza.

=== Mens rea ===
The mens rea is that this fear must have been caused either intentionally or recklessly. A battery is committed when the threatened force actually results in contact to the other and that contact was caused either intentionally or recklessly.

=== Defences ===
Self-defence is available when reasonable force is used to prevent harm to self or another. Prevention of a greater crime or with the purpose of aiding a lawful arrest is also known as the public defence. The private defence or defence of property also may be used as an argument. These arguments are not strictly defences but justifications for a certain level of force.

Consent also negates assault (but not more serious offences, per R v Brown). Ordinary, harmless contact is considered of the sort one might encounter while travelling on a busy bus or train or trying to get to the bar in a packed pub is not considered assault, nor are genuine tackles in contact sports like football or rugby. Preventing someone accidentally endangering themselves would also generally not amount to assault.

== Alternative verdict ==
The original effect of sections 39 and 40 of the Criminal Justice Act 1988 was that common assault was not available as an alternative verdict under section 6(3) of the Criminal Law Act 1967.

Common assault is now available as an alternative verdict under section 6(3) of the Criminal Law Act 1967, by virtue of section 6(3A) of that Act (which was inserted by section 11 of the Domestic Violence, Crime and Victims Act 2004).

== Whether it is a statutory offence ==
In DPP v Taylor, DPP v Little it was held that common assault is a statutory offence, contrary to section 39 of the Criminal Justice Act 1988. This decision was criticised and in Haystead v DPP the Divisional court expressed the obiter opinion that common assault remains a common law offence.

== Mode of trial and sentence ==
In England and Wales, it is a summary offence. However, where section 40 of the Criminal Justice Act 1988 applies, it can be an additional charge on an indictment. It is usually tried summarily.

However, if it is tried, it is punishable with imprisonment for a term not exceeding six months, or a fine not exceeding level 5 on the standard scale, or both.

See Crown Prosecution Service Sentencing Manual for case law on sentencing. Relevant cases are:

- R v Nottingham Crown Court ex parte Director of Public Prosecutions
- R v Dunn

== Racially or religiously aggravated offence ==
In England and Wales, section 29(1)(c) of the Crime and Disorder Act 1998 (c.37) creates the distinct offence of racially or religiously aggravated common assault.

== Status of the offence ==
Common assault is the least serious assault. It is common for more serious assault charges to be reduced to common assault in "plea bargaining" by prosecutors to avoid the additional expense of a Crown Court trial for a more serious either-way offence should the defendant elect for one. In real terms, the degree of fear or the level of injury required for a conviction can be unproven. No injury is required to prove battery.

== See also ==
- Battery
- Assault occasioning actual bodily harm
- Grievous bodily harm
