= Duplicity =

Duplicity may refer to:

- Duplicity (play), a 1781 comedy by Thomas Holcroft
- Duplicity (Silent Descent album), 2000
- Duplicity (Lee Konitz and Martial Solal album), 1978
- Duplicity (TV series), a 2016 Nigerian drama series
- Duplicity (2009 film), a comedy thriller starring Clive Owen and Julia Roberts
- Duplicity (2025 film), an American mystery thriller film
- Duplicity (law), when the charge on an indictment describes two different offences
- Duplicity Remix, an EP by English trance metal band Silent Descent
- "Duplicity" (Revenge), an episode of the American television series Revenge
- "Duplicity" (Smallville), an episode of Smallville
- Duplicity (software), provides easy encrypted versioned remote backup of files
