= Assault (tort) =

Tort of intentional, offensive contact

In common law, assault is the tort of acting intentionally, that is with either general or specific intent, causing the reasonable apprehension of an immediate harmful or offensive contact. Assault requires intent, it is considered an intentional tort, as opposed to a tort of negligence. Actual ability to carry out the apprehended contact is not necessary. 'The conduct forbidden by this tort is an act that threatens violence.'

In criminal law an assault is defined as an attempt to commit battery, requiring the specific intent to cause physical injury.

== Comparison to battery ==
As distinguished from battery, assault does not need to involve the 'unwanted physical contact; but is the anticipation of such contact'. It only needs intent to make or threaten contact and the resulting apprehension. At one point, the common law understanding of assault required more than words alone, it also required an overt act. This understanding has changed, while words alone cannot be construed as assault, words coinciding with actions or circumstances that would put a person in reasonable apprehension that a harm or offensive contact was likely to occur would. For example, an actor shouting "I'm going to kill you" while not moving but in complete shadow and with a knife in their hand could be interpreted as assault.

Additionally, fear is not required for an assault to occur, only anticipation of subsequent battery. A battery can occur without a preceding assault, such as if a person is struck in the back of the head. An assault can be an attempted battery.

I.e. 'If Henry points a gun at Thomas he has committed an assault. It makes no difference whether the gun is loaded,' But 'Henry will only commit a battery if he shoots the gun and hits Thomas'.

== Elements ==
Defined by Collins v Wilcock as 'an act which causes another person to apprehend the infliction of immediate unlawful force on his person', 'assault protects the claimant who fears or apprehends a battery.' Three elements must be established in order to establish tortious assault: first, there must be a positive act by the defendant; second, the plaintiff had reasonable apprehension (the requisite state of mind) of immediate physical contact, and third, the defendant's act of interference was intentional (the defendant intended the resulting apprehension).

An actionable assault requires that:

- 'the defendant intends that the claimant apprehends the application of unlawful force;
- the claimant reasonably apprehends the immediate and direct application of unlawful force;
- for which the defendant has no lawful justification or excuse.'

But intent for purposes of civil assault can be either general or specific. Specific intent means that when the defendant acted, he or she intended to cause apprehension of a harmful or unwanted contact. General intent means that the defendant knew with substantial certainty that the action would put someone in apprehension of a harmful or unwanted contact.

- While the law varies by jurisdiction, contact is often defined as harmful if it objectively intends to injure, disfigure, impair, or cause pain.
- The act is deemed offensive if it would offend a reasonable person's sense of personal dignity.
- While imminence is judged objectively and varies widely on the facts, it generally suggests there is little to no opportunity for intervening acts.
- Lastly, the state of apprehension should be differentiated from the general state of fear, as apprehension requires only that the person be aware of the imminence of the harmful or offensive act.

It is clear that 'all forms of trespass require an intentional act. An act of negligence will not suffice.' There must be capacity and immediacy - simply threatening someone will not suffice.

Whilst it has been speculated that words alone do not constitute assault, there must be an act (I.e. in R v Meade), this was questioned in R v Ireland it was held that repeated silent telephone calls being made can constitute an assault:

'The proposition that a gesture may amount to an assault, but that words can never suffice, is unrealistic and indefensible.' - Lord Steyn

Moreover, In Australia, the test for proving tortious assault is formulated as requiring 'proof of an intention to create in another person an apprehension of imminent harmful or offensive contact' .

== Different types of assault ==
=== Conditional assault ===
This is whereby someone puts a condition on their assault. In the case of Read v Coker, where the claimant was threatened by a group of people who said: 'if you don't leave we will break your neck.' The court held the defendants were liable for tortious assault. Moreover, Jervis CJ stated: 'If anything short of actual striking will in law constitute an assault, the facts here clearly showed that D was guilty of an assault.'

=== Words negating an assault to a certain extent ===
Whilst it was held in Tuberville v Savage, where the plaintiff said 'If it were not assize time, I would not take such language from you,' whilst showing his sword, that words negating an assault is not an assault. This was because 'the intention as well as the act makes an assault' and 'the court agreed it was not; for the declaration of the plaintiff was, that he would not assault him,'.

However, words negating an assault to a certain extent is an assault. "If one, intending to assault: so if he held up his hand against another in a threatening manner and say nothing, it is an assault.-'. For example, If person A held a knife to right up to person B's throat and said: "because there are people around I won't cut you", this would be enough to warrant an assault. This was clarified in R v Light where the defendant held a spade over his wife's head and said 'if that police officer wasn't outside, I would hurt you'. This was held to warrant an assault, words can only negate an assault to a certain extent. If there is a weapon in hand then the words you say are unlikely to negate your assault. 'There is an obvious proximity in time and place.' and a viable threat of real, imminent harm.

== Defences ==
Assault can be justified in situations where there is 'lawful justification or excuse' for their actions such as: self-defense or defense of a third party where the act was deemed reasonable and necessary. It can also be justified in the context of a sport where consent may be given or implied. An act of assault may also be privileged, meaning that the person who commits the assault had the legal right to do so and cannot be sued, as might occur if a police officer draws a firearm on a criminal suspect. Lastly, automatism (e.g., sleep walking) acts to negate the intent element as someone acting while asleep is not acting voluntarily.

== Damages ==
The claimant could be awarded nominal damage, if no harm came to them because this tort is actionable per se. Additionally, they could be entitled to: compensatory damages whereby you try and put the claimant in the position they would have been in before the assault occurred, or the claimant could be entitled to an injunction whereby you try and stop repeated behaviour occurring by setting conditions and finally, aggravated damages may be awarded which are awarded if the tort is found to be an affront to someone's dignity.

== See also ==
- Assault
- Battery (crime)
- Battery (tort)
- Damages
- Injunction
