= Silent Descent (EP) =

EP by Silent Descent
- Released: 11 February 2005
- Genre: Melodic death metal, alternative metal
- Producer: Tom Callahan

Silent Descent chronology
Silent Descent (2005)	Duplicity (2008)

Silent Descent is a 5-track self-titled EP by English melodic death metal band Silent Descent. It was released on 11 February 2005. The EP was Silent Descent's first release and stylistically bears little resemblance to the group's later material.

== Track listing ==
No.	Title	Length
1.	"Heart Of Stone"
2.	"With-In-Justice"
3.	"Deceit"
4.	"Fallen Angels"
5.	"Love In A Thousand Pieces"

== Personnel ==
- Tom Watling – lead vocals
- Tom Callahan – rhythm guitar, bass
- Nik King – lead guitar, bass
- Elliot Philpot – drums
