= Homicide in English law =

Overview of homicide in the laws of England and Wales

English law contains homicide offences – those acts involving the death of another person. For a crime to be considered homicide, it must take place after the victim's legally recognised birth, and before their legal death. There is also the usually uncontroversial requirement that the victim be under the "King's peace". The death must be causally linked to the actions of the defendant. Since the abolition of the year and a day rule, there is no maximum time period between any act being committed and the victim's death, so long as the former caused the latter.

There are two general types of homicide, murder and manslaughter. Murder requires an intention to kill or an intention to commit grievous bodily harm. If this intention is present but there are certain types of mitigating factors – loss of control, diminished responsibility, or pursuance of a suicide pact – then this is voluntary manslaughter. There are two types of involuntary manslaughter. Firstly, it may be "constructive" or "unlawful act" manslaughter, where a lesser but inherently criminal and dangerous act has caused the death. Alternatively, manslaughter may be caused by gross negligence, where the defendant has broken a duty of care over the victim, where that breach has led to the death, and is sufficiently gross as to warrant criminalisation.

== General features ==
Death is an irremediable harm that is dealt with particularly seriously in English law. For example, the crime of murder uniquely carries a mandatory sentence of life imprisonment, regardless of the degree to which the defendant is morally culpable provided they are legally culpable. To use another example: causing injury by dangerous driving carries a maximum sentence of two years, whereas causing death by dangerous driving carries one of fourteen years.

All homicides involve three elements as a defining feature: firstly, that the victim must be a legally defined "human being"; that their death must be caused by the act or omission of one or more human beings; and that this must occur within the "King's peace", which relates to jurisdiction.

=== Birth and death ===
A fetus, even at a late stage of pregnancy, is not protected by the law of homicide due to abortion rights in the United Kingdom. (rather, other offences have been created to prevent the proscribed harm (Note: For example, child destruction (Infant Life (Preservation) Act 1929) and unlawfully procuring a miscarriage (Offences Against the Person Act, section 58.))). To qualify, the victim must have an "independent existence". This was confirmed in 1998 in Attorney General's Reference (No. 3 of 1994), (Note: [1998] AC 245 [HL]) even where the foetus is viable and could have survived if born before the offence was committed. The confused rationale appears to match the complicated moral and biological distinction on which it is based; there is huge social significance placed upon birth and thus the law is unlikely to change – Article 2 of the European Convention on Human Rights has not yet been interpreted to conflict with the English law. Instead, in Vo v France, the European Court of Human Rights ruled that most definitions were within the margin of appreciation set aside to national law. The death of a child after birth from injuries sustained before birth would only constitute murder if the requisite intent – that the child would die after birth – was present. Other forms of homicide would also be applicable.

There is no legislation that defines when death has occurred. However, in Airedale NHS Trust v Bland, (Note: [1993] 1 AC 789 (HL)) cessation of brain stem function, one form of brain death, was considered the definition by the House of Lords. Much medical law – for example, that conferring the right to remove organs for transplant – is predicated on this decision and it is unlikely to be overturned. The Criminal Law Revision Committee has declined to propose a legal definition, for fear of the wide impact that it could have on disparate branches of the law, and the changing basis in medical science. In Bland, a person in a persistent vegetative state was considered to be alive; accordingly, anything less than brain stem cessation is unlikely to be sufficient for death.

=== Causation ===
The normal rules of causation apply, although they can become strained when compared to the various moral issues of importance in cases of homicide. In R v. Pagett, (Note: (1983) 76 Cr App R 279 (CA)) the defendant was found guilty of the manslaughter of a hostage he was using as a human shield, who was killed by police returning fire against the defendant. Whether another's actions are "free, voluntary and informed" is the operating definition, as upheld in R. v Kennedy (No. 2) (Note: [2008] 1 AC 269 (HL)) where the defendant was acquitted. Such an intervening act is known as a "novus actus interveniens". The judgments of several judges in various cases, including Devlin J in R. v Adams (Note: [1957] Crim LR 365) appear to confuse causality with motive: where there is a strong moral imperative to clear the defendant, causality is doubted, rather than the mental element (mens rea). Since everyone will die at some point, then even murder is a mere acceleration of death. In Adams the question of life-shortening palliative care was approached, and the need to provide a suitable reason with which to distinguish the doctor from any other murderer.

A homicide can be brought about through act or omission. Baker, notes

"R v Evans [2009] EWCA Crim 650, [2009] 1 WLR 1999 holds that if a person merely facilitates another to create a dangerous situation for himself, that person may be held criminally liable for a homicide offence if that self-endangerment results in death. Evans's sister made an intervening choice to self-inject and it was her independent self-injection that was the direct cause of the dangerous situation. Evans's pre-existing duty of care was grounded on her act of supply and her awareness of the fact that her act of supply had facilitated the creation of a dangerous and life-threatening situation. Evans did not create the dangerous situation, but rather she merely made an indirect causative contribution to the dangerous situation. Furthermore, if she had merely supplied the drugs and had left the scene, and therefore had remained ignorant of the fact that her act of supply had resulted in a dangerous overdose situation, her act of mere supply per se would not have been sufficient for a conviction of gross negligence manslaughter."

— Baker, Dennis J, Omissions Liability for Homicide Offences: Reconciling R V Kennedy with R V Evans (May 21, 2012). (2010) 74 Journal of Criminal Law 310. Available at SSRN: http://ssrn.com/abstract=2063709

Elsewhere Baker argues:

"In R. v. Evans, Gemma Evans, a 24-year-old woman, purchased heroin and supplied her 16-year-old sister, Carly. Carly self-injected in a house in which she resided with Evans (the defendant) and her mother. After injecting the drug she developed and complained of symptoms consistent with an overdose. Evans appreciated that Carly’s condition was very serious and indicative of an overdose and, together with her mother, Andrea Townsend, who was also convicted of manslaughter, believed that she was responsible for Carly’s care. “The appellant described in a later interview with the police that she had seen that Carly’s lips had turned blue, that she was ‘in a mess’, and was incapable of responding to attempts to speak to her. The appellant and her mother decided not to seek medical assistance because they feared that they themselves and possibly Carly would get into trouble.” Instead, they put Carly in bed with the hope that she would make a miraculous recovery. The defendant and her mother checked on Carly occasionally and slept in the same room, but tragically, Carly died during the night. The medical evidence demonstrated that the cause of death was heroin poisoning. Evans and Townsend were charged with manslaughter.... Lord Judge C.J. held that Gemma Evans assisted Carly Evans to create a dangerous situation and was aware of the danger she assisted Carly to bring about for herself and that these two factors gave rise to a duty of reasonable rescue. The mother was convicted on the basis of her parental duty, which required her to take reasonable steps to summon assistance. Since Evans was an older half-sister, she was not covered by the parental duty doctrine. Instead, a new law had to be minted to catch her conduct. The new law being that mere assistance gives rise to duty of care. Since Evans assisted her sister’s overdose by supplying the drug she had a duty to summon help once she realised her sister was in peril. This category of duty is a newly minted one. Arguably, the courts cannot create further situations (or declare further relationships such as roommate/roommate) where a duty will be imposed the breach of which will amount to manslaughter. Hence, the categories should be regarded as closed. Cases not covered by the aforementioned duties should not give rise to a duty of care. It is arguable that since the conduct in R. v. Evans (assisting another to create a dangerous situation for herself) is not covered by the R. v. Miller doctrine (perpetrating an act that directly creates a dangerous situation), nor by the category of duty as set down in R. v. Stone, the Court of Appeal should have held that Evans had no duty of care. There is nothing wrong with applying R. v. Miller to a manslaughter case, but the court extended the R. v. Miller doctrine to cover mere facilitation, and then applied that new doctrine to manslaughter. The category of duty created in R. v. Evans seems to contravene the ruling in R. v. Rimmington, which holds that judges cannot extend common law offences to cover new forms of conduct. It is one thing to apply an existing doctrine to new facts, and another to apply it to conceptually different conduct such as assistance rather than perpetration."

— Dennis J. Baker, Glanville Williams: Textbook of Criminal Law, (London: Sweet & Maxwell, 2015) at paragraph 10-024.

Dennis J. Baker, Rethinking the Mental Element in Involuntary Manslaughter (2021) Journal of Criminal Law https://doi.org/10.1177/00220183211004068 ,

There are no specific rules that apply to acts or omissions in homicide: an omission is criminal if the defendant fails to prevent the avoidable death of the victim where he or she has the duty to do so and that the defendant had the capacity to do so. As noted below, unlawful omissions have been excluded from unlawful act manslaughter. Like in other areas, a duty of care may now be owed, following R. v Evans, (Note: [2009] 1 WLR 1999) even where the dangerous situation which results in the victim's death was not caused by the defendant. (Note: In R. v Miller [1983] 2 AC 161, part of the defendant's culpability was established on the converse being the case.) Medical professionals may be relieved of their responsibility to sustain a patient's life, where terminating life support is dubiously legally classified as an omission.

=== Other features ===
The year and a day rule was abolished in England and Wales by the Law Reform (Year and a Day Rule) Act 1996. As a matter of practice, the defendant may already have been prosecuted for the initial offence (for example, another offence against the person). Accordingly, the Attorney General's consent is required if more than three years has elapsed, or where the defendant has already been prosecuted in the circumstances alleged to have resulted in the victim's death.

A person who is not "under the Queen's Peace" cannot be the victim of a homicide. This includes the killing of alien enemies during a time of war. Murder or manslaughter committed by a British citizen is triable in an English (or Northern Irish) court, regardless of where the crime took place. The same is true for homicides committed on British ships or aircraft, regardless of the nationality of the offender. There are other statutory provisions which extend jurisdiction regarding types of offender on foreign ships, and, in the case of murder, terrorist activities. Although most crimes committed overseas are generally dealt with in the home jurisdiction, the Offences Against the Person Act 1861 formally brings the offences of a British citizen under the jurisdiction of the British courts, and therefore the "Queen's Peace" rule is usefully retained.

=== Defences ===
The killing of another person must be unlawful. Some defences are therefore open to the defendant, among them self-defence. Carrying a lawful activity, for example, a fully qualified doctor carrying out an abortion in the required circumstances, could not result in an unlawful homicide even if the child was born alive. Consent might be relevant to some forms of homicide, but not to murder.

== Murder ==
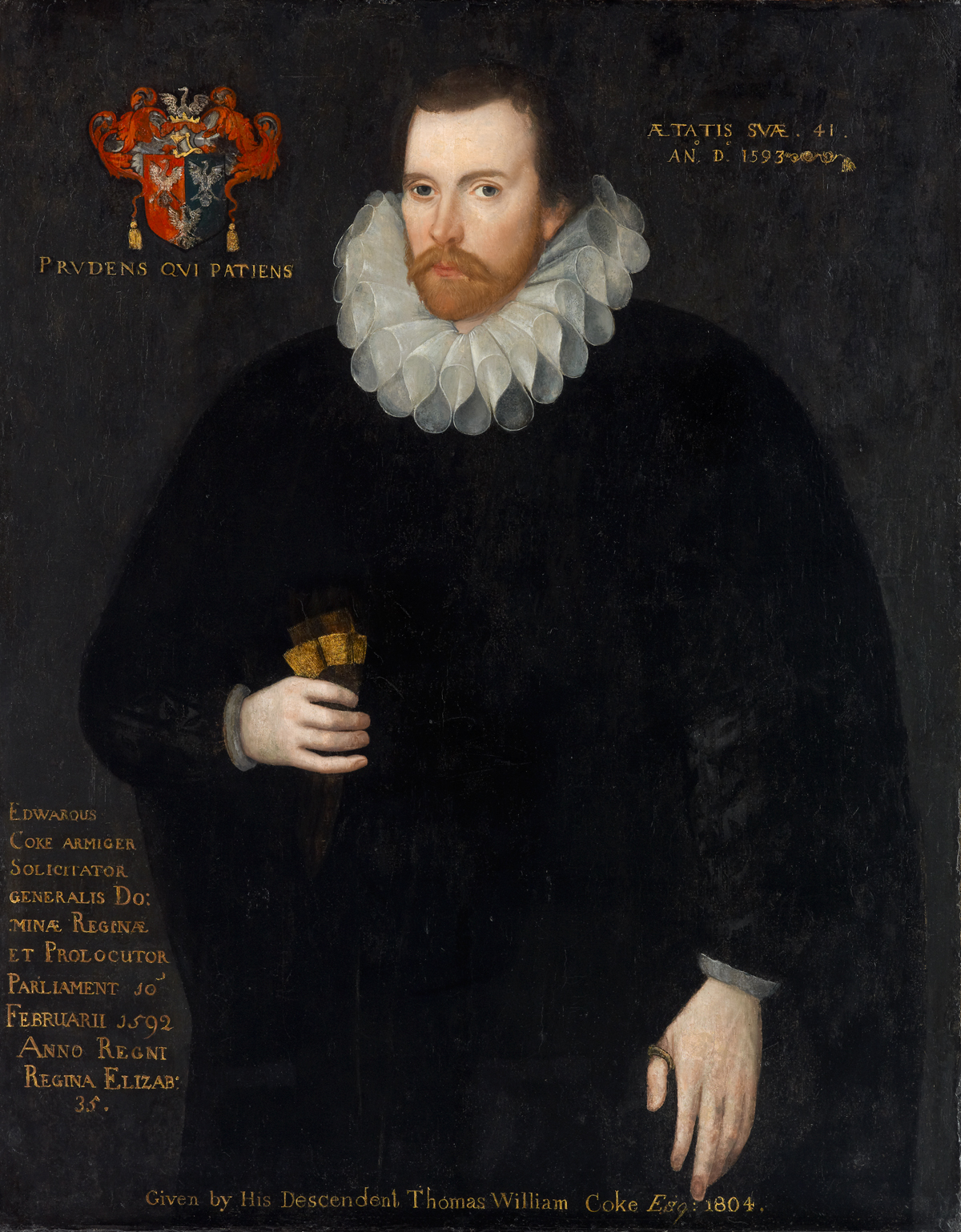
Sir Edward Coke, responsible for the traditional common law definition of murder.

Murder is when a man of sound memory and of the age of discretion unlawfully killeth within any country of the realm any reasonable creature in rerum natura under the King's peace with malice aforethought, either expressed by the party or implied by law, [so as the party wounded, or hurt, etc die of the wound or hurt, etc within a year and a day after the same].

— definition of murder given by Edward Coke

Murder has never been statutorily defined, despite being recognised as either the most serious crime, or certainly among them. The actus reus (prohibited act) of murder, unlawfully causing the death of another person, fits the general provisions for homicide. The mens rea (mental element) of murder was long held to be "malice aforethought", which took on a meaning only of the required mental state for murder, since malice aforethought required neither malice (compassionate killing is still murder) nor aforethought (no premeditation is required). It is this mental component that marks murder out from manslaughter.

The mental element is taken to be either an intention to kill, or an intention to inflict grievous bodily harm. Grievous bodily harm is "really serious" harm. The extension of the intention to inflict grievous bodily harm has been criticised, although it has remained in place despite several legal challenges, and, in the case of R v Hyam (Note: [1975] AC 55) the minority judgments of Lord Diplock and Lord Kilbrandon which would have removed it. The judges there made reference to the abolition under the Homicide Act 1957 of constructive malice (causing death whilst committing a felony or resisting arrest), believing the rule for grievous bodily harm to be a hang-over of the old system. It can now be concluded that only legislative intervention could abolish this form of murder, and, although the Law Commission proposed a change in the law, none has yet been enacted. The current law was judged to be compatible with Article 7 of the European Convention on Human Rights in relation to Northern Ireland. It can also be defended with reference to the actor taking responsibility for his actions, even unforeseen consequences, or merely as an appropriate response in itself. Intent is subjective: that the defendant must surely have intended their actions because a reasonable person would, knowing what the defendant knew, have foreseen death as a result, is insufficient. This seemed to have been allowed as a form of intent in DPP v Smith, (Note: [1961] AC 290) but that case has been considered overturned following legislative changes, and more recent cases leave no room for doubt on this issue.

Core intent would be where the defendant acted either to cause at least grievous bodily harm to the victim, or where the defendant acted to achieve some other aim, where the death caused was a necessary means to that other end. In general, the jury is directed that "intent" is to be taken as meaning what it does in ordinary life, and that the judge should not attempt to define it in other terms. However, following R v Woollin, (Note: [1992] AC 82) it is also possible for a jury to convict if they "feel sure that death or serious injury was a virtual certainty (barring some unforeseen intervention) as a result of the defendant's actions and that the defendant appreciated that such was the case" – known as "oblique intent". Despite appearing to present an alternative to the primary, core sense of intent, courts have generally seen Woollin as allowing the jury to infer core intent from the evidence of virtual certainty. The jury are entitled to convict in these circumstances, and they should not be directed that they, finding virtual certainty, must convict. However, if it is difficult to imagine circumstances where a jury would find virtual certainty but not convict, which would support this complicating factor. The exception for medical care is mentioned as a general principle for homicide.

There is a mandatory life sentence for murder in England and Wales. David Ormerod describes the evidence for abolishing it – instead giving judges discretion to impose a life sentence, or some lesser term – as "overwhelming" since murders and murderers differ greatly, as in any other crime. However, no government has yet, or seems likely to, institute such reform. The former role of the Home Secretary in deciding the minimum time spent in jail was successfully challenged with reference to the ECHR in R v Home Secretary, ex p Anderson, (Note: [2002] UKHL 46) but the mandatory life sentence itself has been judged compatible. The sentencing and release of life prisoners was reformed by the Criminal Justice Act 2003.

== Manslaughter ==
Previously, all deaths which were not murder were classified as "manslaughter" – however, the law now requires that the death fit a particular type of manslaughter. Modern manslaughter does, however, retain a very wide scope.

There are three main forms of manslaughter in English law: voluntary manslaughter, cases which would otherwise amount to murder but for some legally recognised mitigating factor; and involuntary manslaughter which includes cases of gross negligence manslaughter and unlawful act manslaughter.

=== Voluntary manslaughter ===
There are three types of voluntary manslaughter: that resulting from loss of self-control; that resulting from statutorily defined diminished responsibility; and killing in perseverance of a suicide pact.

Loss of control is defined in sections 54 and 55 of the Coroners and Justice Act 2009. Section 56 abolishes the common law defence of provocation, which also dealt only with murder. There is no mandatory life sentence for voluntary manslaughter. The defence operates whether the defendant is a principal or an accomplice. Broadly speaking, the defendant must have actually lost self-control; the trigger for this must be a qualifying trigger; and it must be that a "normal" person might also have lost control in the circumstances. The loss of control need not be sudden, but cannot be in a "considered desired for revenge". The loss of control is a subjective test which asks whether this defendant actually lost control, and if so, whether that loss of control led to their killing. The qualifying trigger may take one of two forms, or be a combination of both: that the killing was attributable to the defendant's fear of serious violence from the victim against the defendant or another identified person; or where the defendant's loss of self-control was attributable to a thing or things done or said (or both) which constituted circumstances of an extremely grave character, and caused the defendant to have a justifiable sense of being seriously wronged. The meaning of the terms "extremely grave character" and "justifiable sense of being seriously wronged" used in the second form is currently unclear. Section 51(1)(c) requires that "a person of [the defendant]'s sex and age, with a normal degree of tolerance and self-restraint and in the circumstances of [the defendant], might have reacted in the same or in a similar way to [the defendant]." These issues are complicated and directing a jury on issues of loss of control is likely to be difficult.

Diminished responsibility occurs where the defendant has an "abnormality of mental functioning" attributable to a recognised medical condition. It must "substantially impair" the defendant's ability to either: under the nature of his or her conduct; form a rational judgment; or exercise self-control. It must provide an explanation for the defendant's actions. There is some sort of causal link required between the defendant's condition and his acts or omissions, a change on the previous law. A.P. Simester and G. R. Sullivan have argued that it is more clearly worded and more schematic provision than the earlier law, although they are worried if the wording of the section is taken to imprison those better suited to psychiatric help outside of prison.

A killing in pursuance of a suicide pact, where the defendant had the "settled intention" of also committing suicide – although not necessarily by the same act – is a partial defence to murder. He or she must intend to fulfil that pact at the time of the killing and may renege on it later. Where the jury is not satisfied that the killing can be attributed to the defendant, a charge of encouraging or assisting suicide may be substituted to a charge of murder or voluntary manslaughter.

=== Involuntary manslaughter ===
Involuntary manslaughter involves the causing of the death of another person without intent to kill or intention to commit grievous bodily harm. Some cases are in form similar to murder cases; whilst, in others, had death not been caused, the defendant would only be liable for an insignificant crime.

==== "Constructive" or "unlawful act" manslaughter ====
"Constructive" or "unlawful act" manslaughter results from the continuation of aspects of the felony murder rule, which was abolished in English law. Under that rule, the perpetrator of any (civil or criminal) illegality were held responsible for manslaughter for any death they caused. It had a huge scope. Constructive manslaughter has been narrowed, but remains broad. It requires a criminal act that causes the death; that that act is inherently criminal; and that that act is dangerous. Civil liability is insufficient for constructive manslaughter to result. It is deemed "constructive" in the sense that a greater crime – manslaughter – is constructed from a lesser.

The typical case will be of a non-fatal offence against the person that causes death. There must be a criminal act, rather than an omission, following R v Lowe. (Note: [1973] QB 702) Although acts and omissions may be equally culpable, the extension to omissions – where there is no need to show intent – would have made illegal a huge class of persons. Cases such as Lowe, which there was parental neglect, can be dealt with by gross negligence manslaughter. Judges have often failed to identify a single unlawful act on which the crime of manslaughter is to be constructed, rather assuming the presence of one in particular circumstances. There is a required mental element (mens rea) for this crime, but it has in some cases not actually been formally established. This mens rea might be very low, such as recklessness. The requirement of an unlawful act also means that no lawful defence must be available to the defendant in respect of the lesser crime.

The act must be inherently criminal – the case in point is that of R v Andrews, where the defendant had killed whilst driving dangerously. It was only the fact that the driving was dangerous that made it a crime, not the driving itself. Accordingly, Andrews removed driving and regulatory offences from the scope of constructive manslaughter. There are separate rules for causing death by dangerous driving and some regulatory offences. Some commentators took Andrews as excluding strict liability and negligence cases out of constructive manslaughter, although contrary to the exact wording in the judgment there; however, a separate case also called R v Andrews convicted the defendant of constructive manslaughter based on a strict liability offence and this alternative proposition cannot be supported. Gross negligence manslaughter exists as a complementary form, and, if a driver was sufficiently negligent, as well he might, he would be liable for it. This provides an additional reason to exclude such cases from constructive manslaughter.

The requirement that the action be dangerous was confirmed in R v Newbury, (Note: [1977] AC 500) which applied the previous reasoning on R v Church: (Note: [1966] 1 QB 59) "the unlawful act must be such that all sober and reasonable people would inevitably recognise it as an act which must subject the other person to at least the risk of some harm resulting therefrom albeit not serious harm". This is an (almost completely) objective test, it disregards whether the defendant in particular foresaw the danger, and requires only that it would create a risk of some harm. The ordinary person knows only what the defendant did, at least in relation to the susceptibility of the victim. R v Ball (Note: [1989] Crim LR 730) did, however, create a class of dangerous – that of the act itself – where the jury knew more than the defendant; in this case, whilst the defendant knew he was loading a blank cartridge, the jury was entitled to ascribe knowledge that it might be a live cartridge to the reasonable man. This has been criticised, and may not have been necessary. The act need not be directed at the victim: the killing of an innocent bystander by mistake could be manslaughter.

This act must be causally linked to the death. In the case of an offence against the person, it is usually obvious; however, rather more controversial cases have founded constructive manslaughter on drug possession crimes involving the subsequent injection of the drug into another.

==== Gross negligence manslaughter ====
Gross negligence manslaughter requires a much greater level of wrongdoing that the civil tort of negligence.

It requires that the defendant owed a duty of care to the victim (it is for the judge to decide on which facts such a duty would be created). These rules are typically those of tort. For example, in R v Pittwood, the defendant was put under a duty to act on account of being contractually obliged to close the gates at a railway crossing. Similar duties include those of a doctor of his patients, an electrician over a householder he has done work for, parents over their children, and, developed more recently, a police officer over persons he arrests. Included, however, are those of a criminal enterprise, which would not attract tortious liability in the civil law. Where the defendant is liable through an omission and not an act, then a legal duty to act – rather than a duty of care – is needed. Andrew Ashworth has criticised the nature of the duty of care requirement as "decision-making at its retrospective worst".

Once a duty of care (or duty to act, as required) has been shown, the jury should then be asked, following Lord Mackay in R v Adamoko: (Note: [1995] 1 AC 171) "having regard to the risk of death involved, [was] the conduct of the defendant... so bad in all the circumstances as to amount to a criminal act or omission". This has two elements: firstly, the breach of the duty of care must relate to the risk of death (confirmed in R v Singh (Note: [1999] Crim LR 582)), and not to any lesser harm. In other words, the breach of the duty of care must cause the victim's death. Secondly the breach of the duty of care must be so egregious as to amount to a crime. For example, on the fact of Adomako itself, the defendant, an anaesthetist, failed to spot a problem with the victim's breathing tube for 11 minutes, something expert evidence suggested a competent anaesthetist would spot within thirty seconds or so. The defendant was convicted. This definition has been opposed as being circular, as defining the crime of manslaughter as gross negligence as being negligence to a criminal degree. The jury may, under this characterisation, be ruling upon a point of law and not a point of fact.

== Bibliography ==
- Ashworth, Andrew (2006). Principles of Criminal Law. Oxford: Clarendon Press. ISBN 978-0-19-876144-0.
- Baker, Dennis (2021). Glanville Williams & Dennis Baker Treatise of Criminal law (5th ed.). London: LexisNexis. ISBN 9781474320184.
- Simester, A. P.; Sullivan, G. R.; Spencer, J. R.; Virgo, G. (2010). Simester and Sullivan's Criminal Law: Theory and Doctrine (4 ed.). Oxford: Hart Publishing. ISBN 978-1-84113-922-7.
