= Battery (tort) =

Tort of contact

In common law, battery is a tort falling under the umbrella term 'trespass to the person'. Entailing unlawful contact which is directed and intentional, or reckless (or, in Australia, negligently) and voluntarily bringing about a harmful or offensive contact with a person or to something closely associated with them, such as a bag or purse, without legal consent.

Unlike assault, in which the fear of imminent contact may support a civil claim, battery involves an actual contact. The contact can be by one person (the tortfeasor) of another (the victim), with or without a weapon, or the contact may be by an object brought about by the tortfeasor. For example, the intentional driving of a car into contact with another person, or the intentional striking of a person with a thrown rock, is a battery.

Unlike criminal law, which recognizes degrees of various crimes involving physical contact, there is but a single tort of battery. Lightly flicking a person's ear is battery, as is severely beating someone with a tire iron. Neither is there a separate tort for a battery of a sexual nature. However, a jury hearing a battery case is free to assess higher damages for a battery in which the contact was particularly offensive or harmful.

Since it is practically impossible to avoid physical contact with others during everyday activities, everyone is presumed to consent to a certain amount of physical contact with others, such as when one person unavoidably brushes or bumps against another in a crowded lift, passage or stairway. However, physical contact may not be deemed consented to if the acts that cause harm are prohibited acts.

== Elements ==
=== Contact ===
Battery is a form of trespass to the person and as such no actual damage (e.g. injury) needs to be proved. Only proof of contact (with the appropriate level of intention or negligence) needs to be made. An attempt to commit a battery, but without making actual contact, may constitute a tort of assault. The tort of battery developed out of a general judicial respect of an individual's autonomy and right not to be interfered with.

Battery need not require body-to-body contact. Touching an object "intimately connected", to a person (such as an object they are holding) can also be battery. Furthermore, a contact may constitute a battery even if there is a delay between the defendant's act and the contact to the plaintiff's injury. For example, where a person who digs a pit with the intent that another will fall into it later, or where a person who mixes something offensive in food that they know another will eat, has committed a battery against that other when the other does in fact fall into the pit or eats the offensive matter.

=== Intent ===
The character of intent in civil battery is different from that for criminal battery. The character of intent sufficient for battery also varies between common law countries, and often within differing jurisdictions of those countries. In Australia, negligence in an action is sufficient to establish intent. In the United States, intention to do an act that ultimately results in contact that is either harmful or offensive is sufficient for the tort of battery, while intention to inflict an injury on another is required for criminal battery. In the U.S., courts are split on how to test for sufficient intent. Some courts use the single intent rule which seeks to determine whether or not the defendant intended to touch the plaintiff, while some courts use the dual intent rule which seeks to determine whether or not the defendant sought to harm or offend by touching.

Additionally, courts also follow the transferred intent doctrine in battery claims. For instance, if a person swings to hit one person and instead misses and hits another, they can still be held liable for a battery. Intent to commit a different tort can transfer in the same way. If a person throws a rock towards one person intending only to scare them (but not to hit them), they will be liable for battery to a different person who is hit by that rock. In the United States, critics of this doctrine believe that the tort of negligence has superseded the need for transferred intent. One issue is that the statute of limitations can be shorter for intentional torts such as battery than the statutes of limitations for negligent torts.

=== Awareness ===
The victim of a battery need not be aware of the act at the time for the tort to have occurred. For example, if a surgeon performing an appendectomy on an unconscious patient decides to take out the patient's spleen for his personal collection, the surgeon has committed a battery against the patient. Similarly, a battery occurs if the surgeon allows a cousin who is a plumber with no medical training to help fish out the appendix during the surgery. Although the patient has consented to being touched by the surgeon, this consent does not extend to people who the patient would not reasonably anticipate would be participating in the procedure.

The battery may occur even if the victim is unaware of the contact at the time and the defendant is nowhere near the scene at the time of the contact. If a tortfeasor puts an offensive substance in another person's food, and the other person consumes the offensive substance, the battery has been committed even if the victim is not made aware that they have eaten something offensive until much later.

== Defenses ==
The standard defenses to trespass to the person, namely necessity, consent, self-defense, and defense of others, apply to battery. As practical examples, under the defense of necessity, a physician may touch a person without that person's consent in order to render medical aid to them in an emergency.

=== Consent ===
Under the defence of consent, a person who has, either expressly or impliedly, consented to participation in a contact sport cannot claim in battery against other participants for a contact permitted by the rules of that sport, or expected to occur within the course of play. For example, a basketball player who commits a hard foul against an opposing player does not thereby commit a battery, because fouls are a regular part of the course of the game, even though they result in a penalty. However, a player who struck another player during a time-out would be liable for battery, because there is no game-related reason for such a contact to occur. I.e. in Condon v Basi you can consent in a sports context to a risk of harm but this does not extend to unreasonable contact, the contact must be reasonable.

==== Medical consent ====
Moreover, you can also consent to medical treatment:

'All common law persons have the right not to suffer bodily violation without their consent', as seen in F v West Berkshire. It is therefore, 'essential that clinicians involved in either treating or advising patients consider the issue of consent.' It is the consent of the patient which prevents the doctor who performs surgery from otherwise being liable in the tort of battery, the courts will only recognise true consent when the patient has been informed in broad terms about the nature of the procedure (as demonstrated in Chatterson v Gerson).

A doctor is under a duty to take reasonable care to ensure that a patient is aware of risks to which they are likely to attach significance. Whilst a doctor can withhold information if they consider it detrimental to the patient's health, this exception does not entitle a doctor to withhold information just because the patient may make a decision the doctor disapproves of. As demonstrated in the case of Montgomery v Lanarkshire Health Board.

Statute provides that children aged 16 and over can consent to medical treatment, provided they have sufficient maturity and intelligence to understand the nature and implications of the proposed treatment. Therefore, any action taken has been consented to and would not constitute a tort of battery. Parent consent may also suffice.

==== Incapacity ====
Some people cannot consent:

Following the statute of the Mental Capacity Act 2005 s. 5:

- Following s. 1. 3 A person is not to be treated as unable to make a decision unless all practical steps to help them to do so have been taken without success.
- Following s. 1. 4 A person must not be treated as unable to make a decision just because they make an unwise decision.

Mental Capacity Act 2005

Section 2 People who lack capacity

(1) For the purposes of this Act, a person lacks capacity in relation to a matter if at the material time they are unable to make a decision for themself in relation to the matter because of an impairment of, or a disturbance in the functioning of, the mind or brain.

(2) It does not matter whether the impairment or disturbance is permanent or temporary.

(3) A lack of capacity cannot be established merely by reference to-

(a) a person's age or appearance, or

(b) a condition of his, or an aspect of his behaviour, which might lead others to make unjustified assumptions about his capacity

(4) In proceedings under this Act or any other enactment, any question whether a person lacks capacity within the meaning of this Act must be decided on the balance of probabilities.

This provides that care or treatment can go ahead after all, if it is in the best interest of the patient. However, when medical treatment is no longer in the best interests of the patient, then no medical care is allowed and must be withdrawn (Airedale Trust v Bland). Also, if a patient, who is mentally competent, refuses to consent, that is the end of the matter and the treatment cannot proceed as doing so would be a battery. Even if it puts at risk the life of the patient's unborn child (St George's Healthcare NHS Trust v S). And even if it risks the patient's own death (Re B [2002]).

=== Self-defence ===
Self-defence as to battery can occur when a person reasonably believes that they are going to be attacked by another person, and involves engaging in a reasonable level of physical contact with that person in order to prevent that person from engaging in a physical attack. This requires an honest and reasonable belief that you are about to be attacked:

Lord Scott noted at paragraph [18] of Ashley v Chief Constable of West Sussex Police that 'it is one thing to say that if A's mistaken belief was honestly held that they should not be punished by the criminal law, it would be quite another to say that A's unreasonably held mistaken belief would be subjected to physical violence by A'.

The requirements for self-defence are different from those in criminal law; in civil law, the belief of imminent danger need not be reasonably held, and may allow a pre-emptive attack.

== Damages ==
See main article: Damages

The most commonly awarded damages for the tort of battery is compensatory damages, whereby you put the claimant in the position they would have been in had the incident not occurred. This damage only occurs where the claimant has 'suffered injury of some sort', from being battered.

However rarer remedies such as an injunction may be awarded if the conduct is repetitive, to prevent the behaviour repeating again. Aggravated damages are also available but only ''when the trespass to the person constitutes an affront to the claimants dignity, causing them humiliation or injury to feelings.' For example, in the case of Appleton v Garrett, where a dentist performed unnecessary dental treatment on patients and because of the deception of the patients the consent did not count.

Where the court still recognises that a tort has taken place, but there is no damage, the court may award the claimant nominal damages. This is a 'token sum of money which, along with the court's judgement, records the vindication of the claimant's rights.'

== Worldwide ==
=== England and Wales ===
Following UK Tort law the tort of battery is where the defendant intentionally, or recklessly, and unlawfully makes direct contact with the claimant. An outcome is intentional when a defendant seeks that outcome on purpose and when the outcome was virtually certain to be the consequence of acting. Likewise, a person is reckless when they foresaw a risk, but took it anyway, even if to do so was unreasonable in the circumstances known to them (As established in R v G). This was also made clear in the case of Iqbal v Police Officer's Association, where it was held that for trespass to the person, intention or subjective recklessness is required. Essentially, 'a battery is the intentional application of unlawful force to another person', 'typically A stabs B; X shoots Y; Henry punches Thomas. The essence of the wrong is the 'invasion of the physical person of the [claimant]'

This tort is actionable per se, which means no harm is needed to be proven for the tortfeasor to be held liable. The key case of Collins v Wilcock clarified the law in this area, establishing: "The fundamental principle, plain and incontestable, is that every person's body is inviolate". Essentially you have the right not to be touched or interfered with in any way. Your body is yours, and yours only, any contact is potentially unlawful: there is no minimum level of violence condoned by the law. However, some contact is unavoidable and this form of contact is categorised as 'exigencies of everyday life', I.e. when you walk down a corridor and bump into someone, this is not a battery (tort): 'Horseplay among children at school might similarly be lawful'. Contact is lawful when the other person consents.

==== History ====
This tort has changed significantly from how it used to be. In past case-law such as Cole v Turner [1704], 'the least touching of another in anger' was what constituted a battery. Therefore, some form of anger used to be required, following cases such as this.

Moreover, in the case of Wilson v Pringle [1987] the court said that contact to be tortious must be 'hostile', therefore mere horseplay might not constitute battery.

However, these requirements were not helpful, as they would mean that an unwanted kiss is not a battery due to a lack of anger or hostility. Thus, thankfully these requirements were changed to follow Collins v Wilcock

==== Proof of contact ====
There must be a form of contact. A push or a shove is clearly direct contact, some part of their body has touched your own, however, the courts have also interpreted situations that go far beyond this as 'directness'.

For example, in the case of Scott v Shepherd where someone threw a lighted squib and it was picked up and thrown at someone by another thrower than the original, it was still held as 'direct contact' from the original thrower, through the chain of causation.

Moreover, direct contact has been established where: a defendant struck the claimant's horse, so the horse bolted, throwing the claimant to the ground and when a defendant overturned a chair upon which the claimant was sitting. Thus, 'direct contact' can extend to direct through another source according to certain UK court interpretation. Finally, Intent can be transferred and 'transferred malice' is recognised too within tort law, I.e. in Bici v ministry of Defence.

=== United States ===
In the United States, the common law requires the contact for battery be "harmful or offensive." The offensiveness is measured against a reasonable person standard. Looking at a contact objectively, as a reasonable person would see it, would this contact be offensive? Thus, a hypersensitive person would fail on a battery action if jostled by fellow passengers on a subway, as this contact is expected in normal society and a reasonable person would not find it offensive. Harmful is defined by any physical damage to the body.

Because courts have recognized a cause of action for battery in the absence of body-to-body contact, the outer limits of the tort can often be hard to define. The Pennsylvania Superior Court attempted to provide some guidance in this regard in the Herr v. Booten case by stressing the importance of the concept of one's personal dignity. In that case, college students purchased and provided their friend with alcohol on the eve of his twenty-first birthday. After drinking nearly an entire bottle of Jack Daniels whiskey, the underage man died of acute ethanol poisoning. Reversing the decision of the trial court, the Pennsylvania Superior Court held that supplying a minor with alcoholic beverages, while certainly constituting a negligent act, did not rise to the level of a battery. In the words of Judge Montemuro, supplying a person with alcohol "is not an act which impinges upon that individual's sense of physical dignity or inviolability."

== See also ==
- Battery (crime)
- Assault
- Assault (tort)
- Trespass in English law
- Canadian tort law
