= Bodily harm =

Legal term

Bodily harm is a legal term of art used in the definition of both statutory and common law offences in Australia, Canada, England and Wales and other common law jurisdictions. It is a synonym for injury or bodily injury and similar expressions, though it may be used with a precise and limited meaning in any given jurisdiction. The expression grievous bodily harm first appeared in a statute in Lord Ellenborough's Act (1803).

== Canada ==
In the Canadian Criminal Code, "bodily harm" is defined as "any hurt or injury to a person that interferes with the health or comfort of the person and that is more than merely transient or trifling in nature."

== England and Wales ==
The expression is not defined by any statute. It currently appears in a number of offences under the Offences against the Person Act 1861 (ss. 18, 20, 23, 26, 28, 29, 31, 35, and 47) and in the offence of burglary under the Theft Act 1968 (s. 9). It is also used in the definition of murder (as it appears in case law) in the guise of grievous bodily harm.

Psychiatric disorder

Non-physical or psychiatric injury can be considered "bodily harm" whether "actual" or "grievous", but there must be formal medical evidence to verify the injury.

In R v Ireland, R v Burstow, Lord Steyn said:

The proposition that the Victorian legislator when enacting sections 18, 20 and 47 of the Act 1861, would not have had in mind psychiatric illness is no doubt correct. Psychiatry was in its infancy in 1861.

In modern times, the practice of statutory interpretation frequently refers to the actual intention of the draftsman as expressed in the words of the Act, but considered in the light of contemporary knowledge. R v. Chan Fook applied this approach. Hobhouse LJ. said the prosecution "chose to introduce into the case an allegation that even if Mr Martins had suffered no physical injury at all as a result of the assault upon him by the Appellant, he had nevertheless been reduced to a mental state which in itself, without more, amounted to actual bodily harm. The only evidence to which the prosecution could point in support of this allegation was the evidence of Mr Martins that he felt abused and humiliated, that he had been threatened with further violence, and that he was very frightened. There was no medical or psychiatric evidence to support the allegation. There was no evidence that he was in a state of shock at any time prior to receiving the injuries which he suffered as a result of falling from the window."

Hobhouse LJ. said:

The first question on the present appeal is whether the inclusion of the word "bodily" is the phrase "actual bodily harm" limits harm to harm to the skin, flesh and bones of the victim. Mr Justice Lynskey rejected this submission. In our judgment he was right to do so. The body of the victim includes all parts of his body, including his organs, his nervous system and his brain. Bodily injury therefore may include injury to any of those parts of his body responsible for his mental and other faculties.

He went on to say:

Accordingly the phrase "actual bodily harm" is capable of include psychiatric injury. But it does not include mere emotions such as fear or distress nor panic nor does it include, as such, states of mind that are not themselves evidence of some identifiable clinical condition.

He said that juries "should not be directed that an assault which causes a hysterical and nervous condition is an assault occasioning actual bodily harm".

This was followed by the Court of Appeal in R v Constanza, and the House of Lords which confirmed the principle in R v Burstow, R v Ireland. Ireland caused three women to develop psychiatric illnesses. Burstow's victim was fearful of personal violence and was diagnosed with a severe depressive illness. The best medical practice today accepts a link between the body and psychiatric injury, so the words "bodily harm" in sections 20 and 47 were capable of covering recognised psychiatric illnesses, such as an anxiety disorders or a depressive disorder, which affect the central nervous system of the body. However, to qualify, those neuroses must be more than simple states of fear, or problems in coping with everyday life, which do not amount to psychiatric illnesses.

Venereal and other communicable disease

See R v. Dica [2004] EWCA Crim 1103

The Law Commission stated its view that "the deliberate or reckless causing of disease should not be beyond the reach of the criminal law" and there is continuing debate over whether the transmission of HIV is covered as grievous bodily harm or under sections 22 to 24 of the Offences against the Person Act 1861.

In R v Clarence, it appeared that at a time when the prisoner knew, but his wife did not know, that he had gonorrhoea, he had "connection" with her; that the result was that the disease was communicated to her, and that had she been aware of the prisoner's condition she would not have submitted to the intercourse.

Lord Coleridge CJ., Pollock and Huddleston BB., Stephen, Manisty, Mathew, A L Smith, Wills and Grantham JJ., held that the conduct of the prisoner did not amount to an offence under either section 20 or section 47. Field, Hawkins, Day and Charles JJ. dissented.

Wills J. said "the facts are ... that he infected her, and that from such infection she suffered grievous bodily harm".

Hawkins J. said:

In this condition of things the prisoner had sexual intercourse with his wife and in doing so communicated to her his disease and thereby caused her grievous bodily harm.

Field J. said (a footnote has been included in the body of the text, indicated by "(1)"):

It is, I think, also clear that if the condition of the man is such that it is an ordinary and natural consequence of the contact to communicate an infectious disease to the woman, and he does so, he does in fact inflict upon her both "actual" and "grievous bodily harm." Such an act produces what a great authority, Lord Stowell, describes as "an injury of a most malignant kind:" see the note to Durant v. Durant. (1) 1 Hagg. Eccl. Cases, 768.

Unconsciousness

See T v. DPP [2003] EWHC 266 (Admin), [2003] Crim LR 622.

Hair

See DPP v. Smith [2006] EWHC 94 (Admin)

Pain or hurt such as persisting headaches, vomiting, pains in joints, stomach aches not caused by physical trauma

Mentioned in R v. Morris (Clarence Barrington) [1998] Cr App R 386

Great pain followed by tenderness and soreness for some time afterwards

This may constitute actual bodily harm, even though there is no physically discernible injury. See Reigate Justices ex p. Counsell (1984) 148 JP 193, DC
