= Collins v Wilcock =

1984 court case in UK

- Court: High Court of Justice
- Decided: 16 April 1984
- Citation: [1984] 1 WLR 1172; [1984] 3 All ER 374; (1984) 148 JP 692; (1984) 79 Cr App R 229; (1984) 128 Sol Jo 660; (1984) 81 LS Gaz 2140; [1984] Crim LR 481

Case history
- Appealed from: Marylebone Magistrates' Court

Court membership
- Judges sitting: Goff LJ and Mann J

Collins v Wilcock is an appellate case decided in 1984 by a divisional court of the Queen's Bench Division of the High Court of England and Wales. It is concerned with trespass to the person focusing on battery.

Collins v Wilcock is a leading case. Expanding on Sir John Holt's definition of intent in Cole v Turner, Lord Goff's ruling in Collins v Wilcock narrowed the law. "An assault is committed when a person intentionally or recklessly harms someone indirectly. A battery is committed when a person intentionally and recklessly harms someone directly." But it also says this: "An offence of Common Assault is committed when a person either assaults another person or commits a battery." It notes that the only distinction between common assault and causing actual bodily harm (under section 47 of the Offences Against the Person Act 1861) is the degree of injury.
