= Concurrence =

Simultaneity of actus reus and mens rea

In Western jurisprudence, concurrence (also contemporaneity or simultaneity) is the apparent need to prove the simultaneous occurrence of both actus reus ("guilty action") and mens rea ("guilty mind"), to constitute a crime; except in crimes of strict liability. In theory, if the actus reus does not hold concurrence in point of time with the mens rea then no crime has been committed.

== Discussion ==
Suppose for example that the accused accidentally injures a pedestrian while driving. Aware of the collision, the accused rushes from the car only to find that the victim is a hated enemy. At this point, the accused joyfully proclaims his pleasure at having caused the injury. The conventional rule is that no crime has been committed. The actus reus is complete, and no rule of ratification applies in the criminal law. Whereas in the law of agency, a principal may retrospectively adopt a transaction as if the agent had originally been authorised to conclude an agreement with a third party ("ratification" of the agent's decision), and so acquires liability under that agreement, an alleged criminal cannot retrospectively adopt an actus reus and acquire guilt. To be convicted, the accused must have formed the mens rea either before or during the commission of the actus reus. In the vast majority of cases, this rule works without difficulty.

Two types of concurrence in criminal law

1. Temporal concurrence – the actus reus and mens rea occur at the same time.
2. Motivational concurrence – the mens rea motivates the actus reus.

== The problem ==
Not all events are limited to a particular moment in time. The normal physical rules of cause and effect may see a series of interlocking circumstances conspire to cause a particular injury. If the facts of the example above are slightly changed so that the accident occurs at night at a sharp bend on a very quiet country road; when the driver sees the victim lying in the road he simply leaves the unconscious person where he fell. Some hours later, when a second car innocently comes around the corner and kills the victim, the first driver is happily asleep in his bed. Thus, he argues that, at the time of the death, he had no mens rea and so cannot be guilty of homicide. This argument fails because of the so-called Single Transaction Principle.

== Single transaction principle ==
Not all acts forming the basis of an actus reus are single, unconnected events. If a sequence of events is inevitably linked, it may be viewed as a single transaction. So long as the requisite mens rea is formed before the sequence begins, or during the sequence (before it ends), the accused will be liable.

In the previous example, the victim would not have died if the first driver had not abandoned him at a dangerous point on the road. The law will treat the actus reus as having started with the accidental injury and ended with the death. In Fagan v Metropolitan Police Commissioner (1969) 1 QB 439, a police officer ordered the defendant to park his car and he reluctantly complied. In doing so, he accidentally drove the car on to the policeman's foot and, when the policeman said "Get off my foot", said "Fuck you, you can wait" and turned off the ignition. Because of the steel toe cap in his boot, the policeman's foot was not in actual danger, but the Divisional Court held that this could constitute a common assault. Albeit accidentally, the driver had caused the car to rest on the foot. This actus reus was a continuing state of affairs for so long as the car rested on the officer's foot and the mens rea was formed before the car was removed. Whether realistically or not, the officer apprehended the possibility of injury so the offence of common assault was complete.

A different way of justifying liability in this type of situation would be to consider an omission at the point in time that the mens rea is formed. In the first example, liability arises from the reckless omission to move the man, or willful blindness that he was in danger. In Fagan, liability arises from omitting to remove the car.

But not every factual sequence can be so conveniently recast as an omission. Suppose, for example, that A sees his enemy, B, and decides to attack him. A picks up a stick and begins to chase B who runs into a hotel, up the stairs and into a room, locking the door behind him. A hammers at the door, shouting threats. A then sees a fire axe in a glass case nearby. He tells B that he is going for the axe and will break down the door. When A walks away, B is so terrified that he jumps out of the window and breaks his legs. Even though A might not have had an immediate intention to injure B at the critical moment when B jumped, the fear was inspired with an appropriate intention and B would not have been desperate enough to jump had it not been for that fear. [It is fair to exclude liability when B's fear is entirely unreasonable given A's behaviour because B's self-induced injury will break the chain of causation].

This latter example raises a separate issue which is that it is sufficient to base a conviction on the presence of mens rea at some time during the occurrence of the events comprising the single transaction. The fact that the accused might mistakenly believe they have succeeded in the crime does not prevent a conviction. For example, suppose that A begins to strangle B and, believing B to be dead, abandons the "body" in nearby woods where B dies of exposure. A will still be convicted of the homicide even though the relevant behaviour of abandoning the body was not accompanied by a mens rea.

And for the sake of completeness, if A commits an offence with an actus reus and a mens rea, it will not affect liability that A subsequently repents the crime and effects restitution. Thus, if A steals goods from B but then returns them together with some money to make good the damage caused during the forced entry, this cannot change the fact that there was an actus reus accompanied by an appropriate mens rea. A crime was committed although the subsequent conscience-based behaviour would be a relevant consideration during the sentencing stage of the trial.

== English case law examples ==
- Thabo Meli v R (1954) 1 All ER 373 (PC) Four defendants intended to kill their victim so they induced him to consume alcohol, struck him on the head and threw the "body" over a cliff to make the death appear accidental. Because they thought that the blow had killed him, there was no mens rea when they abandoned him and he died from exposure. The first act did not cause death but had the appropriate mens rea. The second act caused death but had no mens rea. But the Privy Council held that it was impossible to divide up what was really one transaction. The actus reus was said to be the series of acts and omissions with mens rea covering the initial stages.
- In R v Church (1965) 2 AER 72 during an argument, the defendant struck the victim and, mistakenly believing her to be dead, threw her into a nearby river where she drowned. He was convicted of manslaughter.
- In R v LeBrun (1991) 4 All ER 673, the defendant struck his wife during an argument outside their house leaving her unconscious. He then tried to drag her inside but, as he did so, her head struck the pavement, fracturing her skull and killing her. At first sight, this is distinguishable from R v Church because death was accidental, whereas Church was intentionally disposing of the "body". But, in attempting to drag his unconscious wife indoors, LeBrun was either trying to conceal his initial assault on her, or forcing her to enter the house against her wishes (this being the original reason for the argument). The trial judge had directed the jury to acquit if they concluded that LeBrun had been trying to help his wife when he moved her, and the Court of Appeal agreed that this would have broken the essential nexus between the two halves of the incident.
- In AG's Reference (No. 4 of 1980) (1981) 2 All ER 617 the defendant was struggling with his girlfriend and she fell over a landing rail on to the floor below. Believing her dead, he dismembered her in the bath to dispose of her "body". It was impossible to prove whether she had died in the original fall or whether he killed her by his subsequent actions. The Court of Appeal held that a manslaughter conviction was only possible if each of the defendant's acts was accompanied by the requisite mens rea for that offence. At the very least, there must be an unlawful act which was the cause of the ultimate death. It was not enough to establish criminal negligence only in the subsequent act of disposal. Hence, the prosecution had to disprove D's claim of accident, i.e. that he had merely pushed her away in a "reflex action" when she dug her nails into him in the struggle on the upstairs landing.
- Fagan v. Metropolitan Police Commissioner [1968] 3 All ER 442 The defendant accidentally drove his car onto a policeman's foot whilst the policeman was directing traffic, but then subsequently refused to move off during an argument with the policeman. It was held that the actus reus was not the single act of driving onto the foot, but continued as long as the car remained there. Once the defendant subsequently acquired the mens rea to harm the policeman, the crime was complete.
