= Tuberville v Savage =

English case on the requirements of assault and common assault

- Court: Court of King's Bench (England)
- Citations: [1669] EWHC KB J25; (1669) 1 Mod Rep 3; (1669) 86 ER 684

Keywords
- Assault; Common assault; Intent; Apprehension; Conditional threatening statement

Tuberville v Savage (1669) 1 Mod Rep 3; 86 ER 684 is an English decision about the requirements for both the tort of assault and the common law criminal offence of common assault. It involved plaintiff Tuberville versus defendant Savage. The court held that a conditional threatening statement, without an imminent threat of harm, does not constitute an assault.

== Facts ==
Savage had made some insulting comments to Tuberville. In response, Tuberville grabbed the handle of his sword and stated, "If it were not assize-time, I would not take such language from you." Savage responded with force, causing Tuberville to lose his eye. Tuberville brought an action for assault, battery, and wounding, to which Savage pleaded provocation, to-wit Tuberville's statement.

== Judgment ==
The Court considered the language used in the statement and found that Tuberville did not express any intention to do any harm to Savage in the given circumstances. Tuberville's expressed words indicated that he was not going to harm Savage because the justices of assize were in town, and his laying his hand on his sword was to be interpreted in conjunction with those words, namely as an indication or description of what he would have done were the judges not nearby. Therefore, Tuberville's conduct was insufficient to put a reasonable person in Savage's situation in apprehension of immediate violence, as it involved neither a subjective intent to do so nor an act reasonably construable as doing so, at least one of which would have been required for Tuberville's action to constitute an assault. As such, Tuberville's conduct constituted neither an attack that would have justified Savage in defending himself nor even provocation sufficient to mitigate Savage's culpability for his response. Thus, Savage's defence was unsuccessful, and Tuberville prevailed in his action.

== See also ==
- English tort law
- Battery
- Assault
- Self-defence
