= Silent Descent =

English heavy metal band

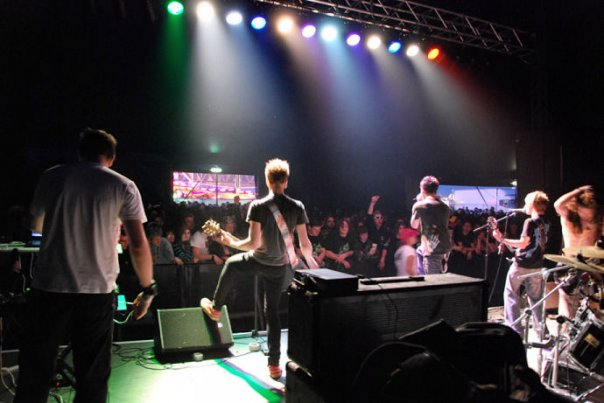
- Silent Descent live at the Download Festival 2009

Background information
- Origin: Dartford, Kent, England
- Genres: Melodic death metal; trancecore; alternative metal
- Years active: 2004–present
- Labels: Rising; Victor (JVC)
- Members: Tom Watling; Tom Callahan; Paul Hurrell; Jimmy Huang; Kodi Bramble
- Past members: Rich Lawry-Johns; Spencer Haynes; Nik King; Kai Giritli; Mr. G Chris "Kipster" Ayling; Jak "Sniffles" Coleman; Elliot Philpot; Dave Carter; Jerry Sadowski; Jack "Jaco" Oxley
- Website: silentdescent.com

Silent Descent is an English heavy metal band from Dartford, founded in 2004. They mix melodic death metal with melodic trance elements using turntables as well as predominant keyboards.

== History ==
Silent Descent released their first EP in 2005, which differed from the band's current sound. In 2007, the band entered the TotalRock Radio global unsigned band awards, winning the "Symphonic Rock or Metal" category, and selected by judges to receive the "Supreme Silver" award (fourth overall in the contest). The following year, the band won the Kerrang!/MCN Unsigned Live competition .

On 12 March 2008, the band released their debut album Duplicity. The band performed at the Bloodstock Open Air music festival on 17 August 2008 and headlined the Boardie Takeover at Download festival in 2009 and 2010.

In addition to working on their next album, the band released a remix EP for Duplicity in 2010.

The second album Mind Games was officially released in the UK on 7 May 2012 and in Japan on 23 May 2012 featuring two bonus tracks Call Me When You Get There and Wipe Your Chin and Walk Away. The album was tracked at Legacy London, featuring guest vocals from Sarah Jezebel Deva, and mixed by Pontus Hjelm (Dead by April) with tracks 1 and 8 mixed by hard trance producer Alf Bamford (Technikal).

Silent Descent played on the Pepsi Max stage at the Download Festival on 8 June 2012.

In 2012 their long-term musician Chris Kipster left the band, they played with him at a farewell show at Leo's Red Lion in Gravesend, Kent. However, the band released the remix album Remind Games in 2014, which was produced by Chris Kipster.

In 2017, the band released their third official album Turn To Grey, which featuring a guest appearance by Björn 'Speed' Strid of Soilwork.

== Band members ==
=== Current ===
- Tom Watling – unclean vocals (2005–present), clean vocals (2005–2010, 2026–present)
- Tom Callahan – lead guitar (2026–present), rhythm guitar (2005, 2008–present), backing vocals, clean vocals (2005–present), bass (2005–2008)
- Paul Hurrell – keyboards, synthesizers, backing vocals, clean vocals (2008–present)
- Jimmy Huang – bass (2010–present), clean vocals (2026–present)
- Kodi Bramble – drums (2014–present)

=== Former ===
- Rich Lawry-Johns – rhythm guitar (2005–2008)
- Spencer Haynes – keyboards (2006–2008)
- Nik King – lead guitar (2005–2006)
- Kai Giritli – lead guitar (2006–2008)
- Mr. G – DJ, samples, programming (2008–2009)
- Chris "Kipster" Ayling – DJ, samples, programming (2009–2012)
- Jak "Sniffles" Coleman – bass (2008–2009)
- Elliot Philpot – drums (2005–2008)
- Dave Carter – drums (2008–2010)
- Jerry Sadowski – drums (2010–2014)
- Jack "Jaco" Oxley – lead guitar, backing vocals, clean vocals (2008–2026)

== Discography ==
=== Albums ===
- Duplicity (2008)
- Mind Games (2012)
- Remind Games (2014)
- Turn to Grey (2017)

=== EPs ===
- Silent Descent (2005)
- Duplicity Remix EP (2010)

=== Music videos ===
- Duplicity (2008)
- Psychotic Euphoric (2012)
- Breaking The Space (2013)
- Vortex (2017)
