= Duplicity (law) =

Legal term

In common law jurisdictions, duplicity is the error committed when the charge (known as a count) on an indictment describes more than one offence.

An indictment may contain more than one count, but each count must allege only one offence, so that the defendant (and the jury) can know precisely what offenses he or she is accused of. If a count is poorly drafted so that it alleges two offences, it is said to be "duplicitous". A duplicitous count is defective and may be quashed by the judge, unless the judge permits the count to be amended so that it only alleges one offence, or is split into two counts. If a duplicitous count is not noticed until after the defendant has been convicted on it, the verdict may be void.

Duplicity is not to be mistaken with multiplicity, which is similar to duplicity in law. While duplicity refers to multiple offences under the same count, multiplicity regards multiple counts that reflect the same offence.

== Examples ==
In People v. Bauman (2008), Amber Bauman was facing two counts of assault according to 10 different offences that she committed. The 2 counts were dismissed by the New York Supreme court on the basis that each count related to more than one offence, which is duplicitous.The Appellate Court upheld this decision with the reasoning that each count of the indictment must relate to only one offence.

In United States v. Shorter (1985), the defendant was indicted with one count of felony tax evasion and 6 more counts of misdemeanour tax-related offenses. The defendant argued that his indictment included 12 separate offenses, which meant that the felony count was duplicitous and carried more than one offense compared to one count. The motion to dismiss the felony count was denied on the basis that each offense was related and all the offences fell under the one count.
