= Fagan v Metropolitan Police Commissioner =

English criminal law case

- Court: Divisional court (England and Wales)
- Full case name: Regina v. (usually spoken as The Crown and or against) Vincent Martel Fagan
- Decided: 31 July 1968
- Citation: [1969] 1 QB 439, [1968] 3 All ER 442, [1968] 3 WLR 1120, 52 Cr App R 700

Case history
- Prior action: Conviction by Willesden magistrates in 1967, upheld in Middlesex Quarter Sessions

Court membership
- Judges sitting: Lord Parker C.J., James J, Bridge J

Case opinions
- Per curiam (unanimously): Mens rea and actus rea must coincide in time to establish guilt in most offences, including all forms of assault, battery and offences against the person, however realisation that a battery is ongoing will render the omission to act to remove that battery being inflicted a conscious battery, being sufficient concurrence.

Keywords
- causation; concurrence; deliberate omission to act to cease harm being inadvertently inflicted at outset

Fagan v Metropolitan Police Commissioner (1968) is a leading case that confirms the need for concurrence (or coincidence) of actus reus (Latin for "guilty act") and mens rea (Latin for "guilty mind") in most offences of the criminal law of England and Wales. It also advises realisation that a battery is ongoing will render the omission to act to remove that battery being inflicted a conscious battery, being sufficient concurrence.

== Facts ==
The defendant, Mr. Fagan, was in his car when a police officer approached him and told him to move his car. In accordance with the directions, Fagan backed his car up, accidentally rolling it onto the foot of the officer. When the officer yelled at him to move his car off his foot, he replied, "Fuck you, you can wait", and refused to move, which was an act of defiance.

At trial, Fagan was convicted of "assaulting a constable in execution of his duties". Fagan appealed on the grounds that there can be no offence in omitting to act and that the act of driving onto the constable's foot was done completely by accident so there was no mens rea.

== Judgment ==
The Divisional Court agreed that assault cannot be committed by an omission. However, in this case, the crime was not an omission to move the car; rather, it constituted a continual act of battery. The offence was not complete until the moment Fagan realised that he had driven onto the foot of the officer and, in deciding not to cease this continuous act, formed an intent amounting to the mens rea for common assault. Since both mens rea and actus reus were present, an assault had been committed, and Fagan's conviction was upheld.

== See also ==
- English criminal law
- Concurrence
