= Battery (crime) =

Criminal act of unlawful physical contact

Battery is a criminal offense involving "unlawful intentional infliction of harmful or offensive physical contact with another person without consent". It may be either simple or aggravated, and is distinct from assault, which is the act of creating reasonable fear or apprehension of such contact.

Battery is a specific common law offense, although the term is used more generally to refer to any unlawful offensive physical contact with another person. Battery is defined by American common law as "any unlawful and/or unwanted touching of the person of another by the aggressor, or by a substance put in motion by them". In more severe cases, and for all types in some jurisdictions, it is chiefly defined by statutory wording. Assessment of the severity of a battery is determined by local law.

== Generally ==
Specific rules regarding battery vary among different jurisdictions, but some elements remain constant across jurisdictions. Battery generally requires that:

1. an offensive touch or contact is made upon the victim, instigated by the actor; and
2. the actor intends or knows that their action will cause the offensive touching.

Under the US Model Penal Code and in some jurisdictions, there is battery when the actor acts recklessly without specific intent of causing an offensive contact. Battery is typically classified as either simple or aggravated. Although battery typically occurs in the context of physical altercations, it may also occur under other circumstances, such as in medical cases where a doctor performs a non-consented medical procedure.

== Specific countries ==
=== Canada ===
Battery is not defined in the Canadian Criminal Code. Instead, the Code has an offense of assault, and assault causing bodily harm.

=== England and Wales ===
Battery is a common law offence within England and Wales.

As with the majority of offences in the UK, it has two elements:

- Actus reus: The defendant unlawfully touched or applied force to the victim
- Mens rea: The defendant intended or was reckless as to the unlawful touch or application of force

This offence is a crime against autonomy, with more violent crimes such as ABH and GBH being statutory offences under the Offences against the Person Act 1861.

As such, even the slightest of touches can amount to an unlawful application of force. However, it is assumed that everyday encounters (such as making contact with others on public transportation) are consented to and not punishable.

Much confusion can come between the terms "assault" and "battery". In everyday use the term assault may be used to describe a physical attack, which is indeed a battery. An assault is causing someone to apprehend that they will be the victim of a battery. This issue is so prevalent that the crime of sexual assault would be better labelled a sexual battery. This confusion stems from the fact that both assault and battery can be referred to as common assault. In practice, if charged with such an offence, the wording will read "assault by beating", but this means the same as "battery".

There is no separate offence for a battery relating to domestic violence; however, the introduction of the crime of "controlling or coercive behaviour in an intimate or family relationship" in section 76 of the Serious Crime Act 2015 has given rise to new sentencing guidelines that take into account significant aggravating factors such as abuse of trust, resulting in potentially longer sentences for acts of battery within the context of domestic violence.

==== Whether it is a statutory offence ====
In DPP v Taylor, DPP v Little, it was held that battery is a statutory offence, contrary to section 39 of the Criminal Justice Act 1988, although it provides no definition. The court compared the construction of the offence to the treatment of buggery under section 61 of the Offences against the Person Act 1861, which is intended by Parliament to have been abolished when that section was repealed by the Sexual Offences Act 1956. This decision was contradicted in Haystead v DPP where the Divisional Court expressed the obiter opinion that battery remains a common law offence.

Therefore, whilst it may be a better view that battery and assault have statutory penalties, rather than being statutory offences, it is still the case that until review by a higher court, DPP v Little is the preferred authority.

==== Mode of trial and sentence ====
In England and Wales, battery is a summary offence under section 39 of the Criminal Justice Act 1988. However, by virtue of section 40, it can be tried on indictment where another indictable offence is also charged which is founded on the same facts or together with which it forms part of a series of offences of similar character. Where it is tried on indictment a Crown Court has no greater powers of sentencing than a magistrates' court would, unless the battery itself constitutes actual bodily harm or greater.

It is punishable with imprisonment for a term not exceeding six months, or a fine not exceeding level 5 on the standard scale, or both.

==== Defences ====
There are numerous defences to a charge of assault, namely

- Intoxication due to drugs/alcohol - voluntary or involuntary (does not apply to offences which may be committed recklessly, intentionally or with negligence i.e. assault/battery)
- Defence of self or others
- Prevention of crime
- Mistake
- Duress
- Necessity
- Insanity
- Automatism
- Provocation
- Alibi
- Diminished responsibility
- Consent (does not apply when the assault/battery results in ABH or greater)
- Superior orders
- Reasonable chastisement of a child
- Medical procedure
- Sporting activities
- Arrest by Constable
- Arrest by citizen

For provocation, see Tuberville v Savage.

=== Russia ===
There is an offence which could be (loosely) described as battery in Russia. Article 116 of the Russian Criminal Code provides that battery or similar violent actions which cause pain are an offence.

=== Scotland ===
There is no distinct offence of battery in Scotland. The offence of assault includes acts that could be described as battery.

=== United States ===
In the United States, criminal battery, or simple battery, is the use of force against another, resulting in harmful or offensive contact, including sexual contact. At common law, simple battery is a misdemeanor. The prosecutor must prove all three elements beyond a reasonable doubt:

1. an unlawful application of force
2. to the person of another
3. resulting in either bodily injury or offensive touching.

The common-law elements serve as a basic template, but individual jurisdictions may alter them, and they may vary slightly from state to state.

Under modern statutory schemes, battery is often divided into grades that determine the severity of punishment. For example:

- Simple battery may include any form of non-consensual harmful or insulting contact, regardless of the injury caused. Criminal battery requires intent to inflict an injury on another.
- Sexual battery may be defined as non-consensual touching of the intimate parts of another. At least in Florida, "Sexual battery means oral, anal, or vaginal penetration by, or union with, the sexual organ of another or the anal or vaginal penetration of another by any other object": See section 794.011.
- Family-violence battery may be limited in its scope between persons within a certain degree of relationship: statutes for this offense have been enacted in response to increasing awareness of the problem of domestic violence.
- Aggravated battery generally is seen as a serious offense of felony grade. Aggravated battery charges may occur when a battery causes serious bodily injury or permanent disfigurement. As a successor to the common law crime of mayhem, this is sometimes subsumed in the definition of assault. In Florida, aggravated battery is the intentional infliction of great bodily harm and is a second-degree felony, whereas battery that unintentionally causes great bodily harm is considered a third-degree felony.

==== Kansas ====
In the state of Kansas, battery is defined as follows:

Battery.
(a) Battery is:
(1) Knowingly or recklessly causing bodily harm to another person; or
(2) knowingly causing physical contact with another person when done in a rude, insulting, or angry manner.

==== Louisiana ====
The law on battery in Louisiana reads:

§ 33. Battery defined:
Battery is the intentional use of force or violence upon the person of another; or the intentional administration of a poison or other noxious liquid or substance to another.

== See also ==
- Assault (tort)
- Assault occasioning actual bodily harm
- Battery (tort)
- The dictionary definition of beat up at Wiktionary
- Non-fatal offences against the person in English law
- Right of self-defense
