= R v Constanza =

1997 English criminal law case on assault

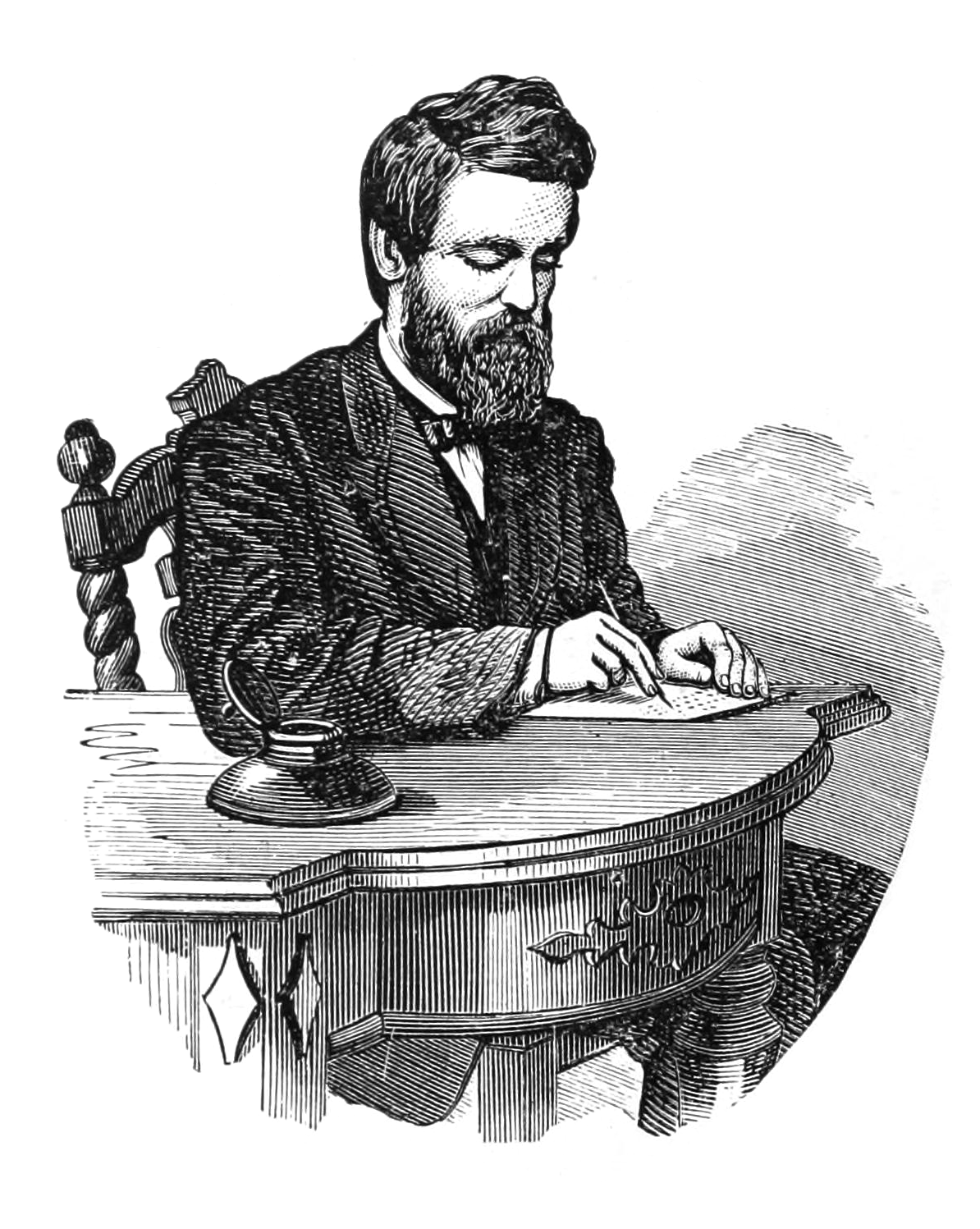
- Court: Court of Appeal (Criminal Division)
- Full case name: R v Gaetano Constanza
- Decided: 6 March 1997
- Citations: [1997] 2 Cr App R 492; The Times, March 31, 1997
- Cases cited: None
- Legislation cited: Offences Against the Person Act 1861 s. 47

Case history
- Prior action: Conviction in Luton Crown Court. Presided by HHJ Moss. (Unreported)
- Subsequent action: None

Court membership
- Judges sitting: Schiemann LJ; Mr Justice Curtis (Curtis J); Sir Neil Denison (the Common Serjeant) both acting as judge of the Court of Appeal

Keywords
- Assault; Harassment

R v Constanza [1997] is a Court of Appeal (England and Wales) decision on the English criminal law on assault. The court held that words, including written words, can amount to an assault, and that the requirement that the victim fear "immediate" violence is satisfied if the victim fears violence at some time "not including the immediate future", and it is for the prosecution to prove that fear was in the victim's mind; how it got there is irrelevant. The case is an authoritative precedent on assault.

== Facts ==
Over two years, Gaetano Constanza followed a former work colleague home, made numerous silent telephone calls to her, sent her over 800 letters over a period of 4 months, repeatedly drove past and visited her home, and wrote offensive words on her door. He was charged with assault occasioning actual bodily harm contrary to section 47 of the Offences against the Person Act 1861. The case against him was that his behaviour was such as to cause the victim (Louise Wilson) to feel that his actions posed a threat to her personal safety. Constanza had delivered a letter by hand which when read caused belief Constanza had "flipped" and would use force against her. There was medical evidence of a resultant clinical state of depression and anxiety. The Crown said that Constanza's actions had occasioned actual bodily harm.

== Judgment ==
Constanza appealed against his conviction on the grounds that the case ought not to have been left to the jury as the violence that the victim feared had not been sufficiently immediate because the victim could not see the potential perpetrator. Constanza also argued that an assault could not be committed solely by words, but physical action was necessary.

The appeal was dismissed. The Court of Appeal held that the time to start measuring the immediacy of the apprehended violence is the time when the victim has the fear, that it would not be right to leave the case to the jury when the violence was anticipated at some time in the distant future and that it is not necessary for the victim to be able to see the potential perpetrator of the violence. In this case, as the victim had believed that the violence could occur at any time, the judge was entitled to leave the question of whether or not the victim had a fear of immediate violence to the jury. The Court of Appeal also held that it is for the Crown (the Prosecution) to prove that fear was in the victim's mind and that it is irrelevant how it got there and that certain conduct accompanying words could make that an assault. Therefore, the appellant had committed assault.

== Precautionary government reaction ==
In case of further instances, argued or appealed successfully for the defence, based on remoteness of the truly feared action, Parliament, passing a government bill, introduced the Protection from Harassment Act 1997. Its maximum sentence is custodial.
