= Grievous bodily harm =

Severest form of battery in English law

Assault occasioning grievous bodily harm (often abbreviated to GBH) is a term used in English criminal law to describe the severest forms of battery. It refers to two offences that are created by sections 18 and 20 of the Offences against the Person Act 1861. The distinction between these two sections is the requirement of specific intent for section 18; the offence under section 18 is variously referred to as "wounding with intent" or "causing grievous bodily harm with intent", whereas the offence under section 20 is variously referred to as "unlawful wounding", "malicious wounding" or "inflicting grievous bodily harm".

The offence is also known in Canada, as the most severe gradation of assault. It is a tradition handed down since at least 1879. It shows up in 10 U.S.C. § 920(g)(4), which deals with "rape and sexual assault generally".

== Statute ==
=== Section 18 ===
This section now reads:

Whosoever shall unlawfully and maliciously by any means whatsoever wound or cause any grievous bodily harm to any person, ... with intent, ... to do some ... grievous bodily harm to any person, or with intent to resist or prevent the lawful apprehension or detainer of any person, shall be guilty of felony, and being convicted thereof shall be liable ... to be kept in penal servitude for life ...

The words omitted in the first to third places specifically included shooting or attempting to shoot, and included some words considered redundant; they were repealed by section 10(2) of, and Part III of Schedule 3 to, the Criminal Law Act 1967.

The words omitted in the penultimate place ("at the discretion of the court") were repealed by the Statute Law Revision (No. 2) Act 1893.

The words omitted at the end were repealed by the Statute Law Revision Act 1892 (words limiting penal servitude to at least three years, or imprisonment to at most two years, and removing mention of hard labour) and the Statute Law Revision (No. 2) Act 1893 (words prescribing imprisonment as an alternative to penal servitude).

This section replaces section 4 of the Offences against the Person Act 1837, which in turn replaced section 12 of the Offences against the Person Act 1828, which in turn replaced section 1 of Lord Ellenborough's Act (1803).

=== Section 20 ===
In England and Wales, section 20 now reads:

Whosoever shall unlawfully and maliciously wound or inflict any grievous bodily harm upon any other person, either with or without any weapon or instrument, shall be guilty of a misdemeanor, and being convicted thereof shall be liable ... to be kept in penal servitude ...

The words omitted were repealed by the Statute Law Revision Act 1892, as for section 18.

In Northern Ireland, it reads:

Whosoever shall unlawfully and maliciously wound or inflict any grievous bodily harm upon any other person, either with or without any weapon or instrument, shall be guilty of an offence and liable, on conviction on indictment, to imprisonment for a term not exceeding 7 years.

This was subject to the same omissions as in England; the Criminal Justice (No. 2) (Northern Ireland) Order 2004 enacted the other amendments.

=== Interpretation ===
==== Felony ====
The distinction between felony and misdemeanor was abolished by the Criminal Law Act 1967. Accordingly, "guilty of felony" and "guilty of a misdemeanour" are both to be read as "guilty of an offence". The Criminal Law Act (Northern Ireland) 1967 provided the same for Northern Ireland, until the 1861 Act was amended in 2004 to update the formulation.

==== Penal servitude ====
Penal servitude was abolished by the Criminal Justice Act 1948 and the Criminal Justice Act (Northern Ireland) 1953. Accordingly, the phrase "penal servitude" is to be read as "imprisonment".

== The offences ==
None of the words used in these sections are defined elsewhere in the Act, but they have been defined by case law.

=== Wound ===
For this purpose, a wound is an injury that breaks the continuity of the skin. There must be a division of the whole skin and not merely a division of the cuticle or upper layer.

A single drop of blood is sufficient, but it must fall outside the body: see JJC (a minor) v. Eisenhower (1984) 78 Cr App R 48. In this case, a pellet gun was fired at the victim. The bullet ruptured blood vessels above his eye, causing his eye to fill with fluid. Lord Justice Robert Goff said the rupturing of blood vessels is an internal wound; only the breaking of whole skin would warrant a wounding charge.

A bruise or internal rupturing of blood vessels is not a wound, and neither is a broken bone.

Grievous bodily harm means "really serious bodily harm": DPP v Smith [1961] AC 290, HL; R v Cunningham [1982] AC 566, HL; R v Brown (A) [1994] 1 AC 212, HL; R v Brown and Stratton [1998] Crim LR 485, CA. It encompasses a range of injuries: R v Woodland (2007) 48 MVR 360.

However, R v Saunders [1985] Crim LR 230, [1985] LS Gaz R 1005, allows "serious injury" as a sufficient direction to the jury. It is for the judge to decide whether the word "really" needs to be used in their direction to the jury: R v Janjua and Choudhury [1999] 1 Cr App R 91, The Times, 8 May 1998, CA (in this case, as a knife with a blade at least 5 1/2 inches long had been used, it was not possible that something less than really serious harm was intended).

=== Inflict and cause ===
In R v Martin, shortly before the conclusion of a performance at a theatre, the defendant put out the lights on a staircase which a large number of persons had to descend in order to leave the theatre, and he also obstructed the exit by placing an iron bar across a doorway which they had in leaving to pass, and upon the lights being thus extinguished, a large proportion of the audience were seized by panic and rushed in fright down the staircase forcing those in front against the iron bar; he "inflicted" injuries which resulted by reason of the pressure and struggling of the crowd thus created on the staircase.

Legal scholar David Ormerod said that the effect of the decision in R v Gibbins and Proctor appears to be that the offence of causing grievous bodily harm under section 18 can be committed by an omission.

In R v Mandair, Lord Mackay of Clashfern LC said, with the agreement of the majority of the House of Lords, "In my opinion ... the word 'cause' is wider or at least not narrower than the word 'inflict'".

In R v Burstow, R v Ireland, it was held that an offence of inflicting grievous bodily harm under section 20 of the Offences against the Person Act 1861 can be committed where no physical violence is applied directly or indirectly to the body of the victim.

Lord Hope of Craighead said "the word 'inflict' implies that the consequence of the act is something which the victim is likely to find unpleasant or harmful." He said that, in the context of a criminal act, the words "cause" and "inflict" may be taken to be interchangeable.

Lord Steyn described the actions of Burstow as follows: "During an eight-month period in 1995 covered by the indictment he continued his campaign of harassment. He made some silent telephone calls to her. He also made abusive calls to her. He distributed offensive cards in the street where she lived. He was frequently, and unnecessarily, at her home and place of work. He surreptitiously took photographs of the victim and her family. He sent her a note which was intended to be menacing, and was so understood."

==== 1983 to 1997 ====
In R v Wilson, R v Jenkins, Lord Roskill said:

In our opinion, grievous bodily harm may be inflicted ... either where the accused has directly and violently "inflicted" it by assaulting the victim, or where the accused has "inflicted" it by doing something, intentionally, which, although it is not itself a direct application of force to the body of the victim, does directly result in force being applied violently to the body of the victim, so that he suffers grievous bodily harm.

==== Before 1983 ====
In R v Clarence (1888), it appeared that at a time when the prisoner knew, but his wife did not know, that he was suffering from gonorrhoea, he had "connection" with her; that the result was that the disease was communicated to her, and that had she been aware of his condition she would not have submitted to the intercourse.

Clarence's conviction under section 20 was quashed by the Court for Crown Cases Reserved by a majority of 9 to 4. Wills, A. L. Smith, and Stephen JJ specifically said that they thought the disease had not been inflicted within the meaning of the word "inflict" in section 20. Mathew J said that he agreed with Stephen. Stephen said that he had been informed that Grantham J agreed with him. Huddleston B said that he thoroughly agreed with Stephen. Lord Coleridge CJ said that he agreed with all or almost all of what Wills and Stephen said. Hawkins J specifically said that he thought it had been inflicted within the meaning of the word "inflict" in section 20.

Wills J said (footnotes have been included in the body of the text, indicated by "(1)"):

But I think the section clearly points to the infliction of direct and intentional violence, whether with a weapon, or the fist, or the foot, or any other part of the person or in any other way not involving the use of the weapon, as for instance by creating a panic at a theatre whereby people trampled on one another: Reg. v. Martin. (1) 8 Q. B. D. 54 The prisoner in that case did what was certain to make people crush one another, perhaps to death, and the grievous bodily harm was as truly inficted by him as if he had hurled a stone at someone's head. Take also the illustration of my brother Stephen, of a man who digs a pit for another to fall into, whereby that other is injured. I do not think that this section was ever intended to apply to the administration of poison, and most of the arguments I have used to shew that sexual offences were not intended to be dealt with in s. 47 apply with equal force to s. 20. The Court for the consideration of Crown Cases Reserved in Reg. v. Taylor (1) Law Rep. 1 C. c. R. 194. decided that in the offence of "unlawfully and maliciously inflicting grievous bodily harm", an assault is necessarily included. So far as the decision is concerned, the same question may be said to arise under s. 20 as under s. 47. But I think the argument is even stronger here, for the context seems to me to shew that direct personal violence of some kind was intended, so that even if the constructive assault contended for by those who support a conviction under s. 47 were established, a conviction under this section would still be wrong.

Stephen J said:

But is there an "infliction of bodily harm either with or without any weapon or instrument"? I think not for the following reasons. The words appear to me to mean the direct causing of some grievous injury to the body itself with a weapon, as by a cut with a knife, or without a weapon, as by a blow with the fist, or by pushing a person down. Indeed, though the word "assault" is not used in the section, I think the words imply an assault and battery of which a wound or grievous bodily harm is the manifest immediate and obvious result.

A. L. Smith J said "it appears to me that this offence cannot be committed unless an assault has in fact been committed, and indeed this has been so held".

Hawkins J said that he thought that the contention that bodily harm cannot be legally said to be "inflicted" unless it has been brought about by some act amounting to an assault was untenable.

=== Maliciously ===
In R v Mowatt, Lord Diplock said:

In the offence under section 20 ... the word "maliciously" does import upon the part of the person who unlawfully inflicts the wound or other grievous bodily harm an awareness that his act may have the consequence of causing some physical harm to some other person ... It is quite unnecessary that the accused should have foreseen that his unlawful act might cause physical harm of the gravity described in the section, i.e. a wound or serious physical injury. It is enough that he should have foreseen that some physical harm to some person, albeit of a minor character, might result.

Therefore, the defendant must at least be reckless as to whether some harm, albeit not necessarily serious harm, is likely to be caused (see R v Savage, DPP v Parmenter), but a mere intention to frighten is not enough (see R v Sullivan).

In R v Sullivan [1981] Crim LR 46, CA, the appellant was tried on charges of causing grievous bodily harm with intent and inflicting grievous bodily harm. The victim said that the appellant and a companion were drunk. He said that while he was in a street that was eight feet wide and had a narrow pavement, the appellant drove a car through that street at twenty-five to thirty miles an hour, mounted the pavement and injured him. The appellant denied that he was the driver of the car in a written statement to the police and said he could add nothing to that statement in an unsworn statement from the dock. However, during his closing speech, counsel for the defence suggested that all the appellant intended to do was frighten the victim and no more. The jury were directed that if there was an intention to frighten, and injury took place as a result, the appellant was guilty of an offence under section 20. The appellant was acquitted of the offence under section 18, but convicted of offences under section 20. The Court of Appeal held that an intention to frighten was not enough to constitute the necessary mens rea for section 20, and that the direction to the contrary effect was a misdirection. However, they dismissed the appellant's appeal. They said that a properly directed jury could not in the circumstances have come to any other conclusion than that the appellant must have been aware that what he was doing was likely to cause physical injury to the victim.

In practice, malice in the case of these offences means no more than foresight of the risk of bodily harm: R v Barnes [2005] 1 Cr App R 30.

=== Specific intent ===
Section 18 has two separate mens rea requirements and is therefore an offence of specific rather than basic intent. In R v Belfon [1976] 1 WLR 741, the Court of Appeal confirmed that references to mere foresight or recklessness that harm was likely to result are sufficient for the element "unlawfully and maliciously inflict/cause" for the basic intent in both sections 18 and 20 but insufficient for the specific element. The intention either to cause or to resist arrest must be proved subjectively, say, in the charge "malicious wounding with intent to cause grievous bodily harm".

The Crown Prosecution Service says that the following factors may be evidence of intention:

- selection and use of a particular weapon
- severity or duration of attack
- making prior threats or planning a serious attack
- relevant admissions in interview

=== Alternative verdicts ===
Sections 20 and 47 are offences of basic intent and can be an alternative charge to section 18, and/or section 47 is a lesser included offence.

=== Consent ===
Consent is only an allowed defence to either section if there is considered to be a good reason. This may include medical operations, sport, tattooing (even if carried out by someone who is not trained), and, occasionally, "horseplay".

Body modification, other than "tattooing, piercing or other body adornment", cannot be consented to.

R v Brown (Anthony) however ruled that sadomasochistic sexual acts are not a good reason to allow a defence of consent. This decision was approved in s.71 Domestic Abuse Act 2021. This comes with the exception where (a) The Serious Harm consists of, or is a result of the infection of the victim with a sexually transmitted infection, and (b) that V consented to the sexual activity in the knowledge or belief that the defendant had the sexually transmitted infection.

The relevant case to this exception is R v Dica in which it was held that infection with an STD consists of grievous bodily harm when one is aware they possess the disease and is reckless as to its transmission. Both parties must be aware of the disease for infection to be consensual.

=== Attempt ===
According to the CPS, in relation to the offence of attempted GBH, "It is not possible to attempt [a Section 20] offence because in order to attempt it, the consequence (wounding or GBH) must be intended, which is an offence contrary to section 18 instead."

Causing death, even accidentally, in the course of attempting a section 18 offence is murder, not manslaughter. Attempted murder nonetheless requires the specific intent to kill.

== Mode of trial ==
In England and Wales, the offence under section 18 is an indictable-only offence, while the offence under section 20 is triable either way.

== Sentence ==
=== Section 18 ===
In England and Wales, an offence under section 18 is punishable with imprisonment for life or for any shorter term.

See the sentencing guidelines for case law on sentencing of section 18. Relevant cases are:

- Attorney General's Reference (No. 14 of 2008) (Cook) [2009] 1 Cr App R (S) 62
- Attorney General's Reference (No. 44 of 2008) (Patterson) [2009] 1 Cr App R (S) 111
- Attorney General's Reference (No. 49 of 2008) (Blake) [2009] 1 Cr App R (S) 109
- R v Stanley [2008] 2 Cr App R (S) 107
- Attorney General's Reference (No. 6 of 2009) (DR) [2009] 2 Cr App R (S) 108
- Attorney General's Reference (No. 14 of 2009) (Morgan) [2010] 1 Cr App R (S) 17
- Attorney General's Reference (No. 95 of 2009) (Blight) [2010] EWCA Crim 353
- R v Cross [2009] 1 Cr App R (S) 34
- R v Smith [2009] 1 Cr App R (S) 37
- R v Bowley [2009] 1 Cr App R (S) 79
- R v Chatburn [2010] EWCA Crim 115
- R v Haystead [2010] 1 Cr App R (S) 107

In Northern Ireland, an offence under section 18 is punishable with imprisonment for life or for any shorter term.

=== Section 20 ===
In England and Wales, a person guilty of an offence under section 20 is liable, on conviction on indictment, to imprisonment for a term not exceeding five years, or on summary conviction to imprisonment for a term not exceeding six months, or to a fine not exceeding the prescribed sum, or to both.

Where a person is convicted on indictment of an offence under section 20, other than an offence for which the sentence falls to be imposed under section 227 or 228 of the Criminal Justice Act 2003, the court, if not precluded from sentencing an offender by its exercise of some other power, may impose a fine instead of or in addition to dealing with him in any other way in which the court has power to deal with him, subject however to any enactment requiring the offender to be dealt with in a particular way.

An offence under section 20 is a specified offence for the purposes of part 12, chapter 5 of the Criminal Justice Act 2003 because it is a specified violent offence. It is not a serious offence for the purposes of that Chapter because it is not, apart from section 225, punishable in the case of a person aged 18 or over by imprisonment for life, or by imprisonment for a determinate period of ten years or more. This means that sections 227 and 228 of the Criminal Justice Act 2003 (which relate to extended sentences) apply where a person is convicted of an offence under section 20, committed after the commencement of section 227 or 228 (as the case may be) and the court considers that there is a significant risk to members of the public of serious harm occasioned by the commission by the offender of further specified offences.

See the sentencing guidelines for case law on sentencing of section 20.

The following cases are relevant to section 20:

- R v Robertson [1997] EWCA Crim 918 (16 April 1997), 1 Cr App R (S) 21
- R v Byrne [1997] EWCA Crim 1174 (13 May 1997), 1 Cr App R (S) 105
- R v McNellis [2000] 1 Cr App R (S) 481
- R v Clare [2002] 2 Cr App R (S) 97
- R v Foote [2005] 2 Cr App R (S) 5
- R v Hall [2008] EWCA 1208
- R v Olawo [2008] 2 Cr App R (S) 113
- R v Owen [2009] 1 Cr App R (S) 64
- R v Shannon [2009] 1 Cr App R (S) 95
- R v Hurley [2009] 1 Cr App R (S) 100
- R v Burns [2009] EWCA Crim 2150
- R v Williamson [2010] 1 Cr App R (S) 16
- R v Abdile [2010] 1 Cr App R (S) 18
- R v Kee [2010] 1 Cr App R (S) 64

In Northern Ireland, a person guilty of an offence under section 20 is liable, on conviction on indictment, to imprisonment for a term not exceeding seven years, or on summary conviction to imprisonment for a term not exceeding twelve months, or to a fine not exceeding the prescribed sum, or to both.

== Racially or religiously aggravated offence ==
In England and Wales, section 29(1)(a) of the Crime and Disorder Act 1998 (c 37) creates the distinct offence of racially or religiously aggravated wounding or infliction of bodily harm. This is an aggravated version of the offence under section 20 punishable by up to seven years' imprisonment.

== See also ==
- Assault occasioning actual bodily harm (ABH)
- Bodily harm
- Non-fatal offences against the person in English law
- Offence against the person
