= R v Ireland =

English criminal law case

R v Ireland; R v Burstow
- Court: House of Lords
- Decided: June 24, 1997
- Citation: [1997] UKHL 34, [1997] 4 All ER 225, [1998] AC 147, [1998] 1 Cr App Rep 177, [1998] 1 Cr App R 177, [1997] 3 WLR 534

Case history
- Appealed from: Court of Appeal
- Appealed to: The House of Lords

Court membership
- Judges sitting: Lord Goff of Chieveley, Lord Slynn of Hadley, Lord Steyn, Lord Hope of Craighead and Lord Hutton

R v Ireland; R v Burstow was the 1997 appeal of two cases in English criminal law with the question as to whether or not psychiatric injury was considered 'bodily harm' under Section 47 of the Offences Against the Person Act 1861.

== Facts ==
=== R v Ireland ===
R v Ireland consisted of Mr. Robert Ireland making a large number of telephone calls to three separate women. Ireland would not speak during the calls and rang often late at night. He was convicted under Section 47 Actual Bodily Harm of the Offences Against the Person Act 1861 and his case was appealed to the then presiding court, House of Lords.

=== R v Burstow ===
In the case of R v Burstow, Anthony Burstow stalking and intimidation campaign against his ex-partner for eight months. Making silent phone calls, transmitting menacing messages, physically following her and photographing her and her family. The victim suffered a severe depressive illness as a result. Burstow was convicted of Grievous bodily harm contract to Section 20 of the Offences Against the Person Act 1861. He appealed his case to the House of Lords on the grounds that silence cannot amount to Assault or Bodily harm.

== Ruling ==
The defendant appealed, sending the case to the House of Lords which, pre-Constitutional Reform Act 2005 and the founding of the United Kingdom Supreme Court, was the highest court in the land.

The decision to convict the defendant Ireland was upheld by the House of Lords, finding assault in English law can be found without verbal interaction.

Lord Steyn said

The proposition that a gesture may amount to an assault, but that words can never suffice, is unrealistic and indefensible. A thing said is also a thing done. There is no reason why something said should be incapable of causing an apprehension of immediate personal violence

The decision in Burstow was that the word 'inflict' as in 'inflict bodily harm' can be interpreted as 'caused' and thus does not require any proof of a direct application of force. As severe psychological illnesses could therefore become Grievous Bodily Harm even though no physical 'bodily force' was ever inflicted.

The Lords additionally noted that as an assault is the fear of violence, it must be a fear of immediate violence, as in 'within a minute or two'.
