= List of Sir John Holt's cases =

List of Sir John Holt's cases.

== By date ==
- Enfield v Hills 83 E.R. 535; (1677) 2 Lev. 236
- King v Dilliston 89 E.R. 465; (1686) 1 Show. K.B. 83
- Evans v Cramlington 90 E.R. 608; (1687) Carth. 5
- Hawkins v Taylor & ux', and Leigh & al 23 E.R. 628; (1687) 2 Vern. 29
- Shuttleworth v Garret 89 E.R. 431; (1688) 1 Show. K.B. 35
- Edleston v Speake 90 E.R. 1021; (1689) Holt K.B. 222
- Crosse v Gardner (1689) Cart. 90, Lord Holt CJ held that ‘An affirmation at the time of a sale is a warranty, provided it appears on evidence to be so intended.’
- The tryal and condemnation of Capt. Thomas Vaughan for high treason (1696)
- Turberville v Stampe (1697) 91 ER 1072 (nuisance and vicarious liability)
- Medina v Staughton (1699) 1 Salk. 210, again on affirmations and warranties.
- Moordike v Hathaway (1701)
- King v Hathaway (1702)
- Coggs v Bernard (1703) 2 Ld Raym 909 (bailment)
- Ashby v White (1703) 2 Ld Raym 938 (the right to vote)
- Cole v Turner (1704) 87 ER 907 (definition of battery)
- Walden v Holman (1704) 6 Mod 115, Ld Raym. 1015, 1 Salk. 6 (pleading in abatement; the legal name of a person)
- Smith v Gould (1705–07) 2 Salk 666 (antagonism to slavery)
- Keeble v Hickeringill (1707) 11 East 574 (interference with property rights, "the duck pond case")

== See also ==
- Lex mercatoria
