= Vernon Knight Associates v Cornwall Council =

2013 British legal case

- Court: Court of Appeal
- Full case name: Vernon Knight Associates (Claimant) v Cornwall Council (Defendant)
- Decided: 30 July 2013
- Citation: [2013] EWCA Civ 950

Court membership
- Judges sitting: Lord Dyson; Lord Justice Jackson; Sir Stanley Burnton

Keywords
- Flood; liability; natural nuisances

Vernon Knight Associates v Cornwall Council [2013] EWCA 950 is a Court of Appeal case about liability for damage that arises from escaping flood water.

== Facts ==
Honiscombe Manor, near Callington in Cornwall, was a former manor house run as a holiday village. The Honiscombe Road ran along its northern boundary. Vernon Knight Associates owned Honiscombe Manor and Cornwall Council owned the Honiscombe Road. The land sloped down from the Honiscombe Road towards the holiday village, and after heavy rainfall the Honiscombe Road had a tendency to flood. If the water rose past a certain point, it would discharge towards the manor house. To prevent this, the council had installed surface water drainage on the Honiscombe Road. The surface water drains were covered by gratings which, to be effective, needed from time to time to be cleared of fallen leaves and other detritus.

On Friday 24 November 2006, more than 60mm of rain fell. This caused widespread flooding in Callington and Launceston. The surface water drains on the Honiscombe Road had last been cleared six weeks ago, and were blocked. The holiday village flooded, causing damage costing some £123,391.41 to repair. Nearly two years later, on Thursday 4 November 2008 and the day after, similar events occurred with somewhat less extreme rainfall. The damage cost £18,233.77 to repair.

Vernon Knight Associates claimed damage against the council.

== Law ==
The law had developed from Rylands v Fletcher [1886] LR 3 HL 330, in which case it was said that if water on the defendant's land flowed onto the plaintiff's land by the operation of nature then there could be no liability. By way of Sedleigh-Denfield v O'Callaghan [1940] AC 880 and Goldman v Hargrave [1967] AC 645, the courts had begun to decide that landowners were liable for the escape of water which they could have prevented by taking simple, obvious steps. By the time of this case, the standard was a "measured duty of care" taking into account the defendant's resources and abilities, as well as the fact that the hazard arose through no fault of the defendant's. This was sometimes called the law of "natural nuisances".

== Courts below ==
The courts below found for Vernon Knight Associates, and the Council appealed.

== Judgment ==
In a judgment with which all three law lords agreed, the appeal was dismissed.

== Significance ==
This case decided that, in natural nuisances cases, the court needs to balance what is fair, just, and reasonable between neighbours. When there is a foreseeable risk, landowners should take reasonable and proportionate steps to reduce it. When deciding what is reasonable and proportionate, the court will take into account the costs of the works and the resources available to the landowner.
