= Turberville =

- Pronunciation: English: /tɜːrbɜːrvɪl/

Origin
- Origin: English
- Derivation: Thouberville, a French village

Other names
- Alternative spelling: Turbervile; Turburville; Turbervill

Turberville, sometimes Turbervile or Turburville, is an English surname derived from a French toponymic - a French village called Thouberville. Two prominent ancient English families of this name existed: Turberville of Coity Castle in Glamorgan and Turberville of Bere Regis in Dorset. Notable people with the surname include:

== Surname ==
Arms of Turberville of Bere Regis

- Arthur Stanley Turberville (1888–1945), British historian
- Edward Turberville (c. 1648–1681), Welsh informer and perjurer
- George Turberville (c. 1540–before 1597), English poet
- Henry de Turberville (died 1239), English soldier, Seneschal of Gascony
- James Turberville (died c.1570), English bishop

== Middle name ==
- John Turberville Needham (1713 – 1781), English biologist and Roman Catholic priest

== See also ==
- Thomas Hardy's novel Tess of the d'Urbervilles, in which the d'Urberville family was based on the mediaeval Turberville family of Bere Regis, Dorset
- Turberville v Stampe (1697), English tort law case
- Tuberville (disambiguation)
