= Peter Seaman =

Peter Seaman may refer to:

- Jeffrey Price and Peter S. Seaman, American screenwriter and producer
- Peter Seaman (mayor), English politician
- Peter Seaman (badminton) (born 1944), Welsh badminton player
