= Cockcroft v Smith =

English tort law case

Cockcroft v Smith (1705) 11 Mod 43 is an English tort law case. It concerned the definition of legitimate self defence.

== Facts ==
Mr. Cockcroft ran his finger towards Mr. Smith's eyes. Mr. Smith bit off part of Mr. Cockcroft's finger.

== Judgment ==
Holt CJ said in the course of his judgment,

if a man strike another, who does not immediately after resent it, but take his opportunity, and then some time after falls upon him and beats him, in this case, son assault is no good plea; neither ought a man, in case of a small assault give a violent or an unsuitable return; but in such case plead what is necessary for a man's defence, and not who struck first; though this, he said, has been the common practice, but this he wished was altered; for hitting a man a little blow with a little stick on the shoulder, is not a reason for him to draw a sword and cut and hew the other...

== See also ==
- English tort law
- battery
- Self defence
- Ashley v Chief Constable of Sussex Police [2007] 1 WLR 398
- Criminal Law Act 1967 s 3
- Criminal Justice Act 2003 s 329
