= Tuberville =

Tuberville may refer to:

- Tommy Tuberville (born 1954), American football coach and Senator
- Tuberville v Savage (1669), an English legal decision on assault

== See also ==
- Turberville, a surname
