= George Wilson (Royal Navy officer) =

Royal Navy officer (1756–1826)

Admiral George Wilson
- Born: 4 March 1756
- Died: 6 March 1826 (aged 70); Redgrave Hall, Suffolk
- Relatives: Rowland Holt, uncle William Raven, brother-in-law
- Military career
- Allegiance: Great Britain; United Kingdom
- Branch: Royal Navy
- Service years: 1775–1826
- Rank: Admiral of the Red
- Commands: HMS Gaspée; HMS Eurydice; HMS Fame; HMS Inconstant; HMS Bellona
- Conflicts: American Revolutionary War; Battle of Ushant; Battle of Saint Kitts; Battle of the Saintes; French Revolutionary Wars; Invasion of Trinidad (1797); Battle of San Juan (1797)
- Other work: Magistrate for Suffolk

Admiral of the Red George Wilson (4 March 1756 – 6 March 1826) was a Royal Navy officer who served in the American Revolutionary War and the French Revolutionary Wars. The son of a Chief Justice of Dominica, he joined the navy as a follower of Sir John Jervis on board the ship of the line HMS Foudroyant. In January 1780 he served on Vice-Admiral Richard Howe's flagship HMS Victory at the relief of Gibraltar, after which he was promoted to post-captain. While in command of the post ship HMS Eurydice he participated in the Battle of Saint Kitts and Battle of the Saintes in 1782 before he was appointed to the ship of the line HMS Fame.

Wilson was given command of the frigate HMS Inconstant during the Spanish Armament and then at the beginning of the French Revolutionary War, the ship of the line HMS Bellona. In Bellona he served extensively on the Leeward Islands Station, taking a 44-gun frigate in January 1795. He was then present at the Capitulation of Saldanha Bay in 1796 and the invasions of Trinidad and Porto Rico in 1797. In 1799 Wilson was promoted to rear-admiral and rose through the ranks by seniority to become an admiral of the red in 1819, however he never served at sea as an admiral. He died at his seat Redgrave Hall in Suffolk on 6 March 1826 at the age of seventy.

== Early life ==
George Wilson was born the son of the Honourable Thomas Wilson, who served as Chief Justice of Dominica, on 4 March 1756. His grandfather, Richard, also served in that position.

== Naval career ==
=== Early career ===
Wilson joined the Royal Navy in around 1775 as a midshipman under Captain Sir John Jervis, where he served with him in the ship of the line HMS Foudroyant. Wilson was promoted to lieutenant on 28 January 1776. He briefly commanded the newly-recovered HMS Gaspée from July 1776 to early 1777. In 1777 Foudroyant joined the Channel Fleet and as such he participated on 27 July 1778 in the Battle of Ushant. By 1780 Wilson was serving on the flagship of Vice-Admiral Richard Howe, the ship of the line HMS Victory, and took part in the successful relief of Gibraltar in January after which in February he was promoted to post-captain.

=== Post-captain ===
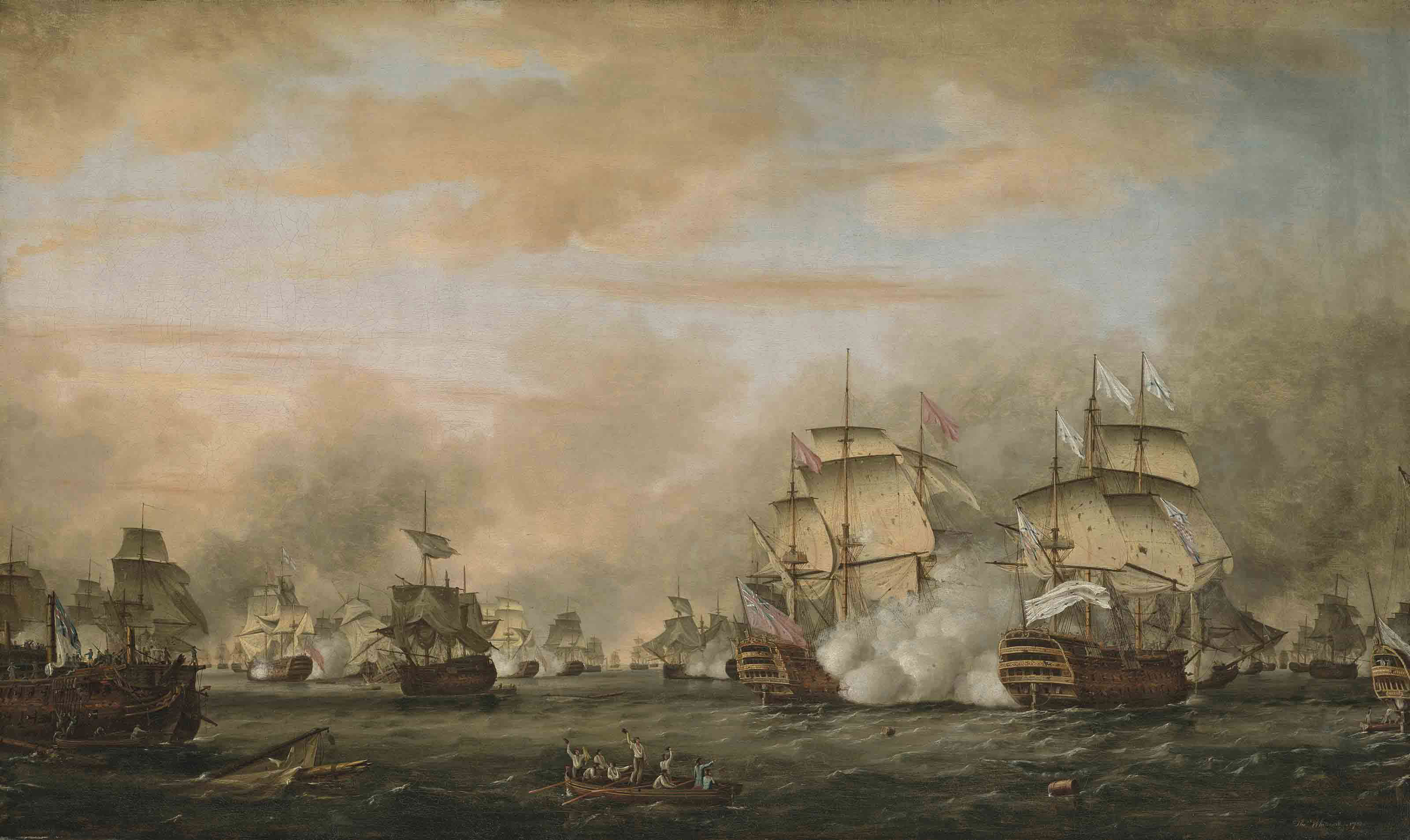
The Battle of the Saintes

His first action as a post-captain was to take command of the recently captured Spanish ship of the line Guipuscoano as HMS Prince William. In January 1781 he took command of the brand new post ship HMS Eurydice and sailed to join the squadron of Sir Samuel Hood in the Leeward Islands. As such he participated in the Battle of Saint Kitts in January 1782 where after the French fleet had been repulsed, his was one of four ships that covered the landings of the invasion itself. Continuing in Hood's squadron, Eurydice and Wilson were thus participants in the Battle of the Saintes between 9 and 12 April, where the French admiral François Joseph Paul de Grasse was finally captured. After having made a trip back to England with dispatches Wilson returned and was appointed to the command of the ship of the line HMS Fame in either April or May, staying with Hood's squadron to cruise off Hispaniola to observe the remaining enemy forces. On 21 July Fame and Wilson sailed to America to wait out the hurricane months with the fleet of Admiral Hugh Pigot. Wilson stayed at New York between 5 September and 24 October before returning to the Leeward Islands. He continued there until the American Revolutionary War began to end, paying off Fame in July 1783.

Wilson's next command came in August 1790 when he was given command of the frigate HMS Inconstant to prepare for any action resulting from the Spanish Armament that year and a similar threat from Russia in the following year. He was such a popular officer that he was able to find a complete crew for Inconstant within twenty-four hours of his assuming command. When the disputes were settled diplomatically he relinquished his command in September 1791. Wilson was not unemployed for long, as with the French Revolutionary War beginning he was given command of the ship of the line HMS Bellona in March 1793, serving in the fleet of Admiral, the now Lord, Howe in the English Channel. On 13 October 1794 he and Bellona were detached from the fleet to join Vice-Admiral Benjamin Caldwell in sailing for the Leeward Islands Station and the West Indies, which Caldwell had been appointed commander-in-chief of. They arrived at Martinique on 14 November.

While Caldwell served only briefly as commander-in-chief Wilson and Bellona stayed on the station, and on 5 January 1795 Bellona was cruising off Deseada Island in company with the frigate HMS Alarm when they discovered a fleet of French transports. The transports were escorted by two frigates and three armed ships; one of these, the 20-gun Duras, was taken by the pair in the ensuing action. Wilson continued his successful month by later capturing the French 44-gun frigate la Duquesne, adding that to a tally of ships taken in the Leeward Islands that included several privateers. (Note: Rif Winfield has la Duquesne as a 36-gun frigate instead of a 44.) One of these was the privateer schooner La Bellone, taken on 11 May.

The invasion of Trinidad

Wilson sailed Bellona home to England sometime after this but returned on 13 February 1796 to join the Cape of Good Hope Squadron of Rear-Admiral George Elphinstone. On 17 August the squadron forced the surrender of a Dutch expeditionary force in the Capitulation of Saldanha Bay. Wilson and Bellona then continued their attacks on privateers, taking the French 6-gun La Legere off Cape Descada on 7 January 1797 and destroying another three days later. Wilson then took part in the successful invasion of Trinidad in February and in April similarly participated in the unsuccessful invasion of Puerto Rico. In the former invasion Wilson assisted with the other ships of the line of Rear-Admiral Henry Harvey's fleet in destroying a Spanish squadron of four ships of the line and a frigate before the main invasion force of Lieutenant-General Sir Ralph Abercromby landed. Towards the end of 1797 Wilson was sent back to England in Bellona where he re-joined the Channel Fleet.

=== Flag rank ===
Wilson was promoted to rear admiral on 14 February 1799 at which point he left Bellona and the Channel Fleet; he would not go to sea again. By seniority he became a vice-admiral on 23 April 1804 and an admiral on 25 October 1809. (Note: Full dates of flag promotion: rear-admiral of the white 14 February 1799, rear-admiral of the red 1 January 1801, vice-admiral of the blue 23 April 1804, vice-admiral of the red 9 November 1805, admiral of the blue 25 October 1809, admiral of the white 31 July 1810, admiral of the red 12 August 1819.)

== Other work ==
Wilson was politically active in his native Suffolk and supported the parliamentary candidacy of 'Gaffer' Gooch in 1820, which was based on improving agricultural and commercial rights. While Gooch was successful, Wilson was hissed and booed by the crowd for his martial stance against poachers which had previously resulted in a violent attack on his land. He also served the county as a magistrate.

== Death ==
He died on 6 March 1826, at the age of seventy, at his seat Redgrave Hall in Suffolk. Upon his death it was noted that as an officer he was 'generally beloved' throughout the navy.

== Family ==
He married Catherine Pollard of Ewell, Surrey, on 22 August 1801. Together they had four sons and two daughters including:

- George St. Vincent Wilson (1806-1852)
- Susan Mary Wilson (b. 1809)
- John Wood Wilson (1812-1872)

Wilson also had a sister, Lucinda, who married the master mariner William Raven who in turn stood godfather for Wilson's daughter Susan. Wilson's uncle was the politician Rowland Holt and upon the death of Holt's brother Thomas, he inherited the family home of Redgrave Hall.
