= Holystone =

Stones used to scrub wooden ships' decks

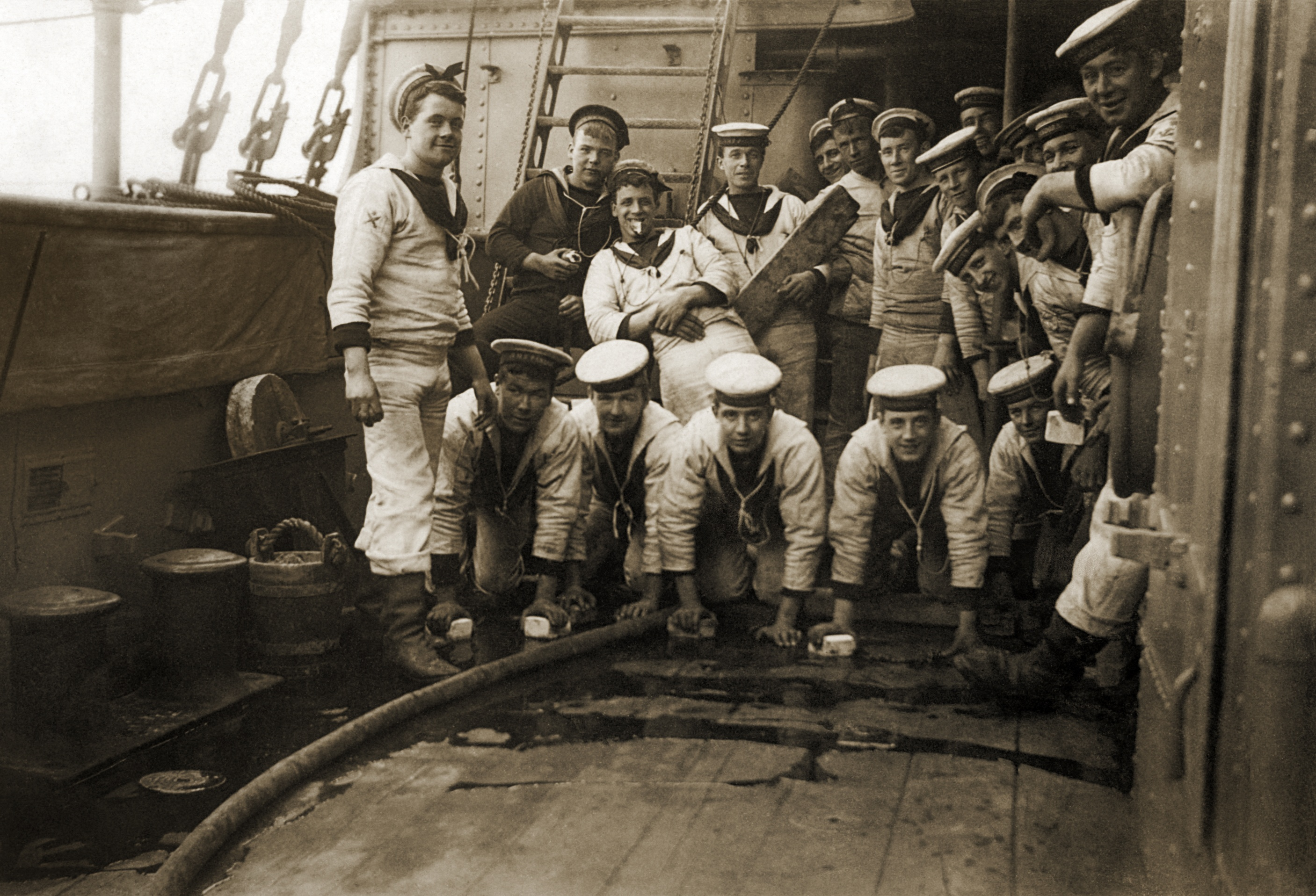
Sailors holystoning the deck of HMS Pandora in the early 20th century

Holystone is a soft and brittle sandstone that was formerly used in the Royal Navy and US Navy for scrubbing and whitening the wooden decks of ships.

A variety of origins have been proposed for the term, including that such stones were taken from broken monuments of St. Nicholas Church in Great Yarmouth or else the ruined church of St. Helens adjacent to the St Helens Road anchorage of the Isle of Wight where ships would often provision. The US Navy has it that the term may have come from the fact that 'holystoning the deck' was originally done on one's knees, as in prayer. Smaller holystones were called "prayer books" and larger ones "Bibles". Holystoning eventually was not generally done on the knees but with a stick resting in a depression in the flat side of the stone and held under the arm and in the hands and moved back and forth with grain on each plank while standing or partially leaning over to put pressure on the stick-driven stone. Holystoning continued on teak-decked Iowa-class battleships into the 1990s.

== Royal Navy ==
We are to holystone the decks from 4 o'clock in the morning until 8.

If a man should rest he is kicked in the face and bleeds on the stone, and afterwards made to wash the stone from the blood and then reported to the captain and flogged for no provocation.

— From a petition of the crew, HMS Eurydice, 24 April 1796

Holystoning was a routine activity on Royal Navy vessels until the early 1800s. The practice reached its height in 1796 when Admiral St Vincent recommended to his captains that the decks of all ships in the fleet be holystoned "every evening as well as morning during the summer months." For a ship of the line, the practice could take up to four hours.

St Vincent's successor, Admiral Keith, rescinded the order in 1801, finding that "the custom of washing the decks of ships of war in all climates in every temperature of the air, and on stated days let the weather be what it may" was so onerous as to be damaging the health and lives of the crews. The practice was subsequently limited to once every seven to fourteen days, interspersed with sweeping.

Holystoning the deck was part of regulations for British-owned Emigration vessels in 1848, "11. Duties of the sweepers to be to clean the ladders, hospitals, and round houses, to sweep the decks after every meal, and to dry-holystone and scrape them after breakfast."

Holystoning continued as part of Navy routine throughout the nineteenth and early twentieth centuries, but was ultimately regarded merely as a means to occupy an otherwise idle crew. Its lack of utility was evidenced in contemporary accounts including an 1875 British Medical Journal advice which warned against having patients "set to useless tasks simply to keep them employed, such as sailors have to do in holystoning the decks."

== United States Navy ==
Holystoning was banned in the US Navy as it wore down the decks too rapidly and caused excessive expense, but the practice may have disappeared slowly. A 1952 graduate of the Naval Academy recalls of his Youngster (sophomore) cruise to England in the summer of 1949 aboard the USS Missouri:

It was with a stick in the depression of what we were told was brick normally used as insulation in the boilers. A group of 30–40 would stand behind an estimated 4–5-inch board and would move the brick back and forth in coordination with the others while the person in charge would establish the cadence, and then command 'shift' when we would all back up one board and repeat the process. As I recall, sea water and sand were used to aid the effort. The result, once finished with a sea water rinse and a sun bleach, was a clean white deck, just in time for our arrival in Portsmouth, England.

A photo on the US Navy's Navsource purports to show Navy Midshipmen holystoning the deck of the same ship in 1951.

Holystoning was still done on occasion into the 1980s onboard oceangoing minesweepers of the US Navy, as they were constructed with wooden hulls and had teak decks on the forecastle and fantail of the ship that would require deep cleaning due to weathering.

== In popular culture ==
Holystoning is referenced in Richard Henry Dana Jr.'s diary, the 1840 classic Two Years Before the Mast, in what he calls the "Philadelphia Catechism":

Six days shalt thou labor and do all thou art able,
And on the seventh—holystone the decks and scrape the cable.

John Huston's 1956 film Moby Dick, and most recently Peter Weir's 2003 film Master and Commander: The Far Side of the World, also show sailors scrubbing the deck with holystones.

John Barth's 1960 novel The Sot-Weed Factor (Chapter 14, Part II: Going to Malden) features the main character and his valet performing "various simple chores like oakum-picking and holystoning" while aboard Captain Tom Pound's ship.

Dan Simmons' novel The Terror mentions that at 4 a.m. "on a ship at sea, the men would be rousted from their hammocks in half an hour to begin holystoning the decks and cleaning everything in sight." In Ridley Scott's 2018 miniseries adaptation (S1E4, Punished As A Boy), Capt Crozier, as a punishment, orders the crew to "holystone the decks."

The folk song The Banks of Newfoundland mentions scrubbing the boat with "holystone and sand."

The book The Olympian Affair by Jim Butcher describes the crew using "soft sandstone" to clean the AMS Predator. The pilot says of a captured ship, "Hell of a big ship, .... But I wouldn't want to holystone it."

== See also ==
- Ship transport

== Bibliography ==
- Lavery, Brian, ed. (1998). Shipboard Life and Organisation, 1731–1815. Vol. 138. Ashgate. ISBN 1840142286.
