= St Mary's Church, Redgrave =

Coordinates: 52.3633°N 1.0197°E

- St Mary the Virgin, Redgrave
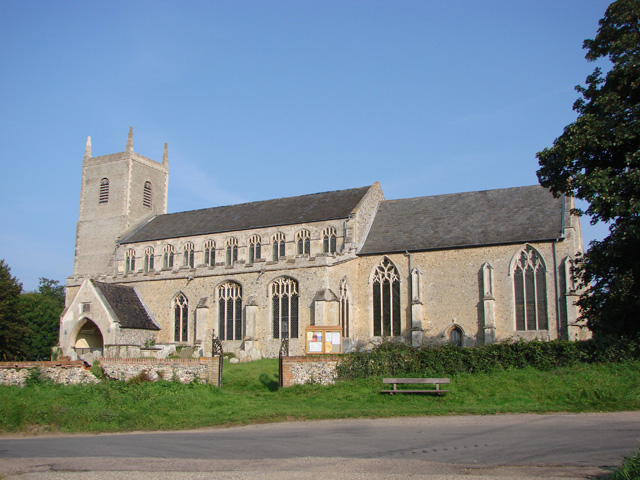
- St Mary's Church, Redgrave, from the south

- Location in Suffolk
- OS grid reference: TM057782
- Location: Redgrave, Suffolk
- Country: England
- Denomination: Church of England
- Website: Churches Conservation Trust

Architecture
- Functional status: redundant
- Heritage designation: Grade I listed
- Designated: 29 July 1955
- Architectural type: Church
- Style: Perpendicular Gothic

Specifications
- Materials: Flint with ashlar dressings, and some brick

St Mary's Church is the redundant Church of England parish church of the village of Redgrave, Suffolk, England. It is a Grade I listed building. and is under the care of the Churches Conservation Trust. The church is on a rise about 3/4 mile (1 km) east of the village.

== Early history ==
The initial building of the church was between about 1280 and 1350. Alterations and additions were made in the 15th century, and the vestry was added in the later part of the following century. The 16th-century tower was refaced in the late 18th century. Repairs were carried out in 1850, and further alterations were made later that century and in the 20th century. In 1506 the rector of the church was Cardinal Wolsey, later to be Lord Chancellor to Henry VIII.

== Architecture ==
=== Exterior ===
The church is constructed in flint rubble with ashlar dressings. There is also some flushwork and red brick. Parts of the walls are rendered. The vestry and the tower are in red brick. The tower has ashlar dressings, and has been refaced with white brick. The roofs of the aisles are covered in lead, while the rest of the church is slated. St Mary's is a large church, its plan consisting of a nave with a clerestory, north and south aisles, a south porch, a chancel with a north vestry, and a west tower. Its main architectural style is Decorated. The tower is tall and is in two stages; it stands on a plinth and is unbutressed. In the bottom stage is a round-headed west doorway. There is a small round-headed window in the second stage on the west side, and a similar window in the third stage on the north. The top stage contains round-headed louvred bell openings on all sides. The parapet is plain, and there are stepped pinnacles on the corners. To the north of the tower is a two-stage stair turret.

Along the clerestory are ten two-light windows on each side. The parapet of the south aisle is battlemented and has gargoyles. The porch is to the west of the centre of the south aisle. The porch leads to the entrance doorway to the church. This dates from the 14th century, and is elaborately carved. To the east of the porch is a 14th-century two-light window. Further east are two three-light Perpendicular windows. In the west wall of the aisle is a two-light window, and in its east wall is a three-light window, both of these dating from the 14th century. The north aisle has a plain parapet, and its north wall contains a blocked door, two 14th-century two-light windows, a large three-light 16th-century Perpendicular window, and a three-light 17th-century window containing lancets in a square surround. At the west end of the aisle is a two-light 14th-century window, and at the east end is a three-light 15th-century Perpendicular window. In the chancel is a large 14th-century seven-light east window with complex tracery. On the south side of the chancel is a low door flanked by two tall 14th-century three-light windows. There are two similar windows on the north side. The vestry is constructed in English bond brickwork on a plinth. On its north side is an oval window, and to the east is a three-light 18th-century window.

=== Interior ===
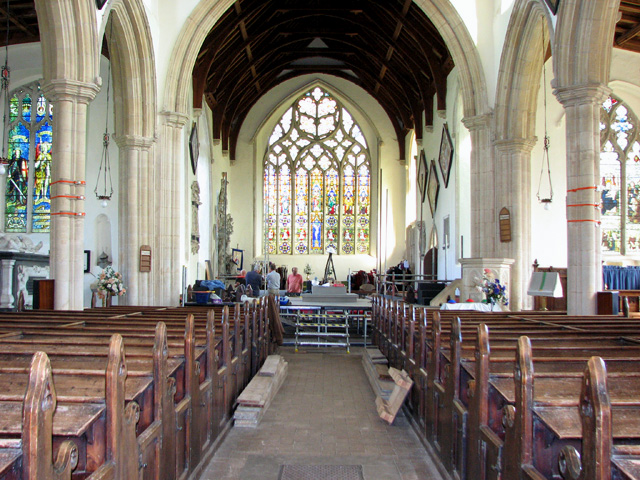
Interior looking east

Inside the church are tall five-bay arcades with pointed arches carried on quatrefoil piers. The hammerbeam roof in the nave dates from the 15th century, and is in ten bays. The chancel roof dates from the 19th century, and has six bays. The 16th-century vestry roof has a large central pendant. In the south wall of the chancel is a piscina and an elaborate triple sedilia. The sedilia is in Perpendicular style, and has canted canopies with lierne vaulting. There is another piscina in the south aisle. The north aisle contains a 14th-century octagonal font. On the wall of the aisle is a re-set section of a reredos dated 1709, an 18th-century painting of the Holy Family, and elaborately decorated boards inscribed with the Ten Commandments. The Commandments occupy two central panels, and are flanked by panels containing paintings of Moses and Aaron. On the floor beneath these objects is a long school desk carved with graffiti, and a 19th-century bier. Over the south doorway are the Royal Arms of Charles II in an oval frame. In the nave is a 15th-century iron-bound chest. The seating, the Gothic-style pulpit and the brass lectern all date from the 19th century. The stained glass in the east window is by T. Farrow of Diss, and is dated 1853. The glass in the aisles is from a later date.

The three-manual organ is at the west end of the church. It was made in 1889 by the Casson Patent Organ Company, and restored in 2007 by Rodney Briscoe.

The west tower has a ring of six bells. Thomas Newman of Norwich cast a ring of five in 1736. Thomas Osborn of St Neots cast an additional treble bell in 1785, increasing the ring to six.

The church contains a "fine collection of hatchments and monuments of national importance"; these are mainly to members of the Bacon, Holt and Wilson families. There are thirteen hatchments, more than any other church in Suffolk. At the east end of the north aisle is a chest tomb in black and white marble with the effigies of Sir Nicholas Bacon who died in 1624, and his wife Anne Butts. It was made in 1616 by Nicholas Stone. Near to this is a wall tablet to R. Bacon who died in 1652. The west end of the north aisle, which contains four black and white marble wall tablets, was formerly the family chapel of the Bacon family; this was also designed by Nicholas Stone. On the north wall of the chancel is a large monument to Sir John Holt, Lord Chief Justice who died in 1710. It is in white, grey and white marble, with some gilt and was made by Thomas Green. In the centre of the monument is the seated effigy of a judge, flanked by statues representing personifications of Justice and Vigilance, all contained in an elaborately carved aedicule. Also on the north wall is a tablet to the children of E. Bacon that was erected in 1660. On the south wall is a black and white tablet to Lady Gawdy, who died in 1621, by Nicholas Stone, and a simple tablet to the children of another E. Bacon dated 1683. In the chancel floor is a brass to Anne Butts, who died in 1609, with a poem inscribed below her figure. There are also floor slabs from the 17th and 18th centuries to former rectors. The hatchments are in the chancel, the nave, and the north aisle.

== Recent history and present day ==
The church was declared redundant on 1 April 2004. Following vesting in the Churches Conservation Trust, repairs and restoration were undertaken. The first phase involved repairs to the exterior, which were completed in September 2006. The second phase involved re-plastering and limewashing of the interior, repairing the fittings, cleaning and consolidating the memorials, and conserving the hatchments. In 2005 the local residents formed the Redgrave Church Heritage Trust and the two trusts have worked together. A toilet block has been installed in the base of the tower, and a kitchenette on the southwest corner of the church. The church has been transformed into a community venue. Services are still held in the church, and it is also used for concerts, plays, and other events.

In 2010 the entrance to a burial vault below the church was accidentally discovered. This occurred during a rehearsal in the church for the musical Quasimodo when an actress, Kathy Mills, dislodged a marble flagstone near the altar. Below this was the entrance to the vault. It led by a set of steps into a tunnel, with a chamber containing coffins. In February 2011 the vault was opened for inspection by the general public for a number of hours. The entrance has since been sealed.

== External features ==
In the churchyard are three memorials, all designated as Grade II listed buildings. To the south of the church is a pair of similar chest tombs to members of the Cay family dating from the early 19th century. Also south of the church is the chest tomb of R. Symonds dated 1766. To the northwest of the church is a pair of chest tombs to members of the Birch and Billingform families.

== See also ==
- List of churches preserved by the Churches Conservation Trust in the East of England
