= Thomas Green (sculptor) =

17th and 18th century British sculptor

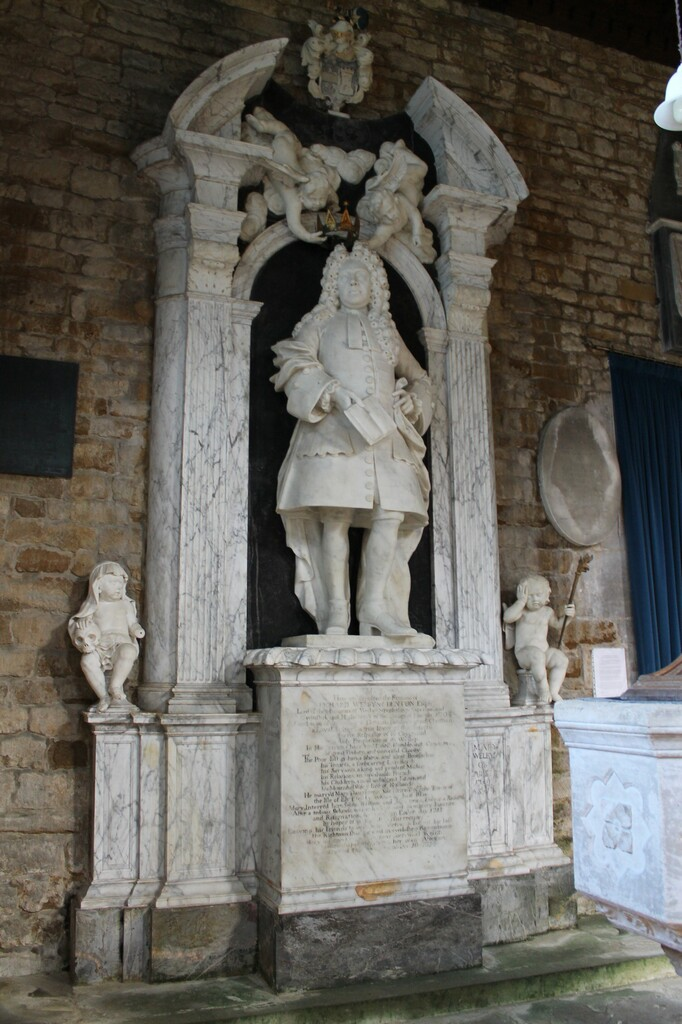
Memorial to Richard Welby, Denton church in Lincolnshire

Thomas Green of Camberwell (c. 1659–1730) was a British sculptor and master mason who was prominent during the first quarter of the 18th century.

== Life ==
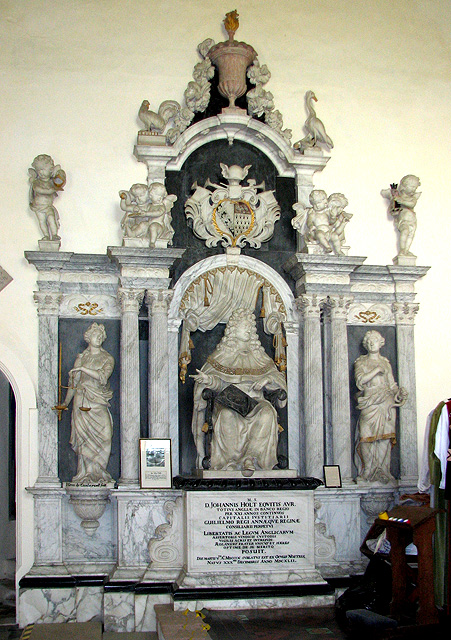
Monument by Thomas Green to Sir John Holt in Redgrave Church, Suffolk

He was born in or near London in 1659 or 1660. He trained as a stonemason being first apprenticed to John Fitch in 1673, transferring to William Hind and becoming a Freeman of the Worshipful Company of Masons in 1681. In 1694 he was working under Thomas Cartwright the Elder then under William Holland before obtaining his own yard and company in Camberwell in 1697.

He specialised in Coats of Arms commissioned by the government (a fashion of the early 18th century) and grave monuments incorporating statues.

He died in Camberwell around 1730.

== Main projects ==
- Monument to Richard Earle, 4th Baronet at Stragglethorpe (c. 1700)
- Monument to Richard Welby at Denton, Lincolnshire (1705)
- Huge memorial to Lord Justice Holt (1711)
- Monument to William Chew at Dunstable (1712)
- Monument to George Courthope at Ticehurst (1714)
- Memorial to Judge John Powell (1645–1713) in Gloucester Cathedral (1714)
- Monument to Sir Henry Furnese, 1st Baronet at Waldershare Church (1714)
- Monument to Sir Peter Seaman at St Gregory's Church, Norwich (1715)
- Monument to Maynard Colchester at Westbury, Gloucestershire (1715)
- Monument to Thomas Hall at St George Colgate in Norwich (1715)
- Coat of Arms at Woolwich Royal Brass Foundry (1717)
- Coat of Arms at Chatham Dockyards (1717)
- Coat of Arms on the Tower of London (1717)
- Coat of Arms at new Storehouse in Portsmouth Docks (1718) destroyed in the Blitz
- Coat of Arms at the Gun Wharf in Portsmouth (1718) destroyed in the Blitz
- Memorial to Bishop Richard Cumberland in Peterborough Cathedral (1718)

=== Gallery ===
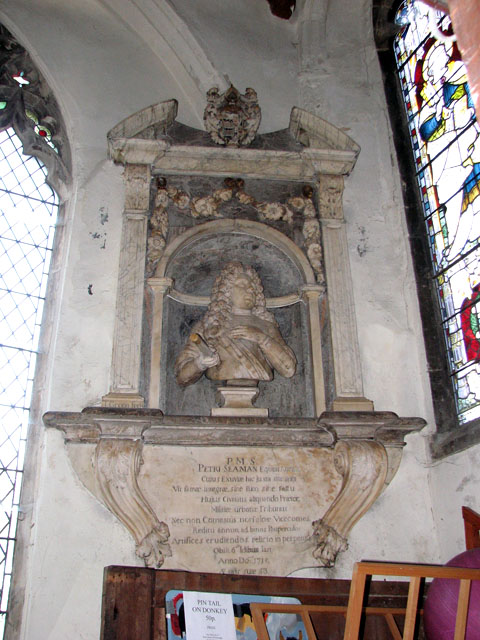
Monument to Sir Peter Seaman at St Gregory's Church Pottergate, Norwich

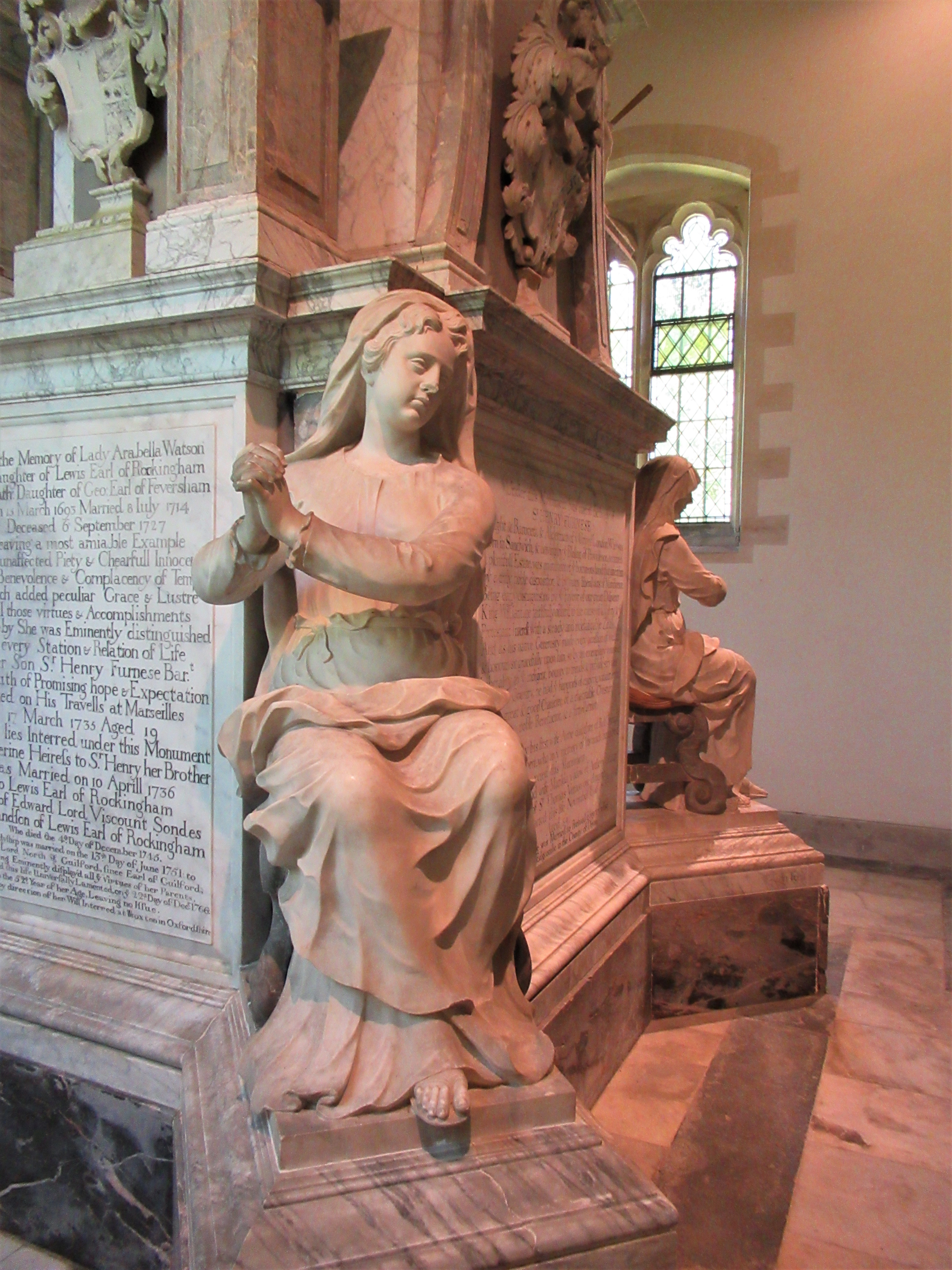
Furness monument, All Saints, Waldershare (detail)

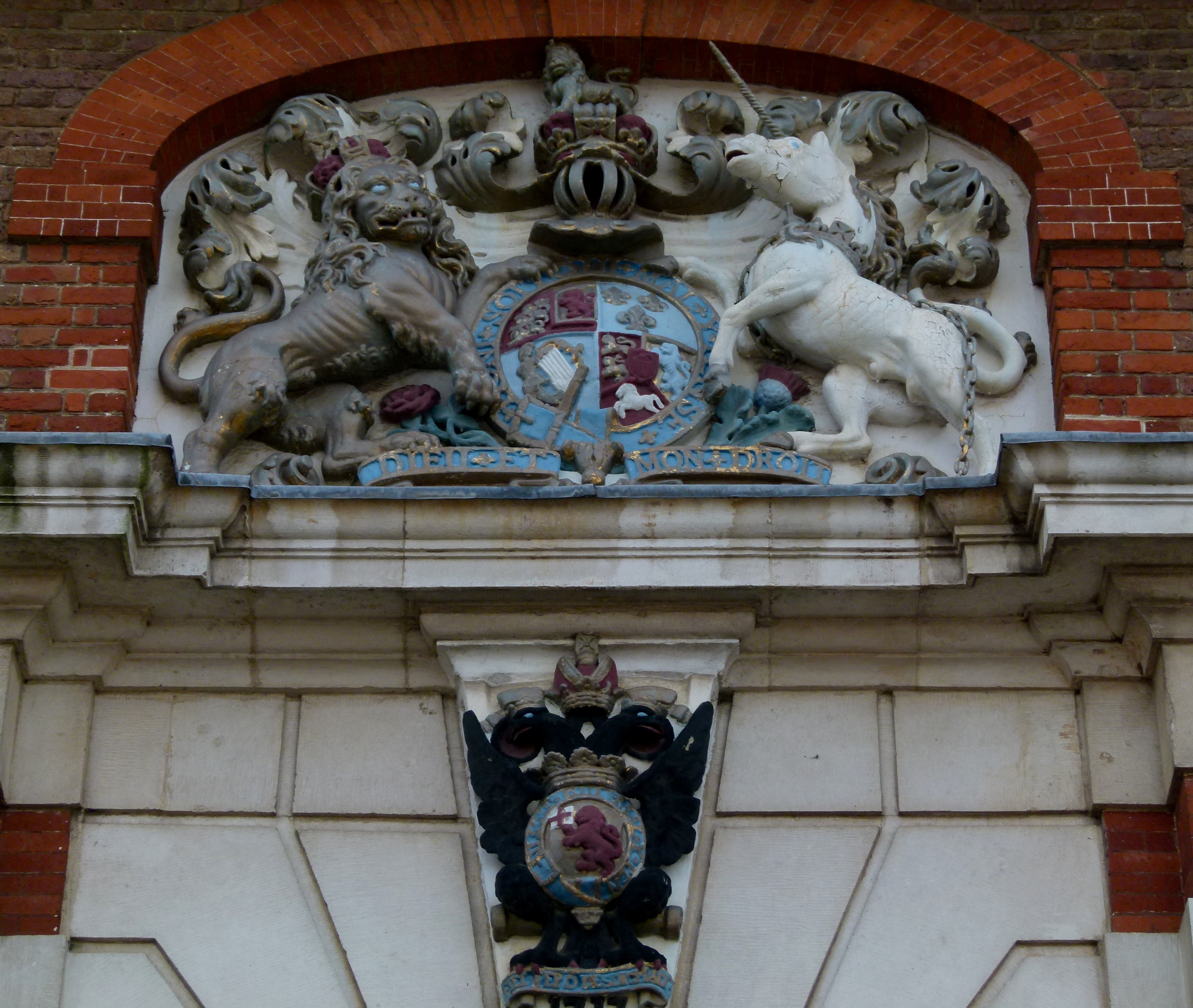
Coat of Arms at Woolwich Royal Brass Foundry

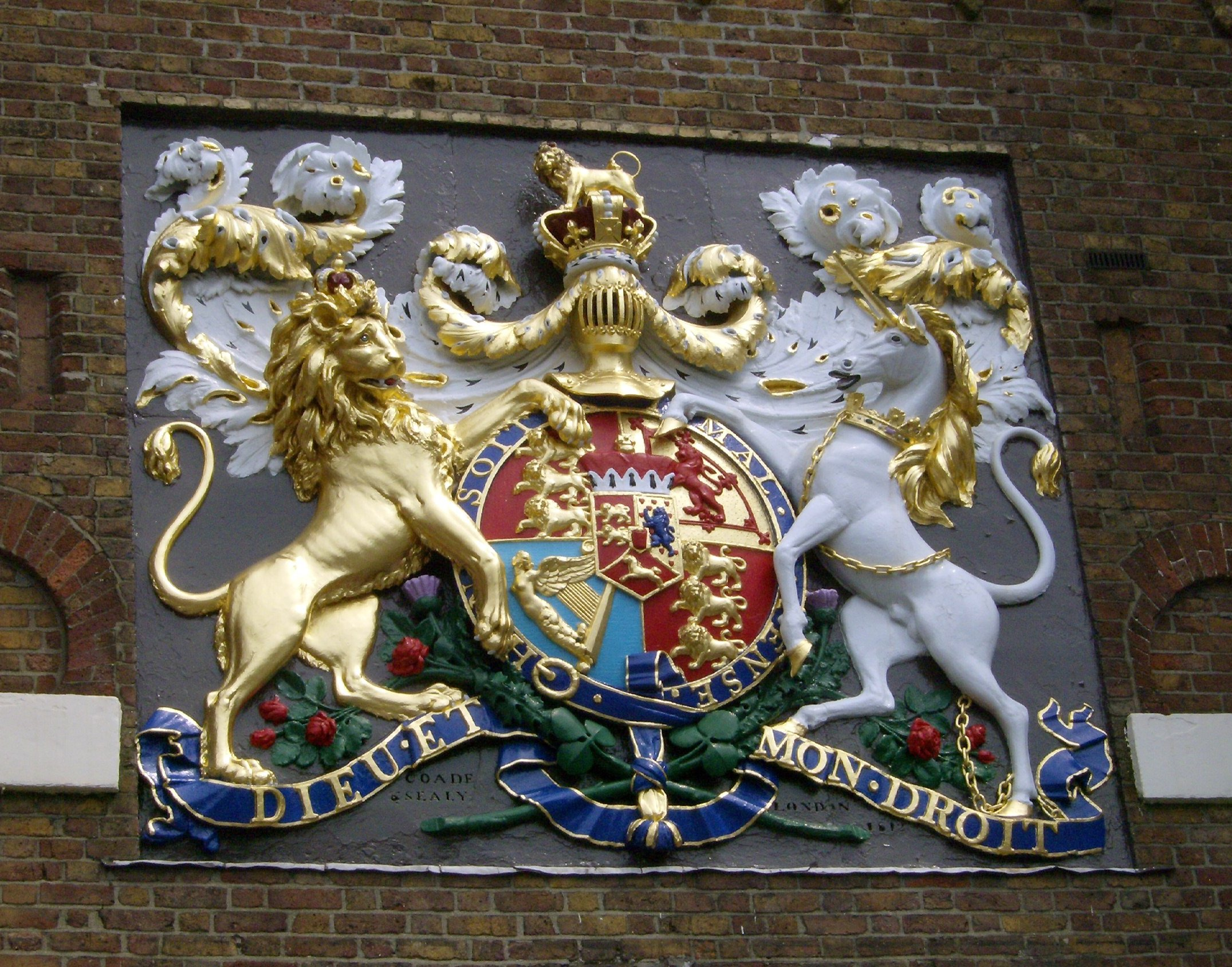
Coat of Arms at Chatham Royal Dockyard

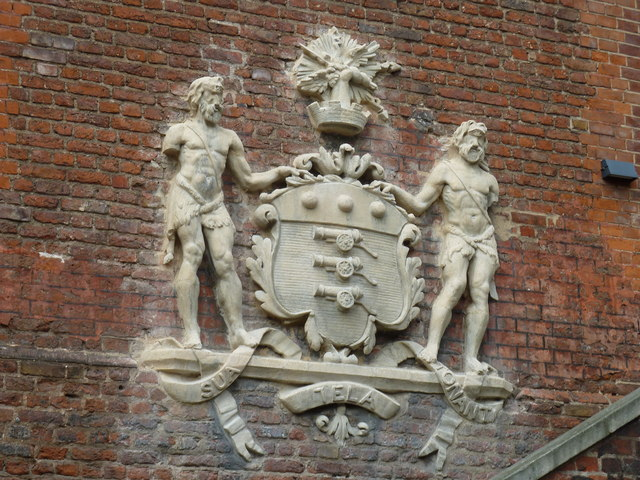
Coat of the arms on the Tower of London

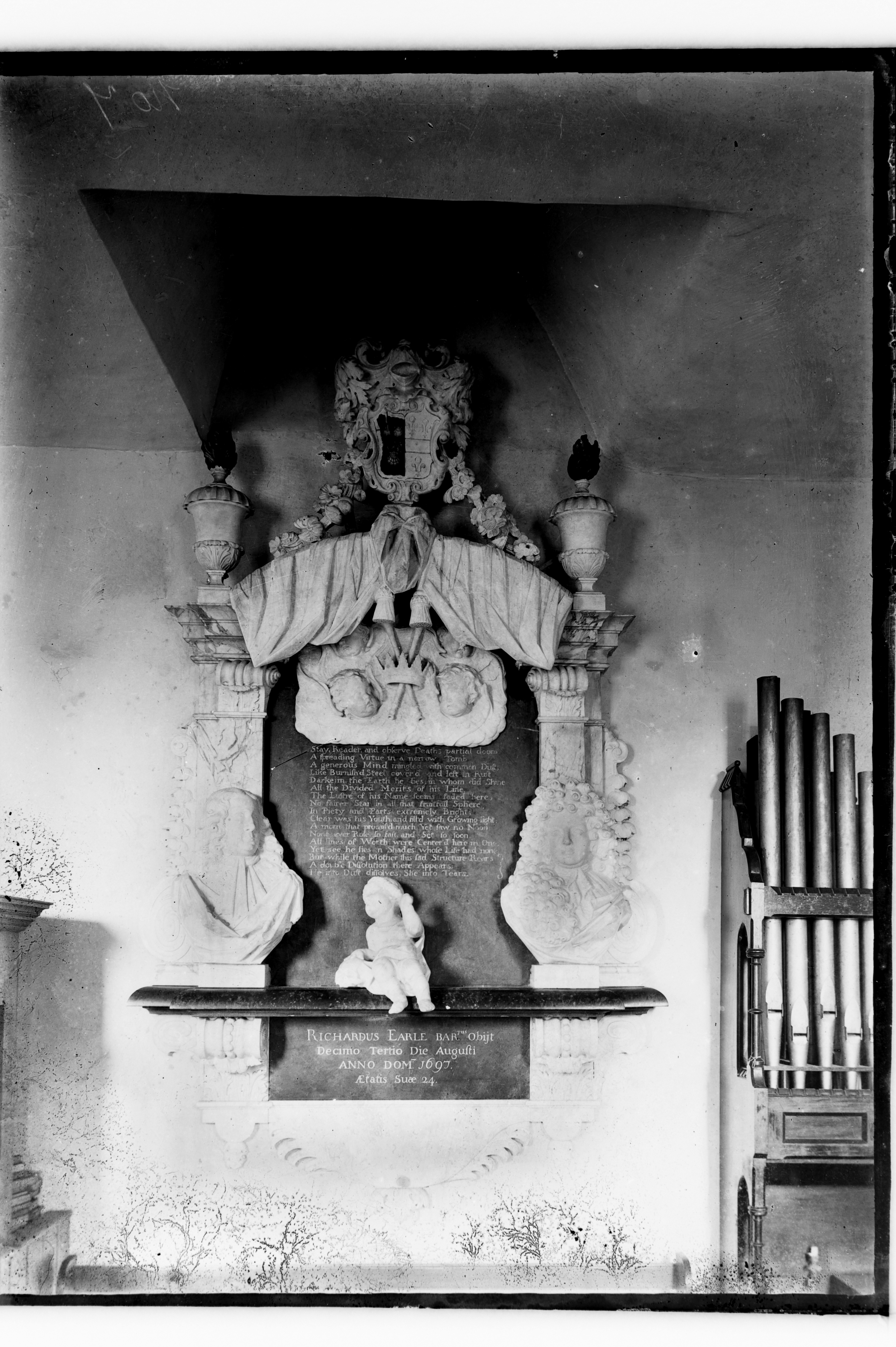
Monument to Sir Richard Earle at Stragglethorpe
