= Redgrave, Suffolk =

Village in Suffolk, England

Coordinates: 52.361015°N 1.002030°E

Redgrave
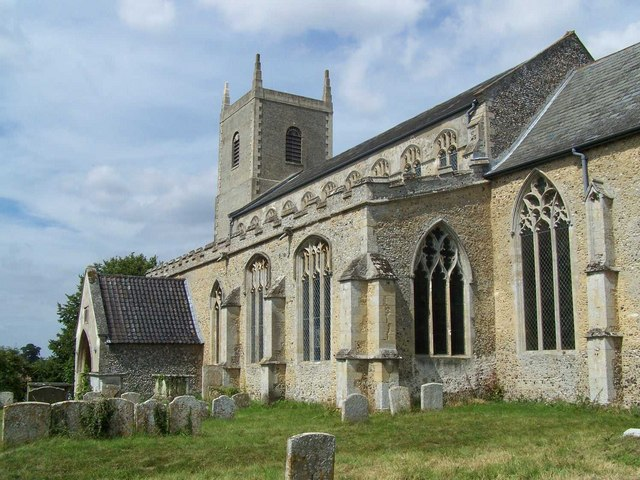
- Parish church of St Mary the Virgin

- Location within Suffolk
- Population: 459 (2011 census)
- OS grid reference: TM0478
- Civil parish: Redgrave
- District: Mid Suffolk
- Shire county: Suffolk
- Region: East
- Country: England
- Sovereign state: United Kingdom
- Post town: DISS
- Postcode district: IP22
- Dialling code: 01379
- UK Parliament: Waveney Valley

Redgrave is a village and civil parish in Suffolk, England, just south of the River Waveney that here forms the county boundary with Norfolk. The village is about 4 1/2 miles (7 km) west of the town of Diss. The 2011 census recorded the parish population as 459.

Redgrave is in the Rickinghall and Walsham ward of Mid Suffolk District.

The village of Redgrave is the descendant of the historic Redgrave Manor (Redgrave Park) which contained Redgrave Hall and currently contains Redgrave Park Farm.

== History ==
In 1870–72, John Marius Wilson's Imperial Gazetteer of England and Wales described Redgrave thus:

"REDGRAVE, a village and a parish in Hartismere district, Suffolk. The village stands near the river Waveney at the boundary with Norfolk, 4¼ miles NW of Mellis [rail] station, and 7 WNW of Eye; and has a post-office under Scole. The parish contains also the hamlet of Botesdale, and comprises 3,353 acres (13.57 km^{2}). Real property, £7,722. Population in 1851, 1,382; in 1861, 1,266. Houses, 299. The [Redgrave] manor was given, by Ulfketel the Dane, to [the Bury St. Edmunds Abbey]; passed to Lord Keeper Bacon, Chief Justice Holt, and others; and, with Redgrave Hall, belongs now to G. H. Wilson, Esq. [Redgrave Hall] occupies the site of a residence of the Abbots of Bury; was rebuilt in 1770; and has a very fine park. Limetree House is the seat of J. R. Whit-hair, Esq. The living is a rectory, united with the chapelry of Botesdale, in the diocese of Norwich. Value, £889.* Patron, G. H. Wilson, Esq. The church was restored in 1850. There are a Wesleyan chapel, a national school, an endowed grammar school with £28 a year, and charities £21. Cardinal Wolsey was rector."

== Redgrave Manor/Park/Hall ==
=== Before 1542 (Bury Abbey) ===
According to the Domesday Book completed in 1086, the Redgrave Manor was given to the Bury St. Edmunds Abbey by Ulfcytel Snillingr, the Earl of East Anglia. He was a leader of local resistance against the invading Danish armies in 1004 and 1010.) By 1211, Abbot Samson of Bury St Edmunds had built a hunting lodge (or Hall) and deer-park (a deer hunting ground enclosed by fence or ditch) which soon included a stable, dairy, chicken house, dove house, goose house, orchard, kitchen, bake house, chapel, and guest house. Redgrave Church was added in the early 14th century. In 1539 King Henry VIII dissolved the monasteries and Redgrave Manor and Park passed into the hands of the King.

=== 1542 – 1702 (Bacons) ===
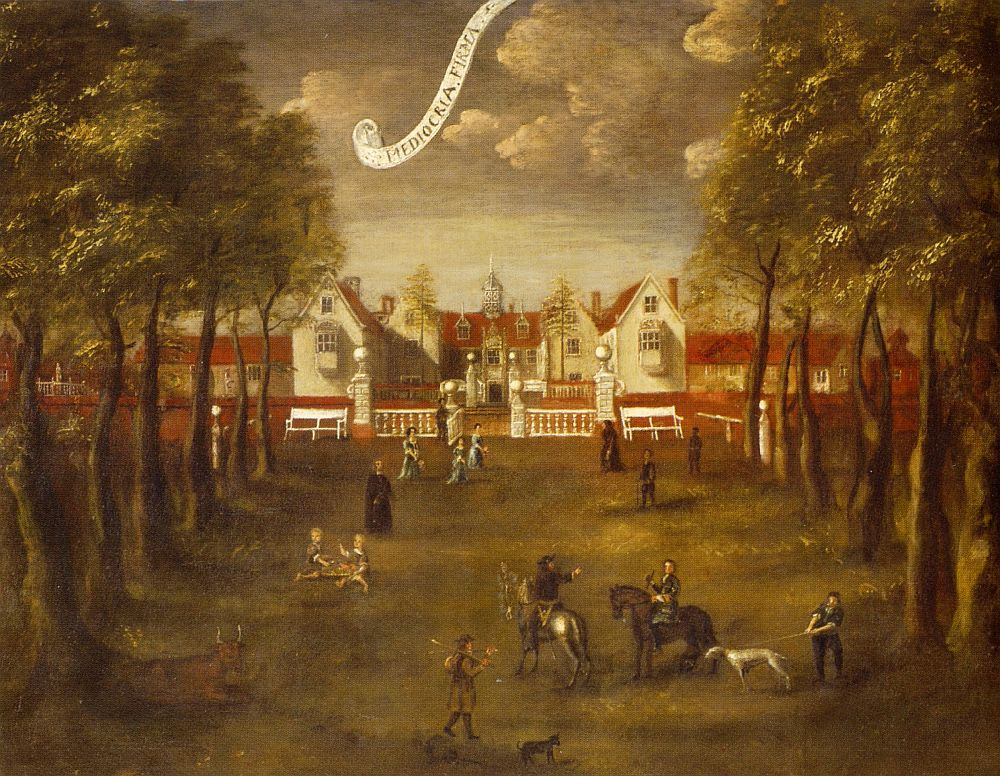
The Bacon family in front of Redgrave Hall, c.1676

In 1542 three years after the property had been seized by Henry VIII, Nicholas Bacon (father of philosopher/statesman Sir Francis Bacon) bought Redgrave Manor from the Crown. The Bacon family had possession of the property for the next 160 years. Nicholas Bacon rebuilt the Hall and made some alterations to the Park and the gardens, employing a London mason William Cure the Elder to build a fountain in 1568. A statue of a male water-bearer in Elizabethan dress may date from this period. Robert Bacon, the 5th baronet, sold the Redgrave Estate in 1702 to John Holt, the Lord Chief Justice.

=== 1702 – 1799 (Holts) ===
In 1702 Robert Bacon sold the Redgrave Hall Estate to John Holt who was the Lord Chief Justice of England and Wales from 17 April 1689 to 11 March 1710. After John Holt, his brother Rowland Holt was Squire of Redgrave, followed by his son, Rowland II, followed by his 16-year-old son Rowland III who remodelled the Hall and Park in the 1760s adding a sinuous, 50-acre (20 ha) lake, "a Palladian 'rotunda' or round house in one corner of the Park, and a 'water house' (later known as the Kennels) beside the Lake. A decorative Orangery and a red brick stable block were built near the Hall. [...] He owned a house in London, at 47 Pall Mall. When he died unmarried in 1786 the Estate passed to his brother Thomas. Thomas Holt was Squire of Redgrave until his death in 1799, when the Estate passed to his nephew George Wilson, eldest son of his sister Lucinda, who had married Thomas Wilson in 1752. Thus the Estate passed into the Wilson family."

=== 1799 – 1971 (Wilsons) ===
In 1799, Thomas Holt's nephew Captain George Wilson (later Admiral of the Red) inherited the Redgrave Estate. Admiral Wilson's eldest son, George St Vincent (1806–1852) inherited what King William IV called "the most beautiful combination of land and water in Eastern England".

"George St V.'s youngest brother John Wood Wilson (1812–1872) worked hard to put the management of the Estate on a sounder footing, and to invest in farm improvements. [...] In 1898 financial problems forced George Holt Wilson to move out of Redgrave Hall, and he took up residence at Broom Hills house, Rickinghall. He was the last of the Wilsons to live at the Hall. [...] In the First World War troops were billeted in the Park. Between 1919 and 1921 George Holt Wilson sold most of the contents of the Muniment Room at the Hall. This was a room on the ground floor which contained Estate and manorial records and legal documents relating to the successive owners of the Estate dating back to the Middle Ages. The bulk of the early material went to the University of Chicago, where it forms a uniquely important collection of documents for studying Mediaeval and Tudor history. [...] In 1924 George Holt Wilson died, and his son George Rowland died in 1928. The Estate therefore had to pay two lots of death duties tax in four years. This set the scene for the climate of financial stringency facing John Holt Wilson (1900–1963) when he took over running the Estate. For a few years in the 1930s John Holt Wilson was able to let the Hall as a hotel and country club. [After World War II he] decided to demolish the Hall to raise money to plough into the Estate. The interior features – fireplaces, ceilings, staircases – were sold, and then the house itself was taken down brick by brick."

=== 1971 – present (Tophams) ===
In 1971 Redgrave Park was sold out of the Holt-Wilson family to Guy and Elizabeth Topham who turned it into a farm. Of the buildings erected by Brown, only the Roundhouse and the Kennels survive, and are subject to a Grade Two preservation order by the Government to keep them for posterity.

== H5N1 outbreak in Redgrave, 2007 ==
In November 2007, the highly pathogenic avian influenza subtype H5N1 strain that is considered a flu pandemic threat was discovered at several Redgrave Poultry farms near Diss, Norfolk; including at Redgrave Park where free range turkeys (with access to housing at night) are farmed. DEFRA killed tens of thousands of poultry to stop the spread of this outbreak of H5N1.

== Other notable people ==
- Thomas Fowle, 16th century rector.

== See also ==
- 2007 Bernard Matthews H5N1 outbreak
