= HMS Eurydice (1781) =

History

Great Britain
- Name: HMS Eurydice
- Ordered: 24 July 1776
- Builder: Portsmouth Dockyard
- Laid down: February 1777
- Launched: 26 March 1781
- Completed: 3 June 1781
- Honours and awards: Naval General Service Medal with clasp "Martinique"
- Fate: Broken up in March 1834

General characteristics
- Class & type: 24-gun Porcupine-class post ship
- Tons burthen: 521.3 (bm)
- Length: 114 ft 3 in (34.82 m) (overall); 94 ft 2 3/4 in (28.721 m) (keel)
- Beam: 32 ft 3 in (9.83 m)
- Draught: 7 ft 4 in (2.24 m); 11 ft (3.4 m)
- Depth of hold: 10 ft 3 in (3.12 m)
- Sail plan: Full-rigged ship
- Complement: 160 (140 by 1815)
- Armament: As built: Upper deck (UD): 22 × 9-pounder guns; QD: 2 × 6-pounder bow chasers; By 1815: UD: 14 × 9-pounder guns + 8 × 18-pounder carronades; QD: 2 × 6-pounder guns

HMS Eurydice was a 24-gun Porcupine-class post ship of the Royal Navy built in 1781 and broken up in 1834. During her long career she saw service in the American War of Independence, the French Revolutionary Wars and the Napoleonic Wars. She captured a number of enemy privateers and served in the East and West Indies, the Mediterranean and British and American waters.

== Construction and commissioning ==
Eurydice was ordered from Portsmouth Dockyard on 24 July 1776, and was laid down in February 1777. She was initially worked on by Master Shipwright Nicholas Phillips until April 1779, and then by George White. She was launched on 26 March 1781 and completed for service on 3 June 1781. She had cost £12,391.4.0d to build, this sum including fitting and coppering. She was commissioned under her first captain, George Wilson, in March 1781.

== Career ==
=== American War of Independence ===
Wilson sailed initially to the Leeward Islands, arriving in Frigate Bay, St Kitts on either 25 or 26 January 1782. Eurydice was present at the Battle of the Saintes on 12 April 1782, and then returned to Britain carrying the dispatches.

She came under the command of Captain George Courtnay in April 1782, under whom she served in the English Channel and off the Channel Islands. She joined John Elliot’s squadron in Autumn 1782 and on 14 October 1782 she captured the French Amis off Île de Batz.

Eurydice was paid off between 1782 and 1783 but recommissioned in April 1783. An 18-year-old Fletcher Christian, later to be the instigator of the mutiny on the Bounty, signed on aboard HMS Eurydice on 25 April 1783 at Spithead. She was the first Royal Navy ship that Christian signed on to.

Eurydice's next posting was to the East Indies, to which she sailed on 10 April 1783. On 24 May 1784, in Madras, Christian was promoted to acting lieutenant and watch leader.

Eurydice returned to Britain and was again paid off in July 1785, and spent between January and April 1786 undergoing a small repair at Woolwich Dockyard at a cost of £2,290. She was fitted for sea at Woolwich at a cost of £3,386 between May and July 1788, during which she was recommissioned in June 1788 under Captain George Lumsdaine.

=== French Revolutionary Wars ===
Lumsdaine sailed for service in the Mediterranean on 27 November 1788. With war with Revolutionary France looming, she was fitted out by Wells & Co for £1,856 between February and March 1793, and then at Woolwich for a further £3,507 between March and June 1793. Eurydice was then recommissioned under Captain Francis Cole in April 1793.

"We are to holystone the decks from 4 o'clock in the morning until 8.

If a man should rest he is kicked in the face and bleeds on the stone, and afterwards made to wash the stone from the blood and then reported to the captain and flogged for no provocation ...

Mr Colvile our First Lieutenant and Mr McCloud our master's mate are beyond description and so tyrannical that such officers are a disgrace to the service.

We wish to have them discharged from the ship."

— From a unanimous petition of the crew, HMS Eurydice, 24 April 1796

On 8 June 1794, Eurydice, along with the 36-gun Crescent, the 32-gun Druid, and six smaller vessels, all under the command of Sir James Saumarez were sent from Plymouth to reconnoitre the French coast. Off the north-west coast of Guernsey they encountered the two 50-gun French razees – Scévola and Brutus – the two 36-gun frigates Danaé and Félicité, and a 14-gun brig. Saumarez ordered Eurydice, his slowest ship, into port to avoid her capture and then lured the French ships into range of Guernsey's shore-based guns. He then turned across the line of the French ships and through a narrow passage between the rocks, which enabled him to escape. A memorial plaque at Castle Cornet in St. Peter Port, Guernsey, depicts the encounter.

Eurydice was at Plymouth on 20 January 1795 and so shared in the proceeds of the detention of the Dutch naval vessels, East Indiamen, and other merchant vessels that were in port on the outbreak of war between Britain and the Netherlands.

Eurydice came under the command of Captain Thomas Twysden in 1795, with Twysden being succeeded by Captain Richard Bennet in 1796. During this time she operated on convoy and cruising duties. Harsh treatment of the crew led to considerable unhappiness aboard the ship. On 24 April the crew unanimously put their names to a petition to Admiralty, accusing the first lieutenant and the master's mate of conduct "so tyrannical that such officers are a disgrace to the service."

Admiralty convened a court martial to try the sailor suspected of drafting the petition, but he was acquitted as there was insufficient evidence that it was in his handwriting. No charges were laid against the officers of the ship, but Captain Bennett was removed from his command and the ship placed in ordinary until a replacement was found.

=== Return to service ===
Eurydice was recommissioned in August 1796 under Captain John Talbot and was deployed in the North Sea. She captured the French privateer Sphinx on 15 December 1796, the 14-gun Flibustier on 6 February 1797 and Voligeur on 7 March. The next day she was in sight, as were Fairy and hired armed cutter Grace, when Racoon captured the galiot Concordia.

On the morning of 10 November 1799 Eurydice was some 9 miles south-east of Beachy Head, when she sighted a schooner and a brig. The schooner made off as soon as she saw the ship and the brig hove to and hoisted her ensign upside down. She reported that she had been attacked by the schooner and that one of her men was badly wounded. Talbot sent his surgeon, Mr Price, on board the brig and made sail after the privateer. The sloop Snake joined in the chase later in the morning. Halfway through the afternoon Eurydice came nearly within gunshot of the privateer which bore up and tried to cross Snake. When this manoeuvre failed, the vessel lowered her sails and surrendered. She was the Hirondelle of Calais, commanded by Pierre Merie Dugerdin with a crew of 50 men, one of whom was found to be an Englishman. She was armed with fourteen 3- and 4-pounders and had sailed on the Saturday morning. The brig Eurydice had recaptured was the collier Diana, from Sunderland bound for Portsmouth. Her wounded man was brought on board Eurydice, where the surgeon had to remove an arm.

On 29 April 1800 the gun-vessel Assault recaptured the brig Adventure, of London, while Eurydice and Childers were in sight.

Eurydice was refitted at Portsmouth and in January 1801 came under the command of Captain Walter Bathurst. Bathurst captured the privateer Bougainville, of Saint Malo, in the Atlantic on 8 May 1801. She was under the command of Jaques le Bon, had a crew of 67 men, and was armed with 14 guns of different calibre. She was out three days and had made no captures.

Eurydice sailed for the East Indies on 20 October 1801.

After her return to Britain she was refitted in 1803, and commissioned in September 1803 under Captain John Nicholas. Under Nicolas she escorted a convoy to Quebec, departing Britain on 16 May 1804.

== Napoleonic Wars ==
Captain William Hoste took command in November 1804, and Eurydice served under him in the Mediterranean throughout 1805.

On 14 November 1804 Eurydice was in company with HMS Bittern when they recaptured the hired armed ship Lord Eldon and sent her into Gibraltar. Spanish gunboats had captured her off Algeciras two days earlier. (Note: Although the London Gazette gives the date of recapture as 14 November 1805, the news item from Lloyd's List makes it clear that the recapture took place in November 1804, so most probably 14 November 1804.)

Eurydice shared with Merlin and Prevoyante in the proceeds from the capture on 11 June 1805 of the Prussian ship Edward. The proceeds were forwarded from Gibraltar. Eurydice captured the 6-gun privateer Mestuo La Solidade on 6 October, before passing under the command of Captain Sir William Bolton in December that year. Eurydice spent 1806 and 1807 in the Channel, before acting-Captain David Ramsey took over in August 1808.

She was later under Captain James Bradshaw and was present at the capture of Martinique in February 1809. In 1847 the Admiralty authorised the clasp "Martinique" to the Naval General Service Medal to all surviving participants in that campaign.

Eurydice spent 1809 to 1811 on the North American Station, undertaking a number of cruises out of Halifax, Nova Scotia, in company with the ships at the station. (Note: Diaries kept by a local merchant, John Liddel, indicate some cruises undertaken by HMS Eurydice during her time at Nova Scotia in 1810: 16 June HMS Eurydice, accompanied by HMS Indian (18 guns) sailed from Halifax.; 1 September HMS Eurydice & accompanied by HMS Indian returned from Fayal.; 16 September HMS Halifax (sloop-of-war) and HMS Eurydice go on a cruise.; 4 November HMS Halifax and HMS Eurydice come in.; 28 November HMS Eurydice and HMS Indian go on a cruise.) She then returned to Britain and spent 1812 to 1814 in ordinary at Deptford. She underwent a temporary repair at Deptford between September 1813 and June 1814; and was subsequently fitted for sea there between August and October 1814.

== Post-war and fate ==
Eurydice was recommissioned in August 1814 under Captain Valentine Gardner and by June 1815 was under Captain Robert Spencer and serving on the Irish Station. Her final seagoing service was off St Helena under Captain Robert Wauchope, who took command in April 1816.

In February 1818 the merchantman Atlas, Joseph Short, master, was sailing from Dundee when she encountered a Portuguese brig with 360 slaves from Mozambique. Atlas sent the brig into the Cape of Good Hope where Eurydice detained the brig.

On 8 January 1819, two seamen on Hibernia behaved in a mutinous manner as she transported convicts from England to Van Diemen's Land. The rest of the crew objected to the men being put in irons, but eventually all but two others returned to their duties. When Hibernia reached Rio de Janeiro, Lennon asked Captain Wauchope for assistance. Eventually 12 men from Hibernia joined Eurydice's crew; Wauchope sent only three men in return. The resulting crew shortage on Hibernia delayed her sailing.

Eurydice was laid up at Deptford in December 1819 but moved in 1821 to Woolwich. She was fitted as a receiving ship there between August 1823 and January 1824, spending the rest of her career in this role. She was finally broken up at Deptford in March 1834.
