= HMS Gaspée (1773) =

Brig of the Royal Navy

History

Great Britain
- Name: HMS Gaspée
- Acquired: By purchase 1772
- Commissioned: January 1773
- Captured: November 1775
- Fate: Recaptured 1776 and sold, possibly in 1777

General characteristics
- Tons burthen: 7754/94 (by calc.), or 102 (bm)
- Length: 49 ft 0 in (14.9 m)
- Beam: 16 ft 10 in (5.1 m)
- Depth of hold: 7 ft 10 in (2.4 m)
- Sail plan: Schooner, or brig (mentions differ)
- Complement: 30
- Armament: 6 guns + 8 × ½-pounder swivel guns

HMS Gaspée (or HMS Gaspe or HMS Gaspé) was a brigantine purchased in North America in 1772, commissioned in 1773, and captured in 1775. The Royal Navy recaptured her in 1776. She was recommissioned and served again until she was prepared for disposal at the end of 1777. At some point she was at the "Battle of Fundy", but when this occurred and what her role was is currently obscure.

== Career ==
Lieutenant William Hunter was commissioned to HMS Gaspée in January 1773 after he had served as a lieutenant on HMS Lizard.

In September 1773, Gaspee carried the captured American leader Ethan Allen from Montreal to Quebec City.

In 1775, she arrived at Quebec to take on provisions. There Guy Carleton, the governor of the province of Quebec, persuaded Hunter to remain in Quebec and take some his men to Lake Champlain to that Carleton was having built at St. Jean. Lieutenant Hunter took command of HMS Royal Savage.

On 3 November, the British were forced to surrender at the siege of Fort St. Jean to advancing American forces. A bombardment sunk Royal Savage; Hunter and the 14 other members of the crew of the Gaspée were taken prisoner. Hunter writing 16 December 1775 to Admiral Samuel Graves at Boston reports he and his officers were at Weathersfield, Connecticut, while ten seamen were quartered at Canaan, Connecticut.

In Lieutenant Hunter's absence, command of Gaspée devolved on Mr. Chase, her master. She and HMS Hunter escorted a convoy of merchantmen from Nova Scotia to Boston, Massachusetts. They were at anchor outside the harbour when two American privateers came up and captured them on 23 November 1775.

On 3 May 1776 Isis, Surprise, and Martin sailed up the St. Lawrence River to the relief of Quebec. Surprise and Martin sailed ahead to "annoy" the retreating American troops. On their way they captured an American schooner armed with four 6-pounder and six 3-pounder guns, and recovered Gaspée.

The Americans scuttled Gaspée, but the British were able to weigh her and discovered that she was little damaged. (Note: The privateer was Maria, captured on 7 May. Surprise captured Gaspée on 17 May.)

In July 1776, Lieutenant George Wilson recommissioned Gaspée in Quebec; she was still under his command in 1777. She was paid off on 13 December 1777 for disposal.
