= John Holt (Lord Chief Justice) =

Lord Chief Justice of England 1689-1710

The Right Honourable Sir John Holt
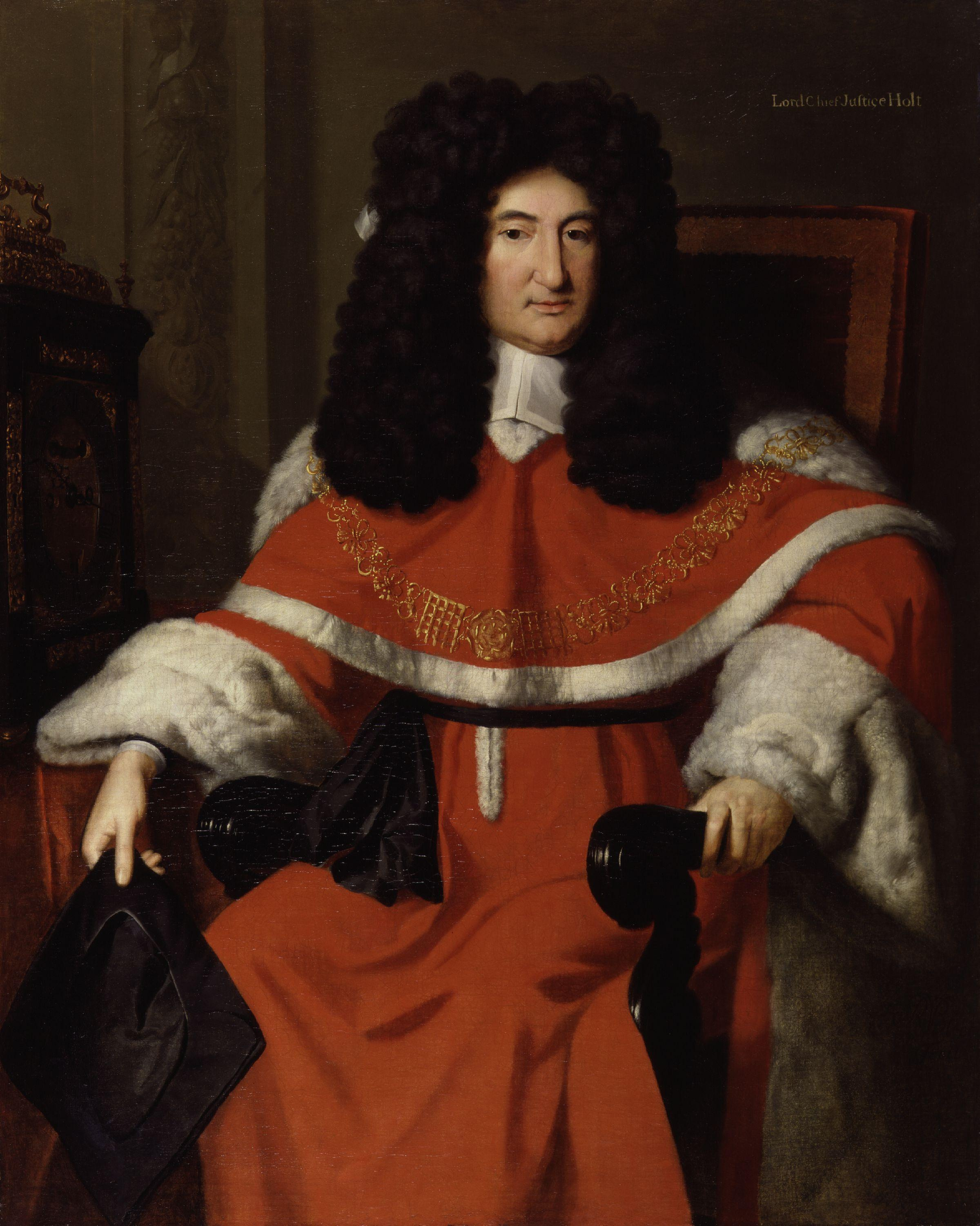
- Portrait by Richard van Bleeck, c. 1700
- Born: 23 December 1642; Abingdon-on-Thames
- Died: 5 March 1710 (aged 67); London

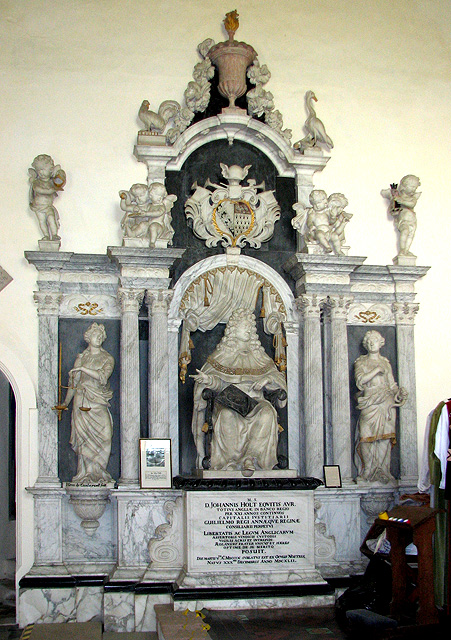
Monument to Sir John Holt in Redgrave Church, Suffolk

Sir John Holt (23 December 1642 – 5 March 1710) was an English lawyer who served as Lord Chief Justice of England from 17 April 1689 to his death. He is frequently credited with playing a major role in ending the prosecution of witches in English law.

== Biography ==
Holt was born in Abingdon in Berkshire (now Oxfordshire), the son of Sir Thomas Holt, MP for that town, and his wife, Susan, the daughter of John Peacock of Chieveley, also in Berkshire. He was educated at John Roysse's Free School in Abingdon (now Abingdon School) from 1652 to 1658, Gray's Inn and Oriel College, Oxford.

He purchased Redgrave Manor in Suffolk, which had been the seat of the Bacon family in 1702, when debts forced the fifth baronet, Sir Robert Bacon, to sell the estate. A letter in the Bodleian Library reads: "The celebrated Dr Radcliffe, the physician ... took special pains to preserve the life of LCJ Holt's wife, whom he attended out of spite to her husband, who wished her dead." Sir John Holt's sister Susan was married to Francis Levett, Esq., tobacco merchant and brother of Sir Richard Levett, Lord Mayor of London.

Holt's father, Sir Thomas Holt, possessed a small patrimonial estate, but in order to supplement his income had adopted the profession of law, in which he was not very successful, although he was appointed serjeant-at-law in 1677, and afterwards for his political services to the Tories was rewarded with a knighthood. Sir Thomas Holt's father was Rowland Holt (d. 1634 according to the Berkshire herald's visitation of 1664–66), who was probably identical to the merchant Rowland Holt who was murdered by muggers in Clerkenwell Fields in January 1635 (1634 OS). The crime was particularly notorious in the ballads and broadsheets of the time.

After attending for some years the free school of the town of Abingdon, of which his father was recorder, young Holt in his sixteenth year entered Oriel College, Oxford. He is said to have spent a very dissipated youth, and even to have been in the habit of taking purses on the highway, but after entering Gray's Inn about 1660 he applied himself with exemplary diligence to the study of law. He was called to the bar in 1663. A supporter of civil and religious liberty, he distinguished himself in state trials by the manner in which he supported the pleas of the defendants.

In 1675 he married Ann Cropley, a daughter of Sir John Cropley, 1st Baronet, of Clerkenwell, Middlesex, but the marriage was without issue.

In 1685–1686 Holt was appointed recorder of London, and about the same time he was made king's serjeant and received the honour of knighthood. His giving a decision adverse to the pretensions of the king to exercise martial law in time of peace led to his dismissal from the office of recorder, but he was continued in the office of king's serjeant in order to prevent him from becoming counsel for accused persons. Having been one of the judges who acted as assessors to the peers in the Convention parliament, he took a leading part in arranging the constitutional change by which William III was called to the throne, and after his accession he was appointed Lord Chief Justice of the King's Bench. He is best known for the firmness with which he upheld his own prerogatives in opposition to the authority of the Houses of Parliament. While in sympathy with the Whig party, Holt maintained on the bench political impartiality, and held himself aloof from political intrigue.

On the retirement of Somers from the office of Lord Chancellor in 1700 Holt was offered the office, but declined it.

He died in London on 5 March 1710 and was buried in the chancel of Redgrave church. His magnificent monument was sculpted by Thomas Green.

== Witchcraft trials ==
Historian John Callow argues in his 2022 book, The Last Witches of England, that sceptical judges, especially Holt, had already largely stopped convictions for witchcraft under English law even before the Witchcraft Act 1735 finally concluded such prosecutions. Callow particularly credits Holt with great courage in doing so in the face of religious pressure, mob violence, and popular superstitious belief in witchcraft. Wallace Notestein was of the same opinion, that by "the decisions of Powell and Parker, and most of all by those of Holt, the statute of the first year of James I was practically made obsolete twenty-five or fifty years before its actual repeal in 1736". For Notestein, "Holt did more than any other man in English history to end the prosecution of witches".

According to Callow, judges like Holt found "creative and practical ways around the statute book in order to prevent the execution of witches", with Holt "skilfully combining directions to jurymen that permitted religious faith and even the law's acceptance of the validity of witchbelief with measures to seek acquittals through the raising of questions of reasonable doubt and the unmasking of fraudulent cases of possession". At the end of one trial, that of Sarah Moordike, accused of witchcraft by Richard Hathaway, Holt ruled that Moordike's fees should be paid by Hathaway and that he should be arrested and imprisoned on charges of perjury for bringing false accusations about Moordike and for pretending to be bewitched. Hathaway was convicted at his own trial and, according to Callow, "the two trials of July 1701 and March 1702 registered highly significant verdicts in the history of witch persecution as they registered, respectively, not just the acquittal of an accused witch but the prosecution and punishment of her persecutor as a deterrent to others who might have been tempted to levy similar charges in the future".

George Lyman Kittredge wrote Holt "has a highly honorable name in the annals of English witchcraft" because all of the dozen to twenty trials he presided over resulted in acquittal. Contemporary with Holt, Lancelot Blackburne, Archdeacon of Cornwall, somewhat disturbed by Holt's actions in a trial, wrote to the Bishop of Exeter that the "Lord Chief Justice by his questions and manner of summing up the Evidence seem'd to me to believe nothing of witchery at all". Jonathan Barry, Professor of History at the University of Exeter, wrote that Holt, along with other sceptics like Francis Hutchinson and Francis North, "clearly regarded the witchcraft statute, and the uses to which it could be put by factious politicians feeding on the passions of the people, as the real danger to the establishment in state and church".

== Cases ==
- Crosse v Gardner (1689) Cart. 90, Lord Holt CJ held that 'An affirmation at the time of a sale is a warranty, provided it appears on evidence to be so intended.'
- Robert Charnock
- The tryal and condemnation of Capt. Thomas Vaughan for high treason (1696)
- Harvey v. Chamberlain (1696) (antagonism to slavery)
- Turberville v Stampe (1697) 91 ER 1072 (nuisance and vicarious liability)
- Medina v Staughton (1699) 1 Salk. 210, again on affirmations and warranties.
- Moordike v Hathaway (1701) and King v Hathaway (1702)
- Rose case (1701–1703)
- Coggs v Bernard (1703) 2 Ld Raym 909 (bailment)
- Ashby v White (1703) 2 Ld Raym 938 (the right to vote)
- Cole v Turner (1704) 87 ER 907 (definition of battery)
- Walden v Holman (1704) 6 Mod 115, Ld Raym. 1015, 1 Salk. 6 (pleading in abatement; the legal name of a person)
- Cockcroft v Smith (1705) 11 Mod 43, self-defence
- Smith v Gould (1705–07) 2 Salk 666 (antagonism to slavery), but see 91 ER 566
- Keeble v Hickeringill (1707) 11 East 574, Holt 19 (interference with property rights, "the duck pond case")

== See also ==
- List of Old Abingdonians

Parliament of England
Preceded by Sir John Maynard; John Elwill	Member of Parliament for Bere Alston; 1689; With: John Elwill	Succeeded by John Elwill; Sir John Trevor
Legal offices
Preceded by Sir Robert Wright	Lord Chief Justice; 1689–1710	Succeeded by Sir John Parker
