= Peter Seaman (mayor) =

Mayor of Norwich, England (1662–1715)

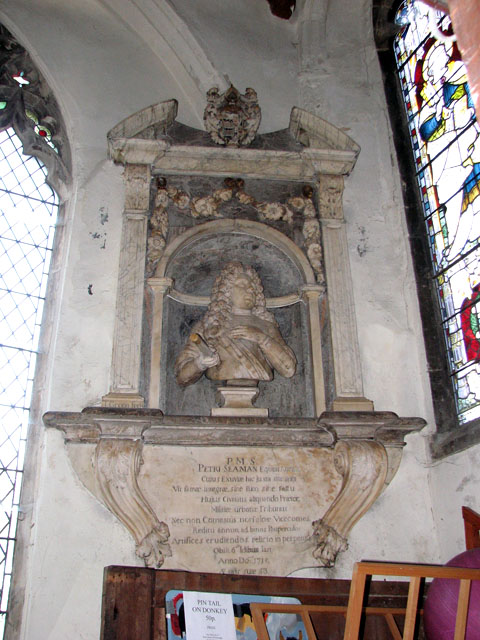
Mural monument to Sir Peter Seaman, St Gregory's Church, Pottergate, Norwich, sculpted by Thomas Green

Sir Peter Seaman (1662–1715), Knight Batchelor, of the City of Norwich in Norfolk, England, was a brewer who served as Mayor of Norwich 1707–08, Colonel of the City Corps and High Sheriff of Norfolk in 1710.

== Origins ==
He was the son of Thomas Seaman of the parish of Heigham, now part of the western suburbs of Norwich, also a brewer, who served as High Sheriff of Norfolk in 1688.

Mr Thomas Seaman, of St Margaret's Parish, Norwich, by will dated 10 August 1700, settled his closes lying between St. Giles's and St. Stephen's-Gates, containing nine acres, called Crabtree or Claypit closes, to pay £5 clear of all taxes, yearly, and gave £200 with which an estate in Heigham was purchased, to find £10 yearly, the former to bind out two girls, paying 50 shillings each, and the latter to bind out two boys yearly, paying £5 each, from the parishes of Heigham, St. Benedict, St. Swithin, and St. Margaret, "so that every year each parish hath a child bound out, and alternately a boy one year, and a girl the next".

== Career ==
He was a brewer by trade, as had been his father. He was knighted in 1712 by Queen Anne at St James's Palace. In pursuit of this honour he had obtained the support of the influential Norfolk gentleman Colonel Horace Walpole, MP, who in 1710 wrote on his behalf to Sidney Godolphin, 1st Earl of Godolphin (1702–1710), first minister of Queen Anne:

The Norwich people are very desirous that Colonel Seaman should be knighted and when I told them that it would be objected that he was a brewer, 'twas answered that worse than he that had not one half of his estate had been knighted ... he has actually £2,000 per annum besides his stock in trade, which is considerable. His Father and his wife’s Father have been High Sheriffs of the county and he himself within two years of the latter; he is a Justice of the Peace and a hearty honest man.

The records state: "Son of Peter Seaman, brewer, Norwich, £2,000 paid."

== Landholdings ==
His residence in Norwich was a large house near Anchor Quay. Other property he owned in the city was within the parish of St Julians and also a public house in St Swithins Alley. He worshipped at the Church of St Gregory in Norwich, the 1712 churchwarden accounts for which record that he had "new lined his pew on the north side of the chancel part of the nave", where his mayoral irons, inscribed "Sir P. S.", were placed.

== Marriage ==
He married Johanna Framlingham, the only child and sole heiress of Henry Framlingham.

== Death and monument ==
He died in 1715, aged 53, and was buried in the Church of St Gregory, Pottergate, Norwich, near the north chancel door. He bequeathed £25 to pay for the surviving mural monument to himself, with bust sculpted by Thomas Green of Camberwell. He is shown dressed in gilded armour, wearing a full wig and holding a baton of office. The monument was restored in 2007 by the Norwich Historic Churches Trust. It is inscribed in Latin as follows:

P(erpetuae) M(emoriae) S(acrum) Petri Seaman Equitis Aurati Cuius exuviae hic juxta sitae sunt. Vir Famae integrae sine Fuco sine Fastu huius Civitatis aliquando Praetor Militiae Urbanae Tribunus Necnon Comitatus Norfolciae Vicecomes. Redditu anno ad binos pauperculos artifices erudiendos relicto in perpetuum. Obiit vi° Iduum Jan. Anno Dom. 1715 aetatis suae 53.

(Sacred to the perpetual memory of Peter Seaman, Golden Knight, of whom the remains are placed near here. A man of unbroken fame without pretence without haughtiness at some time Mayor of this City, Tribune of the City Militia and not least Sheriff of the County of Norfolk. From one year's income (he left) in perpetuity for two poor boys in order to study craftmanship. He died on the 6th day of the Ides of January in the year of our Lord 1715, (in the year) of his age 53)

== Bequests ==
His will established a charity which survives today, providing funds for “apprenticing poor boys”. Now known as "Sir Peter Seaman’s Charity" (Registered Charity No 311101) it is governed by a Scheme of the Charity Commission dated 19 November 1889 as varied by Schemes of the Charity Commission dated 6 January 1931 and 15 March 1932. The formal objective is "to provide grants for the promotion of education, including social and physical training, of young persons of the City of Norwich who are under the age of 21 and who, in the opinion of the Trustees, are in need of financial assistance". The beneficiaries must reside within the City of Norwich and the contiguous parishes of Old Catton, Sprowston, Thorpe St. Andrew, Trowse with Newton, Cringleford, Colney, Costessey, Taverham, Drayton, Hellesdon and Horsham and Newton St. Faiths.

Blomefield (1806) summarises the bequest as follows:

Sir Peter Seaman, Knt. died in January this year (1715), and was buried in a vault made for him in St. Gregory's by the north chancel door; he left provision by will, to bind out two poor lads yearly for ever; the first year, out of St. Gregory's parish, and then year by year out of all the parishes in East-Wimer ward, (of which he was Alderman,) in their several turns, and then to revert again to St. Gregory's, &c.
