= Thomas Vaughan (pirate) =

17h-century Jacobite privateer and pirate

Thomas Vaughan (died 1696) was an Irish pirate and privateer who sailed for France during the Nine Years’ War. His trial was notable as a test of English common law against admiralty law.

== History ==
Vaughan has been a privateer as early as 1692 by raiding Protestant settlements and briefly capturing the Aran Islands. His ship Loyal Clencarty, was captured in July 1695 but escaped the following month, before he could be tried. He was recaptured in Hamburg in early 1696, escaped again and was recaptured and sent to England for trial that June.

English authorities wanted to try Vaughan for piracy by either ignoring his French privateering commission or linking him to ships stolen before he had joined the French. They were warned that English captives in France could face the same fate if Vaughan were tried as a pirate. English subjects were forbidden from serving foreign rulers against England, so he was accused of treason instead. The trial was conducted under common law but before Admiralty judges. Lord Chief Justice Holt remarked, “Acting by Vertue of a Commission from the French King, will excuse them from being Pyrates, tho not from being Traitors to their own State.” Vaughan argued that he was born in Martinique and was thus a French subject, but several witnesses confirmed his Irish citizenship.

He was tried in November 1696 with two of his men and was soon executed. Their trials were conducted the same day as the piracy trial of several Henry Every's crew sailors. Vaughan's counsel, William Oldys, was also present for the piracy trials of John Golden and William Kidd. Golden's trial was similar, and he was convicted of treason, not piracy though his commission had come from the deposed James II, instead of from Louis XIV, as had Vaughan's.

== See also ==
- Jacobitism, the movement to return James II to the throne of England
