= Turberville v Stampe =

- Citation: (1697) 91 ER 1072

Case opinions
- Chief Justice Holt

Keywords
- Vicarious liability

Turberville v Stampe (1697) 91 ER 1072 is an English tort law case concerning vicarious liability, also known as the respondeat superior doctrine. It was the leading, or first, case on the particular issue.

== Facts ==
The employee or "servant" of the defendant negligently began a fire which spread to and damaged a neighbour's house. The master argued he was not responsible because he was not personally at fault. Moreover, he had directed the employee the proper method of lighting fires, orders which were not followed.

== Judgment ==
Lord Chief Justice Holt gave judgment.

as man ought to keep the fire in his field, as well from the doing of damage to his neighbour as if it were in his house… if a stranger set fire to my house, and it burns my neighbour’s house, no action will lie against me… But if my servant throws dirt into the highway, I am indictable. So in this case if the defendant’s servant kindled the fire in the way of husbandry and proper for his employment, though he had no express command of his master, yet his master shall be liable to an action for damage done to another by the fire; for it shall be intended, that the servant had authority from his master, it being for the master’s benefit.

== Significance ==
Holt carried this broad vicarious liability into the commercial setting, noting that ‘the master at his peril ought to take care what servant he employs; and it is more reasonable, that [the master] should suffer for the cheats of his servant than strangers’ (ibid., 91 ER 797)

== See also ==
More from Holt

- Jones v Hart 2 Salk 441
- Middleton v Fowler 1 Salk 282
- Hern v Nichols 1 Salk 289

On liability for strangers and acts of God emanating from land

- Sedleigh Denfield v O'Callaghan [1940] AC 880
- Goldman v Hargrave [1967] 1 AC 645
- Smith v Littlewoods Organisation Ltd [1987] 1 AC 241
- Leakey v National Trust [1980] QB 485

On vicarious liability

- Lister v Hesley Hall Ltd [2002] 1 AC 215
- Hall (Inspector of Taxes) v Lorimer [1994] 1 All ER 250, freelance vision mixer not an employee for tax purposes, ‘never been better put than by Cooke J’ in Market Investigations Ltd v Minister of Social Security [1969] 2 QB 173
- Lee Ting Sang v Chung Chi-Keung [1990] 2 AC 374, 384, had own tools, paid by piece and did not price the job. ‘The applicant ran no risk whatever save that of being unable to find employment which is, of course, a risk faced by casual employees who move from one job to another…’
