= Coggs v Bernard =

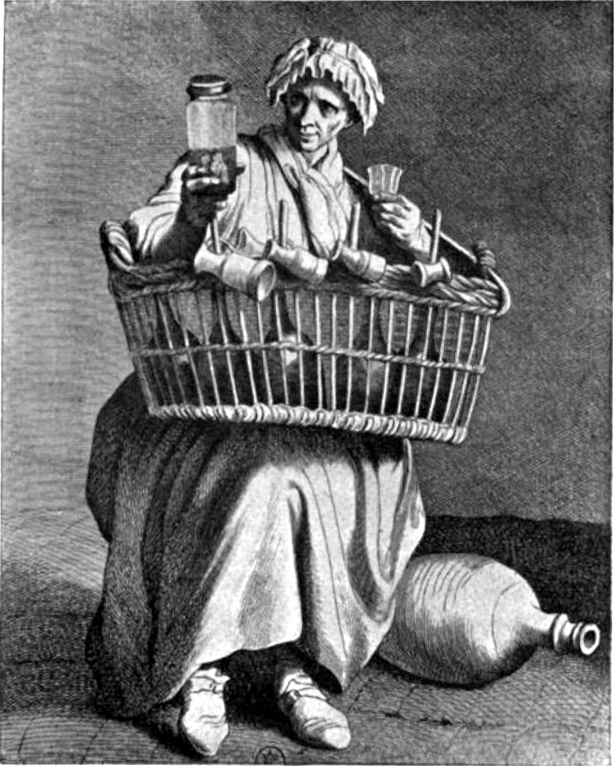
- Court: King's Bench
- Citation: (1703) 2 Ld Raym 909, 92 ER 107

Court membership
- Judges sitting: Lord Holt CJ, Powys J, Gould J and Powell J

Keywords
- Bailment, negligence, strict liability, common carrier

Coggs v Bernard (1703) 2 Ld Raym 909 (also Coggs v Barnard) is a landmark case both for English property law and contract law, decided by Sir John Holt, Chief Justice of the King's Bench. It sets out the duties owed by a bailee – someone in possession of property owned by another.

== Facts ==
William Bernard undertook to carry several barrels of brandy belonging to John Coggs from Brooks Market, Holborn to Water Street, just south of the Strand (about half a mile). Bernard's undertaking was gratuitous; he was not offered compensation for his work. As the brandy was being unloaded at the Water Street cellar, a barrel was staved and 150 gallons were lost.

Coggs brought an action on the case against Bernard, alleging he had undertaken to carry the barrels but had spilled them through his negligence.

== Judgment ==
Holt CJ at the London Guildhall found that Mr Bernard, the defendant, was negligent in carrying the casks and was therefore liable as a bailee. Holt made clear that Bernard's responsibility to Coggs was not formally contractual in nature, since he received no consideration. Instead, his responsibility rested on the trust that Coggs placed in him to use due care in transporting the casks, and by his tacit acceptance of that trust by taking the casks into his custody. Thus, because Bernard acted negligently when he was under a responsibility to use care, he was held to be in breach of a trust.

In the course of his judgment, Holt gave this well-known statement of the categories of bailment:

And there are six sorts of bailments. The first sort of bailment is, a bare naked bailment of goods, delivered by one man to another to keep for the use of the bailor; and this I call a depositum, and it is that sort of bailment which is mentioned in Southcote's case (1601) 4 Co. Rep. 83b; Cro Eliz 815.

The second sort is, when goods or chattels that are useful, are lent to a friend gratis, to be used by him; and this is called commodatum, because the thing is to be restored in specie.

The third sort is, when goods are left with the bailee to be used by him for hire; this is called locatio et conductio, and the lender is called locator, and the borrower conductor.

The fourth sort is, when goods or chattels are delivered to another as a pawn, to be a security to him for money borrowed of him by the bailor; and this is called in Latin vadium, and in English a pawn or a pledge.

The fifth sort is when goods or chattels are delivered to be carried, or something is to be done about them for a reward to be paid by the person who delivers them to the bailee, who is to do the thing about them.

The sixth sort is when there is a delivery of goods or chattels to somebody, who is to carry them, or do something about them gratis, without any rewards for such his work or carriage, which is this present case. I mention these things, not so much that they are all of them so necessary in order to maintain the proposition which is to be proved, as to clear the reason of the obligation, which is upon persons in cases of trust.

The case overturned the then leading case in the law of bailments, Southcote's Case (1601), which held that a general bailee was strictly liable for any damage or loss to the goods in his possession (e.g., even if the goods were stolen from him by force). Under the ruling in Coggs v Bernard, a general bailee was only liable if he had been negligent. Despite his reappraisal of the standard of liability for general bailees, Holt CJ refused to reconsider the long-standing common law rule that held common carriers strictly liable for any loss or damage to bailed property in their possession. Although admitting that the rule was "hard," Holt CJ justified it by stating:

This [rule] is a politik establishment, contrived by the policy of the law, for the safety of all persons, the necessity of whose affairs oblige them to trust these sorts of persons [i.e. carriers], that they may be safe in their ways of dealing: for else these carriers might have an opportunity of undoing all persons that had any dealings with them, by combining with thieves etc; and yet doing it in such a clandestine manner, as would not be possible to be discovered. And this is the reason the law is founded upon that point.

Sir John Powell concurred. He began his decision by saying, echoing Sir Edward Coke's famous dictum, "Let us consider the reason of the case. For nothing is law that is not reason."

== See also ==
- Ball v Coggs (1710) 1 Brown PC 140, 1 ER 471 and Ball v Lord Lanesborough (1713) 5 Brown PC 480, 2 ER 809, show that Mr Coggs was made bankrupt (Stat 8 Anne c 28 (1709)) after litigation from a former manager of a brass wire works, of which Coggs had been partner and treasurer. He had to pay £5,000.
- Lane v Cotton (1701) Salk 18 per Holt C.J.: “It is a hard thing to charge a carrier [with strict liability]: but if he should not be charged, he might keep a correspondence with thieves, and cheat the owner of his goods, and he should never be able to prove it”. The law presumes against the common carrier (i.e. imposes strict liability) “to prevent litigation, collusion, and the necessity of going into circumstances impossible to be unravelled”.
- Forward v Pittard (1785) 1 Term Rep. 27 at 33 per Lord Mansfield.
- Riley v Horne (1828) 5 Bing. 217, 220 per Best C.J.
- Somes v British Empire Shipping Co (1860) 8 H.L.C. 338
- The Katingaki [1976] 2 Lloyd's Rep 372
- The Winson [1981] 3 All E.R. 688 at 689
- Nugent v Smith (1876) 101, Cockburn CJ, strict liability of the common carrier said to be a, “principle of extreme rigour, peculiar to our own law, and the absence of which in the law of other nations has not been found by experience to lead to the evils for the prevention of which the rule of our law was supposed to be necessary.”
