= Goldman v Hargrave =

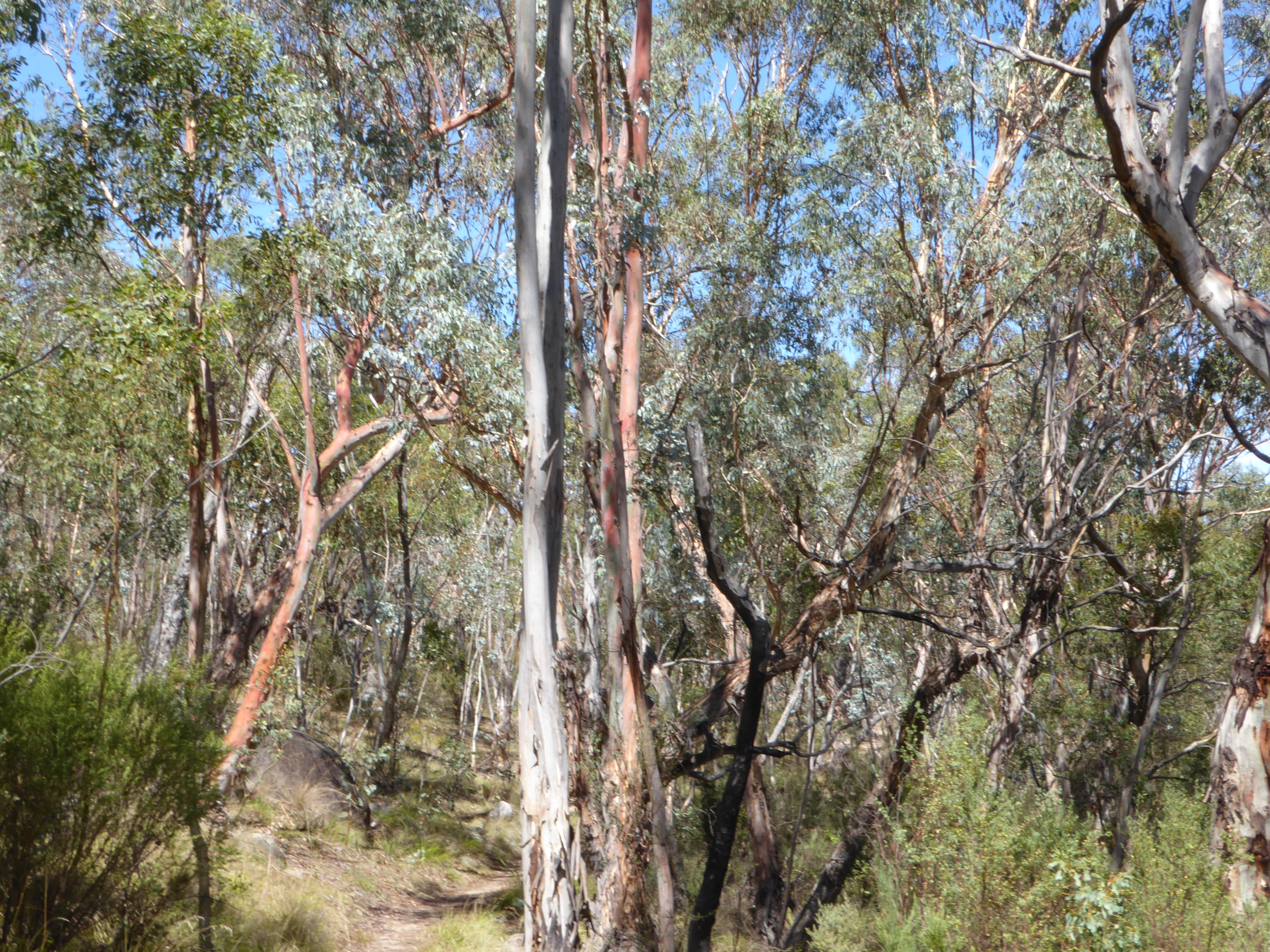
- Court: Privy Council
- Citations: [1966] UKPC 12, [1967] 1 AC 645, [1966] 3 WLR 513, [1966] 2 All ER 989, [1966] 2 Lloyd's Rep 65

Goldman v Hargrave [1967] 1 AC 645 is an Australian and English tort law case decided by the Privy Council concerning breach of duty.

== Facts ==
A 100 foot high red gum was hit by lightning and caught fire on Goldman's land in Gidgegannup, Western Australia, just past the Swan River outside Perth. The tree was cut down by the council and the proprietor let the remainder burn itself out. The wind changed and the fire spread, damaging much of Hargrave's property next door.

== Judgment ==
The Privy Council advised that the landowner was liable for negligence. Lord Wilberforce gave the opinion and said the following:

The issue is therefore whether in such a case the occupier is guilty of legal negligence, which involves the issue whether he is under a duty of care, and if so, what is the scope of that duty. Their Lordships propose to deal with these issues as stated, without attempting to answer the disputable question whether if responsibility is established it should be brought under the heading of nuisance or placed in a separate category. As this Board has recently explained in Overseas Tankship (UK) Ltd v The Miller Steamship Co (Wagon Mound No. II) the tort of nuisance, uncertain in its boundary, may comprise a wide variety of situations, in some of which negligence plays no part, in others of which it is decisive. The present case is one where liability, if it exists, rests upon negligence and nothing else; whether it falls within or overlaps the boundaries of nuisance is a question of classification which need not here be resolved.

He then held the occupier, Goldman, had a duty to act, and said he failed ‘to act with reasonable prudence so as to remove the hazard.’

== See also ==
- English tort law
