= National Provincial Bank Ltd v Ainsworth =

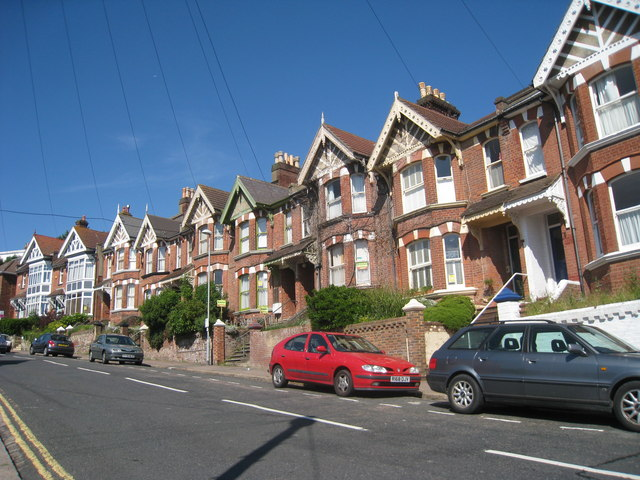
- Court: Judicial Committee of the House of Lords
- Full case name: National Provincial Bank Ltd v Ainsworth (A.P.)
- Decided: 13 May 1965
- Citations: [1965] UKHL 1 [1965] AC 1175 [1965] 2 All ER 472 [1965] 3 WLR 1

Case history
- Prior action: National Provincial Bank Ltd v Hastings Car Mart Ltd [1964] Ch 665

Case opinions
- Lord Denning MR; Lord Wilberforce
- Decision by: Lord Hodson; Lord Cohen; Lord Upjohn; Lord Wilberforce
- Concurrence: Lord Guest

Keywords
- Licence; sole legal ownership; competing equities; equity of lender; repossession; law of mortgages; family home rights

National Provincial Bank Ltd v Ainsworth [1965] is an English land law and family law case, concerning the quality of a person's interest in a home when people live together, as well as licences in land.

The House of Lords, the court of final appeal, held that someone living in a home, who was deserted, did not by that fact alone have an interest in equity. Lord Wilberforce offered a definition of property rights, however this level of the decision was compromised, and forms heavily amended principles of law, as the concept of the constructive trust was developed further.

More widely approved has been its principles of the overturned decision in the court below: the judgment of Denning LJ (noting the concurrence by Donovan LJ) some of which were cited with approval in the House of Lords in this case also.

== Facts ==
Mr and Mrs Ainsworth lived in Milward Road, Hastings, Sussex and had four children. Mr Ainsworth was the registered owner, but moved out in 1957, borrowed £1,000 in 1958 from the bank, and gave the bank a charge (security by mortgage) over it. The money was used for his small business, Hastings Car Mart Ltd, incorporated at the end of 1959. He had left his wife living in the home, deserting their relationship. In 1962 he (as borrower) fell behind in the payments to the bank who soon sought possession of the house and sued, bringing this action. However, Mrs Ainsworth refused to leave because she contended that she had an interest in the home that bound the bank.

== Judgment ==
=== Court of Appeal ===
The Court of Appeal held Mrs Ainsworth had a right to occupy that bound the bank. Lord Denning MR held that the ‘deserted wife’s equity’ was capable of binding a third party like a bank. The reasons for his judgment were as follows.

Since the war there have been many cases in this court which have established that a wife, who has been deserted by her husband, has a right to remain in occupation of the matrimonial home unless and until the court orders her to go. The development can be easily traced. Prior to the war it was recognised that, where the husband owns the matrimonial home and is living there himself, he cannot turn his wife out. He cannot treat her as a stranger. He cannot exclude her from the house without good cause. See Shipman v Shipman, by Atkin L.J. Now suppose he deserts his wife and goes off, leaving her in the matrimonial home with the children. Is he to be in any better position because he has deserted her? Can he turn her out as if she was a stranger? Clearly not. He cannot take advantage of his own wrong – of his own desertion – and use it as a ground for ejecting her. The reason is simply this: it is the husband's duty to provide the wife with a roof over her head; and, by providing the matrimonial home, he gives her an authority to be there. It is an authority which he cannot revoke, so long as it remains the matrimonial home. He certainly cannot revoke it on his desertion. Just as in olden days a deserted wife had an irrevocable authority to pledge his credit for necessaries, so in these days she has an irrevocable authority to remain in the matrimonial home. It is revocable only by order of the court: see Jess B Woodcock & Sons Ltd v Hobbs.

When the right of a deserted wife was first recognised, it was based on procedural grounds. The husband, it was said, could not sue the wife in tort. He could not sue her in trespass. He could not recover possession by action at law. He could only apply for possession under section 17 of the Married Women's Property Act 1882; and under that section the court had a discretion whether to order her out or not: see H v H.; Stewart v Stewart, by Tucker L.J. Those procedural grounds have now disappeared; for, by the Law Reform (Husband and Wife) Act 1962, a husband can now sue his wife in tort. But substantive law has a habit of being secreted in the interstices of procedure. And that is so here. The right of a deserted wife remains the same after the Act of 1962 as it was before. But it must now be based, not on procedural grounds, but on the true ground that the husband is presumed to have given authority to his wife to remain in the matrimonial home - and this is a conclusive presumption which he is not at liberty of his own head to revoke. The right is now so well established that it is not open to question. It has received the commendation of the Royal Commission on Marriage and Divorce (Cmnd. 9678 (1956), p. 180). They said (in para. 664): "We think it has been right to afford this protection to a deserted wife, to allow her to keep a roof over her head; it would be shocking to contemplate that a husband could put his wife and children into the street, so that he could himself return to live in the home, perhaps with another woman."

But the question here is: What is the position of successors in title? Suppose the husband, after deserting his wife, sells the house over her head, or mortgages it without her knowledge. Can the purchaser or mortgagee turn her out? The courts have already given some consideration to the problem. Take first the case where the husband becomes bankrupt and the property becomes vested in his trustee in bankruptcy. Can the trustee turn her out and sell the house for the benefit of the creditors? This court has held that the trustee stands in no better position than the husband and cannot turn her out: see Bendall v McWhirter. Take then the case where the husband sells the house to his new mistress for an agreed price. Can the mistress turn her out? It would be surprising if she could. Lynskey J. held that the new mistress cannot turn out the wife: see Street v Denham; Churcher v Street. Take next the case where the husband conveys the house to a purchaser, by a genuine conveyance and no sham, but intending that the purchaser should sue the wife for possession. In one case he conveyed it to his brother-in-law; in another to a speculator. Can such a purchaser turn out the wife? The judges have held that he cannot do so: see Ferris v Weaven; Savage v Hubble. Take finally this case, where the husband conveys the house to a company, which is entirely under his control, in return for fully paid shares. Can the company turn out the wife? Cross J. thought it inconceivable. "I cannot think, however," he said, "that any court would allow the company to turn Mrs. Ainsworth out of the house without providing her with another home."

Such being the decided cases, what is the principle underlying them? It is the way of English law to decide particular cases and then seek for the principle. It has been suggested that those cases turned on the fact that there was a collusive arrangement between husband and purchaser. But what does this mean? Collusion is not unlawful if it is designed to achieve a lawful end by lawful means. In all these cases, if the wife has no right to remain there, the husband is fully entitled to sell the house to a purchaser or to give it away, even though the design of both is that the purchaser or donee should evict her for their own benefit. It is only because she has a right to remain that it is unlawful to enter into an arrangement designed to turn her out. Take this simple instance: Suppose the husband says to a prospective purchaser: "I cannot myself turn out my wife because I have deserted her; but if you buy from me, there is nothing to stop you getting her out, and then you can sell with vacant possession." If such a transaction were permitted, the husband would benefit greatly because he would get a high price at his wife's expense. There is nothing wrong with such a transaction if the wife has no right to remain. But there is everything wrong with it if she has a right. It seems to me that, if the cases I have mentioned were correctly decided, as I believe them to be, it can only be on the footing that the wife has a right to remain in the matrimonial home - and a right which is enforceable against the successors of the husband - save, of course, a purchaser for value without notice.

What, then, is the nature of the wife's right? Much has been written about it and I would express my gratitude to Professor Cheshire for his lecture on a New Equitable Interest in Land (16 Modern Law Review 1), to Professor Sheridan for his article on Licences to Live in Houses (17 Conveyancer and Property Lawyer, N.S. 440), to Professor Crane for his article on The Deserted Wife's Licence (19 Conveyancer and Property Lawyer, yer, N.S. 343) and to Mr. Maudsley for his article on Licence to Remain on Land (other than a Wife's Licence) (20 Conveyancer and Property Lawyer, N.S. 281) for their most helpful articles on it The wife has no tenancy. She has no legal estate or equitable interest in the land. All that she has is a licence. But not a bare licence. She has a licence coupled with an equity. I mean an "equity" as distinguished from an equitable interest. The distinction was well pointed out by Upjohn J. in Westminster Bank Ltd v Lee. It is an equity which the court will enforce against any successor except a purchaser for value without notice.

If you look through the books you will find many analogous cases of a "licence coupled with an equity." If the owner of land grants a licence to another to go upon land and occupy it for a specific period or a prescribed purpose, and on the faith of that authority the licensee enters into occupation and does work, or in some other way alters his position to his detriment, then the owner cannot revoke the licence at his will. He cannot revoke the licence so as to defeat the period or purpose for which it was granted. A court of equity will restrain him from so doing. Not only will it restrain him, but it will restrain any successor who takes the land with knowledge or notice of the arrangement that has been made. I will give three illustrations:

First, at common law.

The common law courts have, of course, for centuries protected a licence coupled with an interest. It has been always held that a licensor, who has granted an interest, cannot derogate from his grant so as to destroy the interest granted; nor can his successor in title. Some difficulty has been felt in deciding what is an "interest" within this rule. But it seems that a contractual licence to occupy, followed up by actual occupation, was regarded as an interest, or rather as a "sort of interest," within the rule. The first case on this point was Webb v Paternoster, when an owner of land granted a man a licence to put a stack of hay on his land until he (the licensee) could conveniently sell it. It was a typical contractual licence but no tenancy. It was held that the licence, coupled as it was with actual occupation of the land on which the stack stood, was binding, not only on the licensor, but also on his successors. Montague C.J., with the concurrence of Haughton J., said: "This is an interest which chargeth the land into whosoever's hands it comes ." The reasoning of the case on this point was discussed in Wallis v Harrison, where Lord Abinger C.B. said: "the grant of the licence to put the haystack on the premises was in fact a grant of the occupation by the haystack, and the party might be considered in possession of that part of the land which the haystack occupied," and Parke B. said : "the licence was executed, by putting the stack of hay on the land; the plaintiffs there had a sort of interest, against the licensor and his assigns." That "sort of interest" is now recognised to be, not a legal interest but an equity: see Winter Garden Theatre (London) Ltd v Millennium Productions Ltd.

Second, in equity.

There are many cases where the owner of land has granted another a licence to occupy land and to execute works upon it, so that the licensee can use them for his own purposes. It has invariably been held that, once the works are executed, the licensee has an "equity" which is binding on the licensor and his successors: see Duke of Beaufort v Patrick; Dillwyn v Llewelyn. There may be no binding contract to grant any particular interest to the licensee, but nevertheless the court will look at the circumstances in each case to decide in what way the "equity" can be satisfied: see Plimmer v Wellington Corpn. Quite recently there was a similar case, but the court reached the same result by invoking the doctrine of estoppel: see Hopgood v Brown. But whether it be called an "equity" or an "estoppel," the fact remains that the successor was bound just as the original licensor.

Third, Errington v Errington and Woods.

Finally, there was a case where the owner of land granted a licence to a young couple to occupy a house as their home so long as they paid the instalments to the building society. They went into occupation on this footing. It was held binding, not only on the licensor but also on his devisee: see Errington v Errington and Woods.

In all those cases the licensee was in actual occupation. Indeed in all the cases that I have found where a licence, coupled with an equity, has been held binding on successors, the licensee has been in actual occupation of the land. If he is not in actual occupation the position may be different. For there are two cases where the licensee was not in actual occupation and the licence was held not to bind successors. One was a licence to affix advertisements on a wall: King v David Allen and Sons, Billposting Ltd. The other was a licence to exercise "front of the house" rights in a theatre: see Clore v Theatrical Properties Ltd and Westby & Co Ltd. That can not properly be said to be actual occupation.

Such being the nature of the right of a deserted wife - it is a "licence coupled with an equity" - there remains the task of fitting it into the property statutes. Take first unregistered land. Is it an incumbrance which must be registered under the Land Charges Act 1925? The answer is "No." It is not capable of registration. It is not an estate contract or an equitable easement. It is protected as an equity without registration. It is protected against any successor except a purchaser for value without notice; and the question of notice is to be determined by asking whether the particular matter would have come to the knowledge of the successor "if such inquiries and inspections had been made by him as ought reasonably to have been made by him": see section 199 (1) (ii) (a) of the Law of Property Act 1925, and the judgment of Upjohn J. in Westminster Bank Ltd v Lee.

Take next registered land, for that is what we are concerned with here. The question depends upon whether the wife's right is an "over-riding interest"; for, if it is, it does not need to be registered. Section 70 (1) of the Land Registration Act 1925, includes amongst "over-riding interests" the following: (g) The rights of every person in actual occupation of the land or in receipt of the rents and profits thereof, save when inquiry is made of such person and the rights are not disclosed." Does the right of a deserted wife come within that subsection? Is it an "over-riding interest"? The words "every person" in the section clearly include a deserted wife; for she is a person in actual occupation of the land. But has she a "right" within the subsection? Mr. Mervyn Davies submitted to us that the "rights" there are confined to proprietary rights, such as the rights of a tenant, and do not include the rights of a licensee or of a deserted wife. I can see no ground for putting this limitation on the section. The section is a statutory application to registered land of the well-known rule protecting the rights of persons in occupation. It was stated by Wigram V.-C. in his judgment in Jones v Smith: "if a person purchases an estate which he knows to be in the occupation of another than the vendor, he is bound by all the equities which the party in such occupation may have in the land." Likewise Mr. Pemberton Leigh (afterwards Lord Kingsdown) in Barnhart v Greenshields said: "if there be a tenant in possession of land, a purchaser is bound by all the equities which the tenant could enforce against the vendor." Those statements refer specifically to equities and are not confined to proprietary rights. Indeed, one can think of many cases where rights, not being proprietary rights, are protected by the section. An obvious example is the equity of a licensee arising from his expenditure on land. Another example is the right of a statutory tenant to be in possession. Further, the right of a requisitioning authority to be in possession. None of these are proprietary rights – none are capable of registration under the Land Charges Act – but they are clearly rights within section 70 (1) (g). I see no reason whatever for excluding the right of a deserted wife from section 70 (1) (g). It is, I think, an overriding interest.

In my judgment, therefore, so far as registered land is concerned, the right of a deserted wife to remain in occupation is a right within section 70 (1) (g) and is an overriding interest, available against all successors, save where inquiry is made of her, and her rights are not disclosed. So far as unregistered land is concerned, it is a right to be in actual occupation, and it is available against all successors except purchasers for value without notice. This difference between registered and unregistered land is inevitable. It is the result of the statutes; and applies to all rights of a person in actual occupation of land. In cases such as the present there is very little difference in the result; because anyone who is buying a dwelling-house, or lending money on the security of it, ought reasonably to make inquiries as to who is in actual occupation of the house and on what terms. The inquiry will, of course, usually be made of the husband who is selling or mortgaging it. He will presumably tell the truth; but, in order to be quite safe, it should be followed up at the house itself. If the purchaser makes no inquiry, he takes his chance and is bound by the rights of whomsoever is in actual occupation. In the words of Mr. Pemberton Leigh (afterwards Lord Kingsdown) in Barnhart v Greenshields: "the possession of the tenant" – and, I would add, the possession of the person in actual occupation – "is notice that he has some interest in the land, and that a purchaser having notice of that fact, is bound, according to the ordinary rule, either to inquire what that interest is, or to give effect to it, whatever it may be."

It is said that this will put an undue burden on purchasers and mortgagees, but I do not see this. If the husband, on deserting his wife, had granted the wife a tenancy (as he might well have done) they would be bound by it if they made no inquiry of her. So, in order to be safe, they should make inquiry at the house. I do not see why it should be in the least embarrassing. All they need say is: "As we are buying (or lending money on) the house, we wish to verify the occupation of it." She may say: "I live here with my husband," or "I am a tenant," or "My husband has left me." The husband may deny it, but his denial would not affect her right, if she was a tenant. Nor should it, if she has been deserted.

Then it is said that the wife should look after herself and should apply to the court for an injunction to stop her husband selling the house over her head (see Lee v Lee and register the suit as a pending action under the Land Charges Act 1925. But what wife, I ask, on being deserted, has the knowledge or foresight to do this? More often than not she carries on in the house, hoping that her husband will return. She does not go straight off to a lawyer; and, if she does, it is not every lawyer who advises action at once. The lawyer here did not do so. Surely she can rest on the fact that she is in actual occupation of the house. The burden should not rest on her to take action, but on the purchaser to make inquiries.

Applying section 70 (1) (g) to the present case, in my opinion the right of the wife was an overriding interest. She was a person in actual occupation of the house, 124, Milward Road. She had a right to stay there unless and until the court ordered her out. The bank made no inquiries whatever about the position. They knew that the owner was a limited company; and that the company was not in occupation itself. But they did not inquire who was in occupation or on what terms. They presumed that there was some "informal tenancy" between the company and Mr. Ainsworth. But they did not ask whether there was such a tenancy in fact or what its terms were. It might have been for five or seven years at a low rent, for all they knew; and, if it had been, they would have been bound by it. They had clear notice that the husband's address was No. 13, Devonshire Road, where his mother lived; and where they always found him in case of need. They never found him at No. 124, Milward Road at all. That was enough to put them on inquiry as to who was in occupation of No. 124, Milward Road, and on what terms. But they made no inquiry at all. In the absence of any inquiry, I see deserted wife.

Donovan LJ concurred. Russell LJ dissented.

=== House of Lords ===
The House of Lords reversed the decision of the Court of Appeal, finding that Mrs Ainsworth’s right did not count as a property right and was not capable of binding the bank.

Lord Upjohn said the following.

...in this case in truth and in fact the wife at all material times was and is in exclusive occupation of the home. Until her husband returns she has dominion over the house and she could clearly bring proceedings against trespassers.

Lord Wilberforce noted that a deserted wife’s equity has been there partly because of a persistent post war housing shortage, and has been variously described as an equity, clog, licence or status of irremovability, and said this is all about whether despite Mrs Ainsworth’s rights against her husband, she had any against the bank. The wife, he continued,

has no specific right against her husband to be provided with any particular house, nor to remain in any particular house.... [the wife's rights] as regards the occupation of her husband’s property, are essentially of a personal kind.

[...]

Before a right or an interest can be admitted into the category of property, or of a right affecting property, it must be definable, identifiable by third parties, capable in its nature of assumption by third parties, and have some degree of permanence or stability. The wife’s right has none of these qualities, it is characterised by the reverse of them.

[...]

The ultimate question must be whether [Mrs Ainsworth] can be given the protection which social considerations of humanity evidently indicate without injustice to third parties and a radical departure from sound principles of real property law.

== See also ==
- English trusts law
- English land law
- English family law
