= Nuisance lawsuit =

Nuisance lawsuit may refer to:

- A suit of the tort of nuisance, i.e. the plaintiff claims the defendant is causing a nuisance to the plaintiff
- A frivolous lawsuit, i.e. by bringing the suit, the plaintiff is causing a nuisance to the defendant
