= Watching brief (lawsuit) =

A watching brief is a method normally used in criminal cases by lawyers to represent clients not directly a party to the suit and to function as an observer. The method is normally used to help protect the rights and interests of victims of a crime, or also to protect a defendant from possible malicious prosecution. This method is used in countries such as Australia and Malaysia. Essentially, the lawyer must familiarize himself with the case at hand and understand the legal implication of every action or omission vis a vis his clients' interests.

In other countries like Kenya and Uganda, the lawyer watching brief has to work hand in hand with the prosecutor to ensure that the police file is availed in court at the hearing and witnesses bonded to attend court. Whereas the lawyer is not strictly performing the duty of the police, the advocate watching brief plays a crucial role in ensuring that the evidence presented to court is sufficient to secure a conviction for the offender thus preventing his or her client from civil suits for malicious prosecution arising from an acquittal.

To familiarize oneself with the matter, it is absolutely necessary that the lawyer obtains all witness statements and documents to be relied on and peruses them carefully. Should there be a loophole in the evidence, the lawyer should raise it with the prosecution for redress. To achieve this, it is imperative that the lawyer develops a cordial relationship with the prosecutor so that the information flowing to the prosecutor will appear as persuasive suggestions as opposed to orders which are more often likely to be ignored since the lawyer has no control over the prosecutor in his line of duty. Further, in Kenya, apart from introducing themselves, the lawyer watching brief has no right of audience before the court and so the prosecutor becomes his mouthpiece.

In other words, being retained to watch brief should never be one passive, boring duty but one that should interest every lawyer interested in criminal jurisprudence. It is actually calling to account every party in the trial without being heard, working behind the scenes, and giving the much needed backup to the side enforcing your client's rights.
