= SAD scheme =

Tool in intellectual property enforcement

A SAD scheme (where SAD stands for Schedule "A" Defendant) is a form of intellectual property enforcement in the United States. SAD schemes often target online merchants outside the U.S., particularly those in China. This scheme, frequently used by trademark owners, involves intellectual property rightsowners filing a lawsuit against multiple online merchants using a sealed complaint that does not publicly identify the defendants. The rightsowners then seek an ex-parte temporary restraining order (TRO) directing the online marketplaces to freeze the defendants' accounts and funds. This entire process occurs without the defendants' knowledge, denying them the opportunity to present their side of the story. The marketplace account freeze often pressures defendants into settling with the rightsowner quickly, rather than engaging in an expensive legal battle.

A SAD scheme provides rightsowners with a low-cost option to mass-enforce their intellectual property against large groups of online merchants, particularly those outside the U.S. However, this tactic is controversial, as it is highly error-prone and can have significant and long-term adverse consequences for innocent merchants. Moreover, it exploits gaps in the legal system's efforts to ensure due process, raising questions about its fairness and effectiveness.

== Background ==
The "SAD" acronym was coined by Prof. Eric Goldman of Santa Clara University School of Law to refer to “the Schedule A Defendants scheme.” The acronym reflects the fact that rightsowners deploying the scheme often list the defendants in a "Schedule A" to the complaint rather than the more typical approach of enumerating defendants in the case caption. By listing defendants in a Schedule A, the rightsowner can more easily request that the judge seal it, preventing defendants and the public from knowing who has been sued. The secrecy of the defendants’ identities can make it easier for the rightsowner to seize the defendants’ assets and prevent them from destroying evidence. However, the secrecy also means that the legal process takes place without the standard due process requirements that defendants have notice of the proceeding and an opportunity to be heard.

A key aspect of the SAD scheme is that the rightsowner names dozens or hundreds of defendants in a single Schedule A. By doing so, the rightsowner saves the federal court filing fees, substantially lowering the cost of filing per defendant. However, such mass enforcement of IP rights in a single lawsuit can raise concerns about joinder.

After filing the complaint with the sealed Schedule A, rightsowners request a temporary restraining order (TRO) without the defendants’ knowledge or presence. Judges are more inclined to grant the TRO without hearing the defendants’ side of the story. The TRO will instruct the defendants to stop their (allegedly) infringing activity, in addition to instructing online marketplaces to freeze the defendants’ accounts and funds. Defendants often learn that they have been sued only after the online marketplace has implemented this freeze, which can leave them confused and blindsided. The freeze also costs the defendants money from lost sales and may leave them without sufficient cash flow to retain an attorney to represent them in court. Thus, the freeze often induces the defendants to settle so they can quickly unfreeze their accounts, make new sales, and access their frozen cash. Other defendants may not get legal notice of the court proceeding or may be unable to appear in court, in which case the rightsowner will seek a default judgment and attempt to have the frozen cash transferred to them as damages.

The first SAD scheme lawsuit was filed sometime around 2013, but it has grown rapidly since then. In 2022, 938 SAD scheme cases were filed, each naming dozens or hundreds of defendants. As a result, tens of thousands of online merchants are secretly sued each year using the SAD scheme. Most SAD scheme lawsuits involve the enforcement of trademark rights, and most of the lawsuits are filed in the Chicago area, with some activity also taking place in the New York and Miami metro areas.

== Criticism ==
Critics of SAD suits have raised several concerns about due process, including:

- Insufficient pre-filing investigation. Rightsowners often do not invest much, if any, effort into investigating individual defendants. Instead, they rely on vague, unspecific, and generic allegations about all defendants that may or may not be true, instead of making well-researched defendant-specific factual allegations about each defendant as required by the Federal Rules of Civil Procedure.
- Service of process. Marketplaces often freeze allegedly infringing accounts and funds immediately after receiving a complaint without the rightsowner even serving the defendants; this allows the rightsowners to avoid the complexities and costs associated with serving international defendants. When attempting service, courts may also allow rightsowners to serve the complaint by email, which recipients may disregard as a spam or phishing attack.
- Jurisdiction. Rightsowners often do little to allege specific facts about why each defendant is subject to personal jurisdiction in the rightsowner's chosen venue. Because defendants do not appear in court, they do not have an opportunity to raise jurisdictional issues. Courts may nonetheless injoin defendants that they do not have the authority to reach.
- Joinder. Federal Rules of Civil Procedure permit defendants to be named in a single lawsuit only if the claim "aris[es] out of the same transaction, occurrence, or series of transactions or occurrences". However, critics point out that SAD scheme defendants have nothing in common beyond the alleged violations. The lack of relations between the defendants should negate joinder, but courts have not always enforced this requirement rigorously in SAD scheme cases. This lax enforcement of joiner requirements allows rightsowners to save on filing fees, which increases the enforcement effort's profitability. One scholar estimated that rightsowners had saved over a quarter-billion U.S. dollars by using the SAD scheme to combine defendants rather than suing each defendant individually.
- Ex parte proceedings. When courts decide a case without the defendants present, they are more likely to make errors. Many merchants do not have enough money at stake or lack the financial ability to attempt to correct those errors in subsequent court proceedings or on appeal. As a result, the SAD scheme can produce many uncorrected judicial errors.
- Mismatch between the remedies and the infringement. Even if the defendants did infringe the plaintiff's intellectual property, the account and cash freeze may impact non-infringing sales and revenues that are not properly subject to any restriction. For example, if an online merchant has made 1,000 sales, of which one was infringing, typically the rightsowner is legally entitled to restrict only the infringing sale and its associated revenue. Instead, the account and funds freeze affects the 999 other non-infringing sales as well.

== Usage ==
In 2023, using the SAD scheme, country singer Luke Combs obtained a $250,000 default judgment against Nicol Harness, a Combs fan who had sold $380 worth of tumblers featuring a likeness of Combs. Combs claimed he had no knowledge of the suit. Harness, who was in the hospital for congestive heart failure at the time of the judgment, also had $5,500 frozen in her Amazon seller account.

Despite Harness being notified of the lawsuit via email, this notification landed in her spam folder, and she remained unaware of the proceedings until receiving notice of the $250,000 judgment. In response to the concerns about suing a fan while she was sick, Combs subsequently issued an apology, sent Harness $11,000, and offered to sell the tumblers through his official merchandise store to assist with Harness' medical bills.

== See also ==
- Copyfraud
- Forum shopping
- Frivolous lawsuit
- Patent troll
- Notice and take down
- Trademark troll
