= H v H =

Irish Supreme Court case

JMH v. KH
- Coat of arms of Ireland
- Court: Supreme Court of Ireland
- Full case name: J M H (Husband) v K H (Wife)
- Decided: 26th of November 2015
- Citation: [2015] IESC 85

Case history
- Appealed from: High Court

Court membership
- Judge sitting: Charleton J Dunne J Denham CJ

Case opinions
- Decision by: Charleton J

Keywords
- Family law; Vexatious litigation; Sanctions; Isaac Wunder order

H v H, [2015] IESC 85, also known as JMH v KH, is an Irish Supreme Court case in which the husband was found to have vexatiously abused the court process by repeatedly pursuing legal action against his former wife. An Isaac Wunder order was made by the court against the husband which states that any legal proceedings against his wife and children will be halted. However, the court did not suspend all legal action from the husband; rather it ruled that further legal action would require a decision by a relevant court. This decision is significant because the Court established guidelines for when common law principles could be reinterpreted.

== Background ==
=== History ===
The plaintiff (referred to as JMH, the husband) and the defendant (KH, the wife) had three children together and split up in 2001. JMH was suspicious of KH's new partner, and cited concerns over the safety of his children around the partner and his extended family, initiating High Court proceedings on May 22, 2009, having previously been before the Circuit Court eight times and District Court twenty times. On May 11, 2010, MacMenamin J. ruled that the new partner was restrained from entering the former "H" family home or contacting the children, while JMH and KH were restrained from communicating to the children the circumstances of the case.

On April 13, 2011, JMH initiated new proceedings seeking "full custody and control of [their] children" as well as a further restraining order to the partner to "stay away from [JMH] and the children". On May 10, 2011, the orders from the judgement of 2010 were discharged and JMH was ordered to refer to the Circuit Court for further legal action pertaining to the case. MacMenamin J. also noted the "children have been lost sight of" in the case and recommended the "parties ... put litigation behind them and get on with the rest of their lives." KH went on to initiate divorce proceedings, which JMH claimed not to be aware of, and married her new partner on May 5, 2015. The marriage ceremony was interrupted by JMH.

Bringing the issue to court once again on November 24, 2015, this time in the Supreme Court, JMH complained his concerns for his children laid out in prior cases had come to fruition, but no evidence could be found of this aside from an accidental injury to one of the children. JMH also claimed to ask for an extension to appeal the divorce, though no evidence was found that pointed to that.

== Holding of the Supreme Court ==
Charleton J. observed that KH merely "wished to live an ordinary life free from the continual strain of court appearances" and that JMH had "abused the processes of the court" to the point where the safety of the children was no longer the focus of the proceedings, instead focusing on "wrong that [was] more apparent than real".

Regarding the divorce appeal, Charleton J. stated:

"The circumstances under which validly married couple might face a late appeal claiming that the divorce of one of them was improperly granted are, perhaps absent fraud on the system by both or one or other of them, impossible to imagine. No decision is now to be made in that regard."

Charleton J. held the appeal was vexatious and restated the order made by MacMenamin J. that JMH should have referred to the Circuit Court, and that in doing so many of the issues surrounding the case would have been avoided. JMH's failure to appeal the High Court decision on time was also considered.

=== Decision ===
An Isaac Wunder order was made by the court, stating all proceedings by JMH relating to KH or the children of their marriage would be stayed. Nevertheless, consideration to JMH's right to litigate was made. Charleton J. stated:

"The possibility of a genuine issue arising cannot be totally ruled out. Furthermore, the right to litigate cannot be left extinguished and without the possibility of suspending such an order. Consequently, JMH, may by application grounded on a full affidavit explaining the necessity for any further litigation apply to the President of the relevant court, or to any judge nominated by him, for such limited relief as may be proven on that application to be necessary and not previously litigated. This judgment and order should be brought to the attention of the judge by JMH. There will be no need for KH to attend unless she wishes to."

The appeal was dismissed.

== Subsequent developments ==
The court's assertion that High Court proceedings related to family law should be brought to the Circuit Court's attention instead was influential in at least one future case.

== See also ==
- Isaac Wunder order
- Vexatious litigation
