= Malicious prosecution =

Prosecution without probable cause to punish an individual

Malicious prosecution is a common law intentional tort. Like the tort of abuse of process, its elements include (1) intentionally (and maliciously) instituting and pursuing (or causing to be instituted or pursued) a legal action (civil or criminal) that is (2) brought without probable cause and (3) dismissed in favor of the victim of the malicious prosecution. In some jurisdictions, the term malicious prosecution denotes the wrongful initiation of criminal proceedings, while the term malicious use of process denotes the wrongful initiation of civil proceedings.

Criminal prosecuting attorneys and judges are protected from tort liability for malicious prosecution by doctrines of prosecutorial immunity and judicial immunity. Moreover, the mere filing of a complaint cannot constitute an abuse of process. The parties who have abused or misused the process have gone beyond merely filing a lawsuit. The taking of an appeal, even a frivolous one, is not enough to constitute an abuse of process. The mere filing or maintenance of a lawsuit, even for an improper purpose, is not a proper basis for an abuse of process action.

Declining to expand the tort of malicious prosecution, a unanimous California Supreme Court in the case of Sheldon Appel Co. v. Albert & Oliker, 47 Cal. 3d 863, 873 (1989) observed: "While the filing of frivolous lawsuits is certainly improper and cannot in any way be condoned, in our view the better means of addressing the problem of unjustified litigation is through the adoption of measures facilitating the speedy resolution of the initial lawsuit and authorizing the imposition of sanctions for frivolous or delaying conduct within that first action itself, rather than through an expansion of the opportunities for initiating one or more additional rounds of malicious prosecution litigation after the first action has been concluded."

== Origins ==
The tort originates in the (now defunct) legal maxim that "the King pays no costs"; that is, the Crown could not be forced to pay the legal costs of a person it prosecuted, even if that person was found innocent. As The London Magazine stated in 1766: "if a groundless and vexatious prosecution be commenced in the King's name, his ministers who commenced, or advised commencing that prosecution, ought at least to be obliged to pay the costs which an innocent subject has thereby been put to".

== U.S. use of English Rule ==
Sixteen U.S. states require another element of malicious prosecution. This element, commonly called the English Rule, states that, in addition to fulfilling all other malicious prosecution elements, one must also prove injury other than the normal downside of being sued. This rule is limited to equitable damages, such as loss of profit, and excludes damages that cannot be measured by the law (e.g., damage to reputation).

== Canadian law ==
Canadian jurisprudence has changed in that if any individual takes legal action that meets the above criteria, they may be sued. Legal action may be taken against the police or Crown attorneys or the Attorney General, as they are no longer exempt from suit.

The tort of malicious prosecution was reviewed in 2009 by the Supreme Court of Canada in Miazga v. Kvello Estate, and specifically how it applied to public prosecutors in Canada. The court outlined the four required elements for the tort of malicious prosecution: (i) The prosecution must be initiated by the defendant; (ii) The prosecution must be terminated in the plaintiff's favour. (iii) There was a lack of reasonable and probable grounds to commence or continue the prosecution; and (iv) The defendant was motivated to commence or to continue the prosecution due to malice.

In 2014, the Quebec Court of Appeal held that the contents of plea bargaining negotiations held in the context of criminal cases could be admitted as evidence in the context of a civil suit for malicious prosecution, despite the general evidentiary rule prohibiting adducing settlement discussions into proof at trial. More specifically, the Court held that introducing into evidence the contents of such negotiations was possible when it tended to demonstrate that the prosecution initiated or maintained criminal charges on the basis of improper motives.

== Limitations ==
Notably, the tort of malicious prosecution only protects the right of defendants to be free of frivolous lawsuits brought by malicious plaintiffs. For a variety of reasons grounded in public policy, courts have consistently refused to authorize the converse — a tort of malicious defense which would protect the right of plaintiffs to be free of frivolous defenses raised by defendants.

== See also ==
- Barratry (common law)
- Chilling effect
- Frivolous lawsuit
- Immunity from prosecution
- Lawfare
- Legal abuse
- Miscarriage of justice
- Selective prosecution
- Pervert the course of justice
- Strategic lawsuit against public participation
- Vexatious litigation
- Witness tampering
