= Legal terrorism =

Legal terrorism may refer to:

- State-sponsored terrorism
- State terrorism, terrorism carried out by the state itself
- Vexatious litigation, the filing of lawsuits to harass or censor
