= Chutima Sidasathian =

Thai investigative journalist (1982–2026)

- ชุติมา สีดาเสถียร
- Born: 26 March 1982; Non Thai district, Nakhon Ratchasima province, Thailand
- Died: 15 August 2026 (aged 44)
- Citizenship: Thailand
- Education: Phuket Rajabhat University
- Alma mater: Ramkhamhaeng University Walailak University
- Occupation: Journalist
- Employer: Phuketwan

Chutima Sidasathian (Thai: ชุติมา สีดาเสถียร; 26 March 1982 – 15 August 2026) was a Thai journalist. She was known for her investigative reporting on issues of corruption in Thailand.

== Life and career ==
Sidasathian was born in Non Thai district, Nakhon Ratchasima province. She had a bachelor's degree in liberal arts from Phuket Rajabhat University and a master's degree in political science from Ramkhamhaeng University. She successfully obtained a PhD in Asian studies from Walailak University, with her thesis being about Rohingya refugees.

In 2009, Sidasathian received some attention for a series of articles written for the South China Morning Post about the treatment of Boat Dwellers in Hong Kong, which led to authorities there changing policy concerning them. That same year, she started working as an investigative journalist for Phuketwan, an English-language newspaper based in Phuket province, where she frequently wrote about corruption and issues facing the rural population in Thailand, as well as refugees.

=== 2013 investigation into trafficking ===
On 17 July 2013, Sidasathian wrote an article for Phuketwan, based on a report by the international news agency Reuters, about the alleged involvement of officers from the Royal Thai Navy in the trafficking of Rohingya refugees in Southern Thailand. In 2015, Sidasathian and Phuketwan's editor, Alan Morison, were charged with defamation under the Computer Crime Act. On 1 September 2015, Sidasathian and Morison were both acquitted when the case was dismissed by the Phuket Provincial Court. Phuketwan later closed down due to what Sidasathian described as "constant legal harassment".

=== 2022 investigation into corruption ===
In February and April 2022, Sidasathian reported on alleged corruption in Nakhon Ratchasima after learning that villagers were being taken to court to recover debts they allegedly owed to the Government Savings Bank despite having never been given the money. Sidasathian alleged that Thanonthorn Kaveekitrattana, the mayor of Banlang, had misappropriated microcredit funds from the National Village and Urban Community Fund, siphoning millions of baht that was supposed to be loaned to villagers in the area. Sidasathian reported that several families had been driven to financial ruin due to the civil court actions, with at least three villagers dying by suicide, and filed complaints on their behalf with the National Anti-Corruption Commission, the Office of the Ombudsman, the Department of Special Investigation and the National Human Rights Commission. In December 2022, following a criminal complaint by Kaveekitrattana, Sidasathian was arrested, briefly detained, and charged with five counts of defamation, all against Kaveekitrattana.

In 2023, Thailand's National Human Rights Commission ruled that the proceedings against Sidasathian constituted a strategic lawsuit against public participation, litigation intended to silence critics. The trial against Sidasathian still went ahead between 6 and 8 February 2024 at Nakhon Ratchasima Provincial Court. A judge found that three of the defamation charges against Sidasathian were unfounded due to her being entitled to make "genuine criticism" of local administrators, finding her not guilty, though six charges remained pending. Sidasathian's legal team subsequently called on the Nakhon Ratchasima prosecutor to drop the remaining charges against her.

The Thai government went on to establish a Special Commission of Investigation to investigate the banking scandal; the Government Savings Bank also completed its own internal investigation which confirmed Sidasathian's findings.

=== Response ===
Media Defence, a non-governmental press freedom organisation who supported Sidasathian in both her defamation trials, stated that Thai authorities used defamation laws to "intimidate and silence" journalists reporting on corruption.

Article 19 called for the charges against Sidasathian to be immediately dropped.

The International Federation for Human Rights and the World Organisation Against Torture denounced the proceedings against Sidasathian and called for all charges to be dropped.

The Clooney Foundation for Justice stated that Sidasathian's trial indicated an attempt to "suppress her public participation on matters of public interest", though identified that she had received a mostly fair trial.

In 2024, Sidasathian was among the nominees for the Freedom of Expression Award from the Index on Censorship.

=== Death ===
Sidasathian died on 15 August 2026, at the age of 44.
