= Judith Richardson Haimes =

American psychic

Judith Richardson Haimes is an American woman from Philadelphia, Pennsylvania, who worked as a psychic in Newark, Delaware, until an allergic reaction to the iodine tracer injected for a CAT scan allegedly disabled her psychic abilities. She sued Temple University Hospital and was awarded over $600,000 for pain and suffering and loss of income. This award was later overturned on appeal, 39 Pa. D. & C.3d 381 (Pa.Com.Pl. 1986). Haimes currently lives with her husband Allen Haimes in Florida and writes a syndicated newspaper column on grieving.

Haimes' case was the subject of the book Judith by her husband.

The case is often cited in discussions of frivolous lawsuits and tort reform in the United States, but the facts are also often misrepresented. Contrary to popular belief, Haimes never claimed that a CAT scan had caused her to lose her psychic powers. In fact, the often alluded-to CAT scan never took place. Haimes only claimed that the headaches resulting from her allergic reaction prevented her from earning a living as a psychic.

Haimes previously earned a lucrative living by offering sessions in which she ostensibly read individuals' auras, offering them medical as well as personal advice. She gained a reputation following an article in Philadelphia magazine that described seances she conducted at a wealthy Chestnut Hill patron's house.
