= Alexander Chaffers =

Vexatious litigant

Alexander Chaffers was a notorious lawyer who was a party in the scandal of Sir Travers and Lady Twiss in 1872 and was subsequently considered such a vexatious litigant that the Vexatious Actions Act was passed in 1896 to stop him. He died in a workhouse.
