= Isaac Wunder order =

Irish court order against vexatious litigants

An Isaac Wunder order is an order issued by an Irish court restricting the ability of a vexatious litigant to institute legal proceedings without leave from that or another court, whether for a specified period of time or indefinitely. It is named after Isaac Wunder, an Irishman who became notorious for instituting a number of actions that were subsequently deemed by the court to be frivolous or vexatious.

== Origins ==
In the mid-1960s, the plaintiff in Keaveney v. Geraghty sought damages for libel in proceedings before the High Court. The defendant applied for a stay of proceedings on the grounds that they were, inter alia, frivolous and vexatious, and an abuse of process. The court granted the stay, whereupon the plaintiff appealed. The Supreme Court varied the ruling to provide that no further proceedings on the action could be taken without leave of the court.

A few years later, Isaac Wunder sued the Irish Hospitals Trust, also known as the Irish Sweepstake, for claimed sweepstakes winnings. His claims were dismissed as frivolous and vexatious. Wunder appealed. Wunder had made several claims against the defendants on the matter, and in each case the claims had been ruled groundless. In the light of this history of repeated attempts to get a more favourable ruling on the same issue, the Supreme Court issued an order similar to that issued in Keaveney, directing that Wunder could take no further proceedings on the matter at the High Court. Although this was not the first order of its kind issued, it nonetheless became known as the "Isaac Wunder order".

The High Court subsequently described in Riordan v. Ireland (No. 5) the court's inherent jurisdiction to make an order "where the court is satisfied that a person has habitually or persistently instituted vexatious or frivolous civil proceedings". The Court of Appeal endorsed this and confirmed that an order "preserves [the subject's] constitutional right of access to the courts and merely requires that it be exercised only where [they] can satisfy the President of the High Court that [they] ought to be permitted to bring the particular intended proceedings".

== Cases ==
- 2010: John Burke, a farmer from County Tipperary, took seven sets of judicial review proceedings to the High Court, challenging proceedings against him in the District Court and the Circuit Court. The High Court issued an Isaac Wunder order against him, preventing him from taking further such proceedings without leave from the President of the High Court.
- 2010: A married woman, identified only as "LO'M", began separation proceedings in 2000 against her husband, identified only as "JO'M". During the course of the next four years, more than a hundred days were spent on the action. JO'M sued his wife's solicitors for €6 million, claiming conspiracy and extortion. The High Court imposed an Isaac Wunder order, barring him from further proceedings against the solicitors without the court's approval.
- 2017: The High Court issued an Isaac Wunder order against Ruth Moram who had taken a series of cases against the Jehovah's Witnesses and their members in relation to her ejection from the group.
- 2020: In a dispute over 4.5 acres (1.8 ha) of land given by the parents of two brothers to one son in 1981 with an agreement that the parents could live in the dwelling until their death. Upon the death of the last parent in 2010, one of the sons sought to challenge his brother's legal right as the owner of the land. The complainant issued multiple proceedings in high court, circuit court, district court and appealed to the Supreme Court. With the litigation lasting over 10 years and costs exceeding the value of the land, the court issued an Isaac Wunder order to prevent further litigation on the issue. The Court of Appeal later widened the scope of the order and banned the son in question from taking any proceedings against his brother without leave of that court.

== See also ==
- Barratry (common law)
- Frivolous litigation
- Frivolous or vexatious (formal definition)
- Vexatious litigation
- Ben Gilroy
