= George W. Pring =

Professor of Law

George W. "Rock" Pring is a Professor of Law at the University of Denver Sturm College of Law. He coined the acronym SLAPP for "Strategic Lawsuit Against Public Participation" and is the co-author, together with Penelope Canan, of SLAPPs: Getting Sued for Speaking Out.

He graduated from Harvard College and University of Michigan Law School.
