= Travers Twiss =

British legal scholar

Sir Travers Twiss QC FRS
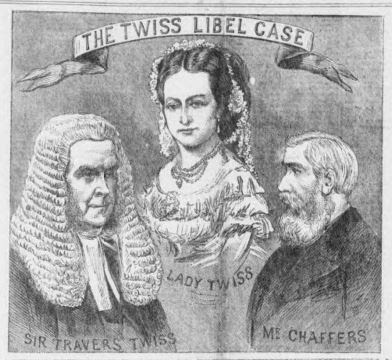
- Born: 19 March 1809; London, England
- Died: 14 January 1897 (aged 87); London, England
- Occupations: Barrister; writer
- Years active: 1809–1897
- Notable work: The Law of Nations in Peace; The Law of Nations in War

Sir Travers Twiss QC FRS (19 March 1809 in London – 14 January 1897 in London) was an English jurist. He had a distinguished academic and legal career culminating in his appointment as Queen's Advocate-General. Twiss was particularly noted for his contribution to the theory of international law. He was widely consulted, and was asked to draw up the constitution of the Congo Free State. A prolific author, Twiss wrote many influential textbooks on legal matters.

His public career came to a sudden end in 1872 after a scandal involving his wife Marie. He continued to research and publish on aspects of international law.

== Academic career ==
Twiss was born in Marylebone in London. He was the eldest son of the Rev. Robert Twiss. At University College, Oxford, he obtained a first-class degree in mathematics and a second in classics in 1830, and was elected a Fellow of his college, of which he was afterwards successively bursar, dean and tutor. During his connection with Oxford, he was, inter alia, a public examiner in classics and mathematics, Drummond Professor of Political Economy (1842), and Regius Professor of Civil Law (1855). In 1862 he married Marie von Lynnseele. Marriage required him to forfeit his fellowship. In compensation he was elected to an Honorary Fellowship of University College.

He published while at Oxford an epitome of Niebuhr's History of Rome, an annotated edition of Livy and other works, but his studies mainly lay in the direction of political economy, law, chiefly international law, and international politics.

He was professor of international law at King's College London (1852–1855).

== Legal career ==
In 1840, he was called to the bar at Lincoln's Inn, and became an advocate at Doctors' Commons. In the ecclesiastical courts he enjoyed a large practice, and filled many of the appointments incidental thereto, such as commissary-general of the city and diocese of Canterbury (1849), vicar-general to the archbishop (1852) and Chancellor of the diocese of London (1858). In 1858, when the Probate and Divorce Acts of 1857 came into force, and the ecclesiastical jurisdiction of Doctors' Commons had died, Twiss, like many other leading advocates of Doctors' Commons, became a QC, and in the same year was also elected a bencher of his Inn.

His successful career continued in the civil courts, and in addition to his large practice he was appointed in 1862 Advocate-General to the Admiralty, and in 1867 Queen's Advocate-General. In 1867, he was also knighted. He served during his legal career upon a great number of royal commissions, such as the Maynooth Commission in 1854, and others dealing with marriage law, neutrality, naturalisation and allegiance. His reputation abroad led to his being invited in 1884 by Leopold II, king of the Belgians, to draw up the constitution of the Congo Free State.

He was elected a Fellow of the Royal Society in March 1838.

== Scandal ==
In 1871, Twiss became involved in a scandal, which brought his career to an end. In 1862 he had married the 22-year-old Marie van Lynnseele, who he presented as the daughter of a Polish aristocrat. A solicitor named Alexander Chaffers claimed that Marie was in reality a French former prostitute who went by the name "Marie Gelas", and had been Twiss's mistress before their marriage. Chaffers, who also claimed to have been one of her lovers, was allegedly blackmailing her, sending her bills for imaginary "services rendered", which she initially paid. When she refused to pay any more, Chaffers made a statutory declaration about her, which he sent to various bishops and to the Lord Chamberlain. Charges of libel were brought against Chaffers, but were dropped when Marie Twiss broke down under ruthless cross-examination by Chaffers and then fled the country. Twiss was humiliated. He resigned from all his appointments and lived in retirement in London until his death. He never again saw his wife. Chaffers' subsequent vexatious litigation led to the passing of the Vexatious Actions Act in 1896.

Twiss continued to research and publish on aspects of international law and kindred topics. Among his more notable publications of this period were The Law of Nations in Peace and The Law of Nations in War.

== Bibliography ==
Published works, written by Travers Twiss, include:

- 1846: The Oregon Territory : Its History and Discovery. New York : Appleton.
- 1847: View of the Progress of Political Economy in Europe since the Sixteenth Century. London : Longman, Brown, Green, and Longmans.
- 1861: The law of nations considered as independent political communities : on the rights and duties of nations in time of peace. Oxford : Clarendon Press.
- 1871: Monumenta juridica : the black book of the admiralty. London : Longman & Co.
- 1879: On international conventions for the maintenance of sea-lights. Paper presented at the Seventh Annual Conference of the Association for the Reform and Codification of the Law of Nations.

Legal offices
| Preceded by Robert Joseph Phillimore | Admiralty Advocate; 1862–1867 | Succeeded by James Parker Deane |
| Preceded by Robert Joseph Phillimore | Queen's Advocate; 1867–1872 | Succeeded by vacant |
