= This is True =

This Is True is a syndicated weekly newspaper column and electronic mailing list written by American humorist and journalist Randy Cassingham. The column describes strange-but-true stories culled from news sources around the globe, each ending with a humorous observation. Cassingham reports that there are more than 44,000 subscribers to the mailing list for True.

Frequent themes in This is True include absurd governmental actions or policies, unusual or badly phrased newspaper headlines, and injuries and deaths due to outrageous negligence (similar to the Darwin Awards). Cassingham particularly favors stories of outrageous effects of zero tolerance policies in schools, such as children expelled (under drugs rules) for sharing cough drops.

Cassingham has been criticized for repeating myths and lies regarding many of the stories published in "This is True".
