= SPEAK FREE Act of 2015 =

U.S. proposed legislation concerning speech lawsuits

SPEAK FREE Act
- Other short titles: Securing Participation, Engagement, and Knowledge Freedom by Reducing Egregious Efforts Act of 2015
- Long title: To amend title 28, United States Code, to create a special motion to dismiss strategic lawsuits against public participation (SLAPP suits).
- Nicknames: Speak Free Act

Codification
- Titles amended: 28
- U.S.C. sections amended: 182 USC §4201, 182 USC §4202, 182 USC §4203, 182 USC §4204, 182 USC §4205, 182 USC §4206, 182 USC §4207, 182 USC §4208

Legislative history
- Introduced in the House of Representatives as H.R. 2304 by Blake Farenthold (R–TX-27) on May 13, 2015; Committee consideration by United States House Judiciary Subcommittee on the Constitution and Civil Justice and United States House Committee on the Judiciary

The SPEAK FREE Act of 2015 (H.R. 2304) was a bipartisan legislative bill introduced in the 114th United States Congress in May 2015, and designed to serve as federal anti-SLAPP legislation, to protect free speech in practice. Its title is an acronym (S.P.E.A.K. F.R.E.E.) that stands for "Securing Participation, Engagement, and Knowledge Freedom by Reducing Egregious Efforts Act of 2015". In June 2015, the bill was referred to the Judiciary Subcommittee on the Constitution and Civil Justice, where it stalled until expiring at the end of the 114th Congress.

== Details ==
The bill was designed to prevent SLAPP lawsuits (strategic lawsuit against public participation), which are often brought to silence critics. SLAPP suits are used as legal retaliation, by burdening them with the costs of a legal defense, until they abandon their criticism.

== Background ==
In response to several notable SLAPP abuses in recent times, United States Representative Blake Farenthold (R-TX), along with 20 Democrat and 11 Republican co-sponsors, introduced the SPEAK FREE Act to dismiss lawsuits which are used to harass plaintiffs. The SPEAK FREE Act was formed by observing what has been shown to work, after being previously implemented in over twenty States where anti-SLAPP legislation had already been tested.

With the looming prospect that Donald Trump might become President, Congress decided to address the SPEAK FREE Act, with the bill's sponsor, Rep. Farenthold (R), stating, "Obama will sign this. I don’t think Trump will."

== Judiciary hearing ==
On June 22, 2016, the House Judiciary Committee held a hearing on the bill. Witnesses who gave testimony included Aaron Schur (Senior Director of Litigation of Yelp), Bruce Brown (Reporters Committee for Freedom of the Press), Alexander A. Reinert (Professor of Law at Cardozo), and Laura Prather (partner of Haynes and Boone, LLP).

== Response ==
The bill was praised for its bipartisan support in protecting free speech by the Public Participation Project, the Electronic Frontier Foundation, and Yelp, among others, as the bill is also geared toward protecting online criticism.

== See also ==
- Censorship
- Legal burden of proof
- Strategic lawsuit against public participation
