= Frivolous or vexatious =

Term used to deny a complaint

In law, frivolous or vexatious is a term used to challenge a complaint or a legal proceeding being heard as lacking in merit, or to deny, dismiss or strike out any ensuing judicial or non-judicial processes.

The term is used in several jurisdictions, such as England and Wales, Ireland, Canada and New Zealand. While the term is referenced in laws and regulations, it is often not defined by statute, being developed instead by decisions of the courts.

== General meaning ==
"Frivolous" and "vexatious" generally mean different things, however both are typically grouped together as they relate to the same basic concept of a claim or complaint (or a series of many) not being brought in good faith:

- A "frivolous" claim or complaint is one that has no serious purpose or value. Often a frivolous claim is one about a matter that is so trivial, meritless on its face, or without substance that investigation would be disproportionate in terms of time and cost. The implication is that the claim has not been brought in good faith because it clearly has no reasonable prospect of success and/or is not significant enough to warrant its mention.
- A "vexatious" claim or complaint is one being pressed specifically to cause harassment, annoyance, frustration, worry, or even bring financial cost (such as the engagement of a defence lawyer) to their defendant or respondent.

== In Ireland ==
=== Meaning ===
The term is not defined in statute law, but has been defined in legal cases. One case was Keaveney v. Geraghty, where the plaintiff's libel proceedings were stayed on the grounds that they were, among other things, frivolous, vexatious, and "an abuse of the process of the Court". The plaintiff was effectively declared a vexatious litigant.

A case is frivolous if it has no reasonable chance of succeeding, and is vexatious if it would bring hardship on the opposite party to defend against an unnecessary and inevitably unsuccessful claim.

=== Usage ===
The term is used in many Acts of the Oireachtas and statutory instruments. For example, the Data Protection Commissioner shall investigate any complaint made to him about the contravention of the Data Protection Acts unless he is of the opinion that it is frivolous or vexatious and the head of a government department may refuse access to records under the Freedom of Information Act if the request is frivolous or vexatious. The High Court and Supreme Court may order judgement to be entered on an action or for it to be stayed or dismissed where an action or defence is frivolous or vexatious.

== See also ==
- Barratry (common law)
- Frivolous litigation
- Vexatious litigation
- Isaac Wunder order
