= Randy Cassingham =

American syndicated columnist, humorist, publisher, and speaker

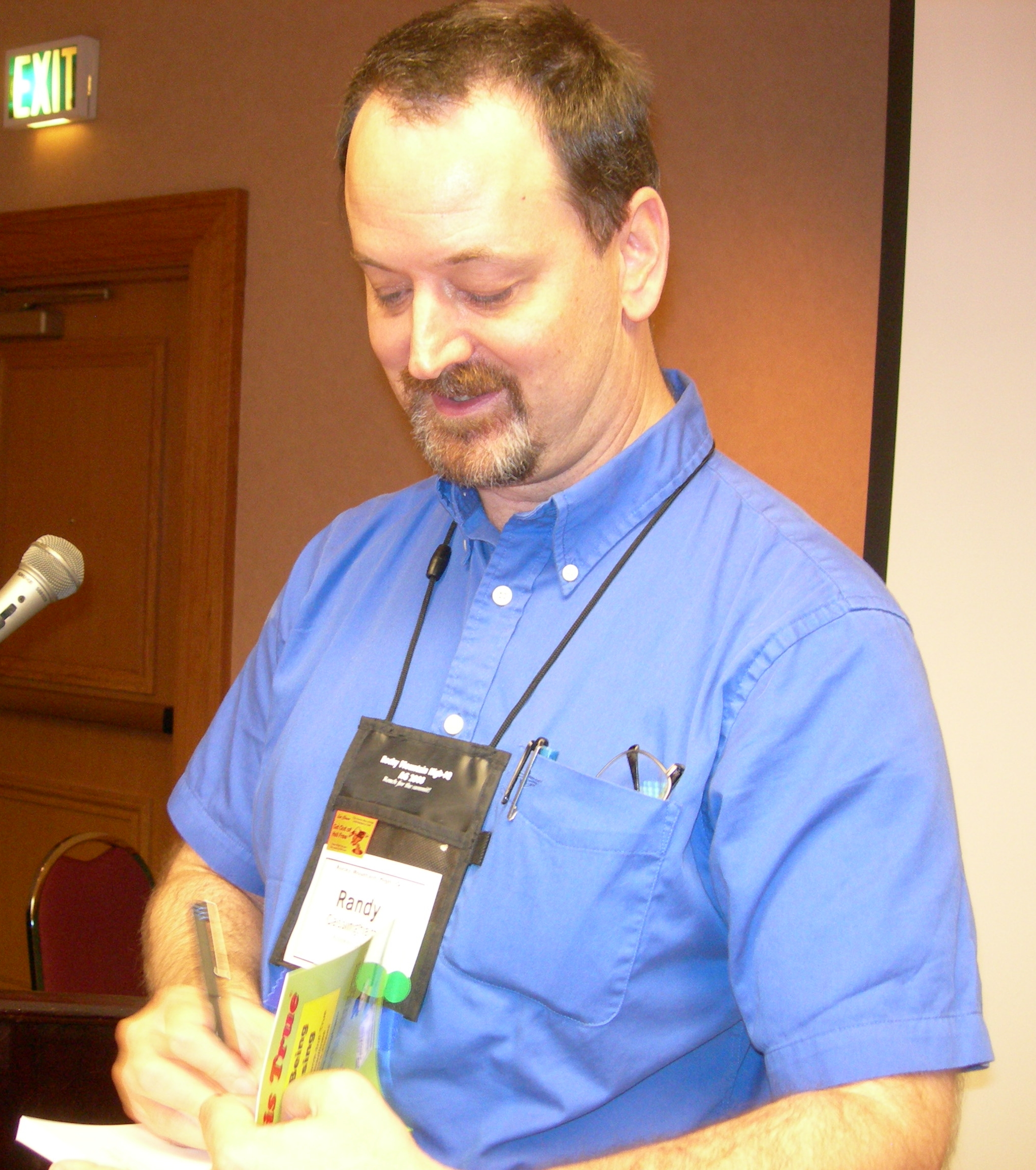
Randy Cassingham at 2008 American Mensa Annual Gathering

Randy C Cassingham (1959 in California, USA) is an American syndicated columnist, humorist, publisher, and speaker. He is a former member of the Society of Professional Journalists. He has been the keynote speaker at several of The Skeptics Society's annual conventions.

Cassingham is the author of the weekly syndicated news column This is True (founded 1994), which Cassingham made available by e-mail subscription to become one of the first for-profit e-mailed newsletters on the Internet. (In January 1997, an expanded paid version became one of the first paid e-mailed newsletters on the Internet.) "This is True" features several actual news items each week of unbelievable-yet-true character, with each story capped by a pithy one-liner which is "humorous, ironic or opinionated."

Cassingham is the creator of the "Get Out of Hell Free" card (his response to a This is True reader who complained that a story about Feng Shui was "anti-Christian" and told him he was going to hell), the Internet Spam Primer, and several other web sites. Cassingham also started the "HeroicStories" e-mail newsletter (founded 1999), which tells the stories of remarkable acts of kindness and courage. Management of "HeroicStories" has since been turned over to others.

Cassingham was a volunteer emergency medical First Responder for the area around his home in rural Western Colorado. He has been married to Kathryn Anne ("Kit") Riley since 2001.

Randy Cassingham and his wife sold and exited their Colorado home on September 27, 2023. They then had to wait over a year before they could enter their new home -- the Villa Vie Residence's cruise line's Odyssey ship.

They reportedly paid approximately $360K to $370K plus $7K per month to reside on the ship and travel to various destinations on it.

At the end of October 2026 the Odyssey cruise —which had been billed as a three to three and a half year around the world trip planning to visit 147 countries and 425+ different ports— came to a premature end when the Villa Vie Residence's cruise line ran out of money purportedly due to increasing fuel costs. While docked at the Cambodian port city Sihanoukville, the two hundred plus cruising customers ("residents") were notified that they needed to leave the ship after Villa Vie had suspended company operations.

== Stella Awards ==
Cassingham is also the Founder of the "True Stella Awards", a web site dedicated to informing the public about allegedly frivolous legal cases. The site was expanded into a 2005 book of the same name, published by Dutton, an imprint of the Penguin Group. The awards were given between 2002 and 2007 to people who filed "outrageous and frivolous lawsuits". Imitation being the sincerest form of flattery, several false Stella Awards circulate on the Internet.

The awards were named after Stella Liebeck who, in 1992, received third degree burns to her thighs and genitals after ordering a cup of McDonald's coffee at a drive thru, putting it in between her knees while sitting in the passenger seat of her grandson's stationary car, and attempted to remove the lid in order to add cream and sugar. The coffee was at 180 to 190 °F (82 to 88 °C), a temperature which the restaurant was aware had caused burns to more than 700 people; after McDonald's refused to pay for her skin grafts, and rejected several attempts at mediation and settlement, Liebeck sued, winning the lawsuit and being awarded $640,000. (The amount originally awarded by the jury was over $2.9 million but it was reduced by the judge. The final amount that she got remains unknown, since it resulted from a confidential post-trial settlement between Liebeck and McDonald's.)

In July 2012, Cassingham sent a message to the True Stella Awards mailing list, announcing that after several abortive attempts to restart the list he came to the conclusion that he had said everything about the subject of frivolous lawsuits that he had intended to say, and so was shutting down the Stella Awards.

Cassingham has been criticized for repeating lies and rumors regarding Liebeck v. McDonald's Restaurants, specifically that she had the cup between her legs while driving.

== Published work ==
- The True Stella Awards : Honoring real cases of greedy opportunists, frivolous lawsuits, and the law run amok. Dutton Adult. November 2005. ISBN 0-525-94913-5.
