= Civil restraint order =

Legal order in the UK prohibiting a person from pursuing vexatious litigation

In the law of England and Wales, a civil restraint order (CRO) is a court order intended to prevent vexatious litigation. Courts have the means of escalating the sanctions against a litigant who makes applications to the court that are "totally without merit":

There are three types of CRO: limited, extended and general, with different scopes of application:

- a limited civil restraint order (formerly a Grepe v. Loam order) where two or more applications totally without merit are made in a single proceedings. No further application may be made in the proceedings without the permission of the court.
- an extended civil restraint order (formerly an Ebert order) for "persistently vexatious behaviour" lasts for a specified period of no more than three years for "applications touching upon instant matters" and can only be granted by a judge of the Court of Appeal, High Court or a designated civil judge.
- a general civil restraint order (formerly a Bhamjee order) for a maximum of three years for all proceedings in the High Court or specified county courts.

Further applications totally without merit can lead to withdrawal of the right of appeal. Harassment of the court and court officials can lead to a penal prohibition notice, prohibiting the litigant from contacting or approaching the court without permission.

HM Courts Service maintains a list of vexatious litigants.

== See also ==
- Vexatious litigant
