= Leo Stoller =

American patent troll

- Born: June 5, 1946 (age 80)
- Known for: Trademark litigation

Leo D. Stoller (born June 5, 1946) is an American self-styled "intellectual property entrepreneur" based in suburban Chicago, Illinois. Stoller claimed rights to a large inventory of well-known trademarks and engaged in the assertive enforcement of those alleged trademark rights, threatening infringement action against people and companies who attempt to use similar marks.

Though he managed to obtain license payments in some circumstances through demand letters, Stoller lost some key challenges in federal court, and was sanctioned by United States regulators for filing thousands of motions. A federal court labeled Stoller and his companies as "vexatious litigants" in 2005, and his bankruptcy filing from that year was converted to a liquidation in 2006 after the judge found Stoller's filing to have been made in bad faith. On August 8, 2007, the bankruptcy court approved the sale of Stoller's trademark assets to the Society for the Prevention of Trademark Abuse, LLC.

== Background ==
Stoller's companies included Rentamark.com, Stealth Industries Inc., S Industries Inc., Sentra Sporting Goods U.S.A., and Central Manufacturing Company. Through these companies, Stoller has registered trademarks with the United States Patent and Trademark Office (USPTO) for over 25 years including Stealth, Sentra, Dark Star, Air Frame, Triana, Stradivarius, Havoc, Chestnut, Trillium, White Line Fever, Fire Power, Love Your Body, and many others.

Stoller has filed oppositions to others' trademark applications with the USPTO Trademark Trial and Appeal Board (TTAB) numerous times, and filed applications for extension of the deadline to file such oppositions even more times. Stoller claims a number of large and small companies have resolved trademark controversies. When approaching infringers, Stoller is reported to document his claims with copies of letters which demonstrate capitulation with his demands. Such letters are said to be from companies such as K-Mart, and often marked "Confidential".

A list of thousands of proceedings involving Leo Stoller and his companies (Stealth Industries, Inc., Leo Stoller Stealth Industries Inc., Leo Stoller Central Mfg. Co, Central Mfg. Co., Central Mfg. Inc., Sentra Industries Inc.) can be found in the USPTO site.

Articles about Stoller have appeared in The New York Times and the Chicago Sun-Times. He has been quoted in the Wall Street Journal and interviewed on Fox News, CBS News and talk radio programs.

== Notable litigation ==
=== 9/11 charity charges ===
In August 2002 the Illinois Attorney General filed suit against Stoller for illegally soliciting funds on behalf of victims of the September 11, 2001, attacks via his web site giveagiftonline.com. Twelve charities Stoller listed said they never received any money from Stoller, despite assurances on the site that "100 percent of all donations" would be forwarded. He was accused of not being a licensed charitable organization and listing charities without their permission. Stoller paid a $2,000 fine and was barred from soliciting for charities in Illinois, but made no admission of wrongdoing.

=== Trademark litigation ===
==== S Industries, Inc. v. Centra 2000 ====
In 1996 S Industries, Inc. filed suit alleging that Centra 2000, a producer of data management software, infringed its/Stoller's "Sentra" trademark in violation of the Lanham Act. District Judge George W. Lindberg ruled in favor of Centra 2000, finding that S Industries did not hold a federal registration for the "Sentra" mark for use on computer hardware or software. Because S Industries' claims were, in the judge's view, completely unfounded and because its procedural maneuvering multiplied the cost of defending against the suit, Centra 2000 was awarded attorney's fees in July 1998. This was affirmed on appeal.

==== Columbia Pictures v. Stoller ====
When Columbia Pictures brought out the 2005 movie Stealth, Stoller attempted to force the movie studio to change the name of the movie or pay him royalties, but the studio responded by suing Stoller for declarative relief. The court entered a consent judgment and permanent injunction in favor of Columbia Pictures and against Stoller in November 2005. In December 2006, the parties stipulated to the dismissal of Stoller's counterclaims, and the case was closed in January 2007.

==== Central Manufacturing Co. v. Brett ====
A case decided by summary judgment on September 30, 2005, Central Manufacturing Co. v. Brett, pitted a Stoller-owned company against Hall-of-Fame baseball player George Brett, whose company, Brett Brothers Sports International Inc., sells a bat under the name "Stealth". It was alleged in this case that the use of that name infringed upon Stoller's trademark rights.

In its decision, the United States District Court for the Northern District of Illinois determined that there was no likelihood of confusion where consumers would mistakenly regard Brett's bats as being from Stoller's company. The court also found that Stoller failed to provide adequate proof that his company and its licensees had even sold baseball-related merchandise at all. The court found likelihood of confusion in the opposite direction, found Brett's trademark rights to be senior, and hence canceled Stoller's (Central Manufacturing) registration. In the decision, the court described Stoller's tactics and enumerated dozens of unsuccessful infringement cases he had brought in that court.

Chief Judge Charles P. Kocoras from the Northern District of Illinois then issued a citation to Stoller after reviewing his "filing history" having filed at least "49 lawsuits in this court, individually or through one of his many wholly owned corporations". "The Executive Committee (of the Northern District of Illinois) in its capacity as the supervisor of the assignment of cases, has directed that Leo Stoller inform this court of any claim by him why the Executive Committee should not impose reasonable and necessary restraints upon Mr. Stoller's ability to file civil cases in this District." After a thorough review of Leo Stoller's entire filing history the Executive Committee of the Northern District of Illinois issued a decision stating that "the committee will take no further action in this matter."

On July 9, 2007, in an opinion that opened with a laudatory description of the George Brett "Pine Tar Incident", the United States Court of Appeals for the Seventh Circuit affirmed the District Court's judgment, including the order for Stoller to pay Brett's attorney fees.

==== Central Mfg. Co. v. Pure Fishing, Inc. ====
Stoller and the "Central Mfg. Co. (a Delaware corporation)" sued a fishing tackle company, Pure Fishing, Inc. in February 2005 in Illinois for selling Spiderwire Stealth fishing line. Pure Fishing denied infringement and counterclaimed alleging that Stoller's trademark business violated various state and federal laws against unfair business practices. Pure Fishing also acquired and asserted in another counterclaim (piercing the corporate veil and continuation of business theories) the unsatisfied 1998 sanction judgment that had been awarded to Centra 2000 against Stoller's S Industries, Inc. Pure Fishing also showed that Stoller had signed his attorney's name to pleadings that were filed with the court. Stoller's case was dismissed with prejudice and default judgments entered against all corporate defendants for lack of prosecution and against Stoller as a sanction under Rule 11.

During Stoller's 2006 bankruptcy proceedings (see below), Pure Fishing went back to the district court for entry of a Final Judgment. On October 4, 2006, a federal court in Chicago entered final judgment in Central Mfg. Co., et al. v. Pure Fishing, Inc., et al. The Court declared the case to be "exceptional" under 15 U.S.C. § 1117(a) and ordered Central Mfg. to pay Pure Fishing’s costs, charges and disbursements, including a reasonable attorneys' fees, incurred in the action. The court further ordered that Stoller and his companies were "vexatious litigants" and barred them "from instituting any lawsuit or trademark opposition without prior leave of this Court pursuant to this Court’s authority under the All Writs Act, 28 U.S.C. § 1651(a)." The court also cancelled the marks asserted in the Complaint. Stoller filed a Notice of Appeal from the October 4 judgment and has moved to stay the enforcement of the said judgment pending the appeals.

On December 12, 2006, the Court entered judgment in favor of Pure Fishing, Inc. in the total amount of $969,751.81.

==== Target and Google trademark claims ====
Stoller filed an opposition with the Trademark Trial and Appeal Board (TTAB) in April 2006 to the Target Stores bullseye logo.

In 2006, Stoller filed an opposition to Google's attempt at registering a trademark to the name "Google" in the category of exercise balls. Stoller claims that the "Google" mark has become generic, yet also claims that it infringes on prior alleged rights to the name held by Stoller's company. The case against the Google mark, however, was dismissed with prejudice at the instigation of Stoller's trustee in bankruptcy, who is empowered to take action in all cases in which Stoller and his companies are involved. Subsequently, on January 19, 2007, Google filed a suit against Stoller's companies alleging violations of the anti-racketeering RICO law.

On April 2, 2008 the Seventh Circuit Court of Appeals reversed a judgment in favor of Google, on the ground that the case had been pursued using contradictory principles, both treating those companies as extensions of Stoller himself, and as separate legal entities. The case was remanded to the lower court for further action. The court noted, however, that Stoller remained subject to an order "directing that all federal courts in [the Seventh Circuit] return unfiled any papers he submits directly or indirectly unless and until he pays a $10,000 fine we imposed against him in August 2007," and "he will have to pay the outstanding sanction or, as a practical matter, face certain default."

==== Other trademark activity ====
On March 17, 2008, an entity calling itself the "Stoller Pension and Profit Sharing Plan" filed Application Serial No. 77/424,372 in the USPTO, claiming trademark rights to the word "Stealth" in the fields of boat accessories and various forms of sports equipment and apparel, with a first use in commerce dating back to 1981. This organization has filed a property tort suit against Countrywide Bank.

=== Sanctions ===
Several jurisdictions have imposed sanctions against Stoller in response to the cases and motions he has brought, and his conduct in prosecuting them.

- U.S. Patent and Trademark Office Trademark Trial and Appeal Board: In a July 14, 2006 order by the Trademark Trial and Appeal Board (TTAB), Stoller was sanctioned by the Board for filing more than 1100 requests of an extension of time to file oppositions for time period between November 2005 and March 2006. The Board vacated all the time extensions filed during that time period and prohibits Stoller from filing any additional extensions for two years. Stoller will be able to file extensions again after two years but only if the extension is filed by an attorney. The appeal to the Court of Appeals for the Federal Circuit was dismissed for lack of jurisdiction. The time for filing any appeal to the district court has lapsed.
- U.S. District Court for the Northern District of Illinois: On March 8, 2007, the Executive Committee for the U.S. District Court for the Northern District of Illinois sanctioned Stoller and entered an injunction precluding him from filing any further lawsuits without first obtaining leave of court.
- U.S. Court of Appeals for the Seventh Circuit: On August 23, 2007, the United States Court of Appeals for the Seventh Circuit imposed a $10,000 fine on Stoller. Stoller's sanction included an order requiring that all courts within the Seventh Circuit not to accept any papers filed by Stoller, until the fine was paid. In April 2008, the court noted that the sanction remained outstanding.
- U.S. Supreme Court: On May 27, 2008, the United States Supreme Court denied Stoller's motion to proceed in forma pauperis and dismissed his petition for certiorari. The court noted that he had "repeatedly abused this Court's process," and directed its clerk not to accept any further filings from Stoller in noncriminal matters unless Stoller made a complete filing in accordance with Supreme Court Rule 33.1 (i.e., forty copies in typeset booklet form) and accompanied by the required filing fee.
- Other sanctions: In addition to being fined and sanctioned, Stoller or his entities have been ordered to pay their opponents' attorneys' fees in at least seven reported cases.

=== Bankruptcy filings ===
On March 1, 1985, Stoller filed for Chapter 13 relief in the U.S. Bankruptcy Court for the Northern District of Illinois, Case No. 85-02729.

On March 23, 1998, Stoller filed for bankruptcy in the Northern District of Illinois, Case No. 98-03288 (later withdrawn).

In 2001, Stoller made a bankruptcy filing for his litigation entity, S Industries, Inc., that was filed during the appeal of the S Industries, Inc. v. Centra 2000 decision (N.D. Ill. 1998) that had levied sanctions against S Industries for oppressive litigation.

On December 20, 2005, Stoller filed a voluntary petition for relief under Chapter 13, before a final judgment could be entered in the Pure Fishing case. His petition listed $183,000 in general unsecured claims. This had the effect of an automatic stay on the litigation. Although the case against the corporate entities might have continued, Judge Lindberg stayed the case against those entities as well "in view of the unique relationship" between Stoller and his corporate entities. Pure Fishing filed a claim in the bankruptcy case and asked the court to convert Stoller's case from Chapter 13 (debtor controlled reorganization) to Chapter 7 (liquidation), with the immediate appointment of a trustee to manage the financial estate. Following a trial on the motion in August 2006, the case was immediately converted with trustee Richard M. Fogel appointed on September 5, 2006. The detailed opinion by Judge Jack B. Schmetterer of the bankruptcy court spells out in great detail how Stoller operated his business. A Notice of Appeal was filed by Stoller, who also moved to stay all proceedings pending resolution of his appeal. Stoller has also moved to disqualify the trustee on the grounds that he is biased and prejudiced against Stoller and not operating within the best interest of the estate. The court denied Stoller's motion, and Stoller's appeal was denied.

On October 5, 2006, trustee Richard M. Fogel's authority was extended to include actions as sole shareholder of all corporate entities owned or controlled by Stoller, thus relieving Stoller of his ability to act as a representative of his corporations or proprietorships.

On August 8, 2007, the bankruptcy court approved an auction and sale under which Stoller's trademark assets were transferred to the Society for the Prevention of Trademark Abuse, LLC, the sole bidder in the auction, for $7,500.

=== Criminal actions ===
On December 15, 2010, Stoller was indicted on federal fraud charges related to his bankruptcy filings. He was arraigned on January 12, 2011, and a public defender was appointed to represent him. On November 30, 2011, judge Virginia Kendall set a trial date of April 23, 2012. On April 13, Stoller entered into a plea agreement pleading guilty to "knowingly and fraudulently making a false statement under penalty of perjury in a Chapter 13 bankruptcy proceeding," in violation of 18 U.S.C. § 152(3).

In September 2012, Judge Kendall was revealed to be among the candidates being considered for the position of U.S. Attorney for the Northern District of Illinois, causing all of her criminal cases to be transferred to other judges to avoid any appearance of a conflict of interest. As part of the reassignment, Stoller's case was temporarily transferred to U.S. District Court Judge Rebecca R. Pallmeyer; it was returned to Kendall on November 7 after the District Court's Executive committee determined she was no longer under consideration for the appointment. In addition, Stoller's counsel withdrew from representation, and new counsel was appointed. On October 26, Judge Pallmeyer struck the scheduled sentencing hearing and ordered a new status hearing for December 10, 2012 which was subsequently continued by Kendall.

On June 27, 2013, Stoller filed a motion to withdraw his guilty plea. Judge Kendall denied the motion, calling it "frivolous", on October 9.

The preliminary finding under the United States Federal Sentencing Guidelines is a range of 30 to 37 months imprisonment, in addition to any court-imposed supervised release, fine or restitution. The prosecution asked for Stoller to be sentenced to 37 months in prison, based on Stoller's "egregious and ceaseless abuse of the federal court system" and because there is "nothing about the defendant’s history and characteristics that suggests that he will not re-offend in the future." Stoller also agreed to pay restitution under 18 U.S.C. § 3663A to the bankruptcy estate according to a schedule to be set by the court.

On November 14, 2014, Judge Kendall sentenced Stoller to 20 months in a federal prison, to be served in a medical facility, as well as a $100 fine. He was ordered to surrender to the Federal Bureau of Prisons on January 16, 2015.

On November 24, Stoller gave notice that he was appealing the judgment to the Seventh Circuit Court of Appeals. The Seventh Circuit noted that "based on prior filings in which he made false representations about his indigency, appellant Leo Stoller is subjected to a filing restriction and is not permitted to proceed in forma pauperis in any federal court in this circuit," and, although the order did not apply to criminal cases, ordered that if Stoller were to attempt to proceed in forma pauperis, he would need to prove eligibility to a United States magistrate judge. In December 2014, Stoller filed a motion to proceed in forma pauperis, and the Court of Appeals referred the matter to Geraldine Soat Brown, United States magistrate judge for the Northern District of Illinois, to make a determination. The court granted the motion on March 5. Oral argument of the appeal was held on December 7, 2015 before circuit judges Joel Flaum, Ann Claire Williams, and Diane Sykes.

Stoller was released from prison on May 20, 2016. A month after his release, the Seventh Circuit panel unanimously affirmed his conviction. On July 11, Stoller petitioned the Seventh Circuit for an en banc rehearing. His petition was denied on July 26. On December 16, 2016, Stoller, acting as his own attorney, petitioned the U.S. Supreme Court to review his case. His petition was denied on February 21, 2017.

In 2018 Leo Stoller filed a motion asking the district court to clarify whether, as a convicted felon, he could possess archery equipment, BB guns, or pellet guns. The district court dismissed the motion for lack of jurisdiction. Stoller appealed to the 7th Circuit, which affirmed the district court’s decision in June 2019.

== See also ==
- Trademark troll
- Edge Games
