= Strategic lawsuit against public participation =

Litigation to intimidate critics

Strategic lawsuits against public participation (also known as SLAPP suits or intimidation lawsuits), or strategic litigation against public participation, are lawsuits intended to censor, intimidate, and silence critics by burdening them with the cost of a legal defense until they abandon their criticism or opposition.

In a typical SLAPP, the plaintiff does not normally expect to win the lawsuit. The plaintiff's goals are accomplished if the defendant succumbs to fear, intimidation, mounting legal costs, or simple exhaustion and abandons the criticism. In some cases, particularly in the context of investigative journalism, repeated frivolous litigation against a defendant may raise the cost of retaining the services of directors and officers and other liability insurance for that party, interfering with an organization's ability to operate. A SLAPP may also intimidate others from participating in the debate. A SLAPP is often preceded by a legal threat. SLAPPs bring about freedom of speech concerns by their chilling effect and are often difficult to filter out and penalize because the plaintiffs attempt to obfuscate their intent to censor, intimidate, or silence their critics.

== Characteristics ==
SLAPP is a form of strategic litigation or impact litigation in which the plaintiff does not have true legal claims but is focused on deterring a message that they do not like. A common feature of SLAPPs is forum shopping, wherein plaintiffs find courts that are more favourable towards the claims to be brought than the venue in which the defendant (or sometimes plaintiffs) live.

Other widely mentioned elements of a SLAPP are the actual effectiveness at silencing critics, timing of the suit, inclusion of extra or spurious defendants (such as relatives or hosts of legitimate defendants), inclusion of plaintiffs with no real claim (such as corporations that are affiliated with legitimate plaintiffs), making claims that are very difficult to disprove or rely on no written record, ambiguous or deliberately distorted wording that lets plaintiffs make spurious allegations without fear of perjury, refusal to consider any settlement (or none other than cash), characterization of all offers to settle as insincere, extensive and unnecessary demands for discovery, attempts to identify anonymous or pseudonymous critics, appeals on minor points of law, and demands for broad rulings when appeal is accepted on such minor points of law. In some instances it is clear that plaintiffs are attempting to drain defendants of their financial resources by making the lawsuit as costly as possible, and in these cases the plaintiff's motive may not be legal victory, but merely to waste the defendant's time and money.

When SLAPPs involve copyright law, they can be considered a type of censorship by copyright.

== History ==
The acronym was coined in the 1980s by the University of Denver professors Penelope Canan and George W. Pring. The term was originally defined as "a lawsuit involving communications made to influence a governmental action or outcome, which resulted in a civil complaint or counterclaim filed against nongovernment individuals or organizations on a substantive issue of some public interest or social significance." The concept's originators later dropped the notion that government contact had to be about a public issue to be protected by the right to petition the government, as provided in the First Amendment to the United States Constitution. It has since been defined less broadly by some US states, and more broadly in one state (California) where it includes suits about speech on any public issue.

The original conceptualization proffered by Canan and Pring emphasized the right to petition as protected in the US under its Constitution's specific protection in the First Amendment's fifth clause. It is still definitional: SLAPPs are civil lawsuits filed against those who have communicated to government officialdom (in some part of its entire constitutional apparatus). The right to petition, granted by the English King Edgar the Peaceful in the 10th century antedates Magna Carta in terms of its significance in the development of democratic institutions. As currently conceived, the right claims that democracy cannot properly function in the presence of barriers between the governed and the governing.

New York Supreme Court Judge J. Nicholas Colabella said in reference to SLAPPs: "Short of a gun to the head, a greater threat to First Amendment expression can scarcely be imagined." In the US a number of jurisdictions have made such suits illegal, but the conditions that a defendant must satisfy for a dismissal of the suit vary from state to state. In some states, such as California, defendants may be entitled to counter-sue SLAPP plaintiffs under some circumstances. This is commonly referred to as SLAPPback.

== Jurisdictional variations ==
=== Australia ===
In the Australian Capital Territory, the Protection of Public Participation Act 2008 (ACT) protects conduct intended to influence public opinion or promote or further action in relation to an issue of public interest. A party starting or maintaining a proceeding against a defendant for an improper purpose may be ordered to pay a financial penalty to the territory.

=== Canada ===
Canada's three most populous provinces (Quebec, British Columbia, and Ontario) have enacted laws protecting defendants from SLAPP suits (known as "anti-SLAPP" legislation).

==== British Columbia ====
Since the repeal, BC activists especially the BCCLA have argued repeatedly for a broad understanding of SLAPP and a broad interpretation of judicial powers especially in intervener applications in BC and other common law jurisdictions and when arguing for new legislation to prevent SLAPPs. The activist literature contains extensive research on particular cases and criteria. The West Coast Environmental Law organization agrees and generally considers BC to lag other jurisdictions.

In March 2019, the legislature voted unanimously to pass another anti-SLAPP bill, the Protection of Public Participation Act.

==== Manitoba ====
Manitoba enacted The Public Interest Expression Defence Act in 2025. It is similar to the British Colombia's Protection of Public Participation Act, except without the provision covering qualified privilege on matters of public interest.

==== Nova Scotia ====
A private member's bill introduced in 2001 by Graham Steele (NDP, Halifax Fairview) proposed a "Protection of Public Participation Act" to dismiss proceedings or claims brought or maintained for an improper purpose, awarding punitive or exemplary damages (effectively, a "SLAPP back") and protection from liability for communication or conduct which constitutes public participation. The bill did not progress beyond first reading.

==== Ontario ====
By 2010, the Ontario attorney-general had issued a major report which identified SLAPP as a major problem but initially little to nothing was done.

In June 2013, the attorney general introduced legislation to implement the recommendations of the report. The bill proposed a mechanism for an order to dismiss strategic lawsuits which attack free expression on matters of public interest, with full costs (but not punitive damages) and on a relatively short timeframe, if the underlying claims had no reasonable prospect of success.

The bill enjoyed support from a wide range of groups including municipalities, the Canadian Environmental Law Association, EcoJustice, Environmental Defence, Ontario Clean Air Alliance, Ontario Nature, Canadian Civil Liberties Association, Canadian Journalists for Free Expression, Citizens Environment Alliance of Southwestern Ontario, The Council of Canadians, CPAWS Wildlands League, Sierra Club Ontario, Registered Nurses' Association of Ontario and Greenpeace Canada.

The legislation was re-introduced following the 2014 Ontario election as Bill 52, and on 3 November 2015, Ontario enacted it as the Protection of Public Participation Act, 2015.

==== Quebec ====
Québec's then Justice Minister, Jacques Dupuis, proposed an anti-SLAPP bill on 13 June 2008. The bill was adopted by the National Assembly of Quebec on 3 June 2009. Quebec's amended Code of Civil Procedure was the first anti-SLAPP mechanism in force in Canada.

Prior to Ontario enacting its own Anti-SLAPP law the bill was invoked there (and then Supreme Court of Canada docket 33819). In the case of Les Éditions Écosociété Inc., Alain Deneault, Delphine Abadie and William Sacher vs. Banro Inc., in which the publisher Écosociété pleaded (supported by the BCCLA) that it should not face Ontario liability for a publication in Quebec, as the suit was a SLAPP and the Quebec law explicitly provided to dismiss these. The court denied the request, ruling it had jurisdiction. A separate 2011 decision in Quebec Superior Court had ruled that Barrick Mining had to pay $143,000 to the book's three authors and publisher, Les Éditions Écosociété Inc., to prepare their defence in a "seemingly abusive" strategic lawsuit against public participation. Despite the Québec ruling, the book Noir Canada that documented the relationship between Canadian mining corporations, armed conflict and political actors in Africa was never published as part of a settlement which, according to the authors, was only made for the sole purpose of resolving the three-and-a-half-year legal battle.

The Quebec law is substantially different in structure than that of California or other jurisdictions, however, as Quebec's Constitution generally subordinates itself to international law, and as such the International Covenant on Civil and Political Rights applies. That treaty only permits liability for arbitrary and unlawful speech. The ICCPR has also been cited, in the BC case Crookes v. Newton, as the standard for balancing free speech versus reputation rights. The Supreme Court of Canada in October 2011, ruling in that case, neither reiterated nor rescinded that standard.

=== European Union ===
On 11 April 2024, the European Parliament approved an anti-SLAPP directive. The directive, which is legally binding tool for Member States, comes in addition to the non binding Recommendation (EU) 2022/758 to member states issued by the European Commission on 27 April 2022. The directive's approval came after long series of drafts, discussions and consultations between the European Commission, European Parliament and the EU member states, initiated by the European Parliament's resolution of 25 November 2020 expressing "its continued deep concern about the state of media freedom within the EU in the context of the abuses and attacks still being perpetrated against journalists and media workers in some Member States because of their work" and called on the European Commission to "establish minimum standards against SLAPP practices across the EU". The directive, due to the limited competences of the European Union, has a limited material scope of application as it only covers civil and commercial matters with a cross-border implications.

=== Council of Europe ===
In April 2024, the Council of Europe has adopted the Recommendation CM/Rec(2024)2, which contains a set of non-binding recommendations to Member States. More particularly, it covers criminal and administrative matters, contains a set of indicators to help identifying a SLAPP as such and identifies as a specific types of SLAPPs those ones targeting anonymous public participation calling for an appropriate protection of the anonymous public participants.

=== United Kingdom ===
The most common SLAPP suit used to be a civil action for defamation, which in the English common law tradition was a tort. The common law of libel dates to the early 17th century and, unlike most English law, is reverse onus, meaning that once someone alleges a statement is libellous, the burden is on the defendant to prove that it is not.

The Economic Crime and Corporate Transparency Act 2023 contains provisions allowing courts in England and Wales to strike out cases deemed by the courts to amount to SLAPPs. This power was used for the first time in March 2026 in a case brought against tax lawyer and journalist Dan Neidle.

As in the European Union there has been increasing anti-SLAPP activism in the UK led by a coalition including English PEN, Index on Censorship, the National Union of Journalists, and Amnesty International.

In June 2026 two separate anti-SLAPP Private Member's Bills were introduced in Parliament, one in the Commons by Sir John Whittingdale and one in the Lords by the Baroness Stowell of Beeston.

=== United States ===
==== Federal law ====
In 2010, President Barack Obama signed the SPEECH Act on the closely related issue of libel tourism, offering more protections for suits filed in foreign countries.

The SPEAK FREE Act of 2015 did not receive a vote after being introduced.

==== Anti-SLAPP laws at state level ====
To protect freedom of speech, an increasing number of U.S. jurisdictions have passed or bolstered anti-SLAPP laws. These laws often function by allowing a defendant to file a motion to strike or dismiss on the grounds that the case involves protected speech on a matter of public concern. The plaintiff then bears the burden of showing a probability that they will prevail. If the plaintiffs fail to meet the burden, their claim is dismissed and the plaintiffs may be required to pay a penalty for bringing the case. The specific provisions of anti-SLAPP laws vary materially by jurisdiction.

As of July 2026, forty states, the District of Columbia, and Guam have enacted anti-SLAPP laws. States with anti-SLAPP laws are Arizona, Arkansas, California, Colorado, Connecticut, Delaware, Florida, Georgia, Hawaii, Idaho, Illinois, Indiana, Iowa, Kansas, Kentucky, Louisiana, Maine, Maryland, Massachusetts, Michigan, Missouri, Montana, Nebraska, Nevada, New Jersey, New Mexico, New York, Ohio, Oklahoma, Oregon, Pennsylvania, Rhode Island, South Dakota, Tennessee, Texas, Utah, Vermont, Virginia, and Washington. As of February 2026, fifteen of these states have adopted some version of the Uniform Public Expression Protection Act (UPEPA), a uniform act of the Uniform Law Commission.

As of July 2026, ten states lack anti-SLAPP laws: Alabama, Alaska, Mississippi, New Hampshire, North Carolina, North Dakota, South Carolina, West Virginia, Wisconsin, and Wyoming. However, certain state judicial precedents in West Virginia do extend heightened protection to speech on matters of public interest.

Importantly, state anti-SLAPP laws only apply to suits filed in courts in those states. Plaintiffs often seek jurisdictions more favorable, including federal courts in some circuits, that lack the same added protections that many defendants would have received in their state court.

For example, in 1992 California enacted Code of Civil Procedure § 425.16, a statute intended to frustrate SLAPPs by providing a quick and inexpensive defense. It provides for a special motion to strike that a defendant can file at the outset of a lawsuit to strike a complaint when it arises from conduct that falls within the rights of petition or free speech. The statute expressly applies to any writing or speech made in connection with an issue under consideration or review by a legislative, executive, or judicial proceeding, or any other official proceeding authorized by law, but there is no requirement that the writing or speech be promulgated directly to the official body. It also applies to speech in a public forum about an issue of public interest and to any other petition or speech conduct about an issue of public interest.

In February 2025, Greenpeace went on trial against Energy Transfer in North Dakota, where it had been sued by Energy Transfer itself in 2017 claiming "Greenpeace spread misinformation that incited the protests and severely damaged its ability to run its business." Greenpeace considers this lawsuit a SLAPP; importantly ND does not have a law to dismiss lawsuits shown to be SLAPP cases.

In May 2025, the Republican governor of Iowa adopted an anti-SLAPP law. It forced Donald Trump to drop his federal lawsuit against the Des Moines Register, which was widely considered a SLAPP lawsuit, so he refiled it at the state level.

In 2025, author Toni Marek became involved in litigation with Phi Theta Kappa after the organization sought a temporary restraining order preventing distribution of her manuscript. The dispute resulted in the case Marek v. Phi Theta Kappa, in which a Texas district court initially granted the restraining order on an ex parte basis but later dissolved it and denied a request for a temporary injunction following a hearing.

Anti-SLAPP laws are generally considered to have a favorable effect, and many lawyers have fought to enact stronger laws protecting against SLAPPs.

== Notable SLAPPs ==
=== Australia ===
- "Gunns 20": In the 2005 Gunns Limited v Marr & Ors case, Gunns filed a writ in the Supreme Court of Victoria against 20 individuals and organisations, including Senator Bob Brown, for over A$7.8 million. The defendants have become collectively known as the "Gunns 20". Gunns claimed that the defendants sullied its reputation and caused it to lose jobs and profits. The defendants claimed that they are protecting the environment. Opponents and critics of the case have suggested that the writ was filed with the intent to discourage public criticism of the company. Gunns has maintained the position that they were merely trying to prevent parties enjoined to the writ from undertaking unlawful activities that disrupt their business. The statement of claim alleged incidents of assault against forestry workers and vandalism. At a hearing before the Supreme Court of Victoria, an amended statement of claim lodged by the company and served on defendants on 1 July 2005, was dismissed. However, the judge in the case granted the company leave to lodge a third version of their statement of claim with the court no later than 15 August 2005. The application continued before the court, before being brought to a close on 20 October 2006. In his ruling, Justice Bernard Bongiorno made award of costs in favour of the respondents only on the party-party basis, despite an costs application for indemnity costs incurred with striking out the third version of the statement of claim. In 2006, Gunns dropped the case against Helen Gee, Peter Pullinger and Doctors for Forests. In December 2006, it abandoned the claim against Greens MPs Bob Brown and Peg Putt. The other matters were all settled following the payment of more than $150,000 in damages or, in some cases, undertakings to the court not to protest at certain locations, with Gunns agreeing to pay the costs.

=== Brazil ===
- ThyssenKrupp Atlantic Steel Company (TKCSA), one of the largest private enterprises in Latin America, sued Brazilian researchers from public universities as UERJ (Rio de Janeiro State University) and Fiocruz (Oswaldo Cruz Foundation) for moral damages. First, TKCSA sued research pulmonologist Hermano Albuquerque de Castro from Sergio Arouca National School of Public Health (ENSP – Fiocruz). Then TKCSA sued Alexandre Pessoa Dias, research professor of the Joaquim Venâncio Polytechnic School of Health (EPSJV – Fiocruz), and Monica Cristina Lima, a biologist from Pedro Ernesto University Hospital and board member of the Public University Workers Union of Rio de Janeiro State (Sintuperj). The last two lawsuits occurred after the disclosure of the technical report "Evaluation of social, environmental and health impacts caused by the setup and operation of TKCSA in Santa Cruz".

=== Canada ===
- Daishowa Inc. v. Friends of the Lubicon: From 1995 to 1998 a series of judgements (OJ 1536 1995, OJ 1429 1998 (ONGD)) established that defendants, who had accused a global company of engaging in "genocide", were entitled to recover court costs due to the public interest in the criticism, even if it was rhetorically unjustifiable. This was the first case to establish clearly the SLAPP criteria.
- Fraser v. Saanich (District) 1995, [BCJ 3100 BCSC] was held explicitly to be a SLAPP, the first known case to be so described. Justice Singh found plaintiff's conduct to be "reprehensible and deserving of censure", ordering he pay "special costs" (page 48, Strategic Lawsuits Against Public Participation: The British Columbia Experience, RECEIL 19(1) 2010 ISSN 0962-8797) to compensate.
- Canadian Prime Minister Stephen Harper filed a suit against the Liberal Party of Canada, the Official Opposition, after the latter paid for trucks to drive through the streets playing a journalist's tape of Harper admitting he knew of "financial considerations" offered to dying MP Chuck Cadman before a critical House of Commons of Canada vote in 2005. This, the Liberals and most commentators and authorities agreed, would be a serious crime if proven. Harper alleged the tape had been altered but a court found no evidence of this. The suit was dropped by Michael Ignatieff after he replaced Stephane Dion as Leader of the Opposition, and so was not heard in court, but was transparently a (successful) effort to get the trucks off the streets.
- Crookes v. Openpolitics.ca, filed May 2006 [S063287, Supreme Court of BC], and a series of related suits leading to a unanimous October 2011 ruling by the Supreme Court of Canada in Crookes v. Newton, upheld the rights of online debaters to link freely to third parties without fear of liability for contents at the other end of the link. A number of related rulings had previously established that transient comments on the Internet could not be, in themselves, simply printed and used to prove that "publication" had occurred for purposes of libel and defamation law in Canada. Other elements of the ruling clarified how responsible journalism (and therefore the right to protect anonymous sources), qualified privilege and innocent dissemination defenses applied to persons accused of online defamation.
- In May 2010, Youthdale Treatment Centres of Toronto, Ontario filed a defamation suit against various former patients, parents of former patients, and other persons, claiming C$5 million in damages. The lawsuit, filed on 5 May 2010, on behalf of Youthdale by Harvin Pitch and Jennifer Lake of Teplitsky, Colson LLP, claimed that these persons were involved in a conspiracy to, among other things, have Youthdale's licence to operate revoked. Youthdale also claimed their reputation was damaged as a result of various actions by the named defendants, which Youthdale alleged included the creation of websites and blogs containing complaints against Youthdale, including alleged accusations of unlawful administration of psychotropic medications. A notable left-turn for Youthdale occurred in July 2010, when Youthdale became the subject of a Toronto Star investigation, in which it was found that Youthdale had been admitting children to its Secure Treatment Unit that did not have mental disorders. The case has since been dismissed.
- In 2011, in Robin Scory v. Glen Valley Watersheds Society, a BC court ruled that "an order for special costs acts as a deterrent to litigants whose purpose is to interfere with the democratic process", and that "Public participation and dissent is an important part of our democratic system." However, such awards remained rare.
- In 2012, Sino-Forest sued Muddy Waters Research for $4 billion for defamation in the Ontario Superior Court of Justice. Muddy Waters had accused Sino-Forest of fraudulently inflating its assets and earnings, and had claimed the company's shares were essentially worthless. However, on 10 January 2012, Sino-Forest announced that its historic financial statements and related audit reports should not be relied upon. Sino-forest also filed for bankruptcy protection. In response to the lawsuit, Muddy Waters stated that Sino's bankruptcy protection filing vindicated its accusations since the company would not require bankruptcy protection if it was really generating close to $2 billion in cash flow. Sino-Forest was represented by Bennett Jones LLP.
- In September 2014, Brampton, Ontario mayor Susan Fennell used threats of legal action against fellow councillors, the Toronto Star, the city's integrity commissioner, and auditor Deloitte to delay a city council meeting which was to discuss a major spending scandal. As the parties involved needed an opportunity to seek legal advice, regardless of the merit (or spuriousness) of the claims, this tactic served to defer a key debate which otherwise would have, and should have, taken place before the city's 27 October municipal election.

=== France ===
- In 2010 and 2011, a French blogger was summoned twice by the communication company Cometik (NOVA-SEO) over exposing their quick-selling method (also known as one shot method) and suggesting a financial compensation for his first trial. The company's case was dismissed twice, but appealed both times. On 31 March 2011, the company won:
  - the censorship of any reference (of its name) on Mathias Poujol-Rost's weblog,
  - €2,000 as damages,
  - the obligation to publish the judicial decision for 3 months,
  - €2,000 as procedural allowance,
  - all legal fees for both first and appeal instances.

=== Germany ===
In September 2017, a naturopath in Arizona named Colleen Huber filed a defamation lawsuit, preceded by two cease and desist letters, against Britt Marie Hermes, a naturopathy whistleblower. The lawsuit was filed for Hermes' blog post criticizing Huber for using naturopathic remedies to treat cancer and speculating that Hermes' name was being used without her permission in several registered domain names owned by Huber. The lawsuit was filed in Kiel, Germany where Hermes was residing to pursue her PhD in evolutionary genomics. Jann Bellamy of Science-Based Medicine speculates that this is "due to good old forum shopping for a more plaintiff-friendly jurisdiction" as there were no protections against SLAPP lawsuits in Germany at that time. Britt Hermes is a notable scientific skeptic and the organization Australian Skeptics set up a fund to help with legal costs on the case. In an interview at CSICon 2019, Britt Hermes told Susan Gerbic that she had won her case on 24 May 2019. According to Britt Hermes, "the court ruled that my post is protected speech under Article 5 (1) of the German constitution".

=== Greece ===
In 2022, in the wake of revelations that Greece's National Intelligence Service (Greece) was spying on the leader of PASOK, the third largest party, Nikos Androulakis, the executive director of NIS, Grigoris Kontoleon, and the Secretary General to prime minister Kyriakos Mitsotakis, Grigoris Dimitriadis (also a close relative of Kyriakos Mitsotakis) resigned from office. Grigoris Dimitriadis filed lawsuits against two journalists who had helped uncover the scandal, Thodoris Chondrogiannos and Nikolas Leontopoulos, demanding 150,000 euros as damages for false publications and the removal of those publications, but also against Thanassis Koukakis, a journalist who during 2021 was spied upon because of his investigations on Greek businessmen.

=== India ===
In 2020, Karan Bajaj, the founder of WhiteHat Jr., now owned by Byju's, filed a 2.6 million dollar lawsuit against Pradeep Poonia, a software engineer who publicly accused the company of having a toxic work environment and unethical business practices. The Delhi High Court issued an interim order requiring Poonia to remove certain tweets from his Twitter account. In 2021, Bajaj rescinded the lawsuit.

=== Israel ===
During 2016, Amir Bramly, who at the time was being investigated and subsequently indicted for an alleged Ponzi scheme, sued for libel Tomer Ganon, a Calcalist reporter, privately for ₪1 million in damages, due to a news item linking him to Bar Refaeli. In addition Bramly sued Channel-2 News and its reporters and managers for ₪5 million in damages due to an alleged libel in an in-depth TV news item and interview with the court appointed liquidator of his companies, and has threatened to sue additional bodies. The sued individuals and bodies have claimed that these are SLAPP actions.

=== Japan ===
In 2006, Oricon Inc., Japan's music chart provider, sued freelance journalist Hiro Ugaya due to his suggesting in an article for business and culture magazine Cyzo that the company was fiddling its statistics to benefit certain management companies and labels, specifically Johnny and Associates. The company sought ¥50 million and apology from him. He found allies in the magazine's editor-in-chief Tadashi Ibi, lawyer Kentaro Shirosaki, and Reporters Sans Frontières (RSF).

He was found guilty in 2008 by the Tokyo District Court and ordered to pay one million yen, but he appealed and won. Oricon did not appeal later. His 33-month struggle against Oricon and his research on SLAPPs through his self-expense trip in the United States was featured on the TBS program JNN Reportage, titled as "Legal Intimidation Against Free Speech: What is SLAPP?"

RSF expressed its support to the journalist and was relieved on the abandonment of the suit.

=== Mexico ===
The Committee to Protect Journalists noted that vexatious litigation by politicians against journalists increased following a 2016 resolution in Mexico City, drawing comparisons to SLAPP suits. Between 2020 and 2025, 158 journalists faced libel lawsuits.

=== Norway ===
On 17 May 2018, a non-profit project rettspraksis.no challenged a perceived monopoly on the publication of pre-2009 Supreme Court of Norway decisions by publishing a large back catalogue of historical decisions. To prevent publication, the government-established Lovdata foundation demanded an immediate injunction against two project volunteers, Håkon Wium Lie and Fredrik Ljone, that the website be shut down. The foundation claimed that rettspraksis.no had "developed or used software to systematically download rulings from Lovdatas online services" in order to publish the rulings in violation of Lovdata's rights according to the Norwegian Copyright Act section 43, the Database Rights Section. The District Court granted the injunction without a hearing based on finding that the volunteer actions was in violation of section 43, and that the publication on rettspraksis.no would enable other commercial actors to exploit the material in violation of Lovdata's rights even if the project itself did not. A postjudgement hearing on 30 and 31 August 2018 resulted in a reduction in the injunction's effects, most significantly that the Database Rights Section did not extend to rulings published before 2005. Appeals from Ljone and Wium Lie to the Appeals Court and the Supreme Court were denied.

=== Serbia ===
In the late 1990s, many SLAPP cases against independent and pro-opposition media ensued after adoption of the infamous media law, proposed by then minister of information, Aleksandar Vučić. The main characteristic of these cases were quick trials and extremely high fines, most of which were unaffordable for journalists and their media houses. While SLAPP cases became, more or less, rare after the Overthrow of Slobodan Milošević, they gradually reappeared in the late 2010s, and especially in the early 2020s, during SNS-led cabinets. Notably, Aleksandar Vučić is current president of Serbia, the most influential figure of the regime, and he is often accused of suppression of media freedoms.

=== Sweden ===
In 2020, the Swedish businessman Svante Kumlin domiciled in Monaco sued the on-line magazine Realtid, its editor-in-chief, Camilla Jonsson, and the reporters, Per Agerman and Annelie Östlund of defamation for publishing false information, and breaching a non-disclosure agreement in the United Kingdom. The legal action was strongly condemned by press freedom organizations. Most of the businessman's libel claims were thrown out. The case was eventually settled by the journal publishing an apology for three of its articles, which Reporters Without Borders (RSF) fears negatively impacts media freedom and urged the Swedish authorities to take new measures against SLAPP. In the same year, the European Parliament adopted Directive (EU) 2024/1069 on protecting persons who engage in public participation from unfounded or abusive legal proceedings (“strategic lawsuits against public participation”). Following this, the Swedish Department of Justice began consultations on how the directive should be implemented in Swedish law.

=== Thailand ===
On 6 March 2024, Chutima Sidasathian won a SLAPP suit against Thanonthorn Kaveekitrattana, after facing defamation charges for a 2022 post exposing misappropriation of funds from the Village Fund program.

=== United Kingdom ===
A 2021 libel action brought against the publisher HarperCollins and the author and journalist Catherine Belton over the latter's book Putin's People was described by former Conservative cabinet minister David Davis as a SLAPP. Despite winning the legal case brought by several Russian oligarchs, including Roman Abramovich, Belton was left facing legal costs of £1.5 million. UK Government justice minister James Cartlidge said, "the Ministry of Justice is monitoring SLAPP threats against journalists and announced that the UK will be a member of the Council of Europe's inaugural working group on SLAPPs with an anti-SLAPP draft recommendation for member states due in December 2023. I will be giving SLAPPs in UK courts urgent consideration. I want to make it clear that the Government are committed to a robust defence of transparency and freedom of speech. We will not tolerate anything that risks tarnishing the integrity of our judicial and legal profession".

In 2021, Yevgeni Prigozhin, the Russian warlord and oligarch, had his UK-based lawyers file a SLAPP lawsuit against Elliot Higgins, the founder of Bellingcat, for identifying Prigozhin as the commander of the Wagner Group.

Ministers later said that they would reform the legal system to prevent "intimidation lawsuits"; amendments to this effect were proposed for an anti-corruption economic crime bill before Parliament in March 2022. In October 2023, royal assent was given to the Economic Crime and Corporate Transparency Act 2023. The final Act includes anti-SLAPP provisions covering economic crimes (e.g. corruption, embezzlement), but does not venture beyond those areas.

In February 2024, the Conservative government under Rishi Sunak supported legislation to extend anti-SLAPP protections in all cases whatsoever, but this was not passed before the 4 July 2024 election ended Sunak's government.

=== United States ===
- From 1981 to 1986, Pacific Legal Foundation (PLF) and San Luis Obispo County, California, filed a suit attempting to obtain the mailing list of the Abalone Alliance to get the group to pay for the police costs of the largest anti-nuclear civil-disobedience act in U.S. history at the Diablo Canyon Power Plant. The September 1981 demonstration involved tens of thousands of people. The County was dismissed from the case by the trial judge, and lost on appeal for recovery of police costs (including in part because such costs are intended to be covered by taxes). In 1985, the Supreme Court of California declined to block a lower court ruling that allowed PLF to sue "leaders of the demonstration [for] costs associated with the protest", which defendants said was an attempt to chill dissent. Pacific Legal Foundation lost at every court level and withdrew the suit the day before it was due to be heard by the U.S. Supreme Court.
- Karen Winner, the author of Divorced From Justice, is recognized as "[the] catalyst for the changes that we adopted", said Leo Milonas, a retired justice with the Appellate Division of the New York state courts who chaired a special commission that recommended the changes adopted by Chief Judge Judith Kaye. (The NY state court report's committee cited a previous New York City Commissioner of Consumer Protection report as a "major" reason for its study. Karen Winner was the author of the earlier study.) But in 1999, Winner, along with a psychologist/whistleblower, and several citizens were SLAPPed for criticizing the guardian ad litem system and a former judge in South Carolina. Winner's report, "Findings on Judicial Practices & Court-appointed Personnel in the Family Courts in Dorchester, Charleston & Berkeley Counties, South Carolina" and citizen demonstrations led to the first laws in South Carolina to establish minimum standards and licensing requirements for guardians ad litem, who represent the interests of children in court cases. The retaliatory SLAPPs have been dragging on for nearly 10 years, with judgments totaling more than $11 million against the co-defendants collectively. Reflecting the retaliatory nature of these suits, at least one of the co-defendants is still waiting to find out from the judges which particular statements, if any, he made were false.
- Before the rise of Internet litigation, anti-SLAPP protections were typically associated with traditional media. The first known motion to extend those protections to online communications was filed on July 27, 1999, in Business Wire v. Jeffrey S. Mitchell et al.
- Barbra Streisand, as plaintiff, lost a 2003 SLAPP motion after she sued an aerial photographer involved in the California Coastal Records Project. Streisand v. Adelman, (California Superior Court Case SC077257) See Streisand effect.
- In 2004, RadioShack Corporation sued Bradley D. Jones, the webmaster of RadioShackSucks.com and a former RadioShack dealer for 17 years, in an attempt to suppress online discussion of a class action lawsuit in which more than 3,300 current or former RadioShack managers were alleging the company required them to work long hours without overtime pay.
- Nationally syndicated talk radio host Tom Martino prevailed in an anti-SLAPP motion in 2009 after he was sued for libel by a watercraft retailer. The case received national attention for its suggestion that no one reasonably expects objective facts from a typical talk show host, who is often a comedian telling jokes.
- In March 2009, MagicJack (a company that promotes a USB VoIP device) filed a defamation suit against Boing Boing for exposing their unfair and deceptive business tactics regarding their EULA, visitor counter, and 30-day trial period. This was dismissed as a SLAPP by a California judge in late 2009. In the resulting ruling, MagicJack was made responsible for most of Boing Boing's legal costs.
- In the 2009 case Comins vs. VanVoorhis, a Florida man named Christopher Comins filed a defamation suit against a University of Florida graduate student after the student blogged about a video of Comins repeatedly shooting someone's pet dogs. This was cited as an example of a SLAPP by the radio show On the Media.
- In November 2010, filmmaker Fredrik Gertten, as defendant, won an anti-SLAPP motion after he was sued for defamation by Dole Fruit Company. The case concerned Gertten's documentary film about farm workers. The lengthy lawsuit was documented in Gertten's film Big Boys Gone Bananas!*.
- "Scientology versus the Internet" refers to a number of disputes relating to the Church of Scientology's efforts to suppress material critical of Scientology on the Internet through the use of lawsuits and legal threats.
- Saltsman v. Goddard (the Steubenville High School rape case): In an effort to stop blogger Alexandria Goddard's website from allowing allegedly defamatory posts about their son, two parents of a teenaged boy from Steubenville, Ohio sued Goddard and a dozen anonymous posters in October 2012. The lawsuit asked for an injunction against the blogger, a public apology, acknowledgement that he was not involved in the rape, and $25,000 in damages.

External videos
- SLAPP Suits: Last Week Tonight with John Oliver (HBO) on YouTube

- On 27 August 2012, Robert E. Murray and Murray Energy filed a lawsuit against environment reporter Ken Ward Jr. and the Charleston Gazette-Mail of Charleston, West Virginia. The lawsuit alleged Ken Ward Jr. posted libelous statements on his blog. Murray claims the blog post entitled "Mitt Romney, Murray Energy and Coal Criminals" has damaged his business, reputation, and has jeopardized the jobs Murray Energy provides in Belmont County, Ohio. In June 2017, Murray Energy issued a cease and desist letter to the HBO television show Last Week Tonight with John Oliver following the show's attempt to obtain comment about the coal industry. The show went ahead with the episode (18 June), in which host John Oliver discussed the Crandall Canyon Mine collapse in Utah in 2007, and expressed the opinion that Murray did not do enough to protect his miners' safety. Three days later, Murray and his companies brought suit against Oliver, the show's writers, HBO, and Time Warner. The lawsuit alleged that, in the Last Week Tonight show, Oliver "incited viewers to do harm to Mr. Murray and his companies". The ACLU filed an amicus brief in support of HBO in the case; the brief has been described as "hilarious" and the "snarkiest legal brief ever". The brief also included a comparison of Murray with the fictional character Dr. Evil that was used in the Oliver show, with the explanation that "it should be remembered that truth is an absolute defense to a claim of defamation". On 11 August 2017, a federal district court judge ruled that Murray Energy suits against The New York Times and HBO could each proceed in a lower state court. The suit against HBO was dismissed with prejudice on 21 February 2018. In November 2019, John Oliver discussed the implications of the lawsuit (and of SLAPP suits in general) on his show after Murray dropped the suit.
- In August 2015, the State Fair of Texas was sanctioned more than $75,000 for filing a SLAPP suit against a lawyer who had requested financial documents from the State Fair.
- In March 2019, Republican US Representative for California, Devin Nunes filed a defamation lawsuit against Twitter, Elizabeth "Liz" Mair, Mair Strategies LLC, and the people behind the parody Twitter accounts "Devin Nunes' Cow" (@DevinCow) and "Devin Nunes' Mom" (@DevinNunesMom), seeking $250 million in damages. The lawsuit has been described by legal experts as a SLAPP. The suit was filed in Virginia, a state known to have weak anti-SLAPP laws, rather than in California, where Nunes lives and where Twitter is headquartered, which has strong anti-SLAPP laws. In April 2019, Nunes filed, again in Virginia, a defamation suit against The Fresno Bee, his hometown newspaper, and its owner, McClatchy, after it published a story about investors in his winery partying on a yacht with cocaine and prostitutes. Nunes has since filed defamation lawsuits against CNN, Ryan Lizza, Hearst Magazines, Campaign for Accountability, Fusion GPS, and others. In February 2020 (following the 2019 elections in which Democrats took control of both chambers for the first time since 1994), the Virginia General Assembly passed bills intended to discourage future SLAPPs in the state by strengthening defendant protections.
- In November 2020, BYD Company filed a libel lawsuit against Vice Media and the non-profit Alliance for American Manufacturing (AAM) and some of its employees. The Supreme Court of the United States rejected BYD's suit in August 2022.

== See also ==
- Barratry (common law), Frivolous litigation, Spamigation, Vexatious litigation/Paper terrorism
- Cease and desist
- Chilling effect
- DARVO ("deny, attack, and reverse victim and offender")
- Lawfare
- Legal threat
- Media transparency
- Reputation management

=== Case studies (U.S.) ===
- Horizon Group v. Bonnen, No. 2009 L 008675 (Ill. Cir. Ct. July 20, 2009)
- McDonald's Restaurants v Morris & Steel [1997] EWHC 366 (QB)
- Santa Barbara News-Press controversy
- Scientology and the legal system
- Steven Donziger
- Varian v. Delfino, 35 Cal.4th 180 (2005)
