= Trademark troll =

Intellectual property abuser

In international law and business, a trademark troll is a person or company that attempts to register a trademark illegitimately and then threatens to sue others who use that mark. As a traditional troll is said to collect a toll from those trying to cross a bridge, a trademark troll "magically appears when an unsuspecting producer adopts the same or similar mark and poses upon them two choices: pay to get a license to use my mark or litigate".

The existence of trademark trolls exemplifies a common misunderstanding about trademark rights: the mere registration of a mark does not give the trademark owner a monopoly over that mark but must be used in commerce. As a consequence, while Leo Stoller, labelled a "prototypical trademark troll" by intellectual property attorney Anna Folgers, had brought 47 trademark infringement suits as of 2007, no court had found any infringement and the Northern District of Illinois had enjoined him from filing new actions without the court's permission. Similarly, the business practices of Tim Langdell of Edge Games were referred to as trolling by the US District Court after it was found that there was no evidence of commercial use of the asserted marks but that there was instead evidence that Langdell had fraudulently obtained and/or maintained many of his registrations.

Another more targeted example in 2008 involved Never Give Up Limited claiming that they owned the brands of two fruit juice chains, Juiceling in Glasgow and Juiced Up in Edinburgh. According to undercover reporting by the BBC, Never Give Up's representative, John Blanchard, sought tens of thousands of pounds to sell the trademarks back.

A more successful example was in November 2007, when businessman Dave Behar and his internet content production company Positive Ions, Inc. sued Ion Media Networks, claiming that Positive Ions owned the trademark to the word "Ion" and that Ion Media was using the name "Ion" without permission. Positive Ions were awarded a $1.7 million settlement; however, Ion Media continued using the "Ion" name for its channels.

In 2017, PBS member station WNED, which produced the Reading Rainbow series, filed a trademark infringement lawsuit against the show's former host, LeVar Burton. WNED took issue with the name of Burton's company RRKidz, and sought administrative control of its websites and social media accounts. WNED also petitioned to stop Burton from using the Reading Rainbow catchphrase, "But you don't have to take my word for it," on his podcast. After winning the lawsuit, WNED announced a revamp of the show, which ended up in development hell.

In China, trademark trolling, also translated as trademark "squatting", has been described by commentators and policymakers as a serious problem. Under 2019 regulations governing trademark applications, China prohibits any filing of trademarks in bad faith, and explicitly names trademark trolling as a form of unlawful bad faith. Violators can be fined up to 100,000 yuan, while managers working for violators may be held personally liable for a fine of 50,000 yuan and face possible jail time in serious cases.

== See also ==
- Copyright troll
- Patent troll
- SAD Scheme
