= Vexatious litigation =

Legal action which is brought solely to harass or subdue an adversary

Vexatious litigation is legal action which is brought solely to harass or subdue an adversary. It may take the form of a primary frivolous lawsuit or may be the repetitive, burdensome, and unwarranted filing of meritless motions in a matter which is otherwise a meritorious cause of action. Filing vexatious litigation is considered an abuse of the judicial process and may result in sanctions against the offender.

A single action, even a frivolous one, is usually not enough to raise a litigant to the level of being declared vexatious. Rather, a pattern of frivolous legal actions is typically required to rise to the level of vexatious. Repeated and severe instances by a single lawyer or firm can result in eventual disbarment.

Some jurisdictions have a list of vexatious litigants: people who have repeatedly abused the legal system. Because lawyers could be disbarred for participating in this abuse of the legal process, vexatious litigants are often unable to retain legal counsel, and such litigants, therefore, represent themselves in court. Those on the vexatious litigant list are usually either forbidden to take any further legal action or are required to obtain prior permission from a senior judge before taking any legal action. The process by which a person is added to the list varies among jurisdictions. In liberal democratic jurisdictions, declaring someone a vexatious litigant is considered to be a serious measure and rarely occurs, as judges and officials are reluctant to curtail a person's access to the courts.

These legal actions occur in some countries of the former British Empire, where the common law system still remains: Australia, Canada, Ireland, New Zealand, UK, and US, which are specified below. Civil (codified/continental) law systems typically do not have a prohibition against vexatious litigation.

== History of legislation against vexatious litigation ==
The concept of vexatious litigation entered into law in 1896 with the Vexatious Actions Act, enacted in England and soon extended to Scotland and Ireland. This was primarily a response to the actions of Alexander Chaffers, a solicitor who filed numerous actions against leading members of Victorian society. When costs were awarded against him, he failed to pay.

The first such law outside the British Isles, the Supreme Court Act, 1927 was passed in Australia nearly thirty years later. This too was prompted by the behaviour of an individual, Rupert Millane. The first vexatious litigant law in the United States was enacted in California in 1963. By 2007 four more US states had passed similar legislation: Florida, Hawaii, Ohio, and Texas.

== Laws by country ==
=== Australia ===
==== Queensland ====
In Queensland, the process for having someone declared a vexatious litigant is governed by the Vexatious Proceedings Act 2005, which supplanted an earlier Act. The Act defines a vexatious proceeding to include a proceeding brought without merit or any prospect of success, with the consequence that it is not necessary to prove the existence of any improper motive in order to obtain relief under the Act. As of June 2019 there were 26 people found to be vexatious litigants.

==== South Australia ====
In South Australia, vexatious litigation laws were enacted in the mid-1930s with the Supreme Court Act 1935-1936, following similar laws enacted in Victoria. In 2010 the Rann government acted to strengthen the ability of the courts to act against vexatious litigants by "increasing the range of courts and tribunals that can declare people as vexatious". Prior to that date, few people had been banned from bringing litigation to South Australian courts – by 2005, only two people were listed as having been declared as vexatious litigants, the first in 1997 and the second declared during that year. As of June 2019 there were 7 people found to be vexatious litigants.

==== Statistics ====
As of June 2019, 21 people in Victoria had been declared vexatious litigants since the law was introduced in 1930.

The High Court of Australia declared only four people to be vexatious litigants in its 116 years in existence as of June 2019, whereas the Australian Federal Court system, established in 1976, has at least 49 names on its barred registry.

In New South Wales, as of June 2019 there were 43 people on the New South Wales Supreme Court's vexatious litigants register.

As of June 2019 there were 22 people found to be vexatious litigants in Western Australia.

=== Canada ===
Under the Constitution Act, 1867, section 92(14), each province is vested with the power to enact and apply laws relating to the administration of justice within its own territory.

In Canada, Section 40 of the Federal Court Act and in Ontario Section 140 of the Courts of Justice Act, restrict the ability to introduce or continue proceedings for those who have instituted vexatious proceedings or conducted proceedings in a vexatious manner.

==== Quebec ====
In Quebec, the Code of Civil Procedure is the principal legislation that sets rules related to civil procedure. Under section 46 of the Code of Civil Procedure, all judicial courts and judges in Quebec are vested with "all the powers necessary for the exercise of their jurisdiction". Furthermore, they may:

at any time and in all matters, whether in first instance or in appeal, issue orders to safeguard the rights of the parties, for such time and on such conditions as they may determine. As well, they may, in the matters brought before them, even on their own initiative, issue injunctions or reprimands, suppress writings or declare them libellous, and make such orders as are appropriate to deal with cases for which no specific remedy is provided by law.

Section 46 vests a very broad power on judicial courts and judges to ensure that the administration of justice is conducted according to decorum and according to the remedial nature of justice. As the courts's decisions have shown it, the authority to declare a litigant as vexatious is directly tributary to the power conferred by section 46. Cases illustrating the application of section 46 are numerous. Among them, there are: Nguiagain v. Commission de la fonction publique, in which the judge rejected the plaintiff's motion for a mandamus to enjoin his union to revise the grievance that he had filed on the grounds that the motion was groundless and abusive; De Niverville c. Descôteaux, where an injunction was rendered declaring the respondent, disbarred lawyer Descôteaux, as a vexatious litigant due to the multiple unfounded and frivolous actions that he had sought against the plaintiff De Niverville; and in Fabrikant v. Corbin, a motion to declare the plaintiff Valery Fabrikant as a vexatious litigant was granted to the defendant, Corbin. In all of the above cited cases, a litigant was only declared vexatious following a proceeding instated by the opposite party. Moreover, section 46's scope is limited to judicial courts and judges. Administrative tribunals are legislative creations and they can only exist and function within the limits that are imposed by law. Administrative tribunals in Quebec cannot declare a person a vexatious litigant.

As per section 90 of the Rules of Practice of the Superior Court of Québec in Civil Matters, such litigants are now indexed in a registry kept by the Chief Justice in the judiciary district of Montreal. Lawyer and author Claude Duchesnay has reported in May 2003 that a document on the Quebec attorney general's intranet contains the name of 58 persons who must obtain permission prior to instating proceedings before the courts.

=== India ===
There is not a specific law titled "Vexatious Litigation Law" in India, the concept is primarily addressed through provisions in the Civil Procedure Code and through judicial decisions. The Indian legal system empowers courts to deal with vexatious litigation through several mechanisms. One common tool is the imposition of costs on the litigant who files frivolous suits. Courts have the discretion to order costs to be paid to the opposing party as a means of discouraging such behavior. These costs can include legal fees and compensation for the wasted time and resources of the other party. Also under Section 35A of the Civil Procedure Code, courts have the authority to declare a litigant a "vexatious litigant." This declaration prohibits the person from filing any further lawsuits in a particular court without obtaining prior permission. This provision is designed to deter individuals from repeatedly abusing the legal system. Courts have the authority to dismiss frivolous cases at the preliminary stage and even initiate contempt of court proceedings against those who persistently file baseless lawsuits.

=== Ireland ===
In Ireland, a court may, of its own motion or on application, order that no proceedings, either of a certain type or at all, may be issued by a certain person without leave of that court or some other court, for a specified time, or indefinitely. Such an order is referred to in legal circles as an Isaac Wunder order after Isaac Wunder who made several claims against the Hospitals Trust claiming sweepstakes prizes, but the claims were found to be groundless and the case deemed frivolous or vexatious. He was prohibited from taking further High Court proceedings in the action without leave of the court.

=== New Zealand ===
In New Zealand a person may be declared a vexatious litigant by a High Court Judge on the application of the Attorney-General. A vexatious litigant must then apply to a High Court Judge for leave to commence any action. A decision by the High Court whether or not to grant leave cannot be appealed.

=== United Kingdom ===
==== England and Wales ====
In England and Wales there are two methods to control vexatious litigants:

- Civil restraint orders (made by the courts themselves on the application or their own initiative); and
- Vexatious litigants orders (made by the High Court under section 42 of the Senior Courts Act 1981 on the application of HM Attorney-General).

His Majesty's Courts and Tribunals Service maintains a list of vexatious litigants and those subject to a civil restraint order.

===== Civil restraint orders =====
Courts in England and Wales have the means of escalating the sanctions against a litigant who makes applications to the court that are "totally without merit". Civil restraint orders allow courts to forbid applications for court hearings without the permission of a judge. There are three types of CRO: limited, extended and general, with different scopes of application. Further applications totally without merit can lead to the withdrawal of the right of appeal. Harassment of the court and court officials can lead to a penal prohibition notice, prohibiting the litigant from contacting or approaching the court without permission.

===== Vexatious litigant orders =====
Section 42 of the Senior Courts Act 1981 provides the High Court with the power to make an order restricting the ability of a person to undertake litigation without leave of the High Court. The High Court may make a civil proceedings order, a criminal proceedings order or an all proceedings order.

A person subject to a civil proceedings order may not institute or continue civil proceedings in any court (which includes tribunals of a judicial function) without leave of the High Court. A person subject to a criminal proceeding order may not lay information before a justice of the peace or prefer a bill of indictment without leave of the High Court. A person subject to an all proceedings order is subject to the restriction in both a civil proceedings order and a criminal proceedings order.

Where the High Court makes an order under this section it is published in The London Gazette.

Such an order can only be made on the application of HM Attorney-General and where the High Court is satisfied that the person has habitually and persistently and without any reasonable ground—

1. instituted vexatious civil proceedings, whether in the High Court or the family court or any inferior court, and whether against the same person or against different persons; or
2. made vexatious applications in any civil proceedings, whether in the High Court or the family court or any inferior court, and whether instituted by him or another, or
3. instituted vexatious prosecutions (whether against the same person or different persons).

In relation to the civil proceedings, the High Court will only grant leave to initiate or continue the proceedings or application where it is satisfied it is not an abuse of the process of the court in question and that there are reasonable grounds for the proceedings or application.

In relation to criminal proceedings, the High Court will only grant leave for the laying of an information or for an application for leave to prefer a bill of indictment where it is satisfied that the institution of the prosecution is not an abuse of the criminal process and that there are reasonable grounds for the institution of the prosecution by the applicant.

==== Scotland ====
The Scottish Courts and Tribunals Service holds a published list of members of the public who have habitually and persistently instituted vexatious legal proceedings without reasonable ground, and have been declared vexatious litigants under the Vexatious Actions (Scotland) Act 1898. This piece of legislation has been repealed, and replaced by incorporation into section 100 of the Courts Reform (Scotland) Act 2014. Under this legislation, the Inner House of the Court of Session can make an order to prevent a person accused of vexatious litigation from raising or progressing any civil legal proceedings without permission from a judge of the Outer House of the Court of Session. Such an Order may have a specified time period, or may run indefinitely. The published list of such individuals, as of December 2024, contains thirteen names.

=== United States ===
The American Rule regarding attorneys' fees, a unique practice among developed countries, is sometimes cited as a contributing factor to vexatious litigation in the United States.

As of 2007, several states have vexatious litigant laws — California, Florida, Hawaii, Ohio, and Texas.

==== California ====
The Judicial Council of California maintains an online monthly Vexatious Litigant List containing the names of several thousand vexatious individuals and companies. Orders filed from 1991 to the present are included on the list. Unless represented by an attorney, persons on the list may not file any new litigation in California without first obtaining permission from the presiding judge of the court. Under California Code of Civil Procedure § 391.7(a), any vexatious litigant who disobeys the prefiling order may be punished for contempt of court.

Under California law a vexatious litigant is someone who does any of the following, most of which require that the litigant be proceeding pro se, i.e., representing themself:

1. In the immediately preceding seven-year period has maintained in propria persona at least five litigations other than in a small claims court that have been (i) finally determined adversely to the person or (ii) unjustifiably remained pending at least two years without going to trial or hearing.
2. After a litigation has been finally determined (Note: A judgment is final when all avenues for direct review (appeals, writs, etc.) have been exhausted.) against the person, repeatedly relitigates or attempts to relitigate, in propria persona, either (i) the validity of the determination against the same defendant or defendants or (ii) the cause of action, claim, or any of the issues of fact or law, determined or concluded by the final determination against the same defendant or defendants.
3. In any litigation while acting in propria persona, repeatedly files unmeritorious motions or other papers, conducts unnecessary discovery, or engages in other tactics that are frivolous or solely intended to cause unnecessary delay.
4. Has previously been declared to be a vexatious litigant by any state or federal court in a proceeding based upon substantially similar facts.

The threshold for "repeated" frivolous motions or litigations is quite high. “Most cases affirming the vexatious litigant designation involve situations where litigants have filed dozens of motions either during the pendency of an action or relating to the same judgment." Evidence that a litigant is a frequent plaintiff or defendant alone is insufficient to support a vexatious litigant designation.

Repeated motions must be "so devoid of merit and be so frivolous that they can be described as a flagrant abuse of the system, have no reasonable probability of success, lack reasonable or probable cause or excuse, and are clearly meant to abuse the processes of the courts and to harass the adverse party than other litigants." The moving party, in addition to demonstrating that the plaintiff is vexatious, must show that the case has little chance of prevailing on the merits. If the plaintiff is so determined, a bond may be required, and if the plaintiff does not meet the bond requirement, the case is dismissed.

Habeas petitions do not count towards vexatious litigant determination. Vexatiousness in probate actions have a lower standard.

== Notable vexatious litigants ==
- Lawrence Bittaker, who together with his partner Roy Norris was convicted of torturing, raping and murdering five young girls in 1979, filed 40 separate frivolous lawsuits against the state of California, including one claiming "cruel and unusual punishment" after being served a broken cookie. In 1993, he was declared a vexatious litigant and was forbidden to file lawsuits without the permission of a lawyer or a judge.
- Alexander Chaffers, a solicitor whose actions led to the first British law against vexatious litigation, the Vexatious Actions Act, 1896. Chaffers became notorious after accusing the wife of Travers Twiss of being a prostitute, and subsequently issued 48 proceedings against leading members of Victorian society in the 1890s. Costs awarded against Chaffers were never paid. After the act was passed, he became the first person to be declared a habitually vexatious litigant and barred from future litigation without judicial permission.
- Caryl Chessman, American sentenced to death in 1948 for kidnapping and sexual assault.
- Valery Fabrikant, a former Concordia University professor serving a life sentence for the murders of four colleagues in 1992.
- Julian Knight, convicted of the Hoddle Street massacre in Melbourne, Australia. Numerous actions, primarily seeking injunctions against the prison incarcerating him, have cost the Victorian government over A$250,000 directly, plus some A$128,000 in outside legal costs.
- David James "Indian Chief" Lindsey, a Melbourne man so declared after repeatedly suing doctors, insurance firms and companies such as Carlton & United Breweries for smoking-related damages. On February 21, 2006, the Supreme Court of Appeal gave him leave to sue Philip Morris, demonstrating that a vexatious litigant is not completely blocked from launching further court action.
- Andy Martin (Anthony Martin-Tragona), a perennial candidate for US elections, who has been barred since 1983 from filing any legal action in a United States federal court without permission. He is also banned from seeking indigent status in Florida courts due to his history of filing abusive petitions, and from filing lawsuits in New York, unless represented by an attorney or with the court's prior approval.
- Jonathan Lee Riches, former prisoner who filed over 2,600 lawsuits over the course of six years.
- The Church of Scientology; after Scientology sued former member Robin Scott, the court wrote in 1996: "Plaintiffs (Scientologists) have abused the federal court system by using it, inter alia, to attempt to destroy their opponents, rather than to resolve an actual dispute over trademark law or any other legal matter [and also has a] documented history of vexatious behavior. [Furthermore], The Special Master has never seen a more glaring example of bad faith litigation than this."
- Francis "Coyote" Shivers, actor and singer, declared vexatious by the Los Angeles County Superior Court in 2008.
- Dorothy Squires, singer and former wife of actor Roger Moore; declared a vexatious litigant in 1987; legal fees led to her bankruptcy.
- Leo Stoller, a trademark troll, was declared a vexatious litigant by multiple U.S. federal courts, including the Supreme Court, in 2007.
- Isaac Wunder, who gave his name to the Isaac Wunder order which may be issued in Ireland to vexatious litigants.

== See also ==
- Abuse of process
- Chilling effect
- Barratry (common law)
- Franchise fraud
- Frivolous litigation
- Frivolous or vexatious
- Lawfare
- Legal abuse
- Malicious prosecution
- Pseudolaw
- Querulant
- Strategic lawsuit against public participation ("SLAPP")
- Isaac Wunder order
- Scientology and the legal system
- Pro se legal representation in the United States
