= Frivolous litigation =

Litigating for little to no meritful reason

Frivolous litigation is the use of legal processes with apparent disregard for the merit of one's own arguments. It includes presenting an argument with reason to know that it would certainly fail, or acting without a basic level of diligence in researching the relevant law and facts. That an argument was lost does not imply the argument was frivolous; a party may present an argument with a low chance of success, so long as it proceeds from applicable law.

Frivolous litigation may be based on absurd legal theories, may involve a superabundance or repetition of motions or additional suits, may be uncivil or harassing to the court, or may claim extreme remedies. A claim or defense may be frivolous because it had no underlying justification in fact, or because it was not presented with an argument for a reasonable extension or reinterpretation of the law. A claim may be deemed frivolous because existing laws unequivocally prohibit such a claim, such as a Good Samaritan law.

In the United States, Rule 11 of the Federal Rules of Civil Procedure and similar state rules require that an attorney perform a due diligence investigation concerning the factual basis for any claim or defense. Jurisdictions differ on whether a claim or defense can be frivolous if the attorney acted in good faith. Because such a defense or claim wastes the court's and the other parties' time, resources and legal fees, sanctions may be imposed by a court upon the party or the lawyer who presents the frivolous defense or claim. The law firm may also be sanctioned, or even held in contempt.

== US Federal statutes and rules of court penalizing frivolous litigation ==
In the United States Tax Court, frivolous arguments may result in a penalty of up to $25,000 under 26 U.S.C. § 6673(a)(1). Similarly, section 7482 of the Internal Revenue Code provides that the U.S. Supreme Court and the U.S. Courts of Appeals may impose penalties in which the taxpayer's appeal of a U.S. Tax Court decision was "maintained primarily for delay" or where "the taxpayer's position in the appeal is frivolous or groundless." A common example, as shown below, is an argument based on tax protestor claims.

In a noncriminal case in a U.S. District Court, a litigant (or a litigant's attorney) who presents any pleading, written motion or other paper to the court is required, under Rule 11 of the Federal Rules of Civil Procedure, to certify that, to the best of the presenter's knowledge and belief, the legal contentions "are warranted by existing law or by a nonfrivolous argument for the extension, modification, or reversal of existing law or the establishment of new law". Monetary civil penalties for violation of this rule may in some cases be imposed on the litigant or the attorney under Rule 11.

In one case, the Seventh Circuit Court issued an order giving such an attorney "14 days to show cause why he should not be fined $10,000 for his frivolous arguments". A similar rule penalizing frivolous litigation applies in U.S. Bankruptcy Court under Rule 9011.

The U.S. Congress has enacted section 1912 of Title 28 of the U.S.C. providing that in the U.S. Supreme Court and in the U.S. Courts of Appeals where litigation by the losing party has caused damage to the prevailing party, the court may impose a requirement that the losing party pay the prevailing party for those damages.

Litigants who represent themselves (in forma pauperis and pro se) sometimes make frivolous arguments due to their limited knowledge of the law and procedure. The particular tendency of prisoners to bring baseless lawsuits led to passage of the Prison Litigation Reform Act of 1995, which limits the ability of prisoners to bring actions without payment.

== Court treatment of frivolous arguments ==
An example of a Court's treatment of frivolous arguments is found in the case of Crain v. Commissioner, 737 F.2d 1417 (1984), from the United States Court of Appeals for the Fifth Circuit:

Glenn Crain appeals from the dismissal of his Tax Court petition challenging the constitutional authority of that body and defying the jurisdiction of the Internal Revenue Service to levy taxes on his income. Crain asserts that he "is not subject to the jurisdiction, taxation, nor regulation of the state," that the "Internal Revenue Service, Incorporated" lacks authority to exercise the judicial power of the United States, that the Tax Court is unconstitutionally attempting to exercise Article III powers, and that jurisdiction over his person has never been affirmatively proven.

We perceive no need to refute these arguments with somber reasoning and copious citation of precedent; to do so might suggest that these arguments have some colorable merit. The constitutionality of our income tax system—including the role played within that system by the Internal Revenue Service and the Tax Court—has long been established. We affirm the dismissal of Crain's spurious "petition" and the assessment of a penalty imposed by the Tax Court for instituting a frivolous proceeding. 26 U.S.C. § 6673.

The government asks us to assess penalties against Crain for bringing this frivolous appeal, as is authorized by Fed. R. App. P. 38. In Parker v. C. I. R., 724 F. 2d 469, 472 (5th Cir. 1984), we sounded "a cautionary note to those who would persistently raise arguments against the income tax which have been put to rest for years. The full range of sanctions in Rule 38 hereafter shall be summoned in response to a totally frivolous appeal."

We are sensitive to the need for the courts to remain open to all who seek in good faith to invoke the protection of law. An appeal that lacks merit is not always—or often—frivolous. However, we are not obliged to suffer in silence the filing of baseless, insupportable appeals presenting no colorable claims of error and designed only to delay, obstruct, or incapacitate the operations of the courts or any other governmental authority. Crain's present appeal is of this sort. It is a hodgepodge of unsupported assertions, irrelevant platitudes, and legalistic gibberish. The government should not have been put to the trouble of responding to such spurious arguments, nor this court to the trouble of "adjudicating" this meritless appeal.

Accordingly, we grant the government's request. The United States shall recover from appellant Crain twice its cost of this appeal. Additionally, we assess against Crain a damage award of $2000 in favor of the appellee United States.

== Impact upon filing attorney ==
Filing a claim that is ultimately deemed frivolous can be highly damaging to the attorney so filing. Most frivolous lawsuits that are successful are filed without an attorney. Attorney Daniel Evans writes:

[W]hen a judge calls an argument "ridiculous" or "frivolous," it is absolutely the worst thing the judge could say. It means that the person arguing the position has absolutely no idea of what he is doing, and has completely wasted everyone's time. It doesn't mean that the case wasn't well argued, or that judge simply decided for the other side, it means that there was no other side. The argument was absolutely, positively, incompetent. The judge is not telling you that you were "wrong." The judge is telling you that you are out of your mind.

== Examples ==
=== Washington v. Alaimo ===
In Washington v. Alaimo the court listed more than seventy-five frivolous "motions" (a request for a court to issue an order), all of which required the attention of the Court, including the following:

- "Motion to Behoove an Inquisition"
- "Motion for Judex Delegatus"
- "Motion for Restoration of Sanity"
- "Motion for Deinstitutionalization"
- "Motion for Publicity"
- "Motion to Vacate Jurisdiction"
- "Motion for Cesset processus"
- "Motion for Nunc pro tunc"
- "Motion for Psychoanalysis"
- "Motion to Impeach Judge Alaimo"
- "Motion to Renounce Citizenship"
- "Motion to Exhume Body of Alex Hodgson"
- "Motion to Invoke and Execute Rule 15—Retroactive Note: The Court's School Days are Over"
- "Motion for Skin Change Operation"
- "Motion for Catered Food Services"
- "Motion to Kiss My Ass"

Washington, an inmate from Georgia, was eventually prohibited from filing any future lawsuits or motions in any district court unless he first posted a contempt bond of $1,500. To be deemed frivolous, a litigant's arguments must strike beyond the pale.

=== Pearson v. Chung ===
In 2005, in Pearson v. Chung, Roy Pearson, a Washington, D.C. administrative law judge, sued a dry cleaning business for $67 million for allegedly losing a pair of his pants. This case has been cited as an example of frivolous litigation. According to Pearson, the dry cleaners lost his pants (which he brought in for a $10.50 alteration) and refused his demands for a large refund. Pearson believed that a sign saying "Satisfaction Guaranteed" in the window of the shop legally entitled him to a refund for the cost of the pants, estimated at $1,000. The $54 million total also included $2.0 million in "mental distress" and $15,000 which he estimated to be the cost of renting a car every weekend to go to another dry cleaners. The court ultimately ruled against Pearson, whose judgeship was subsequently not renewed due to this case and several other actions he filed during his divorce, which were found to demonstrate a lack of "judicial temperament".

=== Jonathan Lee Riches ===
In 2010, federal prosecutors asked a judge to help them stop Jonathan Lee Riches from filing any more lawsuits, arguing that his frequent filings were frivolous.

=== Gloria Dawn Ironbox ===
In July 2013, the Human Rights Tribunal of Ontario dismissed a complaint laid by a man posing as Gloria Dawn Ironbox, a fictional feminist attorney on television series Family Guy. The claimant alleged that a marketing scheme by A&W Restaurants was "heteronormative", "phallocentric" and promoted "cross-sectional hegemony". Citing feelings of distress and alienation over the lack of "LGBT" representation in A&W naming conventions, he demanded $50,000 in damages for injury to dignity and self-respect as well as an order requiring A&W to adopt naming conventions which include non-traditional families. One such product the claimant demanded was the "Pillow Biter", described by the claimant as "a large, dark slab of meat stuffed firmly between two, white, clenched buns".

=== Sirgiorgio Sanford Clardy ===
In January 2014, Sirgiorgio Sanford Clardy, who is serving a 100-year prison sentence for a beating of a prostitute and her customer, filed a $100 million lawsuit against Nike, in which he claimed that Nike was partially responsible for the assault he committed. Clardy said that Nike should have placed a label in his Jordan shoes warning consumers that they could be used as a dangerous weapon. He was wearing a pair when he repeatedly stomped the face of a client who was trying to leave a Portland hotel without paying Clardy's prostitute in June 2012. This lawsuit gained "considerable attention across the nation and the world".

=== Digital Homicide Studios ===
In March 2016, James Romine, one-half of the independent video games developer Digital Homicide Studios, sued video game critic James Stephanie Sterling for criticizing the games published under his studio’s name, seeking $10 million in damages for "assault, libel, and slander" to Romine's business. The lawsuit included claims of libel from Sterling referring to him as “Romino”, supposedly alleging mafia ties, and comparing him to the burglars in Home Alone. The case was dismissed with prejudice for lack of standing in February 2017. Romine was also accused of abusing of DMCA takedown requests on YouTube after issuing a request claiming that Sterling's coverage of his studio's game The Slaughtering Grounds as "Worst Game of 2014 Contender" was not protected under fair use law because it was "unfair" criticism to not review the entire game. Romine filed an additional lawsuit for $18 million against 100 users on the Steam gaming platform for criticizing their games and business practices, which he had interpreted as "harassment". The judge issued a subpoena against Valve to disclose the identities of those 100 users. This resulted in Valve removing all published games from Digital Homicide Studios.

=== Erik Estavillo vs Twitch, Inc ===
In June 2020, Erik Estavillo filed a lawsuit against Twitch, claiming that the streaming platform was responsible for his sex addiction, with damages of $25 million, which was to be split between him, Twitch Prime subscribers, and COVID-19 charities. He claimed that Twitch's "twisted programming and net code" made it "nearly impossible to use Twitch without being exposed to sexual content". Other claims included him "chafing his penis every day with [a fleshlight]" and causing a fire by ejaculating on his computer monitor. The filing contained pictures of the female Twitch streamers (such as Amouranth and Pokimane), who he wanted banned from the platform. Estavillo had previously sued Blizzard, Microsoft, Sony, and Nintendo. All of these lawsuits were dismissed with prejudice. This case was dismissed as frivolous in January 2021.

== See also ==
- Abuse of process
- Anders v. California
- Barratry
- Franchise fraud
- Frivolous or vexatious
- Judith Richardson Haimes
- Malicious prosecution
- Michigan Lawsuit Abuse Watch
- Pseudolaw
- Stella Awards
- SLAPP
- Spamigation
- Summary judgment
- Tax protester arguments
- Tax protester
- Tort reform
- Vexatious litigation
