= Michigan Lawsuit Abuse Watch =

Nonprofit organization

Michigan Lawsuit Abuse Watch is a non-profit 501 c(4) organization based in Novi, Michigan. It was created in 1997 with the goal to increase public awareness of what it views as the burden of "excessive litigation" is placing on families, job providers and communities in the United States and to promote policies to restore common sense to the civil justice system.

M-LAW holds itself out as a "grassroots" legal reform organization of consumers, businesses, professionals, community leaders, and other supporters who want to eliminate the negative effects many personal injury lawyers have had on America.

== Wacky Warning Label Contest ==
The organization sponsors several projects each year designed to focus public attention on what it views to be the side-effects associated with life in what it calls the most lawsuit-happy society on earth. Its popular Wacky Warning Label Contest receives worldwide media attention every January when its list of the wackiest warning labels is released. The contest was created to reveal how lawsuits have created the need for obvious warning labels on all sorts of consumer products. Each year, the grand prize winner receives a check for $500 and a copy of the bestselling book, The Death of Common Sense, by Philip K. Howard. M-LAW's president, Robert Dorigo Jones, is the author of Remove Child Before Folding: The 101 Stupidest, Silliest and Wackiest Warning Labels Ever.

== Funding ==
M-LAW is supported by private contributions and receives no government funding.

== See also ==
- Tort reform
