= Barratry (common law) =

Crime of pursuing groundless litigation

Barratry (/ˈbærətri/ BARR-ə-tree, from Old French barat ("deceit, trickery")) is a legal term that, at common law, described a criminal offence committed by people who are overly officious in instigating or encouraging prosecution of groundless litigation, or who bring repeated or persistent acts of litigation for the purposes of profit or harassment.

Although it remains a crime in some jurisdictions, barratry has frequently been abolished as being anachronistic and obsolete.

If barratrous litigation is deemed to be for the purpose of silencing critics, it is known as a strategic lawsuit against public participation (SLAPP). Jurisdictions that otherwise have no barratry laws may have SLAPP laws.

== Barratry by country ==
=== Australia ===
In Australia, the term barratry is predominantly used in the first sense of a frivolous or harassing litigant. The concept has fallen into disuse in Australia.

==== New South Wales ====
The offence of being a common barrator was abolished in New South Wales by Section 4A of the Maintenance, Champerty and Barratry Abolition Act 1993.

==== Victoria ====
The offence of being a common barrator was abolished in Victoria by section 2 of the Abolition of Obsolete Offences Act 1969.

=== Canada ===
In Canada, barratry, alongside all common law offences except contempt of court and contempt of Parliament, was abolished by the 1953 consolidation of the Criminal Code.

=== United Kingdom ===
==== England and Wales ====
In England and Wales the common law offence of being a common barrator was abolished by section 13(1)(a) of the Criminal Law Act 1967.

===== History =====
Being a common barrator was an offence under the common law of England. It was classified as a misdemeanor. It consisted of "persistently stirring up quarrels in the Courts or out of them". It is uncertain whether, in the ordinary way, persons charged with commission of the offence were dealt with by indictment.

In 1966, the Law Commission recommended for the offence to be abolished. It said that there had been no indictments for this offence for "many years" and that, as an indictable misdemeanor, it was "wholly obsolete". Its recommendation was implemented by the Criminal Law Act 1967.

==== Scotland ====
In Scots law, barratry referred to the crime committed by a judge who is induced by bribery to pronounce judgment.

=== United States ===
Several jurisdictions in the United States have declared barratry (in the sense of frivolous or harassing litigation) to be a crime as part of their tort reform efforts. For example, in the U.S. states of California, Oklahoma, Pennsylvania, Virginia, and Washington, barratry is a misdemeanor. In Texas, barratry is a misdemeanor on the first conviction, but a felony on subsequent convictions.

- California Penal Code Section 158: "Common barratry is the practice of exciting groundless judicial proceedings, and is punishable by imprisonment in the county jail not exceeding six months and by fine not exceeding one thousand dollars ($1,000)."
- California Penal Code Section 159: "No person can be convicted of common barratry except upon proof that he has excited suits or proceedings at law in at least three instances, and with a corrupt or malicious intent to vex and annoy."
- Revised Code of Washington 9.12.010: "Every person who brings on his or her own behalf, or instigates, incites, or encourages another to bring, any false suit at law or in equity in any court of this state, with intent thereby to distress or harass a defendant in the suit, or who serves or sends any paper or document purporting to be or resembling a judicial process, that is not in fact a judicial process, is guilty of a misdemeanor; and in case the person offending is an attorney, he or she may, in addition thereto be disbarred from practicing law within this state."
- Virginia laws on barratry, champerty, and maintenance were overturned by the Supreme Court of the United States in NAACP v. Button 371 U.S. 415 (1963).
- Vermont Statutes Title 13, § 701: "A person who is a common barrator shall be fined not more than $50.00 and become bound with sufficient surety for his or her good behavior for not less than one year."

== See also ==
- Abuse of process
- Ambulance chasing
- Champerty
- Forum shopping
- Frivolous or vexatious
- In terrorem
- Legal threat
- Legal advertising
- Vexatious litigation
- Isaac Wunder order
