= Canadian tort law =

Aspect of Canadian law

Canadian tort law is composed of two parallel systems: a common law framework outside Québec and a civil law framework within Québec, making the law system is bijural, as it is used throughout Canadian provinces except for Québec, which uses private law. (Note: The Quebec private law was originally derived from that which existed in France at the time of Québec's annexation into the British Empire, it was overhauled and codified first in the Civil Code of Lower Canada and later in the current Civil Code of Quebec, which codifies most elements of tort law as part of its provisions on the broader law of obligations.) In nine of Canada's ten provinces and three territories, tort law originally derives that of England and Wales but has developed distinctly since Canadian Confederation in 1867 and has been influenced by jurisprudence in other common law jurisdictions. As most aspects of tort law in Canada are the subject of provincial jurisdiction under the Canadian Constitution, tort law varies even between the country's common law provinces and territories.

In the country's common law provinces, a tort consists of a wrongful acts or injury that lead to physical, emotional, or financial damage to a person in which another person could be held legally responsible. The two main subcategories of tort law are intentional torts and unintentional torts. Similarly in Québec, there are four conditions necessary for a finding of civil liability under the CCQ:

- Imputability: The capacity of a tortfeasor to "discern right from wrong", and to understand the consequences of their actions.
- Fault: The failure of a tortfeasor to act as "a normally prudent and reasonable person" would have in similar circumstances.
- Damage: Harm or injury suffered by the plaintiff
- Causation: A causal link between the fault of the tortfeasor and the damage incurred by the plaintiff.

The defendant in a tort suit is called the tortfeasor, and most often, financial compensation is what tort victims acquire. All torts require proof of fault in order to determine legal responsibility, however, fault is measured differently for the different types of tort. There are criminal code offences in Canada that could also qualify as tort law under common law. However, most victims do not sue those who are criminally charged since the accused do not have the financial means to pay back the victim or because the accused is incarcerated.

== Common law provinces ==
Torts in the common law provinces are composed of statutory torts, where civil liability is established by a provincial statute, and common law torts, where civil liability for a particular course of conduct is established by judicial precedent. Common law torts in Canada were primarily inherited from the law of England and Wales by reception statutes enacted in the various provinces and territories, such as Ontario's Property and Civil Rights Act, but have since developed independently as local courts established new precedent; the legislatures modified, codified, or eliminated torts inherited from English jurisprudence; and jurisprudence from other jurisdictions influenced Canadian courts, as was notably the case with the influence of the Scots law decision in Donoghue v Stevenson in shaping product liability law in Canada and in other common law jurisdictions. As in other common law jurisdictions, Canadian torts can broadly be divided into negligence, property torts, dignitary torts, economic torts, and torts (trespass) against the person.

=== Torts against the person ===
Torts (trespass) against the person includes torts that causes physical harm to the complainant, such as:

- Assault (tort) – Intentionally and voluntarily causing the reasonable apprehension of an immediate harmful or offensive contact. Assault has the following components:
  - Threat by one person to commit unwanted physical contact to another person
  - Reasonable belief to feel threatened with imminent harm
- Battery (tort) – Bringing about an unconsentful harmful or offensive contact with a person or to something closely associated with that person (such as an item of clothing). Battery has the following components:
  - Unwanted direct or indirect physical contact
  - Contact was intentional
- False imprisonment – A person is intentionally confined without legal authority. False imprisonment has the following components:
  - Deprivation of liberty
  - Lack of lawful authority
- False arrest – A person is unlawfully and intentionally arrested by a peace officer or another individual with similar authorities with insufficient reason to arrest (i.e. lack of probable cause) or excessive force.
- Intentional infliction of emotional distress – Intentional conduct that results in extreme emotional distress.

=== Negligence ===
Negligence is a cause of action leading to relief designed to protect legal rights (Note: Depending on province, this includes those of personal safety, property, and intangible economic interests or noneconomic interests such as the tort of negligent infliction of emotional distress) from actions which, although unintentional, nevertheless cause some form of legal harm to the plaintiff. In the common law provinces, there are four elements of negligence required for a particular course of conduct to be considered tortious:

- Duty: The purported tortfeasor must owe the plaintiff a duty of care, something which may arise from a variety of different factors such as the nature of a situation (e.g. a person driving a vehicle or engaging in some other foreseeably risky activity owes a duty to individuals reasonably likely to be injured such as pedestrians) or the relationship between the parties (e.g. a doctor and a patient).
- Breach: The conduct complained of must constitute a breach of the standard of care associated with the aforementioned duty. Typically this means that the court will employ a reasonable person standard in assessing whether or not the respondent's actions were negligent.
- Damage: The plaintiff must have suffered damage.
- Causation: The conduct complained of must either be the proximate cause or the cause in fact of the damage suffered by the plaintiff. In the former case, the respondent's conduct is the proximate cause of the damage if it could have been reasonably foreseen. In the latter case, the conduct is the cause in fact of the damage suffered by the plaintiff if the damage would not have occurred but for the respondent's conduct.

In the common law provinces, courts have restricted the types of damage for which a plaintiff may seek monetary compensation. For instance, pure economic loss may only lead to monetary compensation in a limited set of circumstances established by precedent; at present, these are 1) negligent misrepresentation or performance of a service, 2) negligent supply of shoddy goods or structures, and 3) relational economic loss between parties to a contract. Even where a plaintiff demonstrates that the conduct complained of falls within the circumstances in which pure economic loss may be recovered, they must demonstrate that they were in a "sufficiently proximate relationship" with the respondent. Prior to the ruling in Cooper v. Hobart in 2001, this analysis was grounded in mere foreseeability of injury; however, following the ruling, both the proximity of the parties' relationship and foreseeability of injury must be proved. Per the ruling in Cooper, courts in the common law province apply a two-step analytical framework based on the Anns test previously applied in England and Wales under which a court will award damages for pure economic loss where the conduct falls within the established categories established by present and, if the conduct does not fall into any established category, will then proceed to examine public policy reasons for and against the recognition of a new duty of care.

In the case of Hill v. Hamilton-Wentworth Regional Police Services Board, Mr. Hill was charged with ten counts of robbery, however, he was soon acquitted of all charges. After the charges were dropped, he then sued Hamilton's police service as well as some of the officers who were involved in his arrest. Hill argued that the police were negligent in conducting a thorough investigation because the police officers did not properly interview the witnesses, which ultimately led to his arrest. Hill's lawsuit was eventually overturned by the Supreme Court of Canada because there was not enough evidence to support Hill's findings that the police were negligent in their duty or standard of care. What is important to note about this particular trial is that three out of the nine Supreme Court Judges did not view the negligent tort claim as being lawful or practical because a strict duty of care towards suspects would therefore interfere with how the police operate in terms of apprehending offenders and investigating crimes.

=== Property torts ===
Property torts are civil causes of action aimed at seeking damages for interference with a plaintiff's property, including both immovable property and movable property or chattel. The most significant torts within this category are the two categories of trespass to property:

- Trespass to land – Committed when an individual intentionally enters the land of another without lawful excuse. It is actionable per se, and thus the party whose land was entered may sue even if no actual harm is done, the only requirement is that the respondent not have the express or implied consent of the property owner to enter. In most provinces, trespass to land may also constitute a provincial offence (e.g. Ontario's Trespass to Property Act which provides for compensation for property owners and extinguishes the right to sue under tort law where a property owner receives such compensation under section 12 of the act) but not a criminal offence as criminal law is a federal rather than provincial power in Canada.
- Trespass to chattels – Committed when an individual intentionally interferes with the personal property of another. Slight deprivation, like briefly placing a hand on someone else's car, is not actionable.

The other property torts extant in the common law provinces are:

- Conversion (law) – An intentional tort to personal property where the defendant's willful interference with the chattel deprives plaintiff of the possession of the same.
- Nuisance – Denial of quiet enjoyment to owners of real property. A private nuisance is an unreasonable, unwarranted, or unlawful interference with another person's private use and enjoyment of his or her property; whereas a public nuisance is an interference with the rights of the public generally. The test to determine whether an interference is reasonable is whether the gravity of the harm is outweighed by the social benefit of the nuisance.

=== Dignitary torts ===
Dignitary torts are a specific category of torts where the cause of action is being subjected to certain types of indignities. The most notable dignitary torts in the common law provinces are libel and slander; however, this category also includes torts pertaining to privacy and to vexatious litigation.

- Defamation – The communication of a statement that makes a false claim, expressively stated or implied to be factual, that may harm the reputation of an entity.
  - Libel – Written defamation
  - Slander – Spoken defamation
- Invasion of privacy or intrusion upon seclusion – The unlawful intrusion into the personal life of another person without just cause. (Note: Four provinces, British Columbia, Manitoba, Newfoundland and Saskatchewan have created a statutory tort. Ontario has recognized the existence of the tort of invasion of privacy called "intrusion upon seclusion". British Columbia, on the other hand, has held that the tort does not exist in that province under the common law.) Currently, there is no consistent approach surrounding the tort of invasion of privacy in Canada.
- Breach of confidence – Protects private information conveyed in confidence; typically requires that the information be of a confidential nature, communicated in confidence, and was disclosed to the detriment of the claimant.
- Abuse of process – A malicious and deliberate misuse or perversion of regularly issued court process not justified by the underlying legal action.
- Malicious prosecution – Similar to abuse of process, but includes intent, pursuing without probable cause, and dismissal in favor of the victim.
- There has been some debate over whether there was a common law tort of discrimination. This was eventually dismissed by the Supreme Court in Bhadauria v. Seneca College. This issue was further examined by the court through Honda Canada Inc. v. Keays, [2008] 2 S.C.R. 362, 2008 SCC 39

=== Economic torts ===
Economic torts are a specific category of torts that provide the common law rules on liability which arise out of business transactions such as interference with economic or business relationships and are likely to involve pure economic loss. Also called business torts.

- Fraud – Making of a false representation by one party with an intention to induce another party into an act of commission or omission owing to which the later party suffers a damage. The first Party may or may not be the benefited by the damage caused to second party. Also, the first party need not be in collusion with someone who actually benefited.
- Tortious interference – One person intentionally damages the plaintiff's contractual or other business relationships.
- Conspiracy (civil) – An agreement between two or more parties to deprive a third party of legal rights or deceive a third party to obtain an illegal objective.
- Restraint of trade – Contractual obligations not to trade are illegal agreements on public policy grounds unless they are reasonable in the interests concerning both parties and the public at large; this mainly affects post-termination restrictive covenants in employment contracts.
- Passing off – The tort of selling goods or services in a manner that falsely causes customers to believe they originate from a different brand or supplier. In Canada, passing off is both a common law tort and a statutory cause of action under the federal Trade-marks Act referring to the deceptive representation or marketing of goods or services by competitors in a manner that confuses consumers. The law of passing off protects the goodwill of businesses by preventing competitors from passing off their goods as those of another.

== Québec ==
Private law in the Canadian province of Québec at the time of its annexation by the British Empire was originally derived from pre-Napoleonic French law but was eventually codified in the Civil Code of Lower Canada and later the present Code Civil du Québec (CCQ). The CCQ provides for broad and generally open-ended "civil liability" or la responsabilité civile in article 1457:

Every person has a duty to abide by the rules of conduct incumbent on him, according to the circumstances, usage or law, so as not to cause injury to another. Where he is endowed with reason and fails in this duty, he is liable for any injury he causes to another by such fault and is bound to make reparation for the injury, whether it be bodily, moral or material in nature. He is also bound, in certain cases, to make reparation for injury caused to another by the act, omission or fault of another person or by the act of things in his custody.

The CCQ provides for and defines the scope of civil liability for damages caused by inanimate objects. Article 1465 makes the general provision that the custodian of a thing or object (bien) is liable for any damage caused by it, while article 1466 provides that the owner of an animal is liable for damage or injury caused by it even if it had escaped from their custody at the time of the incident. Similarly, article 1467 imposes liability for damages caused by the ruin of an immovable (i.e. a building or other fixed structure) upon its owner even if construction defects are the ultimate cause of the ruin. Strict liability is imposed upon the manufacturers of moveable things (i.e. product liability) by article 1468 for injuries caused by safety defects. (Note: Article 1469 provides that: "A thing has a safety defect where, having regard to all the circumstances, it does not afford the safety which a person is normally entitled to expect, particularly by reason of a defect in design or manufacture, poor preservation or presentation, or the lack of sufficient indications as to the risks and dangers it involves or as to the means to avoid them".) An individual is exempt from civil liability in cases of force majeure (article 1470), harm caused in the process of assisting or rescuing another (article 1471), and in certain other cases prescribed by law.

=== Privacy and reputational rights ===
An important aspect of civil liability law in Québec is the individual right to privacy and dignity. In title two of book one, the CCQ provides for a series of rights comparable to but broader than the privacy torts extant in both the common law provinces and in France and other jurisdictions with civil codes based on the Napoleonic Code. Chapter III provides that "every person has a right to the respect of his reputation and privacy" and that the acts which may be considered invasions of an individual's privacy include:

- (1) entering or taking anything in his dwelling;
- (2) intentionally intercepting or using his private communications;
- (3) appropriating or using his image or voice while he is in private premises;
- (4) keeping his private life under observation by any means;
- (5) using his name, image, likeness or voice for a purpose other than the legitimate information of the public;
- (6) using his correspondence, manuscripts or other personal documents.

Additionally, a person may not collect data regarding another individual without a "serious and legitimate reason", must only collect "information which is relevant to the stated objective", and may not provide such information to third parties or use it for reasons unrelated to the objective; furthermore, in the process of gathering or using such information, one may not "invade the privacy or injure the reputation" of the individual. In addition to the broad tortious liability established by these principles, the chapter also creates a cause of action for individuals to inspect and sue for the rectification of inaccurate information concerning them.

This, together with the general liability established under article 1457, forms the basis for defamation and invasion of privacy as causes of action in Québec. To establish civil liability for defamation, the plaintiff must establish, on a balance of probabilities, the existence of an injury, a wrongful act, and of a causal connection between the two. A person who has made defamatory remarks will not necessarily be civilly liable for them. The plaintiff must further demonstrate that the person who made the remarks committed a wrongful act. Therefore, communicating false information is not, in itself, a wrongful act. In 1994, the Court of Appeal of Quebec held that defamation in Québec must be governed by a reasonableness standard, as opposed to the strict liability standard that was applicable at the time in the common law provinces; a defendant who made a false statement would not be held liable if it was reasonable to believe the statement was true. Later, in upholding the "responsible communication" defence in Grant v. Torstar, the Supreme Court of Canada extended this standard to the country's common law provinces as well.
