= Tort =

Legal claim of civil wrong

A tort is a civil wrong, other than breach of contract, that causes a claimant to suffer loss or harm, resulting in legal liability for the person who commits the tortious act. Tort law can be contrasted with criminal law, which deals with criminal wrongs that are punishable by the state. While criminal law aims to punish individuals who commit crimes, tort law aims to compensate individuals who suffer harm as a result of the actions of others. (Note: According to Lord Bingham in a landmark English tort case, 'The overall object of tort law is to define cases in which the law may justly hold one party liable to compensate another.') Some wrongful acts, such as assault and battery, can result in both a civil lawsuit and a criminal prosecution in countries where the civil and criminal legal systems are separate. Tort law may also be contrasted with contract law, which provides civil remedies after breach of a duty that arises from a contract. Obligations in both tort and criminal law are more fundamental and are imposed regardless of whether the parties have a contract.

While tort law in civil law jurisdictions largely derives from Roman law, common law jurisdictions derive their tort law from customary English tort law. In civil law jurisdictions based on civil codes, both contractual and tortious or delictual liability is typically outlined in a civil code based on Roman Law principles. Tort law is referred to as the law of delict in Scots and Roman Dutch law, and resembles tort law in common law jurisdictions in that rules regarding civil liability are established primarily by precedent and theory rather than an exhaustive code. However, like other civil law jurisdictions, the underlying principles are drawn from Roman law. A handful of jurisdictions have codified a mixture of common and civil law jurisprudence either due to their colonial past (e.g. Québec, St Lucia, Mauritius) or due to influence from multiple legal traditions when their civil codes were drafted (e.g. Mainland China, the Philippines, and Thailand). Furthermore, Israel essentially codifies common law provisions on tort.

== Overview ==
In common, civil, and mixed law jurisdictions alike, the main remedy available to plaintiffs under tort law is compensation in damages, or money. Further, in the case of a continuing tort, or even where harm is merely threatened, the courts will sometimes grant an injunction, such as in the English case of Miller v Jackson. Usually injunctions will not impose positive obligations on tortfeasors, but some jurisdictions, such as those in Australia, can make an order for specific performance to ensure that the defendant carries out certain legal obligations, especially in relation to nuisance matters. At the same time, each legal system provides for a variety of defences for defendants in tort claims which, partially or fully, shield defendants from liability. In a limited range of cases varying between jurisdictions, tort law will tolerate self-help as an appropriate remedy for certain torts. One example of this is the toleration of the use of reasonable force to expel a trespasser, which is typically also a defence against the tort of battery.

In some, but not all, civil and mixed law jurisdictions, the term delict is used to refer to this category of civil wrong, though it can also refer to criminal offences. Other jurisdictions may use terms such as extracontractual responsibility (France) or civil responsibility (Québec). In comparative law, the term tort is generally used. (Note: For instance, despite the common belief that the term "tort" exclusively refers to civil liability in common law jurisdictions, Wikipedia has articles discussing conflict of tort laws, European tort law, and Tort Law in China, only using the term delict in articles about jurisdictions which specifically use the term to refer to torts (e.g. Scots Law of Delict and South African law of delict). Similarly, the English version of the Civil Code of the People's Republic of China, uses the term "tortfeasor" to refer to individuals who incur civil liability.) The word 'tort' was first used in a legal context in the 1580s, (Note: The word is derived from Old French and Anglo-French "tort" (injury), which is derived from Medieval Latin tortum.) although different words were used for similar concepts prior to this time. A person who commits a tortious act is called a tortfeasor. Although crimes may be torts, the cause of legal action in civil torts is not necessarily the result of criminal action. A victim of harm, commonly called the injured party or plaintiff, can recover their losses as damages in a lawsuit. To prevail, the plaintiff in the lawsuit must generally show that the tortfeasor's actions or lack of action was the proximate cause of the harm, though the specific requirements vary between jurisdictions.

== Common law ==
=== History ===
Torts and crimes in common law originate in the Germanic system of compensatory fines for wrongs, with no clear distinction between crimes and other wrongs. In Anglo-Saxon law, most wrongs required payment in money paid to the wronged person or their clan. Fines in the form of wīte (lit. 'blame' or 'fault') were paid to the king or holder of a court for disturbances of public order, while the fine of weregild was imposed on those who committed murder with the intention of preventing blood feuds. Some wrongs in later law codes were botleas 'without remedy' (e.g. theft, open murder, arson, treason against one's lord), that is, unable to be compensated, and those convicted of a botleas crime were at the king's mercy. Items or creatures which caused death were also destroyed as deodands. Alfred the Great's Doom Book distinguished unintentional injuries from intentional ones, and defined culpability based on status, age, and gender. After the Norman Conquest, fines were paid only to courts or the king, and quickly became a revenue source. A wrong became known as a tort or trespass, and there arose a division between civil pleas and pleas of the crown. The petty assizes (i.e. of novel disseisin, of mort d'ancestor, and of darrein presentment) were established in 1166 as a remedy for interference with possession of freehold land. The trespass action was an early civil plea in which damages were paid to the victim; if no payment was made, the defendant was imprisoned. It arose in local courts for slander, breach of contract, or interference with land, goods, or persons. Although the details of its exact origin are unclear, it became popular in royal courts so that in the 1250s the writ of trespass was created and made de cursu (available by right, not fee); however, it was restricted to interference with land and forcible breaches of the king's peace. It may have arisen either out of the "appeal of felony", or assize of novel disseisin, or replevin. Later, after the Statute of Westminster 1285, in the 1360s, the "trespass on the case" action arose for when the defendant did not direct force. As its scope increased, it became simply "action on the case". The English Judicature Act passed 1873 through 1875 abolished the separate actions of trespass and trespass on the case.

In 1401, the English case Beaulieu v Finglam imposed strict liability for the escape of fire (i.e. for letting one's fire spread to neighboring land); additionally, strict liability was imposed for the release of cattle. Negligently handling fire was of particular importance in these societies given capacity for destruction and relatively limited firefighting resources. Liability for common carrier, which arose around 1400, was also emphasised in the medieval period. Unintentional injuries were relatively infrequent in the medieval period. As transportation improved and carriages became popular in the 18th and 19th centuries, however, collisions and carelessness became more prominent in court records. In general, scholars of England such as William Blackstone took a hostile view to litigation, and rules against champerty and maintenance and vexatious litigation existed. The right of victims to receive redress was regarded by later English scholars as one of the rights of Englishmen. Blackstone's Commentaries on the Laws of England, which was published in the late 18th century, contained a volume on "private wrongs" as torts and even used the word tort in a few places.

In contemporary common law jurisdictions, successful claimants in both tort and contract law must show that they have suffered foreseeable loss or harm as a direct result of the breach of duty. (Note: Under the UK Contracts (Rights of Third Parties) Act 1999, a person may enforce a contract even when they are not a party to it.) (Note: If an employee injures himself in the course and scope of employment, he will be both tortfeasor and claimant under the rule of vicarious liability.) Legal injuries addressable under tort law in common law jurisdictions are not limited to physical injuries and may include emotional, economic, (Note: Pure economic loss is rarely recoverable.) or reputational injuries as well as violations of privacy, property, or constitutional rights. Torts comprise such varied topics as automobile accidents, false imprisonment, defamation, product liability, copyright infringement, and environmental pollution (toxic torts). Modern torts are heavily affected by insurance and insurance law, as many cases are settled through claims adjustment rather than by trial, and are defended by insurance lawyers, with the insurance policy setting a ceiling on the possible payment.

=== Liability ===
While individuals and corporations are typically only liable for their own actions, indirect liability for the tortious acts of others may arise by operation of law, notably through joint and several liability doctrines as well as forms of secondary liability. Liability may arise through enterprise liability or, in product liability cases in the United States, market share liability. In certain cases, a person might hold vicarious liability for their employee or child under the law of agency through the doctrine of respondeat superior. For example, if a shop employee spilled cleaning liquid on the supermarket floor and a victim fell and suffered injuries, the plaintiff might be able to sue either the employee or the employer. There is considerable academic debate about whether vicarious liability is justified on no better basis than the search for a solvent defendant, or whether it is well founded on the theory of efficient risk allocation.

Absolute liability, under the rule in M. C. Mehta v. Union of India, in Indian tort law is a unique outgrowth of the doctrine of strict liability for ultrahazardous activities. Under the precedent established in the English case of Rylands v Fletcher, upon which the Indian doctrine of absolute liability is based, anyone who in the course of "non-natural" use of his land "accumulates" thereon for his own purposes anything likely to cause mischief if it escapes is answerable for all direct damage thereby caused. While, in England and many other common law jurisdictions, this precedent is used to impose strict liability on certain areas of nuisance law and is strictly "a remedy for damage to land or interests in land" under which "damages for personal injuries are not recoverable", Indian courts have developed this rule into a distinct principle of absolute liability, where an enterprise is absolutely liable, without exceptions, to compensate everyone affected by any accident resulting from the operation of hazardous activity. This differs greatly from the English approach as it includes all kinds of resulting liability, rather than being limited to damage to land.

In New Zealand, the tort system for the majority of personal injuries was scrapped with the establishment of the Accident Compensation Corporation, a universal system of no-fault insurance. The rationale underlying New Zealand's elimination of personal injury torts was securing equality of treatment for victims regardless of whether or the extent to which they or any other party was at fault. This was the basis for much of Professor Patrick Atiyah's scholarship as articulated in Accidents, Compensation and the Law (1970). Originally his proposal was the gradual abolition of tort actions, and its replacement with schemes like those for industrial injuries to cover for all illness, disability and disease, whether caused by people or nature. In addition to the development of the Accident Compensation Corporation to eliminate personal injury lawsuits, the tort system for medical malpractice was scrapped in New Zealand, both following recommendations from the Royal Commission in 1967 for 'no fault' compensation scheme (see The Woodhouse Report).

In the case of the United States, a survey of trial lawyers identified several modern innovations that developed after the divergence of English and American tort law, including strict liability for products based on Greenman v. Yuba Power Products, the limitation of various immunities (e.g. sovereign immunity, charitable immunity), comparative negligence, broader rules for admitting evidence, increased damages for emotional distress, and toxic torts and class action lawsuits. However, there has also been a reaction in terms of tort reform, which in some cases have been struck down as violating state constitutions, and federal preemption of state laws.

=== Categories of torts in common law jurisdictions ===
Torts may be categorised in several ways, with a particularly common division between negligent and intentional torts. Quasi-torts are unusual tort actions. Particularly in the United States, "collateral tort" is used to refer to torts in labour law such as intentional infliction of emotional distress ("outrage"); or wrongful dismissal; these evolving causes of action are debated and overlap with contract law or other legal areas to some degree. In some cases, the development of tort law has spurred lawmakers to create alternative solutions to disputes. For example, in some areas, workers' compensation laws arose as a legislative response to court rulings restricting the extent to which employees could sue their employers in respect of injuries sustained during employment. In other cases, legal commentary has led to the development of new causes of action outside the traditional common law torts. These are loosely grouped into quasi-torts or liability torts.

==== Negligence ====
The tort of negligence is a cause of action leading to relief designed to protect legal rights (Note: Depending on jurisdiction, this includes those of personal safety, property, and intangible economic interests or noneconomic interests such as the tort of negligent infliction of emotional distress) from actions which, although unintentional, nevertheless cause some form of legal harm to the plaintiff. In order to win an action for negligence, a plaintiff must prove: duty, breach of duty, causation, scope of liability, and damages. Further, a defendant may assert various defences to a plaintiff's case, including comparative fault and assumption of risk. Negligence is a tort which arises from the breach of the duty of care owed by one person to another from the perspective of a reasonable person. Although credited as appearing in the United States in Brown v. Kendall, the later Scottish case of Donoghue v Stevenson [1932] AC 562, followed in England, brought England into line with the United States and established the 'tort of negligence' as opposed to negligence as a component in specific actions. In Donoghue, Mrs. Donoghue drank from an opaque bottle containing a decomposed snail and claimed that it had made her ill. She could not sue Mr. Stevenson for damages for breach of contract and instead sued for negligence. The majority determined that the definition of negligence can be divided into four component parts that the plaintiff must prove to establish negligence.

In most common law jurisdictions, there are four elements to a negligence action:

1. duty: the defendant has a duty to others, including the plaintiff, to exercise reasonable care (Note: For example, in the business realm, the auditor has a duty of care to the company they are auditing – that the documents created are a true and reliable representation of the company's financial position. However, as per Esanda Finance Corporation Ltd v. Peat Marwick Hungerfords, such auditors do NOT provide a duty of care to third parties who rely on their reports. An exception is where the auditor provides the third party with a privity letter, explicitly stating the third party can rely on the report for a specific purpose. In such cases, the privity letter establishes a duty of care.)
2. breach: the defendant breaches that duty through an act or culpable omission
3. damages: as a result of that act or omission, the plaintiff suffers an injury
4. causation: the injury to the plaintiff is a reasonably foreseeable (Note: The case Chapman v Hearse added to the precedent of negligence where in previous cases reasonable foreseeability was applied narrowly to include all predictable actions, Chapman v Hearse extended this to include all damages of the same nature which could be reasonably foreseen.) consequence of the defendant's act or omission under the proximate cause doctrine. (Note: Proximate cause means that you must be able to show that the harm was caused by the tort you are suing for. The defendant may argue that there was a prior cause or a superseding intervening cause. A common situation where a prior cause becomes an issue is the personal injury car accident, where the person re-injures an old injury. For example, someone who has a bad back is injured in the back in a car accident. Years later, he is still in pain. He must prove the pain is caused by the car accident, and not the natural progression of the previous problem with the back. A superseding intervening cause happens shortly after the injury. For example, if, after the accident, the doctor who works on you commits malpractice and injures you further, the defendant can argue that it was not the accident, but the incompetent doctor who caused your injury.)

Some jurisdictions narrow the definition down to three elements: duty, breach and proximately caused harm. Some jurisdictions recognize five elements, duty, breach, actual cause, proximate cause, and damages. However, at their heart, the various definitions of what constitutes negligent conduct are very similar. Depending on jurisdiction, product liability cases such as those involving warranties may be considered negligence actions or fall under a separate category of strict liability torts. Similarly, cases involving environmental or consumer health torts which other countries treat as negligence or strict liability torts are treated in India as absolute liability torts.

In establishing whether a duty of care exists, different common law jurisdictions have developed a variety of distinct but related approaches, with many jurisdictions building on the test established in Anns v Merton LBC. In Singapore, the current leading case is Spandeck Engineering v Defence Science and Technology Agency, which builds on Anns by establishing a two step test comprising an analysis of proximate cause and public policy as a universal test, independent from the individual circumstances of a given case, for determining the existence of a duty of care. The Supreme Court of Canada established a similar test in the context of assessing damages for pure economic loss owing to negligence derived from Anns which consists of a two step examination of the existence of a sufficiently proximate relationship between the parties and public policy considerations; however, the Canadian test is more sensitive to the individual circumstances of a given case and the first step is generally deemed to be met where a case falls into one of three sets of circumstances recognised by precedent while the Singaporean test is independent of precedent. In English tort law, Caparo Industries plc v Dickman established a tripartite test for the existence of a duty of care per which harm must be reasonably foreseeable as a potential result of the defendant's conduct; the parties must be in a relationship of proximity; and it must be fair, just, and reasonable to impose such a duty.

==== Intentional torts ====
Intentional torts are any intentional acts that are reasonably foreseeable to cause harm to an individual, and that do so. Intentional torts have several subcategories:

- Torts against the person include assault, battery, false imprisonment, intentional infliction of emotional distress, and fraud, although the latter is also an economic tort.
- Property torts involve any intentional interference with the property rights of the claimant (plaintiff). Those commonly recognised include trespass to land, trespass to chattels (personal property), and conversion.
- Dignitary torts are a category of intentional tort affecting the honour, dignity, and reputation of an individual and include: Defamation, (Note: Defamation is tarnishing the reputation of someone; it has two varieties, slander and libel. Slander is spoken defamation and libel is printed or broadcast defamation. The two otherwise share the same features: making a factual assertion for which evidence does not exist. Defamation does not affect or hinder the voicing of opinions, but does occupy the same fields as rights to free speech in the First Amendment to the Constitution of the United States, or Article 10 of the European Convention of Human Rights. Related to defamation in the U.S. are the actions for misappropriation of publicity, invasion of privacy, and disclosure. Abuse of process and malicious prosecution are often classified as dignitary torts as well.) invasion of privacy, breach of confidence, torts related to the justice system such as malicious prosecution and abuse of process, and torts pertaining to sexual relations that are considered obsolete in most common law jurisdictions such as alienation of affection and criminal conversation.

An intentional tort requires an overt act, some form of intent, and causation. In most cases, transferred intent, which occurs when the defendant intends to injure an individual but actually ends up injuring another individual, will satisfy the intent requirement. Causation can be satisfied as long as the defendant was a substantial factor in causing the harm.

==== Nuisance ====
"Nuisance" is traditionally used to describe an activity which is harmful or annoying to others such as indecent conduct or a rubbish heap. Nuisances either affect private individuals (private nuisance) or the general public (public nuisance). The claimant can sue for most acts that interfere with their use and enjoyment of their land. In English law, whether activity was an illegal nuisance depended upon the area and whether the activity was "for the benefit of the commonwealth", with richer areas subject to a greater expectation of cleanliness and quiet. The case Jones v Powell (1629) provides an early example, in which a person's professional papers were damaged by the vapors of a neighboring brewery. Although the outcome of this case is unclear, Whitelocke of the Court of the King's Bench is recorded as saying that since the water supply in area was already contaminated, the nuisance was not actionable as it is "better that they should be spoiled than that the commonwealth stand in need of good liquor".

In English law, a related category of tort liability was created in the case of Rylands v Fletcher (1868): strict liability was established for a dangerous escape of some hazard, including water, fire, or animals as long as the cause was not remote. In Cambridge Water Co Ltd v Eastern Counties Leather plc (1994), chemicals from a factory seeped through a floor into the water table, contaminating East Anglia's water reservoirs. The Rylands rule remains in use in England and Wales. In Australian law, it has been merged into negligence.

==== Economic torts ====
Economic torts (Note: Also referred to as "business torts") typically involve commercial transactions, and include tortious interference with trade or contract, fraud, injurious falsehood, and negligent misrepresentation. Negligent misrepresentation torts are distinct from contractual cases involving misrepresentation in that there is no privity of contract; these torts are likely to involve pure economic loss which has been less-commonly recoverable in tort. One criterion for determining whether economic loss is recoverable is the "foreseeability" doctrine. The economic loss rule is highly confusing and inconsistently applied and began in 1965 from a California case involving strict liability for product defects; in 1986, the U.S. Supreme Court adopted the doctrine in East River S.S. Corp. v. Transamerica Deleval, Inc. In 2010, the supreme court of the U.S. state of Washington replaced the economic loss doctrine with an "independent duty doctrine".

Economic antitrust torts have been somewhat submerged by modern competition law. However, in the United States, private parties are permitted in certain circumstances to sue for anticompetitive practices, including under federal or state statutes or on the basis of common law tortious interference, which may be based upon the Restatement (Second) of Torts §766.

Negligent misrepresentation as tort where no contractual privity exists was disallowed in England by Derry v Peek [1889]; however, this position was overturned in Hedley Byrne v Heller in 1964 so that such actions were allowed if a "special relationship" existed between the plaintiff and defendant. United States courts and scholars "paid lip-service" to Derry; however, scholars such as William Prosser argued that it was misinterpreted by English courts. The case of Ultramares Corporation v. Touche (1932) limited the liability of an auditor to known identified beneficiaries of the audit and this rule was widely applied in the United States until the 1960s. The Restatement (Second) of Torts expanded liability to "foreseeable" users rather than specifically identified "foreseen" users of the information, dramatically expanding liability and affecting professionals such as accountants, architects, attorneys, and surveyors. As of 1989, most U.S. jurisdictions follow either the Ultramares approach or the Restatement approach.

The tort of deceit for inducement into a contract is a tort in English law, but in practice has been replaced by actions under Misrepresentation Act 1967. In the United States, similar torts existed but have become superseded to some degree by contract law and the pure economic loss rule. Historically (and to some degree today), fraudulent (but not negligent) misrepresentation involving damages for economic loss may be awarded under the "benefit-of-the-bargain" rule (damages identical to expectation damages in contracts) which awards the plaintiff the difference between the value represented and the actual value. Beginning with Stiles v. White (1846) in Massachusetts, this rule spread across the country as a majority rule with the "out-of-pocket damages" rule as a minority rule. Although the damages under the "benefit-of-the-bargain" are described as compensatory, the plaintiff is left better off than before the transaction. Since the economic loss rule would eliminate these benefits if applied strictly, there is an exception to allow the misrepresentation tort if not related to a contract.

=== Remedies and defences in common law jurisdictions ===
The remedies and defences available in common law jurisdictions are typically similar, deriving from judicial precedent with occasional legislative intervention. Compensation by way of damages is typically the default remedy available to plaintiffs, with injunctions and specific performance being relatively rare in tort law cases. Relatively uniquely for a common law jurisdiction, Singapore's Community Disputes Resolution Act 2015 (CDRA) alters the common law by codifying a statutory tort of "interference with enjoyment or use of place of residence" and provides for a variety of remedies beyond damages, ranging from injunctions and specific performance to court-ordered apologies. Where a court order providing for a remedy other than damages is awarded under the CDRA is violated, sections 5-8 of the act require that the plaintiff apply for a 'special direction' to be issued in order to enforce the original remedy and section 9 provides that failure to comply with a special direction is grounds for the court to issue an order excluding the tortfeasor from their residence. Aside from legislatively created remedies such as the CDRA, courts in common law jurisdictions will typically provide for damages (which, depending on jurisdiction, may include punitive damages), but judges will issue injunctions and specific performance where they deem damages not to be a sufficient remedy. Legislatures in various common law jurisdictions have curtailed the ability of judges to award punitive or other non-economic damages through the use of non-economic damages caps and other tort reform measures.

Apart from proof that there was no breach of duty (in other words, that a tortious act was not committed in the first place), there are three principal defences to tortious liability in common law jurisdictions:

- Consent and warning: Typically, a victim cannot hold another liable if the victim has implicitly or explicitly consented to engage in a risky activity. This is frequently summarised by the maxim "volenti non fit injuria" (Latin: "to a willing person, no injury is done" or "no injury is done to a person who consents"). In many cases, those engaging in risky activities will be asked to sign a waiver releasing another party from liability. For example, spectators to certain sports are assumed to accept a risk of injury, such as a hockey puck or baseball striking a member of the audience. Warnings by the defendant may also provide a defence depending upon the jurisdiction and circumstances. This issue arises, for example, in the duty of care that landowners have for guests or trespasses, known as occupiers' liability.
- Comparative or contributory negligence: If the victim has contributed to causing their own harm through negligent or irresponsible actions, the damages may be reduced or eliminated.
  - Contributory negligence: The English case Butterfield v. Forrester (1809) established this defence. In England, this "contributory negligence" became a partial defence, but in the United States, any fault by the victim eliminated any damages. This meant that if the plaintiff was 1% at fault, the victim would lose the entire lawsuit. This was viewed as unnecessarily harsh and therefore amended to a comparative negligence system in many states; as of 2007 contributory negligence exists in only a few states such as North Carolina and Maryland.
  - Comparative negligence: In comparative negligence, the victim's damages are reduced according to the degree of fault. Comparative negligence has been criticised as allowing a plaintiff who is recklessly 95% negligent to recover 5% of the damages from the defendant. Economists have further criticised comparative negligence as not encouraging precaution under the calculus of negligence. In response, many states now have a 50% rule where the plaintiff recovers nothing if the plaintiff is more than 50% responsible.
- Illegality: If the claimant is involved in wrongdoing at the time the alleged negligence occurred, this may extinguish or reduce the defendant's liability. The legal maxim ex turpi causa non oritur actio, Latin for "no right of action arises from a despicable cause". Thus, if a burglar is verbally challenged by the property owner and sustains injury when jumping from a second story window to escape apprehension, there is no cause of action against the property owner even though that injury would not have been sustained but for the property owner's intervention.
- Other defences and immunities:
  - Sovereign immunity
  - Good Samaritan laws, especially in jurisdictions with a statutory or common law duty to rescue
  - Charitable immunity

=== Discovery in tort litigation ===
Discovery (or disclosure), a concept unique to common law jurisdictions, is a pre-trial procedure in a lawsuit in which each party, through the law of civil procedure, can open-endedly demand evidence from the other party or parties by means of discovery devices such as interrogatories, requests for production of documents, requests for admissions and depositions. Discovery can be obtained from non-parties using subpoenas. When a discovery request is objected to, the requesting party may seek the assistance of the court by filing a motion to compel discovery. In tort litigation, the availability of discovery enables plaintiffs to essentially carry out a private investigation, subpoenaing records and documents from the defendant. Consequently, commentators in civil law jurisdictions regard discovery destructive of the rule of law and as "a private inquisition." Civil law countries see the underlying objectives of discovery as properly monopolised by the state in order to maintain the rule of law: the investigative objective of discovery is the prerogative of the executive branch, and insofar as discovery may be able to facilitate the creation of new rights, that is the prerogative of the legislative branch. The availability of discovery in common law jurisdictions means that plaintiffs who, in other jurisdictions, would not have sufficient evidence upon which to file a tort claim are able to do so in the hope that they will be able to obtain sufficient evidence through discovery. The primary drawbacks of this are that, on one hand, it creates the possibility that a plaintiff filing suit in good faith may not find enough evidence to succeed and incur legal expenses driven upward due to the cost of discovery; and, on the other hand, that it enables plaintiffs arguing in bad faith to initiate frivolous tort lawsuits and coerce defendants into agreeing to legal settlements in otherwise unmeritorious actions.

=== Variation between common law jurisdictions ===
Among common law countries today, there are significant differences in tort law. Common law systems include United States tort law, Australian tort law, Canadian tort law, Indian tort law, and the tort law of a variety of jurisdictions in Asia and Africa. There is a more apparent split in tort law between the Commonwealth countries and the United States. Despite diverging from English common law in 1776, earlier than the other common law jurisdictions, United States tort law was influenced by English law and Blackstone's Commentaries, with several state constitutions specifically providing for redress for torts in addition to reception statutes which adopted English law. However, tort law globally was viewed as relatively undeveloped by the mid-19th century; the first American treatise on torts was published in the 1860s but the subject became particularly established when Oliver Wendell Holmes, Jr wrote on the subject in the 1880s. Holmes' writings have been described as the "first serious attempt in the common law world to give torts both a coherent structure and a distinctive substantive domain", although Holmes' summary of the history of torts has been critically reviewed. The 1928 US case of Palsgraf v. Long Island Railroad Co. heavily influenced the British judges in the 1932 House of Lords case of Donoghue v Stevenson. The United States has since been perceived as particularly prone to filing tort lawsuits even relative to other common law countries, although this perception has been criticised and debated. 20th century academics have identified that class actions were relatively uncommon outside of the United States, noting that the English law was less generous to the plaintiff in the following ways: contingent fee arrangements were restricted, English judges tried more decisions and set damages rather than juries, wrongful death lawsuits were relatively restricted, punitive damages were relatively unavailable, the collateral source rule was restricted, and strict liability, such as for product liability, was relatively unavailable. The English welfare state, which provides free healthcare to victims of injury, may explain the lower tendency towards personal injury lawsuits in England. A similar observation has also been made with regard to Australia.

While Indian tort law is generally derived from English law, there are certain differences between the two systems. Indian tort law uniquely includes remedies for constitutional torts, which are actions by the government that infringe upon rights enshrined in the Constitution, as well as a system of absolute liability for businesses engaged in hazardous activity as outlined in the rule in M. C. Mehta v. Union of India. Similar to other common law jurisdictions, conduct which gives rise to a cause of action under tort law is additionally criminalised by the Indian Penal Code, which was originally enacted in 1860. As a result of the influence of its relatively early codification of criminal law, the torts of assault, battery, and false imprisonment are interpreted by Indian courts and the courts of jurisdictions that were formerly part of the British Indian Empire (e.g. Pakistan, Bangladesh) and British colonies in South East Asia which adopted the Indian Penal Code (i.e. Singapore, Malaysia, and Brunei) with reference to analogous crimes outlined in the code. For instance, assault is interpreted in the context of s.351 per which the following criteria constitute assault:

- Making of any gesture or preparation by a person in the presence of another.
- Intention or knowledge of likelihood that such gesture or preparation will cause the person present to apprehend that the person making it is about to use criminal force on them.

Similarly, battery is interpreted in the context of criminal force as outlined in s.350. (Note: "Whoever intentionally uses force to any person, without that person's consent in order to the committing of any offence or intending by the use of such force he will cause injury, fear, or annoyance to the person to whom the force is used is said to use criminal force to that other".)

An area of tort unique to India is the constitutional tort, a public law remedy for violations of rights, generally by agents of the state, and is implicitly premised on the strict liability principle. In practice, constitutional torts in India serve the role served by administrative courts in many civil law jurisdictions and much of the function of constitutional review in other jurisdictions, thereby functioning as a branch of administrative law rather than private law. Rather than developing principles of administrative fairness as a distinct branch of law as other common law jurisdictions have, Indian courts have thus extended tort law as it applies between private parties to address unlawful administrative and legislative action.

Within Canada's common law provinces, there is currently no consistent approach to the tort of invasion of privacy. Four provinces (British Columbia, Manitoba, Newfoundland and Saskatchewan) have created a statutory tort. Ontario has recognised the existence of the tort of "intrusion upon seclusion", which has also been held to exist under tort law in the United States. British Columbia, on the other hand, has held that the tort does not exist in that province under the common law. Like the United Kingdom and British Columbia, but unlike Ontario and most jurisdictions in the United States, Indian tort law does not traditionally recognise a common law tort of invasion of privacy or intrusion on seclusion. Nevertheless, there is a shift in jurisprudence toward recognising breech of confidentiality as an actionable civil wrong. Proponents of protection for privacy under Indian tort law argue that "the right to privacy is implicit" in Article 21 of the Constitution of India, which guarantees protections for personal liberties. Despite the lack of a tort addressing violations of privacy by private individuals, the Supreme Court recognised privacy as a constitutional right in 2017. Similarly, neither intentional infliction of emotional distress (IIED) nor negligent infliction of emotional distress (NIED) is recognised as a tort in Indian jurisprudence. While claims seeking damages for infliction of emotional distress were historically an accessory claim in a tort action alleging another distinct tort, the doctrine has evolved in North America into a stand-alone tort while English jurisprudence has evolved to typically recognise only recognised psychiatric injuries as grounds for compensation. Indian courts, while recognising the infliction of emotional distress regardless of intention as an actionable wrong in matrimonial disputes, typically follow the English approach, although case law from both the United Kingdom and North America is frequently employed by judges ruling on cases in which damages for mental distress are sought.

== Scots and Roman-Dutch law ==
Both Scots and Roman-Dutch law are uncodified, scholarship-driven, and judge-made legal systems based on Roman law as historically applied in the Netherlands and Scotland during the Enlightenment. In both legal systems, when applied in English speaking countries, the term delict is used to refer to tortious liability (unlike, for instance, in Spain where the cognate of the term delict refers to a criminal offence). Unlike in systems based on civil codes or on the English common law, Scots and Roman-Dutch law operate on broad principles of liability for wrongdoing; there is no exhaustive list of named delicts in either system; if the conduct complained of appears to be wrongful, the law will afford a remedy even in the absence of precedent pertaining to similar conduct. In South Africa and neighbouring countries, the Roman-Dutch law of delict is in force, having been preserved after the United Kingdom annexed Dutch settlements in South Africa and spread as neighbouring British colonies adopted South African law via reception statutes. Roman-Dutch law also forms the basis for the legal system of Sri Lanka.

=== Elements of delict ===
The elements of a delict as follows: The elements of harm and conduct are fact-based inquiries, while causation is part-factual and part-normative, and wrongfulness and fault are entirely normative: that is, value-based, in that they articulate a wider societal policy perspective. Delict is "inherently a flexible set of principles that embody social policy."

1. harm sustained by the plaintiff; (Note: The harm element is 'the cornerstone of the law of delict, and our fundamental point of departure'. Once the nature of the harm is identified, it is possible to identify the nature of the enquiry and the elements that need to be proven. There is an interplay between the elements of harm and wrongfulness, and a similar interaction between the way in which we determine harm and assess damages. 'For conceptual clarity', suggest the academic authorities, 'it is always important to remember where we are going along the problem-solving route towards the intended destination'.)
2. conduct on the part of the defendant which is wrongful; (Note: It is vitally important that the conduct be voluntary. There must be no compulsion, in other words, and it must not be a reflex action. (The person engaging in the conduct must also be compos mentis or in sound mind and of sober senses, not unconscious or intoxicated, for example. He must be accountable for his actions, having the ability to distinguish between right and wrong, and to act accordingly. Unless this standard of accountability is secured, he will not be accountable for his actions or omissions. There will be no fault.) Conduct relates to overt behaviour, so that thoughts, for example, are not delictual. If it is a positive act or commission, it may be either physical or a statement or comment; if an omission—that is, a failure to do or say something—liability arises only in special circumstances. There is no general legal duty to prevent harm.)
3. a causal connection between the conduct and the plaintiff's harm; and
4. fault or blameworthiness (Note: Fault or blameworthiness can encompass both intentionality and negligence) on the part of the defendant.

=== Remedies ===
Under the Scots and Roman-Dutch law of delict, there are two main remedies available to plaintiffs:

- the actio legis Aquiliae, or Aquilian action, which relates to patrimonial loss (i.e. economic damages);
- the actio iniuriarum, which relates to injuries to non-patrimonial loss (i.e. non-economic damages);

Protected interests which can give rise to delictual liability can be broadly divided into two categories: patrimonial and non-patrimonial interests. Patrimonial interests are those which pertain to damages to an individual's body or property, which both Scots and Roman-Dutch law approach in the context of the Roman Lex Aquilia. Non-patrimonial interests include dignitary and personality related interests (e.g. defamation, disfigurement, unjust imprisonment) which cannot be exhaustively listed which are addressed in the context of the Roman Actio iniuriarum, as well as pain and suffering which are addressed under jurisprudence that has developed in modern times. In general; where an individual violates a patrimonial interest, they will incur Aquilian liability; and, where an individual violates a non-patrimonial interest, they will incur liability stemming from the actio iniuriarum. While broadly similar due to their common origin, the nature of the remedies available under contemporary Scots and Roman-Dutch law vary slightly, although the aquilian action and actio iniuriarum are the primary remedies available under both systems. The primary difference between the two remedies is that the aquilian action serves a compensatory function (i.e. providing economic damages to restore the plaintiff to their previous state) while the actio iniuriarum provides for non-economic damages aimed at providing solace to the plaintiff. In Roman-Dutch law (but not in Scots law), there is also a distinct action for pain and suffering relating to pain and suffering and psychiatric injury, which provides for non-economic damages similar to those under the actio iniuriarum. The various delictual actions are not mutually exclusive. It is possible for a person to suffer various forms of harm at the same time, which means that a person may simultaneously claim remedies under more than one action.

The elements of liability under the actio iniuriarum are as follows:

- harm, in the form of a violation of a non-patrimonial interest (one's corpus, (Note: Infringements of a person's corpus include assaults, acts of a sexual or indecent nature, and 'wrongful arrest and detention'.) dignitas (Note: Dignitas is a generic term meaning 'worthiness, dignity, self-respect', and comprises related concerns like mental tranquillity and privacy. Because it is such a wide concept, its infringement must be serious. Not every insult is humiliating; one must prove contumelia. This includes insult (iniuria in the narrow sense), adultery, loss of consortium, alienation of affection, breach of promise (but only in a humiliating or degrading manner), violation of chastity and femininity (as in the cases of peeping toms, sexual suggestions in letters, indecent exposure, seduction, wrongful dismissal of an employee in humiliating terms and unwarranted discrimination on grounds of sex, colour or creed).) and fama (Note: Infringement of fama is the impairment of reputation, better known as defamation.));
- wrongful conduct; and
- intention.

There are five essential elements for liability in terms of the actio legis Aquiliae:

1. The harm must take the form of patrimonial loss.
2. The conduct must take the form of a positive act or an omission or statement.
3. The conduct must be wrongful: that is to say, objectively unreasonable and without lawful justification.
4. One must be at fault, and one's blameworthiness must take the form of dolus (intention) or culpa (negligence). One must, however, be accountable for one's conduct before one can be blameworthy.
5. There must be causation both factual and legal. For the former, the conduct must have been a sine qua non of the loss; for the latter, the link must not be too tenuous.

In Scots law, the aquilian action has developed more expansively and may be invoked as a remedy for both patrimonial and certain types of non-patrimonial loss, particularly with regard to personal injury. By way of a legal fiction, 'personal injury' is treated as (physical) 'damage done', with the net effect that 'the actio injuriarum root of Scots law infuses the [nominate] delict assault as much as any development of the lex Aquilia' and wrongdoing that results in physical harm to a person may give rise to both an aquilian action and an actio iniuriarum. Additionally, the modern Scots law pertaining to reparation for negligent wrongdoing is based on the lex Aquilia and so affords reparation in instances of damnum injuria datum - literally loss wrongfully caused - with the wrongdoing in such instances generated by the defender's culpa (i.e., fault). In any instance in which a pursuer (A) has suffered loss at the hands of the wrongful conduct of the defender (B), B is under a legal obligation to make reparation. If B's wrongdoing were intentional in the circumstances, or so reckless that an 'intention' may be constructively inferred (on the basis that culpa lata dolo aequiparatur - 'gross fault is the same as intentional wrongdoing'), then it follows axiomatically that B will be liable to repair any damage done to A's property, person or economic interest: 'wherever a defender intentionally harms the pursuer - provided the interest harmed is regarded as reparable - the defender incurs delictual liability'. If the pursuer has suffered loss as the result of the defender's conduct, yet the defender did not intend to harm the pursuer, nor behave so recklessly that intent might be constructively inferred, the pursuer must demonstrate that the defender's conduct was negligent in order to win their case. Negligence can be established, by the pursuer, by demonstrating that the defender owed to them a 'duty of care' which they ultimately breached by failing to live up to the expected standard of care. If this can be shown, then the pursuer must also establish that the defender's failure to live up to the expected standard of care ultimately caused the loss (damnum) complained of.

=== Defences ===
There is a distinction between defences aimed at the wrongfulness element and defences which serve to exclude fault. Grounds of justification may be described as circumstances which occur typically or regularly in practice, and which indicate conclusively that interference with a person's legally protected interests is reasonable and therefore lawful. They are practical examples of circumstances justifying a prima facie infringement of a recognised right or interest, according to the fundamental criterion of reasonableness. They are another expression of the legal convictions of the society.

Consent to injury, or Volenti non fit injuria, is a full defence; if successful, there is no delict. As a general defence, it can take two forms:

1. consent to a specific harmful act of the defendant; and
2. assumption of the risk of harm connected with the activity of the defendant.

There are five requirements for the defence of consent:

1. capacity;
2. knowledge and appreciation of harm; and
3. consent, or free and voluntary assumption of risk. In addition,
4. the consent must not have been socially undesirable—not seduction, or murder for insurance purposes; and
5. the consent must not have been revoked.

Necessity is conduct directed at an innocent person as a result of duress or compulsion, or a threat by a third party or an outside force. Private defence (or self-defence) is conduct directed at the person responsible for the duress or compulsion or threat. There is, therefore, an important distinction between the two. In cases of necessity and private defence, the question is this: Under which circumstances would the legal convictions of the community consider it reasonable to inflict harm to prevent it? The test is objective. It requires a balancing of the parties' and of society's interests. The role of the person against whom the defensive conduct is directed is an important factor in determining whether defence or necessity is being pled. An act of necessity is calculated to avert harm by inflicting it on an innocent person, whereas an act of defence is always directed at a wrongdoer. A person acts in "private defence", and therefore lawfully, when he uses force to ward off an unlawful attack against his or someone else's property or person. A person acts in "self-defence" when he defends his own body against unlawful attack by someone else. One therefore cannot invoke the justification of self-defence when acting in the interests of another person, but it is possible to invoke the justification of private defence when acting in one's own interests. Conduct will be justified as an act in private defence or self-defence if it is

- lawful;
- directed against a wrongdoer; and
- for the protection of the actor's or a third party's interest, which is threatened or attacked by the wrongdoer.

The violence used in defence must not exceed what is reasonably necessary to avert the threatened danger:

- The attack must have constituted a real or imminent infringement of the defendant's rights.
- The attack must have been unlawful.
- The defensive conduct must have been directed at the attacker.
- The defence must have been necessary to protect the threatened interests.
- It must have been reasonable: An act of defence is justified only if it was reasonably necessary for the purpose of protecting the threatened or infringed interest.

An act of necessity may be described as lawful conduct directed against an innocent person for the purpose of protecting an interest of the actor or of a third party (including the innocent person) against a dangerous situation, which may have arisen owing to the wrongful conduct of another or the behaviour of an animal, or through natural forces. Two types of emergency situations may be found:

1. those caused by humans; and
2. those caused by natural forces.

== Other jurisdictions ==
=== China ===
==== History ====
Civil and criminal law were not clearly delineated in Ancient Chinese law as they are in modern legal systems. Therefore, while Tort Law was not a distinct area of law, concepts familiar to tort law were present in the criminal laws. However, by the late feudalism period, personal injury and property damage torts were mostly focused on compensation.

The earliest "tort case" known from Ancient China is from the Zhou dynasty. During a famine one person robbed another's barn by sending his slave to steal the grain. He was sued and the court ordered double the original grain restored to the victim to compensate the damages. The Qin Code made some changes to tort liabilities introducing the concept of subjective fault (fault liability). In a case where one person borrows farm equipment, compensation would be required for damage to the equipment if the damage is caused by the condition of the equipment when it was borrowed. In addition to fault liability, some defences were developed. A person would not be liable if public property were damaged by fire or other natural forces outside the person's control. There was no liability for killing livestock, if the livestock was about to hurt someone.

In contemporary China, however, there are four distinct legal systems in force, none of which are derived from classical Chinese law: Portuguese civil law in Macau, common law in Hong Kong, a German-style civil law system adopted by the Republic of China following Japan's model, and a primarily civil law system in the mainland.

==== Republic of China ====
In areas administered by the Republic of China, (Note: The area under the definition consists of: Taiwan (Chinese: 台灣); Penghu (Chinese: 澎湖); Kinmen (Chinese: 金門; pinyin: Jīnmén); Matsu Islands (Chinese: 馬祖列島; pinyin: Mǎzǔ Lièdǎo); Other nearby islands) the legislative basis of tort law is the Civil Code of the Republic of China whose legal system was modelled after the Japanese Six Codes system, which itself was primarily based on the German pandectist approach to law. In general, article 184 provides that a person who "intentionally or negligently" damages another person's rights is required to compensate them for any resulting injury, and provides for strict liability where such harm is caused by the violation of a statutory provision aimed at protecting members of the community from harm. Additionally, tort liability exists for the owner of a defective building or structure where such building or structure causes damage, for the driver of an automobile that causes injury, and for individual's responsible for business activities that posed a risk of harm to the plaintiff. Tort liability in the Republic of China also extends to the violation of certain non-pecuniary interests under article 195 which provides for reasonable compensation in the case of damage to the body, health, reputation, liberty, credit, privacy, or chastity of another, or to another's personality in a severe way. (Note: A similar cause of action exists under article 193 for plaintiffs to seek compensation for lost capacity to work)

==== Mainland China ====
In 2021, the mainland adopted the Civil Code of the People's Republic of China (CCPRC), Book Seven of which is titled "Tort Liability" and codifies a variety of torts, providing that an individual "who through his fault infringes upon another person's civil-law rights and interests shall bear tort liability". Book Seven outlines seven distinct categories of torts:

- Product Liability (Chapter IV)
- Liability for Motor Vehicle Traffic Accidents (Chapter V)
- Liability for Medical Malpractice (Chapter VI)
- Liability for Environmental Pollution and Ecological Damage (Chapter VII, comparable to toxic torts in common law jurisdictions)
- Liability for Ultra-hazardous Activities (Chapter VIII, essentially codifying the common law doctrine of the same name)
- Liability for Damage Caused by Domesticated Animals (Chapter IX)
- Liability for Damage Caused by Buildings and Objects (Chapter X)

While Book Seven (titled "Tort Liability") of the CCPRC, which is influenced by a variety of common law and civil law jurisdictions, codifies the torts which exist under the law of Mainland China, Book One of the CCPRC provides a comprehensive list of remedies for torts in Article 179:

(1) cessation of the infringement;
(2) removal of the nuisance;
(3) elimination of the danger;
(4) restitution;
(5) restoration;
(6) repair, redoing or replacement;
(7) continuance of performance;
(8) compensation for losses;
(9) payment of liquidated damages;
(10) elimination of adverse effects and rehabilitation of reputation; and
(11) extension of apologies.

These remedies apply to all categories of torts outlined in Book Seven or by any other provision of law. To this end, Book Seven specifically provides that "where a tortious act endangers another person's personal or property safety, the infringed person has the right to request the tortfeasor to bear tort liability such as cessation of the infringement, removal of the nuisance, or elimination of the danger". Book One additionally provides that force majeure (Note: Defined in Article 180 as "objective conditions which are unforeseeable, unavoidable, and insurmountable") constitutes a valid defence for tort liability while Article 184 in that book is a Good Samaritan law eliminating liability under tort law for individuals acting to save or rescue a potential plaintiff. Article 1176 in Book Seven provides a partial defence where an injury is caused in the course of a sport in which the plaintiff was consensually participating.

=== France ===
Tort liability in France (responsabilité extracontractuelle) is a distinct system which has developed over the course of history stemming from the Napoleonic Code which, together with the German Bürgerliches Gesetzbuch, forms the basis for private law in the majority of civil law countries with civil codes. French tort law is based on the principle that all injuries and other wrongs give rise to a remedy, typically in the form of damages, regardless of any other moral or equitable considerations; nevertheless, there are limits on the types of injuries which give rise to a remedy as well as the extent to which damages may be claimed. French jurisprudence has established that, in order to attract a remedy, an injury should generally be certain and direct (prohibiting speculative damages or compensation for pure economic loss) and affect a legitimate interest; however, judges do not recognise a hard and fast rule, meaning that great weight is given to the specific circumstances in each case with precedent serving to guide rather than control jurisprudence. The main principle in French tort law is that of fault, the principle that the individual who causes damage ought generally to be liable for it; however, following the Industrial Revolution, vicarious liability and strict liability have developed through both precedent and legislative action in response to the need to address damage caused by products, machines, and the actions of agents or employees.

French tort law is primarily governed by articles 1240 to 1245-17 of the civil code, which establish a number of distinct regimes for tort liability. Liability for one's own actions is governed by articles 1240 and 1241, while other provisions of the code provide for vicarious and other sui generis forms of liability. In addition, liability in specific cases (e.g. product liability and defamation) have been provided for in separate statutes outside the code and in European Union directives.

=== Germany ===
==== Outline ====
German tort law is codified in Book 2 of the Bürgerliches Gesetzbuch (BGB), which provides for damages in circumstances in which there is no contractual relationship between the plaintiff and the defendant. German tort law protects plaintiffs against violations of:

- Legal interests (German: Rechtsgut, literally: "legal good"): A legal interest is a good or interest protected by the legal system. Legal interests protected by tort are in particular life, the body, health, freedom and property. The type and number of protected legal interests are not conclusively defined and, where multiple such interests are at odds, they must be weighed against each other (e.g. human dignity versus freedom of speech in the context of the tort of defamation).
- Absolute rights (German: Absolutes Recht): Absolute rights provide a beneficiary with an exclusive, legally protected right to over a specific legal position (e.g. property rights), which everyone must respect.
- Protective laws (German: Schutzgesetz): In essence, a protective law is a provision of a written law which the Bundestag or a Landtag intended to protect individuals from some category of harm (e.g. a product liability or consumer protection law).

There are three distinct categories of liability recognised under the BGB: liability for "culpable injustice", "injustice in rebuttable presumed liability", and strict liability arising from "endangerment". Liability for culpable injustice, the default position in German tort law, is where an individual directly violates another person's legal interest or absolute right either intentionally or negligently. Rebuttable presumed liability is the principle that an individual is vicariously liable where a legal interest or absolute right is violated by another person (e.g. an agent, child/other person in their custody), where such a violation is committed by an animal, or where such a violation takes place on the first individual's property. Strict liability for endangerment exists with regard to violations of protective laws (e.g. product liability, environmental laws, motor vehicle regulations) and in cases in which an individual is especially vulnerable due to the nature of a circumstance (e.g. medical or legal malpractice).

The BGB makes specific provisions for several different categories of torts pertaining to damages available, including damages and injunctions to prevent the commission of a tortious act. These provisions are supplemented by specific legislation, particularly protective laws. With regard to product liability, protective laws implementing European Union directives provide for a system of strict liability similar to that adopted in many common law jurisdictions; however, German tort law does not recognise class action lawsuits or the notion of mass torts. German tort law additionally does not permit punitive damages.

==== Jurisprudence ====
In terms of tort liability, the BGB represents a school of legal jurisprudence – the pandectists – heavily shaped by 19th century classical liberalism and, accordingly, places great emphasis on minimising impairment to individual freedom of action. In this regard, it can be contrasted with the Napoleonic Code, which was authored a century earlier and placed greater emphasis on the protection of individuals from the actions of others. As the two codes form the basis for private law in a variety of jurisdictions across the world, with one or the other being substantially copied by most civil law jurisdictions on every continent, the differences underpinning the BGB and the Napoleonic Code represent a major schism in jurisprudence between civil law jurisdictions. Since 1900, both the judges and German legislators decisively rejected the idea of a general principle of civil liability commonly found in civil codes inspired by the Napoleonic Code as well as in those of Japan and the Republic of China which are otherwise based primarily on the same pandectist school as the BGB and that of the Philippines.

One distinguishing feature of German law is the extent to which liability depends not just on the damage caused but on the action of the purported tortfeasor. Sometimes it is enough to prove negligence, while in other cases a more serious fault is required. Thus, anyone who unlawfully interferes, intentionally or through recklessness, with the life, body, health, freedom or property of others is liable to others to repair the resulting damage. On the other hand, less protection is granted in the event of damage to purely intangible interests, nicht-gegenständliche Interessen, that is to say when the victim only suffers purely economic or moral damage. Such is the case of a pecuniary loss caused by erroneous information or vexatious remarks. Apart from a rather marginal hypothesis provided for by article § 823 paragraph 2(9), the recourse will then suppose an intentional fault. The protection thus granted has proven to be incomplete. Consequently, over the course of the 20th century, case law has extended liability for recklessness to other cases, in particular by admitting that § 823 paragraph 1 BGB aims to protect a "general right to personality" and a "right to the company" or by recognising, alongside tort liability, the theory of culpa in contrahendo. Although Boris Starck makes no express reference to it, there are serious reasons to think that this right strongly inspired him in his elaboration of the theory of the guarantee. First, it takes up the idea of considering the event giving rise to the right to compensation, starting from the nature of the interest affected. Moreover, there is an astonishing resemblance between the respective formulations: § 823 paragraph 1 BGB is supposed to protect the integrity of property and persons by granting protection "to life, body, health, freedom, to property". Starck, for his part, claims "a right to life, to bodily integrity and to the material integrity of the objects belonging to us". Finally, on both sides, it is with the same arguments, such as the need to protect the freedom to act, that a less intense protection of purely economic and moral interests is justified. Nevertheless, Boris Starck departs from the German model by raising the protection of physical integrity by a notch, believing that the only breach here generates a right to compensation.

=== Israel ===
Israeli tort law is codified in the Tort Ordinance, originally passed under British rule, and is largely based on common law principles with influences from civil law jurisdictions. The Jewish law of rabbinic damages in Israel is another example of tort, although the Tort Ordinance is far more relevant in secular life, having been enacted by British Mandate of Palestine authorities in 1944 and taking effect in 1947. The Tort Ordinance additionally provides that any civil court may grant either or both compensation or an injunction as a remedy for a tort and codifies common law rules regarding liability and defences to tort claims. Chapter Three of the ordinance provides a list of torts recognised under Israeli law, including:

- Assault (article one): Assault is defined as the "intentional application of any kind of force" (Note: "by way of striking, touching, moving or otherwise, to the body of a person") either without their consent or by obtaining consent through fraud. It also includes "any attempt" to do so if the plaintiff reasonably feared injury. The act provides that self defence, the use of reasonable force to protect property or executing a lawful warrant constitute valid defences to the tort of assault. Additional defences apply where both the plaintiff and the defendant are members of the Israeli Defence Forces or where the plaintiff suffered from a mental illness.
- False imprisonment (article two): False imprisonment is defined as "the deprivation of the liberty of any person, unlawfully and absolutely, for any period of time by physical means or by a show of authority."
- Trespass to moveable and immovable property (article three): Any unlawful interference with the plaintiff's immovable or moveable property
- Negligence (article four): The act provides that an individual is liable where they violate a duty of care owed to members of the general public.
- "Damage caused by dog" (article four A), nuisance (article five): The owner of a dog is vicariously liable for tortious conduct on the part of the dog.
- Misappropriation of property (article six): This tort provides a remedy for the unlawful detention of property and for conversion.
- Deceit (article seven): This tort provides a remedy for fraud and injurious falsities
- Malicious prosecution (article eight)
- Causing breach of contract (article nine),
- Breach of statutory duty (article ten).

=== Japan ===
Like the French Civil Code, the Japanese Civil Code only has a single provision on tort liability. Article 709 of the Civil Code states: "A person who has intentionally or negligently infringed any right of others, or legally protected interest of others, shall be liable to compensate any damages resulting in consequence." Tort liability in Japan therefore exists when three conditions are met: negligence or intentionality on the part of the tortfeasor, infringement of some legally recognised right, and a causal link between the tortfeasor's action and the infringement in question. As this leaves room for a broad and potentially unrestricted scope of tort liability, Japanese tort law gradually developed based on case law, including cases on pollution. Statutes outside the Civil Code also regulate specific types of torts, such as the Law on the Compensation of Losses arising from Car Accidents enacted in 1955, the 1973 Law on the Remedies of Harm Caused to Human Health by Pollution, and the 1994 Law on Product Liability. The standard of proof in Japanese tort litigation is that of "proof of a high degree of probability", a higher standard than the balance of probabilities utilised for tort liability in common law jurisdictions but lower than the reasonable doubt standard used in most legal systems for criminal trials, which the Japanese Supreme Court described in the leading case Miura v. Japan (a case on liability for medical malpractice):

Proving causation in litigation, unlike proving causation in the natural sciences (which permits no doubt at any point), requires proof of a high degree of probability that certain facts have induced the occurrence of a specific result by taking into necessary and sufficient account that the judge has been persuaded of the truthfulness to a degree where an average person would have no doubt.

Contemporary Japanese product liability law forms a distinct area of tort liability in which litigation may proceed under Article 709 of the Civil Code or the Product Liability Act of 1994. Under the Product Liability Act, which defines "products" as including any "movable item that is manufactured or processed"; manufacturers bear strict liability where a plaintiff proves the existence of:

- A defect in the product,
- Damage to life, body, or property, and
- A causal link between the defect and damage in question.

Under Japanese tort law, plaintiffs may seek compensation for both economic and non-economic damages, and there is no statutory cap on damages; however, punitive damages are forbidden on public policy grounds. Japanese courts regard the compensation of plaintiffs as the paramount purpose of damages under tort law, regarding punishment and deterrence as the exclusive domain of criminal law. Punitive damages awarded against tortfeasors by arbitral tribunals or foreign courts are unenforceable in Japan. Additionally, Japanese civil procedure does not allow for class actions and does not recognise mass tort liability.

As a result of the structure of Japan's tort system, the country experiences a significantly lower litigation rate than other jurisdictions. In a 1990 article, Takao Tanase posited that the structure of Japan's civil court system and its tort jurisprudence account for its low litigation rate, rather than any fundamental difference in culture between Japan and other countries. Indeed; present literature finds that, although Japanese jurists take a narrow view of tort law as solely serving to compensate plaintiffs for proven damages, the general Japanese public views punishment and deterrence as being just as desirable in civil litigation as the public in other countries. In Japan in 1986, fewer than 1% of automobile accidents involving death or an injury resulted in litigation, compared to 21.5% in the United States, a difference Tanase argues can be attributed to the availability of non-litigious methods of assessing fault, advising victims, determining compensation, and ensuring payment. Non-litigious dispute resolution mechanisms, mediation services, consultation centres operated by governments, the bar association, and insurance companies. The Japanese judiciary also works hard at developing clear, detailed rules that guarantee virtually automatic, predictable, moderate compensation for most accident victims. This contrasts with the tort system in common law jurisdictions, where the legal rules concerning both liability and general damages (i.e. non-economic loss) are stated in general terms, leaving a great deal to the judgment of constantly rotating lay juries—which in turn makes courtroom outcomes variable and difficult to predict. The result was a system that is vastly more efficient and reliable in delivering compensation than in common law jurisdictions, albeit without punitive or exemplary damages. Tanase estimated that legal fees comprised only 2% of the total compensation paid to injured persons. In the United States in the late 1980s, according to two big studies of motor vehicle accident tort claims (not just lawsuits), payments to lawyers equaled 47% of the total personal injury benefits paid by insurers. This expense drives up the cost of insurance to the point that huge numbers of drivers are uninsured or under-insured, which means that victims of their negligent driving will get little or nothing from the tort system.

=== New Zealand ===
In 2024, the New Zealand Supreme Court gave leave for Māori climate activist Mike Smith to sue seven corporations for their roles in causing climate change and the common law harms that resulted. Several aspects of Smith v Fonterra Co-operative Group Limited are notable. Smith argued that the principles of tikanga Māori — a traditional system of obligations and recognitions of wrong — can be used to inform New Zealand common law. Smith argued that the activities of the seven defendants — by directly emitting greenhouse gasses or supplying fossil fuels — fall under the established torts of public nuisance and negligence and a new tort of climate change damage. Smith further argued that these seven corporations are harming his tribe's land, coastal waters, and traditional culture. Smith belongs to the Northland tribes of Ngāpuhi and Ngāti Kahu. This judgment simply allows Smith to pursue these matters in the High Court. The defendants have indicated that they will seek to convince the court that climate change responses are better left to government policy and not subject to civil litigation.

=== North Korea ===
North Korea's approach to tort liability is relatively unique in the 21st century since, as a result of its Juche ideology and centralised planned economy, its legal system puts little emphasis on civil liability between private citizens; instead, it views correcting damages caused by tortious acts as the prerogative of the state through its economic intervention and criminal penalties. Nevertheless, the Law on the Compensation of Damages adopted on 22 August 2001 provides for tort liability, including vicarious liability on the part of principals for the actions of agents, employers for the actions of employees, parents or guardians for the actions of children, and owners for the actions of pets or other animals under their control. North Korean tort law also recognises capacity as an important factor in determining whether or not someone may be held liable for their own actions.

=== Philippines ===
The Philippines is a mixed law jurisdiction, shaped primarily by Spanish civil law and American common law as codified in the Philippine Civil Code. For the most part, the equivalent of tort law (insofar as it concerns negligence and product liability) in the Philippines is the law of quasi-delict. Article 2176 of the civil code provides that, in the absence of a contractual or quasi-contractual (Note: Under the Philippine civil code, there are three specific categories of obligation referred to as quasi-contractual and governed by special provisions of the civil code: Negotiorum gestio: Article 2144 provides that an individual (other than someone acting as an agent or under a contractual relationship) who takes on the management of another's affairs is obligated to continue to do so until directed otherwise or until such affairs are terminated and bears full liability for losses incurred.; Solutio indebiti: Article 2154 provides that an individual who receives something of value by accident must, under most circumstances, return it.; Other quasi contracts: Article 2164 provides that, where an individual provides support (e.g. financial support or medical assistance) without the knowledge of the recipient, the individual has a right to compensation except where it appears that the support was given "out of piety and without intention of being repaid".; Quasi-contracts are a distinct category of obligation more akin to a contract implied in law than to a quasi-delict/tort) relationship, a person who "by act or omission causes damage to another" by way of fault or negligence (Note: Article 1173 states that "The fault or negligence of the obligor consists in the omission of that diligence which is required by the nature of the obligation and corresponds with the circumstances of the persons, of the time and of the place.") is "obliged to pay for the damage done". Article 1174 (which is made applicable by article 2178) provides that an individual is generally exempt from liability if the events giving rise to the damage were unforeseeable or inevitable.

The Philippine law of quasi-delict is largely a codification of common law principles and doctrines. For instance, the common law doctrine of comparative negligence is codified in article 2179, providing for compensation to be reduced in proportion with the plaintiff's own fault for the damage they incurred. Similarly, the duty of care established in Donoghue v Stevenson is codified by article 2187 with regard to "manufacturers and processors of foodstuffs, drinks, toilet articles and similar goods", and is extended by article 2189 to provincial and local governments responsible for defective public amenities. Similarly, article 2190 establishes liability for the owners of defective buildings or structures that cause damage. Additionally, case law in the Philippines recognises the common law doctrine of res ipsa loquitur.

Outside the law of quasi-delicts, the civil code also codifies other provisions of tort law in Chapter 2 of the Preliminary Title under the heading "Human Relations". This chapter provides that "every person must, in the exercise of his rights and in the performance of his duties, act with justice, give everyone his due, and observe honesty and good faith" and that "every person who, contrary to law, wilfully or negligently causes damage to another, shall indemnify the latter for the same". While negligence and product liability are primarily covered by the law of quasi-delicts, this chapter covers intentional wrongs in article 21, which provides that "any person who wilfully causes loss or injury to another in manner that is contrary to morals, good customs or public policy shall compensate the latter for the damage". This chapter makes several other provisions in the realm of tortious liability, including: liability for defamation (article 33); violations of another person's privacy, causing humiliation on account of religion or economic status, causing another person to be alienated from their friends (article 26); benefitting from (without causing) damage to another person's property (article 23).

Damages under Philippine law are provided for in the Philippine Civil Code, which establishes harmonised rules for damages arising under any kind of obligation.In addition to pecuniary or economic damages, the code provides for two categories of non-economic damages with regard to quasi-delicts. Firstly, moral damages (i.e. damages for "physical suffering, mental anguish, fright, serious anxiety, besmirched reputation, wounded feelings, moral shock, social humiliation, and similar injury" resulting from a quasi-delict) may be awarded under article 2217. Secondly, exemplary damages may be awarded under article 2231 if there was "gross negligence" on the part of the defendant. In special cases, a court may choose to award nominal damages under article 2221 if it finds that, although it is unnecessary to compensate the plaintiff, it is nevertheless desirable to "vindicate" or "recognise" the violation of their right. Additionally, where a court cannot determine the value of damage incurred with sufficient certainty to award economic damages, it may instead award "temperate or moderate damages" under article 2224, which are higher than purely nominal damages but less than compensatory economic damages.

=== Québec ===
Private law in the Canadian province of Québec derives from the pre-Napoleonic French law then in force, but was eventually codified in the Civil Code of Lower Canada and later the present Code Civil du Québec (CCQ). While tort law in Canada's other provinces follows common law jurisprudence under which distinct nominate torts are recognised by precedent or statute, CCQ provides for a general and open-ended concept of "civil liability" or la responsabilité civile in article 1457:

Every person has a duty to abide by the rules of conduct incumbent on him, according to the circumstances, usage or law, so as not to cause injury to another. Where he is endowed with reason and fails in this duty, he is liable for any injury he causes to another by such fault and is bound to make reparation for the injury, whether it be bodily, moral or material in nature. He is also bound, in certain cases, to make reparation for injury caused to another by the act, omission or fault of another person or by the act of things in his custody.

The CCQ provides for and defines the scope of civil liability for damages caused by inanimate objects. Article 1465 makes the general provision that the custodian of a thing or object (bien) is liable for any damage caused by it, while article 1466 provides that the owner of an animal is liable for damage or injury caused by it even if it had escaped from their custody at the time of the incident. Similarly, article 1467 imposes liability for damages caused by the ruin of an immovable (i.e. a building or other fixed structure) upon its owner even if construction defects are the ultimate cause of the ruin. Strict liability is imposed upon the manufacturers of moveable things (i.e. product liability) by article 1468 for injuries caused by safety defects. (Note: Article 1469 provides that: "A thing has a safety defect where, having regard to all the circumstances, it does not afford the safety which a person is normally entitled to expect, particularly by reason of a defect in design or manufacture, poor preservation or presentation, or the lack of sufficient indications as to the risks and dangers it involves or as to the means to avoid them".) An individual is exempt from civil liability in cases of force majeure (article 1470), harm caused in the process of assisting or rescuing another (article 1471), and in certain other cases prescribed by law.

In general, there are four conditions necessary for a finding of civil liability under the CCQ:

- Imputability: The capacity of a tortfeasor to "discern right from wrong", and to understand the consequences of their actions.
- Fault: The failure of a tortfeasor to act as "a normally prudent and reasonable person" would have in similar circumstances.
- Damage: Harm or injury suffered by the plaintiff
- Causation: A causal link between the fault of the tortfeasor and the damage incurred by the plaintiff.

=== Switzerland ===
In Switzerland, liability (German: Haftpflicht; French: responsabilité civile) is the legal obligation to compensate damage caused to a third party, above all by an accident. The general part of tort law has been laid down in the Code of Obligations since 1881 and is supplemented by provisions in special acts. In private law, it concerns above all non-contractual damage; in public law, the liability of public bodies and their officials. Under strict liability (Kausalhaftung), compensation does not depend on personal fault.

In the second half of the 19th century, following the model of the German Imperial Liability Act of 1871, the emphasis was on railways and factories. The Federal Act on the Liability of Railways for Injuries introduced strict liability into Swiss law in 1875, and the Factory Act of 1877 likewise made employers strictly liable for accidents at work. The Factory Liability Act of 1881 restricted this liability, and an amendment of 1887 extended it to trades such as construction and haulage. Problems with enforcement led in 1918 to this liability being replaced by compulsory accident insurance. Because of growing technological risks, liability was then included in special acts, for example on electricity (1902), aviation (1920), road traffic (1932), pipelines (1963), water protection (1971), nuclear energy (1983), environmental protection (1983) and gene technology (2003), and in 1993 it was extended to product liability. Especially after the Second World War, the risk was increasingly shifted onto insurance. A complete revision of tort law, begun in 1988 to unify its legal basis and partly tighten liability, met strong criticism from business when the draft was sent out for consultation in 2000–2001. In 2009 the Federal Council abandoned it in favor of a partial revision that included extending the limitation period.

=== Thailand ===
Thai tort law, as with contemporary Thai law in general, is a codified admixture of principles derived from common law and civil law systems. Title V of the Civil and Commercial Code of Thailand (CCT) establishes the principles of Thai tort law, with section 420 enshrining the basic doctrine that:

A person who, willfully or negligently, unlawfully injures the life, body, health, liberty, property or any right of another person, is said to commit a wrongful act and is bound to make compensation therefore.

This is analogous to Article 709 of the Japanese Civil Code which establishes three criteria for tort liability: negligence or intentionality on the part of the tortfeasor, infringement of some legally recognised right (Note: The Thai provision expressly refers to violations of "life, body, health, liberty, property, or any right"; which differs from the Japanese provision only insofar as it explicitly establishes life, body, health, liberty, and property as protected interests. Nevertheless, the residual category of "any right" produces an open-ended scope of potential liability similar to that under the Japanese Civil Code) and a causal link between the tortfeasor's action and the infringement in question.

The CCT comprehensively outlines rules for tort liability and the burden of proof. In general, section 429 provides the default rule that everyone is liable for their own tortious acts and that the guardians of a child or other person lacking capacity are jointly liable. While the burden of proof under Thai tort law is on the plaintiff by default, section 422 of the CCT provides that an individual who infringes "a statutory provision intended for the protection of others" is presumed to be liable. Sections 425 through 327 provide for vicarious liability in employer-employee and principal-agent relationships while providing that an employer or principal found vicariously liable may seek compensation from the employee or agent, respectively. Similarly, section 433 provides that the owner or caretaker of an animal is liable for any tortious conduct it may commit, with the caveat that the owner or caretaker may seek compensation for such liability from anyone who "wrongfully excited or provoked the animal" or from "the owner of another animal" which did so. Sections 434 to 436 provide special rules for liability for the owners and possessors/occupiers (e.g. tenants/lessees) of defective buildings and structures, whereby: 1) the possessor is liable for damage caused by defective construction or poor maintenance except if they exercised proper care to prevent the damage, 2) if the possessor exercised proper care, the owner is liable, 3) the occupier of a building is liable for damage caused by items that fall from the building, and 4) an individual who is at risk of damage or injury from such a building may require its owner or possessor to take preventive action. Certain provisions of the CCT also provide for strict liability with regard to specific categories of tortious conduct; for example, section 437 provides for strict liability for an individual in charge of a vehicle or conveyance which causes injury and for individuals possessing items which are "dangerous by nature" or "on account of their mechanical action", except where the individual demonstrates that the injury resulted from force majeure. Additionally, the CCT provides that self-defence, the aversion of a common danger, (Note: A danger to the public or community) the use of reasonable and necessary force, and (where the thing or person damaged was the source of such danger) the aversion of an individual danger (Note: A danger to the defendant or a third person) are defences against tort claims.

The rules regarding compensation under Thai tort law are prescribed by the CCT. In general, section 438 provides that courts may award such compensation as appears necessary with regard to "the circumstances and gravity of the act"; and that, in addition to damages, "compensation may include restitution" of any property of which the plaintiff has been deprived or which has decreased in value as a result of the tortious act. Per section 439, an individual who defaults on an obligation to return property they had wrongly deprived another individual of is liable to compensate the other individual for "the accidental destruction" or "accidental impossibility of returning" the property in question, except where such destruction or impossibility would have occurred regardless of the wrongful deprivation. Section 440 provides that compensation may additionally include interest for lost time. Where the tortious act contributed to an individual's death, compensation must include funerary expenses; and, where the act resulted in damage to an individual's health or body, compensation must include reimbursement of medical expenses and lost wages, and may additionally include non-pecuniary damages. Where the tortious act involves harm to an individual's reputation, the court may order "proper measures to be taken" to restore the individual's reputation either together with or in lieu of damages.

=== European Union ===
The legal framework of the European Union consists of the treaties, regulations, directives and case law. Specifically in the area of tort law, a number of rules can be found in tort law directives. Examples of directives include the Product Liability Directive and the Directive on Unfair Commercial Practices. A directives can be either a maximum harmonisation directives, which means member states are not allowed to deviate from it, or a minimum harmonisation directive, which only provide a general framework. Article 288 of the TFEU, however, concedes that a directive 'shall be binding as to the result to be achieved, upon each member State to which it is addressed, but shall leave to national authorities the choice of form and methods'. Liability can also be based on the violation of community provisions. Article 288 of the TFEU explicitly regulates the liability of Community Institutions for damage caused by the breach of Union Law. This article does not give precise liability rules but refers to the general principles common to the laws of Member States. It does not mean that 'the Community judicature must search for a solution favoured by a majority of Member States .... It simply means that the Community judicature must look to the national systems for inspiration in devising a regime of non-contractual liability adapted to the specific circumstances of the Community.'

The development of a general principle of liability for breach of Union Law is also in the Francovich case law of the ECJ. In this 1991 decision, the ECJ acknowledged liability of the Member States towards individuals for violation of Union law as being inherent in the system of the Treaty and being necessary for the effectiveness of Community of law. On the basis of the general principles to which Article 288 refers, the ECJ developed three requirements for liability:

1. The rule of law infringed must be intended to confer rights on individuals
2. The breach must be sufficiently serious
3. There must be a direct causal link between the breach of the obligation resting on the State and the damage sustained by the injured parties.

The fulfilment of these requirements is sufficient for a right to compensation, which is directly based in Union Law.

Within the European Union and neighbouring countries, the European Group on Tort Law promotes the harmonisation of tort law within the region. The group meets regularly to discuss fundamental issues of tort law liability as well as recent developments and the future directions of the law of tort. The Group has founded the European Centre of Tort and Insurance Law in Vienna. The Group has drafted a collection of Principles of European Tort Law similar to the Principles of European Contract Law drafted by the European Contract Law Commission. The Principles of European Tort Law are a compilation of guidelines by the European Group on Tort Law aiming at the harmonisation of European tort law. They are not intended to serve as a model code, even though their wording may resemble statutory texts. At least with respect to form and structure, they resemble an American Restatement of the Law. The Principles of European Tort Law are intended to serve as a common framework for the further development of national tort laws and also of singular European legislation, which could avoid a further drifting-apart of piecemeal rule-making both on a national and on the European level.

== Conflict of laws ==
In certain instances, different jurisdictions' law may apply to a tort, in which case rules have developed for which law to apply. In common law jurisdictions, the traditional approach to determine which jurisdiction's tort law is applicable is the proper law test. When the jurisdiction is in dispute, one or more state laws will be relevant to the decision-making process. If the laws are the same, this will cause no problems, but if there are substantive differences, the choice of which law to apply will produce a different judgment. Each state, therefore, produces a set of rules to guide the choice of law, and one of the most significant rules is that the law to be applied in any given situation will be the proper law. This is the law which seems to have the closest and most real connection to the facts of the case, and so has the best claim to be applied. The general rule is that the proper law is the primary system of law that governs most aspects of the factual situation giving rise to the dispute. This does not imply that all the aspects of the factual circumstances are necessarily governed by the same system of law, but there is a strong presumption that this will be the case (see characterisation). Traditionally, common law jurisdictions such as England required "double actionability" for torts, effectively requiring the conduct to be considered tortious both in England and in the jurisdiction whose law is to apply under the proper law rule.

Over time, the proper law test has been refined or replaced in many common law jurisdictions either with reference to all instances of conflict of laws or specifically in the case of tort law. In English law, with the exception of defamation which continues to apply the proper law test, s10 Private International Law (Miscellaneous Provisions) Act 1995 abolishes the "double actionability" test, and s11 applies the lex loci delicti rule subject to an exception under s12 derived from Boys v Chaplin [1971] AC 356 and Red Sea Insurance Co Ltd v Bouygues SA [1995] 1 AC 190. Thus, it is no longer necessary for the case to be based on a tort actionable in England. The English courts must apply wider international tests and respect any remedies available under the "Applicable Law" or lex causae including any rules on who may claim (e.g. whether a personal representative may claim for a fatal accident) and who the relevant defendant may be (i.e. the English court would have to apply the applicable law's rules on vicarious liability or the identity of an "occupier" of land). The first step is for the court to decide where the tort occurred, which may be complicated if relevant events took place in more than one state. s11(2) distinguishes between:

- actions for personal injuries: it is the law of the place where the individual sustained the injury;
- damage to property: it is the law of the place where the property was damaged;
- in any other case, it is the law of the place in which the most significant element or elements occurred.

In exceptional circumstances, the lex loci delicti rule is displaced in favour of another law, if the "factors relating to the parties" or "any of the events which constitute the tort" show that this other law will be substantially more appropriate.

Within the European Union, there have been efforts to harmonise conflict of tort laws rules between member states. Under Article 3 of the proposed Rome II Regulation on the Law Applicable to Non-Contractual Obligations (22 July 2003), there would be a general presumption that the lex loci delicti will apply subject to either: an exception in Paragraph 2 for the application of the law to any common habitual residence between the parties, or an exception in Paragraph 3 for cases in which "the non-contractual obligation is manifestly more closely connected with another country. . ." the so-called proximity criterion. In effect, where other specific rules of the regulation are not applied, these general rules replicate the effect of the English rules outlined above. In product liability cases, Article 4 selects the law of the injured party's habitual residence if the product was marketed there with the consent of the defendant. The rationale is that if a defendant knows of, and is benefiting from, sales in the plaintiff's state, the choice of that state's law is reasonable. Article 6 specifies the lex fori for actions arising out of breach of privacy or defamation, a rule that may increase the risk of forum shopping. Whether the plaintiff has any right of reply in a defamation case will be determined under the law of the state where the broadcaster or publisher is established. In cases where contract and tort issues overlap, Article 9 states that the same law should govern both sets of issues, thus applying contractual choice of law clauses to related tort litigation.

In the United States, where each state constitutes a distinct jurisdiction for the purposes of tort law, different jurisdictions take different approaches to conflict of laws, and rules regarding conflict of tort laws apply equally to conflicts between the tort laws of two American states and conflicts between an American state and a foreign jurisdiction. Until the 20th century, traditional choice of law rules were based on the principle that legal rights vest automatically at legally significant and ascertainable times and places. For example, a dispute regarding property would be decided by the law of the place the property was located. Disputes in tort would be decided by the place where the injury occurred. During the first half of the 20th century, the traditional conflict of laws approach came under criticism from some members of the American legal community who saw it as rigid and arbitrary; the traditional method sometimes forced the application of the laws of a state with no connection to either party, except that a tort or contract claim arose between the parties in that state. This period of intellectual ferment (which coincided with the rise of the legal realism movement) introduced a number of innovative approaches to American choice of laws jurisprudence:

- Renvoi: Under this approach, courts look for a provision in the law of the choice of the law state that permits the court to use the lex fori, i.e. law of the forum state.
- Significant contacts test: This test evaluates the contacts between the states and each party to the case, and determines which state has the most significant contacts with the litigation as a whole.
- Seat of the relationship test: This test specifically examines the relationship between the parties to the lawsuit, and uses the law of the state in which the relationship between the parties was most significant.
- Balance of interests test: This test examines the interests of the states themselves, and the reasons for which the laws in question were passed. It is the brainchild of University of Chicago law professor Brainerd Currie, who outlined the doctrine in a series of articles from the 1950s and 60s. Under this form of analysis, the court must determine whether any conflict between the laws of the states is a true conflict, a false conflict, or an unprovided-for case. A true conflict occurs when one state offers a protection to a particular party that another state does not, and the court of the state that offers no such protection is asked to apply the law of the state offering the protection. In such a case, if the interests are balanced, the law of the forum will prevail. A false or apparent conflict occurs when the state offering the protection has no actual interest in the endorsement of that protection against the particular parties to the case. In this case, since neither party is from the forum state, it has no interest in the application of the law to these persons. An unprovided-for case is one in which each party is seeking to apply the law of the other state. In such a case, the law of the forum will prevail.
- Comparative impairment test: This test asks which state's policies would suffer more if their law was not applied. This is similar to interest analysis, in that the interests of the state are taken into account - however, this test does not look to see which state benefits more from the application of its laws, but rather for situations in which the other state's interests will actually be harmed by the application of the laws of the forum state.
- Better rule test: The better rule test presupposes that, between the laws presented by the two or more states in which the action arose, there is one set of laws that is empirically better, and which is therefore more meritorious of application by the forum court. Use of the "better rule" test, like renvoi, is frowned upon because it appears to be little more than a gimmick to allow a court to apply the law of its own state.

== Theory and reform ==
Scholars and lawyers have identified conflicting aims for the law of tort, to some extent reflected in the different types of damages awarded by the courts: compensatory, aggravated, and punitive. British scholar Glanville Williams notes four possible bases on which different torts rested: appeasement, justice, deterrence, and compensation.

William M. Landes, Richard A. Posner, and Steven Shavell have initiated a line of research in the law and economics literature that is focused on identifying the effects of tort law on people's behavior. These studies often make use of concepts that were developed in the field of game theory. Law and economic scholars characterise law in terms of incentives and deterrence, and identified the aim of tort as being the efficient distribution of risk. Ronald Coase, a principal proponent, argued in The Problem of Social Cost (1960) that the aim of tort law, when transaction costs are high, should be to reflect as closely as possible the allocation of risk and liability at which private parties arrive when transaction costs are low.

Since the mid-to-late 20th century, calls for reform of tort law have come from various perspectives. Some calls for reform stress the difficulties encountered by potential claimants. For example, because not all people who have accidents can find solvent defendants from which to recover damages in the courts, P. S. Atiyah has called the situation a "damages lottery". Consequently, in New Zealand, the government in the 1960s established a no-fault system of state compensation for accidents. In the 1970s, Australia and the United Kingdom drew up proposals for similar no-fault schemes but they were later abandoned.

A wide variety of tort reforms have been implemented or proposed in different jurisdictions, each attempting to address a particular deficiency perceived in the system of tort law. Generally, these can be broken down into two categories: reforms limiting damages recoverable by a plaintiff and procedural reforms limiting the ability of plaintiffs to file lawsuits. A large portion of tort reforms seek to limit the damages a plaintiff can be awarded. The rationale underlying these reforms is that, by limiting the profitability of tort lawsuits to plaintiffs, they will reduce the incentive to file frivolous lawsuits. There are several varieties of reforms to the system of damages:

- Non-economic damages caps place limits on noneconomic damages and collecting lawsuit claim data from malpractice insurance companies and courts in order to assess any connection between malpractice settlements and premium rates. Such caps can be general or limited to a particular category of cases. (Note: For example, the American federal government has instituted a $250,000 cap on non-economic damages for medical malpractice claims.)
- Punitive damages caps limit the amount of punitive damages awardable to a plaintiff. In most civil law jurisdictions, punitive damages are unavailable and are considered contrary to public policy since the civil justice system in many countries does not accord defendants the procedural protections present in the criminal justice system thus penalising an individual without allowing them the ordinary procedural protections that are present in a criminal trial. The rationale for restricting punitive damages is that such damages encourage a vindictive, revenge-seeking state of mind in the claimant and society more generally. In the UK, Rookes v Barnard limited the situations in which punitive damages can be won in tort actions to where they are expressly authorised by a statute, where a defendant's action is calculated to make a profit, or where an official of the state has acted arbitrarily, oppressively or unconstitutionally. In the United States, though rarely awarded in tort cases, punitive damages are available and are sometimes quite staggering when awarded. (Note: For example, in 1999, a Los Angeles County jury awarded $4.8 billion in punitive damages against General Motors to a group of six burn victims whose 1979 Chevrolet Malibu was rear-ended by a drunk driver, causing it to catch fire. That was later reduced to $1.2 billion by the judge.)
- Limits on damages for pain and suffering are another category of tort reform. While tort compensation easily applies to property damage, where the replacement value is a market price (plus interest), but it is difficult to quantify the injuries to a person's body and mind. There is no market for severed legs or sanity of mind, and so there is no price that a court can readily apply in compensation for the wrong. Some courts have developed scales of damages awards, and benchmarks for compensation, which relate to the severity of the injury. For instance, in the United Kingdom, the loss of a thumb is compensated at £18,000, for an arm £72,000, for two arms £150,000, and so on, but while a scale may be consistent, the award itself is arbitrary. Patrick Atiyah has written that one could halve, double, or triple all the awards and it would still make just as much sense as it does now.
- Another reform to compensation, in jurisdictions where it is not already the norm, is to implement the English rule whereby the losing party to a case covers the victorious party's legal costs. In Commonwealth countries as well as certain American states, the losing party must pay for the court costs of the winning party. The English rule Is also a prevailing norm in European civil law jurisdictions. For example, after authors Michael Baigent and Richard Leigh lost their plagiarism litigation over The Da Vinci Code in a British court, they were ordered to pay the defendants' $1.75 million in attorneys' fees. The "American rule" differs; in most cases, each party bears its own expense of litigation. Supporters of tort reform argue that loser-pays rules are fairer, would compensate winners of lawsuits against the costs of litigation, would deter marginal lawsuits and tactical litigation, and would create proper incentives for litigation, and argue for reforms that would require compensation of winning defendants some or all the time. Certain proposed or implemented tort reforms adopt the English rule if the respondent should prevail but retain the American rule otherwise (e.g. California's special motion to strike in defamation suits).

In addition to reforms aimed at limiting plaintiff's abilities to claim particular categories of compensation, tort reform measures aimed at reducing the prevalence of lawsuits for negligence, the most commonly alleged tort, aim to revise the doctrine of comparative negligence. Comparative negligence is a partial legal defence that reduces the amount of damages that a plaintiff can recover in a negligence-based claim based upon the degree to which the plaintiff's own negligence contributed to cause the injury, which progressively displaced the erstwhile traditional doctrine of contributory negligence over the twentieth century which had precluded any damages being awarded in cases in which the plaintiff was deemed to be even partially at fault. Under standard or "pure" comparative negligence, a plaintiff can seek damages regardless of the portion of liability they bear, even where they are found to be more at fault than the respondent. As a tort reform measure aimed at combatting the perceived unfairness of allowing a party to seek extra-contractual damages where they are primarily at fault, many common law jurisdictions have adopted a "modified" doctrine of comparative negligence in which a party may only recover damages if it bears less than half the liability or if the other party bears more than half the liability. More radically, the American states of Alabama, Maryland, North Carolina, and Virginia continue to use contributory negligence, thus precluding a party who is even partly at fault from recovering damages for negligence.

The abolition of the collateral source rule (i.e. the principle that a respondent in a tort action cannot use the fact that a plaintiff has already been compensated as evidence) is another common proposal of tort reform advocates in jurisdictions where the rule exists. They argue that if the plaintiff's injuries and damages have already been compensated, it is unfair and duplicative to allow an award of damages against the respondent. As a result, numerous states have altered or partially abrogated the rule by statute.

Regulation of contingent fees; as well as rules regarding barratry, champerty and maintenance, or litigation funding more generally; is another aspect of procedural policies and reforms designed to reduce the number of cases filed in civil court.

In common law jurisdictions, which typically rely on judicial precedent for the creation and development of new torts, the creation of statutory torts is a means through which legislatures reform and modify tort law. A statutory tort is like any other, in that it imposes duties on private or public parties, however, they are created by the legislature, not the courts. For example, the European Union's Product Liability Directive imposes strict liability for defective products that harm people; such strict liability is not uncommon although not necessarily statutory. As another example, in England common law liability of a landowner to guests or trespassers was replaced by the Occupiers' Liability Act 1957; a similar situation occurred in the U.S. State of California in which a judicial common law rule established in Rowland v. Christian was amended through a 1985 statute. Statutory torts also spread across workplace health and safety laws and health and safety in food. In some cases, federal or state statutes may preempt tort actions, which is particularly discussed in terms of the U.S. FDA Preemption; although actions in the United States for medical devices are preempted due to Riegel v. Medtronic, Inc. (2008), actions for medical drugs are not due to Wyeth v. Levine (2009).

== Comparison with other areas of law ==
Tort law is closely related to other areas of law, particularly contract and criminal law. On one hand, tort and contract law are typically regarded as the two primary fields within the law of obligations, with tort forming a catch-all category encompassing civil wrongs that arise by operation of law in contrast to breach of contract, which encompasses violations of obligations that are freely assumed by parties to a contract. On the other hand, both tort and criminal law aim to address wrongful conduct and often overlap such that conduct which gives rise to a claim under tort law may also give rise to a prosecution under criminal law.

=== Contract law ===
Tort is sometimes viewed as the causes of action which are not defined in other areas such as contract or fiduciary law. However, tort and contract law are similar in that both involve a breach of duties, and in modern law these duties have blurred and it may not be clear whether an action "sounds in tort or contract"; if both apply and different standards apply for each (such as a statute of limitations), courts will determine which is the "gravamen" (the most applicable). Circumstances such as those involving professional negligence may involve both torts and contracts. The choice may affect time limits or damages, particularly given that damages are typically relatively limited in contract cases while in tort cases noneconomic damages such as pain and suffering may be awarded. Punitive damages are relatively uncommon in contractual cases versus tort cases. However, compensation for defective but not unsafe products is typically available only through contractual actions through the law of warranty.

In the United Kingdom, plaintiffs in professional negligence cases have some degree of choice in which law while in commercial transactions contract law applies; in unusual cases, intangible losses have been awarded in contract law cases.

The English case Hadley v. Baxendale (1854), which was adopted in the United States, split contract and tort damages by foreseeability of the damages when the contract was made. In the United States, the pure economic loss rule was adopted to further prevent negligence lawsuits in breach of contract cases. This "economic loss rule" was adopted by the Supreme Court of the United States East River Steamship Corp V Transamerica Delaval Inc. (1986) and expanded across the country in a non-uniform manner, leading to confusion. Among other examples, the tort of insurance bad faith arises out of a contractual relationship, and "collateral torts" such as wrongful dismissal involving possible overlap with labour law contracts.

=== Criminal law ===
There is some overlap between criminal law and tort. For example, in English law an assault is both a crime and a tort (a form of trespass to the person). A tort allows a person to obtain a remedy that serves their own purposes (for example, the payment of damages or the obtaining of injunctive relief). Criminal actions on the other hand are pursued not to obtain remedies to assist a person – although often criminal courts do have the power to grant such remedies – but to remove their liberty on the state's behalf. This explains why incarceration is usually available as a penalty for serious crimes, but not usually for torts. In early common law, the distinction between crime and tort was not distinct.

The more severe penalties available in criminal law also mean that it requires a higher burden of proof to be discharged than the related tort. As with other areas of private law, the burden of proof required in tort, known either as the 'balance of probabilities' in English common law or 'preponderance of evidence' in American law, is lower than the higher standard of 'beyond a reasonable doubt'. Sometimes a claimant may prevail in a tort case even if the defendant who allegedly caused harm were acquitted in an earlier criminal trial. For example, O. J. Simpson was acquitted in the criminal court of murder but later found liable for the tort of wrongful death.

Both tort law and criminal law may impose liability where there is intentional action, reckless behaviour, carelessness, product liability without negligence (in the US and the EU), innocence, provided there is strict liability, battery, assault or trespass.

Under Indian tort law and in other jurisdictions which adopted a version of the 1860 Indian Penal Code, the torts of assault and battery are interpreted with reference to equivalent criminal offences under the Indian Penal Code.

== See also ==
- Outline of tort law
- Causation in English law
- Index of tort articles
- Journal of Tort Law
