= Tort law in India =

Aspect of Indian law

- National flag of Republic of India

Legal system
- Common law

Sources of tort law
- Common law
- Statutes

Categories of tort law
- Assault
- Battery
- False imprisonment
- Negligence
- Professional negligence
- Contributory negligence
- Defamation
- Economic torts
- Conspiracy
- Fraud
- Intentional interference
- Restraint of trade
- Land torts
- Trespass
- Nuisance
- Rule in Rylands v Fletcher
- Constitutional torts

Tort law in India is primarily governed by judicial precedent as in other common law jurisdictions, supplemented by statutes governing damages, civil procedure, and codifying common law torts. As in other common law jurisdictions, a tort is breach of a non-contractual duty which has caused damage to the plaintiff giving rise to a civil cause of action and for which remedy is available. If a remedy does not exist, a tort has not been committed since the rationale of tort law is to provide a remedy to the person who has been wronged.

While Indian tort law is generally derived from English law, there are certain differences between the two systems. Indian tort law uniquely includes remedies for constitutional torts, which are actions by the government that infringe upon rights enshrined in the Constitution, as well as a system of absolute liability for businesses engaged in hazardous activity.

== Background ==
As tort law is similar in nature across common law jurisdictions, courts have readily referred to case law from other common law jurisdictions such as the UK, Australia, and Canada in addition to domestic precedent. However, attention is given to local norms and conditions, as well as India's distinct constitutional framework in applying foreign precedent. The legislature have also created statutes to provide for certain social conditions. Similar to other common law countries, aspects of tort law have been codified.

Certain conduct which gives rise to a cause of action under tort law is additionally criminalised by the Indian Penal Code or other criminal legislation. Where a tort also constitutes a criminal offence, its prosecution by the state does not preclude the aggrieved party from seeking a remedy under tort law. The overlap between the two areas of law is a result of the distinct purposes each serves and the nature of the remedies each provides. Tort law aims to hold a tortfeasor accountable and consequently tort actions are brought directly by the aggrieved party in order to seek damages, whereas criminal law aims to punish and deter conduct deemed to be against the interests of society and criminal actions are thus brought by the state and penalties include imprisonment, fines, or execution.

In India, as in the majority of common law jurisdictions, the standard of proof in tort cases is the balance of probabilities as opposed to the reasonable doubt standard used in criminal cases or the preponderance of the evidence standard used in American tort litigation, although the latter is extremely similar in practice to the balance of probabilities standard. Similar to the constitutional presumption of innocence in Indian criminal law, the burden of proof is on the plaintiff in tort actions in India. India, like the majority of common law jurisdictions in Asia and Africa, does not permit the use of juries in civil or criminal trials, in direct contrast to America and the Canadian common law provinces which retain civil juries as well as to jurisdictions like England and Wales or New Zealand which permit juries in a limited set of tort actions.

== Categories of torts ==
=== Trespass to the person ===
A trespass, or offence, to the person is any tort characterised by harming or threatening to harm an individual's body. This category of tort is closely related to criminal law as the grounds giving rise to a claim for each tort in this category generally constitutes grounds for prosecution under the penal code.. In contemporary Indian tort law, there are three torts of this variety:

- Assault: While it is typically defined by case law in England or other common law jurisdictions, assault in Indian tort law (and in jurisdictions such as Singapore, Pakistan, Bangladesh, and Malaysia who adopted the Indian penal code at the formation of the Straits Settlements or the dissolution of the British Indian Empire) is based on the definition provided in section 351 of the penal code. In accordance with the penal code, Indian courts have held that to constitute assault it is not necessary that there should be some actual hurt caused. A threat constitutes assault. Per section 351, the following criteria constitute assault:
  - Making of any gesture or preparation by a person in the presence of another.
  - Intention or knowledge of likelihood that such gesture or preparation will cause the person present to apprehend that the person making it is about to use criminal force on him.
- Battery: The criteria for battery in Indian tort law is equivalent to that of criminal force defined in Section 350 of the Indian Penal Code: "Whoever intentionally uses force to any person, without that person's consent in order to the committing of any offence or intending by the use of such force he will cause injury, fear, or annoyance to the person to whom the force is used is said to use criminal force to that other".
- False imprisonment "is the complete deprivation of his liberty for any time, however short, without lawful cause ... There need not be any actual imprisonment in the ordinary sense." This tort is roughly equivalent to wrongful confinement under 342 of the penal code and additionally encompasses the more specific conduct related to kidnapping under section 359. The ingredients of this tort are as follows:
  - Restraint must be complete.
  - There must be no reasonable condition imposed by occupiers of premises.
  - There must be no reasonable and honest belief which would justify the confinement.

=== Negligence ===
Negligence is a failure to exercise appropriate and/or ethical ruled care expected to be exercised amongst specified circumstances. With regard to negligence, Indian jurisprudence follows the approach stated in Ratanlal & Dhirajlal: The Law of Torts, laying down three elements:

- A duty of care (i.e. a legal duty to exercise "ordinary care and skill")
- A violation of the appropriate standard of care (Note: In other words, the breach of the duty caused by the omission to do something which a reasonable person, guided by those considerations which ordinarily regulate the conduct of human affairs would do, or doing something which a reasonable person would not do.)
- Causation (i.e. the violation resulted in injury to the plaintiff's person or property)

The Indian approach to professional negligence requires that any skilled task requires a skilled professional. Such a professional would be expected to be exercising his skill with reasonable competence. Professionals may be held liable for negligence on one of two findings:

- They were not possessed of the requisite skill which he professed to have possessed.
- They did not exercise, with reasonable competence in the given case, the skill which he did possess. The standard to be applied for determining whether or not either of the two findings can be made is whether a competent person exercising ordinary skill in that profession would possess or exercise in a similar manner the skill in question. Consequently, it is not necessary for every professional to possess the highest level of expertise in that branch which he practices. Professional opinion is generally accepted, but courts may rule otherwise if they feel that the opinion is "not reasonable or responsible".

=== Defamation ===
Defamation law in India largely resembles that of England and Wales. Indian courts have endorsed the defences of absolute and qualified privilege, fair comment, and justification. While statutory law in the United Kingdom provides that, if the defendant is only successful in proving the truth of some of the several charges against him, the defence of justification might still be available if the charges not proved do not materially injure the reputation, there is no corresponding provision in India, though it is likely that Indian courts would treat this principle as persuasive precedent. Recently, incidents of defamation in relation to public figures have attracted public attention.

In Indian law, there is little distinction between libel and slander and both are actionable per se. In United Kingdom, only libel and certain types of slander are actionable per se. Similarly, while criminal libel in UK was abolished in 2010, both slander and libel remain criminal offences in India and other jurisdictions applying versions of the Indian Penal Code. Consequently, individuals liable for defamation in India are subject not just to damages under tort law but also to imprisonment under criminal law. In addition to damages, courts may also issue an injunction to stop further publication of defamatory material.

=== Economic torts ===
Economic Torts seek to protect a person in relation to his trade, business or livelihood.

While Indian courts have been reluctant to award damages for the economic torts of simple and unlawful conspiracy as well as inducing breach of contract due to the confused state of the law, damages are regularly awarded for torts affecting economic interests under the conspiracy to injure and courts have referred to English precedent on the matter.

The courts have been more willing to adopt English precedent in areas such as the tort of deceit, unlawful interference with trade, intimidation, and malicious falsehood which constitute an intentional attempt to undermine the interests of a specific party.

=== Property torts ===
Property torts seek to prevent interference with property in the possession of another. With regard to land, interference may take the form of entering land or part of it, or of remaining there after the withdrawal of permission, or of dispossessing the occupant. Similarly, with regard to chattels, interference may take place in the form of depriving an individual of rightful possession.

The following two land torts currently exist under Indian law:

- Trespass to land is any direct interference with land in the possession of another and is actionable per se. Examples of trespass are unauthorised entry to land, placing things on land and inducing animals to enter. Also, continuing trespass, which is actionable from day to day, occurs when there is continuation of presence after permission is withdrawn. The position taken with regards to the elements of trespass is similar in the UK and India.
- Nuisance is a form of lesser interference with land. It may be private or public, and private nuisance has come to cover the conduct of the defendants which affects the claimant's interest in the land. The law regarding nuisance in India is closely modelled after that in England and Wales. This could be done by affecting materially their land, affecting their use or enjoyment of it, or interfering with servitudes and similar rights over the land. While private nuisance is always actionable, public nuisance is not. A claimant of public nuisance has to establish special loss over and above the inconvenience suffered by the public in general. Although originating as an outgrowth of nuisance as a tort in English law, public nuisance is regarded as a crime under the Indian Penal Code as well as under contemporary English law since it would be unreasonable for everyone inconvenienced by it to be allowed to claim.

The following torts with regard to personal property exist in India and other common law jurisdictions:

- Trespass to chattels is any direct interference with property other than land in the lawful possession of another person without thereby depriving the person of possession as a whole. Examples of this may include vandalising or otherwise modifying an individual's personal property, as well as using such property without permission.
- Conversion is the equivalent in tort law to theft or larceny under criminal law. In an action for conversion, a plaintiff essentially asserts that the defendant has stolen their property and either seeks the return of the property or compensation for the property in the form of damages. A plaintiff may also seek restitution for any profit the tortfeasor made through the use of the property, compensation for profits lost as a result of the conversion, and damages for any other pecuniary loss caused by the conversion. In an action for conversion, a plaintiff is required to prove intent to convert the tangible or intangible property of another to one's own possession and use, and that he property in question is subsequently converted.

=== Sui generis torts originating in India ===
While the majority of torts in contemporary Indian law are legal transplants from England and are shared with other common law jurisdictions, a limited number of torts originated in India as a result of the country's distinct constitutional jurisprudence and Asian norms. These torts are confined to consumer protection and the enforcement of human rights, and are closely linked to India's legal culture of public interest litigation, which more closely resembles North American class action lawsuits and private attorney general suits than litigation in the United Kingdom.

Absolute liability, under the rule in M. C. Mehta v. Union of India, in Indian tort law is a unique outgrowth of the doctrine of strict liability for ultrahazardous activities. Under the precedent established in the English case of Rylands v Fletcher, upon which the Indian doctrine of absolute liability is based, anyone who in the course of "non-natural" use of his land "accumulates" thereon for his own purposes anything likely to cause mischief if it escapes is answerable for all direct damage thereby caused. While, in England and many other common law jurisdictions, this precedent is used to impose strict liability on certain areas of nuisance law and is strictly "a remedy for damage to land or interests in land" under which "damages for personal injuries are not recoverable", Indian courts have developed this rule into a distinct principle of absolute liability, where an enterprise is absolutely liable, without exceptions, to compensate everyone affected by any accident resulting from the operation of hazardous activity. This differs greatly from the UK approach as it includes all kinds of resulting liability other than damage to land.

Another area of tort that developed in India which differs from the UK is the notion of constitutional torts. Creating constitutional torts is a public law remedy for violations of rights, generally by agents of the state, and is implicitly premised on the strict liability principle. The tort was further entrenched when the court allowed compensation to be awarded as "a remedy available in public law; based on strict liability for the contravention of fundamental rights to which the principle of sovereign immunity does not apply, even though it may be available as a defence in private law in an action based on tort". This approach is vastly different from the approach taken in UK as compensation for damages is not an available public law remedy. In practice, constitutional torts in India serve the role served by administrative courts in many civil law jurisdictions and much of the function of constitutional review in other jurisdictions, thereby functioning as a branch of administrative law rather than private law. Rather than developing principles of administrative fairness as a distinct branch of law as other common law jurisdictions have, Indian courts have thus extended tort law as it applies between private parties to address unlawful administrative and legislative action.

=== Torts not recognised in India ===
Like the United Kingdom and British Columbia, but unlike Ontario and most jurisdictions in the United States, Indian tort law does not traditionally recognise invasion of privacy or intrusion on seclusion as a tort. Nevertheless, there is a shift in jurisprudence toward recognising breech of confidentiality as an actionable civil wrong. Proponents of protection for privacy under Indian tort law argue that "the right to privacy is implicit" in Article 21 of the Constitution of India, which guarantees protections for personal liberties. Despite the lack of a tort addressing violations of privacy by private individuals, the Supreme Court recognised privacy as a constitutional right in 2017.

Similarly, neither intentional infliction of emotional distress (IIED) nor negligent infliction of emotional distress (NIED) is recognised as a tort in Indian jurisprudence. While claims seeking damages for infliction of emotional distress were historically an accessory claim in a tort action alleging another distinct tort, the doctrine has evolved in North America into a stand-alone tort while English jurisprudence has evolved to typically recognise only recognised psychiatric injuries as grounds for compensation. Indian courts, while recognising the infliction of emotional distress regardless of intention as an actionable wrong in matrimonial disputes, typically follow the English approach, although case law from both the United Kingdom and the North America is frequently employed by judges ruling on cases in which damages for mental distress are sought.

== Damages ==
=== Calculation of damages ===
Damages in the law of torts in India are premised on the concept of restitutio ad integrum. India adopts a compensatory method and advocates "full and fair compensation" in all cases.

In determining the quantum of damages, the Indian court will look to similar cases that may enable comparison.

India's formulation of damages for tort cases is premised on the multiplier method, awarding compensation based on the degree of compromise to the earning ability of the victim. Under the multiplier method, the fair and just amount represents

the number of years' purchase on which the loss of dependency is capitalised. Then allowance to scale down the multiplier would have to be made taking into account the uncertainties of the future. The allowance for immediate lump sum payment the period over which the dependency is to last being shorter and the capital feed also to be spent away over the period of dependency is to last.

The multiplier principle is encapsulated in a statutory form for tortious cases involving personal injuries caused by motor vehicles, under the Motor Vehicle Act. However, in so calculating, the court will take into account inflation in calculating damages.

=== Damages for personal injuries ===
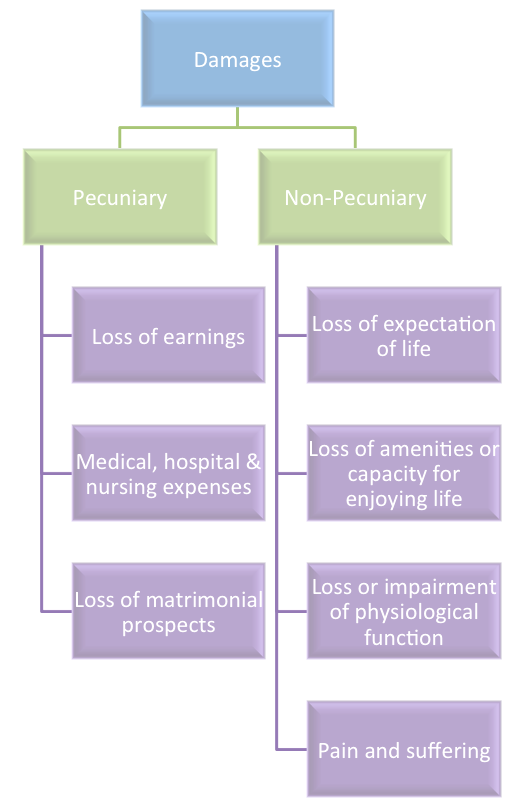
Heads of claims under personal injury

Indian jurisprudence identifies seven distinct categories of harm for which damages may be awarded in tort actions involving personal injuries. These categories are referred to as heads of claim and can be divided into pecuniary and non-pecuniary subsets, analogous to the more general distinction made between economic and non-economic damages in other common law jurisdictions. Indian tort law recognises the following pecuniary heads of claim:

- Loss of earning.
- Medical, hospital and nursing expenses.
- The loss of matrimonial prospects.

Contemporary Indian jurisprudence also recognises the following non-pecuniary heads of claim:

- Loss of expectation of life.
- Loss of amenities or capacity for enjoying life.
- Loss or impairment of physiological function.
- Pain and suffering.

=== Approach towards pain and suffering ===
In analysing pain and suffering, several factors such as severity of injury, medical treatment required, psychological stress and long-term physical and emotional scars, would be taken into account.

In cases of victims who were unconscious, one must award not only for the "loss of amenities and loss of expectation of life, but also for pain and suffering". Such damages are awarded not as a matter of "solace". This view comes close to that expressed by Lord Scarman in Lim Poh Choo v Camden and Islington Area Health Authority, difference being that an award must be "made even for pain and suffering in case of unconscious plaintiffs". The reason for so doing is that it "looks strange that wrongdoer whose negligence makes the victim unconscious is placed in a more advantageous position than one who inflicts a lesser injury which does not render the victim unconscious".

There are three guiding principles in measuring the quantum of compensation for pain and suffering:

- Amount of compensation awarded must be reasonable and must be assessed with moderation.
- Regard must be had to awards made in comparable cases.
- The sum awarded must to a considerable extent be conventional.

=== Punitive damages ===
Influenced by Rookes v Barnard, Indian courts initially ruled that punitive damages can be awarded in only three categories:

- Cases where the plaintiff is injured by the oppressive, arbitrary or unconstitutional action by a servant of the government.
- Cases in which the defendant's conduct has been calculated by him to make a profit for himself which may well exceed the compensation payable to the plaintiff.
- Where provided by statute.

However, this stand has since shifted with an expanding tort jurisdiction. The Supreme Court accepted a committee's suggestion to evolve a "principle of liability – punitive in nature – on account of vandalism and rioting". The reasoning given was that it "would deter people from similar behaviour in the future".

In an environmental tort case, the defendant was made to pay exemplary damages "so that it may act as deterrent for others not to cause pollution in any manner".

Presently, in addition to compensatory damages and restitution, aggravated damages may be awarded to compensate victims for hurt feelings in certain cases. These damages are determined by examining if the defendant's conduct aggravated the plaintiff's damage by injuring "feelings of dignity, safety, and pride".

==== Comparative negligence ====
While the traditional approach of contributory negligence held that a plaintiff who bore even partial responsibility for the harm they experienced due to negligence could not recover damages in tort law, contemporary Indian jurisprudence is based on the principle of comparative negligence. Consequently, when a person fails to use reasonable care for the safety of either of himself or his property such that that they become blameworthy in part as an "author of [their] own wrong", any damages they may recover are reduced in proportion with the extent of their liability.

== Criticism ==
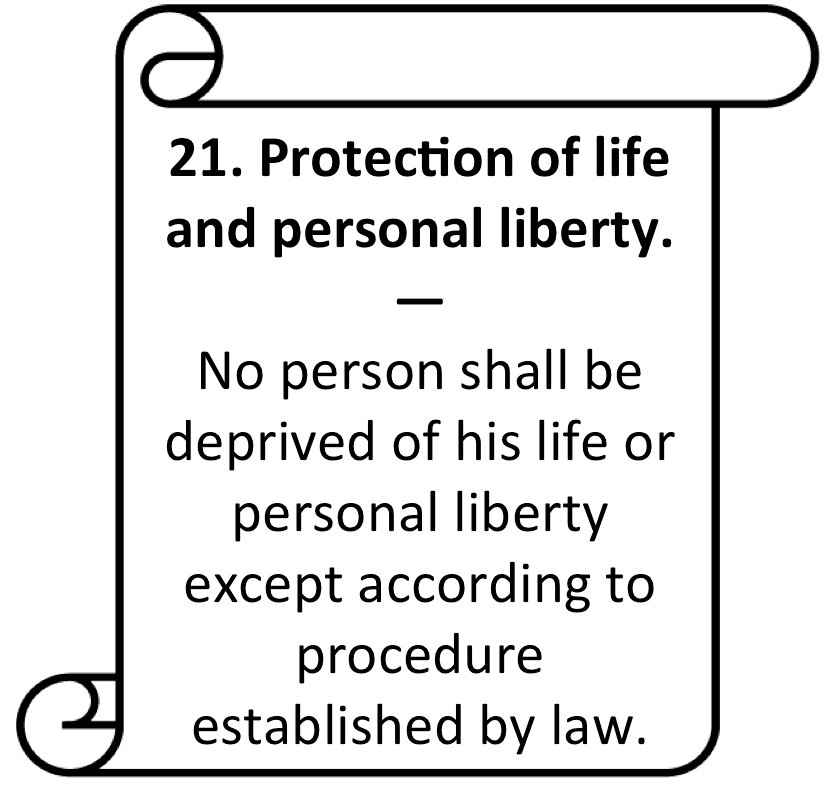
Article 21 is at contention here with regards to constitutional torts.

India's tort system has been criticised for a variety of reasons, ranging from delays and outdated procedural rules to substantive criticism of the implications of its system of absolute liability and the unpredictability of judicial activism enabled by constitutional torts.

=== Procedural deficiencies ===
The delay in delivery of justice is a major problem plaguing India. This has been attributed to reasons such a low judge to population ratio (1 judge per 100,000 capita, with a small number of courts available), as well as poor administrative governance.

Outmoded procedural laws allow for delaying tactics, such as interlocutory appeals and stay orders. The government has also been accused of employing delay tactics whenever it is a litigant, appealing even when the chance of success is remote. As a result, the system appears to resemble a "sunk cost auction", where litigants invest ever-increasing amounts to stave off higher losses.

Despite being often cited as a litigious country, the rate of litigation is low, due to problems such as long delays, heavy expenses and meagre damage awards. There has apparently been an increase in litigation over the past years, especially with cases involving the government. This has been said to be due to India's socio-economic growth and the resultant sensitisation regarding legal rights. Due to the problems noted, it has been stated that reformation lay with the parliamentarians and legislators. Structural reforms are to be brought about by amendments to legislation, while operational reforms can only be brought about by "a change in mindset".

=== Absolute liability ===
One of the controversies in Indian tort law concerns the rule on absolute liability. The extremely strict approach, where even acts of God are not recognised as a defence is severely criticised especially since it disregarded the "generally accepted parameter of minimum competence and reasonable care". The implementation of such a rule endangers the growth of science and technical industries, as investors have to take the risk of liability given that there is no defence to the rule.

=== Constitutional torts and public interest litigation ===
In hearing public interest litigation and creating constitutional torts, the Indian judiciary has been criticised for being overly activist and overstepping its jurisdiction. By creating constitutional torts, they are accused of usurping both legislative and administrative functions. Controversy further arose when judges began to read such obligations of the state into Article 21 of the Indian Constitution to impose vicarious liability on the state. However, proponents of public interest litigation and constitutional torts argue that their impact has been to facilitate "social and distributive justice".

== See also ==
- Judiciary of India
- Indian Penal Code
- Tort law
- Common law
- Negligence
- Medical negligence
- Contributory negligence
- Law of India
