= Henry H. Drummonds =

American legal scholar and attorney

Henry H. Drummonds is an American legal scholar and attorney whose work has focused on labor and employment law, international labor markets, products liability, Toxic Torts and related areas of law. He was a professor of law at Lewis & Clark Law School from 1989 to 2023 and also taught international human rights through programs associated with the University of San Diego School of Law and a human rights course sponsored by and at East China University in Shanghai, China.

== Early life and education ==
Drummonds received a Bachelor of Arts from the University of Oregon, where he served as Student Body President, and was elected to Phi Beta Kappa. Professor Drummonds served in the U. S. Army from 1967 to 1969.

He earned a Juris Doctor from Harvard Law School, where he served as a senior editor of the Harvard Law Review. While in law school, he also worked as an assistant to Professor Roger Fisher, clerked for Ralph Nader at the Center for Responsive Law, and at the Arnold and Porter law firm in Washington D.C.

After law school Professor Drummonds served as a law clerk to California Supreme Court Justice Mathew Tobringer.

== Career ==
=== Legal practice ===
Drummonds practiced law in Oregon, briefly as an associate at Johnson and Harrang in Eugene and for 15 years as a partner at the labor law firm of Kulongoski, Heid, Durham and Drummonds and successor firms in Eugene and Portland. He also served as an advisor to Oregon Governors John Kitzhaber and Ted Kulongoski on labor and employment relations matters from 1995 to 2003.

=== Academia ===
Drummonds joined Lewis & Clark Law School as an associate professor in 1989 and became a professor of law in 1996. He remained at the law school through 2023. His teaching and research areas included labor and employment law, global labor markets, public and private-sector labor relations, torts, toxic torts, and products liability.

He taught international human rights at the University of San Diego's Paris Institute on International and Comparative Law in 2012 and at its Dublin Institute on International and Comparative Law at Trinity College Dublin in 2009. Professor Drummonds also lectured at East China University in Shanghai, China, Stanford Law School, New York University, and Oregon Health Sciences University.

=== Government and professional service ===
He served as Oregon's U.S. Commissioner on Uniform State Laws beginning in 2004. He was a member of the executive committee of the Oregon State Bar Labor and Employment Law Section from 2005 to 2011 and of its Products Liability Section from 2007 to 2009. He also served on the editorial board of the CCH Labor Law Journal.

== Personal life ==
Drummonds is married to Debra Denise Holland Drummonds. Professor Drummonds has a son, Michele Saverio Drummonds.

== Publications ==
Drummonds has published articles and book chapters concerning labor law, employment law, international employment, products liability, arbitration, and retirement policy. His publications include:

- “The Public Policy Exception to Labor Arbitration Award Enforcement: A Path Through the Bramble Bush,” Willamette Law Review 49 (2012).
- “Cross-Border Employment Contracts: Choice of Law and Choice of Forum and Enforcement of Cross-Border Judgments in the European Union,” in Global Labor and Employment Law for the Practicing Lawyer (2010).
- “Reforming Labor Law by Reforming Labor Law Preemption Doctrine to Allow the States to Make More Labor Relations Policy,” Louisiana Law Review 70 (2009).
- “Beyond the Employee Free Choice Act Debate: Unleashing the States in Labor-Management Relations Policy by Reforming Labor Law Preemption Doctrine Crafted by Judges a Half-Century Ago,” Cornell Journal of Law and Public Policy 19 (2009).
- “American Employees Abroad: The Extraterritorial Effect of U.S. Discrimination and Other Employee Statutes,” Oregon Civil Rights Newsletter (2008).
- “The Union Card Majority Debate,” Labor Law Journal 58 (2007).
- “The Aging of the Boomers and America's Changing Retirement System,” Lewis & Clark Law Review 11 (2007).
- "The Sister Sovereign States: Preemption and the Second Twentieth Century Revolution in the Law of the American Workplace," 62 Fordham L. Rev.469 (1993)
- "Employment Law for Transnational Businesses in a World of Nikes and Microsofts," 4 Small and Emerging Bus. L. (2000).
- "Workplace Secrets, Loyalty, and Theft," 20 Lewis and Clark L. Rev. 399 (2016).
