= Invasion of privacy (disambiguation) =

The right to privacy is an element of various legal traditions that intends to restrain governmental and private actions that threaten the privacy of individuals.

Invasion of privacy may also refer to:

== Law ==
- Privacy laws of the United States, which define several "invasion of privacy" torts
  - Intrusion on seclusion, a tort of intentionally and offensively intruding on someone's private affairs
    - Reasonable expectation of privacy (United States), one element of an intrusion claim
  - False light, publicity about someone that creates a misleading and offensive impression
  - Personality rights, rights to control the use of one's name and likeness
  - The Right to Privacy (article), an essay by Louis Brandeis and Samuel Warren

== Music ==
- Invasion of Privacy (album), a 2018 album by Cardi B
- Invasion of Your Privacy, a 1985 album by Ratt
- "Invasion of Privacy", a 1980 single by Gary Wilson

== Film ==
- Invasion of Privacy (film), a 1996 film directed by Anthony Hickox

== Technology ==
- Privacy-invasion software, computer software that invades privacy

== See also ==
- Internet privacy
- Privacy concerns with social networking services
