= Toxic tort =

Type of personal injury lawsuit due to exposure to dangerous substances

A toxic tort claim is a specific type of personal injury lawsuit in which the plaintiff claims that exposure to a chemical or dangerous substance caused the plaintiff's injury or disease.

== Place of exposure ==
People may be exposed to toxic chemicals or similar dangerous substances from pharmaceutical products, consumer products, the environment, or in the home or at work. Many toxic tort cases arise either from the use of medications, or through exposure at work.

=== Occupational exposure ===
There have also been many occupational toxic tort cases, because industrial and other workers are often chronically exposed to toxic chemicals - more so than consumers and residents. Thousands of toxic chemicals are used in industry and workers in these areas can experience a variety of toxic injuries. Unlike the general population, which is exposed to trace amounts of thousands of different chemicals in the environment, industrial workers may be regularly exposed to much higher levels of chemicals and therefore have a greater risk of developing disease from particular chemical exposures than the general population.

An occupational toxic injury case may result in a workers' compensation claim, which is made against the worker's employer. The same injury can potentially support a toxic tort case against "third parties", that is, people or entities other than the employer, such as manufacturers or distributors of chemicals, substances or equipment that exposed the worker to the chemicals, or the people or entities in control of the premises where the worker was exposed to the toxic chemicals.

=== Pharmaceuticals ===
Pharmaceutical injuries can occur when a person is injured by a dangerous, defective or contaminated medication. Many pharmaceutical toxic injury cases are mass tort cases, as most medications are consumed by thousands of people. The cases are often litigated against drug manufacturers and distributors, and potentially against prescribing physicians. When prosecuted against drug manufacturers and distributors, pharmaceutical toxic tort cases differ from medical malpractice suits in that pharmaceutical toxic tort cases are essentially product liability cases, the defective product being the drug.

=== Injury at home ===
The home has recently become the subject of toxic tort litigation, due to exposure to mold contamination, construction materials such as wood or carpeting treated with formaldehyde, and pesticides, and lead paint. Some imported consumer items, such as toys and ceramics, may be produced with dangerously high levels of lead.

=== Environmental exposure ===
People may also be injured from environmental toxins in the air or in drinking water.

== Common chemicals in toxic tort cases ==
When a toxic tort case is based on chemical exposure, the following chemicals may be involved:

- Nerve agents (including sarin)
- Mercury
- Asbestos
- Benzene
- Beryllium
- Dioxins and dioxin-like compounds / Agent Orange
- Manganese
- Polychlorinated biphenyl (PCB)
- Pesticides
- Silica
- Hexavalent chromium
- Chromium(III) oxide

== Common diseases in toxic tort cases ==
Among the medical conditions that may be alleged to be caused by exposure to a toxic substance, the following may be claimed in toxic tort cases.

- Aplastic anemia
- Asbestosis
- Berylliosis
- Byssinosis
- Hodgkins disease
- Interstitial lung disease
- Leukemia
- Lymphoma
- Manganism
- Mesothelioma
- Multiple myeloma
- Pneumoconiosis
- Sarcoidosis
- Silicosis
- Thrombocytopenic purpura

== See also ==
- Brownfields
- Carcinogens
- Erin Brockovich
- Groundwater remediation
- Respirator
- Toxicity
