= Dignitary tort =

Type of intentional tort

In tort law, dignitary torts involve non-physical harm, such as damage to reputation. Historically, this category of torts was often covered by the writ of trespass vi et armis.

Historically, the primary dignitary torts were battery, assault, and false imprisonment, as each claimed harm to a person's human dignity. A cause of action could be brought for battery, for example, even if no injury was done to the plaintiff, so long as the contact would be offensive to a reasonable person. Under modern jurisprudence the category of dignitary torts is more closely associated with secondary dignitary torts, most notably defamation (slander and libel), false light, intentional infliction of emotional distress, invasion of privacy, and alienation of affections. In some jurisdictions, the phrase is limited to those torts which do not require physical injury or threat of physical injury, limiting the class to only those secondary incidents.

Some commentators include negligent infliction of emotional distress as a dignitary tort because it protects emotional well-being, despite the absence of physical injury, while others treat it solely as a negligence tort.

== History ==
The torts now commonly described as dignitary torts originated in medieval English common law as distinct forms of action, rather than as a unified category. Actions for battery, assault, and false imprisonment were historically brought under the writ of trespass vi et armis, which protected direct and forcible invasions of the person. Because these actions were understood to vindicate personal rights as well as compensate measurable injury, a plaintiff could often recover damages even without proof of physical harm or economic loss, particularly where the defendant's conduct was considered offensive to personal dignity. Modern scholars have observed that the early common-law forms of action protected a variety of personal interests without treating them as a single body of "dignitary" law.

In the twentieth century, American tort scholars increasingly attempted to group a number of causes of action under the concept of "dignitary torts". Although the label gained acceptance, a number of scholars have concluded that these torts do not constitute an easily unified doctrine because they protect different kinds of personal interests.

== Theory ==
Historically, torts have been classified either by the degree of intent required (e.g., intentional torts, negligence, and strict liability), and by the kind of injury incurred (physical, emotional, or economic). Dignitary torts are instead classified according to the interest protected, that being the dignity of the individual, an interest that cuts across the conventional classifications. In the context of this set of torts, "dignity" is a placeholder for being offended, embarrassed, ridiculed, misrepresented, or otherwise denied respect for one's intrinsic worth.

It has been argued that in the United States, First Amendment jurisprudence concerning defamation, privacy, and related speech torts has redirected scholarly attention away from building a unified law of dignitary torts and toward constitutional limitations on individual torts.
