= Pandectists =

19th-century German legal scholars

The Pandectists were German university legal scholars in the early 19th century who studied and taught Roman law as a model of what they called Konstruktionsjurisprudenz (conceptual jurisprudence) as codified in the Pandects of Justinian (Berman).

Beginning in the mid-19th century, the Pandectists were attacked in arguments by noted jurists Julius Hermann von Kirchmann and Rudolf von Jhering, who favored a modern approach of law as a practical means to an end (Weber).

In the United States, Oliver Wendell Holmes Jr. and other legal realists pushed for laws based on what judges and the courts actually did, rather than the historical and conceptual or academic law of Friedrich Carl von Savigny and the Pandectists (Rosenberg).

== See also ==
- Corpus Juris Civilis
- Law of Germany
- Civil code
- Roman law
