= Mass tort =

Civil lawsuit involving many plaintiffs and few defendants

A mass tort is a civil action involving numerous plaintiffs against one or a few defendants in state or federal court. The lawsuits arise out of the defendants causing numerous injuries through the same or similar act of harm (e.g. a prescription drug, a medical device, a defective product, a train accident, a plane crash, pollution, or a construction disaster).

== Background ==
Law firms sometimes use mass media to reach potential plaintiffs. In U.S. federal courts, mass tort claims are often consolidated as multidistrict litigation. In some cases, mass torts are addressed through a class action.

== Categories ==
The main categories of mass torts include:

- Medical device injuries
- Motor vehicle defects
- Prescription drug injuries
- Product liability injuries
- Toxic contamination

== In popular culture ==
- John Grisham (2003). The King of Torts. Delta. ISBN 978-0385339650.
