= Ultrahazardous activity =

Type of tort

An ultrahazardous activity in the common law of torts is one that is so inherently dangerous that a person engaged in such an activity can be held strictly liable for injuries caused to another person, even if the person engaged in the activity took every reasonable precaution to prevent others from being injured. In the Restatement of the Law 2d, Torts 2d, the term has been abandoned in favor of the phrase "inherently dangerous activity."

== Categories of ultrahazardous activity ==
Several categories of activities are commonly recognized as being inherently hazardous; those who engage in them are subject to strict liability. These include:

- Transportation, storage, and use of dynamite and other explosives
- Transportation, storage, and use of radioactive materials
- Transportation, storage, and use of certain hazardous chemicals
- Keeping of wild animals (i.e. animals that are not normally domesticated in that area)
  - Note that in this context, "domesticated" does not merely refer to animals that are commonly bred and raised in captivity, such as alligators.
- Keeping of domesticated animals that have a known propensity for dangerous behavior (e.g. keeping a dog that has attacked people before)

Someone who is injured by one of these inherently hazardous activities while trespassing on the property of the person engaged in the activity is barred from suing under a strict liability theory. Instead, they must prove that the property owner was negligent.

In England and Wales, this area of law is governed by the rule established in Rylands v Fletcher.

== Determining if an activity is ultrahazardous ==
Factors determining an activity is ultrahazardous:

1. The relative possibility of harm.
2. The level of seriousness of potential harm.
3. The level of activity – most persons would not regularly engage in ultrahazardous activities.
4. Whether decreasing the possibility of harm requires exceptional measures of caution.
5. Whether the risk of the activity outweighs its social value.
6. Inappropriateness of the activity in the area where it is engaged in.
