= Intrusion on seclusion =

One of the four privacy torts

Intrusion on seclusion is one of the four privacy torts created under U.S. common law. Intrusion on seclusion is commonly thought to be the bread-and-butter claim for an "invasion of privacy". Seclusion is defined as the state of being private and away from people.

== Elements ==
The elements of an intrusion on seclusion claim are:

- The defendant intentionally intruded upon the plaintiff's seclusion or private concerns.
- The intrusion would be highly offensive to a reasonable person.
- The intrusion caused the plaintiff anguish and suffering.

There is no requirement that the defendant disclosed any facts about the plaintiff, as in a public disclosure claim, or even that the defendant obtained any private information about the plaintiff at all. Liability attaches to the intrusion itself.

=== Intent ===
Someone "commits an intentional intrusion only if he believes, or is substantially certain, that he lacks the necessary legal or personal permission to commit the intrusive act."

For example, the Veterans Administration did not intrude on a patient's seclusion when it believed that it had the patient's consent to disclose his medical records.

The intent element is subjective, based on what the defendant actually knew or believed about whether it had consent or legal permission, whereas the offensiveness element is judged under an objective standard, based on whether a reasonable person would consider the intrusion to be highly offensive.

=== Seclusion ===
In order to intrude on someone's seclusion, the person must have a "legitimate expectation of privacy" in the physical place or personal affairs intruded upon.

To be successful, a plaintiff "must show the defendant penetrated some zone of physical or sensory privacy" or "obtained unwanted access to data" in which the plaintiff had "an objectively reasonable expectation of seclusion or solitude in the place, conversation or data source."

For example, a delicatessen employee told co-workers that she had a staph infection. The co-workers then informed their manager, who contacted the employee's doctor to determine if she actually had a staph infection, because employees in Arkansas with a communicable disease are forbidden from working in the food preparation industry.

The employee with the staph infection sued her employer, the deli, for intruding on her private affairs. The court held that the deli manager had not intruded upon the worker's private affairs because the worker had made her staph infection public by telling her two co-workers about it.

The court said:

When Fletcher learned that she had a staph infection, she informed two coworkers of her condition. Fletcher's revelation of private information to coworkers eliminated Fletcher's expectation of privacy by making what was formerly private a topic of office conversation.

=== Offensiveness ===
In determining whether an intrusion is objectively "highly offensive", a court is supposed to examine "all the circumstances of an intrusion, including the motives or justification of the intruder."

==== Websites' data collection ====
A website may commit a "highly offensive" act by collecting information from website visitors using "duplicitous tactics". A website that violates its own privacy policy does not automatically commit a highly offensive act. But the Third Circuit Court of Appeals has held that Viacom's data collection on the Nickelodeon website was highly offensive because the privacy policy may have deceptively caused parents to allow their young children to use Nick.com, thinking it was not collecting their personal information.

==== The press ====
The First Amendment "does not immunize the press from torts or crimes committed in an effort to gather news." But the press is given more latitude to intrude on seclusion to gather important information, so many actions that would be considered "highly offensive" if performed by a private citizen may not be considered offensive if performed by a journalist in the "pursuit of a socially or politically important story."

== See also ==
- Cohen v. Cowles Media Co. (1991)
- False light
- Personality rights
