= Robert Hatten =

Robert R. Hatten is an American regionally prominent trial attorney specializing in asbestos. He litigates mostly in Newport News, Virginia.

== Cases ==
Hatten's firm Patten, Wornom, Hatten & Diamonstein handles most of the asbestos injury cases in the Newport News region.

=== Exxon ===
In March 2011, a jury in Newport News awarded about $25 million to a former shipyard worker named Rubert Minton. Minton had worked on 17 different Exxon tankers over the course of his career. Decades later he began to suffer from mesothelioma. He filed suit against Exxon in 2009. Minton's lead attorney was Robert R. Hatten. Hatten said the award would be reduced to about $17.5 million because the $12.5 million in punitive damages awarded by the jury exceeded the $5 million that had been demanded by Minton.

== Controversy ==
Newport News has been named a "judicial hellhole" by the American Tort Reform Association for supposedly favoring plaintiffs over defendants. Hatten has consistently defended the practices of the Newport News Circuit Court. In one notable op-ed he wrote, "Newport News judges have been faithfully following the law, not making it, and not tilting it. These judges are neither plaintiff friendly nor business friendly. They don't need friends in the courtroom — they need respect. [The head of ATRA] owes them a public apology for impugning their integrity."

Hatten was featured prominently in the documentary UnSettled as spokesman for the asbestos plaintiff's bar.

== Public service ==
Hatten was appointed to Christopher Newport University's Board of Visitors on June 2, 2015, by Gov. Terry McAuliffe. He was voted as Rector of the board on September 24, 2018.

== Campaign donations ==
Patten, Wornom, Hatten and Diamonstein, Robert Hatten's law firm, gave $500 to Gary Anderson, a candidate for Circuit Court Clerk in Newport News in 2017. In 2016, Hatten, along with Lindsey Carney and Alan Diamonstein, gave $2,090 in in-kind services to Mike Mullin, a candidate for Newport News city council.
