= Fenton v Thorley =

Fenton v. Thorley
- Citation: [1903] WN 149
- Transcript: judgment

Fenton v. Thorley [1903] WN 149 is an English tort law case from the House of Lords, which deals with the definition of an "accident".

"'Accident' is used in the ordinary sense and means a mishap or untoward event not expected or designed."

== See also ==
- Tort reform
- Accident Compensation Corporation
