= The Rise and Fall of Freedom of Contract =

1979 law history book by Patrick Atiyah

The Rise and Fall of Freedom of Contract (1979) is a legal-historical text on the changes in the concept of freedom of contract by English Professor Patrick Atiyah. It was published by the Oxford University Press, and a paperback edition was released in 1985.

== Summary ==
The central theme is that the notion of a contract based on consent (or a "meeting of minds") was almost entirely absent before 1800 in the law. Instead it was based on reliance or the receipt of a benefit. You could revoke a promise, and the concept of an executory contract was unknown. Moreover, courts were more concerned with the fairness of an exchange, and not concerned merely to uphold promises or the parties' will. Damages reflected that, only being for the value of exchange, not the loss of a bargain.

Then, after 1800, the concept of contractual freedom "rose". Promises and the "intentions" of parties "became the paradigm of contract theory". Atiyah argues that it began with the notion of freedom of property, summed up in the phrase of Sir Edward Coke in Semayne's case that every man's home is his castle. Following that was the transition from a property to a contract based society.

After 1900, however, freedom of contract had had its heyday. Atiyah illustrates how the growth of consumer protection, rent and employment legislation has moved contract back into smaller confines, based on general notions of fairness.

== Contents ==
- 1 Introduction
- Part I The Beginnings of Freedom of Contract: The Story to 1770
  - 2 The Condition of England in 1770
  - 3 The Intellectual Background in 1770–I
  - 4 The Intellectual Background in 1770–II
  - 5 The Legal Background in 1770
  - 6 Contract Law and Theory in 1770–I
  - 7 Contract Law and Theory in 1770–II
- Part II The Age of Freedom of Contract, 1770–1870
  - 8 The Condition of England, 1770–1870
  - 9 The Role of Government, 1770–1870
  - 10 The Role of the Individual, 1770–1870
  - 11 The Intellectual Background, 1770–1870–I
  - 12 The Intellectual Background, 1770–1870–II
  - 13 The Legal Background, 1770–1870
  - 14 Freedom of Contract in the Courts, 1770–1870–I
  - 15 Freedom of Contract in the Courts, 1770–1870–II
  - 16 Freedom of Contract in Parliament, 1770–1870
- Part III The Decline and Fall of Freedom of Contract, 1870–1970
  - 17 The Condition of England, 1870–1970
  - 18 The Intellectual Background, 1870–1970–I
  - 19 The Intellectual Background, 1870–1970–II
  - 20 The Legal Background, 1870–1970
  - 21 The Decline of Freedom of Contract, 1870–1970
  - 22 The Wheel Come Full Circle

== See also ==
- Atiyah's Accidents, Compensation and the Law (1970), now (2006) and updated by Peter Cane
- Just price
