= Charlie Ross (Mississippi politician) =

American politician

Member of the Mississippi Senate from the 20th district
- In office November 21, 1997 – January 8, 2008
- Preceded by: Mike Gunn
- Succeeded by: Lee Yancey

Member of the Mississippi House of Representatives from the 59th district
- In office January 7, 1997 – November 20, 1997
- Preceded by: Phil Bryant
- Succeeded by: Clayton Smith

Personal details
- Born: March 6, 1956 (age 70) Eupora, Mississippi
- Party: Republican
- Education: United States Air Force Academy (1978); Harvard Law School (1988)
- Profession: Attorney, politician

Military service
- Branch/service: Mississippi Air National Guard
- Battles/wars: Operation Desert Storm

Charlie Ross is an American politician and attorney who lives in Brandon, Mississippi. He served as Senator from District 20 in the Mississippi Senate until 2007. District 20 comprises parts of Madison and Rankin Counties. Ross was first elected to the Senate in 1997 after serving as the representative from District 59 in the Mississippi House of Representatives. Prior to his legislative service, he served as the Chairman of the Rankin County Republican Executive Committee. In 2008, Ross ran for Congress in Mississippi's 3rd congressional district, but was defeated in the primary by Rankin County Republican Chairman Gregg Harper.

== Education and military service ==
Ross grew up and attended high school in Eupora, Webster County, Mississippi. Ross is a 1978 graduate of the United States Air Force Academy, with a B.S. in economics. After the academy, he served on active duty as a fighter interceptor pilot. In 1991, he was activated and served as a C-141 pilot during Operation Desert Storm with the Mississippi Air National Guard. In 2007 the National Guard Association awarded Ross the Charles Dick Award.

== Legal career ==
In 1988 Charlie obtained his J.D., with honors, from Harvard Law School. Ross maintains a full law practice, concentrating on civil litigation. He is a shareholder in the Jackson law firm of Wise Carter Child and Caraway. He is admitted to practice before all Mississippi courts, the Fifth Circuit Court of Appeals and the U.S. Supreme Court.

== Mississippi State Senate ==
In the Mississippi Senate, Ross served as Chairman of the Judiciary A Committee, which handles a wide variety of legislative issues including civil justice matters. He also served on the Constitution, Elections, Environmental Protection, Executive Contingent Fund, Finance, Insurance, and the Veteran and Military Affairs committees.

=== Tort reform ===
In 2004, as Chairman of the Judiciary A Committee, Ross drafted the Comprehensive Tort Reform bill and was the leader in the Senate in the successful fight to pass the bill. Senator Merle Flowers (R-DeSoto) said, "Senator Charlie Ross’ leadership and knowledge of our civil justice system was crucial in the tort reform fight. Charlie knew what needed to be done, and he knew how to do it. Mississippi is fortunate to have a leader of his character and ability in the Senate."

The American Tort Reform Association (ATRA) presented Ross with the Civil Justice Achievement Award. Ross also served as the Public Sector Chairman of the Civil Justice Task Force of the American Legislative Exchange Council (ALEC), a national organization of state legislators and private sector members. In 2007, ALEC recognized Ross's legislative accomplishments by naming him Legislator of the Year. In 2007, the U.S. Chamber awarded Ross its Legislative Achievement Award.

== Personal life ==
Ross and his family live in Rankin County. He and his family are members of Lakeside Presbyterian Church, where he serves as a Sunday school teacher. Ross and his wife, Sharon, have three sons: Andy, David, and Steven.
