= Pearson v. Chung =

2007 lawsuit about dry-cleaning pants

- Court: Superior Court of the District of Columbia
- Full case name: Roy L. Pearson, Jr. v. Soo Chung, et al.
- Decided: June 25, 2007
- Citation: no. CA-4302-05 (Sup. Ct. D.C. June 25, 2007)

Case history
- Subsequent actions: Pearson v. Chung, et al., no. 07-CV-872 (D.C. App. Dec. 18, 2008)

Court membership
- Judge sitting: Judith Bartnoff

Pearson v. Chung, also known as the "$54 million pants" case, is a 2007 civil case decided in the Superior Court of the District of Columbia in which Roy Pearson, then an administrative law judge, sued his local dry cleaning establishment for $54 million in damages after the dry cleaners allegedly lost his pants.

On May 3, 2005, Pearson delivered a pair of gray pants to a local dry cleaning establishment in Washington, D.C. called Custom Cleaners, operated by Jin, Soo, and Ki Chung. When the pants were returned to him several days later, Pearson insisted that the pants he was presented with were not the pants he initially dropped off, and accused the Chungs of losing his pants. Pearson demanded to be compensated $1,000 by the Chungs, which Pearson claimed the pants to be worth, but the Chungs refused. In response, Pearson filed suit against the Chungs for inconvenience and mental distress, initially requesting $67 million in damages, though he later reduced the amount to $54 million.

The case went to trial on June 12, 2007. Representing himself pro se during the proceedings, Pearson argued that the Chungs had failed to fulfill the "Same Day Service" and "Satisfaction Guaranteed" promises posted outside their business. The Chungs argued that the signs could only be considered fraud if a reasonable person could be misled by them. Pearson lost the case and subsequent appeal. The Chungs made a motion to recover their legal fees, but withdrew it following the conclusion of a successful fundraising campaign.

The case drew international attention and has been held as an example of frivolous litigation and the need for tort reform in the United States.

== Lawsuit ==
=== Background ===
On May 3, 2005, Pearson delivered a pair of gray pants to a dry cleaning establishment in Washington, D.C. called Custom Cleaners to be altered. (Note: Throughout April and May 2005, Pearson brought several other suits and pairs of pants to Custom Cleaners, which were all returned without incident.) The establishment was owned collectively by Jin and Soo Chung, a married couple, and their son Ki Chung, all of whom had immigrated from South Korea and did not speak fluent English. The pants that Pearson delivered belonged to a blue and maroon suit that he owned, and were described by him as being gray with "blue and red stripes on them". Pearson requested his pants be ready for pickup two days later on May 5, which Soo Chung, who took his order, agreed to.

When Pearson returned on May 5 to pick up his pants, Soo Chung informed him that his pants were not ready and had been sent to another store they owned by mistake. Soo Chung promised to have them ready the following morning, but when Pearson returned on May 6, the pants "still had not been located". Soo Chung asked Pearson to return the following day. Pearson returned the next morning on May 7, where the Chungs presented him with a pair of charcoal gray pants. Pearson insisted that the pants were not his, contrary to the dry cleaner's records, tags, and his receipt, and refused to accept them. Pearson demanded what he claimed to be the price of the pants as compensation, an amount of over $1,000, which the Chungs refused. As a result, Pearson filed suit in the District of Columbia's Superior Court. The judge to whom the case was presented decided to bring it to trial on the basis of two of Pearson's claims. The first claim was the issue of the ownership by Pearson of the presented pair of pants. The second claim was on the issue of signs posted outside the business, advertising "Same Day Service" and "Satisfaction Guaranteed", which Pearson claimed to be misleading.

The Chungs were reportedly considering moving back to South Korea. After an outpouring of support for the Chungs from members of the public, a website was set up to accept donations for the Chungs' legal defense.

On May 30, 2007, Pearson reduced his demands to $54 million in damages rather than $67 million. Among his requests were $500,000 in attorney's fees, $2 million for "discomfort, inconvenience, and mental distress", and $15,000 which he claimed would be the cost to rent a car every weekend to drive to another dry cleaning service. The remaining $51.5 million would be used to help similarly dissatisfied D.C. consumers sue businesses. Pearson also re-focused his lawsuit from the missing pants to the removal of window signs for "Satisfaction Guaranteed" and "Same Day Service". Pearson claimed the signs represented fraud on the part of the Chungs. The Chungs' lawyer, Christopher Manning, alleged that the signs could only be considered fraud if a reasonable person would be misled by them, and that a reasonable person would not see the signs as an unconditional promise. The Chungs' lawyer portrayed Pearson as a bitter, financially insolvent man; under questioning, Pearson admitted that, at the start of the court case, he had only $1000–2000 in the bank due to divorce proceedings, and was collecting unemployment benefits.

=== Trial ===
The trial heard opening arguments on June 12, 2007, with Pearson representing himself pro se and the Chungs being represented by attorney Chris Manning. The trial drew a "standing-room-only" crowd. Pearson broke down in tears during an explanation about his frustration after losing his pants, and a short recess had to be declared.

=== Decision ===
On June 25, 2007, the trial ended with District of Columbia Superior Court Judge Judith Bartnoff ruling in favor of the dry cleaners, and awarding them court costs pursuant to a motion which the Chungs later withdrew. The court took judicial notice of Pearson's divorce proceedings, where he was sanctioned $12,000 by the trial court for "creating unnecessary litigation and threatening both his wife and her lawyer with disbarment".

=== Post-trial motions and appeal ===
Pearson made a motion on July 11, 2007, to reconsider in the trial court, stating that he felt the judge had "committed a fundamental legal error", and had failed to address his legal claims. Pearson stated he believed the court had imposed its own conditional interpretation of "satisfaction guaranteed", rather than what Pearson believes is an offer of unconditional and unambiguous satisfaction. The court denied the motion.

It was revealed on August 2, 2007, that a panel recommended Pearson not be given a ten-year term as an administrative law judge after his initial two-year term expired mid-2007, in part because his suit against Mr. Chung demonstrated a lack of "judicial temperament". Pearson was appointed in 2005 and stood to lose his $100,512 salary if a hearing upheld that decision. On October 22, a D.C. commission voted against reappointing Pearson to the bench of the Office of Administrative Hearings. On November 14, it was confirmed that Pearson had lost his job by not being affirmed for an extension.

Roy Pearson filed suit against Washington, D.C., on May 2, 2008, claiming that he had been wrongfully dismissed for exposing corruption within the Office of Administrative Hearings. Pearson sought $1 million in compensation for lost wages and punitive damages as well as his job back. On July 23, 2009, federal district judge Ellen Segal Huvelle dismissed Pearson's May 2008 lawsuit, ruling the District of Columbia had not broken the law by declining to reappoint him as an administrative law judge. Pearson had maintained in the suit that the failure to reappoint him to the ten-year term was in part intended as retaliation for his suit against the dry cleaners. Pearson lost his appeal when the D.C. Circuit ruled against him on May 27, 2010.

The Chungs moved to recover $83,000 in attorneys' fees and to impose sanctions, but withdrew the motion after recovering their costs through fund-raising. The Chungs stated that they did so in the hopes of persuading Pearson to stop litigating, but on August 14, 2007, Pearson filed a notice of appeal.

On September 10, 2008, Pearson filed an appeal to the District of Columbia Court of Appeals, where oral argument was held on October 22, 2008, before a three-judge panel consisting of judges Phyllis Thompson, Noel Anketell Kramer, and Michael W. Farrell. Manning represented the Chungs on the appeal pro bono, and Pearson represented himself pro se. On December 18, 2008, the panel that heard Pearson's appeal announced that they were rejecting it. According to The Washington Post, "Pearson has two remaining avenues of appeal left: He could ask the entire nine-judge appellate court to review the case, or ask the U.S. Supreme Court to weigh in." On January 6, 2009, Pearson filed a petition with the D.C. Court of Appeals, requesting the case be reheard en banc by the full nine-judge court. On March 2, 2009, the appeals court denied the petition. Pearson's final option was to ask the U.S. Supreme Court to hear the case.

=== Disciplinary action ===
DC Board of Professional Responsibility issued a 90-day suspension from legal practice against Pearson for engaging in frivolous litigation and thereby interfering with the administration of justice. The District of Columbia Court of Appeals upheld the suspension in June 2020, observing that Pearson had continued his intransigent behavior even during the misconduct proceedings. Pearson retained his DC bar membership.

== Cultural impact ==
The unusual circumstances of this case led The Wall Street Journal, The Washington Post, and dozens of bloggers to refer to it as "The Great American Pants Suit", and to Pearson as "Judge Fancy Pants". Pearson was named #4 in the list of the Overall Stella Awards Winners by the True Stella Awards, after being the Stella Awards winner for the year 2007. The case has garnered considerable international attention. BBC News quoted Chris Manning, attorney for the Chung family, as saying that the experience for the Chungs has become the "American nightmare"—an ironic reference to the American Dream. Fortune magazine listed the case at #37 in its "101 Dumbest Moments in Business" of 2007. Cracked.com listed the case as "Exhibit 1" in its 2008 article "9 Insane Cases that Prove the US Legal System Is Screwed".

On July 24, 2007, the American Tort Reform Association and the Institute for Legal Reform of the United States Chamber of Commerce hosted a fundraiser for the Chungs to help pay their attorneys fees that reported having raised up to $64,000. The Chungs say they have received close to $100,000 from supporters to cover their attorneys' fees and lost business.

On September 19, 2007, citing a loss of revenue and emotional strain from the lawsuit, the Chungs announced they had closed and sold the dry cleaning shop involved in the dispute, choosing instead to direct their time and resources on running their other remaining store.

The incident and lawsuit served as the basis for "Bottomless", an episode of Law & Order's 18th season, which aired in 2008.

== See also ==
- Vexatious litigation – Legal action which is brought solely to harass or subdue an adversary
