= Lee Yancey =

American politician

Member of the Mississippi House of Representatives from the 74th district
- Incumbent
- Assumed office January 7, 2020
- Preceded by: Mark Baker

Member of the Mississippi Senate from the 20th district
- In office January 8, 2008 – January 3, 2012
- Preceded by: Charlie Ross
- Succeeded by: Josh Harkins

Personal details
- Born: Jeremy Lewayne Yancey; July 29, 1968 (age 58) Ripley, Mississippi, U.S.
- Party: Republican
- Spouse: Courtney Fagan
- Education: Mississippi College
- Profession: Investment Advisor

Jeremy Lee Yancey (born July 29, 1968) is an American politician in Mississippi. He is currently a member of the Mississippi House of Representatives from the 74th district.

== Early life ==
Lee Yancey was born in Ripley, Mississippi, the son of Rex Yancey, a Southern Baptist pastor, and Ellon Yancey, a retired public schoolteacher. Yancey says he is an eighth generation Mississippian.. During his childhood, Yancey lived in Ripley, Tupelo, Pascagoula and Quitman. He graduated from Quitman High School in 1986, where he was selected Mr. Quitman High School and lettered in six sports. Yancey earned a B.A. in religion from Mississippi College in 1991 and a Master in Divinity in Biblical Studies from New Orleans Baptist Theological Seminary in 1993. He earned a doctorate in leadership administration from New Orleans Baptist Theological Seminary several years later.

== Career ==
=== Ministerial staffer ===
From 1987 to 2000, Yancey served on ministerial staffs in various churches. In 1996, Yancey became Associate Pastor at the First Baptist Church in Meridian.

=== Lobbyist for Southern Baptist Convention ===
From 2000 to 2007, Yancey was a lobbyist for the Southern Baptist Convention. Yancey was a member of the Christian Action Commission, he spoke out in support of a covenant marriage bill. and against abortion. He worked with legislators to support the anti-abortion cause on the issues of therapeutic cloning, embryonic stem-cell research, sonogram, and abortion ban legislation. Yancey was named one of two 2006 Pro-Lifers of the year.

Yancey was a member of the Rankin County Republican Executive Committee from 2002 to 2006 and served as a campaign volunteer in the successful re-election campaign of Lieutenant Governor Amy Tuck. He was also President of the Choose Life Car Tag Committee.

=== Woodridge Capital Portfolio Management ===
Shortly after becoming State Senator, Yancey joined Woodridge Capitol Portfolio Management, serving in the area of business development. He holds a Series 65 license.

== Political career ==
=== 2007 state senate campaign ===
Yancey announced he would run for State Senate District 20, which covers portions of Rankin County and Madison County, Mississippi Madison County. The incumbent, Charlie Ross, was not running for re-election, opting instead to run for Lieutenant Governor. In the primary, Yancey faced Robert (Bobby) Blake, a publishing company owner; Harvey Dallas; and Charles Porter, a construction company owner. In the GOP primary, Porter led 34.9 percent to Yancey's 28.6 percent. Yancey obtained endorsements from Blake and Dallas. In the run-off, Yancey won with 50.7 percent. Yancey gained attention for his use of social media, including a promotional rap video. He faced no Democratic opposition in the general election.

=== State senator ===
Yancey took office in January 2008. He is the Vice-Chair of the Highways and Transportation committee. Yancey authored a bill making it illegal to use cellular telephones while operating a motor vehicle and to send text messages. The bill died in committee.

In the 2008 legislative session, Yancey co-authored a bill with State Senator Michael Watson and State Senator Chris McDaniel making it a felony for undocumented workers to accept a job in Mississippi. Yancey signed on to legislation requiring the removal of school superintendents in underperforming school districts.

In the 2009 legislative session, Yancey was the principal author of two bills that passed: a bill allow state agencies to electronically transmit annual reports and a bill authorizing the University Medical Center to donate surplus food.

In the 2010 legislative session, Yancey co-sponsored legislation with State Senator Michael Watson and State Senator Chris McDaniel to create a new start school program in failing school districts.

In the most recent session, Yancey co-sponsored Nathan's Law with State Senator Chris McDaniel, a bill increasing the penalty for unlawful passing of a school bus. Yancey also authored a bill to prohibit the expansion of casino gaming in Mississippi. The bill died in committee. He also authored a bill to amend the Mississippi constitution to prohibit abortions. That bill also died in committee.

In 2009, he co-sponsored a bill to require random nicotine testing of Medicaid recipients. That bill died in committee.

Yancey voted against a cigarette tax. "Raising the tax on cigarettes only increases the size of government and it doesn't solve the cigarette problem. If you raise the cigarette tax you might as well raise the soft drink tax or potato chip tax because they are bad for you, and where do you draw the line," he said.

Yancey has referred to himself and fellow GOP freshman Senators Chris McDaniel of Ellisville and Michael Watson of Pascagoula as "The Three Amigos".

=== 2011 state treasurer campaign ===
Yancey said General Harold Cross "planted a seed in my head" about running for Treasurer in Summer 2010. Describing himself as "one of the few fiscal conservatives in the senate and the house," Yancey was spurred to run for Treasurer "out of a sense of growing frustration being in the Mississippi Senate" and out of concern "about the direction our state is going financially." In January 2010, Yancey announced he would run for State Treasurer. "I'm not a politician, I'm a child of God. I look at public service as a calling and I didn't want to look back with regret for something I felt the Lord was calling me to do," Yancey said.

In the Republican primary on August 2, 2011, Yancey faced Lynn Fitch, then head of the State Personnel Board, and Lucien Smith, a former budget advisor to Governor Haley Barbour in the GOP Primary. Yancey received endorsements from President of the American Family Association Donald Wildmon, the Mississippi Federation for Immigration Reform and Enforcement, and U.S. Congressman Gregg Harper. No candidate received a majority, but Fitch and Yancey polled the highest, with 37.65% and 33.45% respectively.

A runoff election was held August 23, 2011, involving only Fitch and Yancey. Yancey was defeated, with 73,076 votes to Fitch's 82,930.

=== State House of Representatives ===
In 2019, Yancey successfully ran for the Mississippi House of Representatives receiving 77.36% of the vote.

== Family and personal life ==
In 1992, Yancey married Courtney Fagan. They have two children.Yancey and his family reside in Brandon. Yancey's father-in-law, Julian Fagan, was a punter for the New Orleans Saints.

Yancey is a member of Bay Springs Baptist Church. He is also a marathon runner.
