= American Council of Engineering Companies =

American Council of Engineering Companies (ACEC)
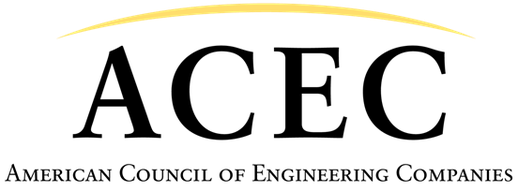
- Formation: 1905; 121 years ago
- Type: Business association
- Headquarters: Washington, D.C.
- Members: 5,400 member firms, representing 660,000 member firm employees
- President/CEO: Linda Bauer Darr
- Staff: 42
- Website: www.acec.org

The American Council of Engineering Companies (ACEC) is a business association representing private engineering firms in the United States. Founded in 1905, it operates as a federation of 51 state and regional member councils, with headquarters in Washington, D.C. ACEC member firms collectively employ hundreds of thousands of engineers and design professionals and contribute to the design of a substantial portion of U.S. infrastructure, including transportation systems, water and wastewater facilities, energy infrastructure, and public buildings.

ACEC represents private-sector engineering firms before the U.S. Congress and federal agencies on issues such as federal procurement, infrastructure funding, tax policy, professional liability, and workforce development. Unlike professional societies such as the American Society of Civil Engineers (ASCE) and the National Society of Professional Engineers (NSPE), which represent individual engineers, ACEC's members are engineering firms. ACEC provides educational programs and other resources related to the business operations and management needs of member firms.

== History ==
ACEC traces its roots to the Association of Architectural Engineers, founded in New York City in 1905 to promote the business interests of consulting engineers. The organization, which was based on individual memberships, changed its name to the American Institute of Consulting Engineers (AICE) in 1909. Similar organizations soon sprung up in many states. In 1930, notable member Blake R. Van Leer lobbied congress for a National Museum of Engineering and Industry.

In 1956, representatives from 10 state associations created a national Consulting Engineers Council (CEC), representing engineering firms rather than individuals. By 1960, CEC had grown to 29 state member organizations, representing more than 1,000 firms.

In 1973, CEC and AICE merged to create the American Consulting Engineers Council (ACEC). To accommodate the individual members of AICE, the new organization created a College of Fellows membership category.

ACEC's advocacy activities covered a broad range of issues, sometimes necessitating the creation of spin-off groups to pursue specific goals. For example, in 1986, ACEC founded the American Tort Reform Association (ATRA) to lobby for the reform of unfair liability statutes nationwide.

In 2000, ACEC changed its name to the American Council of Engineering Companies to reflect both its firm-based membership and the increasingly diversified and multi-disciplinary nature of engineering practices, including design-build practices.

In 2006, President George W. Bush gave a major mid-term address at the ACEC Annual Convention in Washington, D.C., recognizing the organization for its public policy advocacy.

In 2012, along with the American Public Works Association (APWA) and American Society of Civil Engineers (ASCE), ACEC founded the Institute for Sustainable Infrastructure (ISI), which has developed the Envision® sustainability rating system for infrastructure works.

In May 2022, ACEC opened the doors to its new office located at 1400 L Street, NW in Washington, replacing the council's longstanding former office location at 1015 15th Street, NW.

In 2023, ACEC joined with industry peers the American Public Works Association (APWA) and the American Society of Civil Engineers (ASCE) to launch the Engineering and Public Works Roadshow. The Roadshow is an effort to draw public attention to the essentiality of engineering to society and to promote the growth of the engineering workforce.

== Publications ==
ACEC publishes Engineering Inc., an online magazine focusing on engineering business issues.

Last Word is the council's weekly online membership newsletter which draws from the council's regularly published blog.

The "Tuesday Letter" e-mail communication from the ACEC CEO's office.

Regular sector-specific Private Market Briefs on the following markets: Commercial and Residential Real Estate, Educational, Energy and Utilities, Health Care & Science + Technology, and Intermodal and Logistics.

The Engineers Joint Contract Document Committee (EJCDC) is a collaboration of ACEC, ASCE, and the National Society of Professional Engineers (NSPE) to develop and disseminate standard contract documents for use in design and construction projects.

The Engineering Influence podcast.

== Conferences ==
ACEC hosts two conferences per year. Each spring, the ACEC Annual Convention and Legislative Summit is held in Washington, D.C., featuring political speakers and member visits to congressional offices, as well as business education.

The ACEC Fall Conference is held in different locations each year and focuses on business practice issues, markets, and political developments.

ACEC also holds an annual meeting of its Coalitions.

== Awards Programs ==
- Engineering Excellence Awards—Introduced in 1967, the Engineering Excellence Awards (EEA) program annually honors outstanding engineering accomplishments.
- Community Service Awards—Given annually to member firm principals who have made outstanding contributions to the quality of life in their community.
- Distinguished Award of Merit—The council's highest award, given to individuals for exemplary achievement. Recipients include former Presidents Dwight D. Eisenhower and Herbert Hoover, General Lucius Clay, Admiral Hyman G. Rickover, Carl Sagan, W. Edwards Deming, and Neil Armstrong.
- QBS Awards Program—Co-sponsored with NSPE, the QBS Awards recognize public and private entities that make exemplary use of the qualifications-based selection (QBS) process at the state and local levels.
- Young Professional of the Year Award—This award promotes the accomplishments of young engineers by highlighting their engineering contributions and the resulting impact on society.
- ACEC also awards student scholarships annually through the ACEC Research Institute.
