= Joint and several liability =

Legal term

Where two or more persons are liable in respect of the same liability, in most common law legal systems they may either be:

- severally liable, or
- jointly liable, or
- jointly and severally liable.

== Several liability ==
In several or proportionate liability, parties are liable only for their own obligations.

Example: AnyBank and AnotherBank join as a syndicate to lend to Credit-Hungry Industries, Inc. The agreement provides that each bank is severally liable for its own part of the loan. AnyBank fails to advance its agreed part of the loan: Credit-Hungry can sue only AnyBank, and AnotherBank has no liability.

== Joint liability ==
If parties have joint liability, each of them is liable up to the full amount of the relevant obligation.

Example: Alex and Bobbie are married. Together they take a loan from a bank and the loan agreement specifies that they are to be jointly liable for the full amount. Alex moves overseas and ceases to make payments. The bank is entitled to sue Bobbie for the full amount.

However the creditor has only one cause of action; i.e., they can sue for each debt only once. If the claim fails against one party, the bank cannot go on to sue any of the others.

Example: As the bank couldn't locate Alex, he wasn't served with the claim, and so only Bobbie was party to the action. The court gives judgment against her, but the bank finds she cannot pay. Even if Alex later returns to the jurisdiction, or with more vigorous efforts can be found overseas and served effectively, the bank cannot seek to recover anything from him: the claim has already been determined (it is "res judicata").

== Joint and several liability ==
Under joint and several liability or (in the U.S.) all sums, a plaintiff (claimant) is entitled to claim an obligation incurred by any of the promisors from all of them jointly and also from each of them individually. Thus the plaintiff has more than one cause of action: if she pursues one promisor and he fails to pay the sum due, her action is not exhausted and she can pursue a second promisor, and so on.

Example: Annie leases a property to three students, Bertie, Charlie and Danny, who agree to be jointly and severally liable. Bertie disappears and ceases to pay his rent. Annie can sue each of Bertie, Charlie, and Danny separately ("severally") for the rent owing.

As far as the promisee is concerned, each promisor is liable for all sums due from any of his co-promisors. However, as between themselves, any one of them who pays more than his fair share is entitled to recover it from the party who is 'really' liable.

== Arguments for and against joint and several liability ==
In contracts, there is usually no controversy over joint and several liability: each party gets what they bargained for. But in tort, the common law position has sometimes been challenged.

A plaintiff may recover all the damages from any of the defendants regardless of their individual share of the liability. The rule is often applied in negligence cases, though it is sometimes invoked in other areas of law.

The Law Commission of New Zealand summarises the issue nicely:

"The issue primarily turns on who is the most appropriate party to bear the risk of non-recovery. Should it be the plaintiff, in which case a proportionate model will be a fairer or efficient model of allocating risk? Should it be the liable defendants, in which case joint and several liability will be an efficient way of allocating risk?"

Joint and several liability is premised on the theory that the defendants are in the best position to apportion damages amongst themselves. Once liability has been established and damages awarded, the defendants are free to litigate amongst themselves to better divide liability. The plaintiff no longer needs to be involved in the litigation and can avoid the cost of continuing litigation.

- As each defendant has contributed to a single result, the injury of the plaintiff, although there may be differences in the character or scope of their duties, it may be argued that their joint contribution to the single result prevents any reasonable division of the damages.
- Although one defendant may end up paying more than that defendant tortfeasor's proportionate share of the damages, it is nonetheless thought that it is better for a culpable defendant to overpay that defendant's share of the damages than for the injured plaintiff to be undercompensated for the injury.

Where a financially wealthy party can be named or joined as a defendant, a plaintiff has a greater chance of recovering damages than when the defendants have very limited economic resources or are financially insolvent, or "judgment-proof". Opponents of the principle of joint and several liability argue that its use is unfair to many defendants.

- Joint and several liability will lead to cases in which a party who has a very small share of the responsibility for a plaintiff's injury may unfairly shoulder the burden of paying all of the damages.
- When defendants may be held jointly liable, the plaintiff may seek out a defendant with considerable resources ("deep pockets") to add to a case, hoping that the defendant will be found to be even 1% to 2% liable for the injury and thus be obligated to pay the entire judgment.

For example, where an uninsured drunk driver causes an accident that results in injury, the plaintiff may sue an additional defendant, along with the drunk driver, such as suing the state highway department alleging that a highway defect contributed to the accident, hoping that the additional defendant will be found partly responsible.

== Variations from common law ==
In the United States, 46 of the 50 states have a rule of joint and several liability, although in response to tort reform efforts, some have limited the applicability of the rule. About two dozen have reformed the rule, with several (Alaska, Arizona, Kansas, Utah, Vermont, Oklahoma, and Wyoming) abolishing it. In some instances it is abolished except where the defendants "act in concert".

Some US jurisdictions have imposed limits on joint and several liability, but without completely abolishing that doctrine. For example,

- In Ohio only defendants who are responsible for more than 50% of the tortious conduct can be held jointly and severally liable for economic losses. A defendant who bears responsibility for an injury but whose tortious conduct was less than 50% is only responsible for his or her share of the plaintiff's economic loss. Non-economic losses (such as pain and suffering or loss of companionship) can only be assigned proportionately.
- California allows joint and several liability but only for economic damages.
- Hawaii allows joint and several liability for all economic losses but only for non-economic losses when the underlying tort is intentional, related to environmental pollution or selected other classes.

=== Examples ===
If Ann is struck by a car driven by Bob, who was served alcohol in Charlotte's bar (and the state has dramshop laws), then both Bob and Charlotte's bar may be held jointly liable for Ann's injuries. If the jury determines Ann should be awarded $10 million and that Bob was 90% at fault and Charlotte's bar 10% at fault:

- Under several or proportionate liability, Bob would have to pay $9 million (90% of $10 million) and Charlotte's bar would have to pay $1 million (10% of $10 million). If Bob does not have any money and is uninsured, Ann will only recover whatever sum(s) Charlotte's bar and/or her insurance provider are able to pay - up to the limit of any liability insurance policy Charlotte may have (plus her own ability to pay, if any) or $1 million, whichever is less.
- Under joint liability, Ann may recover the full damages from either of the defendants. If Ann sued Charlotte's bar alone, Charlotte's bar would be liable for the full $10 million despite only being 10% at fault for the injury. If Charlotte's bar had an insurance policy with a liability limit of less than $10 million, the bar would remain liable for any amount over and above the policy limit. Charlotte would have to join Bob as defendant in Ann's suit against her.
- Under joint and several liability, if Charlotte's bar paid the full award of damages, Charlotte's bar could pursue a separate contribution action against Bob for $9 million. Regardless of the outcome of a contribution action, Charlotte's bar would remain liable to Ann for the full $10 million.

Joint and several liability can make a defendant liable for the full amount of damages suffered by a plaintiff even if that defendant bears only slight fault for the injury. For example, if a child is injured due to the negligence of a crossing guard employed by a school district, and a court finds the crossing guard to be 99% at fault for the child's injury and the school district to be only 1% at fault, the school district would be liable to pay 100% of the damages. In contrast, under several liability, if the crossing guard was unable to pay money toward the judgment the most that the injured child could recover would be 1% of the judgment from the school district.

== Microfinance ==
In trying to achieve its aim of alleviating poverty, microfinance often lends to a group of borrowers, with each member of the group jointly liable. That means that each member is responsible for ensuring that all the other members of the group repay too. If one member fails to repay, the members of the group are also held in default. Joint liability solves the information and enforcement problems associated with credit markets by encouraging screening, monitoring, costly state verification, and contract enforcement.

== See also ==
- Comparative fault
- Tort reform
- Solidary obligations, civil law equivalent
