= Patrick Atiyah =

English lawyer and academic (1931–2018)

Patrick Selim Atiyah QC FBA (5 March 1931 – 30 March 2018) was an English lawyer and legal scholar. He was best known for his work in the common law, particularly in the law of contract and for advocating reformation or abolition of the law of tort (tort reform). He was made a Fellow of the British Academy in 1979.

== Biography ==
Patrick Selim Atiyah was born on 5 March 1931. He was a son of the Lebanese writer Edward Atiyah and his Scottish wife Jean. The mathematician Sir Michael Atiyah was his older brother. As a child, Patrick lived in Sudan and Egypt. The family moved to England in 1945. Patrick attended secondary school at Woking County Grammar School for Boys and went on to read law at Magdalen College, Oxford.

Atiyah was professor of law at the Australian National University (1970–1973), at the University of Warwick (1973–1977) and professor of English law at the University of Oxford (1977–1988). He also was visiting Professor of Law at Harvard Law School (1982–1983).

He died on 30 March 2018.

== Bibliography ==
Books

- Essays on Contract (1986), Oxford University Press, Digital Reproduction available at Google Books (2001)
- Atiyah's Accidents, Compensation and the Law (1970), now (2006) and updated by Peter Cane
- The Rise and Fall of Freedom of Contract (1979) Oxford University Press
- Promises, Morals, and Law (1983) Oxford University Press
- Form and Substance in Anglo-American Law (1987).
- An Introduction to the Law of Contract (1995 5th Ed.) Clarendon Law Series, now updated by Stephen Smith.
- The Damages Lottery (1997) Hart Publishing.

Articles

- 'Economic Duress and the Overborne Will' (1982) 98 LQR 197. Atiyah argued that it was wrong to use the phrase 'coercion of the will' in the test for duress. Duress does not eliminate free choice, it just creates a choice between evils. What is wrong about a contract is not an absence of consent, but the wrongful nature of the threats used to bring about consent.

== See also ==
- Tort reform
