= Tort reform =

Legal reforms aimed at reducing tort litigation

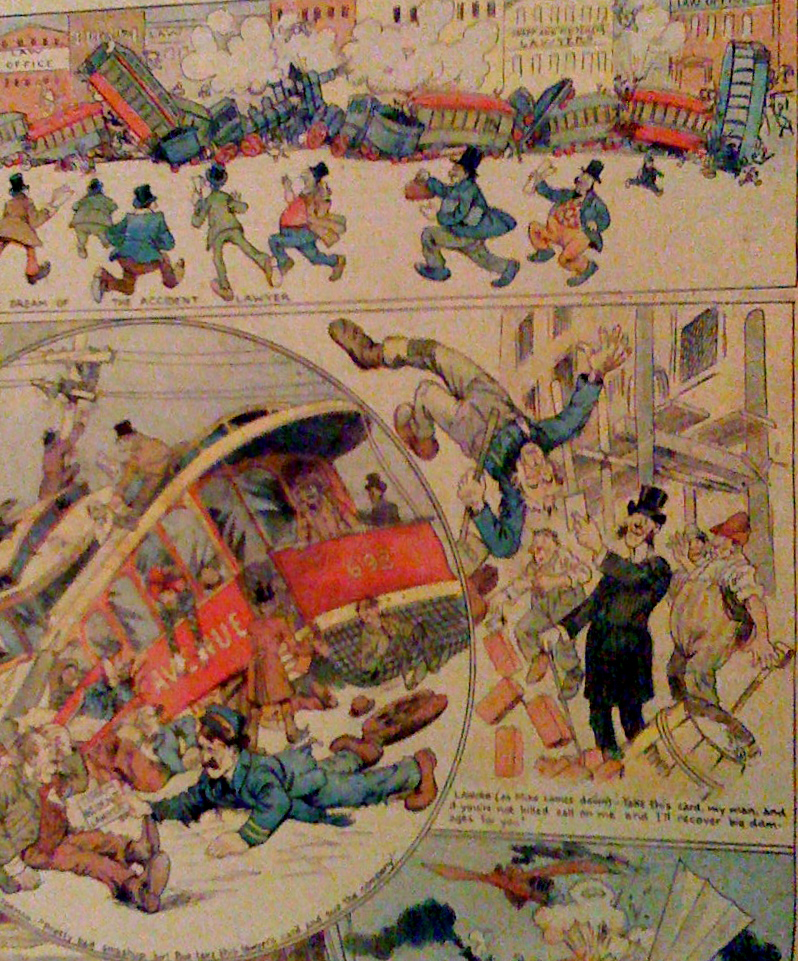
Lawyer jokes from 1900. Top-hatted lawyer to workman falling off scaffolding: "Take this card, my man, and if you're not killed call on me and I'll recover big damages for you."

Tort reform consists of changes in the civil justice system in common law countries that aim to reduce the ability of plaintiffs to bring tort litigation (particularly actions for negligence) or to reduce damages they can receive. Such changes are generally justified under the grounds that litigation is an inefficient means to compensate plaintiffs; that tort law permits frivolous or otherwise undesirable litigation to crowd the court system; or that the fear of litigation can serve to curtail innovation, raise the cost of consumer goods or insurance premiums for suppliers of services (e.g. medical malpractice insurance), and increase legal costs for businesses. Tort reform has primarily been prominent in common law jurisdictions, where criticism of judge-made rules regarding tort actions manifests in calls for statutory reform by the legislature.

== Background ==
Tort actions are civil claims for actions—not arising from a contract—that cause a claimant to suffer loss or harm, resulting in legal liability for the person who commits the tortious act. In common law jurisdictions, torts are primarily created through judicial precedent rather than legislation, and tort reform centers on proposals for legislation altering the precedent-based rules of tort law. Scholars and lawyers have identified conflicting aims for the law of tort, to some extent reflected in the different types of damages awarded by the courts: compensatory, aggravated, and punitive. British scholar Glanville Williams notes four possible bases on which different torts rested: appeasement, justice, deterrence and compensation. As a result of the wide range of rationales upon which the tort system is based and the variety of distinct purposes it aims to serve, criticism of tort law is generally targeted at its failure to achieve one or more of these aims. In particular, the inefficiency of tort law at securing fair and equal compensation for similarly situated plaintiffs and the uncertainty, cost, and complexity it creates for economic actors averse to lawsuits are motivating factors for tort reform advocates.

With regard to torts other than intentional torts, tort law is based on the principle of fault or negligence, requiring the party "at fault" for a particular harm to provide compensation, typically in the form of damages. Typical harms can include loss of income (while the person recovers); medical expenses; payment for pain, suffering, or even loss of a body part; or loss of future income (assuming that said loss can be proven to be reasonably likely to occur. See speculative damages). The classical purpose of tort is to provide full compensation for proved harm. This is known under the Latin phrase restitutio in integrum (restoration to original state). (Note: In other words, the idea underpinning the law of tort is that if someone harms someone else, they should make up for it. Compensation should be, in the words of Lord Blackburn in Livingstone v Rawyards Coal Co, "that sum of money which will put the party who has been injured in the same position as he would have been if he had not sustained the wrong for which he is now getting his compensation or reparation.") However, since the emphasis under tort law is on the violation by an individual of a purported duty of care, compensation is determined to a large extent by the extent to which the "at fault" party violated the applicable standard of care with regard to the plaintiff rather than solely by the harm purportedly suffered and distinguishes between negligent and intentional torts (e.g. negligent infliction of emotional distress vs intentional infliction of emotional distress). Consequently, compensation recoverable through tort suits vary even in circumstances where the injury itself is identical, especially when the "at fault" party is judgment proof or merely negligent rather than intentional in causing the purported harm. Consequently, some legal scholars propose to replace tort compensation with a social security framework that serves victims without respect to cause or fault. (Note: For instance, In 1972, New Zealand introduced the first universal no-fault insurance scheme for all accident victims, which provides benefit from the government-run Accident Compensation Corporation without respect to negligence. Its goal is to achieve equality of compensation, while reducing costs of litigation. In the 1970s, Australia and the United Kingdom drew up proposals for similar no-fault schemes but they were later abandoned.)

Proposals for tort reform primarily centre on addressing perceived deficits in four areas of tort law: personal injury lawsuits, medical malpractice, product liability, and defamation torts (i.e., libel, false light, and slander). Additionally, the emergence of absolute liability and constitutional torts in Indian tort law has become a focus of tort reform. While similar reforms may be proposed for all these areas of tort law, the debate surrounding each tends to remain separate, with the debate surrounding purported abuse of the defamation tort system generally discussed separately by policymakers addressing SLAPP lawsuits.

=== Defamation law ===
Defamation suits, particularly when brought by a large organisation or wealthy individual against a less wealthy critic, may serve to censor, intimidate, and silence critics by burdening them with the cost of a legal defence until they abandon their criticism or opposition. As a result, many jurisdictions (especially in North America) have enacted legislation incorporating elements of common tort reform proposals specifically with regard to lawsuits brought against individuals purportedly exercising freedom of speech. The California Code of Civil Procedure and Ontario's Protection of Public Participation Act do so by enabling defendants to make a special motion to strike or dismiss which, if successful, would terminate the lawsuit and allow the party to recover its legal costs from the plaintiff. Another concern with defamation torts is alleged forum shopping by plaintiffs who seek out jurisdictions with harsher defamation laws and little connection to either the plaintiff, the respondent, or the particular instance of alleged defamation. In response to this trend, the United States adopted the SPEECH Act which expressly limits the enforceability of offshore judgements in defamation cases.

Over the course of the twentieth and twenty first century, tort reform in the area of defamation law has resulted in an expansion of defences, including affirmative defences, available to defendants. For instance, the United Kingdom's Defamation Act 1952 and Singapore's Defamation Act 1957 both provide that if a defendant relying on the truth of a purportedly defamatory statement as an affirmative defence is only successful in proving the truth of part of the allegedly defamatory statement, the defence may still be available if the charges not proved do not materially injure the reputation of the plaintiff. Similarly, while there is no corresponding provision in India, Indian courts treat this principle as persuasive precedent.

=== Medical malpractice ===
Tort reform advocates argue that by limiting the threat of frivolous lawsuits, the medical industry would migrate away from practising defensive medicine. This would reduce the number of unnecessary tests and procedures, typically performed under patient request, thereby reducing the costs of medical care in general. As an argument against the current system, tort reformers link the rising costs of premiums for physicians' medical malpractice insurance to the rising cost of personal and group policy health insurance coverage. California's Medical Injury Compensation Reform Act has been cited as a model for tort reform in health care. Others deny that medical malpractice suits play a significant role in the cost of health care. Including legal fees, insurance costs, and payouts, the cost of all US malpractice suits comes to less than one-half of 1 per cent of health-care spending. Other recent research suggests that malpractice pressure makes hospitals more efficient, not less so: "The recent focus by the American Medical Association and physicians about the dramatic increases in medical malpractice insurance premiums, and their suggestion of a cap on non-economic damages, deserves a closer look. According to Baicker and Chandra (2004), increases in premiums are not affected by past or present malpractice payments, but may increase due to other unrelated factors. Chandra, Nundy, and Seabury (2005) find that the rising cost of medical services may explain the bulk of the growth of "compensatory awards". They also find that the greatest ten per cent of the malpractice payments have grown at a smaller pace than the average payment for the years 1991 and 2003. This means that the "medical malpractice crisis" is not necessarily fueled by the growth in malpractice payments. Furthermore, malpractice pressure actually forces our hospitals to be technically more efficient. This implies that existence of the medical malpractice system is beneficial, and its strength should not be diluted by either putting caps on non-economic damages or by decreasing the statute of limitations." Some say that federal licensing is a better approach and a strong central regulatory body is the answer to deal with negligent physicians who cross state lines.

According to economist Reed Neil Olsen, "tort law generally and medical malpractice specifically serve two legitimate purposes. First, the law serves to compensate victims for their losses. Second, the threat of liability serves to deter future accidents." Tort reformers maintain that the present tort system is an expensive and inefficient way to compensate those injured.

According to a 2004 study of medical malpractice costs, "program administration—defence and underwriting costs—accounts for approximately 60 per cent of total malpractice costs, and only 50 per cent of total malpractice costs are returned to patients. These costs are high even when compared with other tort-based systems, such as automobile litigation or airplane crashes, that determine fault and compensate victims. Moreover, most patients that receive negligent care never receive any compensation. The Harvard Medical Practice Study found that only one malpractice claim was filed for every eight negligent medical injuries." Of the legal changes proposed by tort reformers, this study found that states capping payouts and restricting non-economic damages saw an average decrease of 17.1% in malpractice insurance premiums. However, more recent research provided by the insurance industry to the publication Medical Liability Monitor indicated that medical malpractice insurance rates had declined for four straight years. The decrease was seen in both states that had enacted tort reform and in states that had not, leading actuaries familiar with the data to suggest that patient safety and risk management campaigns had had a more significant effect. Similarly, Klick/Stratman (2005) found that capping economic damages saw an increase in doctors per capita.

There is no guarantee, however, that any savings from tort reform would be efficiently distributed. Tort reform in Texas during the 1990s created $600 million in savings for insurance companies while the fraction of policy dollars needed to cover losses fell from 70.1 cents in losses in 1993 to 58.2 cents in 1998. Opponents of these liability-limiting measures contend that insurance premiums are only nominally reduced, if at all, in comparison to savings for insurance companies. Further, opponents claim that parties are still being injured at similar or higher rates, due to malpractice not being deterred by tort claims and the attraction of lower quality physicians to "tort reformed" states.

In Texas, tort reform measures have imposed a requirement in medical malpractice cases that only a physician practising or teaching in the same specialty as the defendant can serve as an expert witness in the matter. Additionally, a report from that witness showing evidence of negligence must be filed with the court within 120 days of the filing of the case. Failure to do so results in liability for the defendant's legal fees. Filing an action but failing to find a suitable expert or failure to file adequate reports within the time frame provided can result in hardship for a plaintiff who may already be crippled by physical injuries and bankrupted by medical fees.

=== Absolute liability ===
In Indian tort law, the principle of absolute liability provides that "where an enterprise is engaged in a hazardous or inherently dangerous activity", the enterprise has an absolute and unrestricted obligation to provide compensation any harm caused in any way by the activity. Unlike the related doctrine of strict liability applied to product liability litigation, absolute liability does not defences such as mistake of fact, force majeure, or a third party's mistake. Consequently, it creates legal uncertainty as it enables unpredictable events to give rise to liability. The strictness of this approach, under which even acts of God are not recognised as a defence, is severely criticised especially since it disregards the "generally accepted parameter of minimum competence and reasonable care" and endangers the growth of science and technical industries, as investors have to take the risk of liability given that there is no defence to the rule.

=== Product liability ===
A large portion of the debate surrounding tort reform focuses on product liability. In most common law jurisdictions and in member states of the European Union, the doctrine of strict liability applies. Proponents of tort reform argue that liability serves to increase the cost of goods for customers and that it serves to encourage regulation through litigation. Opponents of tort reform argue that it would negatively impact public safety. Conversely, proponents of tort reform argue that strict liability creates risk of moral hazard as it may cause consumers to under-invest in care and disregard product safety prior to making a purchase. Furthermore, requiring manufacturers to internalise costs they would otherwise externalise increases the price of goods and, in elastic, price-sensitive markets, price increases cause some consumers to seek substitutes for that product. As a result, manufacturers may not produce the socially optimal level of goods.

In law and economics literature, there is consequently a debate as to whether liability and regulation are substitutes or complements and thus whether the enforcement of predictable regulation known to manufacturers in advance can adequately assure consumer safety while providing greater legal certainty for manufacturers than strict liability

=== Personal injury law ===
Personal injury law is one of the most controversial topics in tort reform. In New Zealand, the tort system for the majority of personal injuries was scrapped with the establishment of the Accident Compensation Corporation, a universal system of no-fault insurance. Proponents of tort reform argue that the success of that system in guaranteeing compensation where the tort system would not is an indication that tort law is inefficient at securing compensation for victims. By contrast, critics of tort reform are uncomfortable with the idea of abandoning personal liability for injuries as this could result in moral hazard.

== Rationale for tort reform ==
=== Equality in treatment ===
One rationale for tort reform is the purported ineffectiveness of tort law in securing equal compensation. If someone has an accident then they have a statistical 8% chance of finding a tortfeasor responsible for their injury. If they are lucky enough to have been injured by someone else's fault, then they can get full compensation (if the tortfeasor is not judgment proof). For others—for those injured by natural accidents, by themselves, by disease or by environmental factors; no compensation is available, and the most that can be gained for their losses will be meager state benefits for incapacity. Equality of treatment is the central issue for reforms in the Commonwealth, particularly in New Zealand.

This was the basis for much of Professor Patrick Atiyah's scholarship as articulated in Accidents, Compensation and the Law (1970). Originally his proposal was the gradual abolition of tort actions, and its replacement with schemes like those for industrial injuries to cover for all illness, disability and disease, whether caused by people or nature. Such a system was developed in New Zealand following recommendations from the Royal Commission in 1967 for 'no fault' compensation scheme (see The Woodhouse Report). Over the 1980s Atiyah's views shifted. He still argued that the tort system should be scrapped. But instead of relying on the state, he argued people should have to take out compulsory first party insurance, like that available for cars, and this model should be spread progressively.

=== Economic effects ===
Another rationale for tort reform is the distortionary impact tort litigation has on the economy.

One argument focuses on the costs of litigation and how payment of compensation raises the cost of insurance. Because most tort claims will be paid from the pockets of insurance, and because the public generally pays into insurance schemes of all kinds, tort reform proponents assert that reducing tort litigation and payouts will benefit everyone who pays for insurance.

Another argument is that the costs of the tort system, and in particular medical malpractice suits, raise the costs of health care. This argument is most often encountered in relation to litigation in countries that do not have universal health care. The difficulty in this area is to distinguish between public and private health care providers. In the UK, the cost was £1.6B a year as for 2014, increasing at 10%+ yearly Rising from £446m a year a decade earlier. The UK, however, has exceptionally low claims, as tort claims have been restricted, for instance in disallowing loss of chance cases. The Medical Defence Union actively combats, and attempts to settle all cases where potential negligence claims are at stake. While successful, the costs of litigation to the health system are steadily growing. In the United States, it is easier for victims of medical malpractice to seek compensation through the tort system. The American medical record in hospitals is poor, with around 195,000 deaths due to negligence per year, which itself leads to a higher number of claims. It is open to debate as to whether a change in the law of tort either way would lead to significant reductions in cost or changes in practice. According to Bloomberg Businessweek, "Study after study shows that costs associated with malpractice lawsuits make up 1% to 2% of the nation's $2.5 trillion annual health-care bill and that tort reform would barely make a dent in the total."

Another argument is that tort liability may stunt innovation. This argument usually comes in connection with product liability, which is strict liability in most common law jurisdictions and the European Union. If a product is faulty, and injures somebody who has come across it (whether they are the buyer or not) then the manufacturer will be responsible for compensating the victim regardless of whether it can be shown that the manufacturer was at fault. The standard, which originated in the twentieth century with cases such as Donoghue v Stevenson, is lower in other injury cases, so that a victim would have to prove that a tortfeasor had been negligent. It can be argued that strict liability deters innovation, because manufacturers could be reluctant to test out new products for fear that they could be subjecting themselves to massive tort claims.

Proponents of tort reform also criticise the extent to which legal costs can approach or exceed the value of the compensation awarded in damages, especially in contrast with compensation allocated through insurance or social security systems. In Britain, for instance, it has been argued that 85p is spent on litigation for every £1 of compensation paid. In contrast, the social security system costs 8p or 12p for every £1 delivered. (Note: This figure is disputed, because there is no easy method for accounting for transaction costs, particularly when pre-litigation settlements are considered.)

=== Cost of discovery ===
An additional rationale for tort reform is the ability of plaintiff's attorneys to use the discovery process of common law jurisdictions to impose costs on defendants in order to force settlements in unmeritorious cases to avoid the cost and inconvenience of discovery. The use of discovery in tort litigation favours the wealthier side in a lawsuit by enabling parties to drain each other's financial resources in a war of attrition. For example, one can make information requests that are potentially expensive and time-consuming for the other side to fulfill; respond to a discovery request with thousands of documents of questionable relevance to the case; file requests for protective orders to prevent the deposition of key witnesses; and take other measures that increase the difficulty and cost of discovery. It has been argued that although the goal of discovery is to level the playing field between the parties, the discovery rules instead create a multi-level playing field that favours the party that is in control of the information needed by the other party. Instead of encouraging discovery, the rules are described as encouraging lawyers to find new ways to manipulate and distort or conceal information.

Discovery, unique to common law jurisdictions, essentially grants powers to private parties and their counsel which are "functionally equivalent" to the power to issue self-executing administrative subpoenas. Consequently, commentators in civil law jurisdictions regard discovery destructive of the rule of law and as "a private inquisition." Civil law countries see the underlying objectives of discovery as properly monopolised by the state in order to maintain the rule of law: the investigative objective of discovery is the prerogative of the executive branch, and insofar as discovery may be able to facilitate the creation of new rights, that is the prerogative of the legislative branch.

Proponents of tort reform argue that the open-ended discovery process of common law jurisdictions enables plaintiffs arguing in bad faith to initiate frivolous tort lawsuits and coerce defendants into agreeing to legal settlements in otherwise unmeritorious actions. Strictly defined, a frivolous lawsuit is one that cannot reasonably be supported under existing legal precedent or under a good-faith argument for a change in the law. More broadly, the term is also used to describe tort lawsuits where there is only a remote link between the conduct of the defendant and the injuries alleged by the plaintiff or where the damages sought are perceived to be too high for the purported tortious conduct. The costs associated with discovery in frivolous lawsuits are a nuisance for individuals against whom such litigation is brought in bad faith. Curtailing frivolous lawsuits, especially those brought by lawyers acting in bad faith or charging contingent fees, is a major objective of tort reform. Opponents of tort reform argue that summary judgment in such cases adequately addresses those issues. In common law jurisdictions which allow for extensive pre-trial discovery, the burden and (where the American rule is applied) cost of litigation are not necessarily addressed by summary judgment. In particularly oppressive defamation lawsuits, the special motion to strike aims to address this issue by pausing all discovery between the time the motion is filed and the judge's ruling on the motion. Presently, most jurisdictions regard the prosecution of "frivolous" lawsuits as grounds for disciplinary proceedings against attorneys and potential ground for disbarment. (Note: For instance, in every American jurisdiction, if a defendant or the judge believes that a plaintiff has misrepresented the facts or the law or has brought a "frivolous" pleading, the defendant, or the court on its own initiative, may ask for the action to be thrown out and for the attorney bringing the action to be penalised with a variety of sanctions. For example, Rule 11 of the Federal Rules of Civil Procedure provide in part: "By presenting to the court a pleading, written motion, or other paper--whether by signing, filing, submitting, or later advocating it--an attorney or unrepresented party certifies that to the best of the person's knowledge, information, and belief, formed after an inquiry reasonable under the circumstances: . . . (2) the claims, defenses, and other legal contentions are warranted by existing law or by a non-frivolous argument for extending, modifying, or reversing existing law or for establishing new law; [and] (3) the factual contentions have evidentiary support or, if specifically so identified, will likely have evidentiary support after a reasonable opportunity for further investigation or discovery." If the court decides that the plaintiff has violated this rule, it has wide discretion to sanction the offending party, the party's attorney or both, including the discretion to dismiss the plaintiff's claim or claims, order the plaintiff, the plaintiff's attorney or both to pay money, reprimand the attorney and/or refer the offending attorney to the applicable disciplinary authorities, among other things. Ethical rules also forbid attorneys from filing "frivolous" lawsuits. State courts and bar associations typically publish sanctions imposed on attorneys for violations of these rules. A simple review of these published opinions demonstrates that courts take violations of their pleading and ethical rules seriously.)

=== Regulation through litigation ===
Some advocates of tort reform also complain of regulation through litigation, the idea that litigation is being used to achieve regulatory ends that advocates would not be able to achieve through the democratic process. Private attorney general suits in America are frequently criticised as examples of regulation through litigation. (Note: For example, Rep. Rick Boucher (D-VA) argued in support of a 2005 federal tort reform that gave immunity to gun manufacturers in certain lawsuits because such lawsuits were "nothing more than thinly veiled attempts to circumvent the legislative process and achieve gun control through litigation"; reform supporters complained that (and the Pentagon supported the bill on the grounds that) the plaintiffs were trying to "sue [gun manufacturers] out of existence" by forcing them to incur $250 million in legal defence expenses, while gun control supporters argued that the legislation took "away the right of victims to be able to have their day in court," that the bill gave unprecedented immunity to a single industry, and claimed that the law was unconstitutional.) Similarly, public interest litigation in India has been criticised for undermining parliamentary sovereignty and enabling the court system to exert inordinate power over the legislative and executive branches of government. For instance, the emergence of constitutional torts has been criticised as an undemocratic example of judicial activism. Controversy further arose when judges began to read such obligations of the state into Article 21 of the Indian Constitution However, opponents of tort reform assert that public interest litigation in India has served to secure "social and distributive justice."

== Categories of reforms ==
A wide variety of tort reforms have been implemented or proposed in different jurisdictions, each attempting to address a particular deficiency perceived in the system of tort law. Generally, these can be broken down into two categories: reforms limiting damages recoverable by a plaintiff and procedural reforms limiting the ability of plaintiffs to file lawsuits.

=== Reforms to damages ===
A large portion of tort reforms seek to limit the damages a plaintiff can be awarded. The rationale underlying these reforms is that, by limiting the profitability of tort lawsuits to plaintiffs, they will reduce the incentive to file frivolous lawsuits. There are several varieties of reforms to the system of damages.

==== Damages caps ====
A common element of tort reform is to try to limit the amount of damages that an injured party may recover from a defendant, even if the injured party is left inadequately compensated as a result of the cap.

Non-economic damages caps place limits on noneconomic damages and collecting lawsuit claim data from malpractice insurance companies and courts in order to assess any connection between malpractice settlements and premium rates. Such caps can be general or limited to a particular category of cases. (Note: For example, the American federal government has instituted a $250,000 cap on non-economic damages for medical malpractice claims.) Non-economic damages include pain and suffering. While tort compensation can often be accurately calculated for property damage, such as where damages are in the amount of repair or replacement value, it is difficult to quantify the injuries to a person's body and mind. There is no market for severed legs or sanity of mind, and so there is no price which a court can readily apply in compensation for the wrong.

Some courts have developed scales of damages awards, benchmarks for compensation, which relate to the severity of the injury. For instance, in the United Kingdom, the loss of a thumb is compensated at £18,000, for an arm £72,000, for two arms £150,000, and so on. Even more difficult to reckon are damages for the pain and suffering of an injury. But while a scale may be consistent, the award itself is arbitrary and there is no objective basis for the setting of amounts or objective justification for their not being substantially higher or lower.

Punitive damages caps limit the amount of punitive damages awardable to a plaintiff. In most civil law jurisdictions, punitive damages are unavailable and are considered contrary to public policy since the civil justice system in many countries does not accord defendants the procedural protections present in the criminal justice system thus penalising an individual without allowing them the ordinary procedural protections that are present in a criminal trial. The rationale for restricting punitive damages is that such damages encourage a vindictive, revenge seeking state of mind in the claimant and society more generally. In the UK, Rookes v Barnard limited the situations in which punitive damages can be won in tort actions to where they are expressly authorised by a statute, where a defendant's action is calculated to make profit, or where an official of the state has acted arbitrarily, oppressively or unconstitutionally. In the United States, though rarely awarded in tort cases, punitive damages are available, and are sometimes quite staggering when awarded. (Note: For example, in 1999, a Los Angeles County jury awarded $4.8 billion in punitive damages against General Motors to a group of six burn victims whose 1979 Chevrolet Malibu was rear-ended by a drunk driver, causing it to catch fire. That was later reduced to $1.2 billion by the judge.)

==== Attorney fee awards ====
Another possible modification of tort law, in jurisdictions where it is not already the norm, is to implement the English rule whereby the losing party to a case covers the victorious party's legal costs. In Commonwealth countries as well as certain American states, the losing party must pay for the court costs of the winning party. The English rule Is also a prevailing norm in European civil law jurisdictions. For example, after authors Michael Baigent and Richard Leigh lost their plagiarism litigation over The Da Vinci Code in a British court, they were ordered to pay the defendants' $1.75 million in attorneys' fees. The "American rule" differs; in most cases, each party bears its own expense of litigation. Supporters of tort reform argue that loser-pays rules are fairer, would compensate winners of lawsuits against the costs of litigation, would deter marginal lawsuits and tactical litigation, and would create proper incentives for litigation, and argue for reforms that would require compensation of winning defendants some or all the time. Certain proposed or implemented tort reforms adopt the English rule if the respondent should prevail but retain the American rule otherwise (e.g. California's special motion to strike in defamation suits).

==== Changes to negligence law ====
In addition to reforms aimed at limiting plaintiff's abilities to claim particular categories of compensation, tort reform measures aimed at reducing the prevalence of lawsuits for negligence, the most commonly alleged tort, aim to revise the doctrine of comparative negligence. Comparative negligence is a partial legal defence that reduces the amount of damages that a plaintiff can recover in a negligence-based claim based upon the degree to which the plaintiff's own negligence contributed to cause the injury, which progressively displaced the erstwhile traditional doctrine of contributory negligence over the twentieth century which had precluded any damages being awarded in cases in which the plaintiff was deemed to be even partially at fault. Under standard or "pure" comparative negligence, a plaintiff can seek damages regardless of the portion of liability they bear, even where they are found to be more at fault than the respondent. As a tort reform measure aimed at combatting the perceived unfairness of allowing a party to seek extra-contractual damages where they are primarily at fault, many common law jurisdictions have adopted a "modified" doctrine of comparative negligence in which a party may only recover damages if it bears less than half the liability or if the other party bears more than half the liability. More radically, the American states of Alabama, Maryland, North Carolina, and Virginia continue to use contributory negligence, thus precluding a party who is even partly at fault from recovering damages for negligence.

=== Procedural reforms ===
Procedural reforms to the tort system aim to dissuade or prevent litigants from filing suit without directly altering the damages they may receive.

One type of procedural reform is to reduce the time to sue—the statute of limitations of actions. New York law now requires that:

An action for medical, dental or podiatric malpractice must be commenced within two years and six months of the act, omission or failure complained of or last treatment where there is continuous treatment for the same illness, injury or condition which gave rise to the said act, omission or failure; provided, however, that where the action is based upon the discovery of a foreign object in the body of the patient, the action may be commenced within one year of the date of such discovery or of the date of discovery of facts which would reasonably lead to such discovery, whichever is earlier.

— N.Y. Civil Practice Law and Rules (CPLR) § 214-a.

Another type of procedural reform is imposing restrictions on class action lawsuits in jurisdictions where they are available. Mass actions are lawsuits where a group of claimants band together to bring similar claims all at once. Class actions are lawsuits where counsel for one or more claimants bring claims on behalf of similarly situated claimants. While class actions originated and are most common in the United States and Canada, similar procedures are increasingly common in other common law jurisdictions. Class actions are justified on the basis that they ensure equal treatment of similarly situated victims, avoid the risk of conflicting judgments on similar issues, and allow an efficient resolution of a large number of claims. In the US, class actions have been used (and by some views abused) in order to overcome the differences applicable in different jurisdictions, including the perceived predispositions of judges, juries, and differences in substantive or procedural law. So if one claimant lives in State X, where courts and laws are unfavourable to their claim, but another claimant lives in the more favourable jurisdiction of State Y, they may bring a class action together in State Y. Strictly speaking, State Y must not adjudicate the claim unless it is found that the applicable law is similar or identical in both states, but as a practical matter this rule is often disregarded in favour of efficient resolution of claims. More broadly, addressing perceived forum shopping has become a contentious aspect of tort reform, notably with defamation cases and libel tourism.

Tort reform advocate Common Good has proposed creating specialised medical courts (similar to distinct tax courts) where medically trained judges would evaluate cases and subsequently render precedent-setting decisions. Proponents believe that giving up jury trials and scheduling noneconomic damages such as pain and suffering would lead to more people being compensated, and to their receiving their money sooner. Critics of the health courts concept contend that it is ill-conceived, that it would be unfair to patients, that it would be unlikely to achieve its objectives, and that much of its goals as are reasonable can be achieved more fairly and with greater efficiency under the existing civil justice system. In addition, experts have suggested that health courts would be inevitably biased towards physicians, and that the bureaucracy needed to introduce safeguards against such bias would negate any cost savings. Still, a number of groups and individuals have supported this proposal.

Another type of procedural reform is to modify the criteria related to a defendant's state of mind in order to increase the burden of proof imposed on the plaintiff. Tort reform in Texas changed the definition of negligence in the context of emergency room treatment to include only "willful and wanton" acts. This has been interpreted as including only acts intended to harm the patient.

Tort reformers have had the most legislative success in limiting the common law rule of joint and several liability, often replacing it with a rule of proportionate liability. Of the forty-six states that had a joint and several liability rule, thirty-three states have abolished or limited the rule. Opponents of tort reform contend that the elimination of the rule would under-compensate people who had the misfortune to be hurt by more than one person, if at least one of the defendants does not have the financial means to pay his or her share of proportionate liability.

The abolition of the collateral source rule (i.e. the principle that a respondent in a tort action cannot use the fact that a plaintiff has already been compensated as evidence) is another common proposal of tort reform advocates in jurisdictions where the rule exists. They argue that if the plaintiff's injuries and damages have already been compensated, it is unfair and duplicative to allow an award of damages against the respondent. As a result, numerous states have altered or partially abrogated the rule by statute.

Regulation of contingent fees; as well as rules regarding barratry, champerty and maintenance, or litigation funding more generally; is another aspect of procedural policies and reforms designed to reduce the number of cases filed in civil court.

== Tort reform by jurisdiction ==
=== United States ===
Tort reform advocates frequently contend that too many of the lawsuits filed in the United States each year are "frivolous" lawsuits. The term "frivolous lawsuit" has acquired a broader rhetorical definition in political debates about tort reform, where it is sometimes used by reform advocates to describe legally non-frivolous tort lawsuits that critics believe are without merit, or award high damage awards relative to actual damages. In the United States, tort reform is a contentious political issue. US tort reform advocates propose, among other things, procedural limits on the ability to file claims, and capping the awards of damages. Opponents of tort reform argue that reformers have misstated the existence of any real factual issue and criticise tort reform as disguised corporate welfare.

Tort reform advocates argue that the present tort system is too expensive, that meritless lawsuits clog up the courts, that per capita tort costs vary significantly from state to state, and that trial attorneys too often receive an overly large percentage of the punitive damages awarded to plaintiffs in tort cases. (The typical contingent fee arrangement provides for the lawyer to retain one-third of any recovery.) A Towers Perrin report indicates that U. S. tort costs were up slightly in 2007, are expected to significantly increase in 2008, and shows trends dating back as far as 1950. More recent research from the same source has found that tort costs as a percentage of GDP dropped between 2001 and 2009, and are now at their lowest level since 1984. High-profile tort cases are often portrayed by the media as the legal system's version of a lottery, where trial lawyers actively seek the magic combination of plaintiff, defendant, judge, and jury. Advocates of tort reform complain of unconstitutional regulation caused by litigation, and that litigation is used to circumvent the legislative process by achieving regulation that Congress is unwilling or unable to pass.

Tort reform is also proposed as one solution to rapidly increasing health care costs in the United States. In a study published in 2005 in the Journal of the American Medical Association, 93% of physicians surveyed reported practicing defensive medicine, or "[altering] clinical behavior because of the threat of malpractice liability." Of physicians surveyed, 43% reported using digital imaging technology in clinically unnecessary circumstances, which includes costly MRIs and CAT scans. Forty-two per cent of respondents reported that they had taken steps to restrict their practice in the previous 3 years, including eliminating procedures prone to complications, such as trauma surgery, and avoiding patients who had complex medical problems or were perceived as litigious.

A few of the changes frequently advocated include limits on punitive damages, limits on non-economic damages, limiting the collateral source doctrine, use of court-appointed expert witnesses, elimination of elections for judges, reducing appeal bond requirements for defendants faced with bankruptcy, "venue reform", which limits the jurisdictions within which one can file a lawsuit, limits on contingency fees, the adoption of the English Rule of "loser pays" (the defeated party must pay both the plaintiff's and the defendant's expenses), and requiring that class action lawsuits with nationwide plaintiffs be tried in federal courts, eliminating awards for pre-judgment interest. Many of these measures tend to benefit defendants; others, such as the English rule, sanctions for delay, and early-offer settlement requirements, could have benefits to plaintiffs in some cases.

Not all tort reform supporters support all proposed tort reforms. For example, there is a split over whether the collateral source doctrine should be abolished, and there is a healthy debate over whether it would be beneficial to further restrict the ability of attorneys to charge contingent fees.

While tort reform is frequently associated with the Republican Party, both support of and opposition to tort reform is found across the political spectrum in America. (Note: For instance, while serving as a senator, Barack Obama voted for the Class Action Fairness Act of 2005 and for the FISA Amendments Act, which granted civil immunity to telecommunications companies that cooperated with NSA warrantless wiretapping operations. Similarly, in the 2000 presidential election, the Democrats' vice presidential nominee, Senator Joe Lieberman, was a leading supporter of tort reform; former New Republic and Slate editor Michael Kinsley has often criticised products liability law; and the conservative pro-life group Center for a Just Society opposes many tort reform measures, arguing that litigation can be used to keep RU-486 off the market.) Reform of defamation torts, contrary to the general assumption that tort reform is a primarily Republican or conservative issue, is a popular cause among Democrats and liberals more generally who are concerned with lawsuits brought by wealthy corporations and individuals against critics. The United States Supreme Court sometimes weighs in on tort reform debates, but here too, the justices do not always vote according to their predicted ideological stereotypes. In the seminal case of BMW v. Gore, the court ruled that the Constitution placed limits on punitive damages, with liberal justices Stephen Breyer and John Paul Stevens in the majority and Justices Antonin Scalia and Ruth Bader Ginsburg dissenting. Under Chief Justice John Roberts, some expect the court to be more likely to take cases that could resolve tort reform debates.

In March and April 2012, the Lower Rio Grande Valley in Texas was hit with two severe hailstorms. Texas Monthly wrote, "Windows were shattered. Hail knocked holes in rooftops. Unfortunate animals were beaten to death." Insurers paid out $556 million in claims to homeowners and $47 million to car owners. After the storms, thousands of lawsuits were filed against insurers and adjusters. The lawsuits were based on allegations of "low-ball payments on claims". As a reaction, a state senator introduced legislation (Senate Bill 1628) to reform hailstorm litigation. The bill represented "an almost visceral fight between the insurance industry, Texans for Lawsuit Reform and trial lawyers whose symbolic leader in storm-damage claims in Steve Mostyn of Houston." By 2014, there had been 2,000 lawsuits filed in Hidalgo County, Texas. "One local attorney had erected a billboard 'evoking fire and brimstone' to remind homeowners that they had to file a claim within two years." According to Texas Monthly, "By May [of 2014], there had been 5,972 lawsuits filed, with Mostyn and members of his firm filing 1,612 of them." Mostyn "had pioneered" lawsuits for storm damage after Hurricane Ike. He made over $86 million in legal fees. In February 2017, a bill was introduced in the Texas state Senate that would aim "at ending hailstorm lawsuit abuse." Texas Lt. Gov. Dan Patrick supported the bill (Senate Bill 10) and said during his State of the State address, "Hailstorm litigation is the newest form of lawsuit abuse." Patrick said that storm litigation rates had risen dramatically, causing insurance companies to increase premiums and reduce coverage. The bill would still allow hailstorm insurance claimants to sue their insurance company. It would allow plaintiffs to sue for either deceptive trade practices or unfair settlement, but not both. According to SE Texas Record, "The bill also seeks to end barratry in hail litigation, as reports of lawyers employing contractors and insurance adjusters to drum up clients have continued to surface the past several years." The bill would also prevent plaintiffs from suing their individual insurance agent. An identical bill (HB 1774) was introduced in the Texas House of Representatives.

==== Punitive awards and juries ====
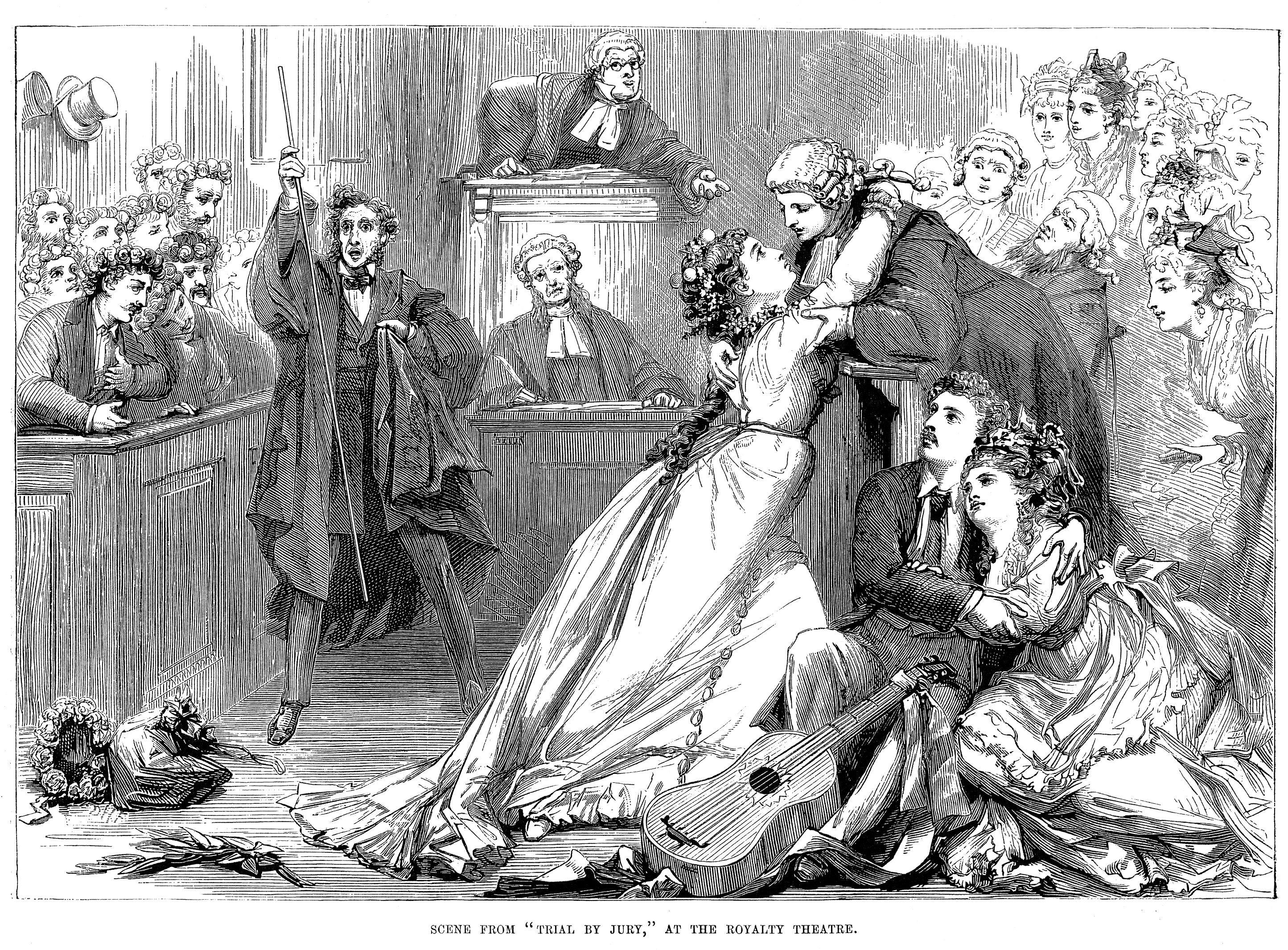
A trial by jury is unusual in almost all countries for non-criminal cases.

It is argued that extraordinary damage awards in the United States are a result of the jury system. In federal courts in the United States, the right to a jury trial in most civil cases is entrenched in the Seventh Amendment of the United States Constitution. Many state constitutions have similar clauses to protect the right to a jury trial in state court proceedings. This is in stark contrast to continental Europe and the majority of Asian, African, and Latin American jurisdictions in which juries either never existed or were abolished following decolonisation (e.g. in India, Singapore, and most former British colonies in Africa) as an anachronistic institution that routinely introduced societal biases into the judicial process. Even in New Zealand and the United Kingdom, where juries are available in criminal cases, they are only permitted tort cases involving defamation, false imprisonment, and malicious prosecution. Even in these limited areas of tort law, there have been growing concerns about the juries' role. In particular, the disparity between awards in defamation cases (which invariably concern celebrities, politicians and the rich) and awards for personal injuries has been growing. A potential cause for the unpredictability of juries in tort cases is that individual jurors, unlike professional judges, are unfamiliar both with the law and with daily exposure to tragic accidents in tort litigation. When confronted with their first case they are thus likelier to award punitively high damages in order to 'teach' tortfeasors that "tort does not pay".

==== Dispute over "litigation explosion" claims ====
The American Tort Reform Association (ATRA) claims that "The cost of the U.S. tort system for 2003 was $246 billion, or $845 per citizen or $3,380 for a family of four" and "The Growth of U.S. tort costs have exceeded the Gross Domestic Product (GDP) by 2-3 per centage points in the past 50 years". This claim is based on a 2002 study by Tillinghast-Towers Perrin.

Opponents of tort reform deny that there has been a "litigation explosion" or "liability crisis", and contend that the changes proposed by tort reform advocates are unjustified. Records maintained by the National Center for State Courts show that population-adjusted tort filings declined from 1992 to 2001. The average change in tort filings was a 15% decrease. The Bureau of Justice Statistics, a division of the Department of Justice (DOJ), found that the number of civil trials dropped by 47% between 1992 and 2001. The DOJ also found that the median inflation-adjusted award in all tort cases dropped 56.3% between 1992 and 2001 to $28,000.

Tort reform advocates allege that these numbers are misleading. They claim that most liability costs come from pre-trial settlements, so the number of trials is irrelevant. Supporters further note that the number of "filings" is a misleading statistic, because modern filings are much more likely to be class actions with many more joined claims than the cases of decades ago. They also note that the choice of the 1992 start date is misleading, because the largest increase in the number of tort cases occurred between 1970 and 1992. They also argue that the use of the median, rather than the mean, is a misleading statistic for measuring the magnitude of the litigation problem.

Supporters frequently base their claims of an "explosion" in the costs of tort litigation based on annual studies by Tillinghast/Towers Perrin, a major consultant to the insurance industry. In 2008, Towers Perrin reported that the cost of liability litigation has outpaced the growth of the GDP growth of 9% in estimated annual tort costs between 1951 and 2007 as opposed to a 7% average annual growth in GDP—representing 2.2% of GDP in 2004 vs. just 0.6% in 1950 and 1.3% in 1970. More recent research from the same source has found that tort costs as a per centage of GDP dropped between 2001 and 2009, and are now at their lowest level since 1984. The Tillinghast/Towers Perrin study has been criticised by the Economic Policy Institute, a progressive think tank: "Although TTP's estimate is widely cited by journalists, politicians, and business lobbyists, it is impossible to know what the company is actually measuring in its calculation of tort costs, and impossible to verify its figures, because TTP will not share its data or its methodology, which it claims are 'proprietary.'" Tort reform supporters claim that the Towers Perrin numbers are underestimates in many ways.

=== New Zealand ===
In 1972, New Zealand introduced the first universal no-fault insurance scheme for all accident victims, which provides benefit from the government-run Accident Compensation Corporation without respect to negligence. Its goal is to achieve equality of compensation, while reducing costs of litigation.

Australia and the United Kingdom drew up proposals for similar no-fault schemes, but they were never implemented.

=== United Kingdom ===
- Pearson Commission (Royal Commission on Civil Liability and Compensation for Personal Injuries) 1979
- Sir Liam Donaldson, Making Amends (2003) Crown Copyright
- NHS Redress (Wales) Measure 2007

== Impact on safety ==
Proponents of the existing tort system contend that tort reform advocates exaggerate the costs and ignore the benefits of the current tort system. For example, consumer advocates and legal scholars contend that lawsuits encourage corporations to produce safer products, discourage them from selling dangerous products such as asbestos, and encourage more safe and effective medical practices. Beginning in the early 1980s, Professor Stephen Teret and other faculty at The Johns Hopkins University School of Public Health argued that tort litigation was an important tool for the prevention of injuries. While Teret acknowledged that the primary purpose of tort lawsuits usually is to recover money damages for the injured persons, as compensation for their medical and other costs, he identified several ways that litigation can also enhance safety for everyone, including:

(1) to avoid paying future damages, the creators of dangerous products or conditions may voluntarily make them safer; (2) where conduct is particularly egregious, courts may award punitive damages to deter that conduct in the future; (3) the process of gathering information prior to trial – called 'discovery' – can bring information to light that can be used by policy-makers to create new laws or regulations.

In contrast, a 2006 study by Emory University professors Paul Rubin and Joanna M. Shepherd argued that tort reform actually saved tens of thousands of lives because "lower expected liability costs result in lower prices, enabling consumers to buy more risk-reducing products such as medicines, safety equipment, and medical services, and as consumers take additional precautions to avoid accidents." They also concluded that "caps on noneconomic damages, a higher evidence standard for punitive damages, product liability reform, and prejudgment interest reform lead to fewer accidental deaths, while reforms to the collateral source rule lead to increased deaths."

Tort reform advocates cite a 1990 study of auto safety improvements by Harvard University professor John D. Graham for a conference at the Brookings Institution found that

The case studies provide little evidence that expanded product liability risk was necessary to achieve the safety improvements that have been made. In the absence of liability risk, the combined effects of consumer demand, regulation, and professional responsibility would have been sufficient to achieve improved safety. In some cases, however, liability seemed to cause safety improvements to occur more quickly than they would have in the absence of liability.

Graham further notes that

there is no evidence that expanded liability for design choices has been a significant cause of the passenger safety improvements witnessed since World War II. Graham concludes by endorsing reform, noting that case studies of the current product liability system "suggest that manufacturers may be inclined to delay design improvements when they fear that improvements will be used against them [in court].

However, design improvements to increase safety cannot be used against manufacturers in court to show that the product was unsafe. Rule 407 of the Federal Rule of Evidence specifically states, "evidence of the subsequent measures is not admissible to prove: negligence; culpable conduct; a defect in a product or its design; or a need for a warning or instruction." This means that evidence of changing the design of a product after an accident cannot be used in court against the manufacturer to prove it is liable for the damage.

It is true, however, that the evidence could be introduced to prove "ownership, control, or the feasibility of precautionary measures." But, a lawyer representing the manufacturer could concede ownership and control, and thus prevent the evidence from being introduced for that purpose. And a lawyer for the manufacturer could seek to prevent the introduction of the evidence to show feasibility of precautionary measures if he/she argued such evidence would violate Rule 403 of the Federal Rules of evidence. Rule 403 bars evidence that is relevant, but overly prejudicial.

Another presenter at the same Brooking Institution conference, Murray Mackay of the University of Birmingham, claimed safety (and other) innovations were inhibited by fear of lawsuits:

[S]trict liability has had a negative influence on innovation. It has held back new designs, consumed resources that might otherwise have been directed at design improvement, and added on costs to the consumer. ... [I]n Western European countries ... liability risks are low and the marketplace pays a premium for innovative technology in safety as well as other areas. As a result, most safety-related advances in recent years have come from European manufacturers and, more recently, from the Japanese.

The effect of tort reform on medical outcomes has been studied, with mixed results. A 2008 study found worse childbirth outcomes for mothers and infants in states with caps on non-economic damages. The Klick/Stratman paper cited above found several effects of specific tort reforms on infant mortality that lost statistical significance when looked at more closely—that is, correlation with other state-specific factors wiped out apparent increases in mortality from joint and several liability reform but also wiped out apparent decreases in mortality from capping economic damages and restrictions on contingency fees. The only tort reform effect that proved robust was a negative effect of collateral source reform on black infant mortality.

Proponents of tort reform counter by pointing to data from New Zealand, which has abolished its medical tort system but has medical error rates close to those in the United States. Tort reform advocates, including Paul Offit, also argue that litigation has driven from the US marketplace many useful and safe medical advances, including Bendectin (the withdrawal of which has led to a doubling of hospital admissions for morning sickness) and vaccines for Lyme disease and Group B Streptococcal disease, which kills one hundred infants per year.

== Controversy over the impact on business ==
Some supporters of tort reform posit that reforms can significantly reduce the costs of doing business, thus benefiting consumers and the public in the long run. Harvard Business School professor Michael E. Porter stated: "product liability is so extreme and uncertain as to retard innovation. The legal and regulatory climate places firms in constant jeopardy of costly and ... lengthy product suits. The existing approach goes beyond any reasonable need to protect consumers, as other nations have demonstrated through more pragmatic approaches." A commission by the American Insurance Association and co-authored by Nobel Prize winner Joseph Stiglitz to look at the effects of bankruptcies from asbestos litigation on workers in the asbestos industry; the study estimated that 52,000 jobs were lost.

Critics of the tort reform movement dispute the claim that the current tort system has a significant impact on national or global economies. The Economic Policy Institute wrote that the effect on the economy of job loss resulting from lawsuits is negligible:

In an April 2002 paper, the CEA (President Bush's Council of Economic Advisors) examined the economic impacts of the tort system in somewhat greater depth. But that paper, too, failed to demonstrate any employment effects of the tort system and made no prediction about the impact of tort law change. Even if we assume that asbestos liability legislation could somehow have prevented the loss of 2,500 jobs per year resulting from asbestos-related bankruptcies (by, for example, limiting compensation for non-economic damages to the victims or their survivors, or by denying awards of punitive damages), the effect on overall employment and the national unemployment rate in an economy with more than 130 million payroll jobs would have been imperceptible (a change of less than two-thousandths of 1%).

== See also ==
- Accident Compensation Corporation
- Australian tort law
- Alimony reform
- English tort law
- United States tort law
  - Asbestos and the law
  - American Tort Reform Association
  - Class Action Fairness Act of 2005
  - Compensation culture
  - Junk science
  - Liebeck v. McDonald's Restaurants (the McDonald's coffee case)
  - Medical malpractice
  - Pearson v. Chung (concerning $67m for a judge's trousers)
  - Private Securities Litigation Reform Act
  - Product liability
  - Punitive damages
- Software patent debate and Patent troll (concerning reform of patent law, which pits similar interests against one another)

== Bibliography ==
- Dobbs, Dan B., Hayden, Paul T., and Bublick, Ellen M. Torts and Compensation. Eighth edition. West Academic Publishing, 2017.
- Peter Cane, Atiyah's Accidents, Compensation and the Law (2006)
- PS Atiyah, The Damages Lottery (1997)
- Peter Huber and Robert E. Litan, eds., The Liability Maze: The Impact of Liability Law on Safety and Innovation. Washington, D.C.: Brookings Institution, ISBN 0-8157-3760-2
