= Newport News asbestos litigation =

Stemming from use in shipbuilding industry

In Newport News, Virginia, asbestos litigation is driven by the presence of Newport News Shipbuilding and other defense contractors. Asbestos was widely used in the shipbuilding industry.

== Cases ==
About 500 people have died due to asbestos exposure at the Newport News shipyard.

=== Exxon ===
In March 2011, a jury in Newport News awarded about $25 million to a former shipyard worker named Rubert Minton. Minton had worked on 17 different Exxon tankers over the course of his career. Decades later he began to suffer from mesothelioma. He filed suit against Exxon in 2009. Minton's lead attorney was Robert Hatten. Hatten said the award would be reduced to about $17.5 million because the $12.5 million in punitive damages awarded by the jury exceeded the $5 million that had been demanded by Minton.

Suits against ship owners were a novel legal development. Most of the asbestos suits in Newport News had previously been brought against parts makers. Shipyards have immunity from asbestos suits under worker's compensation laws. Exxon said the shipyard was solely responsible for the safety of its workers and that there was no proof on its ships. Minton lawyers said Exxon knew about health risks from asbestos in the 1930s and created rules to protect its own workers but did nothing to warn shipyard workers.

=== Dorthe Crisp Gibbs v. Newport News Shipbuilding & Drydock Co. ===
Gibbs was an active-duty member of the United States Navy when he was exposed to asbestos after being ordered to take part in pre-commission tests of a nuclear submarine. He later developed mesothelioma and died in 2009. Gibbs sued Newport News in 2008. His wife continued that suit and sued for wrongful death.

The state circuit court dismissed her case. The court ruled that worker's compensation was her exclusive remedy. The Virginia state supreme court overturned the circuit court's decision in 2012. It found that because the Navy was not liable under worker's compensation Gibbs could file suit against Newport News.

== Criticism ==
The American Tort Reform Association (ATRA) has named Newport News a "Judicial Hellhole" for allegedly applying the law in biased manner in favor of plaintiffs. Plaintiffs in Newport News have roughly an 87% success rate. Robert Hatten, a leading asbestos attorney in Newport News of the firm Patten, Wornom, Hatten & Diamondstein, said the ATRA was engaging in "propaganda."
