= Accident Compensation Corporation =

New Zealand Crown entity

- Te Kaporeihana Āwhina Hunga Whara (Māori)

Crown entity overview
- Jurisdiction: New Zealand Government
- Headquarters: Wellington; 41.274876°S 174.777701°E
- Minister responsible: Scott Simpson, Minister for ACC
- Crown entity executive: Megan Main, Chief Executive
- Website: www.acc.co.nz

The Accident Compensation Corporation (ACC) (Māori: Te Kaporeihana Āwhina Hunga Whara) is the New Zealand Crown entity responsible for administering the country's no-fault accidental injury compensation scheme, commonly referred to as the ACC scheme. The scheme provides financial compensation and support to citizens, residents, and temporary visitors who have suffered personal injuries.

The corporation was founded as the Accident Compensation Commission on 1 April 1974 as a result of the Accident Compensation Act 1972. Its principal governing act today is the Accident Compensation Act 2001. As a Crown entity, ACC is governed by a board that is responsible to the Minister for ACC. Unlike most other Crown entities, it has its own dedicated ministerial portfolio, which since February 2025 has been held by Scott Simpson.

== History ==
The ACC has its origins in the Workers' Compensation for Accidents Act 1900, which established a limited compensation scheme for workers who had suffered injuries where there was no directly responsible party. In 1966, a New Zealand Royal Commission, chaired by High Court judge Owen Woodhouse, was established. In 1967 the Royal Commission recommended extending this compensation to cover all injuries on a no-fault basis. Following this report, the New Zealand Parliament passed the Accident Compensation Act 1972, later amended in 1973. The Accident Compensation Commission was established from 1 April 1974. In 1992, the commission was renamed the Accident Compensation Corporation (ACC), as a short form for its official name Accident Rehabilitation and Compensation Insurance Corporation The Act was later replaced by the Injury Prevention, Rehabilitation and Compensation Act 2001, which was in 2010 renamed the Accident Compensation Act 2001. The Commission's annual report for 1989/90 proposed that the distinction between accidents—which are covered—and "illness"—which is not—should be dropped. This proposal was not taken up by the government.

From 1 July 1999, the fourth National government allowed private insurance operators to provide work-related accident insurance, and ACC was briefly exposed to competition. The fifth Labour government (elected in November 1999) repealed this change, and as of 1 July 2000 re-instated ACC as the sole provider of accident insurance coverage.

On 30 May 2025, ACC chair Tracey Batten resigned effective immediately. In March 2024, the sixth National Government had renewed a chairmanship for a further three-year term until 2027.

== Features ==
ACC is the sole and compulsory provider of accident insurance in New Zealand for all work and non-work related injuries. The corporation administers the ACC Scheme on a no-fault basis, so that anyone, regardless of the way in which they suffered an injury, has coverage under the scheme. Due to the scheme's no-fault basis, people who have suffered personal injury do not have the right to sue an at-fault party, except for exemplary damages. As of July 2026, the scheme does not cover injuries received by volunteer firefighters in their service in relation to mental injuries received due to trauma, to the same extent as their paid firefighters.

However, the Accident Compensation Act 2001 defines "personal injury" in a manner that restricts the concept of injury to physical injury or a mental injury due to a physical injury. Only mental injury caused by sexual assault has been excluded from the definition of personal injury and the claimant does not have to prove physical injury

The scheme provides a range of entitlements to injured people, however 93.5 percent of new claims in 2011 to 2012 were for treatment costs only. Other entitlements include weekly compensation for lost earnings (paid at a rate of 80% of a person's pre-injury earnings) and the cost of home or vehicle modifications for the seriously injured. The scheme offers entitlements subject to various eligibility criteria. ACC works with partners and communities on initiatives to prevent injuries. These initiatives include "RugbySmart" with New Zealand Rugby, "Ride Forever", "Mates and Dates", and "Make Your Home a Safety Zone" with Safekids Aotearoa.

It is claimed that the system encourages clinicians to report mistakes. The cost of litigation to the health system is considerably less than in some other countries.

== Alternative therapies ==
ACC has been criticised for providing funding for several alternative therapies that are unsupported by scientific evidence, including acupuncture, osteopathy and chiropractic interventions.

== Funding ==
ACC is primarily funded through a combination of levies and government contributions. Income collected from each source goes into predetermined accounts based on the source. Costs relating to an injury are paid from one of these accounts based on the type and cause of the injury.

The four main accounts are: Work, Earners, Non-Earners, and Motor Vehicle. There is also a fifth account: Treatment Injury (formerly Medical Misadventure), that draws on both the Earners and Non-Earners accounts.

Levy rates were most recently approved by Cabinet in November 2021 after a final recommendation from ACC Minister Carmel Sepuloni, for the 2022/23, 2023/24 and 2024/25 levy periods. Levy periods run from the 1st of April to the 31st of March the following year.

Account	Types of injury covered	Income sources
Work	Work-related	Levies collected from employers and self-employed people. The amount payable averages 0.63% of an employer's payroll or income earned (as of 1 April 2024), though rates vary depending on the employer's industry and risks associated with it.
Earners	Non-work-related, by income-earners	Levies collected in conjunction with tax deductions on income. Paid by employees through PAYE or by self-employed people directly. The amount payable is 1.39% of income earned (as of 1 April 2024).
Non-earners	Non-work-related, by non-income-earners (i.e. children, the elderly and unemployed, visitors)	Government contribution from the general taxation pool.
Motor Vehicle	Relating to motor vehicles on public roads	Levies included in the price of petrol (not diesel or LPG), and through motor vehicle license fees. The levy on motor vehicle license fees averages $113.94 (GST-exclusive) per vehicle per year (as of 1 April 2024), with motorcycles and heavy vehicles paying more than average due to the increased likelihood of injury associated with these modes of transport, and the petrol levy is set at 6c per litre (GST-exclusive).
Treatment Injury	As a result of medical treatment (previously known as medical misadventure)	Funded from the Earners and Non-Earners accounts, depending on the clients' employment status.

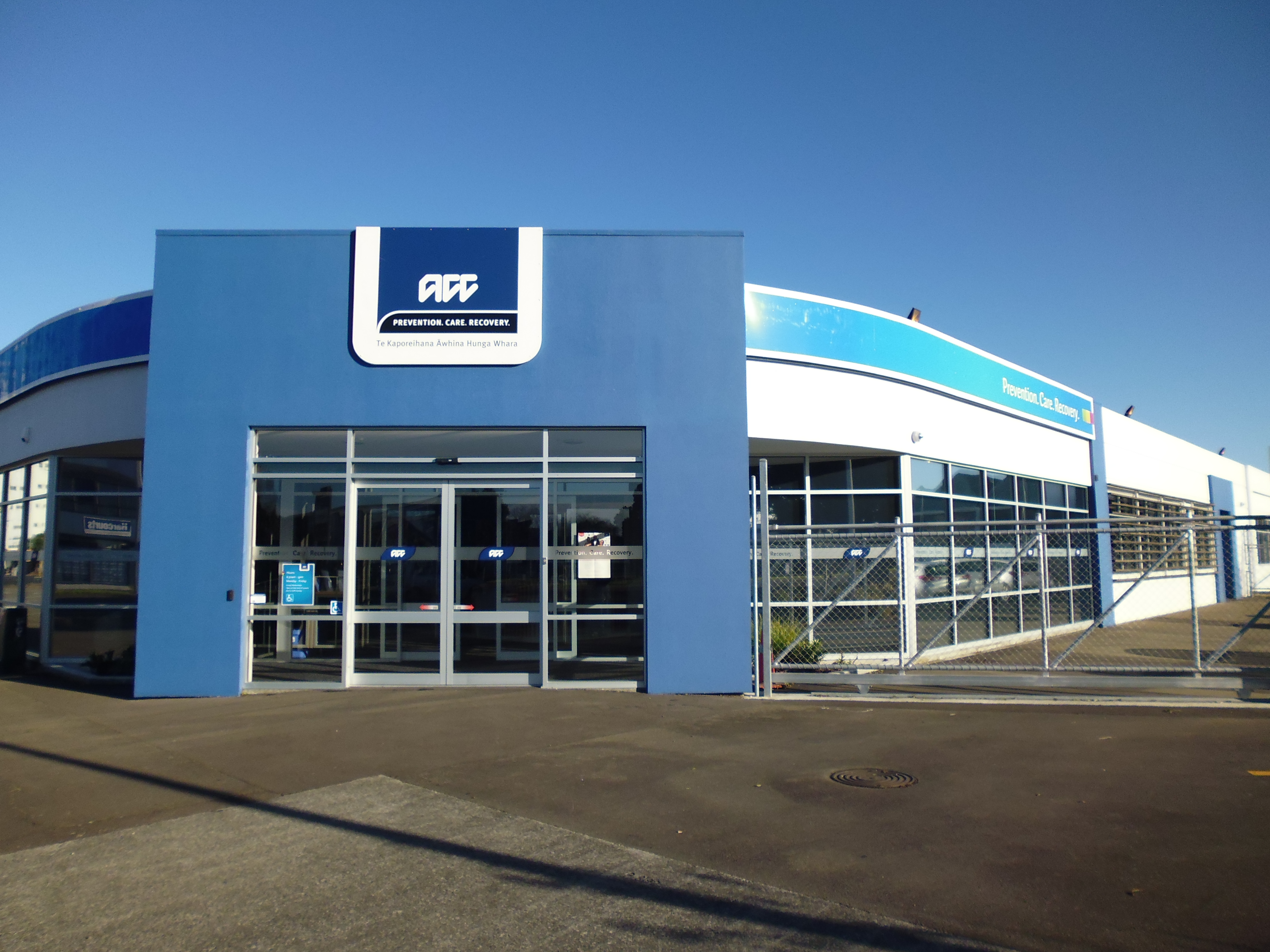
Palmerston North offices

ACC initially had a "fully funded" model whereby sufficient levies were collected to cover the lifetime cost of each injury, which might require compensation over a period of 30 years or more. The scheme was shifted to a "pay-as-you-go" funding model, where the scheme collects enough levies during a year to cover the cost of claims for that particular year, in 1982. The “fully funded” model was restored in 1999. However, getting ACC onto a strong financial footing was not easy and in 2009, ACC posted a $4.8 billion loss—at the time described as the biggest corporate loss in New Zealand's history. This cost escalation is thought to have been due to an increase in the number of claims, a widening of entitlements and increased costs of meeting the claims. Another factor was physiotherapy services being made free at the point of delivery leading to over-servicing of clients. Between 2000 and 2008 this appears to have contributed to an increase in physiotherapy costs of 214%.

The 100% reimbursement scheme for physiotherapist services was ended, and ACC levies on wages and motorists were increased. ACC chairman John Judge told the Sunday Star-Times that it was going to take a "hard-nosed" approach to get ACC into a sustainable position. This would require "substantial" levy increases and "legislative change to get people off the scheme and back to work quicker". By 2012, ACC had made good progress towards its 2019-goal (of being fully funded), and was $4.5 billion short of matching liabilities ($28.5b) with its assets ($24b).

Towards the end of 2012, ACC Minister Judith Collins announced that Government would not cut ACC levies for the 2013–14 year. While the ACC Board and Ministry of Business Innovation and Employment had recommended reducing the levies by between 12 and 17 per cent, Collins stated that the government's decision was motivated by the uncertain economic conditions and a desire to ensure that reductions to the levy were sustainable. Andrew Little, the Labour Party's ACC spokesman, criticised this decision, claiming that it was driven by the government's attempt to bring the budget into surplus and reducing the levy would provide a boost to the economy. In the 2013 budget, Collins announced a $1.3 billion cut in ACC levies over the next two years. Collins said the Earners and Workers accounts were now fully funded after the Corporation reduced the number of long term ACC claimants from 14,000 to less than 11,000.

In 2015/16, ACC's outstanding claims liability (OCL) increased by $6.4 billion, which lead to a net deficit of $3.4 billion. The OCL measures the future cost of all existing ACC claims. That year also saw 1.93 million claims accepted; a 5.2% increase from the previous year. $3.5 billion was paid out to all new and existing claims. There has been some conjecture over whether or not ACC staff were paid incentives to remove long term clients off weekly compensation. This was refuted by Ex-CEO Ralph Stewart in 2012. That year there were 10,400 long-term claimants registered with ACC—down by over 1,000.

In 2019, ACC posted a record $8.7 billion loss.

=== Investments ===
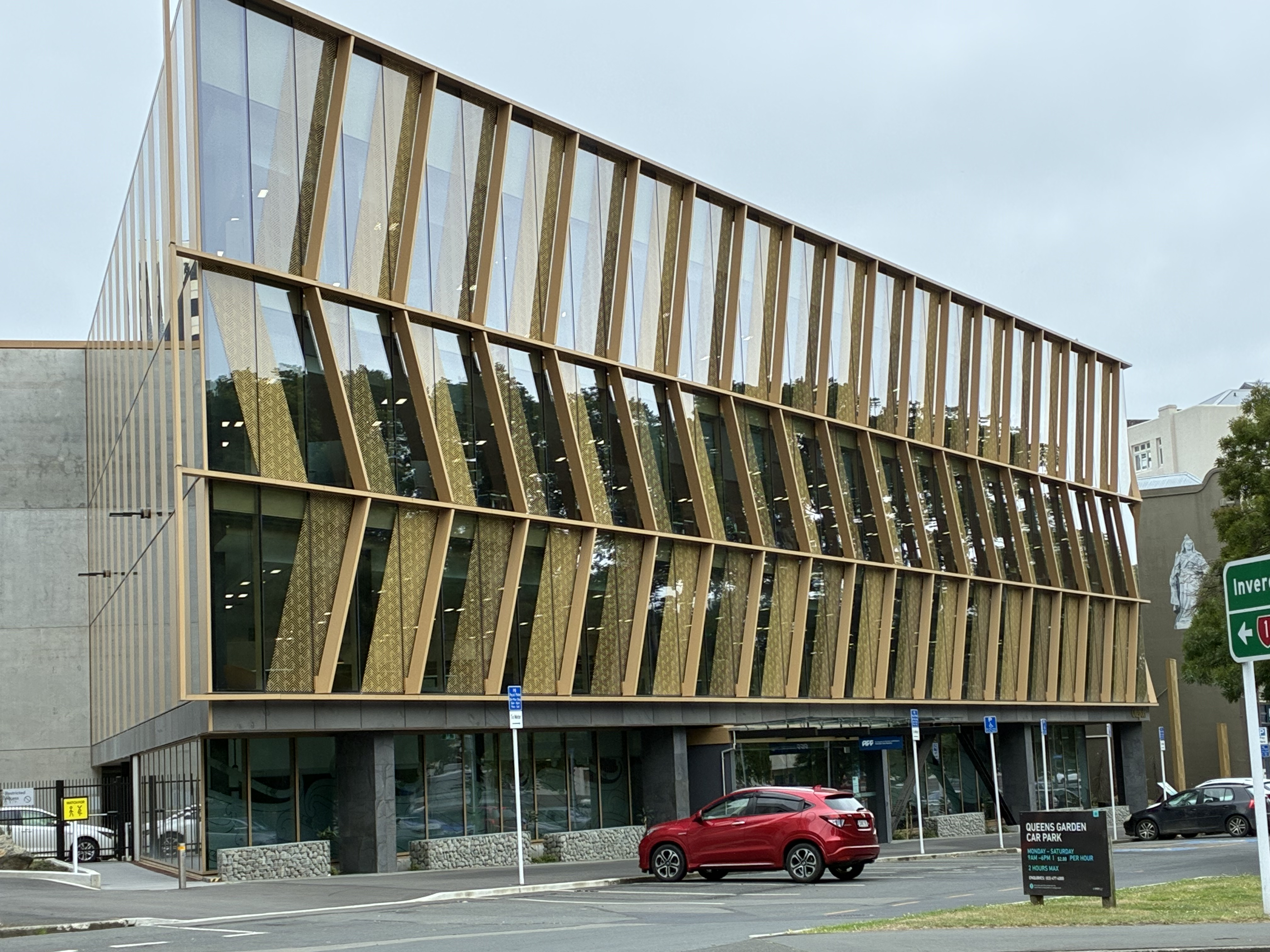
The ACC Ōtepoti building in Dunedin opened in August 2025, and is a four-storey building with a facade resembling a pou (flax basket).

ACC invests the premium it collects in various ventures. It has a portfolio of $40b and its investment manager was believed to be the highest paid public servant in New Zealand. Of its top 50 investments, 47 are listed companies in NZ and overseas. Notable exceptions include a 22% shareholding in Kiwibank and the consortiums building Transmission Gully Motorway and the Puhoi to Wellsford Motorway.

ACC has attracted controversy at several junctures since its establishment due to the nature of some its investment decisions. In 2003 Green Party MP Sue Bradford revealed that ACC held investments in brewery industry giants DB Breweries and Lion Nathan, which she claimed contravened ACC's legal obligation to engage in ethical investments to protect New Zealand's global reputation. In 2016 ACC admitted it had indirectly invested in six companies on its own exclusion list, including weapons manufacturer Lockheed Martin and British Tobacco. ACC's ethical investment policy was drawn into question again in 2019, when Green Party MP Chlöe Swarbrick publicly criticised the Crown Entity for continued investment in fossil fuels, arguing that in light of the climate emergency this investment was unethical and that divestment should take place according to the precedent set by its exclusion of investment in tobacco companies.

=== Cover for the self-employed ===
ACC CoverPlus Extra was introduced by ACC to provide cover for self-employed workers and business owners that would fail to otherwise be covered adequately by the standard ACC CoverPlus policy. It works by paying an agreed level of compensation, in the event of an injury resulting in time off from work.

With this cover already agreed upon, any business would not have to prove loss of income and has certainty on their amount of cover in the event of an accident-related injury. The ACC CoverPlus policy was designed to cover employees at 80% of their net taxable income. With ACC CoverPlus Extra, a self-employed contractor would get 100% of the pre-agreed compensation paid until they were fit to return to full-time work. A business owner would be able to get compensation under ACC CoverPlus Extra even if the business continued to earn income whilst the business owner could not work because of injury. This would not be possible with the standard policy.

=== Accredited Employers' Programme ===
ACC allows certain companies to manage and fund the claims of its employees who are injured at work. In return, they are given a large discount in ACC premium. ACC says this provides companies with a financial incentive to have good health and safety practices at work. More than 140 New Zealand employers participate in this programme. ACC Futures Coalition and Green Party criticize this programme because creates a conflict interest for employers to wrongly deny claims and say it should be cancelled.

== Notable events ==
=== Violence against staff ===
ACC clients have occasionally threatened or attempted to harm ACC staff. In 1999, a staff member was fatally stabbed by a claimant at an ACC office in Henderson. In 2010, ACC logos were removed from company vehicles after several staff had their cars rammed or were "driven off the road by other drivers". The following year a threat against former chief executive Ralph Stewart led to a decision for security staff to be posted outside his home. There have been at least two threats to blow up a car bomb outside ACC offices and police have had to be called on several other occasions. In 2012, there were a total of 134 recorded threats made against staff—the majority against case managers "making difficult decisions".

=== Client fraud ===
In 2013, it was reported that 64 people have been convicted of defrauding ACC of a total of more than $10 million over the past four years. This includes clients claiming they were "injured" but who kept working while receiving ACC benefits and medical practitioners who billed ACC for more treatment than they actually provided. Another category of ACC fraudster includes widows who continued claiming payments after their (injured) partners have subsequently died. Sometimes these payments went on for nearly 30 years before the fraud came to light, with one woman having received nearly $150,000 after her husband had died.

=== Staff fraud ===
ACC staff have defrauded the corporation on a number of occasions. Jeffrey Chapman, former ACC chief executive from 1985 to 1992, was imprisoned for defrauding ACC and other government agencies; Gavin Robins, his successor from 1993 to 1997, was also charged with fraud but was acquitted. In 2011, a senior manager was convicted of dishonesty offences involving property leased to ACC by private business interests. In late 2012, Jonathan Wright, an ACC-contracted medical assessor, was convicted of dishonestly obtaining over $18,000 in falsified travel expenses from ACC.

=== Treatment-injury claims ===
A treatment injury is one caused in the course of treatment by a registered health professional, and are not a necessary part or ordinary consequence of the treatment. Until 2005, these were called "medical misadventure" claims. Treatment injury covers harm during a procedure, misdiagnosis, failure in care such as delay in treatment. It is the treatment provider that lodges the claim with ACC. The Accident Compensation Corporation will then investigate the claim and either accept or decline the claim.

=== Bronwyn Pullar privacy breach ===
ACC has had a number of breaches of privacy relating to claimants. The most significant occurred in 2011 after the release of details of 6700 claimants to an ACC claimant, Bronwyn Pullar. Pullar had been battling ACC since suffering a head injury in 2002—and had 45 separate complaints against the agency—only one of which was about the privacy breaches. In 2011 she and former National Party president Michelle Boag, had a meeting with two senior ACC managers to discuss her concerns. ACC referred the matter to the police claiming Pullar had threatened to go to the media about the privacy breaches if she didn't get what she wanted. The police listened to a tape recording of the meeting and decided there was no case to answer.

In March 2012, ACC Minister Nick Smith resigned from Cabinet after it was revealed that he had written letters on behalf of Pullar, who was a personal friend of his, while he was ACC Minister. ACC chairman John Judge continued to insist his version of events was correct and as a result ACC Minister Judith Collins did not renew his tenure on the ACC Board. The chief executive of ACC, Ralph Stewart, also resigned the next day. Three other board members—Murray Hilder, Rob Campbell, and John McCliskie—also resigned.

The fallout from the affair continued in May 2012, when Collins sued Labour MPs Trevor Mallard and Andrew Little for defamation over comments they made on Radio New Zealand broadcasts linking her to the leak of an email from Michelle Boag following the release of the files. The case was settled after a High Court hearing in November 2012. An independent review of ACC was conducted toward the end of 2012; it found the organisation "lacked a comprehensive strategy for protecting and managing claimants' information" and said ACC had an "almost cavalier" attitude toward its clients. The review showed that the culture within ACC enabled its staff to target clients involved in privacy breaches and complaints rather than demonstrating respect for claimants. In 2013, a "training academy" for staff was mooted, with an "emphasis on a client-centred approach".

== List of ministers ==
The following ministers have held responsibility for the Accident Compensation Corporation. Ministerial responsibility was held prior by the Minister of Labour.

Key

Labour National

No.	Name	Portrait	Term of Office		Prime Minister
1	Bill Birch		2 November 1990	29 November 1993	Bolger
2	Bruce Cliffe		29 November 1993	29 June 1995	Bolger
3	Doug Kidd		29 June 1995	16 December 1996	Bolger
4	Jenny Shipley		16 December 1996	8 December 1997	Bolger
5	Murray McCully		8 December 1997	10 December 1999	Shipley
6	Michael Cullen		10 December 1999	27 March 2001	Clark
7	Lianne Dalziel		28 March 2001	15 August 2002	Clark
8	Ruth Dyson		15 August 2002	5 November 2007	Clark
9	Maryan Street		5 November 2007	19 November 2008	Clark
10	Nick Smith		19 November 2008	12 December 2011	Key
11	Judith Collins		12 December 2011	30 August 2014	Key
12	Nikki Kaye		6 October 2014	20 December 2016	Key
12	Nikki Kaye		6 October 2014	20 December 2016	English
13	Michael Woodhouse		20 December 2016	26 October 2017	English
14	Iain Lees-Galloway		26 October 2017	22 July 2020	Ardern
15	Carmel Sepuloni		6 November 2020	1 February 2023	Ardern
15	Carmel Sepuloni		6 November 2020	1 February 2023	Hipkins
16	Peeni Henare		1 February 2023	27 November 2023	Hipkins
17	Matt Doocey		27 November 2023	24 January 2025	Luxon
18	Andrew Bayly		24 January 2025	24 February 2025	Luxon
19	Scott Simpson		24 February 2025	present	Luxon

== See also ==
- Tort reform
- Atiyah's Accidents, Compensation and the Law
