= American Tort Reform Association =

The American Tort Reform Association (ATRA) is a nonprofit, nonpartisan organization dedicated to reforming the civil justice system and advocating for tort reform. It was founded in 1986 by the American Council of Engineering Companies and was joined shortly thereafter by the American Medical Association.

== Issues ==
ATRA's members are largely Fortune 500 companies. Although sponsored by major industries, ATRA has worked hard to present a dramatically different public image of itself, claiming to represent small businesses and average citizens.

The ATRA supports an agenda to increase public awareness of, and suggest changes in, the manner in which tort litigation is conducted in the United States. Some of these proposed changes would effectively limit the ability of tort plaintiffs to recover against tortfeasors. Examples include:

- Limitations on liability for medical malpractice
- Abolition of the rule of joint and several liability
- Abolition of the collateral source doctrine
- Limitations on punitive damages
- Limitations on noneconomic damages
- Changes in products liability law
- Greater skepticism in the admission of expert testimony
- Stopping so-called "regulation through litigation"
- Promotion of jury service

ATRA is trying to reform the following aspects of the civil legal system: appeal bonds, class action lawsuits, contingent fees, forums and venues, joint and several liabilities, judgment interest, jury service, medical liability, noneconomic damages, phantom damages, product liability, punitive damages, and teacher liability protection.

ATRA has identified attorney misconduct as a part of the problem with the tort system and displayed a billboard targeting a particular "unethical lawyer."

ATRA opposed legislation in Missouri that would eliminate statute of limitations for victims of childhood sexual abuse. The group negotiated language to extend the statute by ten years rather than eliminating it.

== Annual recognitions ==
At the end of every year since 2002, ATRA publishes its annual Judicial Hellholes report, which is a list of locales that ATRA calls the worst courts in the United States. The 2019-2020 report lists the Philadelphia Court of Common Pleas as the worst court in the country. Prior to 2020, the No. 1 Judicial Hellhole according to ATRA was the state of California. The other "judicial hellholes" listed in the 2019-2020 report were California; New York City; Louisiana; the City of St. Louis, Missouri; Georgia; Cook, Madison and St. Clair Counties in Illinois; Oklahoma; the Minnesota Supreme Court and the Twin Cities; and, the New Jersey Legislature.

ATRA also awards the Civil Justice Achievement Award annually. Winners include Charlie Ross, Walter Olson, Paul Coverdell, Bill Pryor, and John H. Sullivan.
