= Atiyah's Accidents, Compensation and the Law =

1970 legal text by Patrick Atiyah

- Title page for Atiyah's Accidents, Compensation and the Law (4th edition)
- Author: Patrick Atiyah
- Language: English
- Genre: Legal
- Publisher: Cambridge University Press
- Publication date: 1970

Atiyah's Accidents, Compensation and the Law is a legal text originally authored by English legal scholar Patrick Atiyah in 1970. The thrust of the book is that the law of tort should be abolished, especially as relates to the law on personal injuries, and should be replaced with a no fault state compensation system. Its arguments are in tune with the establishment in the 1970s of such a system in New Zealand, with the Accident Compensation Commission.

== Publication history ==
The work has been edited by Peter Cane without Atiyah's assistance since the 4th edition in 1987.

The 2006 edition marked the first of Cambridge University Press's "Law in Context" series.

== Contents ==
One of the book's main point is its stinging criticism of the fault principle. This is the principle that finds the party that is to blame before compensating the victim in personal injury cases. This then implies that if fault cannot be attributed, there can be no attribution of liability, and thus a victim of an accident may not receive compensation. Atiyah proposed six major criticisms of the system, which suggest that liability in personal injury claims should not focus on the relationship between the claimant and defendant, but between the parties and society. His examples were primarily concerned with road traffic accidents

1. The compensation payable bears no relation to the degree of fault. This refers to the fact that, according to research, for every crash on the roads, there are 122 near misses—is it fair that the person unfortunate to have the accident should have to bear full burden, when the other 122 drivers were simply luckier?
2. The compensation bears no relation to the means of the Defendant. This refers to the fact that there are uniform levels of compensation for personal injury in English law, and that if a defendant is forced to sell their home in order to fund a payout, they will have suffered considerably more than an affluent defendant, who can easily afford the payments.
3. The Fault Principle is not a moral principle because a Defendant may be negligent without being morally culpable and vice versa. Atiyah pointed out that if the focus of the fault principle was to punish the offending party, why is there vicarious liability, and liability insurance, which allow the actual wrongdoer to escape paying the victim's compensation. He was also highly critical of the decision in Nettleship v. Weston [1971], because it imposed liability onto a learner driver defendant, where moral culpability could not be established.
4. The Fault principle pays insufficient attention to the conduct or needs of the Claimant. Atiyah was concerned that finding a liable defendant was held in higher esteem than compensating the victim. For example, if no liable defendant was found, and the Claimant was also wholly blameless, they would be entitled to no compensation, whereas if the claimant was mostly to blame for an accident, they would still recover some compensation if someone else was also partly to blame.
5. Justice may require payment of compensation without fault. Atiyah quoted the case of Bolton v. Stone [1951] as an example of where a policy decision deferred a defendant's liability, and therefore the victim's payout. If there was no fault liability, then the case would not even have gone to court.
6. Fault is an unsatisfactory criterion for liability because of the difficulties caused in adjudicating on it. The Fault principle means that one of the parties to the case must be found to be at fault, and even that can be difficult to determine because of witness evidence that has been demonstrated to be unreliable. Atiyah was concerned that if the court finds one party to be at fault, then the wider community is effectively absolved of liability. As an example, he suggested that rather than spending money, time and resources in courts to blame a driver for a road accident, society should strive to make the roads and cars safer to avoid a similar accident in the future. If society rejects this, then why should that particular driver be found to be responsible for an accident that may have been able to be avoided?

== Atiyah's later thought ==
After handing over the book, Atiyah changed his mind, and wrote The Damages Lottery (1997) where instead of a state run system, he advocated abolition of tort and that people should buy personal safety insurance. Professor Cane, however has kept Atiyah's Accidents in line with the title's original thesis.

== See also ==
- Tort reform
