= Special motion to strike =

Legal motion intended to stop SLAPP lawsuits

The special motion to strike is a motion authorized by the California Code of Civil Procedure intended to stop strategic lawsuits against public participation (SLAPPs). They were created in 1992 with the purpose of encouraging participation in matters of public significance. The motion allows a litigant to strike a complaint when it arises from conduct in furtherance of the moving party's rights to petition or free speech in connection with a public issue. If the moving party prevails, they are entitled to attorney's fees by right. The motion is codified in section 425.16 of the Code. More than 300 published court opinions have interpreted and applied California's anti-SLAPP law. The Ninth Circuit previously held that the right to file a special motion to strike is a substantive immunity to suit, rather than a merely procedural right, and so applied the law to apply the law to state law claims they heard under diversity jurisdiction. However, sitting en banc, it overruled this decision in 2025.

The statute expressly applies to any writing or speech made in connection with an issue under consideration or review by a legislative, executive, or judicial proceeding, or any other official proceeding authorized by law, but there is no requirement that the writing or speech be promulgated directly to the official body. It also applies to speech in a public forum about an issue of public interest and to any other petition or speech conduct about an issue of public interest.

== Procedure ==
To prevail on a special motion to strike, the moving party in the action must first show that the lawsuit is based on claims related to their exercise of their rights to free speech or petition. If this is demonstrated, then the burden shifts to the plaintiff to affirmatively present evidence demonstrating a reasonable probability of succeeding in their case by showing an actual wrong would exist as recognized by law, if the facts claimed were borne out.

The filing of an anti-SLAPP motion stays all discovery. This feature acts to greatly reduce the cost of litigation to the anti-SLAPP defendant, as discovery is generally the most expensive and most time-consuming aspect of litigation. While this would be inconsequential for most pre-discovery motions, special motions to strike are disposed of on the basis of admissible evidence, rather than the allegations on the face of the complaint. This greatly differs from a regular motion to strike or most other pre-discovery pleadings and motions, which generally tend to be based primarily on legal, not factual, disputes.

However, because discovery is limited after a special motion to strike is filed, the nonmoving party must show only 'minimal merit' to prevail against a motion, and all inferences from the evidence must be in favor of the plaintiff. Nonmoving parties may obtain some limited discovery pursuant to section 425.16 subd. (g) of the Code if they can demonstrate that the party from whom discovery is sought has the evidence which would allow them to establish a prima facie case, as well as articulate the specific facts the party may uncover.

The motion may be filed within 60 days of when the complaint is served on the moving party. When filed, a copy of the first page of the motion must be transmitted to the Judicial Council of California via e-mail of facsimile. Similarly, the first page of any opposition, as well as the entirety of any notice of appeal, petition for writ or order issued on the motion must also be transmitted when filed.

After an anti-SLAPP motion has been filed, a plaintiff cannot escape this mandatory fee award by amending its complaint. However, the plaintiff may dismiss the case "prior to a time when the procedural posture was such that plaintiff would inevitably lose".

If the special motion to strike is denied, the order denying the motion is immediately appealable. Defendants prevailing on an anti-SLAPP motion (including any subsequent appeal) are entitled to a mandatory award of reasonable attorney's fees. Unlike the typical role of appeals courts, which review evidentiary decisions for abuse of discretion and error, appeals from special motions to strike are reviewed de novo by the Court of Appeal.

=== Attorney's fees ===
The special motion to strike is notable amongst other motions which provide for fee-shifting, because the moving party, if successful, is entitled to its reasonable attorney's fees as a matter of right, and need not show that the lawsuit was brought in bad faith. On the contrary, the nonmoving party must prove that the motion was frivolous or solely intended to cause unnecessary delay in order to prevail.

However, the moving party is not entitled to attorney's fees even if they prevail if the action was brought based on the California Public Records Act, or an action brought by the state Attorney General or any interested person to enforce the Bagley-Keene Act or Brown Act.

== Limitations on use ==
On September 6, 2003, the Legislature amended the statute in order to address what it found to be abuse of the motion, adding a variety of exceptions. If a motion is denied on the basis that the action is excepted, the denial of the motion may not be appealed.

=== Public interest and class-action lawsuits ===
The motion may not be used in any action brought 'solely in the public interest or on behalf of the general public', so long as the plaintiff does not seek any relief for themself greater than the relief they seek for others and can establish all of the following:

- the action is intended to enforce an important right affecting the public interest;
- the action would confer a significant benefit on the general public or a large class of persons
- private enforcement is necessary and has resulted in a disproportionate financial burden to the plaintiff.

=== Commercial speech ===
The motion may not be used by a defendant engaged in the business of selling or leasing goods or services if the plaintiff can establish the following:

- the statement or conduct on which the lawsuit is based consists of factual representations about the nonmoving party's own or a business competitor's business operations, goods or services, so long as those statements were:
  - made for the purpose of obtaining approval for, promoting, or securing sales or leases of, or commercial transactions in the person's goods or services, or
  - the statement or conduct was made in the course of delivering the goods and services, and
- the intended audience is an actual or potential customer, or a person likely to repeat the statement to, or influence an actual or potential customer, or the statement arose out of or within the context of a regulatory approval process.

This exception does not apply when a telephone company sues a competitor based on a statement made in the course of a proceeding before the California Public Utilities Commission.

=== Exceptions ===
These exceptions themselves do not apply to:

- journalists, as defined in the Constitution and the Evidence Code, or "any person engaged in the dissemination of ideas or expression in any book or academic journal, while engaged in the gathering, receiving, or processing of information for communication to the public".
- Any action against any person or entity based upon the creation, dissemination, exhibition, advertisement, or other similar promotion of any dramatic, literary, musical, political, or artistic work.
- Any nonprofit organization that receives more than 50 percent of its annual revenues from federal, state, or local government grants, awards, programs, or reimbursements for services rendered.

The constitutionality of the nonprofit organization exclusion has been questioned by some law firms, as government-sponsored nonprofit corporations such as the California appellate projects would be granted such immunity, but largely private-funded nonprofits such as the American Civil Liberties Union would not.

== Malicious prosecution ==
Section 425.18, signed into law on October 6, 2005, was enacted to allow SLAPP victims to recover their damages through a malicious prosecution action against the SLAPP filers and their attorneys after the underlying lawsuit has been dismissed. Although such lawsuits may still be subject to special motions to strike, the timeline for such motions are greatly expanded (for example, the motion may be filed within 120 days of service of the complaint, as opposed to 30 for regular motions) and the moving party has no right to an immediate appeal if they do not prevail; however, they may file a petition for writ of mandate within 20 days.
