= Collateral source rule =

Doctrine used in American case law

The collateral source rule, or collateral source doctrine, is an American case law evidentiary rule that prohibits the admission of evidence that the plaintiff or victim has received compensation from some source other than the damages sought against the defendant. The purpose of the rule is to ensure that the wrongful party pays the full cost of the harm caused, so that future harmful conduct is thereby deterred or, at least, fully included in the defendant's cost of doing business. Subrogation and indemnification principles then commonly provide that the person who paid the initial compensation to the plaintiff or victim has a right to recover any double recovery from the plaintiff or victim. For example, in a personal injury action, evidence that the plaintiff's medical bills were paid by medical insurance, or by workers' compensation, is not generally admissible and the plaintiff can recover the amount of those bills from the defendant. If the plaintiff then collects the amount of medical bills from the defendant, that amount is then typically paid by the plaintiff to the insurance carrier under principles of subrogation and indemnification.

The collateral source doctrine has come under attack by tort reform advocates. They argue that if the plaintiff's injuries and damages have already been compensated, it is unfair and duplicative to allow an award of damages against the tortfeasor. As a result some states have altered or partially abrogated the rule by statute. Proponents of the rule note that without it, the wrongdoer [tortfeasor] gets the benefit of the injured party carrying insurance or obtaining minimal benefits through government programs and obtains a form of subsidy where the wrongdoer does not pay the full cost of their wrongful conduct but instead transfers some of that cost [insurance premiums] to the victims causing insurance rates to be higher.

Nevertheless, some courts have held that the rule ought not to provide a safe haven in a contract action for an unfaithful contracting party.
