= Judgment proof =

Term for insolvent defendants in contract law

In the context of contract law, debt collection and civil litigation, the term judgment proof is commonly used to refer to defendants or potential defendants who are financially insolvent, or whose income and assets cannot be obtained in satisfaction of a judgment.

Being "judgment proof" is not a defense to a lawsuit. If sued, the defendant cannot claim being "judgment proof" as an affirmative defense. The term "judgment proof" instead refers to the inability of the judgment holder to obtain satisfaction of the judgment.

If a plaintiff were to secure a legal judgment against an insolvent defendant, the defendant's lack of funds would make the satisfaction of that judgment difficult, if not impossible, to secure.

== Exempt assets ==
In some jurisdictions, some classes of income and assets are exempt from being accessed to pay a judgment. If a judgment debtor has income, it may be possible to get an order of garnishment to collect a judgment from that source of income. However, if the debtor's income is low or if the debtor is already subject to garnishment, in order to prevent the impoverishment of the debtor, the debtor's income may be exempt from additional garnishment.

=== United States ===
Some states do not permit wage garnishment. If the debtor is living on income from social security benefits, a retirement pension, or other social welfare, garnishment may not be possible, as such income is usually protected against garnishment by creditors.

== Cost of collection ==
The cost of collecting a judgment may also contribute to an assessment of whether a debtor is judgment-proof. If the amount that a judgment holder is able to collect from the debtor is insufficient to cover ongoing legal expenses and related costs of collection, collection efforts become uneconomical.

== See also ==
- Writ of execution
