= United Country Real Estate =

American real estate marketing company

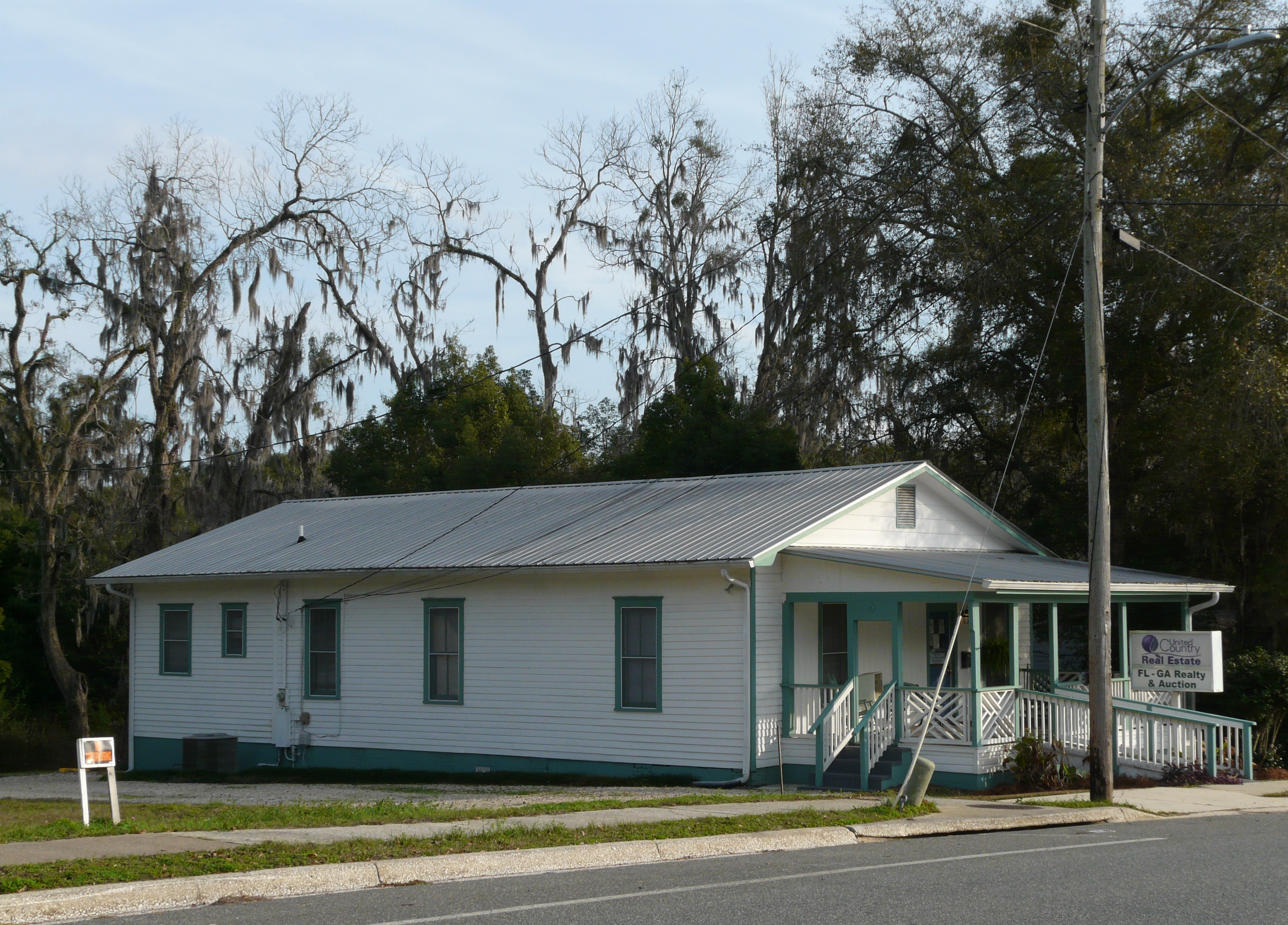
- United Country affiliate in Monticello, Florida
- Type: Private
- Industry: Real estate Marketing
- Founded: 1925; 101 years ago
- Founder: Roscoe Chamberlain
- Headquarters: Kansas City, United States
- Number of locations: 511 (2012)
- Area served: United States
- Key people: Mike Duffy (President)
- Website: unitedcountry.com

United Country Real Estate is an American franchise-based real estate marketing company. It provides leads, marketing programs, training, and technology to affiliated realtors that pay a franchise fee.

The company operates more than 3,000 websites targeting local markets. The sites collectively obtain 2.9 million monthly unique visitors.

The company's franchise system provides significant support in terms of marketing, technology, and training. From a marketing standpoint, United Country publishes catalogs and listings, pays for advertising, develops marketing programs, creates brochures, postcards and email content, provides computer systems and support.

United Country also offers an in-house real estate advertising agency, Enhanced Marketing Solutions. Its focus is on rural real estate, such as farms, ranches, country homes, and small town or lakeside property, as opposed to urban and suburban real estate.

== History ==
United Country Real Estate was founded in 1925 with a focus on farms and ranches in rural towns by Roscoe Chamberlain out of a Kansas City bank. It published the first rural properties catalog in 1928, which was put on display at the Smithsonian in 1981. In 1951, Chamberlain's son, Robert M. Chamberlain, became the president of the company.

Founded under the name United Farm Real Estate, it changed names to United National Real Estate to reflect its expansion into suburban neighborhoods in 1986.

The company was acquired by a management group in 1990 and changed its name again to United Country seven years later. United Country Real Estate had approximately 150 franchises by 1997 and 300 by 1999.

This grew to 700 franchise members by 2007, when Dan Duffy and his investment partners acquired the company. In 2010 the organization raised $1 million in funding to expand its web presence for suburban areas with a local population of 50,000 or more. Two years later, United Real Estate was launched, which built "United Lounges," which provide an office facility for affiliated realtors, in Houston, Chicago, Philadelphia and Washington.

As of 2013, it has 4,000 participating real-estate agents. In 2015, the company partnered with McCarthy Capital Fund V to expand plans for growth. Existing management increased its ownership as part of the transaction and will remain in place without exception. Today, the company operates under the name United Country Real Estate and specializes in "lifestyle", country and small town properties around the country and in Mexico and Central America.
