= Franchise agreement =

A franchise agreement is a legal, binding contract between a franchisor and franchisee. In the United States franchise agreements are enforced at the State level.

Prior to a franchisee signing a contract, the US Federal Trade Commission regulates information disclosures under the authority of The Franchise Rule. The Franchise Rule requires a franchisee be supplied a Franchise Disclosure Document (FDD) (originally called Uniform Franchise Offering Circular (UFOC)) prior to signing a franchise agreement, a minimum of fourteen days before signing a franchise agreement.

Once the Federal ten-day waiting period has passed, the Franchise Agreement becomes a State level jurisdiction document. Each state has unique laws regarding franchise agreements.

A franchise agreement contents can vary significantly in content depending upon the franchise system, the state jurisdiction of the franchisor, franchisee, and arbitrator.

It overall provides the investor with a product, a branded name and recognition, and a support system.

A typical franchise agreement contains

- [Franchise Disclosure Document (FDD)
- Disclosures required by state laws
- Parties defined in the agreement
- Recitals, such as Ownership of System, and Objectives of Parties
- Definitions, such as

Agreement, Territory Area, Area Licensee, Authorized deductions, Gross Receipts, License Network, The System Manual, Trademarks, Start Date, Trade name, Termination, Transfer of license.

- Licensed Rights, such as

Territory, Rights Reserved, Term and Renewal, Minimum Performance Standard

- Franchisors Services, such as

Administration, Collections and Billing, Consultation, Marketing, Manual, Training and Vendor Negotiation

- Franchisee Payments, such as

Initial Franchise Fee, Training Fees, Marketing Fund, Royalties, Renewal fee, and Transfer fee

- Franchisee Obligations, such as

Use of Trademarks, Financial Information, Insurance, Financial and Legal responsibility

- Relationship of Parties, such as

Confidentiality, Indemnification, Non-Compete clauses

- Transfer of License, such as

Consent of franchisor, Termination of license, Termination by licensee

- Other provisions
- Governing law
- Amendments
- Waivers
- Arbitration
- Severability

== See also ==
- American Association of Franchisees and Dealers
- Franchise consulting
- Franchise Disclosure Document
- Franchise fraud
- Franchise termination
- Franchising
- List of franchises
- The Franchise Rule
- U.S. Securities and Exchange Commission
