= White-collar crime =

Financially motivated nonviolent crime

The term "white-collar crime" refers to financially motivated, nonviolent or non-directly violent crime committed by individuals, businesses and government professionals. The crimes are believed to be committed by middle- or upper-class individuals for financial gains. It was first defined by the sociologist Edwin Sutherland in 1939 as "a crime committed by a person of respectability and high social status in the course of their occupation". Typical white-collar crimes could include wage theft, fraud, bribery, Ponzi schemes, insider trading, labor racketeering, embezzlement, cybercrime, copyright infringement, money laundering, identity theft, and forgery. White-collar crime overlaps with corporate crime.

== Definitional issues ==
Modern criminology generally prefers to classify the type of crime and the topic:

- By the type of offense, e.g., property crime, economic crime, and other corporate crimes like environmental and health and safety law violations. Some crimes are only possible because of the offender's identity, e.g., transnational money laundering requires the participation of senior officers employed in banks. However, the FBI has adopted the narrow approach, defining white-collar crime as "those illegal acts which are characterized by deceit, concealment, or violation of trust and which are not dependent upon the application or threat of physical force or violence" (1989, 3). While the true extent and cost of white-collar crime are unknown, the FBI and the Association of Certified Fraud Examiners estimate the annual cost to the United States to fall between $300 and $660 billion.
- By the type of offender, e.g., by social class or high socioeconomic status, the occupation of positions of trust or profession, or academic qualification, researching the motivations for criminal behavior, e.g., greed or fear of loss of face if economic difficulties become obvious. Shover and Wright point to the essential neutrality of a crime as enacted in a statute. It almost inevitably describes conduct in the abstract, not by reference to the character of the persons performing it. Thus, the only way that one crime differs from another is in the backgrounds and characteristics of its perpetrators.
- By organizational culture rather than the offender or offense which overlaps with organized crime. Appelbaum and Chambliss offer a twofold definition:
  - Occupational crime occurs when crimes are committed to promote personal interests, say, by altering records and overcharging, or by cheating of clients by professionals.
  - Organizational or corporate crime occurs when corporate executives commit criminal acts to benefit their company by overcharging or price fixing, false advertising, etc.

== Relationship to other types of crime ==
=== Corporate crime ===
Corporate crime benefits the corporation (company or other type of business organization), rather than individuals. It may, however, result from the decisions of high-ranking individuals within the corporation. Corporations are not, unlike individuals, litigated in criminal courts, which means the term "crime" does not really apply. Litigation usually takes place in civil courts or by institutions with jurisdiction over specific types of offences, such as the U.S. Securities and Exchange Commission which litigates violations of financial market and investment statutes.

=== State-corporate crime ===
State-corporate crime is “illegal or socially injurious actions that occur when one or more institutions or political governance pursue a goal in direct cooperation with one or more institutions of economic production and distribution.” The negotiation of agreements between a state and a corporation will be at a relatively senior level on both sides, this is almost exclusively a white-collar "situation" which offers the opportunity for crime. Although law enforcement claims to have prioritized white-collar crime, evidence shows that it continues to be a low priority.

When senior levels of a corporation engage in criminal activity using the company this is sometimes called control fraud.

=== Organized transnational crime ===
Organized transnational crime is organized criminal activity that takes place across national jurisdictions, and with advances in transportation and information technology, law enforcement officials and policymakers have needed to respond to this form of crime on a global scale. Some examples include human trafficking, money laundering, drug smuggling, illegal arms dealing, terrorism, and cybercrime. Although it is impossible to precisely gauge transnational crime, the Millennium Project, an international think tank, assembled statistics on several aspects of transnational crime in 2009:

- World illicit trade of almost $780 billion
- Counterfeiting and piracy of $300 billion to $1 trillion
- Global drug trade of $321 billion

=== Red-collar crime ===
When a white-collar criminal turns violent, it becomes red-collar crime. This can take the form of killing a witness in a fraud trial to silence them or murdering someone who exposed the fraud, such as a journalist, detective or whistleblower. Perri and Lichtenwald defined red-collar crime as follows:

“This sub-group is referred to as red-collar criminals because they straddle both the white-collar crime arena and, eventually, the violent crime arena. In circumstances where there is the threat of detection, red-collar criminals commit brutal acts of violence to silence the people who have detected their fraud and to prevent further disclosure.”

According to a 2018 report by the Bureau of Labor Statistics, homicide is the third highest cause of death in the American workplace. The Atlantic magazine reported that red-collar criminals often have traits of narcissism and psychopathy, which ironically, are seen as desirable qualities in the recruitment process, even though it puts a company at risk of employing a white-collar criminal.

One investigator, Richard G. Brody, said that the murders might be difficult to detect, being mistaken for accidents or suicides:

“Whenever I read about high-profile executives who are found dead, I immediately think red-collar crime,” he said. “Lots of people are getting away with murder.”

=== Occupational crime ===
Occupational crime is “any act punishable by law that is committed through opportunity created on the course of an occupation that is legal.” Individuals may commit crimes during employment or unemployment. The two most common forms are theft and fraud. Theft can be of varying degrees, from a pencil to furnishings to a car. Insider trading, the trading of stock by someone with access to publicly unavailable information, is a type of fraud.

=== Crimes related to national interests ===
The crimes related to the national interests consist mainly of treason. In the modern world, there are a lot of nations which divide crimes into some laws. "Crimes Related to Inducement of Foreign Aggression" is the crime of communicating with aliens secretly to cause foreign aggression or menace. "Crimes Related to Foreign Aggression" is the treason of cooperating with foreign aggression positively regardless of the national inside and outside. "Crimes Related to Insurrection" is the internal treason. Depending on the country, criminal conspiracy is added to these. One example is Jho Low, a Malaysian businessman and international fugitive who stole billions of US dollars from 1MDB, a Malaysian sovereign wealth fund.

== Demographics ==
According to a 2016 American study,

A considerable percentage of white-collar offenders are gainfully employed middle-aged Caucasian men who usually commit their first white-collar offense sometime between their late thirties through their mid-forties and appear to have middle-class backgrounds. Most have some higher education, are married, and have moderate to strong ties to community, family, and religious organizations. Whitecollar offenders usually have a criminal history, including infractions that span the spectrum of illegality, but many do not overindulge in vice. Recent research examining the five-factor personality trait model determined that white-collar offenders tend to be more neurotic and less agreeable and conscientious than their non-criminal counterparts.

== Punishment ==
In the United States, sentences for white-collar crimes may include a combination of imprisonment, fines, restitution, community service, disgorgement, probation, or other alternative punishment. These punishments grew harsher after the Jeffrey Skilling and Enron scandal, when the Sarbanes–Oxley Act of 2002 was passed by the United States Congress and signed into law by President George W. Bush, defining new crimes and increasing the penalties for crimes such as mail and wire fraud. Sometimes punishment for these crimes could be hard to determine due to the fact that convincing the courts that what the offender has done is challenging within itself. In other countries, such as China, white-collar criminals can be given the death penalty under aggravating circumstances, yet some countries have a maximum of 10–25 years imprisonment. Certain countries like Canada consider the relationship between the parties to be a significant feature of a sentence when there is a breach of trust component involved. Questions about sentencing disparity in white-collar crime continue to be debated. The FBI, concerned with identifying this type of offense, collects statistical information on several different fraud offenses (swindles and cons, credit card or ATM fraud, impersonation, welfare fraud, and wire fraud), bribery, counterfeiting and forgery, and embezzlement.

In the United States, the longest sentences for white-collar crimes have included the following: Sholam Weiss (845 years for racketeering, wire fraud and money laundering in connection with the collapse of National Heritage Life Insurance Company); Norman Schmidt and Charles Lewis (330 years and 30 years, respectively, for "high-yield investment" scheme); Bernard Madoff (150 years for $65 billion fraud scheme); Frederick Brandau (55 years for $117 million Ponzi scheme); Martin Sigillito (40 years for $56 million Ponzi scheme); Eduardo Masferrer (30 years for accounting fraud); Chalana McFarland (30 years for mortgage fraud scheme); Lance Poulsen (30 years for $2.9 billion fraud); Gary Lefkowitz (24 years for $80 million tax fraud).

According to political scientist Marie Gottschalk of the University of Pennsylvania, since the 1970s while the prison population of the United States was rapidly increasing as the U.S. was targeting mostly poor and working class people by harshly punishing street crimes, drug crimes and immigration offenses, there was a simultaneous mass deregulation and decriminalization of white collar and corporate crime "despite a tsunami of elite-level criminal activities by leading banks, accounting firms and major corporations." Sociologist Loïc Wacquant writes that during this time period neoliberalism has not shrunk government but instead set up a "centaur state" with little governmental oversight for those at the top and strict control of those at the bottom.

== Theories ==
From the perspective of an offender, the easiest targets to entrap in "white collar" crime are those with a certain degree of vulnerability or those with symbolic or emotional value to the offender. Examples of these people can be family members, clients, and close friends who are wrapped up in personal or business proceedings with the offender. The way that most criminal operations are conducted is through a series of different particular techniques. In this case, a technique is a certain way to complete a desired task. When one is committing a crime, whether it be shoplifting or tax fraud, it is always easier to successfully pull off the task with experience in the technique. Shoplifters who are experienced at stealing in plain sight are much more successful than those who do not know how to steal. The major difference between a shoplifter and someone committing a white-collar crime is that the techniques used are not physical but instead consist of acts like talking on the phone, writing, and entering data.

Often these criminals utilize the "blame game theory", a theory in which certain strategies are utilized by an organization or business and its members in order to strategically shift blame by pushing responsibility to others or denying misconduct. This theory is particularly used in terms of organizations and indicates that offenders often do not take the blame for their actions. Many members of organizations will try to absolve themselves of responsibility when things go wrong.

Forbes Magazine lays out four theories for what leads a criminal to commit a "white collar" crime. The first is that there are poorly designed job incentives for the criminal. Most finance professionals are given a certain type of compensation or reward for short-term mass profits. If a company incentivizes an employee to help commit a crime, such as assisting in a Ponzi Scheme, many employees will partake in order to receive the reward or compensation. Often, this compensation is given in the form of a cash "bonus" on top of their salaries. By doing a task in order to receive a reward, many employees feel as though they are not responsible for the crime, as they have not ordered it. The "blame game theory" comes into play as those being asked to carry out illegal activities feel as though they can place the blame on their bosses instead of themselves. The second theory is that the company's management is very relaxed when it comes to enforcing ethics. If unethical practices are already commonplace in the business, employees will see that as a "green light" to conduct unethical and unlawful business practices to further the business. This idea also ties into Forbes' third theory, that most stock traders see unethical practices as harmless. Many see white-collar crime as a victimless crime, which is not necessarily true. Since many of these stock traders cannot see the victims of their crimes, it seems as if it hurts no one. The last theory is that many firms have unrealistic, large goals. They preach the mentality that employees should "do what it takes".

== See also ==
- Accounting scandals
- Bernie Madoff
- Con man
- Corporate crime
- The Divide: American Injustice in the Age of the Wealth Gap (2014 book)
- Franchise fraud
- Immigration and Customs Enforcement (ICE)
- Industrial espionage
- INTERPOL
- IRS Criminal Investigation Division (IRS-CID)
- Jordan Belfort
- Office of Criminal Investigations (OCI)
- Organi-cultural deviance
- Penny stock scam
- Pump and dump
- Securities and Exchange Commission (SEC)
- Securities fraud
- Tax evasion
- Terrorist financing
- United States Marshals Service
- United States Postal Inspection Service
- United States Secret Service
- Wood laundering
