= AAFD =

AAFD may refer to:

- American Association of Franchisees and Dealers
- Arab Alliance for Freedom and Democracy
