= Franchise termination =

Business process

Franchise termination is termination of a franchise business license by a franchisor or a franchisee.

The United States Federal Trade Commission administrates oversight of preinvestment franchise disclosures via The Franchise Rule.

Franchise agreements are regulated in the United States under state law, rather than federal law.

== Franchise termination agreement documents ==
Clauses in the franchise agreement will stipulate grounds for termination, remedies against termination, and the process by either the franchisee or franchisor to start termination. Several states in the U.S. restrict terminations unless there is "good cause," but not all states define this phrase in the same manner.

== Franchise termination notice via franchise fraud ==
A franchisor that is practicing Franchise fraud will typically use a franchise termination process that was not disclosed in the Franchise agreement, Uniform Franchise Offering Circular, or Franchise Disclosure Document. A churning franchise practicing Franchise fraud can have a franchise termination process that includes:

- In the franchise agreement, specifying that contract disputes be settled by binding arbitration, away from the franchisees home state, which increases costs to the franchisee.
- Waiting until the franchisee reports they are in financial distress, which informs the franchisor that the franchisee does not have the funds to hire a lawyer.
- Demanding the failed franchisee pay up all unpaid royalties, fee, and penalties, prior to being issued the franchise termination documents from the franchisor. Unpaid royalties and fees continue to accrue until the franchise termination agreement is signed.

== Franchise termination by threat of frivolous litigation ==
Franchise termination documents can include two sets of documents; threat of Frivolous litigation, and a Legal release document.

The frivolous litigation threat can include claims of unpaid royalties, such as computer license fees, and unpaid future royalties and fees, which were not specified, or agreed to, in the original franchise agreement.

== Franchise termination legal release ==
The Legal release used by a churning franchise can contain clauses such as

- The franchisee agrees to the unpaid, and not previously discussed or agreed sums that were listed in the Frivolous litigation letter.
- The franchisee and all existing and future family members are bound by the Legal release in essentially a Gag order.
- The franchisee is released from future payments, but is not released from the terms of the original franchise agreement and additional terms in the Franchise legal release.
- The franchisee "voluntarily" transfers the failed franchise back to the franchisor, which allows the franchisor to avoid reporting the failed franchise statistics to the Federal Trade Commission in the UFOC or FDD, and allows the churning franchise to avoid informing future franchisee prospects of the true failures of the franchise concept.
- The franchisee cannot contact any former, current, or future franchisees to discuss the franchise termination process.
- A script as to what the former franchisee is only allowed to say to any prospective franchisee who contact them from a UFOC or FDD document.
- Substantial fines and penalties if the former franchisee violates the Legal release and discusses the contents with anyone by violating the Gag order.
- The franchisee states that they signed the franchise legal release voluntarily, even if they had no financial means to legally dispute the frivolous claims.

== Other forms of franchise failure ==
Franchise failures comprise franchise terminations, franchise non renewals and franchises that ceased operations for other reasons. All of these metrics are accessible in Item 20 of the Franchise Disclosure Document (FDD). The FDD is a uniform document regulated by the FTC. All franchisors selling franchises must update their FDDs at least once a year.

Franchise non-renewals, on the other hand, occur at the end of the franchise term and can occur for any number of reasons. The Franchisee might no longer see the value in the brand and prefer the run the location as an independent business.

The last metric of franchise failures is the number of franchises that ceased operations for other reasons. This is the broadest of the three categories, and a point of concern because it could be an indicator of franchise bankruptcy.

== See also ==
- American Association of Franchisees and Dealers
- Franchise Disclosure Document
- Franchise fraud
- Franchising
- Franchise agreement
- Censorship
- Chilling effect (law)
- Fear mongering
- The Franchise Rule
- Frivolous litigation
- Legal terrorism
- Legal threat
- SLAPP
- VetFran
