= Guidant Financial =

- Founded: 2003
- Founders: David Nilssen; Jeremy Ames
- Headquarters: Boise, Idaho
- Website: www.guidantfinancial.com

Guidant Financial is an American small business financing company headquartered in Boise, Idaho. It provides business financing to new and existing entrepreneurs. The company specializes in Rollovers as Business Startups (ROBS) and Small Business Administration (SBA) loans. Guidant Financial has helped over 25,000 entrepreneurs put greater than 4 billion to work in small business and franchise locations in all 50 states.

Guidant Financial is the largest ROBS provider and a third-party administrator of 401(k) plans. The company facilitates the process of rolling over individual eligible retirement funds to purchase stock in a new company for the purpose of small business financing. In 2011, it made headlines for supporting veterans with a dozen of entrepreneurial scholarships to start businesses. Guidant Financial also produces an annual business trends report called The State of Small Business. The past two years, it has been done in collaboration with The Lending Club.

== History ==
David Nilssen and Jeremy Ames co-founded Guidant Financial in 2003. According to Nilssen, their goal was to help individuals self-direct their IRA or 401(k) "to a variety of investment opportunities, including the purchase of a business or franchise." The company has been recognized by many organizations for its growth, impact, culture and leadership.

In 2019, Guidant Financial opened two new offices in Boise, Idaho, and Ho Chi Mihn City, Vietnam. Beginning in 2021, the company went entirely remote.
