= Gary Lefkowitz =

American businessman (born 1952)

- Born: Gary Wayne Lefkowitz; 1952 (age 73–74); United States
- Citizenship: American
- Education: Granada Hills High School
- Alma mater: University of Southern California; Loyola Law School
- Occupations: Businessman, lawyer
- Years active: c. 1970s–1995
- Employer: Citi Equity Group
- Known for: Founder of Citi Equity Group and involvement in a low-income housing fraud scheme
- Status: Convicted
- Convictions: 47 counts of fraud, obstruction of justice, and tax evasion
- Criminal charges: Fraud, obstruction of justice, tax evasion
- Penalty: 24 years imprisonment

Details
- Victims: Approximately 7,000 investors
- Date: 1984–1994
- Country: United States
- Date apprehended: 1994
- Imprisoned at: Federal Correctional Institution, Oakdale

Gary Wayne Lefkowitz (born 1952 or 1953) is an American businessman who was convicted in July 1995 of 47 counts of fraud, obstruction of justice, and tax evasion and was sentenced to 25 years in prison, the most for any white-collar criminal at the time.

In 1984, Lefkowitz founded Citi Equity Group, a fraudulent company lying to investors and housing authorities to get low-income housing tax credits, leaving property owners and builders with unpaid bills and embezzling investors' money.

== Biography ==
Gary Wayne Lefkowitz was born in 1952 or 1953. He grew up in the San Fernando Valley after his parents moved to California from the Midwest. His father, Albert, was convicted of income tax evasion and served a year in federal prison. Lefkowitz graduated from Granada Hills High School, earned a business administration degree from the University of Southern California, and later obtained a Juris Doctor degree from Loyola Law School. He ran a public interest law clinic in West Hollywood and gained some recognition representing elderly tenants, while also building political connections in the California Democratic Party.

Lefkowitz founded Citi Equity Group in 1984. Based in Culver City, it served as an investment company which helped finance and build low-rent apartment buildings, with operations in fourteen states. Additionally, Citi Equity claimed to use a section of the Tax Reform Act of 1986 to collect low-income tax credits, telling investors that they would receive a share. Although investors thought they were buying legitimate tax shelters designed to help finance low-income housing, according to prosecutors, many of the projects were left incomplete as Lefkowitz spent investors’ money to cover personal expenses and a Colorado ski resort. One of these projects, an apartment complex in Kennewick, burned to the ground in June 1996 after builders left the site as they were without pay.

Lefkowitz was charged in early May 1994 by a federal grand jury with 45 counts of conspiring to defraud home builders, the Internal Revenue Service and approximately 7,000 investors. On May 18, federal authorities indicted him. Lefkowitz pleaded not guilty and was freed on a USD$1 million bail, being represented by a public defender and telling the court that he was contemplating insanity as a defense. Citi Equity was also forced to file for Chapter 11 bankruptcy. On July 21, 1995, a federal jury in Minneapolis found Lefkowitz guilty of a total of 47 charges, which included fraud, obstruction of justice, and tax evasion. Despite a two-hour plea for leniency, presiding judge David S. Doty in Minneapolis sentenced him to 24 years in prison, a record punishment for white-collar crime. He served his 24-year sentence in a federal prison in Oakdale, Louisiana.
