= Franchise fee =

A franchise fee is a fee or charge that one party, the franchisee, pays another party, the franchisor, for the right to enter in a franchise agreement. Generally by paying the franchise fee a franchisee receives the rights to sell goods or services, under the franchisor's trademarks, as well as access to the franchisor's business processes. Often, the franchisee fee includes some assistance from the franchisor in opening the franchised business.

The fee typically consists of a lump sump payment plus ongoing royalties which are typically 5-10% of turnover.

== Scope ==
By joining a franchise, an investor or franchisee is able to run a business under the umbrella of the franchise.

The franchisee must pay a franchise fee, which may become costly. In the United States, it may amount to thousands of dollars. In return, the franchisee may enjoy the use of the franchisor's system and name for a limited time, as well as assistance. Such help includes location assistance for the outlet. The franchisor may provide initial training and an operating manual. Then the franchisor may also advise the franchisee on management, marketing, or personnel. For example, as of 1983 each ComputerLand store paid 8% of revenue to the company.

Through paying the franchise fee and joining an established franchise system, the franchisee may be entitled to significant cost savings from suppliers. However, there are major franchise systems like Quiznos who received rebates from suppliers and did not pass along the cost savings to the franchisee. It is required by law to disclose rebates and related payments that the franchisor might receive from suppliers in the franchise disclosure document.

== Payment Methods for the Franchise ==
Fees involved in acquiring and maintaining a franchise include:

=== Lump sum payment ===
When buying a franchise a lump sum payment may be required, encompassing payment for the right to use a product, brand, and business model.

=== Royalties ===
Royalties are periodic payments, often paid monthly, for the continuing permission to use the franchisee's brand and products. The royalty is usually 5-10% of the turnover.

== See also ==
- Franchising
- Franchise fraud
