= Franchise disclosure document =

United States disclosure document

A franchise disclosure document (FDD) is a legal document which is presented to prospective buyers of franchises in the pre-sale disclosure process in the United States. It was originally known as the Uniform Franchise Offering Circular (UFOC) (or uniform franchise disclosure document), prior to revisions made by the Federal Trade Commission in July 2007. Franchisors were given until July 1, 2008 to comply with the changes.

The Federal Trade Commission Rule of 1979 which governs the disclosure of essential information in the sale of franchises to the public underlies the state FDD's and prohibits any private right of action for the violation of the mandated disclosure provisions of the FDDs. Therefore, the FDD implies that only the federal government or the state governments have the right to sue and negotiate consent decrees and rescissions with those franchisors who violate the provisions of the FTC Franchise Rule. Various state franchise laws that provide for use of an FDD, in lieu of their own disclosure requirements, may create private rights of action, where a franchisor has violated its disclosure obligations in its FDD.

The Franchise Rule specifies FDD disclosure compliance obligations as to who must be the one to prepare the disclosures, who must furnish them to prospective franchisees, how franchisees receive the disclosures, and how long franchisees must have to review the disclosures and any revisions to the standard franchise agreement. The FDD underlies the franchise agreement (the formal sales contract) between the parties at the time the contract is formally signed. This franchise sales contract governs the long-term relationship – the terms of which generally range from five to twenty years. The contracts cannot generally be changed unless there is the agreement of both parties.

Under the Franchise Rule, which is enforced by the Federal Trade Commission (FTC), a prospective franchisee must receive the franchisor's FDD franchise disclosure document at least 14 days before they are asked to sign any contract or pay any money to the franchisor or an affiliate of the franchisor. The prospective franchisee has the right to ask for (and get) a copy of the sample franchise disclosure document once the franchisor has received the prospective franchisee's application and agreed to consider it. The franchisor may provide a copy of its franchise disclosure documents on paper, via email, through a web page, or on a disc. Franchise disclosure document requirements.

According to the Federal Trade Commission, there are 15 states that require franchisors to give an FDD to franchisees before any franchise agreement is signed. Thirteen of those states require that they are filed by a state agency for public record.

All franchise buyers should use the information contained in the FDD in their franchise research.

Franchise buyers considering financing their business should pay close attention to FDD Items 2, 7, 15 & 20. Lenders who participate in offering government-backed loans (SBA loans) to borrowers, carefully examine FDD (Items 2, 7, 15, 19 & 20) when considering a loan application. The FDD must also be approved by the SBA to be eligible for SBA financing. A list is made available for use by Lenders/CDCs in evaluating the eligibility of a small business that operates under an agreement.

== Requirements ==
The document discloses extensive information about the franchisor and the franchise organization which is intended to give the potential franchisee enough information to make educated decisions about their investments. The information is divided into a cover page, table of contents and 23 categories called "Items":

Twenty-one of the items contain information primarily pertaining to the franchisor, but only two of the items contain information pertaining to the performance of the franchise itself that is being offered for sale. Item 19, "Earnings Claims", is an optional disclosure under the FTC Rule and State FDDs. Item 20 provides a current accounting of the number of units that comprise the systems and reports the terminations and sale-transfers which have been applied to report the total number of units that comprise the system. Item 20 also provides the names and contact information of franchisees, current and ex-franchisees, who may be contacted for information in the due diligence process to be conducted by prospective buyers of the franchises offered for sale.

- 1. The Franchisor and Any Parents, Predecessors, and Affiliates.

This section tells how long the franchisor has been in business, likely competition, and any special laws that pertain to the industry, like any license or permit requirements. This will help the prospective franchisee understand the costs and risks they are likely to take on if they purchase and operate the franchise.

- 2. Identity and Business Experience of Key Persons.

This section identifies the executives of the franchise system and describes their experience.

- 3. Litigation History.

This section discusses prior litigation—whether the franchisor or any of its executive officers have been convicted of felonies involving fraud, violations of franchise law or unfair or deceptive practices, or are subject to any state or federal injunctions involving similar misconduct. It also says whether the franchisor or any of its executives have been held liable for—or settled civil actions involving—the franchise relationship. A number of claims against the franchisor may indicate that it has not performed according to its agreements, or, at the very least, that franchisees have been dissatisfied with its performance.
This section also should say whether the franchisor has sued any of its franchisees during the last year, a disclosure that may indicate common types of problems in the franchise system. For example, a franchisor may sue franchisees for failing to pay royalties, which could indicate that franchisees are unsuccessful, and therefore, unable or unwilling to make their royalty payments.

In 2016, Nestle USA sued Nestlé Toll House Café franchise for how it uses its trademark and related intellectual property to manage the Nestlé Toll House Café franchises. Franchisees could have risked losing the brand name that helps drive customers to buy their baked goods. All types of litigation are important for a perspective franchisee to review together with their franchise attorney before signing the franchise agreement.

- 4. Bankruptcy.

This section discloses whether the franchisor or any of its executives have been involved in a bankruptcy in the last 10 years, information that can help potential franchisees assess the franchisor’s financial stability and whether the company is capable of delivering the support services it promises.

- 5. Initial Franchise Fee.

This section describes the costs involved in starting and operating a franchise, including deposits or franchise fees that may be non-refundable, and costs for initial inventory, signs, equipment, leases, or rentals. It also explains ongoing costs, like royalties and advertising fees.

- 6. Other Fees and Expenses.

Training

This section explains the franchisor’s training and assistance program.

Advertising

This section has information on advertising costs. Franchisees often are required to contribute a percentage of their income to an advertising fund.

- 7. Franchisee's Estimated Initial Investment. The item is required to be listed as a table with all the expenses a franchisee is expected to incur prior to opening the franchised outlet and for the initial first months of operation. The franchisor must provide an estimate of each expense and explain the factors they relied on in calculating the amounts. These factors can be their own experience in opening corporate outlets, other franchisees’ experience, or estimates received from industry professionals. Franchisors often want to show the lowest amounts possible in Item 7, but this tendency works against them. If franchisees are consistently spending way more than the estimated range in Item 7, they may not have sufficient capital to open their business strong, and in extreme cases, may have a claim against the franchisor for misrepresentation.
- 8. Restrictions on Sources of Products and Services.

This section tells whether the franchisor limits:

- suppliers from whom a franchisee may purchase goods

- 9. Obligations of the Franchisee.
- 10. Financing Arrangements.
- 11. Obligations of the Franchisor.
- 12. Territory.
- 13. Trademarks.
- 14. Patents, Copyrights, and Proprietary Information.
- 15. The obligation of the Franchisee to Participate in the Actual Operation of the Franchise Business.
- 16. Restrictions on Goods and Services Offered by the Franchisee.
- 17. Renewal, Termination, Repurchase, Modification and/or Transfer of the Franchise Agreement, and Dispute Resolution.

This section spells out the conditions under which the franchisor may end a franchisee’s franchise and a franchisee’s obligations to the franchisor after termination. It also defines the conditions under which a franchisee can renew, sell, or assign the franchise to others.

- 18. Public Figures
- 19. Financial Performance Representations.

Earnings information can be misleading. And they can be one of the best sources to determine historic financial performance of others who have chosen to invest in a particular franchise brand. Only the financial information disclosed within this section of the FDD can be discussed during calls with representatives of the franchise brand.
Franchisors are not required to disclose information about potential income or sales, but if they do, the law requires that they have a reasonable basis for their claims and that they make the substantiation for their claims.
Franchisors practising Franchise fraud may have a high number of former franchisees under a Gag order, preventing a potential new franchisee from obtaining a clear picture of financial performance.

Sample Size

The disclosure document should tell the sample size and the number and percentage of franchisees who reported earnings at the level claimed.

Average Incomes

Average figures tell very little about how individual franchisees perform. An average figure may make the overall franchise system look more successful than it is because just a few very successful franchisees can inflate the average.

Gross Sales

These figures don’t really tell about the franchisees’ actual costs or profits. An outlet with a high gross sales revenue on paper may be losing money because of high overhead, rent, and other expenses.

Net Profits

Franchisors often do not have data on the net profits of their franchisees.

Geographic Relevance

Earnings may vary with geography. The disclosure document should note geographic or other differences among the group of franchisees whose earnings are reported and a franchisee’s likely location.

Franchisees’ Backgrounds

Franchisees have different skillsets and educational backgrounds. The success of some franchisees doesn’t guarantee success for all.

Reliance on Earnings Claims

Franchisors may ask a franchisee to sign a statement— sometimes presented as a written interview or questionnaire—that asks whether a franchisee received any earnings or financial performance representations during the course of buying a franchise.

- 20. List of Franchise Outlets

This section has very important information about current and former franchisees. Many franchisees in an area may mean more competition for customers. The number of terminated, cancelled, or non-renewed franchises may indicate problems. The sale-transfer columns can obscure churning of units through fire sales to third parties by failed or failing franchisees. Some companies may repurchase failed outlets and list them as company-owned outlets.
Some of the former franchisees may have signed confidentiality agreements that prevent them from speaking. Franchisors practising Franchise fraud may have a high number of former franchisees under a Gag order.
If a franchisee buys an existing outlet that was reacquired by the franchisor, the franchisor must tell the franchisee who owned and operated the outlet for the last five years. Several owners in a short time may indicate that the location isn’t profitable or that the franchisor hasn’t supported that outlet as promised.

- 21. Financial Statements

The disclosure document gives important information about the company’s financial status, including audited financial statements.
A franchisee can find explanatory information about the franchisor’s financial status in notes to the financial statements.
Investing in a financially unstable franchisor is a significant risk; the company may go out of business or into bankruptcy after a franchisee has invested its money.
A lawyer or an accountant can review the franchisor’s financial statements, audit report, and notes. They can help a franchisee understand whether the franchisor:

- has steady growth
- has a growth plan
- makes most of its income from the sale of franchises (Franchise fraud), or from continuing royalties.
- devotes sufficient funds to support its franchise system

- 22. Contracts
- 23. Acknowledgement of Receipt

== See also ==
- American Association of Franchisees and Dealers
- Franchise termination
- Federal Trade Commission
- Franchising
- Franchise fraud
- Franchise agreement
