= National Heritage Life Insurance Company =

Defunct American insurance company

- Abbreviation: NHLC
- Dissolved: 1995; 30 years ago
- Headquarters: Orlando, Florida, U.S.
- Products: Universal life insurance, life insurance, annuities
- Fields: Insurance
- Owner: Lifeco Investment Group
- Key people: Tri-Atlantic Holdings; Sholam Weiss; Lyle K. Pfeffer

National Heritage Life Insurance Company (NHLC) was an insurance company based in Orlando, Florida. It collapsed as a result of a fraud scheme, and was liquidated in 1995. It is believed to have been the largest insurance company failure caused by criminal acts in U.S. history, resulting in $450 million of losses.

== Background ==
National Heritage, then owned by Lifeco Investment Group, sold mostly universal life and other life insurance and annuity products, principally in Florida. In the late 1980s, the company was struggling financially, and in 1989 suffered a 34% decline in revenues, and reported a sizable operating loss. In 1990, the Delaware Insurance Department threatened to shut down the company if it did not raise additional capital. An investment group called Tri-Atlantic Holdings, operated by David Davies, Lambert Aloisi and Patrick Smythe, offered $4 million in return for a controlling interest in Lifeco and National Heritage. This was accepted.

== Fraud scheme ==
Lifeco did not know that Tri-Atlantic Holdings did not have $4 million. Instead, they issued a check and covered it with a series of transactions similar to a check-kiting scheme. These series of transactions reduced National Life's assets by $3 million. A lawyer named Michael Blutrich then became involved in the scheme. Blutrich was an owner of the strip club Scores in Manhattan, which was then controlled by the Gambino Mafia family. Blutrich was outside counsel for National Heritage, and later became a government witness who admitted to his role in the fraud.

Sholam Weiss became acquainted with Blutrich and his partner Lyle K. Pfeffer, and became involved in the fraud in 1992. After taking control in 1993, Weiss and others bought worthless stocks and mortgages in a series of deals that drained the insurer of hundreds of millions of dollars. Much of the money vanished., and millions went into accounts controlled by Weiss. The heavy involvement of attorneys, who comprised one-quarter of the persons eventually convicted, helped the conspirators keep the fraud secret.

National Life had about 35,000 customers, of whom about 10,500 lived in Florida. Many lost their life savings as a result of the fraud, though various guaranty funds repaid policy and annuity holders about $420 million. Nearly all the policies were acquired by the Metropolitan Life Insurance Co. Though the policyholders were largely able to recoup their funds, the delay caused hardship for some.

=== Aftermath ===
In 1994, the Delaware Insurance Department placed the company in receivership. It was liquidated in 1995.

Weiss was tried on multiple felony counts and fled the country while the jury was deliberating. In November 1999, he was found guilty in absentia and was sentenced to 845 years in prison. In addition to Weiss, 15 other defendants pleaded guilty or were convicted in the fraud case by the time he was sentenced, and several were serving long prison terms.

While on the run, Weiss travelled to Israel, Europe and South America, living extravagantly and spending money on fine dining, gambling and prostitution. He was apprehended in Vienna and extradited to the United States in 2002. At the time, Weiss was believed by the FBI to have control of $225 million to $250 million stolen from National Life.

The National Heritage financial collapse is believed to have been the largest insurance failure caused by crime in history, The sentence imposed on Weiss for his role in the scheme, 845 years, was the longest for a white-collar crime in the United States. Weiss's sentence was commuted by President Donald Trump on January 19, 2021.

== See also ==
- Sholam Weiss
