= Sholam Weiss =

American fraudster

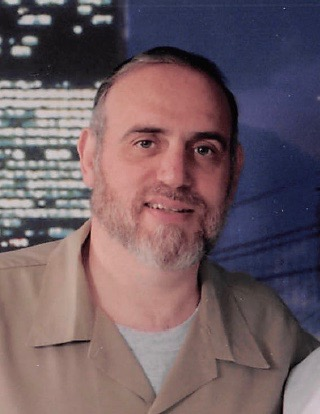
- Weiss in 2018
- Born: 1954 (age 71–72); Brooklyn, New York, U.S.
- Status: Released via presidential sentence commutation, January 20, 2021
- Occupation: Former business consultant
- Criminal charges: 78 counts of racketeering, wire fraud and money laundering
- Penalty: 835 years imprisonment (reduced from 845 years in 2009), three years supervised release, $123.4 million fine, $125 million restitution, $57 million forfeitures

Sholam Weiss (born 1954) is an American convicted fraudster.

In 2000, Weiss was sentenced to 845 years in prison for racketeering, wire fraud, money laundering, and other charges in connection to the collapse of the National Heritage Life Insurance Company. He and other defendants engaged in an immense scheme that siphoned off $450 million from the company, resulting in what was believed to be the largest insurance company failure ever caused by criminal acts.

His sentence was believed to be the longest prison term ever imposed in a U.S. federal court and the longest ever for white-collar crime. Weiss fled the country during jury deliberations in October 1999, and was extradited from Austria in 2002. His sentence was commuted by President Donald Trump on January 19, 2021. Weiss was released the next day.

== Early life and background ==
Weiss grew up in Borough Park, New York; he attended a Yiddish-language yeshiva and, as a child, Weiss delivered fruit for his father's fruit stand. As a young man, he did construction work, and purchased Windsor Plumbing Supply in 1974, at the age of 20. The firm was profitable for the 1970s and for most of the 1980s, but declared bankruptcy in the late 1980s.

In 1994, Weiss was indicted on mail fraud charges and found guilty, for which he served eight months in prison. Weiss had falsely claimed that more than $1 million worth of bathtubs had been damaged in a 1986 warehouse fire.

== National Heritage Life Insurance Company fraud ==
In a scheme that The New York Times described as "a series of numbingly complex mortgage and stock frauds", Weiss and others siphoned $450 million from the National Heritage Life Insurance Company. The majority of the insurer's policyholders were elderly Florida residents, and the case attracted little attention outside Florida, but federal authorities "said it ranked as the largest insurance company failure caused by criminal acts in United States history".

In 1990, the insurer was taken over by fraudsters who paid for the company with a check for $4 million, although they did not actually have $4 million. Then, using a variation on a simple check-kiting scheme, they lent themselves the money to cover the purchase price. Weiss became involved in the fraud in 1992 through an attorney, Michael Blutrich, who later admitted to the fraud and became a federal witness. After taking control, Weiss and others bought worthless stocks and mortgages in a series of deals that drained the insurer of hundreds of millions of dollars. Much of the money vanished, and millions went into accounts controlled by Weiss.

The heavy involvement of attorneys, who comprised one-quarter of the persons eventually convicted, helped the conspirators keep the fraud secret.

National Life, which was liquidated in 1995, had about 35,000 policy holders, of whom about 10,500 lived in Florida. Many lost their life savings as a result of the fraud, though various guaranty funds repaid policy and annuity holders about $420 million.

=== Trial, sentencing and flight ===
Weiss rejected a government offer of a plea deal in which he would have served five years in prison, and chose to go to trial. Weiss fled the country while the jury was deliberating. In November 1999, he was found guilty in absentia at the trial and was sentenced to 845 years in prison, three years of supervised release, a fine of $123.4 million and ordered to pay $125 million in restitution. Asset forfeitures of $57 million were also ordered. The restitution was paid. In addition to Weiss, 15 other defendants pleaded guilty or were convicted in the fraud case by the time he was sentenced, and several were serving long prison terms.

After fleeing the trial Weiss travelled to Israel, Belgium, Brazil, Austria and the United Kingdom. Weiss shaved his beard, lost weight, used prepaid phones and created false identities to avoid detection. During this time he lived an extravagant lifestyle and spent money on fine dining, gambling and prostitution. He was apprehended in Vienna, Austria and extradited to the United States in 2002. At the time of his extradition, Weiss was believed by the FBI to have control of $250 million stolen from National Life. Another estimate was that he controlled half of the $450 million he helped steal.

== Campaign to commute sentence ==
Weiss' sentence was controversial due to its length, which exceeded the 150-year sentence imposed on Bernard Madoff. The National Association of Criminal Defense Lawyers included Weiss with other clemency petitions it submitted to the White House. Rep. Sean Patrick Maloney asserted that the sentence was retaliation for rejecting a five-year plea deal. Weiss hired lobbyist Brett Tolman to press for commutation, and other supporters included former U.S. Attorney General Edwin Meese, former U.S. Solicitor General Seth Waxman and Harvard Law School professor Alan Dershowitz. The commutation campaign was spearheaded by his nephew.

The New York Times reported that Weiss was one of several "wealthy or well-connected people" who "benefited from their social, political, or financial ties to a loose collection of lawyers, lobbyists, activists and Orthodox Jewish leaders who had worked with Trump administration officials on criminal justice legislation championed by Jared Kushner". It reported that Weiss' case had been discussed at the White House for several years but met resistance. A Republican operative brought it to the attention of Mark Meadows, Trump's chief of staff, and Weiss' commutation followed.

On January 19, 2021, President Donald Trump commuted Weiss's sentence, in one of the 70 pardons and 73 sentence commutations issued on his last full day in office. A White House statement said that Weiss "has already served over 18 years and paid substantial restitution. He is 66 years old and suffers from chronic health conditions." Two months later, Weiss suffered a stroke.

In an editorial, The Washington Post criticized the commutation, noting that Weiss had "skipped town before his verdict, forcing federal officers to track him across continents", and opined that "of the inmates in federal prison, he is among the least deserving".

== See also ==
- List of people granted executive clemency by Donald Trump
