= Technological alliance =

There are various patterns of technological alliances from R&D enterprises to associations formed with the main purpose of sub-contracted manufacture or supply-chain management. The purpose here is to consider those forms of association devoted to the core of technology and to expand upon concepts touched upon in royalties.

While the three principal forms of association are (a)franchising (b) joint-ventures and (c) strategic partnerships, there are a variety of formal forms of association pertaining to the technological core. They are, in no intentional order:

- cross-licensing deals
- modern equivalents of keiretsu, zaibatsu and chaebol arrangements
- turnkey contracts
- engineering contracts
- technical assistance contracts
- technical service contracts
- management contracts
- contract of sale
- Venture Capital Agreements
- Build-Operate-Transfer contracts
- parent-subsidiary Agreements
- Business Process Outsourcing (BPO)
- conglomerates; inter alia agreements
- Private equityFirm Agreements and Partnerships
