= Franchising =

Business arrangement licensing a brand and model

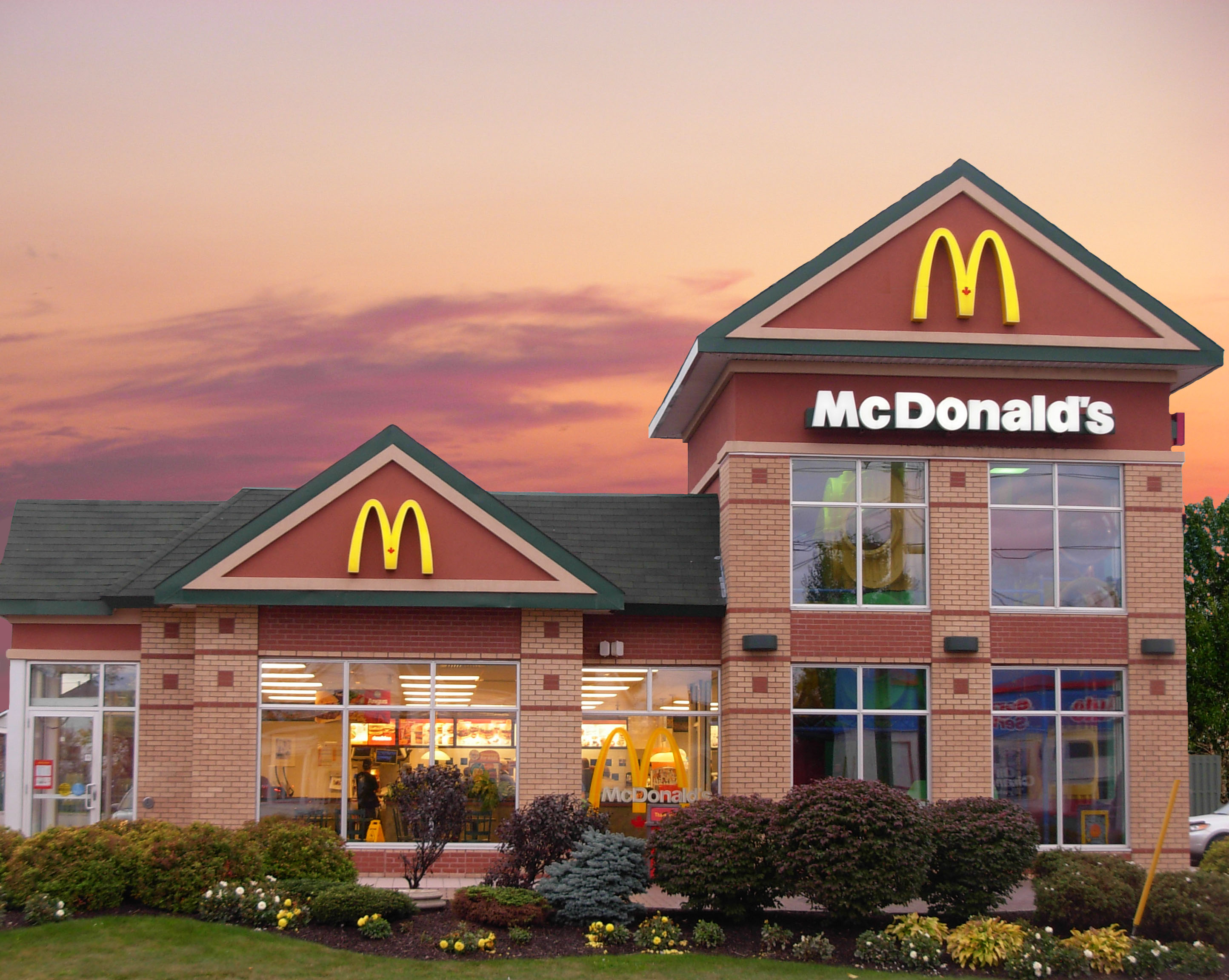
A McDonald's franchise in Moncton, New Brunswick, Canada

Franchising is a business practice where a company licenses its business model to another company. It can involve the franchisor licensing some or part of its knowhow, procedures, intellectual property and other rights to sell its branded products and services to a franchisee. In return, the franchisee pays certain fees and agrees to comply with certain obligations, typically set out in a franchise agreement. For the franchisor, use of a franchise system is an alternative business growth strategy, compared to expansion through corporate owned outlets or "chain stores". Adopting a franchise system is a business growth strategy that minimizes the franchisor's capital investment and liability risk.

Franchising is rarely an equal partnership, especially in the typical arrangement where the franchisee is an individual, unincorporated partnership or small privately-held corporation, as this ensures the franchisor has substantial legal and/or economic advantages over the franchisee. The usual exception to this rule is when the prospective franchisee is also a powerful corporate entity controlling a highly lucrative location, and/or captive market. For example, a large sports stadium for which prospective franchisors must compete to exclude one another. However, under specific circumstances like transparency, favourable legal conditions, financial means and proper market research, franchising can be a vehicle of success for both a large franchisor and a small franchisee.

Thirty-six countries have laws that explicitly regulate franchising, with the majority of all other countries having laws which have a direct or indirect effect on franchising.

== History ==
The rudiments of modern franchising date back to the Middle Ages when landowners made franchise-like agreements with tax collectors, who retained a percentage of the money they collected and turned the rest over. The practice ended around 1562, but spread into other endeavors. For example, in 17th-century England, franchisees were granted the right to sponsor markets and fairs or operate ferries. There was little growth in franchising, though, until the mid-19th century, when it appeared in the United States for the first time.

One of the first successful American franchising operations was started by an enterprising druggist named John Stith Pemberton. In 1886, he concocted a beverage comprising sugar, molasses, spices, and cocaine. Pemberton licensed selected people to bottle and sell the drink, which was an early version of what is now known as Coca-Cola. His was one of the earliest and most successful franchising operations in the United States.

The Singer Company implemented a franchising plan in the 1850s to distribute its sewing machines. The operation failed, though, because the company did not earn much money even though the machines sold well. The dealers, who had exclusive rights to their territories, absorbed most of the profits because of deep discounts. Some failed to push Singer products, so competitors were able to outsell the company. Under the existing contract, Singer could neither withdraw rights granted to franchisees nor send in its own salaried representatives. So, the company started repurchasing the rights it had sold. The experiment proved to be a failure. That may have been one of the first times a franchisor failed, but it was by no means the last. Colonel Harland Sanders did not initially succeed in his early efforts at franchising KFC. Still, the Singer venture did not put an end to franchising.

Other companies attempted franchising in one form or another after the Singer experience. For example, several decades later, General Motors established a somewhat successful franchising operation in order to raise capital. Perhaps the father of modern franchising, though, is Louis K. Liggett. In 1902, Liggett invited a group of druggists to join a "drug cooperative". As he explained to them, they could increase profits by paying less for their purchases, especially if they set up their own manufacturing company. His idea was to market private-label products. About 40 druggists pooled $4,000 of their own money and adopted the name Rexall. Sales soared, and Rexall became a franchisor. The chain's success set a pattern for other franchisors to follow.

Although many business owners did affiliate with cooperative ventures of one type or another, there was little growth in franchising until the early 20th century, and in whatever form franchising existed, it looked nothing like what it is today. As the United States shifted from an agricultural to an industrial economy, manufacturers licensed individuals to sell automobiles, trucks, gasoline, beverages, and a variety of other products. The franchisees did little more than selling the products, though. The sharing of responsibility associated with contemporary franchising arrangement did not exist to a great extent. Consequently, franchising was not a growth industry in the United States.

It was not until the 1960s and 1970s that people began to take a close look at the attractiveness of franchising. The concept intrigued people with entrepreneurial spirit. However, there were serious pitfalls for investors, which almost ended the practice before it became truly popular.

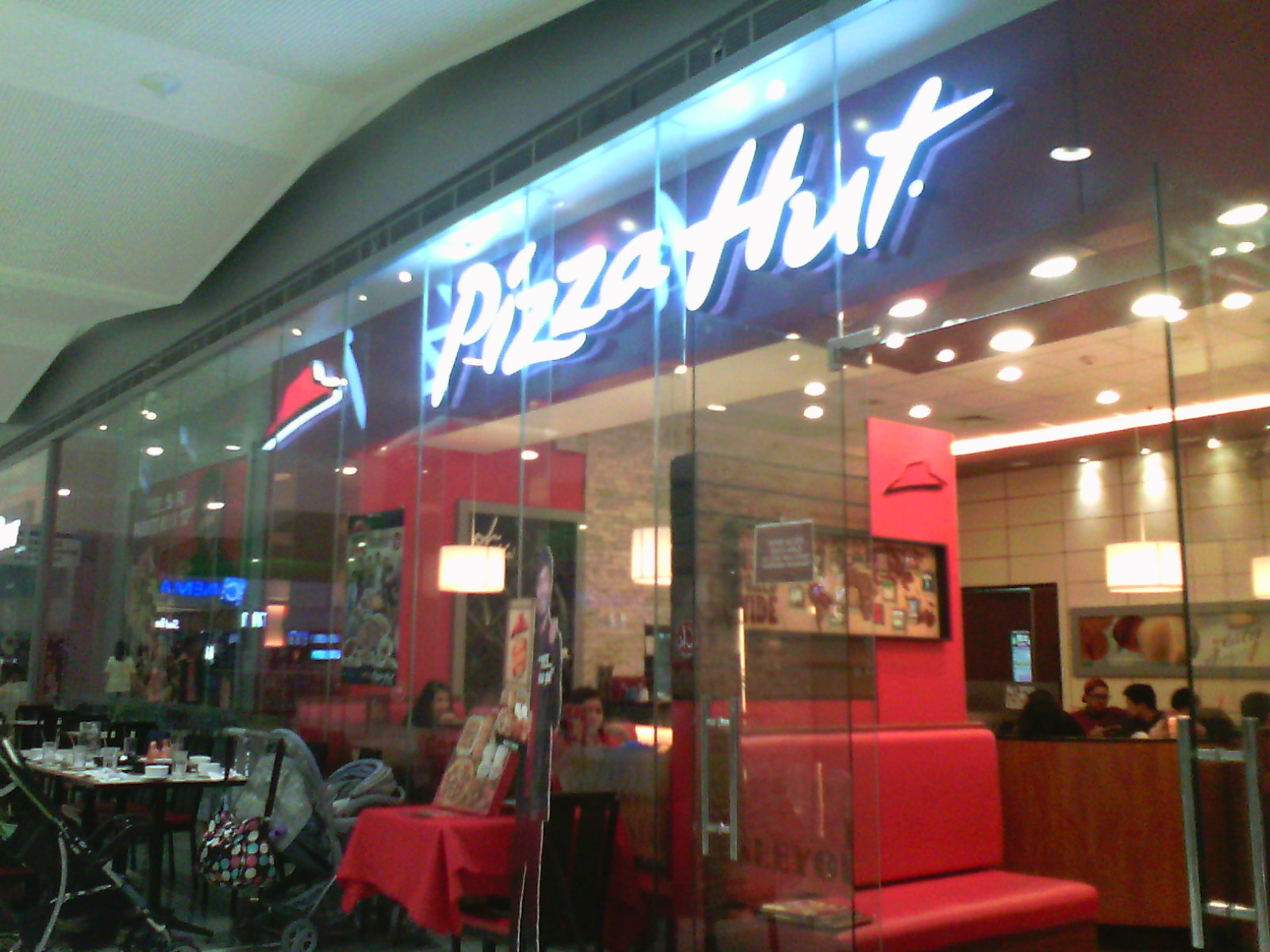
A Pizza Hut franchise at the SM City BF in Parañaque, Philippines in 2014

The United States is a leader in franchising, a position it has held since the 1930s, when it used the approach for fast-food restaurants, food inns and, slightly later, motels at the time of the Great Depression. As of 2005, there were 909,253 established franchised businesses, generating $880.9 billion of output and accounting for 8.1 percent of all private, non-farm jobs. This amounts to 11 million jobs, and 4.4 percent of all private-sector output.

Mid-sized franchises like restaurants, gasoline stations and trucking stations involve substantial investment and require all the attention of a businessperson.

There are also large franchises like hotels, spas and hospitals, which are discussed further under technological alliances.

"No poaching" agreements are prevalent within franchises, thus limiting the ability of employers at one franchise establishment to hire employees at an affiliated franchise. Economists have characterized these agreements as a contributor to oligopsony.

== Fees and contract arrangement ==
Three important payments are made to a franchisor: (a) a royalty for the trademark, (b) reimbursement for the training and advisory services given to the franchisee, and (c) a percentage of the individual business unit's sales. These three fees may be combined in a single 'management' fee. A fee for "disclosure" is separate and is always a "front-end fee".

A franchise usually lasts for a fixed time period (broken down into shorter periods, which each require renewal), and serves a specific territory or geographical area surrounding its location. One franchisee may manage several such locations. Agreements typically last from five to thirty years, with premature cancellations or terminations of most contracts bearing serious consequences for franchisees. A franchise is merely a temporary business investment involving renting or leasing an opportunity, not the purchase of a business for the purpose of ownership. It is classified as a wasting asset due to the finite term of the license.

Franchise fees are on average 6.7% with an additional average marketing fee of 2%. However, not all franchise opportunities are the same, and many franchise organizations are exploring new models of structure and success for the organization as well as the franchisee.

A franchise can be exclusive, non-exclusive or "sole and exclusive".

Although franchisor revenues and profit may be listed in a franchise disclosure document (FDD), no laws require an estimate of franchisee profitability, which depends on how intensively the franchisee "works" the franchise. Therefore, franchisor fees are typically based on "gross revenue from sales" and not on profits realized. See remuneration.

Various tangibles and intangibles such as national or international advertising, training and other support services are commonly made available by the franchisor.

Franchise brokers help franchisors find appropriate franchisees. There are also main 'master franchisors' who obtain the rights to sub-franchise in a territory.

According to the International Franchise Association approximately 44% of all businesses in the United States are franchisee-worked.

=== Example ===
As of 1983 each ComputerLand store paid 8% of revenue to the company as a franchise fee, which in turn sold products at cost to the stores. ComputerLand provided sales training and marketing assistance but did not train franchisees on individual products, relying on their vendors to do so. The company provided 85-90% of stores' products, choosing them mostly on franchisees' requests, and usually did not accept returns. Stores could purchase merchandise from other distributors, and traded with or sold inventory to each other as needed.

== Rationale and risk shift ==
Franchising is one of the few means available to access venture capital without the need to give up control of the operation of the chain and build a distribution system for servicing it. After the brand and formula are carefully designed and properly executed, franchisors are able to sell franchises and expand rapidly across countries and continents using the capital and resources of their franchisees while reducing their own risk.

There is also risk for the people buying the franchises. However, failure rates are much lower for franchise businesses than independent business startups.

Franchisor rules imposed by the franchising authority are becoming increasingly strict. Some franchisors are using minor rule violations to terminate contracts and seize the franchise without any reimbursement.

== Advantages and disadvantages of franchising as an entry mode ==
Franchising brings with it several advantages and disadvantages for firms looking to expand into new areas and foreign markets. The primary advantage is that the firm does not have to bear the development cost and risks of opening a foreign market on its own, as the franchisee is typically responsible for those costs and risks, putting the onus on them to build a profitable operation as quickly as possible. Through franchising, a firm has the potential of building a global presence quickly and also at a low cost and risk.

For the franchisee, the primary advantages are access to a well-known brand, support in setting up the business using operating manuals, and ongoing operational support including access to suppliers and employee training.

A primary disadvantage to franchising from the franchisor’s viewpoint is quality control, as the franchisor wants the firm's brand name to convey a message to consumers about the quality and consistency of the firm's product. They want the consumer to experience the same quality regardless of location or franchise status. This can prove to be an issue with franchising, as a customer who had a bad experience at one franchise may assume that they will have the same experience at other locations with other services. Distance can make it difficult for firms to detect whether or not the franchises are of poor quality. One way around this disadvantage is to set up extra subsidiaries in each country or state in which the firm expands. This creates a smaller number of franchisees to oversee, which will reduce the quality control challenges.

== Obligations of the parties ==
Each party to a franchise has several interests to protect. The franchisor is involved in securing protection for the trademark, controlling the business concept and securing know-how. The franchisee is obligated to carry out the services for which the trademark has been made prominent or famous. There is a great deal of standardization required. The place of service has to bear the franchisor's signs, logos and trademark in a prominent place. The uniforms worn by the staff of the franchisee have to be of a particular design and color. The service has to be in accordance with the pattern followed by the franchisor in the successful franchise operations. Thus, franchisees are not in full control of the business, as they would be in retailing.

A service can be successful if equipment and supplies are purchased at a fair price from the franchisor or sources recommended by the franchisor. A coffee brew, for example, can be readily identified by the trademark if its raw materials come from a particular supplier. If the franchisor requires purchase from her stores, it may come under anti-trust legislation or equivalent laws of other countries. So, too, with purchases such as the uniforms of personnel and signs, as well as the franchise sites, if they are owned or controlled by the franchisor.

The franchisee must carefully negotiate the license and must develop a marketing or business plan with the franchisor. The fees must be fully disclosed and there should not be any hidden fees. The start-up costs and working capital must be known before the license is granted. There must be assurance that additional licensees will not crowd the "territory" if the franchise is worked according to plan. The franchisee must be seen as an independent merchant. It must be protected by the franchisor from any trademark infringement by third parties. A franchise attorney is required to assist the franchisee during negotiations.

Often the training period – the costs of which are in great part covered by the initial fee – is too short in cases where it is necessary to operate complicated equipment, and the franchisee has to learn on their own from instruction manuals. The training period must be adequate, but in low-cost franchises it may be considered expensive. Many franchisors have set up corporate universities to train staff online. This is in addition to providing literature, sales documents and email access.

Also, franchise agreements carry no guarantees or warranties and the franchisee has little or no recourse to legal intervention in the event of a dispute. Franchise contracts tend to be unilateral and favor of the franchisor, who is generally protected from lawsuits from their franchisees because of the non-negotiable contracts that franchisees are required to acknowledge, in effect, that they are buying the franchise knowing that there is risk, and that they have not been promised success or profits by the franchisor. Contracts are renewable at the sole option of the franchisor. Most franchisors require franchisees to sign agreements that mandate where and under what law any dispute would be litigated.

== Regulations ==
=== Australia ===
In 2016 there were an estimated 1,120 franchise brands operating in Australia and an estimated 79,000 units operating in business format franchises, with a total brand turnover of approximately $146 billion and a sales revenue of approximately $66.5 billion. In 2016 the majority of franchise brands were retailers with the largest segment being non-food retailing, accounting for 26 percent of brands, a further 19 percent of brands were involved in food retailing, 15 percent of franchisors operated in administration and support services, 10 percent in other services, 7 percent in education and training and 7 percent in rental, hire and real estate services.

Franchising in Australia commenced in a significant way in the early 1970s under the influence of the franchised US fast food systems such as KFC, Pizza Hut, and McDonald's. It was however underway prior to this and a decade earlier in 1960 Leslie Joseph Hooker, considered a pioneer of franchising, created Australia's first national real estate agency network of Hooker real estate agencies.

In Australia, franchising is regulated by the Franchising Code of Conduct, a mandatory code of conduct concluded under the Trade Practices Act 1974. The ACCC regulates the Franchising Code of Conduct, which is a mandatory industry code that applies to the parties to a franchise agreement. This code requires franchisors to produce a disclosure document which must be given to a prospective franchisee at least 14 days before the franchise agreement is entered into.

The code also regulates the content of franchise agreements, for example in relation to marketing funds, a cooling-off period, termination, and the resolution of disputes by mediation.

On 1 January 2015, the old Franchising Code was repealed and replaced with a new Franchising Code of Conduct. The new Code applies to conduct on or after 1 January 2015.

The new Code:

- introduces an obligation under the Code for parties to act in good faith in their dealings with one another
- introduces financial penalties and infringement notices for serious breaches of the Code
- requires franchisors to provide prospective franchisees with a short information sheet outlining the risks and rewards of franchising
- requires franchisors to provide greater transparency in the use of and accounting for money used for marketing and advertising and to set up a separate marketing fund for marketing and advertising fees
- requires additional disclosure about the ability of the franchisor and a franchisee to sell online
- prohibits franchisors from imposing significant capital expenditure except in limited circumstances.

These are significant changes and it is important that franchisors, franchisees and potential franchises understand their rights and responsibilities under the Code.

For further information about the changes to the Code, please see the updated Franchisor Compliance Manual and the Franchisee Manual.

The Code explanatory materials are available from the ComLaw website (link is external).

=== New Zealand ===
New Zealand is served by around 423 franchise systems operating 450 brands, giving it the highest proportion of franchises per capita in the world. Despite (or because of) the 2008–2009 recession, the total number of franchised units increased by 5.3% from 2009 to 2010. There is no separate law covering franchises, so they are covered by normal commercial law. This functions very well in New Zealand and includes law as it applies to contracts, restrictive trade practices, intellectual property, and the law of misleading or deceptive conduct.

The Franchise Association of New Zealand introduced a self-regulatory code of practice for its members in 1996. This contains many provisions similar to those of the Australian Franchising Code of Practice legislation, although only around a third of all franchises are members of the association and therefore bound by the code.

A case of fraud in 2007 perpetrated by a former master franchisee of the country's largest franchise system led to a review of the need for franchise law by the Ministry of Economic Development. The New Zealand Government decided there was no case for franchise-specific legislation at that time. This decision was criticised by the opposition, which had initiated the review when in power, and the review process was questioned by a leading academic. The Franchise Association originally supported the positive regulation of the franchise sector but its eventual submission to the review was in favour of the status quo of self-regulation.

=== Brazil ===
By the end of 2012, about 2,031 franchise brands were operating in Brazil, with approximately 93,000 locations, making it one of the largest countries in the world in terms of number of units. Around 11 percent of this total were foreign-based franchisors.

The Brazilian Franchise Law (Law No. 8955 of 15 December 1994) defines the franchise as a system in which the franchisor licenses the franchisee, for a payment, the right to use a trademark or patent along with the right to distribute products or services on an exclusive or semi-exclusive basis. The provision of a "Franchise Offer Circular", or disclosure document, is mandatory before execution of agreement and is valid for all of the Brazilian territory. Failure to disclose voids the agreement, which leads to refunds and serious payments for damages. The Franchise Law does not distinguish between Brazilian and foreign franchisors. The National Institute of Industrial Property (INPI) is the registering authority. Indispensable documents are a Statement of Delivery (of disclosure documentation) and a Certification of Recording (INPI). The latter is necessary for payments. All sums may not be convertible into foreign currency. Certification may also mean compliance with Brazil's antitrust legislation.

Parties to international franchising may decide to adopt the English language for the document, as long as the Brazilian party knows English fluently and expressly acknowledges that fact, to avoid translation. The registration accomplishes three things:

* It make the agreement effective against third parties
* It permits the remittance of payments
* It qualifies the franchisee for tax deductions.

=== Canada ===
In Canada, recent legislation has mandated better disclosure and fair treatment of franchisees. The regulations also ensure their right to form associations and launch collective action, even if they signed contracts prohibiting such moves. Franchising in Canada involves 1,300 brands, 80,000 franchise units accounting for about 20% of all consumer spending.

=== China ===
China has the most franchises in the world but the scale of their operations is relatively small. The average franchise system in China has about 45 outlets, compared to more than 540 in the United States. Together, there are 2600 brands in some 200,000 retail markets. KFC was the most significant foreign entry in 1987 and is widespread. Many franchises are in fact joint-ventures, as at their forming the franchise law was not explicit. For example, McDonald's is a joint venture. Pizza Hut, TGIF, Wal-mart, Starbucks followed not long thereafter. But total franchising is only 3% of retail trade, which seeks foreign franchise growth.

The year 2005 saw the birth of an updated franchise law, "Measures for the Administration of Commercial Franchise". Previous legislation (1997) made no specific inclusion of foreign investors. Further updates were made in 2007, with the objective of increased clarity of the law.

The laws are applicable if there are transactions involving a trademark combined with payments with many obligations on the franchisor. The law comprises 42 articles and eight chapters.

Among the franchisor obligations are:

- The FIE (foreign-invested enterprise) franchisor must be registered by the regulator
- The franchisor (or its subsidiary) must have operated at least two company-owned franchises in China (revised to "anywhere") for more than 12 months ("the two-shop, one-year" rule)
- The franchisor must disclose any information requested by the franchisee
- Cross-border franchising, with some caveats, is possible (2007 law).

The franchisor must meet a list of requirements for registration, among which are:

- The standard franchise agreement, working manual and working capital requirements,
- A track-record of operations, and ample ability to supply materials,
- The ability to train the Chinese personnel and provide long-term operational guidance,
- The franchise agreement must have a minimum three-year term.

Among other provisions:

- The franchisor is liable for certain actions of its suppliers
- Monetary and other penalties apply for infractions of the regulations.

The disclosure must take place 20 days in advance. It has to contain:

- Details of the franchisor's experience in the franchised business with scope of business
- Identification of the franchisor's principal officers
- Litigation of the franchisor during the past five years
- Full details about all franchise fees
- The amount of a franchisee's initial investment
- A list of the goods or services the franchisor can supply, and the terms of supply
- The training franchisees will receive
- Information about the trademarks, including registration, usage and litigation
- Demonstration of the franchisor's capabilities to provide training and guidance
- Statistics about existing units, including number, locations and operational results, and the percentage of franchises that have been terminated, and
- An audited financial report and tax information (for an unspecified period of time).

Other elements of this legislation are:

- The franchisee's confidentiality obligations continue indefinitely after termination or expiration of the franchise agreement
- If the franchisee has paid a deposit to the franchisor, it must be refunded on termination of the franchise agreement; upon termination, the franchisee is prohibited from continuing to use the franchisor's marks.

=== India ===
The franchising of foreign goods and services to India is in its infancy. The first International Exhibition was only held in 2009. India is, however, one of the biggest franchising markets because of its large middle-class of 300 million who are not reticent about spending and because the population is entrepreneurial in character. In a highly diversified society, (see Demographics of India) McDonald's has succeeded despite its menu differing from that of the rest of the world.

So far, franchise agreements are covered under two standard commercial laws: the Contract Act 1872 and the Specific Relief Act 1963, which provide for both specific enforcement of covenants in a contract and remedies in the form of damages for breach of contract.

=== Kazakhstan ===
In Kazakhstan franchise turnover for 2013 is US$2.5 billion per year. Kazakhstan is the leader in Central Asia in the franchising market. A special law on franchising came into effect in 2002. There are more than 300 franchise systems and the number of franchised outlets approaches 2000. Kazakhstan franchising began with the emergence of a Coca-Cola factory, opened to sublicense a Turkish licensor of the same brand. The plant was built in 1994. Other brands that are also present in Kazakhstan through the franchise system include Pepsi, Hilton, Marriott, Intercontinental, and Pizza Hut.

=== Europe ===
Franchising has grown rapidly in Europe in recent years, but the industry is largely unregulated. The European Union has not adopted a uniform franchise law. Only six of the 27 member states have a pre-contract disclosure law. They are France (1989), Spain (1996), Romania (1997), Italy (2004), Sweden (2004) and Belgium (2005). Estonia and Lithuania have franchise laws that impose mandatory terms on franchise agreements. In Spain there is also mandatory registration on a public registry. Although they have no franchise specific laws, Germany and those countries with a legal system based upon that of Germany, such as Austria, Greece and Portugal, probably impose the greatest regulatory burden on franchisors due to their tendency to treat franchisees as quasi consumers in certain circumstances and the willingness of the judiciary to use the concept of good faith to make pro-franchisee decisions. In the UK, the recent Papa John case shows that there is also a need for pre-contractual disclosure and the Yam Seng case shows that there is a duty of good faith in franchise relationships.

The European Franchising Federation's Code of Ethics has been adopted by seventeen national franchise associations. However this has no legal force and enforcement by the national associations is neither uniform of rigorous. Commentators like Dr Mark Abell, in his book The Law and Regulation of Franchising in the EU (published in 2013 by Edward Elgar, ISBN 978 1 78195 2207) consider this lack of uniformity to be one of the greatest barriers to franchising realising its potential in the EU.

When adopting a European strategy, it is important that a franchisor takes expert legal advice. Most often one of the principal tasks in Europe is to find retail space, which is not so significant a factor in the US. This is where the franchise broker, or the master franchisor, plays an important role. Cultural factors are also relevant, as local populations tend to be heterogeneous.

==== France ====
France is one of Europe's largest markets. Similar to the United States, it has a long history of franchising, dating back to the 1930s. Growth came in the 1970s. The market is considered difficult for outside franchisors because of cultural characteristics, yet McDonald's and Century 21 are found everywhere. There are some 30 U.S. firms involved in franchising in France.

There are no government agencies regulating franchises. The Loi Doubin Law of 1989 was the first European franchise disclosure law. Combined with Decree No. 91-337, it regulates disclosure, although the decree also applies to any person who provides to another person a corporate name, trademark or trade name or other business arrangements. The law applies to "exclusive or quasi-exclusive territory". The disclosure document must be delivered at least 20 days before the execution of the agreement or any payments are made.

The specific and important disclosures to be made are:

1. The date of the founding of the franchisor's enterprise and a summary of its business history and all information necessary to assess the business experience of the franchisor, including bankers,
2. A description of the local market for the goods or services,
3. The franchisor's financial statements for the previous two years,
4. A list of all other franchisees currently in the network,
5. All franchisees who have left the network during the preceding year, whether by termination or non-renewal, and
6. The conditions for renewal, assignment, termination and the scope of exclusivity.

Initially, there was some uncertainty whether any breach of the provisions of the Doubin Law would enable the franchisee to walk away from the contract. However, the French supreme court (Cour de cassation) eventually ruled that agreements should only be annulled where missing or incorrect information affected the decision of the franchisee to enter into the agreement. The burden of proof is on the franchisee.

Dispute settlement features are only incorporated in some European countries. By not being rigorous, franchising is encouraged.

==== Italy ====
Under Italian law franchise is defined as an arrangement between two financially independent parties where a franchisee is granted, in exchange for a consideration, the right to market goods and services under particular trademarks. In addition, articles dictate the form and content of the franchise agreement and define the documents that must be made available 30 days prior to execution. The franchisor must disclose:

a) A summary of the franchise activities and operations,
b) A list of franchisees currently operating in the franchise system in Italy,
c) Year-by-year details of the changes in the number of franchisees for the previous three years in Italy,
d) A summary of any court or arbitral proceedings in Italy related to the franchise system, and
e) If requested by the franchisee, copies of franchisor's balance sheets for the previous three years, or since start-up if that period is shorter.

==== Norway ====
There are no specific laws regulating franchising in Norway. However, the Norwegian Competition Act section 10 prohibits cooperation which may prevent, limit or diminish the competition. This may also apply to vertical cooperation such as franchising.

==== Russia ====
In Russia, under chapter 54 of the Civil Code (passed 1996), franchise agreements are invalid unless written and registered, and franchisors cannot set standards or limits on the prices of the franchisee's goods. Enforcement of laws and resolution of contractual disputes is a problem: Dunkin' Donuts chose to terminate its contract with Russian franchisees who were selling vodka and meat patties contrary to their contracts, rather than pursue legal remedies.

==== Spain ====
The legal definition of franchising in Spain is an activity in which an undertaking, the franchisor, grants to another party, the franchisee, for a specific market and in exchange for financial compensation (either direct, indirect or both), the right to exploit an owned system to commercialize products or services already exploited by the franchisor with enough success and experience.

The Spanish Retail Trading Act regulates franchising. The contents of the franchise must include, at least:

- The use of a common name or brand or any other intellectual property right and a uniform presentation of the premises or the transport means included in the agreement.
- The communication by the franchisor to the franchise of certain technical knowledge or substantial and singular know-how that has to be owned by the franchisor, and
- Technical or commercial assistance or both, provided by the franchisor to the franchisee during the agreement, without prejudice to any supervision faculty to which the parties could freely agree in the contract.

In Spain, the franchisor submits the disclosure information 20 days prior to signing the agreement or prior to any payment made by the franchisee to the franchisor. Franchisors are to disclose to the potential franchisee specific information in writing. This information has to be true and not misleading and include:

- Identification of the franchisor;
- Justification of ownership or license for use of any trademark or similar sign and judicial claims affecting them as well as the duration of the license;
- General description of the sector in which the franchise operates;
- Experience of the franchisor;
- Contents and characteristics of the franchise and its exploitation;
- Structure and extension of the network in Spain;
- Essential elements of the franchise agreement.

Franchisors (with some exceptions) should be registered in the Franchisors' Register and provide the requested information. According to the regulation in force in 2010 this obligation has to be met within three months after the start of its activities in Spain.

==== Turkey ====
Franchising is a sui generis contract which bears the characteristics of several explicitly regulated contracts such as; agency, sales contract and so forth. The regulations concerning these kinds of contracts in Turkish Commercial Code and in Turkish Code of Obligations are applied to franchising. Franchising is described in doctrine and has several essential components such as; the independence of the franchisee from the franchisor, the use of know-how and the uniformity of product and services, standard use of the brand and logo, payment of a royalty fee, increase of sales by the franchisee and continuity. Franchising may be for a determined or undetermined period of time. The undetermined one can only be annulled either by a notice before a reasonable amount of time that is or by a just cause. The franchising agreement with a determined time period ends within the end of the time period if not specified otherwise in the agreement. However, termination based on just cause is also foreseen for franchising agreement with a determined time period.

==== United Kingdom ====
In the United Kingdom there are no franchise-specific laws, and franchises are subject to the same laws that govern other businesses. Even without direct legislation, judicial decisions indicate that a franchisor is expected to provide a clear disclosure of relevant facts before the franchisee enters into a franchise, and that franchisors have a duty of good faith. The Trading Schemes Act, which governs arrangements in which participants may receive a benefit or reward for introducing other participants to a scheme or sell goods or services provided by the person who is promoting the scheme, may apply to multi-tiered franchises. The industry engages in some self-regulation through the British Franchise Association (BFA) and the Quality Franchise Association (QFA).

There are a number of franchise businesses which are not members of the BFA and many which do not meet the BFA membership criteria. Part of the BFA's role in self-regulation is to work with franchisors through the application process and recommend changes which will lead to the franchise business meeting BFA standards. A number of businesses that refer to themselves as franchises do not conform to the BFA Code of Ethics are therefore excluded from membership.

On 22 May 2007, hearings were held in the UK Parliament concerning citizen-initiated petitions for special regulation of franchising by the government of the UK due to losses incurred by citizens who had invested in franchises. The Minister for Industry and the Regions, Margaret Hodge, conducted hearings but saw no need for any government regulation of franchising with the advice that government regulation of franchising might lull the public into a false sense of security. Mr Mark Prisk MP suggested that the costs of such regulation to the franchisee and franchisor could be prohibitive and would in any case provide a system which mirrored the work already being completed by the BFA. The Minister for Industry and the Regions indicated that if due diligence were performed by the investors and the banks, the current laws governing business contracts in the UK offered sufficient protection for the public and the banks. The debate also made reference to the self-regulatory function performed by the BFA recognizing that the association "punched above its weight".

In the 2010 case of MGB Printing v Kall Kwik UK Ltd., the High Court established that a franchisor may assume a duty of care to a franchisee in certain circumstances. Kall Kwik, a design and print franchisor, had incorrectly advised MGB, who was purchasing a franchise, of the costs of undertaking refit work needed to meet Kall Kwik's franchising requirements. In this particular case, Kall Kwik had stated that they would provide professional advice to potential franchisees, and because they had not provided details of the fitting standards which must be met, they had encouraged MGB to rely on the advice offered by themselves.

On 3 June 2021, it was announced that the Approved Franchise Association (AFA) would merge with the British Franchise Association (BFA) and that both franchise associations would operate under the BFA umbrella.

=== United States ===
Isaac Singer, who made improvements to an existing model of a sewing machine in the 1850s, began one of the first franchising efforts in the United States, followed later by Coca-Cola, Western Union, and by agreements between automobile manufacturers and dealers.

Modern franchising came to prominence with the rise of franchise-based food service establishments. In 1932, Howard Deering Johnson established the first modern restaurant franchise based on his successful Quincy, Massachusetts Howard Johnson's restaurant founded in the late 1920s. The idea was to let independent operators use the same name, food, supplies, logo and even building design in exchange for a fee. The growth in franchising accelerated in the 1930s when such chains as Howard Johnson's started to franchise motels. The 1950s saw a boom in franchise chains in conjunction with the development of the U.S. Interstate Highway System and the growing popularity of fast food.

The Federal Trade Commission has oversight of franchising via the FTC Franchise Rule.

The FTC requires that the franchisee be furnished with a Franchise Disclosure Document (FDD) by the franchisor at least fourteen days before money changes hands or a franchise agreement is signed. Whereas elements of the disclosure may be available from third parties, only that provided by the franchisor can be depended upon. The U.S. Franchise Disclosure Document (FDD) is lengthy (300–700 pp +) and detailed (see Franchise Disclosure Document, above), and generally requires audited financial statements from the franchisor in a particular format, except in some circumstances, such as where a franchisor is new. It must include such data as the names, addresses and telephone numbers of the franchisees in the licensed territory (who may be contacted and consulted before negotiations), estimate of total franchise revenues and franchisor profitability.

Individual states may require the FDD to contain their own specific requirements, but the requirements in state disclosure documents must be in compliance with the federal rule that governs federal regulatory policy. There is no private right of action of action under the FTC rule for franchisor violation of the rule, but fifteen or more of the states have passed statutes that provide this right of action to franchisees when fraud can be proven under these special statutes. The majority of franchisors have inserted mandatory arbitration clauses into their agreements with their franchisees, some of which the U.S. Supreme Court has dealt with.

In response to the implementation of California Assembly Bill 5 (2019) which limits the use of classifying workers as independent contractors rather than employees in California, the United States Court of Appeals for the Ninth Circuit reinstated its decision in Vazquez v. Jan-Pro which impacts California franchise law and California independent contractor law by making it unclear that if a franchisor licenses its trademark to a franchisee, whether the franchisor incurs the liabilities of an employer for a franchisee's employees.

There is no federal registry of franchises or any federal filing requirements for information. States are the primary collectors of data on franchising companies and enforce laws and regulations regarding their presence and their spread in their jurisdictions.

Where the franchisor has many partners, the agreement may take the shape of a business format franchise – an agreement that is identical for all franchisees.

== Community Franchising ==
=== Definition ===
A Community Franchise is a business model wherein any group with community responsibilities at any level of government—from local to federal—may act as a community owned commercial Franchisor to provide services. A community group identifies a societal need and establishes its value to government. Franchisee operators are invited by the government agency to propose solutions that address this need. Once selected, the franchisees deliver services under the branding of the community organization and receive compensation for fulfilling the specified objectives.

=== Example ===
The most prominent example of this business model is the ski lifting business of Dolomiti SuperSki (DSS) in Italy. Established in 1974, DSS is a private commercial entity composed of more than 160 local companies across 12 adjoining ski areas, headquartered in Kastelruth, Italy. Franchisee operators vary significantly in size, from single-lift businesses to large enterprises overseeing multiple lift systems throughout the ski area.

=== Operations ===
This operational model features DSS as the Franchisor, which does not directly provide any transport services itself. DSS’s role is:

· to license multiple independent Franchisee lift operators as franchisees, each managing their own transportation devices on exclusive defined lines or routes,

· to market the service to the public,

· to collect all revenue, and

· to distribute agreed amounts to each franchisee in proportion to the number of passengers who take the franchisee’s lift.

Franchisees determine their capital investments after identifying and securing their preferred route, estimating potential patronage and revenue, balancing upfront infrastructure and ongoing operational costs against projected cash flow. Tickets to ride the ski lifts by the traveling public are bought only from DSS and the money raised is distributed to franchisees, in direct proportion to the number of passengers who travels on their lines. Franchisees’ financial viability depends on having relevant origin/destination characteristics to attract sufficient passenger volumes to use their lines, and by utilising infrastructure that is sufficiently economical to staff and operate.

Upon acceptance of their proposed route by DSS, franchisees receive conditional title over their designated transport line. This becomes an asset that can be developed, borrowed against, or sold, subject to the franchisee’s compliance with the franchise agreement. This appears to be the only community franchise enterprise operating in the public transport field that has been identified and studied.

The application of this business model to public transport was examined in 2013 by researchers at the Institute of Transport and Logistic Studies within the Business School of Sydney University, Australia (Emerson, 2016). This research focused on the organizational structure of ski lift operations in Italy, operated by Dolomiti SuperSki (DSS), where a central community requirement is an effective public ski lift system integral to the region's hiking and ski-based economy.

== Social franchises ==
In recent years, the idea of franchising has been picked up by the social enterprise sector, which hopes to simplify and expedite the process of setting up new businesses. A number of business ideas, such as soap making, wholefood retailing, aquarium maintenance, and hotel operation have been identified as suitable for adoption by social firms employing disabled and disadvantaged people.

The most successful examples are probably the Kringwinkel second-hand shops employing 5,000 people in Flanders, franchised by KOMOSIE, the CAP Markets, a steadily growing chain of 100 neighbourhood supermarkets in Germany. and the Hotel Tritone in Trieste, which inspired the Le Mat social franchise, now active in Italy and Sweden.

Social franchising also refers to a technique used by governments and aid donors to provide essential clinical health services in the developing world.

Social Franchise Enterprises objective is to achieve development goals by creating self sustainable activities by providing services and goods in un-served areas. They use the Franchise Model characteristics to deliver Capacity Building, Access to Market and Access to Credit/Finance.

== Third-party logistics franchising ==
Third-party logistics has become an increasingly more popular franchise opportunity due to the quickly growing transportation industry and low cost franchising. In 2012, Inc. Magazine ranked three logistics and transportation companies in the top 100 fastest growing companies in the annual Inc. 5000 rankings.

== Event franchising ==
Event franchising is the replication of public events in other geographical areas while retaining the original brand, including its logo, mission, concept and format. As in classic franchising, the model depends on reproducing an event format that has already been established elsewhere. One example is the World Economic Forum, also known as the Davos forum, which has developed regional meetings in places such as China and Latin America. The alter-globalist World Social Forum has likewise been followed by a number of national and regional events. In the United Kingdom, When The Music Stops has operated as an events franchise focused on speed dating and singles events.

== Home-based franchises ==
The franchising or duplication of another firm's successful home-based business model is referred to as a home-based franchise. Home-based franchises are becoming popular as they are considered to be an easy way to start a business as they may provide a low barrier for entry into entrepreneurship. It may cost little to start a home-based franchise, but experts say that "the work is no less hard."

== See also ==
- American Association of Franchisees and Dealers
- Franchise termination
- Franchise agreement
- Franchise consulting
- Franchise Disclosure Document
- Franchise fraud
- List of franchises
- The Franchise Rule
- U.S. Securities and Exchange Commission
- Martha Matilda Harper, another female franchising pioneer
- Leslie Joseph Hooker, Australian pioneer of franchising of LJ Hooker real estate
