= Legal threat =

Statement by a party that it intends to take legal intention on another party

A legal threat is a statement by a party that it intends to take legal action on another party, generally accompanied by a demand that the other party take an action demanded by the first party or refrain from taking or continuing actions objected to by the demanding party.

== Nature ==
Legal threats take many forms. Common to all is that the party making the threat will take some form of action of a legal nature. Most common is the threatened initiation of a lawsuit against the second party. Other threats might include an administrative law action or complaint, referring the other party to a regulatory body, turning the party into the legal authorities over a crime or civil infraction, or the like. Legal threats are often veiled or indirect, e.g. a threat that a party "shall be forced to consider its legal options" or "will refer the matter to legal counsel."

== Types ==
=== Cease and desist ===
A cease and desist (C&D) letter is a formalized legal demand that a party stop ("cease") and refrain ("desist") from an activity that the demanding party finds objectionable, generally couched in formal language accusing the activity of violating the law.

The objected-to activity may be most anything, although cease-and-desist letters are particularly common among certain areas of the law:

- alleged intellectual property infringement (e.g. patent infringement, trademark infringement, copyright infringement, etc.)
- alleged defamation such as libel and slander
- harassment, nuisance, and other torts
- violation of certain agreements to not engage in certain commercial conduct (e.g. with respect to competition, territories, etc.)
- where a personal financial and legal administrator (e.g. as commonly appointed in Australia) acting under an Order of a court for a represented person (e.g. a person with an alleged disability) for a specified time, as specified in the Order, continues the administration beyond the anniversary date (end date) of the Order, against the represented person's wishes.

=== Demand letter ===
A demand letter is a formalized demand by a party that another party pay money or take certain acts, often accompanied by a claim that the second party has engaged in illegal conduct, with an implicit or explicit threat that the demanding party will take some form of legal action.

== Effect ==
For the most part, a legal threat is of no legal significance other than a matter of negotiation tactics; however, in certain instances, a legal threat does have some legal significance. Among other things, a legal threat may do the following:

- Establish notice - the party receiving the threat, and the party making the threat, are "on notice" of the circumstances and cannot later claim they were unaware.
- Constitute extortion, blackmail, or some other crime or tort involving improper threats of harm: for example, it is considered unethical, and in some cases a crime, to threaten to report criminal conduct to the police unless a settlement is reached.
- In some circumstances, a claim (veiled or not) that a party will take action based on alleged violation of the law gives rise to a right by the receiving party to bring an action for declaratory judgment that it has not broken the law: for example, if the holder of a trademark claims that a party is infringing a trademark, that party may bring suit asking a court to declare that there is in fact no infringement.

In addition to their legal significance, legal threats may create a number of practical results:

- Intimidating a party into acquiescing to the demand, whether there is a legal basis for it, out of fear of litigation expense, negative publicity, loss of entitlement (e.g. losing a business license), or other negative consequence
- Alerting a party to illegal conduct it was unaware of, or that it did not realize was illegal or objectionable
- Delaying or disrupting lawful and legitimate activity, as the victim of the threats, must devote time to obtaining expensive legal counsel.
- Risking public disclosure of the threat, thereby portraying the party making the threat in a bad light (see the Streisand effect). Threats of frivolous litigation against major news organisations are extraordinarily risky in this regard, as the newspaper will most often report the threat in the paper itself.

== See also ==
- Abuse of process
- Barratry (common law)
- Franchise fraud
- Frivolous litigation
- In terrorem
- Malicious prosecution
- Strategic lawsuit against public participation
- Vexatious litigation
