= Franchise rule =

Law of the United States

The franchise rule defines acts or practices that are unfair or deceptive in the franchise industry in the United States. The franchise rule was published by the Federal Trade Commission. The franchise rule seeks to facilitate informed decisions and to prevent deception in the sale of franchises by requiring franchisors to provide prospective franchisees with essential information prior to the sale. It does not, however, regulate the substance of the terms that control the relationship between franchisors and franchisees. Also, while the franchise rule removed the regulation of the sale of franchises from the purview of state law, placing it under the authority of the FTC to regulate interstate commerce, the FTC franchise rule does not require franchisors to disclose the unit performance statistics of the franchised system to new buyers of franchises (as would be necessary under state and federal securities and exchange law). The FTC franchise rule was originally adopted in 1978. This followed a lengthy FTC rulemaking proceeding that began in 1971. A substantial revision of the FTC franchise rule was adopted by the FTC in 2007.

== Franchise law ==
In the United States, the Federal Trade Commission has oversight of franchising, rather than the US Securities and Exchange Commission.

The FTC administrates oversight via the FTC franchise rule. The FTC announced an update to the franchise Rule on January 23, 2007, becoming effective July 1, 2007.

The most recent version of the FTC franchise rule was in 2007, is printed in FR 2007a, pp. 15544–15575.

After July 2008, all franchisors in the United States are to use the Franchise Disclosure Document with potential franchisees.

== Franchise law background ==
The Federal Trade Commission began examining practices in franchising in 1970. In 1971 the FTC began a formal rule making proceeding, to possibly develop a regulation requiring disclosure and prohibiting unfair practices in offering and selling franchises. These developments resulted in promulgation of the FTC Franchise Rule in 1979. The FTC enforces the Federal Trade Commission Act (FTC Act), which prohibits unfair methods of competition and unfair or deceptive acts or practices in or affecting commerce.

The FTC Act also empowers the commission to prescribe rules that define with specificity acts or practices that are unfair or deceptive. One such rule is the commission's franchise rule.

In 2006 the franchise rule was amended, with voluntary adoption of the changes permitted as of July 1, 2007 and mandatory adoption and compliance required as of July 1, 2008

The commission focuses much of its franchise rule enforcement and consumer educational resources on combating business opportunity fraud.

The franchise rule requires franchisors to make material disclosures in five categories:

- the nature of the franchisor and the franchise system
- the franchisor's financial viability
- the costs involved in purchasing and operating a franchised outlet
- the terms and conditions that govern the franchise relationship
- the names and addresses of current franchisees who can share their experiences within the franchise system, thus helping the prospective franchisee to verify independently the franchisor's claims

In addition, franchisors must have a reasonable basis and substantiation for any financial performance representations (FPRs) made to prospective franchisees, as well as disclose the basis and assumptions underlying any such FPRs in Item 19 of the FDD. Though FPRs are not required to be provided to prospective franchisees under the FTC rule, the majority of franchisors do provide some level of FPR disclosure.

The franchise rule generally covers two different types of business arrangements: franchises and business opportunity ventures.

== Franchise agreements ==
Franchise agreements typically involve retail outlets that bear the franchisor's trademark and follow the franchisor's business operations model, such as fast-food restaurants, hotels, and automotive repair shops. These are commonly known as "business-format" franchises.

== Non-franchise business opportunities ==
Some business opportunities operate similar to franchises, and may even purport to be franchises, but often without the robust support model expected in franchising. Though business opportunities are not by definition fraudulent, they may be more likely to result in consumer fraud. In 2012 the Federal Trade Commission enacted legislation specifically to address the issue of fraudulent non-franchised business opportunities.

== Franchise disclosure document laws ==
In addition to the FTC, fifteen states require pre-sale disclosure in franchise sales. Prior to the adoption of the amended rule, disclosure was required in the form of a uniform franchise offering circular, which was renamed to a franchise disclosure document (FDD) when the amended rule was adopted. The FDD format is generally accepted by states that have franchise-specific disclosure requirements, though they may require certain changes specific to the state's law attached as an addendum.

== Franchise rule enforcement ==
The franchise rule has the force and effect of law, and it may be enforced through civil penalty actions in federal courts.(10) The FTC Act authorizes courts to impose civil penalties of not more than $11,000 per compliance violation.

== Franchise disclosure document ==
The franchise rule requires franchisors to provide all potential franchisees with a disclosure document containing 23 specific items of information about the offered franchise, its officers, and other franchisees.

Required franchise disclosure document topics include: the franchise's litigation history, past and current franchisees and their contact information, any exclusive territory that comes with the franchise, assistance the franchisor provides franchisees, and the cost of purchasing and starting up a franchise. If a franchisor makes representations about the financial performance of the franchise, this topic also must be covered, as well as the material basis backing up those representations.

== Franchise termination ==
Franchise termination is covered in the franchise agreement between the franchiser and franchisee. In the 2007 franchise rule, comments from former franchisees were listed concerning confidentiality agreements and franchise fraud.
