= Franchise fraud =

Form of pyramid scam based on franchising

Franchise fraud is defined by the United States Federal Bureau of Investigation as a pyramid scheme.

== Franchise fraud in U.S. federal law ==
The FBI website states:

"pyramid schemes — also referred to as franchise fraud or chain referral schemes — are marketing and investment frauds in which an individual is offered a distributorship or franchise to market a particular product. The real profit is earned, not by the sale of the product, but by the sale of new distributorships. Emphasis on selling franchises rather than the product eventually leads to a point where the supply of potential investors is exhausted and the pyramid collapses."

In the United States, franchising is regulated by a complex web of franchise rules and franchising regulations consisting of the Federal Trade Commission Franchise Rule, state laws, and industry guidelines.

The most recent version of the FTC Franchise Rule was in 2007, is printed in FR 2007a, pp. 15544–15575.

The FTC franchise rule specifies what information a franchisor must disclose to a prospective franchise business as a franchise opportunity in a document named the Franchise Disclosure Document (FDD).

=== Ponzi schemes ===
Similar to a pyramid scheme, a Ponzi scheme involves paying existing investors in a nonexistent enterprise with the funds from new investors thus creating the illusion of a "profit". One of the key differences between a Ponzi scheme and a pyramid scheme is that in a Ponzi scheme, investors are paid using the money from future investors. While in a pyramid scheme, the original schemer recruits other investors to recruit others (and so on) where new recruits pay the person who recruited them for the right to participate or perhaps sell a certain product.

=== Means of committing franchise fraud ===
Franchisors that practice franchise fraud will attempt to pressure a franchisee leaving the franchise system to sign a non-disclosure agreement, confidentiality agreement or a gag order. The gag order allows franchise misrepresentation by preventing prospective new franchisees learning important details about the churning franchise. Unfortunately, the Federal Trade Commission Rule and the State Franchise Disclosure Documents that govern the sale of franchises appear to enable franchisors to withhold negative facts concerning the performance of the franchised business plan from new buyers of franchises and to disclaim that the franchisors have promised anything in the way of success and profits in the written disclosure document and the binding, and generally non-negotiated, franchise agreement. The sellers of franchised business plans, the franchisors, themselves, appear to have no obligation under current rules and regulations to disclose negative system UNIT performance statistics to new buyers of the franchised business plans who then unknowingly purchase franchises that have demonstrated low or no profitability and high failure rates of "founding" franchisees.

Under the FTC Rule and State Franchise Disclosure Documents, franchisors do not seem to be obligated to share system UNIT Performance Statistics with new buyers. Consequently, individuals interested in purchasing a franchise should diligently engage with both current and former franchisees to gain insights into the performance and operations of the franchise system. It is also important to recognize that, legally, current and ex-franchisees are not required to provide details about their businesses to potential franchisees.

In the 2007 Franchise Rule, in the Federal Register from pages 15505 to 15506, comments from former franchisees were listed concerning confidentiality agreements:

- "commenters complained that the use of confidentiality clauses is widespread, and several commenters urged the Commission to ban the use of confidentiality clauses as a deceptive or unfair trade practice. Other opponents of confidentiality clauses—including state regulators and some franchisors—asserted that such provisions inhibit prospective franchisees from learning the truth as they conduct their due diligence investigation of a franchise offer."
- "one franchisee representative, contended that the harm flowing from confidentiality provisions goes beyond individual franchise sales, noting that such provisions intimidate franchisees into not testifying before legislative committees and public agencies, such as the Federal Trade Commission."
- "[T]he gag order . . . prohibits me from being able to answer questions, you know, and give cautionary remarks to other people who might be considering the franchise that I was with."
- "‘‘the use of gag orders is almost 100 percent in some franchise systems."
- "Three franchisees— Raymond Buckley, Roger C. Haines, and David E. Myklebust—believed that they were kept in the dark about the failure of their franchisor’s system due to confidentiality clauses imposed on current and former franchisees."
- "confidentiality clauses "typically release the franchisor from legal liability and bar the franchisee (under threat of legal action) from making any oral or written statements about the franchise system or their experience with the franchised business. The purpose of such clauses is to shut down any negative public comment about the franchise system."
- "franchisee, related: "I had spoken to some of the franchisees that had left the system. I now feel certain that they painted a picture that was not close to being the truth based on the gag order that [the franchisor] imposed. Had I gotten the truth from these people, my decision certainly would have been different. Every franchisee leaving the system has had a gag order placed on them, making it impossible for current and future franchisees to get the facts."

By having former franchisees under a gag order, franchisors that practice business franchise fraud or franchise churning "inhibit prospective franchisees from learning the truth about the franchising opportunity as they conduct their due diligence investigation of a franchise offer."

== Franchise fraud law in the U.S. state by state ==
=== California ===
California Franchise Investment Law, begins at section 31000 of the California Corporations Code. Part 1 lists the definitions of the California Franchise code. Part 2 is the Regulation Of The Sale Of Franchises. There are three chapters, 1) Exemptions, 2) Disclosures, and 3) General Provisions.

Under chapter 2, section 31125 the following exists

(A) The proposed modification is in connection with the resolution of a bona fide dispute between the franchisor and the franchisee or the resolution of a claimed or actual franchisee or franchisor default, and the modification is not applied on a franchise systemwide basis at or about the time the modification is executed. A modification shall not be deemed to be made on a franchise systemwide basis if it is offered on a voluntary basis to fewer than 25 percent of the franchisor's California franchises within any 12-month period.

(B) The proposed modification is offered on a voluntary basis to fewer than 25 percent of the franchisor's California franchises within any 12-month period, provided each franchisee is given a right to rescind the modification agreement if the modification is not made in compliance with paragraph (1) of subdivision (c).

(d) Any modification of a franchise agreement with an existing franchise of a franchisee shall be exempted from this chapter if the modification is offered on a voluntary basis and does not substantially and adversely impact the franchisee's rights, benefits, privileges, duties, obligations, or responsibilities under the franchise agreement.

(f) A franchisor shall not make modifications in consecutive years for the purpose of evading the 25 percent requirements set forth above.

If a franchisor in California keeps less than 25% of former California franchisees (not nationwide franchisees), per year, under a Gag order, there is no violation. The modification agreement can have a clause in the document stating that it was "signed voluntarily".

Part 3 of this code describes Fraudulent and Prohibited Practices. Chapter 1 describes Fraudulent practices. Chapter 2 describes Prohibited practices. Chapter 3 describes Unfair practices.

=== Indiana ===
In Indiana, fraud, deceit, and misrepresentation during the process of franchise contract formation or performance is actionable at civil law under the Indiana Franchise Act. There is no general right of action, only a specific right of private action by a party on the aforementioned grounds. The scope of franchise fraud is also narrower than the scope of ordinary common law fraud action. The Indiana Supreme Court holds that "the circumstances of fraud would be the time, the place, the substance of the false representations, the facts mispresented, and the identification of what was procured by the fraud....the plaintiff in a franchise fraud action must nevertheless plead the facts and circumstances alleged to constitute fraud, deceit, or misrepresentation with at least the same degree of particularity and detail as would be necessary to maintain an action for common law fraud".

Also held by the Supreme Court is that scienter is not an element of franchise fraud. Nor does failure to disclose on the part of a franchisor a pending civil lawsuit at the time of making a franchise agreement constitute franchise fraud, so long as any such representations as to legal action are not relied upon by either party as part of their decision-making process. Statements by the franchisor as to potential earnings by the franchisee do not constitute franchise fraud, since they do not constitute a material (mis-)representation of past or existing facts.

Civil action under the Franchise Disclosure Act must be brought within three years of discovery of the violation. Action brought under the Deceptive Franchise Practices Act must be brought within two.

=== Texas ===
The Texas Supreme Court follows similar standards to the U.S. Supreme Court for evaluating forum selection clauses. Generally, Texas courts uphold voluntary forum selection clauses unless they are affected by fraud, overreach, or are considered unreasonable and unjust. It is challenging to contest these clauses on public policy grounds in a Texas court. Regardless of legal liability theories, Texas courts are required to honor forum selection clauses.

=== Virginia ===
In Virginia, it is unlawful for any person to sell or offer to sell a franchise in commonwealth unless the franchise is registered under the Retail Franchising Act. Virginia state law requires that you prove intent in fraud cases.

The Section of the Retail franchising act that deals with fraud is § 13.1-569. Under § 13.1-569, it reads:

A. Any person who shall knowingly and willfully make, or cause to be made, any false statement in any book of account or other paper of any person subject to the provisions of this chapter, or knowingly and willfully exhibit any false paper to the Commission, or who shall knowingly and willfully commit any act declared unlawful by this chapter with the intent to defraud any franchisee or with intent to deceive the Commission as to any material fact for the purpose of inducing the Commission to take any action or refrain from taking any action pursuant to this chapter, shall be guilty of a Class 4 felony.

B. Any person who shall knowingly make or cause to be made any false statement in any book of account or other paper of any person subject to the provisions of this chapter or exhibit any false paper to the Commission or who shall commit any act declared unlawful by this chapter shall be guilty of a misdemeanor, and on conviction, be punished by a fine of not less than $100 nor more than $5,000, or by confinement in jail for not less than thirty days nor more than one year, or by both such fine and imprisonment.

C. Prosecutions under this section shall be instituted by indictments in the courts of record having jurisdiction of felonies within three years from the date of the offense.

== See also ==
- American Association of Franchisees and Dealers
- Franchise termination
- Censorship
- Chilling effect (law)
- Fear mongering
- Franchise Disclosure Document
- Franchising
- Rollovers as Business Start-Ups
- The Franchise Rule
- Frivolous litigation
- Legal threat
- SLAPP
- U.S. Securities and Exchange Commission
